= Irish National Cycling Championships =

Annual cycling races

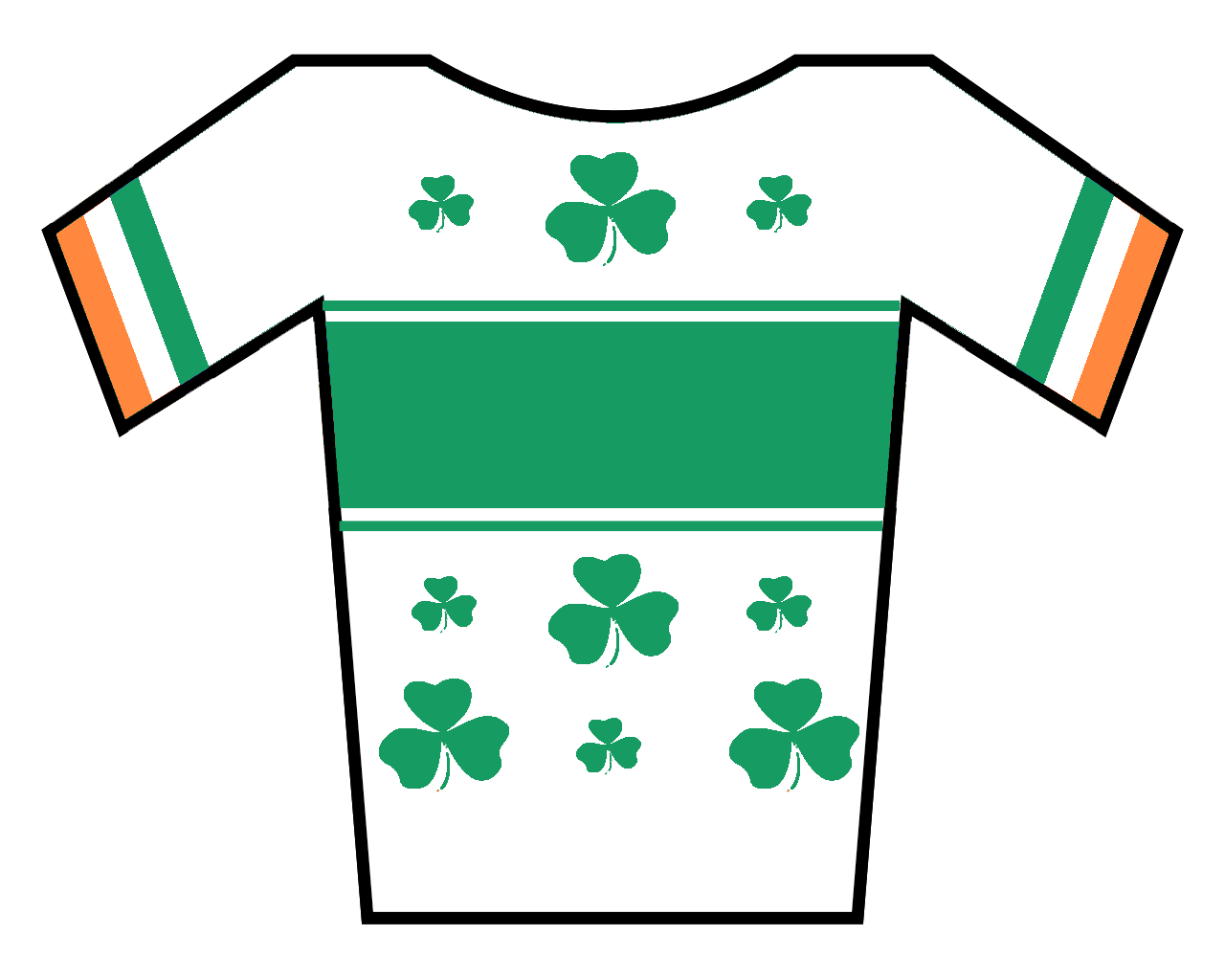

Race details
- Date: June
- Region: Ireland
- Discipline: Road & Track
- Type: Road Race, Time Trial, Criterium, Cyclo-Cross, Track

History
- First edition: 1875
- Editions: 140 (as of 2015)
- First winner: Men: A.C. Rodgers; Women: Margaret Radburn
- Most wins: M. RR: Matt Brammeier; Shay O'Hanlon (4); M. TT: Paddy Flanagan (7 +4); W. RR: Geraldine Gill, Siobhan Horgan (5 each); W. TT: Olivia Dillon (4)
- Most recent: M. RR:Rory Townsend; M. TT:Ben Healy; M. Cr: Dillon Corkery; W. RR: Lydia Boylan; W. TT: Eileen Burns

The Irish National Cycling Championships are annual cycling races to decide the Irish cycling champion for several disciplines, across several categories of rider.

The men's road championship is usually held on a Sunday at the end of June; the women's race is held the previous day. The winning élite rider wears the national champion's jersey for all road races in the following 12 months. Unlike most countries, the jersey does not contain the national flag or stripes from the flag's colours; instead, the jersey has a wide green band superimposed with a shamrock, the national flower of Ireland. The men's under-23 champion is awarded to the first under-23 in the élite race. The junior road races are held on the same day as the élite and the time-trial championship is held earlier in the week. The national criteriums are held later in the summer.

== Medals ==
=== National Championships ===
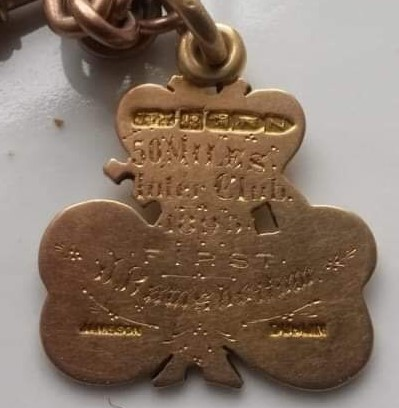
Championship medal 1885–1923

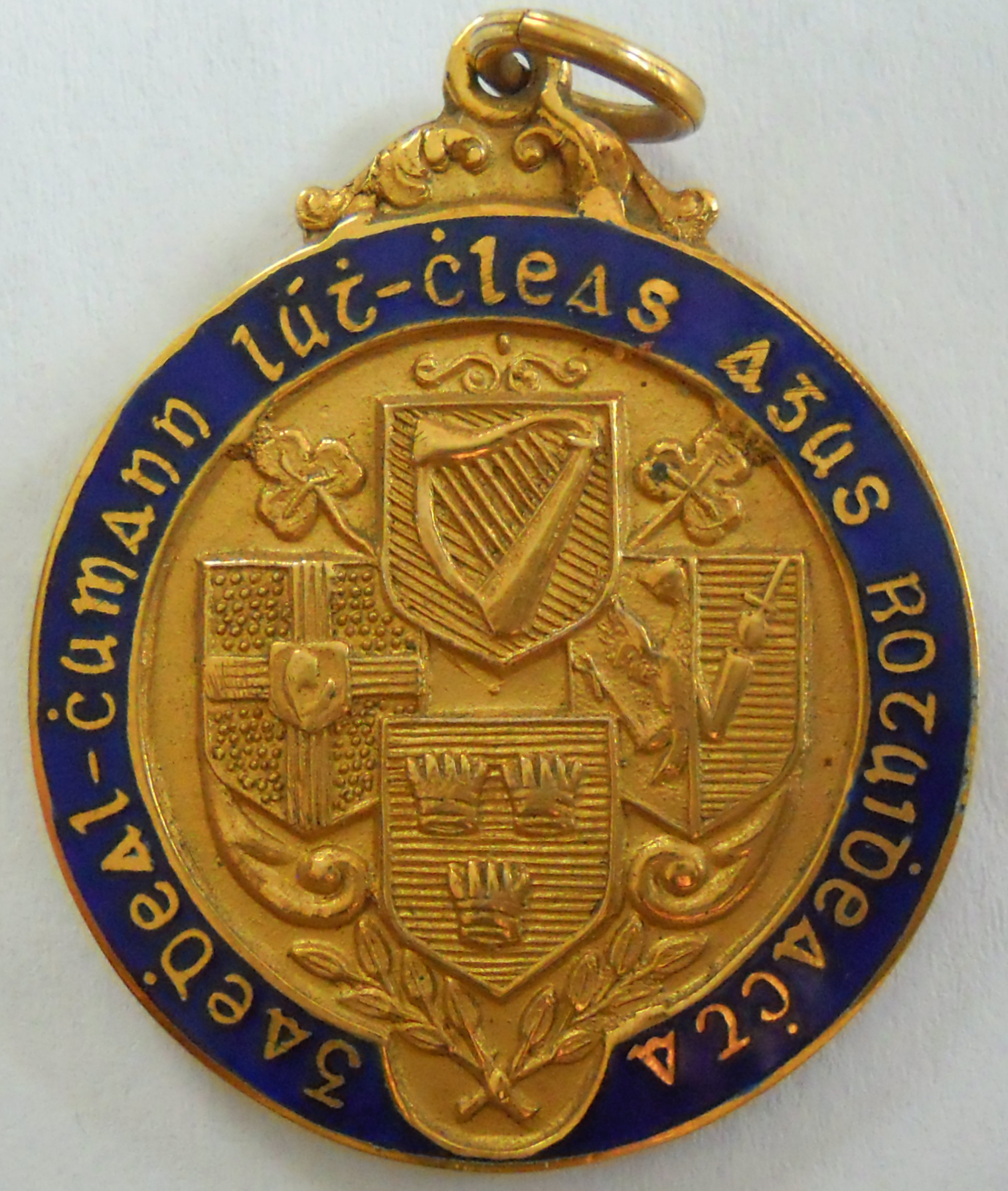
NACA/NCA medal 1923 to 1979

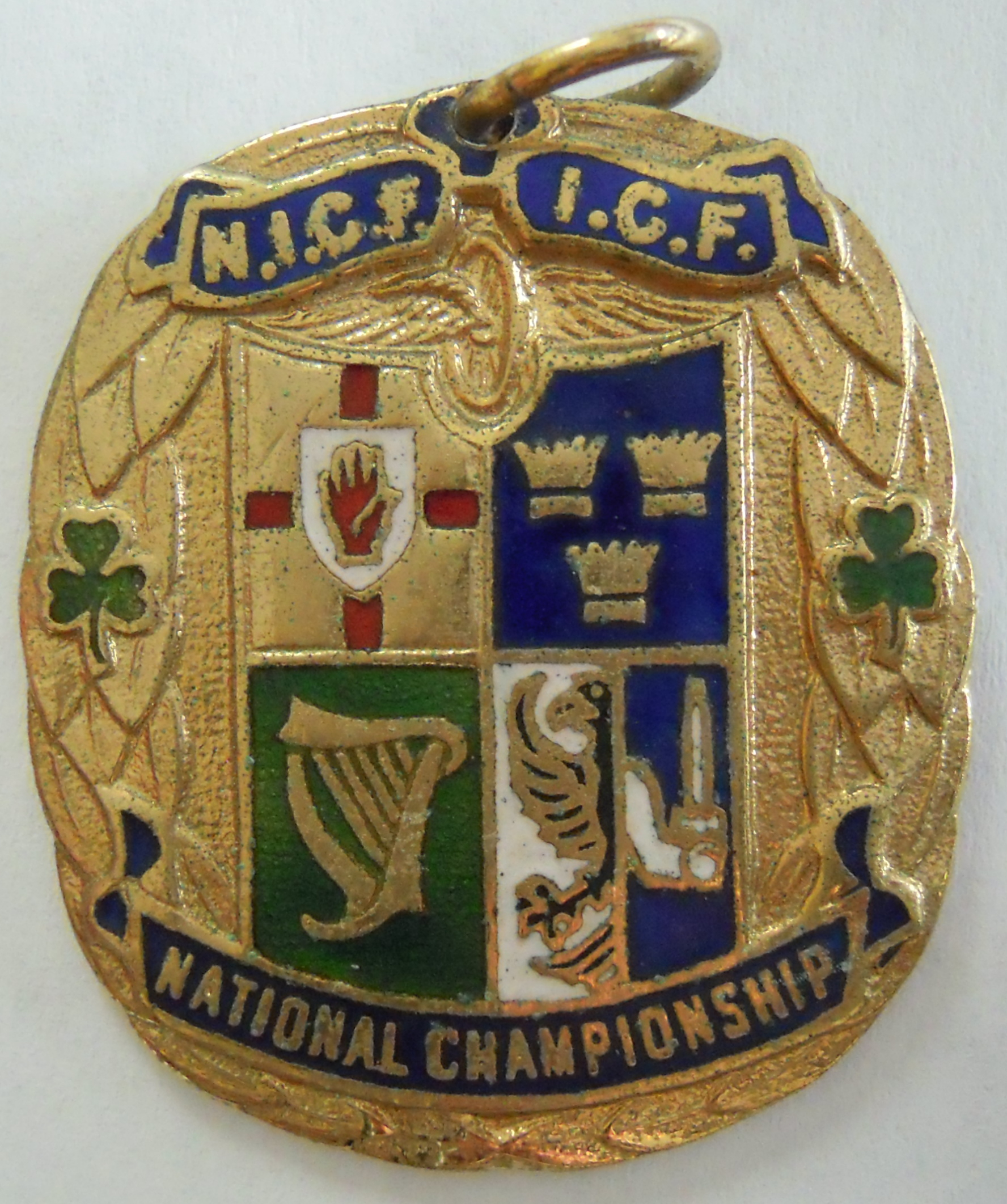
ICF/NICF medal 1967 to 1979

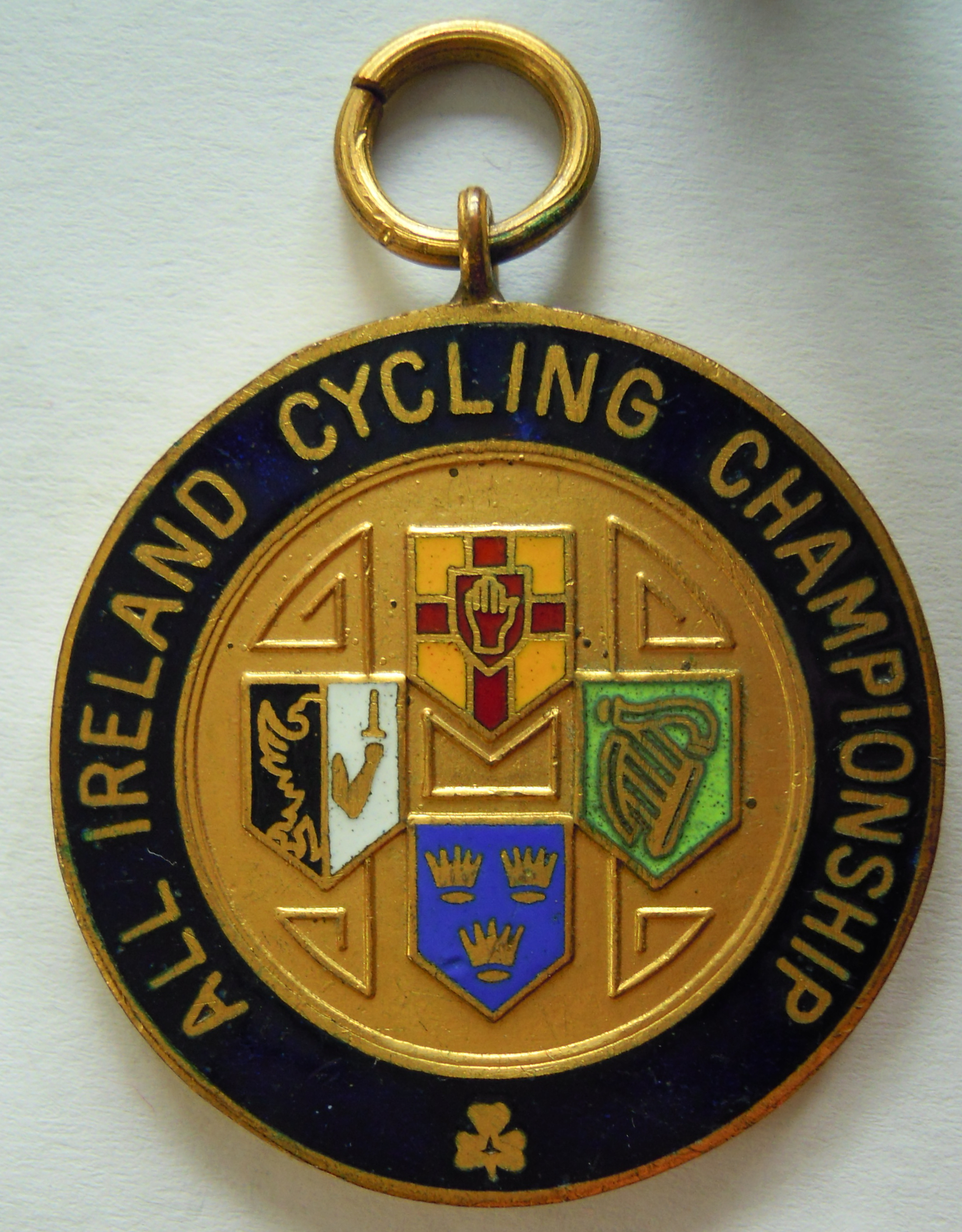
Irish Cycling Tripartite Committee medal 1979 onwards

=== Other medals ===
Courtesy Quay Cycles, Drogheda

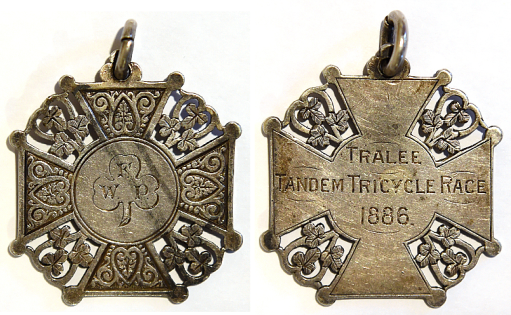
1886 medal, Tralee

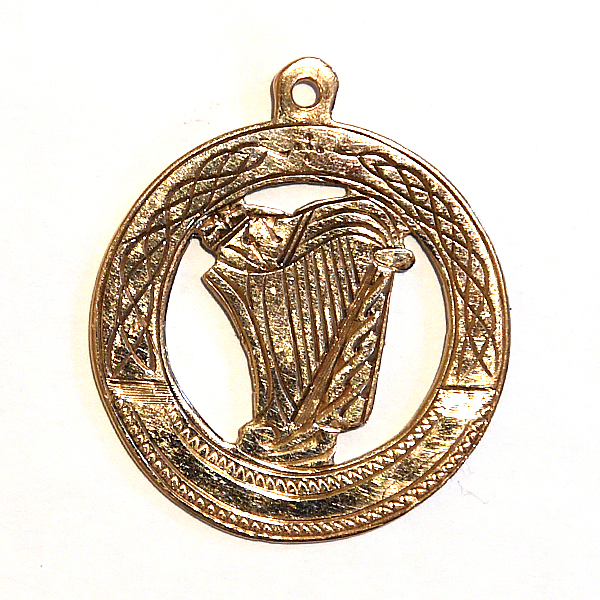
Leinster Championship 1939, Herbie Breadon

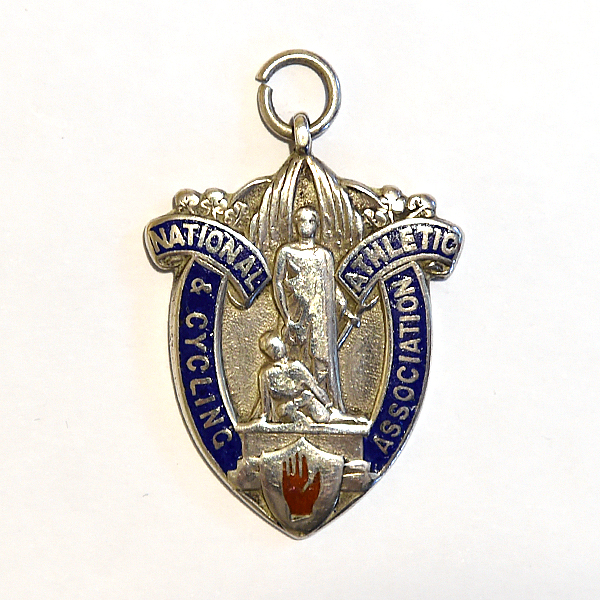
Ulster Championship, NACA. 1939 Montgomery (junior)

== Road Race ==
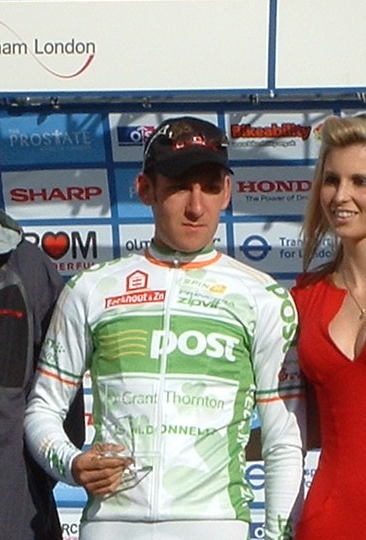
Matt Brammeier

=== Amateur Senior Men ===
| Year | 50 km | 100 km | 50ml/80 km | 100ml/160 km |
| 1877 | | | A. Spring | |
| 1878 | | | H. H. Law | |
| 1879 | | | T. W. Knox | |
| 1880 | | | A. M. Toomey | |
| 1881 | | | R. Hassard | |
| 1882 | | | W. M. Woodside | |
| 1883 | | | T. J. Levis | |
| 1884 | | | E. S. McKay | |
| 1885 | | | A. McCormack | |
| 1886 | | | A. McCormack | |
| 1887 | | | J. McCormack | |
| 1888 | | | H. Russell | |
| 1889 | | | J. P. Butler | |
| 1890 | | | B. W. Pigott | |
| 1891 | | | S. McAdam | |
| 1895 | | | Harry Reynolds | |
| 1896 | | | John Ramsbottom | |
| 1897 | | | J. J. Carragher | |
| 1898 | | | Jack Meade | |
| 1913 | | | Michael Walker | |
| 1938 | | | J. Bell | |
| 1939 | Bertie Donnely (NCA) | W. J. Broughal (CRE) | C. Gilmore | |
| 1940 | George Robinson | | | |
| 1941 | George Robinson | T. Hughes | | |
| 1942 | Frank Baird | | | |
| 1943 | Tommy Quinn | Frank Baird | | |
| 1944 | J. McCann | S. O'Gorman | | |
| 1945 | Ollie Kelly | Ando Christle | | |
| 1946 | Paddy Lennon | Matt Marlow | | |
| 1947 | Frank Baird | Paddy Marlow | Tommy Walsh | J. Shortall |
| 1948 | | | Paddy Marlow | Matt Marlow |
| 1949 | | | Frank Baird | Frank Baird |
| 1950 | | | E. Hawkins | Karl McCarthy(NCA); Jim McQuaid (CRE/NICF) |
| 1951 | | | Karl McCarthy | Joe McCormack (NCA); Jim McQuaid (CRE/NICF) |
| 1952 | | | M. Nolan | Colm Christle (NCA); Joe McCormack (CRE/NICF) |
| 1953 | | | John Lackey | Colm Christle (NCA); Shay Elliott (NICF/CRE) |
| 1954 | | | Denis O'Connor | Willie O'Brien (NCA), Shay Elliott (CRE/NICF) |
| 1955 | | | Mick Cahill | Gerry Keogh (NCA), Bart Sharkey (CRE/NICF) |
| 1956 | | | Jimmy Nolan | Gene Mangan (NCA); Des Courtney (CRE/NICF) |
| 1957 | | | Gerry Keogh | Christy Dunne ( NCA); John Lackey (CRE/NICF) |
| 1958 | | | Cathal O'Reilly | Cathal O'Reilly ( NCA); Peter Dowling (CRE/NICF) |
| 1959 | | | Tom Beamish | Jim Maguire (CRE/NICF); Mick Slattery (NCA) |
| 1960 | | | Shay O'Hanlon | Peter Crinnion (CRE/NICF); Murt Logan (NCA) |
| 1961 | | | Mick Christle | Shay O'Hanlon (NCA), Jimmy Kennedy (CRE/NICF) |
| 1962 | | | | Shay O'Hanlon (NCA), Christy Kimmage (CRE/NICF) |
| 1963 | | | | Morris Foster (CRE/NICF); Sonny Cullen (NCA) |
| 1964 | | | | Gordon Caldwell (CRE/NICF); Shay O'Hanlon (NCA) |
| 1965 | | | | Noel O'Neill (CRE/NICF), Mick Christle & Paddy Flanagan (tie, NCA) |
| 1966 | | | | Steve Chivers (CRE/NICF); Bobby Shaw (NCA) |
| 1967 | | | | Noel Taggart (CRE/NICF) |
| 1968 | | | | Peter Doyle (ICF/NICF); Paddy Flanagan (NCA) |
| 1969 | | | | Phil O'Brien (ICF/NICF); Seamus Kennedy (NCA) |
| 1970 | | | | Paul Elliott (ICF/NICF), Larry Clarke (NCA) |
| 1971 | | | | Liam Horner (ICF/NICF), Jim McConville (NCA) |
| 1972 | | | | Noel Taggart (ICF/NICF), Colm Nulty (NCA) |
| 1973 | | | | John McCarthy (CRE/NICF); Mick Cahill (NCA) |
| 1974 | | | | Pat McQuaid (ICF/NICF); Colm Nulty (NCA) |
| 1975 | | | | Shay O'Hanlon (NCA) Martin McQuillan (ICF/NICF) |
| 1976 | | | | Alan McCormack (ICF/NICF); Colm Nulty (NCA) |
| 1977 | | | | Tony Lally (ICF/NICF); Ned Flanagan (NCA) |
| 1978 | | | | Tony Lally (ICF/NICF); |
| YEAR | VENUE | 1st | 2nd | 3rd |
| 1979 | Navan | Pat Healy | Peter Morton | Seán Lally |
| 1980 | Lurgan | Michael Nulty | Stephen Roche | Sean Lally |
| 1981 | Waterford | Paul Kimmage | Brendan Madden | Mick Nulty |
| 1982 | Castlebar | Billy Kerr | Lennie Kirk | David Gardiner |
| 1983 | Bangor | John McQuaid | Tony Lally/Paul Kimmage tied | - |
| 1984 | Carrick On Suir | Paul Kimmage | Eddie Madden | Tony Murphy |
| 1985 | Bray | John McQuaid | Bernie McCormack | Joe Barr |
| 1986 | Bangor | Alastair Irvine | Bobby Power | Shane Clark |
| 1987 | Eniskillen | Philip Cassidy | Ger Madden | Richard O'Gorman |
| 1988 | Midleton | Anthony O'Gorman | Chris McCann | Mick Kinsella |
| 1989 | Roundwood | Paul Slane | Mick Walsh | Anthony O'Gorman |
| 1990 | Waterford | Julian Dalby | John Sheehan | Conor Henry |
| 1991 | Baltinglass | Paul Slane | Gerard Madden | Kevin Kimmage |
| 1992 | Camlough | Ian Chivers | Stephen Maher | David Hourigan |
| 1993 | Castleisland | Robert Power | Stephen Maher | Conor Henry |
| 1994 | Newry | Mark Kane | Conor Henry | Patrick Callaly |
| 1995 | Wexford | Michael Fitzgerald | Stephen Maher | Tommy Evans |
| 1996 | Portglenone | Peter Daly | Bill Moore | Aidan Duff |

=== Elite/Senior Men ===
| Year | Location | Gold | Silver | Bronze |
| 1997 | Carrick On Suir | Morgan Fox | David McCann | Raymond Clarke |
| 1998 | Collon | Raymond Clarke | David McCann | Ian Chivers |
| 1999 | Waterford City | Tommy Evans | Morgan Fox | Eugene Moriarty |
| 2000 | Blackpool, Cork | David McCann | Brian Kenneally | Mark Scanlon |
| 2001 | Dundrod, Belfast | David McCann (2) | Mark Scanlon | Paddy Moriarty |
| 2002 | Stamullen | Mark Scanlon | Ciarán Power | Tommy Evans |
| 2003 | Sligo | Mark Scanlon (2) | Denis Lynch | David O'Loughlin |
| 2004 | Sligo | David O'Loughlin | David McCann | Nicolas Roche |
| 2005 | Belfast | David O'Loughlin (2) | Mark Scanlon | David McCann |
| 2006 | Westport | David McCann (3) | Ciarán Power | Paídi O'Brien |
| 2007 | Waterford | David O'Loughlin (3) | Paídi O'Brien | Mark Cassidy |
| 2008 | Midleton | Dan Martin | Paídi O'Brien | Brian Kenneally |
| 2009 | Dunboyne | Nicolas Roche | David O'Loughlin | Paídi O'Brien |
| 2010 | Sligo | Matt Brammeier | Nicolas Roche | Dan Martin |
| 2011 | Emyvale | Matt Brammeier (2) | Dan Martin | David McCann |
| 2012 | Clonmel | Matt Brammeier (3) | Nicolas Roche | Philip Lavery |
| 2013 | Carlingford | Matt Brammeier (4) | Philip Lavery | Damien Shaw |
| 2014 | Multyfarnham | Ryan Mullen | Sean Downey | Paídi O'Brien |
| 2015 | Omagh | Damien Shaw | Eddie Dunbar | Conor Dunne |
| 2016 | Kilcullen | Nicolas Roche (2) | Matt Brammeier | Michael O'Loughlin |
| 2017 | Wexford | Ryan Mullen (2) | Chris McGlinchey | Conor Dunne |
| 2018 | Coolaney | Conor Dunne | Darnell Moore | Mark Downey |
| 2019 | Derry | Sam Bennett | Eddie Dunbar | Ryan Mullen |
| 2020 | Knockaderry | Ben Healy | Nicolas Roche | Darragh O'Mahony |
| 2021 | Wicklow | Ryan Mullen (3) | Daire Feeley | Conn McDunphy |
| 2022 | Kanturk | Rory Townsend | Cormac McGeough | Ben Healy |
| 2023 | Dungannon | Ben Healy (2) | Rory Townsend | Sam Bennett |
| 2024 | Athea | Darren Rafferty | Dillon Corkery | Rory Townsend |
| 2025 | Yellow Furze | Rory Townsend (2) | Jamie Meehan | Patrick Casey |

=== Professional men ===
| Year | Location | Gold | Silver | Bronze |
| 1994 | Isle of Man | Martin Earley | Sean Kelly | Joe Barr |

=== Amateur Women ===
| Year | Location | Gold | Silver | Bronze |
| 1990 | Baltinglass | Marie Eribo | D. White | P. Anderson |
| 1991 | | Susan O'Mara | | |
| 1992 | Cork | Marie Eribo | Claire Moore | Helena Kinsella |
| 1993 | | Susan O'Mara | Helena Kinsella | Claire Moore |
| 1994 | | Helena Kinsella | Susan O'Mara | Rachel O'Hara |
| 1995 | Wexford | Claire Moore | | Deirdre Murphy |
| 1996 | | Geraldine Gill | | |

=== Elite Women ===
| Year | Location | Gold | Silver | Bronze |
| 1997 | Kanturk | Sue McMaster | Marie Reilly | J Heenan |
| 1998 | Collon | Susan O'Mara | Claire Moore | Jane McGoey |
| 1999 | Waterford | Geraldine Gill | Marie Reilly | Susan O'Mara |
| 2000 | Blackpool, Cork | Geraldine Gill (2) | Susan O'Mara | Lorraine Manning |
| 2001 | Lisburn | Geraldine Gill (3) | Susan O'Mara | Debbie Booth |
| 2002 | Stamullen | Geraldine Gill (4) | Lorraine Manning | Louise Moriarty |
| 2003 | Sligo | Geraldine Gill (5) | Colette Swift | Karen Bothwell |
| 2004 | Sligo | Julie O'Hagan | Colette Swift | Roisin Kennedy |
| 2005 | Dundrod | Siobhan Dervan | Trudy Brown | Louise Moriarty |
| 2006 | Westport | Siobhan Dervan (2) | Louise Moriarty | Heather Wilson |
| 2007 | Waterford | Siobhan Dervan (3) | Jenny Fay | Louise Moriarty |
| 2008 | Midleton | Siobhan Dervan (4) | Louise Moriarty | Heather Wilson |
| 2009 | Dunboyne | Heather Wilson | Olivia Dillon | Mary Costello |
| 2010 | Sligo | Olivia Dillon | Siobhan Horgan | Fiona Meade |
| 2011 | Emyvale | Siobhan Horgan (5) | Louise Moriarty | Caroline Ryan |
| 2012 | Clonmel | Melanie Späth | Siobhan Horgan | Olivia Dillon |
| 2013 | Carlingford | Melanie Späth (2) | Siobhan McNamara | Mary Costello |
| 2014 | Multyfarnham | Fiona Meade | Olivia Dillon | Louise Moriarty |
| 2015 | Omagh | Lydia Boylan | Lydia Gurley | Olivia Dillon |
| 2016 | Kilcullen | Lydia Boylan (2) | Eva McCrystal | Fiona Meade |
| 2017 | Johnstown, County Wexford | Lydia Boylan (3) | Lauren Creamer | Ellen McDermott |
| 2018 | Coolaney | Eve McCrystal | Lydia Gurley | Alice Sharpe |
| 2019 | Derry City | Alice Sharpe | Imogen Cotter | Katharine Smyth |
| 2020 | Knockaderry, County Limerick | Lara Gillespie | Eve McCrystal | Ellen McDermott |
| 2021 | Wicklow | Imogen Cotter | Megan Armitage | Linda Kelly |
| 2022 | Kanturk | Alice Sharpe | Mia Griffin | Fiona Mangan |
| 2023 | Dungannon | Lara Gillespie (2) | Caoimhe O'Brien | Megan Armitage |
| 2024 | Athea | Fiona Mangan | Grace Reynolds | Lara Gillespie |
| 2025 | Yellow Furze | Mia Griffin | Caoimhe O'Brien | Marine Lenehan |

=== Women Under 23 (Espoir) ===
| Year | Location | Gold | Silver | Bronze |
| 1997 | | Geraldine Gill | | |
| 2024 | | Caoimh O’Brien | Aoife O'Brien | Maeve Gallagher |
| 2025 | | Emma Jeffers | Aoife O'Brien | Abi Conway |

=== Men Under 23 (Espoir) ===
| Year | Location | Gold | Silver | Bronze |
| 1993 C | Kilkenny | Ashley Clancy | Philip McNamara | Kieran Horan |
| 1995 (3) | Dromore, Co. Down | Martin Cronin | Joe Mooney | John O'Brien |
| 1997 | | Michael McNeena | Micahel Quinn | Simon Coughlan |
| 1998 | | Ciarán Power | John McCarthy | Diarmuid Carew |
| 1999 | Riverstick.Cork | David McQuaid | Stephen Gallagher | Gary McQuaid |
| 2000 | | David O'Loughlin | | |
| 2001 | | Thomas Hogan | Conor Murphy | John Dempsey |
| 2002 | Monaghan | Dermot Nally | Denis Lynch | Conor Murphy |
| 2003 | Dunlavin | Denis Lynch | Paidi O'Brien | Conor Murphy |
| 2004 | Sligo | Nicolas Roche | Philip Deignan | Paidi O'Brien |
| 2005 | Belfast | Paidi O'Brien | Tim Cassidy | Michael Concannon |
| 2006 | Westport | Paidi O'Brien (2) | Dan Martin | Mark Cassidy |
| 2007 | Waterford | Mark Cassidy | Martyn Irvine | Adam Armstrong |
| 2008 | Midleton | Dan Martin | Adam Armstrong | Derek Burke |
| 2009 | Dunboyne | Seán Downey | Ronan McLaughlin | Philip Lavery |
| 2010 | Sligo | Sam Bennett | Dominic Jelfs | Thomas Martin |
| 2011 | Emyvale | Sam Bennett (2) | Philip Lavery | Aaron Buggle |
| 2012 | Clonmel | Philip Lavery | Seán Downey | Jack Wilson |
| 2013 | Carlingford | Jack Wilson | Cormac Clarke | Conor Dunne |
| 2014 | Multyfarnham | Ryan Mullen | Jack Wilson | Conor Dunne |
| 2015 | Omagh | Eddie Dunbar | Daniel Stewart | Sean Hahessy |
| 2016 | Kilcullen | Michael O'Loughlin | Mark Downey | Daire Feeley |
| 2017 | Wexford | Michael O'Loughlin (2) | Angus Fyffe | Ryan Reilly |
| 2018 | Coolaney | Darnell Moore | Mark Downey | Michael O’Loughlin |
| 2019 | Derry City | Darragh O'Mahony | Ben Healy | Marc Heaney |
| 2020 | Knockaderry, Co.Limerick | Ben Healy | Kevin McCambridge | Ben Walsh |
| 2021 | Wicklow | John Buller | Liam Curley | George Peden |
| 2022 | Kanturk | Dean Harvey | Darren Rafferty | Archie Ryan |
| 2023 | Dungannon | Jamie Meehan | Darren Rafferty | Odhran Doogan |
| 2024 | Athea, Co.Limerick | Dean Harvey (2) | Patrick O’Loughlin | Jamie Meehan |
| 2025 | | Jamie Meehan (2) | Patrick Casey | Darren Rafferty |

=== Junior Men ===
| Year | Location | Gold | Silver | Bronze |
| 1939 | | Ollie Kelly | | |
| 1940 | | D.C. Walsh | | |
| 1941 | | Tommy Quinn | | |
| 1942 | | Tommy Quinn | | |
| 1944 | | J. J. Doyle | | |
| 1950 | | Mick Christle | | |
| 1951 | | J. Lennon | | |
| 1952 | | Frank Ward | | |
| 1953 | | S. Sweeney | | |
| 1954 | | F. Healy | | |
| 1955 | | S. Healy | | |
| 1956 | | Mick Creighton | | |
| 1957 | | J. McCarthy | | |
| 1958 | | Frank Thompson | | |
| 1959 | | Jim McLoughlin | | |
| 1963 | | Youths' MS: Johnny Lonergan | | |
| 1967 | | Tom Kelly (NCA); C. McDonald(NCA)Youth MS | | |
| 1968 | | John Mangan (NCA) Youth MS | | |
| 1969 | | R. Adair (ICF/NICF) | | |
| 1970 | | Batty Flynn (NCA); D. Beattie (ICF/NICF) | | |
| 1971 | | K. Daly (ICF/NICF) | | |
| 1972 | | Sean Kelly | Oliver McQuaid | Alan McCormack |
| 1973 | | Sean Kelly | | |
| 1974 | Lurgan | G. Wilson | Mick Cusack | Max Ammann |
| 1975 | Ashbourne | Raymond Boyd | Tom Greene | Jimmy Stagg |
| 1976 | Lurgan | Francis Riordan | Paul Talbot | John McCormack |
| 1977 | Cork | Stephen Roche | Len Kirk | Martin Kelly |
| 1978 | Lurgan | Martin Earley | T Flaherty | T Murphy |
| 1979 | Navan | Gerry Keating | Paul Kimmage | Dermot Gilleran |
| 1980 | Lurgan | Martin Earley | A. Wills | G. Scott |
| 1981 | Waterford | Gary Thompson | Mervyn Talbot | Pat Coll |
| 1983 | Bangor | Linus Murphy | Mark Murphy | John Nolan |
| 1984 | Carrick On Suir | Joe Dilworth | B. Reidy | J. Farrell |
| 1986 | Bangor | Paul Lee | Stephen Healy | Liam Collins |
| 1987 | Enniskillen | Damien Long | Andrew Moss | R. Connolly |
| 1988 | Roundwood | Robert Power | Paul Kennedy | Ian Murphy |
| 1989 | Midleton | Niall McCarthy | | |
| 1990 | Baltinglass | Paul Giles | J. Meredith | Mel Sutcliffe |
| 1991 | Emyvale | Declan McGuinness | Mark Gator | Harold Twomey |
| 1992 | Stamullen | Mark Hutton | Michael Mulcahy | Alan Bingham |
| 1993 | Cork | Ken Tobin | Ruairi Mitchell | Michael O'Reilly |
| 1994 | Waterford | Michael Woods | | |
| 1995 | Wexford | Robert Moore | Bryan Geary | Kirk Sloan |
| 1996 | Portglenone | Paul O'Callaghan | Barry Twohig | Ross Blayney |
| 1997 | Carrick On Suir | Dermot Nally | Emmett Hogan | David McQuaid |
| 1998 | Collon | Mark Scanlon | Dermot Nally | Shane Prendergast |
| 1999 | Waterford | Michael Dennehy | Denis Lynch | B. O'Brien |
| 2000 | | Colm Armstrong | Michael Dennehy | Sean Lacey |
| 2001 | | Niall O'Shea | Cian Power | P. O'Brien |
| 2002 | Monaghan | Paidi O'Brien | Nicolas Roche | Barry Woods |
| 2003 | | Michael Lucey | | |
| 2004 | | Maurice O'Brien | Mark Nestor | Ciaran Kelly |
| 2005 | | Michael Murray | Ronan McLaughlin | Tim O'Regan |
| 2006 | Broadford, County Limerick | Simon Williams | Denis Dunworth | Diarmuid Ó Cróinín |
| 2007 | Waterford | Denis Dunworth | Philip Lavery | Seán Downey |
| 2008 | Midleton | Sam Bennett | Charles Prendergast | Mark Heneghan |
| 2009 | Dunboyne | Charles Prendergast | Marcus Christie | Peter Williams |
| 2010 | Sligo | Jack Wilson | Adam Rayner | Ewan McDonald |
| 2011 | Castlebar | Ryan Mullen | Jason Nulty | Jack Wilson |
| 2012 | Blackrock, County Louth | Liam Corcoran | Matthew Doyle | Cian Dwyer |
| 2013 | Omagh | Fintan Ryan | Stephen Shanahan | Dylan O'Brien |
| 2014 | Blarney | Eddie Dunbar | Michael O'Loughlin | Jamie Blanchfield |
| 2015 | Cong | Michael O'Loughlin | Darragh O'Mahony | Sean Yelverton |
| 2016 | Cong | Jake Gray | Conor McCann | Conor Leech |
| 2017 | Maghera | Ethan Downey | Luke Smith | Adam Ward |
| 2018 | Colooney | Adam Ward | Ben Healy | Aaron Doherty |
| 2019 | Derry City | Tom Moriarty | Archie Ryan | Kevin McCambridge |
| 2020 | Knockaderry, County Limerick | Ronan O'Connor | Eoghan Cooke | Rowan Montgomery |
| 2021 | Wicklow | Darren Rafferty | Dean Harvey | Jamie Meehan |
| 2022 | Kanturk | Oisin Ferrity | Niall McLaughlin | Patrick O’Loughlin |
| 2023 | Dungannon | Seth Dunwoody | Liam O'Brien | Cal Tutty |
| 2024 | Limerick | Patrick Casey | Samuel Coleman | Killian O'Brien |
| 2025 | | Conor Murphy | Rory Condon | Darragh Byrne |

=== Junior Women (Under 18) ===
| Year | Location | Gold | Silver | Bronze |
| 2001 | | Mary Boyd | | |
| 2004 | | Mary Brennan | | |
| 2008 | | Elaine Cawley | | |
| 2009 | Dunboyne | Mary Costello | Heather Byrne | Rachel Withers |
| 2010 | Sligo | Claire Oakley | Fiona Guihen | |
| 2015 | Cong | Ciara Doogan | Emily Birchall | Emer Harrisson |
| 2016 | Cong | Ciara Doogan (2) | Emily Birchall | Shauna McFadden |
| 2018 | Coolaney | Lara Gillespie | Maeve Gallagher | Gabriella Homer |
| 2019 | Derry City | Maeve Gallagher | Lara Gillespie | Caoimhe O’Brien |
| 2020 | Knockaderry, County Limerick | Ella Doherty | Caoimhe O'Brien | Elia Tutty |
| 2021 | Wicklow | Aoife O'Brien | Emma Smith | Annie Roche |
| 2022 | Kanturk | Erin Grace Creighton | Aoife O'Brien | Shauna Finn |
| 2023 | Dungannon | Lucy Benezet Minns | Aine Doherty | Lucy Brown |
| 2024 | Limerick | Lucy Benezet Minns (2) | Aliyah Rafferty | Aine Doherty |
| 2025 | | Aliyah Rafferty | Greta Lawless | Aoife O'Donovan |

== Time Trial ==
=== Amateur Men ===
| Year | 25ml | 50ml | 100ml | 12 hour |
| 1910 | | Freddie Grubb (GB) | | |
| 1911 | | Freddie Grubb (GB) | | |
| 1912 | | Freddie Grubb (GB) | | |
| 1913 | | Michael Walker ICA(maybe MS) | | |
| 1914 | J. J. Barnes (GAA) | | | |
| 1915 | J. J. Barnes (GAA) | | | |
| 1920 | J. J. Barnes (GAA) | | | |
| 1921 | J. McDonnell | | | |
| 1925 | C. Gibson | | | |
| 1926 | | | | |
| 1927 | M. Lynn | | | |
| 1928 | | | | |
| 1929 | Herbie Breadon | Jack Woodcock | Jack Woodcock | |
| 1930 | | Jack Woodcock | Jack Woodcock | |
| 1931 | | J. J. Masterson | J. J. Masterson | |
| 1932 | | Phil Brady | J.J. Masterson | |
| 1933 | | Tommy Quinn | Jack Woodcock | |
| 1934 | | Tommy Quinn | Tommy Quinn | |
| 1935 | | Tommy Quinn | Tommy Quinn | |
| 1936 | J. J. Bell (NACA, 25ml); Duff (NACA 25); Mick Clinton (NACA, 10ml); Tommy Quinn (CRE 25) | P. J. Byrne (NACA); Tommy Quinn (CRE) | Tommy Quinn (CRE) | |
| 1937 | | T. F. Hughes | Alo Donegan | |
| 1938 | | Tommy Quinn (CRE) | Alo Donegan (CRE) | Tommy Quinn |
| 1939 | | Matt Marlow (CRE); C. Gilmore (NACA) | Matt Marlow (CRE) | |
| 1940 | George Robinson (CRE) | T. Hughes (CRE) | Tommy Quinn (CRE) | |
| 1941 | George Robinson | Ollie Kelly or P. Brady | P. Brady | |
| 1942 | Ollie Kelly | T. O'Connor | Ollie Kelly | |
| 1943 | Johnny Mullen | Ollie Kelly | Ollie Kelly | |
| 1944 | Mick Anderson | Ollie Kelly | Ollie Kelly | |
| 1945 | Ollie Kelly | Ollie Kelly | No race | |
| 1946 | Ollie Kelly | Ollie Kelly | Ollie Kelly | |
| 1947 | J. Graham | Matt Marlow | Matt Marlow | |
| 1948 | ? | Ando Christle | M. Hensey | |
| 1949 | ? | Frank Baird | D. Tully | |
| 1950 | Ando Christle (NICF/CRE); C. Lavin (NCA) | Phil Reynolds (NCA); G.T. Wilkes (NICF/CRE) | No race | |
| 1951 | C. McIvor (NICF/CRE) | Johnny Heery (NCA); F. McKeown (NICF/CRE) | Karl McCarthy (NCA); G. Reid (NICF/CRE) | |
| 1952 | W. Long (NICF/CRE) | C. O'Rourke (NICF/CRE) | Karl McCarthy (NCA); J. Kane (NICF/CRE) | |
| 1953 | P. White (NCA); W.J. Dowds (NICF/CRE) | Karl McCarthy (NCA); W.J. Dowds (NICF/CRE) | P. White (NCA); W.J. Dowds (NICF/CRE) | |
| 1954 | Freddie O'Sullivan (NCA); W.J. Dowds (NICF/CRE) | P. White (NCA); R. Collim (NICF/CRE) | P. White (NCA); T. Smyth (NICF/CRE) | |
| 1955 | Tom Lavin (NCA); W.J. Dowds (NICF/CRE) | Tom Lavin (NCA); Tommy Talbot (NICF/CRE) | P. Callaghan (NCA); T. Allingham (NICF/CRE) | |
| 1956 | Tom Lavin (NCA); W. Kirk (NICF/CRE) | Mick Palmer (NCA); Morris Foster (NICF/CRE) | Cecil Donaghue (NCA); W. Kirk (NICF/CRE) | |
| 1957 | Tom Lavin (NCA); J. Fennell (NICF/CRE) | Joe Clarke (NCA); Tommy Talbot (NICF/CRE) | Bernie O'Brien (NCA); M. Donaldson (NICF/CRE) | M. Donaldson (NICF/CRE) |
| 1958 | Gene Mangan (NCA); J. Fennell (NICF/CRE) | Paddy Flanagan(NCA); J. Fennell (NICF/CRE) | M. Donaldson (NICF/CRE) | M. Donaldson (NICF/CRE) |
| 1959 | J. Fennell (NICF/CRE); Paddy Flanagan (NCA) | John Lackey (NICF/CRE); Paddy Flanagan (NCA) | J. Magill (NICF/CRE) | J. Magill (NICF/CRE) |
| 1960 | Shay O'Hanlon(NCA): Billy Kirk (NICF/CRE) | Paddy Flanagan (NCA); Sam Connor (NICF/CRE) | Sammy Kerr (NICF/CRE) | Michael Manley (NICF/CRE), |
| 1961 | John Lackey (CRE/NICF); Shay O'Hanlon (NCA) | John Lackey (CRE/NICF) | Jimmy Kennedy (CRE/NICF); Shay O'Hanlon (NCA) | Gordon Caldwell (NICF/CRE) |
| 1962 | Morris Foster (NICF/CRE) | Jack Murphy (NCA); Morris Foster (NICF/CRE) | Sammy Kerr (NICF/CRE) | Christy Kimmage (NICF/CRE) |
| 1963 | Sammy Kerr (CRE/NICF) | Sammy Kerr (CRE/NICF) | Joe Hadden (NICF/CRE) | Morris Foster (CRE/NICF) |
| 1964 | Paddy Flanagan (NCA); Morris Foster (CRE/NICF) | Morris Foster (CRE/NICF) | Sammy Kerr (CRE/NICF) | Joe Hadden (NICF/CRE) |
| 1965 | Paddy Flanagan (NCA); Joe Beggs (NICF/CRE) | Morris Foster (CRE/NICF) | Dave Kane (NICF/CRE) | E. Maxwell (NICF/CRE) |
| 1966 | Ned Flanagan (NCA); | Peter Doyle (CRE/NICF) | Peter Doyle (CRE/NICF) | Ceased |
| 1967 | J. Johnston (NICF/CRE); Kevin Dolan (NCA) | Paddy Flanagan (NCA); Morris Foster (CRE/NICF) | No race (NICF/CRE); Paddy Flanagan (NCA) | |
| 1968 | Paddy Flanagan (NICF/ICF); Kevin Dolan (NCA) | Morris Foster (NICF/ICF) | Morris Foster (NICF/ICF) | |
| 1969 | Billy Hudson (NICF/ICF); Seamus Kennedy (NCA) | Morris Foster (NICF/ICF) | Morris Foster (NICF/ICF) | |
| 1970 | Peter Doyle (NICF/ICF); Shay O'Hanlon(NCA) | Billy Hudson (NICF/ICF) | Morris Foster (NICF/ICF) | |
| 1971 | Peter Doyle (NICF/CRE); Batty Flynn (NCA) | Morris Foster (NICF/ICF) | Gordon Caldwell (NICF/ICF) | |
| 1972 | Christy Reynolds (NCA) | Phil O'Brien (ICF/NICF) | Morris Foster (NICF/ICF) | |
| 1973 | Mick Toolan (ICF/NICF); Paddy Flanagan (NCA) | Liam Horner (ICF/NICF) | Joe Smith (NICF/ICF) | |
| 1974 | Paddy Flanagan (NCA; John Shortt (CRE/NICF) | Billy Hudson (NICF/ICF) | Seán Darragh (CRE/NICF) – | |
| 1975 | Mick Toolan (ICF/NICF); Paddy Flanagan (NCA) | – | Billy Kerr (NICF/ICF) | |
| 1976 | Larry Clarke (NCA) | | | |
| 1977 | Paddy Flanagan (NCA) Brendan Madden (ICF/NICF) | | | |
| 1978 | | | | |
| 1979 | | | | |
| 1980 | | | | |
| 1981 | Billy Kerr | F. Townsley | R. Kennedy | |
| 1982 | Martin Quinn | | | |
| 1983 | Martin Quinn | | | |
| 1984 | | | Eddie Madden | |
| 1985 | | Martin Quinn | | |
| 1986 | Paul Madden | | | |
| 1987 | Paul Madden | | Paul Madden | |
| 1988 | Anthony O'Gorman | Anthony O'Gorman | | |
| 1989 | Paul Slane | Joe Barr | | |
| 1990 | Philip Cassidy (25; John Heraty (10) | Philip Cassidy | | |
| 1991 | Declan Lonergan (25ml); Julian Dalby (10ml) | Julian Dalby | | |
| 1992 | Éamonn Byrne (25); Philip Collins (10) | Philip Collins | | |
| 1993 | Tommy Evans | – | | |
| 1994 | Stephen Maher | Philip Collins | | |
| 1995 | Philip Collins | Scott Hamilton | | |
| 1996 | Scott Hamilton | Scott Hamilton | | |
| 1994 | Philip Collins (10 ml) | Ken Tobin (10 ml) | Joe Fenlon (10 ml) | |
| 1995 | Philip Collins (10 ml) | | | |
| 1996 | Scott Hamilton (10 ml) | | | |

=== Elite Men ===
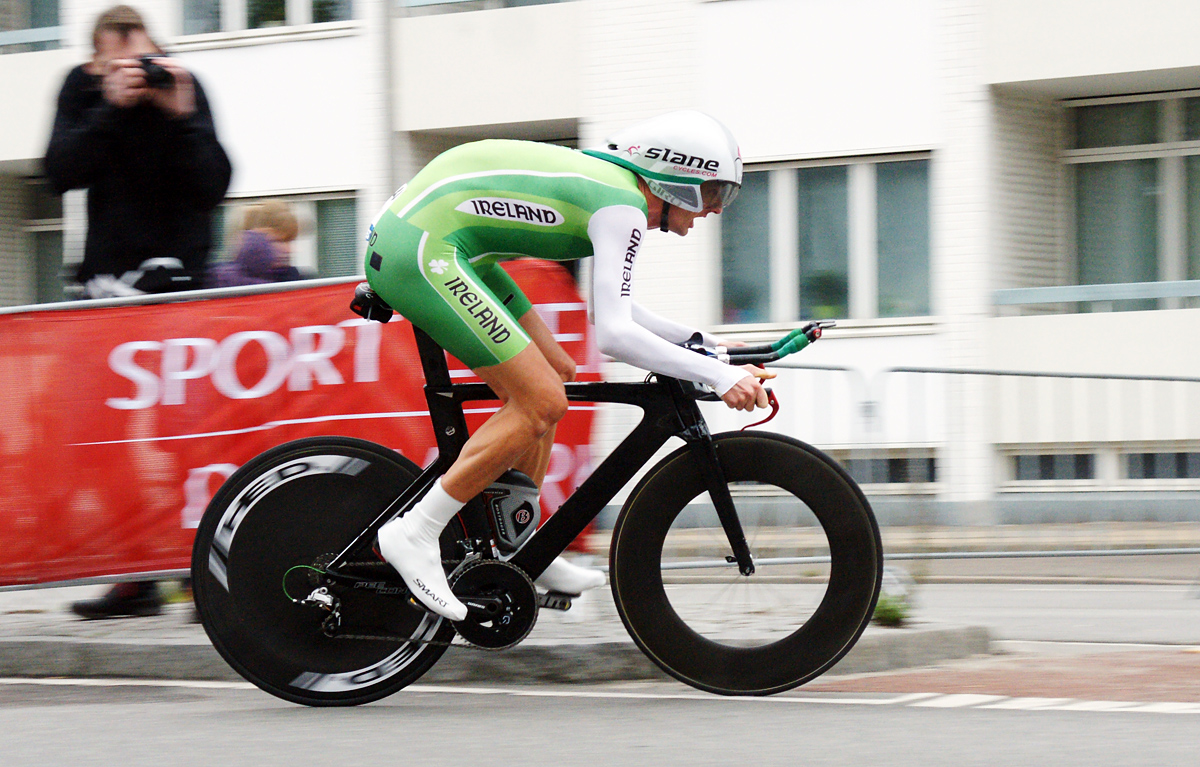
David McCann

| Year (distance) | Location | Gold | Silver | Bronze |
| 1997 25ml | Rosslare | Scott Hamilton | Tommy Evans | Simon Coughlan |
| 1997 50ml | | Ian Chivers | | |
| 1997 10ml | | Scott Hamilton | | |
| 1998 (10ml) | | Scott Hamilton (2) | Jaime Hunter | Paul Healion |
| 1998 (25ml) | | Scott Hamilton (3) | David McCann | Jamie Hunter |
| 1999 (10ml) | | Philip Cassidy | David Peelo | Tommy Evans |
| 1999 (25ml) | | Andrew Roche | Brian Kenneally | John Grant |
| 1999 50ml | | Paddy Moriarty | Tommy Evans | David Peelo |
| 2000 25ml | | Paul Healion | Ryan Hamilton | Shane Pendergast |
| 2000 10ml | | Jonathon Dempsey | | |
| 2000 50ml | | Brian Kenneally | | |
| 2001 (40 km) | Castlebar | David McCann | Paul Kane | Paul Healion |
| 2002 (43 km) | Navan | David McCann (2) | David O'Loughlin | Andrew Donnellan |
| 2003 (40 km) | Enniscorthy | David O'Loughlin | Brian Kenneally | Paul Healion |
| 2004 (38 km) | Killorglin | David McCann (3) | David O'Loughlin | Stephen Gallagher |
| 2005 | Carlow | David McCann (4) | Andrew Roche | Tommy Evans |
| 2006 (40.2 km) | Bridgend, County Donegal | David O'Loughlin (2) | Paul Healion | Tommy Evans |
| 2007 (34 km) | Dungarvan | Nicolas Roche | David McCann | David O'Loughlin |
| 2008 (48 km) | Raheen | Paul Healion (2) | Neil Delahaye | John Heverin |
| 2009 (40 km) | Swinford | David McCann (5) | Martyn Irvine | Con Collis |
| 2010 (30.4 km) | Colooney, Sligo | David McCann (6) | Martyn Irvine | Aaron Buggle |
| 2011 (40 km) | Emyvale | Matt Brammeier | David McCann | Michael Hutchinson |
| 2012 (35 km) | Cahir | Michael Hutchinson | Martyn Irvine | Nicolas Roche |
| 2013 (40 km) | Carlingford | Michael Hutchinson (2) | David McCann | Colm Cassidy |
| 2014 (37 km) | Rochfortbridge | Michael Hutchinson (3) | Colm Cassidy | Martyn Irvine |
| 2015 (37 km) | Omagh, County Tyrone | Ryan Mullen | Eddie Dunbar | Martyn Irvine |
| 2016 (40 km) | Kilcullen | Nicolas Roche (2) | Eddie Dunbar | Ryan Mullen |
| 2017 (34 km) | Johnstown, County Wexford | Ryan Mullen (2) | Nicolas Roche | Marcus Christie |
| 2018 | Coolaney | Ryan Mullen (3) | Marcus Christie | Paul Kennedy |
| 2019 | Derry City | Ryan Mullen (4) | Eddie Dunbar | Craig McAuley |
| 2020 | Knockaderry, County Limerick | Conn McDunphy | Nicolas Roche | Lindsay Watson |
| 2021 (33.79 km) | County Wicklow | Ryan Mullen (5) | Nicolas Roche | Marcus Christie |
| 2022 (32.13 km) | Nenagh | Ben Healy | George Peden | Eddie Dunbar |
| 2023 (31.2 km) | Dungannon | Ryan Mullen (6) | Ben Healy | George Peden |
| 2024 (36.6 km) | Athea, Co.Limerick | Eddie Dunbar | Ryan Mullen | George Peden |
| 2025 (25.4 km) | Kilbeggan, Westmeath | Ryan Mullen (7) | George Peden | Darren Rafferty |

=== Amateur Women ===
| Year | Location | Gold | Silver | Bronze |
| 1941(25) | | Margaret Radburn | | |
| 1944 | | Margaret Radburn | | |
| 1954 | | B. Doonan (NICF/CRE) | | |
| 1955 | | I. Clements (NICF/CRE) | | |
| 1956 | | I. Woods (NICF/CRE) | | |
| 1984 | | Debbie Kane | | |
| 1990 | | Marie Eribo (Marie Eribo 10ml) | | |
| 1991 | | (Marie Eribo 10ml) | | |
| 1992 | | Claire Moore (Marie Eribo 10ml) | | |
| 1993 | | Claire Moore | | |
| 1994 | | Claire Moore (Claire Moore 10ml) | | |
| 1995 | | Claire Moore (Claire Moore 10ml) | | |
| 1996 | | Geraldine Gill (Marie Boyle 10ml) | | |

=== Elite Women ===
| Year | Location | Gold | Silver | Bronze |
| 1997 | | (Marie O'Reilly 10ml) | | |
| 1998 (10ml) | | Marie Reilly | Jane McGoey | Louise Quinlan |
| 1998 (25ml) | | Marie Reilly | Jane McGoey | Aisling Baird |
| 1999 | | Geraldine Gill (Marie Reilly 10ml) | Avril Swan | Susan O'Mara |
| 2000 | | Sheila Rafferty (Marie Reilly 10ml) | Marie Reilly | |
| 2001 | Castlebar | Susan O'Mara | Debbie Booth | Sheila Rafferty |
| 2002 (23 km) | Navan | Geraldine Gill | Louise Moriarty | Sheila Rafferty |
| 2003 | Enniscorthy | Kate Rudd | Marie Reilly | Susan O'Mara |
| 2004 | Killorglin | Siobhán Dervan | | |
| 2005 | Carlow | Jenny Fay | | |
| 2006 | | Louise Moriarty | Heather Wilson | |
| 2007 | Dungarvan | Louise Moriarty (2) | Jenny Fay | Heather Wilson |
| 2008 | Raheen | Olivia Dillon | Heather Wilson | Louise Moriarty |
| 2009 | Castlebar | Olivia Dillon (2) | Heather Wilson | Heather Boyle |
| 2010 (20 km) | Colooney, Sligo | Olivia Dillon (3) | Heather Wilson | Joanna Hickey |
| 2011 (40 km) | Emyvale | Caroline Ryan | Heather Wilson | Jane Kilmartin |
| 2012 (35 km) | Cahir | Olivia Dillon (4) | Melanie Späth | Siobhan Horgan |
| 2013 | Carlingford | Caroline Ryan (2) | Melanie Späth | Eve McCrystal |
| 2014 (37 km) | Rochfortbridge | Caroline Ryan (3) | Lauren Creamer | Francine Meehan |
| 2015 (37 km) | Omagh, County Tyrone | Siobhán Horgan (2) | Eve McCrystal | Caroline Ryan |
| 2016 (40 km) | Kilcullen | Anna Turvey | Eve McCrystal | Lydia Gurley |
| 2017 34 km) | Johnstown, County Wexford | Eileen Burns | Kelly Murphy | Eve McCrystal |
| 2018 | Coolaney | Kelly Murphy | Eileen Burns | Eve McCrystal |
| 2019 | Derry City | Kelly Murphy (2) | Anna Turvey | Eileen Burns |
| 2020 | Knockaderry, County Limerick | Eve McCrystal | Kelly Murphy | Eileen Burns |
| 2021 (33.79 km) | Wicklow | Joanna Patterson | Eve McCrystal | Linda Kelly |
| 2022 | Nenagh | Kelly Murphy (3) | Joanna Patterson | Eve McCrystal |
| 2023 (31.2 km) | Dungannon | Kelly Murphy (4) | Joanna Patterson | Linda Kelly |
| 2024 (36.6 km) | Athea, Col.Limerick | Fiona Mangan | Annalise Murphy | Roisin Thomas |
| 2025 | Kilbeggan, Westmeath | Kelly Murphy (5) | Linda Kelly | Mia Griffin |

=== Under 23 Men (Espoir) ===
| Year | Location | Gold | Silver | Bronze |
| 2004 | | Michael Concannon | | Gareth Rogers |
| 2005 | Carlow | Ryan Connor | Michael Concannon | Martyn Irvine |
| 2006 | Burt, County Donegal | Ryan Connor (2) | | James Whelan |
| 2007 | Dungarvan | Paul Brady | Michael Murray | Martyn Irvine |
| 2008 | Raheen | Denis Dunworth | Adam Armstrong | Ronan McLaughlin |
| 2009 | Castlebar | Aaron Buggle | Thomas Martin | Conor McAllister |
| 2010 (40 km) | Colooney, Sligo | Aaron Buggle (2) | Marcus Christie | Conor McAllister |
| 2011 (40 km) | Emyvale | Sean Downey | Felix English | Tighernach Murphy |
| 2012 (35 km) | Cahir | Conor Dunne | Sean Downey | Aaron Buggle |
| 2013 | Carlingford | Ryan Mullen | Conor Dunne | Marcus Christie |
| 2014 (37 km) | Rochfortbridge | Ryan Mullen (2) | Sean Hahessy | Daniel Stewart |
| 2015 (37 km) | Omagh, County Tyrone | Ryan Mullen (3) | Eddie Dunbar | Mark Downey |
| 2016 (40 km) | Kilcullen | Eddie Dunbar | Ryan Mullen | Michael O'Loughlin |
| 2017 (34 km) | Wexford | Michael O'Loughlin | Conn McDunphy | Eddie Dunbar |
| 2018 (?? km) | Colloney | Michael O'Loughlin (2) | Conn McDunphy | Xeno Young |
| 2019 (41 km) | Derry City | Michael O'Loughlin (3) | Ben Healy | Luke Smith |
| 2020 | Knockaderry, County Limerick | Ben Healy | Kevin McCambridge | Mitchell McLaughlin |
| 2021 (34 km) | Wicklow | Kevin McCambridge | George Peden | Cian Keogh |
| 2022 | Nenagh | Darren Rafferty | Kevin McCambridge | Adam Ward |
| 2023 | Dungannon | Darren Rafferty (2) | Dean Harvey | Kevin McCambridge |
| 2024 (36.6 km) | Athea, Co.Limerick | Adam Rafferty | Dean Harvey | Liam O'Brien |
| 2025 | | Adam Rafferty (2) | Seth Dunwoody | Liam O'Brien |

=== Junior Men ===
| Year | 25 Location | 25 Gold | 25 Silver | 25 Bronze | Other distances |
| 1934 | | | | | J.W. Shaw (50ml) |
| 1935 | | | | | J.D. Hurley (50ml) |
| 1936 | | Frank Baird (NACA); | | | J.J. Garry (CRE, 50ml); C. Sweeney (NACA, 50ml) |
| 1937 | | F. Brooks (NACA) | | | J. O'Callaghan (50ml) |
| 1938 | | | | | W. Barclay (CRE, 50ml) |
| 1939 | | | | | W. Byrne (CRE?, 50ml) |
| 1940 | | | | | J.J. Whyte (CRE, 50ml) |
| 1946 | | G. Rogers | | | |
| 1969 | | D. Beattie (NICF/CRE) | | | |
| 1970 | | K. Ritchie (NICF/CRE) | | | |
| 1971 | | | | | |
| 1972 | Navan Road | Sean Kelly | Alec. Darragh | | |
| 1973 | | Martin McQuillan (NICF/CRE) | | | |
| 1974 | | T. Green (NICF/CRE) | | | |
| 1975 | | S. Montgomery (NICF/CRE) | | | |
| 1981 | | G. Keating | G.Thompson | | |
| 1982 | | | | | |
| 1983 | | | | | |
| 1988 | | Donal O'Halloran | | | |
| 1989 | | David Fowler | | | |
| 1990 | | (Philip Collins 10ml) | | | |
| 1991 | | Mark Hutton | | | Michael Steed 10ml |
| 1992 | | Mark Hutton | | | Stephen O'Sullivan 10ml |
| 1993 | Wexford | Cathal Dolan | Simon Coughlan | Ken Tobin | |
| 1994 | | Aidan Duff | Michael Woods | | Aidan Duff 10ml |
| 1995 | | Kirk Sloan | | | Raymond Corbett "10" |
| 1996 | | David O'Loughlin | | | Barry Twohig "10" |
| 1997 | | Mark Scanlon | | | David Coughlin "10" |
| 1998 | | Brendan O'Brien | Clive Stevenson | Raymond Dunlop | Brendan O'Brien(10ml) |
| 1999 | | Thomas Lavery | Timothy Ahern | | Brendan O'Brien 10ml |
| 2000 | | Ollie Grey (John O'Shea 10ml) | | Timothy Ahern | |
| 2001 (21ml) | Castlebar | John O'Shea | Nicolas Roche | Michael Concannon | |
| 2001 | | Shaun Turner | Ryan Connor | P. Hanna | |
| 2002 | Navan | Theo Hardwick | Micheal Concannon | Barry Woods | |
| 2003 | Enniscorthy | Theo Hardwick | Paul Brady | O.Concannon | |
| 2004 | Killorglin | James Whelan | | | |
| 2005 | | Ciarán Kelly | | | |
| 2006 (40 km) | Burt, County Donegal | Thomas Martin | Diarmuid Ó Cróinín, Denis Dunworth (tied) | (none) | |
| 2007 | | Seán Downey | Denis Dunworth | | |
| 2008 | | Seán Downey | | | |
| 2009 | | Marcus Christie | | | |
| 2010 (20 km) | Colooney, Sligo | Aaron Baines | Ewan McDonald | Gavin Keane | |
| 2011 (30 km) | Castlebar | Ryan Mullen | Eoin McCarthy | Matt Heaney | |
| 2012 (31 km) | Blackrock, County Louth | Ryan Mullen (2) | Mathew Doyle | Daniel Stewart | |
| 2013 | | Eddie Dunbar | | | |
| 2014 (40 km) | Blarney | Mark Downey | Michael O'Loughlin | Eddie Dunbar | |
| 2015 | Cong | Michael O'Loughlin | Simon Tuomey | Cathal Purcell | |
| 2016 | | | | | |
| 2017 | County Londonderry | Ben Walsh | Xeno Young | Ethan Downey | |
| 2018 | Colooney | Ben Healy | Aaron Doherty | Breandán Flannagan | |
| 2019 | Derry City | Kevin McCambridge | Archie Ryan | Finley Newmark | |
| 2020 | Knockaderry, County Limerick | Darren Rafferty | Matthew Devins | Tom Moriarty | |
| 2021 | Wicklow | Darren Rafferty (2) | Ronan O'Connor | Stefan Caulfield-Dreier | |
| 2022 | Nenagh | Conal Scully | Quillen Donnelly | Adam Rafferty | |
| 2023 | Dungannon | Adam Rafferty | Liam O'Brien | Patrick Casey | |
| 2024 | Athea, Co.Limerick | Conor Murphy | Seth Dunwoody | Patrick Casey | |
| 2025 | | Conor Murphy (2) | Matthew Walls | David Gaffney | |

=== Junior Women (Under 18) ===
| Year | Location | Gold | Silver | Bronze |
| 2001 | | Mary Boyd | | |
| 2003 | | Mary Brennan | | |
| 2004 | | Mary Brennan | | |
| 2009 | | | | |
| 2010 | | | | |
| 2015 | Cong | Ciara Doogan | Emily Birchall | Naoise Sheridan |
| 2020 | Knockaderry, County Limerick | Caoimhe May | Eva Brennan | Lucy O'Donnell |
| 2021 | Wicklow | Caoimhe May (2) | Katie Neill | Maria McAllister |
| 2022 | Nenagh | Shauna Finn | Katie Reilly | Erin Grace Creighton |
| 2023 | Dungannon | Lucy Benezet Minns | Aine Doherty | Lucy Brown |
| 2024 | Athea, Co.Limerick | Lucy Benezet Minns (2) | Aliyah Rafferty | Kate Murphy |
| 2025 | | Aliyah Rafferty | Sophie English | Ffion Dolan |

=== Tandem men ===
| Year | Winners |
| 1931 | Tommy Walsh & M. K.Masterson |
| 1932 | Bertie Donnelly & M. K. Masterson |
| 1933 | Bertie Donnelly & M. K. Masterson |
| 1934 | Bertie Donnelly & T. B. Fortune |
| 1935 | Bertie & Nicky Donnelly |
| 1936 | Tommy Quinn/J. J. Mofatt |
| 1937 | Tommy Quinn/Herbie Breadon (50 miles) |
| 1938 | Tommy Quinn/W. J. Broughal |
| 1939 | |
| 1940 | Tommy Quinn & J. Kirwan |
| 1941 | M.McCarthy & J. Kirwan |
| 1942 | K. Freeney & J. J. Shortall |
| 2004 | Gerry Beggs/Leslie Creighton |
| 2005 | Simon Mulvaney/Craig Weetnam |
| 2006 | Michael Dalawek/David Peelo |
| 2007 | G. Crothers/Paul McMinn |
| 2008 | David Peelo/Michael Delaney |
| 2009 | Padraig Marrey/Joseph Marrey |
| 2010 | Andy Fitzgerald/Paul Giblin |
| 2011 | Oriol Carbo and Kazak Jankowski |
| 2012 | D. Harrington and P. Marrey |
| 2020 | Damien Vereker |
| 2021 | Damien Vereker/Marcin Mizgajski |

== Track racing ==
1875–1905: Richard J. Mecredy, Arthur du Cros, Charlie Pease, Bob Reynolds 9 Championships each, Harry Reynolds 5 Championships, R. Hassard 6 Championships

25ml track: 1889: Arthur du Cros; 1890 & 1891 R.J. Mecredy; 1895: Harry Large; 1896: Harry Reynolds; 1909 Sam Cochrane; 1924 Culvenor Gibson.

50ml track: 1876: H. H. Law; 1896: M. S. Walsh;

1890s R. J. Mecredy won the 2nd 100ml championship

Inter Club Team Championship: 1886, 1887: Leinster C.C.

1895 track: J. Mackey

1896 &1898 L. R. Oswald-Healy of DUBC won an Irish championship

1904 motor paced: Harry Mussen

=== 440yds, 880yds, 1ml, 2ml, 3ml, 4ml. ===
| Year | 1/4ml | 1/2ml | 1ml | 2ml | 3ml | 4ml |
| 1875 | – | – | A. C. Rodgers | | | E. C. Hodgson |
| 1876 | – | – | A. H. Pring | | | W. P. Blood |
| 1877 | – | – | A. C. Rodgers | | | R. Hassard |
| 1878 | – | – | Alfred Spring | | | H. H. Law |
| 1879 | – | – | Alfred Spring | | | R. Hassard |
| 1880 | – | – | Herbert M. Wright | | | A. M. Toomes |
| 1881 | – | – | Herbert M. Wright | | | Herbert M. Wright |
| 1882 | – | – | J. H. Craig | | | J. A. Craig |
| 1883 | – | – | F. J. Levis | | | F. J. Levis |
| 1884 | – | – | Elrington S. McKay | | | Elrington S. McKay |
| 1885 | – | – | F. J. Levis | | | F. J. Levis |
| 1886 | – | – | R. J. Mecredy (bicycle & tricycle) | R. J. Mecredy | | R. J. Mecredy |
| 1887 | – | – | C. F. Williamson; (R. J. Mecredy tricycle) | | | C. F. Williamson |
| 1888 | – | B. B.(Ben) Tuke | C. F. Williamson | | | No race |
| 1889 | – | Arthur du Cros | Arthur du Cros | | | No race |
| 1890 | – | R. J. Mecredy | Arthur du Cros | | | No race |
| 1891 | – | Arthur du Cros | Arthur du Cros | | | No race |
| 1892 | – | R. J. Mecredy | R. J. Mecredy | | | No race |
| 1893 | – | E. O'Callaghan | T. Torsney | | | |
| 1894 | – | H. O'Neill | H. O'Neill | | | |
| 1895 | – | R. M. Poole | T. Summersgill | | | |
| 1896 | – | Harry Reynolds | Harry Reynolds | | | |
| 1897 | – | J. Crean | W. H. Meredith | | | |
| 1898 | – | Charlie Pease | Bob Reynolds | | | |
| 1899 | – | P. Pease | J. Caldew | | | |
| 1900 | – | Charlie Pease | Charlie Pease | | | |
| 1901 | – | Bob Reynolds | Charlie Pease | | | |
| 1902 | – | No race | Bob Reynolds | | | |
| 1903 | J. Martin | Bob Reynolds | E. Martin | | | |
| 1904 | No race | E. Martin | W. F. Magee | | | |
| 1905 | J. S. Benyon (Wales) | No race | W. F. Magee | | | |
| 1906 | H. D. Buck | B. Jones | J.Lavery (ICA); W. Mulcahy (GAA) | | P. Coyle (GAA) | |
| 1907 | | J. Laverty | P. J. Ross (GAA) | | P. J. Ross | |
| 1908 | J. Lavery | P. J. Ross, Dundalk, (GAA?). C. B. Kingsbury, Portsmouth (ICA?) | B. Jones (UK) | | | |
| 1909 | | | | Harry Reynolds | Jack Reynolds | |
| 1910 | | A. Hodgetts (UK) | | | | |
| 1911 | J.J. Dillon | R. A. Gough | W.A. Campbell | | Miley Byrne | |
| 1912 | R. Lynch(GAA) | W. A. Campbell(GAA) | Vic Johnson(ICA); W. A. Campbell (GAA) | | F. Thornton (GAA) | W. A. Campbell(GAA) |
| 1913 | | | Vic Johnson | | | |
| 1914 | | | J. Sullivan (GAA) | | | |
| 1915 | T. Rogers (GAA) | J. P. Mangan (GAA) | | | | |
| 1916 | | | | | | J. J. Barnes (GAA) |
| 1917 | | | | | | |
| 1918 | | | Charles Davis | W. A. Campbell (GAA) | W. A. Campbell (GAA) | J.J. Barnes (GAA) |
| 1919 | T. Rogers (GAA) | | B. J. Donnelly (GAA) | J. J. Barnes (GAA) | | |
| 1920 | | | | | | |
| 1921 | | W. A. Campbell (GAA) handicap | Bertie Donnelly | | | |
| 1922 | Bertie Donnelly | | T. Berney (Kilcock) | J. J. Barnes | | |
| 1923 | Bertie Donnelly | Bertie Donnelly | Bertie Donnelly | Bertie Donnelly | J. J. Barnes | Bertie Donnelly |
| 1924 | M. J.(T. J.?) Lynn | Bertie Donnelly | M. J. Lynn or J. P. Clarke | Bertie Donnelly | J. C. Beare | Bertie Donnelly |
| 1925 | Nicky Donnelly | | Bertie Donnelly or J.P. Clarke | | | Bertie Donnelly |
| 1926 | Nicky Donnelly | | M. J. Lynn | | | |
| 1927 | Bertie Donnelly | | Nicky Donnelly | | | |
| 1928 | Nicky Donnelly | | Nicky Donnelly | | | |
| 1929 | T.J. O'Sullivan | | Bertie Donnelly | | Nicky Donnelly | |
| 1930 | Herbie Breadon | | Bertie Donnelly | | Bertie Donnelly | Bertie Donnelly |
| 1931 | Bertie Donnelly | | | | Bertie Donnelly | |
| 1932 | Bertie Donnelly | | | | Bertie Donnelly | |
| 1933 | Bertie Donnelly or Nicky Donnelly | | | | Bertie Donnelly | |
| 1934 | Nicky Donnelly | | Alo Donegan | | Bertie Donnelly/Alo Donegan tie | |
| 1935 | | | | | | |
| 1936 | Tommy Fortune | Tommy Quinn (CRE); C. Guest (NACA); Tommy Quinn (CRE) | C. Guest (NACA) | Matt Sandes (NACA) | Alo Donegan (CRE); Matt Sandes (NACA) | |
| 1937 | | Bertie or Nicky Donnelly (NACA) | Alo Donegan (CRE);Nicky Donnelly (NACA) | | Alo Donegan (CRE) | |
| 1938 | 0 | 0 | T. Crossan (CRE); Matt Linehan (NACA) | Matt Lenihan | Matt Sandes (NACA); Alo Donegan (CRE) | 0 |
| 1939 | 0 | 0 | 0 | Frank Baird | Frank Baird (NACA); Tommy Quinn (CRE) | 0 |
| 1940 | Bertie Donnelly | Gerry Dunne | Frank Baird | W. G. Robinson | Gerry Dunne | 0 |
| 1941 | 0 | 0 | Gerry Dunne | Frank Baird | M. Kelly | 0 |
| 1942 | 0 | Frank Baird | Frank Baird | Vinnie Lyons | Mick Anderson | 0 |
| 1943 | 0 | Tommy Quinn | Mick Anderson | Seán Donnelly | Mick Anderson | 0 |
| 1944 | Seán Donnelly | Seán Donnelly | Vinnie Lyons | Seán Donnelly | Mick Anderson | Mick Anderson |
| 1945 | N. Fogarty | Vinny Lyons | E. Meagher | Frank Baird | Mick Anderson | Seán Donnelly |
| 1946 | Vinny Lyons | Frank Baird | Vinny Lyons | 0 | K. Lynch | Frank Baird |
| 1947 | Vinny Lyons | Vinny Lyons | Vinny Lyons | Vinny Lyons | Vinny Lyons | Vinny Lyons |
| 1948 | 0 | Vinny Lyons | Vinny Lyons | Vinny Lyons | J. Garvin | Vinny Lyons |
| 1949 | 0 | 0 | Frank Baird | Frank Baird | Seán Donnelly | Frank Baird |
| 1950 | 0 | Mick Cahill | Seán Donnelly | J. J. McCormack | Karl McCarthy | J.J. McCormack |
| 1951 | Mick Cahill | Seán Donnelly | Mick Cahill | J. J. McCormack | J.J. McCormack | 0 |
| 1952 | Seán Donnelly | T. Duggan | Seán Donnelly | Frank Baird | Mick Cahill | V. Quinn |
| 1953 | Frank Baird | Frank Baird | Mick Cahill | Frank Baird | Finbar Twomey | Frank Baird |
| 1954 | Séamus O'Reilly | Nicky Thorpe(NCA); Jim McQuaid (CRE/NICF) | Frank Baird(NCA); J. McCauley (NICF/CRE) | Frank O'Sullivan | Séamus O'Reilly (NCA); J.J. McCormack (CRE/NICF) | P. Cahill |
| 1955 | Frank O'Sullivan (NCA); J. Ewart (NICF/CRE) | Séamus O'Reilly(NCA); L. Feeny (CRE/NICF) | Frank O'Sullivan(NCA); J. Ewart(NICF/CRE) | F. Twomey | Séamus O'Reilly | F. Twomey |
| 1956 | Frank O'Sullivan | Frank O'Sullivan (NCA); Martin McKay (NICF/CRE) | Séamus O'Reilly (NCA); Jim McQuaid (CRE/NICF) | Mick Carr | Mick Cahill | Frank O'Sullivan |
| 1957 | Gene Mangan | Frank O'Sullivan | Séamus O'Reilly(NCA); Martin McKay (NICF/CRE) | Séamus O'Reilly | Frank O'Sullivan | Frank O'Sullivan |
| 1958 | Gene Mangan | Tom Kirk(NCA); H. Smith (CRE/NICF) | Frank O'Sullivan(NCA); Basil Whelan (CRE/NICF) | Jerome Dorgan | Frank Baird | 0 |
| 1959 | Frank O'Sullivan | Jim Maguire (NICF/CRE); Frank O'Sullivan (NCA) | Frank O'Sullivan | Frank O'Sullivan | | |
| 1960 | Frank O'Sullivan | Séamus Herron (NICF/CRE) | Mick Finnegan | | Dermot Byrne | |
| 1961 | Frank O'Sullivan | Frank O'Sullivan | | Frank O'Sullivan | | |
| 1962 | Frank O'Sullivan | Frank O'Sullivan(NCA); W.L. White (NICF/CRE) | Frank O'Sullivan | Frank O'Sullivan(NCA); W.L. White (CRE/NICF) | Shay O'Hanlon | |
| 1963 | | Kit O'Rourke (CRE/NICF) | Frank O'Sullivan | S. Wilson (NICF/CRE) | | |
| 1964 | | Mick Finnegan(NCA); J. Watson (NICF/CRE) | | D. Dobbin (NICF/CRE) | | |
| 1965 | Frank O'Sullivan | Séamus Herron (NICF/CRE) | Eddie Dunne | Frank O'Sullivan(NCA); Dave Kane (NICF/CRE) | Paddy Flanagan | |
| 1966 | | Frank O'Sullivan(NCA); Séamus Herron (NICF/CRE) | Mick Finnegan | Dave Kane (NICF/CRE); Barry Dorgan (NCA) | Tony McNabb | |
| 1967 | | Mick Finnegan(NCA); Hughie Davis (CRE/NICF) | Gene Mangan | Mick Finnegan(NCA); Morris Foster (NICF/CRE) | Senan Noonan | |
| 1968 | | | Shay O'Hanlon | Dave Kane (NICF/CRE) | Shay O'Hanlon | |
| 1969 | Frank O'Sullivan (NCA) | Seamus Kennedy | Christy Reynolds (NCA) | | Kevin Dolan(NCA) Mick Finnegan (ICF/NICF) | |
| 1970 | Eddie Dunne (ICF) | F. O'Sullivan (ICF/NICF) | F. O'Sullivan (ICF/NICF) | S. Murphy (NICF/CRE) | F. O'Sullivan (ICF/NICF) | |
| 1971 | Frank O'Sullivan (ICF/NICF) | W. Baggott (ICF/NICF) | W. Baggott (ICF/NICF) | P. Greene (ICF/NICF) | P. Hegarty (ICF/NICF) | |
| 1972 | Eddie Dunne (ICF) | W. Baggott (ICF/NICF) | John Hegarty (ICF/NICF) | Donal Crowley (CRE/NICF) | W. Baggott (ICF/NICF) | |
| 1973 | | Eddie Dunne (ICF) | John Hegarty (ICF/NICF) | John Hegarty (ICF/NICF) | Brendan Madden (CRE/NICF) | |
| 1974 | | | Jack Murphy | | | |
| 1975 | | | Noel Clarke | | Seamus Kennedy | |

=== 5ml; 5ml Pt. to Pt.; 10ml; 500m; 1,000m; 2,000m ===
| Year | 5ml | 5ml Pt. to Pt. | 10ml | 500m | 1,000m | 2,000m |
| 1876 | No race | | R. Hassard | | | |
| 1877 | No race | | R. Hassard | | | |
| 1878 | No race | | H. H. Law | | | |
| 1879 | No race | | R. Hassard | | | |
| 1880 | No race | | A. M. Toomes | | | |
| 1881 | No race | | P. H. W.Jones | | | |
| 1882 | No race | | W. M. Woodside | | | |
| 1883 | No race | | F. J. Levis | | | |
| 1885 | No race | | | | | |
| 1886 | No race | | C. F. Williamson | | | |
| 1887 | No race | | | | | |
| 1888 | Patrick Percy Kilkelly | | | | | |
| 1889 | Arthur du Cros | | John Piers Butler | | | |
| 1890 | Patrick Percy Kilkelly | R. J. Mecredy | | | | |
| 1891 | R.J.Mecredy | | R. J. Mecredy | | | |
| 1892 | P. J. Kenna | | | | | |
| 1893 | Harry Reynolds (ICA?) E. O'Callaghan (GAA?) | | | | | |
| 1894 | Harry Reynolds | | | | | |
| 1895 | | | Harry Large | | | |
| 1896 | | | L. R. Oswald | | | |
| 1897 | | | | | | |
| 1898 | McWilliam Burke | | Bob Reynolds | | | |
| 1900 | Bob Reynolds | | | | | |
| 1902 | Bob Reynolds | | | | | |
| 1906 | | | A. J. Sweeney | | | |
| 1907 | | | | | | |
| 1908 | F. Thompson | | J. Robertson | | | |
| 1909 | | | | John Robertson | | |
| 1910 | Patrick Flood | | | | | |
| 1911 | Harry O'Sullivan | Miley Byrne | | | | |
| 1920 | Tom Rodgers | | | | | |
| 1921 | | | | | | |
| 1922 | J. J. Barnes (GAA?); Bertie Donnelly (NACA?) | | | | | |
| 1923 | Bertie Donnelly | | Bertie Donnelly | | | |
| 1924 | M. Lynn | | | | | |
| 1925 | Bertie Donnelly | | | | | |
| 1926 | Tom Rodgers | | Mick Lynn | | | |
| 1927 | Bertie Donnelly | | Bertie Donnelly | | | |
| 1928 | | | M. Lynn/Bertie Donnelly tied | | | |
| 1929 | | | Bertie Donnelly | | | |
| 1930 | | | Bertie Donnelly | | Herbie Breadon | |
| 1931 | | | | | Bertie Donnelly | |
| 1932 | | | | | Bertie Donnelly | |
| 1933 | | | | | Alo Donegan | |
| 1934 | | | | | Bertie Donnelly | |
| 1935 | | | | | Tommy Quinn | |
| 1936 | | | | | Herbie Breadon (CRE); Tommy Fortune (NACA) | |
| 1937 | Frank Baird | | | | Bertie Donnelly (NACA); J. J. O'Connell (CRE) | Bertie Donnelly (NACA) |
| 1938 | Frank Baird | 0 | Bertie Donnelly | 0 | J. Lynch(NCA) Alo Donegan (CRE) | 0 |
| 1939 | R. Gilmore | 0 | Frank Baird | 0 | Frank Baird | 0 |
| 1940 | W. G. Robinson | 0 | 0 | 0 | W. G. Robinson | 0 |
| 1941 | Frank Baird | 0 | Frank Baird | 0 | Frank Baird | 0 |
| 1942 | J. J. Foley | 0 | Vinnie Lyons | 0 | Frank Baird | Tommy Quinn |
| 1943 | Seán Donnelly | 0 | Seán Donnelly | Seán Donnelly | Seán Donnelly | Seán Donnelly |
| 1944 | Gerry Dunne | 0 | Seán Donnelly | Frank Baird; Seán Donnelly | Seán Donnelly | Frank Baird; Seán Donnelly |
| 1945 | Frank Baird | Seán Donnelly | Seán Donnelly | Frank Baird | Seán Donnelly | Frank Baird |
| 1946 | 0 | Frank Baird | Dick Walsh | Vinnie Lyons | Vinnie Lyons | Frank Baird |
| 1947 | Vinny Lyons | Dick Walsh | 0 | Jim McQuaid | Vinny Lyons | Vinny Lyons |
| 1948 | Vinny Lyons | 0 | 0 | Frank Baird | Vinny Lyons | Vinny Lyons |
| 1949 | Frank Baird | 0 | 0 | Seán Donnelly | J. J. McCormack | Frank Baird |
| 1950 | J.J. McCormack | J.J. McCormack | G. Duggan | G. Duggan | G. Duggan | G. Duggan |
| 1951 | J.J. McCormack | J.J. McCormack | J. J. McCormack | 0 | Seán Donnelly | J. J. McCormack |
| 1952 | 0 | Tom Lavin | 0 | 0 | Seán Donnelly | Mick Cahill |
| 1953 | Mick Cahill | Frank Baird | 0 | 0 | Frank Baird | Frank Baird |
| 1954 | 0 | Freddie O'Sullivan | Séamus O'Reilly | 0 | Freddie O'Sullivan (NCA); Leo Feeney (CRE/NICF) | 0 |
| 1955 | Mick Carr (NCA) | 0 | Eddie Murphy (NCA) | 0 | Séamus O'Reilly (NCA); Jim Darragh (CRE/NICF) | Mick Cahill (NCA) |
| 1956 | Frank O'Sullivan (NCA) | Mick Cahill (NCA) | 0 | 0 | Frank O'Sullivan (NCA); Jim Darragh (CRE/NICF) | Séamus O'Reilly (NCA) |
| 1957 | Frank O'Sullivan (NCA) | Gene Mangan (NCA) | 0 | 0 | Frank O'Sullivan (NCA); Leo Feeney (CRE/NICF) | Séamus O'Reilly (NCA) |
| 1958 | P. J. Healy (NCA) | Gene Mangan (NCA) | 0 | 0 | H. Smith (NICF/CRE) | 0 |
| 1959 | Mick Palmer | Nicky McArdle | | | Martin McKay (NICF/CRE); Frank O'Sullivan | |
| 1960 | | Shay O'Hanlon (NCA) | | | Dermot Byrne (NCA) | |
| 1961 | Johnny Heery (CRÉ/NICF), Dermot Byrne (NCA) | Jack Murphy (NCA) | Frank O'Sullivan (NCA) | Frank O'Sullivan (NCA) | Frank O'Sullivan (NCA); P. Duffy (CRE/NICF) | |
| 1962 | Paddy Hennelly (NCA); J. Johnston(NICF/CRE) | | | | Frank O'Sullivan(NCA); Gerry Kinsella (CRE/NICF) | |
| 1963 | | Dan Ahearne | | | Gerry Kinsella (CRE/NICF) | |
| 1964 | | | | | Gerry Kinsella (CRE/NICF) | |
| 1965 | Seán Noonan (NCA) | | | | Frank O'Sullivan(NCA); Séamus Herron (NICF/CRE) | |
| 1966 | Mick Finnegan (NCA) | Paddy Flanagan (NCA) | | | | |
| 1967 | | | | | Hughie Davis (ICF/NICF) | |
| 1968 | Liam Horner (CRE/NICF) | Shay O'Hanlon (NCA) | | | Frank O'Sullivan (NCA); Noel McMannon (McMennamin?) (CRE/NICF) | |
| 1969 | Christy Reynolds (NCA) | | | | Christy Reynolds (NCA) | |
| 1970 | Frank O'Sullivan (ICF/NICF) | | | | Hughie Davis (ICF/NICF) | |
| 1971 | W. Baggott (ICF/NICF) | | | | Eddie Dunne (ICF/NICF) | |
| 1972 | P. Greene (CRE/NICF) | | | | Hughie Davis (CRE/NICF) | |
| 1973 | Hughie Davis (ICF/NICF) | | | | | |
| 1974 | | Jim Keogh (NCA) | Jim Keogh (NCA) | | Mick Cahill | |
| 1975 | | | | | Noel Clarke(NCA) | |
| 1976 | | | | | | |
| 1977 | | | | | Gene Mangan (NCA) | |
| 1978 | | | Christy Reynolds (NCA) | Christy Reynolds (NCA) | | |
| 1979 | Shay O'Hanlon (NICF/ICF) | | | | | |
| 1984 | | | Anthony O'Gorman | | | |

=== 3,000m; 5,000m; 6,000m; 7,000m; 8,000m; 10,000m ===
| Year | 3,000m | 5,000m | 6,000m | 7,000m | 8,000m | 10,000m |
| 1922 | | Bertie Donnelly | | | | |
| 1938 | 0 | 0 | 0 | 0 | 0 | Frank Baird |
| 1939 | 0 | 0 | 0 | 0 | 0 | 0 |
| 1940 | 0 | 0 | 0 | 0 | 0 | 0 |
| 1941 | 0 | Mick Mannion | 0 | 0 | 0 | 0 |
| 1942 | Seán Donnelly | Mick Anderson | Vinny Lyons | 0 | 0 | Mick Mannion |
| 1943 | 0 | Mick Anderson | Seán Donnelly | Mick Anderson | 0 | J. Garvin |
| 1944 | Seán Donnelly | Seán Donnelly | Seán Donnelly | Mick Anderson | E. Meagher | Seán Donnelly |
| 1945 | Vinny Lyons | Frank Baird | Seán Donnelly | J. J. Foley | E. Meagher | Mick Anderson |
| 1946 | 0 | Frank Baird | 0 | Frank Baird | Cecil O'Reilly | Frank Baird |
| 1947 | Jim McQuaid | Vinny Lyons | Vinny Lyons | J. J. McCormack | 0 | Vinny Lyons |
| 1948 | Vinny Lyons | Vinny Lyons | 0 | 0 | Vinny Lyons | 0 |
| 1949 | J. J. McCormack | J.J. McCormack | J. Garvin | Frank Baird | 0 | 0 |
| 1950 | J. J. McCormack | Jimmy Mannion | Mick Cahill | Mick Cahill | Tom Lavin | Mick Cahill |
| 1951 | 0 | Mick Cahill | 0 | 0 | 0 | Frank O'Sullivan |
| 1952 | Mick Cahill | Jimmy Mannion | 0 | 0 | 0 | Jimmy Mannion |
| 1953 | 0 | Frank Baird | 0 | Frank Baird | 0 | Mick Palmer |
| 1954 | Mick Cahill | Freddie O'Sullivan | 0 | 0 | 0 | Mick Cahill |
| 1955 | Mick Cahill | Freddie O'Sullivan | | Frank Leahy | 0 | Séamus O'Reilly |
| 1956 | Frank O'Sullivan | Séamus O'Reilly | 0 | 0 | 0 | 0 |
| 1957 | Frank O'Sullivan | Nicky McArdle | 0 | 0 | 0 | Paddy Mannion |
| – | | | | | | |
| 1961 | | Shay O'Hanlon | | | | |
| 1969 | | Christy Reynolds (NCA) | | | | |
| 1973 | | Paddy Flanagan | | | | |
| 1974 | Jack Murphy | Jim Keogh | | | | |
| 1978 | | Christy Reynolds (NCA) | | | | |

=== 10,000m Pt. to Pt.; 3/4ml; 6ml; 4,000m; 8ml; ===
1962 5,000m point to point: Dan Ahearne

| Year | 10,000m Pt to Pt | .75ml | 6ml | 4,000m | 9,000m | 8ml. |
| 1911 | | | M. J. Byrne (GAA) | | | |
| 1912 | | | | | | W. A. Campbell (GAA) |
| 1919 | | | W. A. Campbell (GAA) | | | |
| 1923 | | | Bertie Donnelly | | | J. J. Barnes |
| 1935 | Alo Donegan | | | | | |
| 1938 | Frank Baird | 0 | 0 | 0 | 0 | 0 |
| 1939 | Mick Anderson (NACA); Des Troy (CRE) | 0 | 0 | 0 | 0 | 0 |
| 1940 | W. G. Robinson | 0 | 0 | 0 | 0 | 0 |
| 1941 | Frank Baird | 0 | 0 | 0 | 0 | 0 |
| 1942 | Mick Anderson | 0 | 0 | Seán Donnelly | 0 | 0 |
| 1943 | Mick Anderson | 0 | 0 | 0 | 0 | 0 |
| 1944 | Mick Anderson | 0 | 0 | 0 | 0 | 0 |
| 1945 | M. Milner | Seán Donnelly | 0 | 0 | 0 | 0 |
| 1946 | Mick Anderson | Vinny Lyons | 0 | 0 | 0 | 0 |
| 1947 | Dick Walsh | Dick Walsh | 0 | 0 | 0 | 0 |
| 1948 | Cecil McIvor | 0 | 0 | 0 | 0 | 0 |
| 1949 | J. J. McCormack | 0 | Willie O'Brien | Frank Baird | 0 | 0 |
| 1950 | J. J. McCormack | 0 | 0 | J. J. McCormack | 0 | 0 |
| 1951 | J. J. McCormack | 0 | 0 | 0 | 0 | 0 |
| 1952 | Mick Cahill | 0 | 0 | 0 | G. Duggan | 0 |
| 1953 | Freddie O'Sullivan | 0 | 0 | 0 | 0 | 0 |
| 1954 | Frank Baird | 0 | 0 | 0 | 0 | 0 |
| 1955 | Mick Cahill | 0 | 0 | 0 | 0 | 0 |
| 1956 | Nicky McArdle | 0 | 0 | 0 | 0 | 0 |
| 1957 | Nicky McArdle | 0 | 0 | 0 | 0 | 0 |
| 1958 | Gene Mangan | 0 | 0 | 0 | 0 | 0 |
| 1959 | Matt Hoey | 0 | 0 | 0 | 0 | 0 |
| 1960 | Ollie O'Shaughnessy | 0 | 0 | 0 | 0 | 0 |
| 1961 | Jack Murphy | 0 | 0 | 0 | 0 | 0 |
| 1962 | Mick Twomey | | | | | |
| 1965 | Shay O'Hanlon | | | | | |
| 1969 | Christy Reynolds | 0 | 0 | 0 | 0 | 0 |
| 1970 | Kevin Dolan | 0 | 0 | 0 | 0 | 0 |
| 1971 | Jack Murphy | 0 | 0 | 0 | 0 | 0 |
| 1974 | Jack Murphy | 0 | 0 | 0 | 0 | 0 |
| 1975 | Liam Keegan (NCA) | | | | | |

=== Sprint; 1km TT; Pursuit; Points ===
| Year | Sprint | 1 km TT | Pursuit | Points |
| 1930 | Herbie Breadon | | | |
| 1931 | | Bertie Donnelly | | |
| 1932 | | Bertie Donnelly | | |
| 1933 | | Bertie Donnelly | | |
| 1934 | | Alo Donegan | | |
| 19 | | | | |
| 1937 | | J. O'Callaghan (CRE) | | |
| 1938 | | Alo Donegan (CRE) | | |
| 1939 | | F. Duff (CRE) | | |
| 19 | | | | |
| 19 | | | | |
| 1966 | | Gene Mangan | Kevin Dolan (NCA) | |
| 1967 | Hughie Davis (CRE/NICF) | | | |
| 1969 | Mike O'Donaghue (NCA) | Gene Mangan | Christy Reynolds (NCA) | |
| 1970 | | Paddy Wall | Shay O'Hanlon (NCA) | |
| 1971 | Paddy Doran | | Shay O'Hanlon (NCA) | |
| 1972 | Larry Clarke | Hughie Davis (ICF/CRE); Shay O'Hanlon (NCA) | Shay O'Hanlon (NCA) | |
| 1973 | Noel Clarke | Hughie Davis (ICF/CRE); Larry Clarke (NCA) | Shay O'Hanlon (NCA) | |
| 1974 | Gene Mangan | Mikie O'Donaghue or Larry Clarke (NCA) | Michael Nulty | |
| 1975 | Larry Clarke (NCA) | Larry Clarke (NCA) | Shay O'Hanlon (NCA) | |
| 1976 | Séamus Kennedy | Shay O'Hanlon (NCA) | Shay O'Hanlon (NCA) | |
| 1977 | Noel Clarke | Denis Devin (NCA) | Eamonn Connolly (NCA) | |
| 1978 | Larry Clarke | Shay O'Hanlon (NCA) | | |
| 1979 | | | Shay O'Hanlon | |
| 1980 | | | | |
| 1981 | | | | |
| 1982 | | | Garry Thompson | |
| 1984 | A. Mooney | Pat Shearer | Stephen Spratt | |
| 1985 | Aidan Ryan | Aidan Ryan | Stephen McNally | |
| 1989 | Aidan Ryan | Declan Lonergan | Declan Lonergan | Paul Doyle |
| 1990 | Declan Byrne | Declan Lonergan | Declan Lonergan | Stephen Spratt |
| 1991 | Paul Giles | Declan Lonergan | Declan Lonergan | Philip Collins |
| 1992 | Paul Giles | Paul Doyle | Philip Collins | Paul Doyle |
| 1993 | Paul Giles | Philip Collins | Philip Collins | Philip Collins |
| 1994 | Julian Dalby | David Peelo | Philip Collins | Philip Collins |
| 1995 | | | | Paul Giles |
| 1996 | | Paul Doyle | | Tommy Evans |
| 1997 | Keith Bannon | David Peelo | Simon Coughlan | David Peelo |
| 1998 | | | | |
| 1999 | | | | |
| 2001 | Keith Bannon | Paul Doyle | | Paul Healion |
| 2003 | Keith Bannon | Paul Doyle | Ray Clarke | Ray Clarke |
| 2004 | Peter Dunne | Paul Doyle | Paul Healion | |
| 2005 | Keith Bannon | Paul Doyle | Ray Clarke | Ray Clarke |
| 2006 | Kieran Leahy | Paul Healion | Paul Healion | |
| 2007 | Kieran Leahy | Paul Doyle | Brian Conway | |
| 2008 | Michael Mulcahy | Stephen Barrett | Paul Healion | |
| 2009 | Michael Mulcahy | Stephen Barrett | Simon Coughlan | |
| 2010 | Jason Howick | Martyn Irvine | Martyn Irvine | |
| 2011 | Donal Bailey | Martyn Irvine | Martyn Irvine | |
| 2012 | Eoin Mullen | Eoin Mullen | Hugh Mulhearne | |
| 2013 | Eoin Mullen | Terry Mackin | Martyn Irvine | |

=== Junior: 1,000m; 1 mile; 5,000m; 5 miles; Others ===
| Year | 1,000m | 1 mile | 5,000m | 5 miles | Others |
| 1934 | T. B. Fortune (youths) | | | | |
| 1936 | Frank Baird (youths) | | | | |
1938 William Scott (Connaught Junior Champion)
| 1941 | C. O'Reilly | | | | |
| 1944 | T. J. Dunne | | | | |
| 1950 | Kerry Sloane | Jim Moran | | | |
| 1951 | P. Walshe | | | | |
| 1952 | Mick Palmer | Paddy Mannion | | | |
| 1953 | | J. O'Sullivan | J. Jackson | John Casburn | Cecil O'Reilly (2 km); F. Twomey (3ml); V. Lyng (4ml); |
| 1954 | Séamus O'Reilly | H. Casey | L. Lafferty | F. Healy | T. Madden (2ml); F. O'Sullivan (3ml); Joe O'Brien (4ml); J. Mohan (10 km) |
| 1955 | | Mick Finnegan | T. Forde (3ml) | | F. Leally (2ml); Gerry Rea (2 km); Nicky McArdle (3 km) |
| 1956 | | M. Poulson | M. Costello | C. Tracy | T. Fogarty (1/2ml) |
| 1957 | Mick Slattery | P. Quinn | J. Murphy | P. Walshe | S. Ryan (1/2ml) |
| 1958 | P. O'Gorman | M. Burke | Willie Hasley | P. Healy | S. Keane (10 km) |
| 1959 | | M. O'Leary | | Dermot Byrne | Ollie Shaughnessy(2ml);Jack Murphy/Kevin Dolan (3ml); Pat Doyle (4ml); P Hennelly (7 km); P. J. Doyle (8 km) |
| 1966 | | | Christy Reynolds | | |
| 1967 | | | John McCann | | |

== Mountain bike ==
=== Elite/Senior Cross Country (XC) & Downhill (DH) ===
| Year | Men – XC | Women – XC | Men – DH | Women – DH |
| 1994 | Robin Seymour | Jenny Brennan | | |
| 1995 | Robin Seymour | Tarja Owens | Paul Gilsenan | |
| 1996 | Robin Seymour | Tarja Owens | Robin Seymour | |
| 1997 | Robin Seymour | Tarja Owens | David O'Hara | |
| 1998 | Robin Seymour | Tarja Owens | John Lawlor | Donna Lyons |
| 1999 | Robin Seymour | Tarja Owens | Andrew Yoong | |
| 2000 | Robin Seymour | Tarja Owens | John Lawlor | |
| 2001 | Robin Seymour | Tarja Owens | John Lawlor | Tarja Owens |
| 2002 | Robin Seymour | Tarja Owens | Glyn O'Brien | Michelle McCarthy |
| 2003 | Robin Seymour | Tarja Owens | Colin Ross | Michelle McCarthy |
| 2004 | Robin Seymour | Tarja Owens | Ben Reid | Michelle McCarthy |
| 2005 | Robin Seymour | Tarja Owens | Ben Reid | Michelle McCartney |
| 2006 | Robin Seymour | Tarja Owens | Ben Reid | Maeve Baxter |
| 2007 | Robin Seymour | Beth McCluskey | Ben Reid | Maeve Baxter |
| 2008 | Robin Seymour | Caitlin Elliott | Colin Ross (2) | Maeve Baxter |
| 2009 | Connor McConvey | Beth McCluskey | Ben Reid | Maeve Baxter |
| 2010 | Robin Seymour | Caitlin Elliott | Daniel Wolfe | Michelle McMullan |
| 2011 | Robin Seymour | Caitlin Elliott | Gerard Wolfe | Silvia Gallagher |
| 2012 | Robin Seymour | Melanie Späth | Ewan Doherty | |
| 2013 | Robin Seymour (19) | Ciara MacManus | Colin Ross (3) | Silvia Gallagher |
| 2014 | Robin Seymour (20) | Ciara MacManus (2) | Colin Ross (4) | Tara O’Boyle |
| 2015 | Gareth McKee | Ciara MacManus (3) | Colin Ross (5) | Sasha Bickerstaff |
| 2016 | Gareth McKee (2) | Ciara MacManus (4) | | |
| 2017 | Gareth McKee (3) | Ciara MacManus (5) | | |
| 2018 | Gareth McKee (4) | Ciara MacManus (6) | | |
| 2019 | David Conroy | Niamh McKiverigan | | |
| 2020 | David Conroy (2) | No race due to COVID | | |
| 2021 | David Montgomery | Ciara MacManus (7) | | |
| 2022 | Christopher McGlinchey | Caoimhe May | Ronan Dunne | Meghan Flanagan |
| 2023 | Christopher Dawson | Caoimhe May (2) | Greg Callaghan | Meghan Flanagan |
| 2024 | Christopher Dawson (2) | Greta Lawless | Oisin O’Callaghan | Leah Maunsell |

=== Junior Cross Country (XC) & Downhill (DH) ===
| Year | Men – XC | Men – DH | Women – DH | Marathon XC |
| 1994 | Gordon Byrne | | | |
| 1995 | Sean Herlihy | | | |
| 1996 | Matt Dempsey | John Lawlor | | |
| 1997 | James O'Carroll | John Lawlor | | |
| 1998 | Matthew Slattery | | Donna Lyons | |
| 1999 | Patrick Egan | Colin Ross | | |
| 2000 | Ollie Gray | Colin Ross | | |
| 2001 | Glen Kinning | Colin Ross | | |
| 2002 | Lewis Ferguson | Ben Reid | | |
| 2003 | Lewis Ferguson | Ben Reid | | |
| 2004 | Matthew Ferguson | Greg O'Keeffe | | |
| 2005 | Andrew McCullough | Dan Wolfe | | |
| 2006 | Conor McConvey | | | Conor McConvey |
| 2007 | Liam McGreevy | | | |
| 2008 | | | | |
| 2009 | Jonny Beers | Greg Callaghan | | |
| 2010 | Matthew Adair | Christopher McGlinchey | Brendan Cassidy | |
| 2011 | Gavin Carroll | Gavin Carroll | | |
| 2012 | David Montgomery | Christopher McGlinchey | Miriam Haskins | |
| 2013 | David Montgomery | Stephen McCormack | | |
| 2014 | James Curry | Jacob Dickson | Sacha Bickerstaff | |
| 2015 | James Curry | Jacob Dickson | | |
| 2021 | Dean Harvey | | | |

=== Veterans & Masters ===
| Year | Veteran – XC | Master – XC | Veterans – DH | Master – DH |
| 1994 | Denis Brennan | | | |
| 1995 | Alan Cranston | | | |
| 1996 | Alan Cranston | | | |
| 1997 | Knud Jensen | | Ian Graham | |
| 1998 | Knud Jensen | Aiden McDonald | Thomas Clogher | Paul McMenamin |
| 1999 | Knud Jensen | Michael Jordan | Thomas Clogher | Andy Laverty |
| 2000 | Knud Jensen | Robert Lamont | Peter Popham | Mark Dickson |
| 2001 | Knud Jensen | Peter McConville | Peter Popham | Joseph Ward |
| 2002 | Knud Jensen | Peter McConville | Peter Popham | Philip McIntosh |
| 2003 | Peter Buggle | David King-Smith | Derek Cowan | Marty McGuigan |
| 2004 | Robert Lamont | Peter McConville | Peter Popham | Mark Dickson |
| 2005 | Robert Lamont | Simon O'Loughlin | Dave McManus | Marty McGuigan |
| 2006 | Robert Lamont | Joe McCall | Carl Young | Marty McGuigan |
| 2007 | Gerry McCabe | Joe McCall | Steve Bell | Michael Cowan |
| 2008 | Peter Buggle | James McCluskey | Carl Young | Glyn O'Brien |
| 2009 | Peter Buggle | James McCluskey | Carl Young | Andy Yoong |
| 2010 | Aidan McDonald | James McCluskey | Ian McIntyre | Mark Kieren |
| 2011 | Vinnie Fitzsimon | Kevin Stanley | Joseph Jackman | Dale McMullan |
| 2012 | | | Ian McIntyre | Damien Daly |
| 2013 | Vinnie Fitzsimon | Barry Kellett | Ian McIntyre | Damien Daly |
| 2014 | | | Ian McIntyre | Glyn O’Brien |
| 2015 | | | Ian McIntyre | Glyn O'Brien |
| 2021 | M30 – Richard Maes M40 – Glyn O'Brien M50 – Robin Seymour | | | |

=== Expert & Sport & U23 ===
| Year | Expert – XC | Sport – XC | U23 – XC | Sport – DH |
| 1998 | Anthony Doyle | Shane Connaughton | | Paul McCarthy |
| 1999 | Tom Greene | Anton Cartwright | | Shane Connaughton |
| 2000 | Dessie Foley | Patrick Loughman | | Conor Campbell |
| 2001 | | | Colin Leahy | |
| 2002 | | | Glen Kinning | |

=== Marathon XC ===
| Year | Senior Men | Senior Women | Expert Men | Masters Men | Veteran Men | |
| 2005 | Robin Seymour | Jenny McCauley | | | | |
| 2006 | Robin Seymour | Tarja Owens | Vav Halik | Joe McCall | | – |
| 2010 | Ryan Sherlock | Caitlin Elliott | | Richie Close | Robert Lamont | |
| 2011 | Ryan Sherlock | Ciara McManus | | James McCluskey | | |
| 2012 | Richard Felle | | | | | |
| | Gerry McCabe | | | | | |
| 2014 | Ryan Sherlock | Ciara MacManus | | | | |
| 2015 | Gareth McKee | Melanie Späth | | | | |
| 2016 | | | | | | |
| 2017 | Gareth McKee | Maeve Morrogh | | | | |
| 2018 | - | - | - | - | - | |

== Hill Climb ==
=== Elite/Senior Men ===
| Year | Gold | Silver | Bronze |
| 1998 | Paul Griffin | | |
| 2001 | Paul Griffin (2) | | |
| 2002 | Gareth Rogers | | |
| 2003 | Gareth Rogers (2) | | |
| 2004 | Paul Griffin (3) | | |
| 2005 | Roger Aiken | Ronan McLaughin | Paul Brady |
| 2006 | Paul Griffin (4) | | |
| 2007 | David McCann | | |
| 2008 | Ronan McLaughlin | | |
| 2009 | Paul Griffin (5) | Mark Dowling | Ryan Sherlock |
| 2010 | Ryan Sherlock | Paul Griffin | |
| 2011 | Mark Dowling | Ryan Sherlock | Damien Shaw |
| 2012 | Ryan Sherlock (2) | Anthony Walsh | Greg Swinand |
| 2013 | Mark Dowling (2) | Ryan Sherlock | Danny Bruton |
| 2014 | no race | | |
| 2015 | Denis Dunworth | John Lee | Cian Sutcliffe |
| 2016 | Mark Dowling (3) | Lindsay Watson | Conor Kissane |
| 2017 | Darnell Moore | Lindsay Watson | Conor Kissane |
| 2018 | Darnell Moore (2) | Conor Kissane | Chris McGlinchey |
| 2019 | Mark Dowling (4) | Conor Kissane | James Davenport |
| 2021 | Joel Luke | Lyndsay Watson | Conor Kissane |
| 2022 | Darren Rafferty | Gareth O'Neill | Conor Kissane |
| 2023 | Conn McDunphy | Conor Kissane | Gareth O'Neill |

=== Elite/Senior Women ===
| Year | Gold | Silver | Bronze |
| 2022 | Linda Kelly | Hazel Smith | Lauren Garvey |
| 2023 | Sophie Daly | Niamh O'Dwyer | Lisa Stapelbroek |

== Criterium ==
=== Elite/Senior Men ===
| Year | Location | Gold | Silver | Bronze |
| 2000 | Midleton | Paul Healion | Eugene Moriarty | Ciarán Power |
| 2001 | | | | |
| 2002 | Lurgan | Paul Doyle | Stephen O'Sullivan | |
| 2003 | Cork | Stephen O'Sullivan | Timmy Barry | Paul Griffin |
| 2004 | Belfast | Willie Hamilton | Aaron Deane | Paul Healion |
| 2005 | Cork | Eugene Moriarty | Conor Murphy | Paddy Moriarty |
| 2006 | Westport | David O'Loughlin | | |
| 2007 | Killarney | Ciarán Power | Brian Kenneally | Aidan Crowley |
| 2008 | Ormeau Park | Peter Hawkins | Stephen O'Sullivan | K.Sloan |
| 2009 | Dundrum | Paul Healion (2) | Simon Williams | Martyn Irvine |
| 2010 | Dundalk | Martyn Irvine | Michael Redden | Stephen O'Sullivan |
| 2011 | Mullingar | Martyn Irvine (2) | Damien Shaw | Stephen O'Sullivan |
| 2012 | Mullingar | Felix English | Damien Shaw | Páidi O'Brien |
| 2013 | Cork | Paídi O'Brien | Martyn Irvine | Mark Dowling |
| 2014 | Mondello Park | Peter Hawkins | Damien Shaw | Paul Kennedy |
| 2015 | Claremorris | Mark Dowling | Paídi O'Brien | Connor Hennebry |
| 2016 | Banbridge | Mark Dowling (2) | Philip Lavery | Gareth McKee |
| 2017 | Greenmount, County Limerick | Marc Potts | Paul Kennedy | James Davenport |
| 2018 | Mullingar | Dillon Corkery | Damian Shaw | Darnell Moore |
| 2019 | Tynagh | Fintan Ryan | Luke Smith | Darnell Moore |
| 2020 | Tynagh | Andy Maguire | Darnell Moore | Leo Doyle |
| 2021 | Limerick | Conor Murnane | Daire Feeley | Lorcan Daly |
| 2022 | Kells | John Buller | Luke Smith | Paul-Antoine Hagan |
| 2023 | Mondello | John Buller (2) | Conor Murnane | Leo Doyle |
| 2024 | Banbridge | Darnell Moore | John Buller | Luke Smith |

=== Elite/Senior Women ===
| Year | Location | Gold | Silver | Bronze |
| 2017* | Limerick | Fiona Guihan | Mia Griffin | Laura Shannon |
| 2018* | Mullingar | Fiona Guihan | Jennifer Bates | Lyndsey Bryce |
| 2019 | Loughrea | Ellen McDermott | Lauren Creamer | Shannon McCurley |
| 2020 | Loughrea | Grace Young | Lara Gillespie | Eve McCrystal |
| 2021 | Limerick | Autumn Collins | Aoife O’Brien | Caoimhe O’Brien |
| 2022 | Kells | Megan Armitage | Cleo Harvey | Aoife O’Brien |
| 2023 | Mondello | Mia Griffin | Marine Lenehan | Eve McCrystal |
| 2024 | Banbridge | Marine Lenehan | Annalise Murphy | Aine Doherty |

(* Demo Event)

== Cyclo-Cross ==
=== Elite/Senior Men ===
| Year | Location | Gold | Silver | Bronze |
| 1972 | | Noel McGuill | | |
| 1973 | | Jack Murphy | | |
| 1979 | | Stephen Roche | | |
| 1981 | | Alastair Irvine | Gerald Irvine | Raphael Kimmage |
| 1988 | | | | Julian Dalby |
| 1991 | Rostrevor | Joe Barr | Julian Dalby | |
| 1992–1996 | | Robin Seymour (5 straight wins) | | |
| 1997 | | Robin Seymour (6) | Craig Brady | Aiden McDonald |
| 1998–2004 | | Robin Seymour (7 straight wins) | | |
| 2005 | | Roger Aiken | | |
| 2006 | | Robin Seymour (14) | | |
| 2007 | | Robin Seymour (15) | | |
| 2008 | | Roger Aiken (2) | | |
| 2009 | St Anne's Park, Raheny, Dublin 5 | Joe McCall | Ryan Sherlock | Liam McGreevy |
| 2010 | Djouce Woods, Co.Wicklow | Robin Seymour (16) | Ryan Sherlock | |
| 2011 (9.8ml) | Lurgan Park, County Armagh | Robin Seymour (17) | Evan Ryan | Connor Campbell |
| 2012 | St. Anne's Park, Raheny, Dublin 5 | Robin Seymour (18) | Roger Aiken | Matthew Adair |
| 2013 | Muirhevnamor Park, Dundalk | Roger Aiken (3) | Robin Seymour | Connor McConvey |
| 2014 | Lady Dixon Park, Belfast | Roger Aiken (4) | Robin Seymour | Glenn Kinning |
| 2015 | Swords, Co.Dublin | David Montgomery | Timmy O'Regan | Glenn Kinning |
| 2016 | Tollymore Forest Park, Co.Down | Roger Aiken (5) | David Montgomery | Glenn Kinning |
| 2017 | Tollymore Forest Park, Co.Down | Roger Aiken (6) | Glenn Kinning | Christopher McGlinchey |
| 2018 | Glencullen Adventure Park, Co.Wicklow | Darnell Moore | David Conroy | Graham Boyd |
| 2019 | Fota Island, Co.Cork | David Conroy | David Montgomery | Darnell Moore |
| 2020 | Enniscrone, Co.Sligo | David Conroy | Christopher McGlinchey | Thomas Creighton |
| 2022 | Armagh, Co.Armagh | Christopher McGlinchey | Seán Nolan | Darnell Moore |
| 2023 | Jenkinstown, Co.Louth | Dean Harvey | Christopher Dawson | Darren Rafferty |
| 2024 | Limerick, Co.Munster | Dean Harvey | Kevin McCambridge | Darnell Moore |
| 2025 | Ballinasloe, Co.Connaught | Dean Harvey | Darnell Moore | Travis Harkness |

=== Elite/Senior Women ===
| Year | Location | Gold | Silver | Bronze |
| 2013 | Muirhevnamor Park, Dundalk | Francine Meehan | Melanie Späth | Susie Mitchell |
| 2014 | Lady Dixon Park, Belfast | Francine Meehan (2) | Melanie Späth | Maeve O'Grady |
| 2015 | Swords, County Dublin | Francine Meehan (3) | Maria Larkin | Claire Oakley |
| 2016 | Tollymore Forest Park, County Down | Beth McCluskey | Maeve O'Grady | Maria Larkin |
| 2017 | Tollymore Forest Park, County Down | Beth McCluskey (2) | Maria Larkin | Fiona Meade |
| 2018 | Glencullen Adventure Park, County Wicklow | Lara Gillespie | Michelle Geoghegan | Maeve Morrogh |
| 2019 | Fota Island, County Cork | Lara Gillespie (2) | Maria Larkin | Lucy O’Donnell |
| 2020 | Enniscrone, County Sligo | Maria Larkin | Michelle Geoghegan | Lucy O’Donnell |
| 2022 | Armagh, County Armagh | Maria Larkin (2) | Darcey Harkness | Roisin Lally |
| 2023 | Jenkinstown, County Louth | Maria Larkin (3) | Hannah McClorey | Stephanie Roche |

== Notes ==
The Irish National Cycling Championships are annual cycling races to decide the Irish cycling champion for several disciplines, across several categories of rider. Through the years there have been new championships added and older championships dropped as social and sporting attitudes changed.

=== Track ===
Up to the late 1960s the distances for track championships were affected by economic factors. Combined athletic and cycling meetings were held in every part of the country and attracted large attendances; the outstanding cyclists of the day were household names. This led to the organisers of meetings demanding a championship (county, provincial or national) to attract bigger gates. The number of championships was increased to meet this demand and this has created difficulties in compiling these lists because one cannot be sure that the absence of a result for an event is due to lack of research or the fact that the event did not take place in a particular year. There were, of course, core distances that were regularly raced for many years. No matter what the motive for putting them on the calendar these championships were keenly contested and the winners are due as much respect as those who won the events that have persisted through the years.

Championships were raced on a mixture of hard surfaces and on grass depending on where they were held. Championships were not designated as grass track or hard track but rather as distances.

After the late 1960s the "local" began to die in Ireland. Sports meetings faded out with showbands. People became less interested in going down the road to see local heroes when they could sit at home and look into the pores of the best competitors in the world on television. This brought a contraction in the number of track championships back to the core distances and disciplines.

=== Road ===
Road racing was less affected by economics and fashion. Time trials have been a feature since the earliest days. It should be remembered that time trials became so popular in the United Kingdom because cycle racing on the open road was illegal. Riders wore sports jackets and tights as part of the strategy to avoid detection and prosecution. Once independence was achieved in part of Ireland time trialling escaped from these stifling rules and gradually massed start road racing became popular and championships were held.

The classic time trial distances were 25, 50 and 100 miles and 12 and 24 hours. From the early 1960s the longer events faded away. Although the 25 miles remained on the books there was sometimes a slight variation in the distance and out and home courses were not always used.

Massed start championships for men were initially held at more than one distance each year but by the early 1960s settled into one event of at least 100 miles/160 km.

=== Categories ===
Racing as recorded in Ireland was almost completely amateur and no professional stand-alone championships were ever held. When the Olympic Games abandoned the amateur ruling, cycling internationally adopted a system of over 23 Elite and under 23 with no distinction between amateurs and professionals.

==== Junior racing ====
The term "Junior" has had many meanings. At one time the gradings were Novice (who had not won 3 prizes), Junior (who had won 3 prizes) and Senior (who had gained a place in the first three in a Senior championship). Later "Junior" meant under 18 on a particular date. There were occasional "Youths" championships which at one time meant under 20 years on a specified date but this may not have been consistent.

==== Women's racing ====
Women's racing goes back to at least the 1930s but only a small number of championships are recorded before the 1980s.

=== Organisations ===
At various times there was more than one body organising cycling in Ireland and each promoted their own championship. These are all regarded as being of equal merit in this listing.

The overlaps are:

- 1900s,10s and 20s :Irish Cycling Association (ICA) <> Gaelic Athletic Association (GAA);
- 1936 to 1940: National Athletic & Cycling Association (NACA) <> Cumann Rothuideachta na hÉireann (CRE);
- 1950 to 1967:Cumann Rothuideachta na hÉireann (CRE) & Northern Ireland Cycling Federation (NICF) <> National Cycling Association of Ireland (NCA);
- 1967 to 1979: Irish Cycling Federation (ICF) & NICF <> NCA

== Other external sources ==
Information not referenced above was gleaned from:

- NCA 21st Birthday Book published by Kerry Sloane which listed NCA championships between 1938 and 1959.
- 1978 NCA Racing Calendar which repeated some of the above list and brought it up to that date with some anomalies.
- NICF Year Books between 1950 and 1975, with some gaps, provided by Jack Watson and examined by Rory Wyley.
- Cycling Ireland Year Books 1988 to 2012, examined by Rory Wyley.
- The Cyclist and The Irish Cyclist volumes from 1934 to 1940 in the National Library of Ireland.
- The Irish Cyclist files in the archives of the Royal Irish Automobile Club in the care of Bob Montgomery: November 1890 – May 1891, June–October 1891, Jan–March 1898, April–June 1898, 1898–1899, July–December 1906, July–December 1908, The Wheelman 1902
- Major input from Cyril Smyth, chairman, Dublin University Central Athletic Club.
- Dundalk A Cycling History by Kevin Dolan; no ISBN
