= Sam Kerr (disambiguation) =

Sam Kerr (born 1993) is an Australian soccer player.

Sam Kerr may also refer to:

- Sam Kerr (cyclist) (born c. 1937), Northern Irish cyclist
- Sam Kerr (footballer, born 1999), Scottish footballer
