= Olivia Dillon =

Irish cyclist

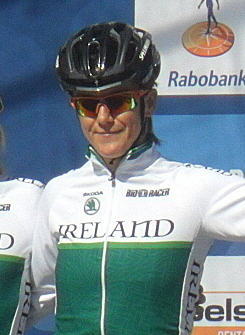
- Dillon at the 2012 UCI Road World Championships

Personal information
- Born: 4 May 1973 (age 53)

Cycling career
- Sport: Cycling
- Current team: Retired
- Discipline: Road
- Role: Rider

Amateur teams
- 2008–2009: Touchstone Climbing
- 2010: Specialized D4W / Bicycle Haus Cycling Team
- 2010–2011: Twenty12
- 2012–2013: NOW and Novartis for MS
- 2013: Breast Cancer Care Cycling Team (guest)
- 2013: Keukens Redant (guest)
- 2014: Colavita–Fine Cooking
- 2014: FCS Cycling Team (guest)
- 2015: Visit Dallas Cycling p/b Noise4Good

Olivia Dillon (born 4 May 1973) is an Irish former racing cyclist. She competed in the 2012 UCI women's road race in Valkenburg aan de Geul and in the 2013 UCI women's road race in Florence.

Dillon won her national tour, Rás na mBan, on three occasions: 2010, 2011 and 2013. She is the only rider to win the event on more than one occasion. Dillon won the Irish National Time Trial Championships on four occasions: 2008, 2009, 2010 and 2012 and she took victory in the Irish National Road Race Championships in 2010, one of five medals she won in the event.

== Personal life ==
Dillon is married to American professional cyclist Tayler Wiles.

== Major results ==
2008
1st Time trial, National Road Championships
2009
National Road Championships

1st Time trial
2nd Road race

2010
National Road Championships

1st Time trial
1st Road race

1st Overall Rás na mBan

1st Stages 1, 2 & 3 (ITT)

2011
1st Overall Rás na mBan

1st Stages 2, 3 & 4

2012
National Road Championships

1st Time trial
3rd Road race

2nd Overall Sea Otter Classic
7th Overall Tour of the Gila
2013
1st Overall Rás na mBan

1st Stage 3 (TTT)

7th Overall Tour of Elk Grove
2014
1st Stage 5 Rás na mBan
2nd Road race, National Road Championships
5th Overall Armed Forces Association Cycling Classic
9th Overall Joe Martin Stage Race
9th Overall North Star Grand Prix
2015
3rd Road race, National Road Championships
10th Overall Tulsa Tough
