= Séamus Kennedy (cyclist) =

Irish cyclist (1947–2012)

Personal information
- Nickname: Kenno
- Born: 1947 County Kerry, Ireland
- Died: 7 May 2012 (aged 64–65) Mater Private Hospital, Dublin, Ireland

Cycling career
- Sport: Cycling
- Discipline: Road bicycle racing
- Role: Rider

Amateur teams
- Navan Road Club
- Dunboyne Cycling Club

Major wins
- Rás Tailteann, 1978

Séamus Kennedy (1947 – 7 May 2012) was an Irish cyclist. He won the Rás Tailteann in 1978.

== Early life ==
Séamus Kennedy's parents were from Maharees, County Kerry. He was born in 1947.

== Career ==
Séamus Kennedy competed in the Rás Tailteann every year between 1965 and 1981, winning it in 1978. His last appearance in the competition was in 1983.

Kennedy also won the 1968 Double Diamond Trophy.

In 1969, he won the Irish National Cycling Championships ½-mile, 25-mile and 100-mile road race. In 1975 he won the 3-mile race.

== Personal and later life ==
Séamus Kennedy's home was in Kilcloon.

== Legacy ==
The Séamus Kennedy Memorial Cycle takes place each year at Dunboyne.
