= Paul Healion =

Irish cyclist (1978–2009)

Personal information
- Full name: Paul Healion
- Born: 3 June 1978 Ireland
- Died: 16 August 2009 (aged 31)
- Height: 1.87 m (6 ft 2 in)

Cycling career
- Sport: Cycling
- Disciplines: Road, Track (4k Ind. Pursuit, Team Pursuit)
- Role: Rider

Professional team
- 2005-2008: -

Major wins
- Ireland National Time Trial Champion (2000, 2008); Ireland National Criterium Champion (2001, 2009)

Paul Healion (3 June 1978 - 16 August 2009) was an Irish racing cyclist from Dunboyne, County Meath.

In 2000 and 2008 he was the National Time Trial Champion. In 2001 he won his first National Criterium Championships. He won the event again in 2009 during a spell of superb form.

Healion died on the evening of 16 August 2009 after his car, in which he was alone, crashed near Ardee, County Louth. He leaves a widow, Ann. He had been due to ride the Tour of Ireland stage race the following weekend as part of the Irish Cycling Team.

== Major results ==
1998

- 3rd, Irish National Time-trial (10 mile) Championship (CN)

2000

- 1st, Irish National Time-trial Championship (CN)

2001

- 1st, Irish National Criterium Championship (CN)

2002

- 5th, Irish National Time-trial Championship (CN)

2003

- 3rd, Irish National Time-trial Championship (CN)
- 5th, Irish National Criterium Championship (CN)

2004

- 1st, Irish National Elite Track Pursuit Championship (CN)
- 3rd, Irish National Criterium Championship (CN)
- 4th, Irish National Time-trial Championship (CN)

2005 – Driving Force Logistics

- 5th, Irish National Time-trial Championship (CN)

2006 – Team Murphy&Gunn-Newlyn

- 1st overall, Ras Mumhan
  - 1st, Stage 3a
  - 2nd, Stage 4
  - 2nd, Stage 2
- 2nd, Irish National Time-trial Championship (CN)
- 6th, Stephen Roche GP

2007 – Murphy & Gunn-Newlyn–M Donnelly–Sean Kelly Team

- 1st, Stage 4, Ras Mumhan
- 2nd, Irish National Time-trial Championship (CN)
- 2nd, Lincoln International Grand Prix
- 3rd overall, Tour of Ulster
  - 1st, Stage 3
  - 1st, Stage 4
- 4th, Irish National Time-trial Championship (CN)

2008 – Pezula Cycling Team

- 1st, Irish National Time-trial Championship (CN)
- 36th overall, FBD Insurance Rás (2.2) (riding for McNally Swords)
  - 8th, Stage 8

2009

- 1st, Irish National Criterium Championship (CN)
- 5th, Tour of Blackpool (riding for Irish National Team)
- 11th, Irish National Road Race Championship (CN)
- 43rd overall, FBD Insurance Rás (2.2) (riding for Irish National Team)
  - 1st, Stage 6
  - 4 other Top 10 stage placings
