= Geraldine Gill =

Irish racing cyclist, national champion

Personal information
- Full name: Geraldine Gill
- Born: 25 September 1975 (age 51) Ireland

Cycling career
- Sport: Cycling
- Discipline: Road
- Role: Rider

Professional teams
- 2006: EC Evel Bavok
- 2007: Labello / Lamballe
- 2008: Cycleways

Geraldine Gill (born 25 September 1975) is an Irish racing cyclist from Bohermeen. She was the Irish National Time Trial Champion in 2002 and the Road Race champion for four consecutive years from 2001 to 2003.

== Palmarès ==
2000
1st, Irish National Road Race Championships

2001
1st, Irish National Road Race Championships

2002
1st, Irish National Time Trial Championships
1st, Irish National Road Race Championships

2003
1st, Irish National Road Race Championships

2010
9th, Irish National Road Race Championships
