= Susan O'Mara =

Irish racing cyclist, national champion

Personal information
- Full name: Susan O'Mara
- Born: 26 February 1965 (age 61) Ireland

Cycling career
- Sport: Cycling
- Discipline: Road
- Role: Rider

Amateur team
- Dublin Wheelers

Professional team
- Letchworth Extran

Major wins
- Irish National Cycling Championships 1998

Susan O'Mara (born 26 February 1965) is an Irish racing cyclist from Dublin. She was the elite Irish National Champion in 1998 and the amateur champion in 1991 and 1993.

== Palmarès ==
1991
1st, Irish National Road Race Championships (amateur)

1993
1st, Irish National Road Race Championships (amateur)

1994
2nd, Irish National Road Race Championships (amateur)

1998
1st, Irish National Road Race Championships

1999
3rd, Irish National Time Trial Championships
3rd, Irish National Road Race Championships

2000
2nd, Irish National Road Race Championships

2001
1st, Irish National Time Trial Championships
2nd, Irish National Road Race Championships

2001
3rd, Irish National Time Trial Championships
