= Philip Lavery =

Irish professional racing cyclist

Personal information
- Full name: Philip Lavery
- Born: 17 August 1990 (age 36) Dublin, Ireland

Cycling career
- Sport: Cycling
- Current team: Retired
- Disciplines: Road; Track
- Role: Rider
- Rider type: Climber

Amateur teams
- 2007–2010: ?
- 2010: An Post–Sean Kelly (stagiaire)
- 2013: AC Bisontine
- 2013: H&R Block (guest)
- 2013: Cofidis (stagiaire)
- 2015: Scott Donnybrook Landscape Co.
- 2016: Baguet–MIBA Poorten–Indule
- 2017: AC Bisontine
- 2018: STRATA3–VeloRevolution Racing

Professional teams
- 2011: An Post–Sean Kelly
- 2012: Node 4–Giordana Racing
- 2014: Synergy Baku
- 2017: H&R Block Pro Cycling

Major wins
- National Under-23 Road Race Championships (2012)

Philip Lavery (born 17 August 1990, in Dublin) is an Irish former professional racing cyclist. Lavery won the 2010 Tour of the North and won a bronze medal at the 2010 Commonwealth Games in India, as part of the Northern Irish team pursuit squad. During the summer of 2013, Lavery joined the Cofidis team as a stagiaire, after taking several victories in French domestic racing.

== Major results ==
2007
2nd Road race, National Junior Road Championships
2009
3rd Road race, National Under-23 Road Championships
2010
1st Overall Tour of the North

1st Stages 1 & 2

1st Kruiseke Wevrik
2nd Lincoln Grand Prix
3rd Team pursuit, Commonwealth Games
2011
2nd Road race, National Under-23 Road Championships
2012
1st Road race, National Under-23 Road Championships
1st Shay Elliott Memorial Race
1st Stephen Roche GP
1st Roy Thame Cup
2nd La Ronde Pévèloise
3rd Road race, National Road Championships
2013
1st Le Souvenir Jean Lacroix
1st Tour du Charolais
1st Prix des Vallons
1st Stage 1 Tour de Franche-Comté
2nd Road race, National Road Championships
2nd Annemasse–Bellegarde
