= Robert Power (Irish cyclist) =

Irish cyclist

Personal information
- Born: 3 July 1971 (age 55) Dungarvan, Ireland

Cycling career
- Sport: Cycling

Robert Power (born 3 July 1971) is an Irish former cyclist. He competed in the team time trial at the 1992 Summer Olympics. Power won multiple races as a junior and senior rider in Ireland.

== Biography ==
Power was born in Dungarvan, Ireland, in 1971, and was an All-Ireland Schoolboy champion in 1989. At the Irish National Cycling Championships, Power won the junior title in 1988, and the senior title in 1993. The year after winning his junior title, he was awarded with the Junior Sports Award for cycling by the Cork Examiner.

At the 1992 Summer Olympics in Barcelona, he was part of the Irish team that finished in 17th place (out of 30 teams) that took part in the men's team trial. Power was also scheduled to race in the men's individual road race at the Olympics, but prior to the race he broke his collar bone in a fall while training. He also suffered internal bleeding on his kidneys, spending nearly two months in hospital. The injury led Power to retire from cycling at the age of 24. However, in 2012, Power made a return to racing.

Outside of cycling, Power was a professional photographer and also fished internationally for Ireland.
