= Morris Foster =

Irish cyclist (1936–2020)

Personal information
- Born: 26 October 1936 Maghera, Northern Ireland
- Died: 3 February 2020 (aged 83)

Cycling career
- Sport: Cycling

Amateur team
- Cyprus CC

Hugh Morrison Foster better known as Morris Foster (26 October 1936 – 3 February 2020) was an racing cyclist from Northern Ireland who competed at the 1968 Summer Olympics.

== Biography ==
Foster was a member of the Cyprus Cycling Club. He represented Belfast in the 1965 Guinness Tour of the North and won the 1966 King's Moss 13.5 miles time trial.

Foster represented the 1966 Northern Irish Team at the 1966 British Empire and Commonwealth Games in Kingston, Jamaica.

While in Jamaica, he had to train under escort following the assault and robbery of one of the Scottish cylists while training. He participated two events; the road race and the 10 miles scratch race.

At the 1968 Olympic Games in Mexico City, he participated in the individual road race.

At his second Commonwealth Games in 1970 in Edinburgh, Scotland, he was given the honour of being his country's flag bearer.

An electrician by profession, Foster won 17 national titles at the Irish National Cycling Championships; a 2 miles track championship, the road race over 100 miles in 1963, two 25 miles time trials, eight 50 miles time trials, four 100 miles times trials and a 12 hour time trial.

Later, he was President of the Northern Ireland Cycling Federation and received an MBE in 2006 Birthday Honours.
