= Colm Nulty =

Irish cyclist

Cycling career
- Sport: Cycling
- Discipline: Road bicycle racing
- Role: Rider

Amateur teams
- St. Patrick's Cycling Club
- Boyne Valley
- Tailteann
- Meath Nulty Providers

Major wins
- Rás Tailteann, 1971

Colm Nulty is an Irish cyclist. He won the Rás Tailteann in 1971.

== Early life ==
Nulty is a native of County Meath.

== Career ==
Nulty began his career in 1965, racing with the St. Patrick's club. He won the 1971 Rás Tailteann, racing with the Meath A Team.

In 1974 Nulty won the Laragh Classic and the Rás Mumhan.

Nulty won the Irish National Cycling Championships (NCA) 100-mile race in 1972, 1974 and 1976.

In 1977 he won the Rudge Cup and the Liam Toolan Memorial. His last title was the 1981 Midland Cup Road Race.
