= Dave Kane (cyclist) =

Northern Irish cyclist

Personal information
- Nationality: British (Northern Irish)
- Born: c.1941 Northern Ireland

Sport
- Sport: Cycling
- Events: Road race, 10 mile scratch
- Club: Northern CC, Belfast

David Kane (born c.1941) is a former racing cyclist from Northern Ireland, who represented Northern Ireland at two Commonwealth Games.

== Biography ==
Kane was a member of the Northern Cycling Club, based in Belfast.

Kane represented the 1966 Northern Irish Team at the 1966 British Empire and Commonwealth Games in Kingston, Jamaica.

While in Jamaica, he had to train under escort following the assault and robbery of one of the Scottish cylists while training. He participated in the road race.

Kane won four national titles at the Irish National Cycling Championships; three 2 miles track championships and one 100 miles time trial race and represented Ireland at national level. He also won Northern Ireland national titles, including the 1964 road race.

Kane worked at the Harland and Wolff shipyards before becoming a cycling salesman in Belfast and built up a successful family business. His daughter Debbie was an Irish cycling champion and his son Mark Kane raced at the 1992 Summer Olympics.
