= Heather Wilson (cyclist) =

Irish racing cyclist

Personal information
- Full name: Heather Wilson
- Born: 1 April 1982 (age 44) Ireland

Cycling career
- Sport: Cycling
- Current team: Maryland Wheelers (Lisburn, County Down)
- Disciplines: Road, Track & Time-Trials
- Role: Rider

Major wins
- National Road Championships 2009

Heather Lindsay Wilson (born 1 April 1982) is an Irish racing cyclist and triathlete.

== Palmarès ==
2006

- 2nd, Irish National Time Trial Championships
- 3rd, Irish National Road Race Championships
- 3rd, Stage 2, Danny Boy International, Limavady

2007

- 3rd, Irish National Time Trial Championships

2008

- 2nd, Irish National Time Trial Championships
- 3rd, Irish National Road Race Championships

2009

- 1st, Irish National Elite Road Race Championships (CN)
- 2nd, Irish National Time Trial Championships

2010

- 2nd, Irish National Time Trial Championships
- 12th, Irish National Elite Road Race Championships
