= Louise Moriarty =

Irish racing cyclist from Dublin (born 1978)

Personal information
- Full name: Louise Moriarty
- Born: 17 January 1978 (age 48) Ireland

Cycling career
- Sport: Cycling
- Discipline: Road
- Role: Rider

Professional team
- 2008–: Swift Racing

Louise Moriarty (born 22 December 1978) is an Irish racing cyclist from Dublin. She was the Irish National Time Trial Champion in 2006 and 2007.

In 2008, Moriarty broke the national pursuit record at Newport Velodrome, Wales, setting a new time of 3:55.853, beating the old record of 3:59.194 by over three seconds. The new record took her within two seconds of qualifying for the world championships. She also became the Irish 500m TT, points race, scratch race and pursuit champion.

== Palmarès ==
2002
3rd Irish National Road Race Championships
2nd Irish National Time Trial Championships

2005
3rd Irish National Road Race Championships

2006
1st Irish National Time Trial Championships
2nd Irish National Road Race Championships

2007
1st Tielt-Winge (BEL)
1st Irish National Time Trial Championships
3rd Irish National Road Race Championships

2008
1st 500m TT, Irish National Track Championships
1st Points race, Irish National Track Championships
1st Scratch race, Irish National Track Championships
1st Pursuit, Irish National Track Championships
3rd Irish National Time Trial Championships
2nd Irish National Road Race Championships
2nd Brasschaat/Maria-ter-Heide (BEL)
1st General Classification Ras na mBan (IRL)

1st Stage 1 Ras na mBan, Sneem (IRL)
1st Stage 2 Ras na mBan, Sneem (IRL)

2011
2nd Irish National Road Race Championships
