= Declan Lonergan =

Irish cyclist (born 1969)

Personal information
- Born: July 25, 1969 (age 57) County Waterford, Ireland
- Height: 6 ft 0 in (1.83 m)
- Weight: 170 lb (77 kg)

Cycling career
- Sport: Cycling
- Discipline: Road bicycle racing
- Role: Rider

Major wins
- Rás Tailteann, 1994

Declan Lonergan (born 25 July 1969) was an Irish cyclist. He won the Rás Tailteann in 1994.

== Career ==
Lonergan won the Rás Tailteann in 1994.

Lonergan competed in the points race at the 1996 Summer Olympics, finishing 22nd, and also competed in the 1996 UCI Track Cycling World Cup Classics.
