= Mark Kane =

Irish cyclist

Personal information
- Born: 21 November 1970 (age 55)
- Height: 1.75 m (5 ft 9 in)
- Weight: 62 kg (137 lb; 9 st 11 lb)

Cycling career
- Sport: Cycling

Mark Kane (born 21 November 1970) is an Irish former racing cyclist who competed at the 1992 Summer Olympics.

== Biography ==
At the 1992 Olympic Games in Barcelona, Kane participated in the team time trial.

His father Dave Kane raced at the British Empire and Commonwealth Games and his mother Debbie was an Irish national champion.
