= Tony Lally =

Irish cyclist

Personal information
- Full name: Anthony Lally
- Born: 26 October 1953 (age 72) Dublin, Ireland

Cycling career
- Sport: Cycling

Anthony Lally (born 26 October 1953) is an Irish former road-racing cyclist, who competed in the individual road race event at the 1980 Summer Olympics.

== Life ==
Lally comes from Cabra, an inner suburb west of central Dublin.

=== Cycling career ===
Lally raced nationally and internationally from 1971 to 1983.

He won the Tour of Ireland in 1974, at age 20, the youngest winner. He was National Road Race Champion in 1977 and 1978.

Lally's father was Mick Lally, honoured by an annual memorial race, or sometimes series of races, by the Dublin Wheelers cycling club, and his elder brothers, Sean and Jimmy, also raced, as did a grandson, Connor.

=== Later life ===
Lally retired from competitive cycling and moved to Australia shortly after his Olympic appearance, living in Sydney. He held a number of senior executive positions and finished his career as CEO of Sunsuper. He then had a career as a non executive director and chair of a number of businesses in financial services.

He continues to ride his bike in Sydney.
