= Melanie Späth =

Irish cyclist

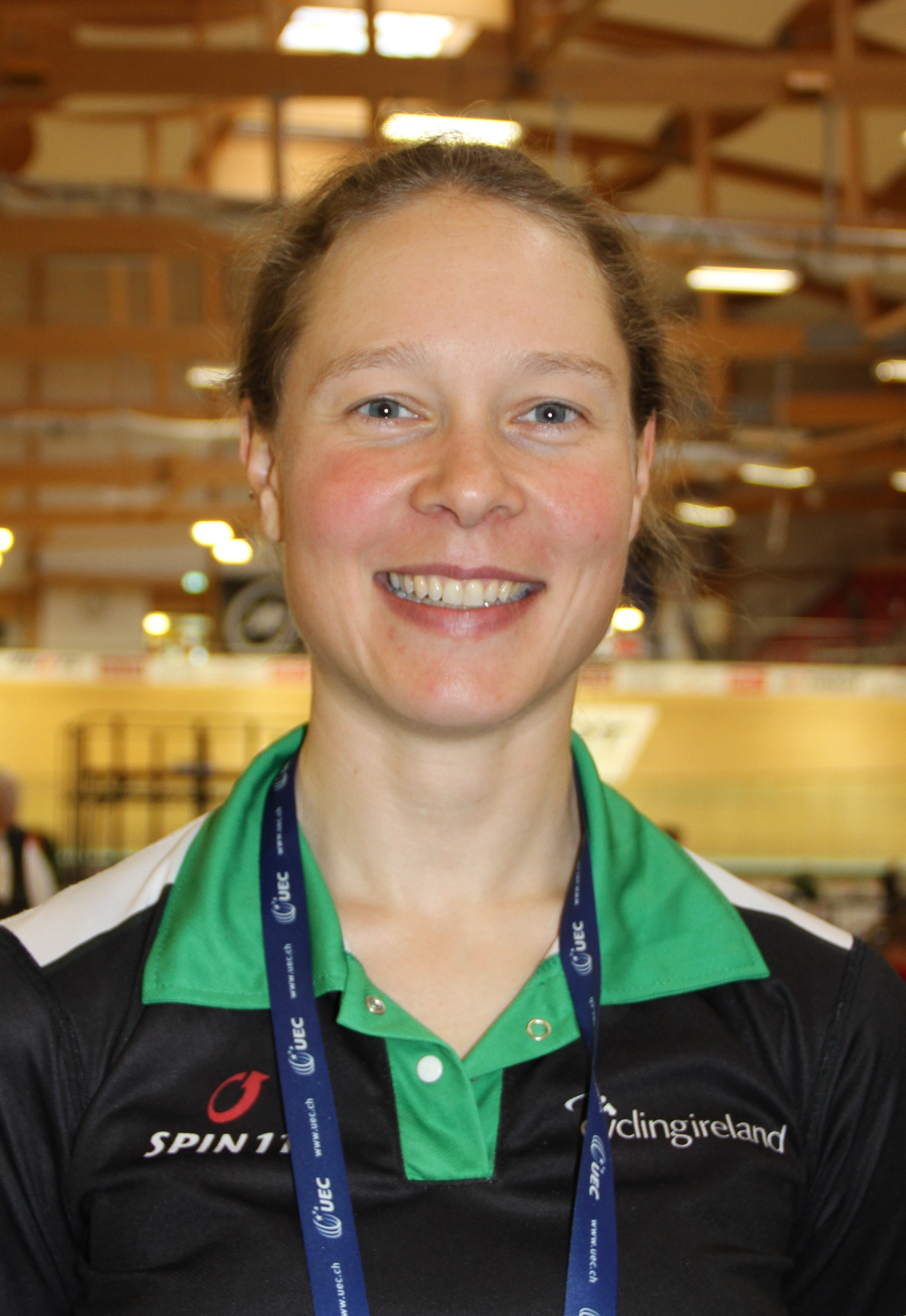
- Spath at the 2015 UEC European Track Championships

Personal information
- Born: 16 June 1981 (age 45) Flensburg, Germany

Cycling career
- Sport: Cycling
- Role: Rider

Professional team
- 2014: Team Rytger

Melanie Späth (born 16 June 1981) is an Irish racing cyclist. She competed in the 2013 UCI women's road race in Florence.

== Major results ==
2015
3rd Individual Pursuit, Belgian Xmas Meetings
