= Tommy Talbot =

Northern Irish cyclist (c. 1928–2022)

Personal information
- Nationality: British (Northern Irish)
- Born: c. 1928
- Died: March 2022

Sport
- Sport: Cycling
- Event(s): Track and Road
- Club: East Tyrone CC, Cookstown.

Tommy Talbot (c. 1928 – March 2022) was a racing cyclist from Northern Ireland, who represented Northern Ireland at the British Empire Games (now Commonwealth Games).

== Biography ==
Talbot was a member of the East Tyrone Cycling Club of Cookstown and rode for Ireland for the first time in 1955. Talbot's brother Bobby was also a successful rider during the 1950s.

He represented the 1958 Northern Irish Team at the 1958 British Empire and Commonwealth Games in Cardiff, Wales, participating in two cycling program events; the individual pursuit and the scratch race

Talbot won the Cyprus CC hill-climb for five consecutive years from 1954 to 1958 before retiring shortly after the 1958 games. However he returned to racing in 1963 and continued to win races and was still riding as a veteran racer for Old Bleach aged 70.

Talbot died in March 2022.
