= Fiona Meade =

Irish cyclist

Personal information
- Born: 30 April 1981 (age 45)

Cycling career
- Sport: Cycling
- Role: Rider

Fiona Meade (born 30 April 1981) is an Irish professional racing cyclist. She rode in the women's road race at the 2015 UCI Road World Championships.

== Major results ==
2010
3rd National Championship, Road Race

2011
1st Stage 1 Rás na mBan

2012
6th Overall Rás na mBan

1st County Rider Classification

2013
1st County Rider Classification Rás na mBan

2014
1st National Championship, Road Race
1st Points classification Rás na mBan

1st Stage 4

2016
3rd National Championship, Road Race

2017
3rd National Championship, Cyclo-cross
