= Séamus Herron =

Irish cyclist (1934–2021)

Personal information
- Born: 11 June 1934 Belfast, Northern Ireland
- Died: August 2021
- Height: 173 cm (5 ft 8 in)
- Weight: 68 kg (150 lb)

Sport
- Sport: Cycling
- Club: Northern C.C., Belfast

Séamus Herron (11 June 1934 – 2021) was a cyclist from Northern Ireland who competed at the 1960 Summer Olympics.

== Biography ==
At the 1960 Olympic Games in Rome, he participated in the individual road race.

Herron represented the 1958 Northern Irish Team at the 1958 British Empire and Commonwealth Games in Cardiff, Wales, participating in one cycling program event; the road race.

Herron died in 2021.
