= Sam Kerr (cyclist) =

Northern Irish cyclist (born c. 1937)

Personal information
- Nationality: British (Northern Irish)
- Born: c. 1937

Sport
- Sport: Cycling
- Event: Road
- Club: Ballymena RC

Sam Kerr (born c. 1937) is a former racing cyclist from Northern Ireland, who represented Northern Ireland at the British Empire Games (now Commonwealth Games).

== Biography ==
Kerr was a member of the Ballymena Road Club and came to prominence in August 1956, when he set the second fastest time for the 50 miles time trial in Ireland that year.

Residing at Glenariff Crescent in Ballymena, Kerr was a butcher by profession.

He was nominated by the Northern Ireland Cycling Federation for the shortlist for the 1958 British Empire and Commonwealth Games in Cardiff, Wales. He subsequently represented the 1958 Northern Irish Team at the 1958 British Empire and Commonwealth Games, participating in one cycling program event; the road race
