= Shay Elliott Memorial Race =

Annual Irish road racing cycling race

Race details
- Date: May
- Region: Ireland
- Local name: Shay Elliott Memorial Race
- Discipline: Road race
- Type: One-day race
- Organiser: Bray Wheelers

History
- First edition: 1958
- Editions: 68 (as of 2026)
- First winner: (Republic of Ireland) John Lackey
- Most wins: 2 times: (Republic of Ireland) Vinny Higgins (Republic of Ireland) Paul Elliot (Republic of Ireland) Joe Smyth (Republic of Ireland) Terry Colbert (Republic of Ireland) Sean Kelly (Republic of Ireland) Alan McCormack (Republic of Ireland) John Shortt (Republic of Ireland) David O'Loughlin (Republic of Ireland) Ronan McLaughlin
- Most recent: (Republic of Ireland) Conn McDunphy

The Shay Elliott Memorial race is a one-day road cycling race held in spring in Ireland. It is run in honour of Ireland's first professional cyclist, Seamus Shay Elliott and organised by Bray Wheelers. The race was previously known as the Route de Chill Mhantain ("Wicklow Route"), became the Shay Elliott Trophy in the late sixties, then the Shay Elliott Memorial after his death in 1971. The race is the most prestigious Irish one-day event after the national championships.

== History ==
In 1958, the first Route de Chill Mhantáin was held, organised by Bray Wheelers, a cycling club from Bray, County Wicklow. It was devised by Joe Loughman, one of the main organisers of the club, who wanted to present a tough race over the Wicklow Mountains. The Route de Chill Mhantáin was the first open massed-start race that Bray Wheelers had organised. The first edition was won by John Lackey.

The race was renamed The Shay Elliott Memorial in 1972. The trophy presented each year was won by Elliott himself as a prize for best amateur in France in 1955. Winners of the race include some of the best of Irish cycling, including two-time champion Sean Kelly (who was the only rider to have won the race while still a junior), former professional Peter Crinnion, two time Tour of Ireland winner Pat McQuaid, Peter Doyle (the first rider to win the Tour of Ireland and the Ras Tailteann) and Phil Cassidy (a two-time winner of the Ras Tailteann). In 2002 the race became an international race.

The 2015 edition of the race was won by former Track World Champion Martyn Irvine.

== Format ==
The open mass-start race traditionally begins in Bray, and finishes there too, after taking a loop that goes over the Wicklow Mountains, including the steep ascent of the Old Wicklow Gap, locally known as Croghan, as well as the Glenmalure climb where the Shay Elliott monument lies by the roadside. In recent years there have been a number of variations of the course, starting in Laragh and finished atop the Shay Elliott climb at Glenmalure.

== Past winners ==
Year	Country	Rider	Team
1958	Ireland	John Lackey	Tailteann CC
1959	Ireland	Peter Crinnion	Bray Wheelers CC
1960	Ireland	Vinny Higgins	Obelisk CC
1961	Ireland	Paul Elliot	Bray Wheelers CC
1962	Ireland	Paul Elliot	Bray Wheelers CC
1963	Ireland	Vinny Higgins	Obelisk CC
1964	Ireland	Noel O'Neill	Bray Wheelers CC
1965	Ireland	Terry Colbert	Tailteann CC
1966	Ireland	Maurice Foster	Cyprus CC
1967	Ireland	Hughie Davis	Lorraine
1968	Ireland	Peter Doyle	Bray Wheelers CC
1969	Ireland	Terry Colbert	Tailteann
1970	Ireland	Joe Smyth	Cyprus CC
1971	Ireland	Joe Smyth	Cyprus CC
1972	Ireland	Pat McQuaid	Emerald CC
1973	Ireland	Peter Doyle	Bray Wheelers CC
1974	Ireland	Sean Kelly	Carrick Road
1975	Ireland	Sean Kelly	Carrick Road
1976	Ireland	Alan McCormack	Eagle
1977	Ireland	Mick Nulty	Tailteann
1978	Ireland	Billy Kerr	Ballymena
1979	Ireland	Peter Morton	Les Jeunes
1980	Ireland	Alan McCormack	Eagle
1981	Ireland	Martin Earley	Les Jeunes
1982	Ireland	Philip Cassidy	Team Tirolia
1983	Ireland	Raphael Kimmage	Tara
1984	Ireland	John Shortt	Lusk
1985	Ireland	Frank Relf	Les Jeunes
1986	Ireland	John Shortt	Lusk team
1987	Ireland	Anthony O'Gorman	Clonmel
1988	Ireland	Paul McCormack	Eagle
1989	Ireland	Paul McQuaid	Emerald
1990	Ireland	Darach McQuaid	Emerald
1991	Ireland	Colm Maye	Rapparee
1992	Ireland	Robert Power	Waterford
1993	Ireland	Kevin Kimmage	Navan
1994	Ireland	Mark Kane	Northern
1995	Ireland	Richard McCauley	Bray Wheelers
1996	Ireland	David McCann	Phoenix
1997	Ireland	Ciaran Power	Comeragh
1998	Ireland	Michael O'Donnell	Bray Wheelers CC
1999	Ireland	Brian Kenneally	Carrick
2000	Ireland	Stephen O'Sullivan	Team Clarke
2001	Ireland	David Peelo	Irish Road Club
2002	Great Britain	Mark Lovatt	Compensation Group RT
2003	Italy	Alessandro Guerra	Endura Sport.com-Principia
2004	Ireland	David O'Loughlin	Team Total Cycling
2005	Great Britain	Kevin Dawson	Planet X
2006	Isle of Man	Andrew Roche	Murphy & Gunn-Newlyn–M Donnelly–Sean Kelly
2007	Great Britain	Malcolm Elliot	Pinarello
2008	Ireland	David O'Loughlin	Pezula Racing
2009	Great Britain	Matt Cronshaw	Rapha Condor
2010	Namibia	Dan Craven	Rapha Condor
2011	Ireland	Timmy Barry	The Edge CC
2012	Ireland	Philip Lavery	Node 4-Giordana Racing
2013	Ireland	Conor Murphy	Eurocycles-Eurobaby
2014	Ireland	Damien Shaw	Aquablue
2015	Ireland	Martyn Irvine	Madison Genesis
2016	Ireland	Marc Potts	Neon Velo
2017	Ireland	Darnell Moore	Caldwell Omagh
2018	Ireland	Ronan McLaughlin	Viner-Caremark-Pactimo
2019	Ireland	Ronan McLaughlin	Viner-Caremark-Pactimo
2021	Ireland	Matthew Teggart	VC Villefranche Beaujolais
2022	Ireland	Dean Harvey	Spellman-Dublin Port
2023	Ireland	Conn McDunphy	Lucan CRC
2024	Ireland	Mark Dowling	All Human/Vélo Revolution
2025	Ireland	Ronan O'Connor	Skyline Cycling
2026	Ireland	Conn McDunphy	APS Pro Cycling

Note - No race took place in 2020 due to the COVID-19 Pandemic
