= Connaughton =

Connaughton (Irish: Ó Connachtáin) is an Irish surname. Notable people with the surname include:

- Brian Connaughton (1899–1983), Irish policeman, recipient of the Scott Medal
- Brian Connaughton (born 1942/43), Irish cyclist
- Frank Connaughton (1869–1942), American baseball player
- Gary Connaughton, inter-county Gaelic footballer for Westmeath
- Harry Connaughton (1905–1969), American football player
- James L. Connaughton (born 1961), American energy industry lawyer and former environmental advisor
- Jared Connaughton (born 1985), Canadian sprinter
- John Connaughton (1949–2022), English former professional football goalkeeper
- Joseph Connaughton (cricketer) (1918–1944), English cricketer
- Kyle Connaughton, American chef
- Mary Z. Connaughton (born 1960), former board member of the Massachusetts Turnpike Authority
- Pat Connaughton (born 1993), American basketball and baseball player
- Paul Connaughton Snr (born 1944), Irish former Fine Gael politician
- Paul Connaughton Jnr (born 1982), Irish Fine Gael politician
- Richard Connaughton (born 1942), British Army officer and author specialised in military history
- Sean Connaughton (born 1961), former Secretary of Transportation for the Commonwealth of Virginia
- Shane Connaughton (born 1941), Irish writer and actor, co-writer of the screenplay for My Left Foot
