= David O'Loughlin (cyclist) =

Irish racing cyclist (born 1978)

Personal information
- Full name: David O'Loughlin
- Born: 29 April 1978 (age 48) County Mayo, Ireland

Cycling career
- Sport: Cycling
- Current team: Retired
- Disciplines: Road, Track (4k Individual Pursuit, Team Pursuit)
- Role: Rider

Amateur teams
- 1998: –
- 1999: DCM-Belgium
- 2000–2001: Zalf Fior

Professional teams
- 2002–2003: Ofoto-Lombardi Sports
- 2004: Total cycling.com
- 2005–2007: Navigators Insurance
- 2008: Pezula Cycling Team
- 2009–10: An Post–Sean Kelly
- 2011: Giant Kenda Cycling Team

Major wins
- Irish National Road Champion (2004, 2005, 2007); Irish National Time Trial Champion (2003, 2006); Irish National Criterium Champion (2006)

David O'Loughlin (born 29 April 1978 in County Mayo, Ireland) is an Irish former professional cyclist, who rode at the World Championship (in both Road and Track disciplines) and Olympic levels, and won Ireland's first UCI World Cup Track medal. O'Loughlin also won the national road championship three times.

== Career ==
=== Middle career ===
O'Loughlin turned professional in 2002 with Ofoto-Lombardi Sports for two seasons.

He won the Shay Elliot Memorial race and then stage 6 of the FBD Insurance Rás. He finished third in the Ras stage race as teammate to David McCann.

In June 2004, he became road champion of Ireland.

In 2005 he joined fellow Irish professional Ciarán Power in the Navigators Insurance Cycling Team. He came second in the mountains classification in the Jacob's Creek Tour Down Under. Later that year, he defended his Irish road title.

In 2006, he won the Irish time trial and broke the 4 km pursuit record. In 2007, he won back the Irish road champion's jersey, his 6th National Elite title. On 19 October 2007, O'Loughlin signed with a new Irish cycling team called Pezula cycling team.

He set his first Irish 4k individual pursuit national record of 4:25.31 seconds at the December 2007 Beijing World Cup meet. In February 2008, he became the first Irish pursuit rider to make a UCI Track World Cup medal race when he posted fourth fastest time in the 4k individual pursuit qualifying session in Copenhagen. In the bronze medal ride-off, he lost to Luke Roberts.

=== Olympics ===
On 12 June 2008, O'Loughlin qualified in the 4 km pursuit at the Beijing Olympics. In Beijing, he finished 11th with a poor heat time of 4:26.102. This meant that he did not qualify for the quarter-finals.

=== 2009-2011 ===
After signing for the An Post Sean Kelly professional team for the 2009 season, O'Loughlin won his and Ireland's first ever UCI Track World Cup medal when taking the 4 km Individual Pursuit bronze at the Beijing World Cup meet in January, defeating Volodomyr Diudia of Ukraine in the bronze medal race-off. He followed this with a silver medal at the Copenhagen World Cup meet in Denmark, losing out to Taylor Phinney of the US in the final. These results helped to a final UCI World Ranking of 8th for the 2008/09 4 km Individual Pursuit season on 590 pts. He was also a member of the Irish team pursuit squad which set national records when finishing 7th and 5th at the Beijing and Ballerup events respectively.

In October 2010, he announced his retirement from track racing to concentrate on road racing and his business interests. However, according to The Mayo News newspaper, dissatisfaction with the Irish track management and set up influenced his decision to retire from track racing. O'Loughlin also denied that his business interest was part of his reason to retire from track racing.

He returned to the competitive track action in 2011, when placing 14th in the European Points Race Championship, and then finishing 12th in the 4k IP at the 2011 Astana World Cup event.

== Major results ==
2011

Track:

- 12th, Track World Cup Rd 1 (Astana) 4km individual pursuit
  - time of 4:32.296 in qualifying heat; failed to qualify for Semi-finals
- 14th, Track European Championships – Points race (5 pt + 1 lap)
  - Qualified 8th in Heat 1

2010 – An Post–Sean Kelly

Road:

- 1st, Halfords Tour Series Belfast
- 4th, Irish National Time-Trial Championship (CN)
- 5th, Irish National Elite Road Race Championships (CN)
- 5th, Halfords Tour Series Dublin
- 43rd overall, FBD Insurance Ras (2.2)
  - 1st, Stage 3
  - 10th, Stage 7
  - Mountain class: 2nd (held the KoM jersey for Stages 4 and 5)

Track:

- 12th, Track World Championship (Ballerup, Copenhagen) 4km individual pursuit
  - time of 4:25.203 in heat, DNQ for finals
- 13th, Track World Championships – Team Pursuit
  - time of 4:12.136 in heat with Irish team (Stephen Barrett, Matthew Brammeier, and Martyn Irvine), DNQ
- 17th overall, 2009–10 UCI Track World Cup: Team Pursuit standings
  - 6th, Track World Cup Rd 3 (Cali) qualifying
    - time of 4:16.348 with Irish team (Matthew Brammeier, Marcus Christie and Martyn Irvine), DNQ
  - 13th, Track World Cup Rd 1 (Manchester) qualifying
    - time of 4:20.589 with Irish team (Stephen Barrett, Matthew Brammeier and David McCann), DNQ
- 20th overall, 2009–10 UCI Track World Cup: Points Race standings: 4 pts
  - 7th, Track World Cup Rd 3 (Cali) qualifying
  - 16th, Track World Cup Rd 1 (Manchester) qualifying

2009 – An Post–M.Donnelly–Grant Thornton–Sean Kelly

Road:

- 2nd, Irish National Road Race Championship (CN)
- 10th overall, FBD Insurance Rás (2.2)
  - 1st, Mountains class
  - 11th, Stage 2
  - 25th, Stage 7
  - 26th, Stage 3
- 12th overall, Boucles de la Mayenne (2.2)
  - 9th, Mountains class
  - 12th, Stage 1
  - 33rd, Stage 3
  - 40th, Stage 2
- 40th, Halle – Ingooigem (1.1)
- 52nd overall, Vuelta Ciclista Internacional an Extremadura (2.2)
  - 19th, Stage 5

Track:

- 4th overall, 2008–09 UCI Track World Cup: 4km individual pursuit standings 18 pts
  - 2nd, Track World Cup Rd 5 (Copenhagen)
    - lapped by Taylor Phinney in Gold medal race
    - time of 4:24.891 in heat to qualify in 2nd place
  - 3rd, Track World Cup Rd 4 (Beijing)
    - time of 4:28.294 to beat Volodymyr Diudia in Bronze medal race
    - time of 4:27.563 in heat to qualify in 3rd place
- 12th overall, 2008–09 UCI Track World Cup: Team Pursuit standings 10 pts
  - 5th, Track World Cup Rd 5 (Copenhagen)
    - time of 4:11.587 with Irish team (Paul Healion, Martyn Irvine, and David McCann)
  - 7th, Track World Cup Rd 4 (Beijing)
    - time of 4:13.947 with Irish team (Paul Healion, Martyn Irvine, and David McCann)
- 15th, Track World Championship (Pruskow, Poland) 4km individual pursuit
  - time of 4:32.480 in heat, DNQ for finals

2008 – Pezula Cycling Team

Road:

- 1st, Shay Elliott Memorial Race
- 2nd, Stage 2, Giro Del Capo
- 59th overall, FBD Insurance Rás (2.2)
  - 1st, Stage 8
  - 3rd, Mountains class

Track:

- 4th, Track World Cup Rd 4 (Copenhagen) 4k individual pursuit
  - lost to Luke Roberts in Bronze medal race
- 6th, Track World Championship (Manchester) 4km individual pursuit
  - time of 4:20.9 in heat (Irish National Record), failed to qualify for finals
- 8th, Track World Cup Rd 3 (Los Angeles) 4k individual pursuit
  - time of 4:31.014 in heat, failed to qualify for finals
- 11th, Beijing Olympics 4km individual pursuit
  - time of 4:26.102 in heat, failed to qualify for quarter-finals

2007 – Navigators Insurance Cycling Team

Road:

- 1st, Irish National Road Race Championship (CN)
- 3rd, Irish National Time-trial Championship (CN)
- 5th overall, Tour de Beauce (2.2)
  - 4th, Stage 4a
  - 4th, Stage 4b
  - 5th, Stage 1
  - 8th, Stage 3
- 29th overall, Tour of Ireland (2.1)
  - 3rd, Stage 5

Track:

- 5th, Track World Cup Rd 3 (Los Angeles) 4k individual pursuit
- 7th, Track World Cup Rd 2 (Beijing) 4k individual pursuit
  - time of 4:25.310 in heat, failed to qualify for finals
- 8th Overall, 2006–2007 UCI Track World Cup standings 12 pts
- 8th, Track World Cup Rd 4 (Manchester) 4k individual pursuit
- 17th, Track World Championship (Palma de Mallorca) 4km individual pursuit
  - time of 4:30.595 in heat, failed to qualify for Semi-finals

2006 – Navigators Insurance Cycling Team

Road:

- 1st Irish National Time Trial Championship (CN)
- 1st Irish National Criterium Championship (CN)
- 1st overall, GC – McGrath Concrete Ras Connachta, (IRL)
  - 1st, Stage 2
  - 1st, Stage 4
- 4th overall, FBD Insurance Rás (2.2)
  - 3rd, Stage 4
  - 11th, Stage 3
  - 11th, Stage 9
- 2nd, Mt Holly – Smithville Invitational GP (USA)
- 6th, Irish National Road Race Championship (CN)
- 10th, Bank of America Criterium
- 30th, World Elite Time Trial Championship

Track:

- 8th, Track World Cup Rd 2 (Moscow) 4k individual pursuit

2005 – Navigators Insurance Cycling Team

- 1st Irish National Road Race Championship (CN)
- 1st, Mengoni G.P. (USA)
- 1st, Stage 3, G.P. Cyclist de Beauce (CAN)
- 1st, Points Competition, G.P. Cyclist de Beauce (CAN)
- 1st, Stage 1 – Ballinrobe-Statoil Two-Day (IRL)
- 1st, Carraig Hotel Challenge Cup (IRL)
- 38th, World Elite Time Trial Championship

2004 – Totalcycling.com-Litespeed

- 1st Irish National Road Race Championship (CN)
- 1st, Shay Elliott Memorial Race
- 1st, Lincoln International GP (GBR)
- 3rd overall, FBD Milk Rás (2.5)
  - 1st, Stage 6
- 38th, World Elite Time Trial Championship

2003 – Ofoto-Lombardi Sports

- 1st Irish National Time-trial championship (CN)
- 1st, Archer International GP (GBR)
- 3rd, Irish National Road Race Championship (CN)
- 25th, World B Championship Road Race

2002 – Ofoto-Lombardi Sports

- 2nd, Stage 5 – Tour of Hokkaido (JPN)

2000 – Zalf Fior

- 4th, Irish National Road Race Championship (CN)
- 5th overall, FBD Milk Rás
  - KOM class: 8th
- 10th, World U23 Time Trial Championship

1999 – DCM-Belgium

- 7th, Irish National Road Race Championship (CN)

1998

- 8th, Irish National Road Race Championship (CN)
