= Joseph Connaughton =

Joseph Connaughton may refer to:

- Joseph Connaughton (cricketer) (1918–1944), English cricketer
- Joseph Connaughton (politician) (c. 1838–1875), member of the Louisiana state legislature
