= Paddy Flanagan =

- Born: 1941; Kildangan, County Kildare
- Died: 21 November 2000
- Occupation: Cyclists
- Relatives: Ned Flanagan (brother)

Paddy Flanagan (1941 – 21 November 2000) was one of the top Irish cyclists of the 1960s and 1970s. He came to prominence in the Rás Tailtean. He rode his first in the Rás Tailtean in 1958 and came 11th. The following year he came second. He won in 1960 and again in 1964, the first to win twice. He had two stage wins and three top five finishes in the years to 1969

Flanagan and his brother Ned joined the Irish Cycling Federation in 1969. He finished the Tour of Ireland where he finished in fourth place. He rejoined the National Cycling Association and rode the 1974 Rás. The following year he won it for the third time. His rise coincided with that of fellow Irishmen, Sé O'Hanlon and Gene Mangan. This trio along with others, were known as "Men of the Rás".

== Bibliography ==
- Daly, Tom (2003). The Rás – The Story Of Ireland’s Unique Bike Race. The Collins Press. ISBN 1-903464-37-4.
