= 2009 Tour of Ireland =

UCI Europe Tour

Race details
- Dates: 21–23 August 2009
- Stages: 3
- Distance: 577 km (358.5 mi)
- Winning time: 14h 18' 03"

Results
Jersey awarded to the overall winner	Winner	Russell Downing (GBR)	(CandiTV – Marshall's Pasta)
	Second	Lars Petter Nordhaug (NOR)	(Joker–Bianchi)
	Third	Matti Breschel (DEN)	(Team Saxo Bank)
Jersey awarded to the points classification winner	Points	Russell Downing (GBR)	(CandiTV – Marshall's Pasta)
Jersey awarded to the mountains classification winner	Mountains	Matt Wilson (AUS)	(Team Type 1)
Jersey awarded to the youth classification winner	Youth	Matti Breschel (DEN)	(Team Saxo Bank)
	Team	Team Saxo Bank	

The 2009 Tour of Ireland was the 35th running of the Tour of Ireland stage race. The event was held from 21–23 August. It consisted of three stages, and was rated as a 2.1 event on the UCI Europe Tour.

== Participating teams ==
The 16 teams that participated in the race were:

UCI ProTour Teams

- AST - Astana
- SAX - Team Saxo Bank
- THR - Team Columbia–HTC

UCI Professional Continental Teams

- BMC - BMC Racing Team
- CTT - Cervélo TestTeam
- ISD - ISD–NERI

UCI Continental Teams

- SKT - An Post–Sean Kelly Team
- MTN - MTN Energade
- HAF - Team Halfords Bikehut
- TMB - Joker–Bianchi
- TT1 - Team Type 1
- CTV - CandiTV – Marshall's Pasta
- RCR - Rapha Condor
- RB3 - Rabobank continental team

Pro National Teams

- Irish National Team
- Australian National Team

== Stages ==
=== Stage 1 ===
21 August 2009 - Powerscourt to Waterford, 196 km

This stage began at the Ritz-Carlton hotel in Enniskerry and immediately the peloton set to climbing, with a third-category climb coming after 7 km. The course continued to be hilly after that, marked by the first-category Mount Leinster climb coming about halfway into the stage. There were two more categorized climbs and a few smaller rises later on.

Many ultimately unsuccessful breakaway attempts occurred in the stage's first hour, including defending mountains champion Matt Wilson topping the first category three climb in first position. The first escapee to stay away for any amount of time was MTN's Jay Thomson, who was the first over Mount Leinster and Coppanagh, putting him second in the King of the Mountains standings at the end of the day (as Wilson took maximum points from the peloton on those climbs). Thomson badly bonked on the day's last climb, and wound up being passed by escapees from the main peloton. First to pass him by was Philip Lavery of the Irish National Team, and then came the rest of the 23-man group, one that included numerous big names such as Lance Armstrong, Stuart O'Grady, and defending Tour of Ireland champion Marco Pinotti. With Mark Cavendish stuck in the peloton 2' 12" behind the leaders, the stage win was wide open. After numerous attacks and counterattacks Russell Downing was the man to time his sprint just right, getting to the line a second ahead of seven other riders. Armstrong, O'Grady, and twelve others finished 16 seconds back. Time bonuses won at the finish line and in intermediate sprints meant the first General Classification was not the same as the Stage 1 result.

Stage 1 Result

	Rider	Team	Time
1	Russell Downing (GBR)	CandiTV – Marshall's Pasta	5h 10' 37"
2	Alexandr Kolobnev (RUS)	Team Saxo Bank	+ 1"
3	Matti Breschel (DEN)	Team Saxo Bank	s.t.
4	Philip Deignan (IRL)	Cervélo TestTeam	s.t.
5	Haimar Zubeldia (ESP)	Astana	s.t.
6	Marco Pinotti (ITA)	Team Columbia–HTC	s.t.
7	Frederik Wilmann (NOR)	Joker–Bianchi	s.t.
8	Oleksandr Kvachuk (UKR)	ISD–NERI	s.t.
9	Jakob Fuglsang (DEN)	Team Saxo Bank	+ 7"
10	Denys Kostyuk (UKR)	ISD–NERI	+ 16"

General Classification after Stage 1

	Rider	Team	Time
1	Russell Downing (GBR)	CandiTV – Marshall's Pasta	5h 10' 27"
2	Alexandr Kolobnev (RUS)	Team Saxo Bank	+ 5"
3	Matti Breschel (DEN)	Team Saxo Bank	+ 7"
4	Philip Deignan (IRL)	Cervélo TestTeam	+ 11"
5	Haimar Zubeldia (ESP)	Astana	+ 11"
6	Marco Pinotti (ITA)	Team Columbia–HTC	+ 11"
7	Frederik Wilmann (NOR)	Joker–Bianchi	+ 11"
8	Oleksandr Kvachuk (UKR)	ISD–NERI	+ 11"
9	Jakob Fuglsang (DEN)	Team Saxo Bank	+ 17"
10	Andriy Hryvko (UKR)	ISD–NERI	+ 24"

=== Stage 2 ===
22 August 2009 - Clonmel to Killarney, 196 km

The first An Post sprint of the day was at Ardfinnan after 9km.

The climbing again began early on this stage, with a second-category climb occurring after 27.5 km. After the descent and one short uncategorized hill, the course was flat until another second-category climb, Musheramore, at the 135 km mark. Immediately after the descent from Musheramore was Curragh, a climb that was shorter, but steeper, and was categorized higher at first-category.

Mark Cassidy of An Post–Sean Kelly sprinted out of the bunch immediately after the neutralized section of this stage. He was joined by Rabobank's Dennis Van Winden, and they were together through the three sprints and the first two climbs on the stage. The peloton was quite willing to let these two get a huge advantage, and their time gap over the main field ballooned to over ten minutes. It was between the third sprint and the last climb that Van Winden attacked and shed Cassidy, who hit the wall and wound up finishing over nine minutes back of the peloton at the finish. Van Winden was caught shortly after the descent from Curragh, but he managed to finish with the peloton, despite having been in a breakaway for 174 of the stage's 196 kilometers. Van Winden won each of the day's climbs and in so doing poised to challenge Matt Wilson for the King of the Mountains championship, but Wilson took maximum points from the peloton on each climb and finished the day with a 4-point lead. The mass sprint finish took place, with Mark Cavendish easily outclassing the other sprinters in the field.

Each of the 23 riders who made the selective break in Stage 1 finished with the peloton, meaning race leader Russell Downing had 22 riders within 26 seconds of him going into the decisive third stage. It was on a stage much like this in the 2008 Tour of Ireland that Downing lost his race lead, but he expressed confidence after the stage that he would be able to keep it this year, as the finishing circuit in Cork for the 2009 race is shorter than it was in 2008. Team Columbia-HTC made it clear that their focus for Stage 3 would not be Cavendish, who freely admitted the circuit was probably too tough for him, but for defending Tour of Ireland champion Marco Pinotti, 11 seconds back of Downing.

Stage 2 Result

	Rider	Team	Time
1	Mark Cavendish (GBR)	Team Columbia–HTC	5h 07' 33"
2	Michael Van Staeyen (BEL)	Rabobank Continental	s.t.
3	Stuart O'Grady (AUS)	Team Saxo Bank	s.t.
4	Alexander Kristoff (NOR)	Joker–Bianchi	s.t.
5	Steven Van Vooren (BEL)	An Post–Sean Kelly Team	s.t.
6	Martin Reimer (GER)	Cervélo TestTeam	s.t.
7	Ian Wilkinson (GBR)	Team Halfords Bikehut	s.t.
8	Christoff Van Heerden (RSA)	MTN Energade	s.t.
9	Pierpaolo De Negri (ITA)	ISD–NERI	s.t.
10	Juan Van Heerden (RSA)	MTN Energade	s.t.

General Classification after Stage 2

	Rider	Team	Time
1	Russell Downing (GBR)	CandiTV – Marshall's Pasta	10h 18' 00"
2	Alexandr Kolobnev (RUS)	Team Saxo Bank	+ 5"
3	Matti Breschel (DEN)	Team Saxo Bank	+ 7"
4	Philip Deignan (IRL)	Cervélo TestTeam	+ 10"
5	Marco Pinotti (ITA)	Team Columbia–HTC	+ 11"
6	Haimar Zubeldia (ESP)	Astana	+ 11"
7	Frederik Wilmann (NOR)	Joker–Bianchi	+ 11"
8	Jakob Fuglsang (DEN)	Team Saxo Bank	+ 17"
9	Stuart O'Grady (AUS)	Team Saxo Bank	+ 22"
10	Andriy Hryvko (UKR)	ISD–NERI	+ 23"

=== Stage 3 ===
23 August 2009 - Bantry to Cork, 185 km

This course defines undulation, with more than a dozen rises in elevation, though only three are categorized. The peloton will take three laps of a finishing circuit in Cork, taking three passes over the first-category St. Patrick's Hill. Uniquely, only the second and third passes over the climb will count toward the climbers' prize, while the first pass is an intermediate sprint.

As was expected, the third stage broke the field up more than either of the first two had. The largest group to cross the line together was the eight riders classified third through tenth, those with the same time as Matti Breschel. Many riders crossed the line alone, and two members of Team Joker Bianchi finished almost 21 minutes behind the stage winner. 57 riders also withdrew during the stage (one did not start), including the two the event had most used to promote itself, Lance Armstrong and Mark Cavendish.

There was no significant breakaway on the day. Rather, the exact opposite seemed to take place, as riders little by little dropped off the pace of the leading group and either abandoned the race or finished many minutes behind the leaders. The last two together were Lars Petter Nordhaug and race leader Russell Downing. Since Downing had the event overall sewn up, Nordhaug took the stage. Downing's performance on this stage marked a significant improvement over the Cork stage from the 2008 Tour, where he, as race leader, was dropped and conceded the final yellow jersey to Marco Pinotti. On this day, it was Pinotti who was dropped before the finish, finding himself in the first chase group 33 seconds behind Nordhaug and Downing. The climbs were taken by riders who had not yet scored any significant points in that classification, so Matt Wilson was able to come away with his second consecutive King of the Mountains win.

Stage 3 Result

	Rider	Team	Time
1	Lars Petter Nordhaug (NOR)	Joker–Bianchi	4h 00' 10"
2	Russell Downing (GBR)	CandiTV - Marshall's Pasta	s.t.
3	Matti Breschel (DEN)	Team Saxo Bank	+ 33"
4	Craig Lewis (USA)	Team Columbia–HTC	s.t.
5	Alexandr Kolobnev (RUS)	Team Saxo Bank	s.t.
6	Mathias Frank (SUI)	BMC Racing Team	s.t.
7	Steven Kruijswijk (NED)	Rabobank Continental	s.t.
8	Marco Pinotti (ITA)	Team Columbia–HTC	s.t.
9	Karsten Kroon (NED)	Team Saxo Bank	s.t.
10	Denys Kostyuk (UKR)	ISD–NERI	s.t.

Final General Classification

	Rider	Team	Time
1	Russell Downing (GBR)	CandiTV – Marshall's Pasta	14h 18' 03"
2	Lars Petter Nordhaug (NOR)	Joker–Bianchi	+ 23"
3	Matti Breschel (DEN)	Team Saxo Bank	+ 43"
4	Alexandr Kolobnev (RUS)	Team Saxo Bank	+ 45"
5	Marco Pinotti (ITA)	Team Columbia–HTC	+ 49"
6	Mathias Frank (SUI)	BMC Racing Team	+ 1' 03"
7	Craig Lewis (USA)	Team Columbia–HTC	+ 1' 05"
8	Steven Kruijswijk (NED)	Rabobank Continental	+ 1' 06"
9	Denys Kostyuk (UKR)	ISD–NERI	+ 1' 06"
10	Jakob Fuglsang (DEN)	Team Saxo Bank	+ 1' 06"

== Jersey Progression ==
Stage (Winner)	General Classification	Points Classification	Mountains Classification	Young Rider Classification	Team Classification
Stage 1 (Russell Downing)	Russell Downing	Russell Downing	Matt Wilson	Matti Breschel	Team Saxo Bank
Stage 2 (Mark Cavendish)	Russell Downing	Alexander Kristoff	Matt Wilson	Matti Breschel	Team Saxo Bank
Stage 3 (Lars Petter Nordhaug)	Russell Downing	Russell Downing	Matt Wilson	Matti Breschel	Team Saxo Bank
Final	Russell Downing (Candi TV)	Russell Downing (Candi TV)	Matt Wilson (Team Type 1)	Matti Breschel (Team Saxo Bank)	Team Saxo Bank
