= Alan McCormack (cyclist) =

Irish cyclist

Personal information
- Born: 18 August 1956 (age 70) Carrick-on-Suir, County Tipperary, Ireland
- Height: 1.62 m (5 ft 4 in)
- Weight: 57 kg (126 lb; 9 st 0 lb)

Cycling career
- Sport: Cycling
- Current team: Retired
- Discipline: Road
- Role: Rider

Professional team
- 1987-1988: Schwinn

Alan McCormack (born 18 August 1956) is an Irish former cyclist. Originally from Carrick-on-Suir in County Tipperary, at the age of 19 he competed in the individual road race event at the 1976 Summer Olympics. He came third in the Rás Tailteann (behind Stephen Roche and Jean Claude Breure) in 1979, and won the Fitchburg Longsjo Classic in 1982.

His younger brother, Paul McCormack, was also a professional cyclist.
