= Mile-a-minute =

Mile-a-minute may refer to:

== People ==
- Charles Minthorn Murphy (1870–1950), nicknamed "Mile-a-minute" Murphy, American bicycle racer
- Mick Murphy (cyclist) (1934–2015), Irish cyclist, also nicknamed "Mile-a-minute" Murphy

== Plants ==
- Dipogon lignosus, a species of flowering plant in the legume family
- Fallopia baldschuanica, a species of flowering plant in the knotweed family
- Ipomoea cairica, a species of morning glory
- Mikania micrantha, a tropical plant in the family Asteraceae
- Persicaria perfoliata, (basionym Polygonum perfoliatum), a species of flowering plant in the buckwheat family

== See also ==
- 0 to 60 mph, the time to reach a mile-a-minute from rest
