= Dungarvan Castle =

12th century castle in Waterford, Ireland

- Caisleán Dhún Garbhán
- King John's Norman Castle
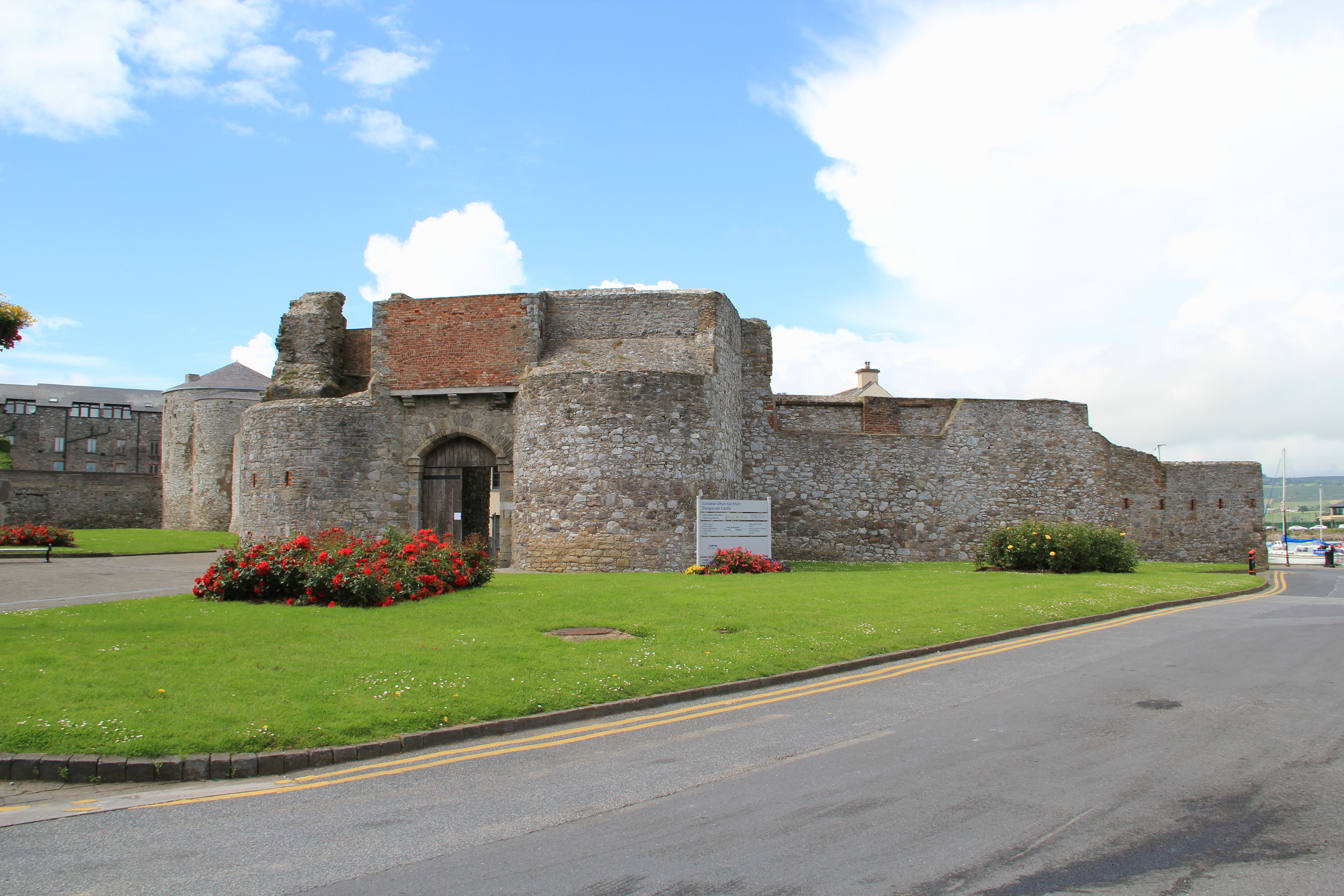

- Location within Ireland
- 52.089277°N 7.616229°W
- Type: Norman Castle
- Location: Dungarvan, County Waterford
- Region: Ireland

History
- Built: 1185

Site notes
- Owner: Public
- Public access: Yes

National monument of Ireland
- Official name: Dungarvan Castle
- Reference no.: 569

Dungarvan Castle or King John's Norman Castle is a National Monument situated in Dungarvan, County Waterford, Ireland.

== Description ==
Dungarvan Castle is composed of a polygonal shell keep, enclosed with a curtain wall, with corner and gate towers. The 12th-century shell keep is the earliest part of the structure, with this form of keep being common in England, but rare in Ireland. There is a two-storey military barracks within the walls dating from the early 18th century. These barracks are restored and holds the exhibition space displaying the history of the castle. The current structure sits on the site of a former Motte-and-bailey castle.

== History ==
The castle has been described as Anglo-Norman, and was founded in 1185 by Prince John, on the mouth of the Colligan River. It was amongst a number of castles built around this time in the south east of Ireland. The castle was used as a barracks during the Irish Civil War, then taken by the IRA who upon leaving in August 1922, set fire to the structure. After the foundation of the Garda Síochána in the Free State, the castle was restored and became the local Garda Station until 1987. After 1987 the castle fell into disrepair again, but under the management by Dúchas was restored and now provides guided tours, an exhibition and an audio-visual show.

== See also ==
- Castles in Great Britain and Ireland
- List of castles in Ireland
