= Brian Connaughton =

Brian Connaughton may refer to:

- Brian Connaughton (Scott Medal recipient) (1899–1983), Garda (Irish policeman)
- Brian Connaughton (cyclist) (born 1942/43), cyclist and Garda
