= Tom Finn =

Tom Finn may refer to:

- Tom Finn (cyclist), Irish cyclist
- Tom Finn (singer), member of The Left Banke
- Thomas Finn, an engineer killed in the St-Hilaire train disaster
