= Colligan River =

River in County Waterford, Ireland

Coordinates: 52.213932°N 7.600216°W

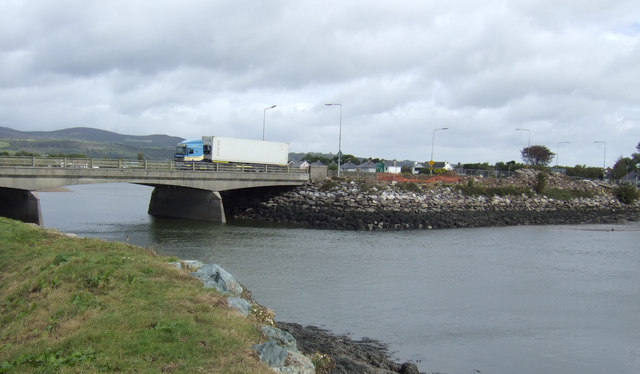
- Colligan River flowing under the N25 in Dungarvan
- Native name: Abhainn Choilligeáin (Irish)

Physical characteristics
- Source
  - location: Monavallagh Mountains
- Mouth
  - location: Celtic Sea at Dungarvan
- Length: 24 km (15 mi)
- Basin size: 108 km^{2} (42 sq mi)
- Discharge
  - average: 33.1 m^{3}/s (1,170 cu ft/s)

The Colligan River (Irish: Abhainn Choilligeáin) is a fast-flowing river in Ireland, flowing through County Waterford. It is reputed to be one of the fastest in Europe.

== Course ==
The Colligan River rises in the Monavullagh Mountains, flows southwards under the Scart Bridge, passes under the N72 at Kildangan, and then turns eastwards into a wide estuary at Dungarvan. It is bridged by the N25 (The Bypass) and R911 (The Causeway) before entering the Celtic Sea.

== Recreation ==
The Colligan River is a noted salmon and trout fishery. It is also used for whitewater kayaking.

== Parish ==
Colligan gives its name to a civil parish northeast of Dungarvan in the barony of Decies-without-Drum. There was formerly a roughly coterminous Catholic parish in the Diocese of Waterford and Lismore, which gave its name to Colligan–Emmets GAA club. The Catholic parish was later merged with Kilgobinet parish.

== See also ==
- Rivers of Ireland
