= Joe O'Brien (cyclist) =

Irish cyclist

Personal information
- Born: Ireland
- Died: Ireland

Cycling career
- Sport: Cycling
- Discipline: Road bicycle racing
- Role: Rider

Major wins
- Rás Tailteann, 1959; Tour of Ulster, 1960

Joe O'Brien is an Irish cyclist. He won the Rás Tailteann in 1959, cycling with the National Cycling Club of Dublin.
