= Ben McKenna =

Ben McKenna may refer to:

- Ben McKenna (cyclist) (1939–1992)
- Ben McKenna (footballer) (born 1993)
- Dr. Benjamin McKenna, main character in the film The Man Who Knew Too Much (1956)
- Ben McKenna, fictional character in the novel series Tales of the City
- Ben McKenna, character in the film When He's Not a Stranger
