= Mike O'Donaghue =

Irish road racing cyclist (born 1945)

Personal information
- Born: 1945 (age 80–81)

Cycling career
- Sport: Cycling
- Discipline: Road racing
- Role: Rider

Major wins
- 1st, Rás Tailteann (1973)

Mike O'Donaghue (born 1945) is a former Irish amateur road racing cyclist. O'Donaghue lived in Carlow and rode for the Carlow Team, and was one of the top amateurs in Ireland during the 1970s. His greatest win was the 1973 Rás Tailteann.
