= Paul McCormack (cyclist) =

Irish cyclist

Personal information
- Born: 26 July 1963 (age 63) Dublin, Ireland
- Height: 1.60 m (5 ft 3 in)
- Weight: 63 kg (139 lb; 9 st 13 lb)

Cycling career
- Sport: Cycling
- Current team: Retired
- Discipline: Road
- Role: Rider

Paul McCormack (born 26 July 1963) is an Irish former cyclist. He competed in the road race at the 1988 Summer Olympics.

He won the Rás Tailteann twice, in 1987 and 1988.

His older brother, Alan McCormack, was also a professional cyclist.
