= Nikolay Kosyakov =

Russian cyclist

Personal information
- Born: Taganrog, Rostov, Russian SFSR, Soviet Union

Cycling career
- Sport: Cycling
- Current team: Retired
- Discipline: Road
- Role: Rider

Amateur team
- 1982–1985: Soviet Union National Team

Nikolay Kosyakov (Russian: Николай Косяков, also Nicolai, Nikolai) is a retired Russian road cyclist. He won the 1985 Rás Tailteann, Ireland's most prestigious cycling race.

Kosyakov also competed in the 1982 Tour de l'Avenir, the 1983 World Championship amateur road race (finishing 13th), the 1983 Grand Prix Guillaume Tell (finishing sixth) and the 1985 Vuelta a España, in the first year that Soviet cyclists entered that race. In 1986 he was attending the Mykolaiv National University when he won the 160 km race at the 1986 World University Cycling Championship.
