= Jamie McGahan =

Scottish cyclist

Personal information
- Born: James McGahan; 1959 (age 66–67) Glasgow, Scotland

Sport
- Sport: Cycling
- Club: Glasgow Wheelers; Scotia Sports CC; Greenock RC

James "Jamie" McGahan (born 1959) is a Scottish cyclist.

== Early life ==
Jamie McGahan is a native of Glasgow and is a native to the Lambhill, Possil area.

== Career ==
McGahan won the Rás Tailteann in 1981, finished second in 1982 and third in 1983. Other wins include the Scottish Road Race Championships, Scottish Health Race and the Davie Bell Memorial.

He became the first Scottish rider to win the Ras Tailteann.

In 1982, McGahan represented Scotland at the Commonwealth Games in Brisbane, competing in both the individual road race and the team time trial. While he did not place in the top ten, his selection reflected his status as one of Scotland's leading road cyclists at the time

== Early Life and Club Career ==
Jamie McGahan was born in 1959 in Glasgow, Scotland. He began cycling competitively as a teenager, joining local clubs including Glasgow Wheelers, Scotia Sports CC, and Greenock RC. McGahan was known among teammates for his quiet determination, tactical intelligence, and ability to sustain high pace over long stage races.

== Rás Tailteann ==
McGahan achieved prominence in 1981 when he became the first British rider to win the Rás Tailteann, Ireland's most prestigious multi-stage race. He secured victory after a decisive performance in Stage 8, maintaining a slim lead of twelve seconds over Ireland's Aidan McKeown. He demonstrated consistent performance by finishing second in 1982 and third in 1983. Contemporary accounts note that McGahan's strategic riding and resilience in adverse weather conditions were key factors in his success.

== International Representation ==
In 1982, McGahan represented Scotland at the Commonwealth Games in Brisbane. He competed in the individual road race and the team time trial. While he did not place in the top ten, his selection reflected his status as one of Scotland's leading road cyclists during that era.

== Domestic Achievements ==
Beyond the Rás, McGahan won multiple Scottish races including the Scottish Road Race Championship, Scottish Health Race, and the Davie Bell Memorial. He was regarded as a dominant force in Scottish road racing throughout the early 1980s.

== Mentorship and Legacy ==
After retiring from competitive racing, McGahan remained active in the cycling community. He served as a mentor and team manager for Clare-based teams participating in the Rás Tailteann. McGahan is also credited with introducing his niece, Imogen Cotter, to competitive cycling; she has since become a professional rider. His influence has been recognized for fostering a multi-generational cycling legacy and inspiring both Scottish and Irish riders.

== Style and Recognition ==
McGahan was known for his climbing ability, tactical intelligence, and stamina in stage races. His 1981 Rás win is often cited as a milestone in British and Irish cycling history, paving the way for increased participation of non-Irish riders in the event. Former teammates describe him as a rider who let performance speak louder than words, earning respect for both his results and sportsmanship.

== Personal life ==
His niece, Imogen Cotter, participated in the Rás na mBan (women's race) in 2017. He now lives in Ireland with his wife and kids and mentors young Irish up and coming cyclists
