= Zbigniew Głowaty =

Polish cyclist

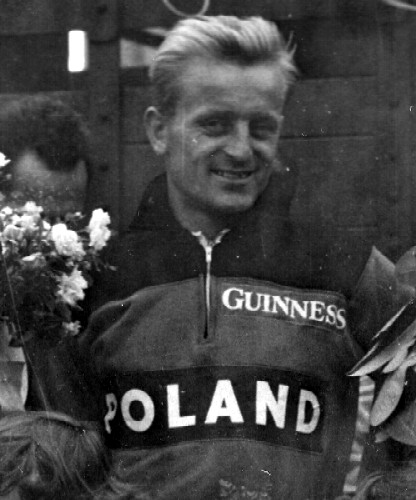
- Głowaty after winning the Rás Tailteann, 1963.

Personal information
- Born: 4 March 1932 Hnilice, Eastern Borderlands, Poland (today part of Ternopil Raion, Ternopil Oblast, Ukraine)
- Died: 20 June 2014 (aged 82)

Cycling career
- Sport: Cycling
- Discipline: Road bicycle racing
- Role: Rider

Professional team

Major wins
- Rás Tailteann, 1963

Zbigniew Głowaty ([ˈzbʲiɡ.ɲɛf ɡwɔ.ˈva.tɨ]; 4 March 1932 – 20 June 2014) was a Polish cyclist. He won the Rás Tailteann in 1963.

== Early life ==
Głowaty was born in Galicia in 1932.

== Career ==
Głowaty won the Polish Championship in track cycling in 1956. He won stages of the Tour de Pologne, finishing fourth overall in 1957. In 1963 he won the Rás Tailteann, the first foreigner to win Ireland's premier race.
