= Paul McQuaid =

Irish cyclist

Peter McQuaid
Cycling career
- Sport: Cycling
- Discipline: Road bicycle racing
- Role: Rider

Professional team
- 1989-1993, 1995: Irish National Cycling Team

Major wins
- 1st, Shay Elliott Memorial Race (1988)

Paul McQuaid is an Irish cyclist who has represented Ireland in several global competitions, as well as winning Ireland's two best known road cycling races.

== The McQuaid family and cycling ==
McQuaid comes from a road bicycle racing family, his father Jim and uncle Paddy being senior Irish amateur cyclists. His brothers Kieron and Oliver as well as his cousin John McQuaid represented Ireland in the world road championship and the Olympic road race, and Pat McQuaid is also a former president of the Union Cycliste Internationale.

== Cycling career ==
McQuaid represented Ireland in the 1989 world championships in Chambery, France. In 1991 he represented Ireland in the Hapoel Games in Israel. 1992 saw him represent Ireland in the Franco-Belge, Tour de Normandie, Tour of Europe and Giro delle Regioni in Italy. An injury knocked him out for 1993 but he came back in 1994 with rides in the Gran Premio Liberazione and Giro delle Regioni in Italy and fourth in Ireland's National Tour, the Rás Tailteann. He then made the national team for the world championship in Bogotá, Colombia in 1995. In 1995 he won the FBD Rás Tailteann. He also won race the Shay Elliott Memorial Race in 1988.

== Today ==
McQuaid was proprietor of Phoenix Park Bike Hire for eight years, and now runs River Cycles, also a bike rental shop, at Usher's Island within Dublin's South Quays. McQuaid has also run Celtic Trails cycling tours in the west of Ireland starting in 1997.
