= 2008 Tour of Ireland =

The 2008 Tour of Ireland took place between Wednesday, August 27, 2008 to Sunday, August 31, 2008.

== Stages ==
Stage	Route	Distance	Date	Winner	Team
1	Dublin–Waterford	192 km (119 mi)	Wednesday, 27 August	(United Kingdom) Mark Cavendish	Team Columbia–High Road
2	Thurles–Loughrea	158 km (98 mi)	Thursday, 28 August	(United Kingdom) Mark Cavendish	Team Columbia–High Road
3	Ballinrobe–Galway	201 km (125 mi)	Friday, 29 August	(United Kingdom) Mark Cavendish	Team Columbia–High Road
4	Limerick–Dingle	186 km (116 mi)	Saturday, 30 August	(United Kingdom) Russell Downing	Pinarello RT
5	Killarney–Cork	192 km (119 mi)	Sunday, 31 August	(Czech Republic) František Raboň	Team Columbia–High Road

== Classification ==
=== General Classification ===
Rank	Rider	Team	Time
	(Italy) Marco Pinotti	Team Columbia	21h 43' 16"
2	(United Kingdom) Russell Downing	Pinarello RT	+ 19"
3	(New Zealand) Julian Dean	Team Garmin–Chipotle	+ 21"
4	(Australia) Matt Wilson	Team Type 1	+ 33"
5	(Canada) Michael Barry	Team Columbia	+ 36"
6	(Australia) Simon Clarke	SouthAustralia.com–AIS	+ 37"
7	(Norway) Lars Petter Nordhaug	Team Joker Bianchi	+ 37″
8	(Spain) Gonzalo Rabuñal	Karpin–Galicia	+ 38″
9	(Belgium) Nikolas Maes	Topsport Vlaanderen	+ 44″
10	(South Africa) Kevin Evans	MTN Energade	+ 44″

=== Teams Classification ===
Rank	Team	Time
	(United States) Team Columbia	65h 09' 29"
2	(Italy) Tinkoff Credit Systems	+ 2' 36"
3	(Belgium) Topsport Vlaanderen	+ 3' 01"
4	SouthAustralia.com–AIS	+ 10' 24"
5	(United States) Team Type 1	+ 10' 37"
6	(Republic of Ireland) An Post–M.Donnelly–Grant Thornton–Sean Kelly	+ 12' 21"
7	(Netherlands) Rabobank	+ 12' 37"
8	(Spain) Karpin–Galicia	+ 19' 25"
9	(South Africa) MTN Energade	+ 24' 47"
10	(Norway) Team Joker Bianchi	+ 32' 07"

== Jersey Progress ==
Stage (Winner)	General Classification	Points Classification	Mountains Classification	Young Rider Classification	Team Classification
Stage 1 (Mark Cavendish)	Mark Cavendish	Alexander Kristoff	Matt Wilson	Mark Cavendish	Topsport Vlaanderen
Stage 2 (Mark Cavendish)	Mark Cavendish	Mark Cavendish	Matt Wilson	Mark Cavendish	Topsport Vlaanderen
Stage 3 (Mark Cavendish)	Mark Cavendish	Mark Cavendish	Matt Wilson	Mark Cavendish	Topsport Vlaanderen
Stage 4 (Russell Downing)	Russell Downing	Mark Cavendish	Matt Wilson	Gonzalo Rabuñal	Topsport Vlaanderen
Stage 5 (František Raboň)	Marco Pinotti	Russell Downing	Matt Wilson	Simon Clarke	Team Columbia
Final	Marco Pinotti	Russell Downing	Matt Wilson	Simon Clarke	Team Columbia
