= Pezula Racing =

Cycling team

Team information
- UCI code: PZR
- Registered: Ireland
- Founded: 2008
- Disbanded: 2008
- Disciplines: Road, track
- Status: Continental

Key personnel
- General manager: Brian O'Loughlin

Team name history
- 2008: Pezula Racing

Pezula Racing (UCI team code: PZR) were a UCI Continental cycling team registered in Ireland that participated predominantly in races on the UCI Europe Tour. The team was managed by Brian O'Loughlin with assistance from directeur sportif David McQuaid.

Their biggest wins were 2 stages in the 2008 Rás Tailteann

It was announced in July 2008 that due to economic pressures in Ireland and the downturn in the construction industry, Pezula Construction would stop the sponsorship of the team. However, the directeur sportif David McQuaid has stepped in and his company DMC Sports Ireland will take over the sponsorship of the team. This was announced while the team were racing in Quinghai Lake, China.

== Major wins ==
East Midlands International Cicle Classic, Ciarán Power
Stage 6 FBD Insurance Ras, Ciarán Power
Stage 8 FBD Insurance Ras, David O'Loughlin

== 2008 squad ==
As of 2008 season.

Rider	Date of birth
Derek Burke (IRL)	June 3, 1986 (age 40)
William Connolly (IRL)	May 31, 1989 (age 37)
Ryan Connor (GBR)	April 6, 1984 (age 42)
Fredrik Ericsson (cyclist) (SWE)
Morgan Fox (IRL)	February 19, 1974 (age 52)
Paul Healion (IRL)	June 3, 1978 (age 48)
Martyn Irvine (IRL)	June 6, 1985 (age 41)
Cameron Jennings (AUS)
David O'Loughlin (IRL)	April 29, 1978 (age 48)
Kieran Page (GBR)	May 2, 1983 (age 43)
Adam Petrie-Armstrong (IRL)	April 5, 1987 (age 39)
Ciarán Power (IRL)	May 8, 1976 (age 50)
Alexander Wetterhall (SWE)	April 12, 1986 (age 40)
