= Dermot Gilleran =

Irish cyclist

Cycling career
- Sport: Cycling
- Discipline: Road bicycle racing
- Role: Rider

Major wins
- Rás Tailteann, 1982

Dermot Gilleran is an Irish cyclist. He won the Rás Tailteann in 1982.

== Career ==
Dermot Gilleran won the Rás Tailteann in 1982.
