= Gene Mangan =

Irish cyclist (1936–2025)

Personal information
- Full name: Eugene Mangan
- Born: 16 August 1936 Killorglin, County Kerry, Ireland
- Died: 25 March 2025 (aged 88) Rathgar, Dublin, Ireland

Cycling career
- Sport: Cycling
- Discipline: Road bicycle racing
- Role: Rider

Amateur team
- 1952–: Kerry, Killorglin Cycling Club

Major wins
- Rás Tailteann, 1955

Eugene Mangan (16 August 1936 – 25 March 2025) was an Irish cyclist who won the Rás Tailteann in 1955.

== Early life ==
Mangan was born on 16 August 1936. A native of County Kerry, he was a distant cousin of John Mangan, who also won the Rás.

== Career ==
Mangan joined Killorglin Cycling Club in 1952. In that year, and in 1953, he won the County Kerry Road Championship.

Mangan won the 1955 Rás Tailteann aged 18; as of 2015 he is still the youngest-ever winner.

In 1958, Rás won the last four stages, setting a record that still stands. Mangan also won several races at the Irish National Cycling Championships.

== Personal life and death ==
Mangan married Maeve of Glenbeigh, County Kerry. He was honoured at an event at Áras an Uachtaráin in 2000.

Mangan died at Orwell Nursing Home, Rathgar, on 25 March 2025, at the age of 88. He was survived by his wife.
