= Dungarvan =

Town in County Waterford, Ireland

Dungarvan Dún Garbhán (Irish)
- Town
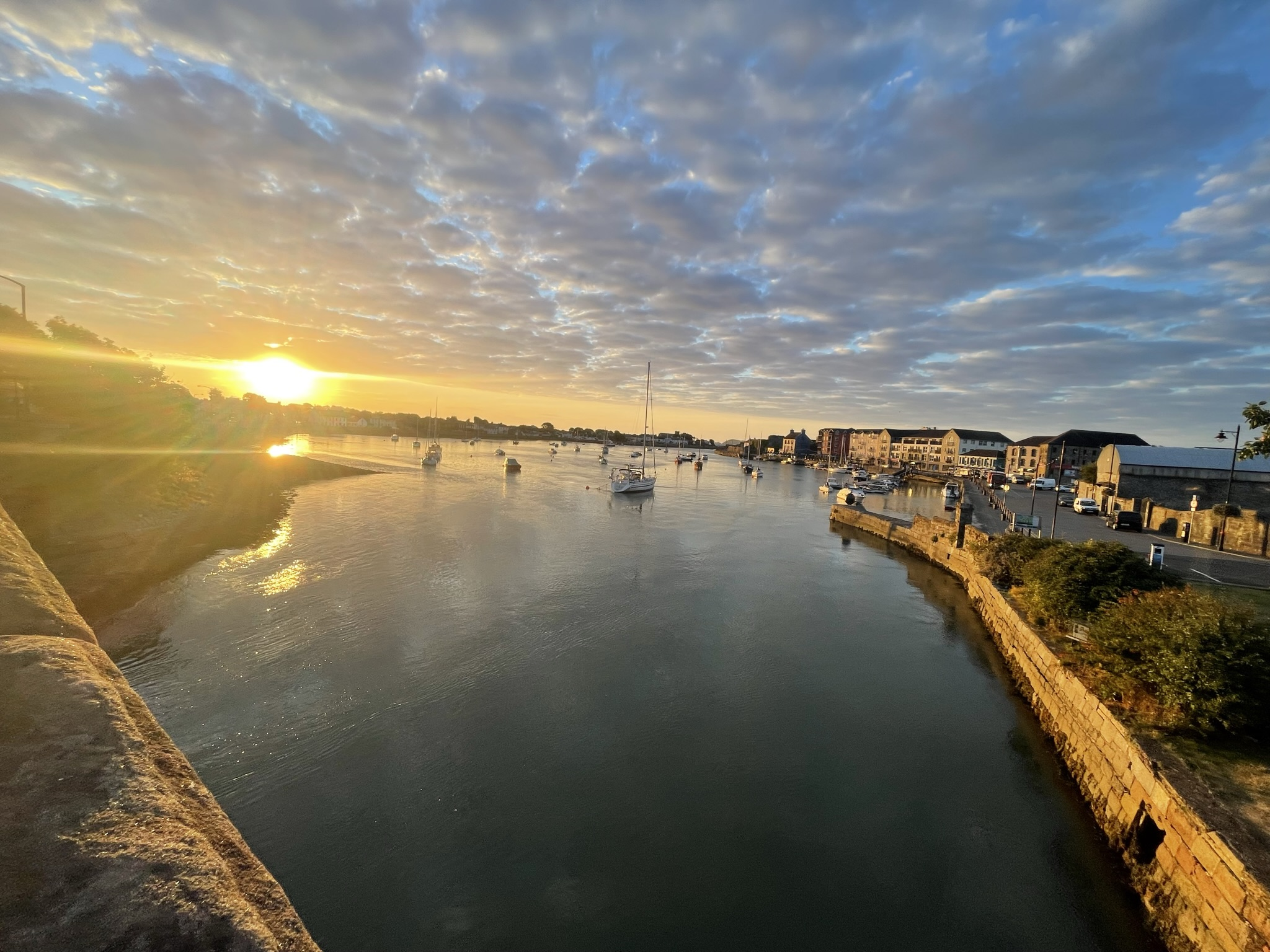
- Dungarvan's harbour

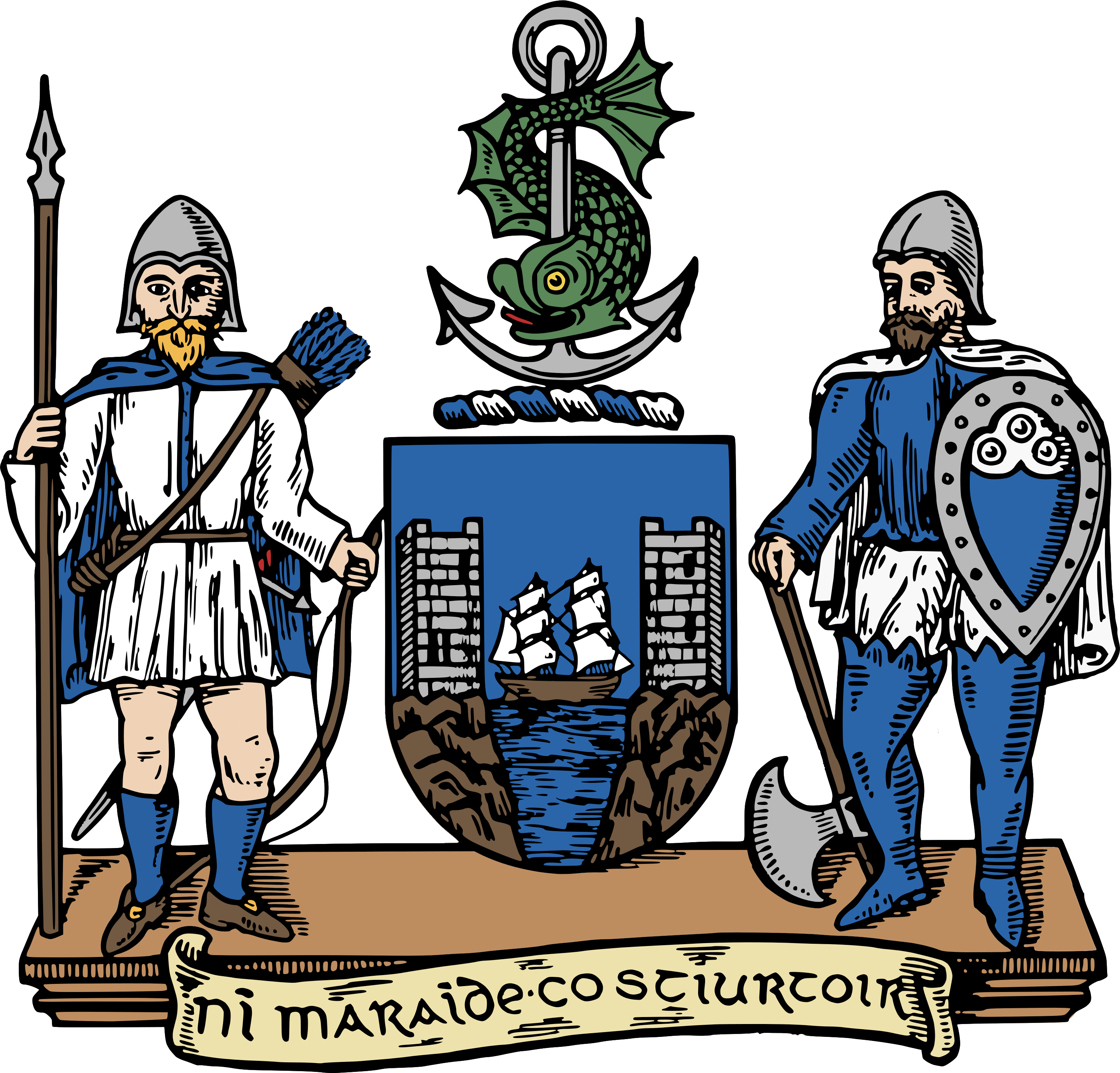
- Coat of arms
- Motto: Ní Maraidhe Go Stiúrthóir; Can't Have a Mariner Without a Steersman
- Location in Ireland
- Coordinates: 52.0845°N 7.6397°W
- Country: Ireland
- Province: Munster
- County: Waterford

Area
  - Total: 4.63 km^{2} (1.79 sq mi)
- Elevation: 1 m (3.3 ft)

Population (2022)
  - Total: 10,081
- Time zone: UTC±0 (WET)
  - Summer (DST): UTC+1 (IST)
- Eircode routing key: X35
- Telephone area code: +353(0)58
- Irish Grid Reference: X259930
- Website: waterfordcouncil.ie/our-county/dungarvan

Dungarvan (Irish: Dún Garbhán, meaning 'Garbhann's fort') is a coastal town and harbour in County Waterford, on the south-east coast of Ireland. Prior to the merger of Waterford County Council with Waterford City Council in 2014, Dungarvan was the county town and administrative centre of County Waterford. Waterford City and County Council retains administrative offices in the town. The town is in a townland and civil parish of the same name.

Dungarvan's Irish name means 'Garbhann's fort', referring to Saint Garbhann who founded a church there in the seventh century. The town had a population of 10,081 at the 2022 census, making it the third most populous in the county.

== Location and access ==
The town lies on the N25 road (European route E30), which connects Cork, Waterford and Rosslare Europort. It is around 40 kilometres (25 mi) south-west of Waterford and 60 kilometres (37 mi) north-east of Cork.

Dungarvan is situated at the mouth of the Colligan River, which divides the town into two parishes - that of Dungarvan to the west, and that of Abbeyside to the east. These parishes are connected in three places by a causeway and single-span bridge built by the Dukes of Devonshire starting in 1801; by an old railway bridge; and by a ring-road causeway and bridge.

== History ==
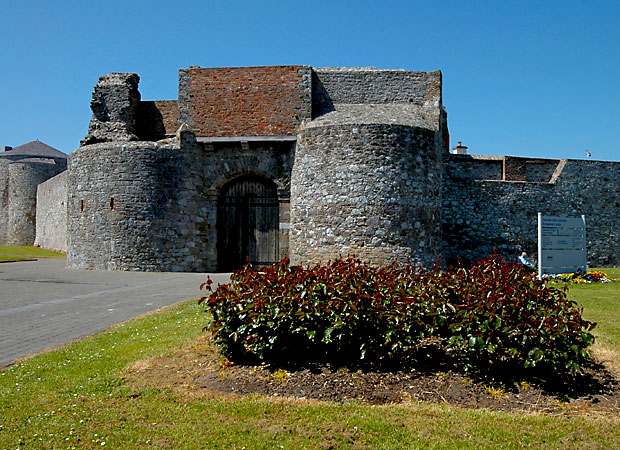
Dungarvan Castle dates to at least the early 13th century

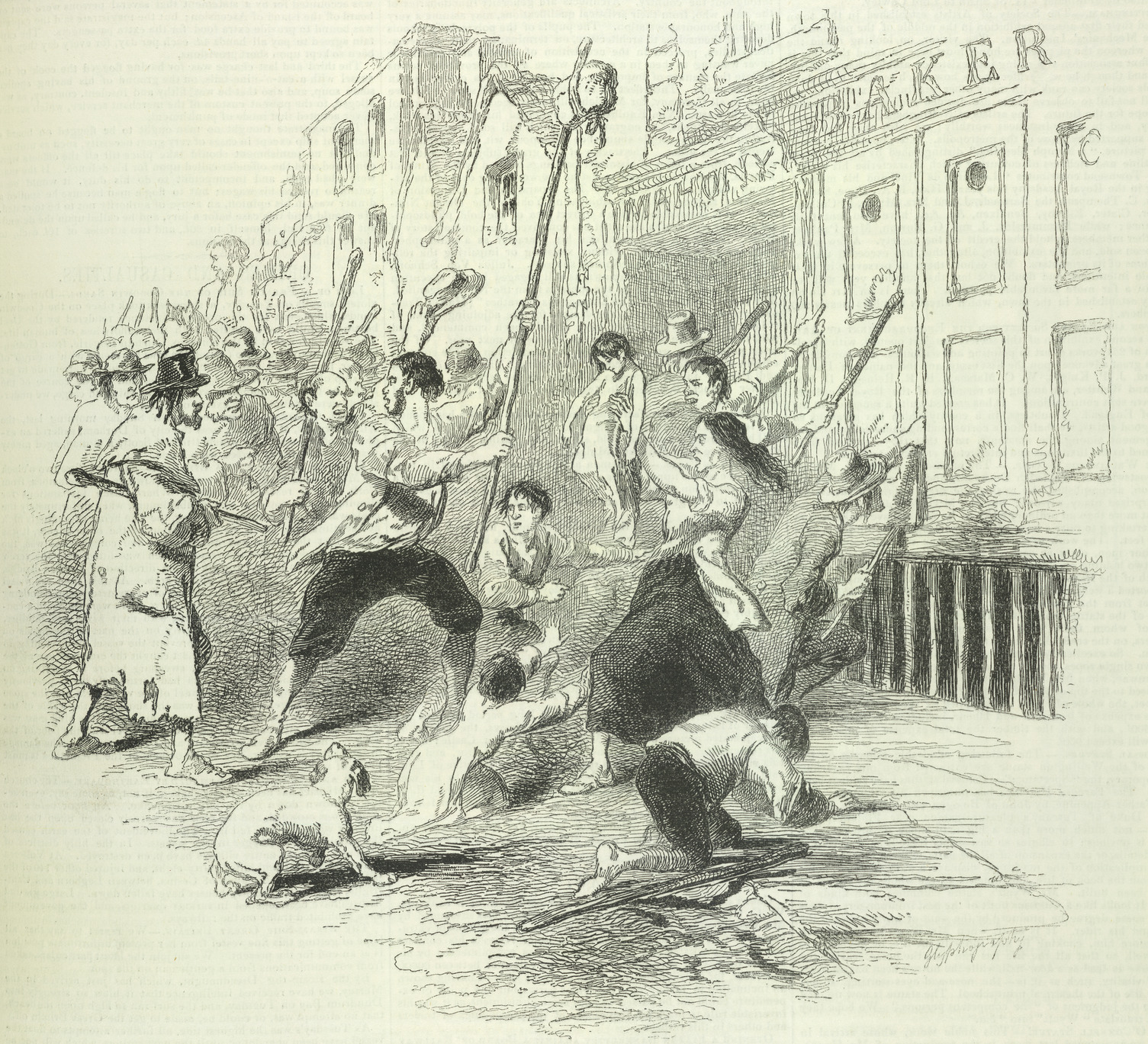
Food riot in Dungarvan during the Great Famine. (The Pictorial Times, 1846)

Evidence of ancient settlement in the Dungarvan area includes standing stone, ringfort, bullaun and reputed paleolithic burial sites in the surrounding townlands, including in Luskanargid, Kilgreany, Kilrush and Mapestown. Several sources propose that the town is of Viking origin, and evidence of Hiberno-Norse settlement in the area dates to at least the 10th century.

The Anglo-Norman Dungarvan Castle, commissioned in the late 12th or early 13th century by King John of England, stands by the harbour on the site of an earlier (possibly Hiberno-Norse) fortification. The structure of Dungarvan Castle, including a shell keep of a type atypical in Ireland, dates to c.1209.

A 13th century Augustinian abbey, now the site of Saint Augustine's Catholic Church (built 1832), was founded by Thomas FitzMaurice FitzGerald (c.1145–1213). The remains of another 13th century church, on the opposite side of the harbour, are similarly found on the grounds of Saint Mary's church (built 1831).

The town of Dungarvan was incorporated in the 15th century, was represented by two members in the Irish Parliament until the Act of Union in 1801, and returned one member to the Westminster Parliament until 1885. Unlike nearby Waterford and Duncannon, Dungarvan surrendered without a siege in the Cromwellian conquest of Ireland (1649–53).

The remains of a woolly mammoth were discovered in the town in 1859 by postmaster and amateur antiquarian Edward Brenan.

The Royal National Lifeboat Institution opened Dungarvan Lifeboat Station in 1859. It was moved to Ballinacourty in 1862 and then to Crow's Point at Helvick in 1899. The station was closed in 1969 but a new Helvick Head Lifeboat Station was established in 1997.

The 1921 Burgery ambush, an incident in the Irish War of Independence, took place near the town.

== Irish language ==
As of the 2011 census, approximately 3% of the town's population, or 242 persons were then daily Irish speakers, outside of the education system. Irish language immersion education is available at pre-school and primary school level in Dungarvan's Gaelscoil, Scoil Garbhán. The Irish Language Officer of Waterford City and County Council is based in Dungarvan.

There are a range of activities and projects undertaken to strengthen the Irish language in the town. An Irish in Business award was established in 2009 to recognise businesses in Dungarvan and West Waterford who work to promote the Irish language.

The town is home to an office of Glór na nGael, a national body that promotes the Irish language in three areas, the language in the family, in Business and enterprise, and community development. The Dungarvan office is responsible for Glór na nGael's work across South Leinster and most of Munster.

There is also contact between the town and the nearby Gaeltacht area of Ring, County Waterford and Old Parish which make up Gaeltacht na nDéise. Dungarvan was identified as a potential Gaeltacht Service Town under the Gaeltacht Act 2012.

== Geography ==
Dungarvan is situated at the mouth of the Colligan River. Dungarvan Harbour as such is formed by The Quay (on the town side) and The Causeway. A single-span bridge was built in the late 18th century by Lord Devonshire to link Dungarvan with Abbeyside and indeed Waterford via said causeway. Outside the harbour, a 3-kilometre (1.9 mi) sandbar, "The Cunnigar" (Irish An Coinigéar) defines the western limit of the 4-kilometre (2.5 mi) wide Dungarvan Bay. The Cunnigar encloses the estuary of the River Brickey which flows out to sea at Abbeyside without actually joining the Colligan. The two estuaries are separated by "The Point".

Historical population
Year	Pop.	±%
1813	4,930	—
1821	5,105	+3.5%
1831	6,527	+27.9%
1841	8,625	+32.1%
1851	6,865	−20.4%
1861	5,886	−14.3%
1871	6,520	+10.8%
1881	6,306	−3.3%
1891	5,263	−16.5%
1901	4,850	−7.8%
1911	4,977	+2.6%
1926	5,207	+4.6%
1936	5,361	+3.0%
1946	5,276	−1.6%
1951	5,423	+2.8%
1956	5,394	−0.5%
1961	5,188	−3.8%
1966	5,380	+3.7%
1971	5,583	+3.8%
1981	6,631	+18.8%
1986	6,849	+3.3%
1991	6,920	+1.0%
1996	7,175	+3.7%
2002	7,452	+3.9%
2006	8,362	+12.2%
2011	9,427	+12.7%
2016	9,227	−2.1%
2022	10,081	+9.3%

== Religion ==
A friary in Abbeyside, founded by the Augustinians in the 13th century, is partially incorporated with the structure of a 20th-century Roman Catholic church. One of the most significant colleges in the town was also founded by these Augustinians, whose order remains active locally and maintains a parish church nearer to Main Street.

== Toponymy ==
In everyday local usage, "Dungarvan" is taken to refer to the western, more commercial half of the town, where the administrative buildings and shopping areas are situated.

== Transport ==
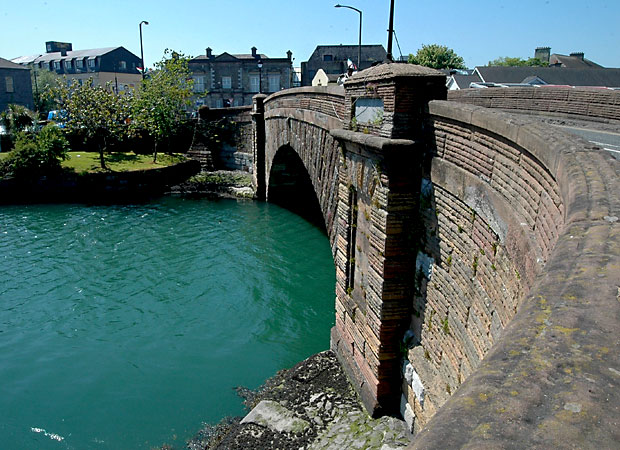
Devonshire Bridge

=== Road ===
Dungarvan is on the N25 national primary road and the R672 and R675 regional roads.

=== Maritime ===
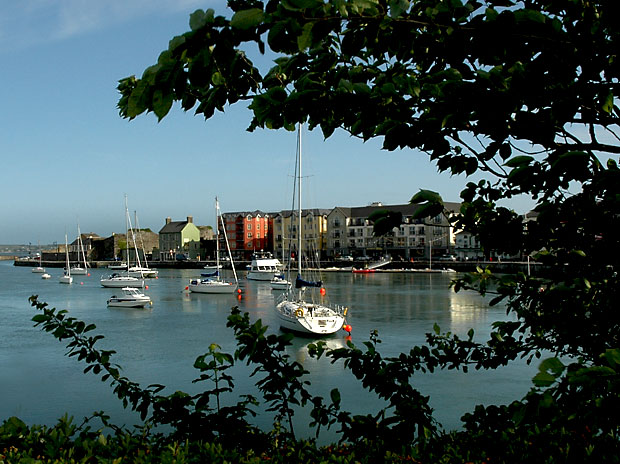
Dungarvan harbour

The town is separated from the open ocean by a shallow, eastward-facing bay. At its mouth, the bay is about two miles wide, with Dungarvan lying about four miles from the mouth. A meandering navigation channel marked by red/green buoys leads into Dungarvan from the ocean. For most vessels (except small dinghies) this channel is not navigable at low tide. Even at high tide, cruising yachts and larger vessels must be careful to remain in the buoyed channel. There is a concrete slipway in Dungarvan town, suitable for launching vessels up to eight metres in length.

=== Bus ===
Dungarvan is served by several bus routes. The Cork to London Eurolines coach, which provides a daily overnight cross channel service, stops at Dungarvan. Bus Éireann Expressway route number 40 runs hourly in each direction providing a link to Cork, Waterford and Rosslare Europort. Bus Éireann's route number 362 also provides a commuter link to Waterford. Several Local Link bus services terminate in the town, including the service to Tallow via Lismore. Dublin Coach serve the town on its M9 Cork to Dublin route via Waterford, passing through every two hours.

=== Rail ===
Until 1967, Dungarvan had a railway station on the now dismantled Mallow to Waterford line and was served by the Rosslare to Cork boat train. The Waterford Greenway has been developed along the former line to Waterford since 2017.

== Local government ==
While there is evidence of local governance in Dungarvan from at least the 15th century, the historic corporation was extinct before the Acts of Union 1800. A board of town commissioners was established in 1855. Following the passing of the Local Government (Ireland) Act 1898, the local authority became an urban district council in 1899. It became a town council in 2002. In common with all other town councils in Ireland, it was abolished under the Local Government Reform Act 2014.

The local electoral area (LEA) of Dungarvan elects six councillors to Waterford City and County Council. With the three-seat LEA of Lismore, it forms the Municipal District of Dungarvan—Lismore. Meetings of the Dungarvan—Lismore District Council are held in the Civic Offices, Dungarvan.

== Industry ==
As of 2022, the consumer products company Haleon (previously part of GSK) had a manufacturing plant in Dungarvan which then employed approximately 900 people. The town is also the home of Radley Engineering, the company responsible for manufacturing the Spire of Dublin. Dungarvan previously had a tannery, a distillery, a gasworks, and a fishing fleet. In the later 20th century, a source of trade and employment was Dungarvan Cooperative (creamery), which connected the town of Dungarvan with its agricultural hinterland.

== International relations ==
=== Twin towns and sister cities ===
Dungarvan has been twinned with Erie, Pennsylvania in the US since March 2007.

Mercyhurst University, located in Erie, has hosted a bi-annual Global Intelligence Forum in Dungarvan. Each spring, Mercyhurst students and faculty also spend a term in Dungarvan as part of MU's 'study abroad' scheme. MU's base in Dungarvan includes its European Centre for Intelligence Research, Analytics and Training.

=== Entente Florale ===
Dungarvan participated in the 2018 Entente Florale competition, organised by the European Association for Flowers and Landscape (AEFP), and received a silver medal.

== Literature ==
Tadhg Gaelach Ó Súilleabháin (c. 1715 – 1795), a composer of 18th century Irish bardic poetry, lived in Dungarvan for several years. While there, he experienced a religious conversion and subsequently wrote mainly Christian poetry in Munster Irish.

The British poet laureate, Sir John Betjeman (who lived in Ireland from 1941 to 1943) mentions Dungarvan in his poem, "The Irish Unionist's Farewell to Greta Hellstrom". Each stanza closes with the line, "Dungarvan in the rain". Irish poet Mai O'Higgins was born on Saint Mary Street in the town centre.

Dungarvan is referred to in the collection of short stories Labyrinths by Jorge Luis Borges: In The Shape of the Sword, the protagonist notes, "He was Irish, from Dungarvan. Having said this, he stopped short, as if he had revealed a secret". Dungarvan is also mentioned in the 2002 novel The Story of Lucy Gault by William Trevor.

== People ==
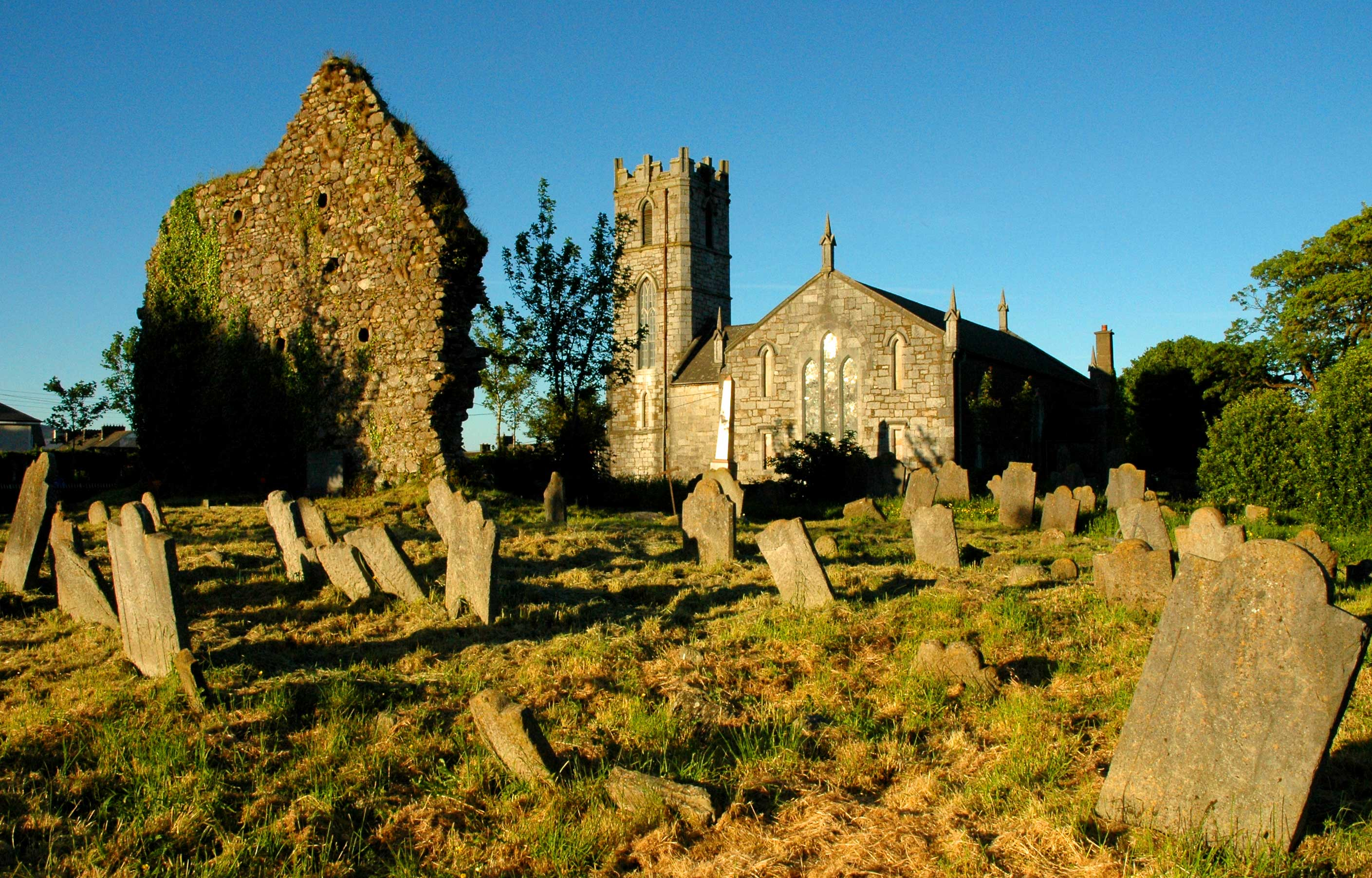
Church and old cemetery in Dungarvan

- Niamh Briggs, rugby player
- Tom Cunningham, hurler
- John Deasy, politician
- Austin Deasy, politician
- Maura Derrane, television presenter and journalist
- Moe Dunford, actor
- George Lennon, Irish Republican Army leader
- Michael Lyster, television presenter and broadcaster
- Christy Moylan, hurler
- Tadhg Gaelach Ó Súilleabháin Timothy O'Sullivan (c. 1715 – 1795), bard in Munster Irish
- Robert Power, cyclist
- Tom Queally, jockey
- Stephen Spratt, cyclist
- Ernest Walton, physicist and Nobel laureate

== See also ==
- List of towns and villages in Ireland
- Market Houses in Ireland
