= Rás Tailteann =

Irish international cycling stage race

Race details
- Date: Late May
- Region: Ireland
- Nickname: The Rás
- Discipline: Road
- Competition: UCI Europe Tour (2005–2018); National calendar (2022–)
- Type: Stage race
- Organiser: Cairde Rás Tailteann
- Race director: Gerard Campbell
- Web site: www.anpostras.ie

History
- First edition: 1953
- Editions: 68 (as of 2023)
- First winner: Colm Christle (IRL)
- Most wins: Sé O'Hanlon (IRL) (4 wins)
- Most recent: Dom Jackson (GBR)

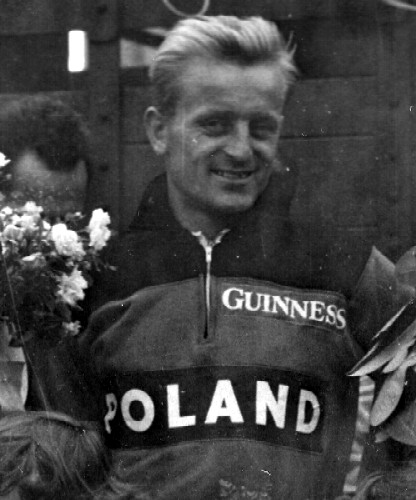
Zbigniew Głowaty, pictured after winning the 1963 Rás

Rás Tailteann (pronounced [ˌɾˠaːsˠ ˈt̪ˠal̠ʲtʲən̪ˠ]; "Tailteann Race"), often shortened to the Rás, is an annual international cycling stage race, held in Ireland. Traditionally held in May, the race returned after a hiatus in 2022 as a five-day event held in June. By naming the race Rás Tailteann the original organisers, members of the National Cycling Association (NCA), were associating the cycle race with the Tailteann Games, a Gaelic festival in early medieval Ireland.

The event was founded by Joe Christle in 1953 and was organised under the rules of the National Cycling Association (NCA). At that time competitive cycling in Ireland was deeply divided between three cycling organisations, the NCA, Cumann Rothaiochta na hÉireann (CRÉ) and the Northern Ireland Cycling Federation (NICF). The Rás Tailteann was the biggest race that the NCA organised each year.

As a result of a Union Cycliste Internationale (UCI) motion, the NCA was banned from international races and all teams affiliated with the UCI were banned from competing in races organised by the NCA. Therefore, only teams that were not affiliated with the UCI or who were willing to take the chance of serving a suspension for competing in the Rás Tailteann competed in the Rás Tailteann. During this time the NCA cyclists achieved prominence in the Rás with Gene Mangan, Sé O'Hanlon and Paddy Flanagan being several legends of the race. Mangan won only one Rás but featured in the race throughout the 1960s and early-1970s winning a total of 12 stages while O'Hanlon won the race four times and won 24 stages. Flanagan won the Rás three times and had 11 stage wins.

The NCA and the CRÉ together with NICF began unification talks in the late 1960s and early 1970s. As a result, a CRÉ team which included Pat McQuaid, Kieron McQuaid, Peter Morton and Peter Doyle was able to enter the race in 1974. Doyle won the race and the McQuaids won two stages each. The first Rás open to the two associations CRÉ and the NICF was in 1979 and enabled Stephen Roche to compete the event as part of the Ireland team. Roche won the event.

The race developed into a much sought after event by professional and amateur teams from many parts of the world. As part of the elite international calendar it was eligible to award qualifying points that are required for participation in Olympic Games and the UCI Road World Championships.

The first edition was held in 1953 as a two-day event but quickly developed into a week-long event. It ran every year, uninterrupted, until 2018. Following Cumann Rás Tailteann's failure to find a new principal sponsor for the race, it was announced in February 2019 that there would be no Rás that year.

The race was a UCI 2.2 event.

The race returned in 2022.

== History ==
The official name of the race has been changed many times over the years, usually named after sponsors. An Post were the last title sponsors, although this sponsorship ended after the 2017 event.

=== Race names ===
- 1953 to 1967: Rás Tailteann
- 1968 to 1972: You Are Better Off Saving Rás Tailteann
- 1973: Tayto Rás Tailteann
- 1974 to 1976: Discover Ireland Rás Tailteann
- 1977 to 1980: The Health Race Rás Tailteann
- 1981 to 1982: Tirolia Rás Tailteann
- 1983: Dairy Rás Tailteann
- 1984 to 2004: FBD Milk Rás
- 2005 to 2010: FBD Insurance Rás
- 2011 to 2017: An Post Rás
- 2018 to date: Rás Tailteann

=== Past winners ===
No.	Year	GC Winner	Nationality	Team	Points class	KOM	U23
1	1953	Colm Christle	Ireland	James' Gate C.C.			
2	1954	Joe O'Brien	Ireland	National C.C.			
3	1955	Gene Mangan	Ireland	Kerry			
4	1956	Paudie Fitzgerald	Ireland	Kerry			
5	1957	Frank Ward	Ireland	Dublin			
6	1958	Mick Murphy	Ireland	Kerry			
7	1959	Ben McKenna	Ireland	Meath			
8	1960	Paddy Flanagan	Ireland	Kildare			
9	1961	Tom Finn	Ireland	Dublin Team		Seán Dillon (Republic of Ireland)	
10	1962	Sé O'Hanlon	Ireland	Dublin			
11	1963	Zbigniew Głowaty	Poland	Poland			
12	1964	Paddy Flanagan (2)	Ireland	Kildare			
13	1965	Sé O'Hanlon (2)	Ireland	Dublin			
14	1966	Sé O'Hanlon (3)	Ireland	Dublin			
15	1967	Sé O'Hanlon (4)	Ireland	Dublin			
16	1968	Milan Hrazdíra	Czechoslovakia	Czechoslovakia			
17	1969	Brian Connaughton	Ireland	Meath			
18	1970	Aleksandr Gusyatnikov	Soviet Union	U.S.S.R.			
19	1971	Colm Nulty	Ireland	Meath			
20	1972	John Mangan	Ireland	Kerry			
21	1973	Mike O'Donaghue	Ireland	Carlow			
22	1974	Peter Doyle	Ireland	I.C.F.			
23	1975	Paddy Flanagan (3)	Ireland	Kildare			
24	1976	Fons Steuten	Netherlands	Netherlands			
25	1977	Yuri Lavrushkin	Soviet Union	U.S.S.R.			
26	1978	Séamus Kennedy	Ireland	Kerry			
27	1979	Stephen Roche	Ireland	Ireland			
28	1980	Billy Kerr	Ireland	Ireland			
29	1981	Jamie McGahan	United Kingdom	Scotland			
30	1982	Dermot Gilleran	Ireland	Ireland			
31	1983	Philip Cassidy	Ireland	Ireland			
32	1984	Stephen Delaney	Ireland	Dublin			
33	1985	Nikolay Kosyakov	Soviet Union				
34	1986	Stephen Spratt	Ireland	Ireland			
35	1987	Paul McCormack	Ireland	Longford			
36	1988	Paul McCormack (2)	Ireland	Ireland			
37	1989	Dainis Ozols	Soviet Union				
38	1990	Ian Chivers	Ireland	Ireland			
39	1991	Kevin Kimmage	Ireland	Meath			
40	1992	Stephen Spratt (2)	Ireland	Dublin			
41	1993	Éamonn Byrne	Ireland	Dublin Wheelers			
42	1994	Declan Lonergan	Ireland	Ireland			
43	1995	Paul McQuaid	Ireland	Ireland			
44	1996	Tommy Evans	Ireland	Armagh			
45	1997	Andrew Roche	Isle of Man	Kerry			
46	1998	Ciarán Power	Ireland	Team Ireland			
47	1999	Philip Cassidy (2)	Ireland	Team Ireland			
48	2000	Julian Winn	United Kingdom	Wales team	David McCann (Republic of Ireland)	David McCann (Republic of Ireland)	
49	2001	Paul Manning	United Kingdom	Great Britain team	David Kopp (Germany)	Nicholas White (South Africa)	
50	2002	Ciarán Power (2)	Ireland	Team Ireland-Stena Line	Chris Newton (United Kingdom)	Julian Winn (United Kingdom)	
51	2003	Chris Newton	United Kingdom	Great Britain team	Jonas Holmkvist (Sweden)	Maxim Iglinsky (Kazakhstan)	
52	2004	David McCann	Ireland	Ireland-Thornton's Recycling Team	Malcolm Elliott (United Kingdom)	Tobias Lergard (Sweden)	
53	2005	Chris Newton (2)	United Kingdom	Recycling.co.uk	Malcolm Elliott (United Kingdom)	Mark Lovatt (United Kingdom)	
54	2006	Kristian House	United Kingdom	Recycling.co.uk	Morten Hegreberg (Norway)	Ciarán Power (Republic of Ireland)	
55	2007	Tony Martin	Germany	Thüringer Energie Team	Dominique Rollin (Canada)	Ricardo Van der Velde (Netherlands)	
56	2008	Stephen Gallagher	Ireland	An Post–Sean Kelly	Dean Downing (United Kingdom)	Kit Gilham (United Kingdom)	
57	2009	Simon Richardson	United Kingdom	Rapha Condor–recycling.co.uk	Niko Eeckhout (Belgium)	David O'Loughlin (Republic of Ireland)	Mark McNally (United Kingdom)
58	2010	Alexander Wetterhall	Sweden	Team Sprocket Pro	John Degenkolb (Germany)	Mark Cassidy (Republic of Ireland)	Connor McConvey (Republic of Ireland)
59	2011	Gediminas Bagdonas	Lithuania	An Post–Sean Kelly	Shane Archbold (New Zealand)	Oleksandr Sheydyk (Ukraine)	Aaron Gate (New Zealand)
60	2012	Nicolas Baldo	France	Atlas Personal–Jakroo	Gediminas Bagdonas (Lithuania)	David Clarke (United Kingdom)	Richard Handley (United Kingdom)
61	2013	Marcin Białobłocki	Poland	Team UK Youth	Owain Doull (United Kingdom)	Martin Hunal (Czech Republic)	Simon Yates (United Kingdom)
62	2014	Clemens Fankhauser	Austria	Tirol Cycling Team	Patrick Bevin (New Zealand)	Markus Eibegger (Austria)	Alex Peters (United Kingdom)
63	2015	Lukas Pöstlberger	Austria	Tirol Cycling Team	Aaron Gate (New Zealand)	Aidis Kruopis (Lithuania)	Ryan Mullen (Republic of Ireland)
64	2016	Clemens Fankhauser (2)	Austria	Tirol Cycling Team	Aaron Gate (New Zealand)	Nikodemus Holler (Germany)	Jai Hindley (Australia)
65	2017	James Gullen	United Kingdom	JLT–Condor	Daan Meijers (Netherlands)	Przemysław Kasperkiewicz (Poland)	Michael O'Loughlin (Republic of Ireland)
66	2018	Luuc Bugter	Netherlands	Delta Cycling Rotterdam	Luuc Bugter (Netherlands)	Lukas Rüegg (Switzerland)	Robbe Ghys (Belgium)
67	2022	Daire Feeley	Ireland	All Human–VeloRevolution	Rory Townsend (Republic of Ireland)	Dean Harvey (Republic of Ireland)	Louis Sutton (United Kingdom)
68	2023	Dillon Corkery	Ireland	Team Ireland (CC Étupes)	Matthew Fox (Australia)	Conor McGoldrick (United Kingdom)	Aaron Wade (Republic of Ireland)
69	2024	Dom Jackson	United Kingdom	Foran CT	Tim Shoreman (United Kingdom)	Dean Harvey (Republic of Ireland)	Liam O'Brien (Republic of Ireland)
70	2025	George Kimber	United Kingdom	CC Isle of Man (Spirit Racing Team)	Odhran Doogan (Republic of Ireland)	Adam Lewis (United Kingdom)	Jamie Meehan (Republic of Ireland)

== Bibliography ==
- Daly, Tom (2003). The Rás – The Story of Ireland's Unique Bike Race. The Collins Press. ISBN 1-903464-37-4.
- Daly, Tom (2012). The Rás – The Story of Ireland's Unique Bike Race – paperback edition. The Collins Press. ISBN 978-1-84889-148-7.
- Traynor, Jim (2008). The Rás – A Day by Day Diary of Ireland's Great Bike Race. The Collins Press. ISBN 978-1-905451-71-5.
- Riordan, Christy (2009). A Special tribute to Mick Murphy: Winner of 1958 Rás Tailteann. C.R. DVD & Video production.
