= Stephen Delaney =

Irish cyclist

Personal information
- Born: 1962/63 Sutton, Dublin, Ireland
- Died: 2026/08/26 Castleknock, Dublin

Cycling career
- Sport: Cycling
- Discipline: Road bicycle racing
- Role: Rider

Major wins
- Rás Tailteann, 1984

Stephen Delaney (born 1962/63) is an Irish cyclist. He won the Rás Tailteann in 1984.

== Career ==
Stephen Delaney won the 1984 Rás Tailteann.

== Personal and later life ==
Delaney is a triathlon coach.
