= Colm Christle =

Irish cyclist (c.1933–2018)

Personal information
- Full name: Colm Christle
- Born: c. 1933 Dublin
- Died: 28 October 2018 Dublin

Cycling career
- Sport: Cycling
- Role: Rider

Amateur team
- James’s Gate Cycling Club

Major wins
- Rás Tailteann, 1953

Colm Christle (c. 1933 – 28 October 2018) was an Irish cyclist. He was most famous for winning the first Rás Tailteann, in 1953.

== Early life ==
Colm Christle was born in Dublin. He worked for the Dublin Corporation and provided legal advice for the Electricity Supply Board.

== Career ==
Christle did not learn to cycle until he was 17. He cycled with the James's Gate Cycling Club. At 19 he won the O'Dowd Cup, a Dublin–Drogheda race. Christle won the 100-mile men's road race at the Irish National Cycling Championships in 1953 and 1954. In 1953 he won the inaugural Rás Tailteann. The demands of his legal studies caused Christle to retire from cycling in 1958.

== Later life ==
Christle became a barrister. He married Anna Callanan and had five children. He died on 28 October 2018.
