= Frank Ward (cyclist) =

Irish cyclist (born 1930)

Personal information
- Born: 23 July 1930 (age 96) Dublin, Irish Free State

Cycling career
- Sport: Cycling
- Discipline: Road bicycle racing
- Role: Rider

Amateur team
- Harp Cycling Club

Major wins
- Rás Tailteann, 1957

Frank Ward (born 23 July 1930) is an Irish retired cyclist. He won the Rás Tailteann in 1957.

== Early life ==
Ward is a native of Dublin.

== Career ==
Ward won the Junior Men's race at the 1952 Irish National Cycling Championships.

Ward was second in the 1956 Rás and won it in 1957. That year, he also won three stages (of eight) and was on the winning Dublin team. He also won the 1957 Rás Cathal Brugha.
