= Mick Murphy (cyclist) =

Irish cyclist

Personal information
- Nicknames: The Iron Man; Mile-a-minute Murphy; Iron Mike
- Born: 28 April 1934 Sugrenna, Cahirsiveen, County Kerry, Irish Free State
- Died: 10 September 2015 (aged 81) Sugrenna, Cahirsiveen, County Kerry, Ireland

Cycling career
- Sport: Cycling
- Discipline: Road bicycle racing
- Role: Cycle rider

Amateur team
- 1957–1960: Castleisland Cycling Club and Kerry Team in Rás Tailteann

Major wins
- Rás Tailteann, 1958

Michael Murphy (28 April 1934 – 10 September 2015) was an Irish cyclist. He won the Rás Tailteann in 1958.

== Early life ==
Murphy was a native of Cahirsiveen. He left school at 11 and initially worked variously as a farm labourer, a quarryman and a turf-cutter.

== Career ==
Murphy was later a cyclist, wrestler, boxer, runner, farmer, circus performer, fire eater, ventriloquist and bricklayer. He was nicknamed "the Iron Man".

In 1958 he won the Rás Tailteann, winning one stage. He won two stages in 1959 and was third in 1960.

He lived in England in the 1960s, competing as a wrestler. He later worked as a builder in Germany before a fall from scaffolding left him injured.

Murphy was known for his eccentricity, and was the subject of several works: an RTÉ radio documentary, A Convict of the Road; a documentary short made for the Killorglin Archive Society called The Marvels of Mick Murphy; a play based on his life by Roddy McDevitt, and a character based on him in Jane Urquhart's novel The Night Stages. He trained by sleeping in hay barns, eating raw meat and drinking cow's blood, doing the last in imitation of the Maasai. He could also walk long distances uphill on his hands.

== Personal life ==
Murphy came home to Cahirsiveen, living a frugal life on his parents' 2 acres (0.81 ha) farm, without running water or windows. He never married and had no children.

He was robbed in his home in 2012. He died in 2015.

== Legacy ==
In July 2026, a Mark Rode sculpture of Murphy was installed in Cahersiveen on July 18, 2026. The driving force behind this tribute was local man, Mike Greaney, and an address was given by Tom Daly, author of 'The Rás: the Story of Ireland's Unique Bike Race'.
