= Brian Connaughton (cyclist) =

Irish cyclist

Personal information
- Born: 1942/43 Dublin

Cycling career
- Sport: Cycling
- Role: Rider

Amateur teams
- White Cross Road Club
- Navan Road Club
- Meath
- Garda Cycling Club
- Dunboyne Cycling Club

Major wins
- Rás Tailteann, 1969; Tour of Ulster, 1971

Brian Connaughton (born 25 January 1943 in County Cavan, Ireland) is an Irish cyclist. He won the Rás Tailteann in 1969.

== Early life ==
Connaughton is a native of County Meath and was a member of the Garda Síochána (Irish police).

== Career ==
Connaughton began cycling competitively in 1962 and first competed in the Rás Tailteann in 1966. He won it in 1969 with five minutes to spare.

He also won the 1971 Tour of Ulster. In 1981, he raced his last Rás, earning his only stage win in that year.

== Later life ==
In 1984 he opened the Cycleways shop with Philip Cassidy, another Rás winner. In 1993, they founded Base Active Distribution Ltd.

Connaughton later managed the Meath Lee Strand Team.
