= Ben McKenna (cyclist) =

Irish cyclist (1939–1992)

Personal information
- Nickname: Gentle Ben
- Born: 1939 Stamullen, County Meath, Republic of Ireland
- Died: March 26, 1992 (age 52) Templemore, County Tipperary, Ireland

Cycling career
- Sport: Cycling
- Discipline: Road bicycle racing
- Role: Rider

Amateur team
- 1955–77: St. Patrick's East Meath

Major wins
- Rás Tailteann, 1959; Tour of Ulster, 1960

Ben McKenna (1939 – 26 March 1992) was an Irish cyclist. He won the Rás Tailteann in 1959.

== Early life ==
McKenna was born at Cottage Hill, Stamullen in 1939; his family later moved to Julianstown.

== Career ==
McKenna was a founding member of St. Patrick's East Meath cycling club in 1955.

He first competed in the Rás Tailteann in 1956, and won the competition in 1959. He finished second in 1961 and 1964.

McKenna also won the Rás Laighean in 1958, the Mick Beggan Memorial in 1959 and the Tour of Ulster in 1960. He retired from cycling in 1977.

== Personal and later life ==
McKenna was Chief Commissaire for the 1983 Rás. He also had a role in the reunification of the politically divided Irish cycling world, which culminated in the creation of Cycling Ireland in 1987.

McKenna married Grace Bosonnet and had six children; he died in 1992 aged just 52.

== Legacy ==
The Ben McKenna Memorial is an annual cycling race held in Balbriggan.

McKenna was inducted into the Cycling Ireland Hall of Fame in 2017.
