= Stephen Spratt =

Irish cyclist

Personal information
- Born: 25 April 1966 (age 60)

Cycling career
- Sport: Cycling

Stephen Spratt (born 25 April 1966) is an Irish former cyclist. He was born in Dungarvan.

He competed in the team time trial at the 1988 Summer Olympics.
