= Tom Finn (cyclist) =

Irish cyclist

Personal information
- Born: Ireland

Cycling career
- Sport: Cycling
- Discipline: Road bicycle racing
- Role: Rider

Major wins
- Rás Tailteann, 1961

Tom Finn is an Irish cyclist. He won the Rás Tailteann in 1961.

== Career ==
Finn won the 1959 Tour of Ulster and the 1961 Rás Tailteann.
