= Kilgobnet =

Civil parish in County Waterford, Ireland

Coordinates: 52°07′16″N 7°38′32″W

Kilgobnet (Irish: Cill Ghobnait, meaning 'church of Gobnait') is one of 74 civil parishes in County Waterford, Ireland. Located within the Diocese of Waterford and Lismore, according to Samuel Lewis's Topographical Dictionary of Ireland, the parish had a population of approximately 3,000 inhabitants in 1837.

Kilgobnet is also the name of a small townland, of approximately 1.2 square kilometres (0.46 sq mi), within the civil parish of the same name.
