= Kildangan =

Village in County Kildare, Ireland

Kildangan Irish: Cill Daingin
- Village
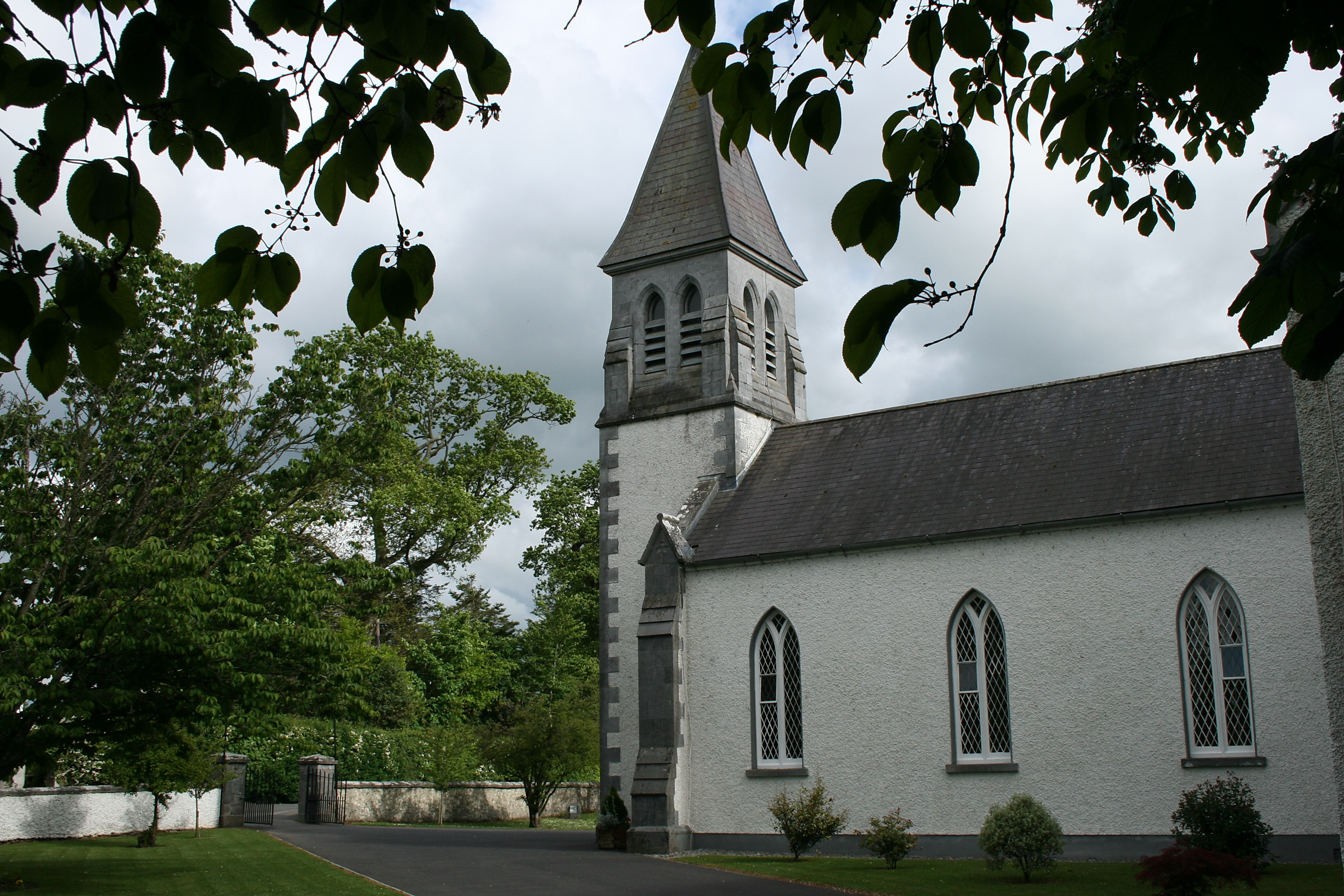
- Kildangan Church

- Location in Ireland
- Coordinates: 53°06′20″N 7°00′38″W
- Country: Ireland
- Province: Leinster
- County: County Kildare

Area
  - Total: 15.00 km^{2} (5.79 sq mi)

Population (2016)
  - Total: 317
  - Density: 21.1/km^{2} (54.7/sq mi)
- Time zone: UTC+0 (WET)
  - Summer (DST): UTC-1 (IST (WEST))
- Irish Grid Reference: N656063

Kildangan (/kɪlˈdæŋɡən/; Irish: Cill Daingin, meaning 'the church of the fort') is a village in County Kildare, Ireland. It is also a townland and civil parish.

== History ==
During the Anglo-Norman settlement of Ireland, Maurice Fitzgerald of Allen built a castle there as part of a defensive line along the River Barrow from Carlow to Lea Castle near Portarlington. Near the castle a church was built which gave the locality its name. The original castle and church were located within what are now the grounds of Kildangan Stud. The castle was dynamited in 1882 and the stone reused to build the existing Victorian Jacobean style house to the design of William Hopkins.

== Location ==
Kildangan is situated on the R417 between Monasterevin and Athy. The village lies close to the flood plain of the River Barrow, near the County Laois border. Kildangan is linked to Kildare town by means of the Local Road L3010, which passes through Kildangan Stud.

== Transport ==
=== Road ===
Kildangan is well served by road; however, its location and poor public transport creates a high car dependency.

=== Rail ===
Kildangan railway station opened on 15 March 1909 and finally closed on 1 January 1963. Its last station master was Tommy Maher, who was in charge from 1958 until its closure in 1963. Since the closure of Kildangan station the nearest station is Monasterevin railway station around 6 kilometres distant.

=== Bus ===
Local Link operate a service through Kildangan three times daily to Athy, Kildare Town and Newbridge.

== Population ==
Kildangan village had a population of 317 as of the 2016 census, up from 299 as of the 2011 census. The village lies in the electoral division (ED) of Kildangan and Ballybrackan. Between 1996 and 2011, there was a 151% increase in population of the Kildangan ED. The village is approximately 60 km from Dublin and within its commuter area. Employers in the immediate area include Bord na Móna, Kildangan Stud, and the agricultural sector.

== Development ==
Under the Kildare development plan 2017 to 2023, Kildangan was designated as a village as it had experienced significant levels of urban generated growth. One of the objectives of the development plan is for new housing shall to be predominantly focused on local needs. The plan provides for local demands in accordance with the provisions of the county settlement strategy. The plan also allocates an area for a 'village centre', located on the site of the derelict post office.

== Religion ==
In the parliamentary return of 1731, Richard Foxcroft, Vicar stated "in the parish of Kildangan there is no mass house built, but the priest of Lackagh say Mass often at the back of the old chapel there". The present Catholic church was built in 1792 on a site provided by the O'Reilly family and is a protected structure. The church was enlarged in 1849 by Susan O'Reilly, grandmother of Roderic More O'Ferrall. A brass plaque at the rear of the center aisle reads "In memory of Dominick O'Reilly of Kildangan Castle who was born on the 16th of June 1786 and died on the 15th of July 1845 and of his wife Susan Cruise of Feamore, Co Mayo who died on the 6th of December 1839 and of their children Eliza and Anne who died in early Youth. Their sole surviving child, Susan O'Reilly, has erected this tablet to her parents and sister in affectionate remembrance of their virtues and their love and she entreats the prayers of the faithful for their souls. Their bodies are interred in Kildangan grave yard"

The church tower and bell were added in 1881. The church is dedicated to "Our Lady of Victories" Kildangan (along with Nurney) formed part of Monasterevin Parish until 2007, when both came under control of St Brigids Parish, Kildare.

== Business ==
Business in Kildangan Village consists of Kildangan Stud, Crosskeys public house, Gala filling station, a chip shop and a few small home businesses. The filling station supplies every day needs, motor fuel, and a postal point. Kildangan post office closed in 2004, and is now derelict.

Kildangan Stud was founded by the More O'Ferralls on the site of Kildangan Castle. The grounds contain a variety of rare ornamental trees, shrubs and woodland. Kildangan Stud was sold in 1986 by Roderic More O'Ferrall to the Maktoum family. Prior to the sale to the Maktoum family, the stud farm was offered to the Irish State; however, the offer was allowed lapse by the Haughey government.

Racehorse trainer Michael Halford established a stable in Doneany, three kilometers from Kildangan Village in 2008.

== Education ==
Increase in local school population, 1995 to 2019

Kildangan has one primary school, Kildangan National School, which is a coeducational school. The original school on the present site dated from the 1870s. This was entirely rebuilt in 1963 at a cost of £16,500. This building was extended in 2008 and again in 2012 in order to cater for the increase in population. The above chart illustrates the increase in school attendance from the late 20th to the early 21st century.

Kildangan Education Centre is a preschool facility in the Village Centre Development which opened in 2011. The preschool provides a free year of education to all children before they begin primary school, as well as providing part-time sessions for children from 2 years and 6 months. An adult education centre in the adjoining unit, which opened in March 2012, provides adult classes and support classes for second-level students. The centre also provides children's classes such as cookery, Irish, French, art, and drama.

== Sport and leisure ==
Kildangan hall, built in 1940 and renovated 1986, has long been in use for dancing, concerts and other forms of recreation. It also acts as a scout den for the 25th Kildare Scouts.

Gaelic football is the main sporting activity and the local GAA team is Kildangan GAA.

Kildangan was the birthplace of Paddy Flanagan, winner of the Rás Tailtean three times (in 1960, 1964 and 1975).

After the World War II, Kildangan Stud was the home of a cricket club.

== People ==
- Paddy Flanagan

== See also ==
- List of towns and villages in the Republic of Ireland
