= Billy Kerr =

Irish cyclist

Personal information
- Born: 26 February 1945 Ballymena, Northern Ireland
- Died: 14 August 2012 (aged 67)

Cycling career
- Sport: Cycling

Billy Kerr (26 February 1945 – 14 August 2012) was an Irish cyclist. He competed in the individual road race event at the 1980 Summer Olympics.

== Biography ==
Kerr was born in February 1945 in Ballymena, Northern Ireland. At the age of 16, Kerr was working in a local shoe factory and later joined the Ballymena Road Club. However, as a junior cyclist, Kerr initially had to give up the sport due to a back injury. After successful physiotherapy, Kerr won multiple club races and national championships in the 1970s.

Kerr's took part in the road race and team pursuit events at the 1978 Commonwealth Games, his first international races. Four years later, at the 1982 Commonwealth Games, Kerr was part of the team that finished in fourth place in the team time trial. He also competed at three editions of the UCI World Championships in the late 1970s and early 1980s. Kerr was part of the Irish team for the 1980 Summer Olympics in Moscow, finishing in 41st place in the individual road race.

In 1980, Kerr won the King of the Mountains classification in the Milk Race, and in 1982, Kerr won the Tour of Ireland. At the Irish National Cycling Championships, Kerr won the men's time trial in 1981, and the men's road race in 1982. Kerr was also a two-time winner of the Tour of Ulster.

Kerr died in August 2012 following a short illness, at the age of 67.
