= Ciarán Power =

Irish cyclist

Personal information
- Born: 8 May 1976 (age 50) Waterford, Ireland
- Height: 1.84 m (6 ft 0 in)
- Weight: 68 kg (150 lb)

Cycling career
- Sport: Cycling
- Current team: Retired
- Discipline: Road
- Role: Rider

Amateur teams
- 1997: Pédale Nantaise
- 1998: VC Saint-Quentin

Professional teams
- 2000: Linda McCartney Foods
- 2001: Saint-Quentin–Oktos
- 2002–2007: Navigators
- 2008: Pezula Racing

Ciarán Power (born 8 May 1976) is an Irish former professional racing cyclist, the first Irish cyclist to ride in a major tour since Stephen Roche in 1993. Power turned professional in 2000 with the Linda McCartney Racing Team and rode the 2000 Giro d'Italia, gaining 2 top ten stage finishes. When the McCartney team folded in 2001, Power joined the French Saint-Quentin–Oktos team before moving to the US the following season and joining Navigators.

After placing 3rd in the 1999 World 'B' road championship, Power came 74th in the 2000 Summer Olympics road race. In the 2004 Summer Olympics road race, he finished 13th, the highest placing by an Irish cyclist.

He retired from professional racing at the end of the 2008 season.

== Major results ==
2008 – Pezula Racing

- 1st, East Midlands International Cicle Classic (2.1)
- 1st, Rás Mumhan
  - 3 Stage wins
  - Points winner
- 7th, Irish National Road Race Championship (CN)
- 8th, Ronde van Overijssel (1.2)
- 10th, Philadelphia International Championship (1.HC)
- 12th, Reading Classic (1.HC)
- 18th, Commerce Bank Triple Crown (1.HC)
- 37th, Tour of Ireland (2.1)
  - 7th, Stage 3
  - 8th, Stage 2
  - 19th, Stage 1
- 37th, FBD Insurance Rás (2.2)
  - 1st, Stage 6
  - Points: 2nd
- 41st, Lehigh Valley Classic (1.HC)
- 51st, Tour de Beauce (2.2)
  - 2nd, Stage 2
  - 4th, Stage 6
- 77th, Tour of Qinghai Lake (2.HC)
  - 8th, Stage 10
  - 10th, Stage 7

2007 – Navigators Insurance Cycling Team

- 1st, Irish National Criterium Championship (CN)
- 4th, Rund um Köln (1.HC)
- xxth, FBD Insurance Rás (2.2)
  - 1st, Stage 4
  - 1st, Stage 7

2006 – Navigators Insurance Cycling Team

- 1st, Mengoni Cup (USA)
- xx, FBD Insurance Rás (2.2)
  - 1st, Stage 4
  - 1st, Stage 7
  - Mountains class: 1st
- 2nd, Irish National Road Race Championship (CN)

2004 – Navigators Insurance Cycling Team

- 1st, Stage 5a, GP Cycliste de Beauce (2.3)
- 5th, Wachovia Invitational (1.3)
- 6th, Irish National Road Race Championship (CN)
- 13th, 2004 Olympics Road Race (Athens)

2003 – Navigators Insurance Cycling Team

- 1st, Stage 3, FBD Milk Rás (2.5)
- 1st, Stage 7, FBD Milk Rás (2.5)
- 1st, Stage 3, Nature Valley Grand Prix
- 6th, Irish National Road Race Championship (CN)

2002 – Navigators Insurance Cycling Team

- 1st overall, FBD Milk Rás (2.5)
- 2nd, Irish National Road Race Championship (CN)
- 3rd, Stage 3, GP Cycliste de Beauce (2.3)
- 4th, First Union Classic (1.3)
- 4th, Grand Prix de la Ville de Rennes (1.3)

2001 – St. Quentin-Oktos team

- 3rd, Irish National Criterium Championship (CN)
- 7th, Irish National Road Race Championship (CN)

2000 – Linda McCartney Cycling Team

- 9th overall, Herald Sun Tour (2.4)
  - 2nd, Stage 12
  - 10 top 10 stage finishes
- 23rd overall, Tour of Langkawi
- 74th, Olympics Road Race
- 122nd overall, Giro d'Italia (Grand Tour)
  - 5th, Stage 3
  - 6th, Stage 16
  - 13th, Stage 21
  - 18th, Stage 10
  - Points class: 42nd
  - First Grand Tour completed

1999 – Comeragh CC (amateur)

- 6th overall, Tour of Egypt (part of Irish team)
  - 1st, Stage 7
  - 2nd, Stage 3
  - 10th, Prologue (ITT)
- 7th overall, Tour of Rhodes (part of Irish team)
  - 6th, Stage 2
  - 10th, Stage 4
- 8th, Irish National Road Race Championship (CN)

1998 – (amateur)

- 1st overall, FBD Milk Rás
- 1st, Irish National Under 23 Road Race Champion (CN)
