= John Mangan =

Irish cyclist

Personal information
- Born: 1949/50 Killorglin, County Kerry, Ireland

Cycling career
- Sport: Cycling
- Discipline: Road bicycle racing
- Role: Rider

Amateur team
- 1968–1984: Kerry

Major wins
- Rás Tailteann, 1972

John Mangan (born 1949/50) is an Irish cyclist. He won the Rás Tailteann in 1972.

== Early life ==
Mangan is a native of Killorglin.

== Career ==
In 1968 Mangan won the Junior Men's event at the Irish National Cycling Championships.

Mangan took part in the ongoing struggle between the National Cycling Association (NCA) and Cumann Rothaíochta na hÉireann for the right to represent Ireland in international competition, participating in an attempt to infiltrate a team into the 1972 Olympic road race event. He pulled Noel Teggart from his bike in the individual road race, inspiring universal condemnation.

He participated in many events in France, winning 156 continental races.

Mangan suffered a skull fracture in 1983 and retired the following year.

== Personal and later life ==
Mangan is an avid hunter, having a licence to cull sika deer in Kerry. He lost part of his hip in a shooting accident.
