= Joseph Connaughton (politician) =

American politician (?-1875)

Joseph Connaughton (c. 1833 or 1838 – September 2, 1875) was a state legislator in Louisiana. He was elected to two terms. He only served part of his second term in the Louisiana House of Representatives. He was African American.

He was born in Rapides Parish, Louisiana, where he became a carpenter. He represented his native parish in the Louisiana House of Representatives from 1872 until 1875 when he lost his seat due to the Wheeler Compromise.

He was part of the 1873 Louisiana Colored Men's Convention in New Orleans. He served on the Committee on Canals and Drainage.

Connaughton died on September 2, 1875, at the age of 37 according to one source, or "about 42 years" according to another, while walking at the corner of Canal Street and Royal Street in New Orleans. He was described as "suddenly throwing up his hands and dropping upon the pavement in a speechless condition". One obituary stated:

Though he was allied politically to the bad band in our Parish, who have sought our ruin, still we have always considered him a head and shoulder above them all in good, personal traits of character, and he was anything but a bad man. We have known him from boyhood and can bear personal testimony to his good traits as a good man. These traits he has more than proven to us, when others of far more pretensions turned us the ungrateful shoulder.

A coroner later ruled that Connaughton's death was caused by "congestion of the brain".

== See also ==
- African American officeholders from the end of the Civil War until before 1900
