= Philip Cassidy =

Irish cyclist

Personal information
- Born: 12 October 1961 (age 65)

Cycling career
- Sport: Cycling
- Current team: Dunboyne Cycling Club

Philip Cassidy (born 12 October 1961) is an Irish former cyclist. He competed at the 1984 Summer Olympics and the 1988 Summer Olympics. He was the winner of Rás Tailteann in 1983 and 1999.
