= Peter Doyle (cyclist) =

Irish cyclist (1945–2025)

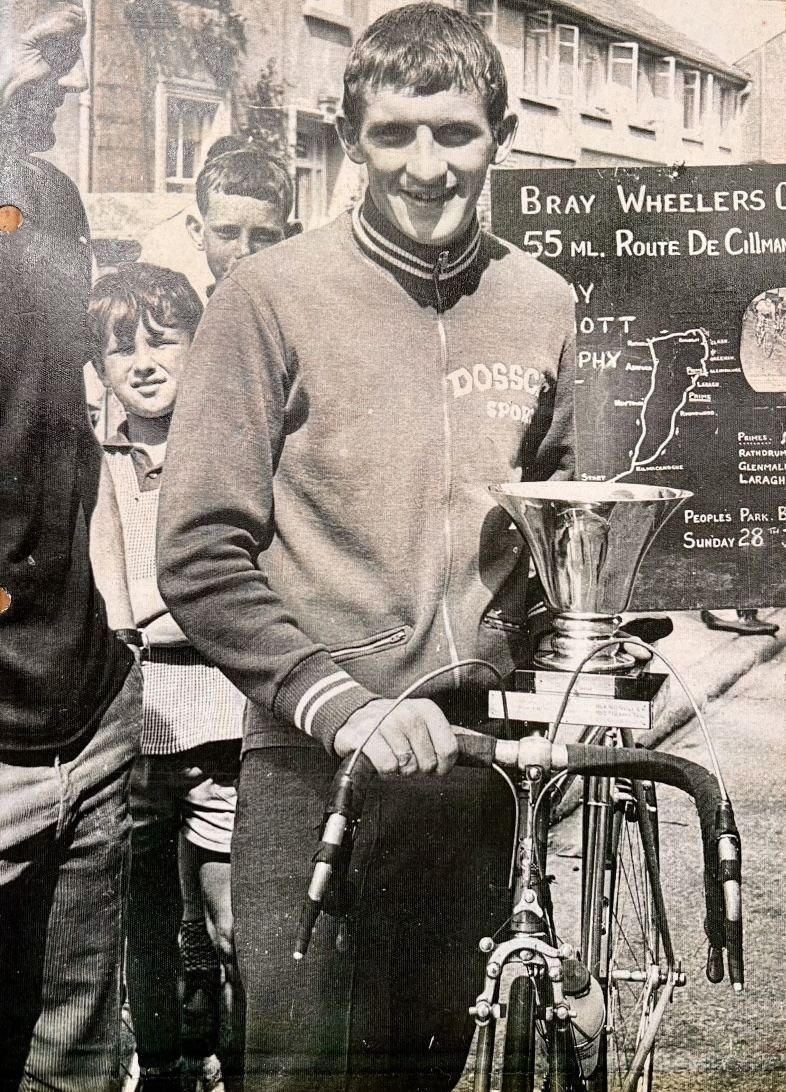
- Doyle after winning the Shay Elliott road race in 1973

Personal information
- Born: 26 November 1945 Wicklow, Ireland
- Died: 23 August 2025 (aged 79) Bray, County Wicklow, Ireland

Cycling career
- Sport: Cycling
- Discipline: Road
- Role: Rider

Amateur teams
- 1959–2025: Bray Wheelers
- 1969: Pelforth–Sauvage–Lejeune

Major wins
- Tour of Ireland, 1973; Rás Tailteann, 1974

Peter Doyle (26 November 1945 – 23 August 2025) was an Irish road cyclist from County Wicklow. He competed at the 1968 and 1972 Summer Olympics for Ireland and was regarded as one of the most accomplished Irish amateur riders of the 1960s and 1970s. Doyle's career highlights include victory in the 1974 Rás Tailteann, the 1968 Tour of Ireland, and the 1968 Irish National Road Race Championship, all while representing Bray Wheelers.

== Early life ==
Peter Doyle was born in Wicklow, Ireland, on 26 November 1945. He joined Bray Wheelers Cycling Club as a teenager in the late 1950s and quickly gained recognition for his climbing ability and tactical skill. By the early 1960s, he had become one of Ireland's leading amateur riders, representing both his county and the national team in domestic and international competitions.

== Cycling career ==
Throughout the 1960s and 1970s, Doyle was a prominent figure in Irish road racing. He represented Ireland at the 1968 Mexico City and 1972 Munich Games and competed in numerous international stage races.

However, 1968 was perhaps his biggest year winning the Tour of Ireland as a 21 year old becoming the first Irishman ever to win the Tour of Ireland, a victory that made headlines across the country and placed him firmly in the national sporting spotlight. He also rode the Tour of Britain, winning two stages, finishing 3rd overall and winning the mountains and points classifications.

Though he was offered professional contracts and declined them, he went to race in France for periods and won the Essor Breton stage race in 1969.

In 1969, he rode for the French amateur team Pelforth–Sauvage–Lejeune, gaining valuable experience on the continental circuit. He claimed the national road race title in 1968, won the Tour of Ireland in 1968, and captured the overall victory in the 1974 Rás Tailteann, Ireland's premier multi-stage race.

Doyle was admired for his calm demeanour, endurance, and sportsmanship, earning a reputation as one of Ireland's finest all-rounders and an inspiration for the next generation of riders.

== Major achievements ==
- 1974 – Winner, Rás Tailteann
- 1968 – Winner, Tour of Ireland
- 1968 – Winner, Irish National Road Race Championships
- 1968 – Competed for Ireland, Mexico City Olympics
- 1972 – Competed for Ireland, Munich Olympics

== Later life and death ==
After retiring from top-level competition, Doyle remained active within Bray Wheelers, supporting local races and mentoring young cyclists. He was widely respected in the Irish cycling community for his generosity and lifelong commitment to the sport. Doyle died on 23 August 2025 in Bray, County Wicklow, aged 79.

== Legacy ==
Peter's contribution to Irish cycling was recognised formally when he was inducted into the Cycling Ireland Hall of Fame in 2019. In doing so, he joined another Bray Wheelers great, Peter Crinnion, who had been honoured in 2013.

Doyle's contribution to Irish cycling was recognised through numerous tributes following his death. He was remembered as a pioneer of Wicklow cycling and a central figure in the long history of Bray Wheelers, helping to shape the club's ethos and inspire future generations.
