= Tour of Ulster =

Bicycle road race on the island of Ireland

Race details
- Date: Early May
- Region: Ulster, Ireland
- Discipline: Road race
- Type: Stage race
- Organiser: BGN Sports Management
- Race director: Garry Nugent
- Web site: www.tourofulster.com

History
- First edition: 1956
- Editions: 61 (as of 2019)
- First winner: Brian Monaghan (IRL)
- Most wins: Sé O Hanlon (IRL) (4 wins)
- Most recent: Conor Hennebry (IRL)

Location of Ulster in the island of Ireland. Six counties (pink) make up Northern Ireland (part of the United Kingdom), while three counties (green) are part of the Republic of Ireland.

The Tour of Ulster is a road bicycle racing stage race held around the Irish province of Ulster, divided between the Republic of Ireland and Northern Ireland. It was first run in 1956. It is rated as a National Event on the Union Cycliste Internationale's race classification system. The most prolific winner is Irish rider Sé O Hanlon, who won the race four times between 1961 and 1966.

It is currently sponsored by Victus Renewable Energy and so is known as the Victus Tour of Ulster.

== Previous winners ==
Year	Winner	Team
2022	Cancelled due to lack of entries	
2021	Cancelled due to COVID-19 pandemic	
2020	Cancelled due to COVID-19 pandemic	
2019	Conor Hennebry (2)	Dan Morrissey-MIG.ie-Pactimo
2018	Joe Evans	Saint Piran
2017	Eoin Morton	UCD Cycling Team
2016	Conor Hennebry	Team Aqua Blue
2015	Mark Dowling	DID Dunboyne
2014	Damien Shaw	Team Aqua Blue
2013	Joe Fenlon	Team Aqua Blue
2012	Adam Armstrong (2)	Eurocycles
2011	Pete Williams	Motorpoint
2010	Adam Armstrong	Eurocycles
2009	Sean Downey	Banbridge CC
2008	David McCann (3)	Giant Asia Pro Team
2007	Ryan Connor	Giant Asia Pro Team
2006	Ray Clarke	Dan Morrissey, Tipperary
2005	David McCann (2)	Giant Asia Pro Team
2004	Tommy Evans (2)	Totalcycling, Belfast
2003	Timmy Barry (2)	Cidona Carrick Whs, Tipperary
2002	Rob Holden	Isle of Man
2001	Timmy Barry	Cork C.C.
2000	Philip Cassidy	Navan Road Club
1999	Ciaran Power	Cidona Carrick Wheelers, Tipperary
1998	Tommy Evans	Banbridge C.C.
1997	Stephen O’Sullivan	Coors-Bray Wheelers, Wicklow
1996	David McCann	Phoenix C.C., Belfast
1995	Paul Giles	Bann Valley C.C.
1994	Cormac McCann (2)	Phoenix C.C., Belfast
1993	Paul Slane	Team Devlin Opticians, Belfast
1992	Cormac McCann	Phoenix C.C., Belfast
1991	Enda Murray	Navan Road Club
1990	Alan Gornall	BCF/NW Centre of Excellence
1989	Ben Luckwell	Great Britain
1988	Ian Fagan	U.K. Professionals
1987	Seamus Downey	Banbridge C.C.
1986	Andy Wilkinson	Port Sunlight Wheelers, Merseyside
1985	Norman Campbell	Cyprus C.C., Belfast
1984	Dave Lloyd	Manchester Wheelers
1983	Billy Kerr (2)	Ballymena Road Club
1982	Raphael Kimmage	Tara Road Club, Dublin
1981	Billy Kerr	Ballymena Road Club
1980	Aidan McKeown	Phoenix C.C., Belfast
1979	Gerry Lundy	St.Agnes C.C., Belfast
1978	Seamus Kennedy (2)	Navan Road Club
1978	Pat McGarrigle	St.Agnes C.C., Belfast
1977	Seamus Kennedy	Navan Road Club
1976	Mick Nulty (2)	Platten Road Club
1975	Denis Devin	Boyne Valley C.C.
1974	Mick Nulty	Boyne Valley C.C.
1973	Mike O’Donoghue	Futuro C.C., Carlow
1972	Race Not Promoted	
1971	Brian Connaughton	Navan Road Club
1970	Larry Clarke	Navan Road Club
1969	Race Not Promoted	
1968	Kevin Dolan (2)	St.Furseys C.C., Dundalk
1967	Kevin Dolan	St.Furseys C.C., Dundalk
1966	Sé O Hanlon (4)	Clan Brugha C.C., Dublin
1965	Sé O Hanlon (3)	Clan Brugha C.C., Dublin
1964	Sonny Cullen	Setanta C.C., Dublin
1963	John O’Mahoney	St.Finbarrs C.C., Cork
1962	Sé O Hanlon (2)	Clan Brugha C.C., Dublin
1961	Sé O Hanlon	Clan Brugha C.C., Dublin
1960	Ben McKenna	St. Patrick's C.C., Julianstown
1959	Tom Finn	Tailteann C.C., Dublin
1958	Frank Thompson	Glen C.C., Belfast
1957	Michael Campbell	Baile Ur, Newtownhamilton
1956	Brian Monaghan	Newry Wheelers
