= Sé O'Hanlon =

Irish cyclist (1941–2026)

Personal information
- Born: 14 September 1941 Dublin, Ireland
- Died: 30 August 2026 (aged 84) Dunshaughlin, County Meath, Ireland

Cycling career
- Sport: Cycling
- Discipline: Road racing
- Role: Rider

Major wins
- 1st, Rás Tailteann (1962, 1965, 1966, 1967); 1st, Tour of Ulster (1961, 1962, 1965, 1966)

Séamus "Sé" O'Hanlon (14 September 1941 – 30 August 2026), also known as Shay O'Hanlon, was an Irish amateur road racing cyclist. He was a top amateur in Ireland in the 1960s and 1970s, winning the Rás Tailteann stage race in 1962, 1965, 1966 and 1967. O'Hanlon belonged to the National Cycling Association (NCA), one of the three cycling associations in Ireland at that time and the one whose members were excluded by the UCI from world championships and Olympic Games.

== Specific race history ==
O'Hanlon dominated the Rás Tailteann and wore the leader's yellow jersey for 36 days, winning 24 stages, his first in 1960. The following year, he won three consecutive stages and in 1962 he won the race. He raced in France after his Rás win in 1962, had difficulty with his NCA licence in France but rode well before returning to Ireland. He won three consecutive Rás, leading from start to finish from 1965 to 1967.

In 1966 O'Hanlon rode against a French team which included Jean Bellay, who rode the 1954 Tour de France and 1957 Tour de France. Bellay finished second to O'Hanlon. O'Hanlon never won the race after 1967 but he was prominent each year until the mid-1970s. He wore the yellow jersey again in 1973 and rode the race every year until 1984.

He also holds the record for wins in the Tour of Ulster– 1961, 1962, 1965 and 1966. During the 1970s while still competing, O'Hanlon became president of the NCA and helped unify the cycling associations in Ireland, which meant riders of all associations could ride any race. The 1979 Rás Tailteann was the first in which the three associations competed together. An ICF team led by Peter Doyle rode the Rás in 1974 and an NCA team rode the Tour of Ireland that year. The three associations unified in 1987.

== Death ==
O'Hanlon died on 30 August 2026, aged 84.
