= Matthew Wilson (cyclist) =

Australian cyclist

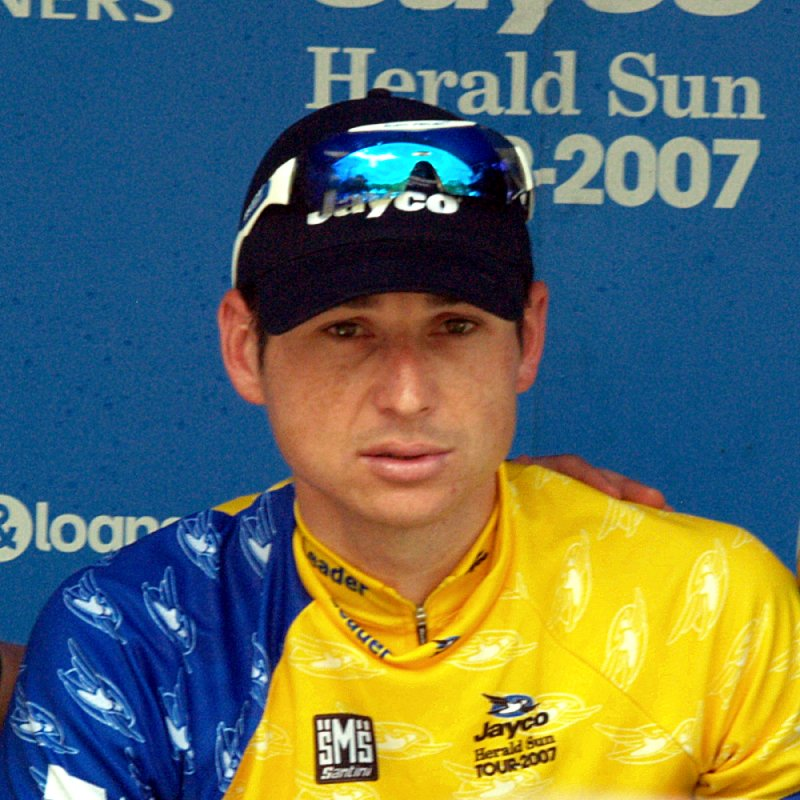
- Wilson at the 2007 Herald Sun Tour

Personal information
- Full name: Matthew Wilson
- Born: 1 October 1977 (age 49) Melbourne, Victoria, Australia

Cycling career
- Sport: Cycling
- Current team: Team Jayco–AlUla
- Discipline: Road
- Role: Rider (retired); Directeur sportif

Professional teams
- 2001: Mercury-Viatel
- 2002–2005: Française des Jeux
- 2006–2007: Unibet.com
- 2008–2009: Team Type 1
- 2010–2011: Garmin–Transitions
- 2012: GreenEDGE

Managerial team
- 2013–: Orica–GreenEDGE

Major wins
- National Road Race Champion (2004); Herald Sun Tour (2007); Mountains Classification Tour of Ireland (2008 & 2009)

Matthew "Matt" Wilson (born 1 October 1977 in Melbourne, Victoria) is a retired professional Australian road racing cyclist, who competed as a professional between 2001 and 2012. During 2007 he rode as a domestique for the UCI ProTour team Unibet.com. In 2008 and 2009, he rode as a team leader for the US-based Team Type 1, and rode for the Garmin–Transitions team in 2010 and 2011. He joined GreenEDGE for the 2012 season, and retired after the Vattenfall Cyclassics in August of that year.

Wilson's talent ensured that he became a part of the Australian national team with basis in Italy. He was diagnosed however with Hodgkins disease in 1999 and he moved back to Australia. After the cancer treatment, he decided however to take up cycling again. His friend and Unibet teammate Baden Cooke helped him to get a place in the professional stable Mercury-Viatel.

When he came to Europe for the first time in 2001 he sold his car and his only bike to pay the flight. He won a stage in Tour de l' Avenir 2001 and with his stage win he earned a stagiaire contract as well at Française des Jeux. When he went home to Australia for winter he told Marc Madiot that he had to sell his bike so he would need another one in order to train. Madiot was so impressed by Wilson's dedication that he included the story in his motivational speeches for young riders. From the following year Wilson rode for Française des Jeux together with Baden Cooke.

At the start of 2003, Wilson won the Australian road race championship.

He won the Herald Sun Tour in October 2007 winning 2 stages along the way. He also said it was his most important and favourite victory in his life.

== Major results ==
2001
1st GP Roger De Vlaeminck Eeklo
1st Stage 2 Tour de Liège
1st Stage 4 Tour de l'Avenir
3rd National Road Race Championships
2002
1st Stage 3 Tour de l'Avenir
1st Stage 8b Herald Sun Tour
2003
3rd Melbourne to Warrnambool Classic
7th Overall Herald Sun Tour
2004
1st National Road Race Championships
144th Overall Tour de France
2005
1st Jayco Greater Dandenong Criterium
2007
1st Overall Herald Sun Tour

1st Stage 1

2008
1st Stage 2 Geelong Bay Classic Series
1st Stage 2 Cascade Classic
1st Stage 6 Tour de Beauce
1st King of the Mountains Herald Sun Tour
4th Overall Tour of Ireland

1st King of the Mountains

2009
1st King of the Mountains Tour of Ireland
1st Bound Brook
7th Overall Tour Down Under
