= Joseph Connaughton (cricketer) =

English cricketer (1918–1944)

Joseph Maurice Francis Connaughton (15 August 1918 – 12 February 1944) was an English first-class cricketer active 1939 who played for Middlesex.

He was born in Paddington and educated at The Oratory School. During World War II he was commissioned in the Royal Artillery. He was drowned off the Maldives after SS Khedive Ismail was torpedoed, and officially declared dead one year later.
