= Tour of Ireland =

Cycling race

Race details
- Date: September and October 1985–1992; August 2007, 2008
- Region: Ireland
- Local name(s): Nissan Classic (1985–1992); Tour of Ireland 2007–09
- Nickname: Nissan Classic (1985–1992)
- Discipline: Road race
- Competition: UCI Europe Tour
- Type: Stage race (2.1)
- Organiser: The Events Group / Shadetree Sports

History
- First edition: 1953
- Editions: 35 (as of 2009)
- Most wins: Sean Kelly (IRL) (4 wins)
- Most recent: Russell Downing (GBR)

The Tour of Ireland (Irish: Turas na hÉireann, known from 1985 to 1992 as the Nissan Classic) was a bicycle stage race held in August, which ran for 35 editions over a 56-year period. Irish rider Seán Kelly recorded the most wins, four.

The first Tour of Ireland race debuted in 1953 and ran until 1957. It was revived in 1965 and ran until 1985. In 1985 the 5-day Nissan International Classic took over as the Tour of Ireland. This lasted for 8 years until 1992. The race returned 15 years later, in 2007, as the Tour of Ireland and was part of the UCI Europe Tour. The organisers confirmed on 1 June 2010 that the 2010 race would not take place due to a financial shortfall, and as of 2019, there is no further news of a revival.

== History ==
=== Origins, 1950s ===
The original Tour of Ireland was a cycling stage race run in Ireland between 1953 and 1984, and organised by the internationally recognised governing body, Cumann Rothaíochta na hÉireann (CRE), later reformed as the Federation of Irish Cyclists. In 1953 the Irish Government initiated An Tóstal, a cultural festival, and asked all Irish sporting bodies to participate. As part of this the CRE ran a four-day Tour of Ireland. With sponsorship from An Tostal, Aspro and Hercules cycles, the event was known as the Tostal Tour and was a big success throughout most of the country, although it was said to have "had a hard time in the NCA heartlands of Kerry" There is limited information about the race available on the internet and no book has been written about the event. The inaugural edition was a 4-day race won by Brian Haskell from John Perks and A Walker. Seamus Elliot who later won a stage and wore the yellow jersey in the 1963 Tour de France finished tenth overall. Briton Brian Robinson who also won a stage in the Tour de France finished fifth in this first edition. According to Alf Buttler, an amateur cyclist during and after the second world war the leader's jersey was purple and the race continued but as a seven-day race the following year, 1954, beginning on Thursday 29 April. The 1954 race was covered by J B Wadley and photographer Bill Lovelace for The Bicycle magazine and a full report appeared in the 5 May issue. Bernard Pusey (England A team) won from Seamus Elliott (Ireland A team) and Tony Hoar (England B team). According to Bray Wheelers, an Irish cycling club from Bray, Wicklow, the event continued until 1957.

=== First revival, 1960s ===
The tour was revived in 1965. During the seventies the race was known as the Raleigh Dunlop Tour of Ireland. The event continued to 1984. Winners during this period include Bray Wheelers Peter Doyle (1968) and Paul Elliott (1970), Doug Dailey (1971, 1973), Liam Horner (1972), a double Olympian, Tony Lally (1974), a 1980 Olympian and the youngest ever winner at age 20, Pat McQuaid (1975, 1976; later UCI President), Ángel Arroyo (1977), runner up in 1983 Tour de France, John Shortt (1978) and Ron Hayman (1979) who was followed home by Phil Anderson, Stephen Roche and Robert Miller in 2nd, 3rd and 4th.

=== Nissan International Classic, 1985–1992 ===
The Nissan International Classic was then organised from 1985 until 1992 which it appears took over from the Tour of Ireland. The Nissan Classic was referred to as the Tour of Ireland by the famous Irish cyclist Stephen Roche during the 1987 edition.

The race was organised by the Events Group and was sponsored by Nissan; Alan Rushton was the race controller and future President of the UCI, Pat McQuaid, was the race director. It was a hugely successful event that captured the spirit and imagination of the race going public who stood at the side of the road in vast numbers. The event occurred during the golden age of Irish cycling when Sean Kelly and Stephen Roche were at the height of their success in European cycling. Kelly dominated the Irish event by winning four of the eight races. Roche won two stages in the first edition and finished second in the 1987 edition while wearing the rainbow jersey of world champion but never won the event. The event used the most famous 'wall' in Ireland – the steep ascent of St. Patricks Hill in Cork city as the finale of a stage in almost every edition of the event. Other areas that the event regularly visited included Kelly's hometown of Carrick-on-Suir in County Tipperary, O'Connell Street in Limerick and Eyre Square in Galway. The race used to finish on O'Connell Street in Dublin after doing many laps of a circuit in the city centre.

=== Third revival, 2007–2009 ===
After a break of fifteen years, it was announced that the event was returning to Ireland in early 2007 and sponsored by Fáilte Ireland and called the Tour of Ireland. This event was organised by the Events Group and Shadetree Sports and the route of the race took in many of the same areas that the Nissan Classic covered. Just like the 1987 edition of the Nissan Classic, the Tour of Ireland started from Kilkenny Castle. The first stage used St. Patricks Hill in Cork city in its finale. The five-day stage race concluded on 26 August and was won by Stijn Vandenbergh of Belgium. Lance Armstrong & Mark Cavendish took part in the 2009 edition, which was shortened to a 3-day event due to the economic downturn. The organisers confirmed on 1 June 2010 that the 2010 race would not take place due to a financial shortfall, but that they hoped it will return in 2011. It was due to take place from 18 August to 22 August 2010.

== Past winners ==
Edition	Year	Winner	Nationality	Team	KOM	Points/Sprints
1	1953	Brian Haskell	United Kingdom	London NCU		
2	1954	Bernard Pusey	United Kingdom	England A		
3	1955	Brian Haskell	United Kingdom	Yorkshire		
4	1956	Jimmy Rae	United Kingdom	Scotland		
5	1965	Brian Jolly	United Kingdom	Kirkby CC, Liverpool		
6	1966	Roy Hempsall	United Kingdom			Sheffield
7	1967	Nigel Dean	United Kingdom			
8	1968	Peter Doyle	Ireland	Bray Wheelers		
9	1969	Morris Foster	United Kingdom			
10	1970	Paul Elliot	Ireland	Bray Wheelers		
11	1971					
12	1972	Liam Horner	Ireland	County Dublin Road Club		
13	1973	Doug Dailey	United Kingdom			
14	1974	Tony Lally	Ireland			
15	1975	Pat McQuaid	Ireland	Irish National Team		
16	1976	Pat McQuaid (2)	Ireland			
17	1977	Ángel Arroyo	Spain			
18	1978	John Shortt	Ireland			
19	1979	Ron Hayman	Canada	Archer Road Club		
20	1980	Arthur Cunningham	Northern Ireland	Northern CC		
21	1981	David Grindley	England	LIVERPOOL CENTURY		
22	1982	Billy Kerr	Northern Ireland			
23	1983	Not held				
24	1984	Bob Downs	United Kingdom			
25	1985	Sean Kelly	Ireland	Skil Sem Kas Miko		
26	1986	Sean Kelly (2)	Ireland	Guinness-Kas Mavic	Teun van Vliet (Netherlands)	Malcolm Elliot (United Kingdom)
27	1987	Sean Kelly (3)	Ireland	Castrol Burnmah-Kas		
28	1988	Rolf Gölz	Germany	Superconfex Yoko Opel	Tom A Ward (United Kingdom)	
29	1989	Eric Vanderaerden	Belgium	Panasonic–Isostar	Tom A Ward (United Kingdom)	
30	1990	Erik Breukink	Netherlands	PDM-Ultima Concorde		
31	1991	Sean Kelly (4)	Ireland	PDM-Cidona		
32	1992	Phil Anderson	Australia	Motorola	Stephen Roche (Republic of Ireland)	
33	2007	Stijn Vandenbergh	Belgium	Unibet.com	Roger Beuchat (Switzerland)	Matti Breschel (Denmark)
34	2008	Marco Pinotti	Italy	Team Columbia	Matt Wilson (Australia)	Russell Downing (United Kingdom)
35	2009	Russell Downing	United Kingdom	Candi TV-Marshall's Pasta	Matt Wilson (Australia)	Russell Downing (United Kingdom)
