= Donal O'Connell =

Irish road racing cyclist and sport administrator

Personal information
- Born: 1928 Dublin, Ireland
- Died: 26 January, 2016 (aged 87–88) Dublin

Cycling career
- Sport: Cycling
- Rider type: Time trialler

Amateur team
- 1948-1988: Dublin Wheelers

Donal O'Connell (1928—26 January 2016), Dublin, Ireland, was an Irish road racing cyclist, and later cycling sport administrator. He set several national records and qualified for the Olympic Games, and served as a race official and administrator for more than 40 years, holding office at club level for more than 30 years, later holding several national roles and then co-founding the Irish Veteran Cycling Association.

== Life ==
=== Cycling career ===
==== Early cycling career ====
O'Connell began cycling with the Dublin Wheelers cycling club in 1948, participating in road races and time trials, most notably from 1948 to 1956; he was later made a life member of the club.

In 1952, he was selected to ride for Ireland in the World Championships in Luxembourg, and in international races on the Isle of Man alongside Shay Eliott. He also won an Olympic trial race that year, qualifying to attend, but Ireland was excluded from the Olympics in cycling at that time. In 1953, he won the national Road Race Championships, just ahead of Shay Eliott and then Jim McQuaid. He also secured several place-to-place Irish records, such as Dublin-Wexford in 3 hours and 58 minutes, and Dublin-Derry in 7:09.

==== Club and national office ====
Having held various club offices, he was nominated by the Dublin Wheelers and elected as Road Racing Secretary of the internationally recognised cycling federation, the Irish Cycling Federation (ICF), for 1972–1974. The Dublin Wheelers were very active in national cycling governance in the 1960s and 1970s, with, in 1972, for example, Liam King as general secretary and Joe Doyle as treasurer, in addition to O'Connell as road racing secretary, Paddy McInerney time trial secretary, and Steve Lawless organiser of the Tour of Ireland, while Willie Marks also competed for a national committee general position. Along with Ian Gallahar as P.R.O. for several years, all of these served many years in national sport organisation.

O'Connell was a representative of the ICF to the global cycling conference of 1974, and seated on the Olympic Council of Ireland. He later participated in the Tripartite Committee, which worked between the various cycling bodies on the island of Ireland, and on the disciplinary and sporting committees of the fully unified Federation of Irish Cycling. O'Connell also worked on the organising committee of the Tour of Ireland from 1968 to 1980.

O'Connell qualified as a masseur and accompanied Irish cycling teams abroad in that capacity. He also worked as a team mechanic, and team manager, and with the Falcon team in the Nissan International Classic in Ireland over two years.

==== Veterans ====
In 1966, O'Connell co-founded the Irish Veteran Cyclists Association (IVCA), and cycled competitively at veteran level until 1988, and casually until the 2010s. In 1989, he became general secretary of the IVCA, serving for more than a decade, and later being elected as Honorary President for life.

=== Personal life ===
O'Connell was a staff member and later a manager at Frawley's department store on Thomas Street in Dublin's Liberties. He married Elizabeth (Lily) O'Connell, whose sister Rita married the brother of his friend and fellow Dublin Wheelers committee member, Joe Doyle. The O'Connells had five children: Anne, Brendan, Maureen, Donal and Shane. Three children, and his wife, as well as grandchildren and great-grandchildren, survived him. He lived most of his life in the Manor Estate between Terenure, Kimmage and Greenhills. He became ill in 2013, died 26 January 2016; his funeral was at Greenhills and he was buried at Palmerstown Cemetery.
