= Ballygall =

Suburb of Dublin, Ireland

Ballygall Baile na nGall (Irish)
- Suburban area
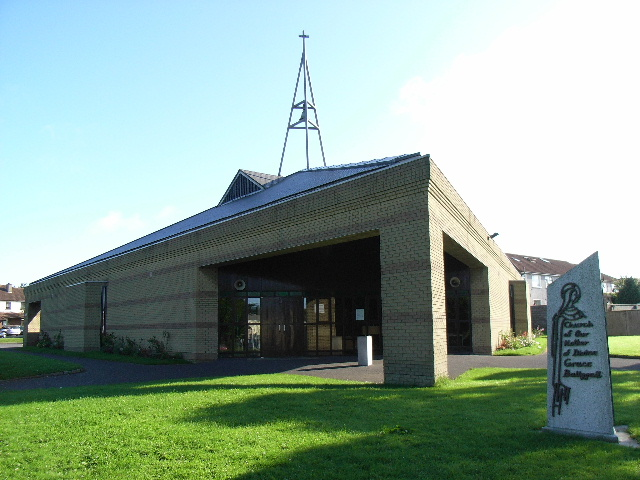
- The Church of Our Mother of Divine Grace (Roman Catholic) in Ballygall

- Location within Dublin Location within Ireland
- Coordinates: 53°23′01″N 6°16′30″W
- Country: Ireland
- Province: Leinster
- County: County Dublin
- Local authority: Dublin City Council

Government
  - Dáil Éireann: Dublin North-West
  - EU Parliament: Dublin
- Time zone: UTC+0 (WET)
  - Summer (DST): UTC-1 (IST (WEST))
- Eircode routing key: D11

Ballygall (Irish: Baile na nGall, meaning 'townland (baile) of the foreigners') is a small suburban area located between Glasnevin and Finglas, on the northside of the city of Dublin, Ireland. It is also a townland divided between the civil parish of Finglas and that of Glasnevin. It was settled by Vikings in the 11th century, and later by the Cambro-Normans.

The area is largely residential, with St Kevin's College, some shops, and a church and schools.

== Etymology ==
The Cambro-Normans called it Fyngallestoun, the township of Fingal, but the indigenous Gaels called it the town of the Galls, or foreigners, hence in Gaelic, Baile na nGall. Whether from the Normans or the Gaels, it was abbreviated later in old charters to Gallstoun. It seems to have been originally settled by a man called Arthur, hence it appears also as Arthurstoun. It seems to have morphed from Gallstoun to Ballygall sometime in the 16th century. There are many similarly named denominations in the archives of the Registry of Deeds.

== History ==
A place called Arthureston is mentioned explicitly as a manor in the Chancery Rolls of Ireland in several places under several entries during the reign of King Edward III in the 14th century. A very specific reference to Fyngaleston relates to Cristofor de Preston. It is also mentioned in the Calendar of the Gormanstown Register as a manor, and was the original seat of the Prestons, the principal landholders of Fingal, before they moved to and became lords and later Viscounts of Gormanston. It was granted in 1318 as a Manor to William de Prestoun:

Charter. Edward (II), King of England, lord of Ireland, Duke of Aquitaine, in consideration of his good and laudable service, has granted to William de Prestoun, burgess of Drogheda, a messuage and a carucate and a half of land, with appurtenances, in Arthurestoun, which belonged to Hugh de Lacy, knight, of the gift of Henry de Fyngal, and which came to the king’s hands, as his escheat for the felony and forfeiture of said Hugh, who with the Scotch enemies of the king, with standard displayed, rose against the king with an armed force in Ireland, for which felony and forfeiture he was disinherited by judgement of the king’s court. To hold to William and his heirs for ever, of the King and his heirs, by service of rendering a rose yearly at the feast of St. John the Baptist. Witness, Roger de Mortuo mari [Mortimer], lieutenant of the King in Ireland, at Drogheda, 31 March a.r.xj. Edward [II] (1318).

A quit-claim of 1334 in the Gormanston Register also refers: Quit-claim of Arthurestoun, which is called Fyngallestoun. Hugh de Lacy, knight, has for ever released to William de Prestoun, burgess of Drogheda, all his right and claim.

Fyngalleston was the first royal grant made to the Prestons in Ireland, for laudable services, an honour. It was previously a knight's property, with associated demesnes and lordships. It may in fact be the only manorial title which the Prestons held originally directly from the Crown (as distinct from those to which they succeeded from others). It was therefore held as tenants-in-chief, and as their initial principal manor. Although the Prestons later disposed of the lands, the lordship of the manor was not alienated, and remained with the Prestons under reversion, and passed eventually to a resident of Ballygall. At the time in 1363 when the lands were being disposed, Robert de Prestoun was deeply involved in the acquisition of the more substantial Manor of Gormanston. In fact Gormanston was acquired in the same year as the lands at Fyngallestoun were disposed. It is not known exactly when the manor of Fyngallestoun ceased to function as a manor (with courts leet and baron), but it is likely that it ceased when the Prestons moved from Fyngallestoun to Gormanston c. 1363, which then became their chief manor (and for which extensive records of manorial courts exist still in the ownership and custody of Viscount Gormanston). The shift in nomenclature of Fyngallestoun/Gallstoun to Ballygall probably occurred in the 16th century.

Historically, a large part of the original townland of Ballygall belonged to the Ball family. Margaret Bermingham (1515–1584) married Bartholomew Ball, a prosperous merchant who held houses in Ballygall and Merchants’ Quay. Their manor house Ballygall House was built in the early 16th century, most likely on the site of the old Manor of Fyngallestoun, and was located where the modern housing estate now called Hillcrest Park is located. Ballygall House was located between the present houses numbered 10–60 in Hillcrest Park, its demesne extending to Glasnevin Avenue. The Ballygall estate which belonged to the Ball family in the 16th century was used for agricultural purposes right up to 1964 when the last owners, the Craigie family of Merville Dairy in Finglas, sold it for housing development.

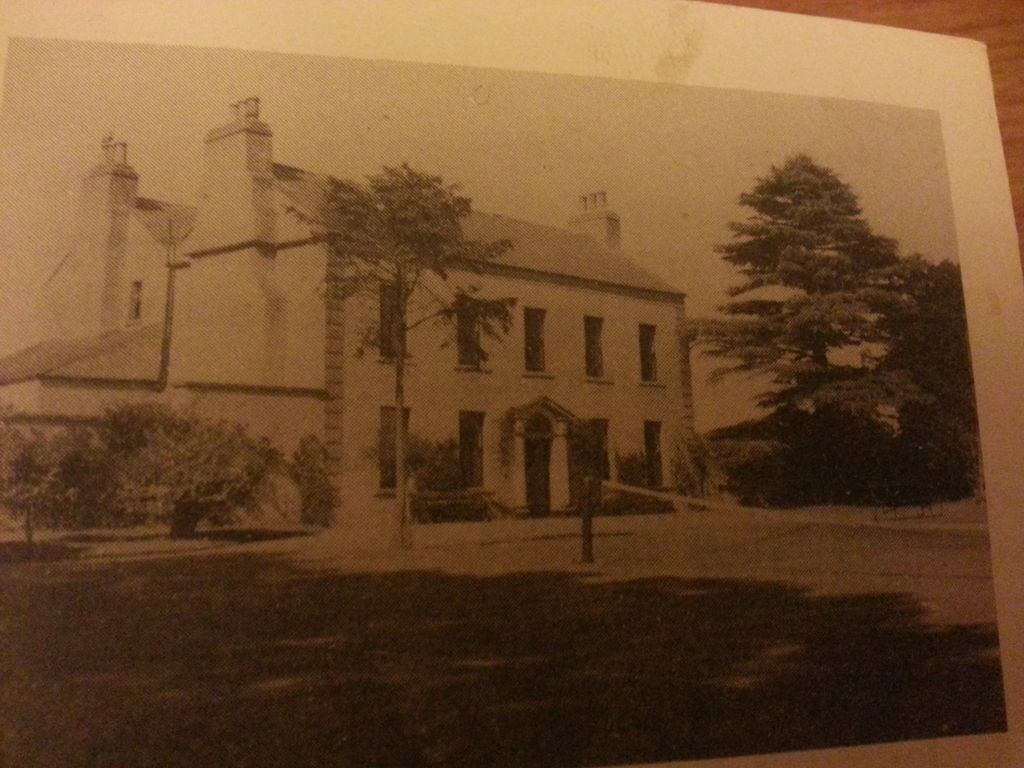
Ballygall House, 16th century seat of the Ball family. The final occupants were the Craigie family. Photo was taken in 1964.

Margaret Ball (the former Margaret Bermingham) maintained a Catholic household at Ballygall House where she gave refuge to Catholic clergy and provided education to the children of Catholic families despite being prohibited to do so by Penal Laws. Imprisoned by her son, Walter Ball (d. 1598), who conformed to the established (Anglican) church and who became Mayor of Dublin in 1577, she died in 1584 in Dublin Castle. In September 1992 Pope John Paul II beatified Margaret Ball along with 16 other martyrs who had died at the hands of English authorities in Ireland due to their unwillingness to accept the Protestant faith. She is Secondary Patroness of the Roman Catholic Parish of Ballygall, which includes an oratory to her memory.

== Location ==
Ballygall lies within the southern part of ancient Fingal, although the modern county of the same name has its southern boundary a bit further north. Its centre is about 2 km from the centre of Glasnevin and 3 km from central Finglas. Ballygall is divided between the barony of Castleknock to the west and the barony of Coolock to the east. Ballygall lies between the villages of Finglas and Glasnevin, and the old parish, now large suburban district, of Ballymun.

Within the area of Fingal, a location identified as “Gallenstown” appears in the map of County Dublin drawn by Sir William Petty in the 17th century. Ballygall (Gallstown in Gaelic is Baile na nGall, anglicised Ballygall) is a modern parish between Finglas and Santry in old Fingal, and is referred to as Ballygals or Ballygales in the Civil Survey of 1654. The Civil Survey relates properties in very close proximity in the Finglas-Santry axis: Finglas (p. 143); Barnewall's farm "south with ye lane leading from Ffinglas to Ballygals, west to Arthur’s land, north to Jamestown', [etc.]”. This area comprising Finglas, Ballygall, and through Santry to the coast near Howth, just north of Dublin would have been the original heartland of Fingal, “land of the foreigners” from which they gradually spread north along the coast and inland, hence the original denomination of Fyngallestoun. The neighbouring Manor of Glasnevin is now the Holy Faith Convent.

The modern townland has an area of 134 acres (0.54 km^{2}) of which 85 acres (340,000 m^{2}) are in the Barony of Castleknock, Civil Parish of Finglas, and 49 acres (200,000 m^{2}) in the Barony of Coolock, Civil Parish of Glasnevin.

=== Boundaries ===
The portion of the townland in the parish of Finglas covers the areas of Ballygall Road East, Hillcrest, Benevin and parts of Glasnevin Avenue to the north with Saint Kevin's College on the southern boundary. The portion of the townland in the Civil Parish of Glasnevin covers the area from Ballygall Road East in front of the Church of the Our Mother of Divine Grace and the western portion of St. Canices Road and Wadelai estate

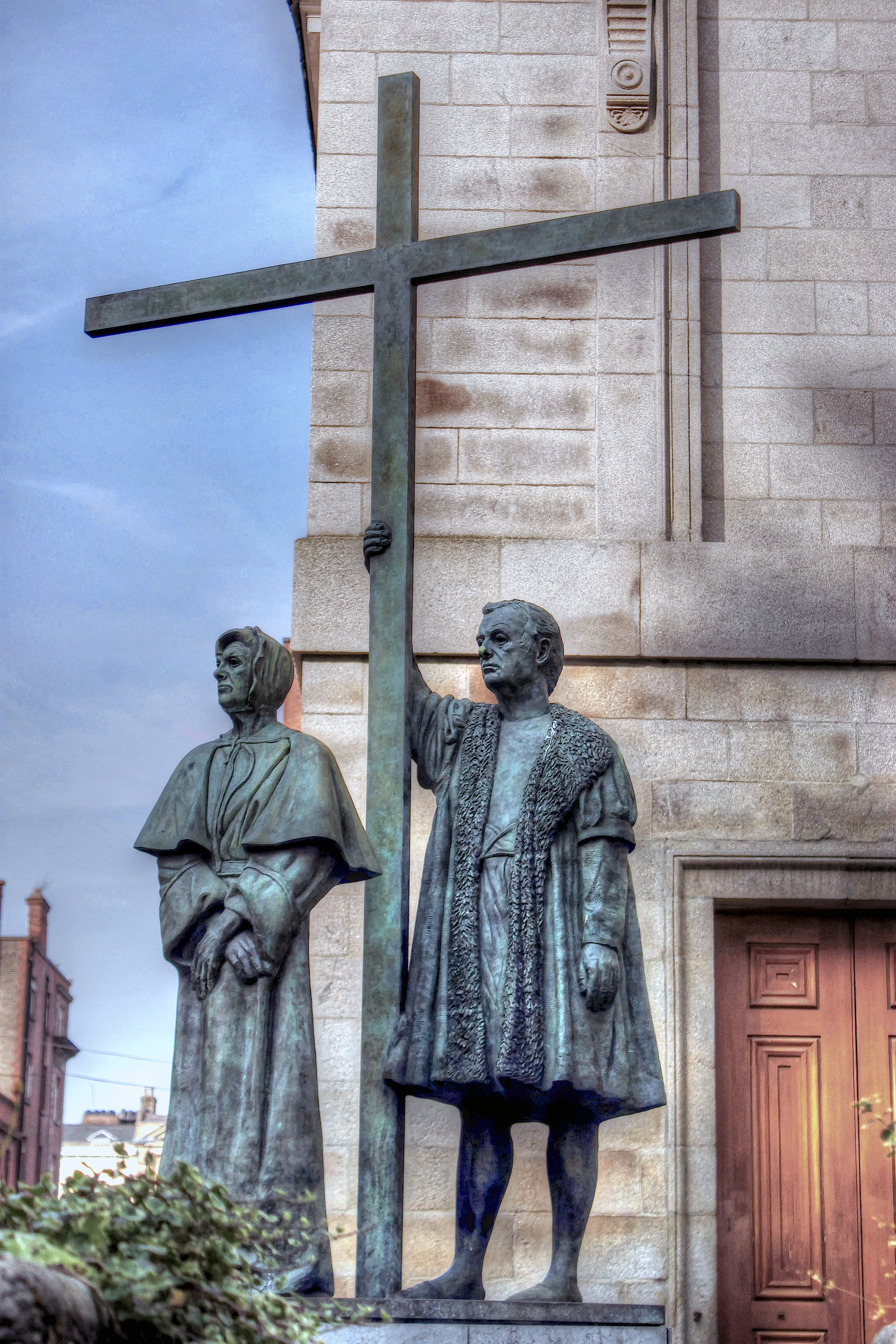
Sculpture of the "Dublin Martyrs", Mayor Francis Taylor and his grandmother-in-law Mayoress Margaret Ball. It stands outside St Mary's Pro-Cathedral in Dublin.

== Religion ==
Ballygall is a parish in the Fingal South West deanery of the Roman Catholic Archdiocese of Dublin, served by the Church of Our Mother of Divine Grace. Centred on the townland of Ballygall, it was constituted in 1964 from Glasnevin, and its boundaries also include other townlands such as Johnstown, Tolka, Walnut Grove and Wadeli.

== Community and voluntary sector ==
The Catholic parish hosts a unit of the Order of Malta Ambulance Corps and its cadets.

== Education ==
Among Ballybough's primary (national) schools are Mother of Divine Grace Primary School, Sacred Heart National School, and Our Lady of Victories Infant School. The local secondary schools include St. Kevin's College, and Beneavin De La Salle College.

== Notable people ==
- Bartholomew Ball (d. 1573), Mayor of Dublin
- Blessed Margaret Ball (1514–1584), Irish martyr
- Walter Ball (d. 1598), Mayor of Dublin, co-founder of Trinity College Dublin
- Patrick Cosgrave (1941–2001), journalist, writer and special advisor to Margaret Thatcher
- Marian Finucane, broadcaster
- Gavin Friday, songwriter/performer (1959-)
- Linda Gorman, Ireland women's soccer team and manager
- Teresa Mannion, TV broadcaster and news reporter.
- Jim McQuaid, leading racing cyclist and later national coach
- Paddy McQuaid, cyclist, later president of the national cycling federation
- Pat McQuaid, racing cyclist, later president of the national cycling federation and the world governing body
- Colm Meaney (1953- ), actor
- Francis Martin O'Donnell (1954- ), ambassador, Knight of Malta, diplomat, historian
- James O'Higgins Norman, academic and author.
- David O'Leary (1958- ), Irish soccer international footballer
- Barney Rock, Dublin County footballer 1979-1991
