= Joe Doyle (cyclist) =

Irish road racing cyclist and sport administrator

Joseph Doyle (born 1933 in Dublin, Ireland), was an Irish road racing cyclist and cycle sport administrator, holding office at club, county and national federation level for more than 20 years, including 14 years as national treasurer.

== Life ==
=== Cycling career ===
After recovering from a childhood leg illness, Doyle began cycling with the Dublin Wheelers Cycling Club in the 1950s; he was joined by his brother Noel, and later another brother, Frank. He participated in road races and time trials and, after winning the handicap event of the Wheelers Winter Cycling League in 1954, was selected to ride in the Isle of Man international annual races in 1955, then one of the main external race destinations from Ireland as well as races in Belgium and France.

He also held various club and Dublin County Board offices, including a spell as Chairman of the Dublin Wheelers, then one of the biggest and most active clubs in the country, and others as Dublin County Treasurer and Dublin County Club Secretary.

==== National roles ====
In 1962 Doyle was nominated by the Dublin Wheelers and elected as national treasurer of the internationally recognised cycling federation, the CRÉ, for the 1963 season. By November 1963 he reported greatly improved finances. Having been involved over the years in discussions about the unification of Irish cycling, he was reported to have resigned in 1966 in protest at aspects of the process, but this report was later refuted. After the planned dissolution of the CRÉ in October 1967, he was deeply involved in the transition to the new national organisation, the Irish Cycling Federation, that December, and was elected its first treasurer, continuing in office until 1976.

The Dublin Wheelers were very active in national cycling governance in the 1960s and 1970s, with, in 1971–1972 for example, Liam King as general secretary and Doyle as treasurer, as well as Donal O'Connell as road racing secretary, Paddy McInerney time trial secretary, and Steve Lawless organiser of the Tour of Ireland, while Willie Marks also competed for a national committee general position. Along with Ian Gallahar as P.R.O., all of these served many years in a national sport organization.

In 1973, Doyle promoted changes to the governance of the ICF, whose committee had agreed that a smaller executive structure would be more efficient. Doyle stepped down as treasurer in November 1976, then served one year as assistant to the new holder of the office. Throughout the 1960s and 1970s, Doyle continued to officiate at races, working closely with fellow Dublin Wheelers Willie Marks and Donal O'Connell. After a break, he cycled into his 60s.

=== Personal life ===
Coming from the Liberties and Synge Street CBS, and later qualifying as a carpenter and then a builder, Doyle later also worked as a site foreman, and a Clerk of Works at the Office of Public Works, overseeing maintenance and projects at a range of state buildings and national monuments around Dublin. Married to Margaret, and with three children, he lived most of his life in parts of Raheny. He died on 4 April 2012 at a nursing home in Howth after a prolonged illness and was buried at Glasnevin Cemetery. One of his brothers, Noel, married the sister of his fellow Dublin Wheelers and national executive committee member, Donal O'Connell.
