= Steve Lawless =

Irish road racing cyclist and sports administrator

Steve Lawless (born 1937 or 1938) from Dublin, Ireland, was an Irish road racing cyclist and later cycling administrator, holding office at club and national level in Irish cycling over more than 15 years, including spells as co-director of the Tour of Ireland stage race and as national president, and helping to drive the unification of the sport on the island of Ireland.

== Cycling career ==
Lawless began cycling with the Dublin Wheelers cycling club in the 1950s, participating in road races and time trials.

=== National roles ===
Having held various club offices, he was nominated by the Dublin Wheelers and elected as General Secretary of the internationally recognised cycling federation, the CRÉ, in 1960, at the young age of 22. He stepped down from two posts, General Secretary and International Secretary, in 1968, but continued as a member of the executive. The Dublin Wheelers were very active in national cycling governance in the 1960s and 1970s, with, in 1972, for example, Liam King as general secretary and Joe Doyle as treasurer, in addition to Donal O'Connell as road racing secretary, Paddy McInerney time trial secretary, and Lawless organiser of the Tour of Ireland, while Willie Marks also competed for a national committee general position. Along with Ian Gallahar as P.R.O. for several years, all of these served many years in national sport organisation.

Having been elected afresh as General Secretary in 1973, after two years Lawless ran for the post of national cycling president in 1975. As president in 1978, he played a leading role in the final negotiations which led to the form of the provisional national unity body, the Tripartite Committee. After the successful formation of the permanent unified national federation, then the Federation of Irish Cyclists (FIC), Lawless took an eight-year break from national administration, returning in 1988 as Chairman of a newly-formed Mid-Eastern Regional Committee.

=== Later club career ===
He was chairman of the Dublin Wheelers as late as 1989.
