= Jim McQuaid =

Irish road racing cyclist and sports administrator

James K. McQuaid (1920 – 16 September 1991) was an Irish road racing cyclist and later cycling administrator, coach and team manager from Dungannon, County Tyrone, Northern Ireland, for most of his life based in Dublin, Ireland. From a family that became prominent in Irish cycling, he raced competitively, co-founded a cycle racing club. and served on the committee of the national cycling federation.

== Life ==
McQuaid was born in 1920 in Dungannon, Co. Tyrone, with one elder brother, and a sister. A Roman Catholic, he married a Protestant, and due to the atmosphere at the time in Northern Ireland they decided to move to Dublin in 1948, as Jim's elder brother Paddy had done a year earlier. Jim set up a greengrocery, with a small bakery, in the small district of Ballygall, between Glasnevin and Finglas in the northwestern Dublin suburbs. Jim and Madge McQuaid continued to live in Dublin, and had seven sons and three daughters.

=== Cycling career ===
McQuaid and his brother Paddy had already been racing in Northern Ireland, in both track and road disciplines, and continued in their new home, both seeking national and international competition. In 1949, Paddy was a key driver in the foundation of Ireland's new internationally recognised cycling federation, CRÉ, partly to ensure access to international competition, and Jim was also involved.

Jim and Paddy McQuaid founded a cycle racing club, Emerald Cycling Club (sometimes Emerald Cycle Racing Club), in late 1949. They kept it small and selective, aiming for high race performance; the club survived until the late 1990s, racing nationally and internationally.

==== National competition ====
McQuaid raced competitively from the 1940s to the early 1960s. He participated in National Athletics and Cycling Association, Athletics Board and club races, initially racing for Harp Cycle Club, and later participated in events approved by the CRÉ, and raced under Emerald club colours. He won a range of national titles, at distances from 440 yards to 200 kilometres, including the Grand Prix of Ireland six times between 1951 and 1961, and a number of annual club prizes, such as the Hercules Challenge Club of the Dublin Wheelers.

==== International competition ====
McQuaid competed in the World Championships in six countries, including each year from 1951 to 1954. He was also selected for the 1948 Olympic Games but internal disputes in Irish cycling and the position of the international governing body regarding these prevented his actually participating.

McQuaid was also selected, for example, to a joint team from Ireland (CRÉ) and Northern Ireland (NICF) in 1953, to compete in both road race and sprint competitions in Zurich.

He retired from competitive cycling in 1963.

==== Sport administration and team management ====
In 1958 McQuaid also became involved in the national administration of cycling, securing election as an ordinary committee member of the internationally recognised cycling federation, the CRÉ. In 1959 and 1960 he was elected as Track Racing Secretary, and he later served again as a committee member. After a gap he ran for the post of International Secretary for 1974, serving for a year; running for 1974, he lost to the national executive's first female member, Elizabeth Corcoran, but he served one more term in that role, elected in November 1977.

McQuaid also managed teams representing Ireland for international events, including the Olympic Games (in Mexico in 1968) and the Tour of Britain.

=== Commercial activities ===
Oliver McQuaid founded McQuaid Cycles in 1974, and over time it had shops at at least four locations across Dublin (the family also had a wholesale bike import business); the original shop, in Ballygall, between Glasnevin and Finglas, remains in business, as of 2019.

== Personal life ==
The McQuaids' children all became involved in Irish cycling affairs, all seven boys cycling competitively, and the three girls becoming involved in race promotion and marketing. Six of the boys competed internationally, including at the Olympics, and the eldest, Pat, progressed to a short professional career, a longer career in coaching and national administration, and eventually headed the world governing body for cycling, the UCI, for two terms.

Having lived in Ballygall for many years, Jim and Madge McQuaid moved to Bettyglen, Raheny. Jim McQuaid died at home on 16 September 1991, survived by his wife, children, grandchildren, brother and sister. His funeral was held at Raheny's Church of Our Lady Mother of Divine Grace and he is buried in St Fintan's Cemetery, Sutton.

Emerald Cycling Club promoted a Jim McQuaid Memorial road race in his memory, from at least 1996 to at least 2001.
