= Pat McQuaid =

Irish racing cyclist and executive, twice president of the world governing body

Pat (Patrick) McQuaid
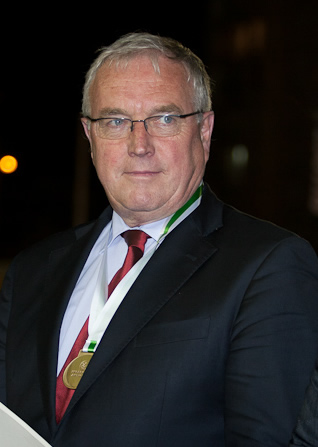
- Pat McQuaid in 2011

Personal information
- Full name: Patrick McQuaid
- Born: 5 September 1949 (age 77) Dublin, Ireland

Cycling career
- Sport: Cycling
- Discipline: Road
- Role: President of UCI, 2005-2013

Amateur teams
- 1966–1978: Emerald Cycling Club
- late 1960s: Clifton Cycling Club (Leeds)

Professional team
- 1978–1979: Viking–Campagnolo

Major wins
- Road Race Champion 1974; Tour of Ireland 1975 & 1976; Tour of the Pennines 1978

Patrick "Pat" McQuaid (born 5 September 1949 in Dublin, Ireland) is an Irish former road racing cyclist who served as the president of the Union Cycliste Internationale from 2005 to 2013.

He had a strong amateur career and a brief professional period before moving into race promotion and administration in Ireland and globally, serving four years as head of Irish cycling's governing body, and later two four-year terms as president of the world governing body, the Union Cycliste Internationale (UCI). He also served three years as a member of the International Olympic Committee. McQuaid is also a qualified secondary school teacher.

== Family background ==
McQuaid comes from a cycling family, with his father Jim being a top amateur cyclist and later coach and official, and his uncle a leader in the national cycling organisation. His parents came from Dungannon in County Tyrone, Northern Ireland, where his father already raced. The McQuaids moved to Dublin due to the Troubles in Northern Ireland, which had more opportunities and which provided a better atmosphere for mixed couples (his mother was Protestant and his father was Catholic), and settled in Dublin's northern suburbs. On Ballygall Road in the locality of Ballygall between Glasnevin and Finglas, Jim McQuaid ran a greengrocers and bakery, opposite a general store belonging to his brother, and the family lived above the shop.

Jim (d. 1991) and Madge McQuaid raised 10 children, seven sons and three daughters. Pat McQuaid was the firstborn, in Dublin in 1949. All seven brothers raced. Paul, Oliver and Darach McQuaid, the youngest of the ten, as well as cousin John McQuaid represented Ireland in world road championships and some in Olympic road racing. McQuaid himself was inspired by Shay Elliott, who visited his home when he was 12 or 13.

Over the last twenty years there have been family-owned 'McQuaid cycles' bicycle shops in Dublin, beginning, and remaining, with one in Ballygall, while a brother, Kieron McQuaid, is the second largest importer of bikes in Ireland, and another, Paul, runs a bicycle rental shop at Ussher's Island. Two of Pat McQuaid's sons have long established business interests in the sport - David McQuaid owns DMC Sports and is the general manager of an international cycling team, while Andrew McQuaid is a lawyer, rider agent and was a member of the three-person management team of Team Wiggins.

== Cycling career ==
McQuaid raced from 1966 to 1982, starting as a junior and then riding nationally and internationally as a senior.

=== Amateur period ===
McQuaid rode for the small elite club founded in 1949 by his father and uncle, Emerald Cycling Club. The club was heavily involved in domestic road racing, international racing and cycling administration in Ireland. He also rode for the Clifton Cycling Club in Leeds, Yorkshire for some time in the late 1960s, and later still for a year in France.

He was Irish national road champion in 1974. He won two of Ireland's three main road cycling events, the Tour of Ireland twice, in 1975 and 1976, and the Shay Elliott Memorial Race.

==== South Africa visit ====
McQuaid, his brother Kieron, and Sean Kelly, went to South Africa to ride the Rapport Tour stage-race in preparation for the 1976 Olympic Games. They and others rode under false names because of an international ban on athletes competing in South Africa - a protest against apartheid. The three Irish were detected, and suspended from racing for seven months by the national governing body, the Irish Cycling Federation. They were allowed back two months early, and were racing again, when the International Olympic Committee (IOC) banned them from the Olympics (this did not inhibit McQuaid from becoming a member of the IOC itself later).

=== Professional period ===
At the end of his career, he rode for the Viking Cycles professional team in Britain.

== Educational career ==
McQuaid qualified as a teacher of physical education (PE) and mathematics at Strawberry Hill Teacher Training College (now St Mary's University), Strawberry Hill, Twickenham near London. After qualification, he worked as a teacher for year in England, including a period teaching at a young offender institution in Kidderminster.

During his later amateur cycling career, his two years with Viking, and for a time after, he worked as a PE and maths teacher, first at the Greenhills College in Walkinstown, a suburb of Dublin, where he held a full-time temporary post for three years. With a young family, at the age of 26, he was offered an interview for a permanent post, but chose instead to leave the job and focus on racing in anticipation of the following year's Montreal Olympic Games. He later returned to teaching, at Ballinteer Community School. He also worked part-time on PE at Synge Street CBS.

== Cycling administration ==
Having taken at least one leave of absence, McQuaid moved fully into race organisation in 1985, and then later full-time sports administration. The highlights of this part of his career include:

=== Cycling in Ireland ===
- 1983 - 1986 (Appointed) Irish National Team Director
- 1985 - 1993 Founding Director of the Nissan Tour of Ireland
- 1995 - 1999 Elected to the Board of the Irish Cycling Federation, directly to the post of President
- 1998 Director of the Grand Depart for the Tour de France in Dublin, Ireland

In 1983, McQuaid discussed taking an Irish national race on to a "pro-am" basis (all Irish racing was amateur at the time) with Sean Kelly and Stephen Roche. The idea did not immediately develop, but in 1984, McQuaid persuaded Kelloggs to sponsor a criterium-type road race, the Grand Prix of Ireland. After adding a similar event in Cork, McQuaid then began to try to organise a full-scale five-day stage race around Ireland, working with Alan Rushton, formerly of Kellogg's and Viking Cycles. In February 1985, they announced the first Nissan International Classic Tour of Ireland, to be headlined by Sean Kelly and Stephen Roche. McQuaid secured acceptance, with a favourable calendar "slot", 25–29 September, which allowed riders to use the race for preparatory purposes, from the UCI.

McQuaid ran for the honorary post of President of the ICF in November 1994, losing heavily, but won a clear mandate in 1995, and was re-elected in 1997. In 1997, he was also elected to the Management Board of the international cycling federation. Due to the workload from this and the coming of the Tour de France to Ireland in 1998, for the final year of his time as President, the role was, in effect, split, with a new position of Chairman temporarily created for Dermot Dignam to look after domestic duties, while McQuaid focused on international representation. In 1999, ICF rules did not allow for a third term, but he continued with the international governing body and race organisation.

=== International race organisation ===
- 1993 - 1997 Director of the Tour of the Philippines
- 1993 - 2004 Director of the Tour of Langkawi (Malaysia)

=== International cycling administration ===
- 1997 - 2005 (Elected) Member of the Board of Management of the Union Cycliste Internationale (UCI)
- 1997 - 2005 (Appointed) President of the UCI Road Commission
- 2005 - 2013 (Elected, 2005 and 2009) President of the Union Cycliste Internationale (UCI)

==== Successor to Hein Verbruggen ====
McQuaid put himself forward for election as UCI President in 2005, after 16 years of Hein Verbruggen's leadership. His predecessor, also running, withdrew at the last minute, as did another candidate, and he won strongly (31-11), making him the first Irish person to head a major global sport federation (Lord Killanin had previously chaired the Olympic co-ordinating body, the IOC, 1972-1980). Unlike the Irish cycling federation honorary presidency, the world role was a paid post, with a salary in excess of 360,000 euro or 500,000 dollars.

When elected, McQuaid put strong emphasis on three main areas: managing the professional side of cycling, so that riders' salaries were clean and assured, and teams had a viable business model, anti-doping measures, and development of cycling beyond the traditional core countries of Europe.

==== Achievements ====
During his time in office McQuaid extended anti-doping measures, including the biological passport of which the UCI was a pioneer, and addressed the dispute dating back to 2005 with the Amaury Sport Organisation (ASO, organisers of the Tour de France) bequeathed by his predecessor, and tensions with the organisers of the two other Grand Tours, continuing development of the professional tours, now working on a three-tier system; further problems arose with the AMO from time to time, but they did not become acute again during McQuaid's time in office. He also oversaw an expansion of paid cycling and broadcast activity, bringing new funding to the sport. He also promoted new races worldwide and worked to expand cycling activity in less active territories, for example negotiating with South Australian Premier Mike Rann to agree the first ProTour status event outside Europe, the Tour Down Under in Adelaide, Australia.

==== Dealings with Igor Makarov ====
In 2012 McQuaid has a number of discussions with a colleague on the UCI Management Committee, Igor Makarov, the billionaire head of the Russian cycling federation, and advocate of cycling in his homeland of Turkmenistan, about the development of cycling in the former Soviet space. He stated that as he was considering not running for office again in 2013, due to the stress of the role, including the Lance Armstrong affair, he was open to new work, and in July of that year he signed a contract for consultancy on "the future development of cycling in ...Turkmenistan, including the preparation of a bid to bring the UCI Road World Championships there in 2017." After a successful Olympic season, he four months later decided to seek to continue in office, and withdrew from the contract, and he clarified "I should stress that at no point did I carry out any work relating to this contract, nor did I ever receive any payment relating to this contract."

There was later tension when a cycling team promoted by Makarov was refused a licence by the independent Licensing Commission of the UCI. By mid-2013 Makarov was campaigning against McQuaid's re-election bid.

==== Third term bid ====
On Friday 27 September 2013, he was a candidate for a third term as UCI President, with Brian Cookson, who had previously backed McQuaid, the only other candidate. He had originally been nominated by the cycling federations of his countries of origin, Ireland, and residence, Switzerland, but both nominations were withdrawn. The election proceeded based on two third country nominations, allowed under a then-new UCI rule. The election took place at the UCI Congress in Florence, and Cookson prevailed by 24-18 votes. McQuaid had pledged not to launch a legal challenge should he be defeated, in particular with reference to allegations of that votes had been "bought" by a member of the Management Committee who wanted McQuaid removed.

Cookson launched a review of some of McQuaid's and Verbruggen's policies and projects, such as the establishment of the Global Cycling Promotion company, which ran the new Tour of Beijing, the operation of the World Cycling Centre, and promised more proactive work on women's cycling. He also replaced the head of the UCI professional staff, the director-general, Christophe Hubschmid, with Martin Gibbs, a past UCI staffer who had managed his presidential campaign while Head of Policy and Legal Affairs of British Cycling.

==== Corruption allegations, lawsuits and vindication ====
For much of his term in office, McQuaid had to deal with allegations of doping in the sport, many dating back to previous decades, and especially around a handful of elite riders such as Lance Armstrong, Floyd Landis and Alberto Contador. As a result, he was also involved in defamation lawsuits, in Switzerland, against people who accused the UCI of corruption and insufficient action against the problem, most notably with regard to Armstrong.

In September 2013, during the UCI presidential election campaign, elements of a dossier prepared for the UCI Committee of Management member Igor Makarov, and shared with the USA delegate, were leaked to the press - they included allegations that McQuaid had made a promotional deal with Makarov, that the UCI had sought payment to cover up Alberto Contador's 2010 positive drug test, and that McQuaid made private arrangements with Lance Armstrong regarding drugs testing and race appearances. While Makarov refused to hand the dossier over to the UCI's Ethics Commission, requesting instead a one-time independent commission, it was eventually shown to McQuaid for comment, and sent to USADA (who took no formal action on it), as well as in some form being shared within the UCI Management Committee. McQuaid denied the negative allegations, as did Armstrong for his part, and McQuaid clarified that he had in 2012 signed a contract to advise on the development of the sport in Turkmenistan but had withdrawn from that contract before commencing work or receiving payment.

The UCI set up the Cycling Independent Reform Committee (CIRC) to investigate various allegations to do with historical governance and handling of doping. The committee interviewed UCI staff, cyclists and support staff, as well as having access to the UCI computer servers, accounts, departments and email and phone records, including those of McQuaid, both personal and business, in order to fully carry out their investigations. In March 2015, the CIRC report was made public. It stated that some matters might have been better handled, expressing concern that Lance Armstrong had received flexible treatment on several occasions, including being allowed to return to competition for a key event, the Tour Down Under, 10 days earlier than a six-month deadline, while he was also being asked to join a race in Ireland. However, it concluded that there was no evidence to support allegations against McQuaid or his predecessor of bribery from Armstrong, corruption or collusion with doping.

=== Olympic movement and WADA roles ===
- 2006 - 2014 (Elected) Member of the Board of Management of the Association of Summer Olympic International Federations (ASOIF), Vice-President 2009-2014
- 2009 - 2012 (Elected) Member of the Executive & Foundation Board of the World Anti Doping Agency (WADA)
- 2009 - 2014 (Elected) Member of the Board of SportAccord, the association of sports federations and related bodies
- 2010 - 2013 (Elected) Member of the International Olympic Committee (IOC), appointed to two IOC Commissions, Women in Sport, and Entourage, 2010-2013

== Later life ==
McQuaid left the UCI and cycling administration after failing to win re-election. He moved from Switzerland, and now lives in the south of France, running a holiday accommodation business.

=== Commentary on cycling and cycling administration ===
He has commented occasionally on his successors, and on ethics and doping. He has also spoken, somewhat harshly, on British cycling and especially Team Sky, for use of non-commercial and expensive bespoke bicycles, use of therapeutic usage exemptions (TUEs) and other matters.

== Family life ==
After Ballygall, he lived in Ballinteer in the southern suburbs of Dublin, then Roundwood in County Wicklow, and later in Switzerland, before settling in Correns, Provence, France in 2015.

He married his second wife Aileen McQuaid (née Carmody) in 2004.

== Awards ==
In March 2008, McQuaid was made a Commander in the Ivory Coast's Order of Sporting Merit (Commandeur dans l'ordre du mérite sportif de Côte d'Ivoire).
