= Balnagowan House =

Historic building in Dublin, Ireland

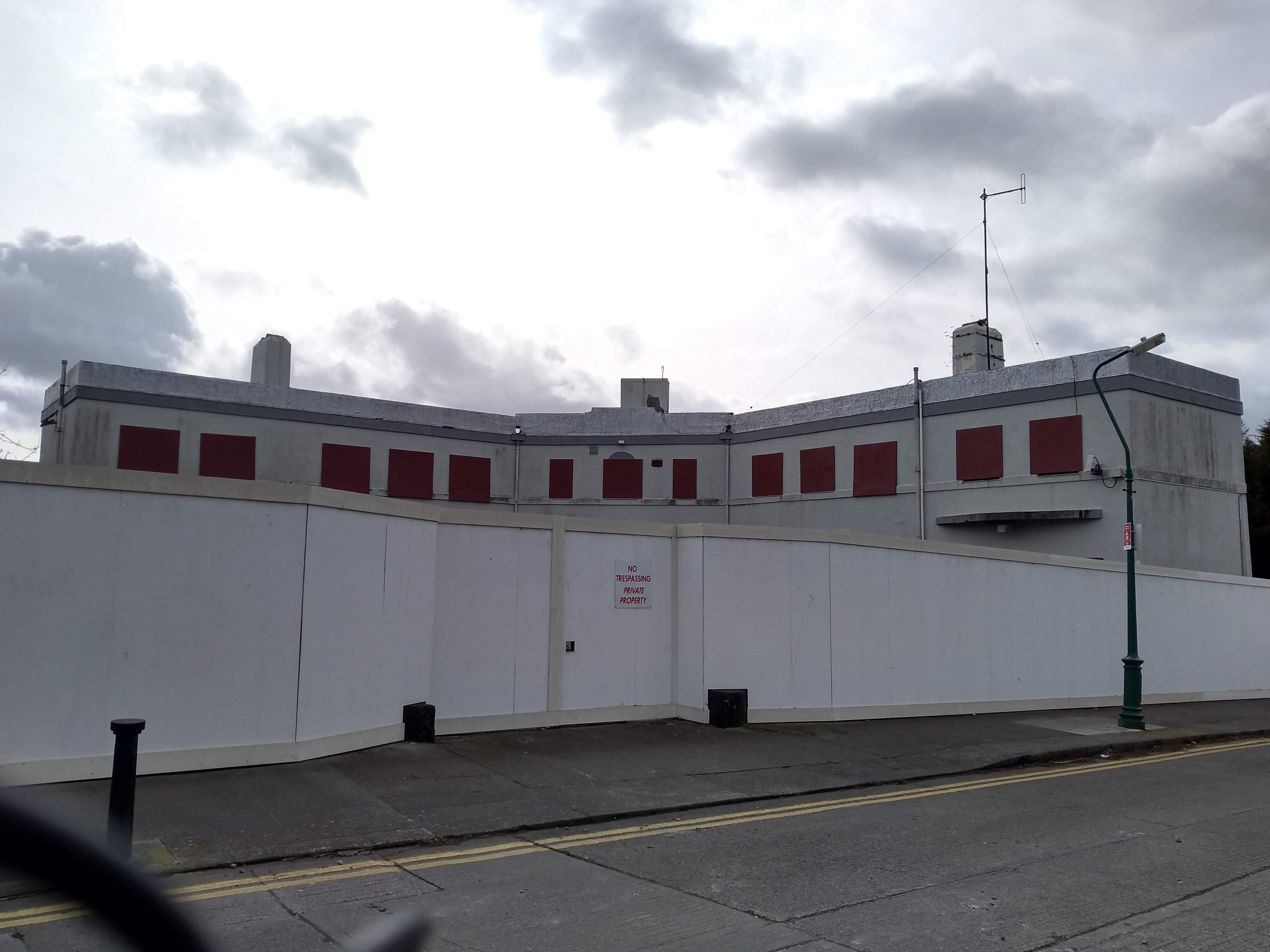
- The house in 2019

- Location within Dublin
- Alternative names: Wendon, Bealnagown House

General information
- Architectural style: International Style
- Location: St. Mobhi Boithrin; Dublin 9 D09 K5X2, Dublin, Ireland
- Coordinates: 53.376843°N 6.266122°W
- Groundbreaking: 1929
- Completed: 1930; 96 years ago
- Owner: George Linzell (1929-1938); John Doyle (1938-1971); Government ownership (1971-2005); Peter Purcell (2005-2013)

Design and construction
- Architect: Harold Greenwood

Balnagowan House, also known as Wendon, or Bealnagown House, is a historic building in the suburb of Glasnevin, Dublin, Ireland. It is considered the first individual house built in the international style in Ireland.

== History ==
=== 1920s to 1971 ===
Balnagowan House was built under the name Wendon in the late 1920s by the Dublin developer George Linzell. Linzell commissioned the London architect, Harold Greenwood, to design the house. The name Wendon is an amalgamation of the names of Linzell's two children's names, Don and Wendy. Linzell used the house as an advertisement for his speculative building business. After its completion the magazine Irish Builder described the house as "Dublin's Wonder House" in 1932. It is regarded as the first individual house in Ireland to have been built in a modernist or international style of architecture. Linzell, the son-in-law of Alexander Strain, built this family home within the larger development of houses he was building along Mobhi Road and off the Ballymun Road. Linzell sold the house in 1938, when he moved to Ballsbridge where he was building more houses.

The house's second owner was the publican John Doyle, the proprietor of Doyle's Corner in Phibsborough. Doyle renamed the house Balnagowan (sometimes spelt Bealnagown) after his former home in Rathmines. The Petty family lived in the house from 1953 to 1956, and lastly the Quinn family lived there until 1971 when they sold the house to the semi-state organisation, the Central Fisheries Board.

=== 1971 to now ===
While in use by the Fisheries Board, a number of pre-fabricated cabins were placed on site that damaged the original landscaping, the swimming pool and barbecue area. A single-storey extension was also added around this time.

The house functioned as an office building for the Board until it was sold in 2005. Since 2005, it has been vacant and falling into disrepair. Since 2011, the house has been listed on Dublin city's Record of Protected Structures. In 2017 a fire broke out in the outbuildings, but did not reach the main house. It has been recorded that much of the house's original interiors are intact, with the Fisheries Board leaving many of the features and boarding in others. The structure is declining, with damage recorded over time to the fabric of the building. It has also been the site of anti-social behaviour. The building was the site for a squat which functioned for two weeks before the inhabitants were evicted. It was recorded as part of the National Inventory of Architectural Heritage in 2018.

== Architecture ==
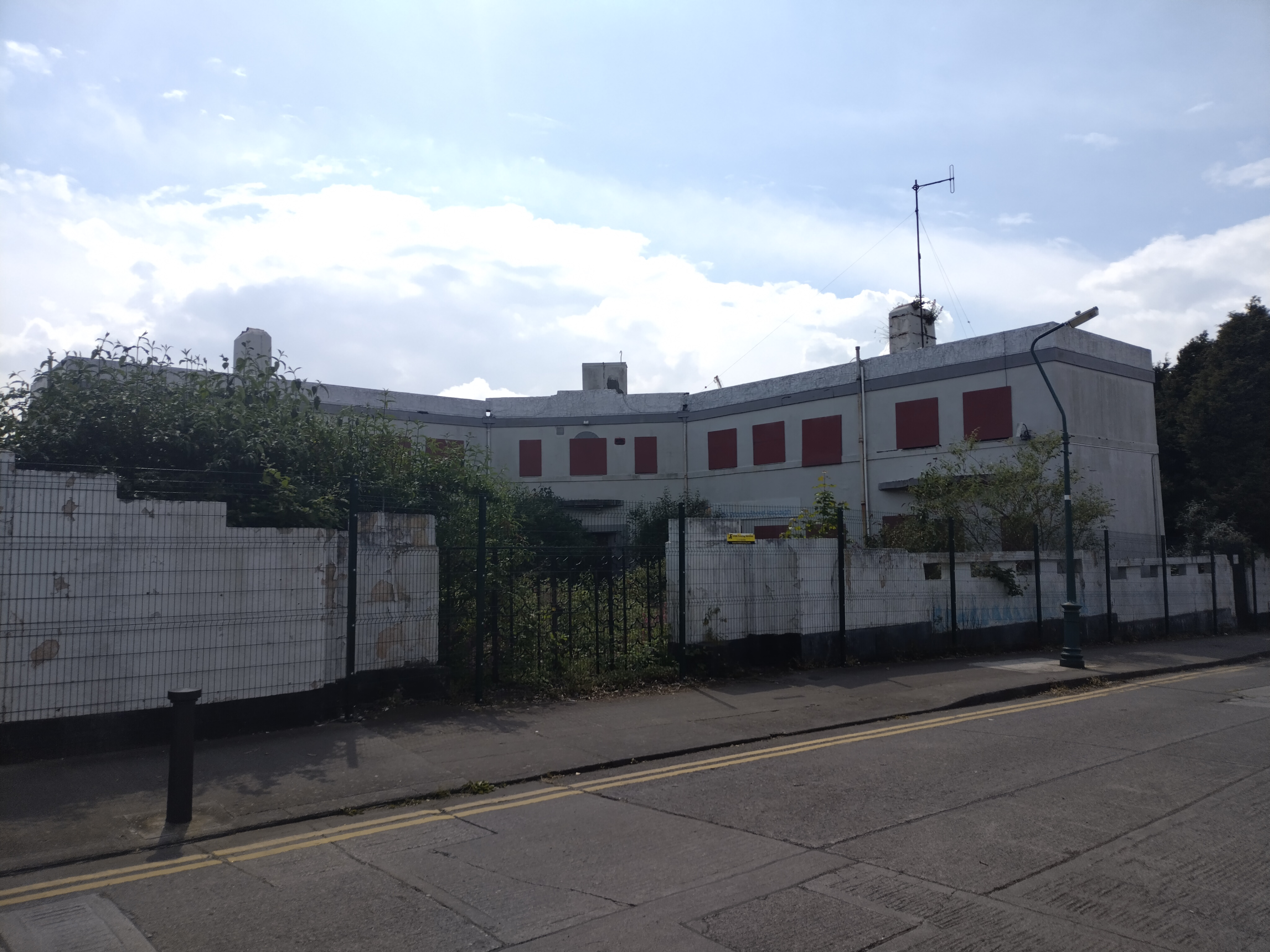
Balnagowan House in 2025

The house has two stories with a flat roof on a v-shaped plan, consisting of two wings set at a 90 degree angle to each other coming off a central section. The flat roof is hidden behind a raised parapet. Consistent with the international style, the exterior was rendered in Snowcrete was painted white. Internally, the roof had suspended ceilings offering insulation. It featured large steel frame windows and a loggia on the second floor which was accessible from two bedrooms. It was built with pre-cast concrete blocks, fitted with central heating, an internal telephone system, and a serving hatch from the kitchen to the dining room with electric hotplates amongst many other modern conveniences which anticipated a home with fewer servants. The floors are timber fitted over reinforced concrete with heating pipes. The interior had oak panelling and chrome light switches, in keeping with the modernist style. A swimming pool and tennis courts were later added the grounds. The hallway features a rectilinear stairs with lights set into the newel posts. To add a noise-dampening effect, one toilet off the hall had two doors. Alongside other one-off homes built during this time in Clontarf and Dun Laoghaire, this building has a clear modernist style that was reflected in public buildings built during this period.

The Irish Times described the house as a "Novel Concrete House Building in Dublin" on 21 January 1932, and detailed how the home was the product of mass-produced and pre-fabricated materials not by using tradespeople. It bears a strong resemblance to the house High and Over by Amyas Connell at Amersham, Buckinghamshire.
