= Paddy McQuaid =

Irish road racing cyclist, president of the national cycling federation

Patrick McQuaid is a former Irish road racing cyclist and later national cycling sport administrator. From Dungannon, County Tyrone, Northern Ireland, he lived from 1947 in Dublin. From a family prominent in Irish cycling, he raced competitively, co-founded a cycle racing club in Dublin and served on the committee of the national cycling federation, including a decade as president.

== Life ==
McQuaid was born in Dungannon, Co. Tyrone, with one younger brother and a sister. He moved to Dublin in 1947 and established a general store in the small district of Ballygall, between Glasnevin and Finglas in the northwestern Dublin suburbs, with his brother Jim opening a greengrocery across the road a year later.

McQuaid and his brother Jim had already been racing in Northern Ireland, and continued in their new home. Paddy McQuaid raced competitively from the 1940s to the 1950s.

Paddy and Jim McQuaid founded a cycle racing club, Emerald Cycling Club (sometimes Emerald Cycle Racing Club), in late 1949. They kept it small and selective, aiming for high race performance; the club survived until the late 1990s, racing nationally and internationally.

McQuaid became involved in the national administration of cycling in 1956, elected as vice-president of the internationally-recognised cycling federation, the CRÉ, for 1957. He ran for the national presidency in 1958, and was elected, and he continued in that role for about a decade, until the planned dissolution of the organisation in October 1967.

He ran for the presidency in the new national federation, the ICF. The ICF contained all former CRÉ (and some NCA) clubs, and McQuaid had helped to develop it in November 1967. However, he lost the presidency bid to Karl McCarthy, and was then elected vice-president, a position he held for another ten years. McQuaid was involved in unity efforts within Irish cycling for more than 20 years.

== Personal life ==
McQuaid lived in Ballygall, between Glasnevin and Finglas, on moving to Dublin. His brother, Jim, also volunteered for many roles in Irish cycling over decades until his death in 1991. Six of Paddy McQuaid's nephews competed internationally, including at the Olympics; the eldest, Pat, had a short professional career, as well as a longer career in coaching and administration, including four years as Irish federation president and eight years as the head of the world governing body for cycling.
