= St Kevin's College, Dublin =

Boys secondary school in Ballygall, Dublin

Coordinates: 53°23′7.624″N 6°16′38.568″W

- Irish: Coláiste Chaomhín

Information
- Religious affiliation: Roman Catholic
- Established: 1967
- Founders: Congregation of Christian Brothers
- Enrollment: 516 (2024)

St. Kevin's College (Irish Coláiste Chaomhín) is a Roman Catholic day secondary school for boys in Glasnevin, Dublin, Ireland. The school was founded in 1967 by the Christian Brothers and is now under the trusteeship of the Edmund Rice Schools Trust. It is dedicated to St. Kevin of Glendalough, the patron saint of Dublin, and is built on lands previously owned by the Ball family in the 16th century. As of 2024, the principal was Eoghan Rooney and the school had 516 students enrolled.

St. Kevin's offers the Junior Certificate, an optional Transition Year, the Leaving Certificate, Leaving Certificate Applied and the Leaving Certificate Vocational Programme. It participates in the Delivering Equality of Opportunity in Schools initiative and the School Completion Programme. A Department of Education report in 2014 described the quality of teaching and learning at the school as "good or very good [..] with some instances of excellent practice".

== Notable alumni ==
=== Arts, humanities and Public Life ===
- Tom Clonan, former Captain in the Irish Army, academic, journalist and senator
- Gavin Friday, musician and actor
- James O'Higgins Norman, professor and author

=== Sports ===
- Stephen Kelly, former professional footballer (Tottenham Hotspur, Fulham and Republic of Ireland)
- James McCarthy, Dublin Senior Gaelic footballer
- David O'Leary, manager and former professional footballer (Arsenal and Republic of Ireland)
- Pierce O'Leary, former professional footballer (Shamrock Rovers, Celtic and Republic of Ireland)
- Keith O'Neill, former professional footballer (Coventry City and Republic of Ireland)
- Barney Rock, former Dublin Senior Gaelic footballer
- Paul McQuaid, former international cyclist, winner of Rás Tailteann
