= Anne Kernan =

Irish particle physicist (1933–2020)

- Born: 15 January 1933; Dublin, Ireland
- Died: 11 May 2020 (aged 87); Panama City Beach, Florida

Anne Kernan (15 January 1933 – 11 May 2020) was an Irish particle physicist.

== Early life and education ==
Kernan was born in 1933 to Annie Connor and Frederick Kernan in Glasnevin. She was the second of four children including Denis, Gerard, and Una. Kernan was educated in the Dominican College on Eccles St, because they had a class in physics. She went on to study physics at University College Dublin graduating with first-class honours in 1952. Kernan was the only woman in the class. After graduation Kernan went on to complete her PhD in physics in her alma mater in 1957. Kernan worked there as a lecturer for four years. She also worked in the University of Rochester.

Kernan won a post-doctoral scholarship at the Lawrence Radiation Laboratory at the University of California at Berkeley. Her next role was at the Stanford Linear Accelerator Center. Finally in 1967, she joined the Department of Physics at the University of California, Riverside. She went on to become chair of the physics department, vice chancellor for research and dean of the graduate division. In each case Kernan was the first woman in all these roles.

== Career ==
In 1983, Kernan worked with Professor Carlo Rubbia and Dr Simon van der Meer. She led the US team on the CERN international Nobel-prize winning experiment to discover the two sub-atomic particles, W and Z bosons. Kernan was invited to the Nobel Prize ceremony in Stockholm. Kernan was part of the team that went on to discover the top quark in 1995. She had been working as part of the DZero experiment at the Tevatron collider at the Fermi National Accelerator Laboratory near Chicago since 1986.

Kernan was a fellow of the American Physical Society and the American Association for the Advancement of Science. She was a supporter of women in STEM. She was a member of the American Physics Society committee on the status of women in physics.

When Kernan retired she moved to Danvers, Massachusetts to live with her sister and then to Panama City Beach in Florida where she died in 2020.
