= Clans of Ireland =

Membership organisation for Irish clans

Clans of Ireland Finte na hÉireann
- Formation: 1989; 37 years ago
- Founder: Rory O'Connor Kerry
- Type: Irish clans Irish genealogy Gaelic culture
- Website: www.clansofireland.ie

Clans of Ireland (Irish: Finte na hÉireann) is an Irish membership organisation established to represent and co-ordinate the activities of member Irish clans.

It is a voluntary non-profit organisation and registered charity dedicated to supporting clans through research, promoting clan rallies, and advancing DNA studies.

== Background and foundation ==
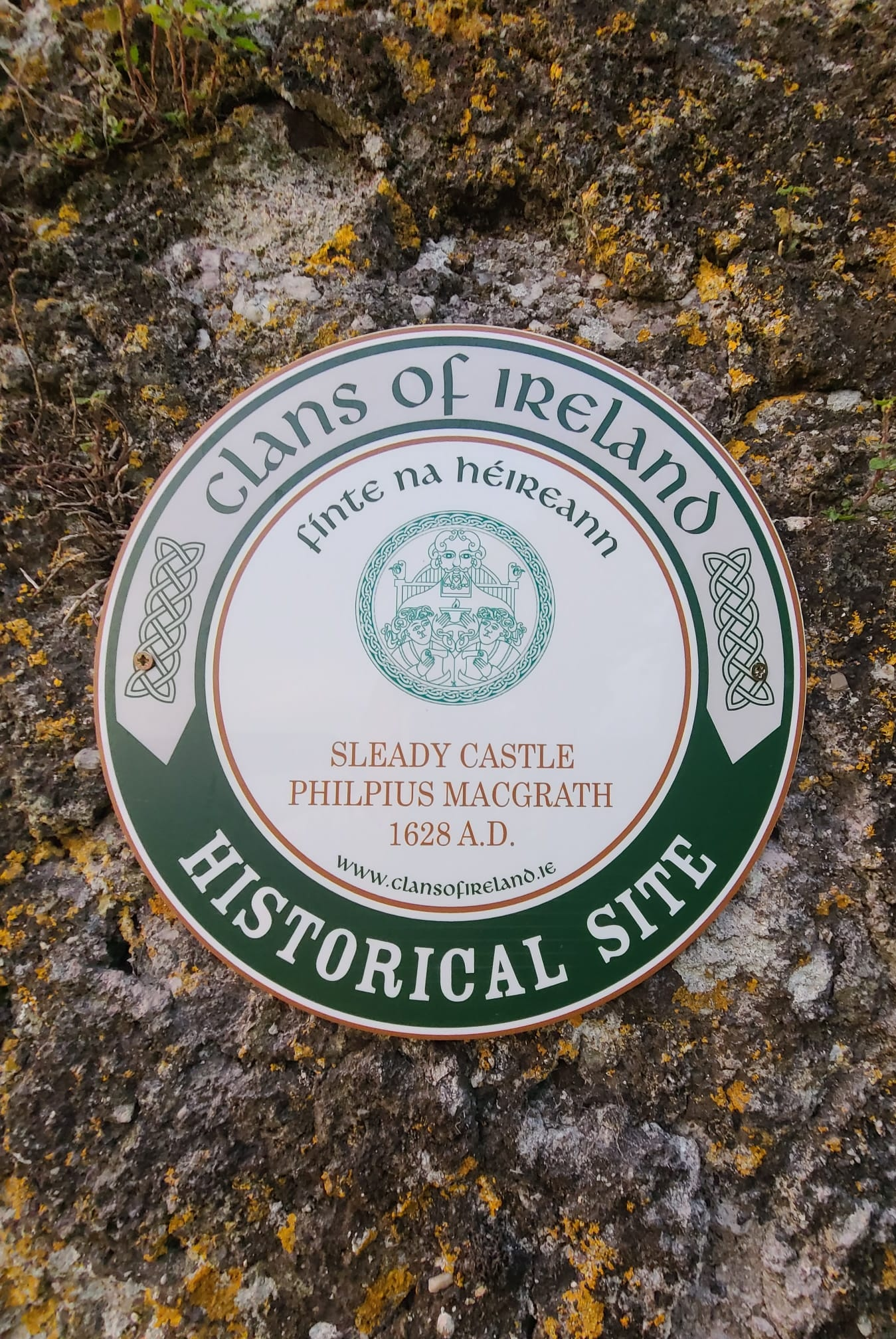
A Clans of Ireland plaque at Sleady Castle

Clans of Ireland was founded in 1989. The organisation, which is registered as a charity in Ireland, had income of approximately €8,000 EUR, and expenditure of approximately €9,000, in 2023.

== Order of Clans of Ireland ==
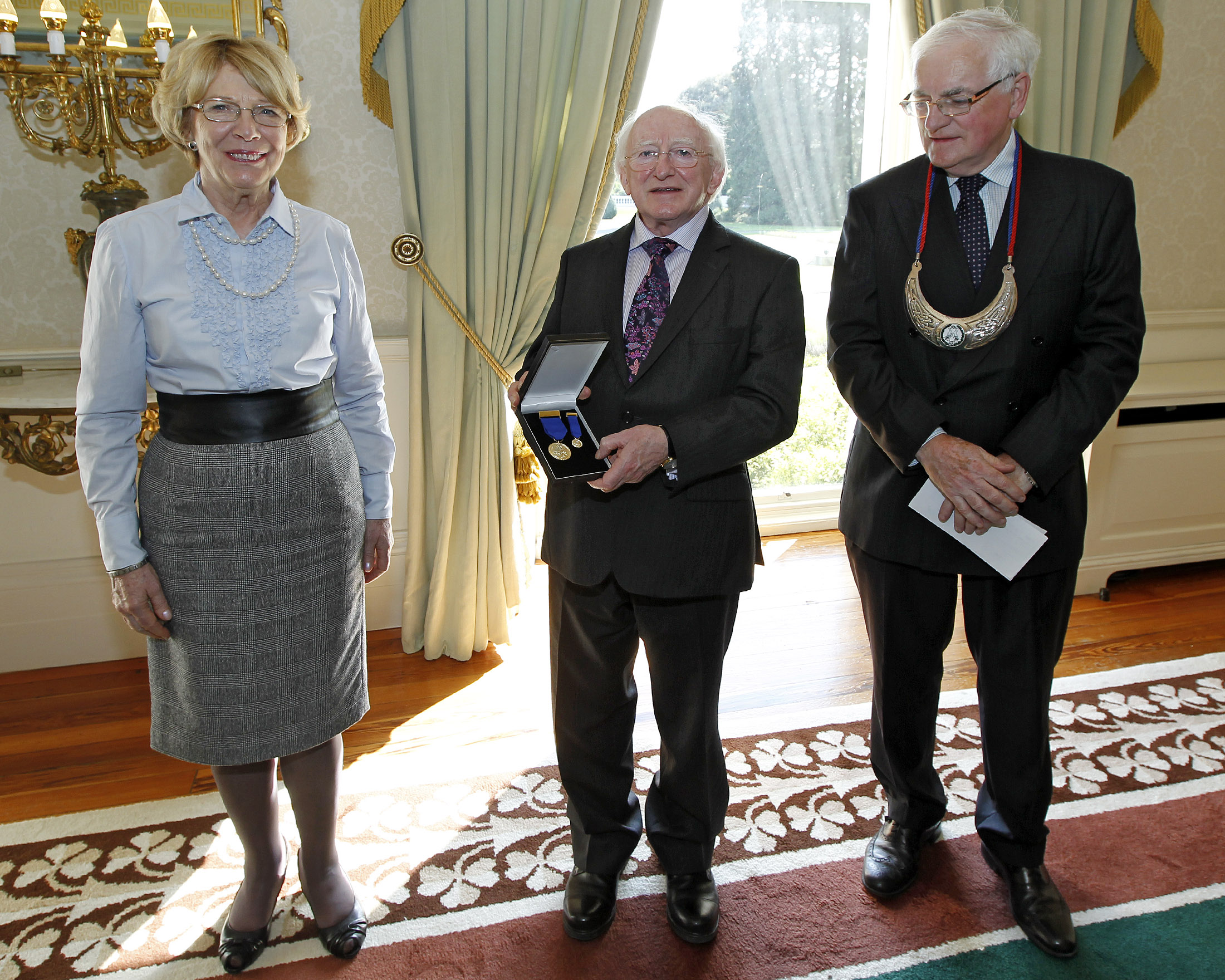
Michael D. Higgins, patron of the Order of Clans of Ireland from 2012, receives his insignia from Michael J. Egan, chair of Clans of Ireland, in May 2012

In 2010, Clans of Ireland instituted the "Order of Clans of Ireland", an award to honour individuals who contributed to Irish culture and heritage or who have brought honour to their clan. The names of the successful nominations are published on 17 March, (St Patrick's Day). A number of past recipients have been inducted at a ceremony in Dublin, during April, when they received their insignia. Inductees are designated as Companions of the Order of Clans of Ireland, or in Irish Compánach Fhinte na hÉireann.

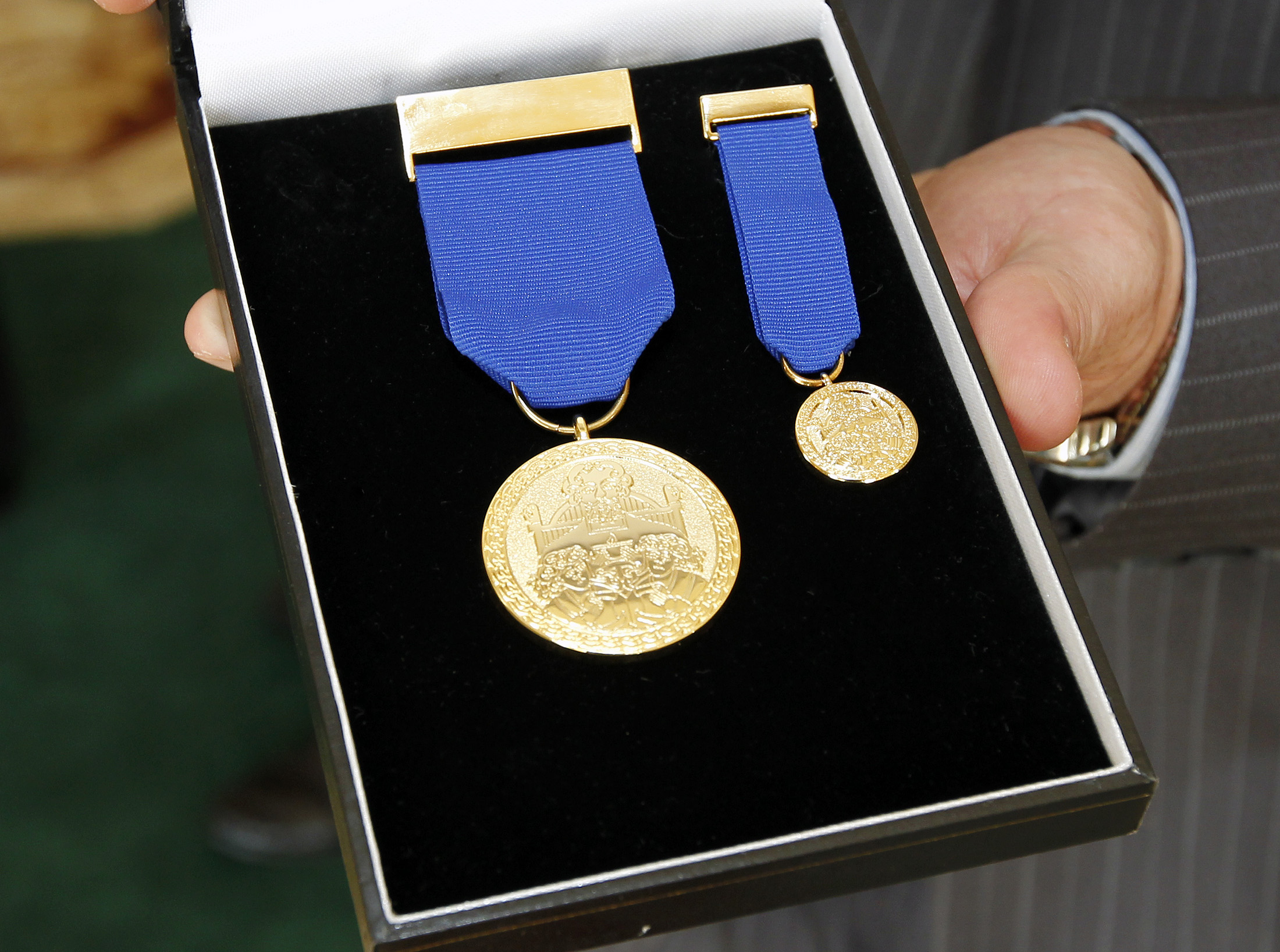
Breast Insignia and Miniature of the Order of Clans of Ireland

The order's insignia consists of a gold medal under an azure blue ribbon on a gold bar.

=== Companions of the Order (members) ===
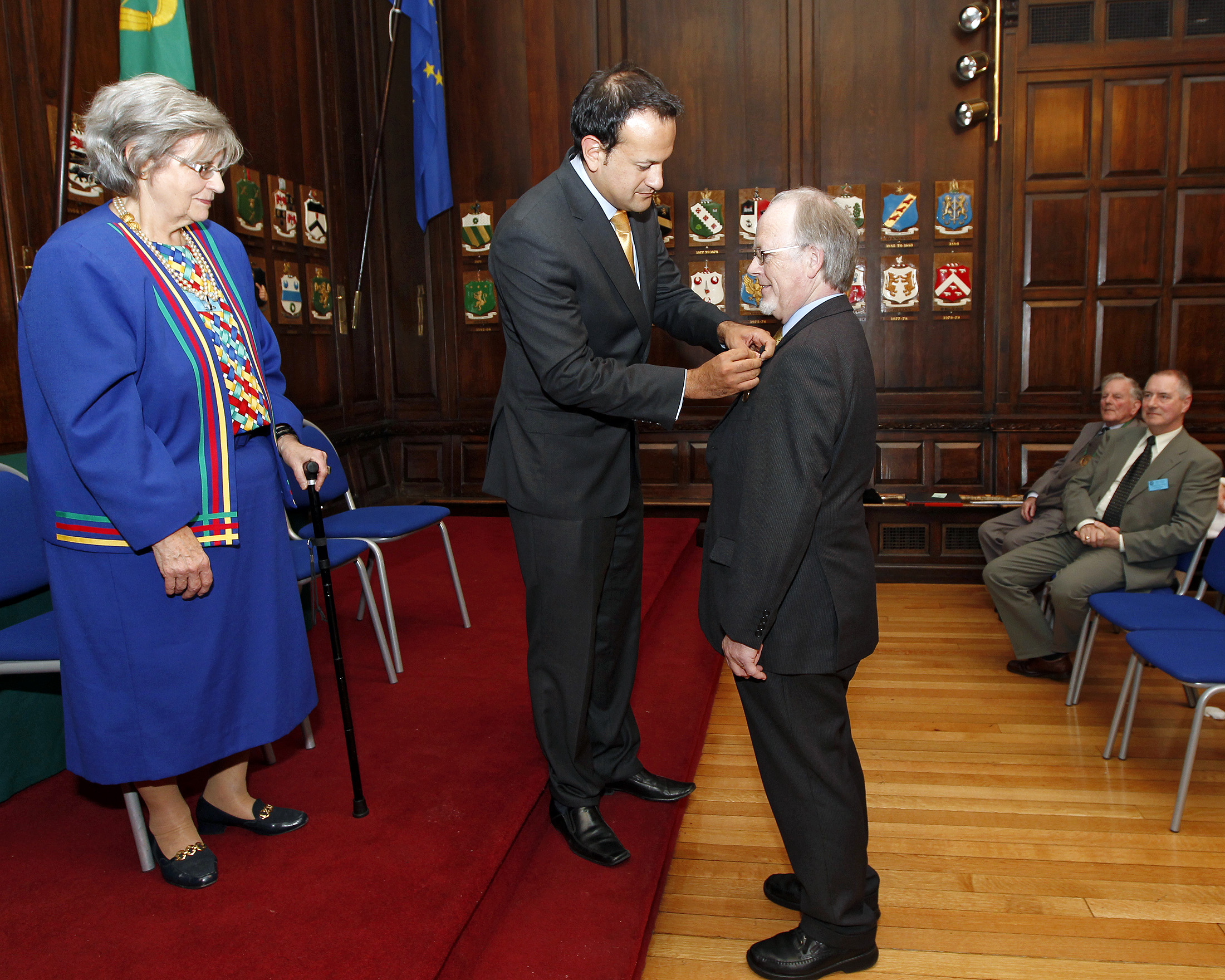
Leo Varadkar presenting the Order of Clans of Ireland to Nollaig Ó Muraíle at the Mansion House, Dublin

From 2011 to 2024, between one and seven appointments were made to the order annually. There were no appointments in 2015, 2021, 2022 or 2023.

Notable past inductees have included:

- (2011) James O'Higgins Norman, author and academic at Dublin City University
- (2012) Michael D. Higgins, President of Ireland, 2011–2025
- (2012) Nollaig Ó Muraíle RIA, author and academic at NUIG who transcribed and translated MacFhirbhisigh's Great Book of Irish Genealogies
- (2013) Mary McAleese, President of Ireland, 1997–2011
- (2013) Pádraig Ó Fiannachta, Irish-language scholar, poet and priest.

== See also ==
- Standing Council of Irish Chiefs and Chieftains
