= Pádraig Ó Fiannachta =

- Born: 1927; Ballymore, County Kerry, Ireland
- Died: 15 July 2016 (aged 88–89); Dingle, County Kerry
- Education: Maynooth College
- Known for: Academia
- Notable work: An Bíobla Naofa
- Parent(s): John Ó Fiannachta, Nora Houlihan
- Relatives: Nuala Ní Dhomhnaill

Pádraig Ó Fiannachta (1927 – 15 July 2016) was an Irish-language scholar, poet and priest from the Kerry Gaeltacht. He is perhaps best known for producing a translation of the Christian Bible into the Irish language.

== Biography ==
Ó Fiannachta studied at Maynooth, University College Cork and All Hallows, Clonliffe College. He was ordained a priest in All Hallows College in 1953.

He served for some time as a priest in Wales, where he became a good friend of Waldo Williams, prior to returning to Maynooth College, where he became professor of early Irish in 1960 as well as Welsh Language lecturer. He was made professor of Modern Irish at Maynooth in 1982 and was awarded the Douglas Hyde prize for literature in 1969.

He translated and edited an Irish-language version of the Bible – An Bíobla Naofa which was published in 1982.

In Léim an Dá Mhíle (1999); bilingual Irish/English edition (2005), he portrays the public life of Jesus as lived, not in Galilee, but in the Dingle peninsula.

He retired from Maynooth in 1992, returning to Dingle as parish priest. In 1998 he was awarded the title monsignor by Pope John Paul II. In 2013, he was made a Companion of the Clans of Ireland. In 2015 he was awarded the American Irish Historical Society's Cultural Award.

He was involved in many Dingle events such as the blessing of the boats and participated in the Dingle/Daingean Uí Chúis name-change debate.

He died in Dingle on 15 July 2016 at the age of 89 and is buried in the grounds of Séipéal Chaitlíona in Ventry.

== Publications ==
- An Bíobla Naofa, translated and edited by Padraig Ó Fiannachta (1982)
- Táin Bó Cuailnge (hardcover) by Pádraig Ó Fiannachta (Dublin Institute for Advanced Studies 1966)
- Rúin (1969)
- Feoirlingi Fileata (1972)
- Sciuird chun na Rúise (1973)
- Ó Chorr na Móna go Bangalore (1975)
- Donn Bo (1976)
- Seanghaeilge Gan Dua (1981)
- Deora Dé (1987)
- Léim An Dá Mile (1999)
- Irisleabhar Mha Nuad, Pádraig Ó Fiannachta
- Prayers from the Irish Tradition by Pádraig Ó Fiannachta, English translation by Desmond Forristal Columba Press (1 Jan 2000)
- Mil Bhaile Aimín Treaint (2012)
- Triad of poetry and stories, written by Jane Beatrice Ejim, translated by Pádraig Ó Fiannachta.
