= National Anti-Bullying Centre =

Facility associated with Dublin City University

The National Anti-Bullying Research and Resource Centre (ABC) is a research and resource facility at Dublin City University, Ireland. The Centre is normally referred to as the Anti-Bullying Centre or ABC.

A centre dedicated to the study of bullying behaviour had previously existed at Trinity College Dublin where it was founded in 1996 by Professor Mona O'Moore at the School of Education, Trinity College Dublin. This Centre closed in 2011/12 upon the retirement of Prof. O'Moore from the full-time faculty at Trinity.

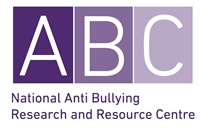
The official corporate logo for the National Anti-Bullying Research and Resource Centre Dublin City University.

== Designation as National Centre ==
In January 2014, following the appointment of Prof. O'Moore as an adjunct Professor at Dublin City University, an Anti-Bullying Centre opened at Dublin City University where it is under the academic leadership of Dr. James O'Higgins Norman.

In May 2014, the Centre was re-launched as the National Anti-Bullying Research and Resource Centre by the Minister for Education and Skills Ruairí Quinn TD and the Tánaiste Éamon Gilmore TD at a ceremony in Dublin City University. The Minister also announced on the same day that his Department would provide funding to the Anti-Bullying Centre.

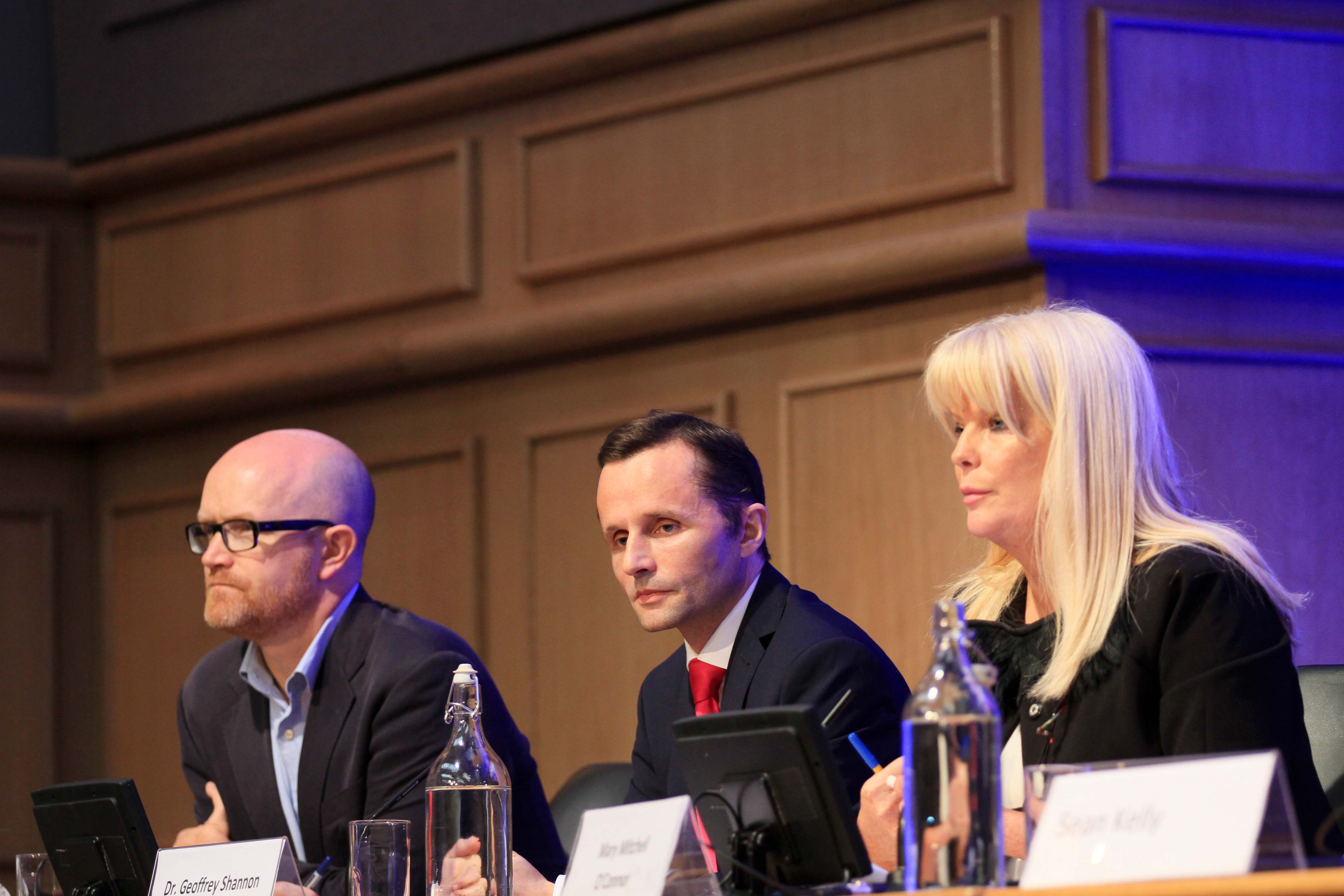
1st National Cyberbullying Conference, Speakers: Nick Miller (Facebook), Geoffrey Shannon (Barrister-at-Law) and Mary Mitchell O'Connor TD

The aims of the Centre are:

- To conduct research into the multi-level and multi-factorial nature of workplace and school bullying.
- The creation of greater awareness and understanding of bullying behaviour.
- The promotion of ways and means by which bullying behaviour may be prevented or reduced.
- To support the implementation of the National Action Plan on Bullying.

In September 2014, the Centre hosted the 1st National Cyberbullying Conference at Dublin Castle. The conference was supported by the Government of Ireland and was attended by representatives from all of the major social networks.

== Research Activity ==
Researchers currently at the Centre undertook and published the first national studies on school, workplace, and homophobic bullying in Ireland and have contributed to ongoing initiatives to prevent and reduce bullying behaviour in schools, organisations and businesses including the Report of the Taskforce on Bullying in the Workplace (2000) and the National Action Plan on Bullying (2013).

The Centre's staff has received substantial funding from the Calouste Gulbenkian Foundation, the Department of Education, the Health & Safety Authority, the Irish Research Council, the Equality Authority and from the EU for research projects in the area of school bullying and violence. Staff at ABC have participated in more than 13 EU-funded research projects on bullying and cyberbullying prevention.
