= Alexander Strain =

Irish builder and property developer

- Born: c. 1877; Markethill, County Armagh, Ireland
- Died: 18 September 1943 (aged 65–66); Cremore Park, Dublin

Alexander Strain (c. 1877 – 18 September 1943) was an Irish builder and property developer in Dublin in the early twentieth century.

== Early life and family ==
Alexander Strain was born around 1877 in Markethill, County Armagh. His parents were builder Robert Douglas and Margaret Strain (née McFadden). He was their eldest son. Strain moved to Dublin in 1893, where he was employed at a timber dealership in Rathmines. He married Kathleen Parr in 1898, who was from Dublin. They had 4 daughters, Madge, Belinda, Caroline, and May. He was a Presbyterian, and an active member of the church in Dublin. He served as the chair of the board of governors of Drumcondra Hospital, supported the Marrowbone Lane fund, and was a governor of the Adelaide Hospital. Strain died suddenly at home in Cremore Park on 18 September 1943.

One of Strain's daughters married George Linzell, who also built many houses in Dublin from the late 1920s.

== Career ==
Soon after his moved to Dublin, Strain noticed the potential to build houses on the northern outskirts of Dublin. He borrowed capital to buy 10 acres in 1896 in the areas known as Daneswell and Cross Guns. He started construction on Iona Road, Drumcondra in 1904, building to a high quality with spacious homes that were in stark contrast to the existing local housing stock. He built houses on streets including Iona Road, Iona Drive, Lindsay Road, and Lindsay Crescent from 1904 to 1914. He and his family would live in the houses he built, leading to them moving at least 16 times around the Drumcondra and Glasnevin area. The housing market went into decline during World War I, and during the Easter Rising a number of the properties Strain owned on Lower Sackville Street appear to have been damaged. He began to build again from the mid-1920s, at locations including Hollybank Road, Cliftonville Road, and the Cremore estate. Cremore was named for the townland in County Armagh that his father was from. With his family, Strain settled in Cremore Park in 1930, where he built a number of houses for his family. The name 'Cremore' was taken from a Presbyterian Congregation near Poyntzpass in County Armagh, attended by a number of his relations, as the townland name in which the Meeting House is situated uses the alternative anglicisation of the Irish Croí Mór, 'Crewmore'.

Strain developed a reputation for his customised houses with special features, and the high standards he maintained in the inter-war years when funds and materials were in short supply. He was also lauded for his honest business practices. While his houses were uniform from the outside, and were similar in style to others built elsewhere in the city, the interiors and some decorative exterior features were modified to the clients requirements. These customisations included glazed exterior bricks, different sill and lintel profiles, varying iron railing designs, and unique stained glass window panels in the doors. In response to changing economic and social trends in the 1920s he adapted his designs, reducing the space for servants and accommodating private cars.

His houses were marketed very successfully as "Strain-built", and this has since been co-opted by estate agents as a descriptor for any high-quality home of the era in Drumcondra and Glasnevin. Roughly half of the houses on Iona Road and Lindsay Road can be definitely attributed to Strain, such as 34, 66, 68, and 76 Iona Road and 24 Cremore Park. He owned a large property portfolio, with some areas such as Tyrconnell Road and Jamestown Road, Inchicore which were developed in the 1930s. Given the lower quality of these buildings, it is unlikely he was involved in their construction. Strain was an advocate for modern town planning, and was the first chairman of the Dublin and District Housebuilders' Association after its establishment in 1932.
