= Dublin Wheelers =

Bicycle racing and touring club in Dublin, Ireland

Team information
- Registered: Ireland
- Founded: 1933 by Eric Mason, David Perkins, Jim Doogue, Joe Walsh, Tommy & Leo McManmon
- Discipline: Road
- Status: Amateur

Dublin Wheelers is a cycling club operating from the northside of Dublin, Ireland since 1933. As of 2022, it is based in Santry.

== History ==
The club was established in 1933 by a group of six friends on a weekend away cycling in Rostrevor, County Down. The club founders were Eric Mason, David Perkins, Jim Doogue, Joe Walsh, Tommy and Leo McManmon.

At peak a couple of hundred riders would depart from outside the offices of the Irish Press in Dublin. A touring section later developed, and the club ran well-attended time trials. The club was one of only 2-3 Irish cycling clubs to have a fixed base, in its case a converted bus on a site in Ashtown, near the Phoenix Park.

== Notable members ==
The most notable past member of the club is the great Shay Elliott who won the Irish National Cycling Championships in 1952 and 1954. He was the first Irish person to embark on a professional career, in 1956, and won stages in the three big tours of France, Italy and Spain. In 1962 he finished 2nd in the World Championship Road Race in Salo and in 1963 he was the first Irish man to wear the Yellow Jersey in the Tour de France. To great excitement at the time he heroically held on to the Jersey for three days. In recognition of his great achievements he was awarded honorary life membership of Dublin Wheelers.

Another member was Christy Kimmage, who rode in the World Championships, and three of whose family, including Paul Kimmage were also active in Irish cycling, while another member, Willie Marks, was active from 1936 to 2014 (aged 95).

Members of the club also played a strong role in the national cycling bodies, CRE and later the Irish Cycling Federation, which after later mergers now operates as Cycling Ireland, notably Steve Lawless as general secretary and later president, Donal O'Connell as a race planner and selector, Joe Doyle as national treasurer for more than a decade, and Ian Gallahar as PR Officer, all also serving as race officials. Donal O’Connell and Paddy McInerney co-founded the veterans association, which O’Connell led for many years. Others organised national races.

== Today ==
Dublin Wheelers is active in Irish club bicycle racing, and has redeveloped a touring section. The club welcomes new members and the rise in cycling's popularity saw it grow from under 50 to around 90 between 2007 and 2012, and further since.

== Honours ==
| Year | Competition | Name | Medal |
| 1952 and 1954 | Irish National Cycling Championships | Seamus Elliott | Gold |
| 1962 | Irish National Cycling Championships | Christy Kimmage | Gold |
| 1993 | Rás Tailteann | Eamonn Byrne | Gold |
| 2007 | Irish Veterans Cyclists Association Sunday League | Jimmy Lally | Silver |
