= James O'Higgins Norman =

Former priest, now academic working on education and bullying

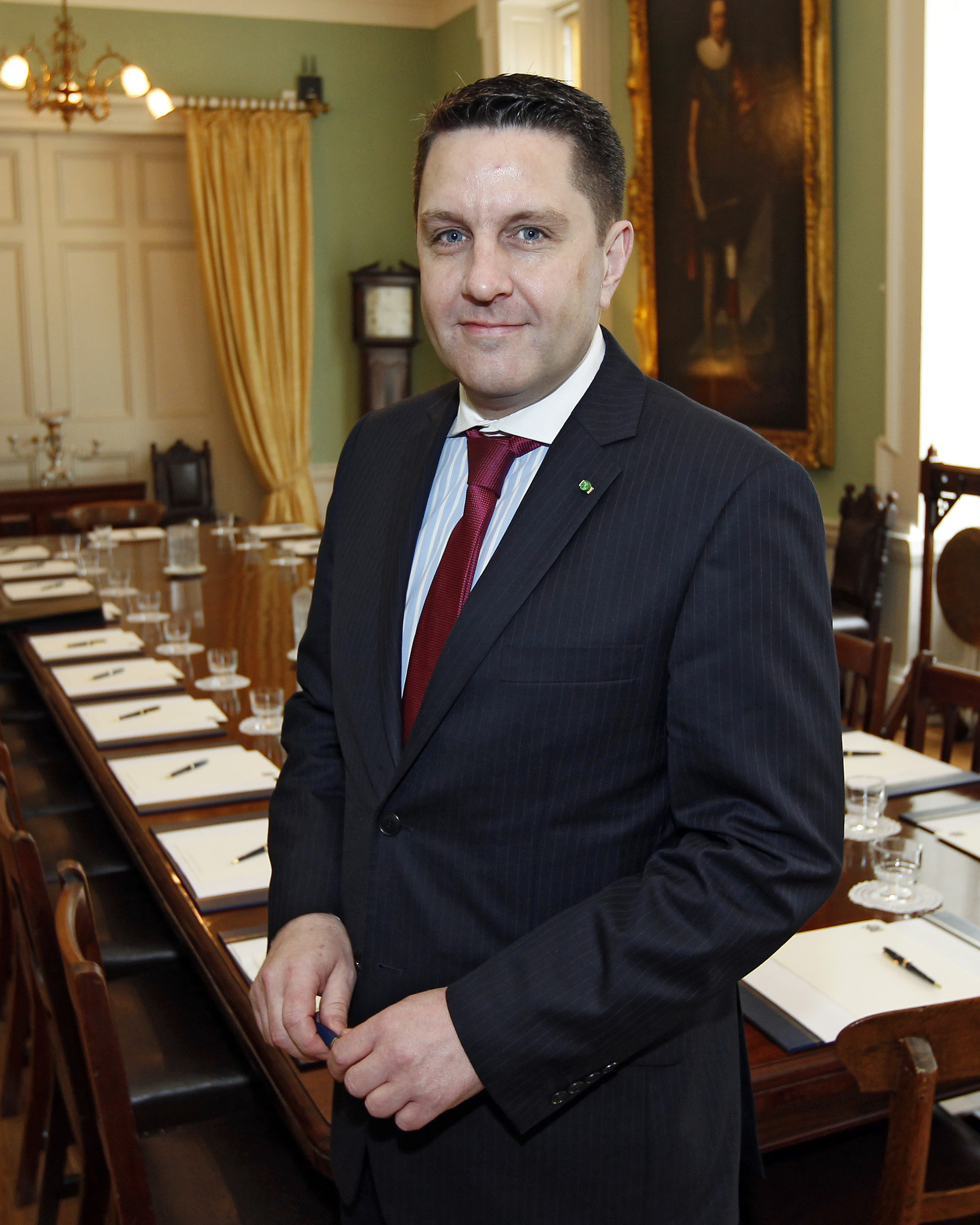
- James O'Higgins Norman at the Mansion House, Dublin, 2012
- Born: 1968 (age 57–58); Dublin, Ireland
- Education: St Kevin's College

James O'Higgins Norman PC, OStJ, FRSA holds the UNESCO Chair on Tackling Bullying in Schools and Cyberspace at Dublin City University. He is the director of the National Anti-Bullying Research and Resource Centre, and a member of the Government of Ireland Advisory Council on Online Safety.

== Early life and education ==
O'Higgins Norman was born in Dublin, Ireland. He attended secondary school at St Kevin's College in Glasnevin.

He holds a degree in Divinity from Pontifical University of Saint Thomas Aquinas in Rome (1994), a Higher Diploma in Education from University College Dublin (1996) and a Master's degree in Education from the National University of Ireland, Maynooth (1999).

== Career ==
In 2000, he took up a position as a lecturer in the Mater Dei Institute of Education, Dublin, Ireland, where he led research on pastoral care in second level schools. While there he authored the book entitled Ethos and Education in Ireland (2003) (New York: Peter Lang) in which he argued that the Catholic Church had a majority share in the control and management of schools in Ireland and that the church and state would need to reconsider this position in the light of the emerging diversity in Irish society. These views were upheld in 2006 when Archbishop Martin of Dublin called on the state to consider alternative patrons for schools and in 2011 when Ruairí Quinn, Minister for Education and Skills, established a special commission to examine how some schools could be transferred from the patronage of the Catholic Church to other bodies.

Dr. James O'Higgins-Norman with Northern Ireland Minister for Education Caitríona Ruane

In 2003, he was awarded a research grant to examine homophobic bullying in Irish second-level schools. Between 2004 and 2008 he published several reports and two books revealing the extent of the issue in Ireland. In 2005 he became an associate professor at the School of Education Studies in Dublin City University where his research led to the launch in October 2006 of the "Making Our Schools Safe" campaign by the Department of Education and Science. His work on bullying also informed debate in Dáil Éireann and was quoted in a session of the Oireachtas Joint Committee on Education. In May 2012 he was invited to participate in the National Anti-Bullying Forum sponsored by the Government of Ireland at the Department of Education and Skills.

He also extended his work on bullying to include research on cyberbullying, and his research on bullying and education was published in journals including the British Journal of Educational Management, Administration and Leadership.

In 2010 he co-edited the International Handbook on Education for Spirituality, Care and Wellbeing (Netherlands: Springer). In addition to his publications he has also been consulted and deposed on issues related to equality and education. In 2012 he was awarded a research scholarship funded by the US State Department which allowed him to participate in research on alternatives to political violence in Boston College’s Irish Institute.

In 2013 he became Director of the National Anti-Bullying Research Centre, formerly of Trinity College Dublin, which moved to Dublin City University following the retirement of its founder and first director Professor Mona O'Moore. In 2018 he was appointed as the UNESCO Chair on Tackling Bullying in Schools and Cyberbspace.

== Public life ==
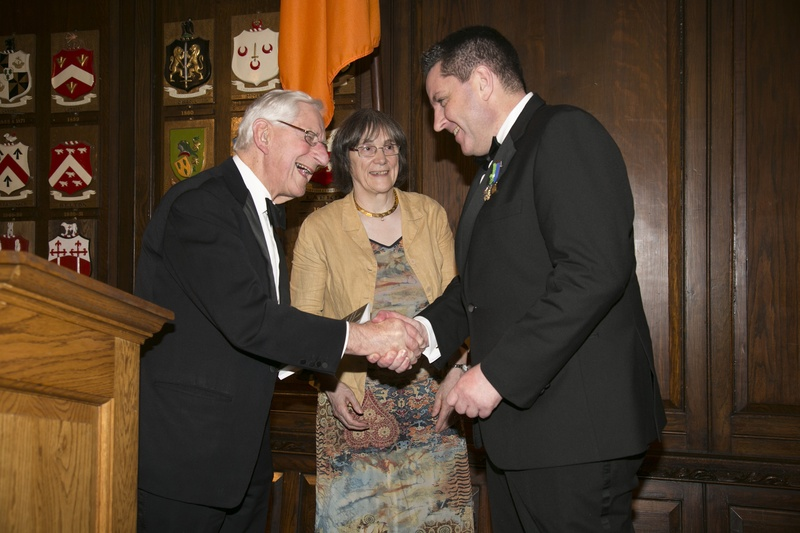
O'Higgins Norman receives a presentation at the Annual Clans Dinner in the Mansion House Dublin, April 2014

He is a former Catholic priest who supported victims and gave evidence to the commission into clerical abuse in the Archdiocese of Dublin.

As an academic at DCU he has contributed to education debates and has been consulted by the media as a spokesperson on educational and social issues.

O'Higgins Norman has served with a number of school boards and voluntary organisations in the Dublin area. In 1986, he was awarded the Father Phelim McCabe Perpetual Endeavour Award for volunteering with local community services. In 1997, he was nominated by Archbishop Desmond Connell to the board of management of Jobstown Community College where he served as chairperson until 2004. He was later nominated by the Edmund Rice Schools Trust (ERST) to the board of management of St. Vincent's CBS, Glasnevin, (2009-2012). He was also chairperson of Schools Across Borders (2010-2012), an Irish Aid funded NGO promoting better relations between young people in areas of conflict. From 2008 to 2014 he was a member of the board of Clans of Ireland and in 2009 became its vice chairperson. In 2010 he was appointed to the Venerable Order of St. John and in 2012 he was appointed an honorary president of St. John Ambulance Castleknock Combined Division in Dublin.

He is reputed to be a descendant of the independence leader Bernardo O'Higgins, regarded as the father of the Chilean nation. In that capacity, he has represented the O'Higgins family before the Chilean Embassy in Dublin.

== Honours and awards ==
O'Higgins Norman has received several awards:

- Queen Elizabeth II, Member of the Most Venerable Order of St. John of Jerusalem (MStJ).
- King Charles III, Officer of the Most Venerable Order of St. John of Jerusalem (OStJ).
- Clans of Ireland, Companion of the Order of Clans of Ireland (CIOM).

== Published works ==
Peer-Reviewed Journals

- O'Higgins Norman, J., Goldrick, M. 2012. Reducing Academic Isolation in Favour of Learning Relationships Through a Virtual Classroom. Journal of Learning Development in Higher Education, 4,
- O'Higgins Norman, J., Connolly, J. 2011. Mimetic Theory and Scapegoating in the Age of Cyberbullying:The Case of Phoebe Prince. Pastoral Care in Education, 29, 4.
- O'Higgins Norman, J., McNamara, G. 2010. Conflicts of Ethos: Issues of Equality in Faith Based Schools. Educational Management Administration and Leadership. (London: Sage).
- O'Higgins Norman, J.Goldrick, M., Harrison, K. 2009. Pedagogy for Diversity: Mediating Between Tradition and Equality in Schools. International Journal of Children's Spirituality, 14, 4.
- O'Higgins Norman, J. 2009. Straight Talking: Explorations on Homosexuality and Homophobia in Secondary Schools in Ireland. Sex Education, 9, 4.
- O'Higgins Norman, J. 2009. Still Catching up: Schools, Sexual Orientation and Homophobia in Ireland. Sexuality And Culture, 13, 1, pp1–16.
- O'Higgins Norman, J. 2008. Equality in the Provision of Social Personal and Health Education in the Republic of Ireland: The Case of Homophobic Bullying? Pastoral Care in Education, 26, 2, pp69–81.
- O'Higgins Norman, J. 2006. Homophobia: A Final Frontier for Tolerance in Religious Education. Journal of Religious Education, 54, 3, pp43–48.
- O'Higgins Norman J. 2005. Homophobic Bullying in Irish Second-Level Schools. Guideline - Newsletter of the Institute of Guidance Counsellors, pp15–17.
- O'Higgins Norman, J. 2003. Teacher Professionalism: The Pastoral Dimension. Oideas, 50, Spring, pp66–78.
- O'Higgins Norman, J. 2002. The School Around the Corner is Not Still the Same: The Need for Pastoral Care in Schools. Search, 25:3,
- O'Higgins Norman, J. 2002. Educational Underachievement: The Contribution of Pastoral Care. Irish Educational Studies, 21:1, Spring, pp33–45.
- O'Higgins Norman, J. 2000. Ethos and the Catholic School. Oideas, 47, Spring, pp66–79.
- O'Higgins Norman, J. 1999. Discipline For Learning. The Furrow, Maynooth.

Selected Books/Reports

- O'Higgins Norman, J., Education Matters, Readings in Pastoral Care for School Chaplains, Guidance Counsellors and Teachers. Dublin, Veritas, 2014.
- O'Higgins Norman, J., Goldrick, M., Harrison, K. (2010) Identifying Good Practice in Addressing Homophobic Bullying in Second-Level Schools. Dublin: The Equality Authority.
- O'Higgins Norman, J. et al. 2009. The International Handbook on Education for Spirituality, Care and Wellbeing. Dordrect: Springer.
- O'Higgins Norman, J. Homophobic Bullying in Irish Secondary Education, Palo Alto, California, Academica Press, 2008.
- O'Higgins Norman, J. Straight Talk: Researching Gay & Lesbian Issues in the School Curriculum, The Centre for Educational Evaluation, DCU, 2006.
- O'Higgins Norman, J. A Survey of Teachers on Homophobic Bullying in Irish Second-Level Schools, Dublin City University, 2005.
- O'Higgins Norman, J (ed.) At the Heart of Education, School Chaplaincy and Pastoral Care, Dublin: Veritas, 2004.
- O'Higgins Norman, James. Ethos and Education in Ireland, New York: Peter Lang, 2003.

Selected Chapters

- O'Higgins Norman, J. 2011. Sociology of Education. B. Walsh. Education Studies. Dublin. Gill and McMillan.
- O'Higgins Norman, J., Hall, E. 2009. Violence and Conflict in Schools: Negotiating Pathways to Wellbeing, International Handbook on Education for Spirituality, Care and Wellbeing. (Dordrect: Springer).
- O'Higgins Norman, J., King, P. 2007. Evaluating the Impact of a State Religious Education Syllabus for the Religious Education Teacher and the School Chaplain. International Handbook of the Religious, Spiritual and Moral Dimensions in Education (Dordrect: Springer).
- O'Higgins Norman, J. 2003. Pastoral Care in Schools: The Role of the School Principal, Chaplain, Guidance Counsellor and Teachers. Re-imagining The Catholic School (Dublin: Veritas).
