= Ian Gallahar =

Irish road racing cyclist, race organiser and commissaire

Ian Gallahar was an Irish road racing cyclist, and later race organiser, and national and international commissaire, involved in the organisation of the sport in Ireland and internationally for more than 30 years.

== Cycling career ==
Gallahar cycled actively with the Dublin Wheelers cycling club in the 1960s and early 1970s, later volunteering in other roles. After retirement from active racing, he managed Irish teams for a number of events, including World Championships.

Having held various club offices, he was nominated by Dublin Wheelers and elected as PRO of the internationally-recognised cycling federation, the ICF, in 1977, a role he held for three years, and on several occasions after that. He later also worked with the Irish Cycling Tripartite Committee, including as PRO there also.

Gallahar participated in race organisation, including the International Women's Two-Day in Dublin in the mid-2000s.

=== Commissaire ===
He trained in the early 1980s for the role of commissaire, the cycling equivalent of referee or umpire, at national level. He then progressed to international qualification, being awarded UCI International Commissaire status, alongside three other Irish candidates, in Colorado in 1986. He performed commissaire duties for races accredited by the international governing body, the UCI, all over the world. He was a member of the Commissaire Panel for the Barcelona Olympics, and was lead commissaire for one of the UK's biggest national cycling events, the Milk Race, in 1992.

Gallahar remained an active commissaire, and a member of Dublin Wheelers, until his death.

== Personal life ==
One of three siblings, Gallahar lived in Glasnevin, near the McQuaid cycling family in Ballygall. He was married to Anne and they had three daughters, Emer, Niamh and Aileen. He died at home 28 February 2012, in his 70s, and was buried in St. Fintan's Cemetery, Sutton.

One of the Dublin Wheelers Cycling Club's annual Open Races was founded, and continues, as a memorial for Gallahar.
