= Willie Marks =

Irish road racing cyclist and sports administrator

William Marks (born 1919 or 1920 in Dublin, Ireland) was an Irish road racing cyclist, and later cycling administrator, and one of the longest-participating club members in Irish cycling, joining the Dublin Wheelers cycling club in 1936, and last serving as a timekeeper 78 years later, in 2014, at the age of 95. He was one of the early leaders of the Dublin Wheelers tour cycling section.

In the late 1950s Marks was elected as vice-president of Ireland's internationally recognised cycling federation, the CRÉ, having previously served a couple of years as an executive committee member. He continued with club roles too, including Dublin Wheelers vice-president. The Dublin Wheelers were very active in national cycling governance in the 1960s and 1970s, with, in 1971–1972 for example, members as general secretary, treasurer, and as road racing and time trial secretaries, as well as organiser of the Tour of Ireland and committee member.

In the mid-1970s, Marks oversaw one of the two major forms of cycle racing in Ireland, as Track Racing Secretary of the national federation.

Marks, who had a sister and brother, lived in Cabra in Dublin. He died 18 August 2015 at St Mary's Hospital in the Phoenix Park, with his funeral in Cabra attended by his siblings, nieces and nephews, and many figures from Irish cycling; he was buried in Drumcondra Cemetery. One of the Dublin Wheelers annual open races is run in his memory.
