= Glasnevin =

Northern suburb of Dublin, Ireland

Glasnevin Glas Naíon (Irish)
- Suburb
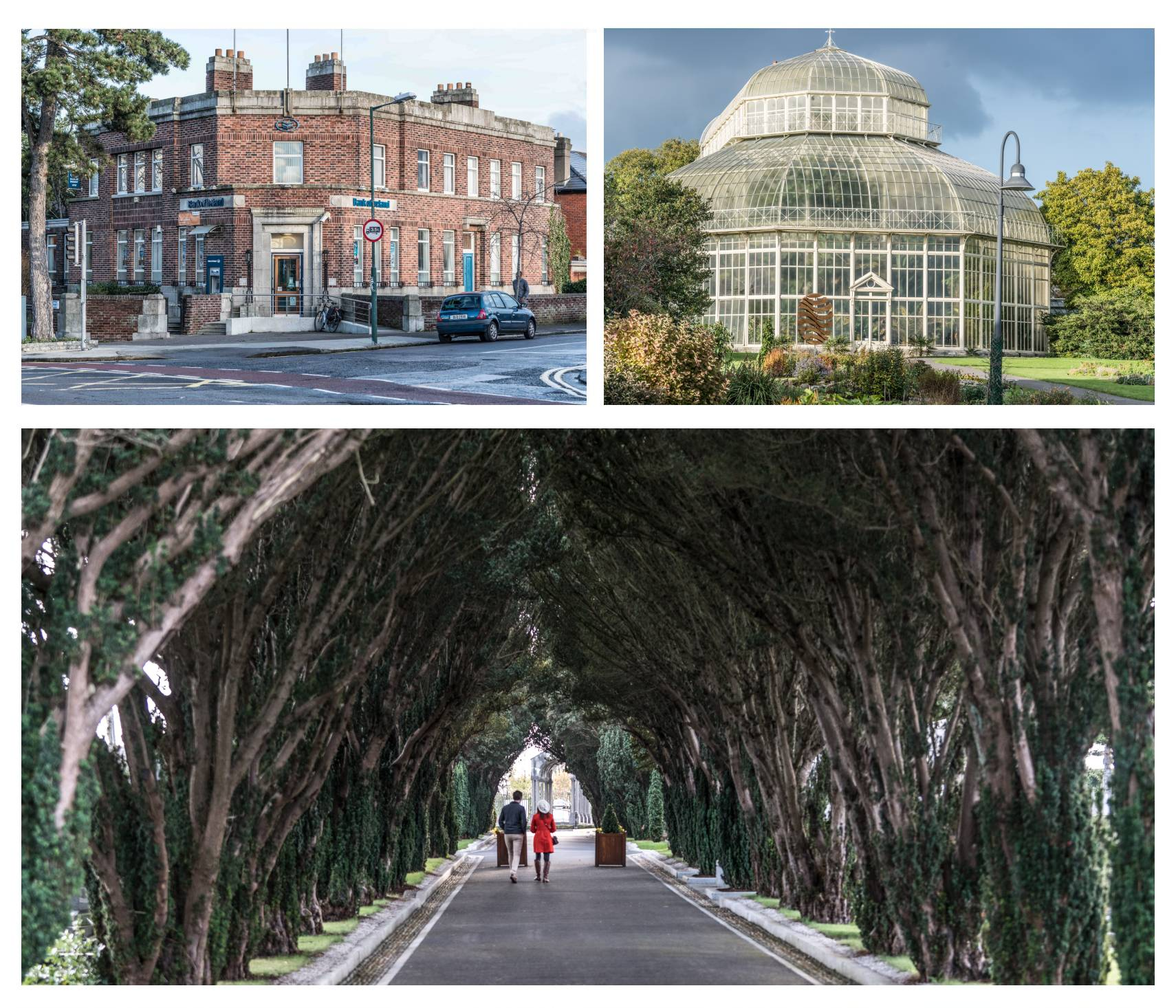
- Glasnevin, Dublin

- Location in Ireland
- Coordinates: 53°22′19″N 6°16′02″W
- Country: Ireland
- Province: Leinster
- County: Dublin
- Local Authority: Dublin City Council
- Eircode routing key: D09, D11

Glasnevin (Irish: Glas Naíon, meaning 'stream of the infants', also known as Glas Naedhe, meaning "stream of O'Naeidhe" after a local stream and an ancient chieftain) is a neighbourhood of Dublin, Ireland, situated on the River Tolka. While primarily residential, Glasnevin is also home to the National Botanic Gardens, Glasnevin Cemetery, the National Meteorological Office, and a range of other state bodies. Dublin City University has its main campus and other facilities in and near the area. Glasnevin is also a civil parish in the ancient barony of Coolock.

== Geography ==
A mainly residential neighbourhood, Glasnevin is located on the Northside of the city of Dublin (about 3 km north of Dublin city centre). It was established on the northern bank of the River Tolka where the stream for which it may be named joins, and now extends north and south of the river. Three watercourses flow into the Tolka in the area. Two streams can be seen near the Catholic "pyramid church", the Claremont Stream or Nevin Stream, flowing south from Poppintree and Jamestown Industrial Estate branches, and what is sometimes called the "Cemetery Drain" coming north from the southern edge of Glasnevin Cemetery. In addition, a major diversion from the Ward River comes from the Ballymun area, joining near the Claremont Stream.

The boundaries of Glasnevin stretch from the Royal Canal to Griffith Avenue and from the Finglas Road to the edges of Drumcondra. It spans the postal districts of Dublin 9 and 11, and is bordered to the northwest by Finglas, northeast by Ballymun and Santry, Whitehall to the east, Phibsborough and Drumcondra to the south and Cabra to the southwest.

== History ==
=== Foundation ===
Glasnevin was reputedly founded by Saint Mobhi (sometimes known as St Berchan) in the sixth (or perhaps fifth) century as a monastery. His monastery continued to be used for many years afterwards – St. Colman is recorded as having paid homage to its founder when he returned from abroad to visit Ireland a century after St Mobhi's death in 544. St. Columba of Iona is thought to have studied under St. Mobhi, but left Glasnevin following an outbreak of plague and journeyed north to open the House at Derry; there is a long street (Iona Road) in Glasnevin named in his honour and the church on Iona Road is called Saint Columba's.

=== Middle Ages ===
A settlement grew up around the monastery, which survived until the Viking invasions in the eighth century. After raids on monasteries at Glendalough and Clondalkin, the monasteries at Glasnevin and Finglas were attacked and destroyed.

By 822 Glasnevin, along with Grangegorman and Clonken or Clonkene (now known as Deansgrange), had become parts of the grange (farm) of Christ Church Cathedral and it seems to have maintained this connection up to the time of the Reformation.

The Battle of Clontarf was fought on the banks of the River Tolka in 1014 (a field called the bloody acre is supposed to be part of the site). The Irish defeated the Danes in a battle, in which 7,000 Danes and 4,000 Irish died.

The 12th century saw the Normans (who had conquered England and Wales in the eleventh century) invade Ireland. As local rulers continued fighting amongst themselves the Norman King of England Henry II was invited to intervene. He arrived in 1171, took control of much land, and then parcelled it out amongst his supporters. Glasnevin ended up under the jurisdiction of Finglas Abbey. Later, Laurence O'Toole, Archbishop of Dublin, took responsibility for Glasnevin and it became the property of the Priory of the Most Holy Trinity (Christ Church Cathedral).

In 1240 a church and tower were reconstructed on the site of the Church of St. Mobhi in the monastery. The returns of the church for 1326 stated that 28 tenants resided in Glasnevin. The church was enlarged in 1346, along with a small hall known as the Manor Hall.

=== Late Middle Ages ===
When King Henry VIII broke from Rome an era of religious repression began. During the Dissolution of the Monasteries, Catholic Church property and land were appropriated to the new Church of Ireland, and monasteries (including the one at Glasnevin) were forcibly closed, later falling into ruin. Glasnevin had at this stage developed as a village, with its principal landmark and focal point being its "bull-ring" noted in 1542.

By 1667 Glasnevin had expanded – but not by very much; it is recorded as containing 24 houses. The development of the village was given a fresh impetus when Sir John Rogerson built his country residence – "The Glen" or "Glasnevin House" – outside the village.

The plantations of Ireland saw the settlement of Protestant English families on land previously held by Catholics. Lands at Glasnevin were leased to such families and a Protestant church was erected there in 1707. It was built on the site of the old Catholic Church and was named after St. Mobhi. The church was largely rebuilt in the mid-18th century. The attached churchyard became a graveyard for both Protestants and Catholics. It is said that Robert Emmet is buried there, this claim being made because once somebody working in the graveyard there dug up a headless body.

=== Early modern times ===
By now Glasnevin was an area for "families of distinction" – in spite of a comment attributed to the Protestant Archbishop of Dublin, William King that "when any couple had a mind to be wicked, they would retire to Glasnevin". In a letter, dated 1725 he described Glasnevin as "the receptacle for thieves and rogues ... The first search when anything was stolen, was there, and when any couple had a mind to retire to be wicked there was their harbour. But since the church was built, and service regularly settled, all these evils are banished. Good houses are built in it, and the place civilised." Glasnevin National School was also built during this period.

=== 19th and 20th centuries ===
In the 1830s, the civil parish population was recorded as 1,001, of whom 559 resided in the village. Glasnevin was described as a parish in the barony of Coolock, pleasantly situated and the residence of many families of distinction.

On 1 June 1832, Charles Lindsay, Bishop of Kildare, and William John released their holdings of Sir John Rogerson's lands at Glasnevin, (including Glasnevin House) to George Hayward Lindsay. This transfer included the sum of 1,500 Pounds Sterling. Although this does not specifically cite the marriage of George Hayward Lindsay to Lady Mary Catherine Gore, George Lindsay almost certainly came into possession of the lands at Glasnevin as a result of his marriage.

When Drumcondra began to rapidly expand in the 1870s, the residents of Glasnevin sought to protect their district and opposed being merged with the neighbouring suburb. One of the objectors was the property owner, Dr Henry Gogarty, the father of the Irish poet, Oliver St. John Gogarty. The combined areas of Drumcondra, Clonliffe and Glasnevin became a separate administrative unit, a township, in 1878. The township was merged into the City of Dublin in 1900, under the Dublin Corporation Act 1900 (63 & 64 Vict. c. cclxiv).

George Hayward Lindsay's eldest son, Lieutenant Colonel Henry Gore Lindsay, was in possession of his father's lands at Glasnevin when the area began to be developed at the beginning of the twentieth century. Gradual development of his lands began in 1903/04 but Glasnevin remained relatively undeveloped until the opening up of the Carroll Estate in 1914, which saw the creation of the redbrick residential roads running down towards Drumcondra. The process was accelerated by Dublin Corporation in the 1920s and the present shape of the suburb was in place by 1930. Among the developers who built estates in the area were Alexander Strain and his son-in-law George Linzell. Linzell built the first individual house built in the international style in Ireland, Balnagowan House, on St. Mobhi Boithrin in the late 1920s.

The start of the 20th century also saw the opening of a short-lived railway station on the Drumcondra and North Dublin Link Railway line from Glasnevin Junction to Connolly Station (then Amiens Street). Glasnevin railway station opened on 1 April 1901 and closed on 1 December 1910.

== Features ==
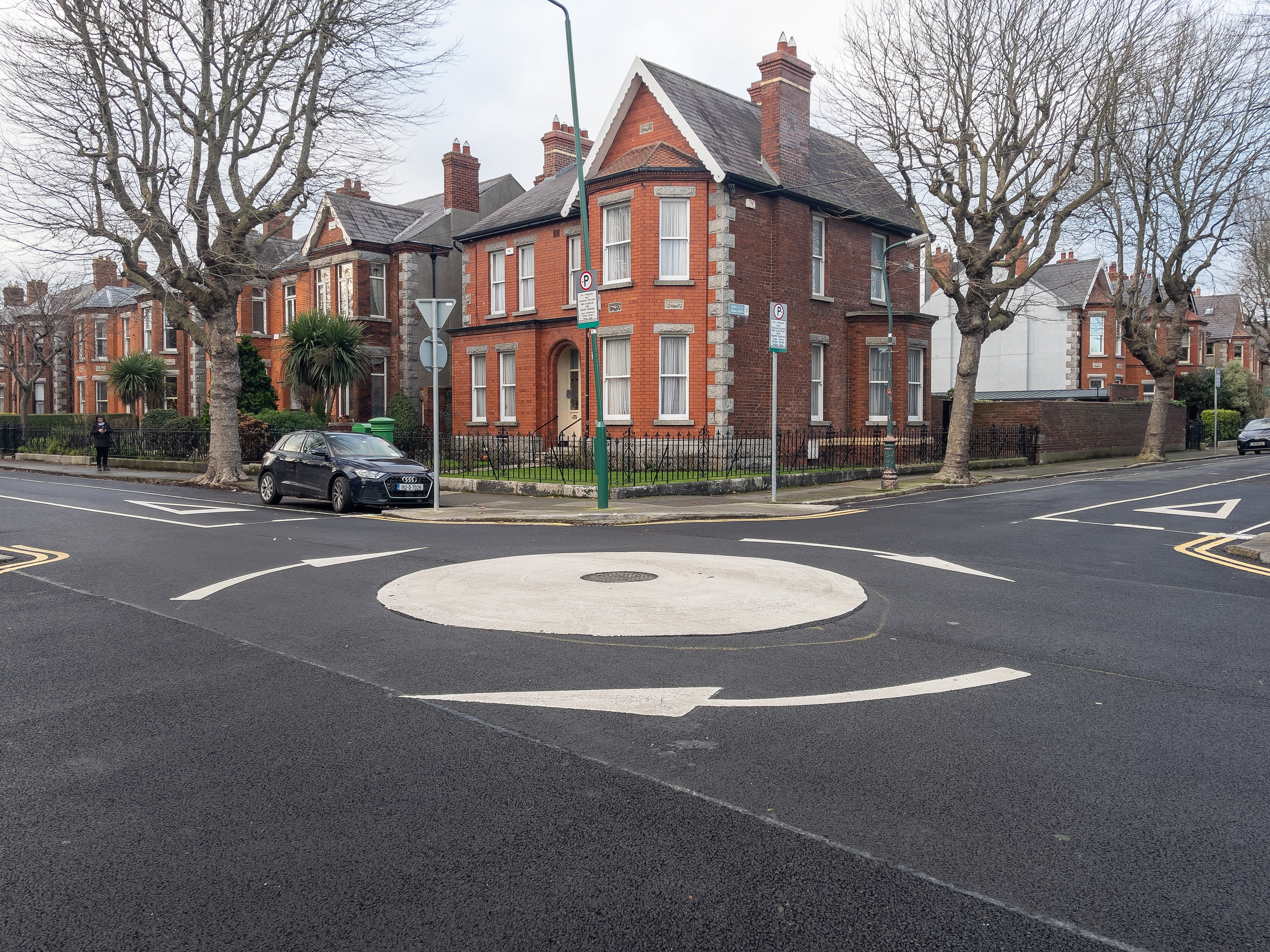
Victorian-era and Edwardian-era housing is common in Glasnevin

The village has changed a lot over the years, and is now fully part of Dublin city.

As well as the amenities of the National Botanic Gardens (Ireland) and local parks, the national meteorological office Met Éireann, the Central Fisheries Board, the National Standards Authority of Ireland, Sustainable Energy Authority of Ireland, the Department of Defence and the national enterprise and trade board Enterprise Ireland are all located in the area.

=== National Botanic Gardens ===
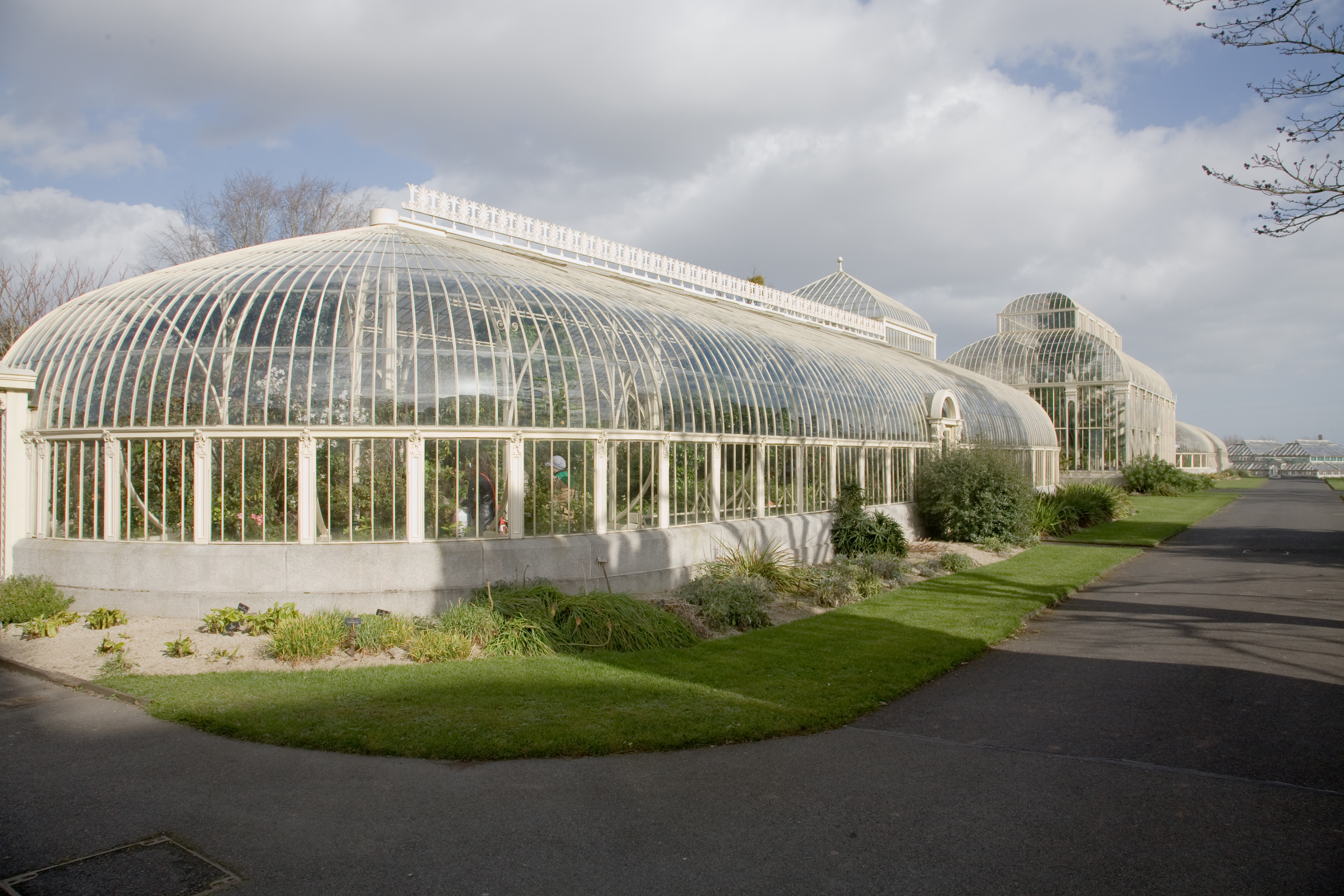
The Curvilinear Range of glasshouses at the Irish National Botanic Gardens

The house and lands of the poet Thomas Tickell were sold in 1790 to the Irish Parliament and given to the Royal Dublin Society for them to establish Ireland's first Botanic Gardens. The gardens were the first location in Ireland where the infection responsible for the 1845–1847 Great Famine was identified. Throughout the famine, research to stop the infection was undertaken at the gardens.

The 48 acres (190,000 m^{2}) which border the River Tolka also adjoin the Prospect Cemetery. In 2002 the Botanic Gardens gained a new two-storey complex which included a new cafe and a large lecture theatre. The Irish National Herbarium is also located at the botanic gardens.

=== Glasnevin (Prospect) Cemetery ===
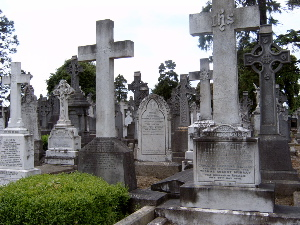
Crosses at Glasnevin Cemetery

Prospect Cemetery is located in Glasnevin, although better known as Glasnevin Cemetery, the most historically notable burial place in the country and the last resting place, among a host of historical figures, of Michael Collins, Éamon de Valera, Charles Stewart Parnell and also Arthur Griffith. This graveyard led to Glasnevin being known as "the dead centre of Dublin". It opened in 1832 and is the final resting place for thousands of ordinary citizens, as well as many Irish patriots.

=== Hart's Corner ===
Approaching Glasnevin via Phibsboro is what is known as Hart's Corner but which about 200 years ago was called Glasmanogue, and was then a well-known stage on the way to Finglas. At an earlier date, the name possessed a wider signification and was applied to a considerable portion of the adjoining district.

=== Delville House ===
At the start of the 18th century a large house, known variously as The Glen and later as Delville House, was built on the site of the present Bon Secours Hospital, Dublin. Its name, Delville, was an amalgamation of the surnames of two tenants, Dr. Helsam and Dr. Patrick Delany (as Heldeville), both fellows of Trinity College.

When Delany married his first wife he acquired sole ownership, but it became more well known as the home of Delany and his second wife, Mary Pendarves. She was a widow whom Delany married in 1743, and was an accomplished letter writer.

The couple were friends of Dean Jonathan Swift and, through him, of Alexander Pope. Pope encouraged the Delaneys to develop a garden in a style then becoming popular in England – moving away from the very formal, geometric layout that was common. He redesigned the house in the style of a villa and had the gardens laid out in the latest Dutch fashion creating what was almost certainly Ireland's first naturalistic garden.

The house was, under Mrs Delany, a centre of Dublin's intellectual life. Swift is said to have composed a number of his campaigning pamphlets while staying there. He and his lifelong companion Stella were both in the habit of visiting, and Swift satirised the grounds which he considered too small for the size of the house. Through her correspondence with her sister, Mrs Dewes, Mary wrote of Swift in 1733: "he calls himself my master and corrects me when I speak bad English or do not pronounce my words distinctly".

Patrick Delany died in 1768 at the age of 82, prompting his widow to sell Delville and return to her native England until her death twenty years later.

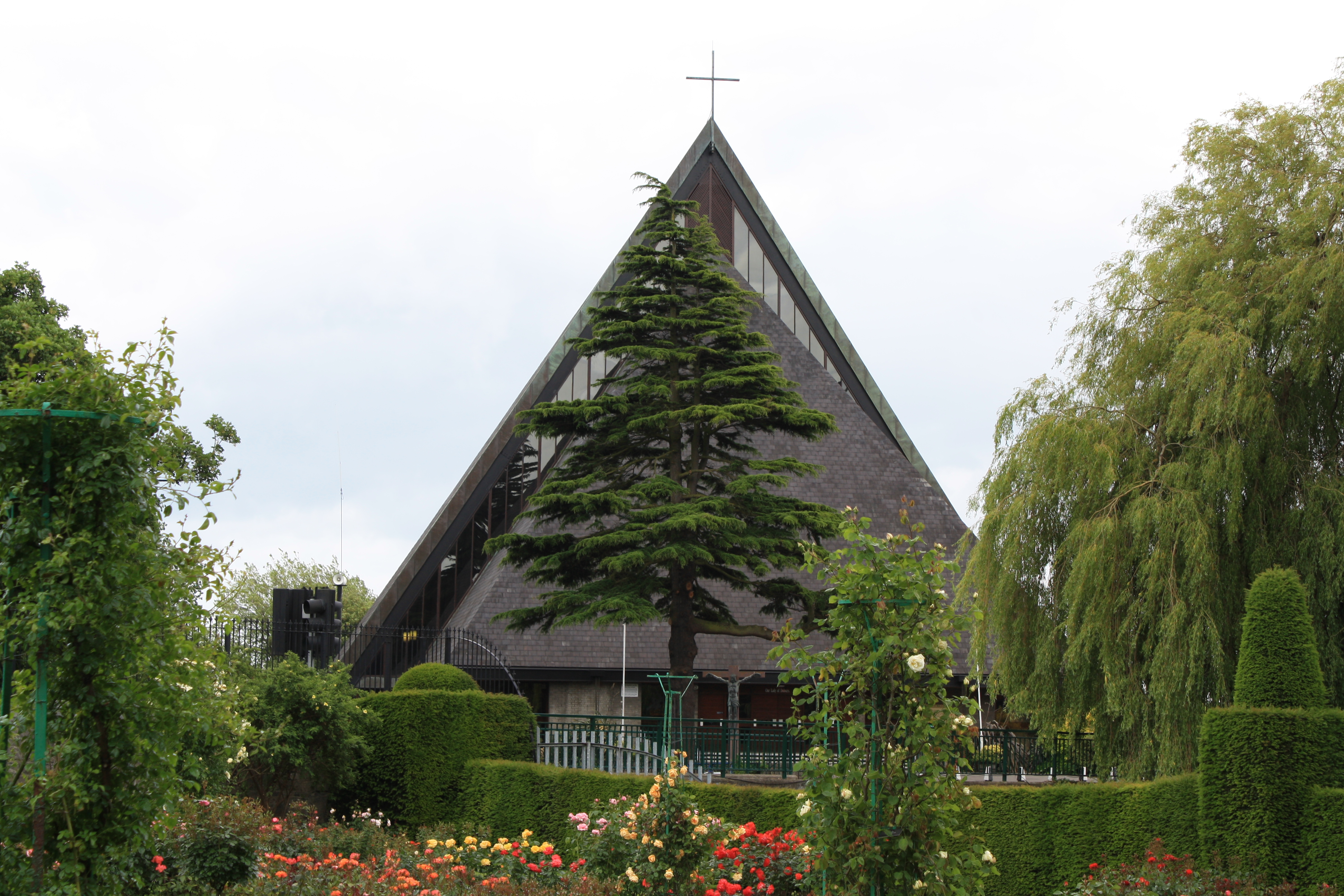
Church of Lady of Dolours (the 'pyramid church')

=== The Pyramid Church ===
Glasnevin is also a parish in the Fingal South West deanery of the Roman Catholic Archdiocese of Dublin. It is served by the Church of Lady of Dolours on the banks of the River Tolka.

A timber church, which originally stood on Berkeley Road, was moved to a riverside site on Botanic Avenue early in the twentieth century; the altar in this church was from Newgate prison in Dublin. It served as the parish church until it was replaced, in 1972, by a structure resembling a pyramid when viewed from Botanic Avenue. The previous church was known locally as "The Woodener" or "The Wooden" and the new building is still known to older residents as "The new Woodener" or "The Wigwam". The church underwent some refurbishment work inside and in its grounds and car park during the first half of 2011.

=== Met Éireann ===
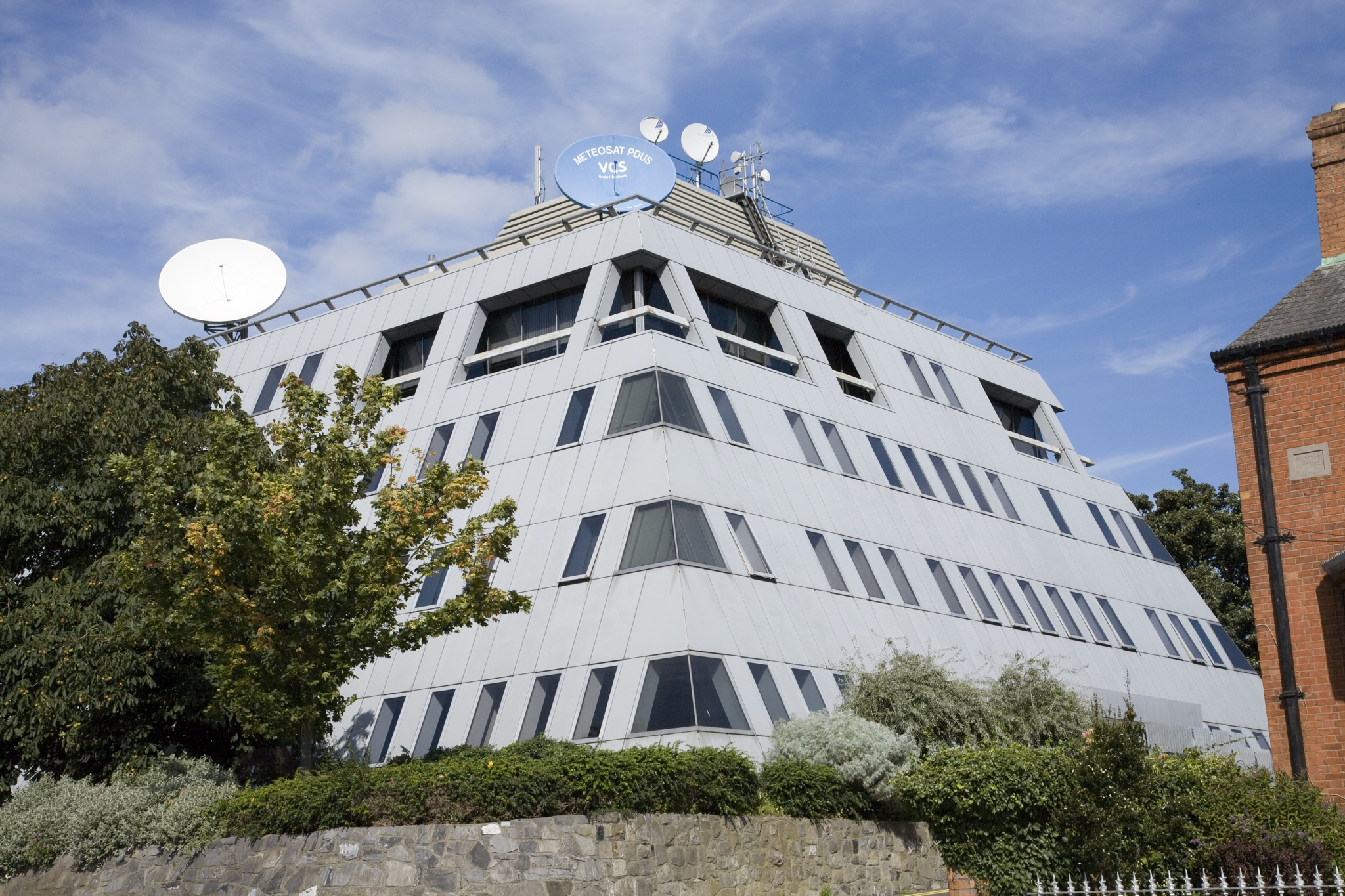
Met Éireann headquarters

In 1979 the new headquarters of Met Éireann, the Irish Meteorological Office, designed by Liam McCormick, opened on Glasnevin Hill, on the site of a former juvenile detention centre, Marlborough House. The Met Éireann building is a pyramidal shape and was originally to be covered in blue slate, however, an indigenous material was deemed more appropriate, and the selected Irish stone failed and had to be replaced by metal sheeting.

=== Griffith Avenue ===
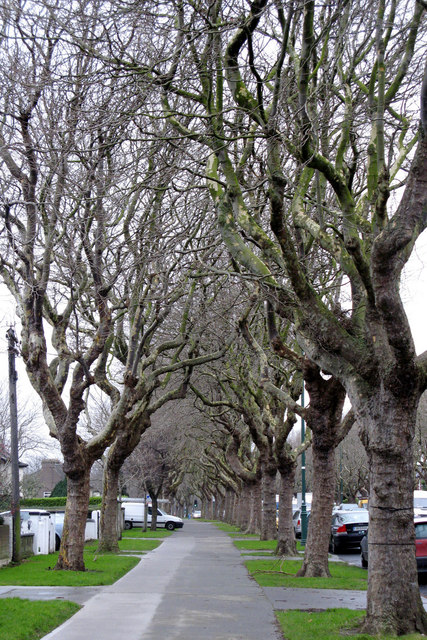
Griffith Avenue

The tree-lined Griffith Avenue runs through Glasnevin, Drumcondra and Marino, and spans three electoral constituencies. Like nearby Griffith Park, it was named after Arthur Griffith, who was the founder and third leader of Sinn Féin, served as President of Dáil Éireann and is buried in Glasnevin Cemetery. The naming has been attributed to politician and property developer Patrick Belton.

A double-row of mature lime trees runs along both sides of Griffith venue from its junction with St Mobhi Road (in the west) to its junction with Malahide Road (in the east), a distance of 2.81 km. It is reputed to be the longest tree-lined purely residential avenue in the Northern Hemisphere.

== Amenities ==
Scouting is represented in Glasnevin by the 1st Dublin (L.H.O) Scout Troop located on the corner of Griffith Avenue and Ballygall Road East.

=== Sport ===
The Gaelic games of Gaelic football, hurling, camogie and Gaelic handball are all organised locally by Na Fianna CLG, while soccer is played by local clubs Tolka Rovers, Glasnevin FC, and Glasnaion FC. Basketball is organised by Tolka Rovers. Tennis is played in Charleville Lawn Tennis Club which was founded in 1894 and took its name from the original location at the corner of the Charleville and Cabra Roads. The move to its present location on Whitworth Road took place in 1904. Hockey is also played in Botanic Hockey club on the Old Finglas Road. Glasnevin Boxing Club and football (soccer) club have a clubhouse on Mobhi road.

Billy Whelan, one of the eight Manchester United players who lost their lives in the Munich air disaster of 6 February 1958, was born locally and is buried in Glasnevin Cemetery.

=== Education ===
There are several primary schools in Glasnevin. These include Lindsay Road National School (Presbyterian patronage) and Glasnevin National School (Church of Ireland patronage), founded by Dean Swift and constructed in a round shape; known as 'The Ink Bottle' this building was replaced in 1911. Also present are Glasnevin Educate Together National school, North Dublin National School Project, Scoil Mobhi, St. Brigid's GNS, St. Columba's NS and St.Vincent's CBS.

There are several Roman Catholic secondary schools in the area St Vincent's (Christian Brothers) School, Scoil Chaitríona and St Mary's (Holy Faith) Secondary School.

The main campus of Dublin City University lies on the border between Glasnevin, Whitehall and Santry, and the DCU Alpha centre is in central Glasnevin. Teagasc also run horticultural education courses from the College of Amenity Horticulture in the Botanic Gardens.

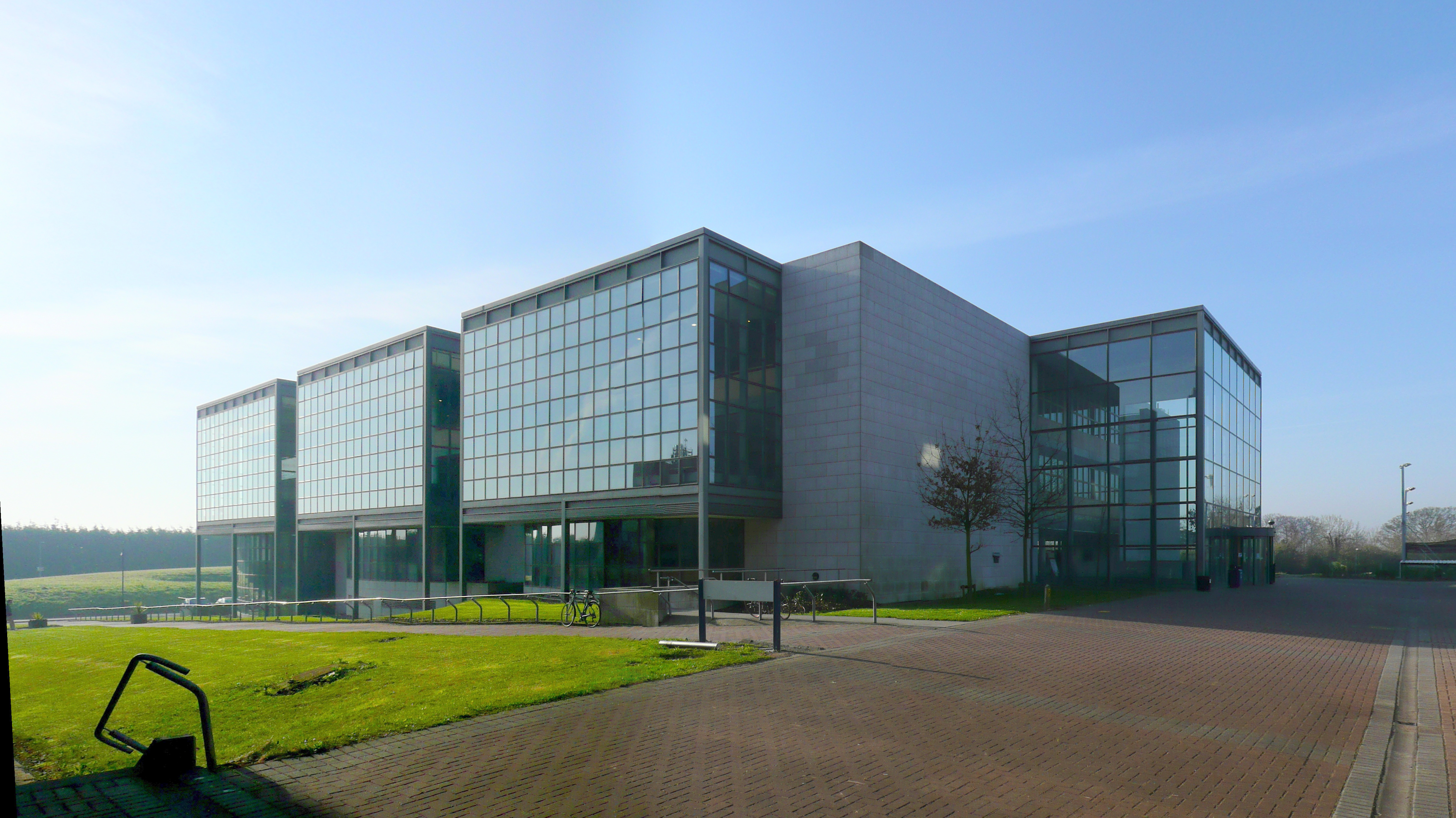
Dublin City University Glasnevin Library

== Representation ==
Glasnevin is part of the Dáil Éireann constituency of Dublin Central.

== Notable people ==
- Margaret Buckley, former president of Sinn Féin (originally from Cork, lived on Marguerite Road, Glasnevin)
- Saint Canice, early Christian abbot (studied under Mobhí of Glasnevin)
- Saint Comgall, early Christian abbot and founder of a monastery at Bangor
- Marian Finucane, architect, journalist and broadcaster
- Colm Gallagher, Fianna Fáil, TD
- Ian Gallahar, cyclist and commissaire
- Alice Glenn, Fine Gael T.D.
- Niamh Kavanagh, singer and winner of the Eurovision Song Contest
- Robbie Kelleher, former All-Ireland winning Gaelic footballer
- Anne Kernan (1933–2020), Irish physicist
- Celia Lynch, Fianna Fáil TD and assistant government whip (originally from Galway, lived on Botanic Road)
- Damien McCaul, television presenter and radio DJ
- Colm Meaney, actor
- Saint Mobhi, early Christian missionary and abbot of Glasnevin monastery
- John O'Connell, Fianna Fáil TD and former Minister for Health, attended school in the area
- Francis Martin O'Donnell, diplomat
- Michael O'Hehir, sports commentator and journalist
- James O'Higgins Norman, academic
- John J. O'Kelly, politician, former President of Sinn Féin and government minister
- Michael O'Riordan, founder of the Communist Party of Ireland
- Róisín Owens, biochemist
- Richard Brinsley Sheridan, satirist, playwright, and politician
- Jonathan Swift, author and essayist who lived across the road from the Glasnevin Model School (now Glasnevin Educate Together)
- Thomas Tickell, poet whose Glasnevin property was later developed as the National Botanic Gardens
