= 2006 UCI Road World Championships – Men's under-23 road race =

Cycling race

Rainbow jersey

The 2006 UCI Road World Championships – Men's Under-23 Road Race took place on September 23, 2006, around the Austrian city of Salzburg. The race was won by German sprinter Gerald Ciolek, who took the sprint from Romain Feillu and Alexander Khatuntsev.

== Results ==
| | Cyclist | Nation | Time |
|---|---|---|---|
| 1 | Gerald Ciolek | Germany | 4h 00' 50" (44.146 km/h) |
| 2 | Romain Feillu | France | + 0" |
| 3 | Alexander Khatuntsev | Russia | + 0" |
| 4 | Francesco Gavazzi | Italy | + 0" |
| 5 | Jelle Vanendert | Belgium | + 0" |
| 6 | Robert Gesink | Netherlands | + 0" |
| 7 | Jos van Emden | Netherlands | + 4" |
| 8 | Sergey Kolesnikov | Russia | + 5" |
| 9 | Edvald Boasson Hagen | Norway | + 5" |
| 10 | Danilo Wyss | Switzerland | + 5" |
| 11 | Mark Cavendish | Great Britain | + 5" |
| 12 | Andris Buividas | Lithuania | + 5" |
| 13 | Anatoliy Pakhtusov | Ukraine | + 5" |
| 14 | Yukiya Arashiro | Japan | + 5" |
| 15 | Diego Milán Jiménez | Spain | + 5" |
| 16 | Michał Gołaś | Poland | + 5" |
| 17 | Grega Bole | Slovenia | + 5" |
| 18 | John Devine | United States | + 5" |
| 19 | Jure Kocjan | Slovenia | + 5" |
| 20 | Dmytro Grabovskyy | Ukraine | + 5" |
| 21 | Gil Suray | Belgium | + 5" |
| 22 | Peter Velits | Slovakia | + 5" |
| 23 | Rene Mandri | Estonia | + 5" |
| 24 | Filipe Duarte Sousa Cardoso | Portugal | + 5" |
| 25 | Roman Kireyev | Kazakhstan | + 5" |
| 26 | Anders Lund | Denmark | + 5" |
| 27 | Stefan Denifl | Austria | + 5" |
| 28 | Christoph Sokoll | Austria | + 5" |
| 29 | James Meadley | Australia | + 5" |
| 30 | Nikolas Maes | Belgium | + 5" |
| 31 | Rigoberto Urán Urán | Colombia | + 5" |
| 32 | Miguel Ángel Rubiano Chávez | Colombia | + 5" |
| 33 | Denis Cioban | Moldova | + 5" |
| 34 | Sebastian Langeveld | Netherlands | + 5" |
| 35 | Jan Bárta | Czech Republic | + 5" |
| 36 | Andrey Zeits | Kazakhstan | + 5" |
| 37 | John-Lee Augustyn | South Africa | + 5" |
| 38 | Josef Kugler | Austria | + 5" |
| 39 | Leopold König | Czech Republic | + 5" |
| 40 | Anton Reshetnikov | Russia | + 5" |
| 41 | Thomas Peterson | United States | + 5" |
| 42 | António Manuel Campos Jesus | Portugal | + 5" |
| 43 | Andre Fernando S. Martins Cardoso | Portugal | + 5" |
| 44 | Alexandr Pliuschkin | Moldova | + 5" |
| 45 | Chris Froome | Kenya | + 5" |
| 46 | Tiago José Pinto Machado | Portugal | + 5" |
| 47 | Cameron Evans | Canada | + 5" |
| 48 | Christian Meier | Canada | + 5" |
| 49 | Mark Cassidy | Ireland | + 5" |
| 50 | Thomas Frei | Switzerland | + 5" |
| 51 | Andriy Buchko | Ukraine | + 5" |
| 52 | Martin Velits | Slovakia | + 5" |
| 53 | Piotr Zieliński | Poland | + 5" |
| 54 | Simon Špilak | Slovenia | + 5" |
| 55 | Edwin Arnulfo Parra Bustamante | Colombia | + 5" |
| 56 | Ignatas Konovalovas | Lithuania | + 5" |
| 57 | Greg Van Avermaet | Belgium | + 5" |
| 58 | Stefan Trafelet | Switzerland | + 5" |
| 59 | Dominique Cornu | Belgium | + 5" |
| 60 | Ermanno Capelli | Italy | + 5" |
| 61 | Steve Bovay | Switzerland | + 5" |
| 62 | Beñat Intxausti Elorriaga | Spain | + 5" |
| 63 | Andrei Kunitski | Belarus | + 12" |
| 64 | Francesco Ginanni | Italy | + 12" |
| 65 | Dan Martin | Ireland | + 12" |
| 66 | Jérôme Coppel | France | + 12" |
| 67 | Tom Stamsnijder | Netherlands | + 12" |
| 68 | Istvan Cziraki | Hungary | + 25" |
| 69 | Dalivier Ospina Navarro | Colombia | + 35" |
| 70 | Timothy Gudsell | New Zealand | + 35" |
| 71 | David Veilleux | Canada | + 35" |
| 72 | Paídi O'Brien | Ireland | + 35" |
| 73 | Hanco Kachelhoffer | South Africa | + 35" |
| 74 | Gatis Smukulis | Latvia | + 35" |
| 75 | Lars Petter Nordhaug | Norway | + 35" |
| 76 | Kristijan Đurasek | Croatia | + 35" |
| 77 | Florian Morizot | France | + 35" |
| 78 | Cyril Gautier | France | + 35" |
| 79 | Oleg Opryshko | Ukraine | + 35" |
| 80 | Bartłomiej Matysiak | Poland | + 35" |
| 81 | Paweł Cieślik | Poland | + 35" |
| 82 | Lars Boom | Netherlands | + 35" |
| 83 | Pierre Rolland | France | + 35" |
| 84 | Maciej Bodnar | Poland | + 35" |
| 85 | Benoît Sinner | France | + 35" |
| 86 | Craig Lewis | United States | + 35" |
| 87 | Davide Malacarne | Italy | + 35" |
| 88 | Michael Stevenson | Sweden | + 1.01" |
| 89 | Lucas Persson | Sweden | + 1.48" |
| 90 | Rein Taaramäe | Estonia | + 1.48" |
| 91 | Toms Veinbergs | Latvia | + 2.18" |
| 92 | Peter Latham | New Zealand | + 2.26" |
| 93 | Herberts Pudans | Latvia | + 3.52" |
| 94 | Dmytro Kryvtsov | Ukraine | + 3.52" |
| 95 | Patrik Tybor | Slovakia | + 3.52" |
| 96 | Alexander Kristoff | Norway | + 3.52" |
| 97 | Alexander Gottfried | Germany | + 3.52" |
| 98 | Laurent Didier | Luxembourg | + 3.52" |
| 99 | Enrique Mata Cabello | Spain | + 3.52" |
| 100 | Luis Pulido Naranjo | Mexico | + 3.52" |
| 101 | Dominik Roels | Germany | + 3.52" |
| 102 | Tony Martin | Germany | + 3.52" |
| 103 | Stefan Kushlev | Bulgaria | + 3.52" |
| 104 | Mikhail Ignatiev | Russia | + 3.52" |
| 105 | Vitaliy Kondrut | Ukraine | + 3.52" |
| 106 | Stian Sommerseth | Norway | + 3.52" |
| 107 | Nazareno Rossi | Switzerland | + 3.52" |
| 108 | Norbert Dürauer | Austria | + 4.18" |
| 109 | Jonas Aaen Jørgensen | Denmark | + 4.21" |
| 110 | Bolat Raimbekov | Kazakhstan | + 4.21" |
| 111 | Oleg Berdos | Moldova | + 4.21" |
| 112 | Vladimir Kerkez | Slovenia | + 4.21" |
| 113 | Alvaro Argiro | Argentina | + 6.55" |
| 114 | Abdelkader Belmokhtar | Algeria | + 6.55" |
| 115 | Branislau Samoilau | Belarus | + 6.55" |
| 116 | Dario Cataldo | Italy | + 6.55" |
| 117 | Jackson Jesús Rodríguez Ortiz | Venezuela | + 6.55" |
| 118 | Elio Frausto Saavedra | Mexico | + 6.55" |
| 119 | Matthew Goss | Australia | + 6.55" |
| 120 | Mathias Belka | Germany | + 6.55" |
| 121 | Jonathon Clarke | Australia | + 6.55" |
| 122 | Jan Simek | Czech Republic | + 6.55" |
| 123 | Emanuel Kišerlovski | Croatia | + 6.55" |
| 124 | Ryan Connor | Ireland | + 6.55" |
| 125 | Ian Stannard | Great Britain | + 8.02" |
| 126 | Kristoffer Gudmund Nielsen | Denmark | + 8.02" |
| 127 | Ben Greenwood | Great Britain | + 8.02" |
| 128 | Brandon Crichton | Canada | + 9.06" |
| 129 | Ivan Viglassky | Slovakia | + 13.09" |
| 130 | Mitsunari Mitaki | Japan | + 13.09" |
| 131 | Berik Kupeshov | Kazakhstan | + 13.09" |
| 132 | Robert Kiserlovski | Croatia | + 17.03" |
| 133 | Darwin Luis Urrea Vergara | Venezuela | +1 lap |
| 134 | Johan Lindgren | Sweden | +1 lap |
| 135 | Arturs Ansons | Latvia | +1 lap |
| 136 | Andrei Mustonen | Estonia | +1 lap |
| 137 | Miguel Ochoa Gonzales | Spain | +1 lap |
| 138 | Péter Kusztor | Hungary | +1 lap |
| 139 | Gabriel Lenin Juárez Herrera | Mexico | +1 lap |
| 140 | Zoltan Mecseri | Hungary | +1 lap |
| 141 | Esad Hasanović | Serbia and Montenegro | +1 lap |
| 142 | František Klouček | Czech Republic | +1 lap |
| 143 | Hyun Wook Joo | Korea | +1 lap |
| 144 | Nicolae Stoica Marius | Romania | +1 lap |
| DNF | Shaun Higgerson | Australia | |
| DNF | Ruslan Sambris | Moldova | |
| DNF | Miha Svab | Slovenia | |
| DNF | Fabio Andres Duarte Arevalo | Colombia | |
| DNF | Geraint Thomas | Great Britain | |
| DNF | Tiago Fiorilli | Brazil | |
| DNF | Simon Clarke | Australia | |
| DNF | Lukas Fus | Czech Republic | |
| DNF | Maxim Belkov | Russia | |
| DNF | Daryl Impey | South Africa | |
| DNF | Ben Gastauer | Luxembourg | |
| DNF | Andrew Tennant | Great Britain | |
| DNF | Gonzalo Rabuñal Rios | Spain | |
| DNF | Federico Pagani | Argentina | |
| DNF | Jorge Soto | Uruguay | |
| DNF | Georg Hausbacher | Austria | |
| DNF | Norihide Murayama | Japan | |
| DNF | Gert Jõeäär | Estonia | |
| DNF | Logan Dennis Hutchings | New Zealand | |
| DNF | André Steensen | Denmark | |
| DNF | Arthur Alberto Garcia Rincon | Venezuela | |
| DNF | Yusuke Hatanaka | Japan | |
| DNF | José João Pimenta Costa Mendes | Portugal | |
| DNF | Mohamed Larbi Aoun Seghir | Algeria | |
| DNF | Cyrille Heymans | Luxembourg | |
| DNF | Ramon Orlando Lopez Roger | Mexico | |
| DNF | Romas Sinicinas | Lithuania | |
| DNF | Tanel Kangert | Estonia | |
| DNF | Javier Alejandro Salas | Argentina | |
| DNF | Stefan Koychev Hristov | Bulgaria | |
| DNF | Milos Velickovic | Serbia and Montenegro | |
| DNF | Chris Anker Sørensen | Denmark | |
| DNF | Sergey Renev | Kazakhstan | |
| DNS | Hannachi Abdelbasset | Algeria | |
