= 2010 Rás Tailteann =

Race details
- Dates: 23-30 May
- Stages: 8
- Distance: 1,240 km (770.5 mi)
- Winning time: 24h 44' 13"

Results
	Winner	Alexander Wetterhall (SWE)	(Team Sprocket Pro)
	Second	Peter Williams (GBR)	(Motorpoint–Marshalls Pasta)
	Third	Dan Craven (NAM)	(Rapha Condor Sharp)
	Points	John Degenkolb (GER)	(Thuringer Energie)
	Mountains	Mark Cassidy (IRL)	(An Post–Sean Kelly)
	Youth	Connor McConvey (IRL)	(An Post–Sean Kelly)

The 2010 FBD Insurance Rás Tailteann was the 58th edition of the Rás Tailteann cycle race. The race took place over 8 days between 23 and 30 May 2010. The race was sponsored by FBD Insurance.

== Stages ==
=== Stage 1 ===
Stage 1 took place on 23 May 2010, the race began in Dunboyne, County Meath and it finished in Dundalk, County Louth. The stage was a total distance of 149 km. Dan Craven of Rapha Condor-Sharp won the race in 3 hours and 28 minutes.

=== Stage 2 ===
The second stage took place on 24 May 2010, the race started in Dundalk, County Louth. The stage was declared void after a jeep collided with several riders leading the race.

=== Stage 3 ===
Stage 3 took place on 25 May 2010 from Carrick-on-Shannon to Oughterard, County Galway. The stage was won by Irish pro David O'Loughlin of An Post–Sean Kelly in a time of 3 hours and 50 minutes. The race distance was 171 km.

=== Stage 4 ===
Stage 4 took place on 26 May from Oughterard to Tipperary town, Germany's Maximillian May of Thuringer Energie won in a time of 3 hours and 49 minutes, he just edged 19 other riders in a sprint finish.

=== Stage 5 ===
The fifth stage took place on 27 May from Tipperary town to Carrick-on-Suir. British rider Jonathan Tiernan-Locke of Rapha Condor-Sharp finished the stage in first place.

=== Stage 6 ===
Stage 6 took place on 28 May, it began in Carrick-on-Suir and finished in Gorey, County Wexford. John Degenkolb of Thuringer Energie won the 127 km stage in just under three hours alongside Dan Craven of Rapha Condor-Sharp who came second in under a second behind John Degenkolb.

=== Stage 7 ===
Mark Cassidy of An Post–Sean Kelly won the 151 km 7th Stage from Gorey to Kilcullen.

=== Stage 8 ===
The final stage was from Kilcullen to Skerries, County Dublin and was won by German John Degenkolb of the Thuringer Energie team. Alexander Wetterhall of Team Sprocket Pro became the first Swedish winner of the Ras with a time of 24 hours 44 mins 13 secs. He was 59 seconds ahead of Englands Peter Williams, with Dan Craven of Namibia back in 3rd place. Irelands Connor McConvey took 4th place, as well as the Best U23 rider class. McConveys An Post–Sean Kelly teammate Mark Cassidy won the KoM class. Final Stage winner Degenkolb also took the Points classification. Ryan Sherlock was the best County finisher.

== Winners ==
=== General classification ===
	Cyclist	Team	Time
1	Alexander Wetterhall (SWE)	Team Sprocket Pro	+ 24h 44' 13"
2	Peter Williams (GBR)	Motorpoint–Marshalls Pasta	+ 0' 59"
3	Dan Craven (NAM)	Rapha Condor Sharp	+ 1' 32"
4	Connor McConvey (IRL)	An Post–Sean Kelly	+ 1' 45"
5	Jonathan Tiernan-Locke (GBR)	Rapha Condor Sharp	+ 1' 45"
6	Rob Partridge (GBR)	Team Wales	+ 1' 49"
7	Pieter Ghyllebert (BEL)	An Post–Sean Kelly	+ 2' 04"
8	Joseph Lewis (AUS)	Drapac Porsche	+ 2' 07"
9	John Degenkolb (GER)	Thuringer Energie	+ 2' 19"
10	Maximillian May (GER)	Thuringer Energie	+ 3' 41"

== Jersey progress ==
Stage (Winner)	General Classification	Points Classification	Mountains Classification	Young Rider Classification
Stage 1 (Dan Craven)	Dan Craven	Dan Craven	Dan Craven	Mark McNally
Stage 2 (No Winner)	Dan Craven	Dan Craven	Dan Craven	Mark McNally
Stage 3 (David O'Loughlin)	Dan Craven	Dan Craven	David O'Loughlin	Mark McNally
Stage 4 (Maximilian May)	Alexander Wetterhall	Dan Craven	David O'Loughlin	Joseph Lewis
Stage 5 (Jonathan Tiernan-Locke)	Alexander Wetterhall	Peter Williams	David O'Loughlin	Connor McConvey
Stage 6 (John Degenkolb)	Alexander Wetterhall	John Degenkolb	David O'Loughlin	Connor McConvey
Stage 7 (Mark Cassidy)	Alexander Wetterhall	John Degenkolb	Mark Cassidy	Connor McConvey
Stage 8 (John Degenkolb)	Alexander Wetterhall	John Degenkolb	Mark Cassidy	Connor McConvey
Final	Alexander Wetterhall	John Degenkolb	Mark Cassidy	Connor McConvey
