= Vitus (bicycle company) =

British bicycle manufacturer

- Industry: Bicycle manufacturing
- Founded: 1931; 95 years ago in Saint-Étienne, France
- Headquarters: Belfast, Northern Ireland, United Kingdom, Part of Wiggle Ltd
- Products: Bicycle and Related Components
- Parent: Frasers Group
- Website: vitusbikes.com

Vitus is a Northern Irish direct-to-consumer bicycle brand owned by Frasers Group and is known for its range of medium to high-end road and mountain bikes. The brand has gained popularity for its innovative design and use of lightweight materials. Vitus bicycles have been ridden by numerous professional athletes and have achieved success in various cycling disciplines.

== History ==
The Vitus name was originally founded in the 1930s by steel tubing manufacturer, Ateliers de la Rive based in Saint-Étienne, France. It was well-known for steel tubing sets like Rubis and Durifort (straight gauge), as well as Vitus 172 and Super Vitus 971 (double butted tubing).

Vitus made a significant breakthrough in bicycle technology by introducing the world's first mass-produced aluminium frames in the mid-1970s. These frames, known as Vitus 979, revolutionized the cycling industry with their lightweight and responsive characteristics. In 1978 French bike manufacturer Bador, also of Saint-Étienne, acquired a majority share of the company.

Vitus faced challenges during the late 90s and early 2000s as the cycling industry rapidly evolved. The brand underwent multiple ownership changes, including being owned by prominent French cycling companies Look and Time. Despite attempts to revive the brand and regain its previous success, its parent company Alvarez went into administration in 2008. Consequently, the brand ceased operations.

In 2011, the brand was revived when it was acquired by Chain Reaction Cycles, a Northern Irish online bicycle retailer. This acquisition marked a new chapter for Vitus, as it embraced the digital age and expanded its reach to a global customer base. With the backing of Chain Reaction Cycles and using a direct-to-consumer business model, Vitus continued to innovate and produce competitively priced bicycles. Wiggle Ltd, another online retailer of cycling and triathlon equipment, acquired Chain Reaction Cycles (CRC) in July 2016, thus acquiring the Vitus brand. In March 2024 Wiggle Ltd went broke and the brands were acquired by Frasers Group.

The Vitus operations, design and development team remain in Northern Ireland while manufacturing and assembly occur in Asia.

== Models ==
Model Ranges by Discipline Category
Category	Discipline	Model Range
Mountain	Downhill	Dominer
	Enduro	Sommet, E-Sommet
	Trail/AM	Escarpe, Mythique
	Trail Hardtail	Nucleus, Sentier
	Cross Country	Rapide, Rapide FS
Road	Race	ZX-1 EVO, Vitesse EVO
	All-Road	Venon EVO-RS, Venon EVO-GR, Venon EVO-RS AERO
	Performance	Zenium, Razor
	Gravel	Substance
	Cyclocross	Energie EVO, Energie
	Time Trial	Auro
E-Bikes	MTB	E-Sommet
	City	Mach-E
	Road & Gravel	E-Substance
	Sport	Mach 3, Mach-E
	Utility	Mach-1

== Frames ==
Compared to modern aluminium bicycle frames, early Vitus aluminium frames, such as the 979, offered more comfort because of the small diameter of the tubes. As a result, the frames lacked some degree of lateral stiffness compared to their steel counterparts.

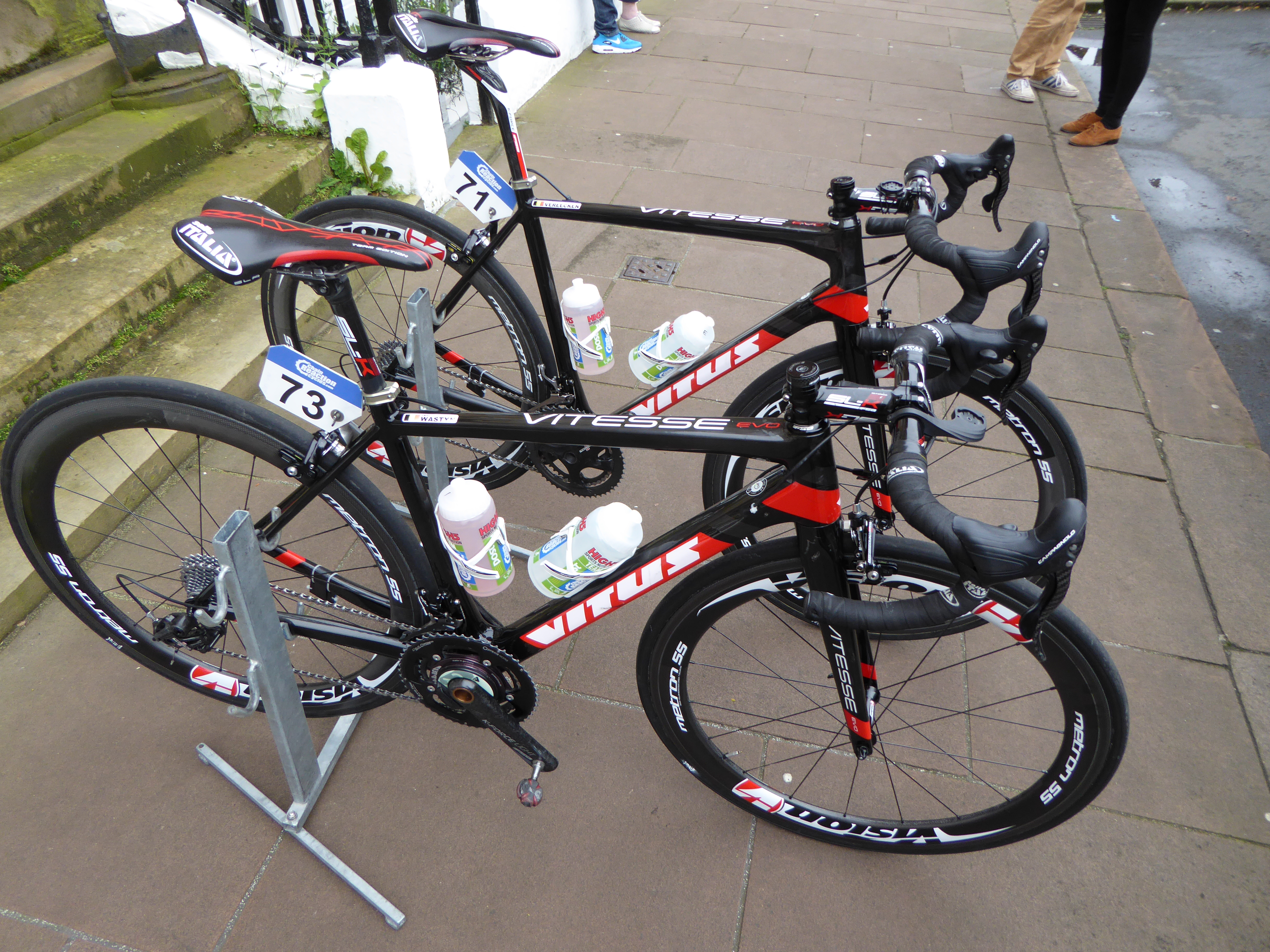
Vitus bicycles, used by the An Post–Chain Reaction cycling team, at the 2016 Tour of Britain.

The Vitus 992 improved on the 979 design by pinching the aluminium tubes into an ovoid shape at certain critical places, greatly improving stiffness.

In the early 1980s, Vitus began producing frames using carbon fiber tubing, but did so in keeping with the company's method of using small diameter tubing and bonding lugs.

The company later expanded its product offering with carbon fiber semi-monocoque frames (made with more than one monocoque element), like the ZX-1. The ZX-1 was one of the first monocoque carbon fiber bikes made.
