= Niko Eeckhout =

Belgian cyclist (born 1970)

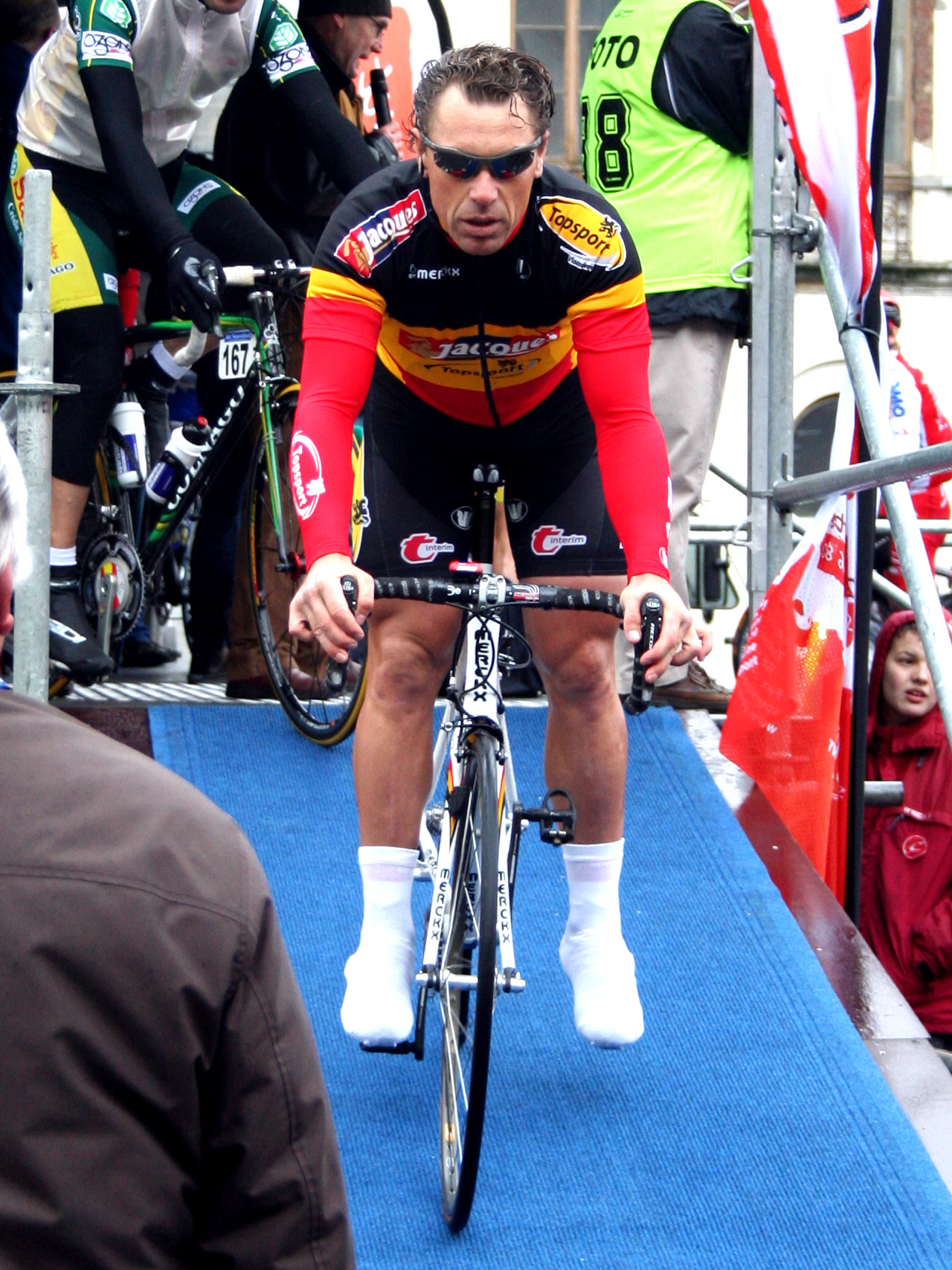

Personal information
- Full name: Niko Eeckhout
- Nickname: Rambo
- Born: 16 December 1970 (age 55) Izegem, Belgium
- Height: 1.73 m (5 ft 8 in)
- Weight: 73 kg (161 lb)

Cycling career
- Sport: Cycling
- Discipline: Road
- Rider type: Classics specialist, sprinter

Professional teams
- 1992–1996: Collstrop–Garden Wood
- 1997–1998: Lotto–Mobistar–Isoglass
- 1999–2000: Palmans–Ideal
- 2001–2004: Lotto–Adecco
- 2005–2008: Chocolade Jacques–T Interim
- 2009–2013: An Post–M.Donnelly–Grant Thornton–Sean Kelly

Managerial team
- 2014–2017: An Post–Chain Reaction

Major wins
- UCI Europe Tour Champion (2005–2006); Belgian National Road Race Championships (2006); Dwars door Vlaanderen (2001, 2005); Championship of Flanders (1996, 1998, 2000, 2006)

Niko Eeckhout (born 16 December 1970) is a Belgian former road racing cyclist who rode professionally between 1992 and 2013. He was the 2005–2006 UCI Europe Tour Series Champion and won the 2006 Belgian National Cycling Championship Road Race. After retiring from racing he became a coach, initially with his final professional team An Post–Chain Reaction.

== Career ==
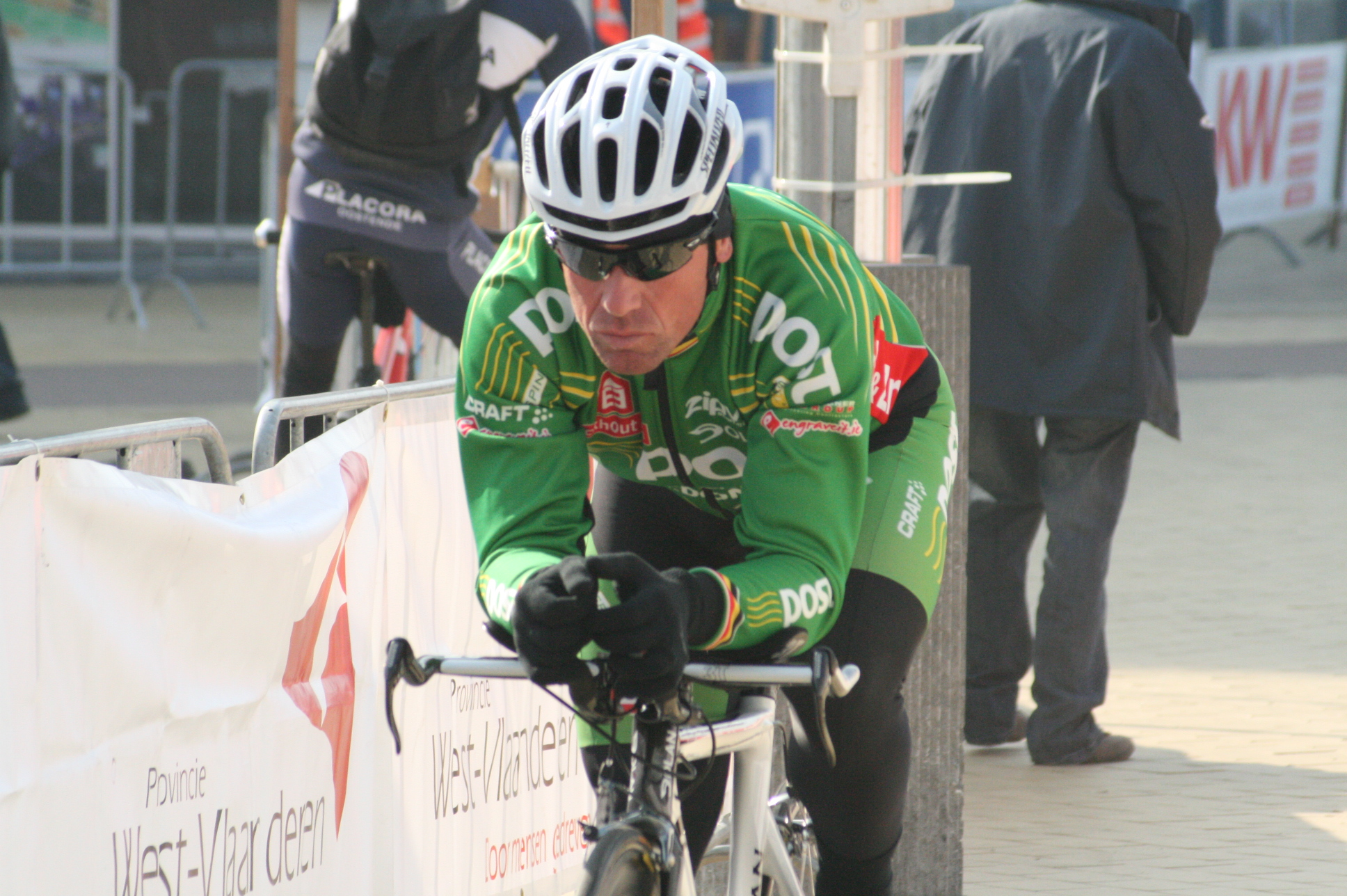
Niko Eeckhout at the 2011 Driedaagse van West-Vlaanderen

Born in Izegem, Eeckhout started his career in 1993 riding for the small Collstrop-team. He immediately started winning minor Belgian races like the Championship of Flanders and the Omloop Mandel-Leie-Schelde. In 1997 and 1998 he rode for Lotto–Mobistar–Isoglass, and then rode two years for Palmans. Eeckhout had a breakthrough season when he transferred to Lotto-Adecco in 2001, winning 11 races, including Dwars door Vlaanderen and the GP van Steenbergen.

Eeckhout struggled through the next two seasons and at the end of 2004 his contract with Lotto-Adecco ended and he needed to find a new team. He signed with the Belgian squad Chocolade Jacques and found his second youth. He started the 2005 season by winning Dwars door Vlaanderen, and went on to win major races including the Grand Prix d'Isbergues and a stage of the Three Days of De Panne. In 2006 he continued his winning form, taking the Three Days of West-Flanders. In June 2006 he won the biggest race in his career, the Belgian National Road Championship in Antwerp by beating Tom Boonen and Philippe Gilbert. Eeckhout had another great season in 2006, winning 12 races, including the 2005-2006 UCI Europe Tour. In the peloton he earned the nickname "Rambo" for being particularly tough during hard races in severe conditions.

Eeckhout joined An Post–M.Donnelly–Grant Thornton–Sean Kelly in 2009 and won five races in his first season with the team. The thirty-eight year old said this would be his last professional team and that he had already discussed moving into management with team boss Sean Kelly and general manager Kurt Bogaerts. He also brought new sponsors, with the construction and truck repair companies owned by his brothers giving financial and logistical support to the team.

Eeckhout followed up the team's 2008 general classification success at the Vuelta a Extremadura with two stage victories at the Spanish race, and took a stage and the points jersey at Rás Tailteann. He also scored one-day race wins at Grote Prijs Stad Zottegem and Memorial Rik Van Steenbergen, as well as a second-place finish at Dwars door Vlaanderen.

He spent five seasons racing with the Irish team and took a further five wins including Schaal Sels and Omloop der Kempen in 2012, both achieved at the age of forty-one. In 2013 he had two podium results and retired at the end of the season aged forty-three. As planned when he joined the team in 2009, he remained with the squad as a directeur sportif.

== Major achievements ==
1992
1st Kattekoers
1st Stage 3 Tour de Liège
3rd Nationale Sluitingprijs
1993
1st Omloop der Vlaamse Ardennen Ichtegem
1st Omloop van de Vlaamse Scheldeboorden
1st Stages 2 & 3 Tour du Poitou-Charentes
2nd GP Rik Van Steenbergen
1994
4th Kuurne–Brussels–Kuurne
1995
2nd GP Stad Zottegem
1996
1st Kampioenschap van Vlaanderen
1st Omloop van het Waasland
1st Grand Prix de la Ville de Lillers
3rd A Travers le Morbihan
4th Paris–Bourges
4th Le Samyn
5th Veenendaal–Veenendaal
6th GP Rik Van Steenbergen
8th Grote Prijs Jef Scherens
1997
1st Omloop van het Waasland
1st Grand Prix de la Ville de Lillers
4th Nokere Koerse
6th Kuurne–Brussels–Kuurne
9th Cholet-Pays de Loire
1998
1st Kampioenschap van Vlaanderen
1999
1st Omloop van de Westhoek
2nd De Kustpijl
2nd Omloop van het Waasland
2nd Leeuwse Pijl
3rd Grand Prix de Denain
4th Kampioenschap van Vlaanderen
2000
1st Kampioenschap van Vlaanderen
1st Grand Prix Rudy Dhaenens
1st Omloop van het Houtland
1st Omloop van de Westhoek
2nd Ronde van Midden-Zeeland
2nd Veenendaal–Veenendaal
3rd Sparkassen Giro Bochum
3rd GP Aarhus
3rd Grand Prix Midtbank
4th Grand Prix Pino Cerami
4th Nokere Koerse
5th Paris–Brussels
2001
1st Overall Étoile de Bessèges

1st Points classification
1st Stage 1

1st Dwars door Vlaanderen
1st Ronde van Midden-Zeeland
1st Memorial Rik Van Steenbergen
1st Grote Prijs Jef Scherens
1st Stage 3 Circuit Franco-Belge
2nd Paris–Brussels
3rd Schaal Sels
3rd Cholet-Pays de Loire
3rd Nokere Koerse
9th Overall Danmark Rundt

1st Stage 2

9th Overall Three Days of De Panne

1st Points classification

9th Paris–Tours
2002
4th Overall Three Days of De Panne
6th Dwars door Vlaanderen
8th Nokere Koerse
9th GP Rik Van Steenbergen
9th Schaal Sels
2003
1st Memorial Rik Van Steenbergen
1st Stage 1 Tour de Wallonie
2nd Omloop van de Vlaamse Scheldeboorden
3rd Grote Prijs Jef Scherens
2004
1st Ronde van Midden-Zeeland
1st Stage 4 Ster Elektrotoer
2nd Memorial Rik Van Steenbergen
6th Dwars door Vlaanderen
7th Overall Circuit Franco-Belge
10th Paris–Brussels
2005
1st Dwars door Vlaanderen
1st Grand Prix d'Isbergues
1st Grote Prijs Beeckman-De Caluwé
1st Omloop van de Vlaamse Scheldeboorden
1st Stage 2 Three Days of De Panne
4th Paris–Brussels
4th Omloop Het Volk
4th Kuurne–Brussels–Kuurne
5th Overall Tour of Belgium
5th Scheldeprijs
6th Nationale Sluitingprijs
8th Veenendaal–Veenendaal
8th Omloop van het Waasland
2006
1st Overall UCI Europe Tour
1st Road race, National Road Championships
1st Overall Driedaagse van West-Vlaanderen

1st Stage 3

1st Kampioenschap van Vlaanderen
1st Omloop van het Waasland
1st Memorial Rik Van Steenbergen
Circuit Franco-Belge

1st Points classification
1st Stage 3

2nd Omloop van het Houtland
2nd Cholet-Pays de Loire
4th Ronde van Midden-Zeeland
4th Kuurne–Brussels–Kuurne
4th Scheldeprijs
4th Dwars door Vlaanderen
6th Omloop van de Vlaamse Scheldeboorden
7th Overall Tour of Belgium
8th Halle–Ingooigem
2007
1st Omloop van het Waasland
2nd Memorial Rik Van Steenbergen
3rd Omloop van het Houtland
4th Overall Driedaagse van West-Vlaanderen
6th Kampioenschap van Vlaanderen
2008
1st Omloop van het Waasland
2nd Overall Driedaagse van West-Vlaanderen
3rd Road race, National Road Championships
3rd Dutch Food Valley Classic
3rd Dwars door Vlaanderen
4th Ronde van het Groene Hart
5th Omloop van de Vlaamse Scheldeboorden
5th Kampioenschap van Vlaanderen
6th Overall Tour de Picardie
7th Nokere Koerse
10th Omloop van het Houtland
2009
1st Grote Prijs Stad Zottegem
1st Memorial Briek Schotte-Desselgem
1st Memorial Rik Van Steenbergen
FBD Insurance Ras

1st Points classification
1st Stage 1

1st Stages 4 & 5 Vuelta a Extremadura
2nd Dwars door Vlaanderen
3rd Omloop van het Houtland
6th Omloop van het Waasland
7th Sparkassen Giro
10th Nokere Koerse
2010
1st Stage 5 Étoile de Bessèges
1st Stage 3 Ronde de l'Oise
2nd Ronde van het Groene Hart
7th Omloop Het Nieuwsblad
2011
3rd Handzame Classic
4th Omloop van het Waasland
8th Overall Driedaagse van West-Vlaanderen

1st Stage 2

2012
1st Wanzeel Koerse
1st Omloop der Kempen
1st Schaal Sels
3rd Dwars door het Hageland
5th Ronde van Noord-Holland
7th Overall Ronde de l'Oise
8th Kampioenschap van Vlaanderen
2013
2nd Omloop van het Waasland
2nd Zuid Oost Drenthe Classic I
5th Grote Prijs Wase Polders
6th Arno Wallaard Memorial
