= PureGym =

Fitness club chain in the United Kingdom

- Logo used since 2015
- Type: Private company
- Industry: Health clubs
- Founded: 2009
- Founder: Peter Roberts
- Headquarters: Leeds, West Yorkshire, United Kingdom
- Number of locations: Over 600 gyms (2024)
- Area served: United Kingdom, Switzerland, United States, Denmark, Saudi Arabia, United Arab Emirates
- Key people: Humphrey Cobbold (CEO)
- Owner: Leonard Green & Partners
- Website: puregym.com

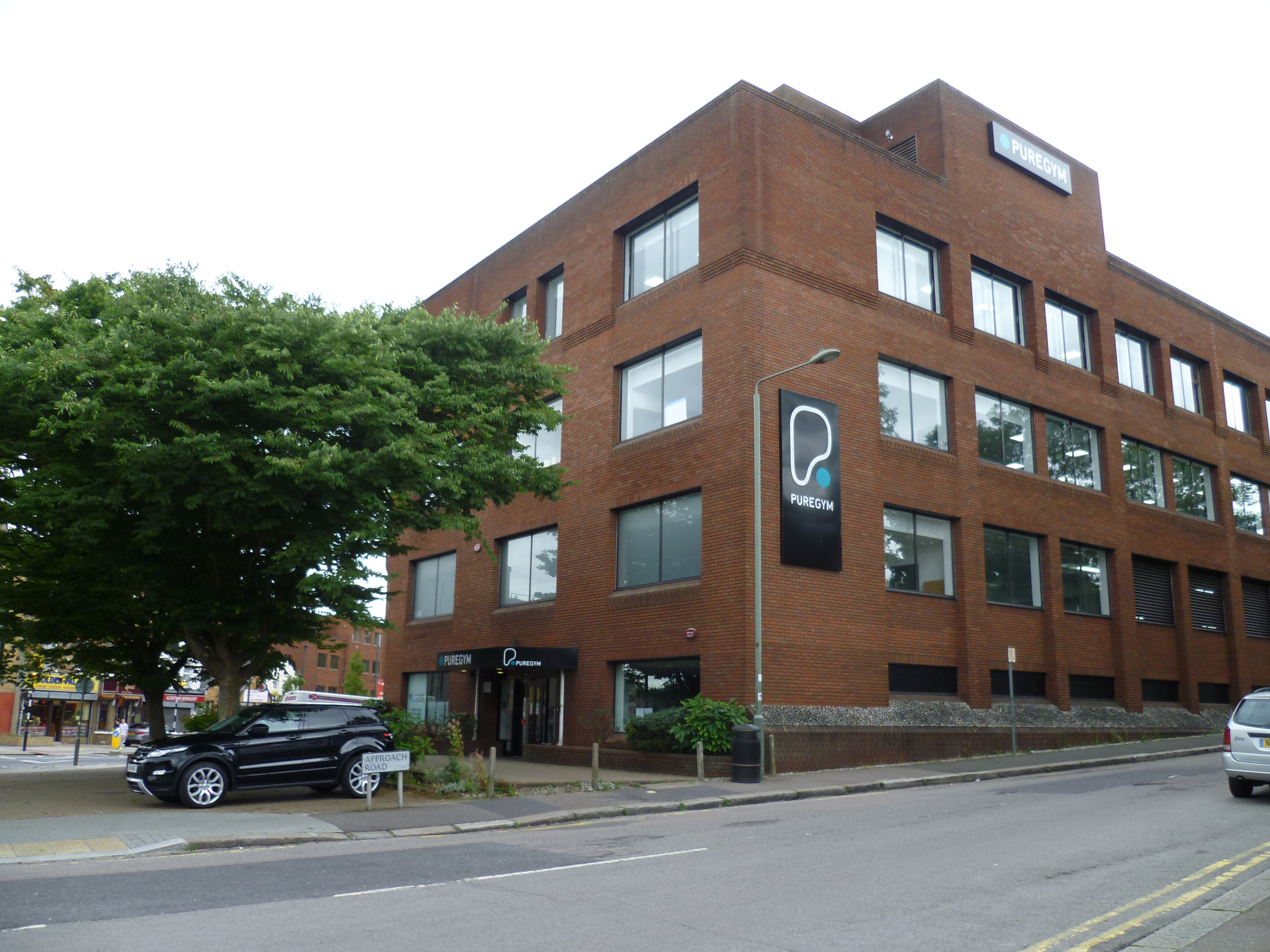
PureGym, New Barnet

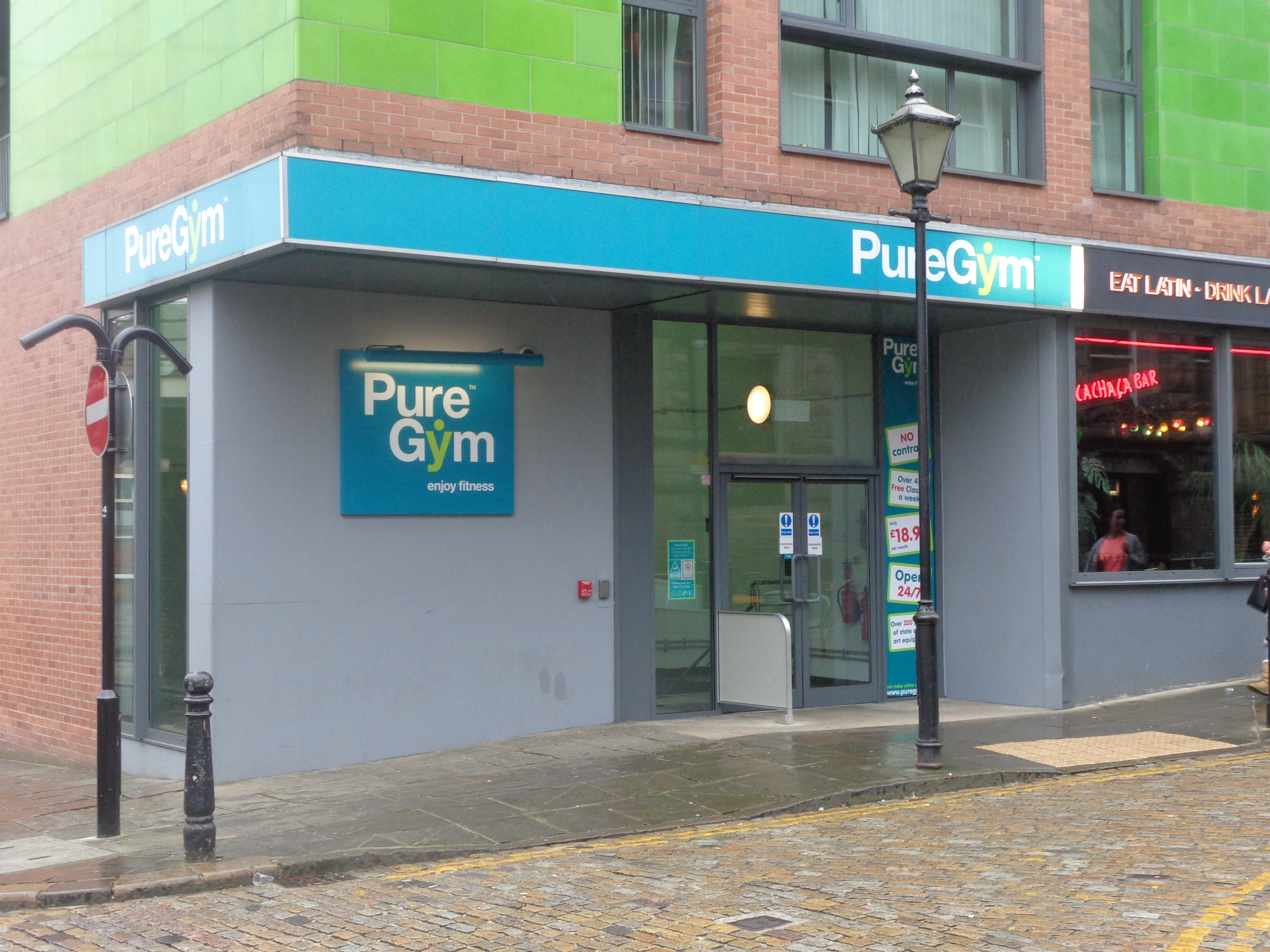
A PureGym club in Leeds

PureGym Limited is a British chain of no-frills health clubs, with headquarters in Leeds. It is Britain's largest gym chain by membership, with over 1,900,000 members registered to their gyms. PureGym also operate gyms in 8 more countries and have over 500 locations worldwide; the newest territory, the UAE, opened in 2022.

In May 2015, PureGym acquired all gyms from rival UK fitness chain LA Fitness, bringing the total number of gyms across the UK to 141. In 2019 an acquisition of Danish chain Fitness World added another approximately 200 centers to the portfolio. As of December 2024, PureGym has 362 gyms in the UK, and 161 in Denmark. Approximately 66% of PureGym's revenue comes from its UK operations.

== Facilities ==
Most locations are open 24 hours a day and offer cardio equipment, fixed and free weights, and exercise classes. There are over 200 pieces of training equipment in most gyms. There are no swimming pools or saunas, which are found in more expensive gyms. To enter some New York gyms, members must scan a QR code on their phone and enter a plexiglass door, with some telling The New York Times that although cameras are monitored, there are sometimes no staff present.

For safety, all PureGyms are monitored by real-time CCTV linked directly to security staff and emergency services. They also have AEDs and first aid kits on site. Most gyms also run weekly fire drills during off-peak hours. However, the New York City Fire Department has issued fire safety violations, as they believe those within the building need "specialized knowledge" to get out in the event of a fire.

== Ownership and management ==
PureGym was privately owned by CCMP Capital and other investors. In 2014, rival The Gym Group attempted to take over PureGym, but abandoned the takeover after it was referred to the Competition and Markets Authority.

In May 2015, PureGym Ltd bought their UK rival LA Fitness for around £60 million to £80 million.

Humphrey Cobbold took over from Peter Roberts as the CEO. Roberts has, in turn, become the CFO, with Adam Bellamy continuing as the non-executive director.

In November 2017 it was bought by Los Angeles–based Leonard Green & Partners for £600 million.

In December 2019 PureGym agreed to buy Danish Fitness World, which also operated in Switzerland and Poland, for £350 million.

In February 2021 Humphrey Cobbold told the BBC that "We are burning about £500,000 a day and that's the average over eight months of closure".

In 2019, PureGym acquired the Swiss basefit.ch. By the end of 2021, all of their facilities will have been renamed and redesigned

It has a 2-star accreditation from Best Companies and a BCI score of 696.6.

PureGym opened in Dubai in 2022. PureGym UAE is headed up by CEO Susan Turner, with operations being handled by John Foy.

In December 2024, PureGym acquired Blink Fitness, a chain of gyms in New York and New Jersey, from Equinox Group for $121 million, outbidding Planet Fitness in a bankruptcy auction. It began rebranding the gyms the following year.

In October 2026, PureGym agreed to acquire Swiss fitness operator NonStop Gym for £235 million. NonStop Gym operated 47 locations, and the acquisition was expected to create a combined network of more than 100 gyms in Switzerland by the end of 2026. The transaction was expected to complete on 2 November 2026.
