= Robert-Jon McCarthy =

Irish-Australian cyclist (born 1994)

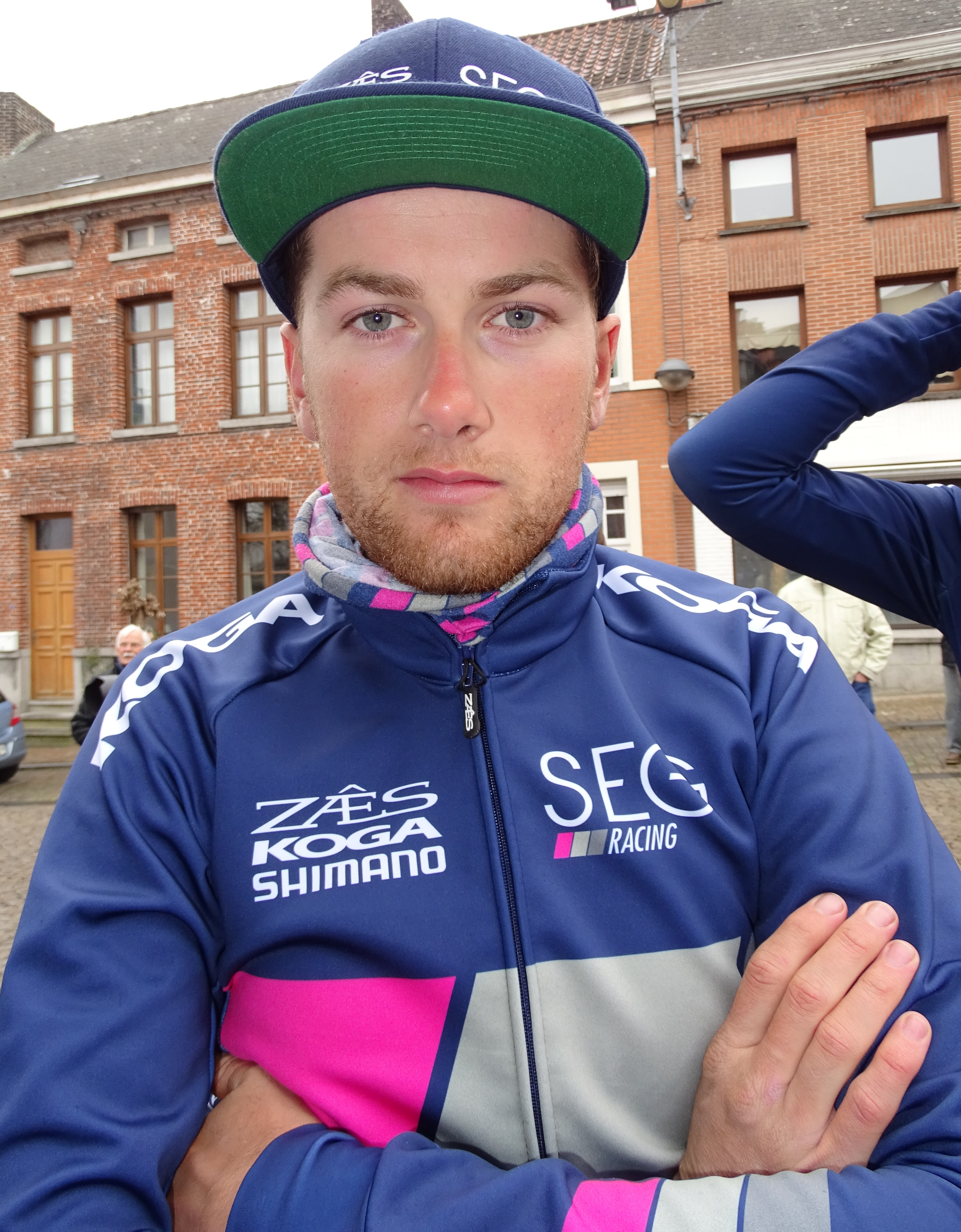
- McCarthy in 2015

Personal information
- Full name: Robert-Jon McCarthy
- Born: 30 March 1994 (age 32) Cork, Ireland

Cycling career
- Sport: Cycling
- Current team: Retired
- Discipline: Road
- Role: Rider

Amateur team
- 2013: Bowden

Professional teams
- 2014: An Post–Chain Reaction
- 2015: SEG Racing
- 2017–2018: JLT–Condor
- 2019: Canyon dhb p/b Bloor Homes

Robert-Jon McCarthy (born 30 March 1994) is an Irish-Australian former road racing cyclist who competed professionally between 2014 and 2019 for the An Post–Chain Reaction, SEG Racing, JLT–Condor and Canyon dhb p/b Bloor Homes teams. He was born in Cork and moved to Australia with his family when he was 14, representing Australia in his early years as a professional before switching his sporting allegiance to Ireland in 2017.

McCarthy had two elite wins in 2014, taking the third stage at the Herald Sun Tour in February and the opening stage at Rás Tailteann in May. He was contracted to An Post–Chain Reaction when taking both victories but was representing the Australia U23 National Team for his win at the Herald Sun Tour.

He took another stage at the Irish race in 2018 riding for JLT–Condor. All three of his wins came in bunch sprints.

== Major results ==
2014
1st Stage 1 Rás Tailteann
1st Stage 3 Herald Sun Tour
2018
1st Stage 2 Rás Tailteann
