= 2005–06 UCI Europe Tour =

Road bicycle race series

- Second edition of the UCI Europe Tour

Details
- Dates: 16 October 2005–12 October 2006
- Location: Europe
- Races: About 300+

Champions
- Individual champion: Niko Eeckhout (BEL) (Chocolade Jacques–Topsport Vlaanderen)
- Teams' champion: Acqua & Sapone
- Nations' champion: Italy

The 2005–06 UCI Europe Tour was the second season of the UCI Europe Tour. The season began on 16 October 2005 with the Chrono des Nations and ended on 12 October 2006 with the Giro del Piemonte.

The points leader, based on the cumulative results of previous races, wears the UCI Europe Tour cycling jersey. Murilo Fischer of Brazil was the defending champion of the 2005 UCI Europe Tour. Niko Eeckhout of Belgium was crowned as the 2005–06 UCI Europe Tour.

Throughout the season, points are awarded to the top finishers of stages within stage races and the final general classification standings of each of the stages races and one-day events. The quality and complexity of a race also determines how many points are awarded to the top finishers, the higher the UCI rating of a race, the more points are awarded.

The UCI ratings from highest to lowest are as follows:

- Multi-day events: 2.HC, 2.1 and 2.2
- One-day events: 1.HC, 1.1 and 1.2

== Events ==
=== 2005 ===
Date	Race name	Location	UCI Rating	Winner	Team	Ref
16 October	Chrono des Nations	France	1.1	Ondřej Sosenka (CZE)	Acqua & Sapone–Adria Mobil	
16 October	Escalada a Montjuïc	Spain	1.2	Samuel Sánchez (ESP)	Euskaltel–Euskadi	
22 October	Firenze–Pistoia	Italy	1.1	Sergiy Matveyev (UKR)	Barloworld	

=== 2006 ===
Date	Race name	Location	UCI Rating	Winner	Team	Ref
31 January	Grand Prix d'Ouverture La Marseillaise	France	1.1	Baden Cooke (AUS)	Unibet.com	
1–5 February	Étoile de Bessèges	France	2.1	Frederik Willems (BEL)	Chocolade Jacques–Topsport Vlaanderen	
4 February	Gran Premio della Costa Etruschi	Italy	1.1	Alessandro Petacchi (ITA)	Team Milram	
5 February	Trofeo Mallorca	Spain	1.1	Isaac Gálvez (ESP)	Caisse d'Epargne–Illes Balears	
6 February	Trofeo Alcúdia	Spain	1.1	Isaac Gálvez (ESP)	Caisse d'Epargne–Illes Balears	
7 February	Trofeo Pollença	Spain	1.1	David Bernabeu (ESP)	Comunidad Valenciana	
8–12 February	Tour Méditerranéen	France	2.1	Cyril Dessel (FRA)	AG2R Prévoyance	
8 February	Trofeo Sóller	Spain	1.1	David Bernabeu (ESP)	Comunidad Valenciana	
9–12 February	Grande Prémio Internacional Costa Azul	Portugal	2.1	Robbie McEwen (AUS)	Davitamon–Lotto	
9 February	Trofeo Calvià	Spain	1.1	David Kopp (GER)	Gerolsteiner	
12–16 February	Vuelta a Andalucía	Spain	2.1	Carlos García Quesada (ESP)	Unibet.com	
14 February	Trofeo Laigueglia	Italy	1.1	Alessandro Ballan (ITA)	Lampre–Fondital	
15–19 February	Volta ao Algarve	Portugal	2.1	João Cabreira (POR)	Maia–Milaneza	
18 February	2006 Tour du Haut Var	France	1.1	Leonardo Bertagnolli (ITA)	Cofidis	
19 February	Classic Haribo	France	1.1	Arnaud Coyot (FRA)	Cofidis	
21–25 February	Volta a la Comunitat Valenciana	Spain	2.1	Antonio Colom (ESP)	Caisse d'Epargne–Illes Balears	
25 February	Gran Premio di Chiasso	Switzerland	1.1	Remmert Wielinga (NED)	Quick-Step–Innergetic	
25 February	Beverbeek Classic	Belgium	1.HC	Evert Verbist (BEL)	Chocolade Jacques–Topsport Vlaanderen	
25 February	2006 Omloop Het Volk	Belgium	1.HC	Philippe Gilbert (BEL)	Française des Jeux	
26 February	2006 Clásica de Almería	Spain	1.1	Francisco Pérez Sanchez (ESP)	Caisse d'Epargne–Illes Balears	
26 February	Gran Premio di Lugano	Switzerland	1.1	Paolo Bettini (ITA)	Quick-Step–Innergetic	
26 February	Kuurne–Brussels–Kuurne	Belgium	1.1	Nick Nuyens (BEL)	Quick-Step–Innergetic	

== Final standings ==
There is a competition for the rider, team and country with the most points gained from winning or achieving a high place in the above races.

=== Individual classification ===
Rank	Name	Points
1	Niko Eeckhout (BEL)	709
2	Danilo Hondo (GER)	688
3	Rinaldo Nocentini (ITA)	582
4	Sergey Kolesnikov (RUS)	514
5	Luca Mazzanti (ITA)	491
6	Baden Cooke (AUS)	454
7	Alexander Khatuntsev (RUS)	451
8	Andrea Tonti (ITA)	441
9	Ricardo Serrano (ESP)	379
10	Ruslan Pidgornyy (UKR)	358

=== Team classification ===
Rank	Team	Points
1	Acqua & Sapone	1751
2	Unibet.com	1665
3	Omnibike Dynamo Moscow	1509
4	Rabobank Continental Team	1489
5	Chocolade Jacques–Topsport Vlaanderen	1475
6	Ceramica Panaria–Navigare	1416
7	Perutnina Ptuj	1242
8	Barloworld	1225
9	Wiesenhof–AKUD	1177
10	Comunidad Valenciana	1130

=== Nation classification ===
Rank	Nation	Points
1	Italy	3264
2	Germany	2485
3	Belgium	2373
4	Spain	2368
5	Russia	2277.32
6	Netherlands	2172
7	Poland	1793.32
8	Slovenia	1552
9	France	1449
10	Ukraine	1292
