= Stephen Gallagher (cyclist) =

Racing cyclist and coach from Northern Ireland

Personal information
- Full name: Stephen Gallagher
- Born: 9 July 1980 (age 46) Armagh, Northern Ireland

Cycling career
- Sport: Cycling
- Discipline: Road
- Role: Rider

Professional teams
- 2003: Team Endurasport.com-Principia
- 2004–2005: Flanders-Afin.com
- 2006: Giant Asia Racing Team
- 2007–2009: Murphy & Gunn–Newlyn–M.Donnelly–Sean Kelly
- 2010: Sigma Sport–Specialized

Stephen Gallagher (born 9 July 1980 in Armagh, Northern Ireland) is an Irish professional cyclist and cycling coach, who last rode for the British continental cycling team Sigma Sport–Specialized. He previously rode for the An Post–M.Donnelly–Grant Thornton–Sean Kelly team.

He moved to France to pursue his cycling career at the age of 17, riding as an amateur for four years, before turning professional in 2003. Gallagher took his biggest win when he won the general classification of the 2008 FBD Insurance Rás.

He missed most of the 2009 season due to a family illness.

Gallagher established the coaching firm Dig Deep Coaching in 2011. He was technical director of the Northern Irish team for the Gran Partenza of the 2014 Giro d'Italia.

== Major results ==
2000

- 9th, Irish National Road Race Championship

2004 – Flanders Cycling team

- 3rd, Irish National Time Trial Championship

2005 – Flanders Cycling team

- 4th, Irish National Time Trial Championship
- 23rd, CSC Classic
- 39th, Scheldeprijs Vlaanderen

2006 – Giant Asia Racing Team

- 1st overall, Tour de Taiwan
- 3rd overall, Tour of Thailand
  - 3rd, Stage 3,
  - 4th, Stage 1,
- 45th overall, Tour of Indonesia (2.2)
  - 2nd, Stage 5
  - 13th, Stage 1

2007 – Murphy & Gunn–Newlyn–M.Donnelly–Sean Kelly

- 6th overall, FBD Insurance Rás (2.2)
  - 5th, Stage 6
  - 6th, Stage 4
  - 7th, Stage 5

2008 – An Post–M.Donnelly–Grant Thornton–Sean Kelly

- 1st overall, FBD Insurance Rás (2.2)
  - 3rd, Stage 2
  - 3rd, Stage 6
  - 7th, Stage 1
  - 9th, Stage 4
- 7th, Stage 1, XLII Cinturón Ciclista a Mallorca (2.2)
- 11th overall, Ronde de l'Oise (2.2)
  - 8th, Stage 4
  - 9th, Stage 5
- 29th overall, Volta Ciclista da Ascension (2.2)
- 62nd overall, Tour of Britain (2.1)
- 130th overall, Tour of Algarve (2.1)

2009 – An Post–M.Donnelly–Grant Thornton–Sean Kelly

- 53rd overall, Tour of Algarve (2.1)
  - 47th, Stage 3
  - 73rd, Stage 5
  - 93rd, Stage 2

2010 – Sigma Sport–Specialized

- 1st, Wallace Caldwell Memorial Road Race
- 2nd overall, Suir Valley 3 day
  - 1st, Stage 4
  - 4th, Stage 3 (ITT)
  - 4th, Stage 2
  - 10th, Stage 1
- 2nd, Ben McKenna Memorial Road Race
- 6th, East Midlands International Cicle Classic (1.2)
- 26th overall, FBD Insurance Ras (2.2)
  - 9th, Stage 4
- 53rd overall, Tour of Britain (2.1)
  - 23rd, Stage 2

2011
5th Ryedale Grand Prix
