= Humphrey Cobbold =

British business executive (born 1964)

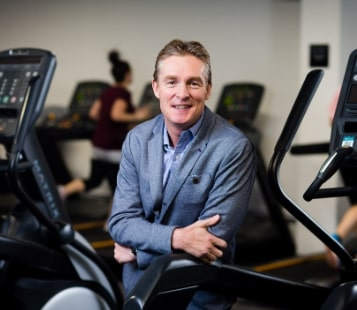
- Humphrey Cobbold at PureGym
- Born: Humphrey Michael Cobbold; 13 November 1964 (age 61); Nairobi, Kenya
- Education: University of Cambridge; INSEAD
- Title: Chair, PureGym
- Spouse: Nicola Hacker (m. 1991)
- Children: 3
- Relatives: Robert Runcie (uncle)

Humphrey Michael Cobbold (born 13 November 1964) is the chair of PureGym, a UK gym operator. He joined the business in 2015 when there were 84 gyms, which are now approximately 700 in number.

== Early life and education ==
Cobbold was born on 13 November 1964 in Nairobi, Kenya. He attended Bromsgrove School, an independent boarding and day school in the Worcestershire town of Bromsgrove. Cobbold was taught in secondary school by prominent UK politician Edwina Currie. He then attended the University of Cambridge and INSEAD, from which he obtained an MBA.

== Career ==
In September 2009, Humphrey Cobbold began his position as the CEO of Wiggle Ltd., a UK-based online retailer of cycling and triathlon-related products. He headed the company during the period when Bridgepoint was in the process of acquiring it. In late 2013, Cobbold departed from Wiggle, with Stefan Barden succeeding him in September of that year. Upon leaving Wiggle, Cobbold stated, “I have had the privilege to work with a truly fabulous group of colleagues and business partners over the last four years. The time is now right for someone else to lead the peloton and take Wiggle forward to future success.” He has since been linked to a bid to buy the internet retailer sofa.com.

He is a former chairman of Fish4, a British recruitment website, as well as the Director of Strategic Development and executive committee member of Trinity Mirror. Before joining Fish4 and Trinity Mirror, he was a partner and the co-head of the UK media practice for the global management consulting firm McKinsey & Company.

Since 2013, Cobbold has been the CEO of PureGym, a network of over 400 gyms with more than 1.1 million members. In 2019 PureGym acquired Fitness World.

== Personal life ==
Cobbold is married to Nicola and has three children. His brother Tim is the former chief executive of UBM plc. Cobbold is the nephew of Robert Runcie, the former Archbishop of Canterbury.
