= Paídi O'Brien =

Páidí O'Brien
Personal information
- Full name: Páidí O'Brien
- Born: 13 February 1984 (age 42) Cork, Ireland

Cycling career
- Sport: Cycling
- Current team: Osborne Meats–McCarthy Cycles
- Disciplines: Road, track
- Role: Rider

Amateur teams
- 2003: Vélo-Club La Pomme Marseille
- 2005: Lochnes
- 2011: SportActive Engraveit
- 2012: Dan Morrissey Speed-spokes
- 2013: Planet Tri
- 2014–: Osbourne Butchers–Edge Sports

Professional team
- 2006–2010: Sean Kelly ACLVB–M.Donnelly

Páidí O'Brien (born 13 February 1984 in Cork, Ireland) is a retired Irish professional road racing cyclist. He won the Irish National Championships Under-23 Road Race twice, and had five podium finishes in the Elite Road Race.

== Career ==
=== Early amateur career (2002-2005) ===
He rode with amateur teams in Ireland and France, and was selected to ride for the Irish National Team at elite events including the Tour of Britain and Tour de Langkawi. He was the winner of the Irish National Championships Junior Road Race in 2002 and the Under-23 Road Race in 2005.

=== Professional career (2006-2010) ===
O'Brien turned professional in 2006 and joined Sean Kelly ACLVB–M.Donnelly in its debut year, winning a second consecutive under-23 national road race title and finishing third in the elite event that season. He spent five years with the squad and was involved in its first ever professional victory at the 2008 Vuelta a Extremadura, an opening stage team time trial. O'Brien crossed the line first and wore the leader's jersey on the second stage of the race before losing nine seconds and the jersey to teammate Benny De Schrooder on stage two. The team's success in the time trial laid the foundation for Daniel Lloyd to take the overall victory for the Irish team.

He came closest to an individual victory in a UCI Europe Tour race in 2007 at Rás Tailteann, known at the time as FBD Insurance Rás. O'Brien came second on stages one, three and five, and finished in second place overall behind future four-time World Time Trial Champion Tony Martin. He also took a stage podium at the 2008 Cinturón Ciclista a Mallorca, finishing third on stage two, and had top-ten results at the 2006 Druivenkoers Overijse and Ronde van Overijssel in 2008.

=== Later amateur career (2011-2020) ===
He remained active after leaving the professional ranks at the end of 2010, competing in either the National Championships or Rás Tailteann every year except 2016 until his retirement from road cycling at the end of 2018. He was the 2013 Irish National Criterium Champion and would take his fifth and final Irish National Championship Road Race podium with a third-place finish in 2014. He also turned his hand to cyclocross, finishing ninth in the Irish national championship race in 2019 and nineteenth in 2020.

== Major results ==
2002
1st National Junior Road Race Championships
2003
2nd National Under-23 Road Race Championships
2004
3rd National Under-23 Road Race Championships
2005
1st National Under-23 Road Race Championships
2006
1st National Under-23 Road Race Championships
3rd National Road Race Championships
7th Druivenkoers Overijse
2007
2nd National Road Race Championships
2nd Overall Rás Tailteann
2008
1st Stage 1 (TTT) Vuelta a Extremadura
2nd National Road Race Championships
10th Overall Rás Tailteann
10th Ronde van Overijssel
2009
3rd National Road Race Championships
2012
1st National Intervarsity Road Race Championships
2nd National Intervarsity Time Trial Championships
3rd National Criterium Championships
2013
1st National Criterium Championships
2014
3rd National Road Race Championships
2015
2nd National Criterium Championships
