= Kurt Bogaerts =

Belgian cycling coach

Personal information
- Born: 8 July 1977 (age 49)

Cycling career
- Sport: Cycling
- Current team: Pinarello–Q36.5 Pro Cycling Team
- Discipline: Road
- Role: Rider; Directeur sportif

Professional team
- 2006: Sean Kelly ACLVB–M.Donnelly

Managerial teams
- 2007–2017: An Post–Chain Reaction
- 2010: Lotto Ladies Team
- 2013–2016: Wiggle–Honda
- 2018–2019: WIGGINS
- 2021–2024: INEOS Grenadiers
- 2025–: Q36.5 Pro Cycling Team

Kurt Bogaerts (born 8 July 1977) is a Belgian cycling coach, team director and retired professional road racing cyclist. He currently works for Swiss UCI ProSeries team Q36.5 Pro Cycling as Head of Technical Performance.

After competing in road racing from 1999 to 2005 as an independent rider, in 2006 he joined the Sean Kelly ACLVB–M.Donnelly squad. He retired from racing after the season and began his managerial and coaching career with the team in 2007. In 2021 he joined UCI World Tour team Ineos Grenadiers as an assistant directeur sportif before following his protegé Tom Pidcock to Q36.5 for the 2025 season.

== Cycling career ==
As an independent rider, Bogaerts competed primarily in one-day races in his native Belgium. His highest placings were 22nd in the 2002 Memorial Philippe Van Coningsloo and 23rd in the 2000 GP Stad Vilvoorde.

After joining Sean Kelly ACLVB–M.Donnelly in 2006, he competed in his first and only professional stage race at Rás Tailteann, known that year as FBD Insurance Ras. Bogaerts finished in 72nd place overall, with a best placing of 25th on stage five.

At the age of 29, he retired from professional cycling at the end of the 2006 season.

== Management and coaching career ==
=== Murphy & Gunn–Newlyn–M.Donnelly–Sean Kelly (2007-2017) ===
Bogaerts stayed with the team after his retirement and worked alongside Sean Kelly as Team Manager for eleven seasons. During this period he also spent time with Lotto Ladies and Wiggle–Honda as an assistant directeur sportif.

The first professional victory of Bogaerts' managerial career was stage one of the 2008 Vuelta a Extremadura, a team time trial in Mérida, Spain. Team riders wore the leaders' jersey on every subsequent stage, with Daniel Lloyd taking the overall victory. Known as An Post–Chain Reaction in its later years, the team took further overall victories on the UCI Europe Tour under Bogaerts' management at races including Rás Tailteann in Ireland and Ronde de l'Oise in France, as well as one-day and stage victories at higher-category races including Schaal Sels in Belgium and the Tour of Britain.

The team was based in Belgium at the Sean Kelly Academy in Merchtem, but was registered in Kelly's home country of Ireland. Bogaerts was instrumental in moving registration to Belgium in 2010, stating that it would allow the team to race in ten to twenty more events per season. The squad returned to Irish registration in 2014 and remained there until it disbanded at the end of the 2017 season.

=== Ineos Grenadiers (2021-2024) ===
Having spent 2018 and 2019 at Team Wiggins Le Col, Bogaerts joined Ineos Grenadiers in 2021 as a coach and assistant directeur sportif. Bogaerts first worked with Tom Pidcock when they were together at Team Wiggins and the pair were reunited when Bogaerts joined the Ineos staff. Bogaerts worked closely with Pidcock as he began to excel at the top level of multiple cycling disciplines, with Pidcock claiming two Olympic Mountain Biking gold medals and road race victories at the 2023 Strade Bianche, 2024 Amstel Gold Race and stage twelve at the 2022 Tour de France, a summit finish atop Alpe d'Huez.

In addition to working with Dylan van Baarle for his victory at 2022 Paris–Roubaix, Bogaerts also coached Pauline Ferrand-Prévot to victory in the Women's Mountain Bike race at the 2024 Summer Olympics, meaning he had coached the winner in three of the four races in the discipline across the 2020 and 2024 Games.

=== Q36.5 Pro Cycling Team (2025) ===
In December 2024, it was announced that Bogaerts would follow Tom Pidcock from Ineos Grenadiers to Swiss UCI ProSeries team Q36.5 Pro Cycling and take up the role of Head of Technical Performance. Discussing the move, Bogaerts said "It’s very special to continue working with Tom. I have been part of his career since 2018, and we achieved great results together." The move paid immediate dividends, with Pidcock taking two stage wins, the points classification and the overall victory in his first race for the team at the 2025 AlUla Tour.
