= An Post–Chain Reaction =

Cycling team

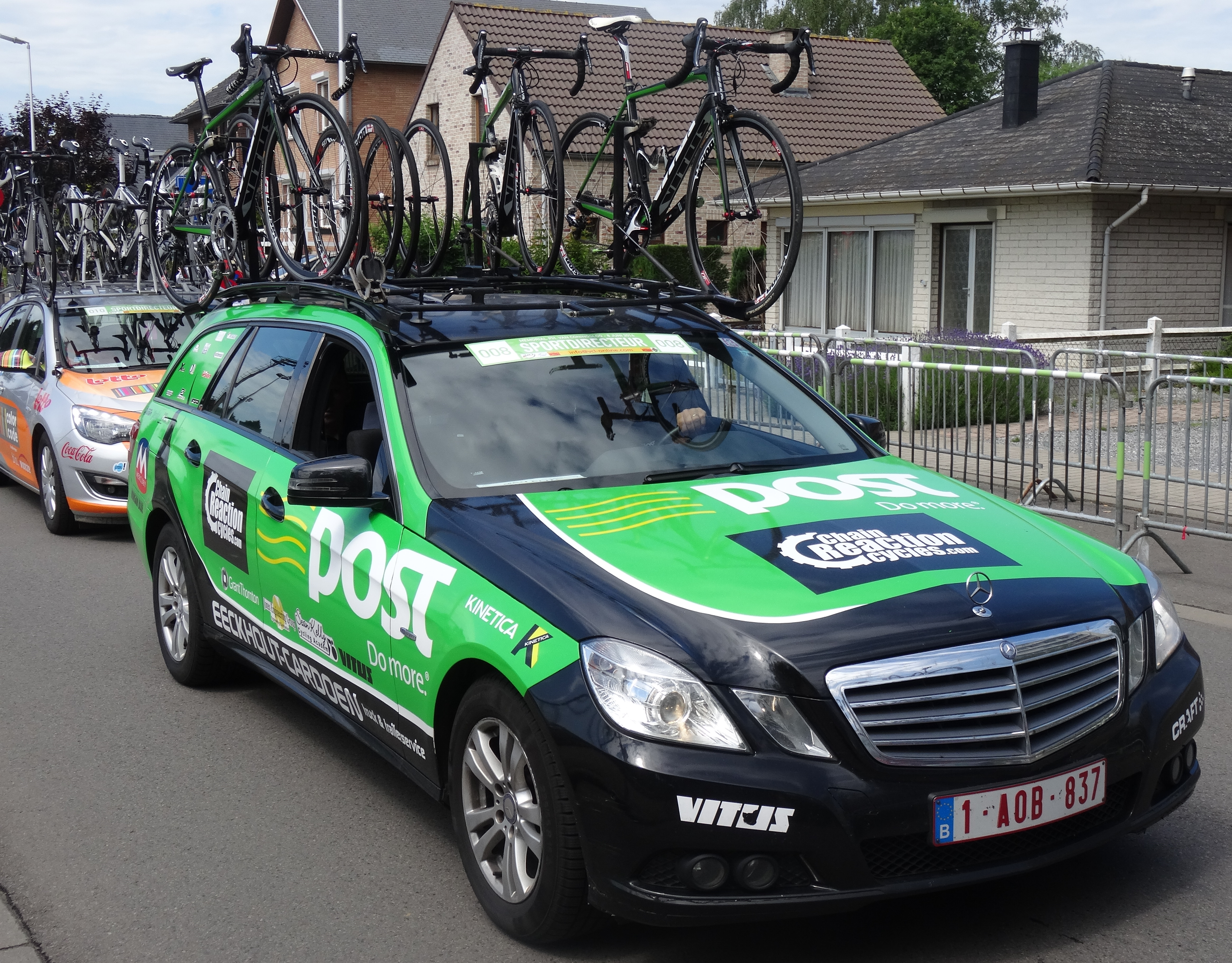
- An Post–Chain Reaction team car at the 2014 Memorial Philippe Van Coningsloo

Team information
- UCI code: SKT
- Registered: Ireland (2006-09, 2014-17); Belgium (2010-13)
- Founded: 2006
- Disbanded: 2017
- Discipline: Road
- Status: UCI Continental
- Bicycles: Vitus
- Website: Team home page

Key personnel
- General manager: Kurt Bogaerts
- Team manager: Niko Eeckhout

Team name history
- 2006 2007 2008–2011 2012 2013–2017: Sean Kelly ACLVB–M Donnelly; Murphy & Gunn–Newlyn–M Donnelly–Sean Kelly; An Post–M Donnelly–Grant Thornton–Sean Kelly; An Post–Sean Kelly; An Post–Chain Reaction
An Post–Chain Reaction jersey
Jersey

An Post–Chain Reaction (UCI team code: SKT) was an Irish-Belgian professional cycling team that competed at UCI Continental level. The squad was managed by Sean Kelly and Kurt Bogaerts.

It contested one-day and stage races at events across Europe, with riders taking overall victories on the UCI Europe Tour at races including Vuelta a Extremadura in Spain, Rás Tailteann in Ireland and Ronde de l'Oise in France. There were also successes in higher-category races including the one-day Schaal Sels in Belgium and two stage wins at the Tour of Britain. Six elite national road and time trial championships were won by riders contracted to the team.

The squad was based in Belgium at the Sean Kelly Academy in the Flanders town of Merchtem. It was originally registered as an Irish team before switching to Belgian registration in 2010 to gain access to more races in that country. The team became Irish-registered again in 2014 and declared an ambition to move up to professional continental level. However, the team disbanded at the end of the 2017 season after failing to find sponsorship for 2018.

== 2006 season ==
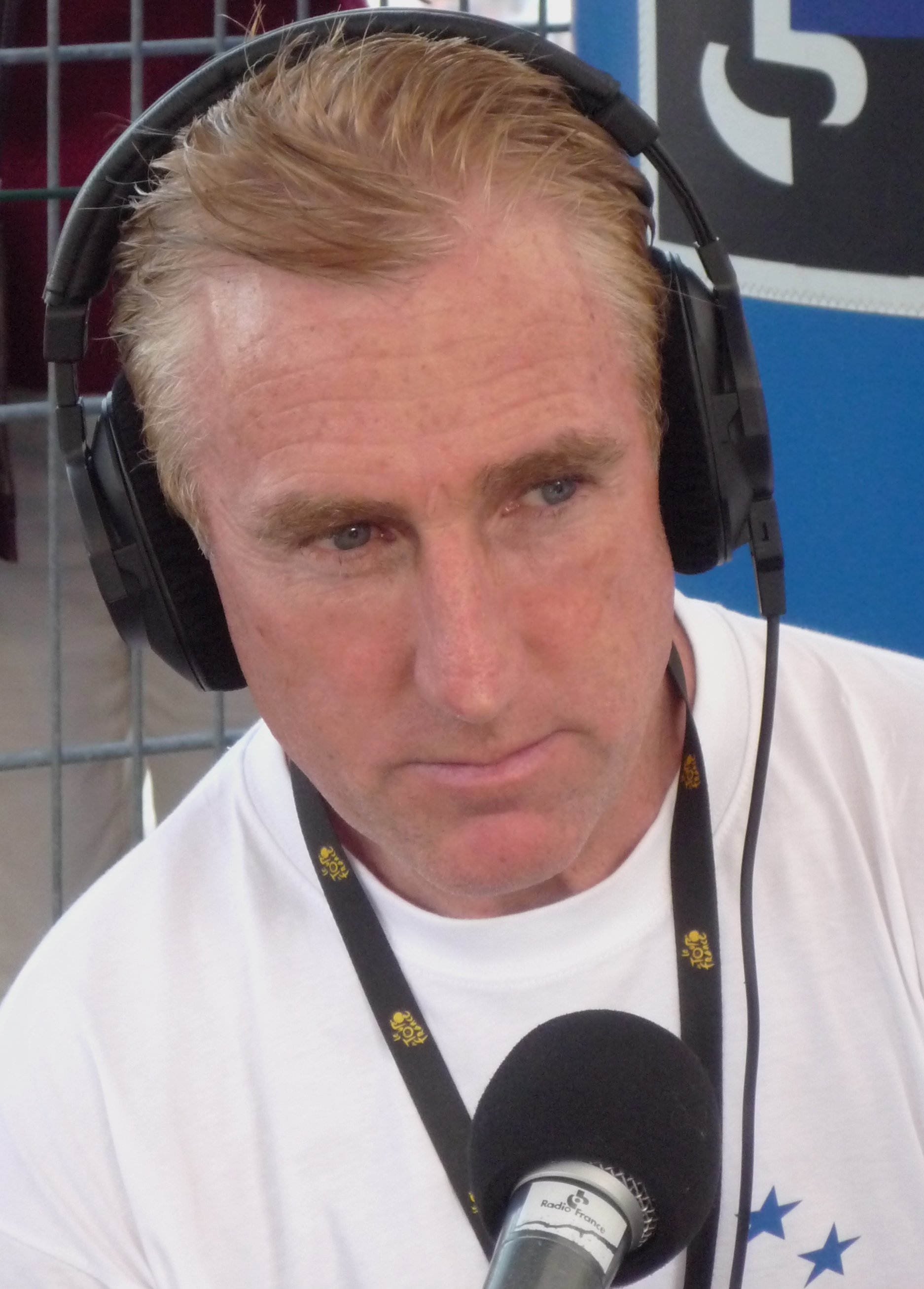
Team founder Sean Kelly

1988 Vuelta a España champion and seven-time Paris–Nice winner Sean Kelly launched the first Irish professional cycling team in 2006 with the name Sean Kelly ACLVB–M Donnelly. Its sponsors were ACLVB, the General Confederation of Liberal Trade Unions of Belgium, and M Donnelly, a Dublin-registered company with interests in various technical, sporting and commercial lines of business.

The team did not win a race in its debut season but there were podium finishes for Jehudi Schoonacker on stage seven of Rás Tailteann, known at that time as FBD Insurance Rás, and Paídi O'Brien in the Irish National Championships Road Race.

Eighteen riders competed for the team in its first year, ten from Ireland and eight from Belgium. Kurt Bogaerts was part of the Belgian contingent in his final year as a professional cyclist. He was appointed general manager of the team for the 2007 season.

== 2007 season ==
Murphy & Gunn–Newlyn, another Irish continental team, was launched later in 2006. For the 2007 season, the two teams merged to form the Murphy & Gunn–Newlyn–M Donnelly–Sean Kelly squad.

The wait for a first victory would go on but Paídi O'Brien finished second overall at FBD Insurance Rás after taking second place finishes on stages one, three and five. Future four-time World Time Trial Champion Tony Martin took the overall win by seventeen seconds. O'Brien also finished second in the Irish National Championships Road Race, with teammate Mark Cassidy in third.

At the end of 2007, it was announced that the team would retain three title sponsors as well as the name of its founder for 2008. An Post, the national postal service of Ireland, would replace Murphy & Gunn as main sponsor while professional services company Grant Thornton replaced the Newlyn group as a co-sponsor.

== 2008 season ==
For the 2008 season, the team now known as An Post–M Donnelly–Grant Thornton–Sean Kelly became more international after fielding just one rider from outside Belgium and Ireland in its first two seasons. Professionals from Britain, Sweden, Germany and the Netherlands joined the one Belgian and four Irish riders that remained with the team after 2007.

The team's breakthrough success came at the 2008 Vuelta a Extremadura. The team was victorious on stage 1, a team time trial, with a margin of thirty seconds to Madeinox-Boavista in second place. Paidi O'Brien crossed the line first and wore the leader's jersey on stage two before it passed to teammate Benny De Schrooder on stage three. The Belgian held the jersey until the end of stage four, with English rider Daniel Lloyd taking the lead into the fifth and final stage. Lloyd finished in the leading group to seal a first overall victory for himself and the team by 36 seconds.

2008 also saw overall victories for Stephen Gallagher at FBD Insurance Rás in Ireland and Daniel Fleeman at the Tour des Pyrénées which was held in France and Spain.

Lloyd and Fleeman left the team after the 2008 season, both joining Cervélo TestTeam.

== 2009 season ==
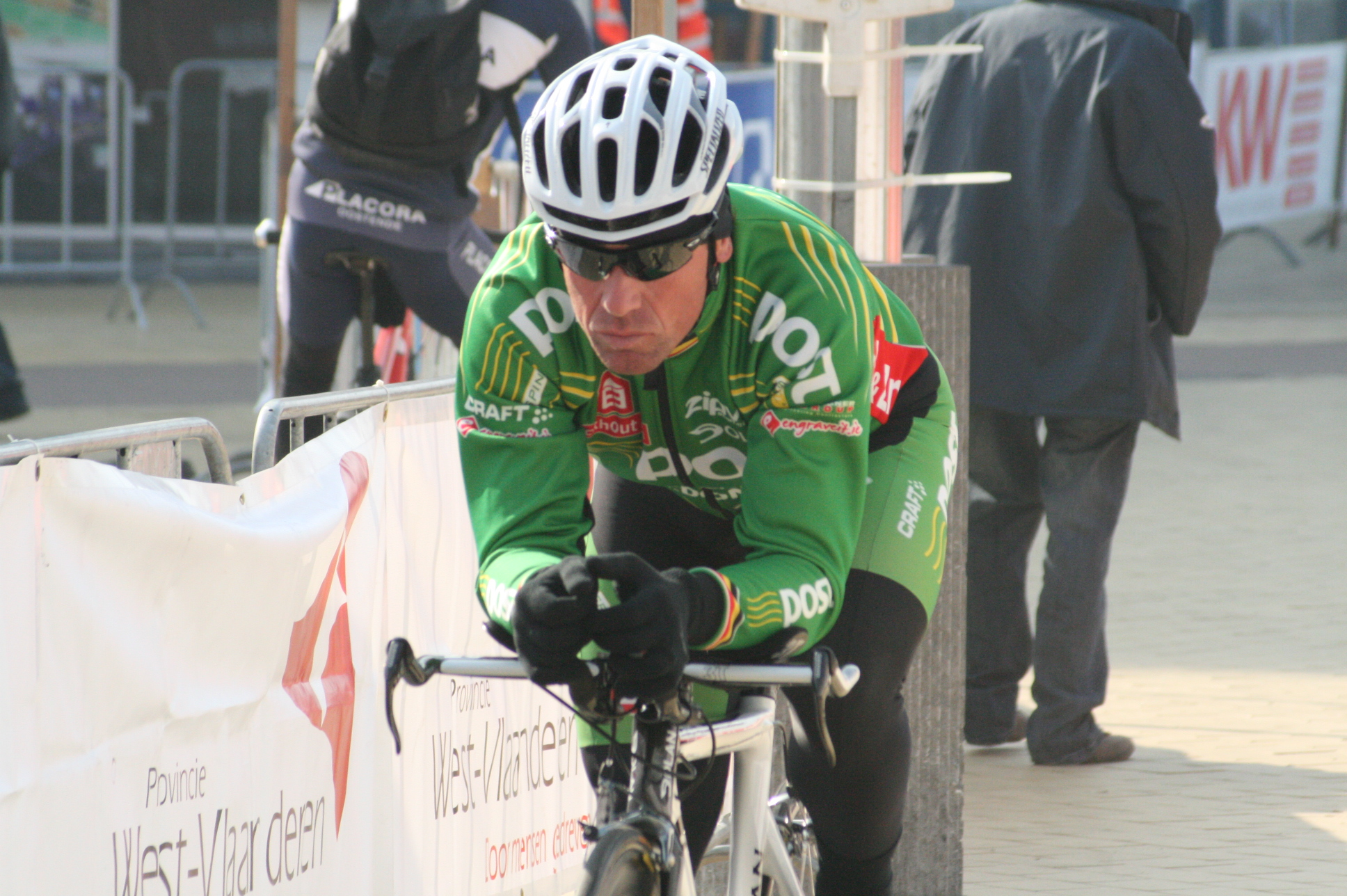
Niko Eeckhout

The team took six professional victories in 2009, of which five went to former Belgian National Road Race Champion Niko Eeckhout in his first season with the team. The thirty-eight year old two-time Dwars door Vlaanderen winner said this would be his last professional team and that he had already discussed moving into management with team boss Sean Kelly and general manager Kurt Bogaerts. He also brought new sponsors, with the construction and truck repair companies owned by his brothers giving financial and logistical support to the team.

Eeckhout followed up the team's 2008 success at the Vuelta a Extremadura with two stage victories at the Spanish race, and took a stage and the points jersey at Rás Tailteann. He also scored one-day race wins at Grote Prijs Stad Zottegem and Memorial Rik Van Steenbergen, as well as a second-place finish at Dwars door Vlaanderen.

Steven Van Vooren took the other win with overall victory at Ronde de l'Oise. David O'Loughlin and Paidi O'Brien finished second and third respectively in the Irish National Cycling Championships road race.

== 2010 season ==
The team switched registration from Ireland to Belgium for the 2010 season. Despite being based in Flanders, the team's owners and sponsors were Irish and had maintained its official domicile there since launching in 2006. However, being a foreign-registered team competing below the Professional Continental level meant the team was ineligible for many Belgian races, including the Tour of Belgium and E3 Harelbeke. Team General Manager Kurt Bogaerts noted that moving to Professional Continental level would be prohibitively expensive, but switching to Belgium was possible as long as there were at least eight Belgian riders in the squad. He expected this would allow the team to compete in 10-20 more races per season.

A rider from the team claimed a national championship for the first time when Matt Brammeier took the first of his four consecutive victories in the Irish National Cycling Championships road race. Liverpool-born Brammeier had previously represented Great Britain but switched his allegiance to Ireland prior to the 2010 season. Nico Eeckhout took stage wins at Ronde de l'Oise and Etoile de Bessèges, and Mark Cassidy and David O'Loughlin both won a stage at FBD Insurance Rás.

== 2011 season ==
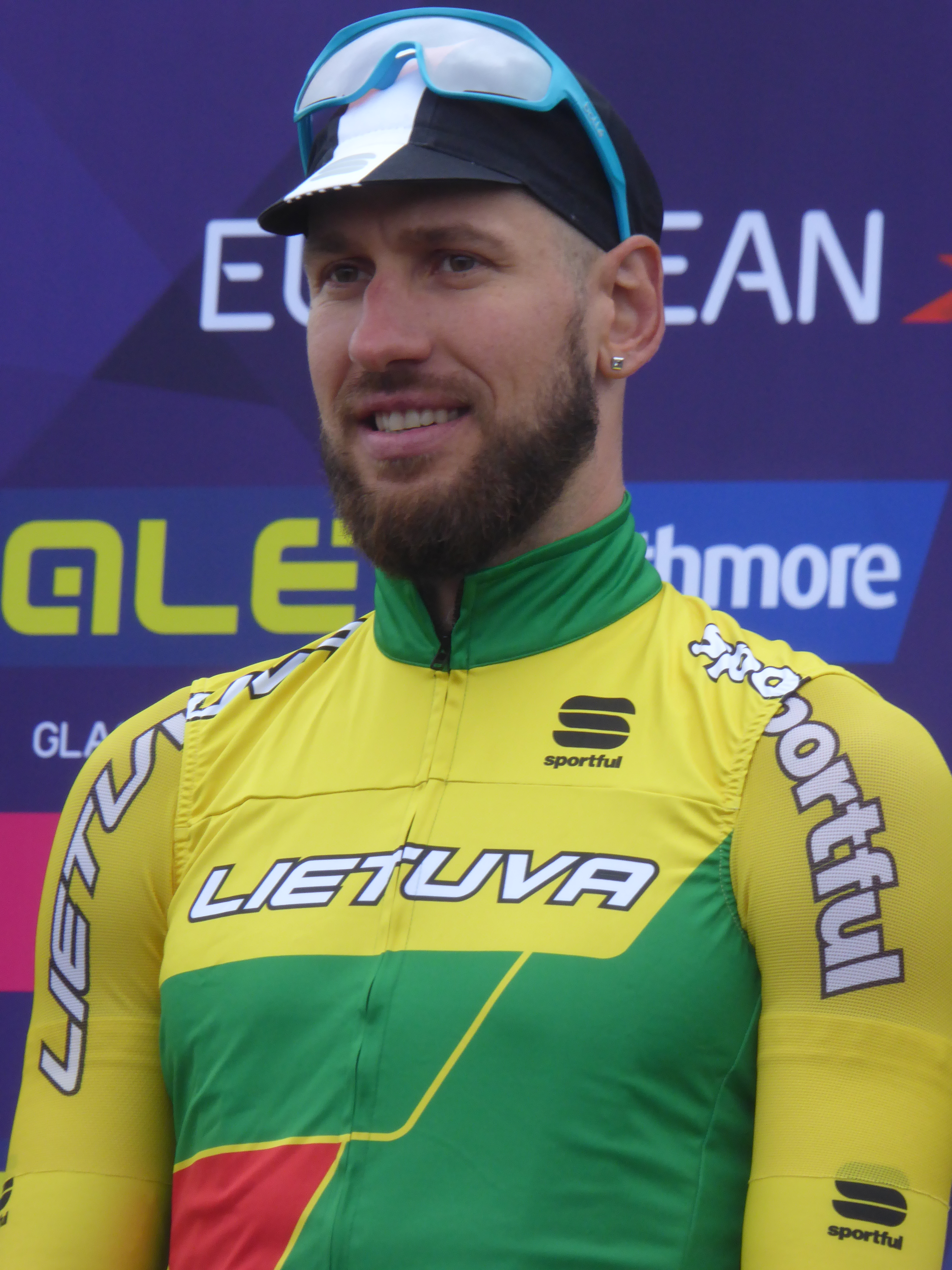
Gediminas Bagdonas

Lithuanian rider Gediminas Bagdonas joined the team for 2011 and quickly established himself as a stand-out performer. Bagdonas delighted the team's title sponsor at Rás Tailteann, which became known that year as An Post Rás, with wins on stages two and four on his way to the overall victory. He won a stage on his way to another overall victory at Ronde de l'Oise before taking his second Lithuanian National Time Trial Championships title. He rounded out a fine year with victory on stage seven ahead of a high-quality field at the 2011 Tour of Britain.

An Post also signed the promising Irish sprinter Sam Bennett who quickly showed his quality with second place on stage one of An Post Rás. The future winner of stages at all three Grand Tour races would take his first victory for the team at Grote Prijs Stad Geel. Andrew Fenn took a stage at Le Tour de Bretagne Cycliste and won the one-day race Memorial Philippe Van Coningsloo. Nico Eeckhout's sole victory came early in the year at Driedaagse van West-Vlaanderen and Mark McNally claimed overall victory at the Mi-août en Bretagne.

== 2012 season ==
The team name changed to An Post–Sean Kelly for the 2012 season after sponsorship arrangements ended with Grant Thornton and M Donnelly.

Gediminas Bagdonas had another strong season, taking five victories representing An Post. These included his first Lithuanian National Road Race Championships title, two stages of An Post Rás and victories in the one-day Memorial Philippe Van Coningsloo and Ronde van Noord-Holland races. He also won three stages and the overall victory at the Baltic Chain Tour representing the Lithuania national team, finished 3rd in his national time trial championships, came 59th in the 2012 Olympic Games road race and took the points jersey at An Post Rás.

Aged forty-one, Nico Eeckhout scored two of the biggest one-day wins in the team's history with victories at Schaal Sels and Omloop der Kempen. Roy Jans claimed the Kattekoers, a race Eeckhout had won twenty years previously, and Kenneth Vanbilsen took the win at Ronde van Vlaanderen U23 representing the Belgian National Team.

Bagdonas left the team at the end of 2012, joining Ag2r–La Mondiale.

== 2013 season ==
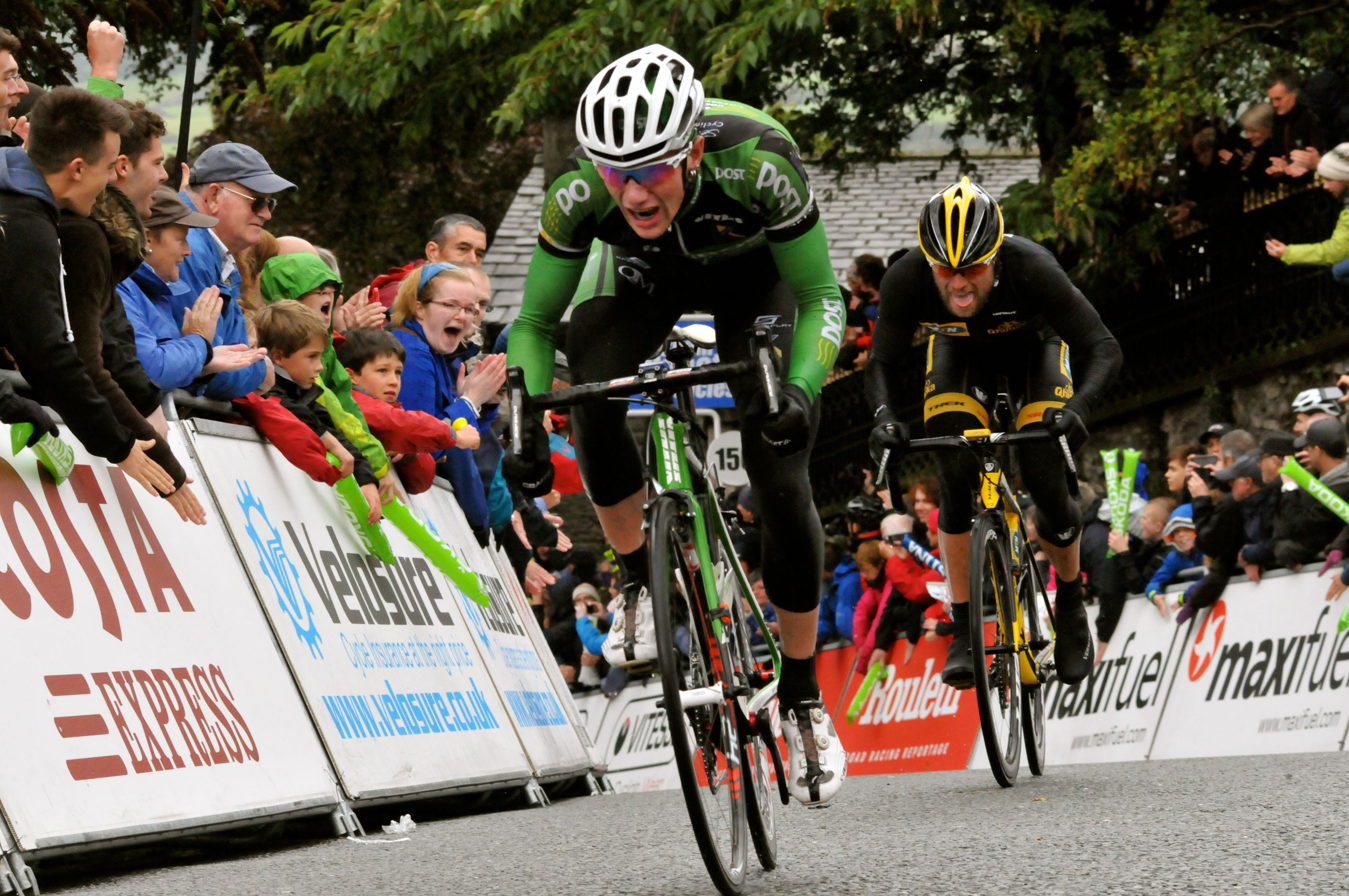
Sam Bennett at the 2013 Tour of Britain

The team brought in a new co-sponsor and became known as An Post–Chain Reaction. Chain Reaction Cycles was a Northern Irish cycling business that began as a bike shop in Ballynure and by 2013 had grown into an international retailer. This was also the final year that the team was registered in Belgium.

The squad achieved five professional wins in 2013, all of which were individual stages. Sam Bennett took three of these, winning stage five at the 2013 Tour of Britain and stages three and eight at An Post Rás. He also came second on stage two at the Tour of Britain, losing out to Gerald Ciolek in the sprint to the line. Bennett joined NetApp–Endura, later known as Bora–Hansgrohe, at the end of the season.

Shane Archbold took a stage win at the Rás, and Olympic and Commonwealth Games medallist Glenn O'Shea won a stage at Ronde de l'Oise before transferring to Garmin-Sharp in midseason. Jack Wilson was the Ireland Under-23 Road Race champion.

Niko Eeckhout had two podium results and retired at the end of the season at the age of forty-three. As planned when he joined the team in 2009, he remained with the squad as a directeur sportif.

== 2014 season ==
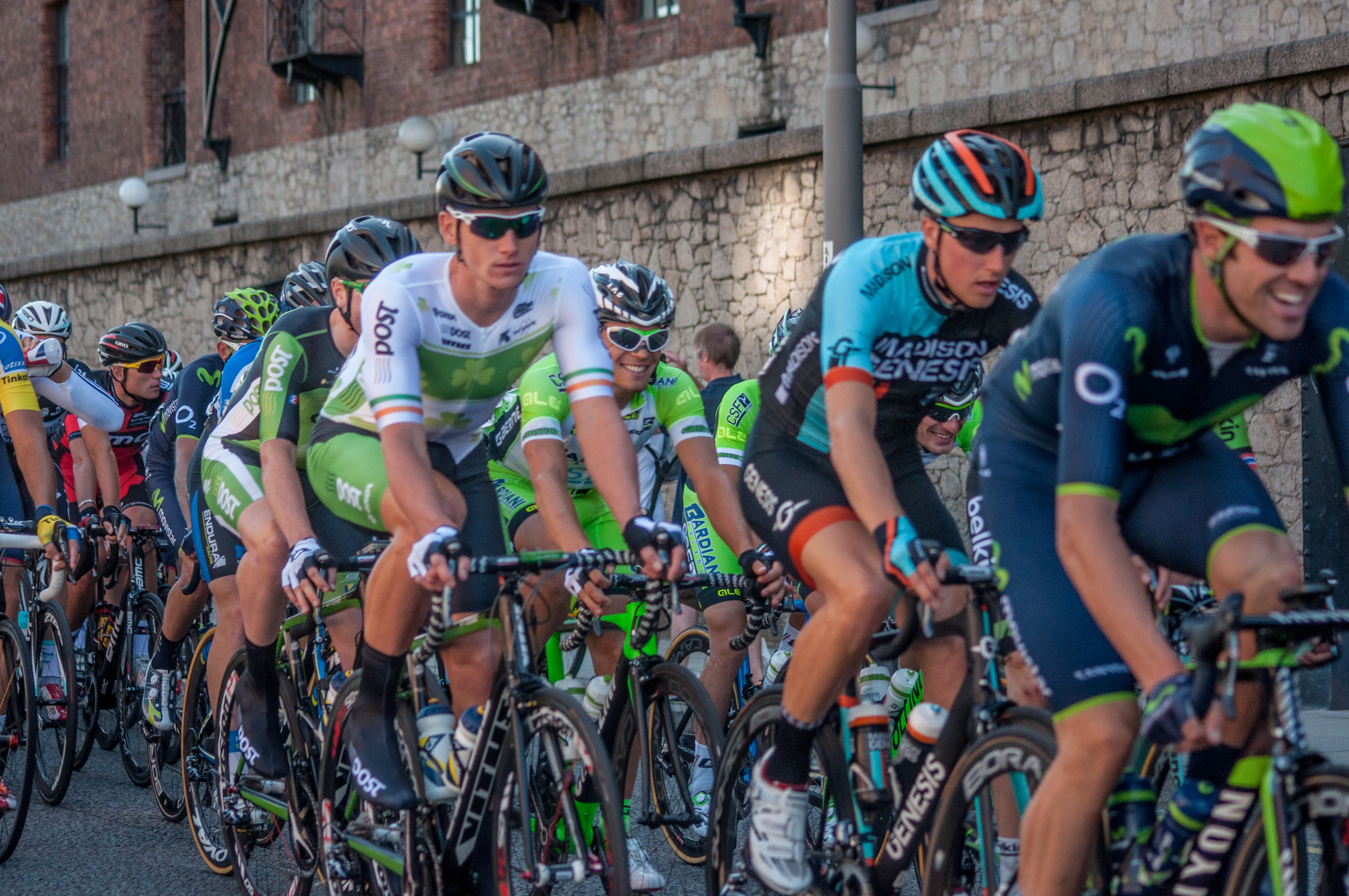
Ryan Mullen wearing the Irish national champion's jersey at the 2014 Tour of Britain

After four years of being registered in Belgium, the team returned to Irish registration in 2014. General Manager Kurt Bogaerts stated towards the end of 2013 that Belgian rules regarding the number of domestic riders were becoming an issue, and that the team would benefit from more invitations to significant races such as Tour d'Azerbaïdjan as an Irish team. He also spoke of plans to race as a professional continental team in 2015 while maintaining a development squad at continental level.

Robert-Jon McCarthy took the only UCI Tour victory of the season in team colours, winning stage one of the year's An Post Rás. He wore the leader's jersey on stage two and also led the points and youth classifications but lost over ten minutes to his rivals on the second day and dropped down the order. Irish-born McCarthy had elected to represent Australia having moved there as a teenager, and also won a stage at the 2014 Herald Sun Tour riding for the Australia U23 National Team.

Ryan Mullen took a hat-trick of wins at the Irish National Cycling Championships in his first season with the team, claiming the Elite Men's Road Race and the under-23 Road and Time Trial titles. Teammate Sean Downey finished the elite road race over a minute behind Mullen in second place, with former team rider Paidi O'Brien in third.

Future Olympic track gold medallist Owain Doull spent 2014 with the team in his first year as a professional. He won stage three and took the overall victory at Le Triptyque des Monts et Châteaux riding for the Great Britain National Team, with Tiesj Benoot and Alex Kirsch joining him on the final podium.

Shane Archbold was winless on the road but came second on stage five at the Tour of Britain and claimed the gold medal in the scratch race at the 2014 Commonwealth Games.

== 2015 season ==
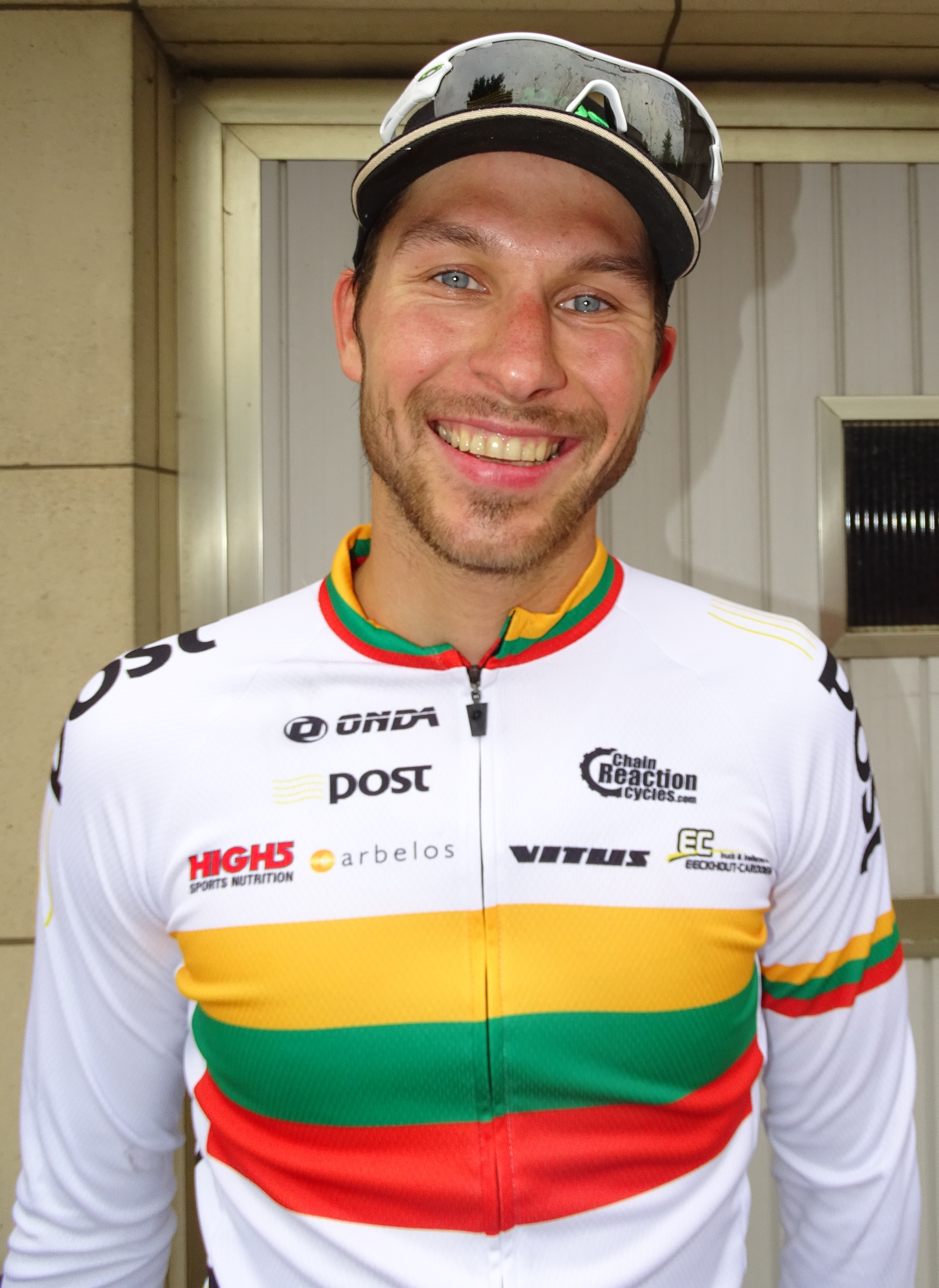
Aidis Kruopis in the Lithuania National Champion's jersey

2015 saw the team take ten wins including two national championships. Aaron Gate and Aidis Kruopis both won two stages at An Post Rás, with Gate taking the points jersey and Kruopis winning the mountains classification. Five team riders finished in the top twelve of the final standings with Josh Edmondson and Ryan Mullen placing second and third respectively behind future Giro d'Italia stage winner Lukas Pöstlberger.

Mullen completed his set of elite and under-23 Irish titles, becoming the youngest ever winner of the Irish National Championships Time Trial. Kruopis added Antwerpse Havenpijl and the Lithuanian National Championships Road Race to his palmares while Edmondson took the overall win and a stage at Ronde de l'Oise. Edmondson also won stage three of the Tour d'Azerbaïdjan and finished in sixth place overall, with Primož Roglič taking the race victory.

Mullen left the team during the season, joining Cannondale–Garmin as a stagiaire in August.

== 2016 season ==
Reigning Irish National Road Race champion Damien Shaw joined the team for 2016. Shaw would relinquish the shamrock jersey, his best results being fifth overall at An Post Rás and fifth as he attempted to defend his national championship.

Nicolas Vereecken won stage two at the Circuit des Ardennes International and Aaron Gate took a stage at An Post Rás. Gate claimed a second consecutive points competition victory and finished the Rás one place behind Shaw in an event that attracted several big names. Clemens Fankhauser took his second general classification victory at the Irish race with future UCI WorldTour riders Jai Hindley, Lucas Hamilton and Eddie Dunbar occupying the next three places.

== 2017 season ==
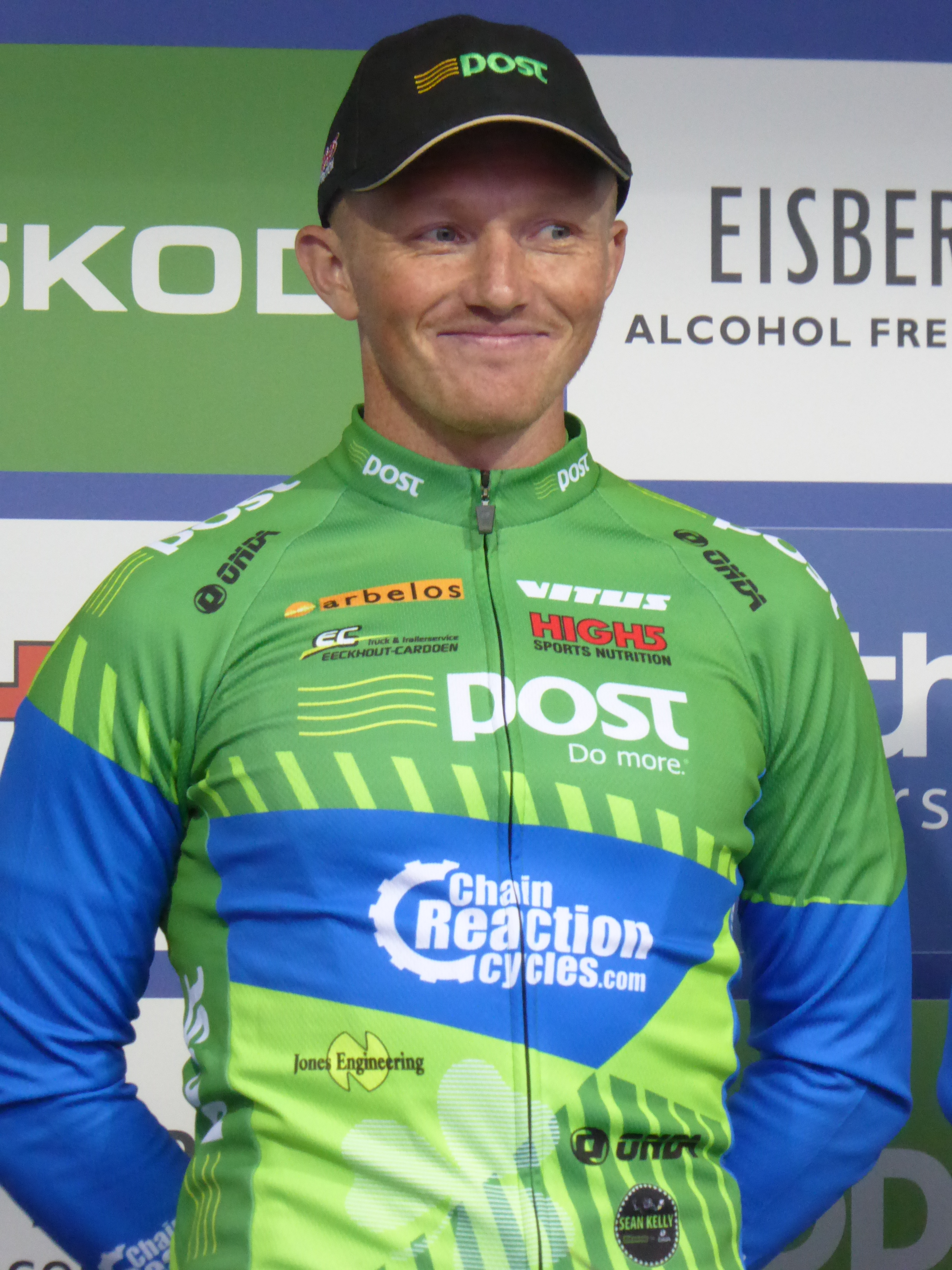
Damien Shaw

The team added a further five wins to its palmares in what would prove to be its final season. An Post announced in March 2017 that it was ending its cycling sponsorships at the end of the year, a move that would ultimately lead to the closure of the team. Team principal Sean Kelly thanked An Post for its support for the team and Irish cycling as a whole, highlighting the development of riders including Sam Bennett that had gone on to compete at the highest level of the sport.

Regan Gough started the year by winning the New Zealand National Cycling Championships under-23 time trial, and was the highest placed under-23 in the combined road race. He also won a stage later in the season at An Post Rás. Przemysław Kasperkiewicz took two wins in the season with stages at An Post Rás and Tour de Bretagne.

Damien Shaw was victorious on stage one and held the race lead for three days of the Tour du Loir et Cher. Shaw finished the race in sixth place, within a minute of winner Alexander Kamp and twelve seconds behind fourth-placed finisher and future Tour de France winner Jonas Vingegaard.

Matthew Teggart was the winner of stage three at An Post Rás. This was the only victory of his professional career, and ensured that the team's streak of winning a stage or the overall at the race extended to ten consecutive seasons. In all, the team took two overall victories and nineteen stage wins at Rás Tailteann, and only once failed to have a rider finish in the overall top-ten between 2007 and 2017.

== Overall record ==
During its twelve seasons of racing from 2006 to 2017, the team claimed eight elite general classification victories in professional stage races. All of these came on the UCI Europe Tour at events held in Ireland, France and Spain. The team also took ten one-day race victories, six elite national championship road and time trial titles - three in Ireland and three in Lithuania - and thirty-five individual stages for a total of fifty-nine professional victories. A further seven wins - two general classifications and five stages - were taken by riders temporarily representing their national teams.

The team also took five victories in under-23 national championship races, three of which were in Ireland and two in New Zealand. One additional under-23 win, the 2012 Tour of Flanders U23, was taken by Kenneth Vanbilsen while representing the Belgian national team.

Gediminas Bagdonas was the most successful rider in terms of wins, taking twelve victories for the team and a further four representing the Lithuania national team. Niko Eeckhout had the second highest number of victories with ten. 2011 was the most successful season for the team with twelve victories including three general classification wins.

All but one of the team's elite wins came in Europe, the sole exception being stage three of the 2015 Tour d'Azerbaïdjan which was won by Josh Edmondson. Azerbaijan straddles the border between Europe and Asia, with the stage being held just south of the recognised boundary between the two continents and therefore on the Asian side. Robert-Jon McCarthy also won a UCI Tour race outside Europe while contracted to the team, taking stage three of the 2014 Herald Sun Tour in Victoria, Australia riding for the Australia U23 National Team.

== Ranking performance ==
The SKT team was UCI ranked 31st out of 125 teams at the end of the 2009 UCI Europe Tour season with 481 points. The team was ranked 46th out of 110 teams on the UCI Europe Tour rankings for 2010 with 314 points. It improved ranking to 21st out of 114 teams in 2011 with 648 points, with the team's highest points scorers being Mark McNally with 125 and Andrew Fenn, who scored 122. The team had their best ever season in 2012, finishing 16th out of 125 teams in the final rankings on 879 points. Gediminas Bagdonas was the team's highest points scorer with 346 points, a tally that was good enough to put him in tenth place in the individual standings. Niko Eeckhout contributed 187 points to the tally, while Kenneth Vanbilsen scored 131. In 2013 the team finished 28th overall with a total of 341 points.

== Team roster ==
As at 31 December 2017

Rider	Date of birth
Jonas Bokeloh (GER)	16 March 1996 (aged 21)
Daniel Gardner (GBR)	6 March 1996 (aged 21)
Regan Gough (NZL)	6 October 1996 (aged 21)
Davy Gunst (NED)	30 January 1995 (aged 22)
Conor Hennebry (IRL)	16 February 1993 (aged 24)
Adam Jamieson (CAN)	12 February 1996 (aged 21)
Przemysław Kasperkiewicz (POL)	1 March 1994 (aged 23)
Sean MacKinnon (CAN)	24 November 1995 (aged 22)

Rider	Date of birth
Sean McKenna (IRL)	8 March 1994 (aged 23)
Albert Muela Galvez (ESP)	13 May 1996 (aged 21)
Jacob Scott (GBR)	14 June 1995 (aged 22)
Damien Shaw (IRL)	10 July 1984 (aged 33)
Mark Stewart (GBR)	25 August 1995 (aged 22)
Matthew Teggart (IRL)	8 January 1996 (aged 21)
Bas Tietema (NED)	29 January 1995 (aged 22)
Massimo Vanderaerden (BEL)	21 January 1995 (aged 22)

== Major wins ==
2008
Overall Vuelta a Extremadura, Daniel Lloyd

Stage 1, Team Time Trial

Overall FBD Insurance Rás, Stephen Gallagher
Overall Tour des Pyrénées, Daniel Fleeman

2009
Stages 4 & 5 Vuelta a Extremadura, Niko Eeckhout
Stage 1 FBD Insurance Rás, Niko Eeckhout
Overall Ronde de l'Oise, Steven Van Vooren
Grote Prijs Stad Zottegem, Niko Eeckhout
Memorial Rik Van Steenbergen, Niko Eeckhout

2010
Ireland Irish Road Race Championship, Matt Brammeier
Stage 5 Étoile de Bessèges, Niko Eeckhout
Stage 3 Ronde de l'Oise, Niko Eeckhout
Stage 3 FBD Insurance Rás, David O'Loughlin
Stage 7 FBD Insurance Rás, Mark Cassidy

2011
Lithuania Time Trial Championships, Gediminas Bagdonas
Stage 2 Driedaagse van West-Vlaanderen, Niko Eeckhout
Stage 7 Tour de Bretagne Cycliste, Andrew Fenn
Overall An Post Rás, Gediminas Bagdonas

Stages 2 & 4, Gediminas Bagdonas

Memorial Van Coningsloo, Andrew Fenn
Overall Ronde de l'Oise, Gediminas Bagdonas

Stage 2, Gediminas Bagdonas

GP Stad Geel, Sam Bennett
Overall Mi-Août en Bretagne, Mark McNally
Stage 7 Tour of Britain, Gediminas Bagdonas

2012
Lithuania Road Race Championships, Gediminas Bagdonas
Kattekoers, Roy Jans
Ronde van Noord-Holland, Gediminas Bagdonas
Omloop der Kempen, Niko Eeckhout
Stages 3 & 8 An Post Rás, Gediminas Bagdonas
Memorial Van Coningsloo, Gediminas Bagdonas
Schaal Sels, Niko Eeckhout

2013
Stage 5 Tour of Britain, Sam Bennett
Stage 2 An Post Rás, Shane Archbold
Stages 3 & 8 An Post Rás, Sam Bennett
Stage 2 Ronde de l'Oise, Glenn O'Shea
Ireland Under-23 Road Race Championships, Jack Wilson

2014
Stage 1 An Post Rás, Robert-Jon McCarthy
Ireland Under-23 Time Trial Championships, Ryan Mullen
Ireland Road Race Championships, Ryan Mullen
Ireland Under-23 Road Race Championships, Ryan Mullen

2015
Stage 3 Tour d'Azerbaïdjan, Josh Edmondson
Stages 2 & 5 An Post Rás, Aaron Gate
Stages 4 & 8 An Post Rás, Aidis Kruopis
Overall Ronde de l'Oise, Josh Edmondson

Stage 4, Josh Edmondson

Ireland Time Trial Championships, Ryan Mullen
Lithuania Road Race Championships, Aidis Kruopis
Antwerpse Havenpijl, Aidis Kruopis

2016
Stage 6 An Post Rás, Aaron Gate
Stage 2 Circuit des Ardennes International, Nicolas Vereecken

2017
New Zealand Under-23 Time Trial Championships, Regan Gough
New Zealand Under-23 Road Race Championships, Regan Gough
Stage 1 Tour du Loir et Cher, Damien Shaw
Stage 5 Tour de Bretagne, Przemysław Kasperkiewicz
Stage 3 An Post Rás, Matthew Teggart
Stage 5 An Post Rás, Regan Gough
Stage 8 An Post Rás, Przemysław Kasperkiewicz

== National champions ==
2010
Ireland Road Race Matt Brammeier

2011
Lithuania Time Trial Gediminas Bagdonas

2012
Lithuania Road Race Gediminas Bagdonas

2013
Ireland Under-23 Road Race Jack Wilson

2014
Ireland Under-23 Time Trial Ryan Mullen
Ireland Road Race Ryan Mullen
Ireland Under-23 Road Race Ryan Mullen

2015
Ireland Time Trial Ryan Mullen
Lithuania Road Race Aidis Kruopis

2017
New Zealand Under-23 Time Trial, Regan Gough
New Zealand Under-23 Road Race, Regan Gough
