= Wiggle (brand) =

European online sports retailer

WiggleCRC Group
- Type: Private
- Industry: Online sports retail
- Defunct: March 2024
- Headquarters: Portsmouth, England
- Area served: Worldwide
- Key people: Huw Crwys-Williams (CEO)
- Products: Triathlon equipment. Bicycles, components and accessories. Running shoes and apparel. Swimming products. Outdoor and casual sports apparel. Tools etc.
- Revenue: £400+ Million (WiggleCRC Group)
- Owner: SIGNA Sports United (NYSE: SSU)
- Number of employees: c.900 (WiggleCRC Group)

Wiggle is an online brand of the Frasers Group, having been bought after WiggleCRC went into administration with losses of £97 million.

Previously Wiggle was part of the WiggleCRC group, which included Chain Reaction Cycles, however only the brands were transferred to the new owners.

== History ==
The origins of Wiggle trace back to a local bike shop called Butlers Cycles, located in Portsmouth. Mitch Dall, a founder of Wiggle, bought the shop in 1995.

Between 1999 and 2009, Wiggle experimented with online retail, and experienced strong growth.

By 2006, Wiggle was turning over £11.8m and Livingbridge private equity took a 42% stake in the company. After a further three years of 40% growth, Livingbridge bought the remaining 58% in 2009, including Dall's remaining 26% stake.

Livingbridge brought in Humphrey Cobbold as CEO in December 2009. By 2011, projected annual revenue was £118m following strong international growth helped by a weak pound.

In 2011, Livingbridge considered taking the company public in an initial public offering, with the company's overall value estimated at £200m, and pre-tax profits having risen from £7.1m to £10.2m in the year to January 2011, following a 123 percent increase in international sales.

After an auction in December 2011, Wiggle was acquired by venture capitalists Bridgepoint Capital for £180m. Wiggle was now one of 6 European online sports retailers, and no 2 in the UK to Chain Reaction Cycles.

In September 2013, after the sale of the business, Cobbold stepped down and Stefan Barden (former CEO of Northern Foods) took over.

In 2015, Andy Bond stepped down and Brian McBride joined as chairman. McBride was formerly the CEO of Amazon UK and is the chairman of the online fashion clothing retailer ASOS.

== WiggleCRC ==
The merger of Wiggle and Chain Reaction Cycles was announced in 2016: by this time No1 and No2 largest global online players in the cycle and tri sports product categories.

In late 2016, Stefan Barden was replaced by Will Kernan as the new Group CEO - Kernan was previously the CEO of The White Company, and before that MD and COO at New Look. In January 2019, it was stated that Kernan was to be replaced by Ross Clemmow, a former Debenhams director.

The WiggleCRC Group formed after the Competition Commission approved the merger and Wiggle bought 100% of the Chain Reactions Cycle equity from the Watson family for £62m. A key driver of synergies was the closure of CRC's Northern Irish warehouse and distribution infrastructure whose volume was integrated into Citadel in Wolverhampton; this process was concluded in December 2017.

The Wiggle and Chain Reaction Cycles brands remain distinct, with their own websites. Proforma turnover was over £360m in 2017 and Wiggle was the largest pure-play online sports retailer in Europe.

In October 2017 it was announced that WiggleCRC had bought a German competitor and market no. 2, Bike 24, for a reported £100m, giving access to German suppliers and a potential 'Brexit hedge'.

In 2018, a Chain Reaction Cycles' employee was critical of the group's actions after the merger; citing continued redundancies, shift patterns and a perceived shift of operations away from Ireland to Wolverhampton.

On 27 October 2023 a notice was published to The Gazette announcing an administrator for the Wiggle Limited business following a period where the parent company's key financial backer pulled the plug on financing. This eventually resulted in most of the staff being laid off in February 2024, and in March 2024 the brands started to operate as part of the Frasers Group alongside Evans Cycles.
