= Denis Cioban =

Moldovan road bicycle racer (born 1985)

Personal information
- Full name: Denis Cioban
- Born: 27 June 1985 (age 41) Chişinău, Moldova

Cycling career
- Sport: Cycling
- Discipline: Road/Track
- Role: Rider

Denis Cioban (born 27 June 1985 in Chişinău) is a former Moldovan road bicycle racer.

== Palmares ==
2006
3rd in Prix de la Mi-Août

1st in Stage 3, Cupa Autoconstruct
3rd in Stage 4, Cupa Autoconstruct
3rd in Cupa Autoconstruct
2nd in Prologue, GP Tell
