= Chain Reaction Cycles =

English online sporting goods retailer

Wiggle-CRC Group
- Company type: Private
- Industry: Online sports retail
- Headquarters: Portsmouth, England, UK
- Area served: Worldwide
- Key people: Will Kernan (CEO), Brian McBride (chairman)
- Products: Triathlon equipment; bicycles, components and accessories; running shoes and apparel; swimming products; outdoor and casual sports apparel; tools
- Owner: Bridgepoint Advisors
- Website: chainreactioncycles.com

Chain Reaction Cycles is an English online retailer of sports gear and equipment. It is the online brand of the Frasers Group, having been bought after WiggleCRC went into administration with losses of £97 million.

Previously it was an online retailer of cycling products based in Belfast, Northern Ireland. A 2016 merger with Wiggle Ltd resulted in the formation of the WiggleCRC Group, whose head office was in Portsmouth, England. WiggleCRC entered administration in October 2023, and only the brands were transferred to the new owners.

== History ==
Chain Reaction Cycles started out as a small bike shop named Ballynure Cycles which was opened in 1985 by George and Janice Watson using a £1500 bank loan in the small village of Ballynure in Northern Ireland.

In late 1999, the company registered domain name www.ChainReactionCycles.com and launched the Chain Reaction Cycles website.

The sales grew each year. In 2011 revenues were £136.4 million (€170 million). Its peak sales were in 2013, at £155.6 million. By this time the website was providing multi lingual service and currency options for many countries.

In 2013, the company became the co-sponsor of An Post–Chain Reaction, an Irish-Belgian professional cycling team established in 2006 by 1988 Vuelta a España winner Sean Kelly. The arrangement lasted until the team folded at the end of the 2017 season. The team mainly competed on the UCI Europe Tour and took wins at races including the Tour of Britain, Rás Tailteann and the Tour d'Azerbaïdjan while sponsored by Chain Reaction. Ryan Mullen won two Irish National Cycling Championships as an An Post–Chain Reaction rider, winning the road race in 2014 and the time trial in 2015.

By 2015, sales had decreased to £136 million, with shares mainly going to Wiggle, a UK competitor. The company also required investment.

A merger between Wiggle and Chain Reaction Cycles was announced in February 2016.

Chain Reaction Cycles also retain a bricks & mortar retail store on Boucher Road, Belfast. The store sells a selection of their stock, and has a workshop for cycle maintenance.

CRC makes a small number of its own components and one complete bicycle under its own brand name, "Brand X".

=== Wiggle merger ===
After the Competition Commission approved the merger in July 2016 and Wiggle bought 100% of the Chain Reactions Cycle equity from the Watson family, the Wiggle CRC group was formed.

CRC closed their Northern Irish warehouse to integrate their stock into Wiggle's 'Citadel', but retains its own branding and website. The combined Wiggle CRC group generated an annual revenue of over £300 million.

In October 2017 Wiggle CRC bought German company Bike24 for over £100 million, which continues to operate separately. The group's combined revenue is now estimated at £500 million.

On 27 October 2023, a notice was published to The Gazette announcing an administrator for the Wiggle Limited business following a period where the parent company's key financial backer pulled the plug on financing. This eventually resulted in most of the staff being laid off in February 2024, and in March 2024 the brands started to operate as part of the Frasers Group alongside Evans Cycles.
