= Mark Cassidy =

Irish racing cyclist

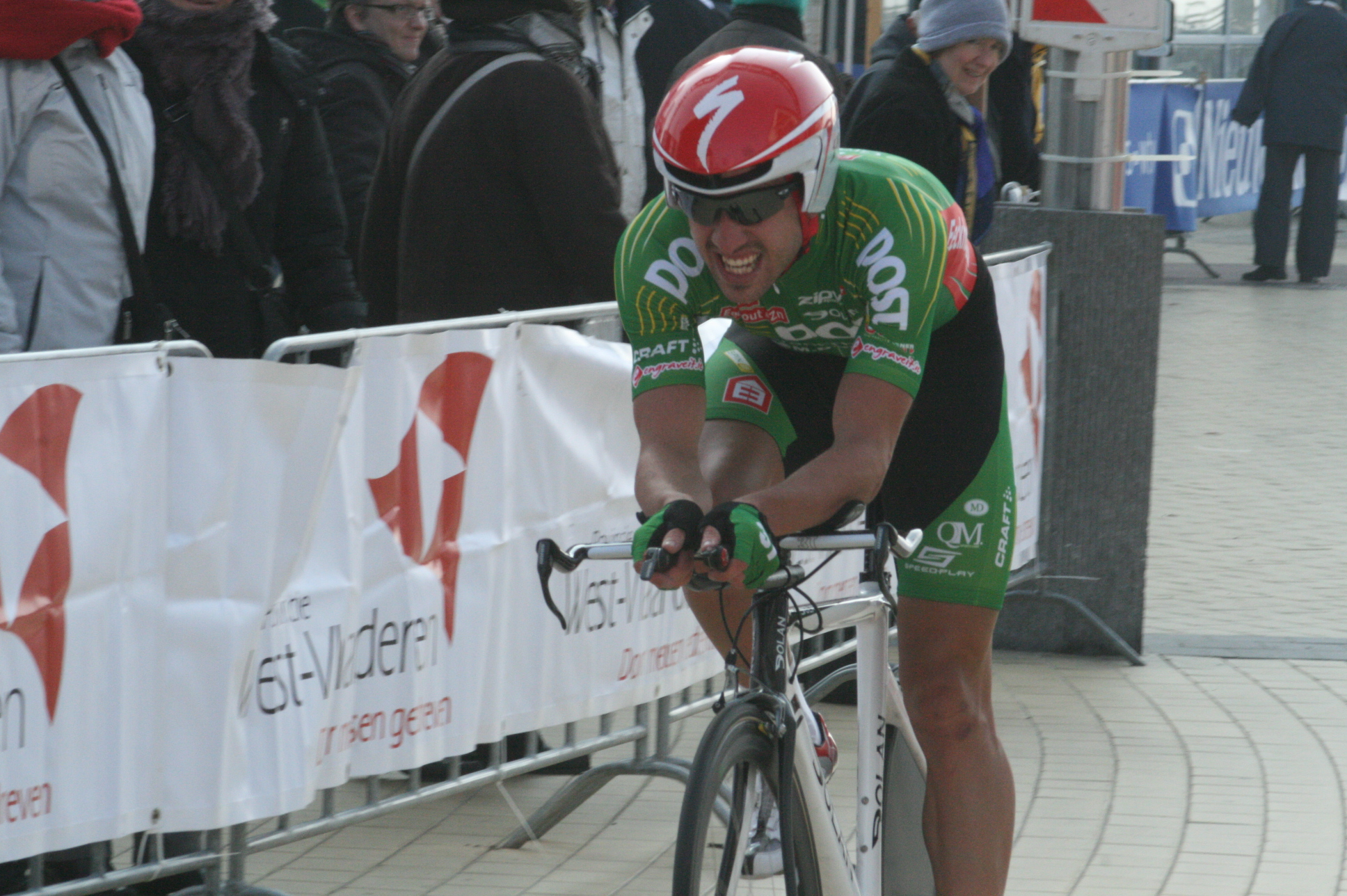

Personal information
- Full name: Mark Cassidy
- Born: March 23, 1985 (age 41) Dunboyne, County Meath, Ireland

Cycling career
- Sport: Cycling
- Discipline: Road
- Role: Rider

Professional teams
- 2005: Driving Force Logistics
- 2006–2012: Sean Kelly ACLVB–M.Donnelly

Mark Cassidy (born 23 March 1985) is a former Irish professional cyclist who rode for the An Post–Chain Reaction team.

== Major results ==
2011 – An Post–Sean Kelly

- 10th, Irish National Road Race Championship (CN)
- 40th overall, An Post Rás (2.2)
  - 15th, Stage 2
- 79th overall, Tour of Oman (2.1)

2010 – An Post–Sean Kelly

- 3rd, Halfords Tour Series Dublin criterium
- 5th, Mere
- 6th overall, Suir Valley 3 Day
  - 1st, KOM class
  - 4th, Stage 1
- 20th, Beverbeek Classic (1.2)
- 28th, Rund um Köln (1.1)
- 42nd, Scheldeprijs (1.HC)
- 46th overall, FBD Insurance Ras (2.2)
  - 1st, Stage 7
  - 1st, Mountains class
  - 4th, Stage 5
  - 33rd, Stage 8

2009 – An Post–M.Donnelly–Grant Thornton–Sean Kelly

- 5th, Memorial Fred De Bruyne – Berlare
- 5th, Memorial Briek Schotte – Desselgem
- 13th, Irish National Road Race Championship (CN)
- 16th, Stage 5, Sachsen Tour (2.1)
- 99th overall, FBD Insurance Ras (2.2)
  - 12th, Stage 8

2008 – An Post–M.Donnelly–Grant Thornton–Sean Kelly

- 34th overall, Tour of Ireland (2.1)

2007 – Murphy & Gunn–Newlyn–M.Donnelly–Sean Kelly

- 1st, Irish National U23 Road Race Championship (CN)
- 2nd, Grand Prix de Dourges-Hénin-Beaumont (1.2)
- 3rd, Irish National Road Race Championship (CN)
- 3rd, Stage 6, FBD Insurance Ras (2.2)

2006

- 3rd, Irish National U23 Road Race Championship (CN)
- 9th, Irish National Road Race Championship (CN)

2004

- 10th, Irish National Road Race Championship (CN)
