= List of British cyclists =

== A ==
- Adrian Adgar
- Dave Akam
- Caroline Alexander
- Eddie Alexander
- Ian Alsop
- Katie Archibald
- Lizzie Armitstead
- Dan Atherton
- Gee Atherton
- Rachel Atherton
- George Atkins
- Brenda Atkinson

== B ==
- David Baker (cyclo)
- David Baker (track)
- Ian Banbury
- Lizzy Banks
- Alan Bannister
- Charley Barden
- Cyril Bardsley
- Elinor Barker
- Megan Barker
- Yanto Barker
- Alice Barnes
- Hannah Barnes
- Nick Barnes
- Reg Barnett
- Ella Barnwell
- Sid Barras
- Tom Barras
- Mark Barry
- Charles Henry Bartlett
- Karl Barton
- Lauren Bate
- Edward Battell
- Phil Bayton
- Scott Beaumont
- Oli Beckinsale
- Dave Bedwell
- Lauren Bell
- Mark Bell
- Jonathan Bellis
- Michael Bennett
- Steve Bent
- Frederick Thomas Bidlake
- Lloyd Binch
- Janet Birkmyre
- Laura Bissell
- Peter Bissell
- Maria Blower
- Anna Blyth
- Adam Blythe
- Chris Boardman
- John Gavin Bone
- Fred Booker
- Ray Booty
- Peter Boyd
- Sally Boyden
- Reg Braddick
- Bill Bradley
- Lisa Brambani
- Matt Brammeier
- Mark Bristow
- Stan Brittain
- Rhys Britton
- Peter Brotherton
- Josh Bryceland
- Stewart Brydon
- Trevor Bull
- Donald Burgess
- Steven Burke
- Bruce Bursford
- Beryl Burton
- Denise Burton
- Germain Burton
- Maurice Burton
- Keith Butler
- Jon-Allan Butterworth

== C ==
- Hugh Cameron
- Ian Cammish
- Craig Campbell
- Ernest J. Capell
- Sophie Capewell
- Paul Carbutt
- Jack Carlin
- Manon Carpenter
- Hugh Carthy
- Cyril Cartwright
- Mark Cavendish
- Ernest Chambers
- Stanley Chambers
- Anna Christian
- Mark Christian
- Ed Clancy
- Jon Clay
- Ernie Clements
- Ron Coe
- Mark Colbourne
- Katie Colclough
- Gary Coltman
- Jenny Copnall
- Craig Cooke
- Geoff Cooke (cyclist)
- Nicole Cooke
- Simon Cope
- Phil Corley
- Kadeena Cox
- Sydney Cozens
- Nick Craig
- Jessica Crampton
- Matthew Crampton
- Bruce Croall
- Robin Croker
- Roy Cromack
- Steve Cronshaw
- Ernie Crutchlow
- Kate Cullen
- Steve Cummings
- Jody Cundy
- Paul Curran
- Katie Curtis

== D ==
- Stuart Dangerfield
- David Daniell
- Karen Darke
- Ann Davey
- Charlie Davey
- Emma Davies
- Sally Dawes
- Lizzie Deignan
- Vin Denson
- Abigail Dentus
- Josie Dew
- Anna Docherty
- Owain Doull
- Dean Downing
- Russell Downing
- Bob Downs
- Alex Dowsett
- Tony Doyle
- Adam Duggleby

== E ==
- Harry Earnshaw
- Ray Eden
- Ross Edgar
- Josh Edmondson
- Phil Edwards
- Malcolm Elliott
- Kian Emadi
- Alf Engers
- Neah Evans
- Rik Evans
- Wendy Everson

== F ==
- Neil Fachie
- Andrew Fenn
- Paul Fennell
- Sid Ferris
- Dan Fleeman
- David Fletcher
- Brian Fleming
- Billie Fleming
- Des Fretwell
- Chris Froome

== G ==
- Trevor Gadd
- Mike Gambrill
- Grace Garner
- Lucy Garner
- John Geddes
- Alan Geldard
- Tao Geoghegan Hart
- Harry Genders
- Tony Gibb
- Tommy Godwin (1912)
- Tommy Godwin (1920)
- Maggie Gordon-Smith
- Lydia Gould
- Tim Gould
- Tony Gowland
- Harry Grant
- Eileen Gray
- Walter Greaves
- Alex Greenfield
- Ben Greenwood
- Phil Griffiths
- Freddie Grubb
- James Gullen

== H ==
- Corrine Hall
- Ian Hallam
- Roger Hammond
- William Hammond
- Denise Hampson
- David Handley
- Charles D. Harman
- Nikki Harris
- Reg Harris
- Bert Harris
- Derek Harrison
- Sam Harrison
- William Harvell
- Danny Hart
- Rob Hayles
- Hamish Haynes
- Matthew Haynes
- Ethan Hayter
- Rachel Heal
- Steve Heffernan
- Charles Helps
- Simeon Hempsall
- Cyril Heppleston
- John Herety
- Tony Hewson
- Gary Hibbert
- Tony Hibbert
- Ernest Higgins
- Amy Hill
- Harry Hill
- Philip Hindes
- Bert Hitchen
- Barry Hoban
- Sally Hodge
- Jenny Holl
- Charles Holland
- Dale Holmes
- Joe Holt
- Cyril Horn
- Dennis Horn
- Ciara Horne
- Kristian House
- Wendy Houvenaghel
- Chris Hoy
- Megan Hughes
- Arthur Humbles
- Jeremy Hunt
- Joshua Hunt
- Angela Hunter
- Ellen Hunter
- Michael Hutchinson

== I ==
- Matt Illingworth
- Les Ingman
- Joby Ingram-Dodd

== J ==
- Harry Jackson
- Peter Jacques
- Becky James
- Rachel James
- Tony James
- Rob Jefferies
- Paul Jennings
- Ernest Johnson
- Maxine Johnson
- Thomas Johnson
- Victor Johnson
- Charline Joiner
- Benjamin Jones
- Emma Jones
- Graham Jones
- Hayley Jones
- Louise Jones
- Mandy Jones
- Ray Jones
- Steve Joughin

== K ==
- Anthony Kappes
- Emily Kay
- Ronald Keeble
- John Keen
- Frederick Keeping
- Peter Kennaugh
- Tim Kennaugh
- Darren Kenny
- Jason Kenny
- Laura Kenny
- Dannielle Khan
- Liam Killeen
- Charles King
- Dani King
- Clarence Kingsbury
- Zeb Kyffin

== L ==
- Thomas Lance
- Paul Lasenby
- Annie Last
- Christopher Latham
- Jack Lauterwasser
- Maria Lawrence
- Chris Lawless
- Sharon Laws
- Dave Le Grys
- Colin Lewis
- Marco Librizzi
- Phil Liggett
- Dennis Lightfoot
- Simon Lillistone
- Chris Lillywhite
- Arthur Linton
- Daniel Lloyd
- Dave Lloyd
- Manon Lloyd
- Harry Lodge
- Mark Lovatt
- Christian Lyte

== M ==
- Bob Maitland
- Anthony Malarczyk
- Paul Manning
- Greg Mansell
- Katy Marchant
- Lucy Martin
- Tony Mayer
- Hannah Mayho
- Craig MacLean
- James McCallum
- Charlie McCoy
- Ruth McGavigan
- Aileen McGlynn
- Yvonne McGregor
- Paul McHugh
- Donald McKellow
- Shaun McKeown
- Daniel McLay
- Joey McLoughlin
- Alwyn McMath
- Mark McNally
- Paul Medhurst
- Leonard Meredith
- Arthur Metcalfe
- Jimmy Michael
- John Middleton
- Stanley Miles
- David Millar
- Robert Millar
- Dave Miller
- John Miller
- Ruby Miller
- Ernie Mills
- Glen Mitchell
- Peter Mitchell
- James Moore
- Willi Moore
- Oliver Moors
- Rachel Morris
- Charles Moss
- Jon Mould
- Paula Moseley
- Tracy Moseley
- Faith Murray
- Stephen Murray
- Rob Muzio

== N ==
- Emily Nelson
- George Newberry
- Frances Newstead
- Alan Newton
- Chris Newton
- Dave Nie
- Jon Norfolk

== O ==
- Graeme Obree
- Evan Oliphant
- Lewis Oliva
- James Ouchterlony
- Ryan Owens

== P ==
- Kieran Page
- Rob Partridge
- Bill Paul
- Julie Paulding
- Steve Paulding
- Ernest Payne
- Hannah Payton
- Steve Peat
- Cyril Peacock
- Craig Percival
- William Perrett
- Liam Phillips
- Sarah Phillips
- Victoria Pendleton
- Alison Pockett
- Dick Poole
- Emma Pooley
- Hugh Porter
- Huw Pritchard
- Peter Procter
- Jack Pullar

== Q ==
- Jason Queally

== R ==
- Jacob Ragan
- Dave Rand
- Dave Rayner
- Shanaze Reade
- Hannah Rich
- Evie Richards
- Simon Richardson (English cyclist)
- Simon Richardson
- David Ricketts
- Amy Roberts
- Jessica Roberts
- Brian Robinson
- Desmond Robinson
- Eileen Roe
- Rebecca Romero
- Matt Rotherham
- Dave Rowe
- Luke Rowe
- Matthew Rowe
- Guy Rowland
- Erick Rowsell
- Joanna Rowsell
- Val Rushworth
- Harry Ryan

== S ==
- Gary Sadler
- Ross Sander
- Liz Scalia
- Max Sciandri
- Helen Scott
- Ian Scott
- Anna Shackley
- Robin Sharman
- James Shaw
- Julia Shaw
- Norman Sheil
- Eileen Sheridan
- Paul Sherwen
- John Sibbit
- Tom Simpson
- Don Skene
- Callum Skinner
- Andy Slater
- Brian Smith
- Jeff Snodin
- Frank Southall
- Monty Southall
- Tom Southam
- Jamie Staff
- George Herbert Stancer
- Ian Stannard
- Bryan Steel
- Ian Steel
- Matthew Stephens
- David Stevenson
- Mark Stewart
- David Stone
- Ronald Stretton
- Anthony Stirrat
- Barney Storey
- Sarah Storey
- Colin Sturgess
- Ben Swift
- Bernadette Swinnerton
- Catherine Swinnerton
- Paul Swinnerton
- Glen Sword
- Sara Symington
- Melanie Szubrycht

== T ==
- Charlie Tanfield
- Harry Tanfield
- John Tanner
- Bryan Taylor
- James Taylor
- Andy Tennant
- Geraint Thomas
- Gordon Thomas
- Eric Thompson
- Robert Thompson
- Andy Tennant
- Jonathan Tiernan-Locke
- Adrian Timmis
- Terrence Tinsley
- Jane Tomlinson
- Neville Tong
- Emma Trott
- Joseph Truman
- John Tudor
- Hamish Turnbull

== V ==
- Jessica Varnish
- Graham Vines

== W ==
- Chris Walker
- Jessie Walker
- Shaun Wallace
- Matthew Walls
- Jon Walshaw
- Michelle Ward
- Rob Warner
- Jerry Waters
- Wilfred Waters
- Dave Watkins
- Paul Watson
- Joe Waugh
- Graham Webb
- Ken Webb
- Lorna Webb
- Darryl Webster
- Les West
- Jayne Westbury
- Charlie Wegelius
- Roger Whitfield
- Geoff Wiles
- Bradley Wiggins
- Ian Wilkinson
- Alan Williams
- Jeff Williams
- Russell Williams
- Victoria Williamson
- Arthur James Wilson
- Drew Wilson
- John Wilson
- Leslie Wilson
- Marguerite Wilson
- Spencer Wingrave
- Julian Winn
- Rebecca Womersley
- Oliver Wood
- John Woodburn
- Fred Wright
- Michael Wright
- Harry Wyld
- Lew Wyld
- Percy Wyld
- Helen Wyman

== Y ==
- Adam Yates
- Sean Yates
- Simon Yates

== See also ==
- List of British cyclists who have led the Tour de France general classification
- List of Dutch cyclists
