= Cycling at the 2006 Commonwealth Games – Men's cross-country =

The men's cross country mountain biking competition at the 2006 Commonwealth Games took place on 23 March at Lysterfield Park.

== Result ==
Rank	Rider	Time
1st place, gold medalist(s)	Liam Killeen (ENG)	2:13:11
2nd place, silver medalist(s)	Oli Beckingsale (ENG)	2:13:26
3rd place, bronze medalist(s)	Seamus McGrath (CAN)	2:13:43
4	Chris Jongewaard (AUS)	2:15:08
5	Kashi Leuchs (NZL)	2:15:29
6	Sid Taberlay (AUS)	2:17:18
7	Joshua Fleming (AUS)	2:20:14
8	Mike Northcott (NZL)	2:21:11
9	Mannie Heymans (NAM)	2:21:32
10	Burry Willie Stander (RSA)	2:21:59
11	Geoff Kabush (CAN)	2:23:44
12	Simon Richardson (ENG)	2:23:44
13	Gareth Montgomerie (SCO)	2:24:53
14	Marc Bassingthwaighte (NAM)	2:26:33
15	Steven Roach (WAL)	2:27:13
16	Clinton Avery (NZL)	2:27:30
17	Ermin van Wyk (NAM)	2:28:56
18	James Ouchterlony (SCO)	2:29:52
19	Lewis Ferguson (NIR)	2:30:46
20	Andrew Roche (IOM)	LAP
21	Azwimangadzi Jus. Makhale (RSA)	LAP
22	David Kinjah (KEN)	LAP
23	Robert James Smart (GUE)	LAP
24	Christopher Clive Froome (KEN)	LAP
25	Davidson Kamau Kihagi (KEN)	LAP
26	Cedric Passe (MRI)	LAP
	Robert Wardell (SCO)	DNF
	David Matovu Kigongo (UGA)	DNF
	David Magezi (UGA)	DNF
