= Hope Technology =

English bicycle component manufacturer

Hope Technology (IPCO) Ltd
- Trade name: Hope
- Formerly: IPCO
- Industry: Manufacturing
- Founded: 1985
- Founder: Ian Weatherill and Simon Sharp
- Headquarters: Barnoldswick, Lancashire, England
- Products: Bicycle Parts
- Number of employees: 160
- Website: www.hopetech.com

Hope Technology (since 1991, formally IPCO) is a bicycle component manufacturer based in Barnoldswick, Lancashire. Primarily concerned with manufacturing high-quality mountain bike componentry, Hope have branched into accessories such as lights, tools and riding gear.

Hope have more recently partnered with Lotus Engineering to developed a track bike, known as 'HB.T' used by Great Britain Cycling Team at the 2020 Tokyo Olympics.

== History ==
=== IPCO 1985–1991 ===
The company, known as IPCO, was started in 1985 by Ian Weatherill and Simon Sharp, former Rolls-Royce aerospace engineers, as a sub-contract manufacturer of fixings and toolings for aerospace companies in the local area. The company operated out of a (1,500 sq ft) factory in Nelson, Lancashire. In 1989 the owners decided that the brakes on their newly discovered mountain bikes were not up to scratch when compared to the motorbikes they were used to riding. They began to develop an alternative to the cantilever brakes which was common on mountain bikes at the time. They designed a calliper brake that they fitted to the front wheel of the bike. The calipers were cable operated and used a rear, screw-on hub in the front wheel of the bike. The disc rotor screwed onto the hub. IPCO began to refine the design and manufacture more of their new brake for personal use for the next 2 years. In 1990 the company had expanded to outgrow their current factory and a new factory of Skelton St, Colne, Lancashire (11,000 sq ft), nicknamed the 'Hope Shed'.

=== Hope Technology 1991–1999 ===
Ian and Simon had initially planned to use the brakes for personal use, but after 2 years they realised the potential and brought the product to market. IPCO rebranded to Hope Technology and the mechanical disc brake was the first of its kind to be sold on the market in 1991. The year also saw Hope make its first 6 bolt disc, a similar standard to that is still used today. The hubs resembled those used on trials motorbikes hubs fitted with sealed cartridge bearings.

In 1992, Hope attended their first international bike show, Interbike, Anaheim, USA. Thanks to the success of the show, a satellite office located in California was set up to help with US sales. A big investment was made to the purchase Hope's first CNC machine to ramp up production. Hope also launched its second product, the Ti-glide rear hub, one of the first Shimano compatible, aftermarket hubs. It was mainly constructed out of Titanium, was compatible with Hope's brakes and was well known for the making a loud ratcheting noise when free-wheeling. Throughout the year, and into 1993 Hope began to manufacture a number of accessories to accompany its product, including quick release skewers.

In 1994 and 1995 Hope launched a hydraulic brake system at Eurobike with a concept twin disc system, although only a single sided version was available to the public. The new braking system saw its first win for Rob Warner at the 1996 Grundig World Cup DH in Kaprun in Austria. Thank to this success, as well as good results in other races, Hope expanded its facilities to Skipton Road, Barnoldswick (39,000 sq ft) in 1998.

=== Hope Technology 2000–present ===
In the early 2000s Hope continued to expand its product range, including Bottom Brackets and Headsets. In 2004 Hope won, University of Central Lancashire Award for Best Use of Design and Innovation. In 2008 the Hope factory is moved into bigger premises to Fernbank Mill, Barnoldswick (56,000 sq ft). In 2012 Hope moved into the current factory nicknamed "Hope Mill" at Calf Hall Lane in Barnoldswick (89,000 sq ft) with 55 CNC machines. In 2019, one of Hope's founders Ian Weatherill was made an MBE in the Queen's 2019 Birthday Honours list.

== Special projects ==
=== HB.T ===
In collaboration with Lotus Engineering and British Cycling, Hope develop a track bike the HB.T The design make use of a loop hole in the UCI Regulations for track bikes. The loophole allows the bikes frame to act as a splitter plate and used to control the airflow around the riders legs. Internal "estimations suggest it's around 2-3% faster than previous track racing bikes". The structure of the bike is formed from moulded carbon-fiber that is bonded into 3D printed titanium joins. Hope also developed a way to build custom disc wheels for the bike using a monocoque structure, resulting in them weighing less than 700g. The bike cost over £15,000 to produce. In late 2021, Dutch bike brand Kú Cycle claimed the bike infringed their 2016 patent.

==== HB.TT ====
Hope customised one of the HB.T for use in road time trials. This saw the addition of Hope disc brakes, and a Shimano Di2 groupset. The bike was used by Ethan Vernon in the UCI World Championships.

=== Guy Martin speed record bike ===
Guy Martin attempted and gained the British record for outright speed on bicycle. With the help of slipstreaming he reached 112 mph. Hope developed a special drivetrain for the custom built bike. Hope supplied bottom brackets, custom cranks, and two chainrings with 60 teeth. The rear wheel turned 15 times for every pedal revolution.

=== Short films ===
==== Inspired - 2009 ====
Hope supported Danny MacAskill released the short film 'Inspired' in April 2009. Filmed in and around Edinburgh by his flat mate, the edit shows Danny riding his trials bike performing stunts around the city centre, and now has over 39.7 million views on YouTube.

==== Road Bike Party - 2013 ====
Hope supported Martyn Ashton in the production of 'Road Bike Party' in 2012. Martyn showed off his skills on a bike, performing tricks on a road bike. A sequel, 'Road Bike Party 2' was produced in 2013. They have a combined viewership of over 34 million views
