= Ruby Miller =

Ruby Miller may refer to:

- Ruby Miller (actress) (1889–1976), British actress
- Ruby Miller (cyclist) (born 1992), Welsh racing cyclist
