= British National Mountain Biking Championships =

British cycling championship competition started in 2078

The British Mountain Biking National Championships are organized by British Cycling, and the winner has the right to wear the national champion's jersey for the following year. The races are only open to riders of British nationality.

== Venues ==
Year	Venue			
1998		Builth Wells, Wales (DH)		
1999	Eastridge, Shropshire, England (DH & Duel)			
2000	Innerleithen, Borders, Scotland (DH & Duel)			
2001		Ludlow		
2002		Ludlow		
2003	Bringewood, Ludlow			
2004	Fort William, Scotland			
2005	Bringewood (XC & DH)		Leamington Spa (4X)	
2006	Moelfre Hall, Powys, Wales			
2007	Newnham Park (XC)	Rheola Forest (DH)		
2008	Ringwood (XC)		Bridgnorth (4X)	Margam Park (Marathon)
2011	Aske (XC)	Llangollen (DH)		
2012		Ballaugh Plantation (DH)	Harthill (4X)	
2013	Cathkin Braes Country Park (XC)	Rhyd-Y-Felin (DH)	The Edge Adventure Centre (4X)	Selkirk Rugby (Marathon)
2014	Hopton Woods (XC)	Innerleithen (DH)	Falmouth (4X)	Selkirk Rugby (Marathon)
2015	Hadleigh Park (XC)	Llangollen (DH)	Moelfre Hall (4X)	Selkirk Rugby (Marathon)
2016	Cathkin Braes Country Park (XC)	Revolution Bike Park (DH)	Farmer Jac's (4X)	Llandovery (Marathon)
2017	Cannock Chase (XC)	Rhyd-Y-Felin (DH)	Moelfre Hall (4X)	Isle of Man (Marathon)
2018	Hadleigh Park (XC)	Glencoe (DH)	Falmouth (4X)	Isle of Man (Marathon)
2019	Cannock Chase (XC)	Revolution Bike Park (DH)	Port Talbot (4X)	Isle of Man (Marathon)
2020	Cancelled due to COVID-19 pandemic			
2021	Newnham Park (XC)	Rhyd-Y-Felin (DH)	Port Talbot (4X)	Kielder Forest (Marathon)
2022	Kirroughtree Forest (XC)	Glencoe (DH)		Kielder Forest (Marathon)

== Results ==
=== Cross Country ===
==== Men ====
Senior	1st	2nd	3rd
1991	Tim Gould		
1992	David Baker		
1993	David Baker		
1994	David Baker		
1995	Barrie Clarke	Nick Craig	Tim Gould
1996	Barrie Clarke	David Baker	Tim Gould
1997	Nick Craig		
1998	Barrie Clarke	Nick Craig	
1999	Paul Lasenby	Oli Beckingsale	Nick Craig
2000	Nick Craig	Carl Sturgeon	Barrie Clarke
2001	Oli Beckingsale	Barrie Clarke	Carl Sturgeon
2002	Oli Beckingsale	Barrie Clarke	Nick Craig
2003	Nick Craig	Barrie Clarke	Andrew Sinnott
2004	Jody Crawforth	William Jones	Oli Beckingsale
2005	Oli Beckingsale	Andrew Sinnott	James Ouchterlony
2006	Oli Beckingsale	Phil Spencer	Nick Craig
2007	Oli Beckingsale	Ian Wilkinson	Nick Craig
2008	Liam Killeen	Oli Beckingsale	Ian Wilkinson
2009	Liam Killeen	Oli Beckingsale	Lee Williams
2010	Liam Killeen	Oli Beckingsale	Paul Oldham
2011	Liam Killeen	Oli Beckingsale	Lee Williams
2012	Liam Killeen	David Fletcher	Oli Beckingsale
2013	Grant Ferguson	Oli Beckingsale	David Fletcher
2014	Grant Ferguson	Liam Killeen	Paul Oldham
2015	Grant Ferguson	Phillip Pearce	David Fletcher
2016	Grant Ferguson	David Fletcher	Liam Killeen
2017	Grant Ferguson	Phillip Pearce	Ian Field
2018	Grant Ferguson	Tom Bell	Jason Bouttell
2019	Frazer Clacherty	Grant Ferguson	Jason Bouttell
2020	Cancelled due to COVID-19 pandemic		
2021	Frazer Clacherty	Cameron Orr	Christopher Rothwell
2022	Cameron Orr	Thomas Mein	Isaac Mundy

Espoir	1st	2nd	3rd
1999			
2000	Ian Wilkinson	Elliot Baxter	Tim Morley
2001			
2002	Liam Killeen	Steve Farmer	Simon Richardson
2003	Liam Killeen	Philip Spencer	Steven Roach
2004	Liam Killeen	Philip Spencer	Steven Roach
2005	Simon Richardson	Ian Bibby	Ian Field
2006	Ian Field	Steven Roach	Ian Bibby
2007	Ian Bibby	Ross Creber	Mark Thwaites
2008	David Fletcher	Ian Field	Billy Joe Whenman
2009	Scott Thwaites	David Fletcher	Anthony O'Boyle
2010	David Fletcher	Ben Thomas	John Pybus
2011	Kenta Gallagher	Billy-Joe Whenman	Steven James
2012	Kenta Gallagher	Grant Ferguson	Steven James
2013	Steven James	Isaac Pucci	Liam Glen
2014	Steven James	Michael Thompson	Isaac Pucci
2015	Iain Paton	Dylan Kerfoot-Robson	Michael Thompson
2016	Frazer Clacherty	Mark McGuire	David Creber
2017	Frazer Clacherty	Iain Paton	Christopher Rothwell
2018	Frazer Clacherty	Cameron Orr	Christopher Rothwell
2019	Tom Pidcock	Sean Flynn	Cameron Orr
2020	Cancelled due to COVID-19 pandemic		
2021	Harry Birchill	Charlie Aldridge	Rory McGuire
2022	Charlie Aldridge	Joseph Blackmore	Rory McGuire

Junior	1st	2nd	3rd
1999	Richard Phillips-Schofield	Liam Killeen	Joe Armstrong
2000	Liam Killeen	Graham Martin	Phil Spencer
2001	Jordan Aveyard	Simon Richardson	Ross Adams
2002	Steven Clarke	Jonathan Tiernan-Locke	Alex Cutler
2003	Richard Firth	Ian Legg	Robert Wardell
2004	Ian Legg	Christoffel Langdon	Ian Field
2005	Alex Atkins	William Thompson	Jamie Harris
2006	Tom Last	Shaun Hurrell	David Fletcher
2007	David Fletcher	Hamish Creber	Alex Paton
2008	Hamish Creber	Sebastian Batchelor	Calum Chamberlain
2009	Kenta Gallagher	Steven James	Robert Hassan
2010	Steven James	Grant Ferguson	Kenta Gallagher
2011	Matthew Sumpton	Alex Baker	Ben Summer
2013	Michael Thompson	Iain Paton	Stuart Wilcox
2014	Frazer Clacherty	Thomas Craig	Dylan Kerfoot-Robson
2015	Frazer Clacherty	William Gascoyne	Mark McGuire
2016	William Gascoyne	Cameron Orr	Stan Pritchard
2017	Daniel Tulett	Cameron Orr	Calum Fernie
2018	Sean Flynn	Charlie Aldridge	Cameron Mason
2019	Harry Birchill	Jonte Willins	Jamie Johnson
2020	Cancelled due to COVID-19 pandemic		
2021	Corran Carrick-Anderson	Ben Chilton	Nathan Smith
2022	Max Greensill	Bjoern Koerdt	Nathan Smith

==== Women ====
Senior	1st	2nd	3rd
1991	Sally Hibberd		
1992	Caroline Alexander		
1993	Caroline Alexander		
1994	Caroline Alexander		
1995	Caroline Alexander		
1996	Tracy Brunger	Louise Robinson	Jenny Copnall
1997	Caroline Alexander		
1998	Tracy Brunger		
1999	Caroline Alexander	Louise Robinson	Jenny Copnall
2000	Caroline Alexander	Louise Robinson	Tracy Brunger
2001	Caroline Alexander		
2002	Caroline Alexander	Suzanne Thomas	Jenny Copnall
2003	Jenny Copnall	Suzanne Thomas	Rebecca Webb
2004	Suzanne Thomas	Jenny Copnall	Fiona Walker
2005	Jenny Copnall	Katy Simcock	Kate George
2006	Jenny Copnall	Ruth McGavigan	Kim Hurst
2007	Jenny Copnall	Jennifer O'Connor	Ruth McGavigan
2008	Jenny Copnall	Paula Moseley	Suzanne Clarke
2009	Suzanne Clarke	Jenny Copnall	Sharon Laws
2010	Annie Last	Maddie Horton	Jenny Copnall
2011	Annie Last	Nikki Harris	Lee Craigie
2012	Nikki Harris	Lee Craigie	Melanie Alexander
2013	Lee Craigie	Jane Nuessli Fischer	Tracey Mosely
2014	Annie Last	Kerry MacPhee	Jessie Roberts
2015	Annie Last	Alice Barnes	Annie Simpson
2016	Annie Last	Kerry MacPhee	Maxine Filby
2017	Annie Last	Kerry MacPhee	Joanne Clay
2018	Annie Last	Kerry MacPhee	Nikki Brammeier
2019	Annie Last	Isla Short	Kerry MacPhee
2020	Cancelled due to COVID-19 pandemic		
2021	Isla Short	Kerry MacPhee	Holly MacMahon
2022	Annie Last	Evie Richards	Isla Short

Espoir	1st	2nd	3rd
2013	Bethany Crumpton	Rebecca Preece	Carla Haines
2014	Bethany Crumpton	Alice Barnes	Rebecca Preece
2015	Bethany Crumpton	Lucy Grant	Lucy Allan
2016	Evie Richards	Isla Short	Lucy Grant
2017	Evie Richards	Isla Short	Ffion James
2018	Evie Richards	Sophie Wright	Isla Short
2019	Evie Richards	Ffion James	Holly MacMahon
2020	Cancelled due to COVID-19 pandemic		
2021	Harriet Harnden	Anna Kay	Anna Flynn
2022	Harriet Harnden	Elena McGorum	Anna Flynn

Junior	1st	2nd	3rd
1999	Katherine Hibberd	Sarah Black	Joanne Raine
2000			
2001			
2002			
2003			
2004			
2005	Abi Greenaway	Fiona Blagg	Alix Chester
2006	Amy Thompson	Jessie Roberts	Marie Stuart
2007	Annabel Simpson	Annie Last	Marie Stuart
2008	Annie Last	Annabel Simpson	Carla Haines
2009	Ruby Miller	Carla Haines	Dannielle Rider
2010	Katie Winton	Hollie Bettles	Ruby Baker
2011	Carla Haines	Jessie Roberts	Anna Buick
2013	Alice Barnes	Isla Short	Sophie Fennell
2014	Isla Short	Evie Richards	Ffion James
2015	Ffion James	Erika Allen	Charlotte Broughton
2016	Sophie Wright	Emily Wadsworth	Amy Selibas
2017	Emily Wadsworth	Patsy Caines	Kim Baptista
2018	Harriet Harnden	Anna McGorum	Poppy Wildman
2019	Harriet Harnden	Anna Flynn	Anna McGorum
2020	Cancelled due to COVID-19 pandemic		
2021	Elena McGorum	Ella Maclean-Howell	Zoe Bäckstedt
2022	Ella Maclean-Howell	Emily Carrick-Anderson	Kacey Eyeington

=== Short Track ===
==== Men ====
Senior	1st	2nd	3rd
2022	Charlie Aldridge	Cameron Orr	Cameron Mason

==== Women ====
Senior	1st	2nd	3rd
2022	Annie Last	Evie Richards	Harriet Harnden

=== Downhill ===
==== Men ====
Senior	1st	2nd	3rd
1998	Rob Warner	Tim Ponting	Matthew Farmer
1999	Steve Peat	Crawford Carrick-Anderson	Ed Moseley
2000	Steve Peat	Rob Warner	Crawford Carrick-Anderson
2001	Rob Warner	Will Longden	Ed Moseley
2002	Steve Peat	Stuart Hughes	Stu Thomson
2003	Steve Peat	Will Longden	Marc Beaumont
2004	Gee Atherton	Steve Peat	Neil Donoghue
2005	Steve Peat	Marc Beaumont	Daniel Stanbridge
2006	Marc Beaumont	Neil Donoghue	Daniel Stanbridge
2007	Marc Beaumont	Neil Donoghue	Matthew Simmonds
2008	Steve Peat	Marc Beaumont	Neil Donoghue
2009	Gee Atherton	Ben Cathro	Matthew Simmonds
2010	Steve Peat	Gee Atherton	Josh Bryeland
2011	Ruaridh Cunningham	Adam Brayton	Alex Bond
2012			
2013	Gee Atherton	Joseph Smith	Greg Williamson
2014	Joshua Bryceland	Gee Atherton	Joseph Smith
2015	Danny Hart	Sam Dale	Ruaridh Cunningham
2016	Greg Williamson	Danny Hart	Steve Peat
2017	Greg Williamson	Charlie Hatton	Danny Hart
2018	Matt Walker	Danny Hart	Greg Williamson
2019	Danny Hart	Charlie Hatton	Joe Breeden
2020	Cancelled due to COVID-19 pandemic		
2021	Matt Walker	Charlie Hatton	Danny Hart
2022	Owen Scott	Sean Petig	Lewis Munro

Junior	1st	2nd	3rd
1998	Kristopher Lee	Jon Cheetham	Steve Barker
1999	Neil Donoghue	Robert Jarman	Alan Blyth
2000	Stu Thomson	Mark Ellison	Samuel Furness
2001	Jonathan Brain	Christopher Marshall	Nick Platt
2002	Gee Atherton	Marc Beaumont	Daniel Stanbridge
2003	Gee Atherton	James Gould	Philip Shucksmith
2004	David Young	Robert Smith	Matthew Simmonds
2005	Matthew Simmonds	Richard Thomas	Ralph Jones
2006	Brendan Fairclough	Ralph Jones	Ben Cathro
2007	Joshua Bryceland	Sam Dale	Ruaridh Cunningham
2008	Josh Bryceland	Sam Dale	Joseph Smith
2009	Bernard Kerr	Danny Hart	Harry Heath
2010			
2011			
2012			
2013	Innes Graham	Michael Jones	George Gannicott
2014	Laurie Greenland	Taylor Vernon	Reece Wilson
2015	Laurie Greenland	Neil Stewart	Frazer McCubbing
2016	Matt Walker	Charlie Hatton	Joe Breeden
2017	Matt Walker	Joe Breeden	Kade Edwards
2018	Kade Edwards	Jamie Edmondson	Henry Kerr
2019	Luke Williamson	James Elliott	Luke Mumford
2020	Cancelled due to COVID-19 pandemic		
2021	Preston Williams	William Brodie	Ryan Brannen
2022	Lewis Duncan	Logan Smith	Charlie McIver

==== Women ====
Senior	1st	2nd	3rd
1998	Tracy Moseley	Karen Van Meerbeck	Tamsyn Green
1999	Helen Mortimer	Tracy Moseley	Karen Van Meerbeck
2000	Tracy Moseley	Helen Mortimer	Karen Van Meerbeck
2001	Fionn Griffiths	Tracy Moseley	Adele Peat
2002	Tracy Moseley	Helen Gaskell	Helen Mortimer
2003	Helen Gaskell	Anja Rees-Jones	Emily Horridge
2004	Rachel Atherton	Maria Conway	Emily Horridge
2005	Rachel Atherton	Helen Gaskell	Anja Rees-Jones
2006	Tracy Moseley	Rachel Atherton	Helen Gaskell
2007	Tracy Moseley	Helen Gaskell	Fionn Griffiths
2008	Tracy Moseley	Helen Gaskell	Katy Curd
2009	Tracy Moseley	Helen Gaskell	Jessica Stone
2010	Jessica Stone	Katy Curd	Helen Gaskell
2011	Tracy Moseley	Katy Curd	Jessica Stone
2012			
2013	Rachel Atherton	Manon Carpenter	Jessica Stone
2014	Rachel Atherton	Manon Carpenter	Katy Curd
2015	Rachel Atherton	Manon Carpenter	Katy Curd
2016	Rachel Atherton	Tahnée Seagrave	Manon Carpenter
2017	Rachel Atherton	Tahnée Seagrave	Manon Carpenter
2018	Katy Curd	Megan Whyte	Abbie Sloan
2019	Stacey Fisher	Chloe Taylor	Becci Skelton
2020	Cancelled due to COVID-19 pandemic		
2021	Katherine Sharp	Stacey Fisher	Aston Tutt
2022	Kerry Wilson	Maxine Yates	Amber Simpson

Junior	1st	2nd	3rd
1998	Becci Fitch	Sarah Finney	
1999	Jo Leigh	Claire White	
2000	Rhian Atherton	Anna Collins	Sarah Barrell
2001	Rhian Atherton	Anna Collins	Lucy Collins
2002			
2003	Kirsty Price		
2004	Katy Curd		
2005	Aimee Dix		
2006	Aimee Dix		
2007	Kirsty Price		
2008	Jessica Stone	Monet Adams	Bex Reilly
2009	Monet Adams		
2010
2011	Manon Carpenter		
2012			
2013	Tahnée Seagrave	Charlotte Hughes	Charlotte Mallin Martin
2014	Charlotte Mallin Martin	Hope Jensen	
2015	Elena Melton	Aston Tutt	Rona Strivens
2016	Aston Tutt	Sumayyah Green	Maddy Brown
2017	Maya Atkinson	Rosy Monaghan	Sumayyah Green
2018	Rosy Monaghan	Maya Atkinson	Tea Jensen
2019	Rosy Monaghan	Tea Jensen	Megan Nevard
2020	Cancelled due to COVID-19 pandemic		
2021	Phoebe Gale	Jenna Fellows	Bethany McCully
2022	Nina-Yves Cameron		

=== 4-Cross ===
==== Men ====
Senior	1st	2nd	3rd
2004	Dan Atherton	Gee Atherton	Steve Peat
2005	Dale Holmes	Scott Beaumont	Will Longden
2006	Will Longdon	Dale Holmes	James Gould
2007	Dale Holmes	Scott Beaumont	Lewis Lacey
2008	Scott Beaumont	Will Longden	Lewis Lacey
2020	Cancelled due to COVID-19 pandemic		

Junior	1st	2nd	3rd
2005	Ben Stephenson	Jason Davies	George Marshall
2006	Chris Jackson	Pat Campbell	David Roberts
2014	Joe Wallbridge	Reece Richards	Conor Hudson
2020	Cancelled due to COVID-19 pandemic		

==== Women ====
Senior	1st	2nd	3rd
2005	Charlie Phillips	Lauren Smith	Kim Bent
2006	Joey Gough	Kirsty Price	
2020	Cancelled due to COVID-19 pandemic		

=== Marathon ===
==== Men ====
Senior	1st	2nd	3rd
2005	Nick Craig	James Ouchterlony	Ian Wilkinson
2006	Nick Craig	James Ouchterlony	John Veness
2007	James Ouchterlony	Nick Craig	Dave Collins
2008	Ian Wilkinson	Nick Craig	Duncan Jamieson
2009	Oli Beckingsale	Paul Oldham	Ian Bibby
2010	Oli Beckingsale	Lee Williams	Ian Wilkinson
2017	Tom Bell	Ben Thomas	Paul Oldham
2018	Nicholas Corlett	Ben Thomas	Paul Oldham
2019	Ben Thomas	Joe Griffiths	Nick Craig
2020	Cancelled due to COVID-19 pandemic		
2021	Jacob Scott	Frazer Clacherty	Connor Swift
2022	Ben Thomas	Thomas Mein	Cameron Orr

==== Women ====
Senior	1st	2nd	3rd
2006	Caroline Jackson	Liz Scalia	Helen Purdy
2006	Jenny Copnall	Liz Scalia	Paula Moseley
2007	Liz Scalia	Sally Bigham	Melanie Alexander
2008	Sally Bigham	Liz Scalia	Paula Moseley
2009	Sally Bigham	Jenny Copnall	Jane Nuessli
2010	Sally Bigham	Jane Nuessli	Lesley Ingram
2011	No Event		
2012	Jane Nuessli	Rachel Fenton	Verity Appleyard
2013	Sally Bigham	Jane Nuessli	Catherine Williamson
2014	Sally Bigham	Rickie Cotter	Melanie Alexander
2015	Kerry MacPhee	Lee Craigie	Melanie Alexander
2017	Amy Nolan	Erica Tibbot	Katherine Simpson
2018	Sally Bigham	Rebecca Leaper	Verity Appleyard
2019	Ruth Miller		
2020	Cancelled due to COVID-19 pandemic		
2021	Isla Short	Amy-Jo Hansford	Joanne Thom
2022	Amy Henchoz	Sophie Johnson	Christina Wiejak
