= Marin Bikes =

American bicycle manufacturer

Marin Mountain Bikes Inc.
- Trade name: Marin Bikes
- Type: Private
- Industry: Bicycles
- Headquarters: Petaluma, California, US
- Key people: Matt VanEnkevort (CEO)
- Products: Bicycles
- Website: www.marinbikes.com

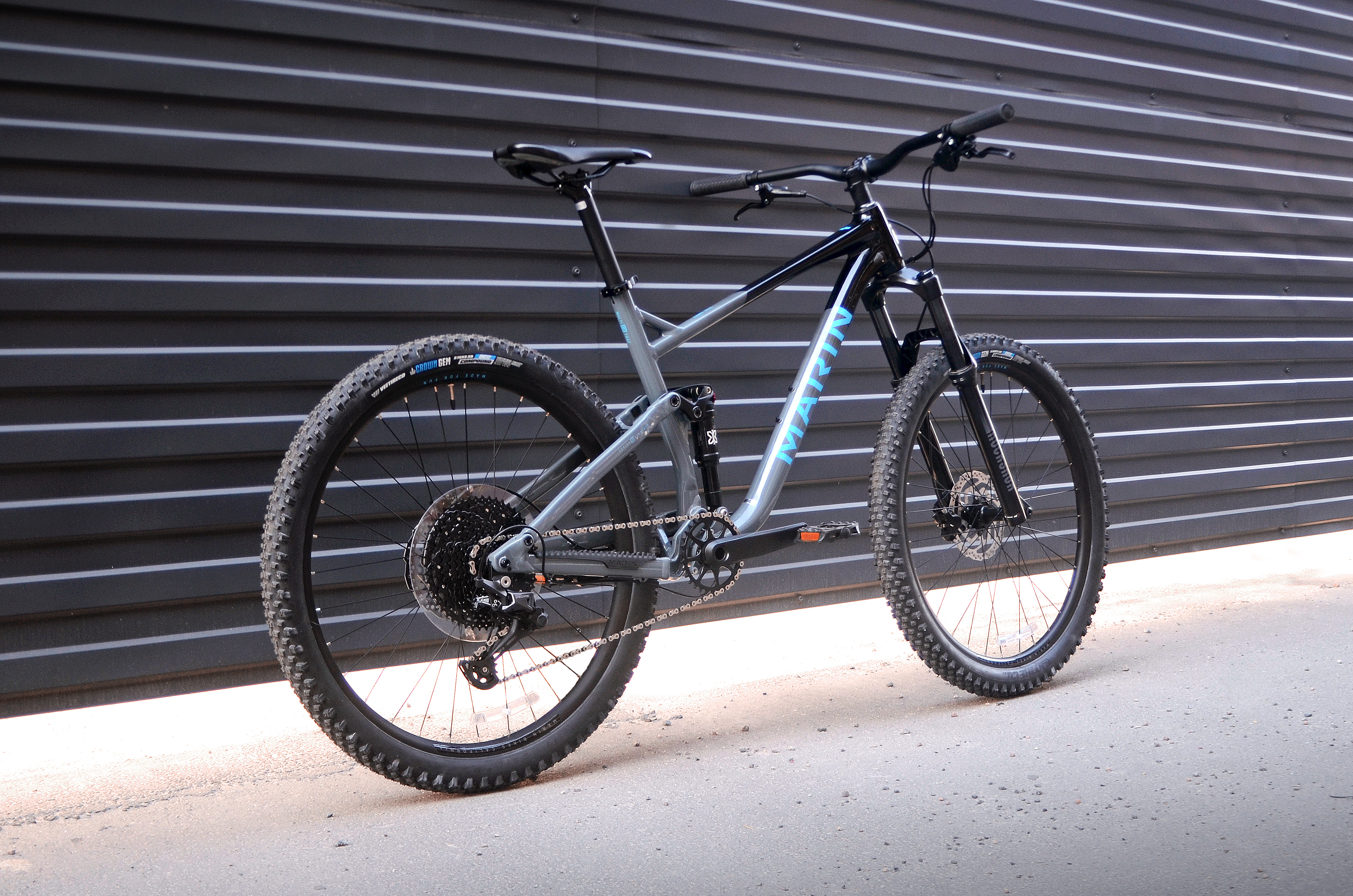
A Marin mountain bike

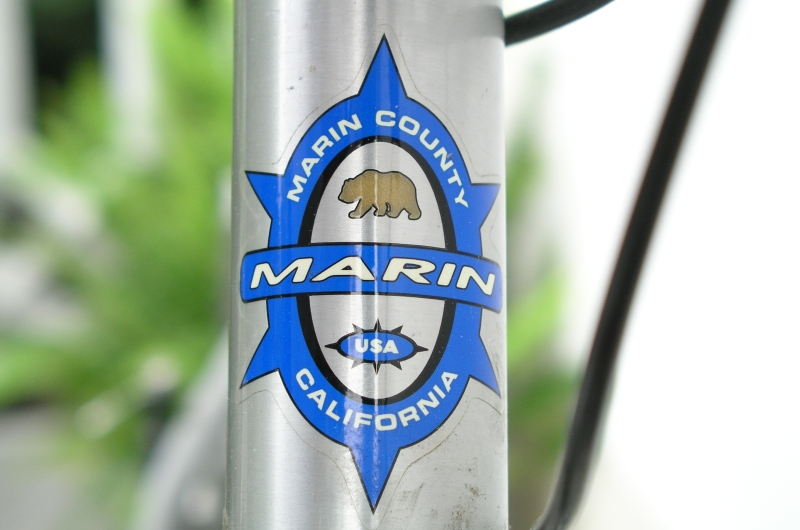
Previous Marin logo

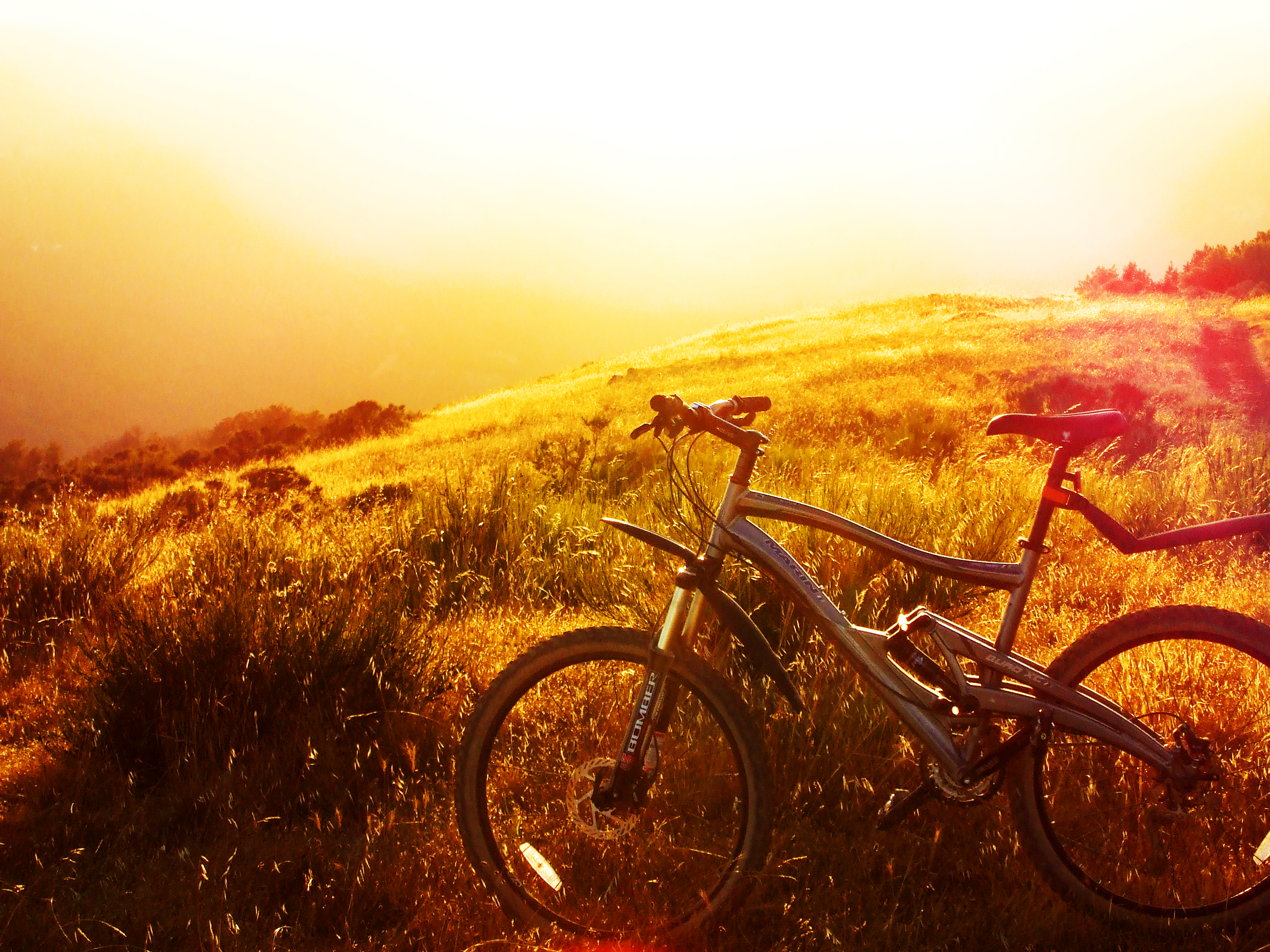
A Marin bike atop Bald Mountain (California).

Marin Bikes (legally incorporated as Marin Mountain Bikes Inc., stylised as MARIN) is a bicycle manufacturer in Sonoma County, California, established in 1986. It specializes in mountain bikes but also makes other types. Many of its bicycle models are named after locations in and around Marin County, where it was originally headquartered.

== Bicycle range ==
Marin offers mountain bikes (full suspension & hardtail), road, street/urban, comfort and specific designs for women & children as well as ebikes. They are generally placed in the mid-high end bracket of each respective market.

Since the late 1990s Marin has manufactured full suspension mountain bikes. Working with Jon Whyte, a British engineer who worked with Benetton Formula One racing cars in gearbox design, Marin developed a single-pivot rear suspension. Subsequent innovations including the TARA (Travel And Ride Adjustable) and quad link suspensions have lost the purity of the original concept but have maintained their popularity.

== Timeline ==
- 1986 Marin is founded by Bob Buckley, whose first order of business is to hire Marin County notable (and Mountain Bike hall-of-famer) Joe Murray to help with product design. Marin’s first product is the Madrone Trail, a $199 mountain bike.
- 1996 Marin is the first company to win an XC National Championship aboard a full suspension bike with Paul Lasenby winning the UK national title.
- 2003 Bob steps back in as acting president after a three-year hiatus with the desire to refocus the brand’s product offerings. Marin’s first Quad Link suspension bike is launched.
- 2004 Marin Bikes moves to the old Grateful Dead building in Novato, taking over its 32,000sq ft office and warehouse space. The actual Dead recording studio remains operational until late 2007, with surviving band members and other area musicians rolling though the facilities.
- 2008 construction of a second building is completed with addition of a 1,600sq ft office dedicated to product and design.
- February 2012, at age 66 Buckley sells Marin Bikes to a European Investment firm/private holding group. The business remains headquartered in Marin County and is operated as an independent group, managed by Tom Herington, Marin’s former CEO/CIO. Herington had worked with Buckley and Marin Bikes for 25 years as a contract consultant before being appointed CEO in 2011.
- July 2012, Matt VanEnkevort joined the company as CEO. Herington moved to the COO role. VanEnkevort had worked at Full Speed Ahead, Inc. in Washington State.
