= Annie Last =

British cross-country mountain biker

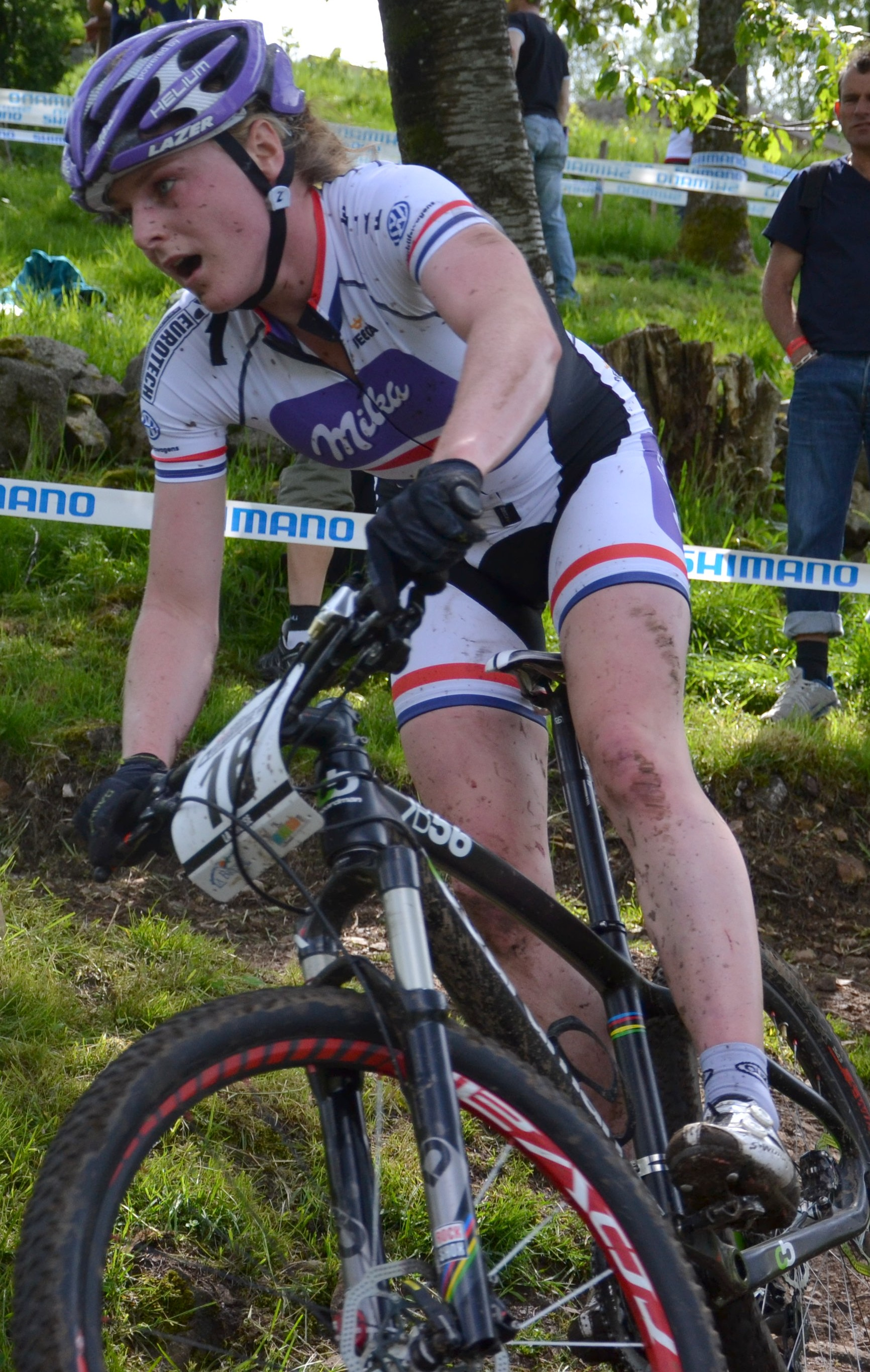
- Annie Last in 2012

Personal information
- Born: 7 September 1990 (age 36) Bakewell, Derbyshire
- Height: 168 cm (5 ft 6 in)
- Weight: 59 kg (130 lb)

Cycling career
- Sport: Cycling
- Current team: KMC-Ekoï-SR Suntour
- Disciplines: Cross-country mountain biking, cyclo-cross
- Role: Rider

Professional teams
- 2012: Milka Superior
- 2013–2014: Trek Factory Racing
- 2016-2017: Silverback OMX Pro Team
- 2018-: KMC-Ekoï-SR Suntour

Major wins
- Mountain bike National XC Championships (2010, 2011, 2014–2019, 2022) XC World Cup 1 individual win (2017)
Medal record
Women's mountain bike racing
Representing Great Britain
World Championships
Silver medal – second place	2010 Mont-Sainte-Anne	Cross-country (U23)
Silver medal – second place	2011 Champéry	Cross-country (U23)
Silver medal – second place	2017 Cairns	Cross-country
Representing England
Commonwealth Games
Gold medal – first place	2018 Gold Coast	Cross-country

Annie Last (born 7 September 1990), is an English professional cyclist, representing Great Britain and England, who specialises in mountain biking and cyclo-cross. She was chosen as a female competitor in the cross country mountain bike event for the Great Britain team at the 2012 Summer Olympics, going on to take 8th place.

Last won the silver medal in the mountain bike cross-country event at the 2017 UCI Mountain Bike World Championships, before taking the gold medal in the same event at the 2018 Commonwealth Games. She competed at the 2018 Cross Country European Championships.

== Career ==
Last was introduced to mountain biking by her father and brother, Tom as she accompanied them on racing trips. In 2009, she joined the British Cycling Olympic Academy programme, and was originally expected to be a potential athlete for the 2016 Summer Olympics. During the two-year-long build up for the 2012 Summer Olympics, she elected to compete in full adult competition instead of the under-23 events she was normally entitled to enter. This was in order to enhance her chances of competing at the Games.

At the World Cup event in Dalby Forest during May 2011, she finished a career best of 14th place. At the first World Cup event of 2012, in Pietermaritzburg, South Africa, she placed ninth, although at one point she was leading the race. She finished one place better, in 8th place, at the World Cup event in La Bresse, and later another 9th-place finish in Windham in the United States.

Her qualification for the 2012 Olympics came down to the World Cup event in La Bresse in May 2012. Great Britain did not get an automatic qualification spot for the women's mountain biking event, and so finishes in international events were required for the team to gain a place at the Games in the event. She finished eighth at the event, giving Great Britain a spot at the Olympics in her event, and was expected to be announced in the British team for the Games. Her place in the women's cross country was later confirmed along with Liam Killeen, who will compete in the men's competition.

In March, 2017, Last took part in the eight-day Absa Cape Epic stage race for the first time and finished second with South African partner Mariske Strauss. It was Last's first Cape Epic, which takes place in the Western Cape, South Africa, every year. The 2017 route was 651 km in total. She continued her good form later that season by taking her first UCI Mountain Bike World Cup win in Lenzerheide, Switzerland in July, becoming the first British woman to win a cross-country World Cup event since Caroline Alexander's victory in Sankt Wendel, Germany in 1997. She went on to finish second at the 2017 UCI Mountain Bike World Championships in Cairns, Australia in September, becoming the first British female medallist in the elite cross-country event. Annie Last and her partner Mariske Strauss worked to stay on GC podium at the 2018 Cape Epic after Strauss fell ill before the second last stage. Last broke through Canada's hold of, and earning England's first Commonwealth Games gold medal in the women's cross country at the 2018 Gold Coast Commonwealth Games.

She has been a member of professional mountain bike teams Milka-Superior, Trek Factory Racing, and Silverback OMX Pro Team. She currently races for KMC-Ekoï-SR Suntour.

== Personal life ==
Last has deferred attending university to study medicine in order to be a professional mountain biker. Her brother, Tom, was also a professional mountain bike and road cyclist before becoming a presenter for Global Cycling Network.

== Major results ==
=== Cyclo-cross ===
2006–2007
National Trophy Series

2nd Cheltenham
3rd Derby

2011–2012
3rd National Championships
2012–2013
3rd National Championships
2014–2015
3rd National Championships
2021–2022
2nd National Championships
National Trophy Series

3rd Gravesend

=== Mountain bike ===
2008
1st Cross-country, National Junior Championships
2010
1st Cross-country, National Championships
2nd Cross-country, UCI World Under-23 Championships
2011
1st Cross-country, National Championships
2nd Cross-country, UCI World Under-23 Championships
2012
BMC Racing Cup

1st Basel
1st Davos

National XC Series

1st Dalby Forest
1st Sherwood Pines

UCI XCO World Cup

3rd Val d'Isère

2014
1st Cross-country, National Championships
National XC Series

2nd Sherwood Pines

2015
1st Cross-country, National Championships
National XC Series

1st Glasgow
1st Plymouth

2016
1st Cross-country, National Championships
National XC Series

2nd Dalby Forest

2017
1st Cross-country, National Championships
UCI XCO World Cup

1st Lenzerheide

National XC Series

1st Dalby Forest

2nd Cross-country, UCI World Championships
2nd Overall Cape Epic (with Mariske Strauss)

1st Stage 6

2018
1st Cross country, Commonwealth Games
1st Cross-country, National Championships
National XC Series

1st Dalby Forest

3rd Overall Cape Epic (with Mariske Strauss)
2019
1st Cross-country, National Championships
Copa Catalana Internacional

1st Banyoles

National XC Series

1st Cannock Chase
1st Sherwood Pines

UCI XCC World Cup

2nd Nové Město

UCI XCO World Cup

3rd Snowshoe

2020
Copa Catalana Internacional

3rd Banyoles

2021
UCI XCC World Cup

3rd Albstadt

2022
National XCO Championships

1st Cross-country
1st Short track

National XC Series

1st Newcastleton

2nd Marathon, UCI World Championships
Copa Catalana Internacional

3rd Banyoles

2023
XCC French Cup

1st Guéret

Shimano Super Cup

2nd Baza
