= Scalia (surname) =

Scalia is an Italian surname. Notable people with the surname include:

- Antonin Scalia (1936–2016), American judge
- Daniela Scalia (born 1975), Italian television journalist and presenter
- Eugene Scalia (born 1963), U.S. Secretary of Labor, son of Antonin Scalia
- Jack Scalia (born 1950), American actor
- Jimmy Scalia (born 1960), American record producer
- Liz Scalia, British-Italian cyclist
- Pietro Scalia (born 1960), Italian-American film editor
- Silvia Scalia (born 1995), Italian swimmer
- Vito Scalia (1925–2009), Italian politician
