= David Baker (track cyclist) =

English cyclist

Personal information
- Nationality: England
- Born: 28 December 1965 (age 60) Hertfordshire

David Baker (born 1965), is a male retired track cyclist who competed for England. He is not to be confused with the Cyclo-cross and mountain bike rider David Baker.

== Cycling career ==
Baker was a National track champion over 1Km and 5Km in 1988.

He represented England in the 1 km time trial and points race, at the 1990 Commonwealth Games in Auckland, New Zealand.
