= Martyn Ashton =

Welsh racing cyclist and team manager

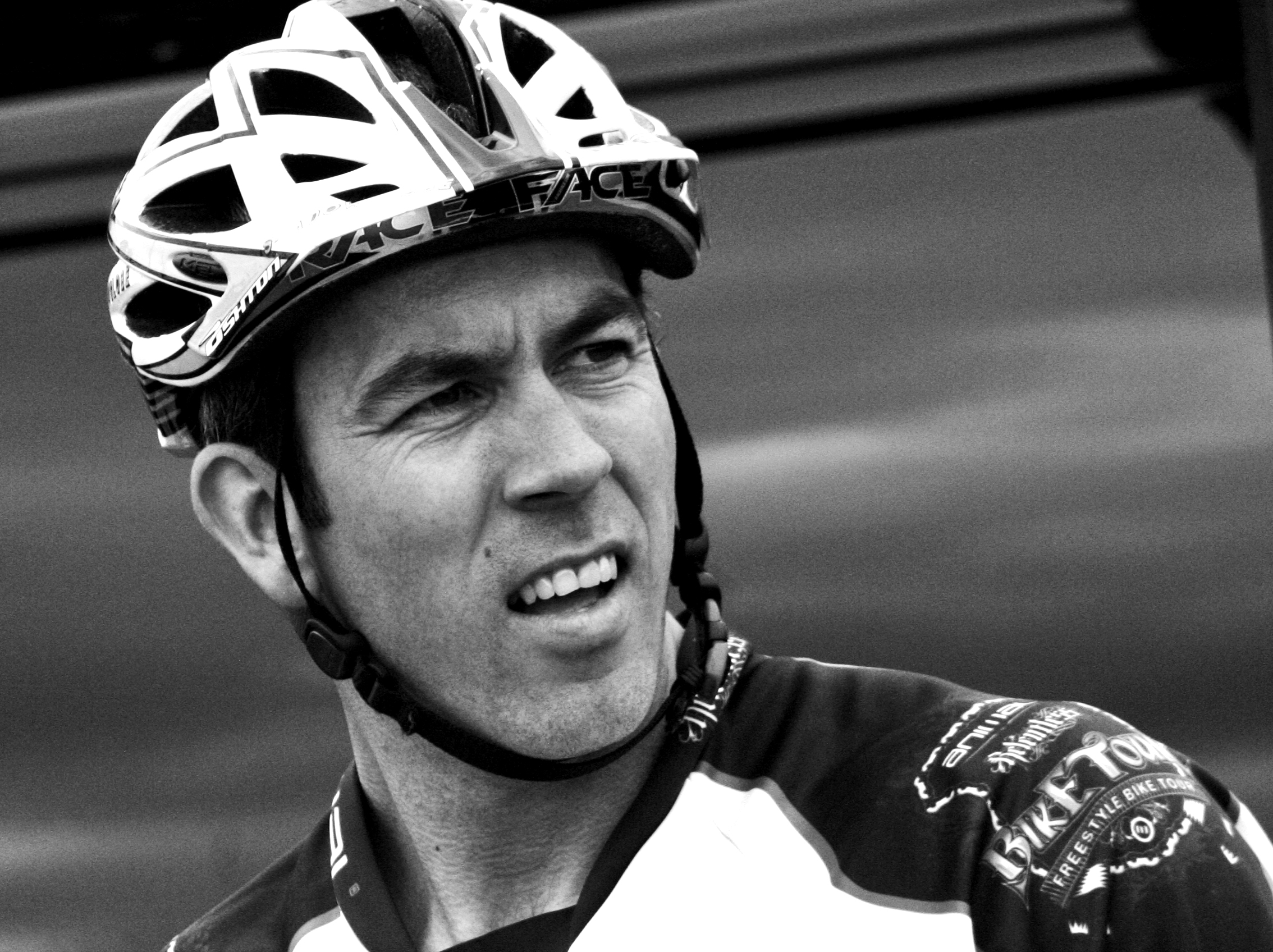
- Ashton at the HUB Festival

Personal information
- Full name: Martyn Ashton
- Born: 2 December 1974 (age 51)

Cycling career
- Sport: Cycling
- Discipline: MTB (mountain biking)
- Role: Rider
- Rider type: Trials

Professional teams
- 1997: Volvo–Cannondale
- 2005: Animal MBUK
- 2008–2010: Team Ashton Diamondback
- 2014–present: Global Mountain Bike Network (GMBN)

Major wins
- 39 world championships

Martyn Ashton (born 2 December 1974) is a former British and World Champion mountain bike trials rider, stunt rider and team manager. He had been riding professional trials since 1993, and has been described as a mountain biking legend, and credited with turning trials riding into one of the fast-growing areas of the sport of mountain biking. Ashton was paralysed in an accident in 2013, during a bike trials demo at the British Moto GP.

== Biography ==
Martyn Ashton is a retired trials and stunt cyclist who started-out as a child motorcycle trials rider but took-up mountain bike trials in the early 1990s. He is a four-time British Biketrial Champion and former World Expert Biketrial Champion, and the Guinness World Record Holder for the Mountain Bike High Jump. In 2008 he entered the Mountain Biking UK 'Hall of Fame'.

Besides riding trials, Ashton has also designed exhibition stages and products for his own Ashton Bikes range. He has had extensive media coverage, and published his own Hop Idol column in the MBUK mountain biking magazine.

In Ashton's 2012 viral YouTube video “Road Bike Party”, he rode a road bicycle in stunts typical of trials. A sequel video entitled "Road Bike Party 2" was released the following year and proved even more successful.

Ashton first broke his back in 2003, when he compressed a vertebra and fractured it during a fall after misjudging a landing. He soon recovered and returned to riding. Ashton again broke his back on 1 September 2013 when he fell from a 3-metre high bar during a demo at Moto GP, causing serious injuries to his spinal cord which left him paralysed.

Since his accident, Ashton has continued his pursuit of the outdoors with customized all-terrain wheelchairs. He returned to mountain bike riding with a heavily customised bike, and in 2017 took part in the Crankworx Air DH in Whistler, British Columbia.

Ashton currently lives in Port Talbot, Wales.
