= Jason McRoy =

English racing cyclist (1971–1995)

Personal information
- Full name: Jason McRoy
- Nickname: JMC
- Born: 26 November 1971 Luton, Bedfordshire, England
- Died: 24 August 1995 (aged 23) Woodhead Pass, Derbyshire, England

Cycling career
- Sport: Cycling
- Disciplines: BMX, MTB
- Role: Rider
- Rider type: Downhill

Professional teams
- 1992: Team MBUK
- 1994–1995: Specialized/2 Calorie Quest

Jason McRoy (26 November 1971 – 24 August 1995) was an English professional mountain bike racer. McRoy was the first British rider to join an American professional mountain bike team – Specialized/2 Calorie Quest – and was a UK National downhill champion.

== Cycling career ==
Despite being born with a hole in his heart and enduring a childhood beset by illness, McRoy developed an early love of cycling. Following childhood success in BMX racing – curtailed by a serious injury to his knee, and a consequent period off his bike to recuperate – McRoy first tried downhill mountain bike racing at age 17. In his first race, despite still being registered as a Junior, his time was sufficiently quick for him to take third place overall. McRoy rose to international prominence after taking second place in the prestigious Mammoth Kamikaze race in 1993, the first year that the event was held to the 'Eliminator' format. It was following this success that Specialized USA signed him for the 1994 season.

== Death and legacy ==
He was killed in a motorcycle accident on the A628 Woodhead Pass between Manchester and Sheffield, England. There is currently a memorial up on this road where flowers and banners have been placed.

In 2009, he was inducted into the British Cycling Hall of Fame.

== Results ==
- 2nd Reebok Eliminator (1993)
- Great Britain national downhill champion (1993)
