= Tracy Moseley =

British professional racing cyclist (born 1979)

Personal information
- Full name: Tracy Marie Moseley
- Born: 12 April 1979 (age 47) England; United Kingdom
- Height: 1.63 m (5 ft 4 in)

Cycling career
- Sport: Cycling
- Current team: retired
- Discipline: MTB
- Role: Rider
- Rider type: Enduro

Professional teams
- 1995: Volvo/Cannondale
- 2001–2008: Kona
- 2009–2015: Trek World Racing

Tracy Marie Moseley (born 12 April 1979) is a British professional racing cyclist who was born in Worcester, specialising in downhill mountain bike racing. Moseley's brother, Ed, was also a mountain biker, it was after he began riding cross country mountain bike races that a race was held on their farm in 1992; this was Tracy's first competition. Her first foray into downhilling came in 1994. Moseley's first international race was the World Championships in 1995 where she finished 8th. The following year she was funded by the Jason McRoy fund, to ride a French National event at Les Menuires. Moseley continued to race with increasing success, and despite sitting her exams late due to her racing schedule, graduated with a 2:1 degree in Biological Sciences in 2000.

== Palmarès ==
1995
1st (United Kingdom) DH, British National Mountain Biking Championships - Junior
1st Overall, DH National Points Series - Junior

1996
1st (United Kingdom) DH, British National Mountain Biking Championships - Junior
1st Overall, DH National Points Series - Junior

1997
2nd DH, UCI Mountain Bike World Championships - Junior
1st (United Kingdom) DS, British National Mountain Biking Championships
1st Overall, DH National Points Series

1st DH National Points Series, Round 1
1st DH National Points Series, Round 2

1998
1st (United Kingdom) DH, British National Mountain Biking Championships
1st (United Kingdom) DS, British National Mountain Biking Championships
1st Overall, DH National Points Series

1999
2nd DH, British National Mountain Biking Championships
1st Overall, DH National Points Series

1st DH National Points Series, Round 1
1st DH National Points Series, Round 2
1st DH National Points Series, Round 3

2000
1st (United Kingdom) DH, British National Mountain Biking Championships
1st Overall, DH National Points Series

2001
1st (United Kingdom) DS, British National Mountain Biking Championships
2nd DH, British National Mountain Biking Championships

2002
3rd Overall, DH UCI Mountain Bike World Cup

1st DH UCI Mountain Bike World Cup, Round at Fort William
3rd DH UCI Mountain Bike World Cup, Round at Mount St. Anne
5th DH UCI Mountain Bike World Cup, Round at Telluride
4th DH UCI Mountain Bike World Cup, Round at Les Gets

4th DH, UCI Mountain Bike World Championships
1st (United Kingdom) DH, British National Mountain Biking Championships
1st (United Kingdom) 4X, British National Mountain Biking Championships
1st DH National Points Series, x3 Rounds
2nd Overall, Norba DH

1st Norba DH, Round 5

2003
4th DH, UCI Mountain Bike World Championships, Lugano
3rd Overall, DH UCI Mountain Bike World Cup

4th DH UCI Mountain Bike World Cup, Round 1, Scotland
2nd DH UCI Mountain Bike World Cup, Round 2, France
2nd DH UCI Mountain Bike World Cup, Round 3, Mount St. Anne
6th DH UCI Mountain Bike World Cup, Round 4, Grouse Mountain
6th DH UCI Mountain Bike World Cup, final round, Austria

1st Norba DH, Round 1, Big Bear
1st DH, Sea Otter Classic USA
5th Overall, 4X UCI Mountain Bike World Cup

1st 4X UCI Mountain Bike World Cup, Round 2, France

1st (United Kingdom) 4X, British National Mountain Biking Championships
1st DH National Points Series, Round 4
1st DH National Points Series, Round 2
1st DH National Points Series, Round 1

2004
4th Overall, DH UCI Mountain Bike World Cup

1st DH UCI Mountain Bike World Cup, Round 1, Fort William
9th DH UCI Mountain Bike World Cup, Round 2, Les Deux Alpes
4th DH UCI Mountain Bike World Cup, Round 3, Schladming
3rd 4X UCI Mountain Bike World Cup, Round 3, Schladming
5th UCI Mountain Bike World Cup, Round 4, Mount St. Anne
8th 4X UCI Mountain Bike World Cup, Round 4, Mount St. Anne
3rd DH UCI Mountain Bike World Cup, Round 5, Calgary

1st Overall, Maxxis Cup

2005
6th DH, UCI Mountain Bike World Championships
2nd Overall, DH UCI Mountain Bike World Cup

2nd DH UCI Mountain Bike World Cup, Round 1 Spain
14th DH UCI Mountain Bike World Cup, Round 2 Germany
5th DH UCI Mountain Bike World Cup, Round 3 Austria
1st DH UCI Mountain Bike World Cup, Round 4 Mount St. Anne
1st DH UCI Mountain Bike World Cup, Round 5 Brazil
3rd DH UCI Mountain Bike World Cup, Round 6 New Mexico
7th DH UCI Mountain Bike World Cup, Round 7 Pila
1st DH UCI Mountain Bike World Cup, Round 8 Fort William

1st Mega Avalanche Reunion Island
1st Overall, Maxxis Cup Series

1st Maxxis Cup, Round 3, Mongenevre

1st DH, Sea Otter Classic USA
1st DH National Points Series, Round 6
2nd DH National Points Series, Fort William
4th DH National Points Series, Round 1

2006
1st (United Kingdom) DH, British National Mountain Biking Championships, Moelfre
2nd DH, UCI Mountain Bike World Championships, Rotorua (NZL)
1st Overall, DH UCI Mountain Bike World Cup

1st DH UCI Mountain Bike World Cup, Round 1, Vigo
1st DH UCI Mountain Bike World Cup, Round 2, Fort William
1st DH UCI Mountain Bike World Cup, Round 3, Willingen
2nd DH UCI Mountain Bike World Cup, Round 4, Mount Saint Anne
3rd DH UCI Mountain Bike World Cup, Round 5, Brazil
3rd DH UCI Mountain Bike World Cup, Round 6, Schmadling

1st DH, Sea Otter Classic USA
1st Maxxis Cup 1 – Gouevia, Portugal
1st NZ National 4 – Wanganui
1st DH National Points Series, Round 2, Innerleithen
1st DH National Points Series, Round 4, Fort William

2007
1st (United Kingdom) DH, British National Mountain Biking Championships
4th DH, UCI Mountain Bike World Championships, Fort William (GBR)
2nd Overall, DH UCI Mountain Bike World Cup

2nd DH UCI Mountain Bike World Cup, Round 1, Vigo
7th DH UCI Mountain Bike World Cup, Round 2, Champery
2nd DH UCI Mountain Bike World Cup, Round 3, Mount Ste Anne
4th DH UCI Mountain Bike World Cup, Round 4, Schladming
2nd DH UCI Mountain Bike World Cup, Round 5, Maribor

1st Garbanzo DH, Crankworx, Whistler
1st Air DH, Crankworx, Whistler
1st Dual Slalom, Crankworx, Whistler
1st Canadian Open DH
1st Maxxis Cup Montgenevre
1st DH National Points Series, Round 2, Ae Forest
1st DH National Points Series, Round 5, Innerleithen

2008
1st (Australia) DH, Australian National Mountain Biking Championships, Mount Stromlo (AUS)
2nd 4X, Australian National Mountain Biking Championships, Mount Stromlo (AUS)
4th UCI Mountain Bike World Cup, Round 2, Andorra
1st Australian National Series Final, Mount Beauty
1st New Zealand North Island Cup, Auckland
1st Karapoti Classic XC race
1st Kona Colville Connection XC race
1st DH, Oceania Champs
1st 4X, Oceania Champs
1st DS, Oceania Champs
1st Australian Victoria State DH Championship

2010
1st DH, UCI Mountain Bike World Championships, Mont Sainte-Anne, Canada
