= Mariske Strauss =

South African cyclist

- Born: 16 May 1991 (age 34)
- Occupation: Cyclist

Mariske Strauss (born 16 May 1991) is a South African cross-country mountain biker.

== Career ==
=== 2020 ===
Strauss wins the 4 day stage trace, Tankwa Trek with partner Candice Lill.

=== 2019 ===
Racing as Silverback Fairtree, Strauss teamed up with Swedish rider Jennie Stenerhag to win the 4 day Momentum Health Tankwa Trek presented by Biogen. The duo also raced together at the 2019 ABSA Cape Epic.

=== 2018 ===
Strauss raced as a part of UCI World cup team, Silverback OMX Pro Team. She won the South African Mountain Bike Cross-country championship. Raced with Annie Last to finish 3rd overall on the podium at the ABSA Cape Epic

=== 2017 ===
Strauss crowned 2017 South African National Cross-country Champion at Mankele Mountain Bike Park.

In 2017 Strauss teamed up with Annie Last, for the ABSA Cape Epic and finished in 2nd place overall.

=== 2014 ===
She won South African National women's cross-country title at Thaba Trails, Gauteng.
