= Mountain Bike Rider =

British cycling magazine

- Cover of the final issue (November 2023)
- Editor: Danny Milner
- Categories: Cycling
- Frequency: 13 times a year
- First issue: 14 March 1997
- Final issue: November 2023
- Company: Future plc
- Country: United Kingdom
- Based in: Reading, Berkshire
- Language: English
- Website: Mountain Bike Rider

Mountain Bike Rider (MBR) was a magazine about mountain bike riding published 13 times a year by Future plc and based in Reading. The magazine wa edited by Danny Milner. MBR was founded in 1997.

== Early history ==
The first edition of Mountain Bike Rider (MBR) was issued 14 March 1997.

== Overview ==
MBR publishes inspiring features, authoritative reviews of bikes and equipment, route guides, and skills advice. Along with technique tips, there are fitness drills and exercises to help riders get stronger and fitter and stay healthy.

Publishing since 1997, the magazine focuses in highlighting both domestic and international mountain biking hotspots, with travel guides to locations in Europe and beyond.

The brand was formerly owned by IPC Media a publisher that was renamed to become Time Inc. UK and then TI Media. Future PLC bought TI Media in April 2020 (Future previously owned competitor Mountain Biking UK until its sale to Immediate Media Company in 2014). The magazine ceased publishing in print and went digital only in October 2023.

== Gear Review Process ==
Mountain Bike Rider (MBR) has been creating impartial content since it was first published in 1997.

The quality of MBR's reviews and buyers guides is built upon a rigorous testing procedure as well as the knowledge and experience of the test team that is a highly regarded in the bike industry, and known for delivering comparative reviews that are highly focussed, making them as useful as possible to the reader.

The brand's commitments are:

- Reviews are conducted by some of the most experienced and knowledgeable riders in the business.
- Ratings are awarded only after a thorough testing process on a variety of terrain and benchmarked against the best options on the market.
- Tests are independent, and in no way influenced by advertisers.

In support of these commitments, all test bikes are weighed and measured by staff and suspension travel is also measured and compared against manufacturers claimed figures. For some tests, bikes are fitted with control tyres to even out differences in weight, handling and geometry and highlight differences in performance that are not easily and cheaply remedied.
