= Grant Ferguson =

Scottish-British cyclist

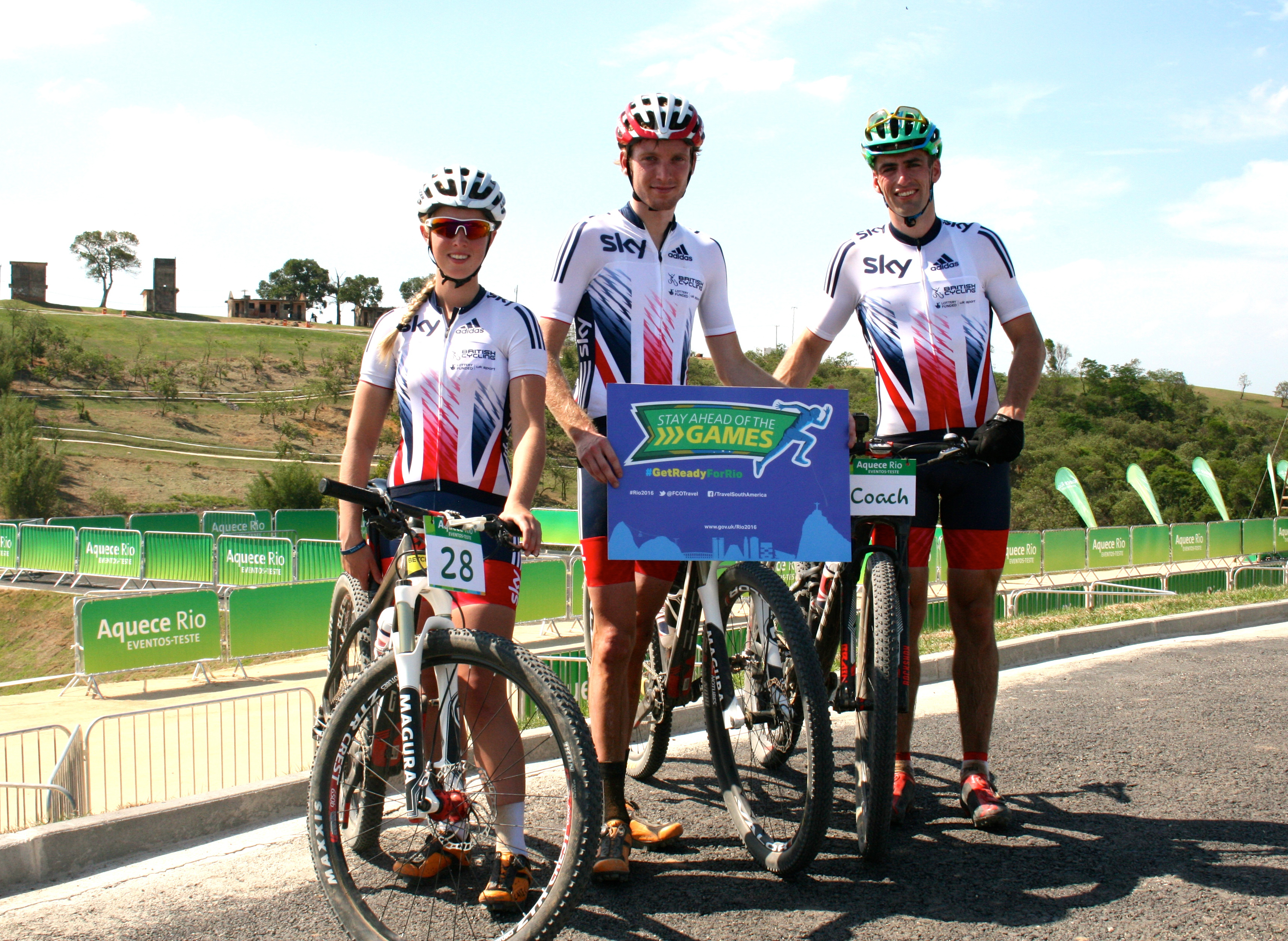
- Ferguson with the Team GB Mountain Bike Team

Personal information
- Born: 15 November 1993 (age 32) Chertsey, Surrey, England

Cycling career
- Sport: Cycling
- Disciplines: Cross-country; Cyclo-cross
- Role: Rider

Professional team
- 2016: Pedal Heaven

Grant Ferguson (born 15 November 1993) is a Scottish cross-country mountain biker and cyclo-cross cyclist. He represented Scotland at the 2014 Commonwealth Games and finished 5th in the cross-country race He represented Great Britain at the 2016 Summer Olympics in the cross-country race.

== Major results ==
=== Mountain bike ===
2010
2nd National Junior XCO Championships
2011
2nd UEC European Junior XCO Championships
2012
2nd National Under-23 XCO Championships
2013
1st National XCO Championships
1st Redruth XC
1st Hopton Woods XC
1st Hadleigh Farm XC
2014
1st National XCO Championships
1st Bundesliga XCO, Heubach
1st Sherwood Pines XC
1st Cannock Chase XC
UCI Under-23 XCO World Cup

2nd Méribel
3rd Pietermaritzburg
3rd Windham

2015
1st National XCO Championships
2nd UEC European Under-23 XCO Championships
3rd UCI World Under-23 XCO Championships
2016
1st National XCO Championships
2017
1st National XCO Championships
2018
1st National XCO Championships

2025
1st [Orkney Island Games]

=== Cyclo-cross ===
2010–2011
2nd National Junior Championships
2011–2012
3rd National Under-23 Championships
2012–2013
1st National Under-23 Championships
2013–2014
1st National Under-23 Championships
2014–2015
1st National Under-23 Championships
1st Derby, National Trophy Series
2017–2018
1st National Championships
