= Lydia Gould =

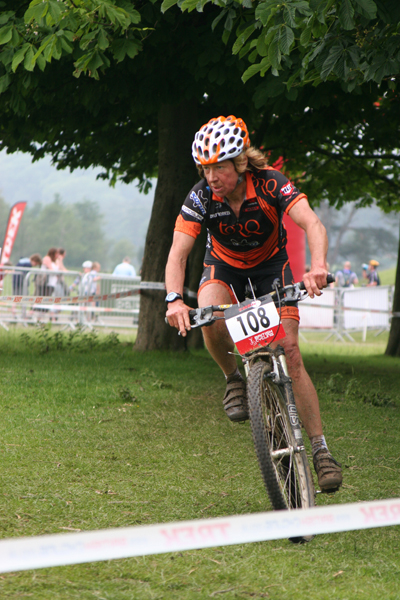
- British National MTB Marathon Champs, June 2008

Personal information
- Full name: Lydia Gould
- Born: 2 January 1956 (age 70) United Kingdom

Cycling career
- Sport: Cycling
- Discipline: MTB
- Role: Rider
- Rider type: XC & Marathon

Professional teams
- 2001–2005: Hargroves
- 2006–: Team Torq/Kona

Major wins
- 2000 and 2002 World Cyclo-Cross Champion 40-49 age category

Lydia Gould (born 1952-1957) is a racing cyclist specialising in cross country and marathon mountain bike racing, and is a prolific medallist at the national championships and national points series. In 2007, she opted to ride in the Expert category as opposed to the veteran in order to gain stiffer competition.

== Palmarès ==
2000 World Cyclo-Cross Champion [40-49 age category]
2nd XC, British National Mountain Biking Championships (Elite)

2001
1st (United Kingdom) XC, British National Mountain Biking Championships - Veteran
2002 World Cyclo-Cross Champion [40-49 age category]
2005
2nd XC, British National Mountain Biking Championships - Veteran
1st XC National Points Series, Round 1, Newnham Park - Veteran
5th Marathon, British National Mountain Biking Championships

2006
1st XC National Points Series, Round 2, Sherwood Pines - Veteran
1st XC National Points Series, Round 2, Margam Park - Veteran
4th Marathon, British National Mountain Biking Championships

2007
6th Marathon, British National Mountain Biking Championships
2nd Trek Marathon Series, Round 1
