= Lee Craigie =

Scottish cyclist (born 1978)

- Born: 20 December 1978 (age 47); Glasgow, Scotland

Lee Craigie (born 20 December 1978) is the Active Nation Commissioner for Scotland and official representative of walking, cycling and physical activity across the nation. She is a former professional mountain bike racer and director of the Adventure Syndicate. Craigie and her work have been featured in The Scotsman, BBC News, The Press and Journal, The Courier and more.

== Early career and education ==
Born in Glasgow, Craigie grew up in a sporting family and these early experiences led to her studying outdoor education as her first degree. She worked as a technical mountain guide in America and Australia, before training as a Child and Adolescent Psychotherapist. She started mountain biking in 2006 and represented Great Britain in 2011 and 2012 at the World MTB Championships.

In 2013 she joined the Cannondale team and later that year won the senior women's race at Cathkin Braes, Glasgow, becoming the UK national cross country champion. Craigie represented Scotland at the Glasgow 2014 Commonwealth Games, finishing 7th place in the cross-country race, also held at Cathkin Braes. In 2016 she won the UK 24 Hour Mountain Bike Championships and in that same year was part of the women's team that set the record time for the North Coast 500.

== Therapeutic cycling ==
Craigie founded Cycletherapy in 2009 using a grant from the Scottish Government to deliver cycle training to marginalised young people in the Scottish Highlands. She is an ambassador for the charity Venture Trust and uses her work with the Adventure Syndicate to inspire adolescent girls to be more physically active.
