= Scott Beaumont =

British mountain biker

Personal information
- Nickname: Boom Boom
- Born: 2 June 1978 (age 48) Northallerton, Yorkshire, England

Cycling career
- Sport: Cycling
- Disciplines: Mountain bike racing (downhill and fourcross)
- Role: Rider

Major wins
- British national 4X championship (2008–2009, 2012–2018, 2021)

Scott Beaumont (born 2 June 1978), nicknamed Boom Boom, is an English pro mountain bike racer, specialising in the disciplines of downhill and fourcross. He lives in the UK.

Beaumont was born in Northallerton, Yorkshire in 1978. He started racing BMX aged four, and went on to win several national titles, and was World BMX Champion in 1995 and 1996.

It was in 1996 that Beaumont first began to ride mountain bikes. The new discipline of dual slalom had been created, and mountain bike teams were looking for experienced BMX riders to transition into the new discipline. When dual slalom was replaced by four-cross, Beaumont made the transition. He remains a high-profile figure in the British mountain biking scene, and is one of the leading elite riders in the British national 4X series, winning the 2008, 2009, 2012, 2013, 2014, 2015, 2016, 2017, 2018, and 2021 British national 4X championship.
