= Jenny Copnall =

British racing cyclist

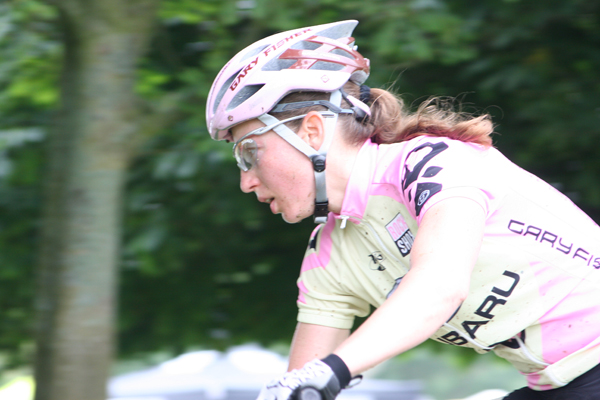
- British National MTB Marathon Champs. Margam Park, 1 June 2008

Personal information
- Full name: Jennifer Elizabeth Copnall
- Born: 19 November 1975 (age 50) England; United Kingdom
- Height: 1.65 m (5 ft 5 in)

Cycling career
- Sport: Cycling
- Discipline: MTB
- Role: Rider
- Rider type: XC & Marathon

Amateur teams
- Team Yellow Jersey
- Magic Cycles
- Bikepark-Raleigh

Professional teams
- 2001: Berghaus-Bianchi
- 2002–2003: Motorex Bianchi
- 2004–2008: Subaru-Gary Fisher
- 2009: Look

Jennifer Elizabeth Copnall (born 19 November 1975, Barnet) is a former professional racing cyclist from Barnet, specialising in cross country and marathon mountain bike racing, and is a multiple national champion. She also represented England at the 2002 Commonwealth Games in Manchester and rode for Great Britain at World and European Championships

== Palmarès ==
1996
3rd XC, British Elite National Mountain Biking Championships Eastridge, Shropshire
3rd in Final stage of Mtb Tour of Britain Pro-Elite, Derby
1997
29th and 2nd U23 UCI Mountain Bike World Cup, St Wendel, Germany
23rd and 2nd U23 UCI Mountain Bike World Cup, Czech Rep
1998
2nd XC, British National Mountain Biking Championships Builth Wells
22nd UCI World Cup round 5, Plymouth
45th World Mountain Bike Championship XC, Mt St Anne, Canada
1999
3rd XC, British National Mountain Biking Championships
37th UCI World Cup, Plymouth, UK

2001
3rd XC, British National Mountain Biking Championships Bringewood, Ludlow
30th Overall World Cup Mountain Bike Series

2002
3rd XC, British National Mountain Biking Championships
30th Overall, Mtb World Cup Series

2003
1st (United Kingdom) XC, British National Mountain Biking Championships Ludlow
1st Overall, XC National Points Series
25th European Mountain Biking Championships
32nd UCI Mountain Bike World Cup Rd1, St Wendel, Germany
26th UCI Mountain Bike World Cup, Mt St Anne, Canada
27th UCI Mountain Bike World Cup, Grouse Mountain, Canada

2004
2nd XC, British National Mountain Biking Championships
1st Overall, XC National Points Series
44th World Championships, Les Gets, France

2005
1st (United Kingdom) XC, British National Mountain Biking Championships
1st Overall, XC National Points Series

2006
1st (United Kingdom) XC, British National Mountain Biking Championships
1st (United Kingdom) Marathon, British National Mountain Biking Championships
1st Overall, XC National Points Series

1st Round 1, Sherwood Pines
1st Round 2, Margam Park
1st Round 3, Drumlanrig Castle
1st Round 4, Plymouth
1st Round 5, Checkendon

2007
1st (United Kingdom) XC, British National Mountain Biking Championships
18th World Marathon Championships

2008
1st XC, British National Mountain Biking Championships
1st Overall, XC, British National Points Series

2009
2nd XC British National Mountain Biking Championship

2010
3rd XC British National Mountain Bike Championship
