= Paula Moseley =

British racing cyclist and triathlete

Personal information
- Full name: Paula Moseley
- Born: United Kingdom

Cycling career
- Sport: Cycling
- Discipline: MTB
- Role: Rider
- Rider type: Marathon & XC

Professional team
- 2005–: Climb on Bikes RT

Paula Moseley is a British racing cyclist and triathlete, specialising in cross country and marathon mountain bike racing, and was the master women's national cross country champion in 2007.

== Palmarès ==
2005
1st Overall, XC National Points Series

1st XC National Points Series, Round 4, Margam Park - Expert
3rd XC National Points Series, Round 5, Sherwood - Expert

2006
1st (United Kingdom) XC, British National Mountain Biking Championships - Master
3rd Marathon, British National Mountain Biking Championships

2007
7th Trek Marathon Series, Round 1, Sherwood

2008
3rd Marathon, British National Mountain Biking Championships, Margam Park
3rd XC National Points Series, Round 1, Thetford
