= Nick Craig =

English cyclist

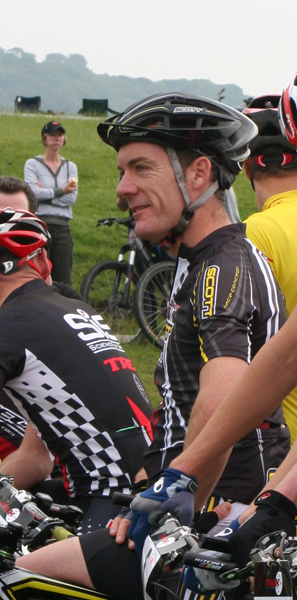
- British National MTB Marathon Champs. Margam Park, 1 June 2008

Personal information
- Full name: Nicholas Ian Craig
- Born: 3 April 1969 (age 57) England; Great Britain

Cycling career
- Sport: Cycling
- Disciplines: Cyclo-cross & MTB
- Role: Rider
- Rider type: Cyclo-cross, XC & Marathon

Professional teams
- 1991: Raleigh - Saab
- 1992–1993: Peugeot - Look
- 1993–1997: Diamond Back Racing
- ?: Science in Sport

Major wins
- National Champion x7 (at least)

Nicholas Ian Craig (born 3 April 1969, Stockport) is a professional racing cyclist specialising in cross country mountain bike racing and cyclo-cross, and a multiple national champion.

== Major results ==
=== Cyclo-cross ===
1994
2nd National Championships
1995
3rd National Championships
1996
1st National Championships
1998
1st National Championships
1999
2nd National Championships
2002
3rd National Championships
2004
2nd National Championships
2005
1st National Championships
2007
2nd National Championships

=== Mountain Bike ===
1999
3rd National XC Championships
2000
1st National XC Championships
2002
3rd National XC Championships
2003
1st National XC Championships
2005
1st National Marathon Championships
2nd National XC Championships
2006
1st National Marathon Championships
3rd National XC Championships
2007
2nd National Marathon Championships
3rd National XC Championships
2008
2nd National Marathon Championships
