= Fourcross =

Form of four-wheeled downhill mountain biking

Fourcross is a form of four-wheeled downhill mountain biking, which has the benefit of being suitable for disabled riders. It is a gravity sport, there's no propulsion. The rider has to actively use their body to corner bends and to prepare for jumps, through leaning their upper body and pumping their chair. The rider sits nearer to the ground than on a regular mountain bike. This makes the ride seem much faster, and that gives an adrenaline rush. These bikes can be handled by the riders themselves, without any assistance, and that gives independence and a feeling of freedom. In 2007, there were about 20 fourcrossers around the world.

== History ==
=== American origin ===
Fourcross was pioneered in Canada and the United States, in the late 1980s and early 1990s. The most memorable bike of that period was the Cobra gravity fourwheeler, designed by John Castilliano and piloted by John Davis. Davis made a point of participating in the mountainbike scene, having the same sponsors, riding the same events, and not making fourcross a separate sport.

The Grove DH1, designed and build by Bill Grove and ridden by Stacy Kohut, set the next benchmark. Grove was an outstanding welder and designer, who made a lot of bike prototypes for many brands. He also invented bike parts for BMX and MTB. Kohut is a Paralympic champion and has been the only professional fourcrosser for many years. When Grove Innovation stopped in 2000, Kohut bought the rights to build the fourwheeler and set up the R-ONE company (formerly Outlet Industries). Production ceased in around 2011.

== Adaptive Mountain Biking Trail Standards ==
In 2020 the Kootenay Adaptive Sport Association (KASA Canada) developed a comprehensive set of trail standards. They help planning, design and construct safe trails for Adaptive Mountain Bikes (aMTB). This means that the standards are not only for fourcross, but also for 2 to 4 wheeled handcycles, recumbent leg-cycles, bucket Bikes and tandem bikes. The standards include signs that show the difficulty of a trail, much like the rating of a ski piste, and the accessibility for each type of bike. Whistler Mountain Bike Park is using the standard and puts signs at their trails. There's also an Australian standard.
