= Steve Peat =

British mountain biker

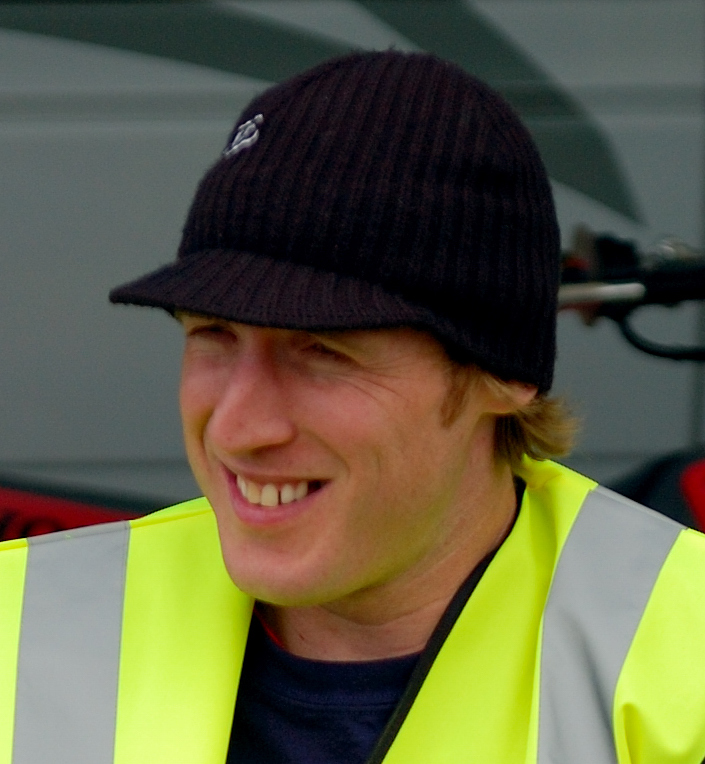
- Steve Peat in 2007

Personal information
- Full name: Steve Peat
- Nicknames: Peaty, Sheffield Steel
- Born: 17 June 1974 (age 52) England; Great Britain
- Height: 6 ft 3 in (1.91 m)
- Weight: 196 lb (89 kg; 14.0 st)

Cycling career
- Sport: Cycling
- Current team: Santa Cruz Syndicate
- Discipline: MTB
- Role: Rider/Ambassador
- Rider type: DH

Professional teams
- 1993: Langsett Cycles
- 1995: Saracen
- Mid 1990s: Team MBUK
- Late 1990s: GT Bikes
- 2002–2005: Orange Bikes
- 2006 –: Santa Cruz Syndicate

Major wins
- (United Kingdom) GBR DH National Champion (8 Wins) (Europe) EUR DH European Champion (3 Wins); UCI DH World Cup (17 Wins); UCI DH World Cup Overall (3 Wins); UCI DH World Champion (1 Win)
Medal record
Representing Great Britain
Mountain Bike
World Championships
Gold medal – first place	2009 Canberra	Downhill
Silver medal – second place	2000 Sierra Nevada	Downhill
Silver medal – second place	2001 Vail	Downhill
Silver medal – second place	2002 Kaprun	Downhill
Silver medal – second place	2008 Val Di Sol	Downhill

Steve Peat (born 17 June 1974 in Chapeltown, South Yorkshire), nicknamed "Sheffield Steel" or more commonly just "Peaty", is a British professional downhill mountain biker who was born and lives in Chapeltown, Sheffield, England. Prior to his career as a professional mountain biker Peat was employed as a plumber by James Lamb. He is married to Adele Croxon and has two sons, Jake and George Peat.

Peat began his career with little success riding for the Saracen team alongside Rob Warner, before moving in the mid-1990s to Team MBUK. He rode for GT Bicycles in the late 1990s and for the Orange team between 2002 and 2005, winning the Fort William downhill world cup round in 2005. He then joined the Santa Cruz Syndicate team for the 2006 season, which saw him finish 1st overall. He continues to race for Santa Cruz Syndicate.

As last man down the hill, Peat won the La Bresse downhill world cup round 2 on 10 May 2009 with a time of 02:07.14 knocking Sam Hill out of the hot seat for his 16th world cup round win, tying at the top of the all-time leader-board with Nicolas Vouilloz. Just one week later on 17 May 2009, at the third round of the UCI World Cup in Vallnord, Peat won again (besting compatriot Gee Atherton by just 0.02 seconds) making him the most successful male downhill mountain bike racer ever by number of wins at the time. This record has since been beaten Peat's South African teammate, Greg Minnaar.

Other successes include placing second in the Mountain Bike World Championships in 2000, 2001, 2002 and 2008. On 6 September 2009, Peat won the World Championships in Canberra for the first time in his career, with a winning time of 2:30.33, just 0.05 seconds ahead of his Santa Cruz teammate Greg Minnaar. He was crowned World Cup champion in 2002, 2004 and 2006. He has also won the Lisboa Downhill, held in Lisbon, Portugal, eight times.

Aside from his professional riding career, Peat has other involvements with the sport, including contributing to the design and manufacture of specialist riding clothing made by Royal Racing of which he is part owner. Peat also has involvements with young cyclist academies, and is a proponent of youth involvement in the sport.

Following his recent world champ status he has released his own game 'Steve Peat – Downhill Mountain Biking' for the iPhone, iPad and iPod Touch.

In recognition of his accomplishments, Peat was added to Sheffield's 'walk of fame' outside Sheffield Town Hall in 2016. In 2020, Sheffield-based publisher Vertebrate announced they would be releasing Peat's biography in October 2021.

== Races (incomplete) ==
1998
1st DH, UCI Mountain Bike World Cup, Snoqualmie, United States

1999
9th (United Kingdom) DH, British National Mountain Biking Championships

2000
10th (United Kingdom) DH, British National Mountain Biking Championships

2001
1st DH, UCI Mountain Bike World Cup, Round 1, Maribor, Slovenia
1st DH, UCI Mountain Bike World Cup, Round 2, Vars, France

2002
5th (United Kingdom) DH, British National Mountain Biking Championships
1st DH, UCI Mountain Bike World Cup, Series Overall

2003
1st (United Kingdom) DH, British National Mountain Biking Championships

2004
1st DH, UCI Mountain Bike World Cup, Round 2, Oisans (Les Deux Alpes), France
1st DH, UCI Mountain Bike World Cup, Round 4, Mont-Sainte-Anne, Canada
1st (Europe) DH, European Mountain Bike Championships, Wałbrzych, Poland
1st DH, UCI Mountain Bike World Cup, Series Overall

2005
1st DH, UCI Mountain Bike World Cup, Round 1, Vigo, Spain
1st (United Kingdom) DH, British National Mountain Biking Championships
1st DH, UCI Mountain Bike World Cup, Round 8, Fort William, Scotland

2006
1st Lisboa Downtown, Lisbon, Portugal
1st DH, UCI Mountain Bike World Cup, Round 3, Willingen, Germany
1st DH, UCI Mountain Bike World Cup, Series Overall

2007
1st Lisboa Downtown, Lisbon, Portugal

2008
1st Lisboa Downtown, Lisbon, Portugal
1st (United Kingdom) DH, British National Mountain Biking Championships

2009
1st DH, UCI Mountain Bike World Cup, Round 2, La Bresse, France
1st DH, UCI Mountain Bike World Cup, Round 3, Vallnord, Andorra
1st Lisboa Downtown, Lisbon, Portugal
1st DH, UCI Mountain Bike & Trials World Championships, Canberra, Australia

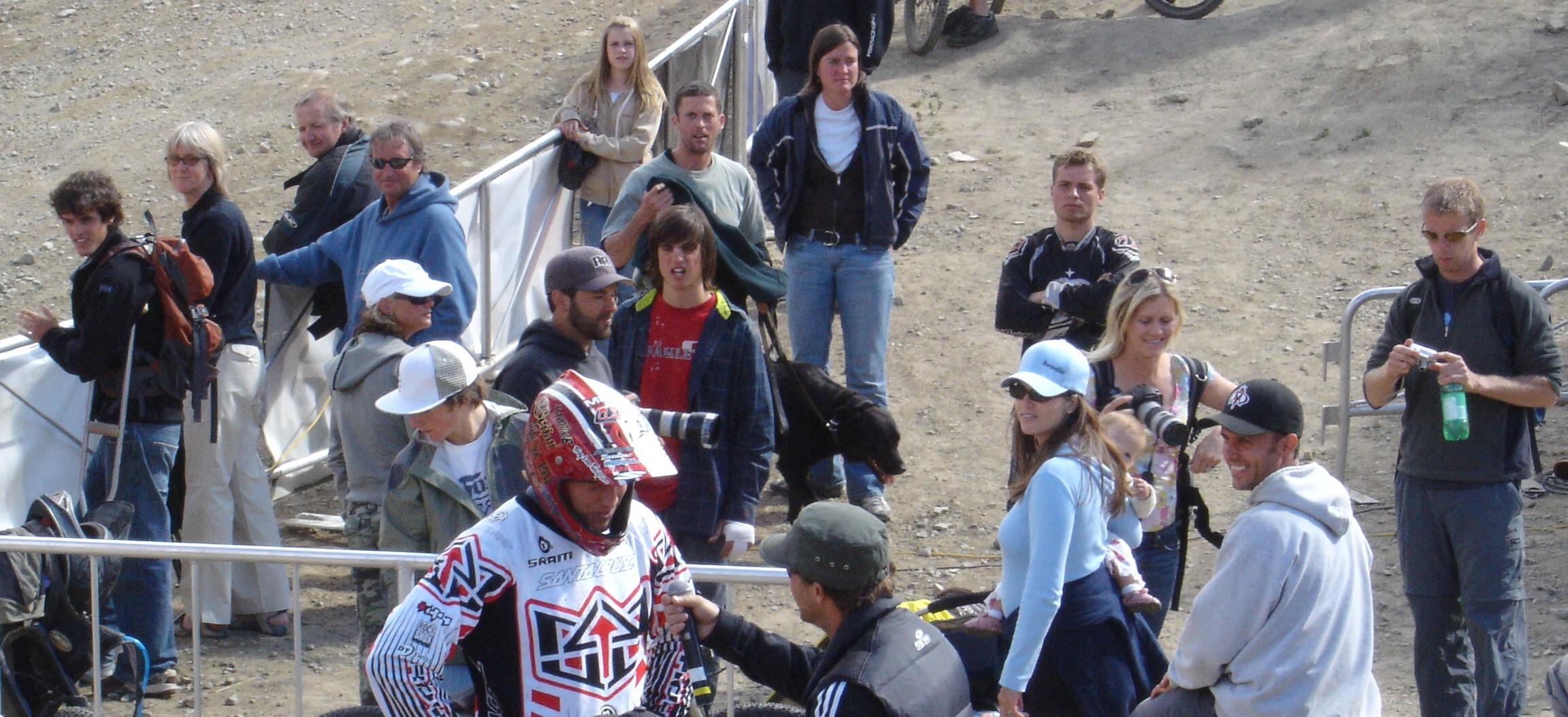
Steve Peat being interviewed after the downhill at Crankworx 2006
