= Ruth McGavigan =

Scottish mountain biker

Personal information
- Born: 25 December 1976 (age 49)

Cycling career
- Sport: Cycling
- Discipline: Mountain biking
- Role: Rider

Major wins
- 2nd, British Mountain Biking National Championships (2006)

Ruth McGavigan (born 25 December 1976) is a Scottish mountain biker.

== Life ==
She represented Scotland at the 2006 Commonwealth Games mountain bike event. She came second in the senior women category of the 2006 British Mountain Biking National Championships.
