= Mountain Biking UK =

British mountain biking magazine

- Cover of the October 2024 issue
- Editor: James Costley-White
- Categories: Sports magazine
- Frequency: Every four weeks
- Founded: 1988
- Company: Our Media
- Country: United Kingdom
- Based in: Bristol
- Language: English
- Website: www.mbuk.com
- ISSN: 0954-8696

Mountain Biking UK (often shortened to MBUK) is a British mountain biking magazine published by Our Media. It is currently the UK's best-selling mountain bike magazine, with a circulation of 18,471 (ABC: Jan – Dec 2022).

== History and profile ==
MBUK was launched in 1988 by Pacificon Limited. It was edited by Tym Manley, who remained editor until 2009. Chris Turner, M.D. and Publisher, sold the title to Future Publishing in 1991 for an undisclosed amount. In 2014, former owner Future plc sold all its sports and crafts titles to Immediate Media Company, including the MBUK title (Future later reentered mountain biking segment via its acquisition of TI Media, owner of competitor Mountain Bike Rider in 2020). In 2021, the cycling titles were moved under the umbrella of Immediate Media-owned Our Media Ltd, which in 2023 became an independent company. The current editor as of June 2025 is James Costley-White. They currently publish 13 issues a year.

MBUK covers all mountain biking disciplines; trail riding, downhill, cross-country, dirt jumping, trials, freeriding and 4X.

Since 1989, MBUK has carried the cartoon strip, Mint Sauce, which covers the tales of a mountain-biking sheep and his friends.

The magazine celebrated its 35th anniversary in 2023.

== Team MBUK ==
Along with co-sponsors such as Nike, Santa Cruz and Fox Racing, the magazine operated a professional mountain bike team from the mid-1990s until the mid-2000s. The team included riders such as Steve Peat, Scott Beaumont, Rob Warner, and Will Longden, competing in the UCI Mountain Bike World Cup.
