= Danny Hart (cyclist) =

British downhill mountain biker (born 1991)

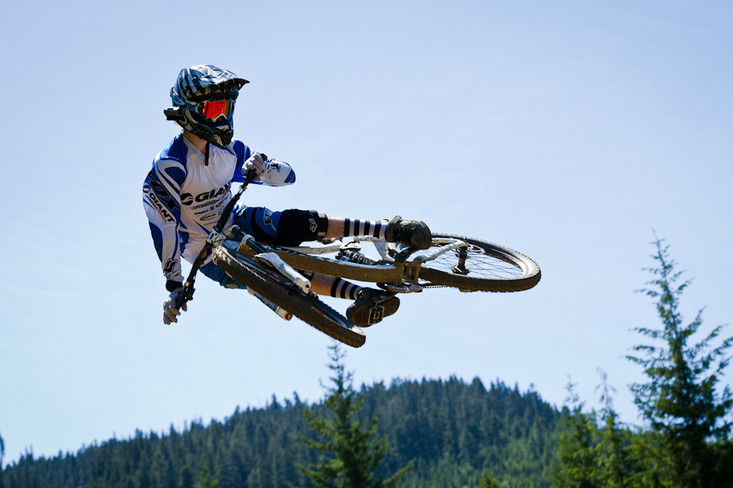
- Danny Hart, pulling a giant whip off a jump

Personal information
- Nickname: Redcar Rocket
- Born: 20 September 1991 (age 35) Redcar, England
- Height: 5 ft 10 in (178 cm)

Cycling career
- Sport: Cycling
- Current team: Norco Race Division
- Discipline: MTB
- Role: Rider
- Rider type: DH

Major wins
- Maxxis Cup International #1 – Gouveia
Medal record
Representing Great Britain
Men's Mountain biking
World Championships
| Gold medal – first place | 2011 Champery | Downhill |
| Gold medal – first place | 2016 Val di Sole | Downhill |
| Bronze medal – third place | 2009 Canberra | Downhill (junior) |
| Bronze medal – third place | 2018 Lenzerheide | Downhill |

Danny Hart (born 20 September 1991) is a British downhill mountain biker who currently rides for Norco Race Division He won the 2011 and 2016 UCI Mountain Bike World Championships.

== Career ==
Hart was educated at Rye Hills School in Redcar. He had received financial support from Redcar and Cleveland Young People's Trust as a junior rider. In October 2011, after winning the World Championships, Hart and former Olympic triple-jumper Jonathan Edwards and world paratriathlete Charlotte Ellis helped launch a £31m project to build a leisure centre in Redcar.

Hart won the 2007 youth national championship at Rheola, Wales in conditions he described as 'really terrible'. In 2008, when 16, he began competing the elite class internationally, with a best DH World Cup result of 22nd at Vallnord, Andorra in June. In 2009 he won the Maxxis Cup in Vigo, Spain, and came second in the junior national championship at Innerleithen, Scotland, third at the junior world championship in Canberra, Australia and 20th in the Elite class at the Fort William, Scotland round of the World Cup in June of that year.

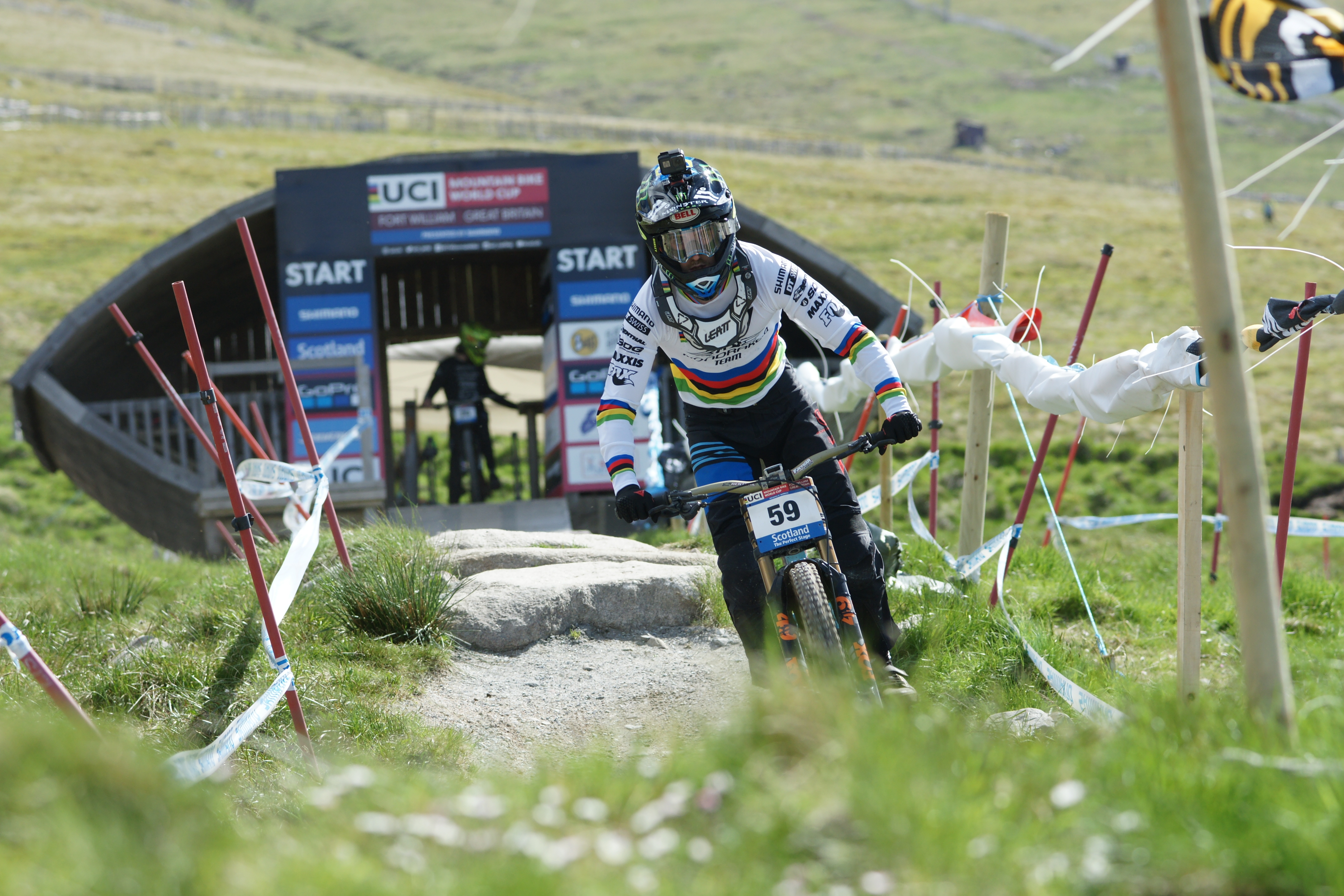
Danny Hart leaving the start gate at the 2017 UCI Downhill World Cup at Fort William

== Major results ==
2011
1st UCI World Downhill Championships
4th Overall UCI Downhill World Cup

2nd Fort William
2nd Val di Sole

2012
7th Overall UCI Downhill World Cup

2nd Fort William
3rd Mont Sainte-Anne

2013
9th Overall UCI Downhill World Cup

2nd Hafjell

2014
1st Red Bull Hardline
8th Overall UCI Downhill World Cup

3rd Fort William
3rd Mont Sainte-Anne

2015
1st National Downhill Championships
2016
1st UCI World Downhill Championships
2nd National Downhill Championships
2nd Overall UCI Downhill World Cup

1st Lenzerheide
1st Mont Sainte-Anne
1st Vallnord
3rd Lourdes
3rd Fort William

2017
3rd National Downhill Championships
6th Overall UCI Downhill World Cup

3rd Vallnord
3rd Lenzerheide
3rd Mont Sainte-Anne

2018
2nd National Downhill Championships
2nd Overall UCI Downhill World Cup

3rd Val di Sole
3rd Mont Sainte-Anne

2019
1st National Downhill Championships
4th Overall UCI Downhill World Cup

1st Snowshoe
2nd Maribor

2021
3rd National Downhill Championships
