= Liam Killeen =

English cyclist (born 1982)

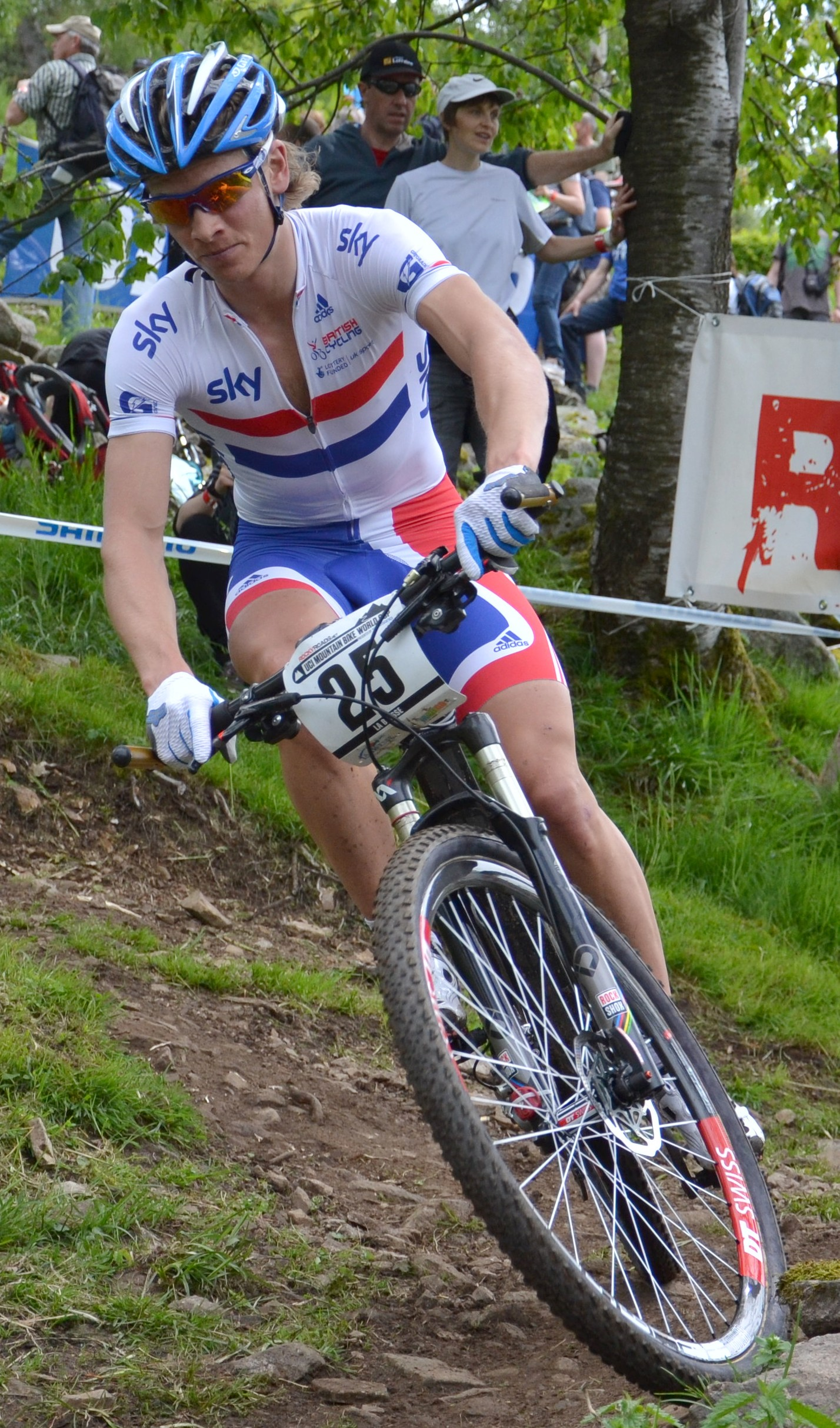

Personal information
- Full name: Liam Killeen
- Nickname: Killa
- Born: 12 April 1982 (age 44) Malvern, Worcestershire, England, UK
- Height: 1.73 m (5 ft 8 in)
- Weight: 66 kg (146 lb)

Cycling career
- Sport: Cycling
- Current team: Specialized Racing
- Disciplines: MTB & Cyclo-cross
- Role: Rider
- Rider type: XC & Cyclo-cross

Professional teams
- 2005–2008: Specialized
- 2009–2011: Trek World Racing
- 2012–: Giant Factory Off-Road Team

Major wins
- British Mountain Biking National Champion 2008, 2009, 2010, 2011; Commonwealth Games 2006; British Cyclo-cross National Champion (2016)
Medal record
Men's mountain bike racing
Representing Great Britain
World Championships
Silver medal – second place	2004 Les Gets	Under-23 cross-country
Representing England
Commonwealth Games
Gold medal – first place	2006 Melbourne	Cross-country
Bronze medal – third place	2002 Manchester	Cross-country

Liam Killeen (born 12 April 1982), is a British professional mountain biker. He represented England in cross country racing at the Commonwealth Games in 2002 where he came 3rd, and became Commonwealth Champion in 2006. He has won the British Mountain Biking National Champion over five consecutive years; 2008, 2009, 2010, 2011 and 2012. He competed for Great Britain at the 2004 and 2008 Summer Olympics and was chosen as the sole male cross-country rider for the British team for the London Games in 2012.

== Early life ==
Killeen had been interested in cycling from a young age, but a trip to the Malvern Classic introduced him to cross-country cycling when he was about thirteen. He had previously been interested in motocross.

== Career ==
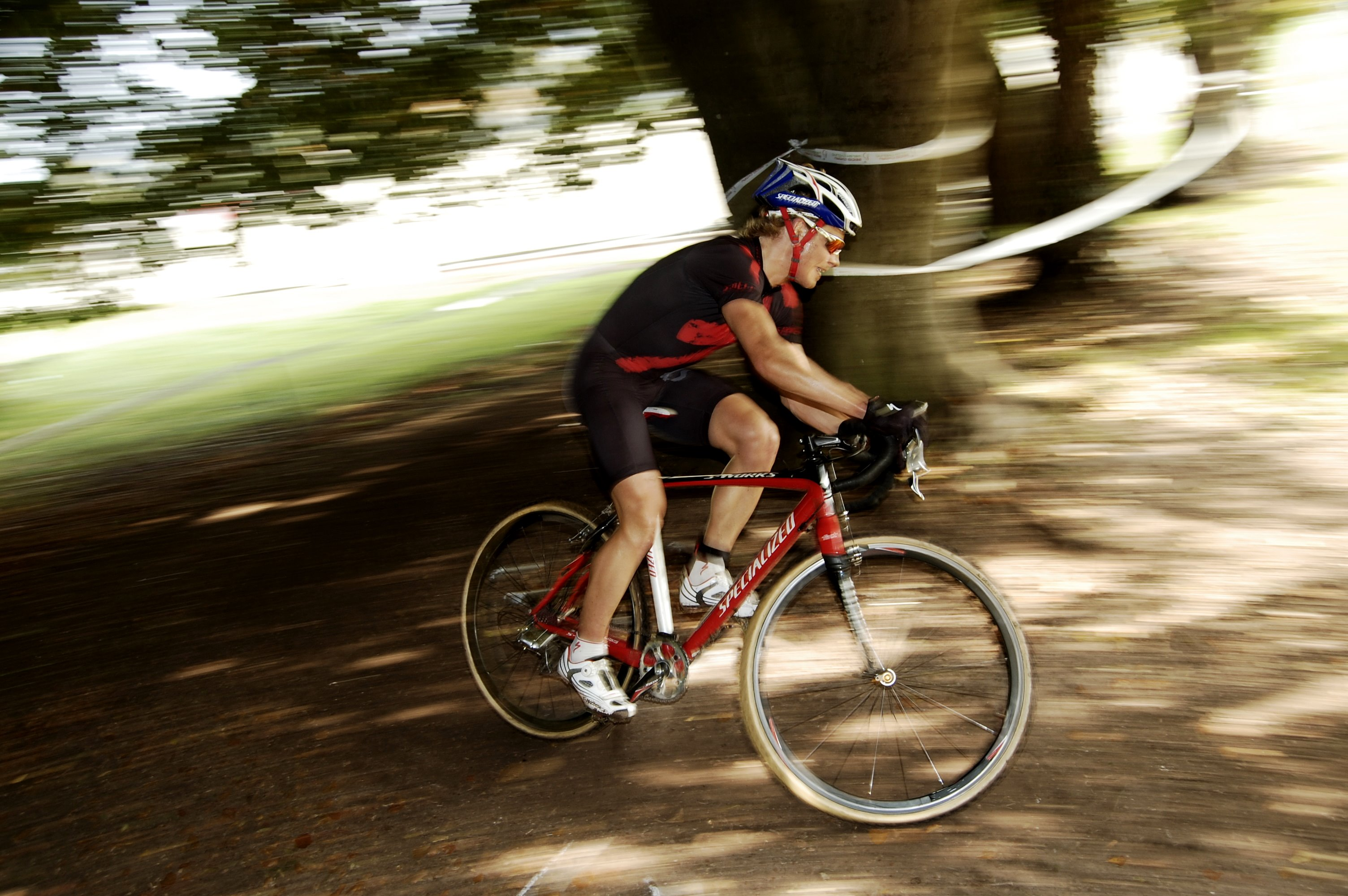
Killeen competing in the British Cycling National Trophy, 2010

Having won multiple titles both at the junior and Under-23 levels, he competed at the 2002 Commonwealth Games in Manchester, where he took the bronze medal. Despite having won his first major medal at the international level, he continued to compete in Under-23 events, winning the silver medal at the Under-23 World Championship in 2004.

Prior to the 2004 Summer Olympics, he won the test event on the Olympic track in Greece. Competing in the Games themselves for the British team, he was held up by a crash early on in the race and ended up finishing in fifth place, outside of the medal spots.

He returned to the English team at the 2006 Commonwealth Games in Melbourne, Australia. Having placed third at the previous Games, he went two places better, taking the gold medal for his country. In 2007, he suffered from chronic fatigue syndrome and could not compete for an entire season.

He competed once more for the British team at the 2008 Summer Olympics in Beijing, and was considered one of the favourites for the gold medal. Only 150 metres (490 ft) into the race, his handlebars clipped a race marker, flipping him over the bars and off the bike. This left him in last place chasing the rest of the pack, but he managed to move up to seventh place by the finish. He did not get the chance to defend his gold medal at the 2010 Commonwealth Games as mountain biking had been dropped from the games, replaced by archery in the schedule. He considered a switch to road racing to take part in the Games.

He was selected as part of the British team to compete at the 2012 Summer Olympics in London, where he hoped to achieve a podium finish, but crashed out on the second lap of the race. He was the only athlete competing for Britain in the men's cross country. As part of his training, he conducted practice runs at the Olympic track near Southend.

He competed at the 2014 Commonwealth Games, finishing in 6th place.

== Major results ==
=== Mountain Bike ===
2002
1st National Under-23 XC Championships
2003
1st Overall UCI Under-23 XC World Cup
1st Evathlon
1st Roc d'Azur
1st European Cup No. 2
1st UK National Point Series
1st European Cup No. 1
2004
1st National Under-23 XC Championships
1st Overall UCI Under-23 XC World Cup
1st NORBA Pro Men's XC, Mount Snow, Vermont (USA)
5th Cross-country, Olympic Games
2005
1st NPS XC #5 – Sherwood Pines (GBR)
1st NORBA XC #4 – Schweitzer Mtn (USA)
1st Firecracker 50 Marathon – Breckenridge (USA)
1st World Cup MX #3 – Mt Sainte Anne (CAN)
2006
1st Cross-country, Commonwealth Games
British National Series XC No. 4 (GBR) – 1st
2008
1st NORBA Marathon #2 – Nova (USA)
1st National XC Championships
7th Cross-country, Olympic Games
2009
1st National XC Championships
National XC Series

1st Crow Hill
1st Margam Park

2010
1st National XC Championships
National XC Series

1st Dalby Forest
1st Wasing Park
2nd Margam Park

2011
1st National XC Championships
National XC Series

1st Wasing Park
1st Newnham Park

2012
1st National XC Championships
National XC Series

1st Sherwood Pines
1st Dalby Forest

2014
2nd National XC Championships
National XC Series

2nd Cannock Chase

2015
National XC Series

1st Cannock Chase
2nd Builth Wells

2016
National XC Series

1st Newnham Park
1st Builth Wells
2nd Pembrey Country Park

3rd National XC Championships

=== Cyclo-cross ===
2004
1st National Under-23 CX Championships
2016
1st National CX Championships
