= Oli Beckingsale =

English cyclist (born 1976)

Personal information
- Full name: Oliver James Beckingsale
- Born: 7 June 1976 (age 50) England; Great Britain

Cycling career
- Sport: Cycling
- Discipline: MTB
- Role: Rider
- Rider type: XC

Oliver James Beckingsale (born 7 June 1976 in Backwell, Bristol), is an ex-professional mountain biker. He represented Britain at the Olympic Games in 2000, 2004 and 2008, and England at the Commonwealth Games in 2002 and 2006. He retired from professional cycling in 2013.

== Major results ==
2001
1st National XC Championships
2002
1st National XC Championships
2005
1st National XC Championships
6th UEC European XC Championships
9th UCI World XC Championships
2006
1st National XC Championships
1st British National Points Series
2nd Cross-country, Commonwealth Games
