= Ruby Miller (cyclist) =

Welsh cyclist

Personal information
- Full name: Ruby May Miller
- Born: 17 August 1992 (age 34) Wales; United Kingdom

Cycling career
- Sport: Cycling
- Current team: Trek
- Disciplines: Road, Mountain biking, Cyclo-cross
- Role: Rider
- Rider type: All-rounder

Amateur teams
- –January 2008: Maindy Flyers
- 2008: Lifeforce Development team
- 2009–2010: Forza Cycles
- 2011: Horizon Fitness
- 2012-: TORQ Performance

Ruby Miller (born August 1992) is a Welsh racing cyclist from Llantwit Major.

She began competing as a triathlete at the age of 10 as her mother was a coach with the Maindy Triathlon club in Cardiff. Miller then began cycling with the Maindy Flyers youth cycling club and was spotted at a cyclo-cross event and selected to ride for the British Cycling's Wales talent team.

She raced in the Netherlands in 2007, representing Wales in the Interland track competition. Miller is currently sponsored and riding for Trek.

During the 2008-2009 Track Cycling season Ruby competed in the Revolution Future Stars Series at the Manchester Velodrome. She took a number of race victories throughout the season and won the series overall in February 2009, defeating Laura Trott.

Miller competed for the Threads.com/DFT team in the team pursuit in the UCI Track Cycling World Cup Classics event at Manchester Velodrome in February 2011.

Miller participated as a torchbearer for the 2012 Summer Olympics torch relay.

She is currently studying occupational therapy at Cardiff University.

== Major results ==
2007
1st Overall National Youth CX Trophy Series

1st Mallory Park
1st Bradford
1st Derby
2nd Ipswich
4th Abergavenny

1st Welsh Youth Duathlon Championships
2008
1st National Youth CX Championships
1st Cross-country, National Youth MTB Championships
1st Welsh Youth Duathlon Championships
National Under-16 Track Championships

2nd Individual pursuit
2nd Points race
2nd Scratch
3rd 500m TT

3rd British Youth Duathlon Championships
4th Points race, National Track Championships
2009
1st Scratch, National Junior Track Championships
1st Cross-country, National Junior MTB Championships
1st Revolution Track Cycling Future Stars Series – Under 16
2010
National CX Trophy Series

1st Ipswich
3rd Rutland
5th Bradford

Welsh CX League

1st Penperlleni

2nd Welsh CX Championships
National Track Championships

4th Points race
4th Scratch
5th Madison (with Corrine Hall)

4th 50 km, Big Welsh Weekend Enduro
5th Points race, National Junior Track Championships
2011
1st BUCS CX Championships
1st Stage 1 (TTT) Two Days of Bedford
Welsh CX League

1st Cardiff
2nd Talgarth

BUCS Track Championships

2nd Individual pursuit
2nd 500m TT

2nd JIF Summer Crit
3rd Tywyn Criterium
3rd Cross-country, BUCS MTB Championships
5th Cross-country, National Under-23 MTB Championships
2012
Welsh CX League

1st Haverfordwest
1st Carmarthen Park

2nd Cross-country, BUCS MTB Championships
Southern MTB Series

3rd Frith Hill

2013
Welsh MTB Series

2nd Coed-y-Brenin Forest Park

4th Cross-country, National Under-23 MTB Championships
2014
2nd Cross-country, Welsh MTB Championships
Southern MTB Series

4th Queen Elizabeth Country Park

Welsh MTB XC Series

4th Caerphilly
5th Builth Wells

2015
1st Welsh National Criterium Championships
2021
National CX Trophy Series

5th Sunderland

2022
National CX Trophy Series

5th South Shields

2023
2nd Overall National CX Trophy Series

2nd Derby
2nd Paignton
3rd South Shields
5th Thornton in Craven
