= Paul Lasenby =

English mountain biker (born 1975)

Personal information
- Full name: Paul Lasenby
- Born: 1975 (age 50–51) Buckinghamshire, England

Cycling career
- Sport: Cycling
- Discipline: MTB
- Role: Rider
- Rider type: XC

Amateur team
- 2008: High Wycombe Cycling Club

Professional teams
- 2003: Lazy-Boyz
- 2005: Marin UK

Paul Lasenby (born 1975 in Buckinghamshire) is an English former professional mountain biker. Lasenby was the first person to win a national cross country title on a dual suspension mountain bike.

== Major results ==
1996
1st British National Points Series
1997
1st National XC Championships
1999
1st National XC Championships
