= Liz Scalia =

Italian cyclist

Elizabeth Scalia
Personal information
- Full name: Elizabeth Scalia

Cycling career
- Sport: Cycling
- Discipline: MTB
- Role: Rider
- Rider type: Marathon

Professional team
- 2005–2007: Team Bikes Ragusa

Major wins
- 2007 Marathon National Champion

Elizabeth Scalia is a British-Italian professional racing cyclist, specializing in marathon mountain bike racing, and was the women's marathon national champion in 2007. She is based in Italy and has represented Great Britain in several international events including World Cups and World Championships.

== Achievements ==
2006
2nd Marathon, British National Mountain Biking Championships
1st Trek Marathon Series, Round 1, Margam Park
2nd Trek Marathon Series, Round 3, Plymouth
12th Marathon, UCI Mountain Bike World Championships

2007
1st (United Kingdom) Marathon, British National Mountain Biking Championships
3rd Trek Marathon Series, Round 1, Thetford
4th Trek Marathon Series, Round 2, Sherwood
3rd Trek Marathon Series, Round 3, Margam Park
1st Trek Marathon Series, Round 4, Newnham Park

2008
2nd Marathon, British National Mountain Biking Championships, Margam Park
