= David Baker (cyclist) =

English cyclist

Personal information
- Nickname: Baxter
- Born: 30 December 1965 (age 60) England; United Kingdom

Cycling career
- Sport: Cycling
- Current team: Retired
- Disciplines: Cyclo-cross & MTB
- Role: Rider
- Rider type: Cyclo-cross, XC MTB

Amateur teams
- Ace Racing Team
- Norton Wheelers

Professional teams
- 1987-1990: Ace RT Peugeot Cycles
- 1991-1994: Team Raleigh
- 1995-1998: GT Bicycles
Medal record
Representing United Kingdom
Mountain bike racing
World Championships
Bronze medal – third place	1992 Bromont	Cross-country

David Baker (born 30 December 1965) is an English former professional cyclist, who competed in cyclo-cross and mountain bike racing.

== Biography ==
Baker, from Dronfield, Derbyshire, began riding cyclo-cross with Norton Wheelers. He moved to Ace Racing Team where he and teammate Tim Gould dominated cyclo-cross for years. In the late 1980s, Baker and Gould tried small mountain bike races, progressing to Mountain Bike Club events which were then a national series. The British Mountain Bike Federation began in the early 1990s; Baker won the national series on numerous occasions, along with national championships. In 1993, he won the UK round of the Grundig Mountain Bike World Cup at Newnham Park, near Plymouth. He came 15th for Britain at the 1996 Atlanta Olympics. Two years later he retired with heart problems.

In 2009, he was inducted into the British Cycling Hall of Fame.

== Major results ==
1992
1st National XC Championships
1st Overall National Points Series
3rd UCI World XC Championships
1993
1st National XC Championships
UCI World Cup

1st Plymouth

1994
1st National XC Championships
