= James Ouchterlony =

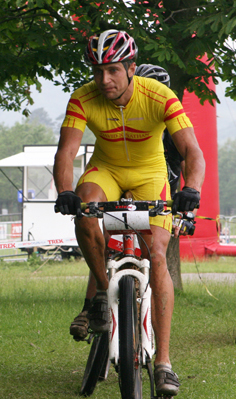
- British National MTB Marathon Champs. Margam Park, 1 June 2008

Personal information
- Full name: James Angus Heathcote Ouchterlony
- Born: 9 August 1973 (age 53)

Cycling career
- Sport: Cycling
- Discipline: MTB
- Role: Rider
- Rider type: XC/Marathon

Professional teams
- 2006: Massi-Abarth
- 2007: Team Singletrack Pipedream
- 2008: Limpiezas Victoria – Bemekis

James Ouchterlony (born 9 August 1973) is a racing cyclist specialising in marathon and cross country mountain bike racing. He represented Scotland at the 2006 Commonwealth Games. He was also the Sports Personality of the year in the Angus Sports Awards 2005.

== Major results ==
2005
2nd National Marathon Championships
3rd National XC Championships
2006
2nd National Marathon Championships
2007
1st National Marathon Championships
1st Overall, NPS Marathon
2008
6th Marathon, 2008 UCI Mountain Bike World Cup

2015

4th UCI World Championship XCO MA-40 (Vallnord)
