= David Fletcher (cyclist) =

British cyclist (born 1989)

Personal information
- Full name: David Fletcher
- Nickname: Didi
- Born: 27 February 1989 (age 37) Edwinstowe, England, United Kingdom
- Height: 183 cm (6 ft 0 in)
- Weight: 92 kg (203 lb)

Cycling career
- Sport: Cycling
- Current team: Halfords Bikehut
- Discipline: MTB
- Role: Rider
- Rider type: XC

Professional teams
- Trek "ScienceInSport"
- Halfords Bikehut

David Fletcher (born 27 February 1989, Edwinstowe, Nottinghamshire) is a British cross-country mountain biker and cyclo-cross rider and 2009 British under-23 champion.

In 2006, came 18th in the junior world championship in New Zealand and was then helped by the Olympic Development Programme.

He finished 33rd in the European championship in the Netherlands. In September 2007, Fletcher was 3rd junior in the world championships in Fort William, Scotland. Fletcher rode for ScienceinSport in 2008.

== Race results 2006/09 ==
Championship	Position
World Mountain Bike Championships 2006 (New Zealand) (junior)	18th
European Cyclo-Cross Championships 2006 (Netherlands) (Junior)	33rd
World Mountain Bike Championships 2007 (Scotland) (junior)	3rd
National Mountain Bike Championships 2008 (U 23)	1st
World Mountain Bike Championships 2008 (Italy) (U23)	57th
National Cyclo-Cross Championships 2009 (U 23)	1st
World Cyclo-Cross Championships 2009 (Netherlands) (U 23)	17th
