= Rob Warner (mountain biker) =

English racing cyclist

Rob Warner (born 16 November 1970) is a retired professional downhill mountain biker born in Reading, England.

Before turning professional in 1993 Warner worked for six months at the Rover plant in Oxford on a production line building the Rover 800 series car. After riding for Saracen with teammate Steve Peat and then MBUK, he signed for the Giant Bicycles Downhill Team, and remained with them until the end of 2016. He then went on to join Commencal Bikes in 2017 in the role of brand ambassador.

In 1996 he became the first ever British rider to win a round of the UCI Mountain Bike World Cup taking a historic win at Kaprun in Austria. According to Warner, in a video streamed to Pinkbike on 2 June 2014 titled The Lost Rob Warner Story, he actually won the Kaprun World Cup with an STI he picked up in Les Gets a week before.

He became the UK National Champion in 1997, 1998 and finally in 2001.

Rob Warner also appeared on a 1996 episode of You Bet!, where he raced a rally car. Despite failing to beat the car, he did get to meet and secure a small kiss from Jet from Gladiators, who was co-hosting the show.

Aside from competition, Warner has turned his hand to television, presenting the Red Bull 2007 X Fighters Freestyle Motocross events with Ed Leigh.

For the last two seasons he has also presented commentary on World Cup and World Championship downhill rounds with Claudio Caluori and the World Cup Cross Country (XCC & XCO) with Dutch 1996 Olympic Champion, Bart Brentjens.

In 2019, Warner released a series of videos on Red Bull TV following his journey through several riding destinations, joined by mountain biking riders Matt Jones, Olly Wilkins, and Finn Iles. The countries visited include New Zealand, Kenya, Lesotho, Ecuador, Nepal and Colombia.
