= Simon Richardson (English cyclist) =

British racing cyclist

Personal information
- Full name: Simon Richardson
- Born: 21 June 1983 (age 43) England; United Kingdom
- Height: 184 cm (6 ft 0 in)
- Weight: 75 kg (165 lb)

Cycling career
- Sport: Cycling
- Current team: Retired
- Disciplines: Road & XC MTB
- Role: Rider
- Rider type: All rounder

Professional teams
- 2007–2008: Plowman Craven-Evans Cycles
- 2009: Rapha Condor
- 2010–2012: Sigma Sport–Specialized

Simon Richardson (born 21 June 1983) is a retired professional road racing cyclist from Bristol who last rode for Team IG–Sigma Sport. He moved into media work after retiring and currently works as a presenter for Global Cycling Network.

== Racing career ==
He started as a cross-country mountain biker and won the 2005 under-23 British National Mountain Biking Championships before switching to road racing with Plowman Craven-Evans Cycles in 2007.

Richardson was the general classification winner of the 2009 FBD Insurance Rás, his only overall victory in a professional stage race. Also known as Rás Tailteann, the event comprised eight stages and was part of the UCI Europe Tour. Riding for Rapha Condor, he took the lead after stage three and held it to the end of the race, taking the overall win by two minutes and forty-nine seconds.

His other professional win came at the same race in 2008, beating David O'Loughlin in the sprint to the line on stage five after the two riders broke clear of the field. He would finish the race in 19th place overall.

He had top-twenty overall finishes at the Tour of Britain in 2008 and 2010, and came 5th in the elite men's road race at the 2010 British National Road Race Championships. He also scored podium finishes in uncategorized races including Tour of the Reservoir, Sea Otter Classic and Lincoln Grand Prix.

Richardson announced his retirement from professional cycling at the end of 2012 after winning the Rouleur’s Combativity award on the final stage of the Tour Of Britain.

== Post-retirement ==
Following his retirement, Richardson became a presenter and content creator at Global Cycling Network. He works alongside former IG-Sigma teammate Daniel Lloyd, Conor Dunne and other former professional cyclists at GCN.

In 2024, Richardson filmed a feature for GCN in which he competed in the Brompton World Championship. Competitors at the event ride Brompton folding bicycles and must wear some element of business attire - in Richardson's case a suit jacket - rather than traditional cycling gear. He finished second in his heat to qualify for the final, and was second in the championship race.

== Major results ==
2004
1st Round of Belgian Cup
2nd National Under-23 CX Championships
2005
1st National Under-23 XC Championships
2006
1st Bikeline 2 Day
2008
1st Stage 5 FBD Insurance Rás
2nd Sea Otter Classic
3rd Lincoln Grand Prix
3rd Richmond Grand Prix
3rd Overall Girvan Stage Race
3rd Overall Tour of the Reservoir
2009
1st Overall FBD Insurance Rás
2010
1st Tour of the Reservoir
2024
2nd Brompton World Championship
