= Caroline Alexander =

Scottish cyclist

Personal information
- Full name: Caroline Alexander
- Born: 3 March 1968 (age 58) Barrow in Furness, Lancashire, United Kingdom

Cycling career
- Sport: Cycling
- Disciplines: Road & MTB XC
- Role: Rider

Professional teams
- 1991: Kona
- 1992: Raleigh
- 1993: Louis Garneau
- 1996: BMW-Klein
- 1998: Team Ritchey
- 1999: American Eagle
- 2001: Specialized MTB
Medal record
Women's mountain bike racing
Representing Great Britain
European Championships
Gold medal – first place	1995 Špindlerův	Cross country
Silver medal – second place	1991 La Bourboule	Cross country
Bronze medal – third place	2000 Rhenen	Cross country

Caroline Sarah J. Alexander (born 3 March 1968) is a cross-country mountain biker and road cyclist born in Barrow-in-Furness. She was a swimmer as a child and did not cycle until she was 20. She first rode a bike in competition in a triathlon: she came second in the swimming and was fastest on the bike. She entered her first mountain bike race, which she won. Within a year she was one of the top three mountain-bike racers in the UK. She left her job as a draughtswoman in Barrow shipyards and became a full-time cyclist.

She represented Britain at the 1996 Summer Olympics in Atlanta and the 2000 Summer Olympics in Sydney. She was a reserve for the British Cycling team at the 2001 UCI road world championships Alexander also represented Britain at the UCI Women's Road World Cup events in 2002. Alexander represented Scotland in the first mountain-bike event in the Commonwealth Games in 2002.

She was the first British female mountain biker to win a UCI World Cup stage in 1997.

Alexander retired from cycling in 2004. In 2009, she was inducted into the British Cycling Hall of Fame.

== Major results ==
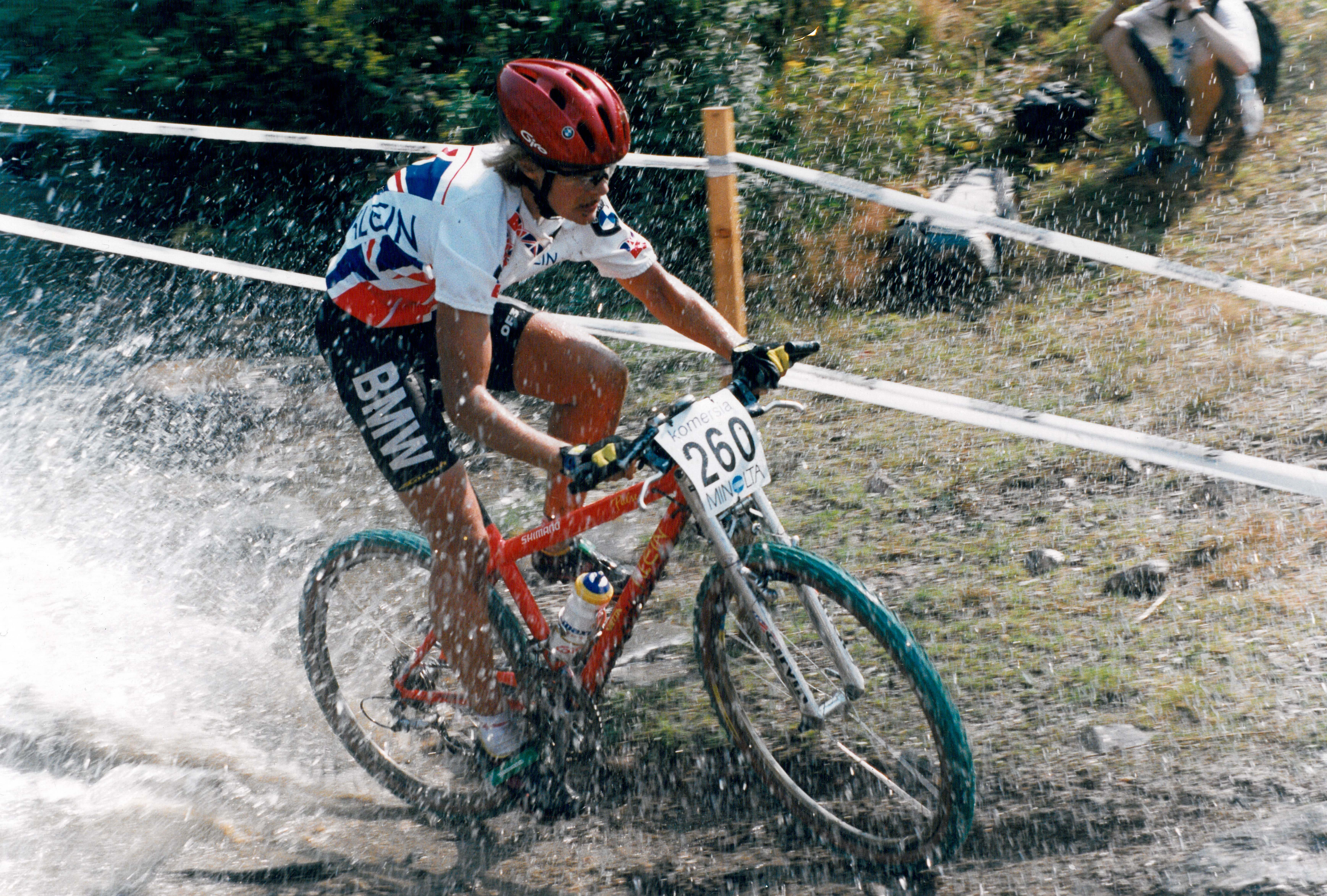
Alexander at the European Mountain Bike Championships in Špindlerův Mlýn in 1995.

1993
1st National XC Championships
2nd UEC European XC Championships
1994
1st National XC Championships
2nd Overall UCI XC World Cup
1995
1st UEC European XC Championships
1st National XC Championships
1996
1st Overall Mountain Bike Tour of Britain

1st 6 Stages

UCI XC World Cup

2nd Bromont
3rd Helen

1997
1st National XC Championships
UCI XC World Cup

1st Sankt Wendel
2nd Špindlerův Mlýn

1998
1st National CX Championships
2000
1st Stage 3 Redlands Bicycle Classic
2nd Road race, National Road Championships
2nd Sea Otter TT
2001
1st Overall Sea Otter Classic
2nd Overall UCI XC World Cup

2nd Mont-Sainte-Anne
3rd Durango

6th UCI World XC Championships
2002
1st National XC Championships
UCI XC World Cup

2nd Houffalize

5th Cross-country, Commonwealth Games
7th La Flèche Wallonne
