= British National Cyclo-cross Championships =

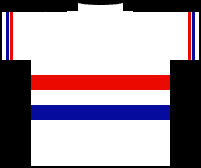
The Champion's Jersey

The British National Cyclo-cross Championships are held annually. The winners of each event are awarded with a symbolic white cycling jersey featuring blue and red stripes, which can be worn by the rider at other cyclo-cross events in the country to show their status as national champion. The champion's stripes can be combined into a sponsored rider's team kit design for this purpose.

== Men ==
=== Elite ===
Year	Gold	Silver	Bronze		
1955 - Seniors	Alan Jackson (Independent)	Alan Winters (Independent)	Don Stone	Welwyn Garden City	
1956 - Seniors	Alan Jackson (Independent)	Don Smith	Mick Weston	Halesowen	
1957 - Seniors	Don Stone (Independent)	Alan Jackson	Paddy Hoban	Brands Hatch	
1958 - Seniors	Don Stone (Independent)	Barry Spence	Bill Radford	Bagshot Heath	
1959 - Seniors	Barry Spence	Alan Winters	Ken Knapman	Barrow Bridge, Bolton	
1960 - Seniors	David Briggs	Don Stone	Alan Winters	Baddesley	
1961 - Seniors	John Atkins	Mike Wilkinson	David Briggs	Chobham	
1962 - Seniors	John Atkins	Mike Wilkinson	Keith Mernickle	Tingley	
1963 - Seniors	Mick Stallard	John Atkins	Keith Mernickle	Harlow	
1964 - Seniors	Mick Stallard	Keith Mernickle	Mick Ives	Wolverhampton	
1965 - Seniors	Mick Stallard	Keith Mernickle	Harry Bond	Leeds	
1966 - Seniors	John Atkins	Roger Page	Dave Wren	Birmingham	
1967 - Pros	Keith Mernickle	Mick Ives	George Halls	Featherstone	
1967 - Amateurs	John Atkins	Dave Wren	John Barnes	Birmingham	
1968 - Pros	Mick Ives	Dick Goodman	Keith Mernickle	Croydon	
1968 - Amateurs	John Atkins	Roger Page	Dave Wren	Crystal Palace	
1969 - Pros	John Atkins	Keith Mernickle	Mick Ives	Coventry	
1969 - Amateurs	Barry Moss	Roger Page	Eric Stone	Coventry	
1970 - Pros	John Atkins	Keith Mernickle	Eric Stone	Crystal Palace	
1970 - Amateurs	Ollie Nagle	Daryl Brassington	Roger Page	Crystal Palace	
1971 - Pros	John Atkins (1st overall)	Eric Stone (3rd)	Keith Mernickle (7th)	Manchester (Heaton Park)	
1971 - Amateurs	Daryl Brassington (2nd overall)	Roger Page (4th)	Chris Dodd	combined	
1972 - Pros	John Atkins (1st overall)	Daryl Brassington (2nd)	Keith Mernickle (3rd)	Leeds	
1972 - Amateurs	Chris Dodd (4th)	Roger Page (5th)	Vic Barnett (7th)	combined	
1973 - Pros	John Atkins (1st overall)	Keith Mernickle (2nd)	Eric Stone (3rd)	Sutton Coldfield	
1973 - Amateurs	Chris Dodd (6th)	Graham Collyer (8th)	Richard Travis (9th)	combined	
1974 - Pros	John Atkins (2nd)	Daryl Brassington (3rd)	Keith Mernickle (4th)	Liverpool	
1974 - Amateurs	Jeff Morris (1st overall)	Chris Dodd (5th)	Alan Williams (6th)	combined	
1975 - Pros	John Atkins (2nd)	Keith Mernickle (3rd)	Barry Davies (4th)	Sutton Coldfield	
1975 - Amateurs	Jeff Morris (1st overall)	Chris Dodd (6th)	Phil Allison (8th)	combined	
1976 - Pros	Keith Mernickle (1st overall)	John Atkins (3rd)	Chris Dodd (4th)	Sutton Coldfield	
1976 - Amateurs	Jeff Morris (2nd)	Phil Allison (5th)	Tony Lyne (6th)	combined	
1977 - Seniors	John Atkins (pro)	Keith Mernickle (pro)	Ian Jewell (pro)	Sutton Coldfield	
1978 - Seniors	Chris Wreghitt (amateur)	John Atkins (pro)	Eric Stone (pro)	Sutton Coldfield	3rd pro Keith Mernickle (4th), 2nd amateur Chris Dodd (5th), 3rd amateur Phil Allison (6th)
1979 - Seniors	Chris Wreghitt (amateur)	Phil Allison (amateur)	Eric Stone (pro)	Sutton Coldfield	2nd pro John Atkins, 3rd pro Keith Mernickle, 3rd amateur Chris Dodd
1980 - Seniors	Chris Wreghitt (amateur)	Eric Stone (pro)	Peter Brookes (amateur)	Sutton Coldfield	2nd pro Chris Dodd (5th), 3rd amateur Paul Watson (4th)
1981	Chris Wreghitt	Chris Ledger	Eric Stone	Sutton Coldfield	
1982	Chris Wreghitt			Sutton Coldfield	
1983	Steve Douce	Chris Wreghitt	Chris Young	Sutton Coldfield	
1984	Chris Young	Steve Douce		Sutton Coldfield	
1985	Steve Douce	Chris Young		Sutton Coldfield	
1986	Steve Douce	Chris Young		Sutton Coldfield	
1987	Steve Douce	Tim Gould		Sutton Coldfield	
1988	Steve Douce	Tim Gould	Chris Young	Sutton Coldfield	
1989	Steve Douce	Barrie Clarke	Tim Gould	Sutton Coldfield	
1991	Chris Young	Steve Douce			
1993	Steve Douce	David Baker	Peter Stevenson	Wolverhampton	
1994	Roger Hammond	Nick Craig	Steve Douce	Southampton	
1995	Barrie Clarke	Steve Douce	Nick Craig	Sutton Coldfield	
1996	Nick Craig	Barrie Clarke	Roger Hammond	Sutton Coldfield	
1997	Barrie Clarke	Steve Knight	Roger Hammond	Sutton Coldfield	
1998	Nick Craig	Barrie Clarke	Steve Knight	Sutton Coldfield	
1999	Steve Knight	Nick Craig	Barrie Clarke	Sutton Coldfield	
2000	Roger Hammond	Barrie Clarke	Carl Sturgeon	Ipswich	
2001	Roger Hammond	Steve Knight	Matthew Ellis	Sutton Coldfield	
2002	Roger Hammond	Matthew Ellis	Nick Craig		
2003	Roger Hammond	Matthew Ellis	Barrie Clarke		
2004	Roger Hammond	Nick Craig	Jody Crawforth		
2005	Nick Craig	Liam Killeen	Matthew Ellis	Abergavenny	
2006	Roger Hammond	Liam Killeen	Jody Crawforth	Sutton Coldfield	
2007	Phil Dixon	Nick Craig	Robert Jebb	Southampton	
2008	Roger Hammond	Liam Killeen	Paul Oldham	Sutton Coldfield	
2009	Jody Crawforth	Paul Oldham	Roger Hammond	Bradford	
2010	Ian Bibby	Jody Crawforth	Paul Oldham	Sutton Coldfield	
2011	Paul Oldham	Jody Crawforth	Liam Killeen	Derby	
2012	Ian Field	Liam Killeen	Jody Crawforth	Ipswich	
2013	Ian Field	Ian Bibby	David Fletcher	Bradford	
2014	Ian Field	David Fletcher	Nick Craig	Derby	
2015	Ian Field	Liam Killeen	Lewis Craven	Milton Keynes	
2016	Liam Killeen	Ian Field	Jack Clarkson	Shrewsbury	
2017	Ian Field	Liam Killeen	Paul Oldham	Bradford	
2018	Grant Ferguson	Ian Field	Liam Killeen	Houghton le Spring	
2019	Tom Pidcock	Ben Turner	Thomas Mein	Gravesend	
2020	Tom Pidcock	Ben Tulett	Cameron Mason	Shrewsbury	
2022	Thomas Mein	Cameron Mason	Joseph Blackmore	Crawley	
2023	Cameron Mason	Joseph Blackmore	Thomas Mein	Milnthorpe	
2024	Cameron Mason	Thomas Mein	Lewis Askey	Falkirk	
2025	Cameron Mason	Ben Chilton	Daniel Barnes	Gravesend	

=== Under 23 ===
Year	Gold	Silver	Bronze
2000	Daniel Booth	Phil Dixon	Tim Morley
2001	Liam Killeen	Tim Morley	Shaun Snodden
2002	Phil Dixon	Liam Killeen	Daniel Booth
2003	Shaun Snodden	Liam Killeen	Steven Roach
2004	Liam Killeen	Simon Richardson	Chris Skinner
2005	Philip Spencer	Ian Field	Ross Adams
2007	Ian Bibby	Ian Field	Ross Creber
2008	Ian Bibby	Ian Field	David Fletcher
2009	David Fletcher	Jonathan McEvoy	Stephen Adams
2010	Jamie Harris	Stephen Adams	David Nichols
2011	Luke Gray	David Fletcher	Billy-Joe Whenman
2012	Steve James	Kenta Gallagher	Grant Ferguson
2013	Grant Ferguson	Steve James	Ben Sumner
2014	Grant Ferguson	Kenta Gallagher	Ben Sumner
2015	Grant Ferguson	Jack Clarkson	Ben Sumner
2016	Iain Paton	Ben Wadey	Nicholas Barnes
2017	Billy Harding	Christopher Rothwell	Frazer Clacherty
2018	Tom Pidcock	Ben Turner	Daniel Tulett
2019	Tom Pidcock	Ben Turner	Thomas Mein
2020	Tom Pidcock	Ben Tulett	Cameron Mason
2022	Cameron Mason	Joseph Blackmore	Toby Barnes
2023	Cameron Mason	Joseph Blackmore	Daniel Barnes
2024	Corran Carrick-Anderson	Simon Wyllie	Daniel Barnes
2025	Ben Chilton	Ben Askey	Luke Gibson

=== Junior ===
Year	Gold	Silver	Bronze
2001	Philip Spencer	Jordan Aveyard	Craig Cooke
2002	Steven Roach	Sammy Cotton	Craig Cooke
2003	Ian Bibby	Alex Atkins	Ben Crawforth
2004	Ian Bibby	Alex Atkins	Ian Legg
2005	Alex Atkins	Paul Cox	Tom Last
2006	David Fletcher	Stephen Adams	Tom Last
2007	Alex Paton	Scott Thwaites	Jonathan McEvoy
2008	Alex Paton	Andrew Williams	Hamish Creber
2009	Thomas Moses	Sam Harrison	Daniel McLay
2010	Luke Gray	Tom Moses	Kenta Gallagher
2011	Hugo Robinson	Grant Ferguson	Luke Grivell-Mellor
2012	Hugo Robinson	Alex Welburn	Joe Moses
2013	Billy Harding	Jack Ravenscroft	Harry Franklin
2014	Thomas Craig	Dylan Kerfoot-Robson	Jack Ravenscroft
2015	Thomas Craig	Alfie Moses	Mark McGuire
2016	Mark Donovan	Harry Yates	William Gascoyne
2017	Tom Pidcock	Ben Turner	Daniel Tulett
2018	Sean Flynn	Ben Tulett	Jenson Young
2019	Ben Tulett	Lewis Askey	Jenson Young
2020	Rory McGuire	Oliver Stockwell	Corran Carrick-Anderson
2022	Joseph Smith	Ben Askey	Max Greensill
2023	Sebastian Grindley	Oliver Peace	Jacob Bush
2024	Oscar Amey	Sebastian Grindley	Alfie Amey
2025	Oscar Amey	Milo Wills	Declan Oldham

== Women ==
=== Elite ===
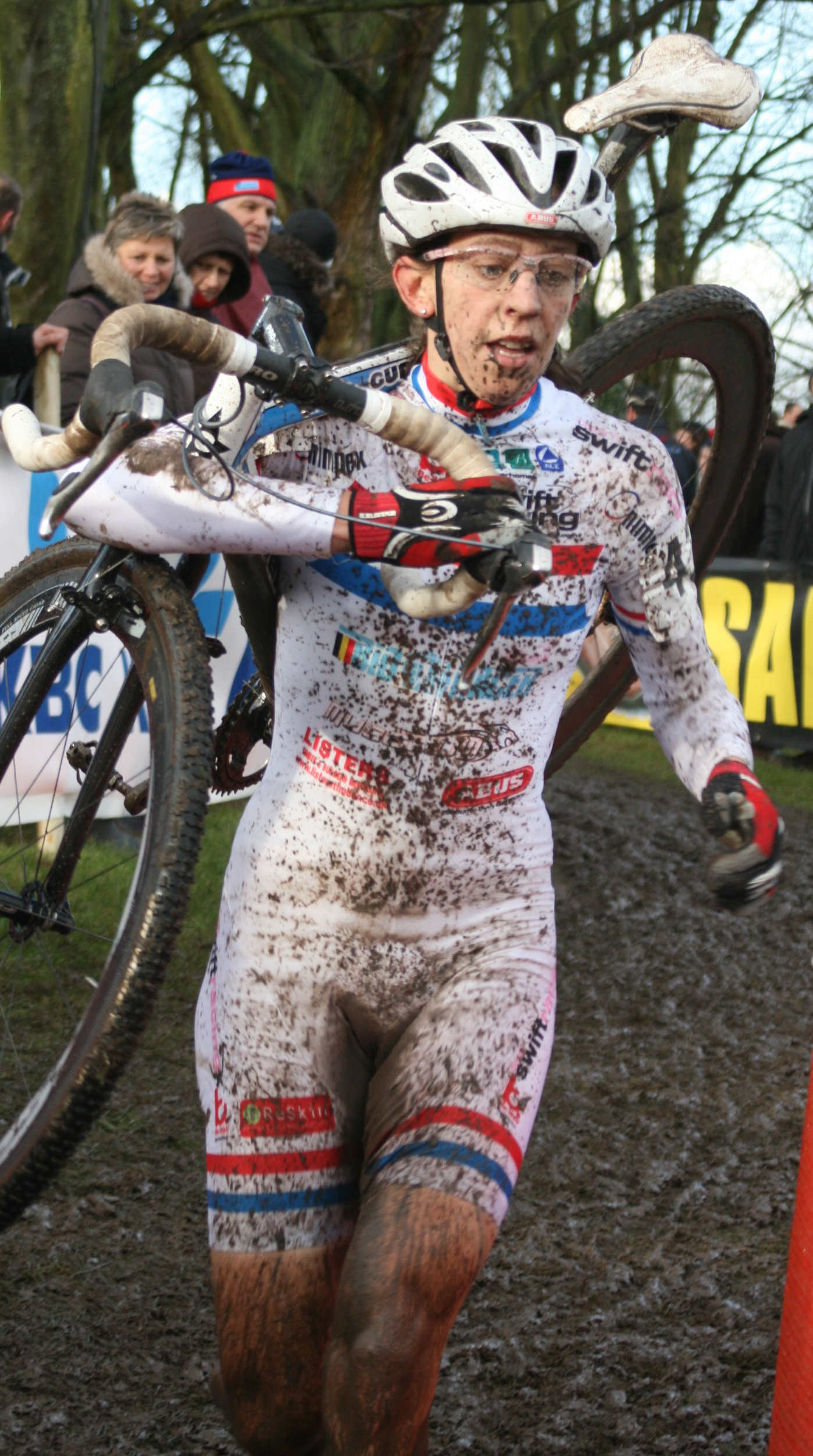
Helen Wyman wearing the national champion's jersey in 2009

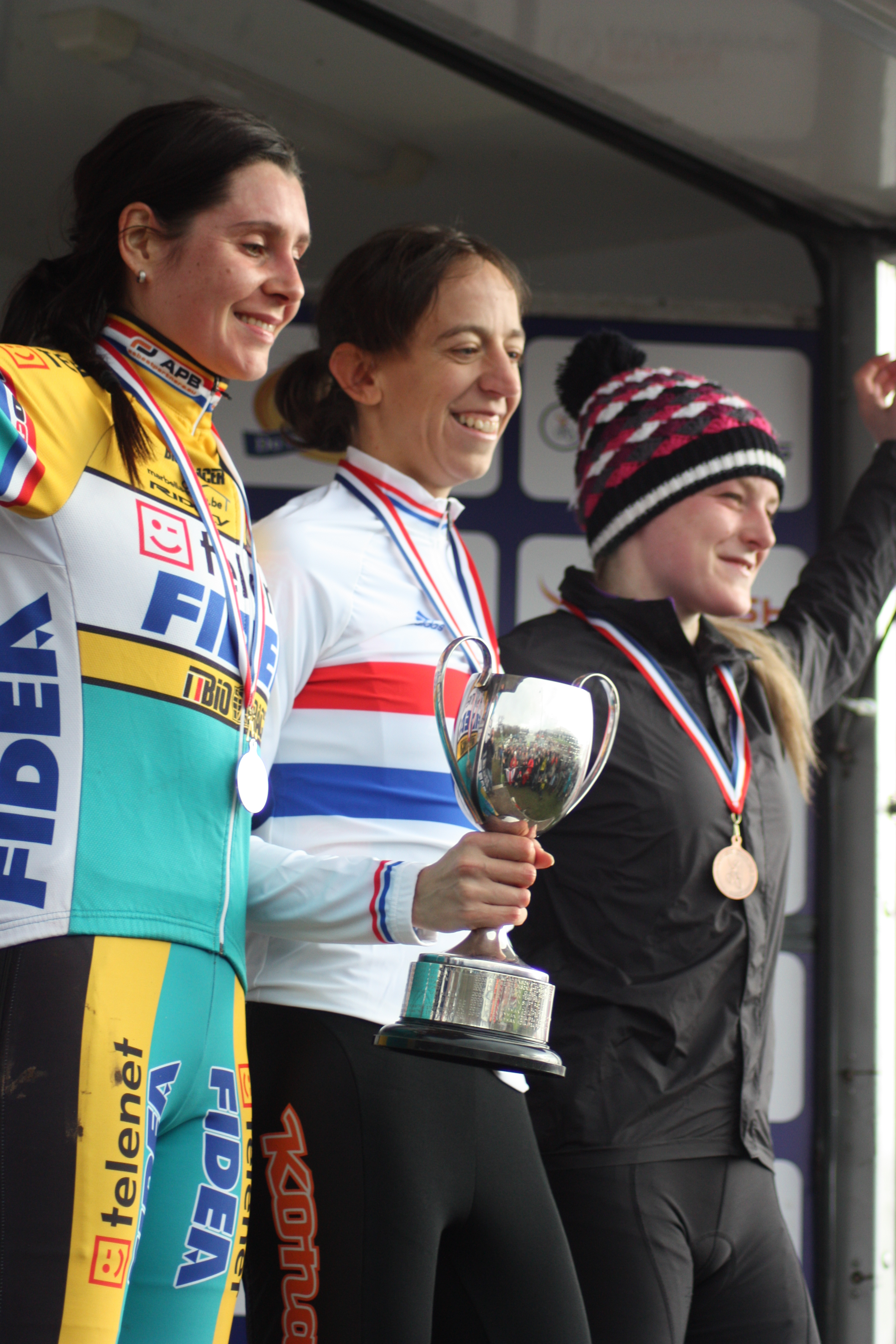
Podium, 2015.

Year	Gold	Silver	Bronze
2001	Nicole Cooke	Louise Robinson	Sue Thomas
2002	Isla Rowntree	Victoria Wilkinson	Susan Carter
2003	Isla Rowntree	Victoria Wilkinson	Nikki Harris
2004	Louise Robinson	Victoria Wilkinson	Rachel Heal
2005	Louise Robinson	Victoria Wilkinson	Helen Wyman
2006	Helen Wyman	Louise Robinson	Victoria Wilkinson
2007	Helen Wyman	Gabriella Day	Isla Rowntree
2008	Helen Wyman	Gabriella Day	Isla Rowntree
2009	Helen Wyman	Gabriella Day	Suzanne Clarke
2010	Helen Wyman	Nikki Harris	Gabriella Day
2011	Helen Wyman	Nikki Harris	Gabriella Day
2012	Helen Wyman	Nikki Harris	Annie Last
2013	Nikki Harris	Helen Wyman	Annie Last
2014	Helen Wyman	Nikki Harris	Ffion James
2015	Helen Wyman	Nikki Harris	Annie Last
2016	Nikki Harris	Helen Wyman	Delia Beddis
2017	Nikki Brammeier	Hannah Payton	Bethany Crumpton
2018	Helen Wyman	Nikki Brammeier	Bethany Crumpton
2019	Nikki Brammeier	Anna Kay	Helen Wyman
2020	Harriet Harnden	Beth Crumpton	Anna Kay
2022	Harriet Harnden	Annie Last	Anna Kay
2023	Zoe Backstedt	Annie Last	Ella Maclean-Howell
2024	Anna Kay	Ella Maclean-Howell	Grace Inglis
2025	Xan Crees	Cat Ferguson	Imogen Wolff

=== Under 23 ===
Year	Gold	Silver	Bronze
2016	Evie Richards	Bethany Crumpton	Sophie Wright
2017	Evie Richards	Amira Mellor	Ffion James
2018	Evie Richards	Harriet Harnden	Anna Kay
2019	Anna Kay	Ffion James	Sophie Thackray
2020	Harriet Harnden	Anna Kay	Amy Perryman
2022	Harriet Harnden	Xan Crees	Aldernay Baker
2023	Zoe Backstedt	Ella Maclean-Howell	Ishbel Strathdee
2024	Ella Maclean-Howell	Millie Couzens	Imogen Wolff
2025	Cat Ferguson	Imogen Wolff	Hope Inglis

=== Junior ===
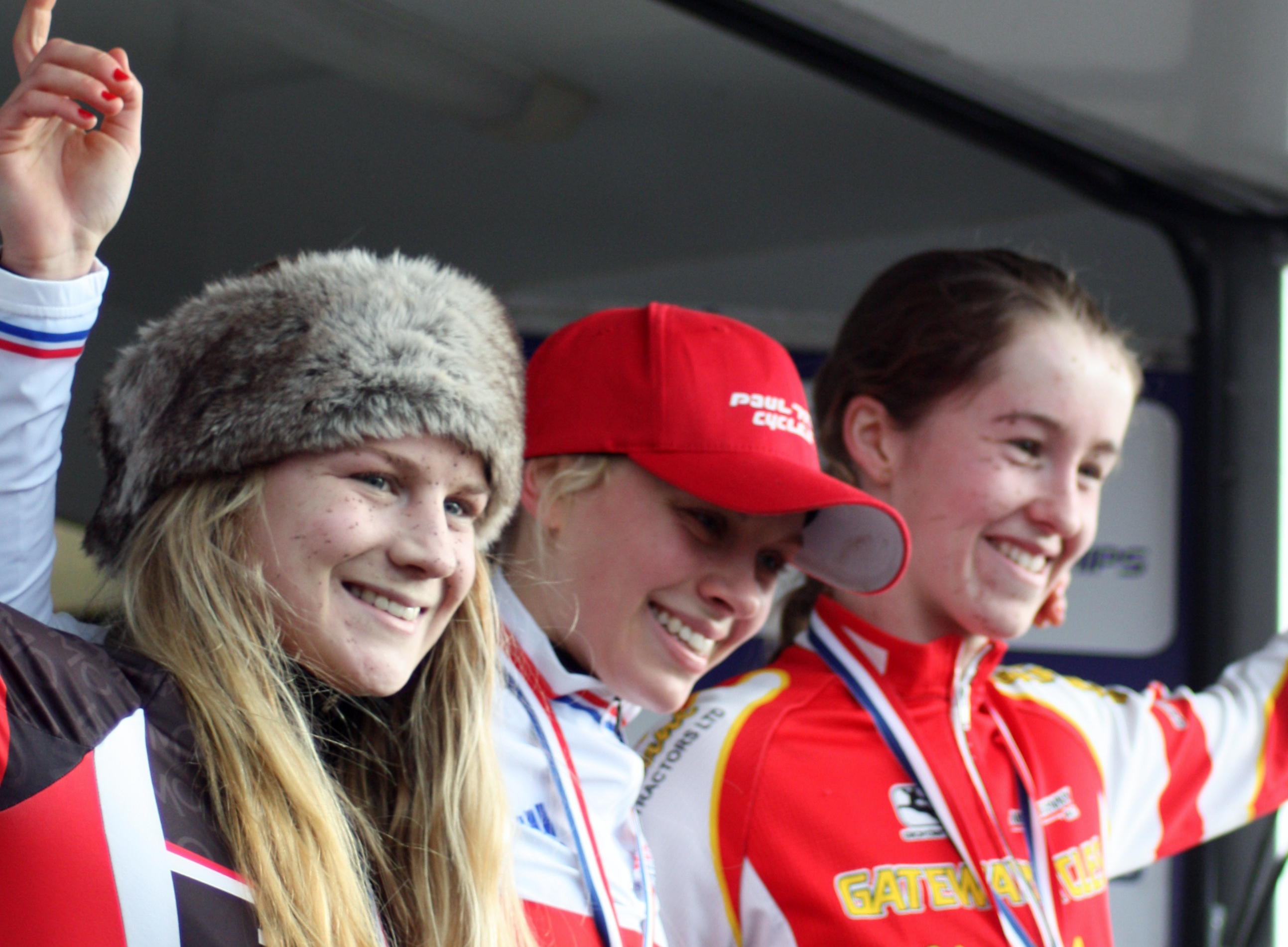
Podium, 2015 (Junior).

Year	Gold	Silver	Bronze
2006	Amy Thompson	n/a	n/a
2007	Rebecca Thompson	Corrine Hall	Becky James
2008	Annie Last	Corrine Hall	Rebecca Thompson
2009	Ruby Miller	Penny Rowson	n/a
2010	Hannah Barnes	Penny Rowson	Rebecca Keogh
2011	Hannah Payton	Bethany Crumpton	Amy Roberts
2012	Hannah Payton	Bethany Crumpton	Rebecca Preece
2013	Alice Barnes	Lucy Barnes	Emily Grant
2014	Ffion James	Abby-Mae Parkinson	Amira Mellor
2015	Amira Mellor	Evie Richards	Ffion James
2016	Sophie Wright	Sophie Thackray	Emily Wadsworth
2017	Emily Wadsworth	Sophie Thackray	Elspeth Grace
2018	Harriet Harnden	Amy Perryman	Alderney Baker
2019	Harriet Harnden	Anna Flynn	Maddie Wadsworth
2020	Millie Couzens	Josie Nelson	Anna Flynn
2022	Ella Maclean-Howell	Elizabeth McKinnon	Emily Carrick-Anderson
2023	Imogen Wolff	Elizabeth McKinnon	Florence Lissaman
2024	Cat Ferguson	Alice Colling	Esther Wong
2025	Zoe Roche	Ellie Mitchinson	Arabella Blackburn
