= Paul Wright (English cyclist) =

English professional racing cyclist

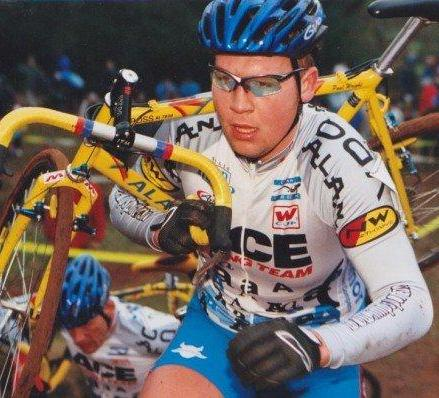

Personal information
- Born: Beeston, England
- Height: 1.93 m (6 ft 4 in)
- Weight: 98 kg (216 lb)

Cycling career
- Sport: Cycling
- Current team: Rapha CC
- Discipline: Road / MTB
- Role: Rider
- Rider type: Road / XC / DH

Professional teams
- BWM ProFlex UK International Mountain Bike Team (MTB)
- Ace Racing Team/Alan Frames/Impsport (Cyclo-cross)
- VC Saint-Lô Pont-Hébert Crédit Agricole(ROAD)
- North England FBD Insurance Rás 2007

Paul Wright (Beeston, Nottingham) is an English professional racing cyclist, specialising in cyclo-cross and mountain bike racing. He was a member of the Ace Racing Team for cyclo-cross, nationally and internationally from 1995 until 2002. He also raced to Pro-Elite level in mountain bike racing winning numerous titles in cross-country events. He currently races on the road events nationally and internationally to UCI 2.2 level.

== Palmarès ==
1994
1st (United Kingdom) TLI British National Cross Country Mountain Bike Championships Sports
2nd NEMBA Karrimor ELITE Final Downhill Championships "Press Result"

1995
3rd (United Kingdom) TLI British National Cross Country Mountain Bike Championships

1997
1st (United Kingdom) TLI British National Cross Country Mountain Bike Championships
1st (United Kingdom) "Notts & Derby Cyclo-Cross League"
1st (United Kingdom) British National Cyclo-cross Championships -Ace Racing Team

1998
1st (United Kingdom) British National Cyclo-cross Championships -Ace Racing Team
3rd (United Kingdom) TLI British National Cross Country Mountain Bike Championships

1999
1st (United Kingdom) "Midland Team Cyclo-cross Champions (East Midlands Team)"
1st (United Kingdom) British National Cyclo-cross Championships -Ace Racing Team

2000
12th Tour De La Manche (FRA) E2 (ROAD)
15th Tour Du Bessin (FRA) NAT 1 (ROAD)

2006
4th "UK East Midland State Divisional Road Race Championships" "British Cycling Report"
4th "XII Copa De Europa De Masters a Mallorca (Esp) European Road Race Championship Cup (ROAD)"

2007

Paul(L) 2007 European Road Race Championships, Bronze

1st "Plan B 2-Day Stage Race, Stage 2 UK (ROAD)"
1st "the first Tour De Oakey (Aus) (ROAD)"
2nd X Vuelta a Mallorca (Esp) "(Tour of Mallorca Stage 2 Felanitx-Felanitx) (ROAD)"
3rd "XIII Copa De Europa De Masters a Mallorca (Esp) (European Road Race Championship Cup (ROAD)"
11th FBD Insurance Rás"(IRE) (Tour of Ireland) UCI 2.2 Stage 7" Road"British Cycling Results" Stages & Final Overall Classification

2014

2nd "XX Copa De Europa De Masters a Mallorca (Esp) (European Road Race Championship Cup (ROAD)"

== British Cycling On-Line Records ==
- "British Cycling Sources" from 2006 only
