= Harry Quinn =

English bicycle manufacturer

Harry Quinn logo

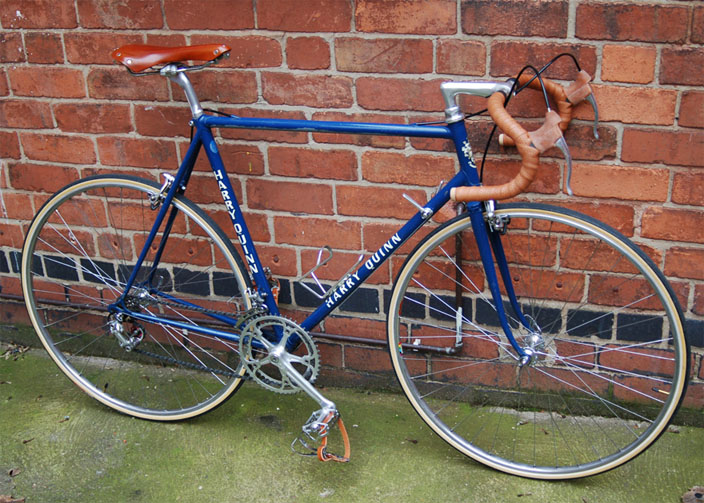
Mid-1970s Harry Quinn bicycle

Harry Quinn Cycles were a family owned high-end English bicycle manufacturer located in Liverpool, England.

The business began in 1890 as Coronet Cycles, and Harry Quinn was the son of the founder. Initially, the company was based on Walton Road, Liverpool. Harry worked in the Walton Road premises for his father, alongside his brothers and sisters. When Harry obtained the business, brothers Ronnie and Jack set up Quinn Bros Cycles in Edge Lane, Liverpool. Harry was an influential figure in the British cycling scene, also training frame builders Terry Dolan and Billy Whitcomb in his Liverpool premises. In 1977, after Harry lost sight in one eye, the business was sold to Frank Clements, brother of Ernie Clements, with Harry kept on as Master Frame Builder. In 1980, the shop was closed and in the business was sold to Falcon Cycles and was still badged as Harry Quinn, but did not carry the Harry Quinn frame numbering system. It was at this time that Terry Dolan, who had been working with Harry for several years opened his own shop across the road and the Dolan bike story began.

Late on, when Harry re-acquired the Harry Quinn company with his son Peter, the business relocated to St Florence, Wales. The company was wound up sometime in the 1990s.

Cyclists to have ridden competitively on Harry Quinn frames include John Atkins, Alan Ramsbottom, William Moore, Colin Sturgess (who won the world professional pursuit title on a Harry Quinn), Gordon Singleton (World Keirin Champion 1982), Sid Barras, Kevin Apter, Dave Penketh, Terry Tinsley, Frank Lyons, John Clewarth, Graham Daniels, Phil Roberts, John Atkinson, Brian Pownall, Paul Sherwen, Bill Bradley (who won the Milk Race in 1959 on a Harry Quinn), and Pete Chisman (Milk Race winner in 1963).

When Reg Harris made his comeback in 1975 aged 54, he asked Harry to build his bikes.

His hand-built bikes were known for their short wheelbase and steep angles, relative to other marques. In 1979, he was one of only three frame builders qualified to use 753 Reynolds tubing, the others being TI Raleigh and Bob Jackson. Harry Quinn also designed bikes for Viking Cycles.

Harry Quinn died on 1 October 2009, aged 92.

The title of the song A Lilac Harry Quinn by the band Half Man Half Biscuit on their 1991 album McIntyre, Treadmore and Davitt relates to a bicycle of that colour, although no mention of cycling nor the bike is made in the song, except for the repeated outro: 'Sturmey Archer, Campagnolo'.

== Building Philosophy ==
Harry Quinn has been building frames, using essentially the same methods, for 45 years. His interest in bicycles started as a young boy when he learned the basics of frame building from his father. His interest was further developed while racing prior to World War II (1935-37).
