= Tim Gould =

English racing cyclist

Personal information
- Born: 30 May 1964 (age 62) Matlock, Derbyshire, England

Cycling career
- Sport: Cycling
- Current team: www.zepnat.com
- Disciplines: Cyclo-cross & MTB
- Role: Rider
- Rider type: Cyclo-cross, XC & Marathon

Amateur teams
- -: Ace Racing Team
- -: Matlock CC

Professional teams
- 1987–1990: Ace RT Peugeot Cycles
- 1991–1992: Peugeot - Ritchey
- 1992–1993: Peugeot - Look
- 1993–1998: Schwinn Bicycles
Medal record
Representing United Kingdom
Mountain bike racing
World Championships
Bronze medal – third place	1990 Durango	Cross-country

Tim Gould (born 30 May 1964) is an English former professional racing cyclist specialising in cyclo-cross and mountain bike racing.

== Biography ==
After a string of World Cup victories and podium placings through the early 1990s his strength was climbing and in this era he was the best in the world, becoming the Official World Mountain Bike Hill Climb Champion in 1990 at Durango. Gould was the first human to beat a horse on a mountain bike over cross country terrain in the William Hill Man v Horse v Bike event.

Gould raced for Britain internationally and as a world class pro for the Schwinn Mountain Bike Team, with numerous wins and podium finishes in the Grundig World Cup series. Some of these include first in Chateaux D'oex Switzerland (1991), Second in Mount Snow Vermont (1994) and third at Mammoth Mountain in 1994 behind British Olympian Gary Foord. Gould's early career saw him win an impressive six cyclocross champion titles in the Three Peaks Cyclocross Race. He continued to race cyclocross after retiring from professional and international competition.

Gould was added to the Mountain Bike Hall of Fame in 1999.

In 2009 Gould was inducted into the British Cycling Hall of Fame.

2014 saw Gould make a return to cyclo-cross racing. Riding for www.zepnat.com he won the Vet 50 category in the Three Peaks (setting a new course record for this category), as well as finding success in the National Trophy series. Tim capped off his triumphant comeback season with a category win in the National Championships, held at Abergavenny Leisure Centre on 10 January 2015.

== Palmarès ==
=== MTB ===
1990
3rd XC, UCI Mountain Bike World Championships Cross-Country, Durango
1st XC, UCI Mountain Bike World Championships Hill Climb, Durango
1st Man (Cyclist) ever to beat the Horse, The William Hill Man V Horse V Bike event

1991
1st (United Kingdom) XC, British Mountain Biking National Championships
1st XC, Grundig UCI Mountain Bike World Cup, Round 1 – Bassano del Grappa
1st XC, Grundig UCI Mountain Bike World Cup, Final Round – Château-d'Œx
1st XC, Grundig UCI Mountain Bike Challenge Cup, Aviemore

=== Cyclo-cross ===
1984
Three Peaks Cyclo-Cross Champion

1985
Three Peaks Cyclo-Cross Champion

1986
Three Peaks Cyclo-Cross Champion

1987
Three Peaks Cyclo-Cross Champion

1988
Three Peaks Cyclo-Cross Champion

1989
Three Peaks Cyclo-Cross Champion

2015
Vet 50 National Cyclo-Cross Champion
