= Mick Stallard =

English racing cyclist

Mick Stallard (1944–6 April 2002) was an English racing cyclist.

The son of world champion cyclist Percy Stallard, he won the British National Cyclo-cross Championship three times in a row (1963–65), and then had a brief career (1966–68) as a professional road racer with the Falcon Cycles team.

After retiring from racing, Stallard had his own bike shop in Bradmore . He died on 6 April 2002.
