= Lewis Askey =

British cyclist

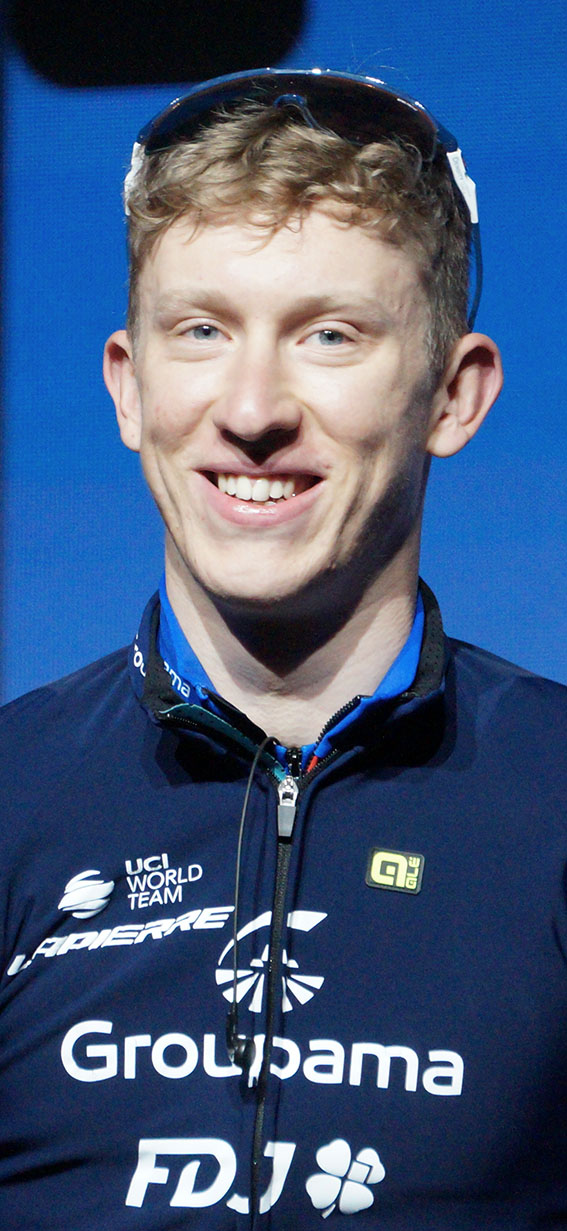
- Askey in 2023

Personal information
- Born: 4 May 2001 (age 25) Cannock, England
- Height: 1.87 m (6 ft 2 in)
- Weight: 75 kg (165 lb)

Cycling career
- Sport: Cycling
- Current team: NSN Cycling Team
- Disciplines: Road; Cyclo-cross
- Role: Rider

Professional teams
- 2020–2021: Équipe Continentale Groupama–FDJ
- 2022–2025: Groupama–FDJ
- 2026–: NSN Cycling Team

Lewis Askey (born 4 May 2001) is a British cyclist, who currently rides for UCI WorldTeam NSN Cycling Team. He signed a three-year contract with the team in August 2025.

== Personal life ==
His younger brother Ben Askey is also a professional cyclist. He is of Scottish descent through his father.

== Major results ==
=== Cyclo-cross ===
2017–2018
Junior National Trophy Series

2nd Derby
2nd Abergavenny

2018–2019
UCI Junior World Cup

2nd Heusden-Zolder

Junior Brico Cross

2nd Essen

2nd National Junior Championships
Junior DVV Trophy

3rd Loenhout

3rd Hasselt
2021–2022
National Trophy Series

1st Derby

2023–2024
3rd National Championships

=== Mountain bike ===
2023
National XCO Series

1st Cannock Chase

2024
Shimano Super Cup

1st La Rabassa

=== Road ===
2018
1st Paris–Roubaix Juniors
2nd Road race, National Junior Championships
2nd La Philippe Gilbert Juniors
5th E3 Harelbeke Junioren
2019
1st Overall Junior Tour of Wales
1st Overall Isle of Man Youth Tour

1st Stage 1

2nd Gent–Wevelgem Junioren
3rd Trofee van Vlaanderen
4th Guido Reybrouck Classic
5th Overall Keizer der Juniores
6th Kuurne-Brussels-Kuurne Juniors
6th La Philippe Gilbert Juniors
8th Paris–Roubaix Juniors
2020
10th Paris–Tours Espoirs
2021
1st Stage 2 Ronde de l'Isard
National Under-23 Championships

2nd Road race
4th Time trial

2nd Gran Premio di Poggiana
National Championships

3rd Circuit race
5th Road race

5th Road race, UCI World Under-23 Championships
8th Overall Kreiz Breizh Elites
2022
2nd Road race, National Under-23 Championships
2nd Classic Loire Atlantique
2023
2nd Paris–Tours
5th Nokere Koerse
2024
National Championships

1st Circuit race
2nd Road race

8th Classic Loire Atlantique
9th Clásica de Almería
2025 (2 pro wins)
1st Boucles de l'Aulne
2nd Overall Four Days of Dunkirk

1st Stage 2

5th Road race, National Championships
5th Le Samyn
5th Tour du Finistère
7th Nokere Koerse
10th Omloop Het Nieuwsblad
10th Grand Prix de Denain
2026 (1)
2nd Overall Tour of Britain

1st Stage 1

2nd Road race, National Championships
3rd Tro-Bro Léon
4th Overall Tour of Belgium
7th Overall Four Days of Dunkirk
8th Paris–Tours

==== Grand Tour general classification results timeline ====
Grand Tour	2023	2024	2025	2026
Giro d'Italia	—	93	—	—
Tour de France	—	—	127	151
Vuelta a España	105	—	—	—

Legend
—	Did not compete
DNF	Did not finish

=== Track ===
2019
1st Madison, National Junior Championships (with Alfie George)

=== Triathlon ===
2024 - 1st Weymouth 70.3
