= Ben Askey =

British cyclist (born 2004)

Personal information
- Full name: Ben William Askey
- Born: 14 March 2004 (age 22) Stafford, England
- Height: 1.82 m (6 ft 0 in)
- Weight: 70 kg (154 lb)

Cycling career
- Sport: Cycling
- Current team: CC Étupes
- Disciplines: Cyclo-cross; Mountain biking; Road
- Role: Rider

Amateur teams
- 2021: Bäckstedt Bike Performance JRT
- 2022: FlandersColor–Galloo Team
- 2025–: CC Étupes

Professional team
- 2023–2024: Équipe Continentale Groupama–FDJ

Ben William Askey (born 14 March 2004) is a British professional cyclist who rides for a French amateur team CC Étupes.

== Early life ==
From Wimblebury, Cannock he received a grant from Staffordshire County Council in 2016 to help him with training costs.

== Career ==
In 2022, riding for Backstedt Bike Performance he won stage 3 of the junior Tour of Ireland. In September 2022, it was announced that he would be signing for Groupama–FDJ United Continental Team. During the 2023 spring season he finished tenth at the Paris-Roubaix Espoirs and in the top-20 of junior Ghent-Wevelgem. Askey also competes in Mountain Biking and won the British National Short Track Series at the Cannock Chase Trails, in July 2023.

In August 2023, it was announced he would be continuing to ride for the team in 2024. In April 2024, he finished sixth at the Paris–Roubaix Espoirs.

In January 2026, Askey won the U23 race at the British National Cyclo-cross Championships ahead of Oscar Amey, as well as placing third in the elite open race.

== Personal life ==
He is the younger brother of professional cyclist Lewis Askey. He is of Scottish descent through his father.

== Major results ==
=== Road ===
2022
1st Stage 3 Junior Tour of Ireland
7th Menen–Kemmel–Menen
9th Overall Keizer der Juniores
2023
10th Paris–Roubaix Espoirs
2024
6th Paris–Roubaix Espoirs

=== Cyclo-cross ===
2021–2022
2nd National Junior Championships
National Junior Trophy Series

2nd Derby
2nd Milnthorpe
3rd Gravesend

Junior X²O Badkamers Trophy

2nd Koppenberg

2nd Junior Clanfield
UCI Junior World Cup

4th Tábor

2024–2025
Hope Supercross

3rd Wyke, Bradford

2025–2026
3rd National Championships
1st National U23 Championships
