= John Atkins (cyclist) =

English racing cyclist

Personal information
- Full name: John Atkins
- Born: 7 April 1942 (age 84) Coventry, Warwickshire, England; Great Britain

Cycling career
- Sport: Cycling
- Discipline: Cyclo-cross
- Role: Rider

Amateur team

Professional teams
- 1968: Marsh and Baxter
- 1969: Carlton - Truwel
- 1970: Fred Baker
- 1971–1972: TI -Carlton
- 1973–1975: TI - Raleigh
- 1975–1979: Viscount - Shimano
- 1978–1979: Harry Quinn - Galli

John Atkins (born 7 April 1942), is a British former racing cyclist specialising in cyclo-cross, and 12 times national cyclo-cross champion. He was a professional cyclist between 1968 and 1979.

== Biography ==
Atkins was born in Coventry, the son of Edith and Roland (Ron) Atkins. His mother was a prolific breaker of long-distance cycling records in the 1950s.

John Atkins began cycling on the cleared areas and bomb sites that followed intensive bombing of Coventry in the Second World War. He started racing at 17.

He won his first national cyclo-cross championship in 1961 when he was 19. He was in a group of four and passed them by taking a longer route to the right around bushes where the others had ridden to the left. It gave him a few seconds' lead that he held to the finish.

He won again in 1962 but was handicapped until 1966 by a stomach ulcer. He dominated cyclo-cross in Britain for the next 10 years.

He came fifth in the 1968 world championship, then turned professional for a sausage-maker, Marsh & Baxter. A year later he moved to Carlton Cycles for five years. He rode for Viscount-Shimano from 1975 to 1978 and then for Harry Quinn Cycles. He retired in 1979.

Atkins founded John Atkins Cycles in Coventry, now known as Coventry Cycle Centre. After retiring from professional cycling, Atkins ran a cycle and toy shop in Pwllheli on the Llŷn Peninsula.

== Palmarès ==
1961
1st (United Kingdom) British National Cyclo-cross Championships
1962
1st (United Kingdom) British National Cyclo-cross Championships
1963
2nd British National Cyclo-cross Championships
1966
1st (United Kingdom) British National Cyclo-cross Championships
1967
1st (United Kingdom) British National Cyclo-cross Championships
1968
1st (United Kingdom) British National Cyclo-cross Championships
1969
1st (United Kingdom) British National Cyclo-cross Championships
1st Three Peaks Cyclo-Cross
1970
1st (United Kingdom) British National Cyclo-cross Championships
1st Three Peaks Cyclo-Cross
1971
1st (United Kingdom) British National Cyclo-cross Championships
1972
1st (United Kingdom) British National Cyclo-cross Championships
1973
1st (United Kingdom) British National Cyclo-cross Championships
1974
1st (United Kingdom) British National Cyclo-cross Championships
1975
2nd British National Cyclo-cross Championships
1976
2nd British National Cyclo-cross Championships
1st Three Peaks Cyclo-Cross
1977
1st (United Kingdom) British National Cyclo-cross Championships
1978
2nd British National Cyclo-cross Championships
