= Xan Crees =

British cyclist (born 2000)

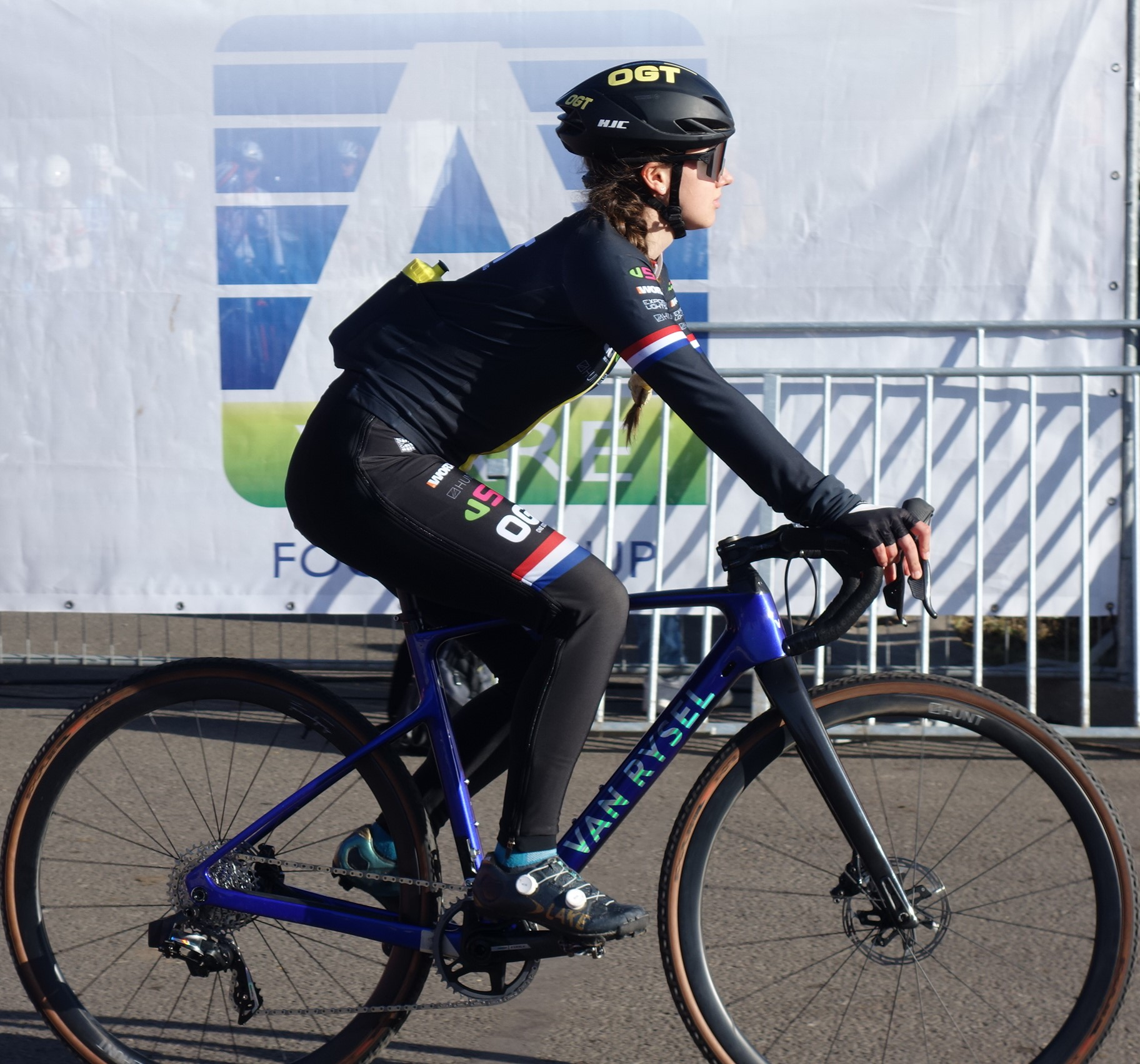
- Crees in 2026

Personal information
- Born: 27 December 2000 (age 25)

Cycling career
- Sport: Cycling
- Current team: OGT p.b., USE-Components
- Disciplines: Gravel; Cyclo-cross
- Role: Rider

Amateur team
- 2021-2025: Spectra Racing

Professional team
- 2025 -: OGT p.b., USE-Components

Xan Crees (born 27 December 2000) is a British cyclist who rides for OGT p.b., USE-Components. She won the British National Gravel Championship in 2023. In 2025, she won the British National Cyclo-cross Championships.

== Early life ==
From Derby, she became interested in cycling at an early age after watching her father compete in 24-hour races and joined her local cycling club Derby Mercury. She played a number of sports as a youngster, including netball, mixed martial arts, and swimming. She graduated from Loughborough University with a degree in natural sciences.

== Career ==
She joined Spectra Racing ahead of the 2021-22 cyclocross season, in which she won a silver medal in the under-23 British National Championships.

She won the British National Gravel Championship in Suffolk in 2023. In December 2023, she won her first senior National Trophy Series cyclocross race in Gravesend.

She won the elite women's race at the British National Cyclo-cross Championships in January 2025, defeating Cat Ferguson into second-place.

On 11 January 2026, Crees was runner-up to Anna Flynn at the British Cyclo-cross Championships.

== Major results ==
=== Cyclo-cross ===
2022–2023
2nd National Under-23 Championships
2024–2025
1st National Championships
2025–2026
2nd National Championships

=== Gravel ===
2023
1st National Championships
