= Danny Axford =

English cyclist

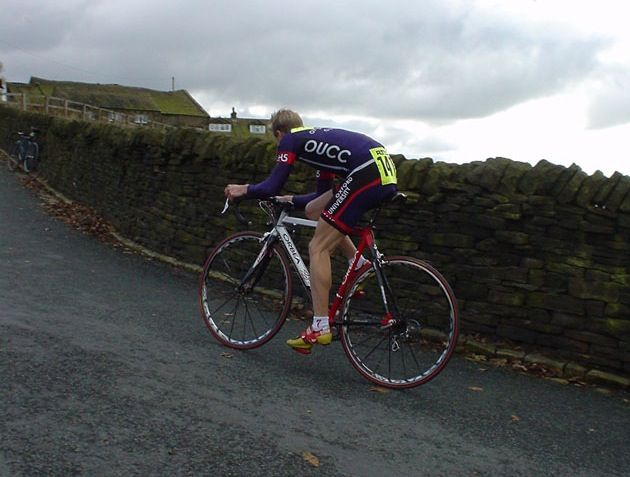
- Axford on his way to a 4th BUSA Hillclimb victory

Personal information
- Full name: Daniel Axford
- Born: 7 April 1975 (age 51)

Cycling career
- Sport: Cycling
- Discipline: Road
- Role: Rider
- Rider type: Climber

Amateur teams
- ?: Oxford University Cycling Club
- 2003: Parrot Print/TAL
- 2004: Stilton RT
- 2005–: Arctic Shorter Rochford Racing Team

Daniel Axford (born 1975) is an English racing cyclist from Winchester.

Axford attended Oxford University and enjoyed some success in BUSA cycling events whilst at university.

== Palmarès ==
1993
1st Junior Tour of Wales

1998
3rd Tour of the Cotswolds
3rd Tour of the Peak, Premier Calendar event

1999
3rd Havant International GP, Premier Calendar event

2003
4th Havant International GP, Premier Calendar event

1st Points competition

2009
1st British National Masters Road Race Championships (30-35 yrs)
1st British National Masters Time Trial Championships (30-35 yrs)

2007
1st National Hill Climb Championships - Team (Arctic Shorter Rochford RT - J Dobbin, D Axford, P Bissell)
