= Junior Tour of Wales =

Race details
- Date: August bank holiday
- Region: Blaenau Gwent, Wales
- English name: Junior Tour of Wales
- Discipline: Junior male Road race
- Type: Four day 5 stage road race
- Organiser: John Richards (29 years); Talbot Thrush (5 years); Richard Hopkins (2015–
- Web site: www.juniortourofwales.com

History
- First edition: 1981
- Editions: 42 (as of 2023)
- Most recent: Sebastian Grindley (ENG)

The Junior Tour of Wales is an annual cycle race for junior male riders, held around Brynmawr, Blaenau Gwent, Wales. First held in 1981, the race is the final round of the British Cycling Junior Road Series – and as such attracts the best junior racing cyclists from across the UK, as well as elite international junior teams from across Europe and beyond. From 1981 until 1993 the race consisted of three stages held over two days. In 1993 it was expanded to three days and held on the August Bank Holiday for the first time. In 2017 it switched to a four-day format. In recent years the race's final stage has finished on the Tumble: this climb often decides the winner of the race.

Steve Jones and Eddie Smart were regular helpers at the Junior Tour of Wales. Following their death in a car accident, organiser John Richards introduced a shield to be awarded in their honour for the best Welsh rider.

In 2009, Jeff Banks became patron of the Junior Tour of Wales, to be succeeded in 2012 by Geraint Thomas. The headquarters moved 2014 from Nantyglo Leisure Centre to Brynmawr Foundation School following the closure of the former.

== Results ==
=== General classification ===
Year	1st	2nd	3rd
1981	Results missing		
1982	Not held		
1983	Results missing		
1984	(England) Gary Brooks	(England) L Clarke	
1985	Results missing		
1986	(England) Tim Warriner	(England) Chris Taudevin	(England) Tim Ward
1987	(England) Matthew Stephens	(Wales) Dylan Williams [WAL]	(England) Robert Langley
1988	(England) Matthew Stephens	(England) Paul Altridge	(England) Lee Davis
1989	(England) Steve Whittington	(England) Victor Slinn	
1990	(England) Ken Stewart	(England) Danny Smith	(Republic of Ireland) Bill Moore
1991	(England) Roger Hammond	(England) Ken Stewart	= (England) Gavin Pardoe = (England) Rob Lyne
1992	(United Kingdom) Ken Stewart	(United Kingdom) Alex Arch	(United Kingdom) Richard Montgomery
1993	(England) Danny Axford	(England) Ian Mountain	(Wales) Anthony Malarczyk
1994	(England) Richard Hobby	(Scotland) David Millar	(England) Danny Moore
1995	(England) Charly Wegelius	(England) Tom Barras	(England) Neil Ellison
1996	(Scotland) Ross Muir	(England) Steve Joseph	(England) Tom Newton
1997	(England) Dave Clarke	(England) Kristian House	(England) Neil Swithenbank
1998	(England) Anthony Spencer	(England) Ryan Smith	(Netherlands) Gerben van der Reep
1999	(Belgium) Johan Vansummeren	(Netherlands) Arne Kornekoor	(England) James Flanagan
2000	(Scotland) Alex Coutts	(Wales) Lewys Hobbs	(England) Andrew Allen
2001	(Scotland) Alex Coutts	(Netherlands) Marcel Lambrecht	(England) Chris Penketh
2002	(Netherlands) Marcel Lamberts	(England) Adam Illingworth	(Wales) Craig Cooke
2003	(Scotland) David Smith	(England) Ryan Bonser	(Republic of Ireland) Mark Cassidy
2004	(England) Dan Martin	(Wales) Geraint Thomas	(Republic of Ireland) Martin Monroe
2005	(England) Alex Dowsett	(Norway) Edvald Boasson Hagen	(England) Alex Atkins
2006	(England) Tom Diggle	(Isle of Man) Peter Kennaugh	(England) Alex Dowsett
2007	(England) Johnny McEvoy	(England) Erick Rowsell	(Isle of Man) Peter Kennaugh
2008	(England) Erick Rowsell	(Norway) Johan Fredrik Ziesler	(England) Joe Perrett
2009	(Isle of Man) Tim Kennaugh	(Wales) Sam Harrison	(England) Josh Edmondson
2010	(England) Dan McLay	(Wales) Sam Harrison	(England) Josh Edmondson
2011	(England) Brennan Townshend	(England) Matthew Holmes	(England) Luke Grivell-Mellor
2012	(England) Hugh Carthy	(England) Will Stephenson	(Wales) Ed Laverack
2013	(Wales) Scott Davies	(Netherlands) Sam Oomen	(England) James Knox
2014	(Republic of Ireland) Eddie Dunbar	(England) Alex Braybrooke	(England) Matthew Gibson
2015	(Isle of Man) Nathan Draper	(England) Max Williamson	(England) Joey Walker
2016	(England) Fred Wright	(England) Ethan Hayter	(England) Jake Stewart
2017	(England) Tom Pidcock	(Republic of Ireland) Ben Healy	(England) Fred Wright
2018	(England) Ben Tulett	(England) Leo Hayter	(Republic of Ireland) Archie Ryan
2019	(England) Lewis Askey	(England) George Mills-Keeling	(New Zealand) Drew Christensen
2020	Not held		
2021	(Isle of Man) Tyler Hannay	(England) Jack Brough	(England) Lucas Towers
2022	(England) Noah Hobbs	(Wales) Josh Tarling	(England) Joshua Golliker
2023	(Wales) Tomos Pattinson	(Republic of Ireland) Liam O'Brien	(England) Cormac Nisbet
2024	(England) Sebastian Grindley	(Scotland) Elliot Rowe	(Republic of Ireland) Killian O'Brien
2025	(England) Magnus Denwood	(England) Edwin Boyle	(England) Thomas Lewis

=== Points classification ===
Year	1st	2nd	3rd
1999	(Netherlands) Ronald Schur	(England) Anthony Spencer	(Scotland) Iain Redpath
2000	(Scotland) Iain Redpath	(England) James Bell	(England) Mark Baker
2001	(England) Martin Quill	(England) Ben Clark	(Netherlands) Stefan de Kok
2002	(Republic of Ireland) Matt Brammeier	(England) Peter Johnston	(Isle of Man) Mark Cavendish
2003	(England) Ryan Bonser	(Scotland) David Smith	(England) Ben Crawforth
2004	(Isle of Man) Peter Williams	(Wales) Geraint Thomas	(Wales) Rob Blunden
2005	(Norway) Martin Lundberg	(England) Alex Dowsett	(England) Chris Opie
2006	(Wales) Matt Rowe	(England) Adam Blythe	(Isle of Man) Jonathan Bellis
2007	(Wales) Luke Rowe	(England) Ben Plain	(Wales) Sam Webster
2008	(Isle of Man) Mark Christian	(Belgium) Eliot Letaer	(England) Erick Rowsell
2009	(Wales) Jon Mould	(England) Josh Edmondson	(Isle of Man) Tim Kennaugh
2010	(Wales) Owain Doull	(Republic of Ireland) Conor Dunne	(England) Dan McLay
2011	(England) Ali Slater	(England) Jonathan Dibben	(England) Jim Lewis
2012	(England) Sam Lowe	(England) Chris Lawless	(Wales) Ed Laverack
2013	(England) Jacob Scott	(Republic of Ireland) Eddie Dunbar	(England) Leon Mazzone
2014	(Wales) Joe Holt	(England) Leon Mazzone	(England) Matthew Gibson
2015	(Wales) Joe Holt	(England) Etienne Georgi	(England) Robert Scott
2016	(England) Matt Walls	(England) Ethan Hayter	(England) Charlie Quarterman
2017	(Wales) Rhys Britton	(England) Joe Hill	(Republic of Ireland) John Buller
2018	(England) Ethan Vernon	(Republic of Ireland) Ben Healy	(New Zealand) Bailey O'Donnell
2019	(Scotland) Alfred George	(England) Samuel Watson	(Isle of Man) James Harrison
2021	(England) Josh Giddings	(Scotland) Kieran Riley	(England) Noah Hobbs
2022	(Wales) Fred Meredith	(Isle of Man) Zac Walker	(England) Noah Hobbs
2023	(England) Jed Smithson	(England) Sebastian Grindley	(England) Zak Machin
2024	(Wales) Rory Gravelle	(England) Alistair Gardner	(Scotland) Elliot Rowe
2025	(England) William Mitchell	(Scotland) Evan Marsh	(England) Ryan Oldfield

=== Mountains classification ===
Year	1st	2nd	3rd
1998	(England) James Jenkins	(England) Richard Heath	(Netherlands) Hans Dekkers
1999	(England) James Flanagan	(Belgium) Johan Vansummeren	(Netherlands) Peter van den Berg
2000	(Wales) Lewys Hobbs	(Wales) David Heaven	(Scotland) Alex Coutts
2001	(Netherlands) Erik van Bekkum	(Netherlands) Bart Kerkdijk	(Scotland) Alex Coutts
2002	(England) Adam Illingworth	(Republic of Ireland) Nicolas Roche	(Netherlands) Marcel Lamberts
2003	(Scotland) David Smith	(England) Ryan Bonser	(Republic of Ireland) Dan Martin
2004	(Isle of Man) Peter Williams	(Wales) Geraint Thomas	(Republic of Ireland) Martin Monroe
2005	(England) Alex Dowsett	(Norway) Edvald Boasson Hagen	(Norway) Martin Lundberg
2006	(England) Alex Dowsett	(Isle of Man) Jonathan Bellis	(Wales) Luke Rowe
2007	(Isle of Man) Peter Kennaugh	(England) Johnny McEvoy	(England) Erick Rowsell
2008	(Isle of Man) Mark Christian	(Belgium) Tosh Van der Sande	(England) Joe Perrett
2009	(England) Joe Perret	(Wales) Sam Harrison	(England) Josh Edmondson
2010	(England) Josh Edmondson	(England) Simon Yates	(England) Matt Hill
2011	(England) Matthew Holmes	(England) Luke Grivell-Mellor	(England) Brennan Townshend
2012	(England) Hugh Carthy	(England) Chris Lawless	(England) Will Stephenson
2013	(England) James Knox	(Wales) Scott Davies	(Netherlands) Sam Oomen
2014	(England) Ben Chapman	(Republic of Ireland) Eddie Dunbar	(England) Dan Gardner
2015	(Republic of Ireland) Darragh O'Mahony	(England) Alfie Moses	(England) Joey Walker
2016	(England) Charlie Quarterman	(England) Mark Donovan	(England) Tom Pidcock
2017	(England) Fred Wright	(England) Tom Pidcock	(Republic of Ireland) Ben Healy
2018	(England) Harrison Wood	(England) Mason Hollyman	(Scotland) Alfred George
2019	(England) Thomas Gloag	(England) Lewis Askey	(England) Samuel Watson
2021	(Isle of Man) Tyler Hannay	(England) Owen Lightfoot	(England) Lucas Towers
2022	(England) Joshua Golliker	(England) Noah Hobbs	(Wales) Josh Tarling
2023	(England) Bryn Lawrence	(England) Cormac Nisbet	(Wales) Tomos Pattinson
2024	(England) Ethan Squires	(England) Oliver Dawson	(Republic of Ireland) Killian O'Brien
2025	(England) Huw Watkins	(England) George Bromley	(England) Harley Widdowson

=== Team classification ===
Year	1st	2nd	3rd
1999	(Netherlands) District Suid-Holland	(England) South East Midlands Division	(Belgium) North Limberg
2000	Scotland	Wales	(England) West Thames A
2001	(Netherlands) WV Dommelstreek	(England) Team South West	(England) West Midlands Division
2003	Scotland	(England) BC North Western Division	Ireland
2004	Ireland	(United Kingdom) Dataphonics RT	Wales A
2005	(England) Glendene CC	Norway	(United Kingdom) Kinesis UK
2006	(England) Glendene CC	(United Kingdom) Kinesis UK	(United Kingdom) Merlin Development
2007	(England) Glendene CC / Bike Trax	Wales	(United Kingdom) In Gear Development
2008	(Belgium) Avia Cycling Team	(Norway) Nymark Cycling Team	(England) Glendene / Bike Trax A
2009	(England) Glendene CC / Bike Trax	Ireland	Wales
2010	(England) Glendene CC/Ridley/Vitesse/OCE	(England) Herbal Life/Wheelbase	(England) Maxgear RT
2011	(England) Hargroves Cycles/Specialised/Trant	(England) Yorkshire	(England) Team South West
2012	Wales	(England) Sportscover Altura RT	(England) Team De Ver/Stevens/Mosquito/Prestige
2013	(Netherlands) TWC Pijnenburg	(England) Team De Ver	(England) RST Racing Team
2014	(Republic of Ireland) Sensa Munster	(England) HARIBO Beacon Cycling Team	(England) Velocity WD-40
2015	(England) RST Racing Team	(England) Giant Cycling Club – Halo Films	(England) HMT Academy with JLT Condor
2016	(England) VCUK-PH-MAS	(England) VC Londres	(England) HMT Academy with JLT Condor
2017	(England) Zappi Racing Team	(England) VC Londres	(England) East Midlands Region
2018	(Republic of Ireland) NRPT – Chill.ie	(England) East Midlands Region	(England) PH-MAS/Paul Milnes Cycles
2019	(England) VC Londres	(England) Fensham Howes – MAS Design	(Scotland) Spokes Racing
2021	(England) Cero-Cycle Division Racing Team	(England) Fensham Howes – MAS Design	(Isle of Man) Utmost IOM Junior Cycling Team
2022	(England) Tofauti Everyone Active	Wales	(England) Cero-Cycle Division Racing Team
2023	(England) Tofauti Everyone Active	Wales	(England) Zappi Junior Race Team
2024	(England) Fensham Howes - MAS Design	Wales	(England) trainSharp Development team
