= Jonathan Bellis =

Manx cyclist born (1988)

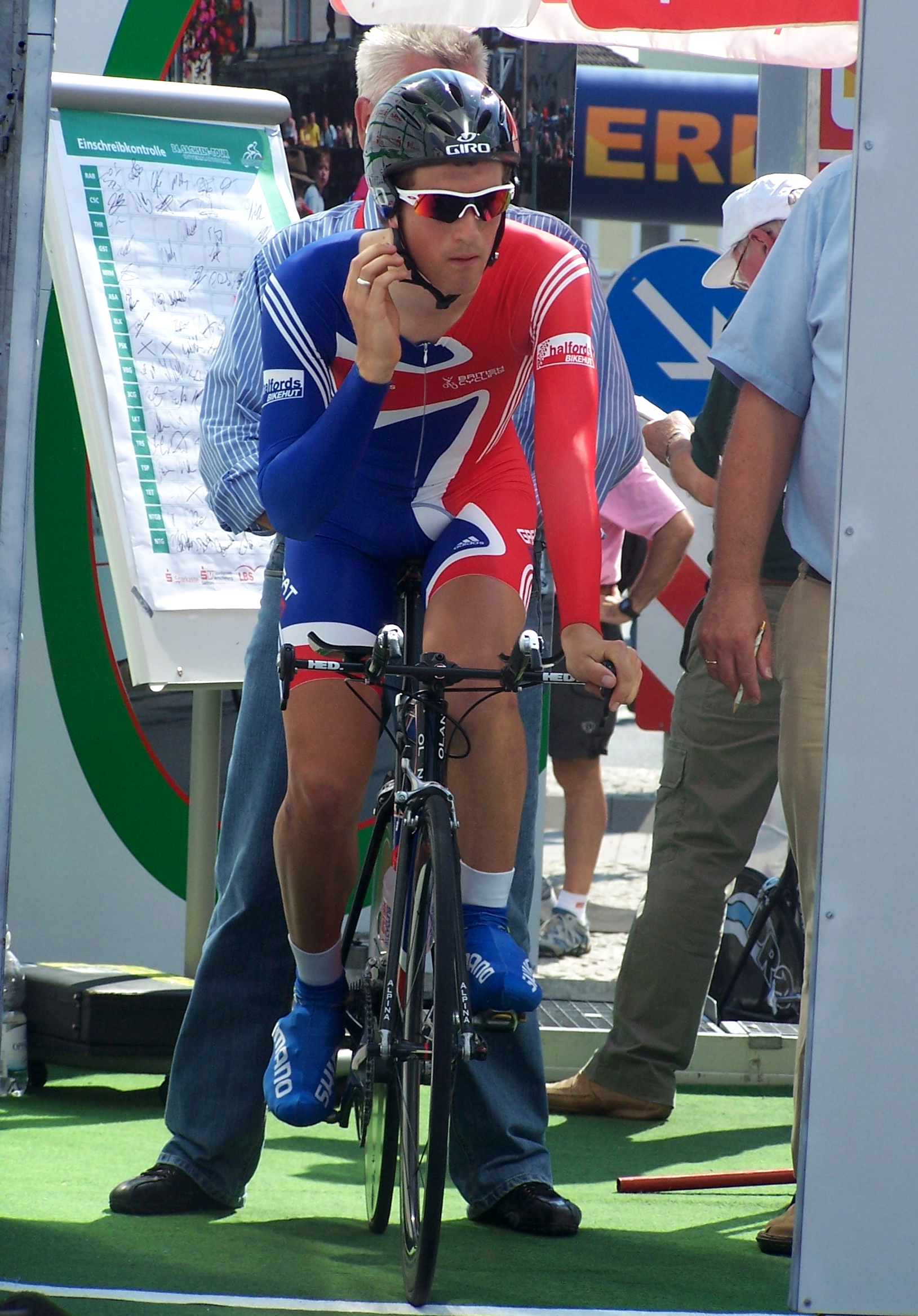
- Bellis at the Sachsen-Tour 2008

Personal information
- Full name: Jonathan Bellis
- Nickname: Jonnty
- Born: 16 August 1988 (age 38) Douglas, Isle of Man
- Height: 1.89 m (6 ft 2 in)
- Weight: 69 kg (152 lb)

Cycling career
- Sport: Cycling
- Disciplines: Track; Road
- Role: Rider (retired); Directeur sportif

Amateur teams
- –2005: Manx RC
- 2005: Glendene CC
- 2006–2008: 100% ME (British U23 team)
- 2013: ILLI-Bikes Cycling Team

Professional teams
- 2008: CSC–Saxo Bank (stagiaire)
- 2009–2011: Team Saxo Bank
- 2012: An Post–Sean Kelly
- 2014: Christina Watches–Dana
- 2015: ONE Pro Cycling

Managerial team
- 2019: Drops

Jonathan Bellis (born 16 August 1988) is a Manx former racing cyclist from Douglas, who rode professionally between 2008 and 2015 for the Saxo Bank–SunGard, An Post–Sean Kelly, Christina Watches–Dana and ONE Pro Cycling teams. He represented Great Britain on the track and the roads. Bellis briefly worked as a directeur sportif for UCI Women's Team Drops in 2019, but was suspended, after being convicted of assault.

== Career ==
Bellis emerged from the British Olympic Academy Programme. After success in European track championships, he became Britain's first medalist at the under-23 world road championship, in 2007, finishing third. He represented Britain at the 2008 Olympic Games in the road race. He then signed with CSC–Saxo Bank as a trainee and rode the 2008 Tour of Britain.

On 19 September 2009, he crashed on a motor scooter near the Great Britain academy training base in Quarrata, Italy. At first he was in a critical condition, but soon became stable. He began awaking from his induced coma four weeks later. His skull had been shattered by the accident, and he had suffered fractures to the nose, cheekbones and sternum and a blood clot on his spine. Doctors initially feared that he would be quadraplegic, and he subsequently contracted infections, suffered a stroke and twice underwent an emergency tracheotomy. However Bellis managed to start riding again ten months after the accident and returned to competition at the 2010 Tour of Britain, a year after the crash.

In 2012, he joined the An Post–Sean Kelly team. Subsequently, he joined the ILLI-Bikes Cycling Team, a Belgian amateur squad, in 2013. Bellis returned to the professional peloton in 2014, securing a deal with the Christina Watches–Dana team. After one season Bellis was announced as part of the inaugural squad for the ONE Pro Cycling team in 2015.

In December 2015 he announced via Twitter that he was retiring from professional competition. In an interview later that month he said he was hoping to remain involved in the sport in a coaching role. He was subsequently appointed as a coach at Lee Valley VeloPark.

== Major results ==
=== Road ===
2005
4th Overall Junior Tour of Wales

1st Stage 4

2006
1st Stage 4 Junior Tour of Wales
2007
3rd Road race, UCI World Under-23 Championships
2008
3rd Road race, National Championships
2009
8th Tour de Rijke

=== Track ===
2006
1st Team pursuit, UEC European Junior Championships
1st Individual pursuit, National Junior Championships
2007
UEC European Under-23 Championships

1st Points race
1st Scratch

2008
Under-23 UIV Cup

1st Berlin
1st Copenhagen
