= Craig Cooke =

Personal information
- Full name: Craig Cooke
- Born: 28 December 1984 (age 41)

Cycling career
- Sport: Cycling
- Disciplines: Track, road & cyclo-cross
- Role: Rider

Amateur team
- Cardiff Ajax CC

Craig Cooke (born 28 December 1984) is a Welsh racing cyclist. Cooke is the son of Tony and Denise Cooke, and the younger brother of Nicole Cooke.

== Palmarès ==
2000
3rd British National Cyclo-cross Championships - Junior

2001
3rd British National Cyclo-cross Championships - Junior

2002
3rd British National Road Race Championships - Junior
3rd Junior Tour of Wales

2004
2nd Welsh National Cyclo-cross Championships
