= Sebastian Grindley =

British cyclist (born 2006)

Personal information
- Born: 24 April 2006 (age 20) Wigan, England

Cycling career
- Sport: Cycling
- Current team: Lidl–Trek Future Racing
- Disciplines: Cyclocross; Road
- Role: Rider

Amateur team
- 2023–2024: Fensham Howes–MAS Design

Professional team
- 2025–: Lidl–Trek Future Racing
Medal record
Men's road bicycle racing
Representing Great Britain
World Championships
Silver medal – second place	2024 Zurich	Junior road race

Sebastian Grindley (born 24 April 2006) is a British road cyclist who rides for UCI Continental team Lidl–Trek Future Racing. In 2024, he was runner up in the Junior Road Race World Championships. He is the son of sprinter and Olympic medalist David Grindley.

== Early life ==
He is from Stockton Heath and attended The Grange School, Northwich. He is a member of North Cheshire Clarion Cycling Club in Warrington. He became national U14 champion when he won the cyclocross title in 2020. He became the British Cyclocross Champion at under-16 level in 2022.

== Career ==
He was selected the European Youth Olympic Festival (EYOF) in Slovakia in July 2022 at the age of 16 years-old, winning bronze in the time trial and finishing twelfth in the road race.

For the 2023 season he stepped up to juniors with the Fensham Howes MAS Design Junior Team. He won the British 2023 Junior Cyclocross Championship, and finished runner-up in the British junior road race. He placed eighth at the Junior World Championahops road race in Glasgow.

In August 2024, he won the junior Tour of Wales. In September 2024, he won silver in the UCI Road World Championships – Junior men's road race in Zurich. Shortly afterwards, he signed for UCI Continental team Lidl–Trek Future Racing. Grindley missed half of his debut season with the team after he fractured vertebra in a crash at the 2025 British National Championships.

== Personal life ==
He is the son of Zoe and David Grindley, a track and field athlete won a bronze medal at the 1992 Olympic Games in the 4x400 metres relay. He has a sister, Elizabeth.

== Major results ==
=== Cyclo-cross ===
2022–2023
1st National Junior Championships
2023–2024
Junior National Trophy Series

1st Gravesend
1st Paignton

2nd National Junior Championships

=== Road ===
2023
1st Young rider classification, Junior Tour of Wales
2nd Overall Junior Tour of Mendips

1st Stage 3

8th Road race, UCI World Junior Championships
2024
1st Overall Junior Tour of Wales

1st Stage 4

1st Overall Junior Tour of Mendips

1st Stage 2

1st Nokere Koerse Juniors
1st Mountains classification, Keizer der Juniores
2nd Overall St Martinusprijs Juniors

1st Points classification
1st Stage 2

2nd Road race, UCI World Junior Championships
3rd Overall Aubel–Stavelot Juniors
2025
4th Time trial, National Under-23 Championships
2026
10th Philadelphia Cycling Classic
