= Chris Wreghitt =

British cyclist

Christopher Michael Wreghitt (born 11 November 1958) is a former British professional racing cyclist and five times consecutive winner of the British National Cyclo-cross Championships between 1978 and 1982.

Moving to pro road cycling, he cycled for the Bianchi cycling team and was winner of the 1983 one day race Gran Premio di Lugano. He finished 47th in the 1984 Tour de Suisse. He retired in 1984 due to a back injury.

He founded the company Global Opportunities in 1990 which is a worldwide consultancy and sales and marketing agency, specialising in the bicycle and fitness markets; the company continues to be run from the Wreghitt's family home in Worcestershire, despite it being flooded in 2007.
