= Anna Kay =

British cyclist

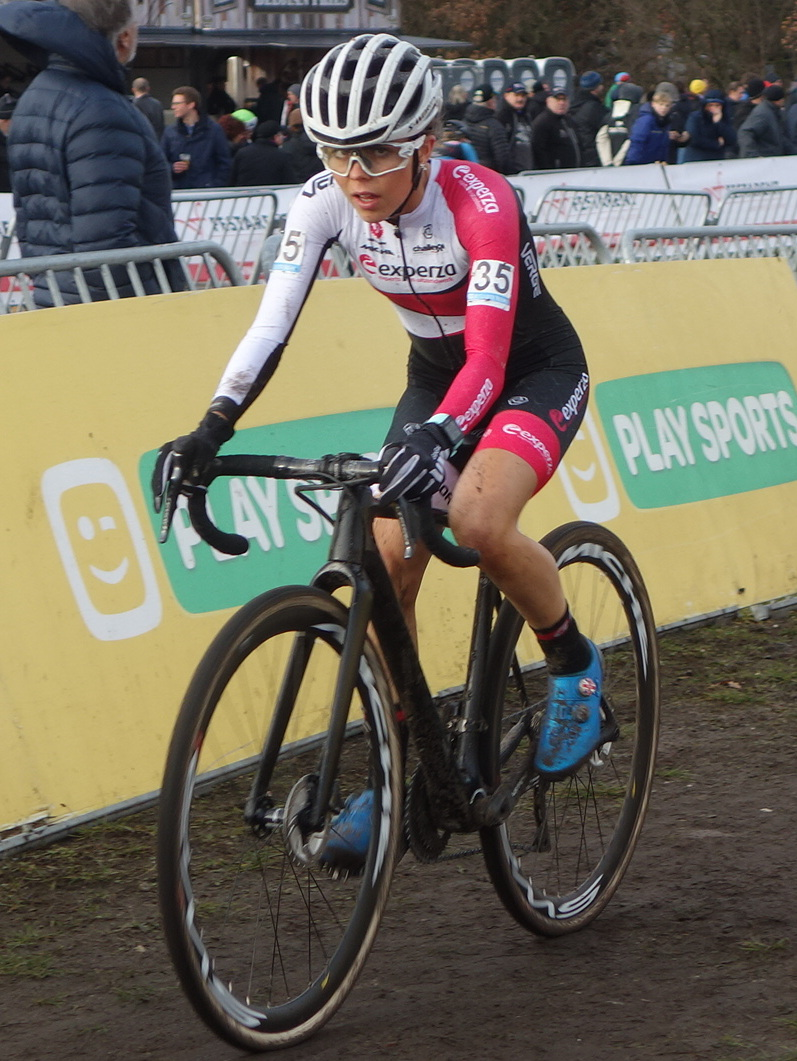
- Kay at Cyclo-cross Zonhoven in December 2019

Personal information
- Born: 6 May 1999 (age 27) Gateshead, England, UK
- Height: 5 ft 1 in (155 cm)

Cycling career
- Sport: Cycling
- Current team: 777
- Discipline: Cyclo-cross
- Role: Rider

Professional teams
- 2018: Storey Racing
- 2019: Experza–Footlogix
- 2020–2022: Starcasino
- 2023–: 777

Major wins
- Cyclo-cross National Championships (2024)
Medal record
Women's cyclo-cross
Representing Great Britain
World Championships
Silver medal – second place	2023 Hoogerheide	Team relay
Silver medal – second place	2024 Tábor	Team relay

Anna Kay (born 6 May 1999) is a British professional cyclist who specializes in cyclo-cross. She won the silver medal in the under-23 race at the 2019 European Cyclo-cross Championships, and bronze at the women's under-23 race at the 2020 UCI Cyclo-cross World Championships.

== Major results ==
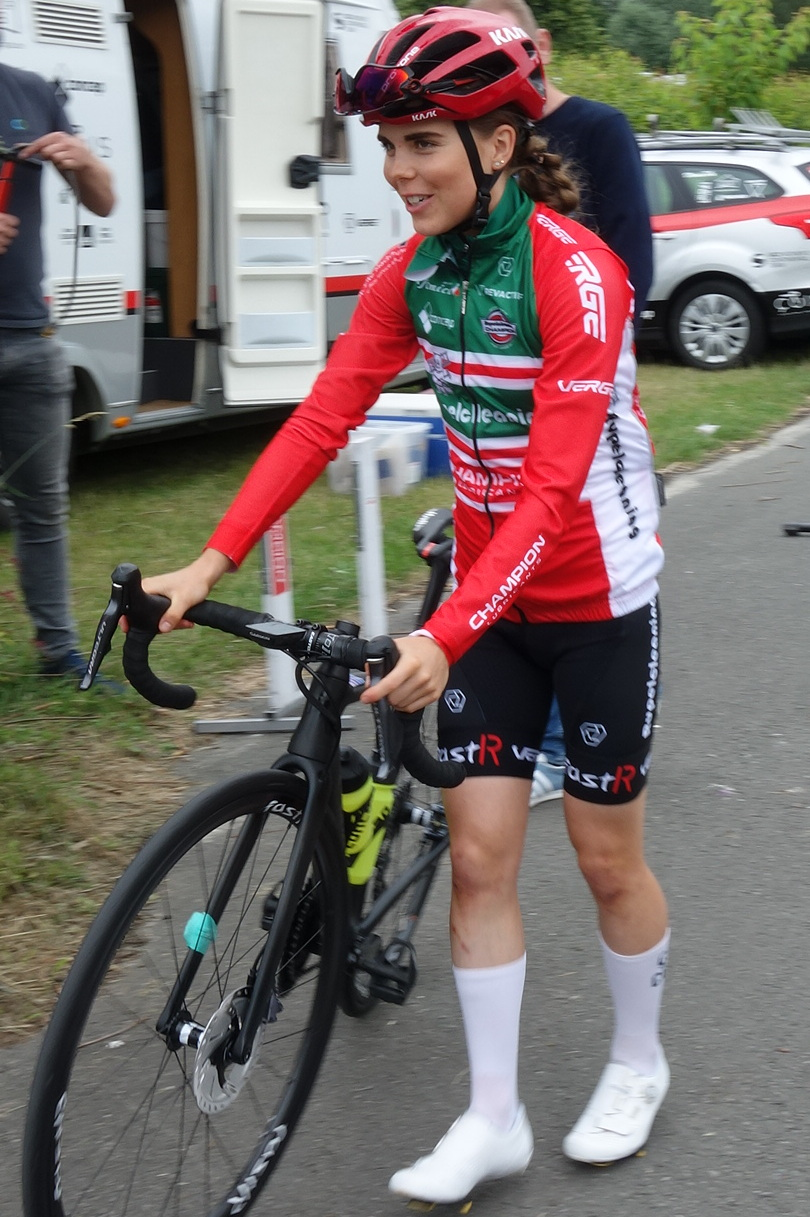
Anna Kay at the Lotto Belgium Tour in June 2021

=== Cyclo-cross ===
2017–2018
3rd Overall National Trophy Series

2nd Ipswich
3rd Derby
3rd Abergavenny

3rd National Under-23 Championships
2018–2019
2nd Overall National Trophy Series

1st Crawley
2nd Derby
2nd Ipswich
2nd Shrewsbury
3rd Irvine

2nd National Championships
2019–2020
2nd UEC European Under-23 Championships
Ethias Cross

2nd Bredene
3rd Eeklo
3rd Essen

3rd UCI World Under-23 Championships
3rd National Championships
UCI World Cup

3rd Bern

3rd Overall UCI Under-23 World Cup
3rd Otegem
2021–2022
Ethias Cross

1st Leuven
3rd Essen

National Trophy Series

1st Broughton Hall

3rd National Championships
2022–2023
National Trophy Series

1st Derby
1st South Shields

1st Clonmel
2nd Team relay, UCI World Championships
2023–2024
1st National Championships
National Trophy Series

1st Thornton in Craven

1st Overall Hope Supercross

1st Houghton-le-Spring
1st Bradford
1st Barnoldswick

2nd Team relay, UEC European Championships
X²O Badkamers Trophy

3rd Koppenberg

=== Mountain bike ===
2021
National XC Series

1st Monmouth
2nd Ringwood

2nd Cross-country, National Under-23 Championships
2023
2nd Marathon, National Championships

=== Road ===
2018
4th Road race, National Championships
2019
9th Erondegemse Pijl
