= Jack Clarkson (cyclist) =

British cyclo-cross cyclist

Personal information
- Born: 10 July 1993 (age 33) Nottingham, Nottinghamshire, England

Cycling career
- Sport: Cycling
- Discipline: Cyclo-cross
- Role: Rider

Amateur team
- 2016: VCUK PH-Mas Cycling Team

Jack Clarkson (born 10 July 1993) is a British cyclo-cross cyclist. He represented his nation in the men's elite event at the 2016 UCI Cyclo-cross World Championships in Heusden-Zolder.

== Major results ==
2014–2015
2nd National Under-23 Championships
2015–2016
3rd National Championships
National Trophy Series

3rd Southampton
