= Ian Field =

British cyclo-cross cyclist

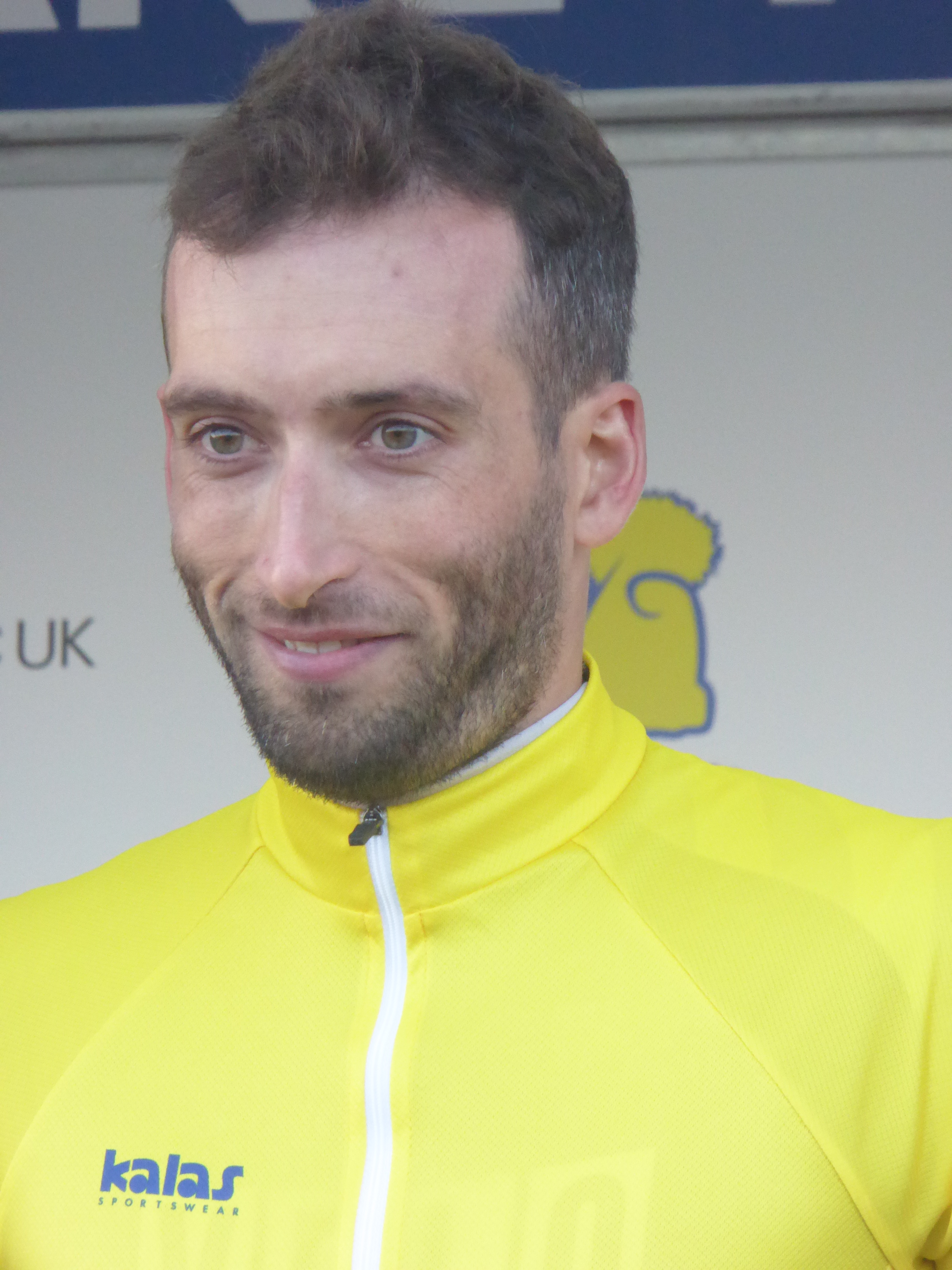
- Field in 2018

Personal information
- Born: 18 June 1986 (age 40) Ashford, Kent, England

Cycling career
- Sport: Cycling
- Current team: Retired
- Disciplines: Cyclo-cross; Mountain biking; Road
- Role: Rider

Amateur teams
- 2005–2018: Hargroves Cycles
- 2018–2020: Neon-Velo
- 2020–2021: Spectra Racing

Major wins
- Cyclo-cross National Championships (2012, 2013, 2014, 2015, 2017)

Ian Field (born 18 June 1986) is a British former cyclo-cross cyclist. He represented his nation in the men's elite event at the 2016 UCI Cyclo-cross World Championships in Heusden-Zolder.

He has won the British National Cyclo-cross Championships on five occasions.

He now is head coach of VELD Coaching a coaching company set up by himself during 2020, he has coached many young cyclo-cross riders in the United Kingdom to British National Cyclo-cross Championships success. He has also coached Tudor Pro Cycling Team rider Matteo Trentin

== Major results ==
=== Cyclo-cross ===
2004–2005
2nd National Under-23 Championships
2005–2006
National Trophy Series

1st Abergavenny
3rd Cheltenham

2006–2007
National Trophy Series

1st Cheltenham

2007–2008
National Trophy Series

1st Bradford
3rd Ipswich

2nd National Under-23 Championships
2008–2009
National Trophy Series

1st Abergavenny
2nd Rutland
3rd Ipswich
3rd Exeter

2010–2011
National Trophy Series

1st Southampton
1st Bradford

2011–2012
1st National Championships
1st Burlington, VT
1st Baltimore
2nd Rochester, NY
2nd Baltimore
2nd Breinigsville
3rd Gloucester, MA
2012–2013
1st National Championships
National Trophy Series

1st Abergavenny
2nd Derby

2nd Baltimore
2nd Baltimore
2013–2014
1st National Championships
National Trophy Series

1st Milton Keynes
1st Bradford

2014–2015
1st National Championships
National Trophy Series

1st Shrewsbury
1st Southampton
1st Bradford
2nd Derby

2015–2016
National Trophy Series

1st Southampton
1st Derby
1st Durham
1st Bradford

2nd National Championships
2016–2017
1st National Championships
1st Overall National Trophy Series

1st Abergavenny
1st Houghton-Le-Spring
1st Shrewsbury
2nd Derby
2nd Ipswich

1st Ripley
2017–2018
1st Overall National Trophy Series

1st Derby
1st Shrewsbury
2nd Abergavenny
3rd Gravesend

2nd National Championships
2018–2019
1st Overall National Trophy Series

1st Irvine
2nd Ipswich
2nd Shrewsbury
3rd Crawley

2019–2020
2nd Overall National Trophy Series

1st Milnthorpe
2nd Irvine

2021–2022
National Trophy Series

2nd Callendar Park
3rd Derby
