= Alpina (bicycle parts company) =

Bicycle parts company

Coordinates: 53.573688°N 2.877933°W

Alpina is a bicycle parts brand that manufactures handlebars, cranksets, chainrings, wheels and other components for track and road bikes. It was founded by Terry Dolan of Dolan Bikes.

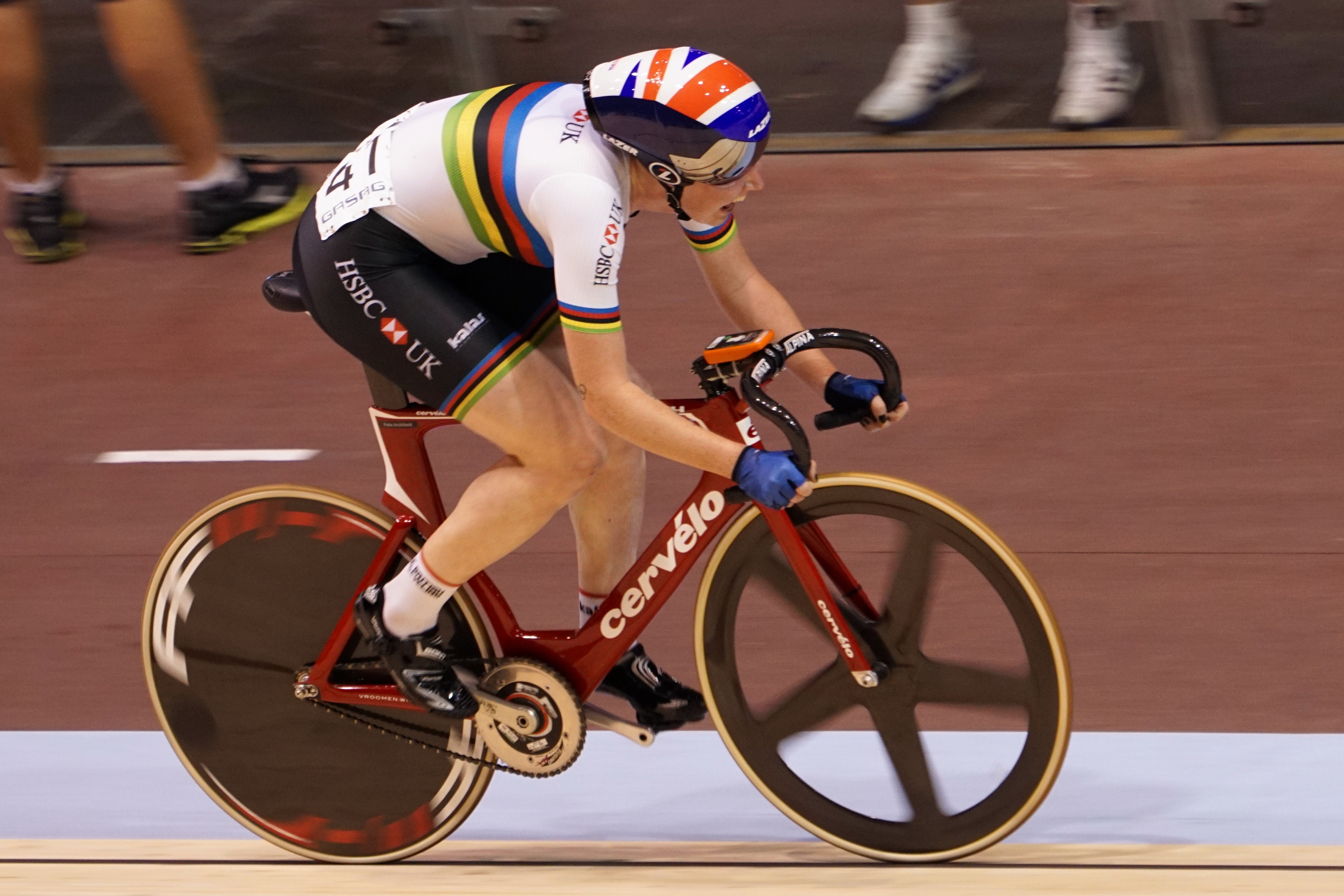
Katie Archibald with Alpina track bars on her winning track bike.

Alpina bars have been used by many British Olympic winning medallists on the track including Sir Chris Hoy, Victoria Pendleton, Katie Archibald and Laura Kenny.
