= Ella Maclean-Howell =

British cyclist (born 2004)

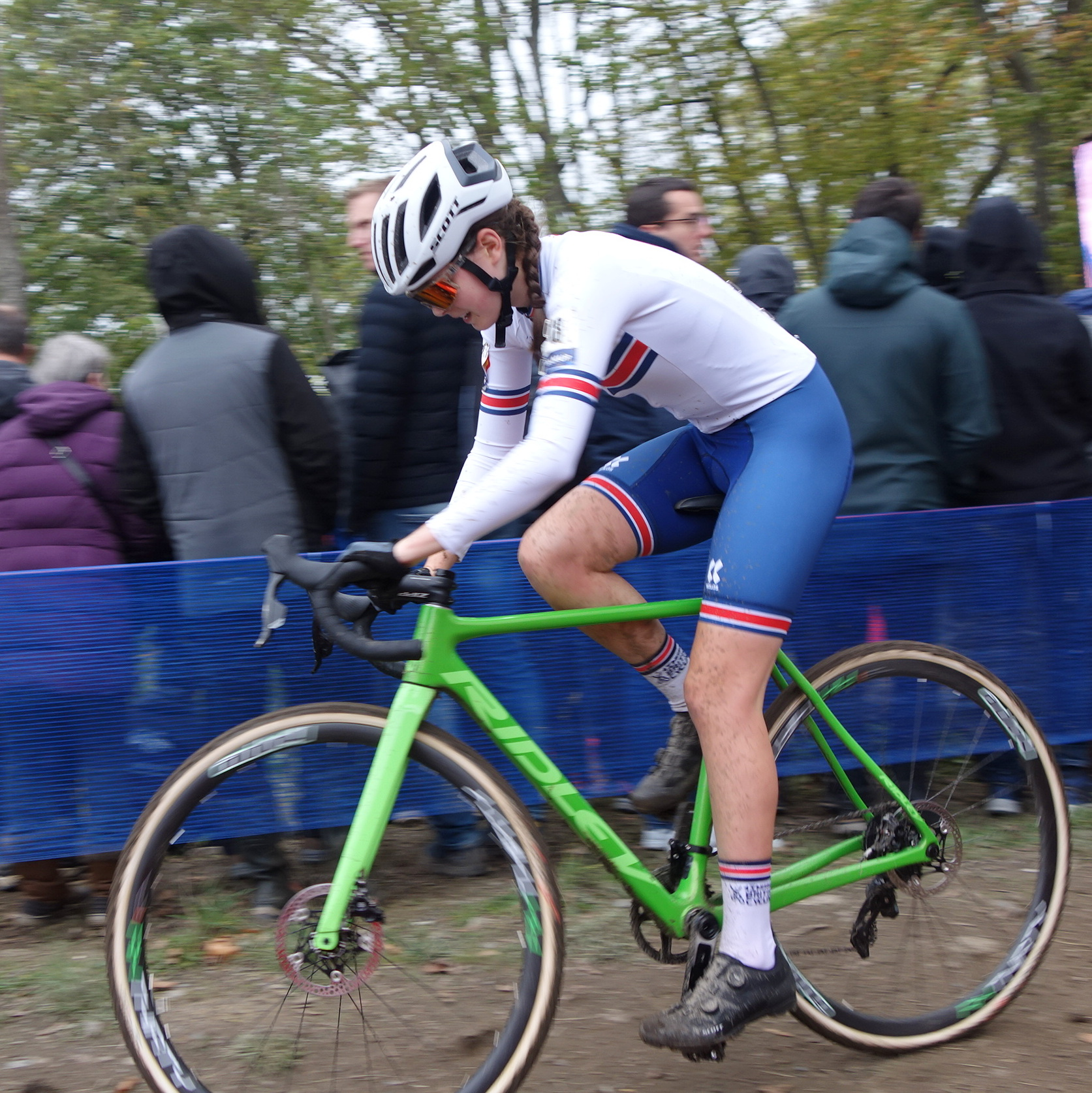
- Maclean-Howell in 2022

Personal information
- Born: 1 September 2004 (age 22) Llantrisant, Wales

Cycling career
- Sport: Cycling
- Disciplines: Cross-country, Cyclo-cross
- Role: Rider
Medal record
Women's mountain bike racing
Representing Great Britain
World Championships
Silver medal – second place	2024 Vallnord	U–23 cross-country short track

Ella MacLean-Howell (born 1 September 2004) is a British mountain bike cross country cyclist and cyclo-cross competitor from Wales.

== Early life ==
From Llantrisant in Wales, she rode as a youngster for Maindy Flyers and Cardiff J.I.F. She finished third in the girls under-16s race at the National Cyclo-Cross Championships in Gravesend in 2019. She competed at the 2022 UCI World Mountain Bike Championships, where she finished 5th in the junior race.

== Career ==
In February 2023, she finished sixteenth at the UCI Cyclo-cross World Championships in Hoogerheide, in the Netherlands. In May 2023, she won third round of the National Cross-country Series in Winchester.

She finished second in the senior race, and won the under-23 title, at the British National Cyclo-Cross Championships in January 2024.

In April 2024, she won the elite short track and Olympic title in the opening round of the National Cross-country Series in Kirroughtree.

Competing at the 2024 UEC European MTB Championships, Maclean-Howell won a silver medal in the women’s U23 XCC race in May 2024. At the same championship, she finished fourth place in the under-23 women’s Olympic cross-country race.

In June 2024, she was selected for the British team to compete in the cross-country race at the 2024 Paris Olympics.

== Major results ==
=== Cyclo-cross ===
2021–2022
1st National Junior Championships
1st Overall Junior National Trophy Series

1st Derby
1st Milnthorpe
1st Callender Park
1st Sunderland
1st Broughton Hall

1st Junior Clanfield
4th UCI World Junior Championships
2022–2023
National Trophy Series

1st Broughton Hall
2nd Gravesend

1st Clanfield
3rd National Championships
2023–2024
National Trophy Series

1st Bradford

2nd National Championships

=== Mountain bike ===
2022
1st Cross-country, National Junior Championships
UCI Junior Series

1st Heubach
2nd Banyoles
3rd Nals

Junior National Series

1st Fowey

5th Cross-country, UCI World Junior Championships
2023
1st Cross-country, National Under-23 Championships
National Series

1st Winchester
2nd Margam
2nd Fowey

2024
1st Cross-country, National Under-23 Championships
Under-23 French Cup

1st Marseille–Luminy

National Series

1st Kirroughtree

UCI World Under-23 Championships

2nd Short track
5th Cross-country

UCI Under-23 XCC World Cup

2nd Nové Město

4th Cross-country, UEC European Under-23 Championships
UCI Under-23 XCO World Cup

5th Crans-Montana
5th Les Gets
