= Dolan Bikes =

British bicycle manufacturer

Coordinates: 53.573688°N 2.877933°W

- Founder: Terry Dolan
- Headquarters: Ormskirk, West Lancashire, England
- Products: Bicycles
- Website: dolan-bikes.com

Dolan Bikes is a British bicycle manufacturer founded by Terry Dolan. They mainly produce racing bicycles that are used by teams such as An Post–Sean Kelly. Dolan bikes also owns the brands Alpina, Cougar and ADV.

Terry Dolan started working for Harry Quinn Cycles in 1977 and in 1980 he set up his own business in Walton Liverpool when Harry Quinn closed.

Dolan Bikes are famous for their track bikes and riders have won many Olympic medals on their bikes. The Alpina bars and wheels have also been used on many winning bikes – Olympic and European/World Championships. Medal winners on Dolan bikes include Chris Hoy, Bradley Wiggins, Katie Archibald and Mark Cavendish.

Dolan builds a range of road bikes with for Road, Gravel, TT and Endurance models.

== Man vs Machine ==
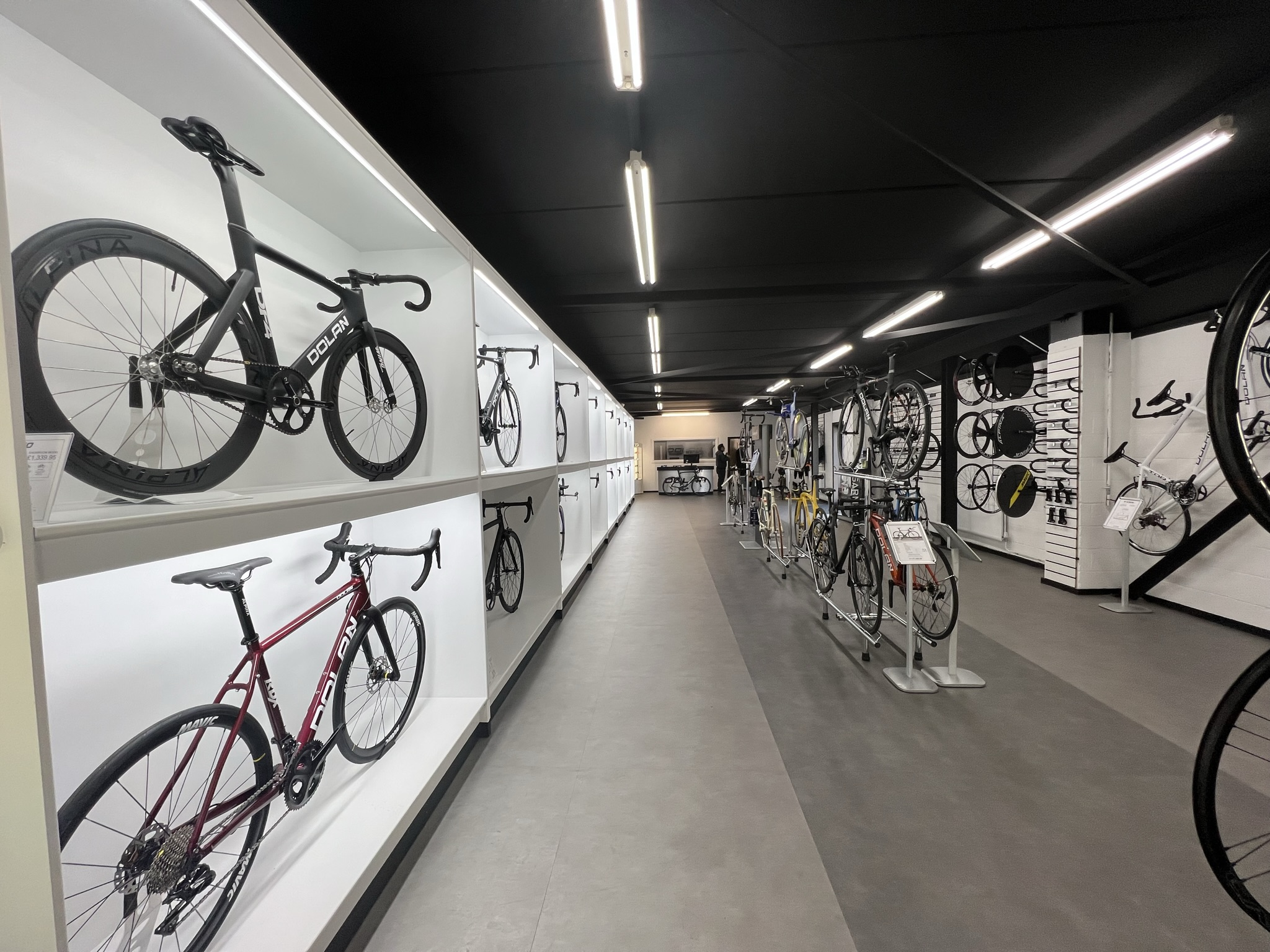
Showroom in Burscough

On 1 December 2008, Sir Chris Hoy and Sir Lewis Hamilton were set to face off with Hamilton driving a Mercedes SLR and Hoy on a Dolan Track bike in a showcase event at the Race of Champions at Wembley. In the end the event was cancelled due to rainfall which made the track unsafe.

== Sir Chris Hoy record attempts ==
Scottish track racer Chris Hoy raced a Dolan bike in La Paz, Bolivia to attempt to break world kilometre record on 13 May 2007. Hoy missed out by 0.005 seconds. He did break the 500m record by over a second.

== Charity ==
In 2013, Fearne Cotton, Miranda Hart, Russell Howard, Patrick Kielty, Davina McCall, David Walliams and Jimmy Carr cycled from Lands End to John O'Groats in 82 hours to raise £1m for charity on Dolan bikes.

In 2008, Sir Chris Hoy sent 22 Dolan sponsored Track Bikes to help cyclists in Bolivia.
