= Percy Stallard =

English cyclist

Personal information
- Full name: Percy Thornley Stallard
- Born: 19 July 1909 Wolverhampton, United Kingdom
- Died: 11 August 2001 (aged 92)

Cycling career
- Sport: Cycling
- Discipline: Road
- Role: Rider & Coach

Amateur teams
- 1927–1942: Wolverhampton Wheelers CC
- 1943–1959: British League of Racing Cyclists

Percy Thornley Stallard (19 July 1909 – 11 August 2001) was an English racing cyclist who reintroduced massed-start road racing on British roads in the 1940s.

Born in Wolverhampton, at his father's boarding house in Broad Street which later became his bike shop, Stallard became a member of the Wolverhampton Wheelers Cycling club and a keen competitor in cycle races, competing for Great Britain in international races during the 1930s, including three consecutive world championships (1933–1935). He was also a successful cycling coach and team captain.

== Racing career ==
Percy Stallard joined Wolverhampton Wheelers and rode his first race on 8 May 1927, when he was 17. The competition was a 10-mile individual time trial on a course described as "the Cannock road". By the end of the season he progressed to riding 50-mile (80 km) events and the following year to a 12-hour endurance race

He rode only time-trials until 1932, when his papers suggest he may have ridden in local grass-track meetings or perhaps on a hard velodrome. He could also have tried cyclo-cross because that year he also took part in a race between cyclists and runners, traditionally held on cross-country courses. Track races became more common from 1933.

=== Brooklands and the world championship ===
Lone racing against the clock was a British speciality and in 1932 Frank Southall came sixth in the Olympic Games cycling road race in Los Angeles when it was run that way. Shortly after came an announcement that henceforth the Olympics would be run as a massed-start event, a form of racing which (see below) the British cycling authorities had banned since the 19th century and at which British riders therefore had no experience.

The magazine Cycling wrote:

"The strongest possible protest ought to be made by the English delegates both to the UCI (Union Cycliste Internationale) and the Olympic committees against the recent decision by the UCI that the Olympic road-race for 1936 is to be a massed-start affair. The Olympic Games were the last stronghold of the genuine international trial of road-riding, free from tactics or bunching. (Note: "Bunching" was the term for riders sitting in the slipstream of others while riding in a bunch or pack of riders. British opinion held that it distorted the race because riders fresh from never having taken the lead could sprint by at the finish.)

Confronted by a decision it could not get reversed, the British governing body, the National Cyclists' Union (NCU), allowed the Charlotteville Cycling Club in Guildford, Surrey, to organise a series of races on the Brooklands car circuit. The largest, on 17 June 1933, was billed as the 100-Kilometre Massed-Start World Cycling Championship Trial and the NCU said it would choose its next team for the world championship based on the outcome. The organiser was Vic Jenner and the business manager Bill Mills, two international riders. Mills went on to start the weekly magazine The Bicycle as a rival to Cycling. A crowd put at 10,000 watched a "race like kick-and-rush football, tactics limited to random and eccentric attacking by the best, hanging on for the rest."

Stallard recalled:

The test hill (Note: The test hill at Brooklands was so-called because cars were tested on it; officials said it was a 25 per cent gradient) that you had to go up five times was that steep that on the first lap I pulled my foot out of my toe clips and I ran up. I was in the lead then and several other riders passed me. Well, I couldn't get back on my bike at that steep angle, so I ran past these other riders and won the prime [intermediate prize] at the top, running!

— Percy Stallard, "Up the League, Winning magazine"

Stallard was chosen for the 1933 UCI Road World Championships team and finished 11th, the best of the British entry. The British favourite had been Frank Southall, but although his speed got him into the group of 38 leading riders, his inability to change pace on the shallow rises of the Autodrome de Linas-Montlhéry near Montlhéry, gave him difficulties. The writer and race organiser, Chas Messenger, wrote:

You could see the difference between our time-triallists and the Continentals; we tended to steamroller over it while the Continentals honked up [rode standing on the pedals] and so on every lap, once over the top, our lads had to make up the leeway.

— Percy Stallard,

Southall eventually abandoned and the other rider, Jack Salt, who had won at Brooklands, came 21st and last. Stallard and the team created interest in France. Stallard said: "The trip to France was a real education to me, and during my short stay I learnt more about bike racing than I had done during my six years as a time-triallist. I went equipped with a 20-inch 'contraption' that may well have been the latest design 20 years earlier, but certainly not later. My handlebars were really the things that fascinated most. They were a lovely pair of 19½-inch Highgates, and when referring to the antediluvian equipment of the English team, the French Press likened my bars to a pair of 'cow's horns.'"

Next year, in the 1934 UCI Road World Championships at Leipzig, Stallard was selected to ride with Charles Holland and Fred Ghilks. Their accompanying official from the National Cyclists' Union was from Herne Hill Velodrome in south London and knew little of road-racing. The circuit was nearly six miles round, to be covered 12 times. The marshalling was by Brownshirts. The race averaged 26 mph with one lap at nearly 30. Holland rode 60 of the 70 miles with three broken spokes and came fourth. Stallard and Ghilks finished over two minutes later, Stallard seventh and Ghilks 26th. The race was won by Kees Pellenaars of the Netherlands, who went on to manage the Dutch team in the Tour de France.

=== First road race ===
Stallard had never ridden a massed event on the open road in Britain. The English cycle-racing authorities had, since the end of the 19th century, banned racing on the roads, fearing the police would ban all cycling as a result. The National Cyclists' Union, the governing body, demanded races be held only on tracks and, later, on circuits such as airfields that were closed to traffic. Although time trials (races between individuals competing against the clock) had started as a revolt against the NCU's ban – the races were held at dawn on courses kept secret from the public with riders dressed from head to toe in black to complete the secrecy – there were no races on open roads between riders starting together.

In June 1936, though, the Isle of Man allowed a race over one lap of the motorcycling Snaefell mountain course. The island is a separate jurisdiction from the United Kingdom and did not fall under British police control. The island also saw the race as a potential tourist attraction. In time the race, expanded to three laps and known as the Manx International, became the main event within a week of cycling festivities that followed the motorcycling week.

The 1936 race was spectacular for the crashes that it produced, because for the first time riders were required to negotiate everyday winding streets rather than the smooth bends of a motor-racing course. Stallard finished 17th and inspired by what he had ridden. There were more races on car circuits and airfields – Stallard won the last race at Brooklands, in 1939 – but to Stallard they were just a shadow of the real thing.

== Campaign for road racing ==
When the Second World War began later that year, the roads emptied because of petrol rationing. Stallard insisted that if there were few or no other road-users, massed racing on the road was unlikely to bring objections. He wrote in December 1941 to A. P. Chamberlin of the NCU:

It is amazing to think that this is the only country in Europe where this form of sport is not permitted... There seems to be the mistaken idea that it would be necessary to close the roads. This, of course, is entirely wrong... There would be no better time than now to introduce this form of racing to the roads, what with the decreased amount of motor traffic and the important part that the cycle is playing in wartime transport.

— Percy Stallard, 1941

Chamberlin was not impressed. Stallard protested that the airfields and car circuits which were the only place that the NCU would allow massed racing had been taken by the army and RAF. On Easter Monday 1942 he called a meeting at the foot of Long Mynd, a hill in Shropshire that was popular with cyclists, and announced his plan for a 59-mile race from Llangollen to Wolverhampton on 7 June.

I just explained to the police what I was doing and told them that things like that were normal on the Continent, and they said they were happy and that they'd try to help

— Percy Stallard, 1989.

He obtained sponsorship from the Wolverhampton Express and Star newspaper, offered any profits to the newspaper's Forces Comfort Fund, and recruited 40 riders to take part.

=== Opposition and suspension ===
His plan brought strong opposition from the cycling establishment, particularly from the veteran administrator and writer George Herbert Stancer. His fear, and that of the NCU, was that asking the police for permission to hold a race ended the freedom of cyclists to hold races, or at any rate lone races against the clock, without interference.

Under the headline A hopeless revolt, George Herbert Stancer wrote:

"They have plunged into their dangerous experiment without regard for the consequences... I understand that the 'rebels' want to go on holding races by police permit and under police protection; and when this is withdrawn they are apparently content to put up the shutters and go out of business as promoters.... If we voluntarily place road-racing under police control, we sign its death warrant.... If we are to race on the road, for heaven's sake let us do it as free citizens, and not by permission of the police."

Stancer's words influenced the NCU and it banned Stallard before the race had started. An agreement with the Road Time Trials Council meant that it too banned him. Stallard argued later that the race was not against the NCU's rules, which said: "Massed start races will be permitted only under the most exceptional circumstances, e.g. if the police and/or other authorities either close the roads or give in writing their official approval of the race being run." The police, he said, had approved his race and would help on the day. The NCU, on the other hand, pointed out that Stallard's letters to chief constables had referred not to a massed-start race but to a "cycling event."

Stallard went ahead with the event on 7 June 1942 and it finished, without incident, in front of a crowd at West Park. Cycling reported:

"More than a thousand people watched the finish of the massed-start race organised by Percy Stalland, from Llangollen to Wolverhampton, on Sunday afternoon. The Chief Constable of Wolverhampton, an inspector, a sergeant and 15 uniformed policemen kept the crowd back. Police cars and police motorcyclists patrolled portions of the course. A police motorcyclist led the racing men through the streets to the finish. E. A. Price, of Wolverhampton, won the sprint from his clubmate, C. J. Anslow"

The report – in which the frequent mention of the police reflected the magazine's concerns as expressed by Stancer – went on to explain that the race had been banned by the NCU and by the time-trialling body, the Road Time Trials Council, but that there had been no incidents other than a lorry backing on to the course. Fifteen riders finished and all those involved in the race were suspended by the NCU. Stallard was banned indefinitely for refusing to account for himself to the NCU's management. The suspension, often referred to as "for life" was in fact sine die, meaning without defined end but allowing Stallard to appeal. The weekly magazine, The Bicycle, apologised to the NCU on 20 May 1942 for misreporting the penalty as a life suspension, although the consequence proved the same because Stallard did not appeal and the ban was never lifted.

== British League of Racing Cyclists ==
With nowhere to go but insistent that massed racing was the future, Stallard was instrumental in creating a breakaway organisation, the British League of Racing Cyclists. It was formed in November that year, bringing together regional groups already forming in the Midlands and the North. Stallard won the 1944 BLRC championship, and served as events organiser for a time, before being expelled for criticising the standard of events. He was also a moving force behind organisation of the fledgling Tour of Britain.

Stallard remained bitter about the NCU and even his own invention, the BLRC, for the rest of his life.

I have often sat back and thought just how nice it would be if you could relive your life based on the experience gained. For myself, I would never again try to achieve the impossible by trying to change things. On the two occasions I have tried to do this [he tried to introduce age-related racing for riders older than 40], I have failed, not because I lack followers, or because of the opposition of opposing bodies, but because of the activities of anarchists and those who are envious of your success and popularity.

— Percy Stallard, 1989.

His criticism of the BLRC and its standards of race organisation led to his being briefly suspended from the organisation he had helped to found.

In 1959, the NCU and the BLRC agreed to merge, by which time both had become mentally and financially exhausted by their civil war. Stallard saw the merger as treason by "just three people [who] were allowed the freedom to destroy the BLRC" and until his death saw the new British Cycling Federation (BCF) as a reincarnation of the NCU.

His assistant at his cycle shop, Ralph Jones, was the BLRC delegate at an international meeting in Spain which recognised the BCF as Britain's national body. Stallard sacked him the next day he came into work. Jones had finished sixth in Stallard's race from Llangollen to Wolverhampton.

=== London-Holyhead ===
Percy Stallard believed not only that Britain could have racing and a race like the Tour de France but he was inspired by the distance of events such as Bordeaux–Paris and on Saturday 9 June 1951 organised a race from London to Holyhead. It started from Marble Arch at 5 am and finished 267 miles later in Holyhead. Thirty-five riders were listed at the start, all professionals or semi-professionals (known as independents – the BLRC, contrary to the other cycling bodies in Britain, had promoted the idea of independent riders, who were intended to be trying their hand in professional racing while not yet committing themselves to leaving the amateur class). The BLRC official and historian Chas Messenger wrote:

Twenty-eight started out of the 35 listed at the crack of dawn from Marble Arch, sent on their way by Lord Donegal, who was later to become president of the League [BLRC]. In a sea of mist, they wafted up the Edgware Road and on the other side of Dunstable came the first attack which split the field in three..."

At the finish at Holyhead:

"No quarter asked, no quarter given as they tore on to the Promenade... [Les] Scales sprinted 'like the clappers' and took the race by two lengths from [Geoff] Clark and [Fred] Nicholls at a length. Bravo Percy!"

The race continued until the 1960s, organised by Stan Kite, until it fell foul of traffic on the main A5 road – riders sometimes had to stop at traffic lights – and international limits on race distances.

== League of Veteran Racing Cyclists ==
Stallard rode his last race when he was 56, in Doncaster. Racing as he grew older became difficult because the British Cycling Federation's rules classed all riders as veterans when they passed 40. Stallard argued that veterans' races should be organised in age-groups and he clashed again with cycling authorities by forming an organisation to make that possible.

He drew up the rules from a hospital bed in 1985, when he was having a hip replaced, and the League of Veteran Racing Cyclists (LVRC) began in 1986. This time, the rest of cycling left him to it.

Stallard fell out with the organisation he had founded, saying in his private papers that the LVRC was not "up to expectation" and adding:

It is little wonder that it was three years before an executive committee was convened, and even then neither the chairman or secretary were able to attend. The fact that no copies of the regulations have been made available since I printed and distributed the original in 1986 does not appear to worry anyone.

— Percy Stallard, Private papers,

In June 1989 he wrote to the journalist Les Woodland: "I regret very much my endeavour on behalf of age-related [racing]. While there is a definite call for this type of riding, a big majority of the LVRC membership look upon the organisation as a means of providing them with a few extra races, nothing more, and have no allegiance to it whatever."

== Refusal of honour ==
In 1988, the BCF offered Stallard its gold medal for services to the sport. The magazine Cycling wrote: "Are we being over-optimistic in believing that the bitterness caused by the rift of the Forties and Fifties has now faded away?" Cycling was indeed being overoptimistic: Stallard refused the medal. Cycling reported:

"His initial response was favourable, but now he has written to federation secretary Len Unwin, declining the nomination and an invitation to the annual dinner in December. He [Stallard] wrote: 'Whatever the award is intended for, whether it is my activities of 48 years ago, or my present struggle on behalf of age-related racing, the significance of the award is nil as it does not open the locked doors of the BCF to me or to anyone else with progressive ideas.'"

Stallard believed that he had never been asked to manage a British team or take a national position in the sport because former NCU officials ran the BCF and resented what he had done. Just before his death on 11 August 2001, Stallard wrote:

The life suspension inflicted upon me by the NCU is still very much in evidence, whatever the BCF may say. If this is not so, why did they never ask me to manage a British team abroad? After all, I am the only person to have led a British team to individual and team success in the Warsaw-Berlin-Prague Peace Race, then again as the only official accompanying and directing four riders against a team of 117 Mexicans (Tour of Mexico 1952]; our third individual and third team was equal to our WBP achievement.

— Percy Stallard, 1 August 2001.

== Later life ==
Stallard continued cycling into his eighties. In 1965, he rode alone over the Theodul Pass between Zermatt in Switzerland and Italy. The Rough Stuff Fellowship, an organisation for enthusiasts of cross-country cycling, acknowledged that it was probably the first time a cyclist had done it. The pass is 10,976 feet high and Stallard made it in less than 15 hours, sometimes through deep snow.

He also walked over Mount Whitney, at 14,496 feet, in the US, but came close to dying after running out of water while walking down into the Grand Canyon and back out again along mule tracks. He also crossed the Sierra Nevada in four days of 1973.

He travelled 25,000 miles across America by Greyhound bus and organised more than 100 coach trips for fellow walking enthusiasts.

His life ended riddled with regret. He wrote:

Probably the best six months of my life were looking after the wife of a cycling friend who had died of cancer. She asked me to see her through the ordeal, and though she had stated on a number of occasions that she did not know how she would have managed without my support, immediately she returned to normality, without ceremony she flapped her wings and flew away to greener fields! This episode in my life, even at this late stage, has taught me that one should never expect appreciation for their efforts whatever they may be.

— Percy Stallard,

He died leaving three children, Mick, Yvonne and Olwyn. He divorced in the 1960s. His brother Dennis, lived in Perth, Western Australia.

== Personality ==
Stallard had the most abrasive nature that I have ever met. He could never believe that he could have a bad idea or make a bad decision. And sometimes he'd go berserk with those who disagreed with him. He didn't have, let us say, the delicacies of negotiation.

— Peter Bryan, editor of The Bicycle, associate of Sporting Cyclist and managing editor of Cycling

The journalist William Fotheringham remembered: "He never lost his cantankerousness or gained any respect for authority. While walking up Scafell Pike one day, he and his group were told by a warden to turn back due to thick mist; the group returned, and later met Stallard at the bus, only to be told, 'I came to climb the bloody mountain, so I went to the top.'"

Percy Stallard was a bright and energetic man with a vision for his sport but he was not a man to tolerate argument or those with other views. Having achieved what he wanted, with the NCU's final acceptance of massed racing on the road, Stallard placed the continuity of the BLRC over the end of the civil war that the BLRC and the NCU had conducted.

The NCU were running road races and we were running road races and there wasn't any need for amalgamation [of the NCU and the BLRC, to form the British Cycling Federation] at all.

— Percy Stallard.

Critics said Stallard had lost sight of the intention of the BLRC, which had been to bring racing to the open road and that, once achieved, there was no further point in rival cycling administrations. Peter Bryan, editor of The Bicycle, associate of Sporting Cyclist and managing editor of Cycling, said:

"The BLRC was originally a gang of enthusiasts. Then along came what I'd call the parliamentarians of pedal power, men who saw a runaway organisation and decided they'd take it over." Stallard was influenced by those who agreed with him but in the end he and others became too much for the BLRC's other administrators and the BLRC magazine, The Leaguer, reported in 1954: "There is a malignant ulcer prevalent in the cycling world common to all three racing bodies in this country. It is the taint of vanity and culminates in the clash of personality."

== Legacy ==
Stallard's actions cast British cycling into a civil war that lasted longer than World War II. They created a division in the sport that outlasted the foundation of the British Cycling Federation and they established an organisation, the BLRC, which is still fondly remembered by the few cyclists old enough to have competed with it.

You can never say that if it didn't happen then this wouldn't have happened, but I can't see what else [other than the BLRC] would have brought it [massed racing] about",

— Peter Bryan speaking about the NCU's agreement to license massed start races.

Stallard reintroduced massed racing to British roads for the first time since the 19th century. To the question of whether Britain would have moved to massed racing anyway, without the BLRC, Peter Bryan says not, saying that the established cycling authorities had become entrenched in their positions, their own rivalry overshadowed by their joint fears and interests.

"The NCU and the RTTC were never friends. The RTTC were particular bastards and they had so many clever men in the top echelon, many more than the NCU. They were steeped in the tradition of time-trialling and what it stood for and they wouldn't budge a jot or tickle."

Stallard's success was that he alerted the UCI to a problem in British cycling which led the UCI to threaten Britain with exclusion from world cycling unless it sorted out the conflict between the NCU and the BLRC. Seeing the BLRC as closer to the UCI's interests, it suggested it would recognise the BLRC and not the NCU as the representative body. It was because of that that the NCU relented and agreed to license the massed races it had hitherto opposed.

The League of Veteran Racing Cyclists (LVRC) holds a competition named in Stallard's memory.
