= Three Peaks Cyclo-Cross =

Annual cyclo-cross event in England

Coordinates: 54.1509°N 2.2987°W

The Three Peaks Cyclo-Cross is an annual cyclo-cross event over the Yorkshire three peaks of Ingleborough, Whernside and Pen-y-ghent, in Yorkshire, England. It is organised by Bradford Racing Cycling Club on the last weekend of September.

== Overview ==
The original course was 40 kilometres long, but was increased to 47 km in 1980. More course changes in 1982 and 1983 increased it further, to 50 km and then 57 km respectively. The most recent alteration, in 1994, extended the course to 61 km. The current course starts at Helwith Bridge, 3 km south of Horton in Ribblesdale, and tackles Ingleborough, Whernside and Pen-y-ghent. Because part of the race is on private land, cycling the whole course at any other time of year is not possible.

Except during the 1980s and early 1990s when mountain bikes were permitted, only cyclo-cross bicycles with drop handlebars are allowed. There were no female competitors until 1979.

There were no races in 2001 or 2007 due to foot and mouth disease and no races in 2020 or 2021 due to the COVID-19 pandemic.

== Awards ==
Total Prize Money: £5,000+

Riders are awarded certificates based on their time around the course.

- Elite - under 3 hours 30 minutes
- 1st class - under 4 hours
- 2nd class - under 5 hours
- merit - all other finishers

== List of overall winners ==
Year	Male Winner	Female Winner	Winning team
1961	John Rawnsley (GBR)	-	Bradford Racing Cycling Club
1962	Harry Bond (GBR)	-	Bradford Racing Cycling Club
1963	Ian Craig (GBR)	-	Bradford Racing Cycling Club
1964	Harry Bond (GBR)	-	Bradford Racing Cycling Club
1965	John Bell (GBR)	-	Bradford Racing Cycling Club
1966	Harry Bond (GBR)	-	Bradford Racing Cycling Club
1967	Harry Bond (GBR)	-	Bradford Racing Cycling Club
1968	Tom McDonald (GBR)	-	Bradford Racing Cycling Club
1969	John Atkins (GBR)	-	Bradford Racing Cycling Club
1970	John Atkins (GBR)	-	Bradford Racing Cycling Club
1971	Eric Stone (GBR)	-	Keighley St. Christopher C.C.C.
1972	Chris Wilkinson (GBR)	-	Bronte Wheelers/McManus & Poole
1973	Barry Davies (GBR)	-	Bronte Wheelers/McManus & Poole
1974	Barry Davies (GBR)	-	Bronte Wheelers/McManus & Poole
1975	Barry Davies (GBR)	-	Bronte Wheelers/McManus & Poole
1976	John Atkins (GBR)	-	Bronte Wheelers/McManus & Poole
1977	Eric Stone (GBR)	-	Bronte Wheelers/McManus & Poole
1978	Eric Stone (GBR)	-	Bronte Wheelers/McManus & Poole
1979	Eric Stone (GBR)	Brenda Atkinson (GBR)	Ron Kitching/Sun Tour
1980	John North (GBR)	Susan Hoare (GBR)	Bronte Wheelers/McManus & Poole
1981	Arthur Manz (SUI)	-	Bronte Wheelers/McManus & Poole
1982	Eric Stone (GBR)	Susan Hoare (GBR)	Bradford Racing Cycling Club
1983	Richard Bates (GBR)	-	Bradford Racing Cycling Club
1984	Tim Gould (GBR)	-	Norton Wheelers
1985	Tim Gould (GBR)	Christine Walker (GBR)	Chesterfield Coureurs/Ness
1986	Tim Gould (GBR)	Janet Sanger (GBR)	Chesterfield Coureurs/Ness
1987	Tim Gould (GBR)	-	Ace R.T./Peugeot
1988	Tim Gould (GBR)	Emma Wood (GBR)	Ace R.T./Peugeot
1989	Tim Gould (GBR)	Melanie Grivell (GBR)	Bradford Racing Cycling Club
1990	Fred Salmon (GBR)	Melanie Grivell (GBR)	Ace R.T./Peugeot
1991	Nick Craig (GBR)	Isla Rowntree (GBR)	Helwith Bridge Alers
1992	Fred Salmon (GBR)	-	Helwith Bridge Alers or Bradford Olympic R.C./Paul Milnes/Lusso
1993	Fred Salmon (GBR)	Alison Garside (GBR)	Helwith Bridge Alers or Bradford Olympic R.C./Paul Milnes/Lusso
1994	Chris Young (GBR)	Alison Garside (GBR)	Ace R.T./Peugeot or Helwith Bridge Alers
1995	Andy Peace (GBR)	Jacqui Foster (GBR)	Helwith Bridge Alers or Bradford Olympic R.C./Paul Milnes/Lusso
1996	Andy Peace (GBR)	Ruth Gamwell (GBR)	Helwith Bridge Alers
1997	Chris Young (GBR)	Mari Todd (GBR)	Pace Racing/Pace Satellite TV
1998	Chris Young (GBR)	Sue Thomas (GBR)	Team Marie Curie/Pace Satellite TV
1999	Ian Cuthbertson (GBR)	Kali Exley (GBR)	Team Marie Curie/Pace Satellite TV
2000	Rob Jebb (GBR)	Sue Thomas (GBR)	Helly Hansen - Giant - MBI
2001	No race - foot & mouth disease in the area		
2002	Rob Jebb (GBR)	Louise Robinson (GBR)	Science in Sport.com
2003	Rob Jebb (GBR)	Louise Robinson (GBR)	Wheelbase/Ron Hill
2004	Rob Jebb (GBR)	Louise Robinson (GBR)	Wheelbase/Ron Hill
2005	Rob Jebb (GBR)	Louise Robinson (GBR)	Wheelbase/Ron Hill
2006	Rob Jebb (GBR)	Isla Rowntree (GBR)	Scott UK
2007	No race - foot & mouth disease in the area		
2008	Rob Jebb (GBR)	Heather Dawe (GBR)	Wheelbase/Gore Bike Wear
2009	Nick Craig (GBR)	Renee Saxton (GBR)	Wheelbase/Cannondale/Gorebikewear
2010	Rob Jebb (GBR)	Renee Saxton (GBR)	Wheelbase/Cannondale/Gorebikewear
2011	Nick Craig (GBR)	Louise Robinson (GBR)	Crosstrax
2012	Rob Jebb (GBR)	Victoria Wilkinson (GBR)	Team Hope Factory Racing
2013	Rob Jebb (GBR)	Delia Beddis (GBR)	Jedi Cycle Sport
2014	Rob Jebb (GBR)	Verity Appleyard (GBR)	Jedi Cycle Sport
2015	Paul Oldham (GBR)	Jules Toone (GBR)	Hope Factory Racing
2016	Paul Oldham (GBR)	Delia Beddis (GBR)	Hope Factory Racing
2017	Paul Oldham (GBR)	Christina Wiejak (GBR)	Hope Factory Racing
2018	Paul Oldham (GBR)	Christina Wiejak (GBR)	Hope Factory Racing
2019	Rob Jebb (GBR)	Kerry MacPhee (GBR)	Hope Factory Racing
2020 to 2021	No races due to COVID-19 pandemic		
2022	Rob Jebb (GBR)	Victoria Peel (GBR)	Hope Factory Racing
2023	Giles Drake (GBR)	Bryony Halcrow (GBR)	Hope Factory Racing
2024	Giles Drake (GBR)	Bryony Halcrow (GBR)	Hope Factory Racing

(source: "Results and Roll of Honour", 3 Peaks Cyclo-cross official website)
