= Emily Wadsworth =

British cyclist

Personal information
- Full name: Emily Jill Wadsworth
- Born: 8 August 1999 (age 27)

Cycling career
- Sport: Cycling
- Disciplines: Road; Cyclo-cross; Mountain biking
- Role: Rider

Amateur teams
- 2010–2017: Beeline Bicycles RT
- 2017–2018: 100% ME
- 2019: Brother UK–Tifosi
- 2019: UVCA Troyes

Professional teams
- 2018–2019: TP Racing
- 2020–2021: NXTG Racing

Emily Jill Wadsworth (born 8 August 1999) is a former British professional racing cyclist, last rode for UCI Women's Continental Team AG Insurance–Soudal. In October 2020, she rode in the 2020 Three Days of Bruges–De Panne race in Belgium.
