= Barrie Clarke =

Canadian soccer coach

Personal information
- Full name: Barrie Percival Clarke
- Date of birth: May 5, 1932 (age 94)
- Place of birth: Ilkeston, England
- Height: 5 ft 8 in (1.73 m)

Managerial career
- Years: Team
- 1979: Canada U-20 (interim)
- 1979–1981: Canada

Barrie Clarke (born May 5, 1932) was a Canadian professional soccer coach who was the head coach of the Canada men's national team.
