= Mick Ives =

English racing cyclist (1939–2024)

Personal information
- Born: 10 August 1939 England
- Died: 18 January 2024 (aged 84)

Cycling career
- Sport: Cycling
- Disciplines: Road & Cyclo-cross
- Role: Rider, coach, team manager

Amateur team
- 1992–1994: Saracen Cycles

Professional teams
- 1966: Mottram Cycles
- 1967: Mercian - Bantel
- 1968: Bantel - Mercian
- 1969: Bantel
- 1970: Fred Baker Cycles

Mick Ives (10 August 1939 – 18 January 2024) was an English professional racing cyclist from Coventry. Ives was the UCI World Masters Cycling Champion five times, and the British national cycling champion 62 times (with five championships won in 2007). He was at one time the manager of the Great Britain cycling team, and the National Coach, and won over 1000 races.

Ives ran the Team Jewson MI Racing Team, which he formed in 1997. The team won more than 1,000 races all over the UK and mainland Europe.

Ives became the first pensioner to complete the Tour de France route in 2005. Riding alone two days ahead of the big race itself, Ives completed the 3,608 km distance under par, in just 20 days, having ridden two of the stages in one day. He was the only rider in the world known to have completed the race route solo.

Ives died on 18 January 2024, at the age of 84.

== Palmarès ==
1960
2nd Overall, Dun Laoghaire

1st Stage 1, Dun Laoghaire
2nd Stage 2, Dun Laoghaire
2nd Stage 3, Dun Laoghaire

1964
3rd Grand Prix of Essex

1966
1st Bagshot, Cyclo-cross

1975
1st Archer Spring Road Race

2000
1st UCI Cyclo-cross World Championships, Masters, 60-64

2001
1st UCI Cyclo-cross World Championships, Masters, 60-64

2002
2nd UCI Cyclo-cross World Championships, Masters, 60-64

2003
3rd UCI Cyclo-cross World Championships, Masters, 60-64

2004
1st UCI Cyclo-cross World Championships, Masters, 65-69

2005
1st UCI Cyclo-cross World Championships, Masters, 65-69

2006
1st UCI Cyclo-cross World Championships, Masters, 65-69

2007
2nd UCI Cyclo-cross World Championships, Masters, 65-69

2012
2nd UCI Cyclo-cross World Championships, Masters, 70-74
