= Islabikes =

English bicycle manufacturer

- Company type: Private Limited Company
- Industry: Other retail specialised stores
- Founded: 2005-2023
- Founder: Isla Rowntree
- Headquarters: Stanton Lacy, Shropshire, United Kingdom
- Area served: UK, Europe
- Key people: Isla Rowntree (Managing director)
- Products: Children's and adult’s bicycle parts
- Total assets: £4,000,000
- Number of employees: 21
- Website: Islabikes

Islabikes (/ˈaɪlə/ EYE-lə /baɪks/) is an online retailer of bicycle parts and former manufacturer of specialist bicycle parts based near Ludlow in Shropshire, England. From its founding in 2005 through 2023, the company was known for children's bikes, and from 2019 they added bicycles aimed at riders over age 65. It was founded by former competitive cyclist Isla Rowntree, initially located at Claverley in east Shropshire until it moved to Bromfield near Ludlow in 2010, then Ludlow itself in 2019. It ultimately located in Stanton Lacy, Shropshire. In November 2014 the company employed 40 people. Since 2023, it has sold only parts.

Islabikes made much lighter weight bikes than usual for children's bikes, with all components designed specifically for the intended rider. In 2011 Islabikes introduced its first adult-sized model, the Beinn 29. Islabikes opened a North American headquarters in Portland, Oregon and began sales in April, 2013, but pulled out of the US market in 2018 due to uncertainty over Brexit and US regulations. The bicycles were designed in the UK and manufactured in Vietnam.

In February 2022, Islabikes announced the production of two new models for riders with dwarfism.

In October 2023 Islabikes announced it would stop production of bicycles after 18 years but will continue to supply spare parts and accessories, citing uncertain market conditions. In a press release, founder Rowntree said, "Today, it's easy to forget just how bad most children's bikes were when I started Islabikes 18 years ago", and that, "Islabikes' early success gradually gained attention from other and bigger cycling brands and, as a result of them following our lead, today good quality, well thought-out children's bikes are available from multiple places, and for me, that is a wonderful thing."

In December 2025 Islabikes announced that in addition to the continued supply of spare parts and accessories, they would occasionally release limited, one-off batches of specific models. The first batch, a small run of Cnoc 14, Cnoc 16, and Cnoc 18 learner bikes is available for sale through their website.

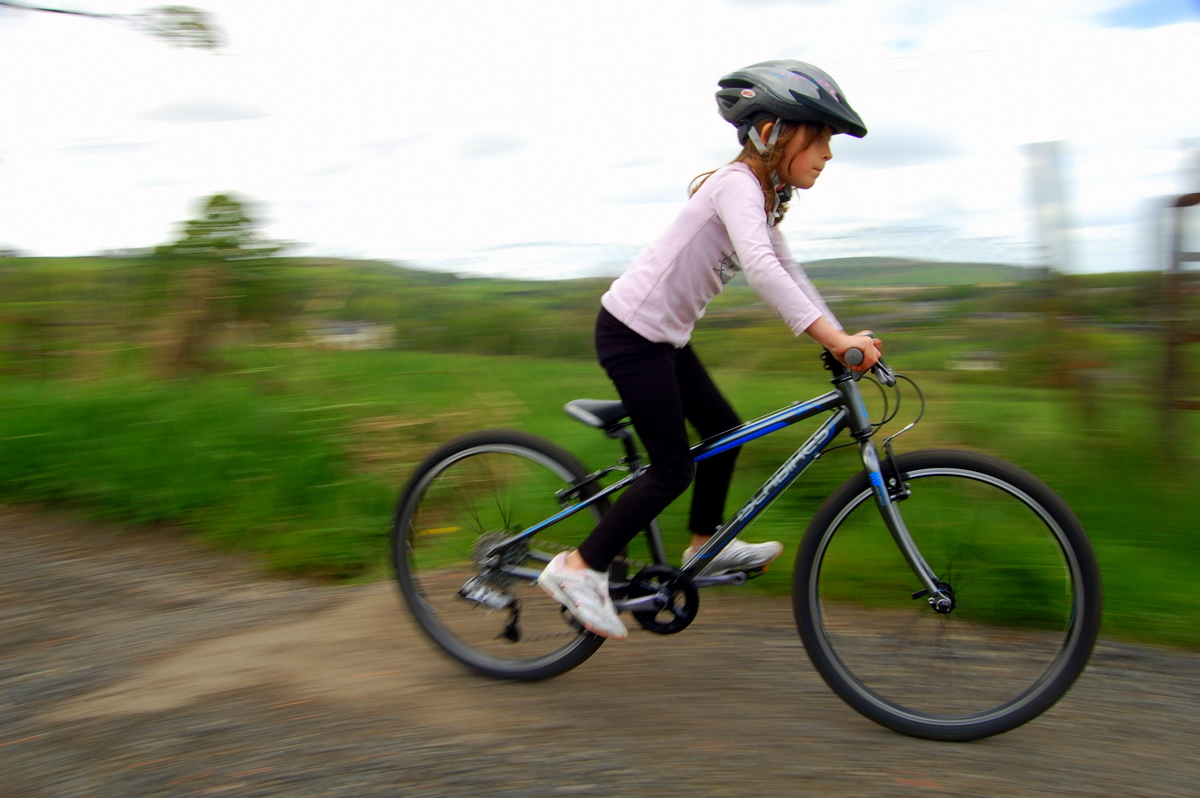
Beinn 24 model

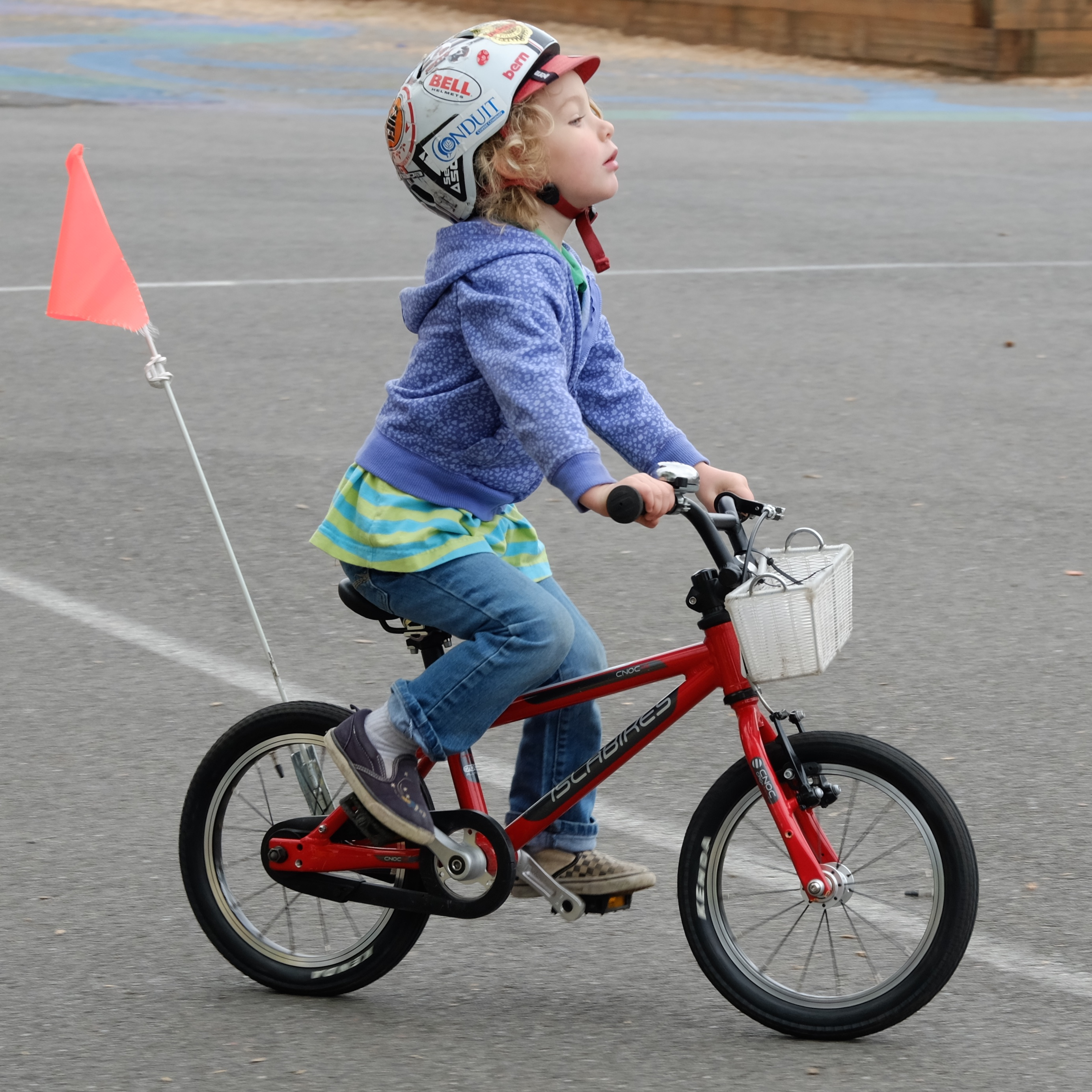
Four year old on Cnoc 14 model
