= Simon Burney =

British team manager

Simon Burney spent three years racing the professional cyclo-cross circuit before an injury forced him into team management. For over twenty years, Burney managed cyclo-cross and mountain bike teams, before joining the Union Cycliste Internationale (UCI) in a consultancy role as first a technical delegate, then as Mountain Bike Coordinator & in 2020 joined the staff as manager of the off-road department.

As a manager and the creator of the Ace Racing Team along with professional mountain bike teams throughout the 1990s, Simon was privileged to work with the finest 'cross riders of that generation: world champions Dominique Arnould and Henrik Djernis, plus Beat Wabel, and Peter Van Den Abeele, among others. Simon served as manager of the Great Britain mountain bike team in the 2000 and 2004 Olympic Games. In the 2002 and 2006 Commonwealth Games, he was manager of the English team. From 2000 to 2007, Simon worked for British Cycling as the performance manager of their mountain bike and cyclo-cross teams, and continued to manage the national team at the world championships until 2009.

The 2026 World Championships at Hulst, Netherlands was Simon's forty-fifth consecutive year at Worlds as either a rider, mechanic, team manager, TV commentator, sport coordinator or spectator.

He has written a popular book which is on its 3rd Edition named Cyclocross: Training and Technique, and has organized a round of UCI Cyclocross World Cup in Milton Keynes U.K. in 2014.

In 2022 he joined the Scottish based ESO Sport Ltd as Head of Sport, which in 2023 moved to Warner Bros - Discovery
