= Saracen Cycles =

Bicycle brand

Saracen Cycles, known simply as "Saracen" is a bicycle brand sold in the United Kingdom, Europe and Asia. Originally based in Warwick, England, the company is best known for its range of mountain bikes.

Started in 1983, Saracen was a market leader during the early 1990s. In 2009, the brand was acquired by Madison, a significant distributor of bicycles, parts and accessories which in turn is part of the H. Young group of companies. Madison, based in Stanmore, Middlesex, also owns the Genesis and Ridgeback cycle brands. The Saracen brand is now operated out of Madison premises in Milton Keynes.

== Madison Saracen Downhill Team ==
Since being acquired by Madison the Saracen brand has undergone significant investment and development, helped in part by the formation of the Madison Saracen Downhill Team. This development-focussed team launched in 2011 and has a number of notable accolades to date including multiple World Cup podiums, a 2011 Junior World Cup winner, 2011 Junior World Champion and a Bronze medal at the 2012 World Championships, thanks to team rider Manon Carpenter.

Since the start of the 2012 season the Madison Saracen team has been managed by former Mountain Biking UK rider and manager, Will Longden.

In January 2013 the team announced the addition of Sam Dale to the team, with Manon Carpenter, Harry Molloy and Phil Atwill all staying on the team.

In 2014, Manon Carpenter had the season of her life and won the World Cup overall and the World Championships. The team was split in two. A factory race team would contest the biggest races spearheaded by Carpenter, Dale and new signing Matt Simmonds.

Alongside the factory team a development team was launched.

Following the split the team had its most successful season as Carpenter won the world cup series overall and the world championships.

A second-place from Simmonds at the final world cup of the season was enough to place the team third in the end-of-series standings.

In 2015 the Madison Saracen factory retained the services of Simmonds, Carpenter and Dale.

After a tumultuous start to the season, Carpenter would recover to finish second overall in the world cup and take silver at the world championships.

In December 2015 Madison Saracen announced its new roster and the signing of Marc Beaumont.

But it was junior Matt Walker who would make the biggest impact, with his first world cup win coming in Cairns.

In December 2016 Carpenter departed the team, with Alex Marin joining the line-up and the standalone development team re-launching.

Matt Walker won his second junior world cup, before going on to win the World Championships in Cairns, Australia.

In January 2018, the team announced their new line-up, with Danny Hart joining Alex Marin and Matt Walker. The high-profile signing of two-time World Champion Danny Hart would go onto earn several podium results as well as the team’s first Elite Men’s World Cup win at Snowshoe in 2019.

At the final round of the 2019 season Danny Hart produced one of the rides of the year to win Madison Saracen’s first Men’s Elite World Cup in Snowshoe. That ride would ultimately determine who won the overall World Cup series that year in a race that has gone down in history.

In 2020 Matt Walker became the overall UCI Downhill World Cup Champion. He secured his title by consistently performing well throughout the season, finishing 4th, 3rd, 2nd and 3rd in the four UCI World Cup rounds.

During the 2021 and 2022 season junior rider Jordan Williams won multiple World Cups and became junior World Champion in 2022 in Les Gets.

To follow up on his outstanding World Cup Overall victory Matt Walker would go onto win his first World Cup in Leogang in June 2022 to further establish himself as one of the fastest mountain bikers on the planet. Now, the Madison Saracen Factory Race Team is made up of Matt Walker and Greg Williamson who race in the Elite Men’s category as well as George Madley who competes in the Junior Men’s category. The team are working hard to get some more top results in 2024 with the all British line-up of Matt Walker, Greg Williamson and George Madley. The Madison Saracen Development Team is also managed by former racer Matt Simmonds and is made up of two young rider, Olivia Taylor and Felix Griffiths.

== Downhill Team Roster ==
2024

Factory Racing Team

Rider	Date of birth
Matt Walker (GBR)	25 May 1999 (age 25)
George Madley (GBR)	
Greg Williamson (GBR)	

2021

Factory Racing Team

Rider	Date of birth
Matt Walker (GBR)	25 May 1999 (age 25)
Veronica Widmann (ITA)	8 March 1993 (age 31)
Harry Molloy (GBR)	5 March 1991 (age 33)
Jordan Williams (GBR)	21 July 2004 (age 19)

2018

Factory Racing Team

Rider	Date of birth
Danny Hart (GBR)	20 September 1991 (age 32)
Alex Marin Trillo (ESP)	25 March 1997 (age 27)
Matt Walker (GBR)	25 May 1999 (age 25)

2017

Factory Racing Team

Rider	Date of birth
`Marc Beaumont (GBR)	2 December 1990 (age 33)
Alex Marin Trillo (ESP)	25 March 1997 (age 27)
Matt Simmonds (GBR)	20 May 1987 (age 37)
Matt Walker (GBR)	25 May 1999 (age 25)

2016

Factory Racing Team

Rider	Date of birth
`Marc Beaumont (GBR)	2 December 1990 (age 33)
Manon Carpenter (GBR)	11 March 1993 (age 31)
Matt Simmonds (GBR)	20 May 1987 (age 37)
Matt Walker (GBR)	25 May 1999 (age 25)

2015

Factory Racing Team

Rider	Date of birth
Sam Dale (GBR)	2 December 1990 (age 33)
Manon Carpenter (GBR)	11 March 1993 (age 31)
Matt Simmonds (GBR)	20 May 1987 (age 37)

Development Team

Rider	Date of birth
Jack Geoghegan (GBR)	23 June 1990 (age 34)
Jack Tennyson (GBR)	5 March 1999 (age 25)
Matt Walker (GBR)	25 May 1999 (age 25)

2014

Factory Racing Team

Rider	Date of birth
Sam Dale (GBR)	2 December 1990 (age 33)
Manon Carpenter (GBR)	11 March 1993 (age 31)
Matt Simmonds (GBR)	20 May 1987 (age 37)

2013

Rider	Date of birth
Sam Dale (GBR)	3 November 1993 (age 31)
Manon Carpenter (GBR)	11 March 1993 (age 32)
Harry Molloy (GBR)	30 May 1991 (age 33)
Phil Atwill (GBR)	11 January 1995 (age 30)

2011-2012

Rider	Date of birth
Manon Carpenter (GBR)	11 March 1993 (age 32)
Harry Molloy (GBR)	30 May 1991 (age 33)
Phil Atwill (GBR)	11 January 1995 (age 30)
Josh Lowe (GBR)	16 November 1994 (age 30)
Jack Geoghegan (GBR)	23 June 1990 (age 34)
William Weston (GBR)	6 September 1997 (age 27)

The team rides on the Saracen Myst downhill bike.

== Team riders ==
In its early days Saracen was the home of two of the best known UK Downhill Mountain Bikers, Matt Davis and Rob Warner.

Saracen was famous for sponsoring the MAD Trials display team, up until 2006 when it was sold. Owned by Giles Wolfe, the MAD team made appearances on TV programmes Blue Peter, You Bet and Britains got Talent. The MAD Team continued with further sponsorship until it was sold in 2017.

UK Dirt Jumper Lance McDermott signed for Saracen in 2010 on a 3 year deal. Blake Samson joined Lance McDermott on the dirt jump team in 2012. Blake is a regular fixture on the Animal Bike Tour with fellow Animal rider, Martyn Ashton.

== See also ==
- List of bicycle manufacturing companies
