= Madison Saracen =

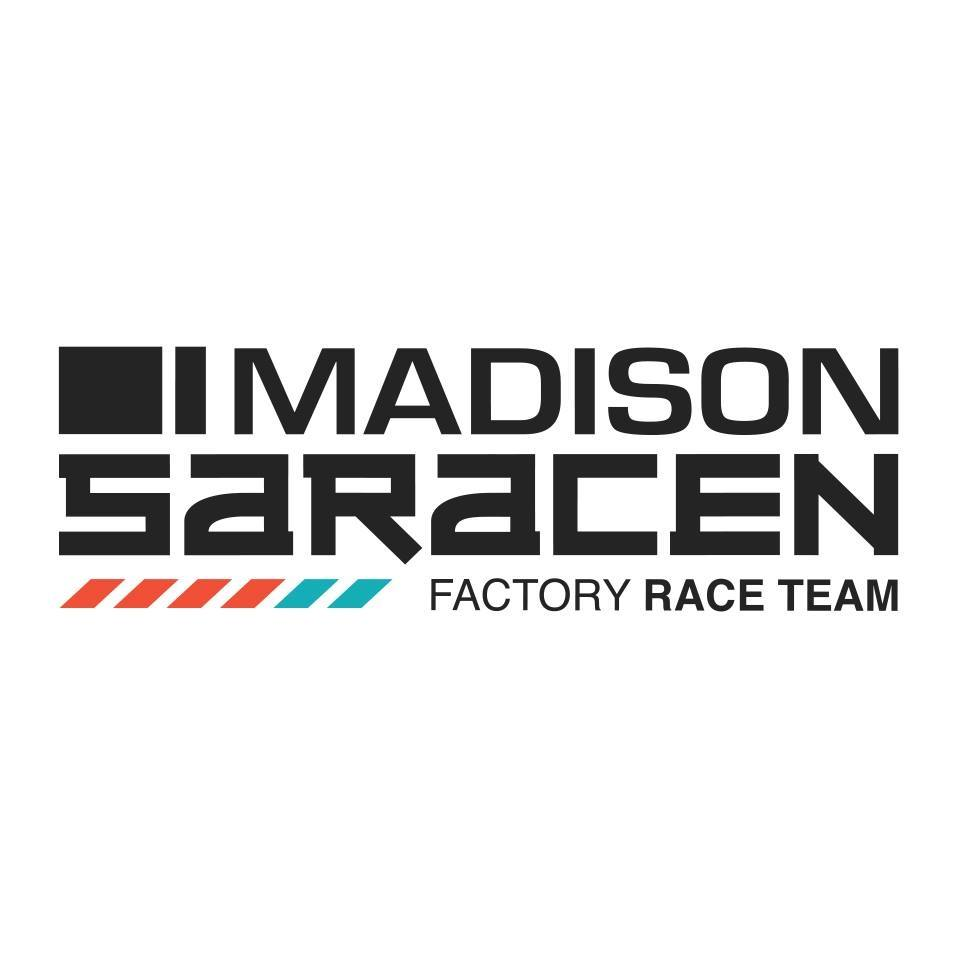

Team information
- UCI code: MAD
- Registered: United Kingdom
- Founded: 2011
- Discipline: MTB
- Status: UCI mountain bike team
- Bicycles: Saracen

Key personnel
- General manager: Will Longden

Team name history
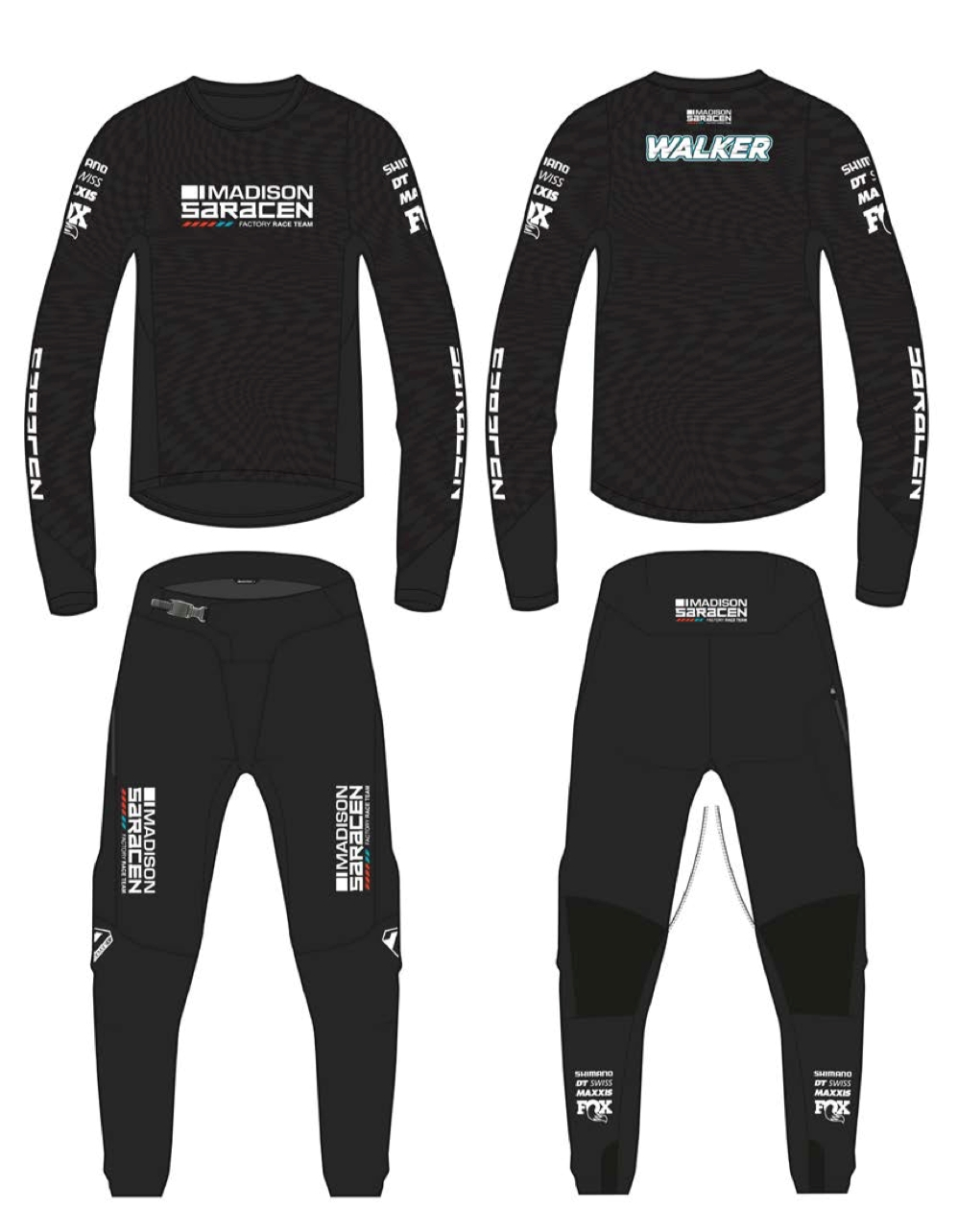
Madison Saracen jersey
Jersey

Madison Saracen is a British-based UCI trade team, specialising in downhill mountain biking.

In 2018 the team announced the signing of two-time world champion Danny Hart.

Founded in 2011, the team achieved great success with Manon Carpenter and later Matt Walker.

Carpenter became junior UCI Mountain Bike Downhill World Champion in the team’s debut season, before going on to take the senior titles of the UCI Mountain Bike Downhill World Cup and World Championships in 2014.

Walker became junior UCI Mountain Bike Downhill World Champion in 2017.

In 2018, the team made the high-profile signing of two-time World Champion Danny Hart, who would go on to earn several podium results as well as the team’s first Elite Men’s World Cup win at Snowshoe in 2019.

Now, the Madison Saracen Factory Race Team is made up of Matt Walker and Greg Williamson who race in the Elite Men’s category as well as George Madley who competes in the Junior Men’s category.

The Madison Saracen Development Team is also managed by former racer Matt Simmonds and is made up of two young riders, Olivia Taylor and Felix Griffiths.

== History ==
=== Formation ===
Launched in 2011, the team’s aspiration was clearly laid out by Madison CEO Dominic Langan when he spoke to the press saying, “The first year is mainly a development squad, with a couple of people riding the world cup series. It’s a minimum three-year program and hopefully we’ll be doing much more beyond that – the aim is to get more riders into the world cup series. We hope to build that up and hopefully we can get some champions. We just want to get good British riders out there.”

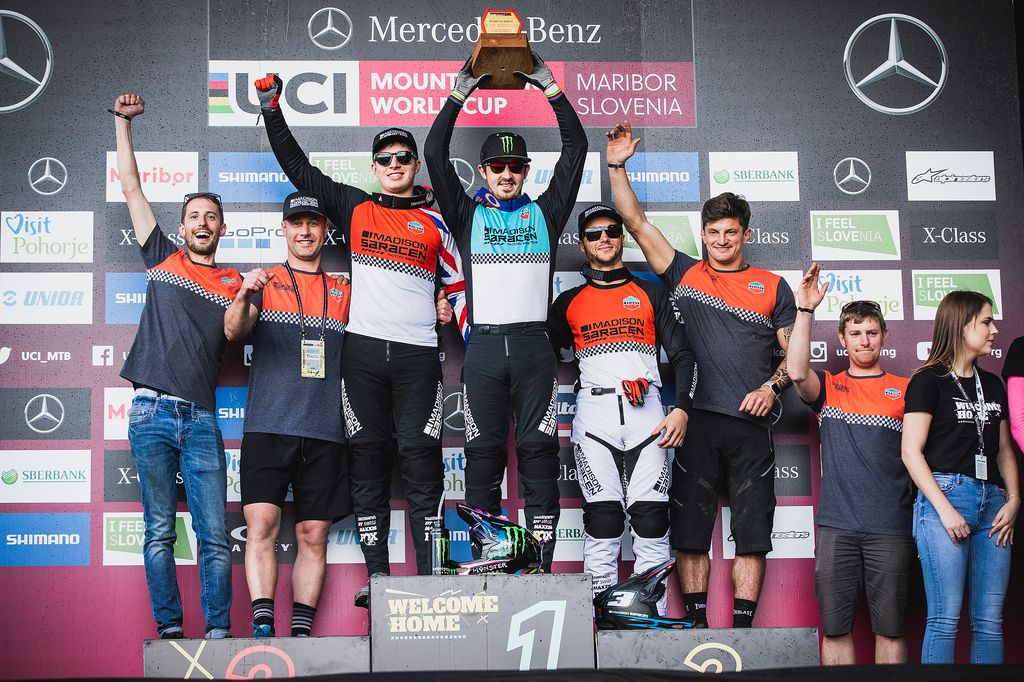
Team Win in Maribor 2019

=== Team progression ===
Manon Carpenter took the team’s first major win at the junior world championships in Champery, Switzerland.

The win was followed by the appointment of Tim Flooks as team manager in November 2011, but he was forced to stand down soon after due to health problems.

In February 2012, Will Longden took the position of team manager.

Longden – himself a four-time British champion in downhill, fourcross and dual slalom – took the reins of the team following a period of time coaching the MBUK development squad. He was also British Cycling’s rider representative for downhill mountain biking.

In 2012 Manon Carpenter took the team’s first world cup and world championship podium results.

Longden strengthened the team in 2013 signing Sam Dale, as Carpenter visited the world cup podium in five out of six rounds.

By 2014 the team was split in two. A factory race team would contest the biggest races spearheaded by Carpenter, Dale and new signing Matt Simmonds.

Alongside the factory team a development team was launched.

Following the split the team had its most successful season as Carpenter won the world cup series overall and the world championships.

A second-place from Simmonds at the final world cup of the season was enough to place the team third in the end-of-series standings.

In 2015 the Madison Saracen factory retained the services of Simmonds, Carpenter and Dale.

After a tumultuous start to the season, Carpenter would recover to finish second overall in the world cup and take silver at the world championships.

In December 2015 Madison Saracen announced its new roster and the signing of Marc Beaumont.

But it was junior Matt Walker who would make the biggest impact, with his first world cup win coming in Cairns.

In December 2016 Carpenter departed the team, with Alex Marin joining the line-up and the standalone development team re-launching.

Matt Walker won his second junior world cup, before going on to win the World Championships in Cairns, Australia.

In January 2018, the team announced their new line-up, with Danny Hart joining Alex Marin and Matt Walker. The high-profile signing of two-time World Champion Danny Hart would go onto earn several podium results as well as the team’s first Elite Men’s World Cup win at Snowshoe in 2019.

At the final round of the 2019 season Danny Hart produced one of the rides of the year to win Madison Saracen’s first Men’s Elite World Cup in Snowshoe. That ride would ultimately determine who won the overall World Cup series that year in a race that has gone down in history.

In 2020 Matt Walker became the overall UCI Downhill World Cup Champion. He secured his title by consistently performing well throughout the season, finishing 4th, 3rd, 2nd and 3rd in the four UCI World Cup rounds.

During the 2021 and 2022 season junior rider Jordan Williams won multiple World Cups and became junior World Champion in 2022 in Les Gets.

To follow up on his World Cup Overall victory, Matt Walker would go onto win his first World Cup in Leogang in June 2022 to further establish himself as one of the fastest mountain bikers on the planet.

Now, the Madison Saracen Factory Race Team is made up of Matt Walker and Greg Williamson who race in the Elite Men’s category as well as George Madley who competes in the Junior Men’s category. The team are working hard to get some more top results in 2024 with the all British line-up of Matt Walker, Greg Williamson and George Madley. The Madison Saracen Development Team is also managed by former racer Matt Simmonds and is made up of two young rider, Olivia Taylor and Felix Griffiths.

== Team roster ==
2024

Factory Racing Team

Rider	Date of birth
Matt Walker (GBR)	25 May 1999 (age 27)
George Madley (GBR)
Greg Williamson (GBR)

2021

Factory Racing Team

Rider	Date of birth
Matt Walker (GBR)	25 May 1999 (age 27)
Veronica Widmann (ITA)	8 March 1993 (age 33)
Harry Molloy (GBR)	5 March 1991 (age 35)
Jordan Williams (GBR)	21 July 2004 (age 22)

2018

Factory Racing Team

Rider	Date of birth
Danny Hart (GBR)	20 September 1991 (age 35)
Alex Marin Trillo (ESP)	25 March 1997 (age 29)
Matt Walker (GBR)	25 May 1999 (age 27)

2017

Factory Racing Team

Rider	Date of birth
`Marc Beaumont (GBR)	2 December 1990 (age 35)
Alex Marin Trillo (ESP)	25 March 1997 (age 29)
Matt Simmonds (GBR)	20 May 1987 (age 39)
Matt Walker (GBR)	25 May 1999 (age 27)

2016

Factory Racing Team

Rider	Date of birth
`Marc Beaumont (GBR)	2 December 1990 (age 35)
Manon Carpenter (GBR)	11 March 1993 (age 33)
Matt Simmonds (GBR)	20 May 1987 (age 39)
Matt Walker (GBR)	25 May 1999 (age 27)

2015

Factory Racing Team

Rider	Date of birth
Sam Dale (GBR)	2 December 1990 (age 35)
Manon Carpenter (GBR)	11 March 1993 (age 33)
Matt Simmonds (GBR)	20 May 1987 (age 39)

Development Team

Rider	Date of birth
Jack Geoghegan (GBR)	23 June 1990 (age 36)
Jack Tennyson (GBR)	5 March 1999 (age 27)
Matt Walker (GBR)	25 May 1999 (age 27)

2014

Factory Racing Team

Rider	Date of birth
Sam Dale (GBR)	2 December 1990 (age 35)
Manon Carpenter (GBR)	11 March 1993 (age 33)
Matt Simmonds (GBR)	20 May 1987 (age 39)

2013

Rider	Date of birth
Sam Dale (GBR)	2 December 1990 (age 35)
Manon Carpenter (GBR)	11 March 1993 (age 33)
Harry Molloy (GBR)	30 May 1991 (age 35)
Phil Atwill (GBR)	11 January 1995 (age 31)

2012

Rider	Date of birth
Manon Carpenter (GBR)	11 March 1993 (age 33)
Harry Molloy (GBR)	30 May 1991 (age 35)
Phil Atwill (GBR)	11 January 1995 (age 31)
Josh Lowe (GBR)	16 November 1994 (age 31)
Jack Geoghegan (GBR)	23 June 1990 (age 36)
William Weston (GBR)	6 September 1997 (age 29)

2011

Rider	Date of birth
Manon Carpenter (GBR)	11 March 1993 (age 33)
Harry Molloy (GBR)	30 May 1991 (age 35)
Phil Atwill (GBR)	11 January 1995 (age 31)
Josh Lowe (GBR)	16 November 1994 (age 31)
Jack Geoghegan (GBR)	23 June 1990 (age 36)
William Weston (GBR)	6 September 1997 (age 29)

== Title sponsors ==
Madison Clothing

Saracen bikes

== Results ==
- UK Downhill National Championships, Rhyd-y-Felin – 1st Place, Matt Walker

=== 2022 ===
- Junior Men’s World Cup Round One, Lourdes – 3rd Place, Jordan Williams
- World Cup Round Two, Fort William – 5th Place, Matt Walker
- Junior Men’s World Cup Round Two, Fort William – 1st Place, Jordan Williams
- Junior Men’s World Cup Round Three, Leogang – 1st Place, Jordan Williams
- Junior Men’s World Cup Round Four, Lenzerheide – 3rd Place, Jordan Williams
- Junior Men’s World Cup Round Five, Pal Arinsal – 2nd Place, Jordan Williams
- Junior Men’s World Cup Round Seven, Mont-Sainte-Anne – 2nd Place, Jordan Williams
- Junior Men’s Downhill World Championships, Les Gets – 1st Place, Jordan Williams
- Junior Men’s World Cup Round Eight, Val di Sole – 1st Place, Jordan Williams
- Italian Women’s National Championships – 1st Place, Veronika Widmann
- World Cup Round Three, Leogang – 1st Place, Matt Walker

=== 2021 ===
- Junior Men’s World Cup Round One, Leogang – 4th Place, Jordan Williams
- Junior Men’s World Cup Round Two, Les Gets – 2nd Place, Jordan Williams
- Junior Men’s World Cup Round Three, Maribor – 2nd Place, Jordan Williams
- Junior Men’s Downhill World Championships, Val di Sole – 2nd Place, Jordan Williams
- Junior Men’s World Cup Round Four, Lenzerheide – 4th Place, Jordan Williams
- Junior Men’s World Cup Round Five, Snowshoe – 1st Place, Jordan Williams
- Junior Men’s World Cup Round Six, Snowshoe – 1st Place, Jordan Williams
- Italian Women’s National Championships – 1st Place, Veronika Widmann
- UK Downhill National Championships, Rhyd-y-Felin – 1st Place, Matt Walker

=== 2020 ===
- World Cup Round One, Maribor – 4th Place, Matt Walker
- World Cup Round Two, Maribor – 3rd Place, Matt Walker
- World Cup Round Three, Lousã – 2nd Place, Matt Walker
- World Cup Round Four, Lousã – 3rd Place, Matt Walker
- Men’s World Cup Overall Series Champion 2020 – Matt Walker

=== 2019 ===
- World Cup Round One, Maribor – 1st Place, Danny Hart
- World Cup Round One, Maribor – 5th Place, Matt Walker
- World Cup Round Two, Fort William – 5th Place, Danny Hart
- World Cup Round Three, Leogang – 4th Place, Danny Hart
- World Cup Round Four, Vallnord – 5th Place, Danny Hart
- Men’s UK National Championships, Revolution Bike Park – 1st Place, Danny Hart
- World Cup Round Six, Val di Sole – 5th Place, Danny Hart
- World Cup Round Seven, Lenzerheide – 5th Place, Danny Hart
- UCI Downhill World Championships, Mont-Sainte-Anne – 4th Place, Danny Hart
- World Cup Round Eight, Snowshoe – 1st Place, Danny Hart
- Men’s Spanish National Championships – 1st Place, Alex Marin

=== 2018 ===
- Men’s UK National Championships, Glencoe – 1st Place, Matt Walker
- Men’s National Championships, Glencoe – 2nd Place, Danny Hart
- Men’s Spanish National Championships – 1st Place, Alex Marin
- World Cup Round Four, Val di Sole – 3rd Place, Danny Hart
- UCI Downhill World Championships – 3rd Place, Danny Hart

=== 2017 ===
- Junior World Cup Round Two, Fort William – 1st Place, Matt Walker
- Junior World Cup Round Three, Leogang – 2nd Place, Matt Walker
- Junior World Cup Round Four, Vallnord – 2nd Place, Matt Walker
- Junior UK Men’s National Championships, Rhyd-y-Felin – 1st Place, Matt Walker
- Junior Men’s Downhill World Championships, Cairns, Australia – 1st Place, Matt Walker

2016

UCI Mountain Bike World Cup Downhill

Round 5 Lenzerheide, Switzerland - 4th Manon Carpenter senior women
Round 4 Leogang, Austria - 5th Manon Carpenter senior women
Round 3 Fort William, Great Britain - 3rd Manon Carpenter senior women
Round 2 Cairns, Australia - 1st Matt Walker, junior men; 3rd Manon Carpenter senior women
Round 1 Lourdes, France - 2nd Matt Walker, junior men; 3rd Manon Carpenter senior women

2015
2nd DH, UCI Mountain Bike World Cup Overall - Manon Carpenter
2nd DH, UCI Mountain Bike World Championships, Vallnord, Andorra - Manon Carpenter
3rd DH, UCI Mountain Bike World Cup Team Standing Overall - Madison Saracen

UCI Mountain Bike World Cup Downhill

3rd Round 2 Fort William, Great Britain senior women - Manon Carpenter
2nd Round 4 Lenzerheide, Switzerland senior women - Manon Carpenter
2nd Round 5 Mont Sainte Anne, Canada senior women - Manon Carpenter
2nd Round 6 Windham, USA senior women - Manon Carpenter
3rd Round 7 Val di Sole, Italy senior women - Manon Carpenter

2014
1st DH, UCI Mountain Bike World Cup - Manon Carpenter
1st DH, UCI Mountain Bike World Championships, Hafjell, Norway - Manon Carpenter
2nd DH, UCI Mountain Bike World Cup Team Standing Overall - Madison Saracen

UCI Mountain Bike World Cup Downhill

1st Round 1 Pietermaritzburg, South Africa, senior women - Manon Carpenter
2nd Round 2 Cairns, Australia, senior women - Manon Carpenter
1st Round 4 Leogang, Austria, senior women - Manon Carpenter
1st Round 5 Mont Sainte Anne, Canada, senior women - Manon Carpenter
2nd Round 7 Meribel, France, senior women - Manon Carpenter, SILVER Matt Simmonds

2013
3rd DH, UCI Mountain Bike World Cup - Manon Carpenter

UCI Mountain Bike World Cup Downhill

2nd Round 1 Fort William, Great Britain, senior women - Manon Carpenter
2nd Round 2 Val di Sole, Italy, junior men - Phil Atwill
2nd Round 3 La Massana, Andorra, senior women - Manon Carpenter
2nd Round 4 Mont Sainte Anne, Canada, senior women - Manon Carpenter
2nd Round 5 Hafjell, Norway, senior women - Manon Carpenter
3rd Round 6 Leogang, Austria, senior women - Manon Carpenter

2nd (United Kingdom) DH, British National Mountain Biking Championships, senior women - Manon Carpenter

2012
3rd DH, UCI Mountain Bike & Trials World Championships Elite, Leogang, Austria - Manon Carpenter

UCI Mountain Bike World Cup Downhill

Round 1 Pietermaritzburg, South Africa, senior women - Manon Carpenter

2nd (United Kingdom) DH, British National Mountain Biking Championships, senior women - Manon Carpenter
3rd (United Kingdom) DH, British National Mountain Biking Championships, youth men - Will Weston

2011
1st DH, UCI Mountain Bike & Trials World Championships, junior women, - Manon Carpenter
1st DH, UCI Mountain Bike World Cup, Series Overall, junior women - Manon Carpenter

1st (United Kingdom) DH, British National Mountain Biking Championships, junior women - Manon Carpenter
1st (United Kingdom) DH, British National Mountain Biking Championships, youth men - Phillip Atwill
