= Trey Mancini =

American baseball player (born 1992)

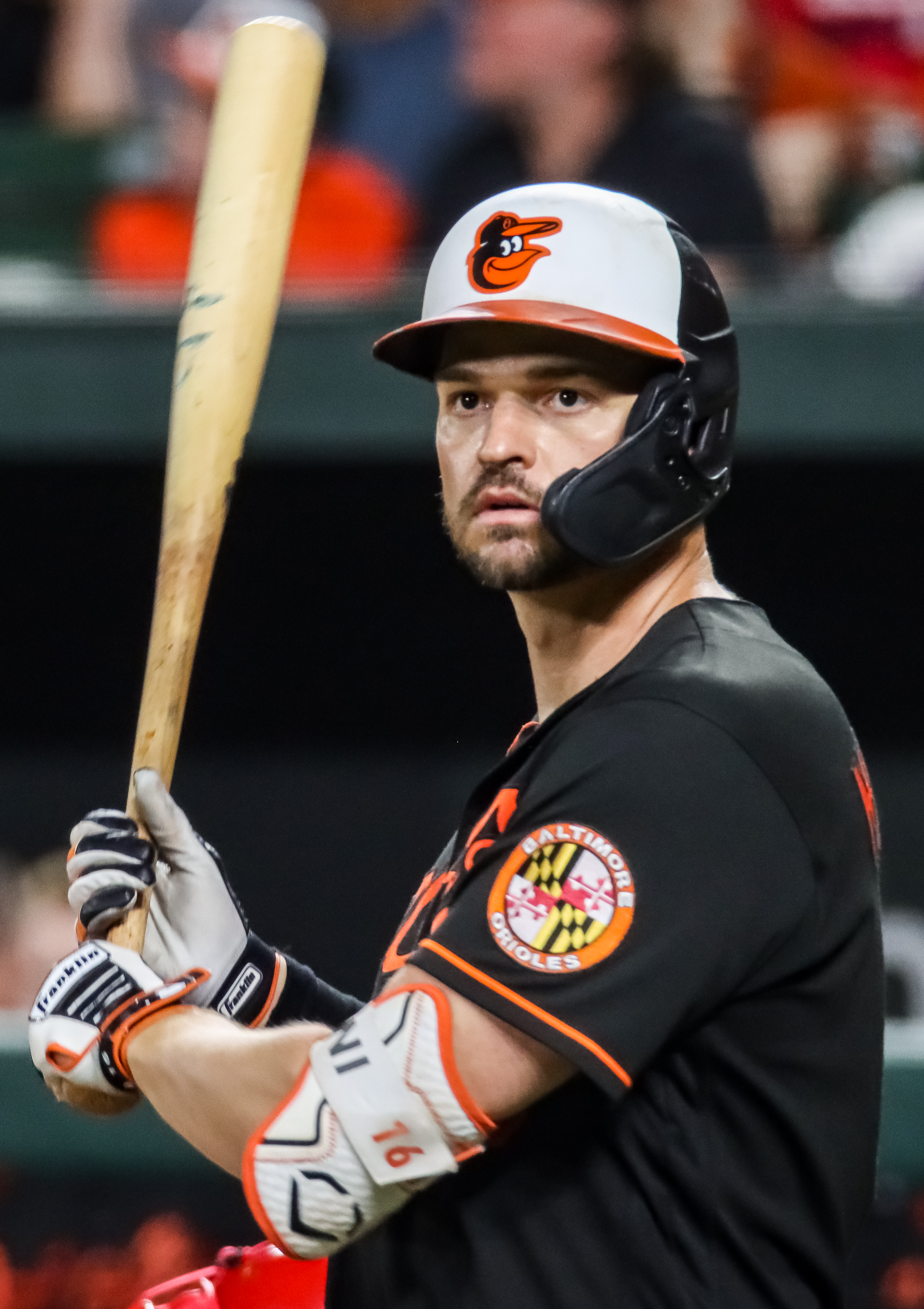
- Mancini with the Baltimore Orioles in 2022
- First baseman / Outfielder / Designated hitter
- Born: March 18, 1992 (age 34); Winter Haven, Florida, U.S.
- Batted: Right Threw: Right

MLB debut
- September 20, 2016, for the Baltimore Orioles

Last MLB appearance
- June 14, 2026, for the Los Angeles Angels

MLB statistics
- Batting average: .263
- Home runs: 129
- Runs batted in: 404
- Stats at Baseball Reference

Teams
- Baltimore Orioles (2016–2019, 2021–2022); Houston Astros (2022); Chicago Cubs (2023); Los Angeles Angels (2026)

Career highlights and awards
- World Series champion (2022); AL Comeback Player of the Year (2021)

Joseph Anthony "Trey" Mancini III (born March 18, 1992) is an American former professional baseball first baseman, outfielder, and designated hitter. He played in Major League Baseball (MLB) for the Baltimore Orioles, Houston Astros, Chicago Cubs, and Los Angeles Angels from 2016 to 2026. His nickname "Boomer", originally "Boom Boom" after Ray Mancini, morphed into its current form when he enrolled at the University of Notre Dame. The Orioles selected Mancini in the eighth round of the 2013 MLB draft. He made his MLB debut in 2016 with the Orioles.

Mancini was diagnosed with colon cancer in early 2020, consequently missing the entire shortened season. Upon his recovery, Mancini returned to baseball in 2021 and was subsequently awarded the AL Comeback Player of the Year. In 2022, he was traded mid-season to the Astros, with whom he won the 2022 World Series.

== Amateur career ==
Mancini attended Winter Haven High School in Winter Haven, Florida, where he batted .480 with six home runs as a senior. After high school, he attended the University of Notre Dame, where he played college baseball for the Notre Dame Fighting Irish and pursued a degree in political science. He played collegiate summer baseball for the Holyoke Blue Sox of the New England Collegiate Baseball League in 2011, and the Harwich Mariners of the Cape Cod Baseball League in 2012. In 2013, his junior year at Notre Dame, he slashed .389/.431/.603 with seven home runs and 54 runs batted in (RBI) in 57 games.

== Professional career ==
=== Baltimore Orioles ===
==== Minor leagues ====
The Baltimore Orioles drafted Mancini in the eighth round, with the 249th overall selection, of the 2013 Major League Baseball draft. He signed, and made his professional debut with the Aberdeen IronBirds of the Low-A New York–Penn League that same year. Mancini spent the whole season with Aberdeen, batting .328 with three home runs and 35 RBI in 68 games. He began the 2014 season with the Delmarva Shorebirds of the Single-A South Atlantic League and received a midseason promotion to the Frederick Keys of the High-A Carolina League. In 137 games between the two teams, Mancini compiled a .284 batting average with ten home runs and 83 RBI. He began the 2015 season with Frederick, and was promoted during the season to the Bowie Baysox of the Double-A Eastern League. In 136 games, Mancini slashed .341/.375/.563 with 21 home runs, 89 RBI, and 43 doubles.

After spending some time in Baltimore during spring training, Mancini returned to Bowie to start the 2016 season. He was blocked at Triple-A by Joey Terdoslavich, but was nonetheless promoted to the Norfolk Tides in April as Terdoslavich struggled. He spent the remainder of the season at Norfolk, batting .280 with 13 home runs and 54 RBI in 125 games.

==== Major leagues ====
The Orioles promoted Mancini to the major leagues for the first time on September 18, 2016, during September call-ups. On September 20, in his major league debut as the designated hitter against the Boston Red Sox, he hit a home run against Eduardo Rodríguez in his second at-bat. His parents were in attendance to watch this, his first MLB home run. That home run made Mancini the fourth Orioles' player to hit a home run for their first Major League hit after Larry Haney (1966), Nick Markakis (2006) and Jonathan Schoop (2013). Mancini started again two nights later and hit his second career home run, a three-run homer off David Price. He became the 20th player in major league history to hit a home run in his first two starts. Mancini also became the third player in major league history to homer in their first three starts, after he hit a solo home run against the Arizona Diamondbacks on September 24.

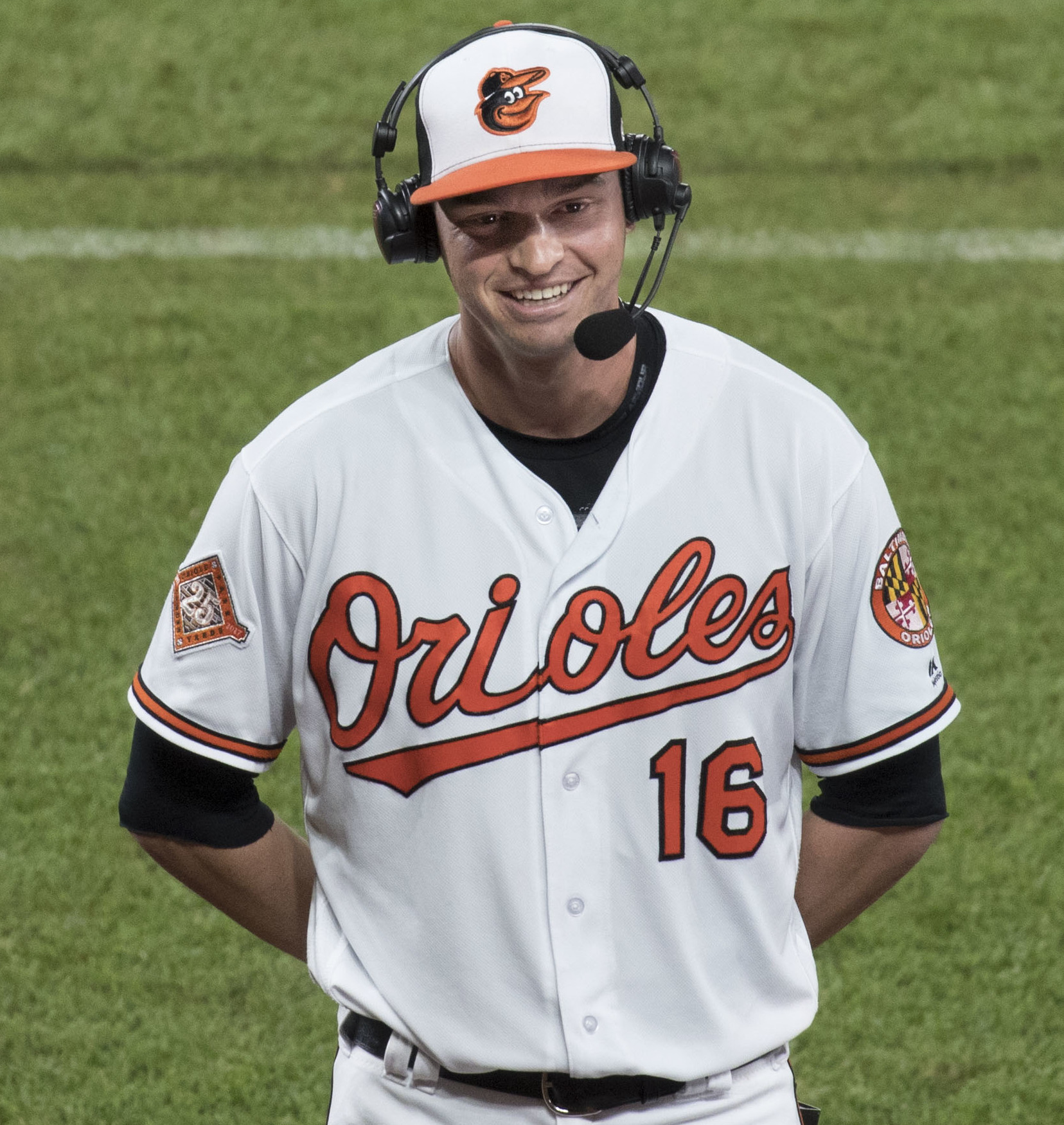
Mancini with the Orioles in 2017

Mancini made the Orioles' 2017 Opening Day roster after transitioning to the outfield. On April 16, 2017, Mancini recorded his second multi-home run game of the season, while driving in four runs. He tied Trevor Story and Dino Restelli for most home runs through a player's first 12 career games with seven. On April 22, Mancini hit his fifth home run of the season and eighth of his career. He tied Story and Carlos Delgado for most home runs through a player's first 17 career games. On June 7, in a game against the Pittsburgh Pirates, Mancini hit a game-tying, pinch-hit two-run home run in the ninth inning off closer Tony Watson. Two innings later, with two on and two outs, Mancini hit a walk-off three-run home run off Wade LeBlanc to give the Orioles a 9–6 victory. Per STATS, LLC, Mancini became the first Oriole to hit a pinch-hit homer in the 9th inning or later and then hit another home run in the same game. He also became the second Oriole ever to hit a game-tying home run in the 9th inning or later and then hit a walk-off homer in the same game (Mike Young on May 28, 1987). He also joined Boog Powell ('66) and Eddie Murray ('80) as the only three Orioles to homer in the 9th inning and in extras in the same game. Mancini finished the season batting .293/.338/.488 with a .826 OPS, 120 OPS+, 24 home runs and 78 RBI in 147 games during his rookie campaign. He also collected 159 hits on his way to finishing in third place for American League Rookie of the Year voting.

Mancini batted leadoff for 51 of 156 games played in 2018. He ended the season hitting .242 with 24 home runs and 58 RBIs. Mancini was leading the Orioles in most offensive categories in late-April. He is one of three MLB players along with Alex Bregman and Anthony Rendon with at least 35 doubles, 34 home runs and 100 runs in 2019. He set a career high with five hits in an 11–4 win over the Toronto Blue Jays at Rogers Centre on September 24, 2019. He ended the season hitting .291 with 35 home runs and 97 RBIs. Mancini was awarded the 2019 Louis M. Hatter Most Valuable Oriole Award by members of the local media.

On March 7, 2020, Mancini left the Orioles during spring training to undergo a non-baseball medical procedure. On March 12, it was revealed that the procedure was the removal of a malignant tumor from his colon. On April 28, Mancini revealed he had stage 3 colon cancer and began chemotherapy to treat his cancer. On June 28, Mancini was placed on the 60-day injured list and missed the entire 2020 season due to recovery from Stage 3 colon cancer surgery. He completed chemotherapy in November 2020.

In November 2020, Mancini announced that he was cancer-free and planned to play for the Orioles in 2021. He returned to the Orioles at the beginning of spring training and appeared in the team's first game of the preseason, against the Pittsburgh Pirates. Mancini was given a standing ovation by the Orioles crowd prior to his first at-bat of the season in Baltimore. He finished the 2021 season batting .255/.326/.432 with 21 home runs and 71 RBIs in 147 games. On November 22, 2021, Mancini was awarded the American League Comeback Player of the Year Award.

On July 28, 2022, Mancini hit an inside-the-park home run with a runner on base that started as what appeared to be a routine sacrifice fly. However, the ball deflected off the cheek of Tampa Bay Rays right fielder Josh Lowe after he lost it in the afternoon sun, allowing Mancini to score. It was a very memorable at-bat for Orioles fans for two reasons: 1. Due to the park’s commemoration of Mo Gaba, Baltimore’s number one sports fan who passed on the same day in 2020, and 2. It ended up being Mancini's final at bat as an Oriole at Camden Yards.

=== Houston Astros ===
The Orioles traded Mancini to the Houston Astros in a three-team trade on August 1, 2022, in which the Orioles acquired Seth Johnson from the Tampa Bay Rays and Chayce McDermott from Houston, the Rays acquired Jose Siri from Houston, and the Astros also acquired Jayden Murray from the Rays. Mancini hit a home run for his first hit as an Astro on August 3 to help lead a 6–1 win against the Boston Red Sox. On August 5, Mancini hit his first career grand slam against Hunter Gaddis of the Cleveland Guardians as part of a two-homer, 5 RBI day. He homered on August 18 on the way to a 21–5 win over the Chicago White Sox that included 25 hits, tied for both the second-highest scoring output and most hits in team history. The Astros defeated the Rays 4–0 on September 19 to clinch the AL West division title, which made Mancini a division title winner for the first time in his career.

In 2022 between the two teams, Mancini batted .239/.319/.391 in 519 at-bats, with 18 home runs and 63 RBI. He split time between 71 games at DH, 39 at first base, 20 in left field, and 11 in right field.

In Game 5 of the 2022 World Series, Mancini pinch-hit for and defensively replaced an injured Yuli Gurriel in the 7th inning, his first time playing defense since October 5. He would end up making a game-saving play in the 8th inning, snagging a hard-hit ball by Kyle Schwarber to get the Astros out of a jam and preserve their 3–2 lead. The Astros defeated the Philadelphia Phillies the following game for their fourth win in the best-of-seven series to give Mancini his first career World Series title.

The Astros declined Mancini's option for 2023, thereby making him a free agent.

=== Chicago Cubs ===
On January 20, 2023, Mancini signed a two-year, $14 million contract with the Chicago Cubs. Before the signing, he had agreed to play for the Italy national baseball team in the 2023 World Baseball Classic. However, after signing, he withdrew from the WBC. Mancini batted .234 with 4 home runs and 28 RBI in 79 games for the Cubs before he was designated for assignment on August 1. He was officially released by the Cubs the next day.

=== Cincinnati Reds ===
On August 23, 2023, Mancini signed a minor league contract with the Cincinnati Reds organization. Mancini hit .316 with two home runs in five games with the Triple–A Louisville Bats before he was released on August 30.

=== Miami Marlins ===
On January 24, 2024, Mancini signed a minor league contract with the Miami Marlins organization. On March 23, he opted out of his contract and became a free agent.

=== Arizona Diamondbacks ===
On February 7, 2025, Mancini signed a minor league contract with the Arizona Diamondbacks. In 74 appearances for the Triple-A Reno Aces, he batted .308/.373/.522 with 16 home runs, 62 RBI, and two stolen bases. Mancini triggered the opt-out clause in his contract and was released by the Diamondbacks on July 1.

=== Los Angeles Angels ===
On January 26, 2026, Mancini signed a minor league contract with the Los Angeles Angels. He began the 2026 season with the Triple-A Salt Lake Bees, hitting .273/.377/.464 with six home runs, 29 RBI, and three stolen bases. The Angels promoted Mancini to the major leagues on June 8. In five appearances for Los Angeles, he went 4-for-13 (.308) with four RBI and one triple. Mancini was designated for assignment by the Angels on June 17. He cleared waivers and was sent outright to Triple-A Salt Lake on June 21. However, Mancini rejected the assignment and elected free agency the following day.

On August 18, 2026, Mancini announced his retirement from professional baseball. On September 19, Mancini signed a one-day contract to retire as a member of the Baltimore Orioles.

== Personal life ==
Mancini is of Italian and Irish descent. Mancini's great-grandfather, Antonio Mancini, founded Mancini Foods, a cannery that distributes peppers, onions and hot sauce, in 1922 in New Britain, Connecticut. Mancini's uncle, Rick Mancini, now runs the Florida-based company.

Mancini first met Sara Perlman in 2017, when she worked for MASN, covering the Baltimore Orioles and Washington Nationals. The couple began dating after Perlman left MASN for NBC Sports, as host of The Daily Line. The couple became engaged in November 2021, and married in December 2022.
