= Nolan Hoffman (baseball) =

American baseball player (born 1997)

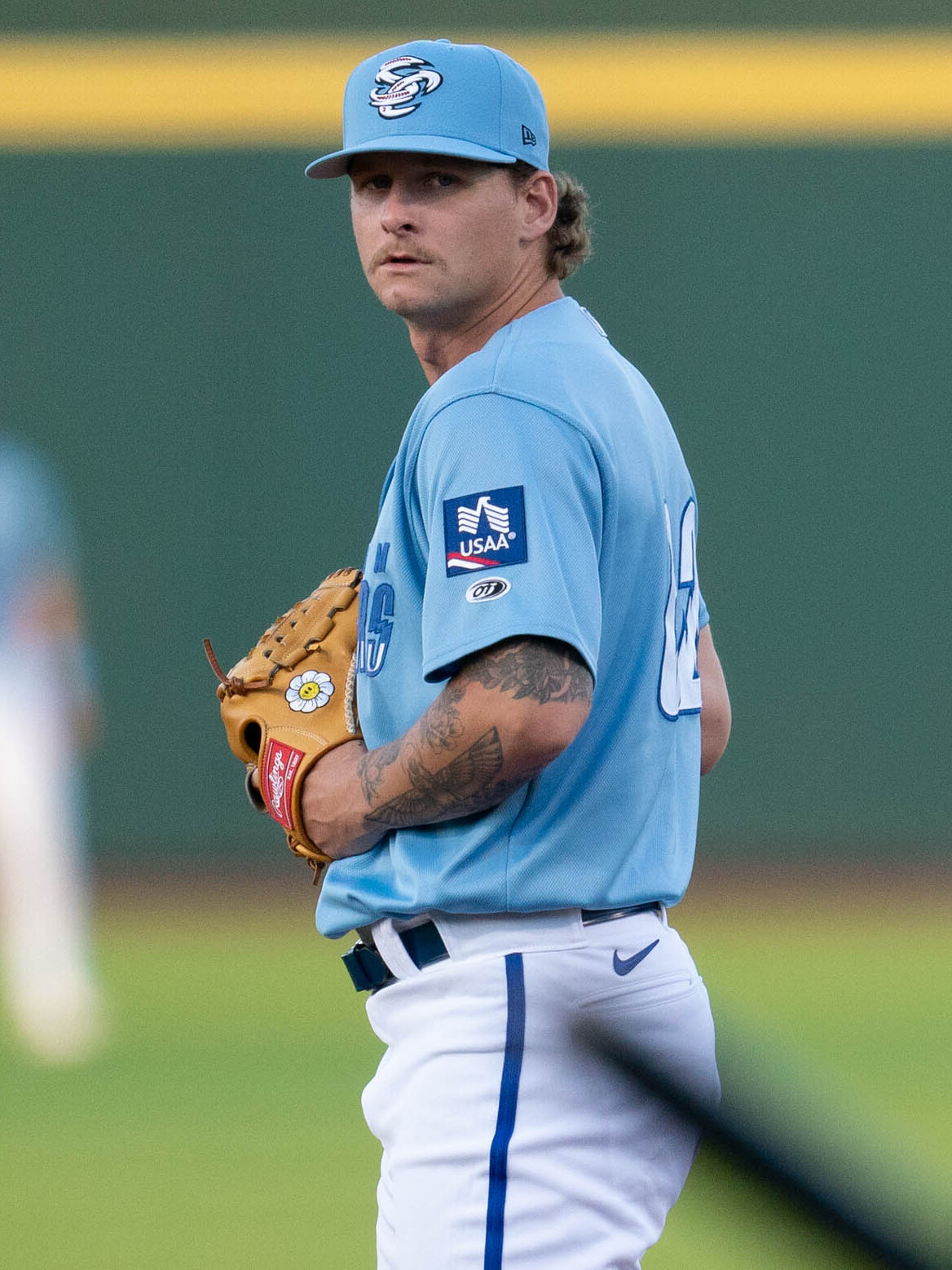
- Hoffman with the Omaha Storm Chasers in 2026

Kansas City Royals – No. 35
- Pitcher
- Born: August 9, 1997 (age 29); Lincoln, Nebraska, U.S.
- Bats: Right Throws: Right

MLB debut
- August 18, 2025, for the Philadelphia Phillies

MLB statistics (through 2026 season)
- Win–loss record: 0–0
- Earned run average: 5.06
- Strikeouts: 14
- Stats at Baseball Reference

Teams
- Philadelphia Phillies (2025–2026); Kansas City Royals (2026–present)

Nolan Rivers Hoffman (born August 9, 1997) is an American professional baseball pitcher for the Kansas City Royals of Major League Baseball (MLB). He made his MLB debut in 2025 for the Philadelphia Phillies.

== Career ==
=== Seattle Mariners ===
Hoffman graduated from Lincoln Southeast High School in Lincoln, Nebraska. He attended Hutchinson Community College in 2016 and 2017 before transferring to Texas A&M University for 2018. The Seattle Mariners selected Hoffman in the fifth round (148th overall) of the 2018 Major League Baseball draft. He split his first professional season between the rookie-level Arizona League Mariners and Low-A Everett AquaSox.

Hoffman spent the 2019 season with the Single-A West Virginia Power, posting an 0–1 record and 1.08 ERA with seven strikeouts and four saves in 8 1/3 innings pitched across nine relief appearances. He did not play in a game in 2020 due to the cancellation of the minor league season because of the COVID-19 pandemic.

Hoffman returned to action in 2021 with Everett and the Single-A Modesto Nuts. In 37 appearances (two starts) for the two affiliates, he posted a combined 1–2 record and 3.53 ERA with 55 strikeouts and six saves over 51 innings of work.

=== Baltimore Orioles ===
On December 8, 2021, the Baltimore Orioles selected Hoffman from the Mariners in the minor league phase of the Rule 5 draft. He split the 2022 season between the rookie-level Florida Complex League Orioles, High-A Aberdeen IronBirds, and Double-A Bowie Baysox. In 20 appearances for the three affiliates, Hoffman logged a cumulative 2–2 record and 3.62 ERA with 25 strikeouts across 27 1/3 innings pitched.

On May 19, 2023, while with Double-A Bowie, Hoffman was part of a combined no-hitter that was thrown against the Altoona Curve. Chayce McDermott was the starting pitcher for Bowie, with Hoffman and Easton Lucas pitching in relief to seal the no-hit bid. He made 32 total appearances split between Bowie and the Triple-A Norfolk Tides, accumulating a 1–2 record and 3.05 ERA with 34 strikeouts and seven saves across 44 1/3 innings pitched.

On May 3, 2024, Hoffman combined with McDermott and Kaleb Ort to toss another combined no-hitter in a 2–0 away win over the Nashville Sounds as members of Triple-A Norfolk. He made 44 total appearances for the Tides (all in relief), registering an 8–3 record and 3.88 ERA with 77 strikeouts and two saves over 58 innings of work. Hoffman elected free agency following the season on November 4.

=== Texas Rangers ===
On December 19, 2024, Hoffman signed a minor league contract with the Texas Rangers organization. In 22 appearances (three starts) for the Triple-A Round Rock Express, Hoffman compiled a 2–0 record and 5.91 ERA with 46 strikeouts over 35 innings of work.

=== Philadelphia Phillies ===
On June 18, 2025, Hoffman was traded to the Philadelphia Phillies in exchange for cash considerations. In 17 appearances for the Triple-A Lehigh Valley IronPigs, he posted a 3–0 record and 3.32 ERA with 27 strikeouts and three saves across 19 innings pitched. On August 18, Hoffman was promoted to the major leagues for the first time; on that day he pitched the top of the ninth inning against the Seattle Mariners, allowing three earned runs and three hits in a Phillies 12–7 victory.

Hoffman was optioned to Triple-A Lehigh Valley to begin the 2026 season. He appeared in three games for Philadelphia, recording a 3.86 ERA with two strikeouts across 4 2/3 innings pitched. On August 3, 2026, Hoffman was designated for assignment by the Phillies.

=== Kansas City Royals ===
On August 3, 2026, the Phillies traded Hoffman to the Kansas City Royals in exchange for Manuel Colon.

== See also ==
- Rule 5 draft results
