= Jayden Murray =

American baseball player (born 1997)

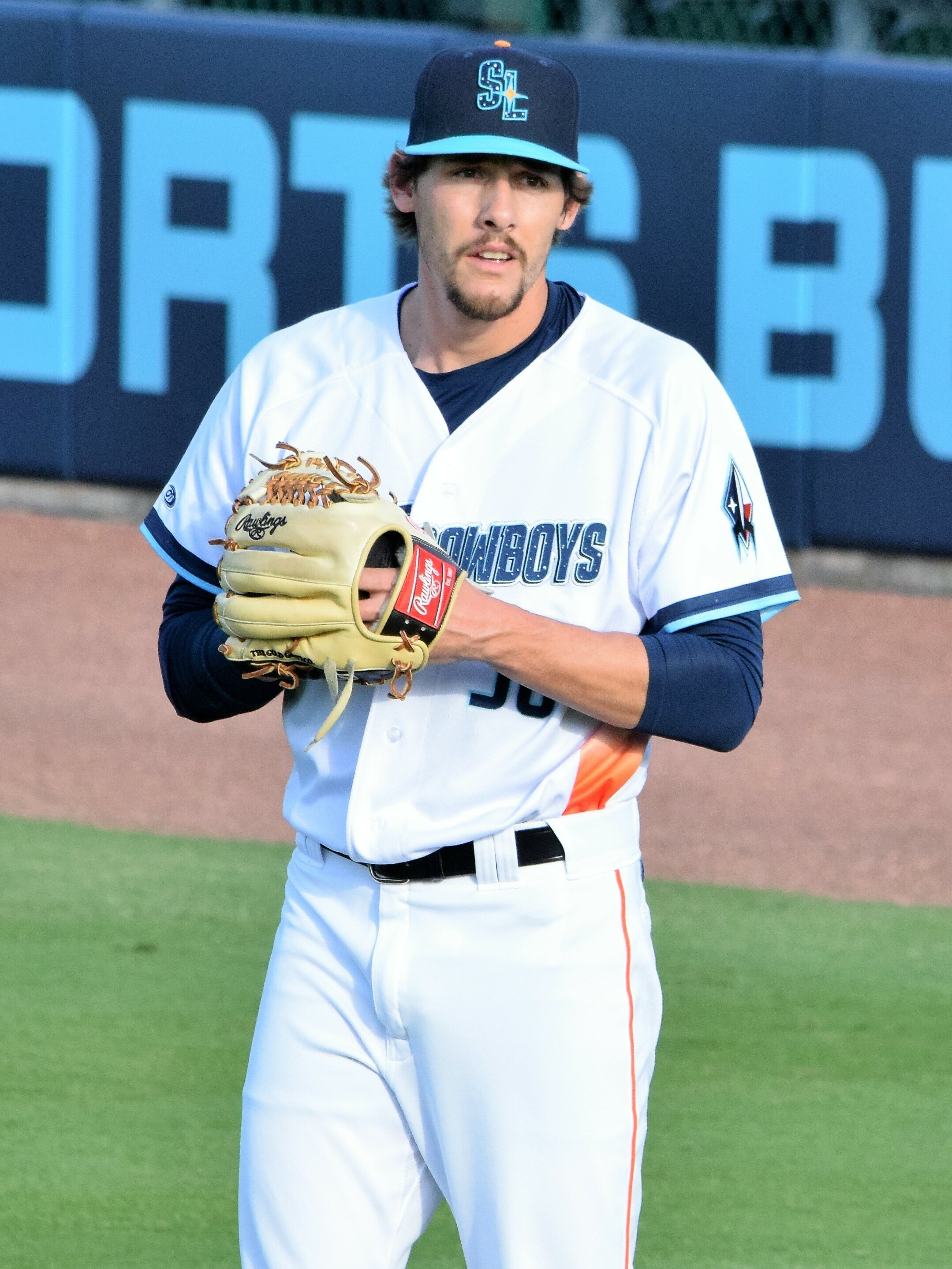
- Murray with the Sugar Land Space Cowboys in 2023

Chicago Cubs – No. 70
- Pitcher
- Born: April 11, 1997 (age 29); Vernal, Utah, U.S.
- Bats: Right Throws: Right

MLB debut
- September 4, 2025, for the Houston Astros

MLB statistics (through 2026 season)
- Win–loss record: 0–0
- Earned run average: 6.11
- Strikeouts: 22
- Stats at Baseball Reference

Teams
- Houston Astros (2025–2026); Chicago Cubs (2026–present)

Jayden Allen Murray (born April 11, 1997) is an American professional baseball pitcher for the Chicago Cubs of Major League Baseball (MLB). He made his MLB debut in 2025 with the Houston Astros.

== Amateur career ==
Murray attended Uintah High School in Vernal, Utah, and played college baseball at Arizona Western College and Dixie State University. As a senior at Dixie State in 2019, he went 10–3 with a 3.78 ERA and 92 strikeouts over 83 1/3 innings.

== Professional career ==
=== Tampa Bay Rays ===
Murray was drafted by the Tampa Bay Rays in the 23rd round, with the 698th overall selection, of the 2019 Major League Baseball draft. He signed with the Rays and made his professional debut with the rookie-level Princeton Rays before he was promoted to the Low-A Hudson Valley Renegades. Over 40 1/3 innings between the two affiliates, he went 1–2 with a 2.45 ERA and 47 strikeouts. Murray did not play in a game in 2020 due to the cancellation of the minor league season because of the COVID-19 pandemic.

Murray split the 2021 season between the High-A Bowling Green Hot Rods and Double-A Montgomery Biscuits. Over twenty starts between the two affiliates, Murray posted an 8–3 record with a 2.16 ERA and 96 strikeouts across 96 innings pitched. He returned to Montgomery to open the 2022 season and was promoted to the Triple-A Durham Bulls in late July.

=== Houston Astros ===
The Rays traded Murray to the Houston Astros in a three-team trade on August 1, 2022, in which the Astros acquired Trey Mancini from the Baltimore Orioles, the Orioles acquired Chayce McDermott from Houston and Seth Johnson from the Tampa Bay Rays, and the Rays also acquired José Siri from the Astros. The Astros subsequently assigned him to the Double-A Corpus Christi Hooks. Over 23 games (22 starts) between Montgomery, Durham, and Corpus Christi, Murray went 8–5 with a 3.50 ERA and 99 strikeouts across 108 innings of work. To open the 2023 season, he was assigned to the Triple-A Sugar Land Space Cowboys. Murray missed time during the season due to injuries and pitched a total of 41 1/3 innings, going 2–4 with an 8.27 ERA. In 2024, he pitched only three innings for the season.

Murray opened the 2025 season with Sugar Land, recording a 4.64 ERA with 66 strikeouts and three saves across 50 appearances out of the bullpen. On September 3, 2025, the Astros promoted Murray to the major leagues. He debuted the following day at Daikin Park against the New York Yankees, pitching 1 1/3 scoreless innings and recording a single strikeout. Over 11 2/3 innings pitched for the Astros, Murray posted a 1.54 ERA and eight strikeouts.

Murray was optioned to Triple-A Sugar Land to begin the 2026 season. He made eight appearances for Houston, but struggled to a 7.43 ERA with eight strikeouts across 13 1/3 innings pitched. On June 16, 2026, Murray was designated for assignment by the Astros.

=== Chicago Cubs ===
On June 20, 2026, Murray was traded to the Chicago Cubs in exchange for Cameron Sisneros. He made two relief appearances for the Cubs and gave up six runs across three innings pitched before he was optioned to the Triple-A Iowa Cubs. Murray played the remainder of the season with Iowa and had a 2–0 record, a 4.71 ERA, and 32 strikeouts across 28 2/3 innings.
