= Kaleb Ort =

American baseball player (born 1992)

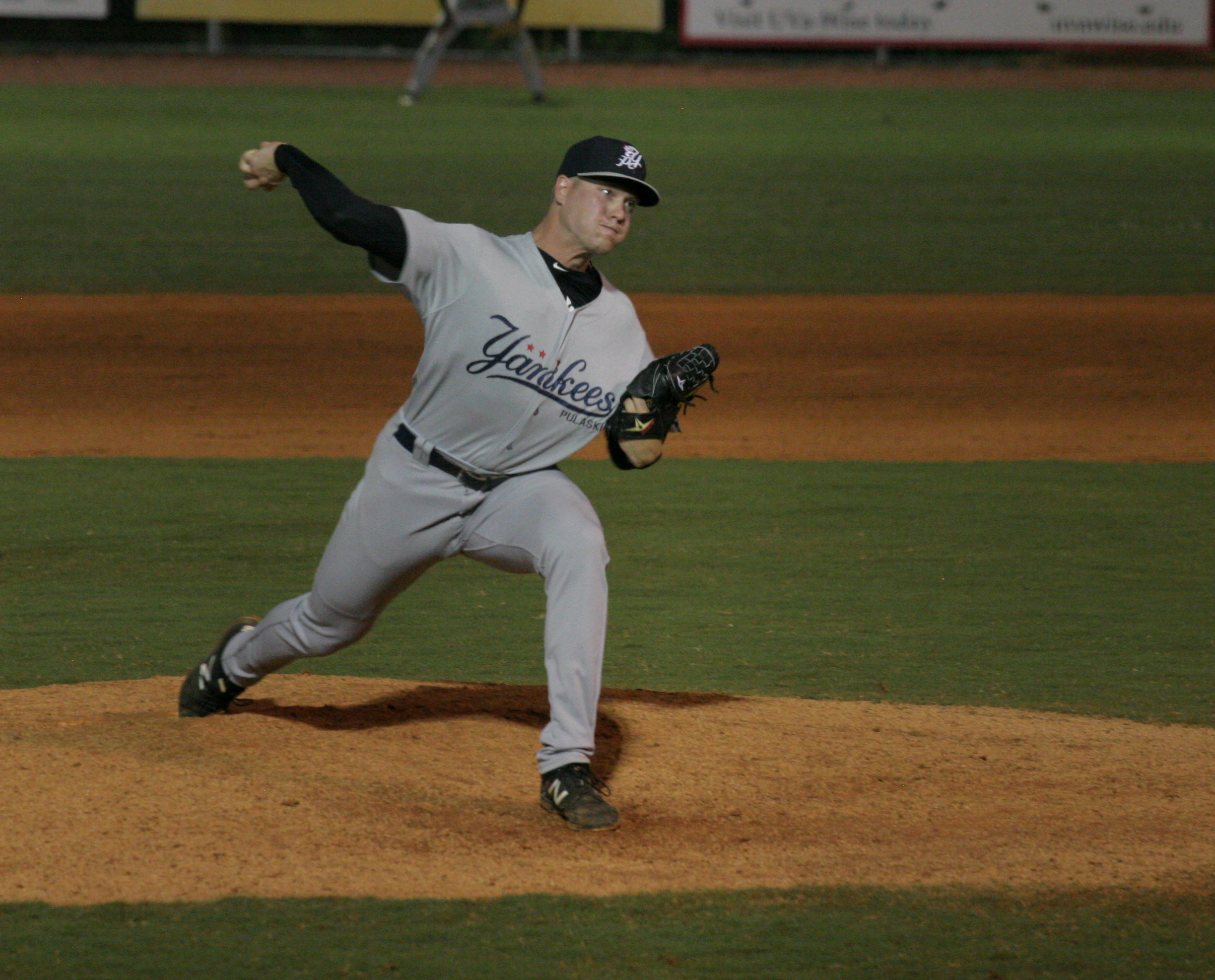
- Ort with the Pulaski Yankees in 2017

Free agent
- Pitcher
- Born: February 5, 1992 (age 34); Grand Rapids, Michigan, U.S.
- Bats: Right Throws: Right

MLB debut
- September 13, 2021, for the Boston Red Sox

MLB statistics (through 2025 season)
- Win–loss record: 5–7
- Earned run average: 5.00
- Strikeouts: 126
- Stats at Baseball Reference

Teams
- Boston Red Sox (2021–2023); Houston Astros (2024–2025)

Kaleb James Ort (born February 5, 1992) is an American professional baseball pitcher who is a free agent. He has previously played in Major League Baseball (MLB) for the Boston Red Sox and Houston Astros. Listed at 6 feet 4 inches (1.93 m) and 240 pounds (110 kg), he throws and bats right-handed.

== Career ==
=== Amateur ===
Ort grew up in Lowell, Michigan, and graduated from Lowell High School. He played college baseball for Aquinas College in Grand Rapids, Michigan. He was not selected in the MLB draft out of Aquinas due to an elbow injury.

=== Joliet Slammers ===
On October 7, 2015, Ort signed with the Joliet Slammers of the independent Frontier League. In his first professional season, he appeared in 20 games, starting 12, and posted a 3–4 win–loss record and a 6.05 earned run average (ERA) with 61 strikeouts in as many innings pitched.

On September 23, 2016, Ort signed a minor league contract with the Arizona Diamondbacks. However, he did not make an appearance for the organization before he was released on March 21, 2017. After returning to Joliet, he made one appearance for the team in 2017, tossing two scoreless innings and striking out three batters.

=== New York Yankees ===
On May 16, 2017, Ort signed a minor league contract with the New York Yankees organization. He spent the remainder of the season split between the rookie-level Pulaski Yankees and the Low-A Staten Island Yankees, accumulating a 3-0 record and 1.38 ERA with 39 strikeouts and 10 saves in 26.0 innings pitched. In 2018, Ort made 35 appearances between the High-A Tampa Tarpons and Double-A Trenton Thunder, working to a combined 2-2 record and 3.74 ERA with 69 strikeouts and 3 saves in 55.1 innings pitched.

Ort played the 2019 season with Staten Island, Trenton, and the Triple-A Scranton/Wilkes-Barre RailRiders, pitching to a 6-0 record and 3.40 ERA with 78 strikeouts and 4 saves in 50.1 innings of work. He did not play in a game in 2020 due to the cancellation of the minor league season because of the COVID-19 pandemic.

=== Boston Red Sox ===
On December 10, 2020, Ort was selected by the Boston Red Sox during the minor-league phase of the Rule 5 draft. Ort opened the 2021 season in Triple-A with the Worcester Red Sox. On September 10, the Red Sox added Ort to their active roster. He made his major-league debut on September 13; pitching in relief against the Seattle Mariners, he allowed one hit and no runs in 1/3 of an inning. Ort was returned to Worcester, and removed from the 40-man roster, on September 14. In 42 relief appearances with Worcester, Ort recorded 19 saves with a 2.98 earned run average (ERA) while striking out 62 batters in 45 1/3 innings pitched.

Ort returned to Worcester to begin the 2022 season, pitching out of the bullpen as a closer. He was added to Boston's active roster on July 9, and made his first MLB appearance of the season the next day. He split time between Worcester and Boston during August, and spent almost all of September with Boston. On September 29, Ort recorded his first MLB save by pitching a scoreless ninth inning against the Baltimore Orioles. In 25 relief appearances with Boston, Ort pitched to a 1–2 record with one save and a 6.35 ERA while striking out 27 batters in 28 1/3 innings.

Ort began the 2023 season on Boston's major-league roster, and worked out of the bullpen until being optioned to Worcester on April 30. He was briefly with Boston in early May and early June, then recalled on June 18 when Tanner Houck was placed on the injured list. Ort was placed on the injured list with right elbow inflammation on July 7, and transferred to the 60–day IL on July 26. On October 11, Ort was removed from the 40–man roster and placed on outright waivers.

=== Baltimore Orioles ===
After being released by Boston, Ort was claimed off waivers by four other teams before reaching the major leagues again.

On October 13, 2023, Ort was claimed off waivers by the Seattle Mariners. On December 2, he was again claimed off waivers, this time by the Miami Marlins. The Marlins subsequently designated him for assignment on February 7, 2024, and he was claimed off waivers for a third time on February 13, by the Philadelphia Phillies. The Phillies designated him for assignment themselves on February 19 and he was traded to the Baltimore Orioles for cash considerations later that day. He was optioned to the Triple–A Norfolk Tides to begin the 2024 season. Ort earned a save when he, Chayce McDermott and Nolan Hoffman achieved a combined no-hitter in a 2–0 Tides away win over the Nashville Sounds on May 3. In 14 games for Norfolk, he struggled to a 12.08 ERA with 16 strikeouts across 12 2/3 innings pitched.

=== Houston Astros ===
On May 28, 2024, Ort was claimed off waivers by the Houston Astros. The Astros then assigned him to the Triple-A Sugar Land Space Cowboys, and on July 29, recalled Ort to the major league roster. He made 22 appearances for Houston and tossed 24 2/3 innings, posting a 1–1 record, 2.55 ERA, 26 strikeouts, four walks, and a 0.811 WHIP. Each of the seven runs he surrendered were via a solo home run and were earned.

Due to an oblique strain, Ort began the 2025 season on the injured list. He was activated on April 27, 2025. In 49 appearances for Houston, Ort logged a 2-2 record and 4.89 ERA with 49 strikeouts and one save over 46 innings of work. On September 6, he was placed on the injured list due to right elbow inflammation. Ort was transferred to the 60-day injured list on September 19, ending his season.

On January 2, 2026, Ort was designated for assignment by the Astros following the signing of Tatsuya Imai.

=== Los Angeles Angels ===
On January 9, 2026, Ort was claimed off waivers by the New York Yankees. He was designated for assignment by the Yankees on January 23. Ort was claimed off waivers by the Los Angeles Angels on January 28. He was designated for assignment following the signing of Brent Suter on February 6. Ort cleared waivers and was sent outright to the Triple-A Salt Lake Bees on February 9. In 57 games (1 start) with Triple-A Salt Lake Bees he threw 58 innings going 6-5 with a 6.05 ERA with 71 strikeouts and 10 saves. He elected free agency on November 2.

== See also ==
- Rule 5 draft results
