= Jose Siri =

Dominican baseball player (born 1995)

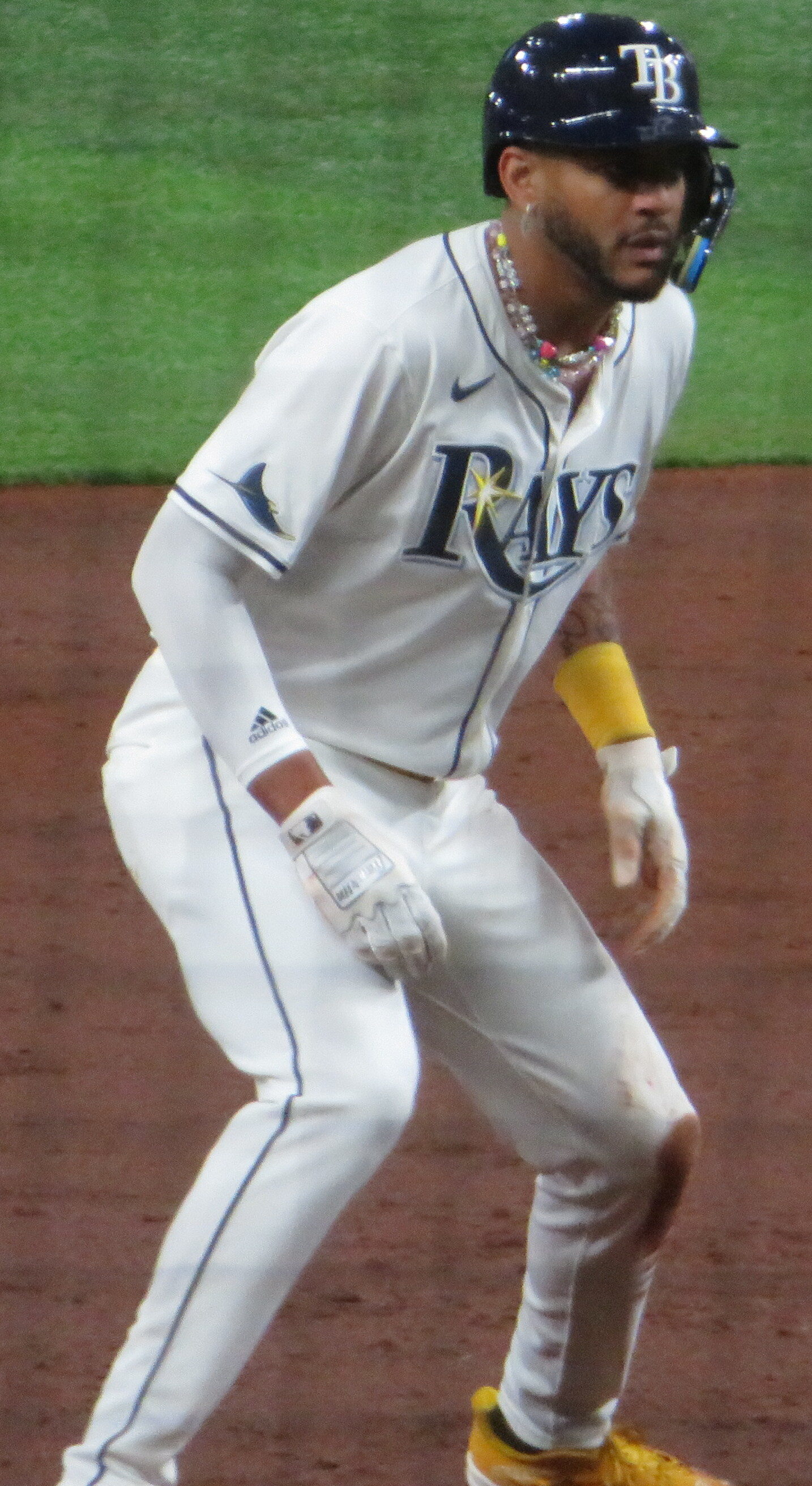
- Siri with the Tampa Bay Rays in 2024

Los Angeles Angels – No. 28
- Center fielder
- Born: July 22, 1995 (age 31); Sabana Grande de Boyá, Dominican Republic
- Bats: Right Throws: Right

MLB debut
- September 3, 2021, for the Houston Astros

MLB statistics (through 2026 season)
- Batting average: .212
- Home runs: 64
- Runs batted in: 170
- Stats at Baseball Reference

Teams
- Houston Astros (2021–2022); Tampa Bay Rays (2022–2024); New York Mets (2025); Los Angeles Angels (2026–present)

Jose Alexander Siri (born July 22, 1995) is a Dominican professional baseball center fielder for the Los Angeles Angels of Major League Baseball (MLB). He has previously played in MLB for the Houston Astros, Tampa Bay Rays, and New York Mets. He made his MLB debut in 2021 with the Astros.

== Career ==
=== Cincinnati Reds ===
Siri signed with the Cincinnati Reds as an international free agent on September 21, 2012. He made his professional debut the next year with the Dominican Summer League Reds. He spent the 2014 season with the Arizona League Reds, hitting .248/.310/.376 in 46 games. He played in 46 games the following year with the AZL Reds and the rookie-level Billings Mustangs, slashing .244/.261/.438 with 3 home runs and 19 RBI. Siri split the 2016 season between Billings and the Single-A Dayton Dragons, hitting a cumulative .275/.301/.463 with 10 home runs and 38 RBI in 86 games. Siri began the 2017 season with Dayton. During the season, he broke the Midwest League record for consecutive games with a hit. The record was previously held by Tony Toups with 35 in 1977. He batted .293 with Dayton, leading the league in runs (92) and stolen bases (46). The Reds added him to their 40-man roster after the season on November 20, 2017.

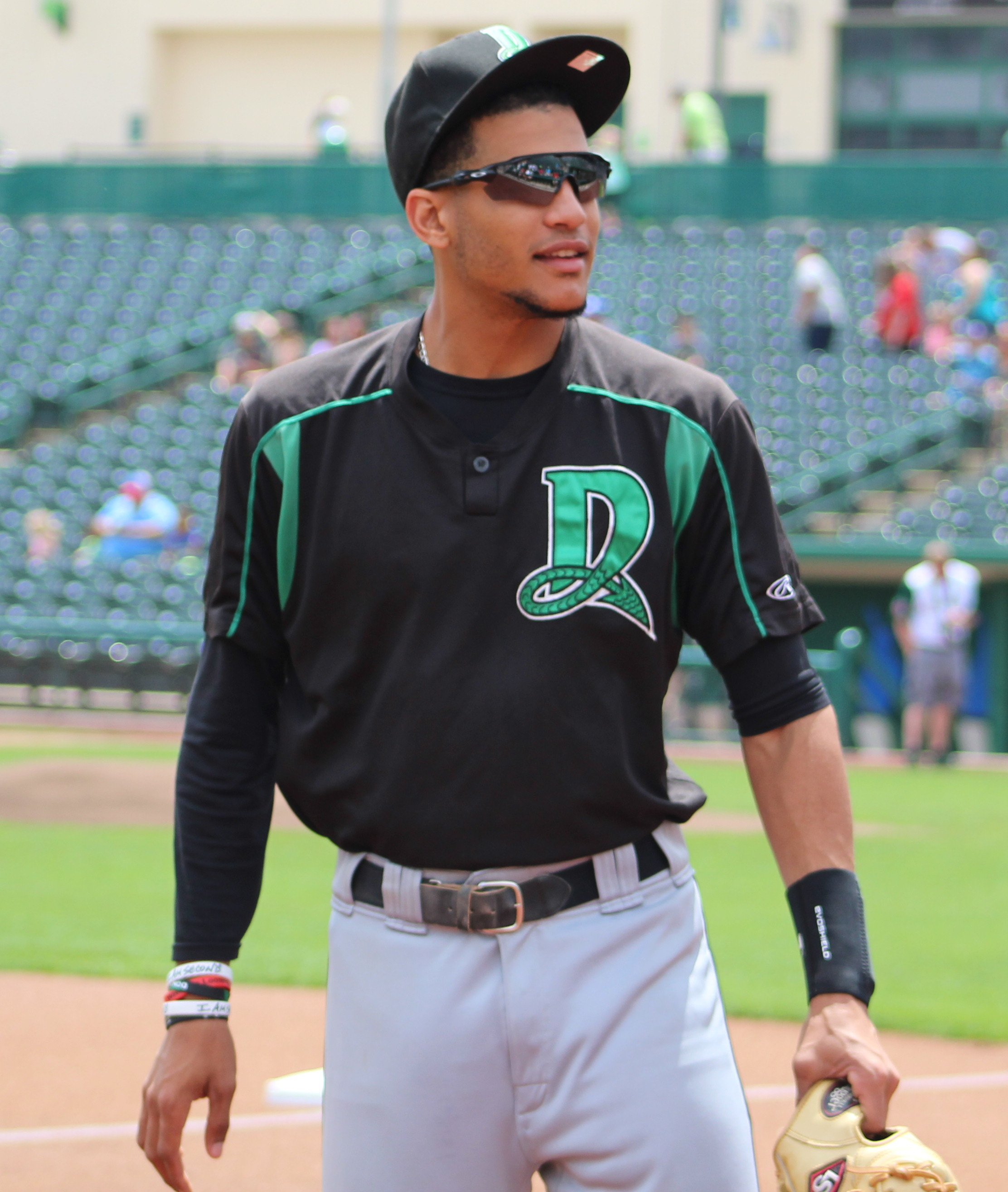
Siri with the Dayton Dragons in 2017

In 2018, Siri split the season between the High-A Daytona Tortugas and the Double-A Pensacola Blue Wahoos, hitting .239/.294/.449 with 13 home runs and 43 RBI in 96 games between the two teams. He split 2019 between the Double-A Chattanooga Lookouts and the Triple-A Louisville Bats, logging a .237/.300/.357 slash line with 11 home runs and 53 RBI in 131 games. On January 27, 2020, Siri was designated for assignment by the Reds.

On February 3, 2020, Siri was claimed off waivers by the Seattle Mariners. On March 10, Siri was claimed off waivers by the San Francisco Giants. On July 23, Siri was designated for assignment by the Giants. He was outrighted on July 30. Siri did not play in a game in 2020 due to the cancellation of the minor league season because of the COVID-19 pandemic. He became a free agent after the season on November 2, 2020.

=== Houston Astros ===
On December 23, 2020, Siri signed a minor league contract with the Houston Astros organization. In 2021, Siri began the season with the Triple-A Sugar Land Skeeters. He played in 94 games for the Skeeters, batting .318/.369/.552 with 16 home runs, 72 RBI, and 24 stolen bases in 27 attempts.

On September 2, 2021, it was announced that Siri would be promoted from Triple-A to the major leagues for the first time. The next day, he was put in as a pinch runner in the 9th inning against the San Diego Padres to make his MLB debut. Jake Meyers promptly hit a single that scored Siri from second base to give Siri his first run as a major leaguer. Siri made his first start in the majors on September 13 in left field. Facing the Texas Rangers, he went 4-for-5 with two home runs and five RBI. He was the first player since the RBI statistic became official in 1920 to have that many RBI along with multiple home runs in their first-ever start as a major leaguer. In 2021 with the Astros, he batted .304/.347/.609 with four home runs, nine RBI, one walk, and 17 strikeouts in 46 at-bats.

Siri made the Astros' 2022 Opening Day roster. On April 12, he hit a home run in the fifth inning off Arizona Diamondbacks starter Madison Bumgarner that traveled a Statcast-projected 456 feet (139 m) onto the left-center-field concourse with an exit velocity of 109.7 miles per hour (176.5 km/h), his second-hardest hit in 24 big league games. Siri also singled in the ninth inning and scored the game-winning run for a 2–1 victory. He doubled and collected two hits, a stolen base and scored a run on May 25 versus the Cleveland Guardians to lead an Astros 2–1 win.

Siri also returned to play for Sugar Land in 2022. In 16 games, he batted .296/.346/.775 with nine home runs and 22 RBI.

=== Tampa Bay Rays ===
The Astros traded Siri to the Tampa Bay Rays in a three-team deal on August 1, 2022, in which the Baltimore Orioles acquired Seth Johnson from Tampa Bay, the Astros acquired Trey Mancini from Baltimore and Jayden Murray from Tampa Bay, and the Orioles also acquired Chayce McDermott from the Astros.

In 2022 between Houston and Tampa Bay, he batted .213/.268/.339 with 7 home runs, 24 RBI, and 14 stolen bases in 16 attempts. He had the fastest sprint speed of all major league center fielders, at 30.4 feet/second.

In a game against the Milwaukee Brewers on April 30, 2024, Siri was involved in an altercation with Brewers pitcher Abner Uribe. In a contentious game which Brewers manager Pat Murphy and pitcher Freddy Peralta had already been ejected from, an otherwise routine ground ball play at first led to Uribe and Siri exchanging words. The situation became suddenly chaotic when Uribe threw a punch at Siri, igniting a benches-clearing brawl. Both Uribe and Siri were ejected for their parts in the brawl, and Siri received a five game suspension. He played in a career–high 130 games for Tampa Bay in 2024, slashing .187/.255/.366 with 18 home runs, 47 RBI, and 14 stolen bases.

=== New York Mets ===
On November 19, 2024, the Rays traded Siri to the New York Mets in exchange for Eric Orze. Siri earned on a spot on the bench on the Opening Day roster. On April 21, 2025, the Mets announced that Siri would miss 8–10 weeks due to a left tibia fracture. He was transferred to the 60-day injured list on June 23. Siri was activated on September 9. In 16 total appearances for New York, he went 2-for-32 (.063) with one RBI, two stolen bases, and four walks. Siri was designated for assignment by the Mets on September 24. He cleared waivers and was sent outright to the Triple-A Syracuse Mets on September 27. Siri elected free agency on September 29.

=== Los Angeles Angels ===
On February 1, 2026, Siri signed a minor league contract with the Los Angeles Angels. In 32 appearances for the Triple-A Salt Lake Bees, he slashed .288/.353/.504 with five home runs, 27 RBI, and four stolen bases. On May 16, the Angels selected Siri's contract, adding him to their active roster.

== See also ==
- List of Major League Baseball players from the Dominican Republic
