= Ridgeback (brand) =

British bicycle brand

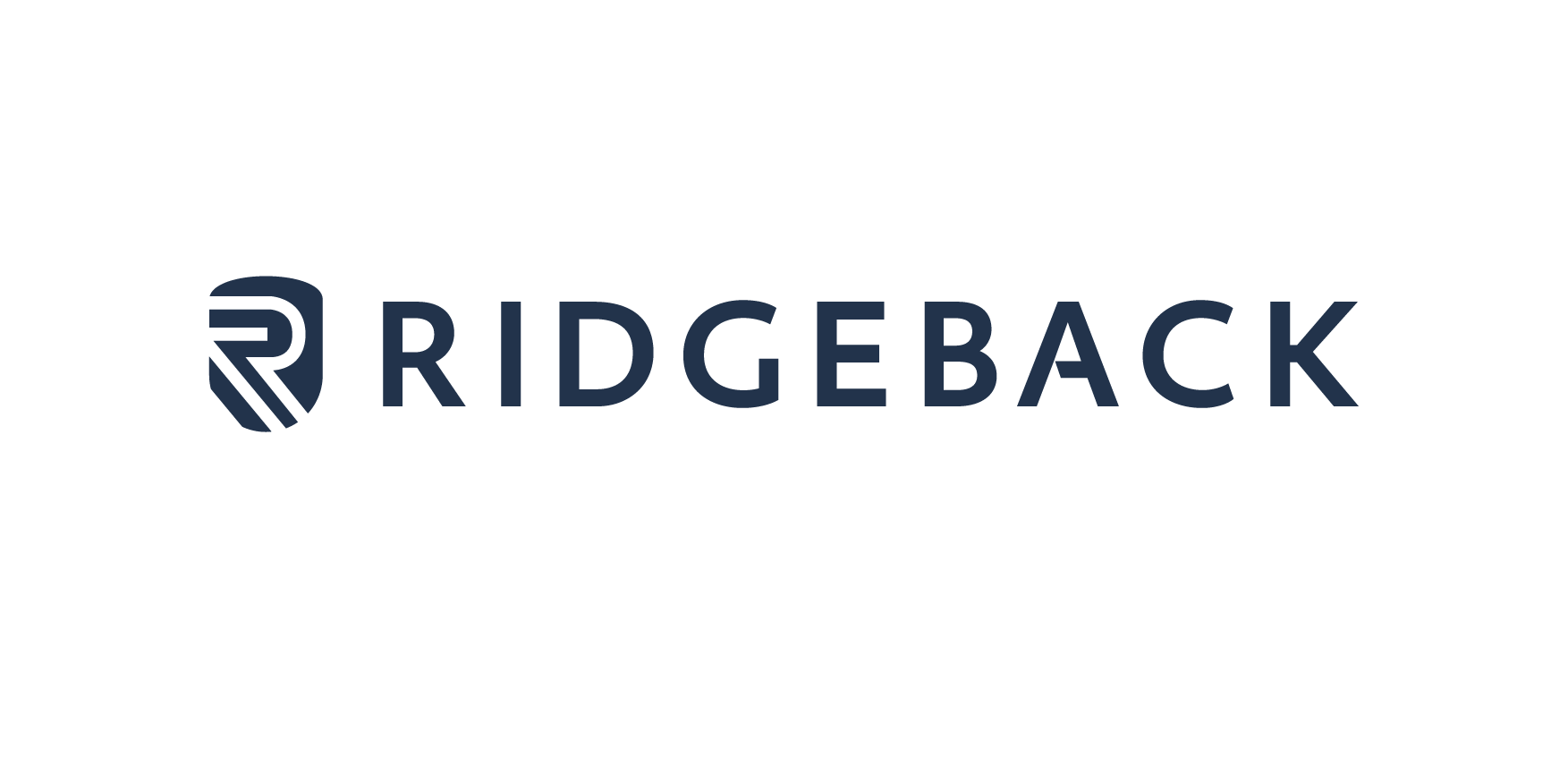
- Type: Private
- Industry: Bicycles
- Founded: 1983
- Headquarters: Milton Keynes, England, UK
- Key people: Errol Drew (founder)
- Products: Bicycles
- Website: www.ridgeback.co.uk

Ridgeback is a British bicycle brand manufacturing road, urban, utility, youth and mountain models. Their bikes are distributed by Sportline UK which is owned by H Young Holdings. Sportline UK also owns the Genesis and Saracen cycle brands.

== History ==
Ridgeback's founder Errol Drew created the first UK mountain bike in 1983. Drew first spotted a mountain bike at the 1982 New York Bike Show, where he declared it "the future of cycling".

Ridgeback's next major development was the creation of the flat handlebar road bike.

In 2001, Ridgeback introduced the Genesis Day One model. In 2006 Genesis marque became a separate brand.

In 2008, Ridgeback was one of the first to introduce disc brakes to its flat handlebar road range. And in 2015 Ridgeback launched Rapide – a range of performance road bikes.

In 2014, Ridgeback was the 5th most stolen bike in the UK. In 2020, Ridgeback Velocity was the 4th most stolen bike in the UK.

In 2023 Ridgeback celebrated 40 years - https://singletrackworld.com/2023/03/retro-ridgeback-gallery-and-video-walkthrough/

In 2026 Ridgeback launched a completely redesigned, all-new kids' bike platform for 2026. Developed using sizing data from the Department of Health and the Royal College of Paediatrics, the new line features updated child-specific geometry, fresh colourways, new accessories, and a lifetime frame and fork warranty to help young riders transition to larger bikes with more confidence.
