= Seth Johnson (baseball) =

American baseball player (born 1998)

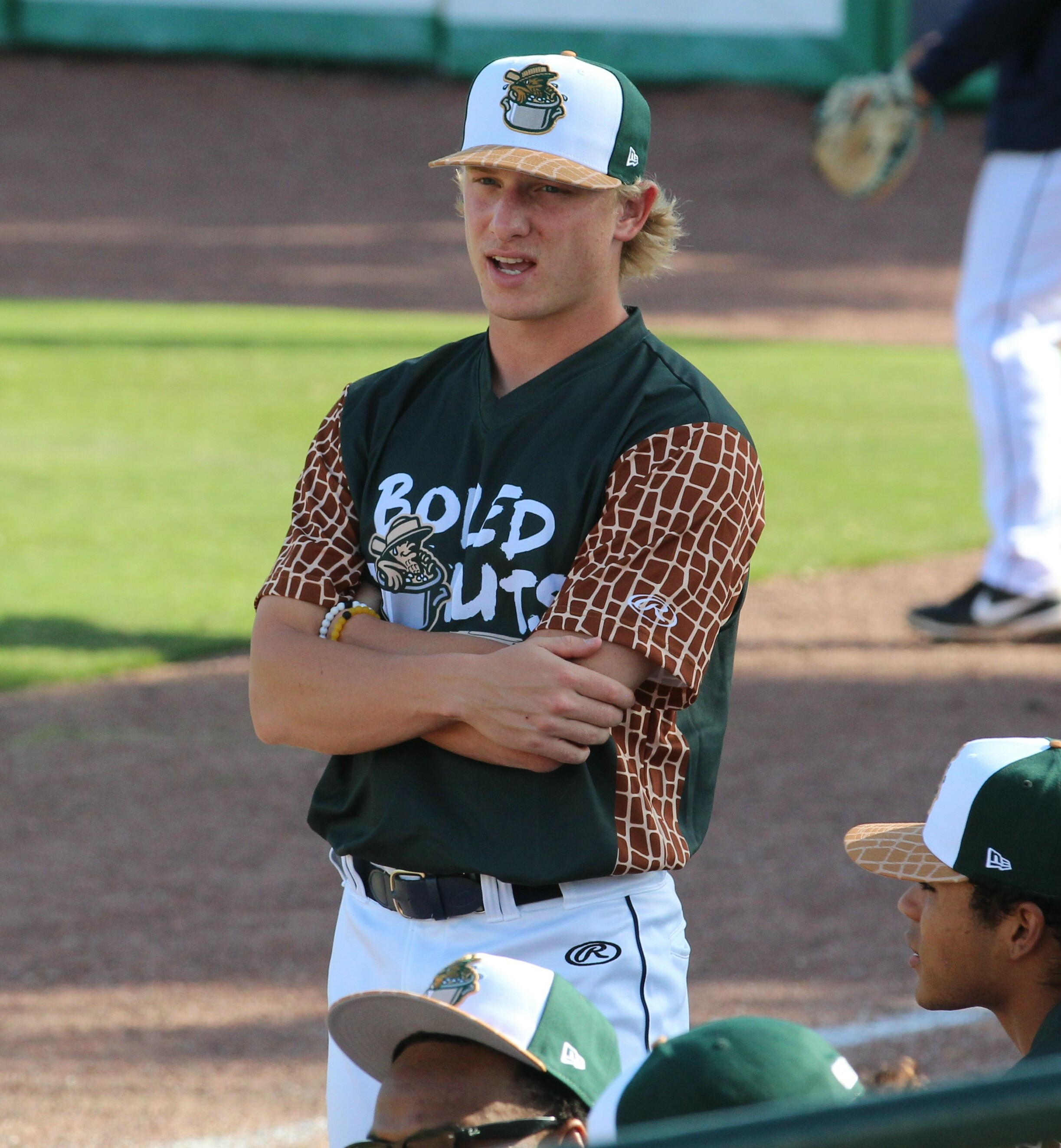
- Johnson with the Charleston RiverDogs in 2021

Athletics – No. 52
- Pitcher
- Born: September 19, 1998 (age 28); Concord, North Carolina, U.S.
- Bats: Right Throws: Right

MLB debut
- September 8, 2024, for the Philadelphia Phillies

MLB statistics (through 2026 season)
- Win–loss record: 2–2
- Earned run average: 6.84
- Strikeouts: 57
- Stats at Baseball Reference

Teams
- Philadelphia Phillies (2024–2026); Athletics (2026–present)

Seth William Johnson (born September 19, 1998) is an American professional baseball pitcher for the Athletics of Major League Baseball (MLB). He made his MLB debut in 2024 for the Philadelphia Phillies.

== Amateur career ==
Johnson attended Jay M. Robinson High School in Concord, North Carolina, where he played baseball. After graduating in 2016, he enrolled at Louisburg College. At Louisburg, he played mainly as a shortstop, hitting a combined .254 with nine home runs in his two seasons there. During his career at Louisburg, he pitched a total of six innings. After his sophomore year, he transferred to Campbell University and began focusing solely on pitching. In 2019, his junior year at Campbell, he appeared in 14 games (11 starts), going 3–3 with a 4.61 ERA, striking out 81 batters over 66 1/3 innings.

== Professional career ==
=== Tampa Bay Rays ===
The Tampa Bay Rays selected Johnson with the 40th overall pick in the 2019 Major League Baseball draft. He received a signing bonus of $1.72 million and made his professional debut with the Rookie-level Gulf Coast League Rays. After pitching ten scoreless innings over five games, he was promoted to the Princeton Rays of the Rookie Advanced Appalachian League in August, with whom he finished the season, going 0–1 with a 5.14 ERA over seven innings.

Johnson did not play a minor league game in 2020 due to the cancellation of the minor league season caused by the COVID-19 pandemic. He was assigned to the Charleston RiverDogs of the Low-A East for the 2021 season. He appeared in 23 games (making 16 starts), pitching to a 6–6 record, a 2.88 ERA, and 115 strikeouts over 93 2/3 innings. He was assigned to the Bowling Green Hot Rods of the High-A South Atlantic League to open the 2022 season. In late May, he was placed on the injured list with forearm inflammation. It was later announced that he had torn his ulnar collateral ligament in his elbow and would be undergoing Tommy John surgery. Over 27 innings prior to the injury, he posted a 3.00 ERA with 41 strikeouts.

=== Baltimore Orioles ===
The Rays traded Johnson to the Baltimore Orioles in a three-team trade on August 1, 2022, in which the Rays acquired José Siri from the Houston Astros, the Astros acquired Trey Mancini from Baltimore and Jayden Murray from Tampa Bay, and the Orioles also acquired Chayce McDermott from the Astros.

On November 15, 2022, the Orioles selected Johnson's contract and added him to the 40-man roster to protect him from the Rule 5 draft. Johnson was optioned to the Triple-A Norfolk Tides to begin the 2023 season. He made rehab appearances for the rookie–level Florida Complex League Orioles, Single–A Delmarva Shorebirds, High–A Aberdeen IronBirds, and Double–A Bowie Baysox as he continued his recovery from surgery. Johnson was again optioned to Triple–A Norfolk to begin the 2024 season. However, he instead began the campaign with Bowie, and compiled a 2.63 ERA as he was 0-6 with 35 walks and 61 strikeouts over 18 starts.

=== Philadelphia Phillies ===
On July 30, 2024, the Orioles traded Johnson and pitcher Moisés Chace to the Philadelphia Phillies in exchange for reliever Gregory Soto. He was promoted to the major leagues for the first time on September 8. In 2 1/3 innings in his first major league season he gave up eight hits, three walks, and nine earned runs.

Johnson was optioned to the Triple-A Lehigh Valley IronPigs to begin the 2025 season. He was recalled to Philadelphia on June 1, 2025, after Taijuan Walker was moved to the bullpen. On July 19, Johnson recorded his first career win, allowing one run over one inning of relief against the Los Angeles Angels. Johnson appeared in ten games for the Phillies, going 1-1 with a 4.26 ERA and 17 strikeouts over 12 2/3 innings. He pitched in 39 games for Lehigh Valley and went 5-5 with a 4.75 ERA, 67 strikeouts, and 35 walks over 60 2/3 innings.

Johnson was again optioned to Triple-A Lehigh Valley to begin the 2026 season. Johnson was recalled by the Phillies for the first time during the season on April 13. He was subsequently recalled and optioned multiple times by the Phillies during the season. Johnson made 16 relief appearances for the Phillies and had a 1-0 record, a 5.51 ERA, and 20 strikeouts.

=== Athletics ===
On August 3, 2026, Johnson was traded to the Athletics in exchange for Colby Thomas.
