= Chayce McDermott =

American baseball player (born 1998)

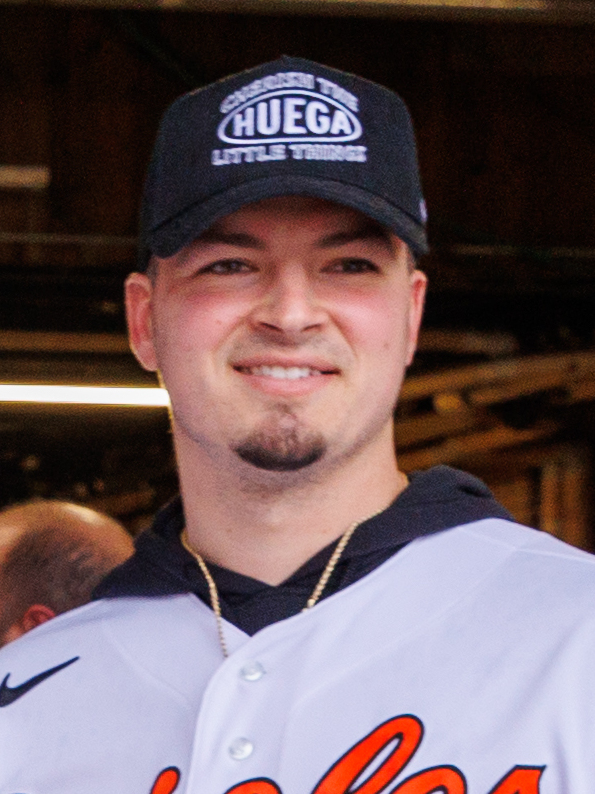
- McDermott with the Baltimore Orioles in 2025

Chicago Cubs
- Pitcher
- Born: August 22, 1998 (age 28); Anderson, Indiana, U.S.
- Bats: Left Throws: Right

MLB debut
- July 24, 2024, for the Baltimore Orioles

MLB statistics (through 2026 season)
- Win–loss record: 1–1
- Earned run average: 10.18
- Strikeouts: 18
- Stats at Baseball Reference

Teams
- Baltimore Orioles (2024–2025); Los Angeles Dodgers (2026); New York Mets (2026)

Chayce Michael McDermott (born August 22, 1998) is an American professional baseball pitcher for the Chicago Cubs of Major League Baseball (MLB). He has previously played in MLB for the Baltimore Orioles and Los Angeles Dodgers.

== Amateur career ==
McDermott grew up in Anderson, Indiana, and attended Pendleton Heights High School.

McDermott played college baseball at Ball State University. He tore the ulnar collateral ligament in his pitching elbow prior to the start of his freshman season, requiring him to undergo Tommy John surgery and redshirt the year. McDermott was limited in his redshirt freshman season due to post-surgery restrictions. As a redshirt junior, McDermott went 8–2 with a 3.05 ERA and 125 strikeouts in 82 2/2 innings pitched and was named second team All-Mid-American Conference.

== Professional career ==
=== Houston Astros ===
McDermott was selected in the 4th round, with the 132nd overall selection, by the Houston Astros in the 2021 Major League Baseball draft. He signed with the team on July 17, 2021, and received a $375,000 signing bonus. After signing, McDermott was assigned to the Rookie League Florida Complex League Astros, where he made one appearance before being promoted to the Low-A Fayetteville Woodpeckers.

McDermott began the 2022 campaign with the High–A Asheville Tourists. In 19 games (10 starts), he compiled a 6–1 record and 5.50 ERA with 114 strikeouts over 72 innings pitched.

=== Baltimore Orioles ===
The Astros traded McDermott to the Baltimore Orioles in a three-team trade on August 1, 2022, in which the Houston Astros acquired Trey Mancini from Baltimore and Jayden Murray from the Tampa Bay Rays, the Rays acquired José Siri from the Houston Astros, and the Orioles also acquired Seth Johnson from the Rays. The Orioles assigned him to the Aberdeen Ironbirds of the High-A South Atlantic League.

On May 19, 2023, while with the Double-A Bowie Baysox, McDermott was part of a combined no-hitter that was thrown against the Altoona Curve. McDermott was the starting pitcher for Bowie, with Nolan Hoffman and Easton Lucas pitching in relief to seal the no-hit bid. He made 26 appearances (20 starts) split between Bowie and the Triple–A Norfolk Tides in 2023, registering an 8–8 record and 3.10 ERA with 152 strikeouts.

McDermott had a career-high eleven strikeouts and took a perfect-game attempt into the seventh inning of a 2–0 Tides away win over the Nashville Sounds on May 3, 2024. It was also the second time in two consecutive years that he started a combined no-hitter, with Hoffman and Kaleb Ort coming out of the bullpen to complete the achievement. In 20 games (19 starts) for Norfolk, he compiled a 3.96 ERA with 129 strikeouts across 91 innings pitched. On July 24, 2024, McDermott was selected to the 40-man roster and promoted to the major leagues for the first time.

McDermott began the 2025 season on the injured list, and went to post a 6.21 ERA for Norfolk over 25 games (10 starts). He made four major league appearances in 2025, posting a 15.58 ERA in 8.2 innings.

Prior to the 2026 season, McDermott was converted into a relief pitcher. He was optioned to Triple-A Norfolk on March 3, 2026, prior to the start of the regular season. After struggling to a 6.75 ERA across five appearances, McDermott was designated for assignment by the Orioles on April 11.

=== Los Angeles Dodgers ===
On April 16, 2026, McDermott was traded to the Los Angeles Dodgers in exchange for rookie league pitcher Axel Pérez. He pitched 2 2/3 innings over two games for the Dodgers, allowing two runs on three hits; McDermott also recorded a 4.10 ERA in 26 1/3 innings across 27 games for the Triple–A Oklahoma City Comets. McDermott was designated for assignment by Los Angeles on July 31.

=== New York Mets ===
On August 3, 2026, McDermott was traded to the New York Mets in exchange for Ben Rortvedt.

=== Chicago Cubs ===
On November 19, 2026, McDermott was claimed off waivers by the Chicago Cubs.

== Personal life ==
McDermott's older brother, Sean, played in the National Basketball Association (NBA) for the Memphis Grizzlies. His uncle is long-time college coach, Linc Darner. His other uncle, Tige Darner, scored over 1,200 points for the Appalachian St Mountaineers.
