= Dino Restelli =

American baseball player (1924–2006)

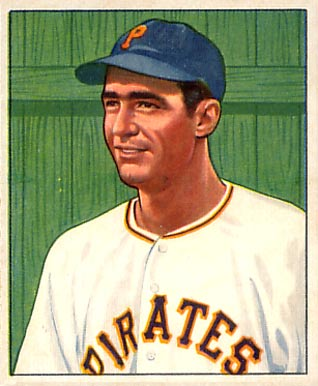
- Outfielder
- Born: September 23, 1924; St. Louis, Missouri, U.S.
- Died: August 8, 2006 (aged 81); San Carlos, California, U.S.
- Batted: Right Threw: Right

MLB debut
- June 14, 1949, for the Pittsburgh Pirates

Last MLB appearance
- June 12, 1951, for the Pittsburgh Pirates

MLB statistics
- Batting average: .241
- Home runs: 13
- Runs batted in: 43
- Stats at Baseball Reference

Teams
- Pittsburgh Pirates (1949, 1951)

Dino Paolo Restelli (September 23, 1924 – August 8, 2006), nicknamed "Dingo", was an American professional baseball player in 1944 and from 1946–1955 who appeared in Major League Baseball as an outfielder for the Pittsburgh Pirates in 1949 and 1951. He threw and batted right-handed, stood 6 feet 1 inch (1.85 m) tall, and weighed 191 pounds (87 kg).

Born in St. Louis, Missouri to Italian immigrants, he grew up in San Francisco, California and attended Santa Clara University. After World War II service in the United States Army, he became a baseball player with the San Francisco Seals of the Pacific Coast League, who traded him to the Pirates in June 1949.

Restelli achieved a measure of fame with the Pirates, when he hit a record seven home runs in his first ten games. He finished his rookie season with 12 home runs in 72 games. Restelli is tied with Trevor Story and Trey Mancini for most home runs through a players first 12 career games.

After his baseball career, he became a San Francisco police officer. He later settled in nearby San Carlos, California where he died at age 81 in 2006.
