= Easton Lucas =

American baseball player (born 1996)

Hanshin Tigers – No. 42
- Pitcher
- Born: September 23, 1996 (age 29); Thousand Oaks, California, U.S.
- Bats: Left Throws: Left

Professional debut
- MLB: September 8, 2023, for the Oakland Athletics
- NPB: April 1, 2026, for the Hanshin Tigers

MLB statistics (through 2025 season)
- Win–loss record: 4–3
- Earned run average: 8.02
- Strikeouts: 40

NPB statistics (through August 19, 2026)
- Win–loss record: 0–2
- Earned run average: 5.52
- Strikeouts: 15
- Stats at Baseball Reference

Teams
- Oakland Athletics (2023–2024); Detroit Tigers (2024); Toronto Blue Jays (2024–2025); Hanshin Tigers (2026–present)

Easton James Lucas (born September 23, 1996) is an American professional baseball pitcher for the Hanshin Tigers of Nippon Professional Baseball (NPB). He has previously played in Major League Baseball (MLB) for the Oakland Athletics, Detroit Tigers, and Toronto Blue Jays.

== Amateur career ==
Lucas attended Grace Brethren High School in Simi Valley, California. He enrolled at Pepperdine University to play college baseball for the Pepperdine Waves. In 2018, he played collegiate summer baseball with the Wareham Gatemen of the Cape Cod Baseball League, and was named a league all-star.

== Professional career ==
=== Miami Marlins ===
The Miami Marlins selected Lucas in the 14th round, with the 411th selection, of the 2019 Major League Baseball draft. Lucas spent his first professional season split between the rookie–level Gulf Coast League Marlins and Low–A Batavia Muckdogs. In 13 games (9 starts), Lucas registered a 3.63 ERA with 41 strikeouts in 34 2/3 innings pitched.

=== Baltimore Orioles ===
On December 2, 2019, the Marlins traded Lucas to the Baltimore Orioles for Jonathan Villar. Lucas did not play in a game in 2020 due to the cancellation of the minor league season because of the COVID-19 pandemic. He returned to action in 2021, and spent the season with the High–A Aberdeen IronBirds. In 27 appearances, Lucas logged a 3.96 ERA with 50 strikeouts and one save across 38 2/3 innings of work.

Lucas spent all of the 2022 season with the Double–A Bowie Baysox, recording a 4.76 ERA with 65 strikeouts in 56 2/3 innings across 32 contests. He returned to Bowie to begin the 2023 season. On May 19, 2023, while with the Baysox, Lucas, Chayce McDermott, and Nolan Hoffman threw a combined no-hitter against the Altoona Curve. On June 5, the Orioles promoted him to the Triple-A Norfolk Tides. In 20 combined games for Bowie and Norfolk, he registered a 2.73 ERA with 37 strikeouts and one save in 29 2/3 innings pitched.

=== Oakland Athletics ===
On July 19, 2023, the Orioles traded Lucas to the Oakland Athletics in exchange for Shintaro Fujinami. In 15 appearances for the Triple-A Las Vegas Aviators, he recorded a 5.63 ERA with 13 strikeouts in 16 innings pitched. On September 6, Lucas was selected to the 40-man roster and promoted to the major leagues for the first time. He made his major league debut on September 8. He made six appearances for Oakland, struggling to an 8.10 ERA with seven strikeouts in 6 2/3 innings of work. Following the season on November 6, Lucas was removed from the 40–man roster and sent outright to Triple–A Las Vegas.

On May 8, 2024, the Athletics selected Lucas' contract, adding him to their major league roster. In three appearances for the Athletics, he struggled to a 14.73 ERA with six strikeouts across 3 2/3 innings pitched. On May 16, Lucas was designated for assignment following the acquisition of Brandon Bielak.

=== Detroit Tigers ===
On May 18, 2024, Lucas was claimed off waivers by the Detroit Tigers. The Tigers sent him to the Triple-A Toledo Mud Hens. The team promoted Lucas to the major leagues on June 25, but optioned him back to Toledo the next day without making a major league appearance. After appearing in three games for the Tigers in July, Lucas was designated for assignment on August 16.

=== Toronto Blue Jays ===
On August 19, 2024, Lucas was claimed off waivers by the Toronto Blue Jays. In two appearances for the Blue Jays, he struggled to an 11.57 ERA with two strikeouts across 4 2/3 innings pitched.

Lucas was optioned to the Triple-A Buffalo Bisons to begin the 2025 season. He was called up to the majors after Max Scherzer was placed on the injured list. On April 2, 2025, Lucas made his first start in the majors against the Washington Nationals and proceeded to pitch five scoreless innings, allowing one hit and striking three out, en route to earning his first win of the season. He was optioned to Buffalo on June 1, and recalled to Toronto on August 30. Lucas made six total appearances (five starts) for Toronto during the regular season, logging a 3-3 record and 6.66 ERA with 23 strikeouts across 24 1/3 innings pitched. Lucas was placed on unconditional release waivers by the Blue Jays on November 25.

=== Hanshin Tigers ===
On November 27, 2025, Lucas signed with the Hanshin Tigers of Nippon Professional Baseball.
