= Moisés Chace =

Free agent
- Pitcher
- Born: June 9, 2003 (age 23); La Guaira, Venezuela
- Bats: Right Throws: Right

Moisés Alejandro Chace (born June 9, 2003) is a Venezuelan professional baseball pitcher who is a free agent.

== Career ==
Chace signed with the Baltimore Orioles as an international free agent on July 2, 2019. He did not play in a game in 2020 due to the cancellation of the minor league season because of the COVID-19 pandemic. Chace made his professional debut with the Florida Complex League Orioles in 2021. Chace spent the 2022 season with the Delmarva Shorebirds of the Single-A Carolina League, posting a 4.98 ERA in 59.2 innings over 19 appearances around two injured list stints. Returning to Delmarva for the 2023 season, he produced similar numbers, finishing with a 4.50 ERA in 68 across 21 outings.

Chace began the 2024 season with the Aberdeen Ironbirds of the High-A South Atlantic League.

On July 30, 2024, Chace was traded to the Philadelphia Phillies along with Seth Johnson in exchange for Gregory Soto. He was assigned to the High–A Jersey Shore BlueClaws before being promoted to the Reading Fightin Phils of the Double-A Eastern League in August. On November 19, the Phillies added Chace to their 40-man roster to protect him from the Rule 5 draft.

Chace was optioned to Double-A Reading to begin the 2025 season. In six starts for Reading, he recorded a 3.24 ERA with 19 strikeouts across 16 2/3 innings pitched. On May 16, it was announced that Chace would undergo Tommy John surgery, ending his season.

Chace was again optioned to Reading to begin the 2026 season as he continued to recover from surgery. On November 20, 2026, he was non-tendered by the Phillies and became a free agent.
