= Genesis (bicycle company) =

British bicycle brand

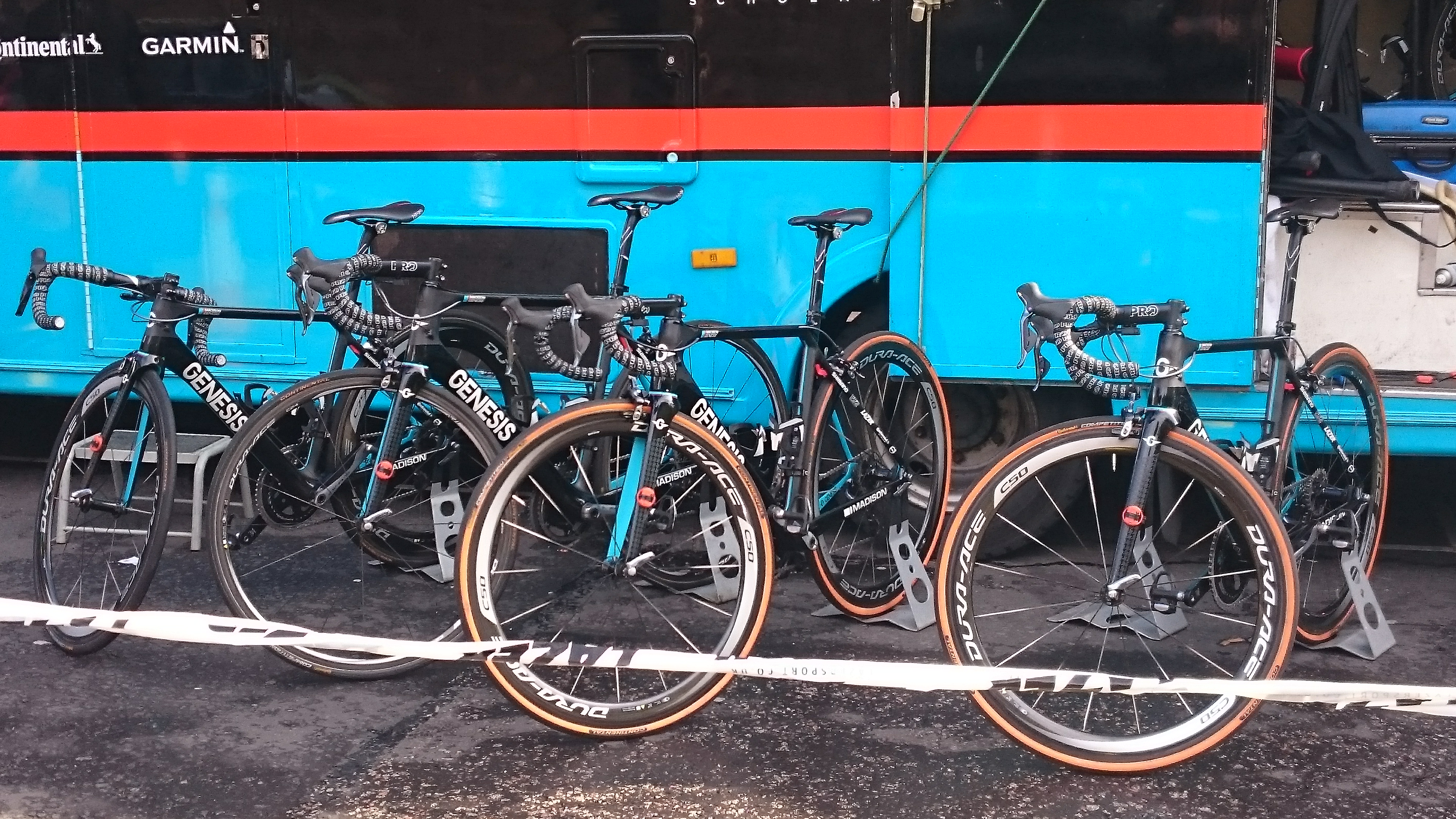
The Genesis bicycles used by the Madison Genesis team at the Edinburgh round of the Tour Series in May 2016

Founded in 2006, Genesis is a UK bike brand manufacturing adventure & gravel, road, urban/utility, e-bike and touring models.

Genesis is distributed by Sportline UK which is owned by H Young Holdings. Sportline UK also owns Saracen and Ridgeback cycle brands.

== History ==
The first Genesis bike was produced under the Ridgeback brand as the Day One model in 2001. Due to its popularity, Genesis became a label in its own right in 2006.

In 2008 the original Croix De Fer was released.

In 2012 Victoria Wilkinson won the Three Peaks cyclo-cross on a borrowed Vapour disc after her bike was damaged in a crash, highlighting the brand's reliability.

In 2013 Genesis became the title sponsor of the brand-new Madison Genesis cycling team.

In 2015 Madison Genesis win the Tour Series and by 2018 Connor Swift won the British road race championship on his Genesis Zero SL.

Over ten years the range expanded beyond commuter bikes to include road, mountain, cyclo-cross, gravel, kids and fat bikes.

Genesis bikes became renowned for their use of steel tubing and ethos for function over form.

The bikes have been designed by James Olsen (2005-2011), Dom Thomas (2011-2013) and Albert Steward (2013-2015) and Sam Lawson (2015-) and Ryan Carroll (2011-).

== Croix de Fer ==
In 2008 Genesis launched its most successful model, the Croix de Fer. The steel drop bar model, which could take wide tyres, guards and disc brakes was an early incarnation of the burgeoning gravel bike.

Its adventurous credentials were proven in 2010 as Vin Cox set the Guinness World Record for the fastest circumnavigation of the globe by bicycle.

The Montane Icemen (Pete Sissons and Paul Cosgrove) underlined the bikes capabilities as they used a pair of Croix de Fers to circumnavigate the 1600-mile coastline of Iceland in 14 days.

In 2014, actor Harrison Ford was pictured riding a Croix de Fer in London, while filming for Star Wars: The Force Awakens.

Genesis re-designed the Croix de Fer model in 2024 with a new frame shape and updated specs and graphics. Kerry McPhee wins the Highland Trail 550 on a Genesis Mantle MTB in 2024 and 2026, and placed well in the 2025 race until her bike was washed away in a river crossing.

== Vin Cox ==
The popularity of the Croix de Fer was helped in part by Vin Cox using a Genesis Croix de Fer when claiming the Guinness World Record for the fastest circumnavigation of the globe by bicycle in 2010

== Zero ==
In 2014, Genesis made its first production carbon fibre bike for the Madison Genesis road racing team – the Zero was subsequently updated in September 2015, with a lower weight and improved fork.

The Zero carbon road bike range was expanded in 2017 with the addition of a disc brake model, the Zero Disc, developed alongside the Madison Genesis racing team. The following year, Connor Swift rode the rim-brake Zero SL to a win at the 2018 British National Road Race Championships. To mark the occasion Genesis collaborated with custom paint specialist Doktor Bobby to produce a bespoke commemorative version of the bike.

== Volare ==
Also in 2018, Genesis launched the Volare Disc frameset, a disc brake version of its stainless steel road frameset which won road.cc's Frameset of the Year award for 2018/19.

The Madison Genesis road racing team competed at UCI Continental level until September 2019.

== Genesis Bicycle Club ==
In 2022 Genesis launched the Genesis Bicycle Club (GBC), hosting its first organised ride out in Yorkshire.

== Genesis Bike ranges ==
Road (sportive)

- Equilibrium – steel road bike
- Equilibrium Disc– steel or titanium road bike, disc brake

Adventure & Gravel

- Fugio - steel gravel bike
- Croix de Fer – steel or titanium gravel bike
- CdA – aluminium gravel bike
- Vagabond – chromoly touring gravel bike

E-Bike

- Columbia Road - steel e-bike
- Smithfield - steel e-bike

Touring

- Tour De Fer - steel touring bike with flat and drop bar versions

Youth

- CdA Junior

== Sponsorship ==
Bike supplier and title sponsor to the Madison Genesis road racing team, from 2013 - 2019.
