= Sara Perlman =

American sports television personality

Sara Perlman is an American sports television personality. Perlman is the host of NBC Sports' The Daily Line, discussing entertaining sports topics with a focus on sports betting. She also hosted the Halftime Show on NBC coverage of the United States Football League.

== Early life and career ==
Perlman is from Fort Lauderdale, Florida and attended St. Thomas Aquinas High School, where she played soccer and won state and national championships. She went on to play soccer at American University before transferring and graduating from the University of Florida with a degree in sports journalism and telecommunications. Before working for NBC, MASN employed her as a digital reporter for the Baltimore Orioles.

== Personal life ==
Perlman is married to professional baseball player Trey Mancini; she met him in 2017 when she worked for MASN, covering the Baltimore Orioles, for whom Mancini was playing at the time, and Washington Nationals. The couple began dating after Perlman left MASN for NBC Sports, as host of The Daily Line. Shortly after they started dating, Mancini was diagnosed with colon cancer and she became a caretaker for him. Mancini announced he was cancer-free in November 2020. The couple became engaged in November 2021, and married in December, 2022.
