= Manon Carpenter =

Welsh racing cyclist

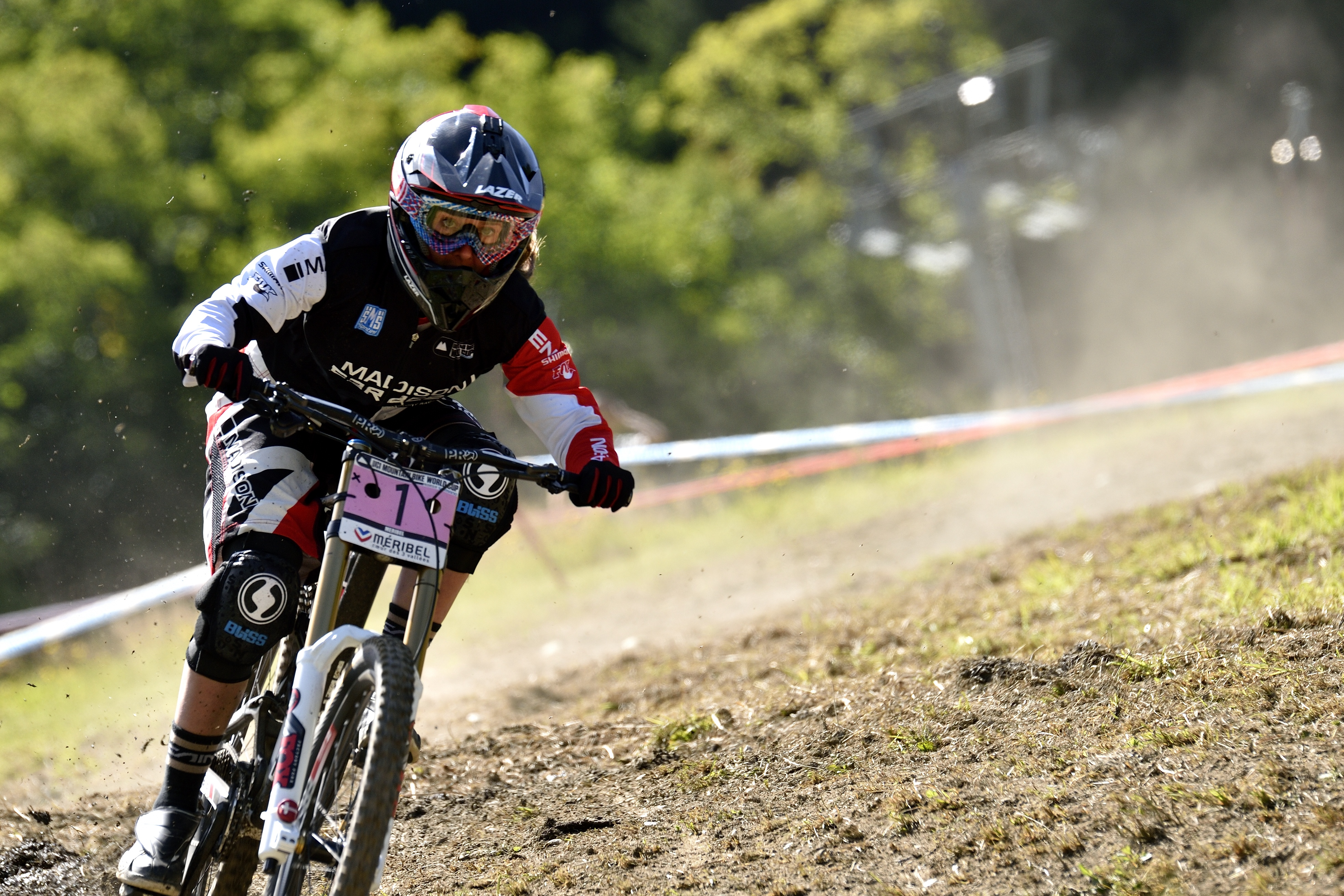

Personal information
- Full name: Manon Rose Carpenter
- Born: 11 March 1993 (age 33) Wales; United Kingdom

Cycling career
- Sport: Cycling
- Current team: Radon Factory DH
- Discipline: MTB
- Role: Rider
- Rider type: DH

Professional team
- 2011–2016: Madison Saracen

Major wins
- (United Kingdom) GBR DH National Champion; UCI DH World Champion Junior; UCI DH World Cup Champion Junior; UCI DH World Champion; UCI DH World Cup Champion
Medal record
Representing Great Britain
Women's Mountain Bike
World Championships
Gold medal – first place	2011 Champerey	Junior downhill
Gold medal – first place	2014 Hafjell	Downhill
Silver medal – second place	2015 Vallnord	Downhill
Bronze medal – third place	2012 Leogang	Downhill

Manon Rose Carpenter (born 11 March 1993) is a Welsh, professional racing cyclist formerly specialising in downhill mountain bike racing.

Carpenter is from Caerphilly, South Wales. She was inspired to take up the sport by her father, Jason, a BMX track builder who also ran a DH race series in South Wales. Carpenter attended St. Martin's Comprehensive School, Caerphilly and is taking a gap year to concentrate on her sport before studying a science and Spanish degree in Manchester.

In 2011, Manon Carpenter won the Junior UCI Downhill World Championship and the Junior UCI Mountain Bike World Cup overall. In 2013, Manon came third in the UCI Mountain Bike World Cup overall. In 2014 Manon took the world cup overall title and completed the season with the world championship at Hafjell earning the rainbow colour jersey.

She became a double world champion in 2014, winning the UCI Mountain Bike World Championship and the UCI World Cup Mountain Bike Downhill Series. She was also named Elite Cyclist of the Year at the USN Welsh Cycling Awards.

In November 2016 she announced that she was leaving Madison Saracen.

In August 2017 Carpenter announced her retirement from Downhill racing with immediate effect.

== Results ==
2011
1st (United Kingdom) DH, Junior British National Mountain Biking Championships
1st DH, UCI Mountain Bike & Trials World Championships Junior, Champéry, France
1st DH, UCI Mountain Bike World Cup, Series Overall Junior

2012
1st (United Kingdom) DH, British National Mountain Biking Championships
2nd DH, UCI Mountain Bike World Cup, Round 1, Pietermaritzburg, South Africa
3rd DH, UCI Mountain Bike & Trials World Championships Elite, Leogang, Austria

2013
2nd DH, UCI Mountain Bike World Cup, Round 1, Fort William, Scotland
3rd DH, UCI Mountain Bike World Cup, Series Overall

2014
1st DH, UCI Mountain Bike World Cup, Round 1, Pietermaritzburg, South Africa
1st DH, UCI Mountain Bike World Cup, Round 4, Leogang, Austria
1st DH, UCI Mountain Bike World Cup, Round 5, Mont-Sainte-Anne, Canada
1st DH, UCI Mountain Bike World Cup, Series Overall
1st DH, UCI Mountain Bike World Championships, Hafjell, Norway

2015
4th DH, UCI Mountain Bike World Cup, Round 1, Lourdes, France
4th DH, UCI Mountain Bike World Cup, Round 2, Fort William, Scotland
DSQ* DH, UCI Mountain Bike World Cup, Round 3, Leogang, Austria
2nd DH, UCI Mountain Bike World Cup, Round 4, Lenzerheide, Switzerland
2nd DH, UCI Mountain Bike World Cup, Round 5, Mont-Sainte-Anne, Canada
2nd DH UCI Mountain Bike World Cup, Round 6, Windham, New York, United States
3rd DH, UCI Mountain Bike World Cup, Round 7, Val di Sole, Italy
2nd DH, UCI Mountain Bike World Cup, Series Overall
2nd DH, UCI Mountain Bike World Championships, Vallnord, Andorra
* Disqualified for leaving track & rejoining further down the track
1st DH, British Downhill Series, Round 1, Ae Forest, Scotland
3rd DH, British Downhill Series, Round 2, Fort William, Scotland
1st DH, British Downhill Series, Round 3, Llangollen, Wales
2nd DH, British Downhill Series, Round 4, Bala, Wales
1st DH, British Downhill Series, Round 5, Moelfre, Wales
1st DH, British Downhill Series, Round 6, Blaenau Ffestiniog, Wales
1st DH, British Downhill Series, Series Overall

2016 - British Downhill Series
1st DH, British Downhill Series, Round 1, Ae Forest, Scotland

2016 - UCI Mountain Bike World Cup
3rd DH, UCI Mountain Bike World Cup, Round 1, Lourdes, France
3rd DH, UCI Mountain Bike World Cup, Round 2, Cairns, Australia
3rd DH, UCI Mountain Bike World Cup, Round 3, Fort William, Scotland
5th DH, UCI Mountain Bike World Cup, Round 4, Leogang, Austria
4th DH, UCI Mountain Bike World Cup, Round 6, Mont-Sainte-Anne, Canada
