= Matt Walker (cyclist) =

British mountain biker

Personal information
- Born: 25 May 1999 (age 27)

Cycling career
- Sport: Cycling
- Discipline: Downhill
- Role: Rider
Medal record
Representing United Kingdom
Mountain bike racing
World Championships
Gold medal – first place	2017 Cairns	Junior downhill
European Championships
Silver medal – second place	2024 Champéry	Downhill

Matt Walker (born 25 May 1999) is a British downhill mountain biker. He won the 2020 UCI Downhill World Cup.

== Major results ==
2016
4th Overall UCI Junior DH World Cup

1st Cairns

2017
1st UCI Junior DH World Championships
3rd Overall UCI Junior DH World Cup

1st Fort William

2018
1st National DH Championships
2020
1st Overall 2020 UCI DH World Cup
