= Josh Lowe =

American baseball player (born 1998)

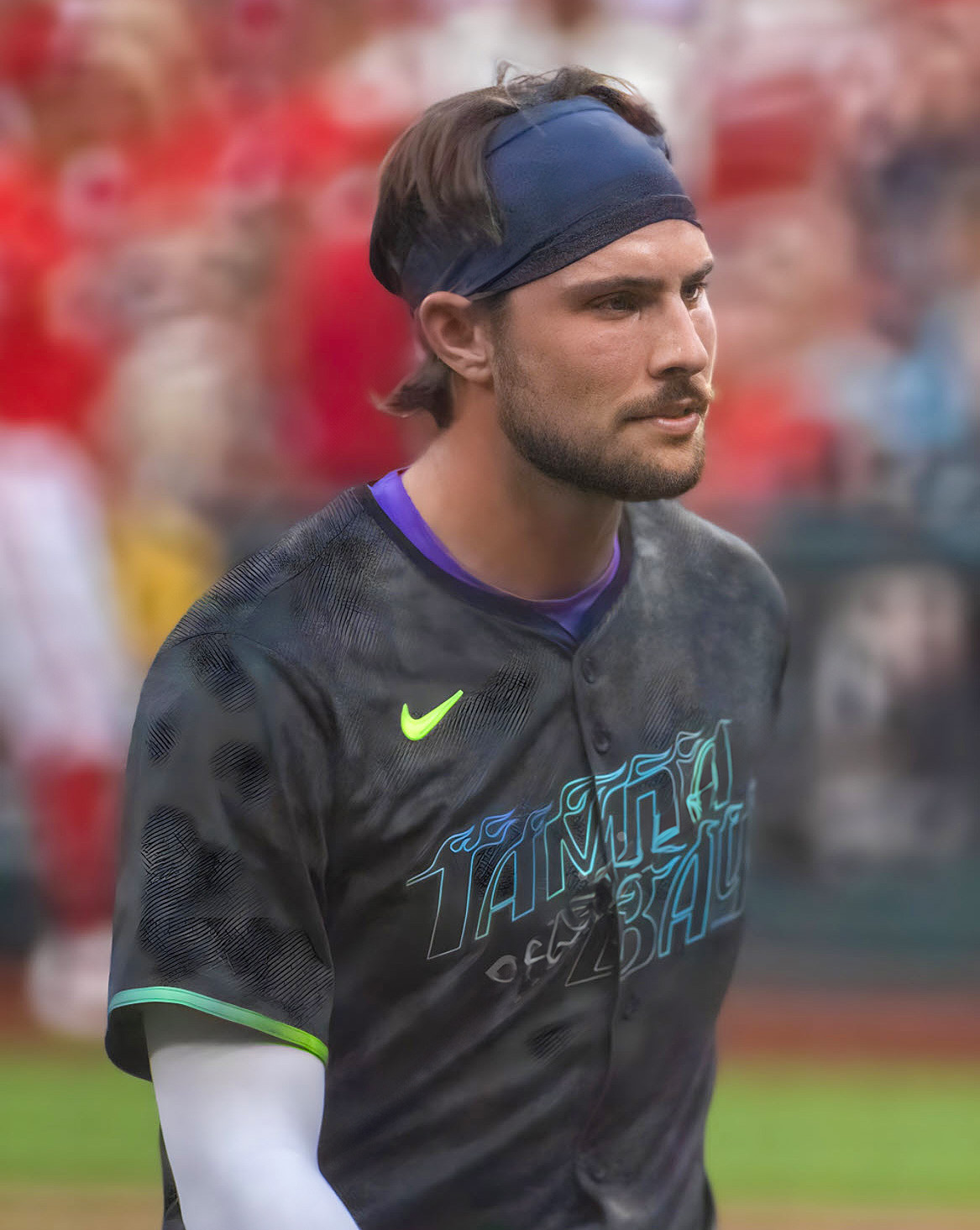
- Lowe with the Tampa Bay Rays in 2024

Los Angeles Angels – No. 3
- Outfielder
- Born: February 2, 1998 (age 28); Marietta, Georgia, U.S.
- Bats: Left Throws: Right

MLB debut
- September 8, 2021, for the Tampa Bay Rays

MLB statistics (through 2026 season)
- Batting average: .242
- Home runs: 55
- Runs batted in: 199
- Stats at Baseball Reference

Teams
- Tampa Bay Rays (2021–2025); Los Angeles Angels (2026–present)

Joshua Edward Lowe (/loʊ/ LOH; born February 2, 1998) is an American professional baseball outfielder for the Los Angeles Angels of Major League Baseball (MLB). He has previously played in MLB for the Tampa Bay Rays, with whom he made his MLB debut in 2021.

== Amateur career ==
Lowe attended Pope High School in Marietta, Georgia. He played third base and was a pitcher. As a senior, he was the Gatorade Baseball Player of the Year for Georgia after hitting .391 with 11 home runs and 39 runs batted in (RBIs). He committed to play college baseball for the Florida State Seminoles.

== Professional career ==
=== Tampa Bay Rays ===
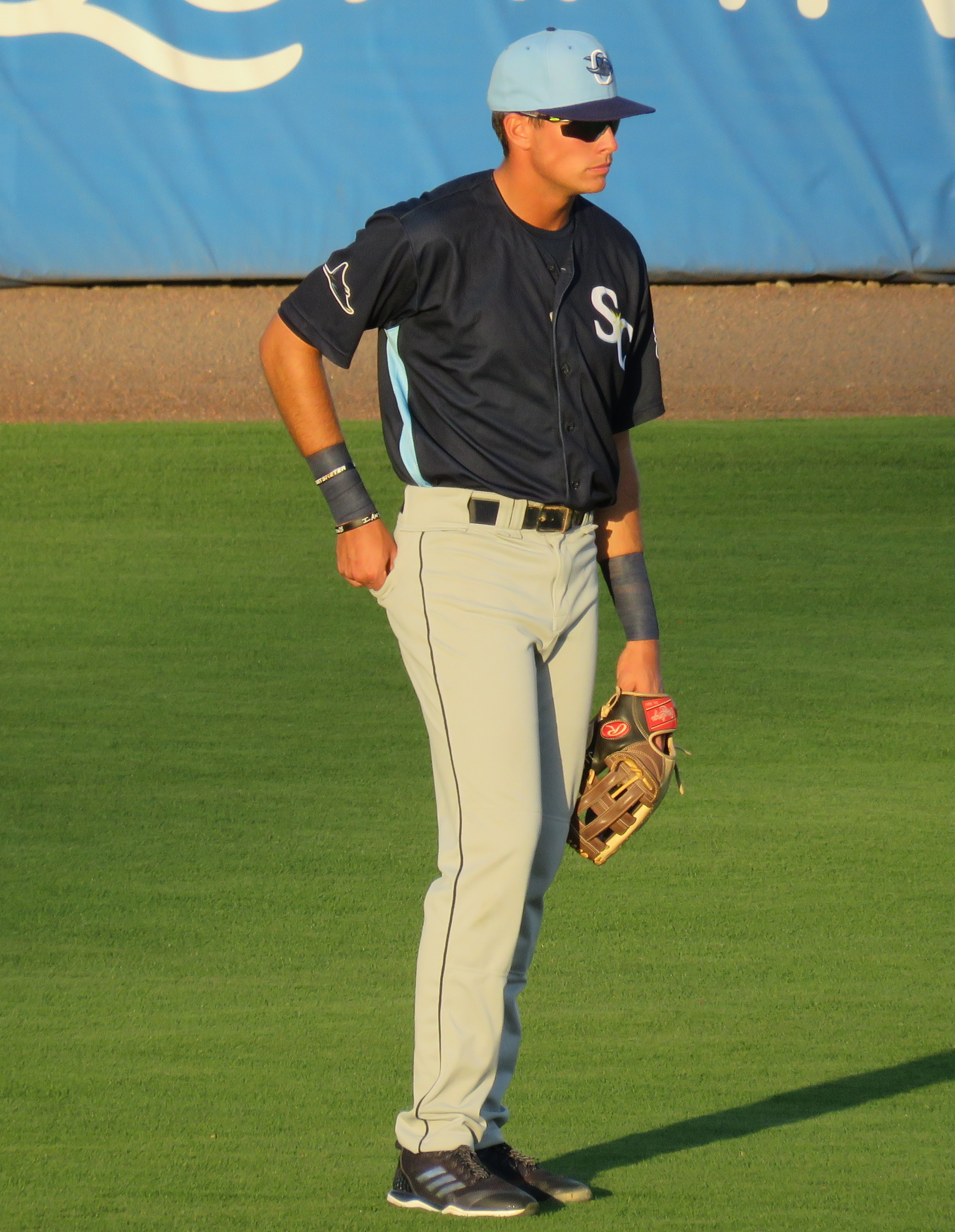
Lowe in the minors

Lowe was selected by the Tampa Bay Rays with the 13th pick in the first round of the 2016 Major League Baseball draft. He signed and spent his first professional season with both the Gulf Coast League Rays and the Princeton Rays where he batted a combined .249 with five home runs and 26 RBIs in 54 total games between both teams. Lowe spent 2017 with the Bowling Green Hot Rods where he batted .268 with eight home runs, 55 RBIs, and 22 stolen bases in 118 games, and he spent 2018 with the Charlotte Stone Crabs where he hit .238 with six home runs, 47 RBIs, and 18 stolen bases in 105 games. Lowe has played exclusively as an outfielder since the start of 2017. He began 2019 with the Montgomery Biscuits. He was selected to play in the Arizona Fall League for the Salt River Rafters following the season.

Lowe in 2024

On November 20, 2020, Lowe was added to the 40-man roster. He was assigned to the Triple-A Durham Bulls to begin the 2021 season. In 111 games for Durham, Lowe slashed .291/.381/.535 with 22 home runs, 78 RBI, and 26 stolen bases. Lowe was called up to the major leagues for the first time on September 8, 2021. In his debut, Lowe had a walk and a stolen base before collecting his first career hit, singling off of Boston Red Sox starter Nathan Eovaldi.

On April 30, 2022, Lowe hit his first career home run off of Dylan Bundy of the Minnesota Twins. He appeared in 52 games for the Rays in 2022, hitting .221/.284/.343 with 2 home runs and 13 RBI. Lowe made 135 appearances for Tampa Bay during the 2023 season, batting .292/.335/.500 with 20 home runs, 83 RBI, and 32 stolen bases.

In 2024, Lowe made 106 appearances for the Rays, slashing .241/.302/.391 with 10 home runs, 34 RBI, and 25 stolen bases. He made 108 appearances for Tampa Bay during the 2025 campaign, batting .220/.283/.366 with 11 home runs, 40 RBI, and 18 stolen bases.

=== Los Angeles Angels ===
On January 16, 2026, the Rays sent Lowe to the Los Angeles Angels in a three-team trade in which the Angels sent Brock Burke to the Cincinnati Reds and the Reds sent Gavin Lux to the Rays. On May 22, Lowe was demoted to the Angels' Triple-A affiliate Salt Lake Bees. He was called back up to the major league team on June 24.

== Personal life ==
His brother, Nathaniel Lowe, plays in MLB. The two were teammates in Bowling Green before Nathaniel was promoted to the High-A Charlotte Stone Crabs. His father, David, was drafted by the Seattle Mariners in the 1986 MLB draft, but instead attended the U.S. Naval Academy and became a Naval Aviator and career fighter pilot in the U.S. Navy.

He is not related to his former Rays teammate Brandon Lowe (/laʊ/ LAU), who was drafted a year earlier.
