= Malcolm Elliott =

English cyclist (born 1961)

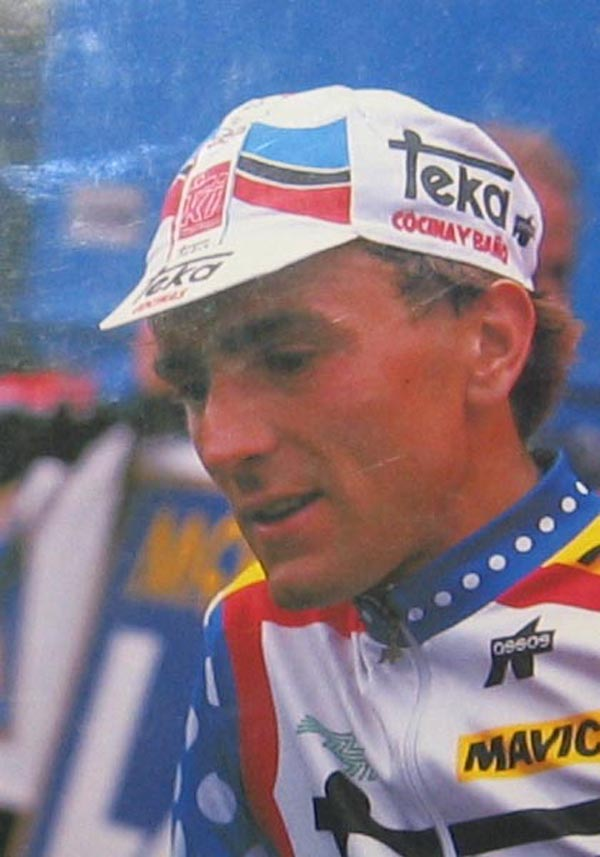
- Elliott at the 1989 Tour of Britain in his Teka team colours

Personal information
- Born: 1 July 1961 (age 65) Sheffield, England

Cycling career
- Sport: Cycling
- Discipline: Road
- Role: Rider (retired); Sporting director
- Rider type: Sprinter

Amateur teams
- Rutland CC
- Manchester Wheelers' Club

Professional teams
- 1984–1985: Raleigh–Weinmann
- 1986–1987: ANC–Halfords
- 1988: Fagor
- 1989–1990: Teka
- 1991–1992: Seur–Otero
- 1993–1996: Chevrolet–LA Sheriffs
- 1997: Comptel–Colorado Cyclist
- 2003–2005: Pinarello–Assos
- 2006: Plowman Craven
- 2007–2008: Pinarello Racing Team
- 2009–2011: CandiTV–Marshalls Pasta

Managerial team
- Velosure–Giordana

Major wins
- Grand Tours Vuelta a España Points classification (1989) 3 individual stages (1988, 1989) Stage races Tour of Britain (1988) One-day races and Classics National Road Race Championships (1993)
Medal record
Representing England
Men's road bicycle racing
Commonwealth Games
Gold medal – first place	Brisbane 1982	Individual Road Race
Gold medal – first place	Brisbane 1982	Team Time Trial

Malcolm Elliott (born 1 July 1961) is a former English professional cyclist, whose professional career has lasted from 1984 to 1997 when he retired and from 2003 up to 2011 when he made his comeback in British domestic racing.

Known as a sprinter, his career includes three stages and the points classification in the Vuelta a España, two gold medals in the Commonwealth Games, and winning the amateur Milk Race and its professional version, the Kellogg's Tour. He rode and finished the Tour de France in 1987 and 1988. Elliott also competed at the Olympic Games in 1980 and 1996.

== Early life and amateur career ==
Elliott was brought up in the Wadsley area of Sheffield. He joined Rutland Cycling Club in Sheffield at 15 where he was selected for the British team for the world junior championship in Argentina in 1979. In 1980 riding for Rutland CC, Elliott won the Monsal Hill Climb and the British National Hill Climb Championships, beating Jeff Williams by one fifth of a second. He also raced for the UV Aube cycling club in Troyes, France, for part of 1980 season to gain experience of racing on the continent before being selected for the British team pursuit at the 1980 Summer Olympics in Moscow. He, Sean Yates and Tony Doyle finished seventh. The following year Elliott, would return to Monsal Hill Climb, again taking the win but also beating the existing 1957 record set by Tom Simpson, improving the time from 1m 23.4s to 1m 14.2s. The record stands to this day and is considered the longest standing record in British Hill Climbing history.

Elliott's breakthrough came at the 1982 Commonwealth Games in Brisbane where he first took gold in the team time trial and then again in the 184 kilometre road race by outsprinting Steve Bauer, Roger Sumich, Steve Lawrence and Russell Harrington.

1983 was Elliott's final year as an amateur and he took six stages of the Milk Race and was also third overall in the Circuit des Ardennes before turning professional with Raleigh–Weinmann in 1984. Further domestic success followed in 1984 and 1985 before switching to the ANC–Halfords Cycling Team for the 1987 season, alongside Graham Jones, Paul Watson and Joey McLoughlin.

== Professional career ==
ANC–Halfords raced on the continent as well as in Britain. Elliott finished third in the 1987 Amstel Gold Race. The team received an invitation to the 1987 Tour de France with Elliott finishing 94th overall and third on the stage into Bordeaux.

In 1988 Elliott joined the Fagor team, led by Stephen Roche. Elliott took his first stage in the Vuelta a España that year and another two in 1989, by which time he had switched to the Spanish Teka team riding alongside fellow British rider Darryl Webster. He rode in Europe until the end of 1992 when he signed for the American team, Chevrolet–LA Sheriffs, winning the British National Road Race Championships, that year.

Elliott had many wins for Chevrolet, winning the First Union Grand Prix in 1993 and 1994 and the Redlands Classic in 1993 and 1994, and two stage wins in the Tour DuPont in 1993 and 1995. In 1996 he was then selected for the Olympic Games road race, but finished a disappointing seventy ninth. The race was won by Pascal Richard. In 1997 he moved to Comptel–Colorado Cyclist but the team hit financial trouble. That led Elliott to retire at the end of 1997 aged 36.

=== Comeback ===
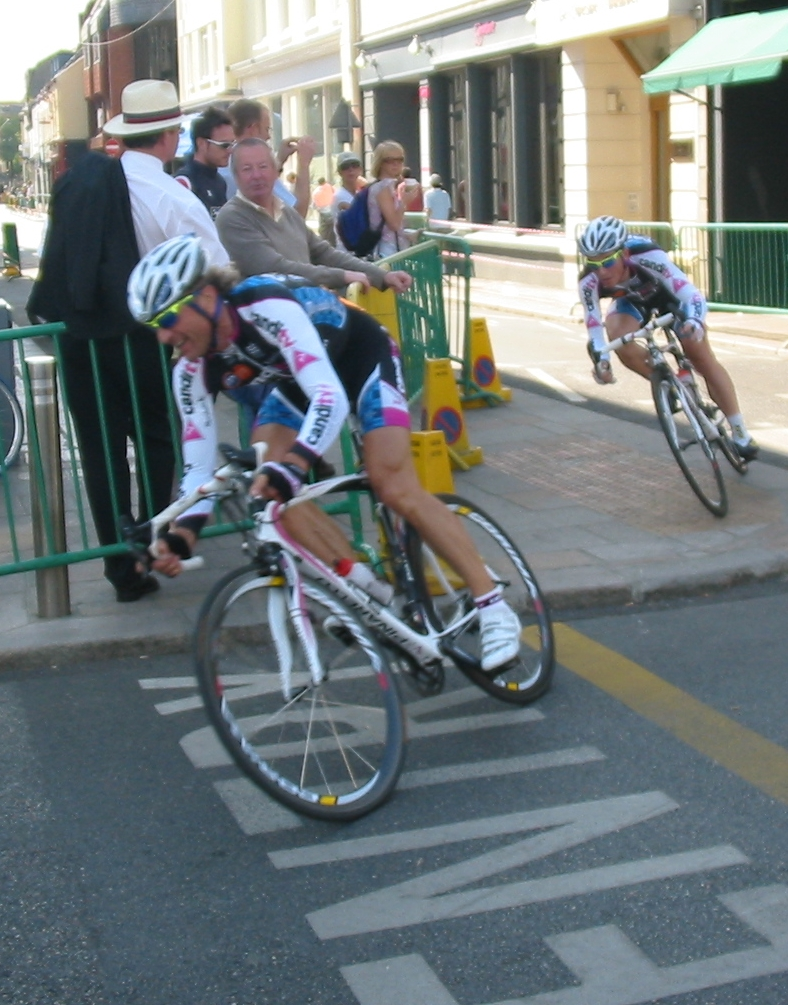
Elliott in the Jersey Town Criterium 2009 in St Helier

Elliott returned at the start of 2003 at 41. Riding as an individual for the Pinarello-Assos squad (set up by his former manager at ANC–Halfords, Phil Griffiths), he won in the Havant International GP and stages in the Irish Milk Ras. In 2004, he won the season long Premier Calendar, and the National Elite Circuit Series. For 2006 Elliott signed for Plowman Craven team and again won the National Elite Circuit Series. On 24 August 2006 in St. Johann, Austria, he became UCI road masters world champion.

In 2007 he won the UCI 1.2 ranked International CiCle Classic, and the Shay Elliott Memorial, the Irish one-day classic.

In 2009 he was inducted into the British Cycling Hall of Fame.

For the 2010 season, Elliott raced with the newly launched Motorpoint Pro-Cycling Team. The ten-strong team, based in Stone in Staffordshire, saw Elliott managed by Keith Lambert and the team run by Phil Griffiths. The team competed in such high-profile races as the Tour of Britain and 'UK Tour Series' – the city centre-based cycling race series broadcast on TV, in which Elliott won the Durham round and the Motorpoint team took overall honours. On 16 May 2010 he set the record for completing the Etape du Dales sportive in 5 hours and 43 minutes. He left the roster after the 2011 season, but remained with the team as a sporting director.

== Doping ==
In 1992 Elliott failed a dope test on stages 3 and 5 of the Tour of Andalucia, testing positive for nandrolone, an anabolic steroid. As the two tests were so close this was treated as a single infraction and he was stripped of the win on stage 3.

== Major results ==
1979
3rd National Junior Road Race Series
1980
1st National Hill Climb Championships
1981
2nd National Hill Climb Championships
1982
Commonwealth Games

1st Road race
1st Team time trial

3rd Overall Sealink International Grand Prix
1983
1st Premier Calendar
1st Lincoln Grand Prix
1st Tour of the Peak
3rd Overall Circuit des Ardennes
3rd Milk Race

1st Six stages

1984
1st National Criterium Championships
1st Sealink International Grand Prix
10th Overall Milk Race
1985
1st Individual pursuit, National Track Championships
13th Milk Race
1st Overall Herald Sun Tour

1st Stages 1, 2, 12 & 16

1986
2nd Overall Milk Race

1st Two stages

3rd Overall Herald Sun Tour

1st Stages 6 & 16

1987
1st Overall Milk Race

1st Five stages

Nissan Classic

1st Stages 1, 4b & 5

1st Stage 4 Herald Sun Tour
3rd Amstel Gold Race
1988
1st Overall Tour of Britain

1st Prologue & Stage 1

1st Stage 17 Vuelta a España
1st Stage 3 Vuelta a Aragón
1st Stage 13 Herald Sun Tour
2nd Overall Nissan Classic
1989
Vuelta a España

1st Points classification
1st Stages 3b & 11

Setmana Catalana de Ciclisme

1st Prologue & Stages 1 & 5

Vuelta a Castilla y León

1st Stages 3 & 5

1st Prologue Tour of Britain
1st Stage 2 Tour of Galicia
1st Stage 4 Vuelta a Burgos
2nd Tour of the Americas
1990
1st Overall Milk Race
Volta a Catalunya

1st Stages 1 & 3

Vuelta a Cantabria

1st Stage 1 & 4a

1st Stage 1 Tour of the Basque Country
1st Stage 1 Tour of Britain
1991
1st Trofeo Masferrer
Troféu Joaquim Agostinho

1st Stages 3a & 6

6th Overall Tour Méditerranéen
1992
1st Stage 4 Vuelta a los Valles Mineros
1st Stage 5 Volta ao Alentejo
2nd Overall Vuelta a Castilla y León
3rd Clásica de Sabiñánigo
6th Trofeo Masferrer
1993
1st Road race, National Road Championships
1st Overall Redlands Classic

1st Stage

1st Overall Tour of Bisbee

1st Stage

1st Stage 6 Tour DuPont
1st First Union Grand Prix
1994
1st Overall Redlands Classic
Killington Stage Race

1st Two stages

1st First Union Grand Prix
1995
Killington Stage Race

1st Two stages

1st Stage 1 Tour DuPont
1st Stage Tour de Toona
1996
1st Killington Stage Race
1st Manhattan Beach GP
1997
1st Jackson Criterium
2003
1st Havant International GP
3rd Premier Calendar
2004
1st Premier Calendar
Girvan 3-Day

1st 2 stages

5th Overall Rás Tailteann

1st Stages 5 & 8

2005
1st Beaumont Trophy
2nd Overall Rás Tailteann

1st Points classification
1st Stage 4

2006
1st UCI road masters world champion
1st British Elite Circuit Series Champion
2007
1st Shay Elliott Memorial Race
1st East Midlands International Cicle Classic
1st Newport Nocturne
2008
1st Circuit de Stone
3rd East Midlands International Cicle Classic
5th Rogaland Grand Prix
5th Grand Prix of Wales

== Bibliography ==
- Sprinter, Malcolm Elliott with Jeff Connor, ISBN 0-7207-1939-9
