= 1987 Tour of Britain =

Race details
- Dates: 12–16 August 1987
- Stages: 5
- Winning time: 26h 44' 21"

Results
	Winner	Joey McLoughlin (GBR)	(ANC–Halfords)
	Second	Steven Rooks (NED)	(PDM–Ultima–Concorde)
	Third	Sergio Finazzi (ITA)	(Remac–Fanini)
	Points	Michel Vermote (BEL)	(RMO–Cycles Méral–Mavic)
	Mountains	Denis Roux (FRA)	(Vétements Z–Peugeot)
	Sprints	Chris Walker (GBR)	(Watertech–Dawes)
	Team	ANC–Halfords	

The 1987 Tour of Britain was the inaugural edition of the Kellogg's Tour of Britain cycle race and was held from 12 August to 16 August 1987. The race started in Edinburgh and finished in London. The race was won by Joey McLoughlin of the ANC–Halfords team.

== Route ==
Stage characteristics and winners
Stage	Date	Course	Distance	Type	Winner
1	12 August	Edinburgh to Newcastle	188 km (116.8 mi)		Allan Peiper (AUS)
2	13 August	Newcastle to Manchester	276 km (171.5 mi)		Joey McLoughlin (GBR)
3	14 August	Manchester to Birmingham	188 km (116.8 mi)		Steve Joughin (GBR)
4	15 August	Birmingham to Cardiff	246 km (152.9 mi)		Paul Haghedooren (BEL)
5	16 August	Westminster criterium	97 km (60.3 mi)	Flat stage	Michel Vermote (BEL)

== General classification ==
Final general classification

Rank	Rider	Team	Time
1	Joey McLoughlin (GBR)	ANC–Halfords	26h 44' 21"
2	Steven Rooks (NED)	PDM–Ultima–Concorde	+ 5"
3	Sergio Finazzi (ITA)	Remac–Fanini	+ 9"
4	Philippe Chevalier (FRA)	Toshiba–Look	+ 11"
5	Denis Roux (FRA)	Vétements Z–Peugeot	+ 17"
6	Michel Vermote (BEL)	RMO–Cycles Méral–Mavic	+ 3' 05"
7	Bob Roll (USA)	7-Eleven	+ 3' 26"
8	Paul Haghedooren (BEL)	Sigma–Fina	+ 3' 28"
9	Phil Thomas (GBR)	Raleigh–Banana	+ 3' 35"
10	Allan Peiper (AUS)	Panasonic–Isostar	+ 3' 36"
