= 1988 Tour of Britain =

Race details
- Dates: 9–14 August 1988
- Stages: 6 + Prologue
- Winning time: 30h 35' 37"

Results
	Winner	Malcolm Elliott (GBR)	(Fagor–MBK)
	Second	Joey McLoughlin (GBR)	(Z–Peugeot)
	Third	Sean Kelly (IRL)	(Kas–Canal 10)
	Points	Joey McLoughlin (GBR)	(Z–Peugeot)
	Mountains	Mauro Gianetti (SUI)	(Weinmann–La Suisse–SMM Uster)

The 1988 Tour of Britain was the second edition of the Kellogg's Tour of Britain cycle race and was held from 9 August to 14 August 1988. The race started in Newcastle and finished in London. The race was won by Malcolm Elliott of the Fagor team.

== Route ==
Stage characteristics and winners
Stage	Date	Course	Distance	Type	Winner
P	9 August	Newcastle upon Tyne	2.7 km (1.7 mi)	Individual time trial	Malcolm Elliott (GBR)
1	10 August	Newcastle to York	191 km (118.7 mi)		Malcolm Elliott (GBR)
2	11 August	York to Manchester	170 km (105.6 mi)		Joey McLaughlin (GBR)
3	12 August	Manchester to Liverpool	188 km (116.8 mi)		Serge Demierre (SUI)
4a	13 August	Liverpool to Stoke-on-Trent	104 km (64.6 mi)		Pol Verschuere (BEL)
4b	13 August	Stoke to Birmingham	82 km (51.0 mi)		Jos Lammerts (NED)
5	14 August	Birmingham to Bristol	243 km (151.0 mi)		Thomas Wegmüller (SUI)
6	14 August	Westminster criterium	100 km (62.1 mi)	Flat stage	Jacques Hanegraaf (NED)

== General classification ==
Final general classification

Rank	Rider	Team	Time
1	Malcolm Elliott (GBR)	Fagor–MBK	30h 35' 37"
2	Joey McLoughlin (GBR)	Z–Peugeot	+ 18"
3	Sean Kelly (IRL)	Kas–Canal 10	+ 34"
4	Sean Yates (GBR)	Fagor–MBK	+ 35"
5	Thomas Wegmüller (SUI)	Kas–Canal 10	+ 37"
6	Stephen Roche (IRL)	Fagor–MBK	+ 46"
7	Frank Hoste (BEL)	AD Renting–Mini-Flat–Enerday	+ 50"
8	Darryl Webster (GBR)	PMS–Dawes	+ 53"
9	Frédéric Vichot (FRA)	Weinmann–La Suisse–SMM Uster	+ 55"
10	Stephen Hodge (AUS)	Kas–Canal 10	+ 56"
