= Graham Jones (cyclist) =

English cyclist

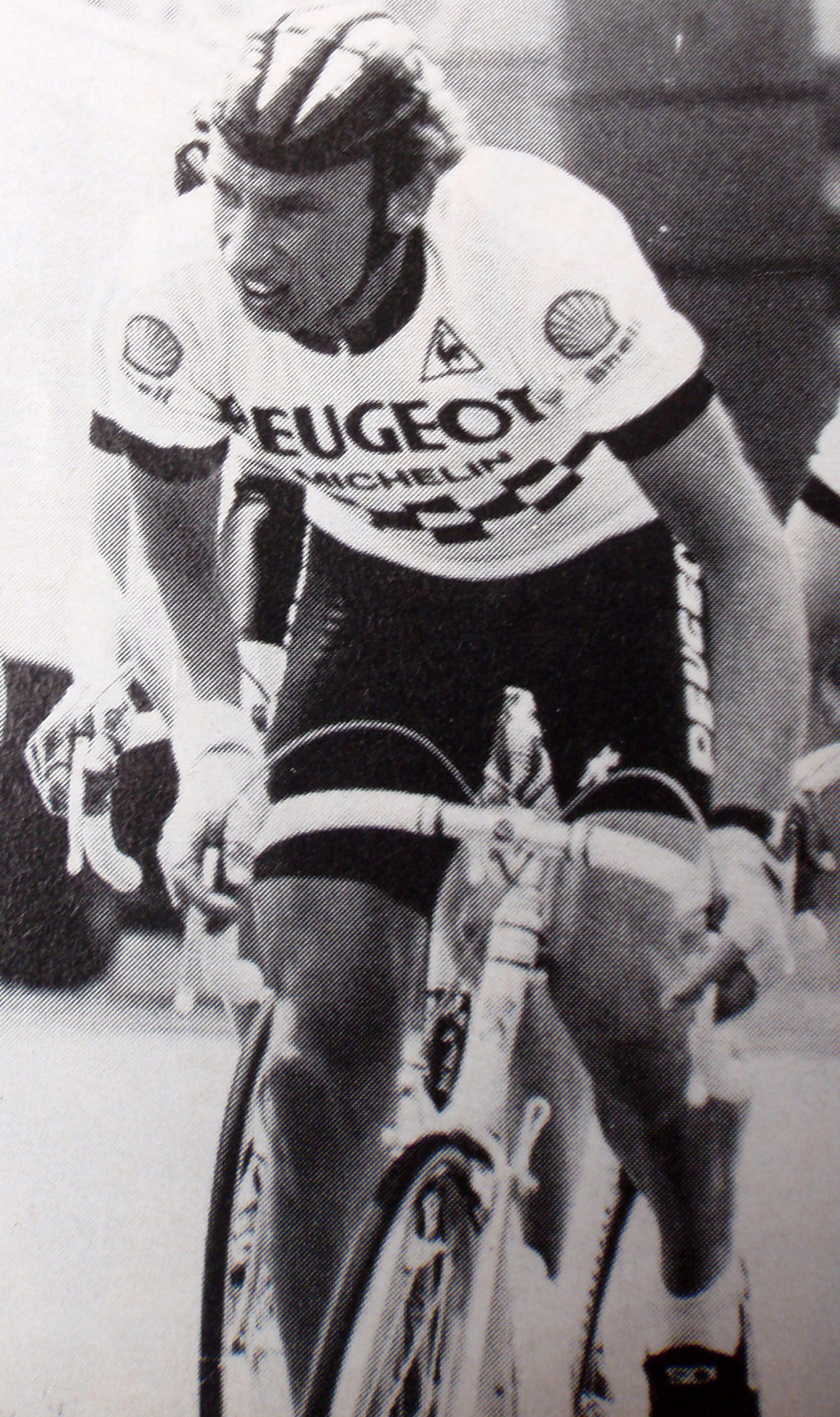
- Jones riding for Peugeot in 1982

Personal information
- Born: 28 October 1957 (age 68) Cheadle, Greater Manchester, England

Cycling career
- Sport: Cycling
- Discipline: Road
- Role: Rider
- Rider type: Climber

Amateur teams
- 1972-7: Abbotsford Park RC
- 1978: ACBB

Professional teams
- 1979–1982: Peugeot
- 1983: Wolber
- 1984: System-U
- 1985: Ever Ready
- 1986–1987: ANC-Halfords
- 1988: Emmelle-MBK

Major wins
- Palme d'Or Merlin Plage

Graham Jones (born 28 October 1957) is a former professional English road racing cyclist from Manchester, England. He rode in the Tour de France and Giro d'Italia. He is often described as one of the classiest riders that Britain has ever produced, but his career was hindered by being over raced in his early days, and by injury in his later days. He is one of the few English-speaking riders to have stood on the podium of the Flanders Classics Het Volk.

== Origins ==
Graham was born in Cheadle, just south of Manchester. As a youth he was on the books of Manchester United F.C. as a part of their youth program. Graham gave up football in favour of cycling. He took his first step towards becoming a professional cyclist in 1972, age 14 he joined the Abbotsford Park Road cycling club which then had a clubroom in Fallowfield, Manchester. During his first year of racing he had no success and was even lapped frequently during the circuit races. It was not until 1974 at 16 years of age he won his first race in Macclesfield. He was coached by Malcolm Firth, who, along with Harold "H" Nelson, developed a training routine based on heart rates and power training. In 1975, as a Junior, he gained three fourth places in national championships (pursuit, road race and 25-mile time-trial) – indeed, the 40 km/25-mile time trial was his first race over the distance for two years and covered the distance in a little over 57 minutes. As well as winning the divisional junior road title, he won the senior pursuit title against the established senior rider, Malcolm Fraser. In his last year as a junior he had 12 wins and also finished 22nd in the World Junior Road Race Championship. In 1976 he went to the Netherlands for five months: his best place was 2nd and he had a host of top six places.

== Amateur career ==
In 1977 he won the UK's first classic of the season – the GP of Essex. He then moved to Belgium, along with the Liverpool rider Nigel Hartle. He won at Anvaing. His form saw him selected for the Peace Race, his first international stage race. The season ended with him being selected to ride in the Etoile Des Espiors (Stars of the future) race in France. He raced against both amateurs and professional riders including Bernard Hinault, yet proved he could hold his own against anyone, finishing third in a stage. In 1978 he moved to France to ride for the notable amateur team ACBB (Athletic Club de Boulogne Billencourt), Europe's most successful sports club, following in the footsteps of his friend and training partner Paul Sherwen. He rode in about 65 races, winning 15 of them including the Grand Prix de Nations, Paris-Évreux and the GP de France. International selection included the five-day Sealink International: he won the prologue in his native Manchester. His success in France saw him win the season long Merlin Plage Palme d'Or as the top amateur in France, and this led to him being offered a professional contract with Peugeot.

== Professional career ==
Graham was one of four new signings among the twenty two riders in the Peugeot team of 1979 which included Bernard Thévenet and Hennie Kuiper. In his first Professional race the Grand Prix St Raphael, he finished in second place behind Roger Rogiers. A few weeks later, on stage 4 of the Paris Nice he was a part of an elite breakaway which tore the race apart. His undoubted class, however, wasn't allowed to flourish as it might, as he was over-raced by his team. Over the coming seasons, his ability against the watch, in the mountains and as a rouleur won him the respect of the peloton.

Throughout his professional career Graham competed in the majority of prestigious races from the Tour de France to Paris–Roubaix. However a combination of his loyalty to the team and bad luck restricted his palmares, as he was often used as a domestique to assist French riders who were behind him overall on general classification. His biggest disappointment was during the 1981 Critérium International, he had dropped Bernard Hinault but on the penultimate descent was knocked off by a press motor cycle. His 1982 season started badly: a training crash caused by ice, whilst out in Cheshire, led to a broken femur and this impacted massively on the season ahead. However, in 1982 he still managed arguably his greatest performance finishing second in the Flanders Classics Het Volk. He caught and dropped the breakaway group that included Sean Kelly and Roger De Vlaeminck. However he did not manage to catch the eventual winner Alfons De Wolf, finishing 26 seconds behind. In 1985 he returned home to Britain, riding with John Herety in the British-based professional Ever Ready /Marlboro team. One year later, Graham moved to the British ANC-Halfords team, riding alongside Joey McLoughlin, Paul Watson and Malcolm Elliott. ANC-Halfords were managed by Phil Griffiths and became a surprise inclusion in the 1987 Tour de France. The team suffered from a shortage of funding, and riders not knowing how to work as a team in a major Tour: as the grandee of the team, Graham tried to bring a professional approach to both the management and the riders Unfortunately, Graham was too exhausted to finish his final Tour. He then had a few rides the following season for Emmelle-MBK riding alongside Mark Bell. However his full-time career as a professional rider effectively ended with ANC-Halfords.

"It is very satisfying to drop Hinault"

— Jones

== Post-cycling career ==
Since his retirement from the peloton, Graham has worked for a bike company (Emmelle) and still works as a commentator for the BBC, Eurosport and ITV. He's a regular on the Tour de France, and gets to meet up with the former riders of the peloton, notably Jean-René Bernaudeau, his former teammate and good friend.

== Major results ==
1976
5th Criterium des Vainqueurs
1977
1st GP of Essex
1st Mike Tyzack Memorial
1st Circuit of Ashurst
1st Tielt Criterium
1st Anvaing criterium
6th Scottish Milk Race
38th World Road Race Championship
40th Peace Race (6th on stage 9)
1978
1st Prologue Time Trial, Sealink International
1st GP de Toulon
1st Paris-Evreux
1st Paris–Troyes
1st GP de St Maxime
1st Paris-Vierzon
1st GP de France
1st GP de Nations
1st Palme d'Or Merlin Plage
2nd Tour de Haut Var
2nd Paris – Ezy
1979
2nd GP St Raphael
7th GP Pino Cerami
18th Amstel Gold Race
35th Flèche Wallonne
1980
11th Giro di Lombardia
26th Paris–Tours
38th Paris–Brussels
49th Tour de France
1981
2nd Tour du Mediterranean
2nd Classique Saint-Sebastien
(United Kingdom) 3rd British National Road Race Championships
3rd Subida a Arrate (Spanish hill climb)
5th Tour du Haut Var
20th Tour de France
25th Flèche Wallonne
28th Gent–Wevelgem
36th Milan–San Remo
53rd Amstel Gold Race
1982
1st Tour of Delyn
1st Woolmark GP
2nd Het Volk
7th Tour du Mediterranean
51st Gent–Wevelgem
53rd World Road Race Championships
1983
26th Giro d'Italia
69th Tour de France
1984
DNF Tour de France
1985
2nd Hull
2nd Milton Keynes
1986
10th Overall, Milk Race

3rd Stage 2, Milk Race
2nd Stage 5, Milk Race

1987
DNF Tour de France

== Sources ==
- Tony Lyons site
- The Graham Jones Story
- Tour de France stats
