= Les West =

English racing cyclist

Personal information
- Full name: Leslie West
- Nickname: Grisby Welch
- Born: 11 November 1943 (age 82) Hanley, Stoke-on-Trent, England

Cycling career
- Sport: Cycling
- Discipline: Road
- Role: Rider

Amateur team
- 1959: Tunstall Wheelers

Professional team
- 1969-1978: Holdsworth

Major wins
- 1960 - North Staffs 25-mile time-trial champion; 1961 - North Staffs 10, 25, 30 and 50 mile champion; 1961 - North Staffs track league champion; 1961 - North Staffs five-mile pursuit champion; 1961 - North Staffs 4,000m pursuit champion; 1963 - Isle of Man Time trial; 1964 - Isle of Man Mountain Time Trial; 1964 - Isle of Man International Road Race; 1964 - Isle of Man 50 Mile Time Trial; 1965 - Milk Race, Overall and points.; 1965 - Set British hour record; 1965 - set 25-mile time-trial record; 1965 - Tour of the Cotswolds; 1965 - British National Road Championship; 1966 - Isle of Man Mountain Time Trial; 1966 - Isle of Man International Road Race; 1967 - Milk Race; 1968 - Tour of the Isle of Wight; 1969 - 5 professional wins, 9 second places; 1970 - National Road Race Pro champion; 1970 - London-Brighton-London record; 1971 - London-Portsmouth-London record; 1972 -London-Bath-London record; 1975 - National Road Race Champion for professionals; 1976 - Tour of the Peaks; 2003 - National masters champion; 2006 - League of Veteran Racing Cyclists, Champion

Les West (born 11 November 1943) was one of the dominant figures of amateur and professional cycling in Britain during the 1960 and 1970s. He won the Milk Race twice, came second in the world amateur road race championship and fourth in the world professional championship.

== Early career ==
Born in Hanley, Stoke-on-Trent, Staffordshire, England, West's first ride was to Danebridge, when he was 15. He went with his uncle. The following year he joined the Tunstall Wheelers, a club in the Stoke-on-Trent conglomeration of towns in Staffordshire. He won the North Staffordshire 25-mile time-trial championship when he was 16. He beat one hour for 25 miles in 1961 and won North Staffordshire championships at 10, 25, 30 and 50 miles, won the area track league and became five-mile and 4,000m pursuit champion. His first international selection was for the Olympia's Tour, the amateur tour of the Netherlands, in 1964. He was unplaced.

== International amateur ==
West rode the Milk Race, the Tour of Britain for the first time in 1965, riding as a late selection for the Midlands. His local bike shop owner jokingly promised him a free bike if he won. West said: "I remember seeing my first Milk Race in Chester. I was about 16. It impressed me. And never did I imagine that I'd ride. My first one was in 1965 and I won it. Circumstances!" He won the points competition as well but he won overall, he says, only because several riders, including a leading Spaniard, were thrown out in the race's first positive dope tests. (Note: Luis Santamarina won the stage of the 1965 Tour of Britain which started at Scarborough and crossed Rosedale Chimney. He rode away from the race on one of the race's hardest climbs before colliding with the back of a car parked beside the road as an official waited to time him. He remounted and won the stage and led the race. Two days later he and three others were disqualified for doping, and the Spanish team went home.) West's prizes for winning were a gold watch and a combined radiogram and cocktail cabinet.

That year he beat the national hour record, set a 25-mile time-trial record, won the Tour of the Cotswolds next day, won the national road championship and came second in the Isle of Man International.

In 1966 West lived in the Netherlands, riding round-the-houses races. He said: "Fantastic, that was. Very, very fast." He rode Olympia's Tour, the amateur tour of the Netherlands, which he said averaged 29 mph. "But Holland left me legless for the climbs on the Milk Race" and he came sixth. "To me, that was nothing", he said.

That autumn he finished second to Evert Dolman of the Netherlands in the world championship on the Nürburgring circuit in Germany. The two had slipped clear of the field but West cramped in the sprint. He has refused to speak further of Dolman, going little further than saying "Well, he didn't ride exactly clean. At the end he told me so. Let's just say things were not right." Keith Bingham, writing in Cycling Weekly went further when he spoke of a rider so ill through the drugs he had taken that he no longer recognised journalists he had known for years. The description approaches Dolman, who was caught for doping as a professional. Dolman said "I couldn't win races without that stuff, that was obvious."

West said an official from the British Cycling Federation approached him after the championship and said: "Good ride, son. What's your name?" West was to have joined Jacques Anquetil's Bic team, at the recommendation of British professional Vin Denson, but his contract did not arrive and he stayed in Britain.

West won the Milk Race again in 1967, in what Keith Bingham of Cycling Weekly described as "astonishing style."

== Professional ==
Les West said
I mean, you never earned a fortune [as an amateur]. But I bet my earnings and winnings were equivalent to the pros of that day. I really turned pro for the competition. For a change. I could have joined other teams for a lot more money and I never did. I was faithful to Roy [Thame of Holdsworth Cycles]. Great chap, Roy is. Nice bloke. But I got too friendly with him. I suppose money isn't everything. When you talk of money, I suppose you are talking about £1,000 extra Well, your friendship over the years is worth more than that, isn't it?

— Cycling Weekly, UK, 12 October 1992

Professional racing had developed in Britain but West held on for the Olympic Games in Mexico in 1968. He punctured early, waited for the mechanics in the service car behind the last rider, changed bikes twice, chased for 30 miles and gave up. He turned professional for the Holdsworth team, managed by a shopkeeper called Roy Thame in west London. It paid no more than he had been winning as an amateur, he said, but there were compensations.

His first win was the Tour of the Isle of Wight, held over three days at Easter. "That's my first pro win and probably my last", he said. He had four more wins and came second nine times.

His best international performance was fourth in the world championship in 1970, held in Leicester, England. West got into the winning break with Jempi Monseré of Belgium, Leif Mortensen and the Italian Felice Gimondi. Monseré won and West came fourth, troubled once more by cramp in the sprint. West won the British championship, broke the London-Portsmouth, London-Bath-London records, won the Tour of the Peaks and then in 1978 retired as a professional.

The rule was that professionals had to have a season out of racing before the British Cycling Federation would consider a return to the amateur. West said: "The BCF punished you.... You'd be surprised by how much form and interest you lost. If you'd turned professional it was like you had a disease in them days. So that was it, such is life." He regretted that amateurs and professionals had not been allowed to ride together. He said: "A few years after I'd packed up racing, they let the pros ride the Milk Race, which could never have happened in the 1970s. It seemed like my generation were punished in that way, and it's a shame because it would have been good all round if we could have ridden it."

He started racing again, as an amateur, in 1980, rode for two years, then retired.

== Veteran cycling ==
West returned to cycling in the veteran class, and remarked on the fact that he was remembered by older neighbours in Stoke-on-Trent but not by others. In 2003 he dominated the national masters' championship in Warwickshire In September 2006, West became national champion of the League of Veteran Racing Cyclists and rode for GS Strada-Afford Rent-a-Car-Pinarello team which is sponsored by Phil Griffiths. He was 64.

== Honours ==
In 2009, he was inducted into the British Cycling Hall of Fame.
