= Sean Yates =

British cyclist

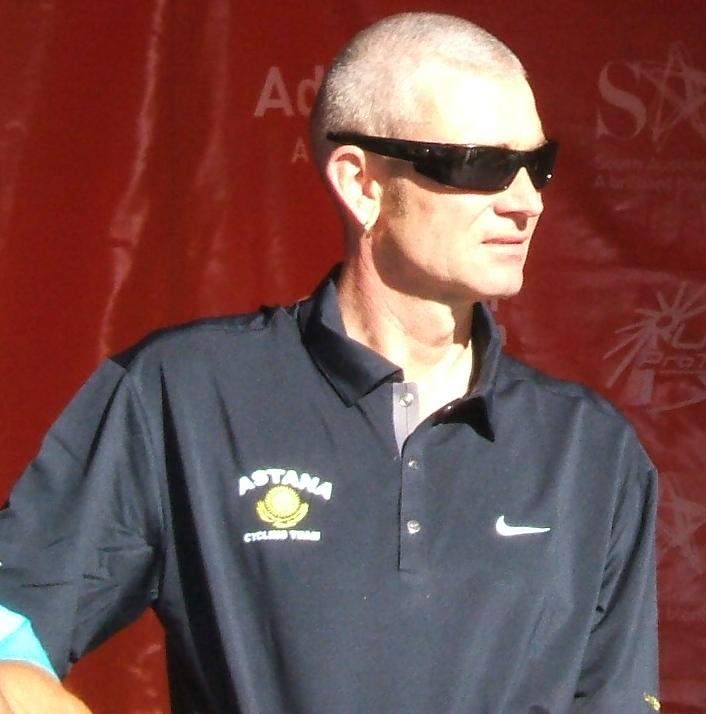
- Yates in 2009

Personal information
- Full name: Sean Yates
- Nickname: The Animal
- Born: 18 May 1960 (age 66) Ewell, Surrey, England

Cycling career
- Sport: Cycling
- Current team: Retired
- Discipline: Road
- Role: Rider

Amateur teams
- ?: Archer Road Club
- 1980: 34th Nomads
- 1981: ACBB

Professional teams
- 1982–1986: Peugeot
- 1987–1988: Fagor
- 1989–1990: 7-Eleven
- 1991–1996: Motorola

Managerial teams
- 1998–2001: Linda McCartney Racing Team
- 2002: iTeamNova.com
- 2003–2004: Team CSC
- 2005–2007: Discovery Channel
- 2008–2009: Astana
- 2010–2012: Team Sky
- 2014: NFTO
- 2015–2016: Tinkoff–Saxo

Major wins
- Grand Tours Tour de France 1 individual stage (1988) Vuelta a España 1 individual stage (1988) Stage races Tour of Belgium (1989) One-day races and Classics National Road Race Championships (1992)

Sean Yates (born 18 May 1960) is an English former professional cyclist and directeur sportif.

== Career ==
Yates competed at the 1980 Summer Olympics, finishing sixth in the 4,000m individual pursuit. As an amateur in 1980, he won the British 25-mile individual time trial championship, and took the national record for 10-mile time trials with 19m 44s.

As an amateur Yates rode for Athletic Club Boulogne-Billancourt in Paris, Europe's most successful sports club with fellow British riders Kevin Reilly from Southport, John Herety and Jeff Williams. Yates first race for the ACBB was the Grand Prix de Saint-Tropez which he won by riding off the front of the peloton. Yates won fifteen races in total for the ACBB and also finished third in the prestigious individual time trial Grand Prix des Nations which was won by Martial Gayant. Yates had developed a reputation as a strong time trialist and for an incredible turn of speed and power. He turned professional in 1982 for Peugeot riding alongside Graham Jones, Phil Anderson, Robert Millar and Stephen Roche. He stayed with Peugeot for six seasons and became British professional individual pursuit champion in 1982 and 1983.

In 1988 riding for Fagor, he won the sixth stage of the Tour de France, a 52 km time-trial, beating Roberto Visentini by 14 seconds and Tony Rominger by 23 seconds. That year he also won a stage at the Vuelta a España, Paris–Nice, Midi-Libre and finished fourth overall in the Tour of Britain.

In 1989 he joined the American team, 7-Eleven and took two stages and overall victory in the Tour of Belgium, won the Grand Prix Eddy Merckx and finished second in Gent–Wevelgem. In 1991 Yates then moved to Motorola, where he rode with Lance Armstrong. During stage six of the 1994 Tour de France Yates got into a breakaway and took the overall lead by one second over Gianluca Bortolami. He became only the third Briton to wear the yellow jersey. He wore it for one day and after Bradley Wiggins won the 2012 Tour de France he sold it to him; this has become Wiggins' most prized possession in his collection.

Yates retired in 1996 having competed in 12 Tours, completing nine; 45th was his best placing overall.

Yates spent much of his 15-year career as a domestique. He was powerful on flat stages and noted as a descender of mountains. For a rouleur Yates climbed very well for his weight.

== Doping ==
In 1989, Yates tested positive for anabolic steroids in a doping test in the first stage of Torhout-Werchter. However, his 'B' sample did not confirm the 'A' sample and Yates was subsequently cleared because it was accepted that a labelling error must have occurred and the tested sample was not his.

Following the report in October 2012 from the US Anti-Doping Agency that detailed organised doping in the US Postal/Discovery Channel teams, Yates insisted on BBC Radio 5 Live that he saw nothing suspicious during his six years working alongside Lance Armstrong.

== Management career ==
After retiring in 1996, Yates became manager of the Linda McCartney Racing Team, which competed at the Giro d'Italia. After the team's collapse in 2001, Yates helped set up the Australian iteamNova but left after funds ran out. After six months out of cycling, he joined Team CSC-Tiscali before moving to Discovery, in 2005, at the invitation of Lance Armstrong. In June 2007, Yates was manager of Team Discovery a USA team and, in 2008, went on to manage riders on the Astana cycling team.

In 2009, he was signed up as director of the newly formed Team Sky, a British-based team intent on providing Britain's first Tour de France winner. Yates spent three years as the team's lead Director Sportif and, in 2012, presided over Bradley Wiggins' victories in Paris–Nice, Tour de Romandie, Critérium du Dauphiné, Tour de France and the Olympic Time Trial. However, his race support during the 2012 Tour de France was heavily criticised by Mark Cavendish who described Yates as "cold, uninspiring and miserly in praise."

In October 2012, he left Team Sky and retired from cycling, with the Daily Telegraph reporting that Yates had been forced to quit after admitting involvement in doping, meaning he did not meet the team's zero tolerance stance on doping. Both Sky and Yates denied these claims with Yates stating that the decision to resign was based on ill health and a desire to spend more time with his family.

After a year away from the sport, Yates took the position of directeur sportif for the NFTO team from the 2014 season. Subsequently, Yates clarified that this role would be limited to the first three rounds of the Premier Calendar and the Tour Series. He was also involved in coaching the Catford CC-Equipe Banks under-23 team, which includes his son Liam on its roster. He was one of their sports directors for Team Tinkoff–Saxo in the 2015 and 2016 seasons.

Since relocating to Spain, he has worked part time as a coaching consultant.

== Post-professional racing ==
In 1997, he won the British 50-mile time-trial championship, and he finished third in the same event in 2005. In May 2007, he said he would not compete as a veteran because of heart irregularities.

In 2009, he was inducted into the British Cycling Hall of Fame.

In late 2016, Yates had an accident in the course of doing part-time gardening work, and was hospitalised for several weeks. This delayed his plan to move to a small farm near Useras in Spain, where he was living as of June 2020.

In 2022 he was given Cycling Weekly's Lifetime Achievement award, recognising not only his multiple achievements but also a lifetime involvement in the sport.

== Major results ==
1979
6th GP de France
1980
1st Prologue Sealink International
1st Overall Girvan
Olympic Games

6th Individual pursuit
7th Team pursuit (with M.Elliot, T.Doyle and G.Mitchell)

2nd GP de France
1981
1st Grand Prix de Saint-Tropez
1st GP de France
1st Issoire
2nd Flèche d'Or
3rd Grand Prix des Nations Amateurs
1982
1st Stage 3 Tour d'Indre-et-Loire
1st Stage 4 Circuit de la Sarthe
1st Airedale
1st Classic New Southsea
1st Great Yorkshire
1st Southsea
1983
1st London
5th Overall Milk Race
1984
1st Bristol
1st Prologue Four Days of Dunkirk
3rd Overall Tour of Sweden
1985
2nd Nice–Alassio
1986
1st Stage 2 Milk Race
1987
1st Grand Prix de Cannes
1st Stage 3 Nissan Classic
8th Grand Prix des Nations
1988
1st Stage 6 Tour de France
1st Stage 12 Vuelta a España
1st Stage 1 Paris–Nice
1st Stage 5 Grand Prix du Midi Libre
4th Overall Tour of Britain
1989
1st Overall Tour of Belgium

1st Stages 1a & 1b

1st Grand Prix Eddy Merckx
1st Prologue Ronde van Nederland
2nd Gent–Wevelgem
1990
3rd Overall Nissan Classic
3rd Trofeo Baracchi
1991
1st Stage 5 Critérium du Dauphiné Libéré
2nd Overall Nissan Classic

1st Stage 4

1992
1st Road race, National Road Championships
1993
1st Stage 3 Tour DuPont
8th Paris–Roubaix
1994
1st USPRO Championship
2nd Thrift Drug Classic
2nd Grand Prix d'Isbergues
3rd Paris–Brussels
5th Paris–Roubaix
Tour de France

Held after Stage 6

== See also ==
- List of British cyclists
- List of British cyclists who have led the Tour de France general classification
- Yellow jersey statistics
