= Chas Messenger =

Personal information
- Full name: Charles William Messenger
- Born: 1 January 1914 London, England, United Kingdom
- Died: 26 July 2008 (aged 94)

Cycling career
- Sport: Cycling
- Discipline: Road
- Role: Rider

Charles William Messenger (January–March 1914 – 26 July 2008) was a British cyclist, a former Milk Race organiser and British road team manager.

Messenger was born in London. He began cycling in the King's Cross area, and despite being a "mediocre" rider in his own words, he beat the hour for a 25-mile time trial at a time when this was rarely achieved.

== Tour of Britain ==
Messenger was an official of the British League of Racing Cyclists, which started during the Second World War to promote massed racing on public roads. The BLRC organised Tours of Britain under different names and sponsors and in 1958 secured sponsorship from the Milk Marketing Board. Messenger was the BLRC's event organiser and he and other officials visited the board at a hotel in central London. He said:

Our first meeting with the sponsor's PRO, Reg Pugh, was a near-fiasco, for the three of us, Eddie Lawton, Les Keith and myself, were working and groping in the dark, having to rely on figures conjured out of thin air by treasurer Ruben Smith. So poor, too, were we at this time that we arrived at the posh West End hotel with only enough money between the three of us to get back home. We came away elated, with more or less the 'Tour' in our pockets. We also came away with a budget well below what was needed for we had promised foreign teams (but no one said how we were going to get them.)

Messenger ran the Tour of Britain, known as the Milk Race, from 1958 to 1965. He was succeeded by Maurice Cumberworth. Messenger's Tour emphasised on long, hilly stages.

== Merger with the NCU ==
Messenger and Peter Itter, chairman of the rival National Cycling Union, forged the links which merged the organisations to form the British Cycling Federation in 1959. He negotiated with the police to hold races on open roads. He became vice-chairman of the BCF's racing committee, which picked teams, for seven years. He managed the British road team four times between 1962 and 1967, culminating in the world championships in which Graham Webb won the men's amateur road race and Beryl Burton the women's event.

He was sacked in September 1967 without explanation from the British Cycling Federation. He subsequently stepped in to run the 1982 UCI Road World Championships, which were held at Goodwood.

== Honours ==
The Chas Messenger road race, established in 2001, was named in his honour. It is a Premier Calendar event. Messenger was at the 2008 race.

In 2009, he was inducted into the British Cycling Hall of Fame.

== Writing ==
Messenger wrote several books in a style described as "intensely personal" and in which his "grasp of history doesn't always follow a chronological pattern", "but he's always an entertaining and exciting writer who never allows himself to worry unduly about such obstacles as spelling, grammar, punctuation."

== Private life and personality ==
Messenger spent his adult life in west London, where he worked in local government. He was a member of the Chequers Road Club and an official of the British Cycling Federation's west London division. He was a prolific organiser of races. He was known for a brusque personality. An obituary by British Cycling said: "His propensity for direct action and getting things done rather than long-winded committee debate made him a controversial figure to some then amateur attitudes."

== Bibliography ==
- Messenger, Chas (1968). Conquer the World. London: Pelham Books. p. 215.
- Messenger, Chas (1970). Cycling Crazy. London: Pelham Books. p. 173. ISBN 978-0-7207-0331-3.
- Messenger, Chas (1971). Cycling's Circus. London: Pelham Books. p. 183. ISBN 978-0-7207-0490-7.
- Messenger, Chas (1972). Where there's a Wheel. London: Pelham Books. p. 215. ISBN 0-7207-0564-9.
- Messenger, Chas (1998). Ride and be Damned. Harpenden: Pedal Publishing. p. 151. ISBN 978-0-9534096-0-0.
