= Pat Adams (cycle race organiser) =

British cyclist

Pat Adams is in the British Cycling Hall of Fame. He organised Mountain Mayhem and Sleepless in the Saddle.
