= Michel Vermote =

Belgian cyclist

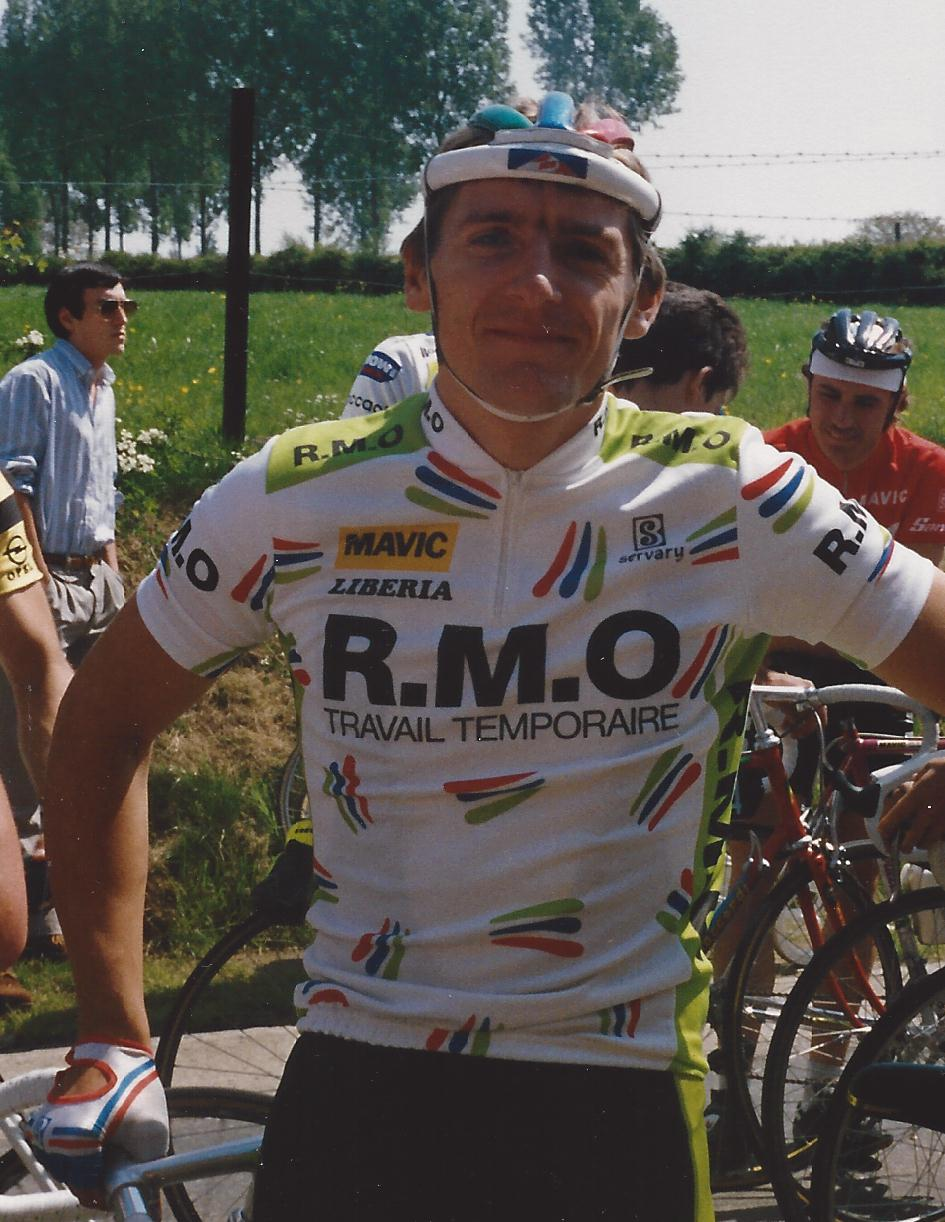

Personal information
- Born: 31 March 1963 (age 63) Tournai, Belgium

Cycling career
- Sport: Cycling
- Discipline: Road
- Role: Rider

Professional teams
- 1985: La Redoute
- 1986–1992: RMO–Cycles Méral–Mavic
- 1993–1994: Festina–Lotus
- 1995: Le Groupement
- 1996: Agrigel–La Creuse–Fenioux

Michel Vermote (born 31 March 1963) is a former Belgian racing cyclist. He rode in ten Grand Tours between 1987 and 1996.

== Major results ==
1985
8th Circuit des Frontières
1986
2nd Overall Tour de Picardie

1st Stage 2a

4th Brussels–Ingooigem
8th Overall Tour de Luxembourg

1st Stage 3a

1987
1st Stage 2a Route du Sud
1st Stage 3b Tour de Luxembourg
2nd GP Stad Zottegem
6th Overall Tour of Britain

1st Points classification
1st Stage 5

1988
1st Stage 4 Route du Sud
2nd GP de Denain
8th Overall Circuit Cycliste Sarthe

1st Stage 3

8th Bordeaux–Paris
1989
8th Grand Prix de la Libération (TTT)
1990
2nd Overall Circuit Cycliste Sarthe

1st Stage 1

2nd Overall Étoile de Bessèges
2nd Brussels–Ingooigem
1991
1st Overall Tour du Limousin

1st Stage 1

1st Stage 1 Paris–Bourges
3rd Binche–Tournai–Binche
1992
1st Omloop van de Westhoek
1st Stage 1 Tour du Poitou Charentes et de la Vienne
5th Grand Prix d'Ouverture La Marseillaise
1993
4th Circuit des Frontières
1994
3rd Zomergem–Adinkerke
1995
2nd Nokere Koerse
1997
1st Overall Le Triptyque des Monts et Châteaux

1st Stages 1 & 3
