= British Cycling Hall of Fame =

Hall of fame in Manchester, England

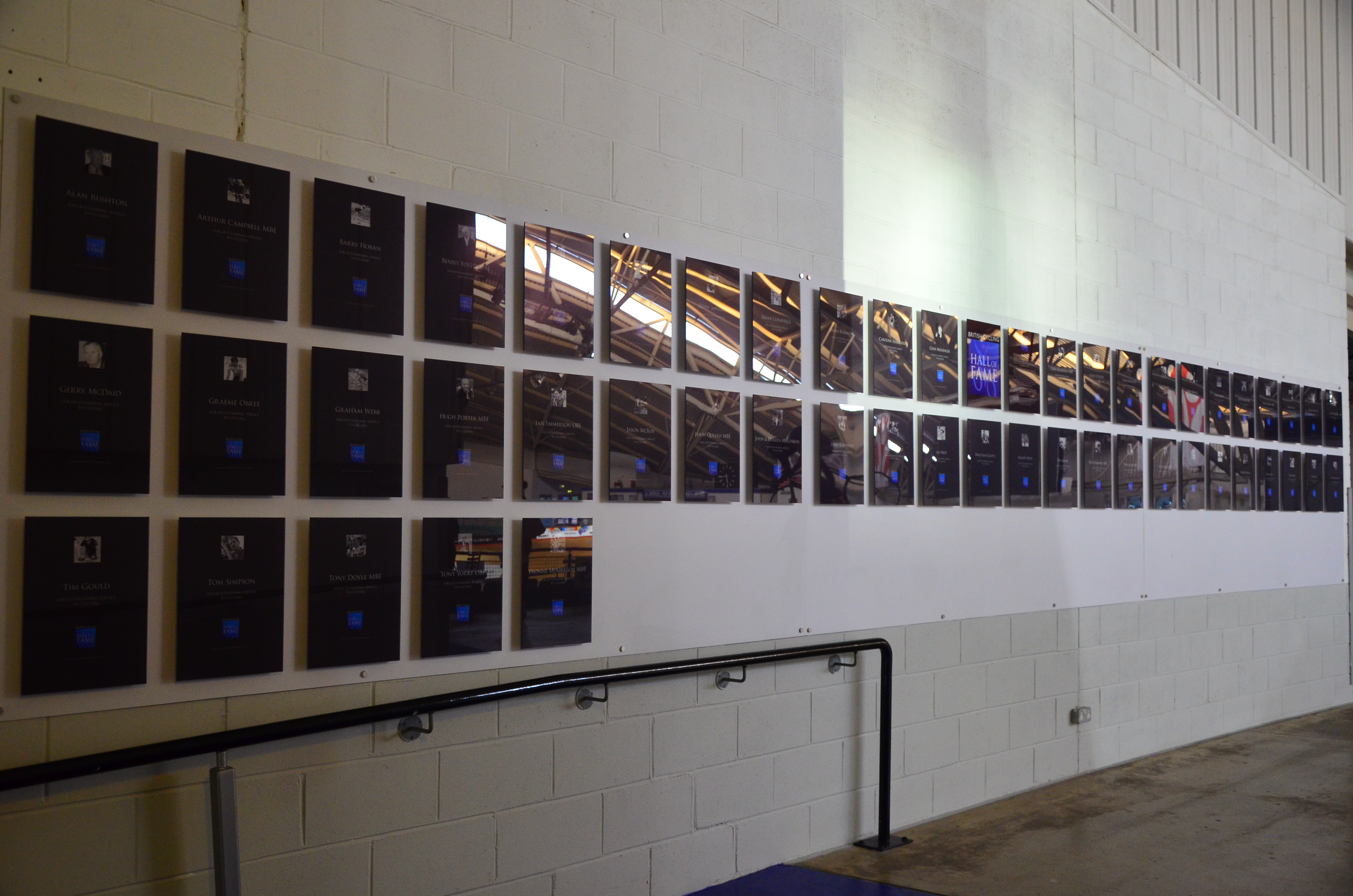
British Cycling Hall of Fame at the Manchester Velodrome

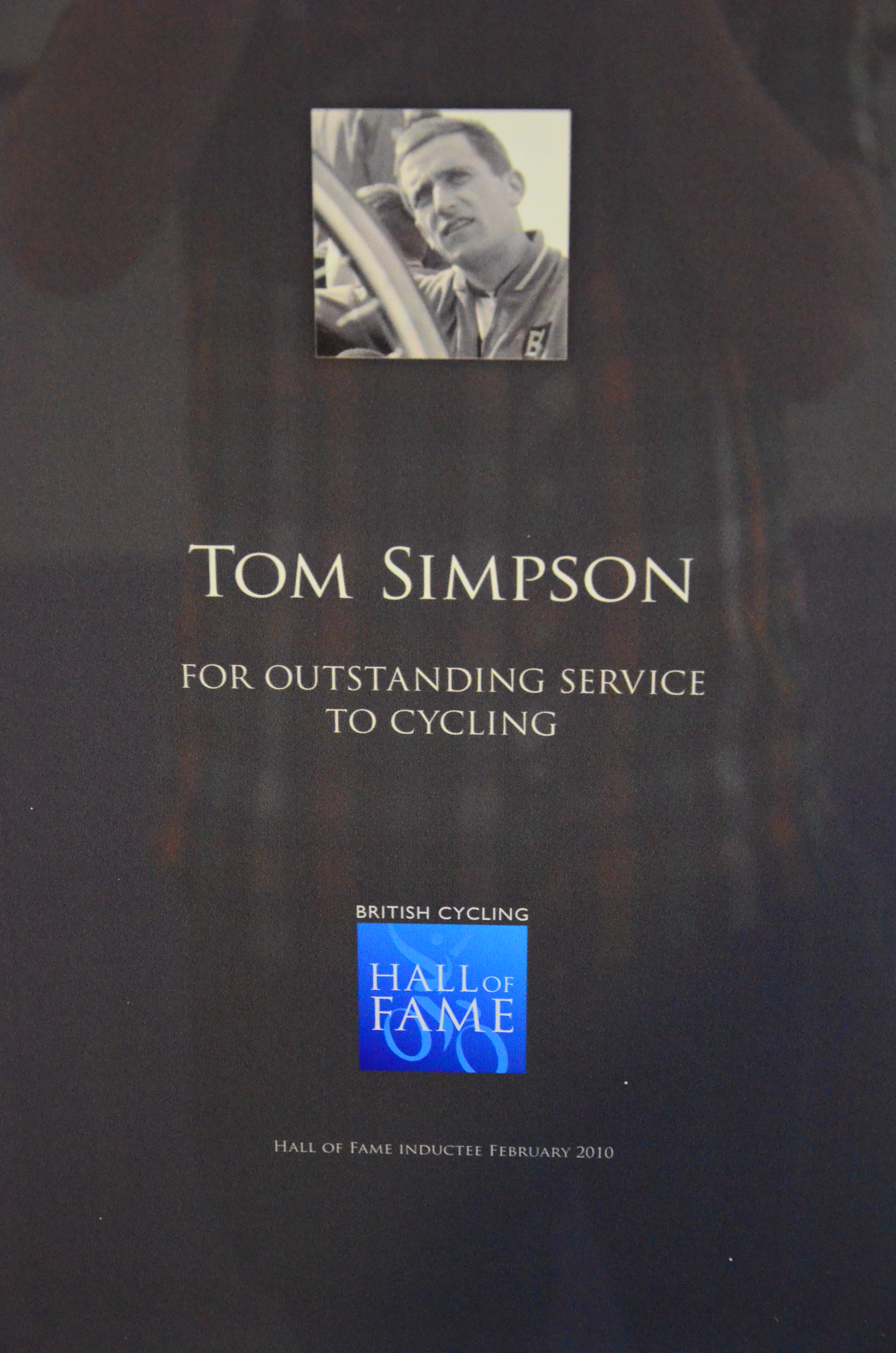
Tom Simpson's certificate in the British Cycling Hall of Fame

The British Cycling Hall of Fame was established in 2009 as part of British Cycling's 50th anniversary celebrations.

On 17 December 2009, the names of fifty one people involved in cycling to be inducted into the British Cycling Hall of Fame were announced. The selection panel, whose job it was to whittle the names down from 300 nominations, consisted of Brian Cookson, William Fotheringham, Robert Garbutt, Peter King, Victoria Pendleton and Hugh Porter. The inaugural induction ceremony was held on 20 February 2010 at Manchester Central, hosted by television present Dermot Murnaghan. Further members were inducted in 2014, 2016, 2023 and 2024.

== Members ==
British Cycling Hall of Fame members
Name	Year inducted	Notes	Ref(s)
Pat Adams	2010		
Caroline Alexander	2010		
Brian Annable	2010		
David Baker	2010		
Sid Barras	2010		
Stuart Benstead	2010		
Chris Boardman	2010		
Bill Bradley	2010		
Beryl Burton	2010		
Keith Butler	2010		
Arthur Campbell	2010		
Brian Cossavella	2010		
Doug Dailey	2010		
Tony Doyle	2010		
Ian Emmerson	2010		
Malcolm Elliott	2010		
Benny Foster	2010		
Tim Gould	2010		
Eileen Gray	2010		
Dave Hemsley	2010		
Barry Hoban	2010		
Dale Holmes	2010		
Mandy Jones	2010		
Peter Keen	2010		
Peter King	2010		
Stan Kite	2010		
Phil Liggett	2010		
Craig MacLean	2010		
Paul Manning	2010		
John Mallinson	2010		
Doreen Mallinson	2010		
Yvonne McGregor	2010		
Gerry McDaid	2010		
Jason McRoy	2010		
Chas Messenger	2010		
George Miller	2010		
Robert Millar	2010		
Graeme Obree	2010		
Hugh Porter	2010		
Jason Queally	2010		
John Rawnsley	2010		
Brian Robinson	2010		
Alan Rushton	2010		
Tom Simpson	2010		
Eddie Soens	2010		
Colin Sturgess	2010		
Dot Tilbury	2010		
Graham Webb	2010		
Les West	2010		
Sean Yates	2010		
Tony Yorke	2010		
Victoria Pendleton	2014		
Rob Hayles	2014		
Roger Hammond	2014		
Chris Hoy	2014		
Nicole Cooke	2014		
Brian Cookson	2014		
Norman Shiel	2014		
Mick Bennett	2016		
Harold Nelson	2016		
Bill Owen	2016		
John Barclay	2016		
Dave Brailsford	2016		
Eileen Sheridan	2016		
Keith Lambert	2016		
Maurice Burton	2023		
Emma Pooley	2023		
Rebecca Romero	2023		
Paul Sherwen	2023		
Ed Clancy	2024		
Carole Gosling	2024		
Mike Jardine	2024		
Jason Kenny	2024		
Laura Kenny	2024		
Carole Leigh	2024		
Aileen McGlynn	2024		
Richard Moore	2024		
Tracy Moseley	2024		
Shanaze Reade	2024		
Dani Rowe	2024		
Joanna Rowsell	2024		
Bradley Wiggins	2024		
