= Graham Webb =

English cyclist (1944–2017)

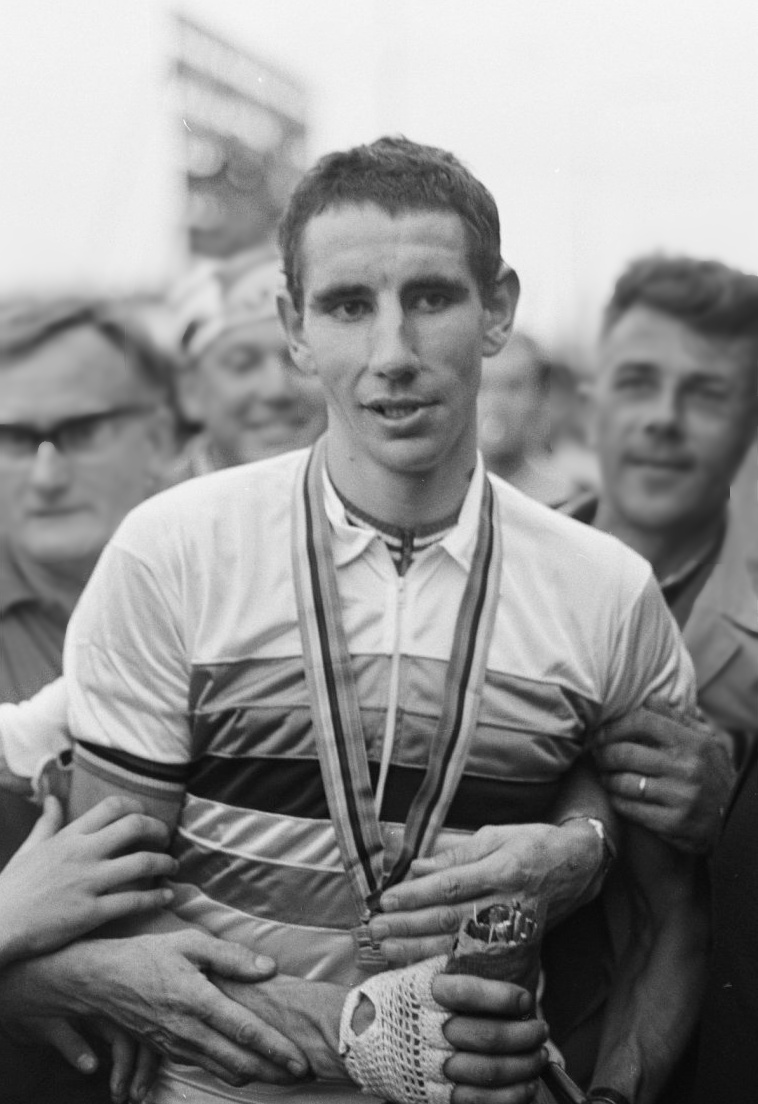
- Graham Webb in 1967

Personal information
- Full name: Graham Paul Webb
- Nickname: Black Raven
- Born: 13 January 1944 England, United Kingdom
- Died: 28 May 2017 (aged 73)

Cycling career
- Sport: Cycling
- Disciplines: Track & Road
- Role: Rider

Professional teams
- 1968: Mercier – BP – Hutchinson
- 1969: Pull Over Centrale – Tasmania

Major wins
- World Amateur RR Champion; Several national records
Medal record
Men's road bicycle racing
Representing United Kingdom
World Championships
Gold medal – first place	1967 Heerlen	Amateur's Road Race

Graham Paul Webb (13 January 1944 – 28 May 2017) was an English racing cyclist who became the world amateur road race champion in 1967. In response to a journalist's shouted comment that the last British amateur world road champion had been Dave Marsh 45 years earlier, Webb retorted: "And they'll have to wait another 45 years before another British rider wins." Not only did no British man win a world road race championship in the following 45 years, but none can now win the amateur championship as the segregation between amateur and professional cycling no longer exists.

== Biography ==
=== Early days ===
Graham Webb was born on 13 January 1944, as the youngest of five children brought up by a war widow in a slum in Birmingham, England. He was given the last rites twice as a child before gaining his health.

He got his first bike when he was eight and soon enjoyed going not only on long rides, but rides of such length that they were beyond him. He began riding from Birmingham to Gloucester and back, just because it was a magical 100-mile (160 km) round trip, and persisted until he could do it without literally falling into a ditch from exhaustion. He succeeded 'non-stop' only on his third attempt. "I just enjoyed doing it," he said. "I enjoyed suffering, I suppose. I still do."

Webb entered his first race aged 17, a 25-mile (40 km) time trial. Unaware of what he was supposed to do, shy and not understanding why competitors were starting individually as opposed to together in a bunch, Webb waited until he was called, by which point, he was late for his allocated start time; the time was calculated from the allocated start time instead of his actual start time as a penalty.

Wearing a T-shirt and pumps, Webb set off under the impression that he had to catch the riders that had started ahead of him in order to win. He was hampered initially as one of his pumps fell off and he had to wait for cars to pass before being able to return to collect his shoe and continue. Webb later commented that "I quickly caught someone and waited for him. And he was telling me 'clear off, clear off' – very unsociable, I thought. I rode on, went round the turn in the road, came back; and the chain jumped off between the block and the frame. So I had to get off the bike, and I'd got a whole tool kit with me, spanner, oil can, cloth for cleaning my hands and so on, and this was wrapped round my seat tube with a spare inner tube. I had to undo the back wheel, put the chain on, do up the wheel nuts, put everything behind the seat tube and carry on."

The following Thursday evening, Webb went to his club meeting; as usual he stood painfully shy to one side. Eventually he was asked if he was Graham Webb, because if he was, he was the winner of the race. He had ridden the 25 miles in 1 hour 1 minute and 31 seconds. Had it not been for the penalty of the late start and mechanical trouble, Webb would have broken the hour on an ordinary sports bicycle; at a time when to ride 25 miles in less than an hour was still the dream of most experienced cyclists.

=== Racing career ===
Webb spent the next years competing in several time trials and often won mass-start events on the road. Attempts to ride well in the British national track team, according to Webb, were hindered by the team's persistent lack of morale and ambition.

On a Monday evening in 1966 at Salford Park, Birmingham, having led his team to win the National Team Pursuit Championships the previous Saturday, Webb set new national track records at 10 miles, 25 miles and 1 hour; on a track which had shallow bankings and bumpy tarmac, and on which it was deemed impossible to set any kind of record. The 10-mile record had never previously been set during an hour record attempt; spectators were shouting at Webb to "slow down, you'll not last the distance at that speed!". Webb took no notice and went on to beat the old hour record by approximately 400 metres. His new record remained unbeaten for many years.

In 1967, Webb and his wife sold all they owned and moved to Hilversum in the Netherlands, where a Dutch journalist and race organiser, Charles Ruys, had offered to find him a club and accommodation. In his first Dutch race, a semi-classic called the Omloop van de Baronie, Webb crashed over a river bank and finished 16th dripping mud and slime. After that he began winning regularly, often lapping the field several times at criteriums.

Webb's attempts at the World Track Championship in 1967 came to nothing. He trained between 200 and 300 kilometres a day for the World Road Race Championship which followed a week later. Webb got into the important breakaway in this race but dropped back to help a fellow British rider, Peter Buckley, up to the front, on his return to the front of the race Webb discovered that a handful of riders had broken away. Webb led the chase, dropping Buckley in the process, and took the lead in a corner late in the race, accelerating clear to win alone.

=== Turning professional ===
Webb turned professional in 1968 for the Mercier team which included Raymond Poulidor and another French star, Jean Stablinski, although things started going wrong from the moment a shipping strike stranded him in Sardinia, where he had been training, forcing him to miss the team's first race. On his return home to Belgium, his racing equipment was stolen from his car, which was parked at the time in the center of Turin, Italy. This was only two days before his first professional race, the then classic Omloop Het Volk. Mechanical trouble in the Omloop Het Volk, followed by knee pain in Kuurne-Brussels-Kuurne meant that by the time he was fit to ride Paris-Nice, the team's leaders had abandoned him to the extent that he found himself alone in the rain at the end of the first stage, he left his bike in a bar in Paris and was given a lift home by a spectator.

Webb rode a further year as a professional but without success. He opened a bar and had his world champion's rainbow jersey on display; when it became dirty from cigarette smoke, and as depression rose over what could have been, Webb took it down and threw it in the fire. Webb was later employed at a steel works in Ghent, as a crane operator. He never lived in Britain again, saying he was glad to leave as it had too many memories of abuse and poverty.

Webb raced successfully as an amateur, especially on the track, but became seriously unwell when he suffered an abdominal aortic aneurysm whilst riding in Ghent. Restored to close to normal health, Webb was a regular figure at bike races in Belgium. His two links with his former country were his willingness to help British riders trying to race in Belgium (although he claimed the British Cycling Federation never replied to his offer to work without pay as its permanent representative there) and his passion for MGB sports cars, which he drove from his home at Wachtebeke north of Ghent.

== Honours ==
In 2007, Webb was acknowledged by his home town, Birmingham, on the birmingham.gov.uk web site, as a famous 'Brummie'.

In 2009, he was inducted into the British Cycling Hall of Fame.

== Palmarès ==
1966
1st Individual Pursuit, British National Track Championships
1st Team Pursuit, British National Track Championships for division teams
1st Team Pursuit, British National Track Championships
National track record – 10 miles, 25 miles & 1 hour

1967
1st World Amateur Road Race Championships, Heerlen
3rd GP d'Espéraza (FRA)
16th Omloop van de Baronie (NED)
1st Ghent Amateur Six Day Cycle Race (BEL)

1968
3rd Gavere (BEL)
1st Tienen (BEL)
1st Tessenderlo Criterium (BEL)
1st Kalmthout (BEL)
