= Paul Watson (cyclist) =

English cyclist

Personal information
- Born: 5 May 1962 (age 64) England; United Kingdom

Cycling career
- Sport: Cycling
- Discipline: Road
- Role: Rider

Professional teams
- 1986: Raleigh - Weinmann
- 1987: ANC-Halfords
- 1988: Hitachi

Major wins
- National Champion (1985)

Paul Watson (born 5 May 1962) is a former professional English road racing cyclist from Milton Keynes. He was national road race champion, raced in the Tour de France and made headlines finishing 6th in the Belgium classic La Flèche Wallonne.

== Palmarès ==
=== Road ===
1984
2nd Grand Prix de la Ville de Lillers
1985
14th World Championship road race (Amateur)
1st Stage 10 Milk Race, Halifax
3rd Overall, Milk Race
Winner of the British National Road Race Championships (Amateur)
1986
3rd Stage 11 Milk Race, Welwyn Garden City
3rd in Stage 1 Mercian Two-Day
3rd Overall, Mercian Two-Day
1987
3rd La Marseillaise
6th British National Road Race Championships (Professional)
DNF- Tour de France
3rd GP Besseges
6th La Flèche Wallonne
4th Overall, Milk Race
5th Norwich Spring Classic

=== General classification results timeline ===
Race	1987
Giro d'Italia	—
Tour de France	DNF
Vuelta a España	—

=== Cyclo Cross ===
1981
2nd British National Cyclo Cross Championships
1982
4th British National Cyclo Cross Championships

== Sources ==
- Fleche Redux: Paul Watson Remembers '87
- ANC-HALFORDS: Paul Watson
- commentary » paul watson
- The-Sports.org
