= ANC–Halfords =

Team information
- Registered: United Kingdom
- Founded: 1985
- Disbanded: 1987
- Discipline: Road
- Bicycles: Peugeot
- Components: Campagnolo

Team name history
- 1985–1986 1987: ANC–Freight–Rover; ANC–Halfords

ANC–Halfords was a British-based professional team that was created in 1985 but folded in 1987 due to a lack of funds. The team used Peugeot cycles with Campagnolo components. ANC–Halfords was the last British-based team that rode the Tour de France until Barloworld was invited in 2007.

== History ==
=== The 1985 and 1986 season ===
In 1985, the ANC-Freight-Rover team was formed in 1985 by the transport operator Tony Capper and the former racing cyclist Phil Griffiths, who had plans to get the team into the Tour de France. The team competed on the Continent and in Britain. In Britain, the British Cycling Federation limited teams to six riders, while continental squads had 20 or more. To get around this, the squad in Britain split into three different teams with different sponsors e.g. Lycra-Halfords. On the Continent, all the riders rode under one team name.

=== 1987: the Tour de France ===
In 1987, the team rode under the name ANC–Halfords. In races outside England, the team was co-sponsored by Tönissteiner. ANC got a wildcard invitation to ride the 1987 Tour de France. The team were inexperienced as only Graham Jones had ridden a major stage race. The team turned up in Berlin and were promised the best equipment such as specialist time-trial cycles. Instead, they rode the opening time trial on standard road bikes, with only four disc wheels between nine riders. Only four riders made it to Paris. The only success was Malcolm Elliot's third place on one stage. The best ranked cyclist in the general classification was Adrian Timmis, ranked 70th. The Tour de France had required a £37,000 entry fee. Some of the cyclists stopped early in the race, and Tony Capper invited guests (including his family and potential sponsors) to take their already reserved hotel rooms.

In the last week of the race, Tony Capper left the team, and they did not see him anymore.

After the Tour de France, the ANC team was only revived for a few races. Joey McLoughlin won the first Kellogg's Tour of Britain and Malcolm Elliott won two stages in the Nissan Classic in Ireland. By the end of the season, the team ran out of money and was no more.

The team's period in the Tour de France and the chaos that surrounded it is captured in Wide-eyed and Legless by the British writer Jeff Connor.

== Notable riders ==
- Malcolm Elliott.

After ANC, Elliott rode for several continental squads including the Spanish Teka team with which in 1989 he won the points jersey in the Vuelta a España. After racing in Europe, Elliot had a successful stint on the U.S. pro circuit which included a stage in the Tour du Pont. At 50, Elliot is still racing in the British domestic circuit with the Node-4 team which he also is a director sportif.

- Joey McLoughlin.

After winning the 1986 Milk Race and the 1987 Kellogg's tour, McLoughlin was tipped to become the best British cyclist since Tom Simpson. After ANC, he signed to the French Z squad. Constant injuries robbed McLoughlin of his potential and he retired in 1991.

- Shane Sutton.

The Australian rider went on to win the 1990 Milk Race with the Banana-Falcon squad. Sutton settled in Britain and worked as a coach with British Cycling which included the hugely successful team that dominated the cycling events in the 2008 Olympic games in China. Shane became a director sportif with Team Sky where he has personally coached Bradley Wiggins and has been awarded an OBE in the 2010 birthday honours list. He is currently coaching at the Chinese national cycling programme, where the aim is to create a Chinese Tour De France winner by 2024.

- Graham Jones

The Manchester rider is often described as one of the classiest riders that the UK has produced, but his career was hindered by being over raced in his early days, and by injury in his later days. He was route director of the Tour of Britain cycle race. Now lives in Chang Mai in Thailand and does the odd commentary job for Eurosport.

- Paul Watson

Paul Watson described his experiences with ANC-Halfords, including completing six stages of the Tour de France, in an edition of the Cycling Podcast, in June 2017.

=== Other notable riders ===
David Akam, Nigel Bloor, Bernard Chesneau, Stuart Coles, Mike Doyle, Adrian Timmis, Terry Sweeney, Chris Whorton, Steve Jones

== Doping allegations ==
David Walsh, in his 2012 book Seven Deadly Sins, which relates his efforts to expose Lance Armstrong's use of performance-enhancing drugs and techniques, reports that one of his key witnesses, Stephen Swart, had encountered doping at ANC–Halfords, his first professional cycling team. Walsh notes that before the team broke up, the riders had been rounded up by their soigneur and each injected with an undetermined substance. Swart is quoted as saying:

You think it can't be bad since it doesn't test positive. And I wasn't big enough to have the right to ask questions. I remember two cyclists from the team who carried their own briefcases, and it wasn't papers that they carried around with them.
