= Phil Griffiths (cyclist) =

English racing cyclist

Personal information
- Born: 18 March 1949 (age 77) UK

Cycling career
- Sport: Cycling
- Discipline: Road
- Role: Rider (retired); Team Director

Amateur teams
- Gloucester City CC
- City of Stoke ACCS
- GS Strada

Managerial teams
- ANC–Halfords
- CandiTV-Marshalls Pasta
- Motorpoint-Marshalls Pasta
- Motorpoint
- Velosure–Giordana

Major wins
- Milk Race, 1 Stage
Medal record
Representing England
Men's road bicycle racing
Commonwealth Games
Silver medal – second place	Christchurch 1974	Individual Road Race

Phil Griffiths (born 18 March 1949) is an English former racing cyclist from Stone, Staffordshire.

== Cycling career ==
He rode for Great Britain in the Olympic Games, and represented England winning a silver medal in the road race, at the 1974 British Commonwealth Games in Christchurch, New Zealand. Four years later he represented England in the road race and individual pursuit, at the 1978 Commonwealth Games in Edmonton, Alberta, Canada.

He is one of the few British riders to have held the yellow jersey in the Peace Race.

== Cycling management ==
He is currently the Team Director of Velosure–Giordana and previously managed ANC–Halfords which was the first British-based professional team to enter the Tour de France.

== Palmarès ==
1971
1st British Best All-Rounder
3rd Tour of the Cotswolds
1972
(United Kingdom) 2nd British National Road Race Championships (Amateur)
1973
3rd Archer Grand Prix
1st Overall, Premier Calendar

30th Overall, Peace Race

3rd stage 2, Peace Race
6th stage 4, Peace Race

on stage 4

1974
Commonwealth Games, Road Race
3rd Overall, Premier Calendar
2nd Tour of the Cotswolds
1st British Best All-Rounder
1975
(United Kingdom) 2nd British National Road Race Championships (Amateur)
1st Overall, Premier Calendar
1st British Best All-Rounder
1976
DNF Olympic Games, Road race
6th Olympic Games, Team Time Trial (100km)
1st British Best All-Rounder
(United Kingdom) 3rd British National Road Race Championships (Amateur)
1977
3rd Lincoln GP
1978
29th Commonwealth Games, Road Race
QF Commonwealth Games, 4000m Individual pursuit, Track
1st Archer Grand Prix
1st stage 4, Girvan
1st prologue, Milk Race
1979
14th GP des Nations
1st British Best All-Rounder
