= Joey McLoughlin =

English cyclist

Personal information
- Full name: Joseph McLoughlin
- Born: 3 December 1964 (age 61) England; United Kingdom

Cycling career
- Sport: Cycling
- Discipline: Road
- Role: Rider

Amateur teams
- 1983: Liverpool Mercury
- 1984: GS Strada

Professional teams
- 1985: ANC-Freight-Rover
- 1986-1987: ANC-Halfords
- 1988-1989: Z-Peugeot
- 1990: Ever Ready-Halfords
- 1991: Townsend Cycles.

Major wins
- Sealink International; Milk Race; Kellogg's Tour of Britain (1987)

Joey McLoughlin (born 3 December 1964) is an English former professional cyclist from Liverpool. He grew up on the Cantril Farm housing estate in Liverpool, the youngest of 11 children.

As a child and teenager, he was a neighbour of many people who went on to be famous, including footballers Ian Bishop, David Fairclough and Mick Quinn, musicians Paul Rutherford (Frankie Goes to Hollywood), and most members of The Farm, along with actor and comedian Craig Charles.

McLoughlin's talent and aggressive riding as a junior and young senior caused excitement in the British cycling press. He turned professional in 1985 and in his second year came 4th in the Dutch one-day classic, the Amstel Gold Race. Riding for the ANC Halfords professional team, he won the 1986 Milk Race following a long attack through the hills and valleys of South Wales on the Carmarthen to Cardiff stage. Despite this early promise his wins were few due to a series of injuries (especially tendinitis) and he was unable to ride the 1987 Tour de France with the ANC team. After that team folded he rode for other professional teams until his retirement in 1991.

== Palmarès ==
1983
2nd Girvan 3 day

1984
(United Kingdom) 3rd British National Road Race Championships (Amateur)
2nd Overall, Premier Calendar
1985
1st Overall Sealink International

1st stage 6, Sealink International

3rd Stage Ronde van de Algarve

1986
1st in General Classification Milk Race

1st Stage 7, Milk Race

4th Amstel Gold Race
1st Stage 5, Ronde van de Algarve
1st Stage 6, Ronde van de Algarve

1987
1st 1st in General Classification Kellogg's Tour of Britain

1st Stage 2, Kellogg's Tour of Britain

1988
3rd Kellogg's Tour of Britain

1st Stage 2, Kellogg's Tour of Britain
