= Tour of Britain Men =

Cycling race

Race details
- Date: September
- Region: Great Britain
- Local name: The Tour
- Discipline: Road
- Competition: UCI Europe Tour (2004–2021); UCI ProSeries (2021–present)
- Type: Stage race
- Organiser: British Cycling
- Web site: www.britishcycling.org.uk/tourofbritain

History
- First edition: 1945
- First winner: Robert Batot (FRA)
- Most recent: Tim Wellens (BEL)

The Tour of Britain is a multi-stage cycling race, conducted on British roads, in which participants race across Great Britain to complete the race in the fastest time.

The event dates back to the first British stage races held just after the Second World War. Since then, various different events have been described as the Tour of Britain, including the Milk Race, the Kellogg's Tour of Britain and the PruTour.

The most recent version of the Tour of Britain began in 2004 as part of the UCI Europe Tour. From 2014, the race was rated 2.HC by the UCI. The race became part of the new UCI ProSeries in 2020.

== Tour of Britain (1945–1999) ==
=== Origins ===
The Tour of Britain has its origins in a dispute between cyclists during the Second World War. The British administrative body, the National Cyclists' Union (NCU), had feared since the 19th century that massed racing on the roads would endanger all racing, including early-morning time trials and, originally, the very place of cyclists on the road.

A race organised from Llangollen to Wolverhampton on 7 June 1942, in defiance of the NCU, led to its organisers and riders being banned. They formed a new body, the British League of Racing Cyclists (BLRC), which wanted not only massed racing but a British version of the Tour de France.

The first multi-day stage race in Britain was the Southern Grand Prix in Kent in August 1944. It was won by Les Plume of Manchester. The first stage was won by Percy Stallard, the organiser of the Llangollen-Wolverhampton race in 1942.

The experience encouraged the BLRC to run a bigger race, the Victory Cycling Marathon, to celebrate the end of the war in 1945. It ran from Brighton to Glasgow in five stages and was won by Robert Batot of France, with Frenchmen taking six of the top 10 places, the mountains competition and best team.

Chas Messenger, a BLRC official and historian, said: "No one had ever put on a stage race in this country, other than the Southern Grand Prix, and even fewer people had even seen one. So raw were they that Jimmy Kain (the organiser) even wrote to the Auto-Cycle Union – the body for motorcycle racing – and the flags used by them were taken as a guide to what was needed. Kain recalled the precarious budget: "£44 entry fees and £130 of my own money and £16 when I went round with the hat after the Bradford stage."

The writer Roger St Pierre said:

"It was reported that 20,000 watched the start but I've seen a picture which would indicate it was probably three or four times that number. What outsiders didn't see though was just what a ramshackle affair it all was, with riders finishing stages often miles longer than billed then having to find a bed for the night – with the poorer riders ending up spending the night huddled in barns, haylofts or even under the hedgerows."

The BLRC was not recognised by the world governing body, the Union Cycliste Internationale and so it recruited its French riders from another rebel organisation, the communist Fédération Sportive et Gymnastique du Travail, using French café-owners in Soho, London, as their link.

=== Sponsors and politics ===
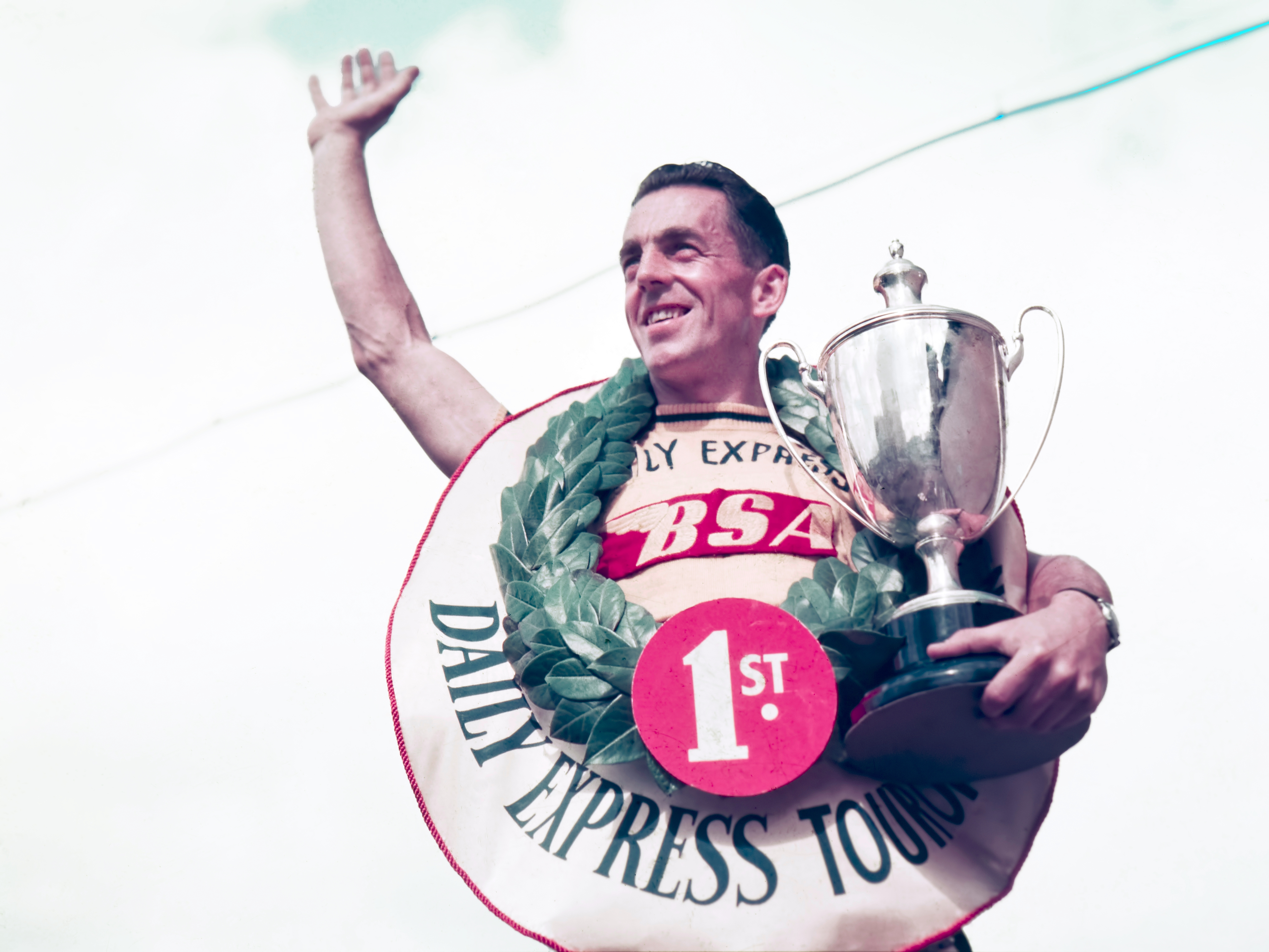
Gordon Thomas receiving the 1953 Tour of Britain cup

The Victory Cycling Marathon was run on what little money the BLRC could raise. Riders stayed in cheap boarding houses and officials used their own cars. In 1947, the News of the World gave £500 to the race, by then called Brighton-Glasgow. Within a year it pulled out again, concerned by the internal arguments that had bedevilled the BLRC from the start. The 1950 race was sponsored by Sporting Record, another newspaper, followed by the Daily Express in 1951.

The cycling official John Dennis said in 2002:

"The most effective sponsor of the Tour of Britain (the Daily Express) was lost as a result of the constant bickering between rival officials and organisations. I was the press officer to the Express publicity director, Albert Asher, and saw it all happen. He was upset by the petty disagreements and decided to support the new Formula 1 motor-racing instead."

Sponsorship was taken up by the makers of Quaker Oats in 1954, and then in 1958 by the Milk Marketing Board.

=== The Milk Race ===
The Milk Marketing Board (MMB) was a sales monopoly for dairy farmers in England and Wales. A semi-professional cyclist from Derby, Dave Orford, asked the MMB to pay for "Drink more milk" to be embroidered on the jersey of every semi-professional, or independent, rider in the country. The MMB could then advertise that races had been won because of the properties of milk and the winner would receive a £10 bonus as a result.

Orford met the MMB's publicity officer, Reg Pugh, at the board's headquarters in Thames Ditton, west of London. Orford said: "At the end of the discussion he stated that the MMB would prefer to sponsor a major international marathon. So the Milk Race, the Tour of Britain, was born, starting in 1958 and lasting for 35 years, the longest cycle sponsorship in the UK ever." A tie-in video game, Milk Race, was released in 1987.

The first two races were open to semi-professionals but from 1960 until 1984 it was open only to amateurs. From 1985 until 1993 it was open to both amateurs and professionals. The Milk Race ended in 1993 because the MMB was wound up with the passing of the UK's Agriculture Act 1993.

In May 2013 the Milk Race name was revived for an annual one-day criterium in Nottingham, with elite men's and women's races. The event is organised by Race Director Tony Doyle and sponsored by the Dairy Council and the Milk Marketing Forum.

=== Kellogg's Tour and PruTour ===
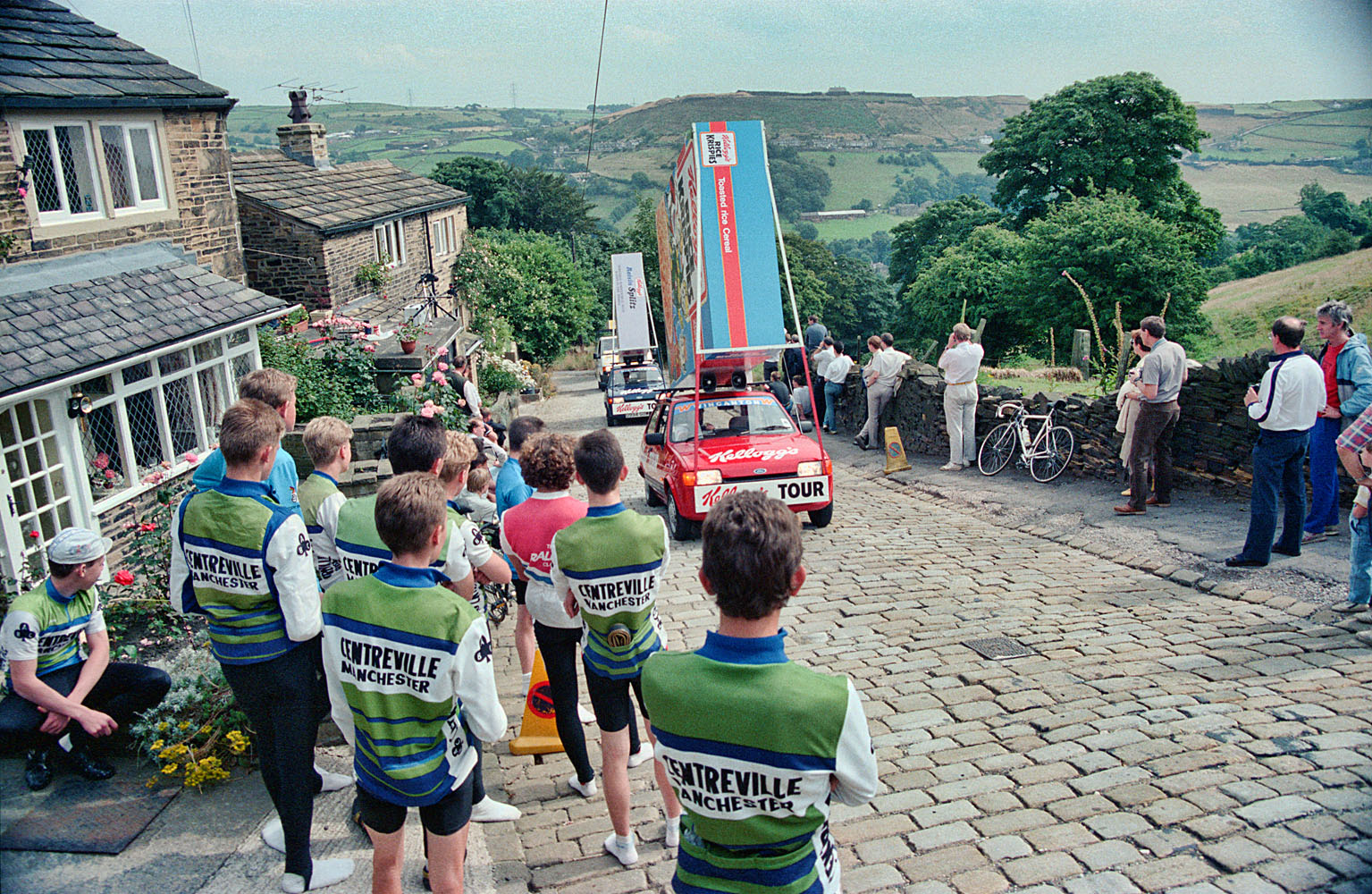
The caravane before the race passed near Halifax

The professional Kellogg's Tour of Britain ran for eight editions from 1987 to 1994. This tour, particularly in its early years, was characterised by very long hilly stages, a typical example being the Newcastle upon Tyne to Manchester stage via the Yorkshire Dales in the 1987 event. The Prudential plc-sponsored PruTour (1998–1999) ran twice. Concerns about safety during the races contributed to both events' demise through the withdrawal of sponsorship; in the case of the Kellogg's Tour this followed a member of the public driving head-on into the peloton in the Lake District, and in the case of the PruTour a police motorcyclist being killed in a collision with a motorist near Worcester.

=== Winners ===
Year	Race name	Rider status	Winner	Team/Country
1945	Victory Marathon	amateur	Robert Batot	France
1946	Brighton-Glasgow	am-ind	Mike Peers	Manchester
1947	Brighton-Glasgow	am-ind	George Kessock	Paris Cycles
1948	Brighton-Glasgow	am-ind	Tom Saunders	Dayton Cycles
1949	Brighton-Glasgow	am-ind	Geoff Clark	ITP
1950	Brighton-Glasgow	am-ind	George Lander	Fréjus Cycles
1951	Butlin Tour	amateur	Stan Blair	England
1951	Brighton-Glasgow	amateur	Ian Greenfield	Comet CC
1951	Tour of Britain	am-ind	Ian Steel	Viking Cycles
1952	Brighton-Glasgow	amateur	Bill Bellamy	Romford CC
1952	Tour of Britain	am-pro	Ken Russell	Ellis Briggs
1953	Brighton-Newcastle	amateur	Frank Edwards	Norfolk Olympic
1953	Tour of Britain	am-ind	Gordon Thomas	BSA
1954	Circuit of Britain	amateur	Viv Bailes	Teesside
1954	Tour of Britain	am-ind	Eugène Tambourlini	France
1955	Circuit of Britain	amateur	Des Robinson	Yorkshire
1955	Tour of Britain	am-ind	Tony Hewson	Sheffield
1956	Circuit of Britain	amateur	Dick McNeil	North-east
1958	Milk Race	am-ind	Richard Durlacher	Austria
1959	Milk Race	am-ind	Bill Bradley	England
1960	Milk Race	amateur	Bill Bradley	England
1961	Milk Race	amateur	Billy Holmes	England
1962	Milk Race	amateur	Eugen Pokorny	Poland
1963	Milk Race	amateur	Pete Chisman	England
1964	Milk Race	amateur	Arthur Metcalfe	England
1965	Milk Race	amateur	Les West	Midlands
1966	Milk Race	amateur	Józef Gawliczek	Poland
1967	Milk Race	amateur	Les West	Britain
1968	Milk Race	amateur	Gösta Pettersson	Sweden
1969	Milk Race	amateur	Fedor den Hertog	Netherlands
1970	Milk Race	amateur	Jiří Mainuš	Czechoslovakia
1971	Milk Race	amateur	Fedor den Hertog	Netherlands
1972	Milk Race	amateur	Hennie Kuiper	Netherlands
1973	Milk Race	amateur	Piet van Katwijk	Netherlands
1974	Milk Race	amateur	Roy Schuiten	Netherlands
1975	Milk Race	amateur	Bernt Johansson	Sweden
1976	Milk Race	amateur	Bill Nickson	Britain
1977	Milk Race	amateur	Said Gusseinov	USSR
1978	Milk Race	amateur	Jan Brzeźny	Poland
1979	Milk Race	amateur	Yuri Kashirin	USSR
1980	Milk Race	amateur	Ivan Mitchenko	USSR
1981	Milk Race	amateur	Sergei Krivosheev	USSR
1982	Milk Race	amateur	Yuri Kashirin	USSR
1983	Milk Race	amateur	Matt Eaton	USA
1984	Milk Race	amateur	Oleg Czougeda	USSR
1985	Milk Race	pro-am	Eric van Lancker	Fangio
1986	Milk Race	pro-am	Joey McLoughlin	ANC
1987	Milk Race	pro-am	Malcolm Elliott	ANC
1987	Kellogg's Tour	pro	Joey McLoughlin	ANC
1988	Milk Race	pro-am	Vasily Zhdanov	USSR
1988	Kellogg's Tour	pro	Malcolm Elliott	Fagor
1989	Milk Race	pro-am	Brian Walton	7-Eleven
1989	Kellogg's Tour	pro	Robert Millar	Z–Peugeot
1990	Milk Race	pro-am	Shane Sutton	Banana
1990	Kellogg's Tour	pro	Michel Dernies	Weinnmann-SMM
1991	Milk Race	pro-am	Chris Walker	Banana
1991	Kellogg's Tour	pro	Phil Anderson	Motorola
1992	Milk Race	pro-am	Conor Henry	Ireland
1992	Kellogg's Tour	pro	Max Sciandri	Motorola
1993	Milk Race	pro-am	Chris Lillywhite	Banana
1993	Kellogg's Tour	pro	Phil Anderson	Motorola
1994	Kellogg's Tour	pro	Maurizio Fondriest	Lampre
1998	PruTour	pro	Stuart O'Grady	Crédit Agricole
1999	PruTour	pro	Marc Wauters	Rabobank

== Tour of Britain (2004–present) ==
After a five-year hiatus, the Tour of Britain returned in 2004. It began as a five-stage race before increasing to six days in 2005, seven in 2007 and eventually an eight-stage race in 2008. It is a professional men's race, typically attracting between 10 and 12 UCI WorldTeams, as well as a handful of UCI ProTeams, four British-registered UCI Continental Teams and a Great Britain national squad which often comprises riders from British Cycling's Senior Academy programme.

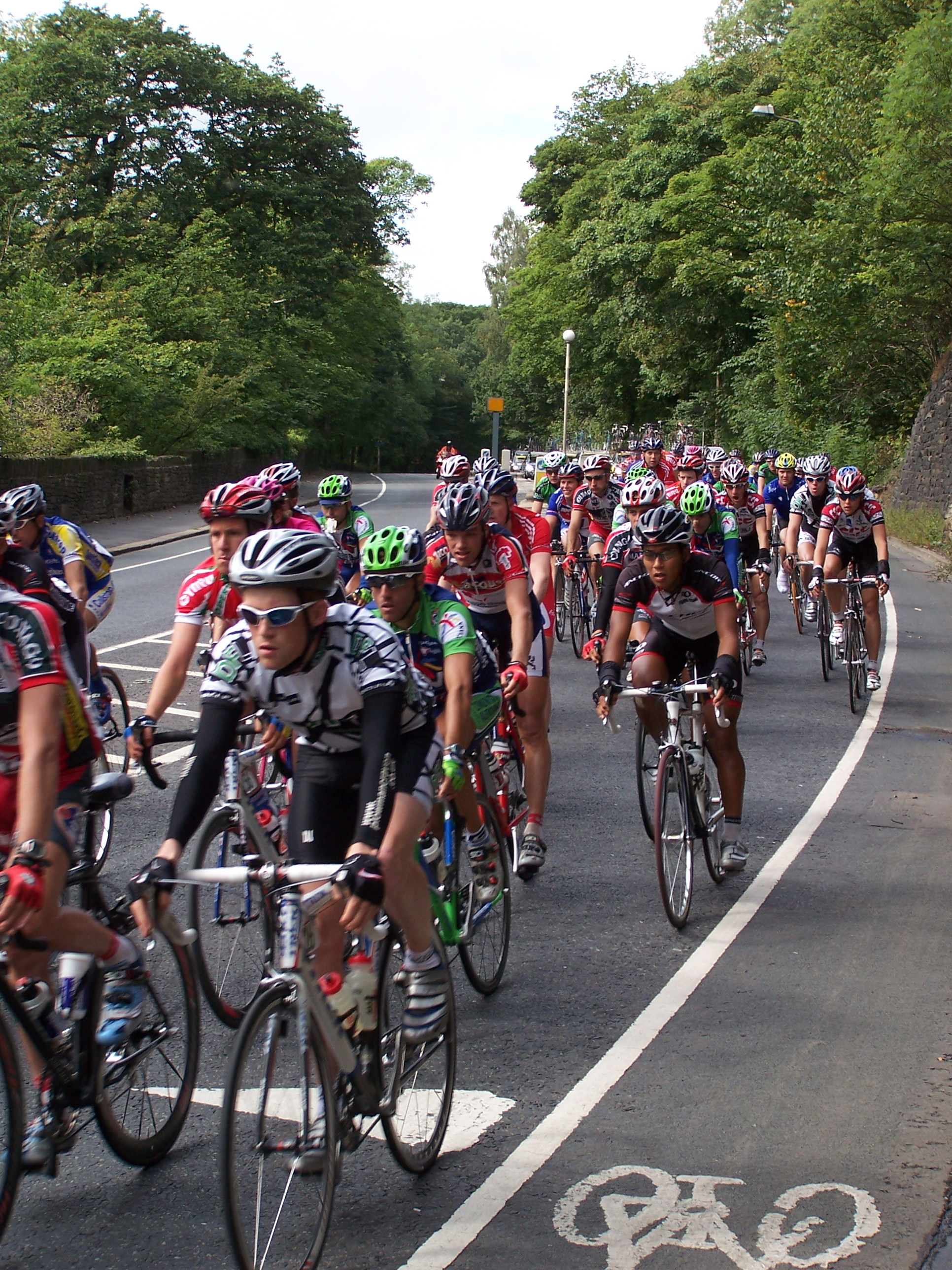
Stage 3 of the 2005 race passing through Honley, near Huddersfield

=== Winners ===
Year	Country	Rider	Team
2004	Colombia	Mauricio Ardila	Chocolade Jacques-Wincor Nixdorf
2005	Belgium	Nick Nuyens	Quick-Step–Innergetic
2006	Denmark	Martin Pedersen	Team CSC
2007	France	Romain Feillu	Agritubel
2008	France	Geoffroy Lequatre	Agritubel
2009	Norway	Edvald Boasson Hagen	Team Columbia–HTC
2010	Switzerland	Michael Albasini	Team HTC–Columbia
2011	Netherlands	Lars Boom	Rabobank
2012	Australia	Nathan Haas	Garmin–Sharp
2013	Great Britain	Bradley Wiggins	Team Sky
2014	Netherlands	Dylan van Baarle	Garmin–Sharp
2015	Norway	Edvald Boasson Hagen	MTN–Qhubeka
2016	Great Britain	Steve Cummings	Team Dimension Data
2017	Netherlands	Lars Boom	LottoNL–Jumbo
2018	France	Julian Alaphilippe	Quick-Step Floors
2019	Netherlands	Mathieu van der Poel	Corendon–Circus
2020	No race due to the COVID-19 pandemic.		
2021	Belgium	Wout van Aert	Team Jumbo–Visma
2022	Spain	Gonzalo Serrano	Movistar Team
2023	Belgium	Wout van Aert	Team Jumbo–Visma
2024	Great Britain	Stephen Williams	Israel–Premier Tech
2025	France	Romain Grégoire	Groupama–FDJ
2026	Belgium	Tim Wellens	UAE Team Emirates XRG

=== 2004 ===
The 2004 Tour of Britain was the first edition of the modern incarnation of the race. It took place over five days between Wednesday 1 – Sunday 5 September, organised by Surrey-based SweetSpot Group in collaboration with the BCF (British Cycling Federation). It was the first Tour of Britain to be held since 1999. SweetSpot MD Hugh Roberts and race director Mick Bennett, were behind the event's return, working on the race until 2023.

Sponsored by the Regional Development Agencies, it attracted teams such as T-Mobile and U.S. Postal Service. It was designated a 2.3 category race on the Union Cycliste Internationale (UCI) calendar. Highlights of the event were shown as part of BBC'S Grandstand programme a week after the final stage.

The tour climaxed with a 45 miles (72 km) criterium in London, where an estimated 100,000 spectators saw a long break by Bradley Wiggins last until the penultimate lap, before Enrico Degano of Team Barloworld took the sprint on the line. The Colombian Mauricio Ardila, of Chocolade Jacques, won the General Classification.

=== 2005 ===
The 2005 race was run as a UCI 2.1 category in six stages starting in Glasgow on Tuesday 30 August and finishing in London on Sunday 4 September. British rider Roger Hammond took victory in Blackpool on stage two, becoming the first home rider to win a stage of the modern race. However, the overall title was won by Belgian rider Nick Nuyens, who is only one of two riders to have led the modern race from start to finish.

Future Tour de France champion Geraint Thomas and Mark Cavendish both made their first appearances in the race during the 2005 Tour; Thomas placed 42nd overall, Cavendish (who finished third in Blackpool on stage two and sixth in Nottingham two days later) 84th.

=== 2006 ===
The 2006 Tour of Britain took place from Tuesday 29 August to Sunday 3 September as a UCI category 2.1 event. Martin Pedersen and Andy Schleck of Team CSC won the overall and King of the Mountains classification, respectively. Mark Cavendish (T-Mobile Team) won the points classification and Johan van Summeren (Davitamon–Lotto) the sprints classification. Like Nuyens in 2005, Pedersen topped the overall standings from start to finish. The race's final stage, held between Greenwich Park and The Mall, was televised live on BBC's Grandstand, making it the first and only stage to enjoy such coverage between 2004 and 2011.

=== 2007 ===
The 2007 Tour of Britain was extended to seven days, with the extra day being used to run a stage in Somerset for the first time. Instead of finishing in London, the 2007 race started in London and finished in Glasgow, which used the event to boost its bid to host the 2014 Commonwealth Games. French rider Romain Feillu won overall by just 0.49 seconds over Spaniard (and stage four winner in Bradford) Adrián Palomares. His victory margin remains the smallest in modern race history. Mark Cavendish won the race's opening two stages (a 2.5 km prologue at Crystal Palace Park and in Southampton) as well as the points competition, while Yorkshire's Ben Swift won the mountains competition.

=== 2008 ===
The tour increased by yet another day for 2008, with eight stages scheduled, from Sunday 7 to Sunday 14 September. The race began in London and finished in Liverpool. ITV4 broadcast the race for the first time, with each stage enjoyed hour-long highlight shows presented by Ned Boulting. As per compatriot Romain Feillu in 2007, overall champion Geoffroy Lequatre claimed the victory despite not winning a single stage of the Tour. Italian rider Alessandro Petacchi and future champion Edvald Boasson Hagen both won three stages apiece; Petacchi triumphed in London (stage one), Gateshead (six) and Liverpool (eight), while Boasson Hagen was first across the line in Stoke-on-Trent (stage four), Dalby Forest (five) and Drumlanrig Castle (seven).

=== 2009 ===
The sixth edition, the 2009 Tour of Britain, was also raced over eight days, Saturday 12 to Saturday 19 September. The race started in Scunthorpe and finished in London. Boasson Hagen was the dominant overall winner, claiming a record four-consecutive stage victories (in Peebles, Blackpool, Stoke-on-Trent and Bideford) en route to the title. In his first season as a pro, Katusha–Alpecin rider Ben Swift memorably took his maiden career victory ahead of team-mate Filippo Pozzato in Yeovil.

=== 2010 ===
The 2010 edition of the Tour of Britain was held from Saturday 11 to Saturday 18 September and was won by Michael Albasini. His winning margin of 65 seconds over Slovenian rider Borut Božič is the largest in modern race history. Albasini laid the foundations of his victory by winning in Swansea on stage three; that day's route included two ascents of the city's famed Constitution Hill, a 300-metre cobbled climb that averages a gradient of 19.3%. Team Sky made their race debut in the 2010 Tour, winning stage two in Stoke-on-Trent with New Zealander Greg Henderson. While the race finished in London for the fifth time in seven editions, the 2010 Tour finale took place around ExCeL London owing to a clash with the Pope's visit to London, which meant that the centre of the city was out of bounds to the race on the orders of the police and security services.

=== 2011 ===
The 2011 Tour of Britain was held from Sunday 11 to Sunday 18 September. Stage two, scheduled to take place between Kendal and Carlisle, was cancelled due to bad weather. It remains the only stage of the modern race not to run as planned. The general classification was won by Dutch rider Lars Boom. This edition of the race outlined the event's growing stature on the international cycling calendar, as Thor Hushovd became only the second reigning UCI road world champion to win a stage of the race wearing the iconic Rainbow Jersey when he triumphed in Caerphilly on stage four. Furthermore, Mark Cavendish returned to the race for the first time since the 2007 Tour of Britain less than two months after he won the Points classification in the Tour de France. The Manxman won the opening stage in Dumfries and London circuit race finale; he also set up HTC–Highroad team-mate Mark Renshaw to win in Exmouth on day five.

=== 2012 ===
The 2012 Tour of Britain was held from Sunday 9 to Sunday 16 September. With the British public's interest in cycling high off the back of Bradley Wiggins' victory in that summer's Tour de France and the London 2012 Olympic Games, the final two hours of each stage during the 2012 race were shown live on ITV4 and Eurosport.

Jonathan Tiernan-Locke originally won the event, the first British rider to do so since its relaunch. In 2014, following investigation for biological passport irregularities, Tiernan-Locke was banned for two years and stripped of his 2012 title. The race was retrospectively awarded to Australia's Nathan Haas, riding for the Garmin–Sharp team. Mark Cavendish, in his last race as World Champion, won three stages including the final stage in an uphill sprint up Guildford's cobbled high street. Tour de France 2012 winner, Bradley Wiggins was forced to pull out of the Tour after stage 5, as a result of a stomach bug.

=== 2013 ===
The tenth edition, the 2013 Tour of Britain, took place from Sunday 15 to Sunday 22 September comprising eight stages. Wiggins won in what proved to be Team Sky's only general classification victory in the race, beating IAM Cycling's Martin Elmiger by 26 seconds, having put 54 seconds into the Swiss rider during the stage three individual time trial around Knowsley, Merseyside. The race notably featured its first hill-top finish, which took place upon Haytor, Devon, on stage six. Riding for the Great Britain national team, future Vuelta a España winner Simon Yates – then aged just 21 – took a famous victory.

=== 2014 ===
The eleventh edition, the 2014 Tour of Britain, consisted of eight stages between Sunday 7 and Sunday 14 September. For the first time, it was categorised as a UCI 2.HC race and featured a title sponsor: Friends Life Group. It began in Liverpool and finished in London, with two stage finishes in Wales, three in the west of England, and two in the south-east. The race was won by Dylan van Baarle. German sprinter Marcel Kittel won the stages in Liverpool and London just weeks after he triumphed in two of the three British stages that featured in the 2014 Tour de France; his London victory in the Tour of Britain came on Whitehall, whereas stage three of the 2014 Tour de France finished on The Mall, London. Another British victory looked likely when Essex's Alex Dowsett, riding for the Movistar Team (men's team), moved into the race lead after forming part of a three-man breakaway on stage six between Bath and Hemel Hempstead. However, he lost the lead after the following day's stage between Camberley and Brighton, and went on to finish eighth overall.

=== 2015 ===
Edvald Boasson Hagen made more history at the 2015 Tour of Britain when he became the first rider to win the modern edition for a second time. The 12th edition of the modern race, held between Sunday 6 and Sunday 13 September, was sponsored by Aviva following their acquisition of Friends Life in April 2015. In another first, Anglesey hosted the Grand Départ, becoming the first of Britain's small islands to welcome the Tour. The race visited the cities of Edinburgh (stage four start), Stoke-on-Trent (stage six start) and Nottingham (stage six finish), as well as smaller towns such as Prudhoe and Fakenham. London again hosted the final stage, however the Tour used a new circuit centred around Regent Street and Piccadilly as opposed to its traditional Whitehall loop, versions of which featured in seven editions of the race between 2004 and 2014. German rider André Greipel, riding for Lotto–Soudal was first across the line but was subsequently disqualified for a dangerous sprint. In doing so, he became the first rider to be stripped of a stage win in modern race history; Elia Viviani was awarded the victory to go alongside successes in Wrexham on stage one and Floors Castle on stage three.

=== 2016 ===
The 2016 Tour of Britain, held between Sunday 4 and Sunday 11 September, was won by home rider Steve Cummings, who had previously finished second in 2008 and 2011. The race ran without a title sponsor for the first time since 2013 following the conclusion of a sponsorship agreement with Aviva in June of that year.

Glasgow hosted the race's Grand Départ for the first time in 10 years; as per the 2006 Tour, Castle Douglas also welcomed the first finish of the race, won by André Greipel. Cummings formed the basis of his overall victory by placing second on Kendal's steep Beast Banks climb on stage two, before moving into the race lead after the individual time trial in Bristol on stage 7a (the 2016 race was the third and, at present, last edition to feature a split stage). Team Sky enjoyed a productive week, with Ian Stannard soloing to a memorable victory at Tatton Park and Wout Poels taking victory atop a wind-swept Haytor on stage six. Poels' success followed his win on Hartside Pass in the 2015 race's hill-top finish stage. The 2016 Tour also proved to be the last professional race of Bradley Wiggins' cycling career before he retired from the sport. He placed 105th overall, riding for the eponymous WIGGINS squad.

=== 2017 ===
The 2017 Tour of Britain, which took place between Sunday 3 and Sunday 10 September, was won by Dutch rider Lars Boom. The LottoNL–Jumbo rider's victory saw him become the second rider to win the modern race overall for a second time following Edvald Boasson Hagen's wins in 2009 and 2015.

This edition of the race was sponsored by OVO Energy, the first of three editions that the Bristol-based energy supply company were the title partner of. In another move that emphasised the race's status on the international cycling calendar, ITV4 broadcast each stage live in full for the first time.

=== 2018 ===
Julian Alaphilippe became the first Frenchman to win the Tour of Britain since 2008 when he triumphed in the 2018 edition. Held between Sunday 2 and Sunday 9 September, the 2018 Tour of Britain was watched by over 1.5 million roadside spectators and featured the likes of Chris Froome – his first participation in the event since 2009 – and that year's Tour de France champion Geraint Thomas. Fittingly for Thomas, the race started in Wales, with the other seven stages taking place in England.

Outlining the event's innovative nature, the race's first-ever team time trial stage took place on day five of the Tour. Starting in Cockermouth, the 14 km uphill stage finished at Whinlatter having climbed the western side of the fell. The following day's stage also finished atop Whinlatter, albeit after two ascents of its eastern side.

=== 2019 ===
The 2019 Tour of Britain, the first edition of the race to be run from Saturday to Saturday since 2010 (7 to 14 September), was won by Mathieu van der Poel after a race-long battle with Italian rider Matteo Trentin (Mitchelton–Scott).

Together with compatriot Dylan Groenewegen, van der Poel won three stages of the race, including the Greater Manchester finale on day eight – one that started in Altrincham and visited all 10 boroughs of the metropolitan county before finishing along Deansgate. While the 2019 Tour was the first edition of the race since 2012 that did not visit London, Glasgow and Newcastle both featured along the route.

=== 2020 ===
Scheduled to take place between Sunday 6 and Sunday 13 September, the 2020 Tour of Britain was due to start with its first Cornwall Grand Départ. Aberdeenshire and Aberdeen were to host the final stage, marking the furthest point north the race would have visited. The race would have formed part of the UCI ProSeries, comprising the second tier of the men's elite road cycling events, launched by the sport's governing body for 2020. In May 2020, the 2020 edition was cancelled due to the COVID-19 pandemic. The 2021 Tour of Britain followed the route scheduled for the 2020 edition.

=== 2021 ===
The men's Tour of Britain race returned to its usual September format after the previous year's cancellation due to the COVID-19 pandemic. The race started on 5 September in Penzance, Cornwall, and finished on 12 September in Aberdeen, Scotland.

=== 2022 ===
The race returned to Yorkshire for the first time since 2009 and was scheduled to pass through Dorset for the first time. The final three stages were cancelled, and the race declared completed, due to the death of Elizabeth II.

=== 2023 ===
The 2023 race began in Manchester on 3 September and finished in Caerphilly on Sunday 10 September.

=== 2024 ===
In late 2023, British Cycling terminated its agreement with race organiser and promoter SweetSpot due to a financial dispute; it was reported that SweetSpot was alleged to owe British Cycling £700,000 in unpaid licencing fees. In January 2024, SweetSpot entered liquidation, and the race was removed from the 2024 calendar. In February, British Cycling stated its intention to take on the organisation of both the Tour of Britain and the Women's Tour, which was renamed to the Tour of Britain Women. Both Tours were eventually re-added to the UCI calendar. Although British Cycling initially intended the 2024 Tour of Britain Men to consist of eight stages, it was reduced to six, with the intention being also to extend the Tour of Britain Women to six stages in 2025, equalising the men's and women's tours. In May, Lloyds Bank agreed with British Cycling to become title partner of both the men's and women's Tours, a deal reportedly worth around £20 million over five years.

The 2024 edition began in Kelso, Scottish Borders, on Tuesday 3 September, and concluded in Felixstowe, Suffolk on Sunday 8 September. The men's tour was won by Stevie Williams.

=== 2025 ===
The 2025 edition started on Tuesday 2 September in Woodbridge, Suffolk, and finished on Sunday 7 September in Cardiff. Romain Grégoire (Groupama–FDJ) won the general classification, with Olav Kooij (Visma–Lease a Bike) taking three stage wins. The race was notable for being the last professional race of Geraint Thomas; the final stage ended in his hometown, Cardiff.

=== 2026 ===
For 2026, the race will contract in length to five days from six, becoming equivalent to the women's event. The women's race will run from 19 August to 23 August while the men's race will run from 2 September to 6 September. In March former rider Jonny Clay was announced as the new race director, taking over from Rod Ellingworth.

== See also ==
- Tour de Yorkshire
