= British National Road Race Championships =

Cycling competition

Race details
- Date: June
- Region: Great Britain
- Discipline: Road race
- Type: One-day
- Web site: www.nationalroadchamps.co.uk

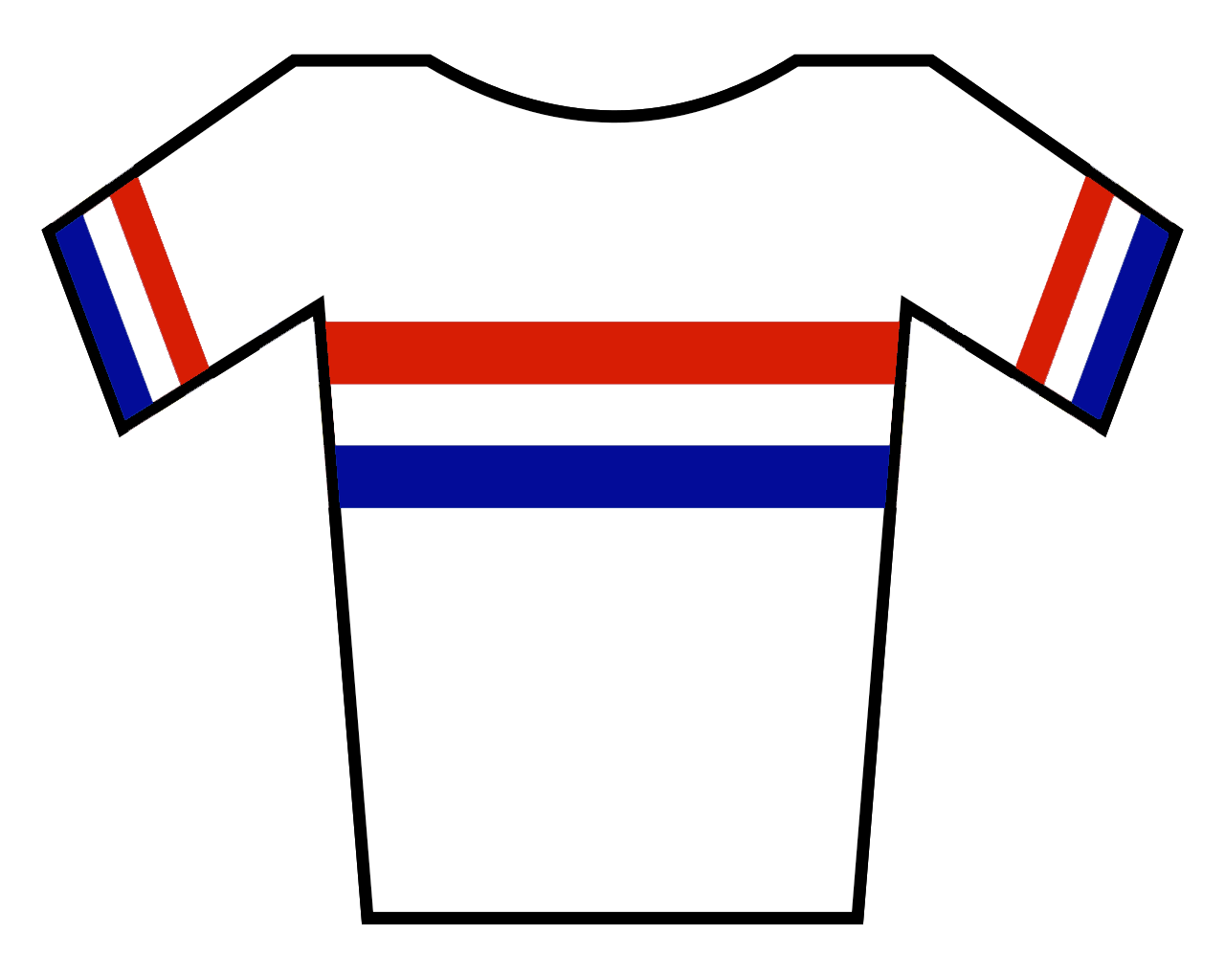
The Champion's Jersey

The British National Road Race Championships cover different categories of British road bicycle racing events, normally held annually.

== History ==
Between 1943 and 1958, two separate bodies – the British League of Racing Cyclists (BLRC) and the National Cyclists' Union (NCU) – ran championships in competition with each other. Between 1946 and 1958 the BLRC's championships were split into two, an amateur race and the independent championship for semi-professional riders.

Women's championships were introduced by the BLRC in 1947, and by the NCU in 1956. In 1959, the NCU and the BLRC merged to create the British Cycling Federation.

Separate amateur and professional men's championships were held from 1959 until 1995. In recent years the under 23 and senior races have been combined, which has caused some confusion in the interpretation of UCI rules.

== Jersey ==
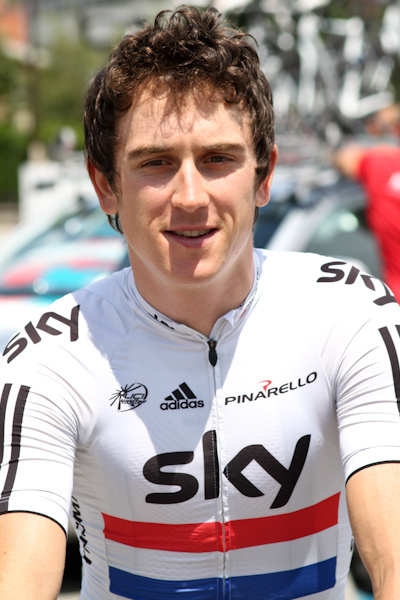
Geraint Thomas wearing the National Champions jersey in 2011

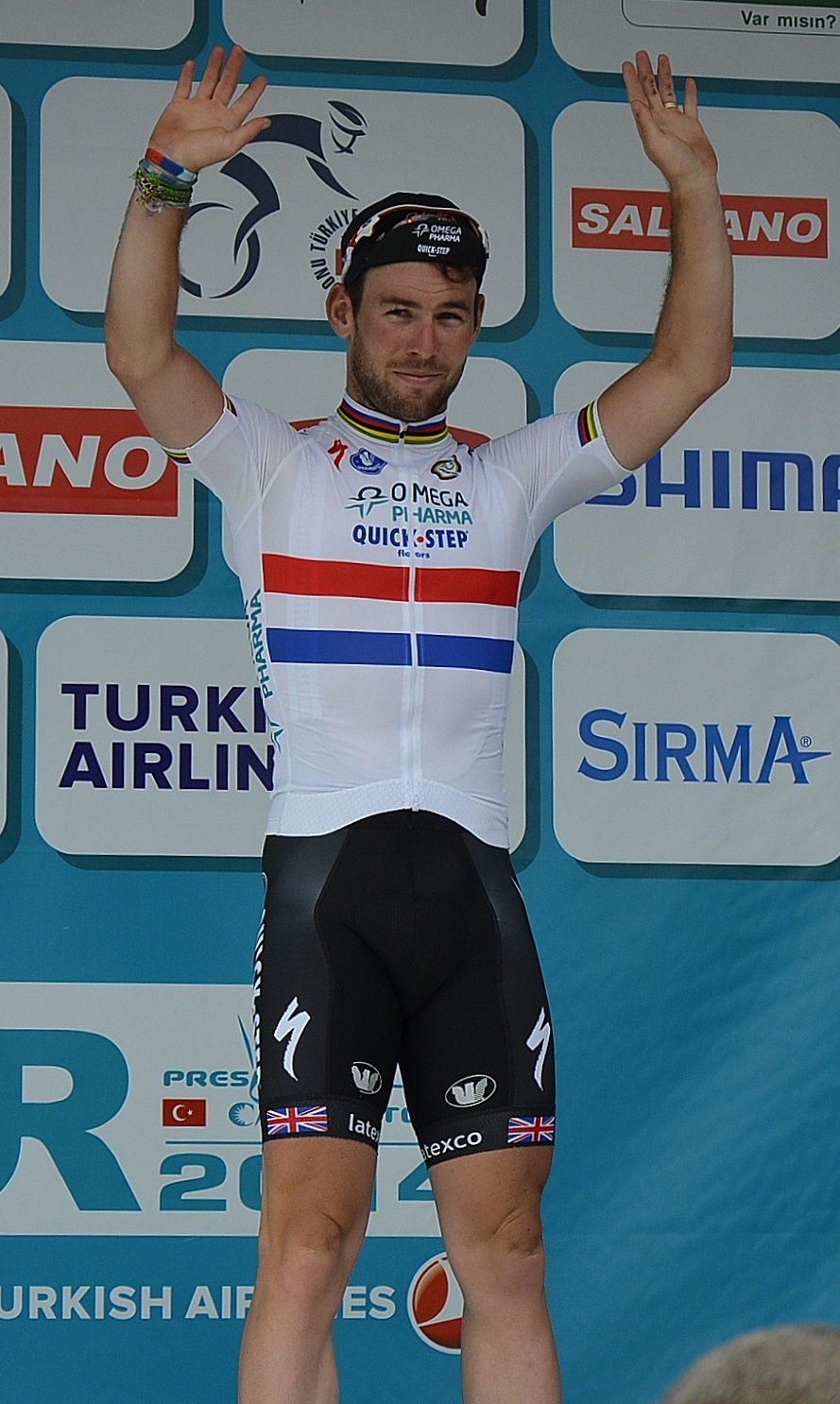
Mark Cavendish wearing the National Champion's Jersey in 2014

The winner of the road race gets to wear the National Champions jersey, which is white with red and blue bands, in races so that they can be identified.

== Men ==
=== Open era (1996–present) ===
Year	Gold	Silver	Bronze
1996	Dave Rand	Andy Naylor	David Cook
1997	Jeremy Hunt	Mark Walsham	Matt Stephens
1998	Matt Stephens	Roger Hammond	Darren Barclay
1999	John Tanner	Kevin Dawson	Russell Downing
2000	John Tanner	Jon Clay	David Millar
2001	Jeremy Hunt	Rob Hayles	John Tanner
2002	Julian Winn	Tom Southam	Jeremy Hunt
2003	Roger Hammond	Jeremy Hunt	Jamie Alberts
2004	Roger Hammond	Tom Southam	Jeremy Hunt
2005	Russell Downing	Steve Cummings	Yanto Barker
2006	Hamish Haynes	Roger Hammond	Geraint Thomas
2007	David Millar	Daniel Lloyd	Hamish Haynes
2008	Rob Hayles	Peter Kennaugh	Dean Downing
2009	Kristian House	Daniel Lloyd	Peter Kennaugh
2010	Geraint Thomas	Peter Kennaugh	Ian Stannard
2011	Bradley Wiggins	Geraint Thomas	Ryan Odell
2012	Ian Stannard	Alex Dowsett	Russell Hampton
2013	Mark Cavendish	Ian Stannard	David Millar
2014	Peter Kennaugh	Ben Swift	Simon Yates
2015	Peter Kennaugh	Mark Cavendish	Ian Stannard
2016	Adam Blythe	Mark Cavendish	Andy Fenn
2017	Steve Cummings	Chris Lawless	Ian Bibby
2018	Connor Swift	Adam Blythe	Owain Doull
2019	Ben Swift	Ian Stannard	John Archibald
2020	Cancelled due to the COVID-19 pandemic in the United Kingdom		
2021	Ben Swift	Fred Wright	Ethan Hayter
2022	Mark Cavendish	Samuel Watson	Alexandar Richardson
2023	Fred Wright	James Knox	Stephen Williams
2024	Ethan Hayter	Lewis Askey	Max Walker
2025	Samuel Watson	Matthew Brennan	Ethan Vernon
2026	Fred Wright	Lewis Askey	Connor Swift

=== Professional (1959–1995) ===
Year	Gold	Silver	Bronze	ref
1959	Ron Coe	Owen Blower	John Geddes	
1960	Not held			
1961	Dave Bedwell	Tony Mills	Ron Jowers	
1962	John Harvey	Dave Bedwell	Ged Coles	
1963	Albert Hitchen	Ken Nuttall	Alan Jacob	
1964	Keith Butler	Albert Hitchen	Ged Coles	
1965	Albert Hitchen	Mick Coupe	Keith Butler	
1966	Richard Goodman	Bernard Burns	Roger Newton	
1967	Colin Lewis	Peter Hill	Arthur Metcalfe	
1968	Colin Lewis	John Aslin	Reg Smith	
1969	Bill Lawrie	Dave Nie	Mick Cowley	
1970	Les West	Brian Jolly	Colin Lewis	
1971	Danny Horton	Sid Barras	Albert Hitchen	
1972	Gary Crewe	Les West	Derek Harrison	
1973	Brian Jolly	Les West	Billy Bilsland	
1975	Les West	Keith Lambert	Danny Horton	
1976	Geoff Wiles	Sid Barras	Phil Corley	
1977	Phil Edwards	Paul Medhurst	Geoff Wiles	
1978	Phil Corley	William Nickson	Reg Smith	
1979	Sid Barras	Barry Hoban	Dudley Hayton	
1980	Keith Lambert	William Nickson	Dudley Hayton	
1981	William Nickson	Nigel Dean	Graham Jones	
1982	John Herety	Sean Yates	William Nickson	
1983	Phil Thomas	Keith Lambert	Mick Morrison	
1984	Steve Joughin	William Nickson	Malcolm Elliott	
1985	Ian Banbury	Dudley Hayton	Mark Bell	
1986	Mark Bell	Adrian Timmis	Steve Joughin	
1987	Paul Sherwen	John Herety	Jack Kershaw	
1988	Steve Joughin	Nick Barnes	Chris Lillywhite	
1989	Tim Harris	Mark Walsham	Nick Barnes	
1990	Colin Sturgess	Ben Luckwell	Harry Lodge	
1991	Brian Smith	Keith Reynolds	Dave Rayner	
1992	Sean Yates	Brian Smith	Chris Walker	
1993	Malcolm Elliott	Brian Smith	Shane Sutton	
1994	Brian Smith	Malcolm Elliott	Mark Walsham	
1995	Robert Millar	Chris Walker	Chris Lillywhite	

=== Amateur (1959–1995) ===
Year	Gold	Silver	Bronze
1959	Bill Baty	Bill Bradley	Johnny Pound
1960	Bill Bradley	Alan Ramsbottom	Jim Hinds
1961	Bill Bradley	George Bennett	Keith Butler
1962	Keith Butler	Dick Goodman	Wes Mason
1963	Bob Addy	John Clarey	Billy Perkins
1964	Peter Gordon	Mick Shea	John Clarey
1965	Les West	Arthur Metcalfe	Colin Lewis
1966	Arthur Metcalfe	Mick Cowley	John Bettinson
1967	Les West	Peter Buckley	Graham Webb
1968	Pete Matthews	Les West	Dave Rollinson
1969	Brian Jolly	Brian Tadman	Pete Matthews
1970	Dave Rollinson	Gary Crewe	Pete Matthews
1971	Dave Rollinson	Phil Bayton	Phil Cheetham
1972	Doug Dailey	Phil Griffiths	Ian Hallam
1973	Grant Thomas	Dave Vose	Dave Mitchell
1974	William Nickson	Willie Moore	Ian Hallam
1975	Kevin Apter	Phil Griffiths	Paul Carbutt
1976	Doug Dailey	William Nickson	Phil Griffiths
1977	Steve Lawrence	Paul Sherwen	Dave Cumming
1978	Robert Millar	Steve Lawrence	Des Fretwell
1979	Robert Millar	Joseph Waugh	Mark Bell
1980	Steve Lawrence	Neil Martin	John Herety
1981	Mark Bell	Steve Poulter	Peter Longbottom
1982	Jeff Williams	Pete Sanders	Steve Joughin
1983	John Cavanagh	Chris White	Gary Sadler
1984	Neil Martin	Peter Longbottom	Joey McLoughlin
1985	Paul Watson	Jeff Williams	Paul Curran
1986	Deno Davie	Jon Clay	Steve Wakefield
1987	Paul Curran	Gary Baker	Terry Sweeney
1988	Neil Hoban	Gary Barker	Phil Bateman
1989	David Cook	Wayne Randle	Steve Farrell
1990	Simeon Hempsall	John Hughes	Gethin Butler
1991	John Hughes	Dave Spencer	Simeon Hempsall
1992	Simon Bray	Steve Farrell	Paul Curran
1993	Rob Harris	Matt Stephens	Mark McKay
1994	Rob Harris	Jeremy Hunt	Mark Lovatt
1995	Simon Bray	Jeremy Hunt	Paul Curran

=== BLRC ===
==== BLRC Independent Road Race (1946–1958) ====
Year	Gold	Silver	Bronze
1946	A H Clarke		
1947	Dennis Jaggard	Benny Whitmore	Arthur Bailey
1948	Harold Johnson	Johnny Raines	Ted Jones
1949	Bob Thom	Leonard West	Mike Peers
1950	Leonard West	Ted Jones	Ken Russell
1951	Dave Bedwell	Leslie Scales	Bob Thom
1952	Ian Steel	Bob Maitland	= Gordon Thomas = Leslie Scales
1953	Bob Maitland	Ian Steel	= Gordon Thomas = Ken Jowett
1954	Arthur Ilsley	Freddie Krebs	Bob Maitland
1955	Graham Vines	Bob Maitland	Ken Russell
1956	Not held		
1957	Ron Coe	Richard Baltrop	Brian Haskell
1958	Ron Coe	Brian Haskell	Tom Oldfield

==== BLRC (1943–1958) ====
Year	Gold	Silver	Bronze
1943	Ernie Clements	Dick Boyden	Len Hook
1944	Percy Stallard	Ernie Clements	Ron Kitching
1945	Ernie Clements	Karl Bloomfield	Dick Boyden
1946	George Edwards	Geoff Clark	Mike Peers
1947	E I Upton	Ron Baker	H Poole
1948	R C Ashwin	Dennis Talbot	Ralph Parkin
1949	Dave Bedwell	W Llewellyn	R Taylor
1950	Ralph Parkin	Eric Artis	Stan Blair
1951	Charlie Bland	Michael Varley	Chris Hooper
1952	Mike Howarth	Ralph Parkin	Anthony Smith
1953	Derek Evans	Don Wilson	Johnny Hibell
1954	Reg Browne	Jim Turner	J Dunn
1955	Desmond Robinson	John Andrews	Gil Taylor
1956	Mike England	Tony Hewson	Brian Haskell
1957	Charlie Mather	Peter Southart	Len Morris
1958	Bill Baty	Norman Baty	Bob Thorpe

=== NCU (1938–1958) ===
Year	Gold	Silver	Bronze
1938	Jack Holmes	Jack Fancourt	John Gavin Bone
1939	Jack Fancourt	Percy Stallard	Jack Holmes
1944	R K Braddick	Dick Bowes	Bob Maitland
1945	J. A. O'Driscoll	A J Hunt	D Moreton
1946	Ernie Clements	Jerry Waters	Bob Maitland
1947	Alex Taylor	S Gasgoine	J Hood
1948	Bob Maitland	Ernie Clements	Ian Scott
1949	A D Newman	J Simpson	Bob Maitland
1950	Gordon Thomas	Les Willmott	Peter Procter
1951	Peter Procter	Dicky Bowes	Graham Vines
1952	Graham Vines	A W S Ashmore	Dicky Bowes
1953	Ted Gerrard	Bernard Pusey	Fred Krebs
1954	B J Sandy	Harry Hardcastle	Karl Gough
1955	Bernard King	Des Robinson	Don Sanderson
1956	Alan Jackson	Stan Brittain	Harry Reynolds
1957 Ind	Ron Coe	Bob Maitland	Brian Heskell
1957 Am	Stan Brittain	Johnny Pound	Ted Gerrard
1958	Bill Seggar	Jim Grieves	Ray Booty

=== Under 23 ===
Year	Gold	Silver	Bronze
1996	Paul Manning	Danny Axford	Steve Higgins
1997	Huw Pritchard	Russell Downing	Phil West
1998	Richard Hobby	Darrell Stile	Gregg Imlah
1999	Charly Wegelius	Matthew Pryce	Justin 'Chipper' Hoy
2000	Neil Swithenbank	Robin Sharman	Tom Anderson
2001	James Shaw	Ian Wilkinson	Andrew Parsons
2002	Jamie Alberts	Mark Kelly	James Barnes
2003	Kieran Page	Russel Anderson	Leigh Cowell
2004	Daniel Fleeman	Richard Whitehorn	Ben Greenwood
2005	Ben Greenwood	Alex Coutts	Adam Illingworth
2006	Peter Bissell	James Spragg	Alistair Stoddart
2007	Rob Partridge	Daniel Shand	Mark Thwaites
2008	Peter Kennaugh	Andy Tennant	Jonathan Bellis
2009	Peter Kennaugh	James Cox	
2010	Andrew Fenn	Rhys Lloyd	Ross Creber
2011	Scott Thwaites	Andrew Fenn	Erick Rowsell
2012	Michael Cuming	Matthew Holmes	Joshua Edmondson
2013	Simon Yates	Owain Doull	Tom Moses
2014	Ed Laverack	Dan Pearson	Dante Carpenter
2015	Owain Doull	Sam Lowe	Matthew Gibson
2016	Tao Geoghegan Hart	Chris Lawless	James Shaw
2017	Chris Lawless	Scott Davies	N/A
2018	Robert Scott	Fred Wright	Gabriel Cullaigh
2019	Ethan Hayter	Matthew Bostock	Jake Stewart
2020	Cancelled due to the COVID-19 pandemic in the United Kingdom		
2021	Fred Wright	Lewis Askey	Leo Hayter
2022	Samuel Watson	Lewis Askey	Jim Brown
2023	Samuel Watson	Joshua Golliker	Max Walker
2024	Bob Donaldson	Josh Tarling	Joseph Blackmore
2025	Matthew Brennan	Callum Thornley	Alex Beldon

=== Junior (Under 18) ===
Year	Gold	Silver	Bronze
1951	Tony Hewson	Arnold Parr	Don Sanderson
1952	Gino Wright	W. Routledge	B. Stevens
1953 NCU	Harry Reynolds	Pete Kemp	Alan Bladon
1953 BLRC	R. Taylor	Reg Browne	Frank Beattie
1954 NCU	Don Smith	Mike Bailey	D.J. Hunt
1954 BLRC	N. Blackshaw	Brian Richards	N. Wilkinson
1955 NCU	Dennis Tarr	Dave Edmunds	Bernard Start
1955 BLRC	J. Parker	A. Copsey	Alf Howling
1956 NCU	Stan Praill	L. Wesley	Brian Dacey
1956 BLRC	John Willman	A. Green	Barry Spence
1957 NCU	Alf Engers	Jim George	Ken Haddon
1957 BLRC	Roy Clements	Alf Engers	C. Blacksley
1958	Johnny Goodrum	George Halls	Harry Jackson
1959	Jim Ridler	Roger Gray	D. Jackson
1960	Ken Wilson	Derek Harrison	J McGrail
1961	Ken Wilson	J. McGrail	George Drewell
1962	Roy Hempsall	Stuart Carter	D. Rostron
1963	Len Oliver	Anthony Ashton	Gordon Smith
1964	Gerry Waterhouse	Nigel Dean	Danny Horton
1965	Nigel Dean	David Garlick	Alan Topp
1966	Don Parry	Ian Hallam	Graham Moore
1967	Phil Edwards	Tim Hookins	Paul Bennet
1968	Chris Dodd	Graham Owen	Charlie Moody
1969	Alan Upcraft	Colin Browning	Kevin Apter
1970	Steve Heffernan	Robert Chadwick	John Bloor
1971	Rik Evans	Fred Strevens	Richard Edwards
1972	Dave Pitman	Roy Irwin	Steve Fleetwood
1973	Brian Ellis	Peter DeLongville	Dave Baronowski
1974	Ray Pugh	Max Grant	Les Fleetwood
1975	Ian Banbury	John Kettell	Glen Mitchell
1976	Ian Leckenby	Neil Howarth	Chris Nowell
1977	Steve Joughin	John Morstead	Nick Martin
1978	Russell Williams	Jeff Hooper	Steve Moss
1979	Glenn Taylor	Steve Moss	Mark Walsham
1980	Daniel Westbury	Piers Hewitt	Gerry Taylor
1981	Ian Hastings	Andrew Ferry	Stephen Cole
1982	Gary Baker	John Tonks	Gary Coltman
1983	Nigel Simpson	Rob Coull	Dave Williams
1984	Dave Rayner	Bran Smith	Glen Sword
1985	Mick Bragg	Glen Sword	Simon Campbell
1986	Simeon Hempsall	Colin Sturgess	David Johnson
1987	Christopher Roberts	Ian Bryant	Tim Warriner
1988	Scott O'Brien	Paul Barrett	Richard Hughes
1989	Richard Hughes	Mark Dawes	Lee Burns
1990	Matthew Armstrong	Paul Jennings	Steve Calland
1991	Jeremy Hunt	Mark Sinclair	Rob Lyne
1992	Carwyn Nott	Danny Corlett	Shaun O'Neill
1993	James Taylor	Sam Quinn	Darren Tudor
1994	Huw Pritchard	Daniel Fox	Gavin Sellen
1995	Gavin Sellen	Antony Aspell	Andrew Sanders
1996	Gavin Sellen	James Griffths	Neil Jones
1997	Paul Kay	Andrew Jackson	Stephen Joseph
1998	Yanto Barker	Jamie Alberts	Richard Heath
1999	Stephen Cummings	Nils King	Michael Kiss
2000	Kieran Page	Owyn Wallace	Richard Sutcliffe
2001	Peter Johnstone	Kieran Page	Graham Briggs
2002	Steffan Wilson	Richard Bowen	Craig Cooke
2003	Matthew Brammeier	Mark Cavendish	Geraint Thomas
2004	Dan Martin	Andrew Hill	Ian Stannard
2005	Adam Norris	Richard Hepworth	Lewis Atkins
2006	Russell Hampton	Jonathan McEvoy	Peter Kennaugh
2007	Peter Kennaugh	Jonathan McEvoy	Erick Rowsell
2008	Erick Rowsell	Andrew Fenn	Alexander King
2009	George Atkins	Tim Kennaugh	Joe Perrett
2010	Daniel McLay	Owain Doull	Chris Nicholson
2011	Dan Pearson	Jim Lewis	Alex Bottomley
2012	Sam Lowe	Sebastian Bayliss	Jake Kelly
2013	Chris Lawless	Gabriel Cullaigh	Tao Geoghegan Hart
2014	Tristan Robbins	Nathan Draper	Tom Bayliss
2015	Nathan Draper	Robert Scott	Alfie Moses
2016	Jacob Vaughan	Ryan Coulton	Charlie Meredith
2017	Louis Rose-Davies	Tom Pidcock	Oliver Robinson
2018	Ben Tulett	Lewis Askey	Samuel Watson
2019	Oliver Stockwell	Max Walker	Aaron Freeman
2020	Cancelled due to the COVID-19 pandemic in the United Kingdom		
2021	Max Poole	Josh Charlton	Noah Hobbs
2022	Zac Walker	Mattie Dodd	Joseph O'Brien
2023	Finn Mason	Sebastian Grindley	Tomos Pattinson

=== All time men's medal table ===
Updated after 2017 Championships.

Medal table includes only medals achieved in elite (senior) events. Riders with 3 or more medals. (Table Excludes BLRC & NCU wins)

Rider	Gold	Silver	Bronze	Total
Peter Kennaugh	2	2	2	6
Jeremy Hunt	2	1	2	5
William Nickson	1	3	1	5
Roger Hammond	2	2	0	4
Mark Cavendish	2	2	0	4
Brian Smith	2	2	0	4
Keith Lambert	2	2	0	4
Les West	2	2	0	4
Ian Stannard	1	1	2	4
John Tanner	2	0	1	3
David Millar	1	0	2	3
Geraint Thomas	1	1	1	3
Malcom Elliot	1	1	1	3
Steve Joughin	2	0	1	3
Sid Barras	1	2	0	3
Colin Lewis	2	0	1	3
Albert Hitchen	2	1	0	3
Dudley Hayton	0	1	2	3

== Women ==
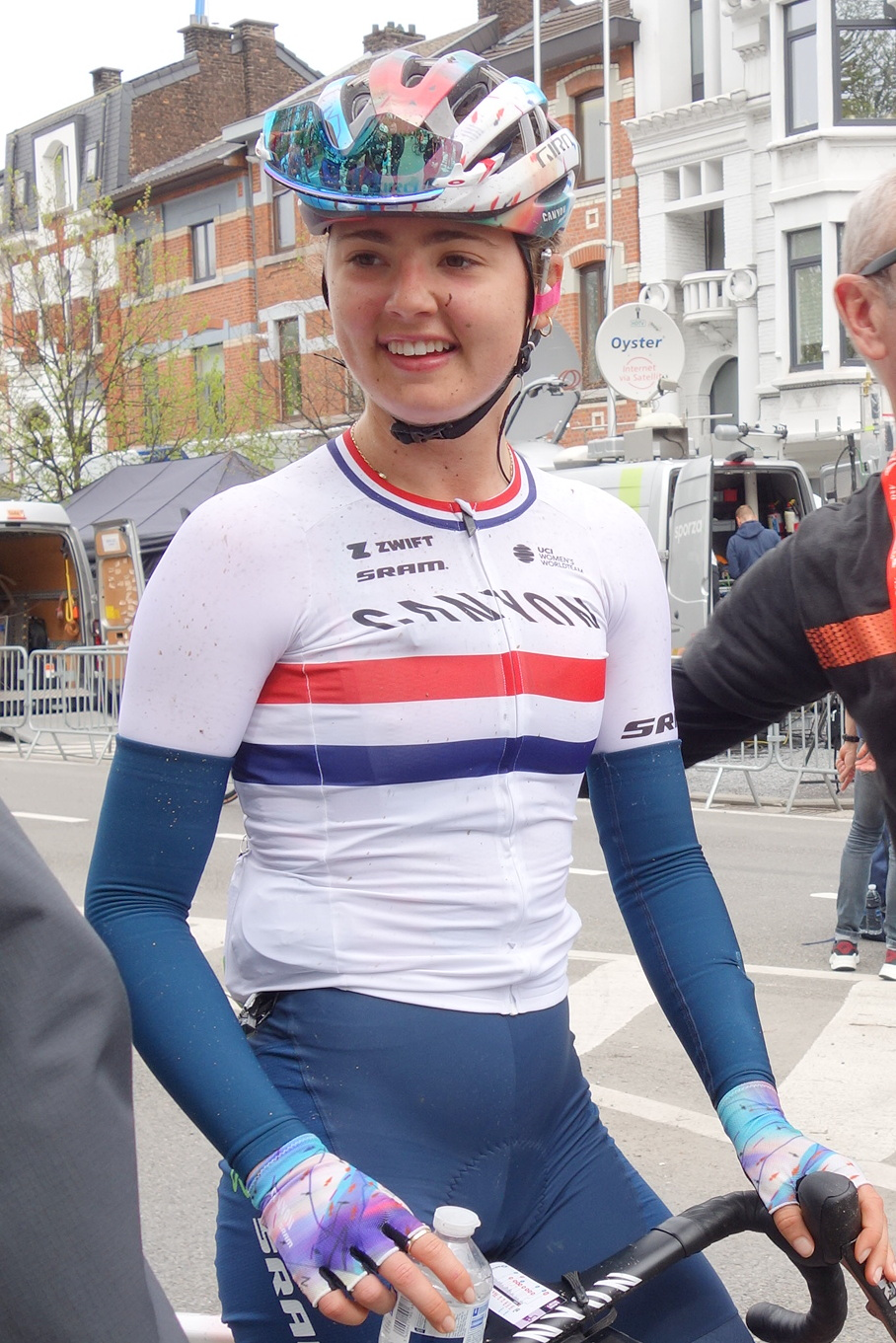
Alice Towers wearing the National Champion jersey in 2023

=== Senior (From 1959) ===
Year	Gold	Silver	Bronze
1959	Beryl Burton	Millie Robinson	Sheila Holmes
1960	Beryl Burton	Sheila Holmes	Val Baxendine
1961	Jo Bowers	Beryl Burton	Jan Smith
1962	Jo Bowers	Pat Pepper	Cynthia Cary
1963	Beryl Burton	Pat Pepper	Jo Bowers
1964	Val Rushworth	Sylvia Beardon	Ann Illingworth
1965	Beryl Burton	Susan Crow	Joan Kershaw
1966	Beryl Burton	Christine Goodfellow	Ann Illingworth
1967	Beryl Burton	Barbara Mapplebeck	Pat Pepper
1968	Beryl Burton	Barbara Mapplebeck	Sylvia Beardon
1969	Ann Horswell	Bernadette Swinnerton	Pat Pepper
1970	Beryl Burton	Joan Kershaw	Brenda Brown
1971	Beryl Burton	Bernadette Swinnerton	Ann Bailey
1972	Beryl Burton	Ann Bailey	Pat Pepper
1973	Beryl Burton	Denise Burton	Christine Goodfellow
1974	Beryl Burton	Carol Barton	Christine Goodfellow
1975	Jayne Westbury	Denise Burton	Catherine Swinnerton
1976	Denise Burton	Beryl Burton	Carol Barton
1977	Catherine Swinnerton	Faith Murray	Josie Randall
1978	Brenda Atkinson	Denise Burton	Catherine Swinnerton
1979	Brenda Atkinson	Catherine Swinnerton	Bernadette Griffiths
1980	Jill Bishop	Julie Earnshaw	Brenda Atkinson
1981	Mandy Jones	Julie Earnshaw	Vicki Thomas
1982	Brenda Atkinson	Catherine Swinnerton	Maria Blower
1983	Mandy Jones	Judith Painter	Linda Gornall
1984	Catherine Swinnerton	Maria Blower	Muriel Sharp
1985	Brenda Tate	Lisa Brambani	Vicki Thomas
1986	Lisa Brambani	Vicki Thomas	Linda Flavell
1987	Lisa Brambani	Sally Hodge	Linda Gornall
1988	Lisa Brambani	Sally Hodge	Maria Blower
1989	Lisa Brambani	Sue Wright	Maria Blower
1990	Marie Purvis	Alison Butler	Maxine Johnson
1991	Marie Purvis	Clare Greenwood	Linda Gornall
1992	Marie Purvis	Sarah Phillips	Clare Greenwood
1993	Marie Purvis	Maxine Johnson	Sarah Phillips
1994	Maxine Johnson	Jenny Kershaw	Sally Boyden
1995	Marie Purvis	Ann Plant	Jenny Kershaw
1996	Maria Lawrence	Ann Plant	Angela Hunter
1997	Maria Lawrence	Isla Rowntree	Angela Hunter
1998	Megan Hughes	Louise Jones	Sally Boyden
1999	Nicole Cooke	Yvonne McGregor	Ceris Gilfillan
2000	Ceris Gilfillan	Caroline Alexander	Yvonne McGregor
2001	Nicole Cooke	Ceris Gilfillan	Sara Symington
2002	Nicole Cooke	Rachel Heal	Melanie Sears
2003	Nicole Cooke	Rachel Heal	Vicki Pincombe
2004	Nicole Cooke	Rachel Heal	Vicki Pincombe
2005	Nicole Cooke	Rachel Heal	Emma Davies
2006	Nicole Cooke	Lorna Webb	Joanna Rowsell
2007	Nicole Cooke	Rachel Heal	Helen Wyman
2008	Nicole Cooke	Emma Pooley	Joanna Rowsell
2009	Nicole Cooke	Lizzie Armitstead	Emma Pooley
2010	Emma Pooley	Lizzie Armitstead	Nicole Cooke
2011	Lizzie Armitstead	Nicole Cooke	Sharon Laws
2012	Sharon Laws	Lizzie Armitstead	Emma Pooley
2013	Lizzie Armitstead	Laura Trott	Dani King
2014	Laura Trott	Dani King	Lizzie Armitstead
2015	Lizzie Armitstead	Alice Barnes	Laura Trott
2016	Hannah Barnes	Alice Barnes	Lucy Garner
2017	Lizzie Deignan	Katie Archibald	Hannah Barnes
2018	Jessica Roberts	Dani Rowe	Ellie Dickinson
2019	Alice Barnes	Anna Henderson	Lizzie Holden
2020	Cancelled due to the COVID-19 pandemic in the United Kingdom		
2021	Pfeiffer Georgi	Josie Nelson	Joss Lowden
2022	Alice Towers	Pfeiffer Georgi	Anna Henderson
2023	Pfeiffer Georgi	Claire Steels	Anna Henderson
2024	Pfeiffer Georgi	Anna Henderson	Lizzie Deignan
2025	Millie Couzens	Pfeiffer Georgi	Anna Henderson
2026	Zoe Bäckstedt	Josie Knight	Millie Couzens

=== NCU (1956–1958) ===
Year	Gold	Silver	Bronze
1955	Millie Robinson		
1956	Millie Robinson		
1957	Shirley Mayers		
1958	Joan Poole	Sheila Clark	Molly Swann

=== BLRC (1947–1958) ===
Year	Gold	Silver	Bronze
1947	Joan Caldwell		
1948	Gwen Clements		
1950	Joyce Burton		
1952	Irene Evans		
1953	June Oliver		
1954	June Thackeray		
1955	Muriel Maitland		
1956	Jacqueline Hewson		
1957	Margaret Pearce		
1958	Cynthia Carey	Pat Dews	Margaret Crawley

=== Under 23 ===
Year	Gold	Silver	Bronze
2007	Nikki Harris	Lizzie Armitstead	Alice Monger-Godfrey
2008	Joanna Rowsell	Jessica Allen	Emma Trott
2009	Lizzie Armitstead	Katie Colclough	Dani King
2010	Lizzie Armitstead	Katie Colclough	Emma Trott
2011	Laura Trott	Lucy Martin	Dani King
2012	Katie Colclough	Penny Rowson	Annie Simpson
2013	Laura Trott	Emma Grant	Elinor Barker
2014	Laura Trott	Katie Archibald	Elinor Barker
2015	Alice Barnes	Molly Weaver	Katie Archibald
2016	Alice Barnes	Lucy Garner	Molly Weaver
2017	Melissa Lowther	Manon Lloyd	Anna Christian
2018	Jessica Roberts	Ellie Dickinson	Anna Kay
2019	Anna Henderson	Lizzie Holden	Abby-Mae Parkinson
2020	Cancelled due to the COVID-19 pandemic in the United Kingdom		
2021	Pfeiffer Georgi	Josie Nelson	Anna Shackley
2022	Alice Towers	Pfeiffer Georgi	Elynor Bäckstedt
2023	Anna Shackley	Flora Perkins	Elynor Bäckstedt
2024	Flora Perkins	Millie Couzens	Alice Towers
2025	Millie Couzens	Zoe Backstedt	Cat Ferguson

=== Junior (Under 18) ===
Year	Gold	Silver	Bronze
2005	Louise Mahe	Lara Wann	Kim Blythe
2006	Emma Trott	Alice Monger-Godfrey	Monica Eden
2007	Hannah Mayho	Sarah Reynolds	Emma Trott
2008	Lucy Martin	Katie Colclough	Hannah Mayho
2017	Lauren Murphy	Maddie Gammons	Ellie Russell
2018	Amelia Sharpe	Elynor Bäckstedt	Anna Docherty
2019	Eluned King	Elynor Bäckstedt	Maddie Wadsworth
2020	Cancelled due to the COVID-19 pandemic in the United Kingdom		
2021	Millie Couzens	Emma Jeffers	Flora Perkins
2022	Zoe Bäckstedt	Awen Roberts	Matilda McKibben
2023	Amelia Cebak	Lucy Glover	Cat Ferguson
2024	Cat Ferguson	Imogen Wolff	Isabel Mayes
2025			

== See also ==
- British National Time Trial Championships
