= 2006 British National Road Race Championships =

The British National Road Race Championships 2006 took place on 24 and 25 June in the Yorkshire town, Beverley. The men's road race saw a new champion, Hamish Haynes but the women's race held no surprises as Nicole Cooke took her seventh victory - her sixth in a row.

== Races ==
=== Men's National Road Race Championships ===
The men's race started in Beverley and the 116.8 mile race took the riders around East Riding, before finishing with 3 laps on a 4.9 miles circuit in Beverley. The line-up of 76 riders included 4 former champions, Jeremy Hunt, Matthew Stephens, Roger Hammond and the reigning champion Russell Downing.

The attacks started as soon as the race started, with the first attacker being Adam Norris. There were many other attacks in the early stages of the race and some of the prominent attackers were: Duncan Urquhart, Jeremy Hunt, Steve Cummings and Roger Hammond. Jonathan Dayus and Russell Downing attacked on the climb at Nunburnhome, with around 85 miles gone. They were caught by the chasing group on the descent, Haynes and Urquhart then established a slender lead over the group. Hammond, Geraint Thomas, Dale Appleby and Matt Talbot, broke away to chase but Talbot soon gave up and dropped back.

The 3 chasers came together with Haynes and Urquhart, and they regained a slight lead with one 5 miles circuit to go. Amazingly, they hung on. Thomas began the sprint with a few hundred metres to go, but with 100m Haynes sprinted past to take the victory, with Hammond 2nd and Thomas 3rd. A group of 14 riders came in just 10 seconds behind, with 4 more 28 seconds behind the leaders. Dean Downing was the next rider to finish, but he was over 7 minutes down on Haynes. Glen Turnbull brought up the rear, nearly half an hour behind.

==== Results ====
Pos	Rider	Time
1	Hamish Haynes	4:51.08
2	Roger Hammond	s.t.
3	Geraint Thomas	s.t.
4	Dale Appleby	+ 0.03
5	Duncan Urquhart	+ 0.06
6	Kristian House	+ 0.08
7	Steve Cummings	s.t.
8	Daniel Lloyd	s.t.
9	Ian Wilkinson	s.t.
10	Jonathan Dayus	s.t.
11	Matt Talbot	s.t.
12	Russell Downing	s.t.
13	Johnathan Rosenbrier	s.t.
14	Andrew Jackson	s.t.
15	Robin Sharman	s.t.
16	Matthew Stephens	s.t.
17	Martin Ford	s.t.
18	Kevin Dawson	s.t.
19	Alex Coutts	+0.12
20	Jeremy Hunt	+0.27

=== Women's National Road Race Championships ===
The women's race followed a different route than the men's race and was just over half the distance of the men's race, lasting 63.5 miles. There were around 60 participants and 39 of those completed the course.

==== Results ====
Pos	Rider	Time
1	Nicole Cooke	2:51.29
2	Lorna Webb	+ 0.25
3	Jo Rowsell	+ 0.25
4	Amy Hunt	+ 0.25
5	Tanja Slater	+ 0.25
6	Catherine Hare	+ 0.25
7	Caroline Kluiber	+ 0.25
8	Helen Wyman	+ 0.25
9	Wendy Houvenaghel	+ 0.27
10	Rachel Heal	+ 0.27

== See also ==
- 2006 National Cycling Championships
- British National Road Race Championships
