= Keith Lambert =

British cyclist (born 1947)

Personal information
- Born: 12 June 1947 (age 79) Bradford, England

Cycling career
- Sport: Cycling
- Current team: Great Britain Under-23 National Team
- Discipline: Road
- Role: Rider; Directeur sportif

Professional teams
- 1971–1973: Falcon–Tighe
- 1974–1977: Holdsworth–Campagnolo
- 1978–1979: Viking–Campagnolo
- 1980: Weinmann-Chicken
- 1981–1984: Falcon–Campagnolo
- 1985: Elswick–Falcon–Maillard
- 1986: Falcon–Hutchinson
- 1987: Watertech–Dawes–Imp Sport

Managerial teams
- 1987: Watertech–Dawes–Imp Sport
- 1988–1989: P.M.S.–Interent–Dawes
- 1990–1993: Banana–Falcon
- 1994: Foremost Contract Furnisher
- 1995: Peugeot UK-Look-Bell
- 1998: Team Brite Voice
- 1999–2000: Linda McCartney Racing Team
- 2009: Team Halfords
- 2010: Motorpoint–Marshalls Pasta
- 2013–: Great Britain Under-23 National Team

Keith Lambert (born 12 June 1947) is a twice former British cycling champion and manager of the British under-23 road race team.

== Cycling career ==
Lambert signed his first professional cycling contract with Falcon cycling team in 1972 under Albert Hitchen the Falcon team manager. His first win as a pro was on Stage Two of the Tour of the West, into Penzance in Cornwall. He rode the 1972 UCI Road World Championships which took place on the 6 August 1972 in Gap, France but punctured twice and did not finish. Lambert signed with the Holdsworth cycling team for 1974 alongside Les West and Colin Lewis and won the British National Road Race Championships for the first time that year. He raced and finished Paris–Roubaix in 1977 before signing for Viking in 1978. At the 1979 World Championship at Valkenburg aan de Geul Lambert finished in 26th place of just 44 riders finishing including no other British finishers. In 1980 Lambert signed with Weinmann and finished third in the Druivenkoers Overijse behind Fons De Wolf and Rudy Pevenage and Lambert pipped Bill Nickson to the 1980 National Road Championship by an inch for his second British champion title in Redditch. Lambert joined Falcon in 1981 and then spent six seasons there. He rode the 1982 World Championship at Goodwood and in 1983 Lambert won the National Criterium Championships. In total Lambert won 64 professional races between 1972 and 1987.

== Management career ==
After his racing career Lambert moved into management and managed British Cycling's u23 squad up for a decade until retiring after the 2019 UCI Road World Championships held in Harrogate in his home county. Prior to that he was manager of Banana-Falcon when Keith Reynolds won Stage One of the Tour of the Americas and at the Vuelta a Murcia where Dave Rayner finished seventh overall. Lambert would help Raynor earn a move to the continent in Jan Raas CLAS–Cajastur team and would later become a trustee of the Dave Raynor Fund. He was manager at Brite and signed Chris Newton, Rob Hayles, Jon Clay, Bryan Steel and Matt Illingworth. Lambert became assistant team manager at Linda McCartney Racing Team to Sean Yates and was in the team car when David McKenzie won his stage at the 2000 Giro d'Italia. In 2008 Shane Sutton who was with British Cycling rang Lambert and asked him to look after the ‘foreign based riders’ in the British Road Race Championships such as David Millar, Mark Cavendish, Roger Hammond and Jeremy Hunt. Following that he was asked to help Max Sciandri with the young British riders coming back from Italy for the Tour of Britain. From 2011 Lambert started full time with British Cycling looking after the u23 team where he would work with riders such as Simon Yates (cyclist) and Tom Pidcock, before retiring at the end of the 2019 season.

== Major results ==
1974
1st Road race, National Road Championships
1975
2nd Road race, National Road Championships
1980
1st Road race, National Road Championships
3rd Druivenkoers-Overijse
1981
2nd London–Bradford
1983
2nd Road race, National Road Championships
