= Chris Walker (cyclist) =

English cyclist

Personal information
- Nationality: English
- Born: 26 March 1965 (age 61) Sheffield

Sport
- Sport: Cycling

Chris Walker (born 26 March 1965) is a male former professional cyclist from Sheffield. He represented England in the road race, at the 1998 Commonwealth Games in Kuala Lumpur, Malaysia.

== Cycling career ==
=== Amateur achievements ===
- 1982 Peter Buckley Trophy National Junior Road Race Series Winner including wins at Peak Forest RR, Stokesley Classic and Lincoln GP West Common counting events
- 1983 Peter Buckley Trophy National Junior Road Race Series Winner including 4 wins from 8 counting events, making him the only person to have won the competition twice
- 7th World Junior Road Race Championships – Wanganui New Zealand
- 5th National Amateur Road Race Championships – Buxton
- 1984 Lived and raced for Fanini amateur team in Italy. 3 wins and represented GB team in pro-am Tour of Sweden and 3 other occasions Internationally
- 1985 17 wins racing for Paragon Racing Team in UK
- 1986 15 wins including 100 km National Team Time Trial Championships setting new competition record- Paragon Racing Team

=== Professional achievements ===
In 1987 Walker turned professional signing for the Watertech-Dawes Team of Keith Lambert, Sid Barras, Dave Millar & Phil Wilkins. He achieved six wins and won the TV Times sprints competition in the inaugural Kelloggs Pro Tour of Britain. He was awarded Professional Cycling Associations 'Best new professional'. In 1988 he signed for Raleigh Banana and achieved five wins and the Wincanton Sprints winner TV city centre cycle series. The following year brought four wins including the Nottingham City Centre TV race.

In 1990 he won 16 times for the team (now called Banana Falcon) including McEwans L.A. Lager TV series and was the Professional Cycling Association 'Rider of the year'. 1991 saw 19 wins including five stage wins in the Milk Race claiming the Points and combine jerseys. He also won four stages and the points jersey in the Settimana Bergamasca and a stage in the Tour of Vaucluse. He rode for Subaru Montgomery in 1992 and won eight races including three Scottish Provident wins in the UK Professional road race championship. Riding for IME Healthshare in 1993 he badly damaged wrist tendons in a crash during a Portuguese stage race, the following year he signed for LEX Townsend and won five times including the Lincoln GP and Aberdeen TV race. In 1995 for Peugeot he claimed eight 8 wins including 3 Sky TV series city Centre races and was 1st Overall in the series. He also won a silver medal in the British National Road Race Championships.

In 1996 for the Invader- Nexus team he won five times including Five Valleys in Wales and one year later won six times including the Tour of Lancashire stage and Tour of Five Valleys. In 1998 for Team BRITE he won eight times including the Havant GP premier race and was 13th overall in the Tour of Britain and was National Criterium Champion. The following year he rode for the Linda McCartney team winning the National Criterium Championship, National 100 km team time trial, Grand Prix of Essex, Archer Grand Prix and two stages of the Girvan race.

== Post cycling ==
He retired in 2000 at the age of 35 and is now a product designer for RST Clothing. He is the father of racing cyclist Jessie Walker.
