= Dave Bedwell =

English cyclist

Personal information
- Full name: Dave Bedwell
- Born: 28 August 1928 Romford, England, United Kingdom
- Died: 28 February 1999 (aged 70)

Cycling career
- Sport: Cycling
- Discipline: Road
- Role: Rider
- Rider type: Sprinter

Professional teams
- 1951: Dayton
- 1952–1955: Hercules Cycles
- 1956: Meulenberg / Wearwell / Hercules
- 1957–1959: O'Brien Cycles
- 1959–1961: Viking Cycles
- 1962: Fred Dean Cycles
- 1963: Independent
- 1964: O'Brien-Bates

Major wins
- British National Road Race Champion (1961)

Dave Bedwell (28 August 1928, Romford, Essex, now the London Borough of Havering – 28 February 1999, Kingskerswell, Devon) was one of Great Britain's most accomplished racing cyclists in the 1950s, known as the "Iron Man" of cycling. He won four stages in the first Tour of Britain, rode for Britain in the world professional road championship in 1953 and 1956 and rode for Britain in the Tour de France.

== Origins ==
Bedwell, who was 5 ft 4 in (1.63 m) tall, lived on the outskirts of London, in Romford, now part of Havering. His family were cyclists but Bedwell was more interested in swimming. He began cycling as a way to get to water. He bought a bike from a local dealer, Rory O'Brien, and turned to cycling instead. He rode time trials and raced on grass tracks, winning the Essex five-mile championship as an under-18 and then as a senior. He won the title three times as well as the all-London junior sprint championship at Paddington track. He said:

Looking back, that is what I should have done – pure sprinting – and I could have made a lot of money. When I was racing at the world championships in Cologne in 1954 they timed me doing an 11.4 [seconds] for the last 200 metres, although I don't know how accurate that was. I once beat Reg Harris in the sprint in a devil. I had an offer to ride a six-day in Denmark but I didn't fancy it and I suppose it was a silly thing to have stayed on the road.

British cycling in Bedwell's time was in a civil war between the National Cyclists' Union and the Road Time Trials Council on one side and a newer body, the British League of Racing Cyclists, on the other. The BLRC began during the second world war to promote the massed racing on public roads that the other two organisations feared would bring police opposition to all cycling. Bedwell joined the Romford Wheelers, which was affiliated to the NCU. In its colours he rode massed races on the airfield at Stapleford Tawney but preferred the idea of racing on the road with the BLRC and formed his own club, the Romford RCC, to do it.

His Romford Wheelers clubmate, Jack Leeth, recalled: "Dave was demobbed from the RAF around 1948. He lived in the Bedwell family home in Carlton Road, Romford, a cycling household with its own fitness room. Dave already had a reputation as a great cyclist and was into healthy eating." Another local cyclist, Roger St Pierre, said: "They didn't come any tougher than this stocky man whose thighs seemed thicker than his legs were long. He effectively invented interval training for cyclists: sprinting between telephone poles, freewheeling to the next one, then sprinting again, the freewheeling stretches getting shorter and shorter. We could keep it up for, maybe, four or five sprints, but tough Dave could keep going at it for mile after mile. And yet, on other rides, Dave would plod along at such a slow pace that you'd think he would need stabilisers to stop from falling off for loss of momentum."

== Racing career ==
Sprinting was really my speciality and I was a moderate climber, although I was the best in the country on steep hills. I won the Tour of the Peak three times, and when I won the king of the mountains in the Tour of Britain I could sprint at the top of the climbs. Surprisingly, I went better in the Lake District as I preferred hills with a steep bit at the top rather than the ones that levelled out. I never sat in, although I was accused of it sometimes. Every time I got to the front of the bunch, they all put their gears up.

—

Bedwell won the BLRC road championship in his first year and then took an independent, or semi-professional, licence to ride for Frejus Cycles, a continental company selling bikes in Britain. Bedwell said: "This was not so surprising as it would be nowadays. Since the League were outlawed, their titles were unofficial and there were no selections to be gained by staying amateur. The big idea of League boys was to get a professional class going."

Bedwell won London-Battle-London and Dover-London in his first years. He was chosen by the BLRC in 1951 to ride the Grand Prix de l'Humanité in France. He won.

He became a full professional in 1952, moving back to the NCU so that he could ride a new series of pro races started at Herne Hill velodrome by a journalist, Johnny Dennis, of The Bicycle. Dennis's idea was that the experience would help British riders break through on the continent. They competed every other week, individually and in pairs. Bedwell's partner was another Londoner, Derek Buttle. There were more than 20 professional riders in Britain.

Buttle and Bedwell rode for Claud Butler, a London cycle company. But money was limited and Buttle arranged sponsorship from Hercules Cycles for them, Dennis Talbot and Clive Parker. The team expanded and in 1954 it won the Tour of Britain along with seven of its daily stages. Bedwell's most spectacular stage was the last. It lasted 127 miles from Bournemouth to Alexandra Palace in north London. If Bedwell won the stage, he would move from seventh to third, behind the Frenchman Eugène Tamburlini and the British rider, Brian Robinson. The race skirted London on the North Circular Road, the northern half of the city's ring road. Bob Maitland of the BSA team and Henri Guldemont of Belgium had a lead on the field of 400 metres. Bedwell reached them in the park of Alexandra Palace, sprinted past them and collapsed on the grass from his effort.

Bedwell joined Buttle and the rest of the Hercules team when it went to Les Issambres, in south-west France, to prepare for the Tour de France of 1955. Hercules was Britain's largest professional team and it was certain that riders for the national team would be drawn from it. The team rode the early-season races along the Côte d'Azur that riders used for training. Bedwell finished second to Jacques Anquetil at Fréjus, just ahead of Jean Stablinski. The following day he outsprinted Anquetil for third place at Marseille. In the Tour, however, Bedwell left the race after three days, told he was outside the time limit when he wasn't but happy nevertheless to drop out. He said:

I had punctured twice and was going nice and steady when I was talked into it by Bev Woods [a team-mate], who told me I was well outside the time limit, but I was well inside. I didn't know until the next day that they would let everyone start, even those who had finished outside the time limit. I wasn't really interested in riding the Tour and I should have had the courage to say no. Another year, I would have been keen to ride. I had a medical test before the start and they said I had heart trouble, that didn't leave me with much morale for the race.

Only Brian Robinson and Tony Hoar of the British team completed the race, the first Britons to do so. Hercules and other sponsors pulled out of sponsorship weeks after the end of the Tour. Bedwell rode unsponsored for two years, living off prizes in Belgium.

== Bicycle ==
Bedwell's shortness meant he rode a 19 1/2-inch frame, unusually small. He said:

"I had to design my own. My angles would be 72 head, 74 seat, with two-inch offset forks, 20-inch top tube, 17-inch stays. I used a close-ratio block. The 13 was the smallest cog I used and 53×13 the biggest gear. I went up Porlock hill on 49×28 which was still hard and I would use 52×16 for sprinting, and 92-inch for the track, although I can't remember how we arrived at it as we would use inch-pitch rings and sprockets and a block chain. It was more rigid and gave better acceleration."

== Retirement ==
Bedwell moved to Paignton, Devon, and built wheels in a cycle shop owned by another former Tour de France rider, Colin Lewis. He took up canoeing and surfing. He said he missed Essex even 20 years later. He said: "There are certain things, like the countryside, the slow rivers, the cottages with their thatched roofs, whereas here the houses have big roofs and the rivers are rapid." He died on a club ride with the local Cyclists Touring Club and members of the Mid-Devon Road Club.

== Palmarès ==
1949
1st (United Kingdom) British National Road Race Championships – BLRC amateur

1950
1st Grand Prix de l'Humanité

1951
1st (United Kingdom) British National Road Race Championships – BLRC independent road race (for semi-professional riders)
2nd stage Tour of Britain, Bournemouth
4th stage Tour of Britain, Weston-Super-Mare
8th stage Tour of Britain, Newcastle
9th stage Tour of Britain, Scarborough

1953
5th stage Tour of Britain, Newcastle
7th stage Tour of Britain, Morecambe
9th stage Tour of Britain, Cheltenham

1954
4th stage Tour of Britain, Whitley Bay
9th stage Tour of Britain, Wolverhampton
10th stage Tour of Britain, Weston-Super-Mare
13th stage Tour of Britain, London

1955
1st South Elmsall Spring Classic

1958
6th stage Milk Race, Llandudno
10th stage Milk Race, Plymouth

1961
1st (United Kingdom) British National Road Race Championships – professional
1st Tour of the Peak

1962
1st Criterium des Vainquers
1st Slough Grand Prix
1st Chequers Grand Prix
2nd British National Road Race Championships – professional

1964
1st Enell road race
1st Tour of Belvoir
1st '34 Nomads Grand Prix
