= Geoff Wiles =

English professional racing cyclist

Personal information
- Full name: Geoffrey John Wiles
- Nickname: Kamo
- Born: 18 June 1944 (age 82)

Cycling career
- Sport: Cycling
- Current team: Abellio SFA Racing Team
- Disciplines: Road and track
- Role: Rider
- Rider type: Sprinter

Amateur teams
- 1962–1970: Individual
- 2011–Current: Abellio SFA Racing Team

Professional teams
- 1970: Clive Stuart
- 1971–1978: Holdsworth - Campagnolo
- 1979–1981: Other teams and individual

Major wins
- British National Road Race Championships (1976)
Medal record
Men's track cycling
Representing United Kingdom
UCI Track Cycling Masters World Championships
Gold medal – first place	2014	M70-74 Points race
Gold medal – first place	2014	M70-74 Individual Pursuit

Geoff Wiles (born 18 June 1944) is an English former professional racing cyclist.

He won the national road championship as a professional in 1976 and competed for his country as an amateur. He organised cycling and other races, helped form BMX in Britain and ran a cycle-shop in Kent, England. He now competes for Great Britain in world masters cycling events, and coaches a regional cycle racing team (Abellio SFA Racing Team)

== Early life ==
Born in Strood, Kent, England, Wiles began cycling when his parents, Joan and 'Sailor' (Earnest), took him and his sister, Hilary, with them in sidecars attached to their bicycles. He joined the local branch of the Youth Hostels Association and rode with enthusiasts there until a colleague at work at the BP refinery on the Isle of Grain in Kent, south-east England, persuaded him to join the Medway Road Club. He rode his first 10-mile time trial when he was 15 and finished in 26m 47s on a heavy bike with a fixed gear and John Bull Safety tyres.

== Amateur cycle racing career ==
He came third in his first road race, at Hoo, Kent, when he was 18. His first important win was the three-day Vectis event on the Isle of Wight the following year.

The win brought Wiles selection for the South of England team for the Milk Race, and the Tour of Britain in 1966. He won a stage at Hove, near Brighton. Wiles then went on to compete for Britain in amateur stage races across the world both sides of the Iron Curtain, including

- the Peace Race (1967 and 1968)
- the Tour of Poland (1968)
- the Tour of Ireland (1968)
- the Tour du Maroc (1968)
- the Tour de l'Avenir (1969).

== Professional cycle racing career ==
Wiles then joined the Clive Stuart professional team, based at a cycle business near his home, in 1970. He rode with Reg Smith, John Clarey, Pete Smith and Reg Barnett, winning his sponsors' own race, the Clive Stuart Grand Prix, that same year. From there he moved to the Holdsworth team alongside Les West, Colin Lewis and others and won the national road championship in 1976. He came third in 1977.

Wiles also competed in track cycling during the 1970s. In 1971, shortly after joining the Holdsworth team, he and teammate Dave Nie won gold at the British National Madison Championships in a time of 01h 43m 46s.

Holdsworth sent a team to Paris–Roubaix. Wiles and his teammate, Phil Corley finished behind the main field. Wiles said the first 20 were allowed on the velodrome where the race finished and the doors were then closed and the rest were stopped from entering. "So we bunked over the wall and did our [finishing] lap," he said. "We could then say we'd completed the course, even though we were not included on the official list of finishers."

He moved to Carlton Cycles, sponsored by a company that was part of the Raleigh empire, in 1979 and then to minor sponsors, Glemp and New Style Windows, before retiring after 1981.

Wiles organised races while still riding and, in retirement from competition, organised more races and also what he called "the toughest race in the world": a quadrathlon of a two-mile swim in the sea, a 50 km walking race, a 100-mile cycling race around the Brands Hatch motor-racing circuit, and a full marathon that ended in Gravesend, near his home. He also helped launch BMX in Britain, founding an organising body and commentating on television.

== Masters Racing career (2011–present) ==
Following a period as the proprietor of a bicycle shop in Strood, Geoff Wiles began competing in Masters cycle racing events.

In April/May 2012 Wiles took part in the Alf Buttler Peace Race Tribute Ride, riding all thirteen stages of the original 1955 Peace Race.

In 2014, Wiles competed for Great Britain (GBR) in the UCI World Cycling Tour (UWCT) Final (formerly the UCI Amateur Road World Championships). Wiles suffered a leg injury during the race, but still finished fourth in the Male Over-70s category of the Road Race event.

In October 2014, he competed for GBR in yet another World Championship, this time in Manchester: The UCI Track Cycling Masters World Championships. Here Wiles gained 3 medals, including gold in both the M70-74 Points race and the M70-74 Individual Pursuit.

Wiles now lives with his wife Barbara in Kent, where he coaches the San Fairy Ann Racing Team. In 2010 he completed a BSc degree in Sports Science at the University of Greenwich.

=== List of other 2014 titles ===
- British Cycling National Masters Road Race 70+ champion
- British Cycling National Masters Circuit Race 70+ champion
- League of Veteran Racing Cyclists National Road Race champion
- League of Veteran Racing Cyclists National Track championships: Gold in Scratch race, Points race, and Individual pursuit.

== See also ==
- British National Road Race Championships
- Peace Race
- List of British cyclists
