= Neil Martin (cyclist) =

British cyclist (born 1960)

Personal information
- Full name: Neil Martin
- Born: 1 April 1960 (age 66) Birmingham, England

Cycling career
- Sport: Cycling
- Current team: Cycling Ireland
- Discipline: Road
- Role: Rider (retired); Directeur sportif; Team manager
- Rider type: Climbing specialist

Amateur team
- 1979: Athletic Club de Boulogne-Billancourt

Professional teams
- 1985–1987: Percy Bilton
- 1988: Emmelle–MBK

Managerial teams
- 2015: SEG Racing
- 2016–2017: An Post–Chain Reaction
- 2018–: Cycling Ireland

Neil Martin (born 1 April 1960) is a British former cyclist. He competed at the 1980 Summer Olympics and the 1984 Summer Olympics. He now works as a team manager for under-23 cyclists within Cycling Ireland's High Performance Unit.

His father, Vic, competed in grass track racing on weekends whilst working for GEC as an electrical engineer. He is the father of Dan Martin, and related by marriage to Stephen Roche and Nicolas Roche, all fellow racing cyclists. Martin joined the new SEG Racing team in 2015 as a directeur sportif. He moved across to An Post–Chain Reaction in 2016 to take up the same role, staying with the team in 2017.

== Major results ==
1978
3rd Overall Drei Etappen Rundfahrt Frankfurt
1979
1st Grand Prix Des Issambres
1980
1st Stage 2 Rás Tailteann
2nd Road race, National Amateur Road Championships
2nd Overall Whittingham Homes Two Day
8th Overall Tour of Britain
1982
1st Overall Flèche du Sud
1st Mountains classification Tour of Scotland
1983
1st Stage 6b Tour of Britain
1984
1st Road race, National Amateur Road Championships
1st Lincoln Grand Prix
3rd Overall Star Trophy
1985
3rd Overall Beverley – White Rose Two Day
3rd Shrewsbury GP
1986
1st Stage 5 Tour of Britain
1st Tour of Delyn
1987
1st Saltburn Classic
1988
1st Stage 3 Tour of Wales
1991
1st Stage 3 Girvan – Easter Three Day
