= Dave Rand =

Welsh racing cyclist

Personal information
- Full name: David Rand
- Born: 8 December 1973 (age 52)

Cycling career
- Sport: Cycling
- Discipline: Road
- Role: Rider

Amateur team
- 2000: Bournemouth Arrow

Professional teams
- 1996: Team Energy
- 1998: PDM Sports – Concorde – WCU
- 2004: Sigma Sport RT

Major wins
- 1996 British National Champion

Dave Rand (born 8 December 1973) is a Welsh former-professional cyclist who represented Wales in the 1998 Commonwealth Games in Kuala Lumpur, riding the road race event.

== Palmarès ==
1996
1st British National Road Race Championships
5th Tour of the Cotswolds, Premier Calendar

1998
1st Perfs Pedal Race, Premier Calendar
6th Archer Grand Prix, Premier Calendar
4th Stage 1, Tour of Lancashire, Premier Calendar
6th British National Road Race Championships

2000
6th 45th GP Lincoln, Premier Calendar
