= Gary Crewe =

British cyclist

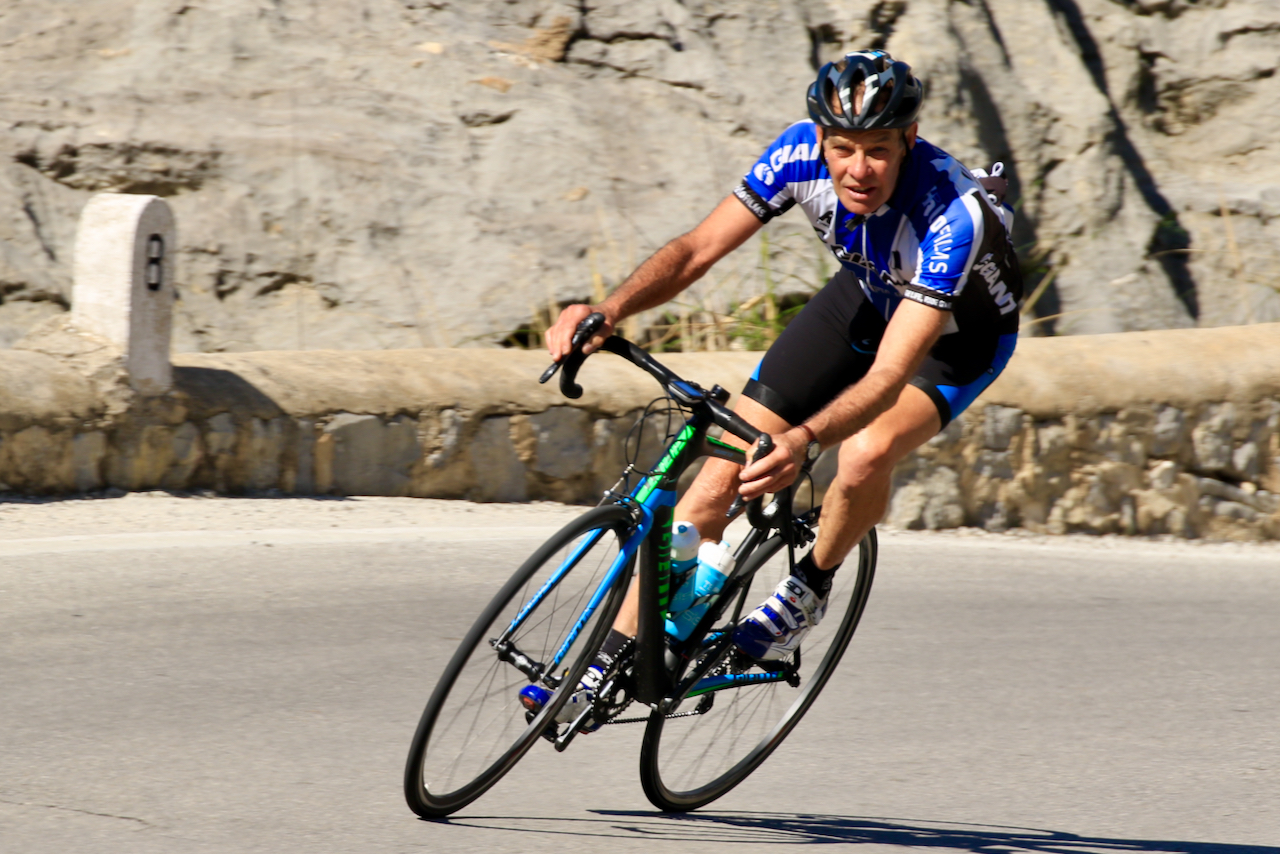
- Crewe descending Sa Calobra whilst training in Mallorca during October 2017

Personal information
- Born: 25 March 1946 (age 80) Matlock, Derbyshire, England
- Height: 1.82 m (6 ft 0 in)
- Weight: 70 kg (150 lb)

Cycling career
- Sport: Cycling
- Current team: Giant CC Halo Films

Amateur team
- 1967–1970: Western RC

Professional teams
- 1971–1973: Holdsworth Campagnolo
- 1974: Ti Raleigh
- 1975: Lutz BSA
- 1976–1977: Dawes Cycles

Major wins
- British National Road Race Championships 1972

Gary Crewe (born 25 March 1946) is a former international cyclist from England who competed at the Commonwealth Games.

== Biography ==
Crewe represented the England team at the 1970 British Commonwealth Games in Edinburgh, Scotland, where he participated in the road race event.

Crewe represented Great Britain at the World Road Championship as an amateur in 1970 in Leicester and as a professional in 1971 in Mendrisio.

== Other events ==
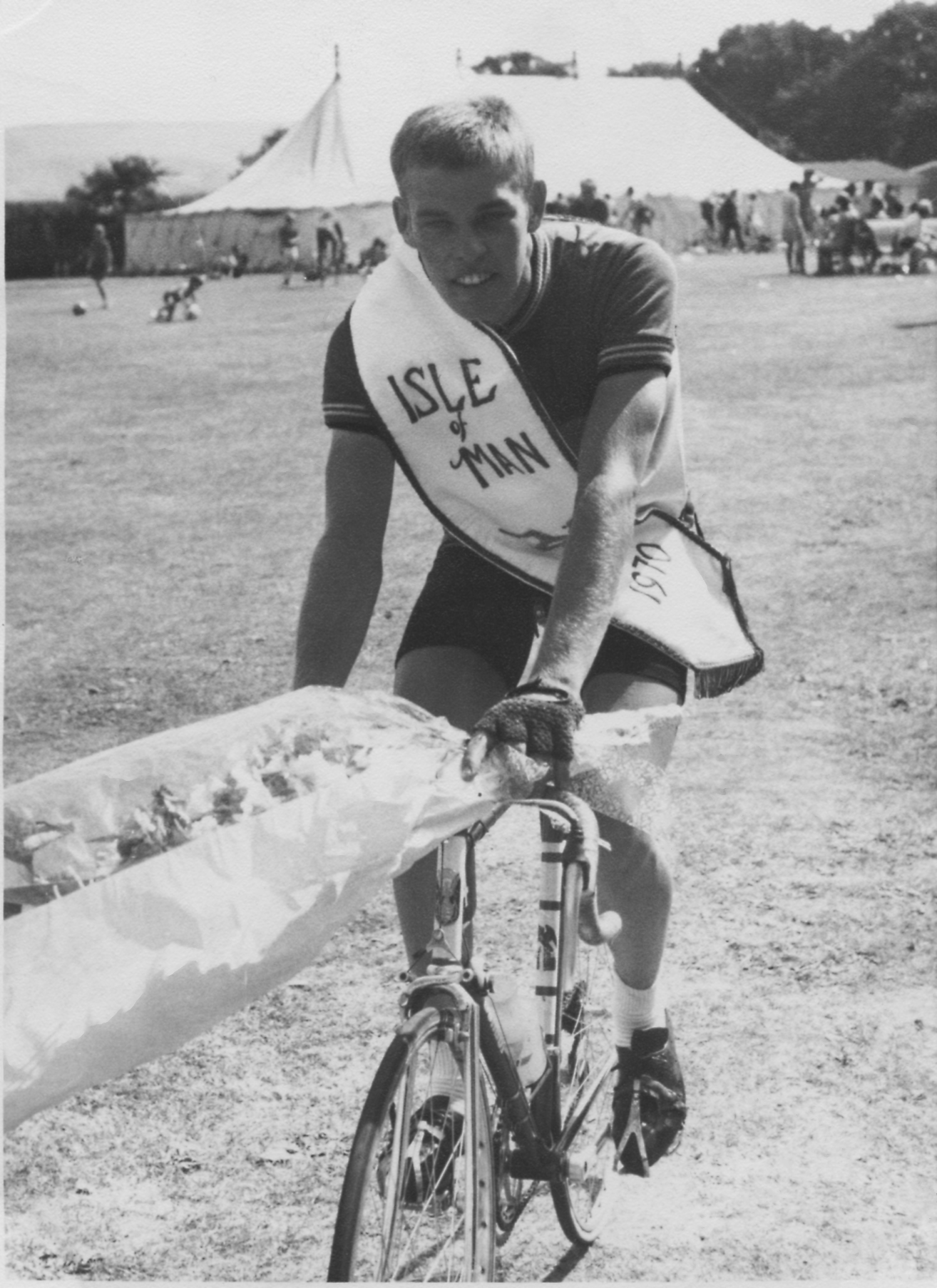
Gary Crewe celebrating winning the Manx International Road Race

- Tour of Britain Milk Race
- Tour of Algeria
- G.P. Annaba
- Tour of Grampians (4th place)
- Tour of Scotland (19th place)
- 1973 Tour de Suisse (35th place)

== Professional victories ==
- 1974 Plymouth criterium
- 1973 Tour of the West 5 day
- 1973 Mountains G.P.
- 1972 British National Road Race Championships. (1st)
- 1972 Mountains G.P. Tour of West
- 1972 Brooklands Criterium
- 1971 Tour of the North stage 2

== Major amateur results ==
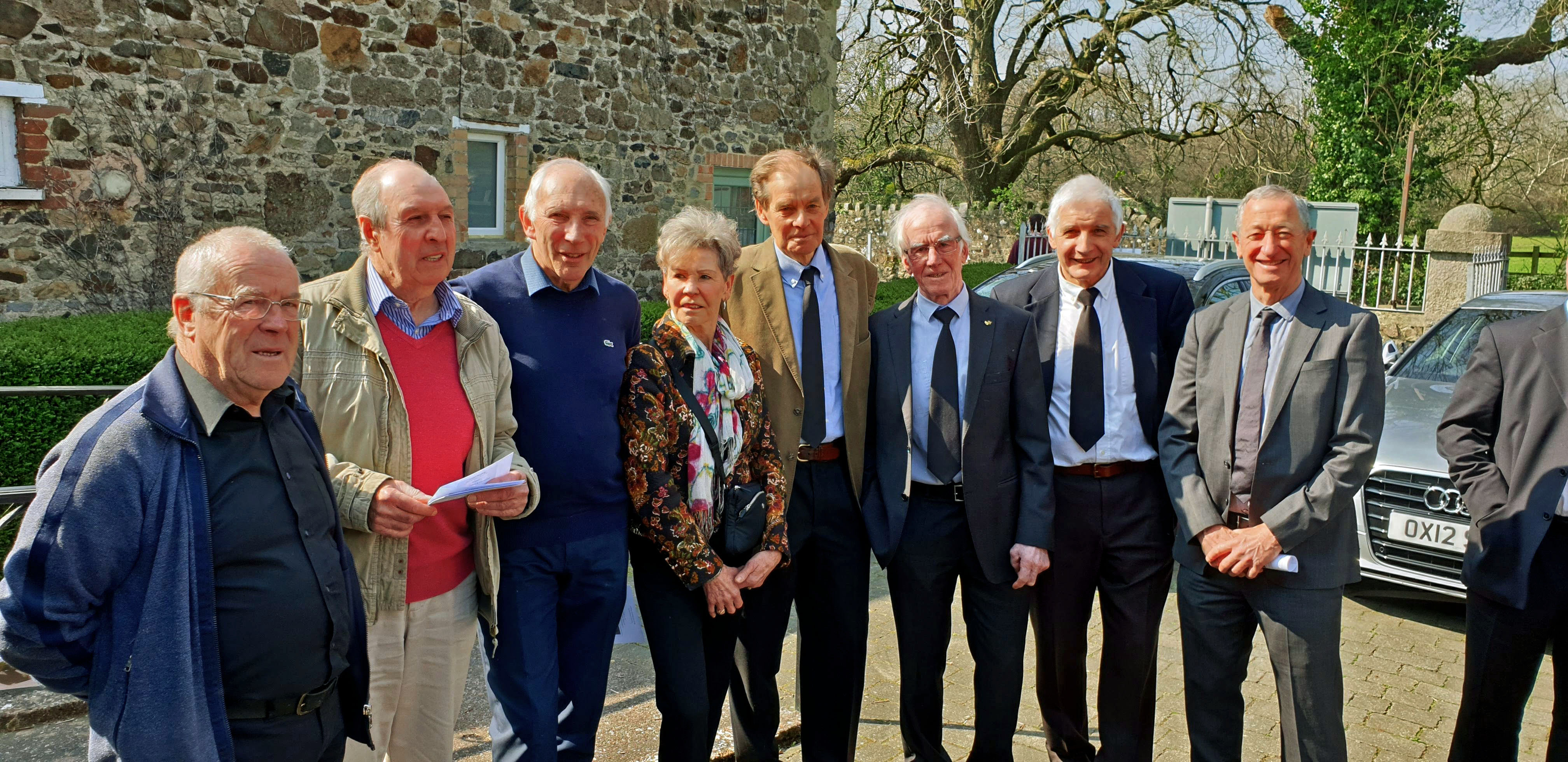
Colin Lewis' funeral on 25 March 2022

- 1992 National Series MTB Plymouth (1st)
- 1991 National Masters MTB Championship Malvern (3rd)
- 1970 Manx International (1st)
- 1970 Western Division Champion (1st)
- 1970 Tour of Grampians stage 3 (1st)
- 1970 National Amateur Road Championship (2nd)
- 1970 Tour of Britain Mountains G.P. (2nd)
- 1970 Tour of Grampians (4th)
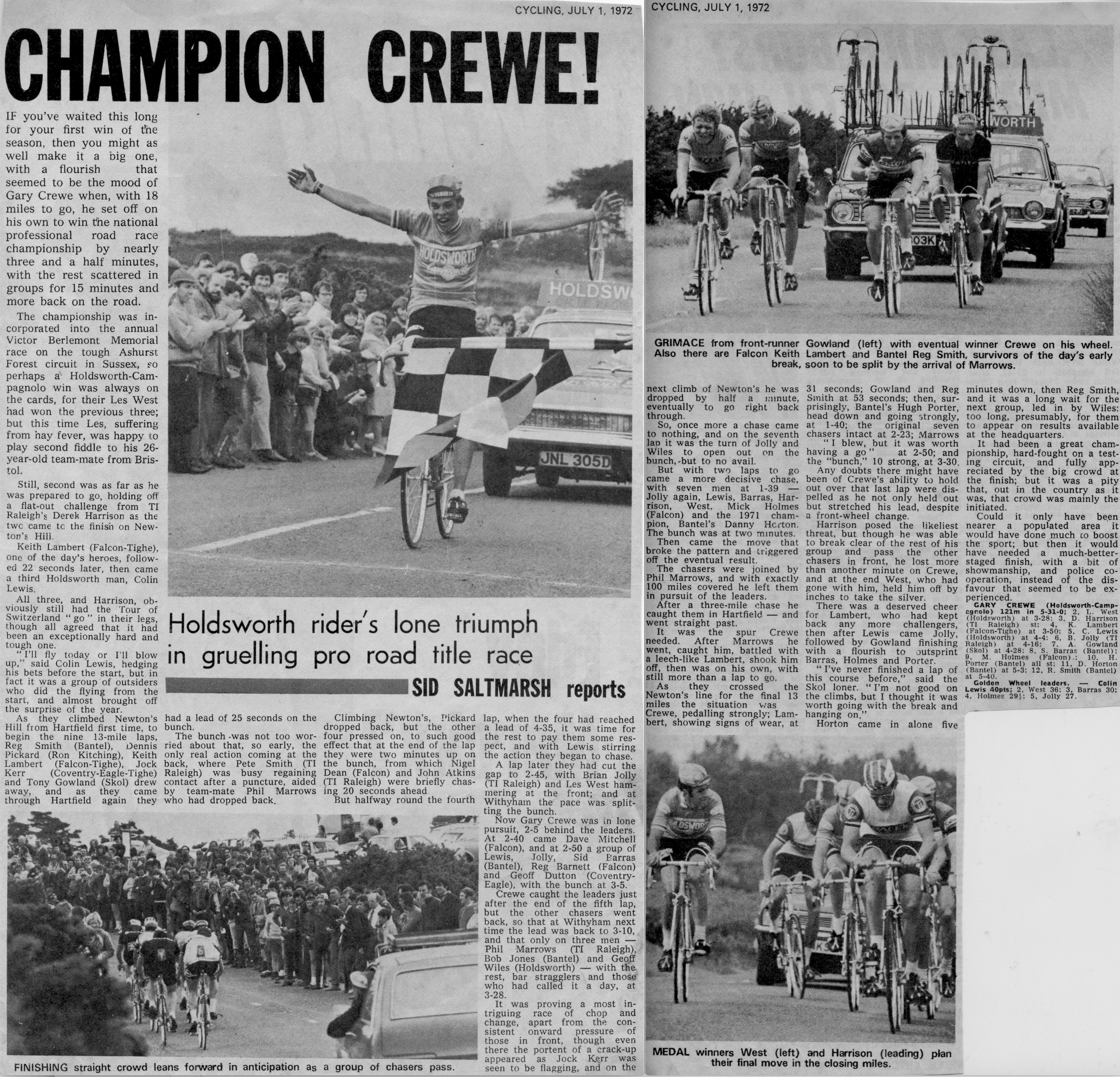
  Cycling news article covering British National Road Race 1972
- 1970 Commonwealth Games Road (8th)
- 1970 Tour of Britain Milk Race (15th)
- 1969 National Amateur Road Championship (7th)
- 1969 raced in Brittany France most of year
- 1969 Wenvoe RR (1st)
- 1968 National Amateur Road Championship (5th)
- 1968 Ras de Cymru stage 1 (1st)
- 1968 Tour of Scotland Milk Race (19th)
- 1968 Tour of Britain Milk Race (29th)
- 1967 Western Division Champion (1st)
- 1967 National Amateur Road Championship (14th)
