= Dale Appleby =

Welsh racing cyclist

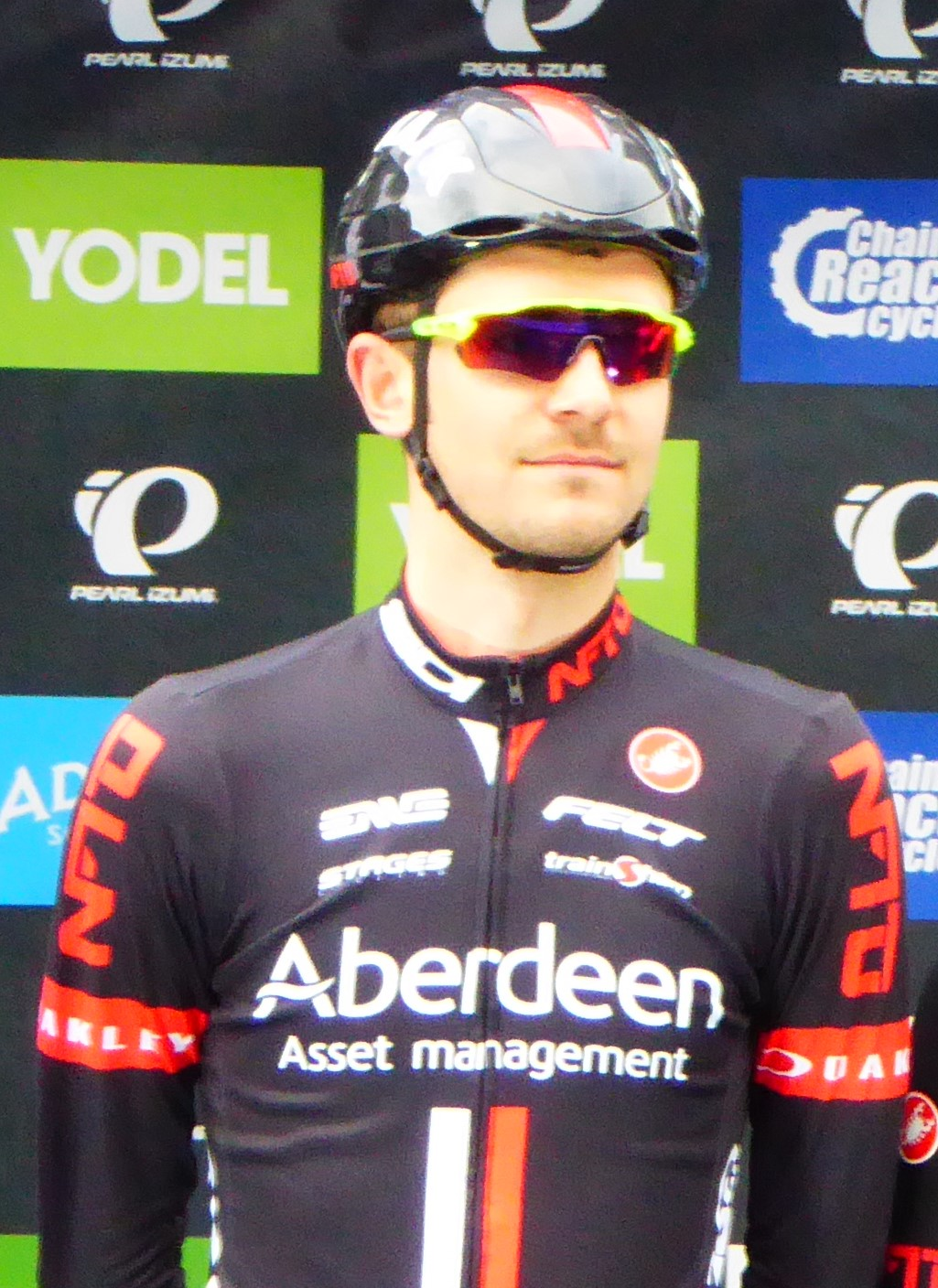
- Appleby in 2016

Personal information
- Full name: Dale Appleby
- Born: 19 December 1986 (age 39) Pontypridd, Wales

Cycling career
- Sport: Cycling
- Current team: Retired
- Discipline: Road
- Role: Rider

Professional teams
- 2006: Recycling.co.uk
- 2007: V.C. Seano One Team
- 2008: Rapha Condor–Recycling.co.uk
- 2009: CandiTV–Marshalls Pasta
- 2010: Team Raleigh
- 2011–2013: CyclePremier.com–Metaltek
- 2014–2016: NFTO

Dale Appleby (born 19 December 1986) is a Welsh former road racing cyclist, who competed professionally between 2006 and 2016. He represented Wales in the 2006 Commonwealth Games. In 2006 he rode for Recycling.co.uk and in 2007 he rode for the Italian V.C. Seano One Team. In 2010 he was with Team Raleigh and won the Welsh Road Race Championship.

Appleby joined the new NFTO squad for the 2014 season.

== Major results ==
2005
1st Mountains classification Tour of South
3rd Legstretchers Memorial to Betty Pharoah
4th Road race, Welsh National Road Championships
4th Overall P&O Irish Sea International Tour of North RR
2006
1st Road race, Welsh National Road Championships
British National Road Championships

3rd Time trial
4th Road race

3rd Perfs Pedal road race
2007
5th Cerbaia di Lamporecchion
2008
3rd Overall Bikeline 2 Day
2010
1st Road race, Welsh National Road Championships
2011
10th Ryedale Grand Prix
2012
5th Severn Bridge Road Race
2013
3rd Circuit d'Alger
6th Overall Tour d'Algérie
2014
7th National Circuit Race Championships
2015
5th National Circuit Race Championships
6th Hitter Road Race
8th Overall Totnes-Vire Stage Race
8th Stafford Kermesse
9th Otley Grand Prix
10th Stafford GP
10th Ryedale Grand Prix
2016
1st Severn Bridge Road Race
1st Scorpion CS Road Race
2nd Chorley Grand Prix
