= Keith Butler (cyclist) =

English cyclist (1938–2019)

Personal information
- Born: 2 September 1938 London, England
- Died: 13 March 2019 (aged 80) Surrey, England

Cycling career
- Sport: Cycling
- Disciplines: Road & Track
- Role: Rider

Professional teams
- 1964: Bertin 39 - Milremo
- 1965: Dossche Sport
- 1966: St-Raphaël-Gitane
- 1966: Ruberg-Continental
- 1967: Viking-Trumann's Steel
- 1968: Allinson

Keith Butler (2 September 1938 – 13 March 2019) was a British cycling champion who raced as a professional in Belgium and France and who later organised cycle races in England.

== Biography ==
Butler was born in London, England, in 1938. As an amateur, Butler won stages of the Milk Race, the Tour of Britain, in 1961 and 1963. He won the national team pursuit championship with colleagues from the Norwood Paragon club, south London, in 1963.

He represented England at the 1962 British Empire and Commonwealth Games in Perth, Australia, participating in the road race.

In 1962 he took part in Peace-Race and finished at 51. He went to Belgium to race soon afterwards. He won his second race, the first of 11 victories. He said:

"There'd be so many races that you'd cross one going the other way. And there'd be a lot of catcalling and waving and then you'd get on with the racing. And there'd be no team tactics allowed and there were no service cars or team cars. But what used to happen is that all the riders from, say, Destelbergen, would ride together in a group even though they came from four or five different clubs. But that's as far as it was allowed to go. The only times the roads were closed was in criteriums, and that was because they were on circuits of just two or three kilometres and it wouldn't be safe to have traffic on them. But that also meant you couldn't have many riders either, so they'd be invitation only. They'd get two or three good riders to attract the crowd, then all the local boys they could get and if there were any places left over you could get one as a foreigner. But essentially they were just by invitation".

He won the professional British National Road Race Championships at Harlow, Essex, in 1964, beating Albert Hitchen and Ged Coles. He finished third in 1965.

He returned to Belgium, took a fully professional licence - until then he had been an independent, a semi-professional allowed to ride with both amateurs and professionals - and rode briefly for Jacques Anquetil's St-Raphaël team before leaving shortly afterwards for the Ruberg team in West Germany. Butler earned 5,000 francs a month, he remembers, "which doesn't sound much now but remember that 1,000 francs would get you a flat for a month and that on top of your retainer you got your travel expenses and your prizes."

He rode the Belgian spring classics and finished 14th in the Tour of Flanders. He rode for Tom Simpson, a fellow Briton, in the 1965 world championship in Spain. There he followed Anquetil as the Frenchman began to chase. Anquetil was one of the fastest riders in the world alone. Butler said: "It was like riding behind a bloody motorbike!"

He also organised cycle races in southern England. He formed the Surrey League, a consortium of organisers, in 1974. It runs 170 races a year. He managed the British road teams at the world championship in Colorado and managed other teams in France, the Netherlands and Ireland.

His father, Stan Butler, was a significant time-triallist in Britain in an era when the country had only velodrome racing and dawn competitions on the road against the clock. Stan Butler also rode the Olympic Games. Keith Butler's son, Gethin Butler, was a prominent amateur rider in Britain during the 1990s.
