= Doug Dailey =

English racing cyclist

Doug Dailey MBE
Personal information
- Full name: Douglas James Dailey
- Born: 24 June 1944 (age 82) Liverpool, England, United Kingdom

Cycling career
- Sport: Cycling
- Discipline: Road
- Role: Rider

Amateur team
- Life member: Kirkby Cycling Club

Major wins
- British National Road Race Champion

Douglas James Dailey MBE (born 1944) is an English racing cyclist, former national road race champion and the former logistics manager of British Cycling. He has also been the national coach and an administrator.

== Biography ==
Dailey was born in Orrell Park, Liverpool. He represented his country on many occasions including several editions of the Tour of Britain. He received the Merseyside Golden Cycle award in 1969 and 1984. He retired from competition in 1986 after 26 years and became national coach for 10 years. After a brief break he returned as logistics manager. Dailey is also former manager of Kirkby Sports Centre. He lives in Ruthin, North Wales.

Dailey was logistics coordinator at the Summer Olympics for the third time in 2008, he ensured all British Cycling's kit, scientific equipment, medical back-up and the athletes themselves arrived safely in Beijing. Dailey began sending equipment out three months earlier, in May, to ensure everything ran smoothly. Dailey was appointed a Member of the Most Excellent Order of the British Empire (MBE) for services to sport in the 2008 New Year Honours. In 2009, he was inducted into the British Cycling Hall of Fame. Dailey is credited with discovering several important British cyclists, including Chris Froome.

== Palmarès ==
1963
1st Mersey Roads Two Day

1967
1st Mersey Roads Two Day

1969 Winner of Raleigh Dunlop Tour of Ireland, while riding with Kirkby CC

1972
1st (United Kingdom) British National Road Race Championships, Amateur
3rd Premier Calendar
1973
1st Tour of Ireland
1st Girvan 3 day

1st Stage 1, Girvan 3 day
1st Stage 3, Girvan 3 day

1st Mersey Roads Two Day
1976
1st (United Kingdom) British National Road Race Championships, Amateur
1977
3rd Girvan 3 day
1979
2nd Girvan 3 day
