= Jeremy Hunt (cyclist) =

British cyclist

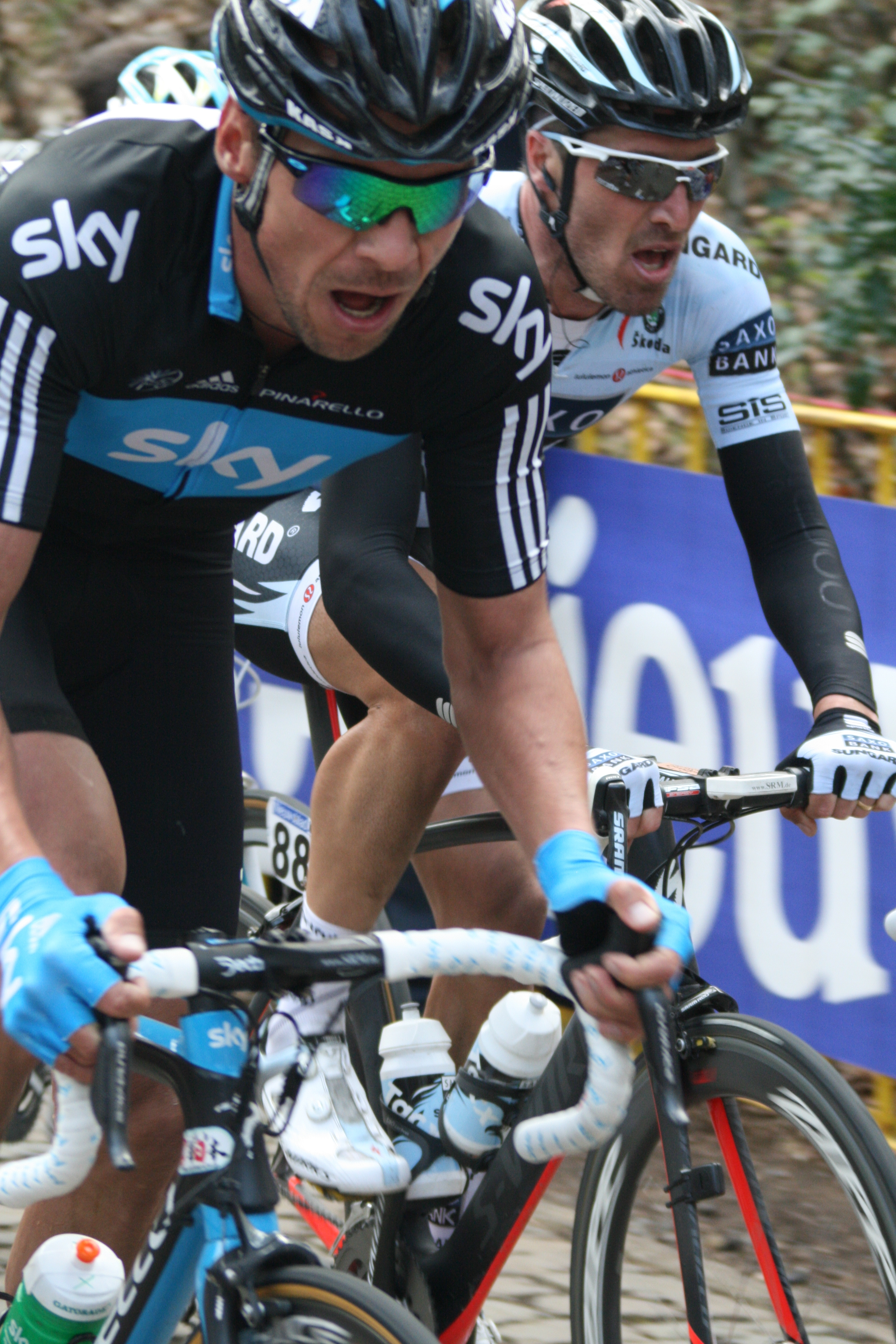
- Hunt (left) during the 2011 Tour of Flanders

Personal information
- Born: 12 March 1974 (age 52) Macklin, Saskatchewan, Canada

Cycling career
- Sport: Cycling
- Current team: Terengganu Cycling Team
- Discipline: Road
- Role: Rider (retired); Directeur sportif
- Rider type: Sprinter; Classics specialist

Professional teams
- 1996–1999: Banesto
- 2000–2002: BigMat–Auber 93
- 2003: MBK–Oktos–Saint-Quentin
- 2004–2007: Unibet.com
- 2008: Crédit Agricole
- 2009–2010: Cervélo TestTeam
- 2011–2012: Team Sky

Managerial teams
- 2013–2016: Synergy Baku
- 2016: Drapac Professional Cycling
- 2017–: Terengganu Cycling Team

Major wins
- One-day races and Classics National Road Race Championships (1997, 2001) GP Ouest-France (2002)

Jeremy Hunt (born 12 March 1974) is a British former road racing cyclist who raced for numerous years mainly a sprinter. Hunt was the winner of the British National Road Race Championships in 1997 and 2001. He now works as a directeur sportif for UCI Continental team Terengganu Cycling Team.

== Career ==
Hunt was born in Canada and grew up in England, firstly in Bury before moving to Devon. His father had been an amateur racing cyclist, and as a teenager in Devon Hunt was coached by former Tour de France rider Colin Lewis. He pursued his career in northern France before turning professional.

He made his professional cycling debut for Banesto in 1996, and rode there for 4 seasons, when in 2000 he began a 3-year stint at BigMat–Auber 93, taking a win against Mario Cipollini in a stage of the Tour Méditerranéen in his first season with the team. He spent 1 season for MBK-Oktos until in 2004 he joined Mr. Bookmaker–Palmans–Collstrop. Hunt joined Crédit Agricole in 2008, following the demise of the MrBookmaker, now called Unibet.com. In 2009 he joined Cervélo TestTeam, where he made his Tour de France debut in 2010 at the age of 36, having previously turned down the opportunity of racing in the Tour whilst at Banesto in 1997. In October 2010, after the demise of the Cervélo team, he was announced as a member of Team Sky's 2011 line-up.

Hunt was part of the Great Britain team that helped Mark Cavendish win the road race at the 2011 UCI Road World Championships.

== Personal life ==
He is the half-brother of racing cyclist Joshua Hunt.

== Major results ==
1994
1st Stage 16 Commonwealth Bank Classic
1995
1st GP Cristal Energie
1st Internatie Reningelst
1st Stage 1 Commonwealth Bank Classic
1997
1st Road race, National Road Championships
Tour de l'Avenir

1st Stages 3 & 9

1st Circuito de Getxo
1st Stage 3 Commonwealth Bank Classic
1st Stage 2 GP do Minho
1st Stage 1 Circuit Cycliste de la Sarthe
1st Stage 1 Vuelta Ciclista a la Rioja, Calahora
1st Stage 5 Vuelta Ciclista a Aragón, Zaragoza
1998
1st Trofeo Alcudia
Volta a Portugal

1st Stages 10 & 14

2nd Circuito de Getxo
1999
1st Stage 2 Commonwealth Bank Classic
2000
1st Sea Otter Classic
1st Stage 9 Herald Sun Tour
1st Stage 2 Tour Méditerranéen
2001
1st Road race, National Road Championships
1st Stage 4 Circuit Franco-Belge
1st Stage 2 Tour de la Somme
4th Nokere Koerse
6th GP de Fourmies
7th Grand Prix de la Ville de Lillers
10th Cholet-Pays de Loire
2002
1st GP Ouest-France
3rd Road race, National Road Championships
5th Paris–Bourges
5th Gran Premio della Costa Etruschi
2003
1st Stage 2 Tour de Picardie
2nd Road race, National Road Championships
2004
3rd Road race, National Road Championships
4th Paris–Brussels
8th Nokere Koerse
9th Druivenkoers Overijse
10th Dwars door Vlaanderen
2005
1st Stage 2 Tour de Wallonie
8th E3 Prijs Vlaanderen
2006
2nd Dwars door Vlaanderen
3rd Nokere Koerse
6th Overall Tour de Picardie
6th Kampioenschap van Vlaanderen
7th GP de Fourmies
9th Scheldeprijs
10th Cholet-Pays de Loire
2007
1st Grand Prix d'Ouverture La Marseillaise
2nd Paris–Brussels
4th Schaal Sels-Merksem
7th Overall Tour de Wallonie
2008
1st Stage 2 Tour de Langkawi
3rd Overall Delta Tour Zeeland
2009
1st Stage 4 Post Danmark Rundt
2nd National Criterium Championships
3rd Kuurne–Brussels–Kuurne
5th Overall Delta Tour Zeeland
10th Gent–Wevelgem
2010
4th Road race, National Road Championships
2011
1st East Yorkshire Classic
6th Overall Tour of Qatar
2012
5th Road race, National Road Championships

=== General classification results timeline ===
Grand Tour general classification results
Grand Tour	2002	2003	2004	2005	2006	2007	2008	2009	2010	2011	2012
Giro d'Italia	—	—	—	—	—	—	—	150	—	—	DNF
Tour de France	—	—	—	—	—	—	—	—	163	—	—
/ Vuelta a España	DNF	—	—	—	—	—	107	—	—	—	—

Legend
—	Did not compete
DNF	Did not finish
DNS	Did not start
