= Phil Corley =

British cyclist (born 1951)

Personal information
- Full name: Phillip John Corley
- Born: 17 April 1951 (age 75) Hampstead, London, England

Cycling career
- Sport: Cycling
- Discipline: Road
- Role: Rider

Amateur team
- Harp Road Club

Professional teams
- 1975–1978: Holdsworth–Campagnolo
- 1979–1980: Elswick–Falcon

Major wins
- One-day races and Classics National Road Race Championships (1978)

Phillip John Corley (born 17 April 1951) is a former British professional road racing cyclist.

== Cycling career ==
Corley represented Great Britain at the UCI Road World Championships three times in 1975, 1976 and 1978. In 1977, he participated in the only monument of his career; Paris–Roubaix, finishing 43rd overall. In 1978, Corley won the British National Road Race Championships, this being the biggest win of his career.

== Corley Cycles ==
In 1979, Corley founded his bike shop business, Corley Cycles, in Great Linford, Milton Keynes. In 1981, the shop moved to a larger premises in Neath Hill. Finally in 1982, the shop relocated to the industrial area of Stacey Bushes where it was until its closure in 2025.

== Major results ==
1971
1st Stage 7 Milk Race
1972
7th Lincoln Grand Prix
1973
8th Manx Trophy
1974
3rd Archer Grand Prix
1976
3rd Road race, National Road Championships
1978
1st Road race, National Road Championships
