= Catherine Swinnerton =

English cyclist (born 1958)

Personal information
- Born: 12 May 1958 (age 68) Fenton, Stoke-on-Trent, England

Cycling career
- Sport: Cycling
- Discipline: Road
- Role: Rider

Catherine Swinnerton (born 12 May 1958) is an English former racing cyclist. Born in Fenton, Staffordshire as one of seven children, Swinnerton is part of a cycling family, and founders of Swinnerton Cycles in Fenton.

== Career ==
She competed in the road race at the 1984 Summer Olympics in Los Angeles, where she finished 13th. She was twice British National Road Race Champion, winning in 1977 and 1984.

== Family ==
The Swinnerton family were a cycling family, Swinnerton Cycles was founded in 1915, in Victoria Road, Fenton, Stoke-on-Trent. Roy Swinnerton (1925-2013 and a national grass champion in 1956) and his wife Doris (née Salt) took over the shop in 1956 and set up a cycling club called Stoke ACCS during 1970.

Catherine's twin brother Paul was a three times British track champion, Bernadette won a world silver medal, Margaret, Mark and Bernard were all British internationals and Frances also competed for the club.

== Palmarès ==
1975
3rd British National Road Race Championships

1977
1st (United Kingdom) British National Road Race Championships

1979
2nd British National Road Race Championships

1981
3rd British National Road Race Championships

1982
2nd British National Road Race Championships

1984
1st (United Kingdom) British National Road Race Championships

1985
2nd Stage 18, Grande Boucle
