= Val Rushworth =

British cyclist (1939–2023)

Personal information
- Full name: Valerie M. Rushworth
- Born: Valerie M. Rainbow; 1939 Wakefield, Yorkshire, England
- Died: March 2023 (aged 83)

Cycling career
- Sport: Cycling
- Disciplines: Road & Track
- Role: Rider

Amateur teams
- 1964: Monckton CC
- 1970–: Fallowfield
- 2001–: Featherstone RC
- ?: Bob Jacksons

Valerie M. Rushworth (née Rainbow; 1939 – March 2023) was a British road and track racing cyclist.

== Biography ==
Rushworth's first sport was running, she was a member of the Wakefield Harriers. She started cycling with Monckton CC.

Rushworth was national road race champion in 1964 and held several records on the track including motor-paced records set in 1964: quarter-mile flying start in 23.5 seconds, half-mile flying start in 46.0 seconds and the mile flying start in 1 minute 34.0 seconds.

Rushworth won 11 British Championships between 1959 and 1966, and went on to represent Great Britain internationally, as a rider and later as coach and team manager.

In 1970 she moved to Featherstone RC.

Rushworth coached Lisa Brambani, who became a national road race champion four consecutive years between 1986 and 1989.

Rushworth was the European masters champion in the 500m TT for women aged 50 plus for four consecutive years between 1997 and 2000.

Rushworth joined Bob Jackson's team in 2001.

Rushworth, who lived in Allerton Bywater, Yorkshire near Wakefield, was coaching advisor for the Women's Cycle Racing Association. She worked as a customer services manager for Waddingtons Games.

Rushworth died in March 2023, at the age of 83.

== Palmarès ==
1964
1st (United Kingdom) British National Road Race Championships

1973
3rd Sprint, British National Track Championships

1997
1st (Europe) 500m TT, European Masters Track Championships (50+)

1998
1st (Europe) 500m TT, European Masters Track Championships (50+)

1999
1st (Europe) 500m TT, European Masters Track Championships (50+)

2000
1st (Europe) 500m TT, European Masters Track Championships (50+)

2004
3rd 500m TT, European Masters Track Championships (50+)
