= Lisa Brambani =

British cyclist (born 1967)

Personal information
- Born: 18 August 1967 (age 59) Bradford, England

Cycling career
- Sport: Cycling
Medal record
Cycling
Representing England
Commonwealth Games
Silver medal – second place	1990 Auckland	road race

Lisa Brambani (born 18 August 1967) is a female English retired racing cyclist.

== Cycling career ==
Brambani was part of the Great Britain team in the 1988 Summer Olympics and won a silver medal for England at the 1990 Commonwealth Games. She won the British National Road Race Championships on four occasions.

She represented England and won a silver medal in the road race, at the 1990 Commonwealth Games in Auckland, New Zealand.

== Personal life ==
Her daughter Abby-Mae Parkinson has also represented Great Britain in road cycling.
