= John Harvey (cyclist) =

British cyclist

Jack Harvey
Cycling career
- Sport: Cycling
- Discipline: Road

Major wins
- 1 mile. (1910)

John Harvey, sometimes called Jack Harvey (born 1884), from Stoke on Trent in Staffordshire, was a British professional road racing cyclist in the 1900s and 1910s. He held the National Cyclists' Union and the 25 mile title in 1909, and was the English Champion for the one mile distance, in 1910.

== Titles held ==
- English NCU Champion (25 miles) 1909, Open to the World
- English AAA Champion (25 miles) 1911
- English AAA Champion (1 mile and 5 miles) 1910
- Northern Champion (1/2 mile and 1 mile) 1911
- Northern Champion (1/2 mile and 5 miles) 1910
- Midland AAA Champion (1/2 mile) 1911
- Midland NCU Champion (1/4 mile) 1908
- Midland NCU Champion (25 miles) 1909

== Personal life ==
Between 1910 and 1913, Harvey ran a pub called Old Blue Post Hotel in Stafford.

He served in the Army in 1915, aged 31.
