= Bill Bradley (cyclist) =

English cyclist

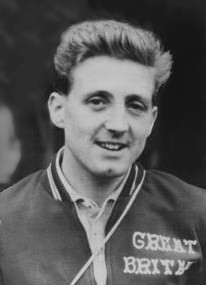
- Bill Bradley in 1960

Personal information
- Born: 30 March 1933 Wigan, England
- Died: 30 June 1997 (aged 64) Southport, England
- Height: 1.70 m (5 ft 7 in)
- Weight: 62 kg (137 lb)

Sport
- Sport: Cycling
- Club: Southport RCC

Bill Bradley (30 March 1933 – 30 June 1997) was a twice English National Road Race Champion, represented Great Britain in the 1960 Olympic Games in Rome,

== Biography ==
Bradley twice won the Tour of Britain Road Race Milk Race and until recently held the record for climbing the Grossglockner in the Tour of Austria. He remains the only rider to have won the Tour of Britain in two consecutive years. He rode for the Southport RCC throughout his career.

Bradley represented the England team in the road race during the 1958 British Empire and Commonwealth Games in Cardiff, Wales.

He died on 30 June 1997. In 2010, the Bill Bradley Memorial ride co-organised by his wife Joan Bradley was inaugurated.

== Palmarès ==
1956

- April: 1st Otley CC Mountain Trial
- July: 1st Lancaster CC 50 course record for Brock 1-58-22

1957

- May: Mountain Time Trail in 2-24-51. 2nd Stan Brittain @ 4.26, 3rd Alan Ramsbottom.
- July: 2nd Tour of Austria. Climbs Glossglockner in record time of 56min 53sec on stage 5 and is second at finish.
- August: World youth games Moscow – BLRC team.

Team Time Trial Gil Taylor, Bob Thorpe & Bill Bradley (Team of 3 – Mike England DNS) 3rd in 2-29-38 to the Russians with 2-23-16 and Bulgaria in 2-26-23; 10th Road race

- September: Sherwood 50 in 1-59-55. Wins Western 100 in 4-9-13 for SRCC club record (beaten in 1994)

1958

- Suspended till 30 June by N.C.U. for competing abroad without permission.
- Reprieved and picked by N.C.U. for the first time for team to ride Berlin Walsaw Prague. Wins Stage 11 Tabor-Brno (177 km; 5:02:46)
- June: Milk Race – Merseyside team. Shares yellow jersey after stages 2 and 3. Took yellow jersey after stage 9, but lost it the next day and eventually finished second at 45 seconds to Austrian Durlacher, 3rd K.O.M., 4th points, 2nd on stage 2 and 6th on stage 4. 2nd in Manx International to Henri de Wolf (Belgium). Wins 104 mile Solihull C.C. Empire Games selection Race.
- July: 10th representing England in the road race at the 1958 British Empire and Commonwealth Games in Cardiff, Wales.
- August: World Road Race at Gueux, nr Reims, 18’’ at 2–30 behind Schur of East Germany. 2nd in World Championships Revenge Road Race, East Germany.

1959

- May: Rides Berlin Walsaw Prague Peace Race, finished 37th overall, 3rd Team on G.C
- May /June: Wins first stage of Milk Race by 8 seconds and holds Yellow Jersey throughout, also winning 4th stage to Morecambe, King of the Mountains and Team Prize.
- June: 2nd in Manx International to Jim Hinds. 2nd in National Road Race to Bill Baty
- September: Wins 3rd stage in Tour of Sweden and holds Yellow jersey. Finished 12th overall.1st Tour of peaks Pro-Am.
- October: 6th in National Hill climb
- Awarded B.C.F. Val Waterhouse Gold Medal.

1960

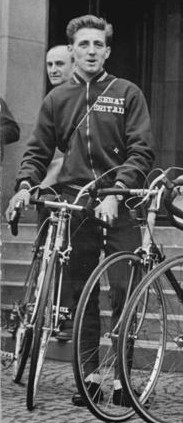
Bradley in 1960

- April: 2nd in Irwell Valley Road Race to Alan Ramsbottom. Only nine finishers in Olympic Training Race.
- May: Best English finisher at Peace Race finished in 10th place, 4th in K.O.M.
- June: Wins stages 2, 3 and 11 of Milk Race, King of Mountains 2nd Points classification and Overall winner. 2nd in Manx International.
- July: 1st National Road Race Title at Tyneside.
- August: 17th at World Road Race Championships at Sachenring, Germany.

14th in Olympic Team Time Trial, 36th at Olympic Road Race, 2nd in Hull International Awarded Val Waterhouse Gold Medal

1961

- May: 40th in Peace Race and 4th K.O.M.
- June: 11th in Milk Race 16th in Manx International.
- July: 20th overall in Tour de L’Avenir. 1st Vaux Tankard Road Race.
- August: 1st National Amateur Road Race Championships from George Bennet on Manx course.
- September: 43rd in World Road Race Championships at Berne, Switzerland.
- Awarded B.C.F. Val Waterhouse Gold Medal

1962

- June: 2nd in West Country 2 Day. 17th overall in Milk Race.
- July: 21st overall in Tour de L’ Avenir, 6th on stage 12. 1st Vaux Gold Tankard .

1963

- Turns Independent for Harry Quinn/Everyman Oil
- March: Premier 2 Day, stage win and 31st in Time Trial.
- April: 2nd Buxton Red Rose Pro-Am 2 day + 1 stage win. Won Circuit of Fylde.
- June: 2nd Northern Goldsmith Tankard / 13th Manx International Road Race
- August: 2nd circuit of Firis. 3rd London – York, Rode Tour de St Laurent in Canada.

1964

- Harry Quinn/ Everyman Oil.
- April: 2nd overall in Red Rose Grand Prix
- May: Wins G.P. de Gezira. Wins 2nd Stage in Tour of East Anglia and 3rd overall.
- June; 3rd London – Holyhead. 3rd Vaux International
- September: 2nd London York. 1st Tour of the Peak by 2min 48sec.
- Rode Tour of St Laurent in Canada

1965

- Independent for Falcon Cycles
- May: 1st Corona Tour of the South West 8 day. 7th in London Holyhead.
- June: 16th Manx professional Road Race. 10th I.O.M. Pro Race.
- September: 1st Leicestershire R.C. Milk Race. 4th in Criterium des Vainquers.

1973

- March: 1st VTTA 50 North Lancs in 2-4-24

3rd in Deeside 4 Day, 2nd on stage 1

- May: 2nd Birkenhead Park,
- June: Won Macclesfield Anniversary Road Race, 7th Merseyside Division Championships
- July: R.M.C. Vets Races, Plymouth Tour Visit. 2nd Criterium wins on the Hoe.

Wins club B.A.R. and improves 25 mile time to 58 mins. 3rd in Veterans National Road Race

1985

- 2nd Veterans National Hill Climb Championship

1986

- 3rd Snowdon Spring Road Race DLB Series

1994

- 2nd World Veterans Road Race in Derbyshire
