= Millie Robinson =

Manx woman racing cyclist (1924–1994)

Personal information
- Born: 3 December 1924 County Mayo, Ireland
- Died: 23 January 1994 (aged 69) Isle of Man

Cycling career
- Sport: Cycling
- Disciplines: Road and track
- Role: Rider

Major wins
- Road Tour de France Féminin (1955) Track Women's world hour record (1958)

Mildred Jessie "Millie" Robinson (3 December 1924 - 23 January 1994) was an Irish-born Manx road and track cyclist. A multiple-time British time trial and road racing champion in the 1950s, she also won the first Tour de France Féminin in 1955 and broke the women's world hour record in 1958.

== Early life ==
Robinson was one of nine children (six boys and three girls) born to Thomas and Sarah Robinson in Killala,County Mayo, Ireland. In 1935, the family relocated to Peel on the Isle of Man, where she attended Peel Clothworkers’ School. During World War II, Millie Robinson served as a Land Girl and met Ann King; the two became members of a cycling club Manx Viking Wheelers.

== Cycle racing career ==
From 1949, Robinson began riding seriously, competing in local grass track events, and in 1949, winning the first Manx 25-mile time trial organised for women by more than five minutes; the following year she won the first Ellan Vannin CC 25 during the Isle of Man Cycling Week. She was also regularly competing in time trials on the UK mainland, while also occasionally racing on the Isle of Man's only velodrome, at Onchan.

In late 1954, King and Robinson moved to Leeds, where Robinson drove a van for her brother's haulage business (she later moved to Nottingham working as a wheel builder for Raleigh). She won the first of three consecutive national 25-mile time trial titles in 1955.

Travelling to France in July 1955, she won the second stage and was overall winner of the three-stage Circuit Féminin Lyonnais-Auvergne, France's first women's stage race. In October 1955, in a team managed by Eileen Gray, Robinson was also the winner of the first Tour de France Féminin, then a five-day stage race held in Normandy, becoming the first Irish person to win the Tour de France, 32 years before Stephen Roche would follow in her tyre tracks in 1987. Robinson attacked alone to win the fourth stage to Gournay-en-Bray, finishing 13 seconds ahead of the peloton to take the overall lead. She then won the final stage, an individual time trial, to take overall victory from team-mate June Thackeray by half a minute. (While the Circuit Féminin Lyonnais-Auvergne was expanded, it was 30 years before the next Tour de France Féminin.)

In 1956 she won the first National Cyclists' Union-accredited road race national championship and an international road race in Harrogate.

In 1958, she broke the British women's hour record at the Fallowfield Stadium in Manchester, and on 25 September that year, broke the women's world hour record (plus the 10 km and 20 km records) at the Velodromo Vigorelli in Milan, achieving a distance of 39.718 km (24.680 mi), beating the old record by 1.149 km (0.714 mi). She also won the 1958 British Best All-Rounder time trial competition, receiving the award in front of a 6,000 strong audience at London's Royal Albert Hall.

Overlooked for the 1958 world championships, she competed at the 1959 UCI Road World Championships in the women's road race event, finishing 7th, two places behind fellow Briton Beryl Burton. She had earlier been second in the 1959 British women's road race championship.

== Later life ==
In 1960, Robinson returned to the Isle of Man. She worked in a sign-writing and poster-making business in Douglas until the 1970s, then later worked as a prison warden on the women's wing of Victoria Road Prison. Diagnosed with cancer in the 1990s, she died on 23 January 1994, aged 69.
