= Lorna Webb =

English cyclist (born 1983)

Personal information
- Full name: Lorna jo Webb
- Born: 26 May 1983 (age 43) England

Cycling career
- Sport: Cycling

Amateur team
- Bromsgrove Olympique Cycling Club

Professional teams
- 2002: Team PowerBar
- 2003: Life Repair Group Pro Cycling Team
- 2006: Team FBUK
- 2007: Rapha - Condor

Lorna Webb (born 26 May 1983) is an English professional cyclist from Walsall, West Midlands, born in Runcorn. She represented Great Britain twice at the World Championships in Plouay and Lisbon as a junior.

== Palmarès ==
2003
1st Overall Jo Brunton Women's RR Series 2003

1st Moscow Gallops Jo Brunton RR

1st Michelin National Women's Team Road Race
2nd Women's Omnium, Milton Keynes
3rd Women's Omnium, Halesowen

2005
2nd 500m TT, British National Track Championships
2nd Sprint, British National Track Championships

2006
2nd British National Road Race Championships
1st Cheshire Classic Women's Road Race
3rd Corswarem (BEL)
1st Burcht (BEL)
3rd Circuit de Wallonie (BEL)
3rd Helfaut (FRA)
