= Dave Nie =

British

Personal information
- Nationality: British (English)
- Born: 29 December 1940 (age 84) Bentley, England

Sport
- Sport: Cycling
- Event: Road
- Club: Dragon Road Club

Dave Nie (born 29 December 1940), is a male former cyclist and Cyclo-cross rider who competed for England.

== Biography ==
In 1964, Nie rode cyclo-cross for the Velo Club Sacchi and road raced for the Dragon Club. He was an instrument maker in Heston by profession.

Nie represented the England team in the road race, finishing in a very respectable eighth place, at the 1966 British Empire and Commonwealth Games in Kingston, Jamaica.

Nie was the 1971 British national champion in the Madison with Geoff Wiles and was national runner-up in the 1969 elite road race.

He was a member of the Chequers London and Dragon Road Clubs before turning professional where he rode for Holdsworth-Campognolo.
