= Jerry Waters =

British racing cyclist

Personal information
- Full name: Jerry Waters
- Born: 3 April 1915 London
- Died: 31 January 1997 (aged 81)

Cycling career
- Sport: Cycling
- Discipline: Road
- Role: Rider

Amateur teams
- Morgan CC: 1940
- South London RC: 1944
- Kentish Wheelers: 1976

Jerry Waters (born Reginald Waters, 3 April 1915 - died 31 January 1997) was one of the top British racing cyclists of the 1940s. He came second to Ernie Clements in the National Cyclists' Union's national road championship in 1946. He continued competing as a veteran.

Brother of Wilfred Waters, cyclist & Olympic bronze medalist.

== Palmarès ==
1946
2nd National road championship (NCU)
