= Hamish Haynes =

English cyclist

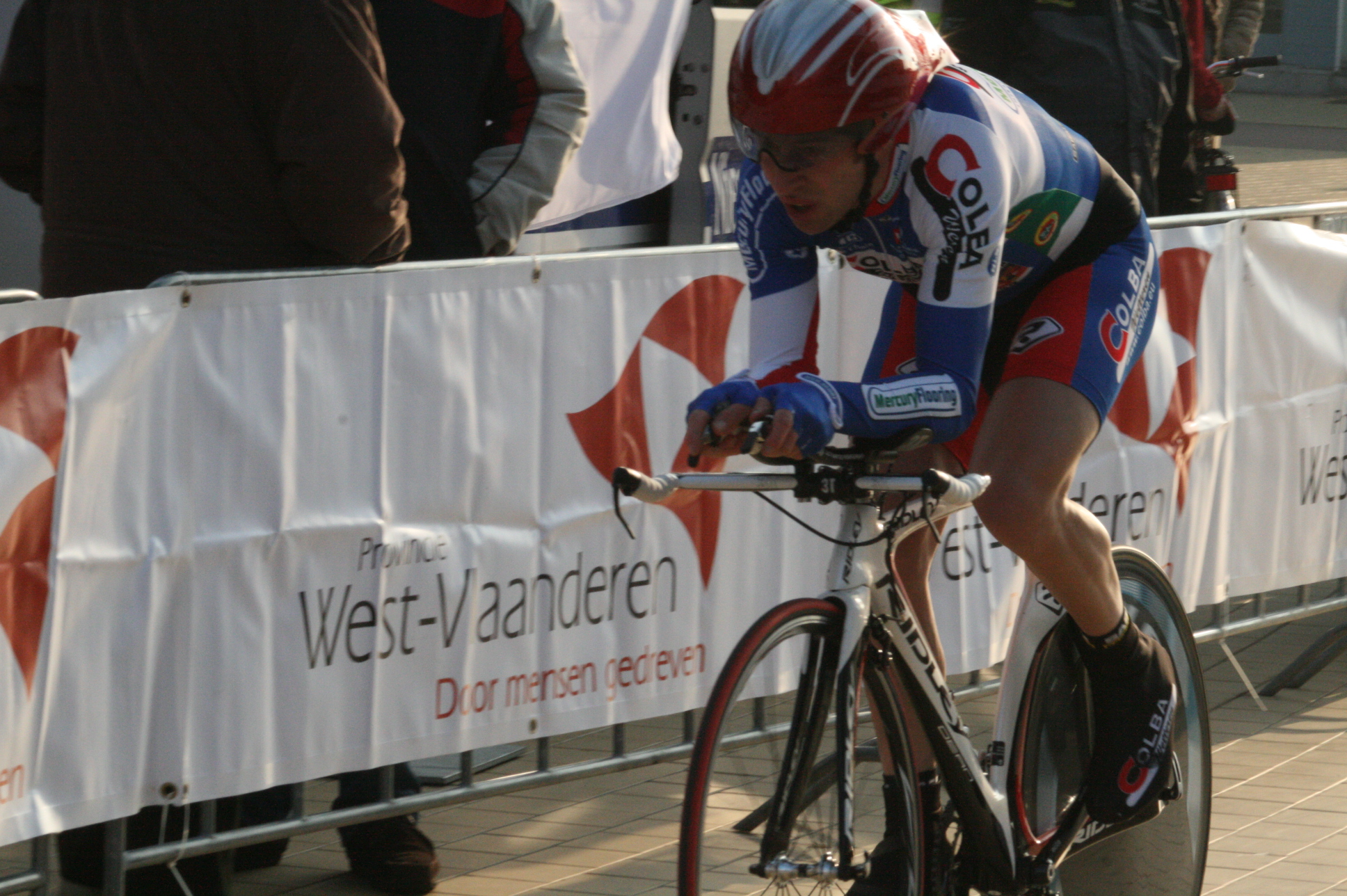
- Hamish Haynes in 2011

Personal information
- Full name: Hamish Robert Haynes
- Born: 5 March 1974 (age 52) Stalybridge, England, United Kingdom

Cycling career
- Sport: Cycling
- Current team: Colba-Superano Ham
- Discipline: Road
- Role: Rider

Amateur team
- 2000: Team Cyclingnews.com

Professional teams
- 2003: Maestro-Nella
- 2004–2005: Cyclingnews.com
- 2006: Jartazi–7Mobile
- 2007: DFL-Cyclingnews-Litespeed
- 2011–: Colba-Mercury

Hamish Robert Haynes (born 5 March 1974 in Stalybridge) is an English road racing cyclist. He was British champion in 2006.

== Major results ==
2003
1st Stage 5 Arden Challenge
2004
1st Grand Prix Criquielion
2005
1st Grote 1-MeiPrijs
1st Stage 2 Tour de Hongrie
2006
1st Road race, National Road Championships
2007
3rd Road race, National Road Championships

Sporting positions
Preceded by Russell Downing	British National Road Race Champion; 2006	Succeeded by David Millar
