= Dave Rollinson =

British cyclist

Personal information
- Nationality: British (English)
- Born: 11 January 1947 (age 79) Liverpool, England
- Height: 180 cm (5 ft 11 in)
- Weight: 66 kg (146 lb)

Sport
- Club: Liverpool Mercury RC

David Rollinson (born 11 January 1947) is a former British international cyclist who competed at the 1968 Summer Olympics..

== Biography ==
At the 1968 Olympic Games in Mexico City, Rollinson participated in the road race.

He represented the England team at the 1970 British Commonwealth Games in Edinburgh, Scotland, where he participated in the road race.
