= Linda Gornall =

British cyclist

Personal information
- Born: 21 March 1964 (age 62) Preston, England

Cycling career
- Sport: Cycling

Linda Gornall (born 21 March 1964) is an English former cyclist. Gornall competed in the women's road race event at the 1984 Summer Olympics.

She represented England in the road race, at the 1990 Commonwealth Games in Auckland, New Zealand.

Her brother Alan Gornall was also an England international cyclist.
