= Tony Hewson =

British cyclist (1934–2020)

Personal information
- Full name: Anthony Hewson
- Nickname: Tony
- Born: 26 January 1934 England; United Kingdom
- Died: October 2020 (aged 86)

Cycling career
- Sport: Cycling
- Disciplines: Road & Track
- Role: Rider
- Rider type: Pursuit/Endurance

Amateur team
- c. 1950–1956: –

Professional teams
- 1957–1960: Independent
- 1961: Liberia-Grammont

Major wins
- 1955 – Tour of Britain; 1955 – Tour of Scotland; 1954 – Viking Trophy race 1951 – National Junior Road Champion

Anthony 'Tony' Hewson (born Sheffield, England, 26 January 1934 - died October 2020) was a British racing cyclist who rode the Tour de France and, as an amateur, won the Tour of Britain in 1955. He was critical of the way, as he saw it, British cycling has been let down by its administrators.

== Background ==
Hewson started cycling at 13 when his elder brother, John, asked him for a ride into Derbyshire. He had a heavy bicycle with a Sturmey-Archer hub gear, whereas his brother was already racing with Sheffield Central cycling club. He said:

I had long wondered about cyclists and their long, mysterious trips into the countryside. What was it about this sport that could be so engrossing? I was about to find out! The day was hot, the hills steep and long, and though I thought of myself as a fit young man, 70km for an inexperienced cyclist was a great distance... My reward was to realise the beauty of that rugged, unspoiled limestone landscape that I was viewing for the first time. Something else: everywhere we went we were greeted by other cyclists. It was like belonging to some secret brotherhood.

== Amateur career ==
He joined a racing club affiliated to the British League of Racing Cyclists, an organisation set up to introduce massed racing on the open road. He became national junior road champion in 1951, a year in which he won three races and came second in five others.

He continued racing during national service from 1952 to 1954. He won the Viking Trophy race in the Isle of Man in 1954 and the fifth stage of the Circuit of Britain, alternative to the Tour of Britain. He won the Tour of Britain and the Tour of Scotland in 1955.

== Semi-professional career ==
Hewson became an independent, or semi-professional in 1957, racing in Britain, Belgium and France . He said:

Races and sponsors were increasingly hard to find for independents such as John Andrews and myself. We determined to give up our jobs and try our luck on the Continent to see if we could emulate the success of Brian Robinson. In February 1957 we commenced training and racing on the Côte d'Azur. I had two third places, which gave me heart. The best of these was in the Tour du Var. When the early season was over, we moved to Belgium, where I managed to win a race. But we were running short of money and had to return to England in May.

He, John Andrews and Vic Sutton returned to the Côte d'Azur in February 1958, living in an old ambulance bought for £75. It became a chicken house the following season. In 1959 Hewson rode the Tour de France. He started ill-prepared after a six-week chest infection. He said:

My plan was simply to ride myself back to health over the first week of flat stages. All went well for two stages and I kept in the bunch without too much difficulty. But fate had other ideas. Crossing Charleroi during stage three, an attack had gone off the front and the pace was high. My front wheel fell between the bars of a drain in the gutter and buckled. The wheel change took for ever and, though two team-mates waited for me, the whole caravan had gone by before we started our pursuit. It lasted all day, through the Hell of the North, to Roubaix, where we finished exhausted and just inside the time limit.

On stage seven, to La Rochelle, Hewson was told to wait for a team-mate, Retwig, riding with him in an international team. Retwig had punctured.

It was suicidal and I knew it, but I waited nonetheless. Retwig was already well adrift and he abandoned soon afterwards. I chased alone for a while but the situation was hopeless. There was no chance of finishing inside the time limit and, in any case, a long time trial of 180km is not the best way to prepare for the mountain stages to follow. I joined Retwig in the wagon balai

Hewson and Sutton were taken on in 1960 by the Liberia-Grammont professional team led by Henry Anglade, but still riding as independents. Sutton described the venture as a short-lived disaster which reached its low when he brought down half the team when he fell on loose gravel on a bend – "for which I was blamed entirely."

Demoralisation set in and Hewson decided to quit. He was asked to join another team for the Tour de France but declined.

== Retirement and assessment ==
Hewson stopped racing when he was 26. He said: "I felt surprisingly old and wanted to seize other opportunities before it became too late. I knew I had other talents outside the sporting field waiting to be exploited. I had neither the ability, health nor luck to ride much higher in the sphere of cycle racing."

Ramon Minovi, writing for the Association of British Cycling Coaches, said:

Neither Sutton nor Andrews really lived up to their talent, either. All three could have achieved so much more in cycle racing: Andrews finished 13th in the world road championship, Sutton's climbing prowess was praised by Coppi. The reasons why riders like this seemed unable to capitalise on their talents and achievements are complex, but much of it has to do with the British handicap (in road racing) of starting not at the bottom of the ladder, but miles away from it. Despite his abilities (a Tour of Britain win, a finish in the Peace Race, wins and places all over France) you feel that Hewson was never going to make a long career of it. He seems not to have had the robust constitution which Sean Yates insists is essential to withstand the enormous work-load of professional road racing. It's no surprise when he tells his mate, 'I just keep thinking how hard it is.'

Hewson remained bitter about the way British cycling had abandoned massed racing and the infighting between the British League of Racing Cyclists and the National Cyclists Union that followed its return. He said:

British road racing has no body. That is the problem: no permanent race structure to speak of on the continental model, just a series of stuttering starts and stops. With no bankable tradition, low prestige and low expectations are inevitable (where would tennis be without Wimbledon?). Consequently, it enjoys little respect or influence outside the sport. Two opportunities to create such a body have been lost. In the 1890s Frederick Thomas Bidlake and his cronies surrendered to the horse and carriage lobby and abandoned road racing in favour of time-trialling. They touched the forelock and admitted to their lowly place in society. They could not possibly have foreseen the dire consequences of that decision. At a stroke it severed us from the Continent and all the benefits for cycling and cyclists here that would have accrued.

After retiring from cycling, Hewson studied English Language at the University of Leeds, graduating in 1966.

In November 2014, Hewson suffered serious head injuries when he was knocked down by a car whilst riding near his home in Shropshire. He was never able to ride his bike again and died of a spontaneous sudden brain haemorrhage on 29 September 2020 (possibly attributable to his 2014 accident head trauma) in Hereford hospital, leaving behind a wife and two grown-up children. As part of his legacy, Tony Hewson wrote two successful books about his racing career and cycling short stories.
