= Sid Barras =

English cyclist

Personal information
- Full name: Sidney Barras
- Nickname: Super Sid
- Born: 3 April 1948 (age 78) England; Great Britain

Cycling career
- Sport: Cycling
- Discipline: Road
- Role: Rider
- Rider type: Sprinter

Professional teams
- 1970: Bantel - Raleigh
- 1971–1973: Bantel
- 1974: TI - Raleigh
- 1975–1977: Bantel
- 1978: Viking - Campagnolo
- 1979: Carlton - Weinmann
- 1980: Weinmann - Chicken
- 1981: Coventry Eagle - Campagnolo
- 1982–1984: Falcon - Campagnolo
- 1985–1986: Moducel
- 1987: Watertech - Dawes

Major wins
- British National Road Race Champion (1979)

Sid Barras (born 3 April 1948) is an English former professional road racing cyclist from Middlesbrough, North Yorkshire. He was a professional for 18 years. One of Britain's foremost racing cyclists in the 1970s and 1980s with 380 wins, in 18 years as a professional. He was national champion three times and won a stage of the Tour of Majorca and in the 1973 Tour of Switzerland.

In 1999, Barras was directeur sportif of the British UCI division 3 team, Men's Health. He was manager of Recycling.co.uk in 2007.

He won the national over-50 championship in 2008. In 2009, he was inducted into the British Cycling Hall of Fame.

Barras is father of former professional cyclist, Tom Barras.

== Palmarès ==
1970
4th British National Road Race Championships (Professional)
1st London – Holyhead

1971
2nd British National Road Race Championships (Professional)
2nd Tom Simpson Memorial (Harworth)
2nd British National Stayers Championships

1973
1st Stage 10, Tour de Suisse
1st Tom Simpson Memorial (Harworth)

1974
1st Tom Simpson Memorial (Harworth)

1976
2nd British National Road Race Championships (Professional)

1977
1st London – Holyhead
5th British National Road Race Championships (Professional)

1979
1st (United Kingdom) British National Road Race Championships (Professional)
1st (United Kingdom) British National Circuit Race Championships (Professional)

1980
1st Tom Simpson Memorial (Harworth)
2nd British National Road Race Championships (Professional)

1981
4th British National Road Race Championships (Professional)
