= Bernadette Swinnerton =

English racing cyclist

Personal information
- Born: 12 August 1951 (age 75) Fenton, Stoke-on-Trent, England

Cycling career
- Sport: Cycling
- Discipline: track
- Role: Rider
Medal record
Representing Great Britain
Women’s Cycling
UCI Road World Championships
Silver medal – second place	1969	Road race
British National Track Championships
Gold medal – first place	1968	sprint
Gold medal – first place	1969	sprint
Gold medal – first place	1970	sprint
Gold medal – first place	1971	sprint

Bernadette Swinnerton is a former English racing cyclist. She came second in the 1969 Road World Championship road race in Czechoslovakia, 1m 10s behind Audrey McElmury.

== Cycling ==
In addition to the silver medal at the 1969 UCI Road World Championships she won four British National Track Championships in the sprint event. She was also National grass track champion in 1968, 1970, 1971.

== Family ==
Bernardette Swinnerton was born in Fenton, Stoke-on-Trent during 1951, the eldest of seven children. The Swinnerton family were a cycling family, Swinnerton Cycles was founded in 1915, in Victoria Road, Fenton, Stoke-on-Trent. Roy Swinnerton (1925-2013 and a national grass champion in 1956) and his wife Doris (née Salt) took over the shop in 1956 and set up a cycling club called Stoke ACCS during 1970.

Bernadette's brother Paul was a three times British track champion, her sister Catherine was a two times British road race champion, Margaret, Mark and Bernard were all British internationals and Frances also competed for the club.

== Career ==
Bernardette Swinnerton retired after 40 years of teaching, spending the last 17 years of her career as a headteacher in Blythe Bridge, Stoke-on-Trent. She has 3 children and 4 grandchildren.

Brno. Czechoslovakia

1969
2nd Road race, UCI Road World Championships
