= Dudley Hayton =

British cyclist

Personal information
- Full name: Maurice Dudley Hayton
- Born: 23 April 1953 (age 73) Shipley, West Yorkshire, England

Cycling career
- Sport: Cycling
- Current team: Saint Piran
- Discipline: Road
- Role: Rider (retired); Directeur sportif

Professional teams
- 1978–1979: Holdsworth–Campagnolo
- 1985: ANC–Ayel–Gipiemme
- 1987: Ever Ready–Ammaco

Managerial team
- 2021–: Saint Piran

Maurice Dudley Hayton (born 23 April 1953) is a British former cyclist, who competed in the individual road race and team time trial events at the 1976 Summer Olympics. He currently works as a directeur sportif for UCI Continental team Saint Piran.
