= Alex Coutts =

Scottish cyclist (born 1983)

Personal information
- Born: 25 September 1983 (age 43) Gorebridge, Midlothian, Scotland

Cycling career
- Sport: Cycling
- Current team: Retired
- Discipline: Road
- Role: Rider

Professional teams
- 2003: Team Endurasport.com–Principia
- 2004–2005: Flanders–Afin.com
- 2006: DFL–Cyclingnews–Litespeed
- 2007: Babes Only–Villapark Lingemeer–Flanders
- 2008: Giant Asia Racing Team
- 2009: Heraklion–Nessebar
- 2010–2012: Giant Asia Racing Team
- 2014: RTS–Santic Racing Team

Alex Coutts (born 25 September 1983) is a Scottish former professional road cyclist.

== Major results ==
2000
1st Overall Junior Tour of Wales

1st Stage 3

2001
1st Overall Junior Tour of Wales

1st Stages 1 & 2

1st Stage 1 (ITT) Junior Tour of Ireland
2005
2nd Road race, National Under-23 Road Championships
9th Overall Tour de Serbie
2007
8th Grand Prix Cristal Energie
9th Overall Tour de Serbie
2008
1st Overall Tour of Thailand
2009
10th Overall Tour de Taiwan
2010
7th Overall Tour of Singkarak
2011
7th Overall Le Tour de Filipinas
