= William Nickson =

British cyclist

Personal information
- Born: 30 January 1953 (age 73) Liverpool, England

Cycling career
- Sport: Cycling

Amateur team
- East Liverpool Wheelers

Professional teams
- 1977-1978: TI Raleigh - Campagnolo
- 1978-1986: Falcon Cycles

Major wins
- 1974 Manx International; 1974 National Amateur Road Race Championship; 1975 Manx International; 1976 Milk Race; 1976 Lincoln Grand Prix; 1981 National Professional Road Race Championship

William Nickson (born 30 January 1953) is a British former cyclist and 1981 British National Road Race Champion. He won the 1976 Milk Race whilst riding for the Great Britain "A" team. He competed in the individual road race and team time trial events at the 1976 Summer Olympics. He also rode in the 1977 Tour de France.

In the 1977 Tour de France he was one of a group of 30 riders that were sent home after finishing beyond the time limit in the toughest mountain stage Chamonix - Alpe d'Huez. Among those riders were points classification second Rik van Linden, stage winners Klaus-Peter Thaler and Patrick Sercu, and his teammates Aad van den Hoek and Piet van Katwijk.
