= Maria Blower =

English cyclist

Personal information
- Born: 21 August 1964 (age 62) Leicester, England

Cycling career
- Sport: Cycling

Maria Blower (born 21 August 1964) is a female retired English road racing cyclist. She competed in the road race at the 1984 Summer Olympics, finishing 29th, and at the 1988 Summer Olympics, finishing 6th.

She also represented England in the road race, at the 1990 Commonwealth Games in Auckland, New Zealand.
