= David Cook (cyclist) =

British cyclist

Personal information
- Born: 12 January 1969 (age 57) Darlington, England

Cycling career
- Sport: Cycling

David Cook (born 12 January 1969) is a British former cyclist. Cook competed in the individual road race at the 1992 Summer Olympics. He also represented England in the road race, at the 1990 Commonwealth Games in Auckland, New Zealand.
