= Brian Jolly =

British cyclist

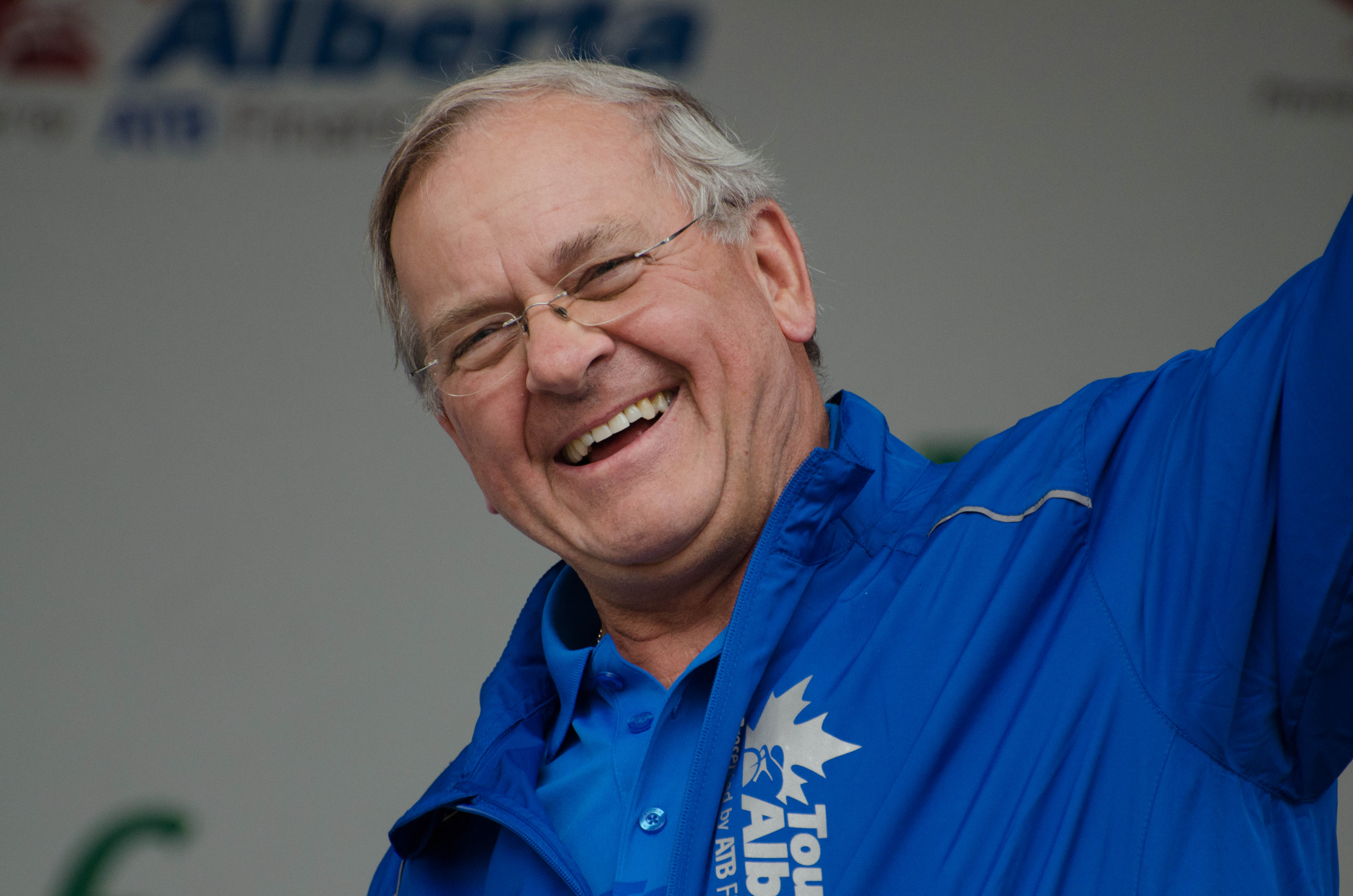
- Jolly at the 2014 Tour of Alberta

Personal information
- Born: 1 March 1946 (age 80) Sheffield, England

Cycling career
- Sport: Cycling

Brian Jolly (born 1 March 1946) is a former British cyclist. He competed in the individual road race at the 1968 Summer Olympics.
