= Colin Lewis =

Welsh cyclist (1942–2022)

Personal information
- Born: 27 July 1942 Abertysswg, Wales
- Died: 4 March 2022 (aged 79) Bovey Tracey, England

Cycling career
- Sport: Cycling
- Discipline: Road
- Role: Rider

Amateur team
- 1958–1966: Mid-Devon Cycling Club

Professional teams
- 1967–1969: Mackeson-Condor
- 1970–1974: Holdsworth-Campagnolo

Major wins
- British National Road Race Champion (1967, 1968); 250 victories including 38 professional The Golden Wheel Trophy; 1968 - Linz am Rhine

Colin Lewis (27 July 1942 – 4 March 2022) was a British racing cyclist. He started racing at 19 and rode the Milk Race in 1960, finishing 7th.

== Cycling career ==
Lewis represented Britain in the Tour de l'Avenir and the world championships at San Sebastian. He came 25th, the best British rider, in the individual road race at the 1964 Summer Olympics.

He represented the 1966 Welsh team at the 1966 British Empire and Commonwealth Games in Kingston, Jamaica, participating in the road race and pursuit events.

After racing in France he received offers to join the AC Boulogne-Billancourt in Paris, often a stepping stone to professional teams and especially to Peugeot or to ride for a smaller British team, Mackeson-Condor. The sponsors were a brewing company and a London bicycle shop. He turned pro for £4 per week. Average weekly pay in Britain at the time was about £25. In 1967 he finished the Tour de France 84th and won the national road championship. Mackeson-Condor doubled his pay. In 1968 he won the road championship again, the only rider to win in successive years. He moved to another team, Holdsworth-Campagnolo, in 1969 and stayed there until he retired from professional racing in 1975.

In the 1967 Tour de France, Lewis rode with and shared a room with Tom Simpson, who died during the race while climbing Mont Ventoux. Lewis said:

"On the climb, I heard that Tom had fallen off about a kilometre from the summit, then I saw a commotion and saw him lying on the ground. I shouted to Alex [Taylor, the team manager] 'What's up?' but he told me to go on and that everything was all right. I was expecting him to catch me on the descent and that we would work together. I was tucked up in bed after the stage, feeling pretty rough, when I heard the news. Barry (Hoban) came into my room and said 'Tom's dead.' I couldn't believe it, he was so lighthearted before the start."

The biggest lesson he learned on the Tour was that the ability to suffer for prolonged periods, Lewis said that this was the difference between British and Continental professionals at the time.

Lewis was the last Welshman to ride the Tour de France in 1968 until Geraint Thomas in 2007.

He said British professional racing scene was good but there were too few hard races and too much "chasing round straw bales all the time", a reference to races held up and down straight roads, often on seafronts. Lewis said the promise of development exited with companies such as Yellow Pages, V&G Insurance and Redifusion sponsoring races, although the deals never lasted long, frequently sending them back to square one looking for new sponsors.

Lewis had 250 victories, 38 professional, including the Golden Wheel Trophy and the Linz am Rhine.

== Other work and personal life ==
Lewis was born in Abertysswg, Wales on 27 July 1942. He opened a cycle shop in 1976. He was manager of Eastway Cycle Circuit in Hackney, London, and spent seven years as training director at the South East Centre of Excellence.

Lewis lived in Devon, and served as president of Mid-Devon Cycling Club. His wife, Pam, died in August 2010. He died from cancer in Bovey Tracey, on 4 March 2022, at the age of 79.

== Palmarès ==
1960
7th Milk Race
1966
25th Individual road race, Commonwealth Games
1967
1st (United Kingdom) British National Road Race Championships
1968
1st (United Kingdom) British National Road Race Championships
Linz am Rhine
?
Golden Wheel Trophy Herne Hill
