= Manx Trophy =

Race details
- Date: June
- Region: Isle of Man
- English name: Manx Trophy
- Discipline: Road race
- Competition: Premier Calendar
- Type: Single day race

History
- First edition: 1936
- Editions: c. 54
- First winner: Charles Holland (GBR)
- Most wins: Jean Baldessari (FRA); Seamus Elliott (IRL); Tom Simpson (GBR); Paul Curran (GBR) (2 times)
- Most recent: Matthew Holmes (GBR)

The Manx Trophy or Isle of Man International Road Race is a bicycle road race run annually on the Isle of Man. In the 1960s the race attracted the world's top professional cyclists including Fausto Coppi, Jacques Anquetil and Eddy Merckx.

The race was a feature of the Isle of Man cycling festival, an annual event which ran from 1936 to 2003 and was started by journalist and cycling enthusiast Curwen Clague. The first festival included a massed-start road race (a rarity in mainland Britain at the time but allowed in the Isle of Man, a self-governing crown dependency) which featured the top riders of the day. Despite closed roads the race saw many crashes and only a few riders finished. The first winner was Charles Holland of Birmingham, later one of the first two Englishmen to ride the Tour de France.

The first event involved riders racing a single lap of the famous TT circuit of 37.75 miles (60.75 km). The course runs from Douglas to Ramsey then climbs for 5 mi (8 km) to a high point on the mountain of Snaefell at 1,384 ft (422 m) before descending to Douglas. The distance was later increased to two and then three laps (113 mi or 182 km).

The Manx Trophy was reintroduced in April 2016 as a one-day race by Manx International Cycling Ltd, named the Manx International Cycling GP, forming part of the British Cycling Spring Cup over 3 laps of the TT Mountain Circuit, and in 2017 hosted the National Road Race Championships where Steve Cummings won both the National Time Trial and Road Race events. In 2019 the event was relaunched as a 3 day stage race forming part of the HSBC UK|British Cycling National Mens Road Race Series.

== Winners (not a complete list) ==
=== Manx Trophy/Isle of Man International Road Race ===
Year	Country	Rider	Team
1936	Great Britain	Charles Holland	Midland Cycling and Athletic Club
1937	Great Britain	Jack Fancourt	Yorkshire RC
1938	France	Pierre Chazaud	
1939	Great Britain	Bill Messer	
1940–45	No race due to World War II		
1946	France	Jean Baldassari	
1947	France	Jean Baldassari	
1948	Great Britain	Alan Barnes	
1949	Great Britain	Desmond Robinson	
1956	Italy	Ercole Baldini	
1957	No race		
1958	Belgium	Henri De Wolf	
1959	Ireland	Seamus Elliott	Helyett–Leroux–Fynsec–Hutchinson
1960	France	André Darrigade	Helyett–Leroux–Fynsec–Hutchinson
1961	Netherlands	Jo de Roo	Helyett–Fynsec–Hutchinson
1962	Germany	Rudi Altig	Saint-Raphaël–Helyett–Hutchinson
1963	Great Britain	Tom Simpson	Peugeot–BP–Englebert
1964	Ireland	Seamus Elliott	Saint-Raphaël–Gitane–Dunlop
1965	France	Jacques Anquetil	Ford France–Gitane
1966	Netherlands	Wim Schepers	Caballero
1967	Great Britain	Tom Simpson	Peugeot–BP–Michelin
1968	Great Britain	Arthur Metcalfe	Carlton–B.M.B.
1969	Netherlands	Jan Harings	Caballero
1970	Great Britain	Barry Hoban	Sonolor–Lejeune
1971	France	Bernard Bourreau	
1972–74	No race		
1975	Great Britain	William Nickson	
1976	Great Britain	Paul Sherwen	Altrincham Road Club - Rotalac Plastics
1977	No race		
1978	Great Britain	Steve Lawrence	
1979	Isle of Man	Steve Joughin	Manx Road Club
1980	Great Britain	John Herety	
1981	No race		
1982	Great Britain	Joseph Waugh	
1983	Switzerland	Hans Reis	
1984	Great Britain	Mark Walsham	
1985	Great Britain	Paul Curran	
1986	New Zealand	Brian Fowler	
1987	Great Britain	Darryl Webster	
1988	Great Britain	Paul Curran	
1989	Great Britain	Wayne Randle	
1990	Great Britain	Tim Hall	Liverpool Mercury CC
1991	France	Christophe Mengin	
1992	Ireland	David Hourigan	
1993	Great Britain	Brian Smith	Banana–Falcon
1994	Great Britain	Simeon Hempsall	Choice Accountancy
1995	Great Britain	Robert Millar (Note: The race was run as the British professional road race championship.)	Le Groupement
1996	Ireland	David McCann	
1997	France	Christophe Morel	
1998	Great Britain	John Tanner	Brite
1999	Great Britain	David Millar	Cofidis
2000	Great Britain	Julian Winn	Elite 2/3
2001	Great Britain	Matthew Stephens	Linda McCartney–Jacob’s Creek–Jaguar
2002	Ireland	David McCann	Volksbank–Ideal
2003	Great Britain	Mark Lovatt	

=== Manx International Cycling GP ===
Year	Country	Rider	Team
2016	Great Britain	Ian Bibby	NFTO
2017	Great Britain	Steve Cummings (Note: The race was run as the HSBC UK British Cycling National Road Championships.)	Team Dimension Data
2019	Great Britain	Matthew Holmes (Note: The race was run as the Cycle360 Manx International Stage Race.)	Madison Genesis
