= List of Maltese football transfers winter 2018–19 =

The 2018–19 winter transfer window for Maltese football transfers opened on 1 January and closed on 31 January. Additionally, players without a club may join at any time and clubs may sign players on loan at any time. This list includes transfers featuring at least one Premier League or First Division club which were completed after the end of the summer 2018 transfer window and before the end of the 2018–19 winter window.

== Transfers ==
Date	Name	Moving from	Moving to	Fee
18 December 2018	(Argentina) Gastón Ezequiel Cesani	(Italy) Nerostellati 1910	Floriana	Undisclosed
18 December 2018	(Argentina) Ulises Jesus Arias	(Argentina) Sarmiento	Floriana	Undisclosed
23 December 2018	(Cameroon) Justin Mengolo	(Romania) Astra Giurgiu	Gżira United	Undisclosed
28 December 2018	(Brazil) Juninho Cabral	Floriana		Released
29 December 2018	Edward Herrera	Birkirkara	Floriana	Undisclosed
31 December 2018	(Nigeria) Uchenna Umeh	Birkirkara		Released
31 December 2018	(Bosnia and Herzegovina) Muamer Svraka	(Estonia) FCI Levadia	Birkirkara	Undisclosed
2 January 2019	Clayton Failla	Floriana	Birkirkara	Undisclosed
3 January 2019	(Bosnia and Herzegovina) Aleksandar Kosorić	(Latvia) Spartaks Jūrmala	Balzan	Undisclosed
3 January 2019	Duane Bonnici	Naxxar Lions	Mosta	Undisclosed
3 January 2019	Stefano Zampa	Żebbuġ Rangers	Marsa	Undisclosed
4 January 2019	(Czech Republic) Luboš Adamec	Qormi		Released
4 January 2019	Michael Camilleri	Qormi		Released
4 January 2019	(South Korea) Seo-In Kim	Qormi		Released
4 January 2019	Mark Gauci	Marsa		Released
4 January 2019	Melvin Busuttil	Marsa		Released
4 January 2019	Craig Abdilla	Mosta		Released
4 January 2019	(Nigeria) Adebayo Ademilua	St. Lucia	Munxar Falcons	Loan
5 January 2019	(Brazil) Alex da Paixão Alves	Balzan	(Saudi Arabia) Al Akhdoud Club	Undisclosed
5 January 2019	Paul Fenech	Birkirkara	Balzan	Undisclosed
6 January 2019	(England) Philip Taylor	Fgura United		Released
6 January 2019	Kirsten Abela	Kalkara	Hibernians	Loan return
7 January 2019	Mark Gauci		Fgura United	Free
7 January 2019	(Nigeria) David Boham Habiganuchi	(Italy) Sermoneta Calcio	Balzan	Undisclosed
8 January 2019	Llywelyn Cremona	Birkirkara	Gudja United	Loan
8 January 2019	Myles Beerman	Birkirkara	(Scotland) Rangers	Loan return
8 January 2019	Johann Bezzina	Hibernians	Birkirkara	Undisclosed
8 January 2019	(Brazil) Jorge Pereira da Silva	Gżira United	Birkirkara	Undisclosed
8 January 2019	(Brazil) Rômulo Silva Santos		Senglea Athletic	Free
8 January 2019	(Brazil) Francisco Diego Venancio da Silva		Senglea Athletic	Undisclosed
8 January 2019	(Serbia) Marko Batinica		Senglea Athletic	Free
8 January 2019	(Serbia) Nikola Mitić		Senglea Athletic	Free
8 January 2019	(Japan) Yudai Miyamoto	Balzan	Senglea Athletic	Loan
8 January 2019	Jonathan Debono	Mqabba	Gudja United	Undisclosed
8 January 2019	(Brazil) Wellington Petinha		Qormi	Free
8 January 2019	(Brazil) Mateus Regis		Qormi	Free
8 January 2019	(Cameroon) Cédric Mandjeck	(Oman) Al Rustaq	Żejtun Corinthians	Undisclosed
8 January 2019	Dylan Micallef	Senglea Athletic	Mqabba	Undisclosed
8 January 2019	(Brazil) Gregori Braga		Żebbuġ Rangers	Undisclosed
8 January 2019	(France) Sofian Domoraud Operi	(Switzerland) Allschwil	Gżira United	Undisclosed
8 January 2019	(Brazil) Igor Rocha	St. Lucia	Żebbuġ Rangers	Loan
9 January 2019	Brandon Muscat	Birkirkara	Żebbuġ Rangers	Loan
9 January 2019	Dylan Micallef	Marsa	Mqabba	Undisclosed
9 January 2019	Neil Micallef	Senglea Athletic	Mqabba	Undisclosed
9 January 2019	Ryan Previ	Vittoriosa Stars		Released
9 January 2019	Fredrick Tabone	Gudja United		Released
9 January 2019	Karl Pulo	St. Andrews	Gżira United	Loan return
10 January 2019	(Austria) Marco Sahanek	(Austria) Floridsdorfer AC	Hibernians	Undisclosed
10 January 2019	(Morocco) El Mehdi Sidqy		Senglea Athletic	Free
10 January 2019	(Montenegro) Petar Orlandić	Birkirkara		Released
10 January 2019	(Switzerland) Milan Basrak	Birkirkara		Released
10 January 2019	Julian Zammit	Sirens		Released
10 January 2019	(South Korea) Park Changhoon		Naxxar Lions	Free
10 January 2019	Ryan Previ		Sirens	Free
10 January 2019	Jake Lovegrove		Marsa	Free
10 January 2019	Fredrick Tabone		Mqabba	Free
11 January 2019	(Argentina) Juan Cruz Gill	Valletta	Tarxien Rainbows	Loan
11 January 2019	Russell Fenech	Valletta	Sirens	Loan
11 January 2019	(Brazil) Lucas dos Santos Santana		Qormi	Undisclosed
11 January 2019	(Italy) Antonio Rozzi	(Italy) Lazio	Qormi	Undisclosed
11 January 2019	(France) Freud Codjo Gnindokponou		Qormi	Free
11 January 2019	(United States) Gianluca Cuomo		Mosta	Free
11 January 2019	Luke Scorfna	Qrendi	Senglea Athletic	Undisclosed
11 January 2019	Gary Camilleri	Balzan	Senglea Athletic	Loan
11 January 2019	Nigel Bugeja	Lija Athletic	Siġġiewi	Loan
11 January 2019	Philip Schranz	Senglea Athletic	Birkirkara	Loan return
11 January 2019	(Hungary) Bence Perger		Senglea Athletic	Free
11 January 2019	Gianluca Sultana	Vittoriosa Stars	Żejtun Corinthians	Loan return
11 January 2019	Luke Gatt	Żebbuġ Rangers	Rabat Ajax	Undisclosed
11 January 2019	Steven Camilleri		Marsa	Free
11 January 2019	(Albania) Elvis Pajo		Marsa	Free
11 January 2019	Stacey Vella	Għargħur	Marsa	Free
11 January 2019	Ian Montanaro	Gudja United	Fgura United	Undisclosed
12 January 2019	(Italy) Maurizio Vella	Floriana	Birkirkara	Undisclosed
12 January 2019	Ryan Camenzuli	Birkirkara	Floriana	Player swap
12 January 2019	Terence Vella	Birkirkara	Floriana	Player swap
12 January 2019	Andriy Camilleri	Marsa	St. Venera Lightnings	Loan
12 January 2019	(Italy) Manuel Marra		Marsa	Free
14 January 2019	(Japan) Kei Hirose	Mosta		Released
14 January 2019	(Argentina) Alexis Ramos	Gudja United		Released
14 January 2019	Karl Pulo	Gżira United	St. Lucia	Loan
14 January 2019	(Brazil) Ricardinho	Tarxien Rainbows	Balzan	Loan
14 January 2019	(Italy) Gianmarco Conti	(Italy) Lavagnese	Gżira United	Undisclosed
14 January 2019	Siraj Arab	Balzan	Tarxien Rainbows	Loan
14 January 2019	Steve Pisani	Floriana	Balzan	Undisclosed
14 January 2019	Margeith Scicluna	Żejtun Corinthians	Vittoriosa Stars	Loan
15 January 2019	(Japan) Shunsuke Nakamura	Pietà Hotspurs		Released
15 January 2019	(Argentina) Brandon Paiber	St. Lucia	Floriana	Loan
15 January 2019	Daniel Buckle	Senglea Athletic	Hibernians	Loan return
15 January 2019	(Uruguay) Nico Pandiani	Ħamrun Spartans		Released
15 January 2019	Jurgen Grech	Mosta	San Ġwann	Loan
15 January 2019	(Angola) Barkley Miguel Panzo	(Lithuania) Panevėžys	Vittoriosa Stars	Undisclosed
15 January 2019	(Serbia) Stefan Radovanović	Tarxien Rainbows		Released
15 January 2019	Craig Abdilla		Mqabba	Free
16 January 2019	Andre Scicluna	Tarxien Rainbows	Ħamrun Spartans	Undisclosed
16 January 2019	(Serbia) Stefan Radovanović		Pietà Hotspurs	Free
16 January 2019	(Italy) Thomas Veronese	Gżira United	Tarxien Rainbows	Undisclosed
16 January 2019	Melvin Busuttil		Qrendi	Free
17 January 2019	(Nigeria) Uchenna Umeh		Pietà Hotspurs	Free
17 January 2019	(Italy) Antonio Monticelli	Ħamrun Spartans		Released
17 January 2019	(Brazil) Edson Farias		Naxxar Lions	Free
17 January 2019	(Italy) Antonio Monticelli		Valletta	Free
17 January 2019	(France) Prince Mambouana	Gżira United		Released
17 January 2019	George Chircop	Gudja United		Released
17 January 2019	Lee Joe Schembri	Lija Athletic	Gudja United	Undisclosed
17 January 2019	Ryan Marmara		Lija Athletic	Free
17 January 2019	Zach Valletta		Senglea Athletic	Free
17 January 2019	(Japan) Taisei Marukawa		Senglea Athletic	Free
18 January 2019	(Australia) Harry Ascroft	Balzan	(Republic of Ireland) Finn Harps	Undisclosed
