= British National Circuit Race Championships =

The British National Circuit Race Championships cover several different categories of British road bicycle racing events, normally held annually. The first championships were held in 1979 for professional cyclists only. Amateur championships were introduced in 1993 but only three of these were held as the amateur and professional championships were combined into an open event in 1996. Women's championships were not held until 1998.

== Men ==
=== Senior (1996–) ===
Year	Gold	Silver	Bronze
1996	John Tanner	Mark Walsham	Jon Clay
1997	Simon Cope	Joe Bayfield	Mark McKay
1998	Chris Walker	Chris Williams	Dan Smith
1999	Chris Walker	Rob Reynolds-Jones	Chris Lillywhite
2000	Rob Hayles	John Tanner	Anthony Malarczyk
2001	Chris Newton	Dean Downing	Bryan Steel
2002	Dean Downing	Mark Kelly	Neil Swithenbank
2003	Russell Downing	Dean Downing	Bryan Taylor
2004	Colin Roshier	Greg Sandy	Aaron McCaffrey
2005	Mark Cavendish	Russell Downing	Ian Wilkinson
2006	James Taylor	Tony Gibb	Adam Blythe
2007	James McCallum	Ed Clancy	Matt Cronshaw
2008	Dean Downing	Rob Hayles	Tony Gibb
2009	Russell Downing	Jeremy Hunt	Rob Hayles
2010	Ed Clancy	Ian Wilkinson	Jonathan McEvoy
2011	Graham Briggs	Ian Wilkinson	Tom Murray
2012	Scott Thwaites	Russell Downing	Matt Cronshaw
2013	Russell Downing	Graham Briggs	Ian Wilkinson
2014	Adam Blythe	Chris Opie	Graham Briggs
2015	Ian Bibby	Graham Briggs	George Atkins
2016	Chris Lawless	Russell Downing	Jon Mould
2017	Tom Pidcock	Harry Tanfield	Jon Mould
2018	Matthew Gibson	Tom Pidcock	Jon Mould
2019	Joey Walker	Isaac Mundy	Matthew Bostock
2021	Ethan Hayter	Harry Tanfield	Lewis Askey
2022	Matthew Bostock	Sam Watson	Joshua Tarling
2023	Oli Wood	Matthew Bostock	Tim Shoreman
2024	Lewis Askey	Matt Walls	Noah Hobbs
2025	Cameron Mason	Bjoern Koerdt	Matthew Bostock

=== Amateur (1993–1995) ===
Year	Gold	Silver	Bronze
1993	Roger Hammond	Jeremy Hunt	Mark McKay
1994	Dave Williams	John Charlesworth	Matt Stephens
1995	Sam Quinn	Roger Hammond	Jimmy Jones

=== Professional (1979–1995) ===
Year	Gold	Silver	Bronze
1979	Sid Barras	Ian Banbury	Jack Kershaw
1980	Bill Nickson	Sid Barras	Barry Hoban
1981	Championships not held in 1981		
1982	Phil Bayton	Phil Corley	Bill Nickson
1983	Keith Lambert	Dudley Hayton	Steve Jones
1984	Malcolm Elliott	Bill Nickson	Keith Lambert
1985	Dave Miller	Malcolm Elliott	Steve Fleetwood
1986	Paul Sherwen	Steve Joughin	Phil Thomas
1987	Tim Harris	Chris Lillywhite	Mark Walsham
1988	Mark Walsham	Jon Walshaw	Nick Barnes
1989	Paul Curran	Mark Walsham	Chris Lillywhite
1990	Rob Holden	Hilton McMurdo	Adrian Timmis
1991	Rob Holden	Hilton McMurdo	Mark Walsham
1992	Neil Hoban	Dave Baker	Keith Reynolds
1993	Chris Lillywhite	Spencer Wingrave	Simon Cope
1994	Neil Hoban	Dave Rayner	Bernie Burns
1995	Jon Clay	Mark Walsham	Chris Lillywhite

=== Junior ===
Year	Gold	Silver	Bronze
2005	Adam Blythe	?	?

=== Under 16 ===
Year	Gold	Silver	Bronze
1994	Iain Hibbert	Russell Downing	Steven Hurrell
1995	Ross Edgar	Thomas White	Philip Law
1996	Matt Brammeier	Adam Duggleby	Mark Cavendish
1998	Tom Smith	Jon Mozley	Ian Stannard
1999	Tom Smith	Andy Tennant	
2000	Mark McNally	Jonathan Bellis	Jonathan McEvoy
2001	Geraint Thomas	Andrew Gough	Peter Richardson
2005	Adam Blythe	Mark McNally	Benjamin Plain
2006	Tomas Skubala	Andrew Fenn	Benjamin Plain
2007	Alexander King	Kian Emadi	Matthew Bailey
2008	Lewis Balyckyi	Simon Yates	Mark Baxter
2009	Sam Lowe	James Berryman	Joshua Papworth
2010	Germain Burton	Alex Peters	Harry Tanfield
2011	Chris Lawless	Tao Geoghegan Hart	Jacob Scott
2012	Gabriel Cullaigh	Charlie Tanfield	Joe Evans
2013	Ben Forsyth	Oliver Peckover	Nathan Draper
2014	Matthias Barnet	William Gascoyne	Jamie Ridehalgh
2015	Fred Wright	Jake Stewart	Thomas Pidcock
2016	Sean Flynn	Joshua Sandman	William Draper
2017	Samuel Watson	Alfred George	Oliver Rees
2018	Oliver Stockwell	Will Corkill	Joe Pidcock
2019	Finlay Pickering	William Smith	Max Poole
2020

=== Under 14 ===
Year	Gold	Silver	Bronze
1999	Mark Cavendish	?	Samuel Relf
2000	Geraint Thomas	Ben Crawforth	Sammy Cotton
2001	Philip Gough	Lewis Atkins	Jonathon Mozley
2003	Tony Lock	Adam Blythe	Bonar Lizaitis
2004	Alex Aldham-Breary	William Penn	Joss Bentley
2006	Daniel McLay	Samuel Fry	Lewis Balyckyi
2007	Joshua Papworth	Jonathan Dibben	Jordan Hargreaves
2008	Jonathan Dibben	Harry Tanfield	Samuel Lowe
2009	Daniel Maslin	Germain Burton	Chris Lawless
2010	Louis Magnani	Ben Chapman	Jack King
2011	James Ireson	Joseph Fry	Joey Walker
2012	Daniel Tulett	Matt Walls	Sebastian Dickens
2013	Daniel Tulett	Hamish Turnbull	Anthony Anderson
2014	Jack Ford	Matthew Burke	Euan Cameron
2015	Lewis Askey	Samuel Watson	Dylan Westley
2016	Oliver Stockwell	Bob Donaldson	Nick Jackson
2017	Joe Kiely	Finlay Pickering	Josh Charlton
2018	Alex Barker	Ifan Roberts-Jones	Nathan Hardy
2019	Max Greensill	Raphael Tabiner	Tomos Pattinson
2020

== Women ==
=== 1998– ===
Year	Gold	Silver	Bronze
1998	Sara Symington	Angela Hunter	Sally Boyden
1999	Sally Boyden	Maxine Johnson	Susan Carter
2000	Frances Newstead	Melanie Sears	Melanie Szubrycht
2001	Charlotte Hopkinson	Sara Dean	Nina Davies
2002	Jacqui Marshall	Diane Moss	Sally Boyden
2003	Helen Gutteridge	Charlotte Goldsmith	Angela Hunter
2004	Claire Gross	Helen Gutteridge	Leda Cox
2005	Amy Hunt	Kim Blythe	Clare Gross
2006	Lizzie Armitstead	Tanja Slater	Helen Gutteridge
2007	Lizzie Armitstead	Joanna Rowsell	Katie Curtis
2008	Joanna Rowsell	Leda Cox	Katie Colclough
2009	Dani King	Laura Trott	Leanne Thompson
2010	Hannah Barnes	Corrine Hall	Joanna Rowsell
2011	Hannah Barnes	Dani King	Hannah Rich
2012	Lucy Garner	Eileen Roe	Amy Roberts
2013	Hannah Barnes	Eileen Roe	Amy Hill
2014	Eileen Roe	Amy Roberts	Charline Joiner
2015	Nicola Juniper	Eileen Roe	Amy Roberts
2016	Eileen Roe	Alice Barnes	Nicola Juniper
2017	Katie Archibald	Elinor Barker	Lucy Shaw
2018	Anna Henderson	Jo Tindley	Jessica Roberts
2019	Rebecca Durrell	Anna Henderson	Gabriella Shaw
2022	Josie Nelson	Emma Jeffers	Flora Perkins
2023	Megan Barker	Cat Ferguson	Maddie Leech
2024	Emma Jeffers	Eilidh Shaw	Isabel Darvill
2025	Kate Richardson	Isabel Sharp	Jessica Roberts

=== Under 16 ===
Year	Gold	Silver	Bronze
1999	Claire Dixon	Clara Beard	Laura Wasley
2000	Samantha Ashford	Kimberley Walsh	Laura Wasley
2001	Nikki Harris	Katherine Hill	Abby Jackson
2002	Kimberley Blythe	Abby Jackson	Jo Tindley
2003	Kimberley Blythe	Katie Curtis	Jo Tindley
2004	Katie Curtis	Jessica Stoddart	Emma Trott
2006	Hannah Mayho	Helen Clayton	Katie Colclough
2007	Laura Trott	Corrine Hall	Sarah Reynolds
2008	Hannah Barnes	Harriet Owen	Laura Trott
2009	Hannah Barnes	Lucy Garner	Hannah Manley
2010	Lucy Garner	Amy Roberts	Elinor Barker
2011	Keira McVitty	Alice Barnes	Bethany Hayward
2012	Melissa Lowther	Megan Barker	Kimberley English
2013	Grace Garner	Charlotte Broughton	Lizzie Holden
2014	Eleanor Dickinson	Jess Roberts	Charlotte Broughton
2015	Jenny Holl	Jess Roberts	Pfeiffer Georgi
2016	Pfeiffer Georgi	Elizabeth Catlow	Alana Prior
2017	Emma Finucane	Ella Barnwell	Eluned King
2018	Eluned King	Millie Couzens	Anna Flynn
2019	Zoe Backstedt	Millie Couzens	Eva Callinan
2020

=== Under 14 ===
Year	Gold	Silver	Bronze
2000	Kimberley Blythe	Marianna Burrell	Victoria Burrell
2003	Lucy Richards	Alex Greenfield	Jessica Stoddart
2004	Greta Junker	Sarah Reynolds	Amy Gallacher
2006	Laura Trott	Harriet Owen	Penny Rowson
2007	Harriet Owen	Hannah Barnes	Lucy Garner
2008	Lucy Garner	Emily Kay	Melissa Bury
2009	Emily Barnes	Emily Kay	Angela Eggleton
2010	Bethany Hayward	Emily Haycox	Kimberley English
2011	Charlotte Broughton	Megan Barker	Abby-Mae Parkinson
2012	Charlotte Broughton	Eleanor Dickinson	Jess Roberts
2013	Jess Roberts	Rhona Callander	Lowri Thomas
2014	Pfeiffer Georgi	Poppy Wildman	Lorna Bowler
2015	Ella Barnwell	Poppy Wildman	Josie Griffin
2016	Emma Finucane	Becky Surridge	Danielle Parker
2017	Eva Young	Izzy Brickell	Rosie Finucane
2018	Zoe Backstedt	Grace Lister	Imani Pereira-James
2019	Awen Roberts	Libby Bell	Ella Jamieson
2020
