= Dave Lloyd (cyclist) =

English cyclist

Personal information
- Full name: Dave Lloyd
- Nickname: Lloydy
- Born: 12 October 1949 (age 77) Oswestry, Shropshire, England

Cycling career
- Sport: Cycling
- Disciplines: Road & Track
- Role: Rider, Coach & Frame builder

Amateur teams
- 1970–1973: Kirkby CC
- 1979: Birkenhead North End CC
- 1981–1984: Manchester Wheelers' Club

Professional teams
- 1973–1975: TI–Raleigh
- 1976: TI–Raleigh – Campagnolo
- 1985: Raleigh – Weinmann
- 1987: Birmingham Executive Airways

Major wins
- (United Kingdom) British Champion

Dave Lloyd (born 12 October 1949) is an English former professional cyclist.

== Life ==
Lloyd began racing in 1969. In 1972 he came seventh in the Milk Race before going on to win the William Tell GP, beating Francesco Moser and Freddy Maertens, and riding in the Munich Olympics. In 1973 he turned professional with Raleigh, and over the next three years he won the national 5000m pursuit championship twice and set a national 50-mile road record. In 1976 a heart condition forced a three-year break from cycling. On recovery he restarted as an amateur and over six years won 125 of 133 races. In 1982 he won the Points, King of the Mountains and Overall in the Girvan 3-Day beating a strong field of riders that included Paul Curran, Joey McLoughlin and Jeff Williams. In 1984 he returned to the professional sport, and finally retired from cycling two years later.

Lloyd was a framebuilder for 13 years. Living in south Wirral, he is now a cycling coach and is behind the Dave Lloyd Mega Challenge. In September 2009 he planned to return to amateur road racing by entering the Derby Mercury road race. Unfortunately one of his athletes had also entered the race, and Lloyd decided not to compete against him.

== Palmarès ==
1972
1st Overall William Tell GP
3rd Stage 6 Milk Race, New Brighton
2nd in Stage 9 part b Milk Race, Scarborough
DNF Olympic Games, Road race
14th Olympic Games, Team Time Trial (100km)
1973
3rd Cryers Hill
1st Eckington
1st Felixstowe
2nd Haverhill
2nd Leek
3rd Nantwick
3rd Trofeo Baracchi
1974
2nd Bridlington
1st Caerphilly
3rd Durham
2nd Felixstowe
2nd Netherseal
1st Oxton
1st Southport
3rd Tom Simpson Memorial
1975
2nd Buggenhout
1978
3rd Currasong
1983
1st General Classification Girvan Three Day
1984
1st General Classification Tour of Ulster
1986
2nd General Classification Ron Kitching Classic
2nd Stage 1 Ron Kitching Classic
