= John Herety =

Road racing cyclist (born 1958)

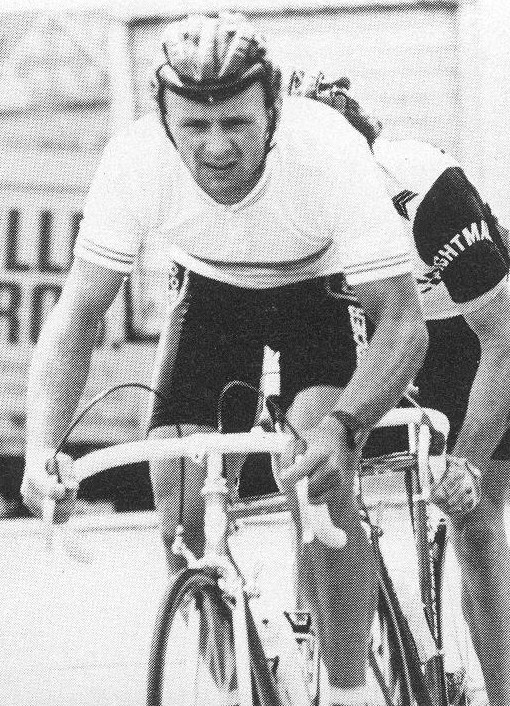
- Herety riding for Coop-Mercier in 1982

Personal information
- Full name: John P Herety
- Nickname: The Galloping Gourmet
- Born: 8 March 1958 (age 68) Cheadle, Cheshire, England
- Height: 1.73 m (5 ft 8 in)
- Weight: 61 kg (134 lb; 9.6 st)

Cycling career
- Sport: Cycling
- Current team: JLT–Condor
- Discipline: Road
- Role: Rider (retired); General manager
- Rider type: Sprinter

Amateur teams
- Cheshire Road Club
- Abbotsford Park RC
- Altrincham RC-Rotalac Plastics
- 1981: ACBB

Professional teams
- 1982–1984: Coop-Mercier
- 1985: Ever Ready
- 1986: Percy Bilton

Managerial teams
- Percy Bilton
- 1999–2005: Great Britain
- 2006–: Recycling.co.uk

Major wins
- British National Road Race Champion (1982); Peace Race, 1 Stage

John P Herety (born 8 March 1958) is a former English racing cyclist. He rode for Great Britain in the Olympic Games and won the national road championship as a professional. He is currently manager of the JLT–Condor cycling team, and occasionally provides studio-based analysis of cycle races for British Eurosport.

== Biography ==
Born in Cheadle, Cheshire (now in Greater Manchester), England, Herety joined Cheshire Road Club as a young teenager. His first win was in a Scouts' cyclo-cross race in Woodbank Park, Stockport. He was coached by Harold "H" Nelson and trained regularly with other local riders destined for professional careers, notably Graham Jones, Paul Sherwen and Ian Binder. Further success followed as a junior. He was known as a sprinter but he also won after breaking clear of the main field.

He came third in the 1980 British National Road Race Championships and won the Manx Trophy. Herety, a chef, received a set of chef's knives when he won a stage of the 1980 Peace Race in Karl-Marx-Stadt (now Chemnitz), a city proud of its steelworks. Herety finished 21st in the road race at the 1980 Summer Olympics in Moscow, the race was won by Sergei Sukhoruchenkov.

He then joined the French team, Athletic Club Boulogne-Billancourt in Paris, Europe's most successful sports club with fellow British riders Sean Yates and Jeff Williams. Herety won his second race for the ACBB which was a circuit of Toulon finishing in a bunch sprint. Herety spent one season with the ACBB and was offered a professional contract with Mercier riding alongside Joop Zoetemelk. In 1982 he had hoped to get a ride in the Tour de France. However, a poor performance in the Tour de l' Aude resulted in him not being selected by the Coop-Mercier manager Jean–Pierre Danguillame. Herety subsequently returned to England and won the Professional British National Road Race Championships. He also had success in the Grand Prix Pino Cerami finishing second after being outsprinted from a small group of riders by Ronny Van Holen. However, after three seasons with Mercier he had reached a level that he was unable to improve on. Herety explained: “My trouble is that I can’t recover quickly enough after a hard stage race or a race." "When I’ m racing abroad that is no good, with so many races to ride one after the other.” In 1985 he consequently decided to join the British-based professional team Ever Ready allowing him to race on the weekends and if needed have the whole week to recover. In 1986 he then joined Percy Bilton riding alongside Bob Downs and Steve Joughin. The following season he won a stage in the Milk Race and was runner up in the British National Road Race Championships. John owed his successes to his powerful sprint. However, his inability to climb and recover during hard stage races limited his palmares. Herety was not a general classification rider – evidence his 52nd overall in the 1984 Sealink International.

"I don't see myself going on like this, getting so little back for the effort I put in. In France, racing most days, I just can't get the results"

— John Herety

Herety became team manager of the Percy Bilton team after his racing career. He went on to become director of racing for British Cycling. He resigned following an inquiry into the 2005 UCI Road World Championships in Madrid, when Charly Wegelius and Tom Southam were alleged to have helped Italian riders rather than those in the British team. He was manager of Recycling.co.uk in 2006 and 2007, for 2008 this evolved into Rapha Condor–Recycling.co.uk and for 2009 became Rapha Condor.

== Personal life ==
Herety married Margaret (née Swinnerton) in winter 1983 and has a daughter named Georgia. Margaret is a sister to Mark, Paul, Catherine and Bernadette, all former international riders.

== Palmarès ==
1978
3rd Southport
1979
1st Eastway
1st Grand Prix of Essex
1980
21st Olympic Games, Road race
4th Tour of the Pennines (pro-am)
3rd British National Road Race Championships (Amateur)
1st Manx Trophy
2nd Premier Calendar
2nd London – Glasgow

1st Stage 4, London – Glasgow

50th Overall, Peace Race

1st Stage 9, Peace Race

1981
2nd Stage 5, Sealink International
1st GP de Peymenaide
1st GP de Sanary
1st GP de St Maxime
1st Paris–Rouen

1982
1st (United Kingdom) British National Road Race Championships (Professional)
3rd Stage 4, Tour Méditerranéen, Fréjus
1st Harrogate
1st Prologue, Tour d'Indre et Loire
2nd Grand Prix Pino Cerami
2nd Stage 2, Leeuwarden-Noord Scharwoude
2nd Stage 2, Ronde van Nederland, Noord Scharwoude
3rd Stage 4, Tour du Mediterranean, Cavalaire-Fréjus
16th Gent–Wevelgem
62nd Paris–Brussels

1983
2nd Glossop
2nd Stage 5, Paris – Nice, La Seyne
3rd Wingene
3rd Glasgow
3rd Manchester

1984
58th Gent–Wevelgem

1986
58th Nissan Classic

1987
2nd Professional British National Road Race Championships
2nd Eastway
1st Stage 10, Milk Race, Ipswich
2nd Wexford

1988
2nd Stage 9, Milk Race, Hull
3rd Windermere

== See also ==
- JLT–Condor (manager of)
