= Paul Curran (cyclist) =

English cyclist (born 1961)

Personal information
- Full name: Paul Curran
- Born: 15 January 1961 (age 65) Thornaby, North Riding of Yorkshire, England

Cycling career
- Sport: Cycling
- Disciplines: Road & Track
- Role: Rider

Amateur teams
- Stockton Wheelers
- Manchester Wheelers' Club

Professional team
- 1989: Percy Bilton

Major wins
- National Champion
Medal record
Representing England
Commonwealth Games
Men's road bicycle racing
Gold medal – first place	1986 Edinburgh	Road race
Gold medal – first place	1986 Edinburgh	Team time trial
Men's track cycling
Bronze medal – third place	1982 Brisbane	Team pursuit

Paul Curran (born 15 January 1961) is a former professional English racing cyclist from Thornaby, North Yorkshire.

Curran rode for Great Britain in the Olympic Games, won the national road championship and won several medals at the Commonwealth Games. With wins in top amateur races in France, he could probably have secured a professional contract with a continental cycling team but preferred to remain in Britain.

== Cycling career ==
Curran began riding for his local cycling club Stockton Wheelers and at the age of 14 completed a ten-mile time trial at Crathorne, North Yorkshire in 24–49. It was obvious he had talent when in 1977 he dominated the English schools national grass and track championship winning all three individual titles in the over-15-years category.

Curran earned his first international selection for Great Britain in the San Sebastian Europa Cup match. Although he rose to prominence in time trails and track events, he soon established himself as one of Britain's top road racers. In 1982 he rode for England in the Girvan pro/am three-day and was the highest placed British amateur on overall classification finishing 5th the race was won by Tony Doyle. However his season was still primarily based around track events.

Impressive results, winning several national track events led to selection for England, at the 1982 Commonwealth Games in Brisbane, Queensland, Australia. He competed on the track in the 10-mile scratch event and team pursuit. He won his first commonwealth medal taking the bronze medal in the team pursuit. Curran continued to perform well on the track and competed at the World Championships in 1983 in the team pursuit and 50 km point's race.

In 1984 he showed his versatility winning the Girvan three-day overall classification as well as the King of the Mountains and sprint competition. Later that season he competed in the 1984 Olympic Games in the team pursuit and points race. In 1985 Curran began focusing more on road racing, retaining his title in the Girvan three-day and was 4th overall in the Milk Race. He was also 3rd in the British Road Race Championship behind Jeff Williams and Paul Watson. After winning the Premier Calendar series and he competed in his first World road race championships in which he finished 29th.

In 1986 Curran was offered the chance to turn professional with Raleigh – Weinmann, however he decided to turn it down preferring to stay amateur. In 1986 he won two gold medals on the road at the Commonwealth Games in Edinburgh, Scotland, one in the team time trial and one in the road race. In 1987 he won the Amateur National Road Race Championship. That season he also won his third record breaking Premier Calendar series title in a row.

In 1988 Curran was selected for the Olympic Games road race finishing 36th, the race was won by Olaf Ludwig. After dominating the British amateur scene for several years in 1989 Curran finally turned professional. He joined Percy Bilton riding alongside Bob Downs and Steve Joughin. In his first season, he won the British National professional Criterium championships and was 6th in the Kellogg's Tour of Britain, finishing ahead of Sean Kelly. However, when in 1990 the British-based professional season collapsed, Curran was left without a team and he reverted to amateur status in 1991. He went down with double pneumonia and subsequently missed half of the season but bounced back in 1992 finishing 3rd in the British Road Race Championship.

He competed in motor-paced racing towards the end of his career including the last ever motor-paced World Championships in Sicily in 1994, His career ended when he broke his back in a serious accident during the Tour of the Pennines in 1996.

== Retirement ==
Paul became occupied with his son, Karl in 1997 giving him a new hobby. Curran owns Paul Curran Cycle Sport in Stockton. A time-served turner and ex-ICI apprentice on Teesside, he also builds wheels for Planet X.

Curran worked as a derny rider for the cycling events at the Birmingham 2022 Commonwealth Games at the London Velodrome.

== Palmarès ==
1977
3rd RTTC National Junior Best all-rounder

1978
2nd British National Track Championships 3000m Pursuit – Junior
3rd British National Track Championships kilo – Junior

1981
2nd Porthole Grand Prix
1st (United Kingdom) British National Track Championships Madison, 80km (with Stuart Morris)

1982
3rd Team pursuit, Commonwealth Games
20th 10 Mile Scratch race, Commonwealth Games
1st (United Kingdom) British National Track Championships Madison, 80km (with Hugh Cameron)
1st (United Kingdom) British National Track Championships 50km Points Race

1983
1st (United Kingdom) British National Track Championships Madison (with Hugh Cameron)
1st (United Kingdom) British National Track Championships Team Pursuit
2nd British National Track Championships 50km Points Race
2nd British National Track Championships 4000m Pursuit

1984
12th Olympic Games, Team Pursuit (4000m)
22nd Olympic Games, Points Race
1st (United Kingdom) British National Track Championships Madison (with Hugh Cameron)
1st (United Kingdom) British National Track Championships Team Pursuit
1st (United Kingdom) British National Track Championships 50km Points Race
1st (United Kingdom) British National Hill Climb Championships (Team)
3rd British National Track Championships 4000m Pursuit

1985
8th Lincoln Grand Prix
1st Premier Calendar
1st Tour of Normandy
1st Grafton to Inverell Classic
1st (United Kingdom) British National 100 km Team Time Trial Championship
1st (United Kingdom) British National Track Championships 50km Points Race
1st (United Kingdom) British National Track Championships Team Pursuit
3rd British National Road Race Championships – Amateur

1986
6th Milk Race
1st Premier Calendar
1st Commonwealth Games Team time trial (with Deno Davie, Alan Gornall, Keith Reynolds)
1st Commonwealth Games Road Race
1st Circuit des Mines
1st Lincoln Grand Prix
1st British National Hill Climb Championships (Team)

1987
1st Premier Calendar
1st Winner of the British National Road Race Championships (Amateur)
1st Lincoln Grand Prix
1st British National 100 km Team Time Trial Championships (with Deno Davie, Peter Longbottom, Rob Holden)
1st (United Kingdom) British National Track Championships Team Pursuit
1st British National Hill Climb Championships (Team)
2nd British National Track Championships 50km Points Race

1988
36th Olympic Games, Road race
1st Premier Calendar
1st (United Kingdom) British National Track Championships Team Pursuit
1st British National Hill Climb Championships (Team)
1st Lincoln Grand Prix
2nd British National Team Time Trial Championship
3rd British National Track Championships 50km Points Race
3rd British National Hill Climb Championships

1989
1st Porthole Grand Prix
1st (United Kingdom) British National Circuit Race Championships, Professional
2nd British National Track Championships, Professional 5,000m Pursuit

1991
1st Lincoln Grand Prix
1st British National Track 100 km Team Time Trial Championships (with Chris Boardman, Peter Longbottom, Scott O'Brien)

1992
3rd British National Road Race Championships – Amateur
2nd British National 100 km Team Time Trial Championships (with Wayne Randle, John Tanner, Julian Ramsbottom)

1993
1st National Motor-Pace Championship
3rd British National Track Championships Team Pursuit

1994
1st Archer Grand Prix
1st National Motor-Pace Championship
1st Beaumont Trophy
3rd British National Track Championships Madison (with Hugh Cameron)
3rd British National Track 100 km Team Time Trial Championships (with Rob Harris, Wayne Randle, Mark Lovatt)

1995
1st National Motor-Pace Championship
3rd British National Road Race Championships – Amateur

1996
1st National Motor-Pace Championship
1st British National 100 km Team Time Trial Championships (with Wayne Randle, Kevin Dawson)
3rd British National 50m Time Trial Championships (with Wayne Randle, Kevin Dawson)
