= Mark Bell (cyclist) =

English cyclist (1960–2009)

- Mark Bell wearing the Great Britain cycling jersey

Personal information
- Born: 21 June 1960 Birkenhead, England
- Died: 30 January 2009 (aged 48)

Cycling career
- Sport: Cycling
- Discipline: Road
- Role: Rider

Amateur teams
- Birkenhead Victoria CC
- Birkenhead North End CC
- UVCA Troyes
- Port Sunlight Wheelers Club
- ACBB
- Manchester Wheelers' Club
- New Brighton CC
- Prescot Eagle

Professional teams
- 1985: Falcon Cycles
- 1986: Raleigh – Weinmann
- 1987: Raleigh – Banana
- 1988: Emmelle-MBK

Major wins
- British National Road Race Champion (1986)

Mark Bell (21 June 1960 – 30 January 2009) was an English professional cyclist from Birkenhead. He rode for Britain in the Olympic Games, won the national road championship as an amateur and then a professional and was the first foreigner to win the Étoile de Sud stage race in Belgium. He died at 49 after collapsing at his home in Bebington, Wirral. He had recently recovered from alcoholism.

== Origins ==
Mark Bell was an early talent. A rival, Neil France, said: "I first met Mark in Barnston dip on the Wirral when I tried to drop him. As a 12-year-old imagine my surprise when the nine-year-old Mark kept up with me!". At 10 he finished a 10-mile time-trial in 33 minutes, wearing soccer clothes and school shoes. He came sixth in a race against boys several years older when he was 12, won cyclo-cross races and as a 14-year-old rode for the North of England in the English Schools Cycling Association international three-day at Filey, Yorkshire.

== Amateur career ==
Mark Bell won the season-long Peter Buckley Trophy competition for the best under-18 in 1978. He turned 18 the following season and won the Benedictine GP at Leyland, Lancashire. In 1979 he earned his first senior international selection, which was for the Sealink International and was 3rd in the British National Road Race Championships. Later that season still only 19 he finished the world amateur road race championship in Valkenburg, Holland. He also spent some time in 1979 with the ACBB, riding alongside Phil Anderson and Robert Millar. In 1981, he won the British National Road Race Championships in Colchester and won two stages in the Milk Race. The following season Bell and track rider Piers Hewitt spent some time living and racing in France for UVCA Troyes.

Bell represented England when he competed in the road race at the 1982 Commonwealth Games in Brisbane finishing 9th, the gold medal won by compatriot Malcolm Elliott.

Bell made history in 1983 becoming the first foreigner to win the Étoile de Sud stage race in Belgium. In 1984 he rode for Britain in the Olympic Games road race in Los Angeles. Bell was the top British rider for the Olympic road race. However the course contained a tough climb that no-one had told him about as the BCF selectors had said it was flat. Consequently, Bell felt he was the wrong type of rider for the course. Bell was not a climber – evidence his 110th place in the British National Hill Climb Championships, several years before the Olympics. He did not finish the race, and dropped out before the halfway mark. However he had an extremely successful amateur career, winning around 200 races as an amateur. That included classics such as the Pernod GP, the Lincoln GP and GP of Essex.

== Professional career ==
Bell returned from Los Angeles and turned professional for Falcon, alongside Shane Sutton. Falcon were one of several teams riding largely in Britain. He won the Delyn Grand Prix in his first season and finished third in the British National Road Race Championships. The following year he moved to the Raleigh team, riding with Paul Sherwen, Paul Watson, Jon Clay and former Manchester Wheelers teammate Jeff Williams. In his first season with Raleigh he won the British National Road Race Championships. Brian Cookson, later president of the Union Cycliste Internationale, said: "I remember, as a commissaire, following Mark throughout his successful breakaway to win the national pro road race title in 1986, when he simply rode away from some of the greatest names in the sport."

Bell was often labelled as a sprinter and won his first two stages in the Milk Race at York and Blackpool from bunch sprints. However Bell disputed this tag as he said "I sprint better from a small group than from a bunch. I’d say, basically, that on my day I’m a strong rider that has the ability to nick a sprint or go alone in a breakaway."

In 1988 he joined Emmelle-MBK riding alongside Graham Jones. He retired at the end of the 1988 season.

== Later life ==
Bell had repeated health trouble after he stopped racing, including alcoholism. He wrote on a web site in 2008: "After stopping racing, I was dogged with alcoholism which at present I am on top of, but I am partially temporarily disabled with DVT deep vein thrombosis damage to my lower right leg and foot and also have osteomyelitis damage to my left shoulder requiring a replacement shoulder operation." He was found dead in January the following year.

His brother, Tony, also a former professional, said: "Mark battled with a lot of his own problems in his last years, but, when he was on top of things and doing well, he was a lovely man."

"Mark was one of the best roadmen that this country has so far produced, with many solid performances, and flashes of brilliance that saw outstanding results in international events at home and abroad. "

— Brian Cookson OBE

== Palmarès ==
1978
1st National junior road race series
1979
(United Kingdom) 3rd British National Road Race Championships (Amateur)
1980
2nd Stage 5, Sealink International
1981
2nd Premier Calendar
2nd Stage 1, Milk Race, Bournemouth
1st Stage 7, Milk Race, York
1st Stage 12, Milk Race, Blackpool
1st British National Road Race Championships (Amateur)
2nd Newton
1982
3rd London – Bradford
9th Commonwealth Games, Road race
1st Lincoln International GP
1st Stage 11, Milk Race, Harrogate
1983
1st Overall Étoile de Sud

1st Stage, Étoile de Sud

1st Archer Grand Prix
1984
DNF Olympic Games, Road race
1985
1st Delyn Grand Prix
2nd Derby
(United Kingdom) 3rd British National Road Race Championships (Professional)
2nd Shrewsbury
1986
64th Overall Nissan Classic
1st British National Road Race Championships (Professional)
2nd Tom Simpson Memorial
1st Douglas Kermesse
1987
2nd Norwich
(United Kingdom) 20th British National Road Race Championships (Professional)
