= Tony Bell =

Tony, Antony or Anthony Bell may refer to:

- Tony Bell (journalist) (Antony Bell, born 1958), British journalist
- Tony Bell (physicist) (Anthony Raymond Bell, fl. from 1977), British physicist
- Anthony Bell (director) (also known as Tony Bell, born 1970), American animator, film director and screenwriter
- Anthony Bell (American football) (Anthony Dewitt Bell, born 1964), American football player
- Anthony Bell (businessman), Australian businessman
- Anthony Bell, American convicted mass shooter and murderer
