= Harold "H" Nelson =

English cycling coach

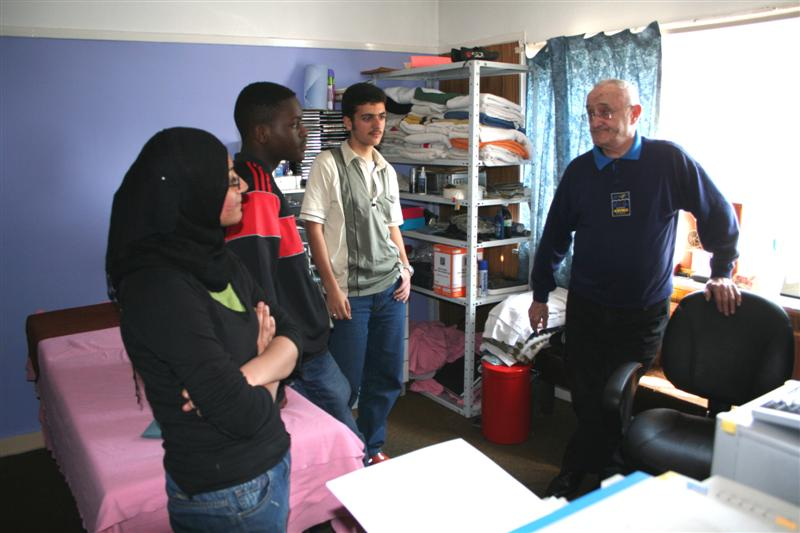
"H" imparts some knowledge to students from Loreto College, Manchester in 2006

Harold "H" Nelson BEM (30 January 1928 – 2 July 2016) was a cycling coach credited with helping amateur and professional cycle racing champions.

Nelson started to coach cyclists in 1953. From the early days, his methods are based on care of the body, power training and monitoring the heart rate - using them well in advance of their widespread use. He was the Great Britain team masseur on events including the Olympic Games, Commonwealth Games, seven world cycling championships, 21 Tours of Britain, three Peace Races (Warsaw-Berlin-Prague) and two Tours of Bohemia. He helped teams during 41 Manx Weeks and 34 Girvan Internationals. Riders he coached in the 1960s included time trialists Keith Stacey (British Best All-Rounder 1965) and Eric Matthews (24-hour champion 1968). In the 1980s he worked with Alan Geldard to help road riders turn to team pursuit.

In the 1970s and 1980s, he coached a number of international road riders, including Alan Kemp, Ian Binder, Brian Pownall, Mike Williams, and Phil Roberts; international riders who were also national champions included multi-national hillclimb champion, Jeff Williams, national road race champions John Herety and Paul Sherwen and national motor-paced champion Ian Donohue. More recently he helped Hamish Haynes (British National Road Race Champion 2006): he joined the training programme as a third-category rider and under Nelson's guidance he became an elite rider within two years before turning professional for a Belgian team.

A number of past riders have moved on to other roles within the sport: four have been GB team masseurs for major events including the World Championships and the Olympic Games. One rider, Dan Guillemette has moved from the parallel route of Nelson's tutelage and qualifying and working physiotherapist to working with the professional racing team, Team Sky. Rob Palmer, another former rider, has worked as a chiropractor with a number of professional teams including Garmin and Cannondale. Also, a former rider, Brian Cookson, having been the President of British Cycling (1997–2013), since September 2013 has been the President of the Union Cycliste Internationale.

Nelson's Wythenshawe home was, for decades, the nightly venue for riders, be they juvenile riders or experienced seniors, male or female, national champions or those seeking to optimise more modest performances. Whereas the indoor training used to be based on the use of overload training on rollers, with the advent of the digital age, he moved to a virtual reality system which was popular with riders and helped a more efficient monitoring of performance and riding style. He used a wide network of expertise, academic and medical, garnered largely from his former riders, to help his current crop of riders.

In 1987 Nelson was awarded the British Empire Medal for services to cycling.
