= Steve Joughin =

Manx road racing cyclist

Personal information
- Full name: Steve Joughin
- Nicknames: Pocket Rocket; Little Big Man
- Born: 23 June 1959 (age 67) Douglas, Isle of Man

Cycling career
- Sport: Cycling
- Discipline: Road
- Role: Rider
- Rider type: Sprinter

Amateur teams
- ?: Manx Road Club
- 1980: Manchester Wheelers

Professional teams
- 1983–1986: Moducel
- 1987: Percy Bilton - Holdsworth
- 1988: Ever Ready - Ammaco
- 1989: Percy Bilton
- 1990: Percy's AMP
- 1991: K.J.C. - Revelation

Major wins
- British National Road Race Champion (1984, 1988)

Steve Joughin (born 23 June 1959) is a former professional Manx road racing cyclist. He was the first Manxman ever win the British professional road race title. He is arguably one of the best UK riders of his generation, riding in the 1980s.

== Cycling career ==
His first cycling race as a youngster was around King Georges Park in Douglas racing in jeans and trainers. However he enjoyed the camaraderie of racing and soon joined the Manx Road Club. By the age of 16 he realised he had talent and won the Merseyside divisional road race championships in 1976 and 1977. He then became the first Manx rider to win the national junior road race series and the British Junior Road race championship. In 1978 he competed in the individual road race at the Commonwealth Games, finishing 27th after crashing on the final lap. The gold medal was won by Phil Anderson. The race featured in a National Film Board of Canada documentary about cycle racing called Cycling: Still The Greatest. The documentary includes footage of Joughin (then an amateur rider who was still working full-time in a garage) training in the Isle of Man.

In 1980 he won the Premier Calendar series, whilst riding for the all conquering Manchester Wheelers' Club. However he missed out on selection for the 1980 Moscow Olympic Games. At the end of the 1980 season Joughin decided he would spend the 1981 season living and racing in France However he did not settle and was back within a few months. As he was not prepared to live in a hovel scratching around trying to win races in the hope of being offered a professional contract. Instead he opted to live and race in the UK, now and again beating the big stars when they came over. The following season he again won the Premier Calendar series and competed at the 1982 Commonwealth Games in Brisbane. However the highlight was arguably winning a Stage in the Sealink International after outsprinting Dirk De Wolf, the eventual race winner. He was also third in the British National Road Race Championships, the race was won by Jeff Williams. Joughin then turned professional in 1983, aged 23, with the Moducel team which was based in Staffordshire. In only his second season as a professional he won the British National Road Race Championships in 1984. The race was held on the home soil for Joughin, in the Isle of Man and attracted huge crowds. Joughin was in chasing group which caught the main breakaway within sight of the finish. Joughin launched his sprint with 250 metres to go, went past Malcolm Elliott, and then past Bill Nickson just 50 metres from the line.

In 1986 Joughin won two stages of the Milk Race leaving behind Djamolidine Abdoujaparov. After four seasons with Moducel he joined Percy Bilton riding alongside Bob Downs and John Herety. That same season he had arguably his greatest ever victory winning stage three in the 1987 Kellogg's Tour of Britain from Manchester to Birmingham, beating some of the biggest names in the sport of cycling such as Sean Kelly. Joughin got into a breakaway and then went clear with Stuart Coles as the race approached Perry Barr on the outskirts of Birmingham. The pair stayed clear of the field all the way to the finish line in Victoria Square in Birmingham city centre, with Joughin winning the sprint comfortably.

In 1988 he had one season riding for Ever Ready alongside Tony Doyle and again won the British National Road Race Championships in Newport, Shropshire. However, after just one season he returned to Percy Bilton riding alongside Paul Curran. After notching up 200 wins as an amateur and 80 as pro Joughin retired from racing in 1991. His last season was riding for K.J.C. - Revelation.

== Post-cycling career ==
Joughin lives in Stoke-on-Trent, Staffordshire, where he has run his cycle clothing business, Pro Vision, along with his son, since 1996.

== Major results ==
1976
1st Merseyside Divisional Road Race Championships
1977
1st Road race, National Junior Road Championships
1st Merseyside Divisional Road Race Championships
1st National Junior Road Race Series
1980
1st Overall Premier Calendar
1st GP Essex
1981
1st Tour of the Peak
1st Stage 1 Milk Race
1982
1st Overall Premier Calendar
1st Archer Grand Prix
1st Stage 2a Sealink International
3rd Road race, National Amateur Road Championships
7th Road race, Commonwealth Games
1984
1st Road race, National Road Championships
1986
Milk Race

1st Stages 1 & 12

2nd National Criterium Championships
3rd Road race, National Road Championships
1987
1st Stage 3 Kellogg's Tour
1988
1st Road race, National Road Championships
1989
1st Stage 6 Kellogg's Tour
