= Panzo =

Panzo is a surname. Notable people with this surname include:

- Jonathan Panzo (born 2000), English professional footballer
- Barkley Miguel Panzo (born 1992), French-Angolan professional footballer
- Hermann Panzo (1958-1999), French sprinter
- Ilídio José Panzo (born 1993), Angolan footballer

== See also ==
- Panza (disambiguation)
