= Archer Grand Prix =

Cycling race

Archer GP
Race details
- Date: Late March/Early April
- Region: Chilterns, United Kingdom
- English name: Archer GP
- Discipline: Road race
- Competition: BC Premier Calendar
- Type: Single day race
- Organiser: Archer RC
- Race director: Stuart Benstead

History
- First edition: 1956
- Editions: 52
- First winner: Alfred Howling (GBR)
- Most wins: Steve Farrell (GBR) (x4)
- Most recent: Simon Gaywood (GBR)

The Archer Grand Prix was part of the British Cycling Premier Calendar.

== History ==
The Archer Grand Prix was run annually for over fifty years, organised by Stuart Benstead of the Archer Road Club (although Stuart Cook organised the last two events in 2006 and 2007). It was described by British Cycling as a "long running classic". The first edition was held in 1956 and won by British rider, Alfred Howling. 1968 saw the first non-British winner when Jan Krekels of the Netherlands won the race. The race has in the past, adopted the name of its main sponsor, including Harp, Pernod and Cycling Weekly.

Consistently routed around the roads and lanes of the Chiltern Hills, the most recent route was split into a large and small circuit. The large circuit took in Whiteleaf Hill and Hughenden Valley while the small finish circuit included the finish at Winchmoor Hill.

The 2007 edition was won by Simon Gaywood riding for the Plowman Craven Associates team from Matt Talbot (Rapha Condor) and Andy Roche (Pinarello). The 53rd version of the race was scheduled to run in Spring 2008 but had to be cancelled because of policing issues. The future of the race then became uncertain; it was scheduled to be held again on 19 April 2009, but sponsorship problems led to a second cancellation.

== Winners ==
- 1956 Alfred Howling Great Britain
- 1957 Tony Hall Great Britain
- 1958 Brian Wiltcher Great Britain
- 1959 Ron Coe Great Britain
- 1960 Billy Holmes Great Britain
- 1961 Gilbert Taylor Great Britain
- 1962 Albert Hitchen Great Britain
- 1963 Mike Shea Great Britain
- 1964 Derek Harrison Great Britain
- 1965 Les West Great Britain
- 1966 Hugh Porter Great Britain
- 1967 Dave Rollinson Great Britain
- 1968 Jan Krekels Netherlands
- 1969 Martyn Roach Great Britain
- 1970 Hugo De Haes Belgium
- 1971 Richard Jones Great Britain
- 1972 Jørgen Emil Hansen Denmark
- 1973 Jørgen Emil Hansen Denmark
- 1974 Vern Hanaray New Zealand
- 1975 Ryszard Szurkowski Poland
- 1976 Paul Sherwen Great Britain
- 1977 Paul Sherwen Great Britain
- 1978 Phil Griffiths Great Britain
- 1979 Jørgen Emil Hansen Denmark
- 1980 Jeff Williams Great Britain
- 1981 Alan Gornall Great Britain
- 1982 Steve Joughin Great Britain
- 1983 Mark Bell Great Britain
- 1984 Mark Walsham Great Britain
- 1985 Peter Sanders Great Britain
- 1986 Wayne Randle Great Britain
- 1987 Steve Farrell Great Britain
- 1988 Philip Cassidy Ireland
- 1989 Steve Farrell Great Britain
- 1990 Steve Farrell Great Britain
- 1991 Steve Farrell Great Britain
- 1992 Peter Longbottom Great Britain
- 1993 David Williams Great Britain
- 1994 Paul Curran Great Britain
- 1995 Chris Newton Great Britain
- 1996 Gary Baker Great Britain
- 1997 John Tanner Great Britain
- 1998 Jon Clay Great Britain
- 1999 Chris Walker Great Britain
- 2000 Roger Hammond Great Britain
- 2001 Gordon McCauley New Zealand
- 2002 Gordon McCauley New Zealand
- 2003 David O'Loughlin Ireland
- 2004 Julian Winn Wales
- 2005 John Tanner Great Britain
- 2006 Mariusz Wiesiak Poland
- 2007 Simon Gaywood Great Britain
- 2008 Not held
- 2009 Not held
