= Anthony Malarczyk =

Welsh racing cyclist (born 1975)

Personal information
- Full name: Anthony Francis Malarczyk
- Born: 21 July 1975 (age 51) Newport, Wales
- Height: 1.82 m (6 ft 0 in)
- Weight: 69 kg (152 lb)

Cycling career
- Sport: Cycling
- Discipline: Road
- Role: Rider

Amateur team
- 1992: Cwmcarn Paragon RC

Professional teams
- 2000: VC Lanester
- 2000: Realcostcarimports
- 2000: GB National Team / DuPont
- 2001: Atom Elite
- 2003: 4BikesOnline.com
- 2004: Ridley Cycles RT
- 2004: Dataphonics
- 2005: Fuji Bikes UK
- 2006: MOJO

Anthony Francis Malarczyk (born 21 July 1975) is a Welsh racing cyclist, from Newport, Wales, who competed in the Time Trial and Road Race at the 1998 Commonwealth Games in Kuala Lumpur and the 2002 Commonwealth Games in Manchester, England.

Malarczyk was assaulted whilst out training in 2000, after a driver, who had overtaken him, stopped the car and then pulled Malarczyk off his bike. He was awarded compensation in 2003.

== Palmarès ==
1998
3rd Welsh National Road Race Championships
2000
3rd British National Circuit Race Championships
2nd Prix De La Ville De Morteau – UCI 1.12.1

1st Stage 2, Lanester – Lanester

5th Girvan 3-day, Premier Calendar Event

2nd Stage 2, criterium, Girvan 3-day, Premier Calendar Event

3rd Stage 3, East Riding Classic, Premier Calendar Event
3rd Eddie Soens Memorial
3rd Manx Trophy
2001
3rd Overall, Premier Calendar Series

2nd Archer Grand Prix, Premier Calendar Event
3rd Romford-Harlow, Premier Calendar Event
3rd East Riding Classic, Premier Calendar Event

3rd Stage 6, FBD Milk Rás, Dungarvan
5th Isle of Man Trophy – Mountain Time Trial
5th Manx Trophy
2002
2nd Romford
3rd Tour of the Peak
4th Havant International GP – UCI 1.5
6th British National Time Trial Championships
2003
1st Stage 3, Ras Mumhan, Beaufort
3rd Isle of Man Bowl
8th British National Time Trial Championships
2004
7th FBD Milk Rás

2nd Stage 7, FBD Milk Rás, (Carrick-On-Suir – Tullow)

1st King of the Mountains, East Yorkshire Classic, Premier Calendar Event
2005
1st British Mountain Biking National Championships – Master
2006
1st Round 1, Dragon XC Series
