= Maurice Burton (cyclist) =

English racing cyclist

Personal information
- Full name: Maurice Joseph Burton
- Born: 25 October 1955 (age 71) London, England
- Height: 1.77 m (5 ft 10 in)
- Weight: 75 kg (165 lb; 11.8 st)

Cycling career
- Sport: Cycling
- Current team: De Ver Cycles
- Disciplines: Track & Road
- Role: Rider

Amateur teams
- –1974: VC Londres
- 1975: Archer RC
- ?: De Ver Cycles

Professional teams
- 1977: ?
- 1978: Fragel – Norta
- until 15 May 1979: Glemp – T.J. Cycles
- 15 May 1979–1980: Fangio
- 1980: Solahart – Hercka
- 1981: Campitello
- 1982: Xaveer Coffee – Tiga Sport
- 1982: Viner
- 1983: Roberts
- 1984: Nico Sport

Maurice Burton (born 25 October 1955) is an English cycle shop owner and former racing cyclist from Catford, London.

Born in London to an English mother and a Jamaican father, Maurice Burton was the first black British champion in cycling. His first taste of success came when he won the Junior Sprint national title in 1973. He won the amateur scratch title the following year, raced over a 20 km distance although he was booed as he crossed the line. He went on to represent Britain at the 1974 Commonwealth Games, but was not selected for the Olympic squad in 1976.

Burton became frustrated by the racism pervasive in Britain at the time, he moved to Belgium in 1977, basing himself in Ghent. He was described as the first black professional cyclist.

Burton rode 56 professional Six Day events, and retired from competitive cycling after a serious racing accident at the Buenos Aires Six Day in 1984. In 1987, he took over De Ver Cycles, a thriving bike shop in Streatham, South London.

His son Germain Burton was also a racing cyclist who has represented Great Britain on an international level as a junior.

== Palmarès ==
1973
1st Sprint, British National Track Championships – Junior

1974
1st Scratch race, British National Track Championships – Amateur

1975
1st Team Pursuit, British National Track Championships – Amateur
2nd Madison, British National Track Championships (with Steve Heffernan) – Amateur

1980
4th Madison, European Championships
