= Hugh Cameron (cyclist) =

Personal information
- Full name: Hugh Cameron
- Born: Great Britain

Cycling career
- Sport: Cycling
- Disciplines: Road & Track
- Role: Rider

Professional team
- Manchester Wheelers

Major wins
- (United Kingdom) British Champion

Hugh Cameron is a champion racing cyclist, having won the madison at the British National Track Championships in three consecutive years with Paul Curran. He first became interested in cycling as a schoolboy, it was at Grangefield Grammar School, Stockton-on-Tees in 1968 that he set up a cycling club along with Brian Cossavella.

Cameron has a master's degree in economics and was a senior lecturer at University of Manchester.

== Palmarès ==
1982
1st (United Kingdom) British National Track Championships Madison (with Paul Curran

1983
1st (United Kingdom) British National Track Championships Madison (with Paul Curran

1984
1st (United Kingdom) British National Track Championships Madison (with Paul Curran

1994
3rd British National Track Championships Madison (with Paul Curran)

2002
2nd World Masters Track Championships Points Race (45-49 age category) 20km
