= Simeon Hempsall =

English racing cyclist

Personal information
- Full name: Simeon Hempsall
- Born: 20 November 1969 (age 56) Sheffield, England

Cycling career
- Sport: Cycling
- Discipline: Road
- Role: Rider

Professional teams
- 1994: Choice Accountancy
- 1995–1996: Chevrolet – L.A. Sheriff

Major wins
- British Champion

Simeon Hempsall (20 November 1969) is a former racing cyclist who competed in the road race at the 1992 Olympic Games in Barcelona and finished 36th of 84. He also competed in the 1994 Commonwealth Games. Hempsall rode as a professional between 1994 and 1998.

He is now an osteopath in Sheffield and Chesterfield.

== Major results ==
1986
1st Road race, National Junior Road Championships
1990
1st Road race, National Amateur Road Championships
1st Stage 7b Tour du Hainaut
2nd Overall Premier Calendar
1991
1st Stage 3 Circuit Franco-Belge
2nd Overall Milk Race

1st Stage 2

3rd Road race, National Amateur Road Championships
3rd Manx Trophy
1993
1st Paris–Troyes
1994
1st Manx Trophy
1st Overall Tour of the Peak
2nd Overall Premier Calendar
2nd Overall Girvan 3-day

1st Stage 1
