= Pansa (disambiguation) =

PANSA is the Polish Air Navigation Services Agency.

Pansa was a 9th–10th century monarch in modern Thailand

Pansa may also refer to:

== People ==
=== Given name ===
- Pansa Hemviboon (born 1990), Thai footballer
- Pansa Meesatham (born 1974), Thai footballer
- Pansa Vosbein (born 1996), Thai actress

=== Surname ===
- Alessandro Pansa (1962–2017), Italian business executive
- Jean-Marc Pansa (born 1997), French basketball player
- María Isabel Pansa (born 1961), Argentine Army general

=== Cognomen ===
- Gaius Vibius Pansa Caetronianus (fl. 51–43 BC), Roman consul
- Marcus Hirrius Fronto Neratius Pansa (fl. 70–80), Roman senator

== Organisms ==
- Aphantophryne pansa, a frog of family Microhylidae
- Carex pansa, a sedge of family Cyperaceae
- Ismene pansa, a butterfly of family Hesperiidae
- Myosotis petiolata var. pansa, a forget-me-not of family Boraginaceae
- Pansa aurociliata, a moth of family Sesiidae
- Plicopurpura pansa, a sea snail of family Muricidae

== Other uses ==
- Pansá Blanca, a Spanish grape variety
- PanSa East F.C., association football club based in Pago Pago, American Samoa

== See also ==
- Panza (disambiguation)
