= Germain Burton =

English racing cyclist

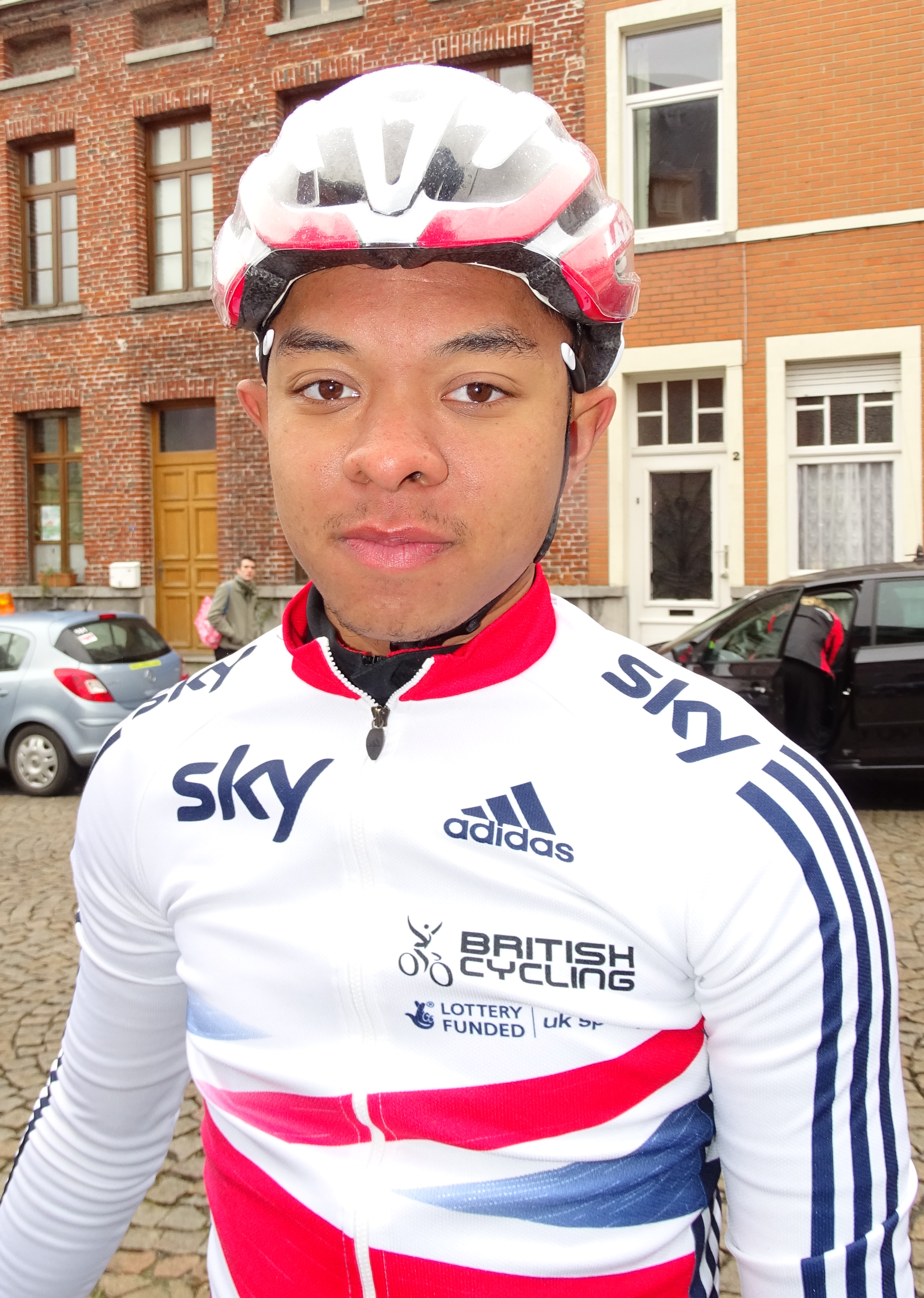

Personal information
- Full name: Germain Maurice William Burton
- Born: 29 January 1995 (age 31) London, England
- Height: 1.65 m (5 ft 5 in)
- Weight: 55 kg (121 lb)

Cycling career
- Sport: Cycling
- Disciplines: Track & Road
- Role: Rider
- Rider type: All-rounder

Amateur teams
- 2007–2013: De Ver Cycles
- 2014–2015: 100% ME

Professional team
- 2018: JLT–Condor

Germain Burton (born 29 January 1995) is a former English racing cyclist from London.

Germain Burton is the son of Mia and Maurice Burton, who was the first black British champion in cycling. He rode for a team sponsored by his father's bike shop, De Ver Cycles, based in Streatham, South London. He began cycling at the age of 12, joining in with the weekend club runs, and soon decided to take the sport seriously after some encouragement from his father.

He won the under 16 British National Circuit Race Championships in 2010. Burton represented Britain at the UCI Juniors Road World Championships in 2012, finishing 36th.

On 8 August 2013, at the Sir Chris Hoy Velodrome in Glasgow, Burton competed at the UCI Juniors Track World Championships. He was part of Britain's Team Pursuit squad which also included Ollie Wood, Jake Ragan and Tao Geoghegan Hart. They finished fourth, losing the bronze medal to Russia in the final.

In May 2016 British Cycling confirmed that Burton had decided to leave their Olympic Development Programme.

== Major results ==
2010
1st British National Circuit Race Championships – Under 16
1st Bec CC Hill-climb

2011
1st Bec CC Hill-climb

2012
1st Stage 2 Sint-Martinusprijs Kontich

2013
1st Stage 2b Junior Peace Race

2014
1st British National Team Pursuit Championships (with Christopher Latham, Christopher Lawless and Oliver Wood)

2015
1st British National Team Pursuit Championships (with Jake Kelly, Mark Stewart and Oliver Wood)
2nd Individual pursuit, British National Track Championships
3rd Team pursuit, Round 3, Cali, 2014–15 UCI Track Cycling World Cup (with Matt Gibson, Christopher Latham and Mark Stewart)
