= Panza (disambiguation) =

Panza is a town in Italy Panza or La Panza may also refer to:

People

- Carlo Panza, Italian sports shooter
- Federigo Panza (1633–1703), Italian painter.
- Giuseppe Panza (1923–2010), art collector
- Sancho Panza, a fictional character in the novel Don Quixote, Don Quixote's sidekick

Things

- Panza, another name for menudo (soup)

Places

- La Panza, California
- La Panza Range

== See also ==
- Catherine Samba-Panza (born 1956), interim President of the Central African Republic from 2014 to 2016
- Pansa (disambiguation)
- Panzo (disambiguation)
