= Premier Calendar =

- Sport: Road bicycle racing
- Founded: 1959
- Country: Great Britain
- Most recent champion: Evan Oliphant

The British Cycling Premier Calendar Road Race Series is a season-long competition run by British Cycling. It comprises a series of road bicycle races for the country's top domestic road riders.

== Organisation and events ==
In 2010 points were awarded for the first 20 places in each single day road race and for the top 20 overall in stage races as follows: 100, 85, 75, 66, 58, 51, 45, 39, 34, 29, 25, 21, 18, 15, 12, 10, 8, 6, 4, 2. For each stage of a stage race (including prologues) the top 15 riders are awarded points as follows: 30, 25, 21, 17, 14, 12, 10, 8, 7, 6, 5, 4, 3, 2, 1. Nowadays the series includes an award for the highest placed U23 rider in the final overall standings. Riders may have up to 10 counting races.

The 2013 series consists of six races:

- 27 – 28 April, Tour of the Reservoir
- 12 May, Lincoln Grand Prix
- 30 June, Beaumont Trophy
- 7 July, Stockton Festival of Cycling
- 14 July, GP of Wales
- 28 July, Ryedale GP

== History ==
The series was called The Star Trophy until 1975 when it became The Pernod Star Trophy to reflect new sponsorship. It reverted to the name Star Trophy in 1983. It was renamed The Premier Calendar in 1993. In 2014 it became known as the Elite Road Series.

== Results ==
Year	Winner	Second	Third
1959	John Perks	n/a	n/a
1960	Jim Hinds	n/a	n/a
1961	Kenny Hill	n/a	n/a
1962	Wes Mason	n/a	n/a
1963	Derek Harrison	n/a	n/a
1964	George Halls	n/a	n/a
1965	Les West	n/a	n/a
1966	Hugh Porter	n/a	n/a
1967	Peter Buckley	n/a	n/a
1968	Dave Rollinson	n/a	n/a
1969	Peter Matthews	n/a	n/a
1970	Peter Matthews	n/a	n/a
1971	John Clewarth	Phil Edwards	Phil Bayton
1972	Phil Bayton	Phil Edwards	Doug Dailey
1973	Phil Griffiths	Tony Gornall	John Clewarth
1974	Tony Gornall	Willi Moore	Phil Griffiths
1975	Phil Griffiths	Tony Gornall	Kevin Apter
1976	Paul Sherwen	Steve Lawrence	Bob Downs
1977	Steve Lawrence	Paul Sherwen	Dave Cuming
1978	Steve Lawrence	Robert Millar	Des Fretwell
1979	Bob Downs	Jeff Williams	Steve Lawrence
1980	Steve Joughin	John Herety	Phil Galloway
1981	Bob Downs	Mark Bell	Alan Gornall
1982	Steve Joughin	Jeff Williams	Mike Williams
1983	Malcolm Elliott	Peter Longbottom	Mark Bell
1984	Peter Longbottom	Joey McLoughlin	Neil Martin
1985	Paul Curran	John Tonks	Alan Gornall
1986	Paul Curran	Jon Clay	Alan Gornall
1987	Paul Curran	Darryl Webster	Peter Longbottom
1988	Paul Curran	Ben Luckwell	Neil Miller
1989	Ben Luckwell	Wayne Randle	Pete Longbottom
1990	Steve Farrell	Simeon Hempsall	Pete Longbottom
1991	Steve Farrell	Paul Curran	Mark Gornall
1992	Mark McKay	John Tanner	John Charlesworth
1993	Mark Walsham	Chris Lillywhite	Brian Smith
1994	John Tanner	Simeon Hempshall	Chris Lillywhite
1995	John Tanner	Mark Walsham	Chris Lillywhite
1996	Mark Walsham	John Tanner	Chris Lillywhite
1997	John Tanner	Rob Hayles	Jon Clay
1998	Chris Newton	Jon Clay	Matt Illingworth
1999	Gordon McCauley	Matt Stephens	John Tanner
2000	Mark Lovatt	John Tanner	Julian Winn
2001	John Tanner	Mark Lovatt	Anthony Malarczyk
2002	John Tanner	Mark Lovatt	Julian Winn
2003	Mark Lovatt	John Tanner	Malcolm Elliott
2004	Malcolm Elliott	Russell Downing	Dean Downing
2005	Robin Sharman	John Tanner	Russell Downing
2006	Kristian House	Robin Sharman	Matt Stephens
2007	Chris Newton	Gordon McCauley	Robin Sharman
2008	Russell Downing	Dean Downing	Evan Oliphant
2009	Russell Downing	Ian Wilkinson	Marcin Białobłocki
2010	Chris Newton	Simon Richardson	Jack Bauer
2011	Ian Bibby	Jonathan McEvoy	Marcin Białobłocki
2012	Scott Thwaites	Marcin Białobłocki	Russell Downing
2013	Evan Oliphant	Tom Stewart	Michael Northey
