= Brian Smith (cyclist) =

British cyclist

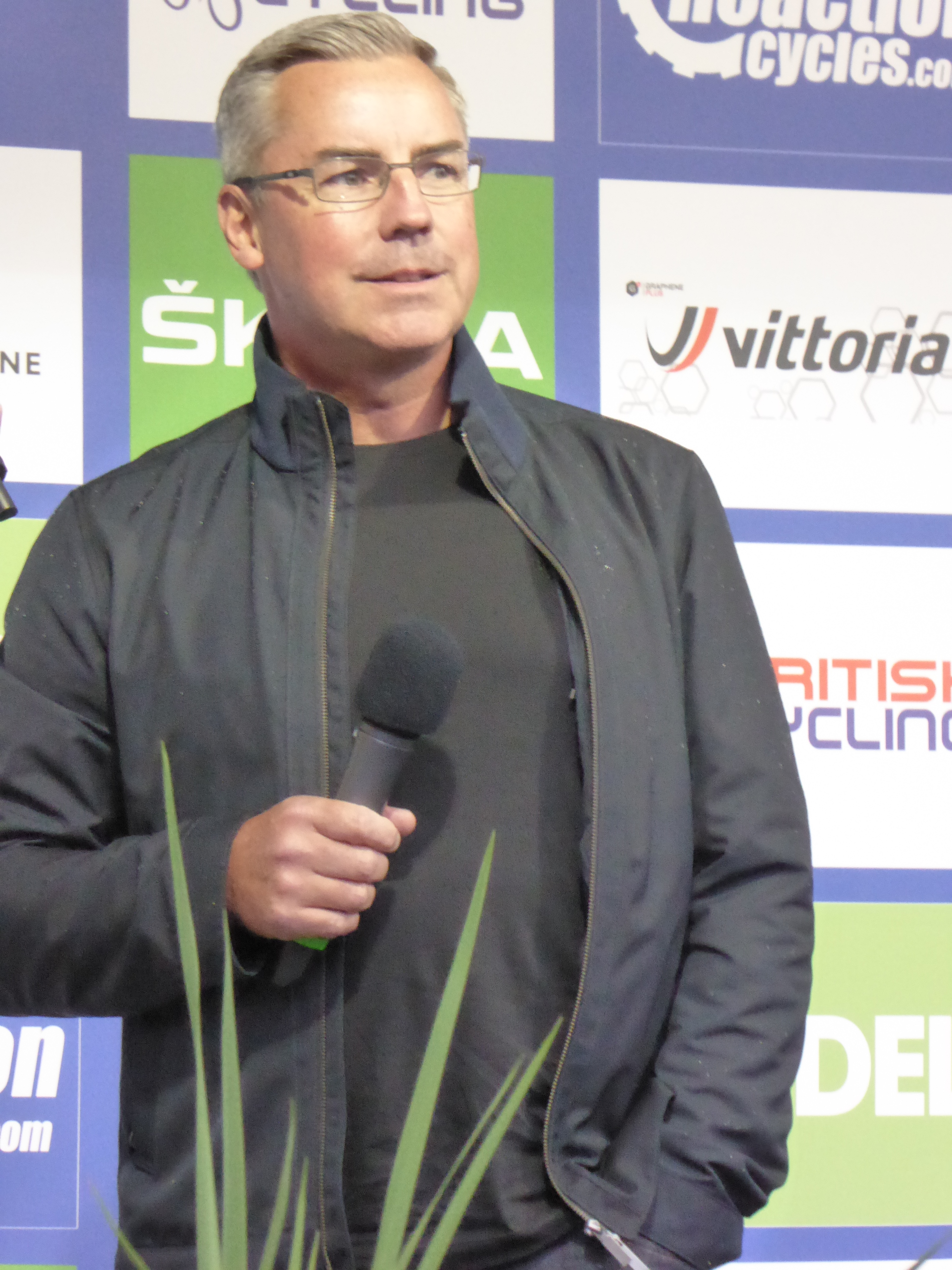
- Smith at the 2016 Tour of Britain

Personal information
- Full name: Brian Smith
- Nickname: Smithy
- Born: 7 July 1967 (age 59) Paisley, Scotland

Cycling career
- Sport: Cycling
- Current team: Retired
- Discipline: Road
- Role: Rider (1991–1999); Team Manager (2011–2016); Commentator
- Rider type: All-rounder

Professional teams
- 1991–1993: Banana–Falcon
- 1994: Motorola
- 1995–1996: Plymouth

Managerial teams
- 2011: Endura Racing
- 2012: Team NetApp
- 2014–2016: MTN–Qhubeka

Major wins
- One-day races and Classics National Road Race Championships (1991, 1994)

Brian Smith (born 7 July 1967) is a Scottish former racing cyclist turned commentator and manager.

Before turning professional Smith rode for the French amateur team Athletic Club de Boulogne-Billancourt. He won the professional men's race at the British National Road Race Championships in 1991 and 1994, and was runner-up in 1992 and 1993. He competed for Britain in the 1996 Olympic road race and represented Scotland at the Commonwealth Games in 1986, 1990 and 1998. He also won the Grand Prix Midtbank in 1994.

Since 2009, he has commentated on cycle racing for British Eurosport. He also joined the Endura Racing cycling team as general manager in 2011. Following Endura's merger with the German-based NetApp squad at the end of 2012 to form NetApp–Endura, Smith was initially appointed to the role of assistant general manager before becoming the team's Business Development Manager. In July 2014 team MTN–Qhubeka appointed Brian Smith as interim general manager until the end of the year as he had participated in the formation of the now-defunct Cervélo TestTeam. In addition Smith acts as manager to Czech rider Leopold König. In April 2016 it was announced that Smith would leave Team Dimension Data (as MTN-Qhubeka had become) at the end of the month by mutual consent, with Smith explaining that his role had become less hands-on and more focused on administration and logistics with the team's achievement of UCI WorldTeam status.

Smith is the founder of the Braveheart Cycling Fund, which was launched in 2003 to support young Scottish racing cyclists.

== Major results ==
1987
1st Stage 2 Girvan Easter Three Day
1988
3rd Manx International Road Race
3rd Paris–Troyes
1990
1st Lincoln Grand Prix
3rd Prix des Flandres Françaises
1991
1st Road race, National Road Championships
2nd Tredegar
1992
1st Brighton
1st Glasgow Criterium
2nd Road race, National Road Championships
3rd Overall Tour of Lancashire
7th Overall Tour of Britain
1993
1st Bishops Castle
1st Manx International Road Race
1st Manchester
1st Port Talbot
2nd Road race, National Road Championships
1994
1st Road race, National Road Championships
1st GP Herning
1995
1st Tour of the Fountain
1996
1st Overall Tour of the Kingdom

1st Stage 2

1st Stage 4 Tucson Bicycle Classic
1997
3rd Manx Premier Trophy
1998
1st Stage 2 Tour of Lancashire
3rd Overall Procam Two Day
