= Archer Road Club =

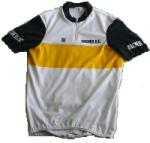
Archer RC Jersey

The Archer Road Club is a cycling club in London, England. The club has produced national, world and Olympic champions.

== Formation and early history ==
Archer Road Club was founded in 1926 as a breakaway from Bayswater Wheelers. The original members met above Teddy Barnes' cycle shop in Archer Road. The shop (E.J. Barnes) is still there, but Archer Road has now been incorporated into Westbourne Grove. The club has moved from North Kensington, via Hammersmith to Acton, but draws members from all London and further afield. The principal meeting place (especially in the summer) is Hillingdon Cycle Circuit in Hayes, West London.

In the 1970s the club was one of the first with sponsorship. Early sponsors included Cutty Sark whisky and Saba, a cycle component company.

The club has played host to riders from Australia and New Zealand, including Phil Anderson, who became the first non-European to wear the yellow jersey in the Tour de France, and Gary Wiggins, father of Bradley Wiggins, was also a member.

== The Archer Grand Prix ==
The club has organised the Archer Grand Prix, one of Britain's top one day races, for 50 years. The 2006 edition was won by Mariusz Wiesiak of Poland from Malcolm Elliott of Pinarello Racing Team.

== Olympic, World and Commonwealth Championships ==
Former member, Bradley Wiggins won the gold medal for the individual pursuit at the 2004 Summer Olympics in Athens. He won the world championship for the pursuit in 2003 and 2007. In 2007 he was a member of the winning team pursuit team. In 1998 Wiggins was world junior champion in the individual pursuit.

Steve Heffernan won a gold medal for the 10 miles scratch track race at the 1974 Commonwealth Games. Heffernan won a bronze in the 1977 world professional 5 km individual pursuit. In 1982 Steve Lawrence won the Commonwealth Games team time trial event.

== Sexual abuse accusations ==
Bradley Wiggins, who trained at Archer Road Club as a youth, has stated that Stan Knight, an Archer Road Club coach, sexually abused him in the 1990s.

== British championship performances ==
=== Track ===
The club won the team pursuit in 1973 (bronze), 1974, 1975 and 1976. Steve Heffernan won medals in 1972 (20 km, gold), 1973 (800m grass, gold; 80 km madison, silver), 1974 (individual pursuit, silver; 20 km scratch, bronze), 1975 (individual pursuit, gold; 80 km madison, bronze) and 1976 (individual pursuit, gold; madison, gold). Other prominent track riders include Malcolm Hill (1974 sprint champion), Robin Croker, Maurice Burton, Dave Le Grys, Dave Brotherton, Shaun Fenwick and Keith Pettican.

=== Road ===
Alaric Gayfer won the juvenile 10-mile time trial championship in 1972 and the junior 25-mile time trial championship in 1974. Alf Engers won the 25-mile championship in 1974. Dean Butler won the junior 25-mile championship in 1981.

In 1979 Canadian Ron Hayman won the Tour of Ireland for an Archer team named 'London Australia'. His teammate Phil Anderson was second and Shaun Fenwick King of the Mountains.

== Colours ==
The club's colours are white with a yellow chest band and black sleeves.
