= Manchester Wheelers' Club =

Manchester Wheelers' Club is a cycling club in Manchester, in north-west England.

== Formation and early history ==
The club was formed on 7 July 1883, as Manchester Athletic Bicycle Club, the name being changed to Manchester Wheelers' Club in 1890. The Manchester Wheelers are the most successful cycling club in Britain having produced countless international riders and several World Champions. Many consider the golden era of the club to be in the early 1980s when the level of success achieved was renowned throughout cycling.

== Club colours and emblem ==
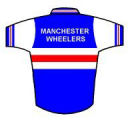
Club racing jerseys are royal blue, red and white, with the words 'Manchester Wheelers'.

== Notable riders ==
Reg Harris

Reg Harris was born in Bury on 1 March 1920. He joined Manchester Wheelers as a teenager in 1939. He won five world sprint championships, one as an amateur and four as a professional, and broke world records. He became critical of British sprint cycling and made a comeback 30 years after his first national amateur championship. He won the professional title at Leicester in 1974 at the age of 54.

Chris Boardman

Chris Boardman was born in Hoylake on 26 August 1968. He joined Manchester Wheelers as a teenager and dominated the domestic time trial scene with over thirty national titles including National 10, 25, 50, and British National Hill Climb Championships. He went on to break the Hour Record, win an Olympic Gold and have the yellow jersey in the Tour de France.

Other notable riders

- Alan Bannister
- Mark Bell
- Hugh Cameron
- Cyril Cartwright
- Sydney Cozens
- Paul Curran
- Emma Davies
- Bob Downs
- Malcolm Elliott
- Des Fretwell
- Alan Geldard
- Ernest Higgins
- Steve Joughin
- Dave Lloyd
- Alan Newton
- John Sibbit
- Terry Tinsley
- Darryl Webster
- Jeff Williams

== Tom Barlow ==
Tom Barlow — President of Manchester Wheelers' Club was commemorated in the Golden Book of Cycling in the 1950s. A copy of his citation is held at the National Cycle Library in Llandrindod Wells.

== Muratti Cup ==
The Muratti Race, "The race of the Champions", began in 1899 when the vice-president of Manchester Wheelers, D. B. Muratti, on behalf of Messrs. B. Muratti, Sons & Co., cigarette makers, presented a cup valued at 100 guineas. The Muratti Gold Cup is presented annually to the winner of the 10-miles event and has been presented several times at the UCI World Masters track championships. The trophy was won in 2006 by Sergio Gili of Argentina.

== Race Meets ==
The Manchester Wheelers' Race Meets were held until the Fallowfield track closed in 1975. They were world famous, attracting Olympic, World and National Champions from around the world including Tom Simpson, Cyril Peacock, Patrick Sercu, Sid Patterson, Arie van Vliet, Mario Ghella, Russell Mockridge and Jef Scherens.
