= Gordon McCauley =

New Zealand cyclist (born 1972)

Personal information
- Full name: Gordon McCauley
- Born: 9 March 1972 (age 54) Balclutha, New Zealand

Cycling career
- Sport: Cycling
- Discipline: Road
- Role: Rider
- Rider type: All-Rounder, Time Trialist

Professional teams
- 1999: Team Men's Health
- 2000: Palmans–Ideal (stagiaire)
- 2001: Landbouwkrediet - Colnago
- 2002: RDM - Flanders
- 2003: Giant Asia Racing Team
- 2003: Schroeder Iron Cycling Team
- 2004–2006: Team Monex
- 2006: Successfulliving.com p/b Parkpre
- 2007: Plowman Craven - Evans Cycles
- 2009–2010: Subway–Avanti Cycling Team
- 2013: Drapac Cycling

Major wins
- One-day races and Classics National Road Race Championships (1997, 2001, 2002, 2005, 2009) National Time Trial Championships (2002, 2003, 2010) Archer Grand Prix (2002, 2003)
Medal record
Representing New Zealand
Men's cycling
Commonwealth Games
Bronze medal – third place	2006 Melbourne	Individual Time Trial

Gordon McCauley (born 9 March 1972) is a New Zealand cyclist. He has won the men's New Zealand road race championships a record five times and the New Zealand time trial championships a record three times. He was also the first New Zealander to break the 50 minute barrier for the 40 km time trial, recording a time of 49 minutes 50 seconds at the 2006 Commonwealth Games in Melbourne, winning the bronze medal.

He is the only rider ever to hold New Zealand Road, Time Trial and Criterium Titles (although on different years).

In 2016 McCauley completed his 23rd Tour of Southland giving him the most completed tours beating 8 time winner Brian Fowler

== Major results ==
1996
1st Overall Tour of Southland
2nd National Road race championships
1997
National Championships

1st Road race
2nd Time trial

1st Sprint classification Herald Sun Tour
1999
1st Overall Girvan Three Day
1st Overall British Premier Calendar
9th Manx Trophy
2000
1st Grand Prix de la ville de Pérenchies
3rd Internatie Reningelst
7th Internationale Wielertrofee Jong Maar Moedig
2001
1st Archer International Grand Prix
1st Stages 3 & 4 Tour of Southland
1st Ottersham
1st Horton Cum Studley
2nd Brussel-Ingooigem
2nd Havant International GP
3rd Belsele – Puivelde
3rd Buggenhout
7th Grand Prix Midtbank
2002
National Championships

1st Road race
1st Time trial

1st Stage 8 Tour of Southland
1st Archer International Grand Prix
1st Grote Prijs Marcel Kint
1st Strombeek-Bever
1st Jock Wadley Memorial RR
1st Wanzele
1st Zwevegem
2nd Bochum
3rd Grand Prix Midtbank
3rd GP Fina – Fayt-le-Franc
3rd Zottegem – Dr Tistaertprijs
4th Henk Vos Memorial
2003
1st National Road Race Championships
1st Dwars door het Hageland
1st Stages 1 & 4 Tour of Southland
1st Stages 8 & 11 International Cycling Classic
1st Santa Barbara
1st California Bicycle Racing Series
1st New Plymouth
1st Te Awamutu Open Road Race
2nd Schwanendstadt
2nd Grote Paasprijs
2nd Lincoln International GP
3rd Flachgauer Radsporttage
2004
1st Stages 4 & 9 Tour of Southland
1st Rodney Rabbit Ride
1st Boulevard Road Race
1st Stage 1 Tour de Temecula
1st Nike Vision
1st Captech Classic Richmond
2nd Overall Valley of the Sun Stage Race
3rd GP Steiermark
3rd Walterboro
3rd Boulder-Roubaix
7th Overall New Zealand Cycle Classic
2005
National Championships

1st Road race
2nd Time trial
3rd Criterium

Oceania Road Championships

1st Road race
1st Time trial

1st Overall Tour of Southland
1st Overall Tour of Gippsland
1st Overall Tour of Taranaki

1st Stages 1, 2, 3 & 5

3rd Overall Tour of Tasmania
2006
1st UCI Oceania Tour
2nd Nevada City Classic
2nd Lake Taupo Cycle Challenge
2nd Culver
(bronze) Commonwealth Games Time Trial
3rd La Mirada
7th Overall Tour of Southland

1st Stage 4

2007
National Championships

1st Criterium
2nd Time trial
3rd Road race

Oceania Road Championships

1st Time trial

1st Blackpool
1st Tour of Pendle
1st Warwick
2nd Tour of the Reservoir
2nd Lincoln International GP
3rd Overall Tour de Vineyards

1st Stages 1 & 2

3rd Overall Girvan Three Day
3rd British National Road Race Championships
3rd Richmond GP
3rd Colne GP
8th Overall Tour of Wellington

1st Stages 1, 2 & 7

2008
1st Stage 1 Tour of Wellington
1st The REV Classic
Benchmark Homes Tour

1st Stages 2 & 4

2nd Overall Tour of Southland
3rd National Time trial championships
3rd Auckland 1000
2009
1st National Road Race Championships
1st The REV Classic
1st Stage 6 Tour of Southland
1st Round the Mountain Classic
1st Taupo to Napier Classic
4th Overall Tour of Hainan
2010
1st National Time Trial Championships
1st Overall Tour of Tasmania
3rd Overall Tour of the Murray River
2012
Benchmark Homes Series

1st Hokitika & Tour of Selwyn

1st Stage 5 Tour of Great South Coast
1st Stage 10 Tour of the Murray River
2013
1st Overall Tour of Taranaki

1st Stage 4

2014
1st Silver Jersey Tour of Southland
3rd Overall North Island Elite series

1st Round 1

2015
1st Te Kawhauwata Cycle Challenge
2nd National Club Nationals Open Men
2016
1st Round one Dynamo masters series
1st Stage one Tour of Northland
1st Te Kwhauwata Cycle Challenge
2017
1st World Masters Games 45-49 MTB
1st World Masters Games Team Tri
1st Waikato Road Race Champs 45-49
1st Nduro 4 Hour MTB (open)
2018
1st Round the Mountain Cycle Challenge
2019
3rd Ruapehu Express MTB
3rd Totara Park 6 Hour MTB 3rd (first Age group)
4th Crank it at Craters MTB
8th Contact Epic MTB (first age group)
21st Gravel Worlds Lincoln Nebraska
2020
1st Round the Mountain Cycle Challenge
2nd Te Kawahata Cycle Challenge
