= Chris Lillywhite =

English cyclist

Personal information
- Full name: Christopher John Lillywhite
- Born: 15 June 1966 (age 60) East Molesey, England, United Kingdom

Cycling career
- Sport: Cycling
- Discipline: Road
- Role: Rider

Professional teams
- 1987: Lycra-Halfords
- 1988-1989: Raleigh-Banana
- 1990-1991: Banana-Falcon
- 1992: Banana-Met Helmets
- 1993: Banana
- 1994: Foremost Contractors
- 1995: Karrimore-Mongoose
- 1996-1998: Individuele sponsor
- 1999: Linda McCartney Racing Team

Major wins
- 1993 Milk Race winner

Chris Lillywhite (born 15 June 1966) is an English competitive cyclist from East Molesey, Surrey.

== Cycling career ==
He won the Milk Race in 1993, and has competed on the continent. He was a professional rider between 1987 and 1999. Lillywhite represented England at the 1986, 1994 and 1998 Commonwealth Games.

During the 1986 Commonwealth Games road race Lillywhite finished third but was denied the bronze medal and relegtaed to fourth place following a successful protest by the Australian team regarding jostling with Grant Rice. He had placed his hand on Rice on the sprint to the finishing line.

== Palmarès ==
1983
3rd National junior road race series
1984
1st National junior road race series
1986
7th Milk Race
1987
2nd British National Circuit Race Championships
11th FBD Milk Ras
1988
3rd British National Road Race Championships
1989
3rd British National Circuit Race Championships
1990
3rd Grand Prix of Wales
8th Herald Sun Tour
- 1st Stage 3, Herald Sun Tour
- 1st Stage 12, Herald Sun Tour
1992
1st Stage 5, Milk Race
1993
1st Milk Race
1st British National Circuit Race Championships
4th British National Road Race Championships
2nd Overall, Premier Calendar series
1994
1st Tom Simpson Memorial RR
3rd Overall, Premier Calendar series
4th Commonwealth Games Road Race
1995
3rd British National Road Race Championships
3rd British National Circuit Race Championships
2nd Commonwealth Bank Classic
- 1st Stage 6, Commonwealth Bank Classic
3rd Overall, Premier Calendar series
- 1st Tour of Lancashire
  - 1st Stage 3, Tour of Lancashire
- 1st Thwaites Grand Prix
1996
1st Stage 5, Tour de la Suisse Orientale
3rd Overall, Premier Calendar series
1997
1st Tom Simpson Memorial RR
4th Commonwealth Bank Classic
- 1st Stage 2, Commonwealth Bank Classic
1998
1st Lincoln International GP
1999
1st King of the Mountains, Five Valleys Road Race
2nd Stage 4, VicHealth Herald Sun Tour
3rd Stage 2, East Riding of Yorkshire Classic
3rd Five Valleys Road Race
3rd British National Circuit Race Championships
4th Lancaster - Hertford Grand Prix
5th Stage 4, Tour of Slovenia
