= Gary Wiggins =

Australian professional cyclist

- Wiggins in 1981

Personal information
- Full name: Gary Wiggins
- Nickname: The Doc
- Born: 20 November 1952 Yallourn, Victoria, Australia
- Died: 25 January 2008 (aged 55) Newcastle, New South Wales, Australia

Cycling career
- Sport: Cycling
- Disciplines: Track and road
- Role: Rider
- Rider type: Six-day

Amateur team
- 1976: Archer Road Club

Professional teams
- 1976–1977: Falcon
- 1978: Harry Quinn-Galli
- 1979: Marc Zeepcentrale-Superia
- 1980: Marc-V.R.D.
- 1981: Fangio-Sapeco-Mavic
- 1982: Galli-Shimano
- 1983: Aernoudt-Rossin
- 1983: Kotter
- 1984: Fangio-Ecoturbo
- 1985–1987: Marc-Ecoturbo

Gary Wiggins (20 November 1952 – 25 January 2008) was an Australian professional cyclist, who specialised in six-day racing. His son is the British cyclist, five-time Olympic champion and 2012 Tour de France winner Bradley Wiggins, and his grandson is fellow professional cyclist Ben Wiggins.

== Early life ==
Wiggins was born in Yallourn, Victoria, Australia, in 1952, the younger child, and only son, of Roy Wiggins and his wife. The young Wiggins showed ability in cycling, and participated in cycling competitions around Victoria and Australia, becoming the National Junior Track champion.

== Cycling career ==
Wiggins represented Australia several times at world track championships. He was national champion in the 1 km time trial, and the 4000m team pursuit as part of the Victoria state team. He had a surge of speed at the end of races, which won sprint finishes. Wiggins married as a teenager and had a daughter Shannon, but left his family and Australia for the United Kingdom in 1974. He raced as an amateur for Archer Road Club in west London. Wiggins met his next wife Linda in England. The couple were living together from 1976; they married in January 1979, before moving to Ghent, Belgium, to pursue his racing career. Bradley was born there in 1980. The marriage broke down in 1982 and for 14 years Wiggins had no contact with his son, who returned to London with his mother.

He raced on the Continent for nine years; during this period he partied hard and had a reputation as a supplier of amphetamines to other riders. With Tony Doyle, he rode the Six Day circuit in Europe, in 1985 winning the Bremen Six Day. The same year he won the European Madison championship also with Doyle. He was also successful on the European Kermesse circuit including in 1981 beating Lucien Van Impe at Eeklo in Belgium. In Australia in 1985, Wiggins won the Melbourne Cup on Wheels and a 1000-kilometre road race in Western Australia.

== Post-cycling life ==
Wiggins retired from professional cycling and returned permanently to Australia after a crash in Copenhagen in January 1987. Wiggins worked as a housepainter in Muswellbrook, New South Wales, in later years. He remarried and had a second daughter, but this marriage also failed. He struggled with alcohol and drug issues. In his autobiography, Bradley Wiggins described a visit as a teenager with his father prior to the 2000 Summer Olympics in Sydney, recalling that "Most of his days would consist of buying a couple of crates of VBs ... and steadily drinking himself into a stupor."

== Death ==
On 25 January 2008, Wiggins was found unconscious in Segenhoe Street, Aberdeen. He was taken to nearby Muswellbrook Hospital before being airlifted to the John Hunter Hospital in Newcastle, where he died. The coroner's inquest found that the evening before, Wiggins had attended a party at a house in Aberdeen, but soon had fought with the man who lived at the house. He had been thrown to the ground several times and ejected from the party. After some time, he got to his feet and walked away unsteadily, before collapsing less than a mile away. The inquest determined that the cause of death had been a heavy blow to the back of the head. An open verdict on the cause of death was returned, due to lack of evidence: it was not possible to determine whether the head trauma had been received during the fight at the party, or if Wiggins had hit his head in falling. However, the coroner did find that two witnesses, including the party's host, had lied during the inquest. Another witness exercised his right not to give evidence. Wiggins' sister has continued to publicly question the verdict and has requested that the police investigation be reopened. In the wake of Bradley Wiggins' Tour de France win, she renewed her calls for witnesses to Gary Wiggins' last hours to come forward with more information.

== Victories ==
1976
10th Chequers Grand Prix

1977
8th Tour of Essex

1979
3rd Dentergem

1980
3rd Belsele
2nd Eeklo
3rd Zele (b)
2nd Sinaai
2nd Petegem-aan-de-Leie
4th Madison, European Track Championships

1981
3rd Beringen
1st Eeklo (b)
1st Melle
4th Circuit Escaut-Durme
6th Omloop van Brecht

1982
3rd Dentergem
3rd Westrozebeke

1983
3rd Essen
2nd Madison, European Track Championships
3rd Petegem-aan-de-Leie
1st Madison, Trexlertown (with Brian Tilley)

1984
2nd Bremen, Six Days
1st Madison, European Track Championships (with Tony Doyle)
2nd Six-Days of Grenoble
2nd Ulm
1st Nienburg
2nd Petegem-aan-de-Leie

1985
1st Bremen Six (with Tony Doyle)
2nd Madison, European Track Championships (with Tony Doyle)
3rd München, Six Days
1st Stage 2 Griffin 1000 West
1st Stage 4 Griffin 1000 West

1986
2nd Launceston, Six Days

== Bibliography ==
- Wiggins, Bradley (2012). In Pursuit of Glory. London, UK: Orion. ISBN 978-1-4091-2913-4.
