= Chris Williams (cyclist) =

Welsh cyclist

Personal information
- Full name: Chris raymond Williams
- Born: 14 February 1971 (age 55)

Cycling career
- Sport: Cycling
- Disciplines: Road & Track
- Role: Rider

Amateur team
- Cwmcarn Paragon

Chris Williams is a Welsh cyclist who represented Wales in the 1998 Commonwealth Games in Kuala Lumpur, riding the road race and the team pursuit, where he finished fourth.

== Palmarès ==
1998
2nd British National Circuit Race Championships
4th Team Pursuit, Commonwealth Games
