= Marko Batinica =

Serbian footballer

Personal information
- Full name: Marko Batinica
- Date of birth: 31 May 1997 (age 29)
- Place of birth: Smederevo, FR Yugoslavia
- Height: 1.85 m (6 ft 1 in)
- Position: Midfielder

Team information
- Current team: RSK Rabrovo

Youth career
- OFK Beograd

Senior career*
Years	Team	Apps	(Gls)
2015–2018	OFK Beograd		
2019	Senglea Athletic	0	(0)
2020–2021	RSK Rabrovo		
2022–2023	Sloga 33		
2023-	RSK Rabrovo		

International career
	Serbia U16	2	(0)
- * Club domestic league appearances and goals as of 24 April 2017

Marko Batinica (Serbian Cyrillic: Марко Батиница; born 31 May 1997) is a Serbian footballer who plays as a midfielder for RSK Rabrovo.

== Career ==
In January 2020, Batinica joined Maltese club Senglea Athletic. He left the club at the end of the season without appearing in any match for the club.

== Career statistics ==
=== Club ===
As of 24 April 2017

Club	Season	League			Cup		Continental		Other		Total	
Club	Season	Division	Apps	Goals	Apps	Goals	Apps	Goals	Apps	Goals	Apps	Goals
OFK Beograd	2015–16	SuperLiga	4	0	0	0	—		—		4	0
OFK Beograd	2016–17	First League	11	0	1	0	—		—		12	0
OFK Beograd	Total		15	0	1	0	—		—		16	0
