= Tony Bell (journalist) =

English cyclist and journalist

Personal information
- Full name: Antony Bell
- Born: 20 June 1958 (age 68) England; United Kingdom
- Died: July 2023 Bebington, Wirral, UK
- Height: 1.75 m (5 ft 9 in)

Cycling career
- Sport: Cycling
- Discipline: Road
- Role: Rider

Amateur teams
- -: Birkenhead Victoria CC
- -: Birkenhead North End CC
- -: Prescot Eagle
- -: Ribble Valley
- -: Port Sunlight Wheelers Club
- -: Kirkby CC
- -: Team Haverill
- -: New Brighton CC

Professional teams
- 1980: Midlet - Moser
- 1981: Ian May

Tony Bell (born 20 June 1958) was a freelance writer and journalist, known for his What's he on column in Cycling Weekly, where he was a columnist between 1994 and 2006. His popularity gained as a CW columnist led to engagements as an after-dinner speaker at cycling events.

Bell is also a serious reporter with a degree in politics who has reported on race riots, gangland contracts, drugs wars and environmental and social issues in his native Merseyside for The Independent and The Observer. Following a road accident in which several members of Rhyl cycling club were killed, Bell criticized the attitudes of those such as Jeremy Clarkson, whose column in The Sun he considered anti-cyclist, and what he saw as the cynical attitude of motorists. He called for a single organisation to represent cyclists in the UK to avoid such tragedies recurring.

Bell was also professional cyclist. He once held the mountains and points jerseys in the prestigious Mi-Août Bretonne. He is the brother of former National Amateur and Professional Road Race Champion Mark Bell, who died in 2009.

Ill-health including an ongoing heart condition exacerbated by alcohol addiction led to Bell's death in July 2023, shortly after his 65th birthday.
