= John Tanner (cyclist) =

English cyclist

Personal information
- Full name: John Tanner
- Born: 4 February 1968 (age 58) Doncaster, England

Cycling career
- Sport: Cycling
- Discipline: Road
- Role: Rider

Professional teams
- 1993: Neilson - Tivoli
- 1994: Choice Accountancy
- 1997: Controlware
- 1998: Brite
- 1999: Men's Health
- 2000: Linda McCartney Racing Team
- 2001: Ribble – Pro Vision
- 2002: Compensation Group
- 2005-2006: Planet X - Cycling Plus
- 2007: SPORTSCOVER

Major wins
- Commonwealth Bank Classic. (1995) National Criterium Champion (1996) British National Road Race Champion (1999, 2000)

John Tanner (born 4 February 1968) is a retired British Professional cyclist from Yorkshire.

== Cycling career ==
Tanner competed in the 1996 and 2000 Olympic Games.

He represented England in the road race, at the 1990 Commonwealth Games in Auckland, New Zealand, the 1998 Commonwealth Games and 2002 Commonwealth Games.

He has won the season-long British Cycling Premier Calendar a record of five times overall

== Palmarès ==
1992
2nd British National 100km Team Time Trial Championships (with Wayne Randle, Paul Curran, Julian Ramsbottom)

1993 Stage 2 Ras Tailteann(An post ras)winner

1994
Premier Calendar winner
1995
Premier Calendar winner

General classification winner commonwealth bank Classic

1996

British National Circuit Race Championships Winner.

General classification memorial Denis Manette, Guadalupe Winner

1997

1st Archer Grand Prix
1st Lincoln International Grand Prix
1st Tour of the Cotswolds
3rd Stage 7, Pru Tour
Premier Calendar winner

1998
1st Manx Trophy

1999
1st (United Kingdom) British National Road Race Championships
2nd Lincoln International Grand Prix

2000
1st (United Kingdom) British National Road Race Championships
2nd Lincoln International Grand Prix
3rd Havant GP

2001
1st Lincoln International Grand Prix
1st Tour of the Cotswolds
1st Havant GP
3rd British National Road Race Championships
Premier Calendar winner

2002
1st Havant GP
2nd Manx Trophy
3rd Archer Grand Prix
Premier Calendar winner

2003
3rd Archer Grand Prix

2004
2nd Archer Grand Prix

2005
1st Archer Grand Prix

2007
2nd National Team Time Trial (with Wayne Randle and Ashley Brown)

2009
3rd East Yorkshire Classic
