= Paul Sherwen =

English racing cyclist and journalist

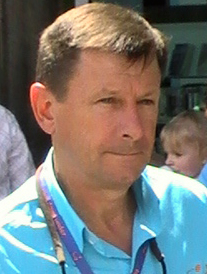
- Sherwen in 2009

Personal information
- Full name: William Paul Sherwen
- Nickname: Climber
- Born: 7 June 1956 Widnes, Lancashire, England
- Died: 2 December 2018 (aged 62) Kampala, Uganda

Cycling career
- Sport: Cycling
- Discipline: Road
- Role: Rider
- Rider type: Domestique

Amateur team
- 1977: ACBB

Professional teams
- 1978–1979: Fiat - La France
- 1980–1983: La Redoute - Motobecane
- 1984: La Redoute
- 1985: La Redoute - Cycles MBK
- 1986: Raleigh - Weinmann
- 1987: Raleigh - Banana

Major wins
- National Circuit Race Championship (1986); National Road Race Championship (1987)

Paul Sherwen (7 June 1956 – 2 December 2018) was an English professional racing cyclist and later a cycling broadcaster, notably covering the Tour de France. He raced in seven editions of the Tour, finishing five, and gained a reputation for his ability to suffer over long mountain stages. After his cycling career, he became a broadcaster, providing live commentary for English-speaking television stations especially of the Tour de France, which he covered for 33 years.

== Early life and early career ==
Born on 7 June 1956 in Widnes, Lancashire, England, Sherwen was brought up in Kenya, where his father ran a factory that produced fertiliser, paint and insecticides. He started his sporting life as a swimmer, finishing second in the under-14 Kenyan swimming championship. Upon returning to Britain, he won the regional under-18 championship for Runcorn and District. However, at 16, he turned to cycling and rode for the Weaver Valley CC in Cheshire, receiving guidance from Manchester coach Harold Nelson, and trained regularly with other local riders destined for professional careers, notably Graham Jones, John Herety and Ian Binder.

== Cycling career ==
At 19, riding for Altrincham Road Club, he won the season-long Star Trophy series in 1976, winning the Manx International and the Archer Pernod GP and two stages in the Tour of Malago.

A year later, he won Folkestone-London, attacking from the gun. For the French team ACBB (Athletic Club Boulogne Billancourt) he won Paris-Barentin, Paris-Mauberge and the Tour de l'Essone, and was third in the amateur Paris–Roubaix and second in the British championship. He won the Archer Grand Prix cycle race in 1976 and 1977. Despite spending only part of the year in France due to examinations, he came second in the season-long Palme d'Or competition. 1977 saw him ride the world championship in Venezuela, the pro-am Étoile des Espoirs and the Scottish Milk Race. Upon leaving ACBB he was invited to nominate a rider as his successor at the club, becoming the first of a chain of English-speaking riders who graduated to the highest level of the sport via the club, including Irishman Stephen Roche, fellow Britons Robert Millar (now known as Philippa York) and Sean Yates, and Australian Phil Anderson. He then turned professional in 1978 for Fiat under Raphaël Géminiani, and later rode as a domestique in the La Redoute cycling team.

He finished 70th in the 1978 Tour de France. In 1980, he came close to being eliminated on the third stage of the Tour. He finished outside the cut-off time (a percentage of the winner’s time), but was reinstated in view of his solo chase after a crash. The reinstatement delayed abandonment, and he was to repeat the process six days later.

Sherwen was 19th and 11th in Milan–San Remo in 1979 and 1980 respectively, and 15th in the 1984 Paris–Roubaix. He finished third in the Tour du Haut Var, won by Sean Kelly, in 1982, following a stage win in the season-opening Tour of the Mediterranean. He came second in the Four Days of Dunkirk in 1983, winning a stage. He won the Grand Prix de Denain that same year.

In the Tour de France, Sherwen finished 111th in 1982 and 116th in 1984. During the last mountain stage of 1984, he diced with the cut-off time. He and Australian cyclist Allan Peiper were riding towards the summit at La Plagne when Peiper was knocked from his bike by a Dutch enthusiast. Sherwen – aware of the cut-off – told Peiper to get back on his bike and they crossed the line just inside the limit.

=== 1985 tour ===
On the first day in the mountains of the 1985 Tour de France, Sherwen crashed in the first kilometre before the race had left Épinal. With Bernard Hinault setting a fast pace, Sherwen had little chance to regain the other riders. He rode solo for six hours over six mountains, accompanied by a motorcycle outrider, and was over an hour behind the stage winner, and 23 minutes outside the cut-off – the Tour publicity caravan had started its return journey and had to move to one side to allow Sherwen to complete the stage. However, again, his courage and endurance were rewarded by reinstatement – he was able to continue and went on to finish this Tour which would be his last.

Sherwen joined Raleigh in 1986 alongside Mark Bell, Paul Watson, Jon Clay and Jeff Williams. He retired after two seasons winning the British road race championship in 1987 his final season. He then managed the Banana-Raleigh team until Raleigh pulled out at the end of 1989. During this time, he worked as a co-commentator with Phil Liggett for Channel 4's coverage of the Tour de France, with the pair making their debut together on the Tour in 1986. After Banana-Raleigh, Sherwen worked as the Public Relations Director for the American Motorola Cycling Team. He was also considered for the position of Performance Director at British Cycling in 1997, but lost out to Peter Keen.

== Broadcasting career ==
Up until the conclusion of the 2018 Tour de France, Sherwen provided the commentary broadcast internationally for many television networks including Australia's SBS Network, Canada's Outdoor Life Network, and the United States' CBS, ABS, and NBC Sports with Phil Liggett. An obituary in the New York Times referred to him as a "voice of the Tour de France" and detailed some of his on-air antics and his collaboration with Phil Liggett, with whom, he estimated, he spent 150 days per year on the road. He covered the Tour de France for thirty-three years.

== Personal life and death ==
Sherwen lived in Kampala, Uganda and had interests in a gold mine in Busitema. He travelled regularly between Uganda and the United States.

Sherwen died of heart failure on 2 December 2018 at his home in Kampala at the age of 62. He is survived by his wife and their two children.

Sherwen was active in a number of humanitarian projects in Uganda, including a "a group that distributed bicycles and trained bicycle mechanics in Uganda", and a foundation was started in his name.

== Career achievements ==
=== Major results ===
1976
1st Archer Grand Prix
1st Premier Calendar
1977
1st Archer Grand Prix
2nd Road race, National Amateur Road Championships
2nd Premier Calendar
3rd GP de France
3rd Paris–Roubaix Espoirs
1980
3rd Stage 2 Critérium du Dauphiné Libéré
1981
1st Tour du Hainaut Occidentale
1982
1st Stage 1 Tour Méditerranéen
3rd Tour du Haut Var
1983
1st Grand Prix de Denain
2nd Overall Four Days of Dunkirk

1st Stage 3

1984
3rd Grand Prix de Wallonie
1986
1st National Criterium Championships
1987
1st Road race, National Road Championships

=== Grand Tour general classification results timeline ===
Grand Tour	1978	1979	1980	1981	1982	1983	1984	1985
Giro d'Italia	—	—	—	—	—	—	—	—
Tour de France	70	81	DNF	DNF	111	—	116	141
Vuelta a España	—	—	—	—	—	—	—	—

Legend
—	Did not compete
DNF	Did not finish
