= Julian Winn =

Welsh cyclist (born 1972)

Personal information
- Full name: Julian Winn
- Born: 23 September 1972 (age 54) Abergavenny, Monmouthshire, Wales

Cycling career
- Sport: Cycling
- Current team: Endura Racing
- Disciplines: Road, Track, Cyclo cross
- Role: Rider and Coach

Professional teams
- 1999: Linda McCartney Racing Team
- 2000–2002: Elite 2/3
- 2003: Team fakta-Pata
- 2005: Assos Racing Team
- 2005–2006: Pinarello Racing Team

Major wins
- British National Road Race Champion 2002

Julian Winn (Winny) from Abergavenny, Wales (born 23 September 1972) is a former Welsh competitive cyclist who was formerly directeur sportif at the UCI Continental cycling team Endura Racing. He represented Wales in the 1998 Commonwealth Games at Kuala Lumpur and at the 2002 Commonwealth Games in Manchester. He was appointed Welsh Cycling coach in 2005. In 2008, he was GB road race team manager at the Beijing Olympics, overseeing the victory of Welsh compatriot Nicole Cooke. Since the folding of Team Endura Winn has been Director Sportif at Saint Piran cycling team and a Director of Sugar Loaf Road, which organises bike riding weekends in the Black Mountains.

== Results ==
=== Cyclo Cross ===
2005
1st, Welsh Cyclo Cross Championships

2006
1st, Welsh Cyclo Cross Championships
2007
1st, Welsh Cyclo Cross Championships

=== Road ===
1998 PDM Sports WCU Team
1st, King of the Mountains Tour of Lancs
1st, King of the Mountains Tour of Morocco
1st, Stage 4 Prutour Chester – Nottingham 153.69 km
1st, Welsh National Road Championships
4th, King of the Mountains, Prutour

1999
3rd, Archer Grand Prix
2000
1st King of the Mountains, Commonwealth Bank Classic, Australia
3rd, Premier Calendar Series Overall GC
2002
1st, United Kingdom National Road Race Championships
1st, King of the Mountains, 2005 Tour of Britain
3rd, Premier Calendar Series Overall GC

=== Track ===
1999
1st, 4000m Team Pursuit National Track Championships
