= Neil Hoban =

British cyclist

Personal information
- Born: 4 February 1966 (age 60) Pembury, Kent, England

Cycling career
- Sport: Cycling

Neil Hoban (born 4 February 1966) is a British former cyclist. He competed in the road race at the 1988 Summer Olympics.
