= Stefan Radovanović =

Serbian footballer

Personal information
- Full name: Stefan Radovanović
- Date of birth: 19 February 1992 (age 34)
- Height: 1.82 m (6 ft 0 in)
- Position: Left-back

Youth career
- Red Star Belgrade

Senior career*
Years	Team	Apps	(Gls)
2010	Zemun	8	(0)
2011	Mladost Lučani	2	(0)
2011	Mogren	2	(0)
2012	Mornar Bar	12	(1)
2013	Borac Čačak	5	(0)
2013	Mornar Bar	8	(0)
2014–2015	Sloga Požega		
2015	Dinamo Vranje	15	(1)
2016	Radnik Surdulica	6	(1)
2016–2017	Zemun	9	(0)
2017	Petrovac	10	(0)
2017	Novi Pazar	7	(0)
2018–2019	Tarxien Rainbows	24	(0)
2019	Pietà Hotspurs	7	(0)
2019–2021	Qrendi	9	(1)
2021–2023	Zabbar St. Patrick	4	(0)
Total		128	(4)
- * Club domestic league appearances and goals as of 0:00, 1 January 2024 (UTC)

Stefan Radovanović (Serbian Cyrillic: Стефан Радовановић; born 19 February 1992) is a Serbian footballer who plays as a left-back.

== Club career ==
Radovanović passed the youth school of Red Star Belgrade. Later he played for Zemun, Mladost Lučani, Mogren and Mornar Bar for two times, but he was with Borac Čačak in the meantime. In summer 2015, Radovanović moved in Dinamo Vranje from Sloga Požega. Beginning of 2016, he joined the Serbian SuperLiga club Radnik Surdulica.

He later moved to Malta and made his debut for Tarxien Rainbows against Gżira United in January 2018.
