= Mark Lovatt =

British road racing cyclist (born 1971)

Personal information
- Born: 12 August 1971 (age 55)

Cycling career
- Sport: Cycling
- Discipline: Road racing
- Role: Rider

Mark Lovatt (born 12 August 1971) is a British road racing cyclist who represented the United Kingdom at the 2001 UCI Road World Championships and England at the 2002 Commonwealth Games.

Based in England, Lovatt has won the Tour of the Peak Premier Calendar race six times, the Premier Calendar series in 2000 and 2003, and the National Hill Climb Championships in 2002 while riding for the Compensation Group R.T.

== Major results ==
1994
3rd in National Championship, Road, Amateurs, Great-Britain (GBR)

2000
1st in Havant International GP (GBR)
1st in Stage 1 Girvan Three Day (GBR)

2001
1st in Stokesley (GBR)
1st in Naseby (GBR)
1st in Ingleby (GBR)
1st in Sheriff Hutton (GBR)
1st in Oakley (GBR)
1st in Tour of the Peak (GBR)
1st in Tour of the Reservoir (GBR)

2002
1st in Shay Elliot Memorial (IRL)
1st in Stage 3 Tour of Northumberland (GBR)
1st in Stage 1 Ras Mumhan, Ras Mumhan (IRL)
1st in Tour of the Reservoir (GBR)
1st in St.-Helens (GBR)
1st in Neil Gardner Memorial (GBR)
1st in Tour of the Peak (GBR)
1st in John Walker Memorial (GBR)

2003
1st in Manx International (GBR)
1st in Tour of the Peak (GBR)
1st in Stage 3 Girvan Three Day, Electric Brae (GBR)
1st in Lincoln International GP (GBR)
1st in Five Valleys Premier Calendar Road Race (GBR)
1st in Port Talbot-Five Valleys (GBR)
1st in Stage 2 Tour of Northumberland, Ashingtow (GBR)

2006
1st in A.A. Brown Duncan Murray Wines Road Race (GBR)
