= Barkley Miguel Panzo =

French-Angolan footballer (born 1992)

Personal information
- Date of birth: 9 September 1992 (age 34)
- Place of birth: Paris, France
- Height: 1.87 m (6 ft 2 in)
- Position: Forward

Youth career
- 2005–2008: Boulogne-Billancourt
- 2008–2009: Baník Most
- 2009–2010: Oyudos

Senior career*
Years	Team	Apps	(Gls)
2010	Hendon	3	(0)
2010–2011	Hillingdon Borough	4	(1)
2011	Northwood	2	(0)
2011–2012	Edgar	0	(0)
2011–2012	Walton & Hersham	2	(0)
2012	Woking	0	(0)
2012–2013	FC Sarlat Marcillac	[?]	([?])
2013–2014	Moulins	3	(0)
2013–2014	→ AS Moulins II	10	(1)
2014–2015	Saint-Brevin	22	(16)
2015–2016	Les Sables	14	(4)
2016–2017	Orléans B	20	(3)
2017–2018	Syrianska FC	0	(0)
2017	→ Oskarshamns AIK	4	(0)
2018	Panevėžys	1	(0)
2019–2021	Vittoriosa Stars	64	(76)
- * Club domestic league appearances and goals

Barkley Miguel Panzo (born 9 September 1992) is a French footballer who plays as a forward.

== Early life ==
Panzo was born in 1992 in the 12th arrondissement of Paris to Angolan parents. He acquired French nationality on 5 October 2005, through the collective effect of his mother's naturalization.

== Career ==
Panzo started his career with AC Boulogne-Billancourt in France, before moving to FK Baník Most in the Czech second division.

He was called up for training with the Angola national team in Lubango in 2015 while playing for AC Brévinois (AC St Brevin) in the fourth regional tier in Saint-Brevin-les-Pins, France, having scored 16 goals that season. In France between 2012 and 2017, he also played for FC Sarlat, AS Moulins, TVEC Les Sables-d'Olonne and the US Orléans B team. He signed for Syrianska FC in the Superettan in 2017, with the Syrianska and Superettan websites claiming that he scored a goal in three matches for Angola.

On 3 February 2018, Panzo's club FK Panevėžys published a disclaimer saying that they signed him after he demonstrated his skills on the pitch. They stated that they did not know about a "possible match in the Angolan squad" and they apologized for the appearance of incorrect information on their website. On 15 January 2019, he signed for the Vittoriosa Stars in the Maltese First Division.
