= Bob Downs =

English cyclist (born 1954)

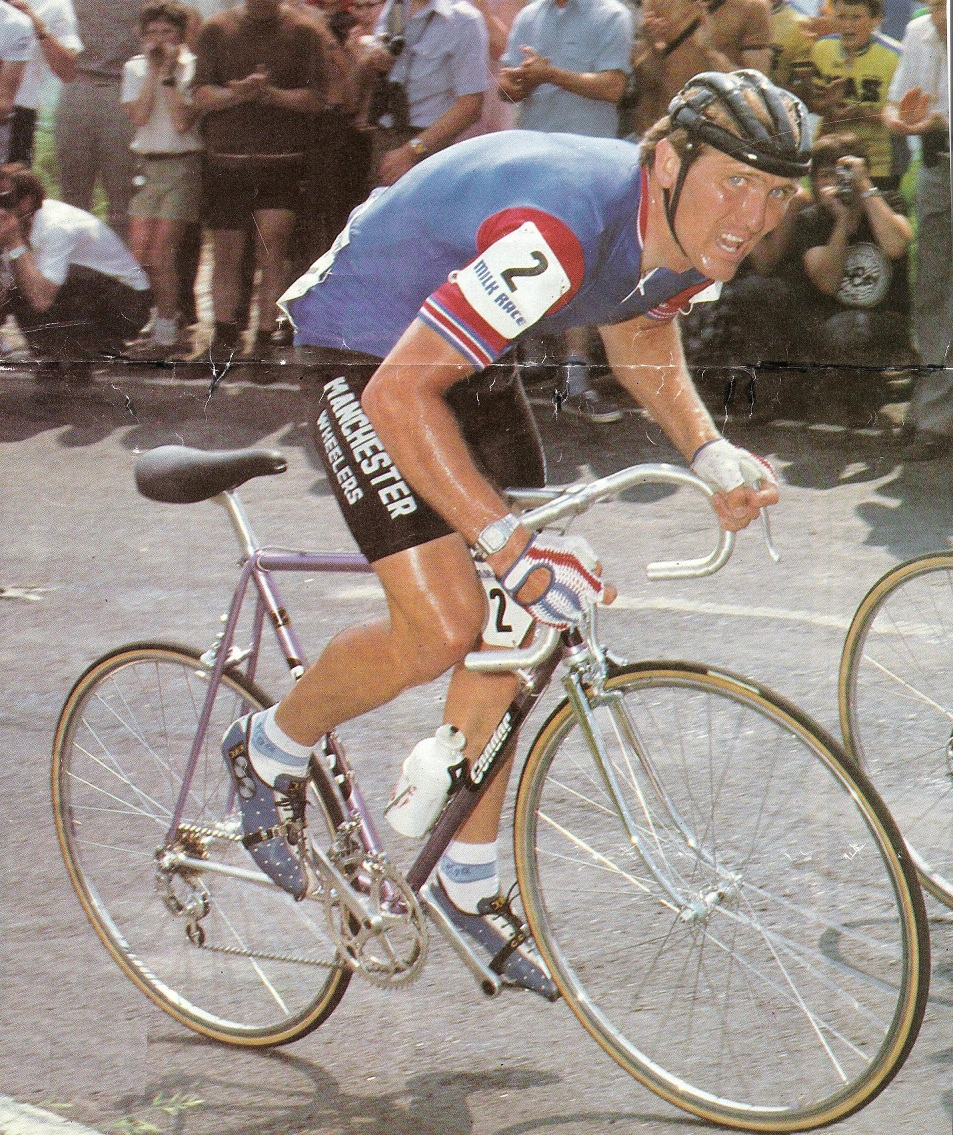
- Bob Downs riding for Great Britain in the Milk Race

Personal information
- Born: 27 July 1955 (age 71) Basildon, Essex, United Kingdom

Cycling career
- Sport: Cycling
- Discipline: Road
- Role: Rider
- Rider type: Time Trialist

Amateur teams
- -: Basildon CC
- -: GS Strada
- -: Manchester Wheelers' Club

Professional team
- 1984–89: Percy Bilton

Major wins
- Sealink International
Medal record
Representing England
Men's road bicycle racing
Commonwealth Games
Gold medal – first place	Brisbane 1982	Team Time Trial

Robert Downs (born 27 July 1955) is a former English professional cyclist from Basildon, Essex.

== Cycling career ==
He won the Sealink International in 1980 and competed at the 1980 Moscow Olympics in the Men's 100 kilometres Team Time Trial.

He represented England in the road race, at the 1978 Commonwealth Games in Edmonton, Alberta, Canada. Four years later he represented England and won a gold medal in the team time trial, at the 1982 Commonwealth Games in Brisbane, Queensland, Australia.

He rode for Manchester Wheelers' Club and was a professional between 1984 and 1989 ending his career with Percy Bilton.

== Palmarès ==
1974
1st Tour of Ireland
19876
3rd in Premier Calendar
1977
1st in Gran Premio della Liberazione
3rd in Stage 3 Milk Race, Sheffield (GBR)
1978
3rd in General Classification Milk Race
11th Commonwealth Games, Road race
1979
1st in Premier Calendar
1980
1st Overall, Sealink International
9th Olympic Games, Team Time Trial (100 km)
1981
4th Overall, Milk Race

2nd in Stage 8 Milk Race, Scarborough
2nd in Stage 11 Milk Race, Harrogate

1st in Premier Calendar
1982
6th Overall, Sealink International
(United Kingdom) 5th British National Road Race Championships (Amateur)
4th Overall, Milk Race

3rd in Stage 8 Milk Race, Skegness

1982 Commonwealth Games
Gold, Team Time Trial (with Malcolm Elliott, Joe Waugh and Steve Lawrence)
10th Brisbane-Sydney
1984
2nd in Milton Keynes
1986
56th Nissan Classic

1987
14th Kellogg's Tour of Britain
3rd in Dublin
1st in Porthcawl
1988
2nd in Stage 3 Milk Race, Plymouth
3rd in South Shields
2nd in Worksop
