= AC Boulogne-Billancourt =

French sports club, based in Paris

- Full name: Athletic Club de Boulogne-Billancourt
- Founded: 18 May 1943; 82 years ago
- Location: Boulogne-Billancourt, France
- Chairman: Jean-Pierre Epars
- Colours: Orange and Gray
- Website: www.acbb.asso.fr

Athletic Club de Boulogne-Billancourt or A.C.B.B. is a French sports club based in the Parisian suburb of Boulogne-Billancourt. The club offers a variety of sports, but is primarily known for cycling, rugby union, judo, figure skating, and swimming. In all sports combined, Boulogne-Billancourt has produced 28 Olympic medalists, 42 World champions, and 67 European champions, if you take into account the sports club predecessor, which comprised seven local sports clubs in the area. The last Olympic medalist was Larbi Benboudaoud, who captured the silver medal at the 2000 Summer Olympics in Sydney, Australia.

== History ==
Athletic Club de Boulogne-Billancourt was founded on 18 March 1943 by Peter Klemann as a result of mergers between seven different sports club located in Boulogne-Billancourt. Under the leadership of the mayor, at the time, Yves Colmar, he urged the following clubs; L'Association Cycliste de Boulogne-Billancourt, U.S.S.O.B., Les Amis de la Boule Ferrée, La Jeunesse Sportive, Lou Païs Athlétic Club, Le Rowing Club de Boulogne, and Les Sauveteurs Marinier to merge in order to form a single entity in the city. As a result, the club was formed and initially began with only 350 members.

In 1963, Boulogne-Billancourt celebrated its 20th anniversary and increased its membership to over 6,000 athletes, who played under 28 branches of sport, which included ice hockey, which had been added two years prior. At the 1992 Summer Olympics, held in Barcelona, Spain, the club was honored with being the best sporting club in Europe and second-best in the world, following three alumnus capturing of two gold medals and one silver. At the start of the new millennium, the club had over 34 branches of sport and increased their membership to over 9,000.

== Sections of sport ==
=== Cycling ===
Memorial commemorating Jacques Anquetil

Athletic Club de Boulogne-Billancourt's cycling section of the club originally began in 1924 under L'Association Cycliste de Boulogne-Billancourt. The cycling section of the club is celebrated as the club's most influential section and is touted as one of the best in France and in the world as the club regularly trains riders from various countries such as England, the Republic of Ireland, Australia, Scotland, and Estonia. The section has produced numerous cycling champions, which include Pierre Adam, André Darrigade, Jean Stablinski, Bernard Thévenet, Stephen Roche, to name a few. One of the most notable cyclists that emerged from the club was Jacques Anquetil who became the first cyclist in the history of the sport to win the Tour de France five times. Anquetil also won two Giro d'Italia, one Vuelta a España, and captured two medals in Olympic competition.

Prior to 1975, the club limited the number of foreign riders who could join. However, in 1975, the club changed their policy and started their very own Foreign Legion, which was composed of international cyclists. The club provided the new riders with bikes, clothes, and accommodation and expenses leaving the rider with the job of training and winning races. Notable international cyclists who started with the club include Phil Anderson, Robert Millar, Paul Kimmage, Sean Yates, Allan Peiper, Seamus Elliott, Jacques Boyer, Graham Jones, Jaan Kirsipuu, John Herety, Matt Stephens and Paul Sherwen.

=== Other sports ===
Other primary sports Athletic Club de Boulogne-Billancourt are relatively strong at are notably judo, kayaking, figure skating, swimming, rugby, and association football.

In judo, the club has produced gold medalists in Cécile Nowak and Catherine Fleury, who both won golds in their respective weight classes at the 1992 Summer Olympics. Nowak had previously been a World champion after winning gold at the 1991 World Judo Championships. Pascal Tayot won a silver medal in his weight class, also at the 1992 Olympics, and later won gold the following year at the 1993 Mediterranean Games. Larbi Benboudaoud was the last medalist in the club's judo section after winning the silver medal at the 2000 Summer Olympics in Sydney, Australia.

In kayaking, the club is notable for having produced World champion Bernard Brégeon who won a gold medal at the 1982 ICF Canoe Sprint World Championships in the K-2 10000 metres event. Brégeon later earned bronze and silver at the 1985 and 1986 events, respectively. The club achieved success at the 1984 Summer Olympics in Los Angeles when Brégeon obtained the silver medal following his performance in the K-2 1000 metres. Brégeon also won the bronze in the K-2 500 metres event. Also at the Olympics, Didier Vavasseur captured the bronze medal in the K-4 1000 metres event.

In swimming, the club hasn't produced many medals, but have sent the likes of David Holderbach, Lionel Poirot, and Frédéric Lefèvre to various Olympic Games ranging from the 1988 Games to 1996. One of the club's notable swimmers was Yann de Frabique, who, though didn't perform well on the Olympic stage, won eight medals in three Summer Universiade Games.

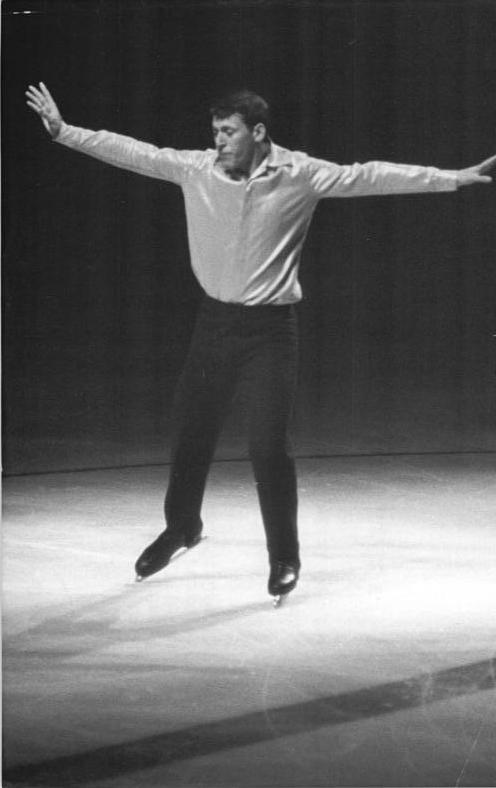
Alain Calmat

In figure skating, Alain Calmat is one of the more notable skaters who originated from the club. Calmat won over 25 medals, which includes five golds at the French Figure Skating Championships, three golds at the European Figure Skating Championships, and one gold at the World Figure Skating Championship. Calmat also won a silver medal at the 1964 Winter Olympics, held in Innsbruck, Austria. Other notable skaters that began their careers at the club include Alain Giletti, an early rival of Calmat, who won over 20 medals, 16 of them gold, Patrick Péra, who succeeded Calmat and Giletti, who won two bronze medals, one each at the 1968 Winter Olympics and the 1972 Games, and Surya Bonaly, who won over 20 medals while active.

In team sports, Boulogne-Billancourt is hardly relevant, excluding the ice hockey team, which has won the Ligue Magnus three times and has also won the prestigious Spengler Cup on three occasions. In rugby, the team is currently playing in Fédérale 2, the fourth division of French rugby. Notable players who have played rugby with the team include Nick Mallett, who currently manages the Italy rugby union national team, Michel Tachdjian, and Abdelatif Benazzi.

In football, the club has struggled with regards to senior football, but has performed well in youth often reaching the final rounds of the Coupe Gambardella. The club unofficially serves as a feeder club to Paris Saint-Germain who often recruit young players from the club. Currently, 16-year-olds Jason Bli and Ilan Boccara are highly sought-after recruits who currently play for Paris Saint-Germain after joining the club from Boulogne-Billancourt. It can also be described the other way around as youth players who are often rejected by Paris Saint-Germain often are recruited by Boulogne-Billancourt. Boulogne-Billancourt regularly send their players to the prestigious Clairefontaine academy.

Notable players that started their careers at the club include Hatem Ben Arfa, who is a French international and currently plays for Paris Saint Germain, Issiar Dia, who is a Senegalese international, Barkley Miguel Panzo who plays for the Angola National team, Loïc Damour, Tripy Makonda, and Ishak Belfodil, who play professionally for Strasbourg, PSG, and Olympique Lyonnais, respectively.

== See also ==
- Category:AC Boulogne-Billancourt (football) players
