= Jeff Williams (cyclist) =

Cyclist from the United Kingdom

Personal information
- Born: 18 August 1958 (age 68) Gorton, Manchester, England

Cycling career
- Sport: Cycling
- Discipline: Road
- Role: Rider
- Rider type: Climber

Amateur teams
- 1979: GS Strada
- 1980: Manchester Wheelers' Club
- 1981: ACBB

Professional teams
- 1986: Raleigh – Weinmann
- 1987: Raleigh – Banana

Major wins
- National Champion (1982)

Jeffrey Williams (born 18 August 1958) is an English former professional road racing cyclist from Manchester. He rode for Great Britain at the Olympic Games, and won several national championship titles.

== Cycling career ==
In 1979 Williams won his first British National Hill Climb Championships setting a new course record that still stands to this day. A rival, Andy Hitchens, who remembers it well, said: "Williams looked like he'd been on starvation rations for months — he was built like a sparrow. Some people assume that there was a howling tailwind that day, but there wasn't. It was sunny, but cool.” In 1980 Williams joined the Manchester Wheelers' Club and was expected to win International honours during the next two or three seasons. Later that year he won his first stage in the Sealink International finishing four minutes clear. However Williams was left disappointed in the National Hill Climb Championships that year beaten into second place by Malcolm Elliott by only one fifth of a second after being knocked off his bike whilst warming up and receiving a broken nose and severe bruising. At the age of 21 Williams competed for Great Britain in the individual road race at the 1980 Moscow Olympic Games. He was sponsored by Harry Hall Cycles. Williams finished 47th, alongside Stephen Roche. At the end of the 1980 season Williams publicly declared his intention of living and racing in France for the 1981 racing calendar with a view to turning professional therefore joining the French club ACBB (Athletic Club de Boulogne Billencourt), Europe's most successful sports club.

In 1982 Williams completed a unique double, of the British Road Race Championship and Hill Climb Championship becoming the first person to do so in the same season. Williams competed in the individual road race at the 1982 Commonwealth Games in Brisbane.

In 1986 he joined Raleigh riding with Paul Sherwen, Mark Bell, Paul Watson and Jon Clay. Williams retired at the end of the 1987 season. He was famed for his hill climbing ability and considered by many to be one of the most exciting riders, he scaled the heights throughout his career, but also plumbed the depths.

== Trivia ==
Williams starred in the intro for the Channel 4 coverage of the Tour de France throughout the late 80s to mid 90s (see video Video on YouTube). The music was composed by Pete Shelley of the Buzzcocks.

== Family Links ==
Jeff was brother-in-law to fellow Olympic cyclist Peter Longbottom (13 May 1959 – 10 February 1998). He is also the younger brother of Mike Williams a former professional rider.

== Palmarès ==
1979
1st Tour of the Peaks
2nd Archer Grand Prix
2nd Overall, Premier Calendar
(United Kingdom) 1st British National Hill Climb Championships
1980
1st stage 5, Sealink International
1st Archer Grand Prix
1st Tour of the Peaks
1st Tour of the Pennines (pro-am)
1st stage 2, Yorkshire Classic (Harrogate)
(United Kingdom) 2nd British National Hill Climb Championships
47th Olympic Games, Road race
1981
1st Porthole Grand Prix
2nd Grand Prix de la Ville de Lillers
2nd Paris – Ezy
2nd Tour of the Peaks
1st stage 2, Sealink International
(United Kingdom) 1st British National Hill Climb Championships
1982
4th Overall, Circuit des Ardennes
4th Overall, Sealink International

1st stage 5, Sealink International

Winner of the British National Road Race Championships (Amateur)
2nd Archer Grand Prix
2nd Overall, Premier Calendar
16th Commonwealth Games, Road race
(United Kingdom) 1st British National Hill Climb Championships
1983
2nd Hanley
6th Tour of the Cotswolds
1984
15th Overall, Milk Race
1985
(United Kingdom) 2nd British National Road Race Championships (Amateur)
1986
3rd Wrekin
12th Overall, Milk Race
60th Overall, Nissan Classic
1987
1st Newby
