= OUCC =

OUCC may be one of the following Oxford University clubs:

- Oxford University Chess Club
- Oxford University Cricket Club
- Oxford University Cycling Club
- Oxford University Cave Club
