= Hillclimbing (cycling) =

Cycling competition of sustained climbing

Hill climbing
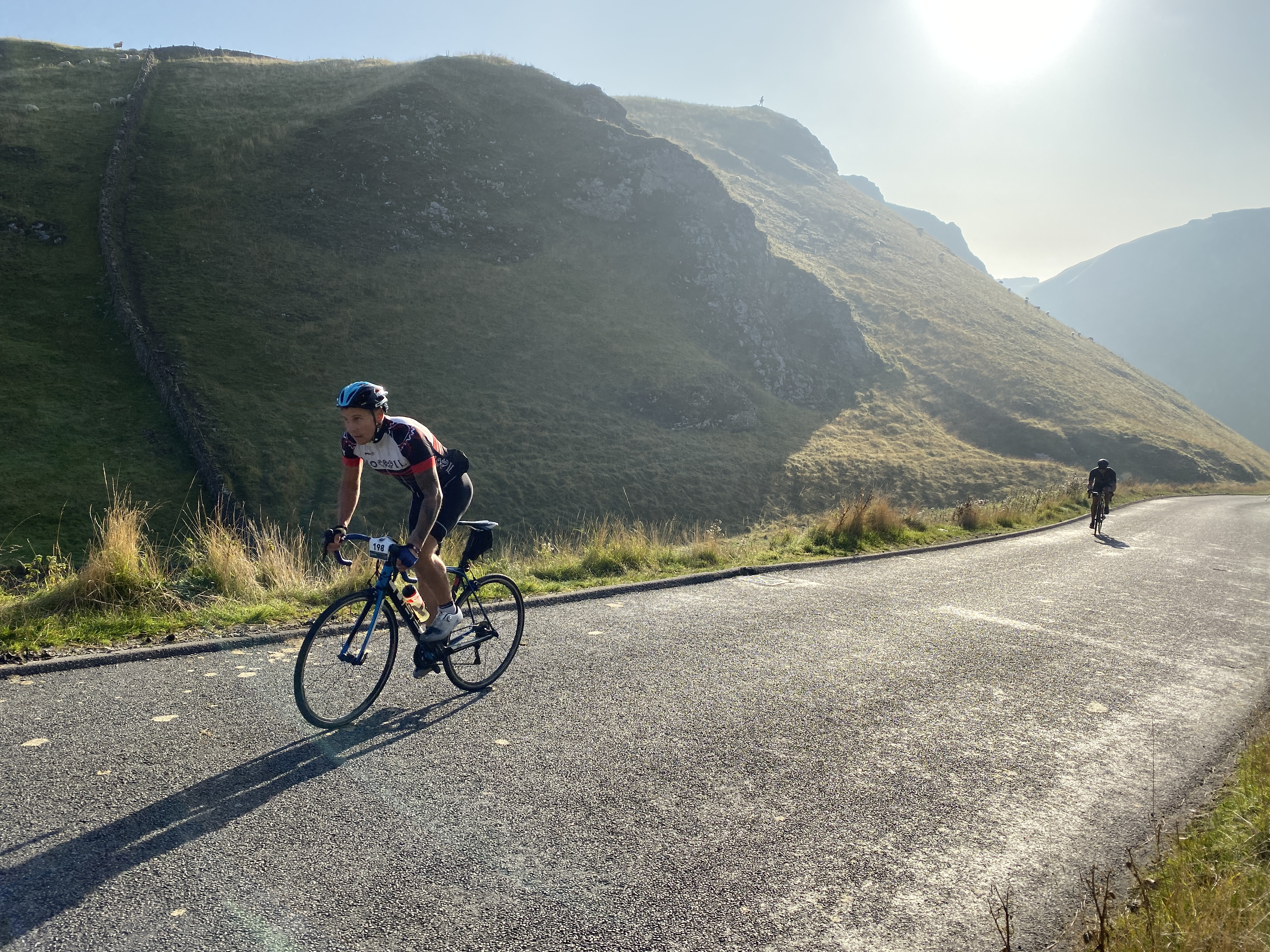
- Winnats Pass was used for the 2021 British Hill Climb National Championship for the first time since 1977
- Highest governing body: UCI
- Nicknames: HC

Characteristics
- Contact: No
- Team members: Individuals
- Mixed-sex: No
- Type: Cycle sport
- Equipment: Road bicycle
- Venue: Paved roads

Presence
- Country or region: Worldwide

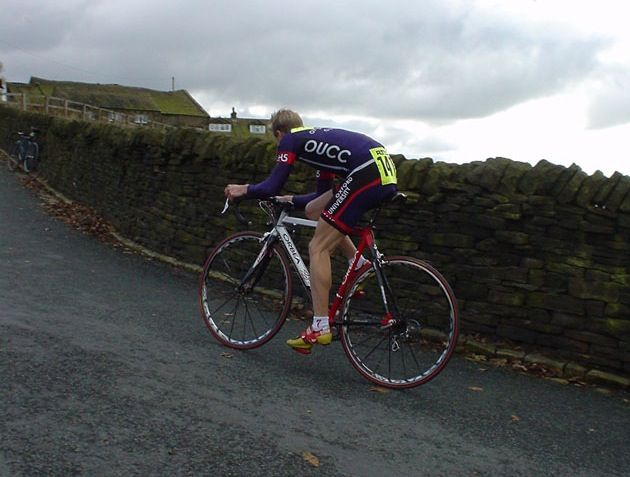
An Oxford University Cycling Club rider on his way to a hillclimbing victory

Hill climbing is a cycling event, as well as a basic skill of the sport. A hill climb is a competition of sustained climbing, that finishes at a higher altitude than the start line. Occasionally featured as stages in major professional races, such as the Tour de France, they are usually referred to as mountain stages. Mountain stages may take the form of a normal road race stage, or as an individual time trial, although time trial stages are not necessarily from the bottom to the top of a hill, and can simply be a time trial over hilly terrain. As events, a hill climb may either be an individual time trial (which forbids cooperation, drafting, or team tactics), a road race or in some cases a gravel race.

== Great Britain ==
In Great Britain, there is an end of season tradition of cycling clubs promoting hillclimb time trials in October for small cash prizes. The hills tend to be relatively short, usually taking between 2 and 15 minutes to complete, making them brutal, all-out efforts where a high power-to-weight ratio is the most crucial factor for success. The races attract many spectators, including locals not otherwise interested in cycling, who come to watch the pain in the faces of the competitors.

Great Dun Fell is the toughest ascent with the men's record held by Andrew Feather and the women's by Illi Gardner. Another popular example of a British Hill Climb is Monsal Hill Climb.

Competitors strive to save as much weight as possible on their equipment, some going as far as to drill holes in their bike. In more recent years, the British hillclimb scene has brought talent to the fore with junior podium riders catching the eye of professional and World Tour cycling teams.

=== British National Champions ===
See British National Hill Climb Championships for men, women and junior results (men's results since 1944).

== USA ==
Notable US hill climbing races include the Mt. Evans Hill Climb, the Mt. Baker Hill Climb, the Mount Washington Auto Road Bicycle Hillclimb, and Broadmoor Cycle to the Summit event on Pikes Peak (which has also been the site of USA Cycling's Hill Climbing National championships)

== See also ==
- List of climbs in cycle racing
