= 2012 UCI Road World Championships – Men's road race =

Men's Individual Road Race
2012 UCI Road World Championships
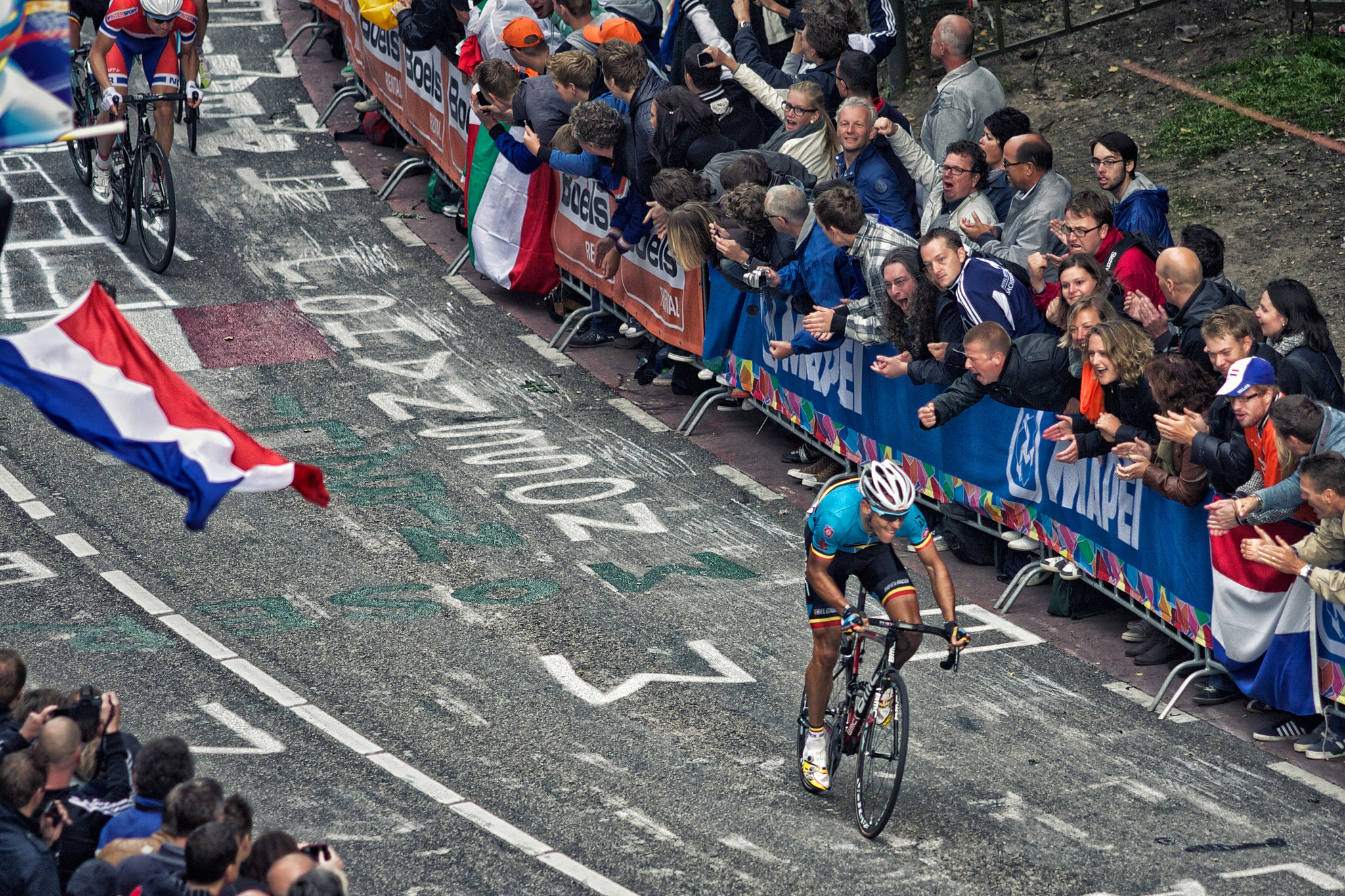
- Philippe Gilbert sprinting to victory

Race details
- Dates: 23 September 2012
- Stages: 1
- Distance: 269 km (167.1 mi)
- Winning time: 6h 10' 41"

Medalists
	Gold	Philippe Gilbert (Belgium)
	Silver	Edvald Boasson Hagen (Norway)
	Bronze	Alejandro Valverde (Spain)

The Men's Individual Road Race of the 2012 UCI Road World Championships cycling event took place on 23 September in the province of Limburg, Netherlands.

The race was won by Belgium's Philippe Gilbert, after he made a late attack on the final ascent of the Cauberg climb and advanced clear of the rest of the field to win his first world title and the first by a Belgian since Tom Boonen won in Madrid in 2005. He finished four seconds clear of Norway's Edvald Boasson Hagen, who claimed the silver medal, while the bronze medal went to Spain's Alejandro Valverde, who finished a second further behind. When the announcement was made of the course, Gilbert was the instant favourite and rode all year with this pressure. Leading into the worlds he had won only two races all season.

== Route ==
The race started in Maastricht and ended in Valkenburg. The first 108 kilometres (67 mi) was contested through a number of Limburg cities before the riders entered a 16.1 kilometres (10.0 mi) circuit to be completed on ten occasions. The finish was 1.7 kilometres (1.1 mi) beyond the summit of the Cauberg hill in Valkenburg – where the Amstel Gold Race had finished from 2003 to 2013, and hosted the finish of stage 3 of the 2006 Tour de France – a 1.5 kilometres (0.93 mi) long climb with a maximum gradient of 12%.

== Final classification ==
Of the race's 207 entrants, 122 riders completed the full distance of 269 km (167.1 mi).

Rank	Rider	Country	Time
1	Philippe Gilbert	Belgium	6h 10' 41"
1	Edvald Boasson Hagen	Norway	+ 4"
1	Alejandro Valverde	Spain	+ 5"
4	John Degenkolb	Germany	+ 5"
5	Lars Boom	Netherlands	+ 5"
6	Allan Davis	Australia	+ 5"
7	Thomas Voeckler	France	+ 5"
8	Ramūnas Navardauskas	Lithuania	+ 5"
9	Sergio Henao	Colombia	+ 5"
10	Óscar Freire	Spain	+ 5"
11	Rui Costa	Portugal	+ 5"
12	Tom Boonen	Belgium	+ 5"
13	Oscar Gatto	Italy	+ 5"
14	Peter Sagan	Slovakia	+ 5"
15	Fredrik Kessiakoff	Sweden	+ 5"
16	Koen de Kort	Netherlands	+ 5"
17	Michael Albasini	Switzerland	+ 5"
18	Assan Bazayev	Kazakhstan	+ 5"
DQ	Jonathan Tiernan-Locke	Great Britain	+ 5"
19	Lars Petter Nordhaug	Norway	+ 5"
20	Simon Gerrans	Australia	+ 5"
21	Not allocated		
22	Stefan Denifl	Austria	+ 5"
23	Rigoberto Urán	Colombia	+ 5"
24	Daniel Moreno	Spain	+ 5"
25	Greg Van Avermaet	Belgium	+ 5"
26	Björn Leukemans	Belgium	+ 5"
27	Fabian Wegmann	Germany	+ 5"
28	Alexandr Kolobnev	Russia	+ 5"
29	Vincenzo Nibali	Italy	+ 5"
30	André Cardoso	Portugal	+ 17"
31	Andriy Hryvko	Ukraine	+ 17"
32	Robert Gesink	Netherlands	+ 17"
33	Dan Martin	Ireland	+ 17"
34	Nicolas Roche	Ireland	+ 17"
35	Jürgen Roelandts	Belgium	+ 17"
36	Ian Stannard	Great Britain	+ 53"
37	Paul Martens	Germany	+ 53"
38	Alberto Contador	Spain	+ 53"
39	Joaquim Rodríguez	Spain	+ 53"
40	Yuri Trofimov	Russia	+ 1' 01"
41	Samuel Sánchez	Spain	+ 1' 37"
42	David Tanner	Australia	+ 1' 37"
43	Andrew Talansky	United States	+ 1' 54"
44	Rene Mandri	Estonia	+ 2' 21"
45	Gustav Larsson	Sweden	+ 2' 21"
46	Marek Rutkiewicz	Poland	+ 2' 21"
47	Carlos Betancur	Colombia	+ 2' 21"
48	Bauke Mollema	Netherlands	+ 2' 21"
49	Rafael Andriato	Brazil	+ 2' 21"
50	Michael Schär	Switzerland	+ 2' 21"
51	Gatis Smukulis	Latvia	+ 2' 21"
52	Chris Anker Sørensen	Denmark	+ 2' 21"
53	Jarosław Marycz	Poland	+ 2' 21"
54	Takashi Miyazawa	Japan	+ 2' 21"
55	Karsten Kroon	Netherlands	+ 2' 21"
56	Tom-Jelte Slagter	Netherlands	+ 2' 21"
57	Sylvain Chavanel	France	+ 2' 21"
58	Radoslav Rogina	Croatia	+ 2' 21"
59	Jan Bárta	Czech Republic	+ 2' 21"
60	Ben Swift	Great Britain	+ 2' 21"
61	Michał Gołaś	Poland	+ 2' 21"
62	Jempy Drucker	Luxembourg	+ 2' 21"
63	Mathias Frank	Switzerland	+ 2' 21"
64	Alex Howes	United States	+ 2' 21"
65	Vladimir Gusev	Russia	+ 2' 21"
66	Niki Terpstra	Netherlands	+ 2' 21"
67	Steve Morabito	Switzerland	+ 2' 21"
68	Winner Anacona	Colombia	+ 2' 21"
69	Nairo Quintana	Colombia	+ 2' 21"
70	Steve Cummings	Great Britain	+ 2' 21"
71	Sérgio Paulinho	Portugal	+ 2' 21"
72	Simon Geschke	Germany	+ 2' 21"
73	Heinrich Haussler	Australia	+ 2' 21"
74	Moreno Moser	Italy	+ 2' 34"
75	Luca Paolini	Italy	+ 2' 46"
76	Rinaldo Nocentini	Italy	+ 2' 46"
77	Marco Marcato	Italy	+ 2' 46"
78	Simon Clarke	Australia	+ 2' 53"
79	Johannes Fröhlinger	Germany	+ 2' 53"
80	Christian Knees	Germany	+ 2' 53"
81	Juan Antonio Flecha	Spain	+ 2' 53"
82	Borut Božič	Slovenia	+ 2' 53"
83	David Veilleux	Canada	+ 2' 53"
84	Mickaël Delage	France	+ 2' 53"
85	Diego Ulissi	Italy	+ 2' 53"
86	Eduard Vorganov	Russia	+ 2' 53"
87	Oleksandr Polivoda	Ukraine	+ 3' 11"
88	Luke Rowe	Great Britain	+ 5' 46"
89	Vladimir Isaichev	Russia	+ 5' 46"
90	Gianni Meersman	Belgium	+ 8' 10"
91	Matej Jurčo	Slovakia	+ 8' 55"
92	Carlos Oyarzun	Chile	+ 8' 55"
93	Aleksandr Kuschynski	Belarus	+ 8' 55"
94	Siarhei Papok	Belarus	+ 8' 55"
95	Stefan Hristov	Bulgaria	+ 8' 55"
96	Evaldas Šiškevičius	Lithuania	+ 8' 55"
97	Carlos José Ochoa	Venezuela	+ 8' 55"
98	Taylor Phinney	United States	+ 8' 55"
99	Péter Kusztor	Hungary	+ 8' 55"
100	Bert-Jan Lindeman	Netherlands	+ 8' 55"
101	Przemysław Niemiec	Poland	+ 8' 55"
102	Jacek Morajko	Poland	+ 8' 55"
103	Brent Bookwalter	United States	+ 8' 55"
104	František Raboň	Czech Republic	+ 8' 55"

Rank	Rider	Country	Time
105	Ronan McLaughlin	Ireland	+ 8' 55"
106	Matthias Brändle	Austria	+ 8' 55"
107	Milan Kadlec	Czech Republic	+ 8' 55"
108	Ryder Hesjedal	Canada	+ 8' 55"
109	Georgi Georgiev	Bulgaria	+ 8' 55"
110	François Parisien	Canada	+ 8' 55"
111	Marcus Burghardt	Germany	+ 8' 55"
112	Thomas Löfkvist	Sweden	+ 8' 55"
113	Leopold König	Czech Republic	+ 8' 55"
114	Tanel Kangert	Estonia	+ 8' 55"
115	Jure Kocjan	Slovenia	+ 8' 55"
116	Zdeněk Štybar	Czech Republic	+ 8' 55"
117	Kristijan Đurasek	Croatia	+ 8' 55"
118	Jacques Janse van Rensburg	South Africa	+ 8' 55"
119	Laurens ten Dam	Netherlands	+ 8' 55"
120	Matteo Trentin	Italy	+ 9' 44"
121	Andrey Amador	Costa Rica	+ 10' 23"
122	Jonathan Castroviejo	Spain	+ 10' 23"
	Jakob Fuglsang	Denmark	DNF
	Kristijan Koren	Slovenia	DNF
	Janez Brajkovič	Slovenia	DNF
	Grega Bole	Slovenia	DNF
	Vasil Kiryienka	Belarus	DNF
	Sergey Firsanov	Slovenia	DNF
	Dimitry Muravyev	Kazakhstan	DNF
	Dario Cataldo	Italy	DNF
	Pablo Lastras	Spain	DNF
	Rein Taaramäe	Estonia	DNF
	Jay Thomson	South Africa	DNF
	Wesley Sulzberger	Australia	DNF
	Adam Hansen	Australia	DNF
	Jérôme Coppel	France	DNF
	Vincent Jérôme	France	DNF
	Yukiya Arashiro	Japan	DNF
	Chris Horner	United States	DNF
	Tejay van Garderen	United States	DNF
	Tony Gallopin	France	DNF
	Kevin De Weert	Belgium	DNF
	Ignatas Konovalovas	Lithuania	DNF
	Gabriel Rasch	Norway	DNF
	Jonathan Monsalve	Venezuela	DNF
	Maxime Bouet	France	DNF
	Martin Grashev	Bulgaria	DNF
	Grégory Rast	Switzerland	DNF
	Oliver Zaugg	Switzerland	DNF
	Bruno Pires	Portugal	DNF
	Roman Kreuziger	Czech Republic	DNF
	Miguel Ángel Rubiano	Colombia	DNF
	Fabio Duarte	Colombia	DNF
	Arthur Vichot	France	DNF
	Richie Porte	Australia	DNF
	Timmy Duggan	United States	DNF
	Michael Matthews	Australia	DNF
	Yeung Ying-Hon	Hong Kong	DNF
	Johan Vansummeren	Belgium	DNF
	Matthew Busche	United States	DNF
	Vladimir Miholjević	Croatia	DNF
	Marko Kump	Slovenia	DNF
	Fabricio Ferrari	Uruguay	DNF
	Julian Dean	New Zealand	DNF
	Yaroslav Popovych	Ukraine	DNF
	Reinardt Janse van Rensburg	South Africa	DNF
	Vitaliy Buts	Ukraine	DNF
	Denys Kostyuk	Ukraine	DNF
	Daniel Schorn	Austria	DNF
	Alexsandr Dyachenko	Kazakhstan	DNF
	Luka Mezgec	Slovenia	DNF
	Hayden Roulston	New Zealand	DNF
	Fumiyuki Beppu	Japan	DNF
	Lucas Euser	United States	DNF
	Jorge Martín Montenegro	Argentina	DNF
	Dmytro Krivtsov	Ukraine	DNF
	Juraj Sagan	Slovakia	DNF
	Maroš Kováč	Slovakia	DNF
	Tomasz Marczyński	Poland	DNF
	Alexandre Pliuschin	Moldova	DNF
	Ben Gastauer	Luxembourg	DNF
	Jérémy Roy	France	DNF
	Peter Velits	Slovakia	DNF
	Matti Breschel	Denmark	DNF
	Chris Froome	Great Britain	DNF
	Bradley Wiggins	Great Britain	DNF
	Jesse Sergent	New Zealand	DNF
	Tomás Gil	Venezuela	DNF
	Stanislav Kozubek	Czech Republic	DNF
	Maximiliano Richeze	Argentina	DNF
	Dries Devenyns	Belgium	DNF
	Laurent Didier	Luxembourg	DNF
	Enzo Moyano	Argentina	DNF
	Shinichi Fukushima	Japan	DNF
	Yukihiro Doi	Japan	DNF
	Alex Dowsett	Great Britain	DNF
	Aleksejs Saramotins	Latvia	DNF
	Mauricio Muller	Argentina	DNF
	Hichem Chaabane	Algeria	DNF
	Mark Cavendish	Great Britain	DNF
	Yusuke Hatanaka	Japan	DNF
	Amir Rusli	Malaysia	DNF
	Svein Tuft	Canada	DNF
	Loh Sea Keong	Malaysia	DNF
	Martin Velits	Slovakia	DNF
	Nebojša Jovanović	Serbia	DNF
	Elchin Asadov	Azerbaijan	DNF
