= Illi Gardner =

British cyclist

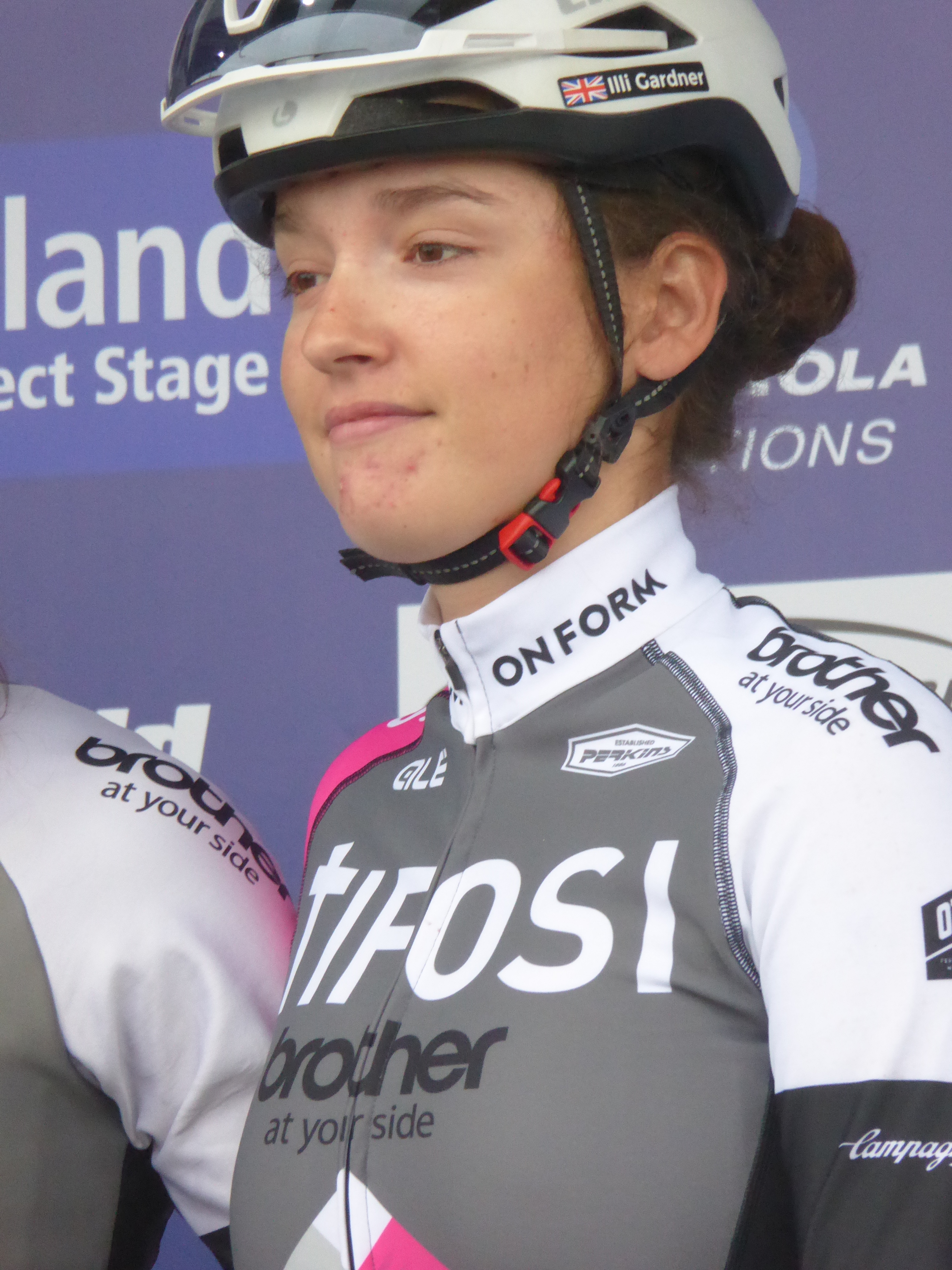
- Gardner at the 2019 Women's Tour of Scotland

Personal information
- Full name: Illi Cerys Gardner
- Born: 14 October 1999 (age 27)
- Height: 5 ft 6 in (168 cm)

Cycling career
- Sport: Cycling
- Discipline: Road
- Role: Rider
- Rider type: Climber

Amateur teams
- 2017: Cardiff Ajax CC
- 2018: YRDP
- 2019: Brother UK–Tifosi

Professional team
- 2020–2021: CAMS–Tifosi

Illi Cerys Gardner (/ˈaɪli ˈkɛrɪs ˈɡɑːdnə/; born 14 October 1999) is a British racing cyclist, who rode professionally for UCI Women's Team CAMS–Basso Bikes in 2020 and 2021. She is a four-time winner of the British National Hill Climb Championships, and holds the fastest two Everesting times recorded by a female rider.

== Career ==
=== 2021 ===
On 14 August, she set a new women's world Everesting record of 8 hours 33 minutes and 47 seconds, beating Emma Pooley's 2020 record by almost 20 minutes by riding up and down Bwlch y Groes 72 times.

=== 2022 ===
On 23 July, she set a further women's world Everesting record of 8 hours 3 minutes and 29 seconds, improving on her previous record by over 30 minutes by riding up and down the Crowcombe climb 59 times.

On 30 October, she won the National Hill Climb Championships by over 23 seconds at the Old Shoe climb near Llangollen in North Wales.

=== 2023 ===
In 2023 she won the first edition of the Championnats d'Europe des Grimpeurs, which took place in Switzerland on the legendary 12.78-kilometre (7.94-mile) climb from Airolo to the 2,091-metre (6,860-foot) Gotthard Pass.

On 29 October, she won the National Hill Climb Championships for the second time by 59 seconds at the Struggle climb to Kirkstone Pass ascending from Ambleside in Cumbria.

=== 2024 ===
On 27 October, she won the National Hill Climb Championships for the third time by 12 seconds at the Dipton Mill Road climb in Hexham, Northumbria.

=== 2025 ===
On 20 September, she became Everesting world champion on Mount Etna.

=== 2026 ===
On 26 September, she defended her title to become Everesting world champion for the second time on Mount Etna.

On 26 October, she won the National Hill Climb Championships for the fourth time by 40 seconds at the Porlock Toll Road climb in Porlock, Somerset.

== Major results ==
2022
1st National Hill Climb Championships
2023
1st Championnats d'Europe des Grimpeurs
1st National Hill Climb Championships
2024
1st National Hill Climb Championships
2025
1st Mount Washington Hillclimb (with new official record of 58:01)
2nd National Hill Climb Championships
2026
1st National Hill Climb Championships
