= Edward Laverack =

British cyclist

Ed Laverack
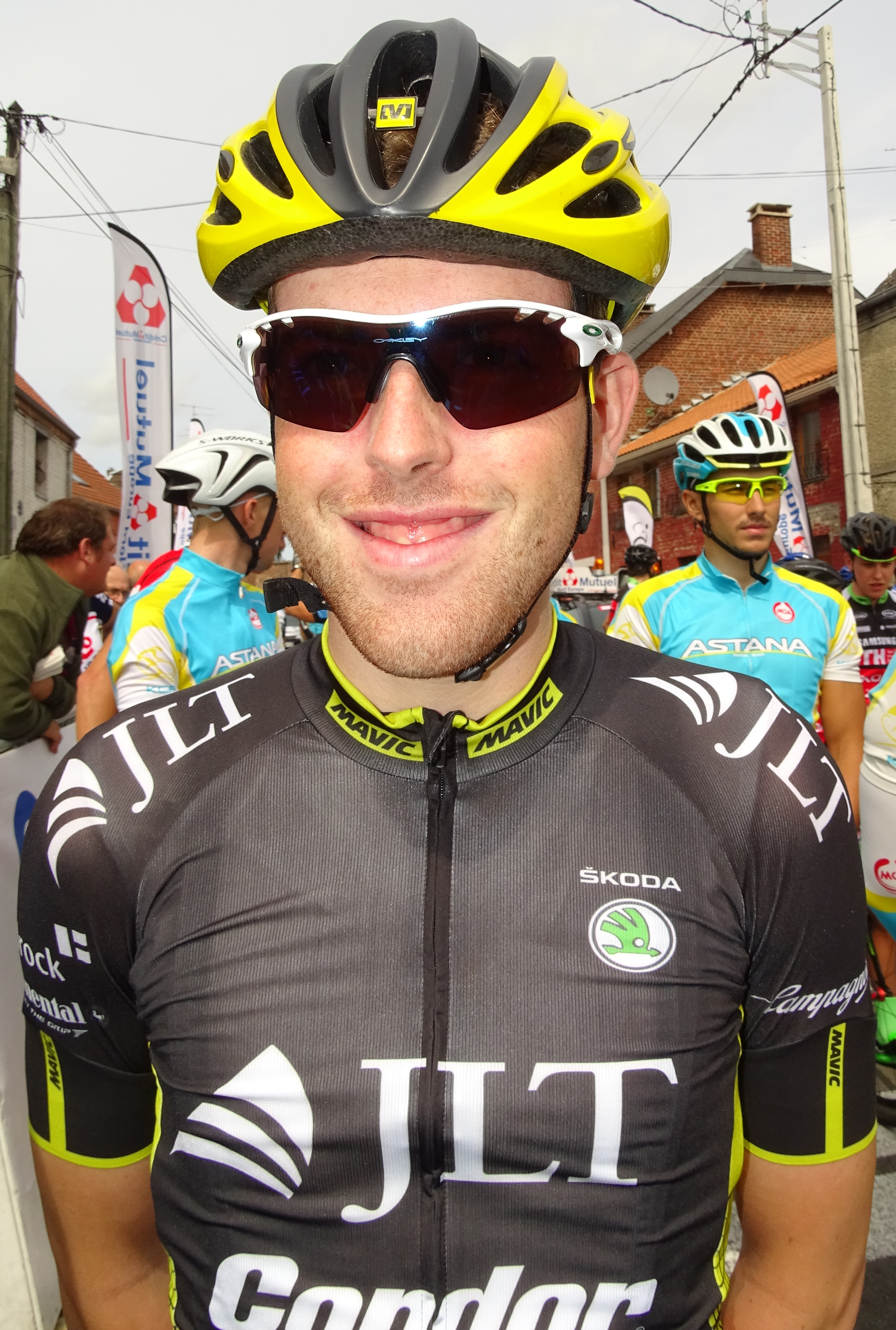
- Laverack at the 2015 Grand Prix des Marbriers

Personal information
- Full name: Edward Laverack
- Nicknames: Lavers; The Welsh Dragon
- Born: 27 July 1994 (age 32) Llanelli, Carmarthenshire, Wales
- Height: 1.77 m (5 ft 10 in)
- Weight: 59 kg (130 lb)

Cycling career
- Sport: Cycling
- Disciplines: Road; Gravel
- Role: Rider
- Rider type: Climber

Amateur teams
- 2011–2012: Bynea Cycling Club
- 2020: Saint Piran
- 2020: VAMos.CC
- 2021–2022: Bynea Cycling Club
- 2024: Backpedal

Professional teams
- 2013–2018: Rapha Condor–JLT
- 2019: SwiftCarbon Pro Cycling

Edward Laverack (born 27 July 1994) is a British cyclist and YouTuber from Wales. Predominantly a climber, Laverack rode professionally between 2013 and 2019 for UCI Continental teams JLT–Condor and SwiftCarbon Pro Cycling, and he was the winner of the 2019 British National Hill Climb Championships.

== Career ==
Born in Llanelli, Laverack attended Bryngwyn Comprehensive School (Welsh: Ysgol Bryngwyn). At the age of 14 he was inspired to have a go at cycling having witnessed Nicole Cooke's performance at the 2008 Olympic Games. Having started racing at the age of 17 with Bynea Cycling Club in 2011, Laverack joined British UCI Continental team Rapha Condor–JLT in 2013. The following year he won the under-23 race at the British National Road Race Championships, finishing 13th overall.

He moved to UCI continental team SwiftCarbon Pro Cycling for the 2019 season, and won the British National Hill Climb Championships later that year in Haytor Vale, Devon, setting a new course record in the process. He returned to the podium in 2023, finishing second to Andrew Feather on The Struggle in Ambleside.

== Major results ==
2014
1st Road race, National Under-23 Road Championships
2016
10th Overall Tour de Korea
2019
1st National Hill Climb Championships
2023
2nd National Hill Climb Championships
