= Phil Prosser =

British Army Officer and Engineer

Lieutenant General Phil Prosser CBE
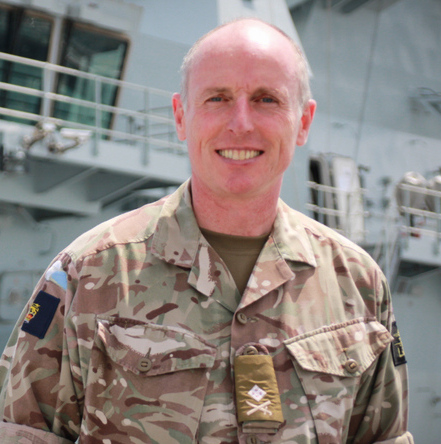
- Prosser in 2023
- Education: Royal Military College of Science; Open University
- Military career
- Allegiance: United Kingdom
- Branch: British Army
- Service years: 1992–present
- Rank: Lieutenant General
- Commands: 101 Logistic Brigade
- Conflicts: Kosovo War; Iraq War; War in Afghanistan

Lieutenant General Phillip David Prosser CBE (born c. 1972) is a senior British Army officer and engineer. Since 2026, he has been Chief of Defence Logistics and Support. He previously served as Director Joint Support, UK Strategic Command, and was commander of 101 Logistic Brigade. During the COVID-19 pandemic, Prosser was head of the Army's Operation Iron Viper to help Britain's National Health Service administer vaccines against the coronavirus.

== Early life and education ==
Phillip Prosser is from Llanelli, Wales. He was educated at Bryngwyn Comprehensive School before attending Welbeck College in Nottinghamshire where he completed his A Levels. He later attended the Royal Military College of Science at Shrivenham gaining a degree in mechanical engineering. He later completed an Master of Business Administration (MBA) from the Open University. He is a chartered mechanical engineer.

== Military career ==
Prosser attended the Royal Military Academy Sandhurst, and was commissioned in the Royal Electrical and Mechanical Engineers, British Army as a second lieutenant on 12 December 1992. He was promoted to lieutenant on 12 December 1994, and to captain on 12 December 1997. His early career was served in the 5th Airborne Brigade' logistics battalion, the REME workshop attached to 19th Regiment Royal Artillery and 5 Force Support Battalion REME. As a junior officer, he served with his units in the Kosovo War and Iraq War.

Prosser completed three operational tours of Afghanistan. From 2010 to 2011, he attended the Advanced Command Staff Course for military officers tipped for senior leadership roles.

From July 2019 to May 2021, he was commander of the 101st Logistic Brigade. He helped to distribute PPE to hospitals during the first coronavirus lockdown in March 2020. From May 2021 to February 2023, he served as assistant chief of staff (equipment), based at Headquarters Field Army. In December 2021, he was appointed head of the Army's Operation Iron Viper to help Britain's NHS administer COVID-19 vaccines during the coronavirus pandemic in the UK.

He was appointed Commander of the Order of the British Empire (CBE) in the 2021 New Year Honours.

Brigadier Prosser was promoted to major general on 13 February 2023, as he took up the position as Director Joint Support at United Kingdom Strategic Command. He was appointed a Colonel-Commandant of the Royal Electrical and Mechanical Engineers on 1 June 2025.

In January 2026, it was announced that Prosser would take over the position of Chief of Defence Logistics later in the year. On 6 November 2026, he was promoted to lieutenant general and took up the position, in succession to Vice Admiral Sir Andy Kyte.
