= The Gurkha Welfare Trust =

- Founded: 1969
- Type: Charitable organisation
- Purpose: Gurkha veterans and their dependants
- Location: Salisbury, United Kingdom
- Region served: Nepal and worldwide
- Chairman: Lieutenant General Richard Wardlaw, OBE
- Website: www.gwt.org.uk

The Gurkha Welfare Trust is a British charity (Reg. Charity No. 1103669) established in 1969. It is the principal UK charity for the provision of aid to Gurkha ex-servicemen and their dependants in their homeland of Nepal, and increasingly in the UK and elsewhere.

Nepal has limited industry, agriculture and infrastructure. It also lacks an effective public social welfare system. This means that the work of the Trust is critical in improving conditions for ex-servicemen and their dependants, who are often unable to work through age, illness or injury.

The Patron of the Trust is Charles III. The Vice Patron is Joanna Lumley OBE.

Each year, by tradition, all serving officers and other ranks in the Brigade of Gurkhas contribute a day's pay to the Trust.

== History ==
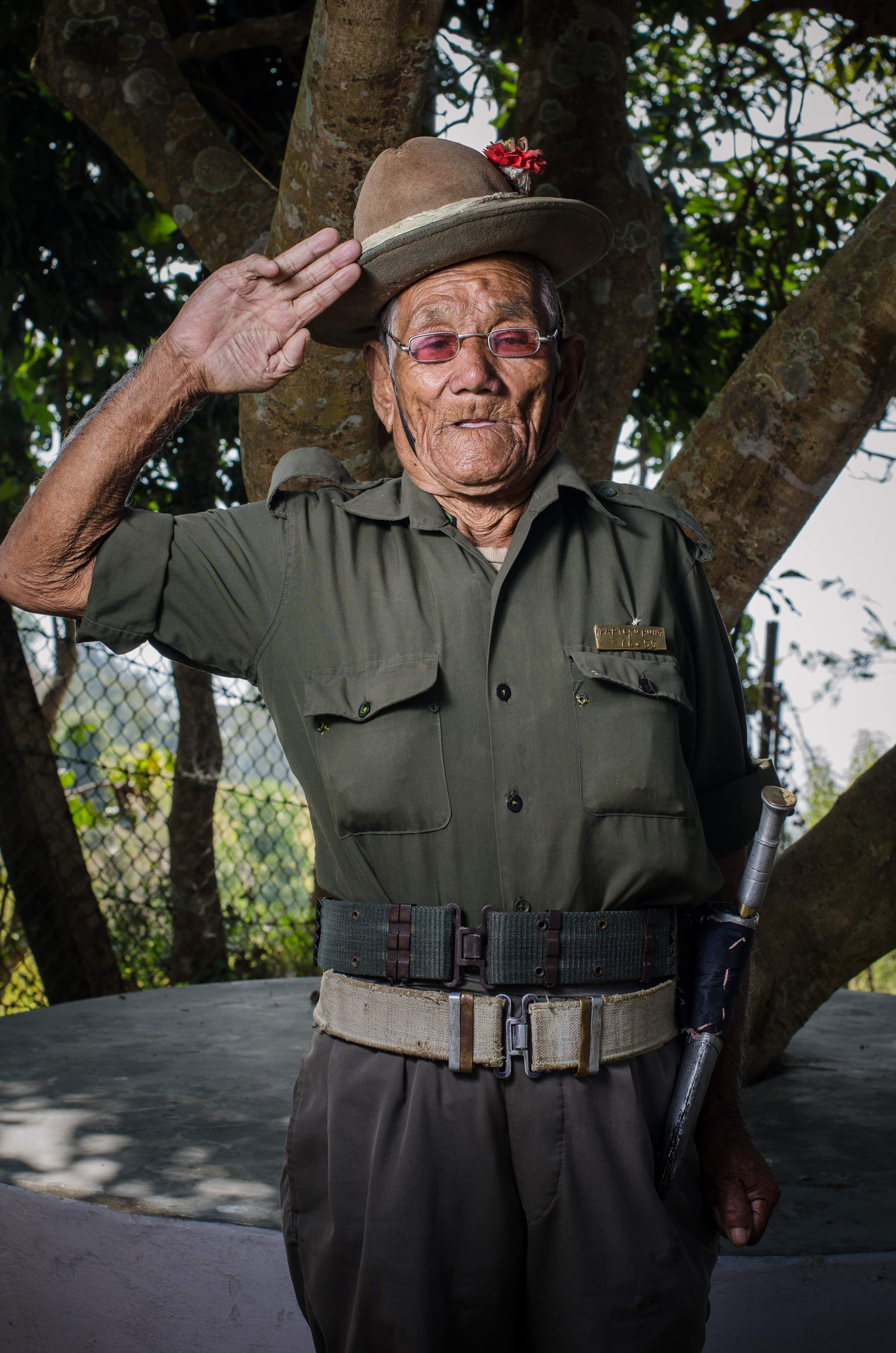
Rfn Parte Gurung, a Gurkha veteran receiving aid from The Gurkha Welfare Trust.

In 1969, it was realised that a great number of Gurkha soldiers and their dependants or widows in Nepal faced destitution in old age. Many of these soldiers had served in the Second World War; however they had not served the 15 years needed to qualify for an army pension. Unlike their British counterparts who could rely on the welfare state in old age, the Nepalese Gurkha had no such safety net.

In recognition of the country's debt of honour to these soldiers, a public appeal – organised by British Gurkha officers – raised £1m to establish The Gurkha Welfare Trust. It began to create a network of bases in Nepal to distribute financial aid to retired soldiers who had met with disasters such as landslides and floods. The Trust also bought land for ex-Gurkhas to become subsistence farmers and provide enough food to support their families.

In an arrangement that endures to this day, the Trust agreed on a deal that its administrative costs would be largely met by a grant in aid funding from the Ministry of Defence.

== Activity in Nepal ==
Today, the Trust's field delivery arm – The Gurkha Welfare Scheme – employs around 400 staff members in Nepal. Its footprint includes 21 operational bases (Area Welfare Centres) across Nepal that are run by former Gurkhas, as well as one in Darjeeling, India. Each day, elderly veterans come to these centres with their health and welfare needs. Every quarter, a steady stream of Gurkha veterans walk anything up to two or three days to claim their pensions.

The Trust pays a monthly stipend to around 5,800 needy Gurkha ex-servicemen and widows in Nepal who do not receive a military pension (15 years' of military service is required to earn such a pension). Medical treatment is also provided for them and their dependants. In addition, hardship grants are awarded to alleviate destitution following the fire, flood and other natural disasters. The Trust runs two Residential Homes in Pokhara and Dharan, offering full-time care for some of its most vulnerable pensioners.

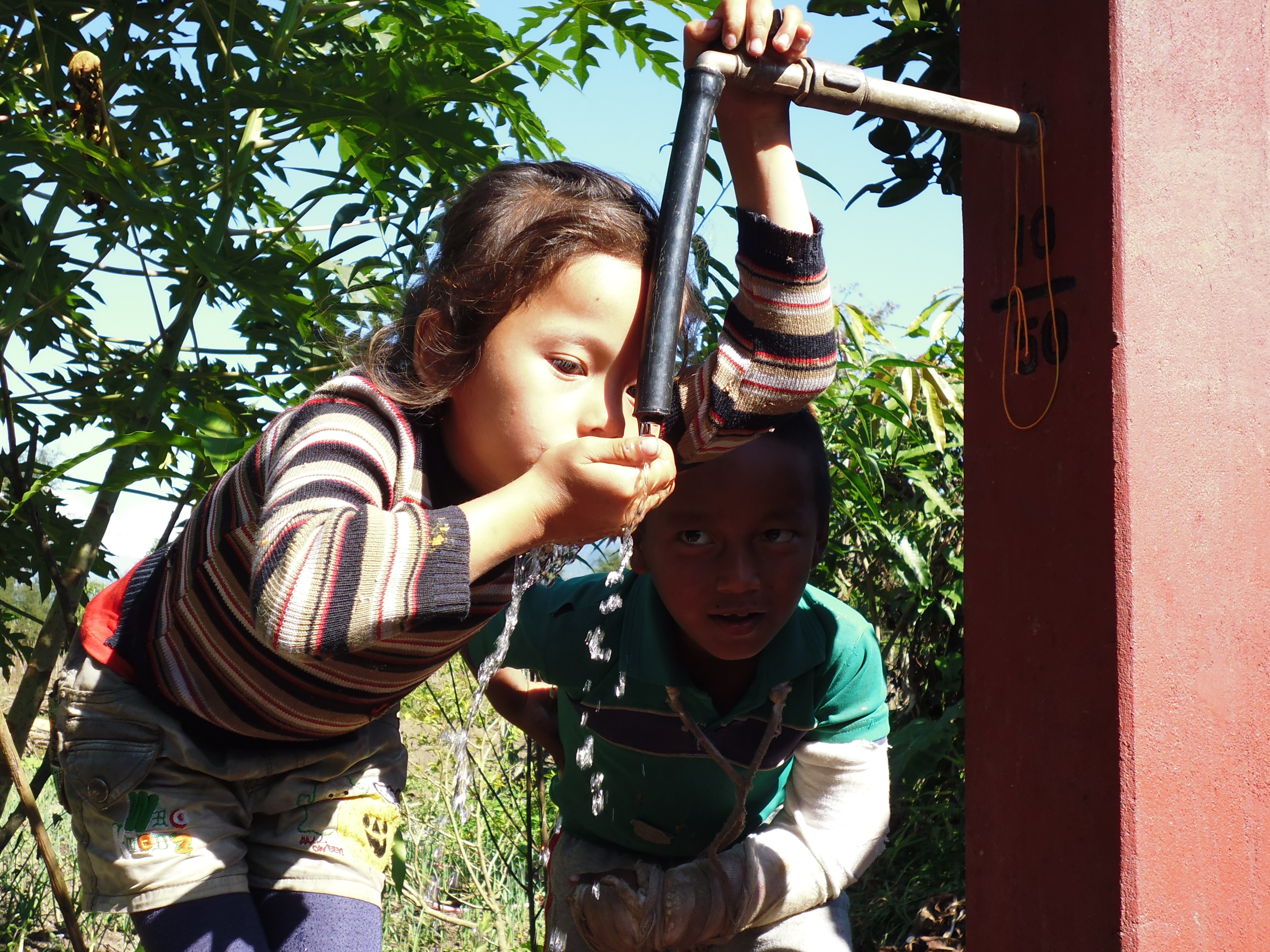
Nepali children drink from a tap stand built by The Gurkha Welfare Trust in Bharat Pokhari, a village in western Nepal.

In addition to its relief work for Gurkha veterans, the Trust also invests in Community Aid projects for the wider Nepalese population. It has built 137 new schools and runs an extensive renovation programme for dilapidated schools, improving access to education for over 550,000 Nepali children since the programme began in 1989. Enhancements in existing schools include tap stands, libraries and science laboratories.

The Trust also runs an extensive Rural Water and Sanitation Programme in Nepal, supported by DFID. Clean water supply systems and sanitation schemes are introduced to around 120 villages across the country each year, drastically reducing sickness rates and labour hours in those communities. To date, over 300,000 people in around 1,400 villages have benefited from the Trust's water projects.

With funding from the Kadoorie Agricultural Aid Association, the Trust organises eight annual open medical camps, performing thousands of dental extractions and cataract operations while offering free GP and gynaecology checks, performing minor surgery and distributing free medication. Around 14,500 Nepali people benefit from these camps each year.

== Activity in the UK ==
Following a change in legal status in 2009, many Gurkhas who retired pre-1997 chose to move to the UK permanently. The Trust runs two Gurkha Welfare Advice Centres in Salisbury and in Aldershot to assist Gurkha pensioners in their transition to life in the UK. The Advice Centres also provide outreach surgeries in communities where there are significant Gurkha populations.

== North American branches ==
Gurkha Welfare Appeal (Canada) was active between 1973 and 2004.

Gurkha Welfare Trust Foundation (USA) was established in 1978 by Ellice McDonald Jr.

== Nepal earthquakes in 2015 ==
Following the magnitude 7.8 earthquake that struck Nepal in April 2015, The Gurkha Welfare Trust was among the first relief organisations to respond to the disaster, making use of its extensive local footprint to deploy patrol teams including mobile doctors. The teams distributed emergency financial, medical and material aid such as food and shelter in affected regions across the country.

In the UK, the Trust launched an Earthquake Response appeal. In the longer term, the charity committed to rebuilding the 1,100 homes for the Gurkha veterans and widows who were left homeless. It also pledged to build and repair hundreds of schools and water projects in affected areas.

The Trust's response was supported by troops from the UK Brigade of Gurkhas, predominantly of the Queen's Gurkha Engineers, who assisted with relief distribution and reconstruction projects.

== Gurkha 200 ==
2015 marked the bicentenary of Gurkha service to the British Crown. In recognition of this historic milestone, various commemorative events took place throughout the year to celebrate the Gurkhas’ contribution to the British Army and raise funds for The Gurkha Welfare Trust.

A number of commemorative expeditions were planned in 2015. On 9 June, hundreds of serving soldiers took part in a fundraising Pageant organised by The Gurkha Welfare Trust, attended by the Queen and other members of the royal family.

The Gurkha 200 campaign was supported by a number of celebrities, including Joanna Lumley and Dan Snow, who narrated at the Gurkha 200 Pageant on 9 June. Lumley, whose father served in the 6th Gurkha Rifles, is a Vice Patron of the Trust.

All proceeds raised through the Gurkha 200 campaign were dedicated to The Gurkha Welfare Trust's welfare and relief activity in Nepal.
