= Joseph Sunde Memorial =

Road cycling race in Australia

The Joseph Sunde Memorial is a single day road cycling race held at Heffron Park in Australia. The race exists of only a men's race.

== Past winners ==
Year	Winner
2013	
2012	(Australia) Philip Grenfell
2011	(Australia) Liam Kelly
2010	(Australia) Ben Kersten
2009	(Australia) Robert Cater
2008	(Australia) Trent Wilson
2007	(Australia) Shaun Higgerson
2006	(Australia) Jeffrey Hopkins
2005	(Australia) Chris Sutton
2004	(Australia) Troy Glennan
2003	(Australia) Graeme Moffet
2002	(Australia) Jeffrey Hopkins
2001	(Netherlands) Jens Mouris
2000	(United Kingdom) Stuart Dangerfield
1999	(Australia) Brent Dawson
1998	(Australia) Matt White
1997	(Australia) Anthony Spurgeon
1996	(Australia) Christian Back
1995	(Australia) Tony Gaudry
1994	(Australia) Andrew McGee
