= Ronnie Stringwell =

British bicycle racer

Ronnie Stringwell is a former amateur cyclist who won the British National Hill Climb Championships at the age of 22 in 1950, and retained the title in 1951. A member of Bramley Wheelers Cycling Club in Leeds, his career was short-lived. He damaged an ankle in an accident when leading in a race on Winnats Pass in November 1951 which ultimately resulted in his early retirement.

Ronnie Stringwell was 22 when he won the National Hill Climb Championship in 1950 on Barbers Hill, Llangollen, North Wales, beating the previous years champion Bob Maitland into second place.

- 1st - R. Stringwell Bramley Wheelers CC - 4 mins 33 2/5secs
- 2nd - B. Maitland Concorde RCC - 4 mins 35 1/5secs
- 3rd - B. Robinson Huddersfield RC - 4 mins 39 secs

In 1951 he repeated his success by winning again at Saintbury Hill in Gloucestershire; he was the only rider other than Ken Joy to retain a championship title won in 1950.

There can be no doubt that he proved himself worthy of this honour with a performance that not only dwarfed his competitors but once again demonstrated the qualities of a true champion. The first climb of note on the day was Peter Proctor whose time stood as fastest for a long while until Brian Robinson rode up in a record time 13 seconds faster than Proctor. No one thought this could be bettered, particularly when the times of riders the calibre of Maitland, Pentecost and Haskell were considered, but the measure of Stringwell’s victory lies in the 4 and 1/5th seconds by which he beat Robinson with Proctor relegated to third place.

- 1st - R. Stringwell Bramley Wheelers CC - 6 mins 26 secs
- 2nd - B. Robinson Huddersfield RC - 6 mins 30 1/5 secs
- 3rd - P. Proctor Western Command CC - 6 mins 43 2/5 secs

Ronnie was member of the winning Bramley Wheelers team in 1953 and the club went on to win the event every year from 1953 to 1959.

- 1953 - 1st: R Stringwell, 2nd: R Franklin, 3rd: F E Buckley
- 1954 - 1st: R Franklin, 2nd: E Harrison, 3rd: F E Buckley
- 1955 - 1st: V Caswell, 2nd: F E Buckley, 3rd: R Franklin
- 1956 - 1st: V Caswell, 2nd: F E Buckley, 3rd: R Franklin
- 1957 - 1st: N A Smith, 2nd: F E Buckley, 3rd: E Harrison
- 1958 - 1st: N A Smith, 2nd: F E Buckley, 3rd: R Franklin
- 1959 - 1st: N A Smith, 2nd: V F Caswell, 3rd: R Franklin
