= Bryngwyn Comprehensive School =

School in Carmarthenshire, Wales

Coordinates: 51.6941°N 4.1376°W

- Llanelli, Carmarthenshire, SA14 8RP

Information
- Established: 1977
- Department for Education URN: 6694054 Tables
- Head of school: Rhys Corcoran
- Executive headteacher: Rob Jones

Bryngwyn Comprehensive School is a mixed-gender English-medium secondary school located in Llanelli, Carmarthenshire, Wales teaching pupils from ages 11–16.

Notable pupils include professional cyclist Edward Laverack and Major General Phil Prosser, who was in charge of the army's operation to support the NHS with the COVID-19 vaccine rollout.

James "Flex" Lewis (born 15 November 1983) is a Welsh former bodybuilder and has won 7 consecutive 212 Mr. Olympia titles.

Famous staff include Tonia Antoniazzi, the MP for Gower and former Welsh Women's International Rugby star.

== History ==
The school was opened in 1977 by Baron Elwyn-Jones.
