= British National Hill Climb Championships =

Hill climbing competition

Supporters gather to watch the National Hill Climb.

The British National Hill Climb Championship is a hill climbing competition held annually by Cycling Time Trials with the location varying year on year. The first edition was in 1944 and it has been won by some of the best all-round British cyclists, such as Brian Robinson, Paul Curran, Malcolm Elliot, Chris Boardman and Jeff Williams.

Historically, competitors often chose to use a fixed gear bicycle for lower weight and the ability to maintain pedalling momentum. Due to advances in gearing technology, geared bikes have dominated the field over the past decade.

== Open results ==
Year	Hill	Gold	Silver	Bronze
2026	Porlock Toll Road (Porlock), Somerset	Ed Laverack*	Andrew Feather	Rowan Baker
2025	Bank Road, (Matlock), Derbyshire	Harry Macfarlane	Kieran Wynne-Cattanach	Andrew Feather
2024	Dipton Mill Road, Hexham, Northumberland	Harry Macfarlane	Andrew Feather	Kieran Wynne-Cattanach
2023	The Struggle, (Kirkstone Road), Cumbria	Andrew Feather	Ed Laverack	Patrick Clark
2022	The Old Shoe, Horseshoe Pass, Denbighshire	Andrew Feather	Tom Bell	Richard Bussell
2021	Winnats Pass, Derbyshire	Tom Bell	Andrew Feather	Andy Nichols
2020	Streatley Hill, Berkshire	Andrew Feather	Tom Bell	Adam Kenway
2019	Haytor Vale, Devon	Ed Laverack	Paul Double	Richard Bussell
2018	Pea Royd Lane, Stocksbridge	Andrew Feather	Calum Brown	Adam Kenway
2017	Hedley Hill, Northumberland	Dan Evans	Adam Kenway	Kieran Savage
2016	Bank Road, Matlock, Derbyshire	Adam Kenway	Isaac Mundy	James Lowden
2015	Jackson Bridge, Holmfirth, West Yorkshire	Richard Bussell	Dan Evans	Joe Clark
2014	Pea Royd Lane, Stocksbridge, Sheffield, South Yorkshire	Dan Evans	Matt Clinton	Adam Kenway
2013	The Stang, Yorkshire	Tejvan Pettinger	James Gullen	Matt Clinton
2012	The Rake, Ramsbottom	Jack Pullar	Gunnar Gronlund	Matt Clinton
2011	Long Hill, Buxton, Derbyshire	Gunnar Gronlund	Richard Handley	Matt Clinton
2010	Dover's Hill, Gloucestershire	Dan Fleeman	Matt Clinton	Michael Smith
2009	Pea Royd Lane, Stocksbridge, Sheffield, South Yorkshire	Dan Fleeman	Matt Clinton	Jim Henderson
2008	Bank Road, Matlock	Matt Clinton	Bill Bell	Jim Henderson
2007	Cheddar Gorge, Somerset	James Dobbin	David Clarke	Matt Clinton
2006	Peak Hill, Sidmouth, Devon	James Dobbin	David Clarke	Jonathan Dayus
2005	The Rake, Ramsbottom	Ben Greenwood	Jim Henderson	David Clarke
2004	Winter's Gibbet, Elsdon, Northumberland	Jonathan Dayus	James Dobbin	Alex Coutts
2003	Halifax Lane, Luddenden	Jim Henderson	Mark Lovatt	David Clarke
2002	Cat and Fiddle, Cheshire	Mark Lovatt	Michael Hutchinson	Ian Stott
2001	Y Bwlch, Ruthin	Jim Henderson	Tom Anderson	Chris Myhill
2000	West Close Hill, Rodney Stoke, Somerset	Jim Henderson	Tom Anderson	Ian Stott
1999	The Rake, Ramsbottom	Jim Henderson	Jeff Wright	Richard Taylor
1998	Dover's Hill, Weston sub Edge, Gloucestershire	Jim Henderson	Jeff Wright	Gary Baker
1997	Rowsley Bar, Derbyshire	Stuart Dangerfield	Jim Henderson	Jeff Wright
1996	Carlton Bank, Cleveland	Stuart Dangerfield	Steve Hulme	Jim Henderson
1995	Ditchling Beacon, East Sussex	Stuart Dangerfield	Jeff Wright	Chris Newton
1994	Jackson Bridge, West Yorkshire	Jeff Wright	Stuart Dangerfield	Rob Harris
1993	Newlands Pass, Buttermere, Cumbria	Stuart Dangerfield	Jeff Wright	Rob Reynolds-Jones
1992	St John's Chapel, County Durham	Stuart Dangerfield	Jeff Wright	Peter Longbottom
1991	Park Rash, Kettlewell, Yorkshire	Chris Boardman	Jeff Wright	Stuart Dangerfield
1990	Widecombe-in-the-Moor, Devon	Chris Boardman	Steve Marchant	Stuart Dangerfield
1989	The Burway, Church Stretton, Shropshire	Chris Boardman	Scott O'Brien	Steve Marchant
1988	Nick O' Pendle, Sabden, Lancashire	Chris Boardman	Phil Sheard	Paul Curran
1987	Rosedale Chimney, North Yorkshire	Paul Curran	Chris Boardman	Steve Marchant
1986	Riber Hill, Matlock, Derbyshire	Darryl Webster	Steve Marchant	C. Walker
1985	Challacombe Hill, Woolacombe, Devon	Darryl Webster	Steve Marchant	Karl Smith
1984	Crawleyside, Stanhope, County Durham	Darryl Webster	Steve Marchant	Karl Smith
1983	Weston Hill, Bath	Darryl Webster	Mark Noble	Phil Mason
1982	Dover's Hill, Weston sub Edge, Gloucestershire	Jeff Williams	Keith Reynolds	Dave Jarvis
1981	Bwlch yr Oernant (Horseshoe Pass), Llangollen	Jeff Williams	Malcolm Elliott	Callum Gough/Darryl Webster tied
1980	Nick O' Pendle, Lancashire	Malcolm Elliott	Jeff Williams	Gareth Armitage
1979	Haytor Vale, Devon	Jeff Williams	Dave Pitman	Gareth Armitage
1978	Dover's Hill, Gloucestershire	Gareth Armitage	Chris Miller	John Parker
1977	Winnats Pass, Derbyshire	John Parker	Gareth Armitage	Ian Moore
1976	Horseshoe Pass	Joe Waugh	Dave Pitman	S Johnson
1975	Nick O'Pendle	Gareth Armitage	Paul Carbutt	Joe Waugh
1974	Holme Moss, West Yorkshire	Joe Waugh	Colin Berry	Ron Martin
1973	Dover's Hill, Gloucestershire	Granville Sydney	Jack Kershaw	Paul Wildsmith
1972	Winnats Pass, Derbyshire	Granville Sydney	John Clewarth	Paul Wildsmith
1971	Bwlch yr Oernant, Llangollen	John Clewarth	D Lloyd	W Moore
1970	Nick O'Pendle	Granville Sydney	Ralph Wilson	Tony Gornall
1969	Llywel, Brecknockshire	Granville Sydney	Claude Kearley	Ralph Wilson
1968	Dover's Hill, Gloucestershire	Pete Gannon	Paul Wildsmith	Granville Sydney
1967	Winnats Pass, Derbyshire	Paul Wildsmith	G Clements	Granville/Graham Sydney (tie)
1966	Winnats Pass, Derbyshire	PD Greenhalgh	Paul Wildsmith	G.Sydney
1965	Dover's Hill	Granville Sydney	P.J.Graham (tie)	R.Martin (tie)
1964	Peaslows, Derbyshire	Eric Wilson	Ernie Lightfoot	Granville Sydney
1963	Winnats Pass	Granville Sydney	P.J.Graham	R.Foster
1962	Nick O' Pendle, Lancashire	Peter Graham	R.Foster	D.Millar
1961	Yorkshire Hill, Caint	Peter Graham	R.Foster	D.A.Patten
1960	Saintbury, Gloucestershire	Eric Wilson	P.J.Graham	R.Foster
1959	Winnats Pass, Derbyshire	Gordon Rhodes	R.Foster	Peter Graham
1958	Monk's Lane, Bathford	Peter Graham	Eric Wilson	Bill Holmes
1957	Winnats Pass, Derbyshire	Eric Wilson	Arthur Pursey	Bill Holmes
1956	Saintbury, Gloucestershire	Les Ingman	Eric Wilson	W Bradley
1955	Holly Lane, Derbyshire	Eric Wilson	Roy Keighley	Arthur Pursey
1954	Holme Moss	Les Ingman	Eric Wilson	W Bradley
1953	Winnats Pass, Derbyshire	Roy Keighley	Ronnie Stringwell	PS Boyd
1952	Mow Cop, Staffordshire	Brian Robinson	Jim Pentecost	Roy Keighley
1951	Saintbury, Gloucestershire	Ronnie Stringwell	Brian Robinson	R Procter
1950	Barber's Hill, Llangollen	Ronnie Stringwell	Bob Maitland	Brian Robinson
1949	Winnats Pass, Derbyshire	Bob Maitland	WE Penvose	Vic Clark
1948	Landsdowne Lane at Weston near Bath	Vic Clark	Dick Woore	Bernard King
1947	Winnats Pass, Derbyshire	Vic Clark	Bob Maitland	Harold Worthen
1946	Holly Lane, Ambergate	Vic Clark	Bob Maitland	Laurie Dodd
1945	Peaslows Hill, Chapel en le Frith	Bob Maitland	Vin Taylor	JD Spink
1944	Brasted, Kent	Frank Worthen	Vic Clark	Vin Taylor

*The fastest time in 2026 was actually set by Junior Ezra Bateman.

== Women Results ==
Results for the women's national hill climb only go back as far as 1998, as this is the year they competed in their own category. Prior to 1998 women and men competed in the same category.

Year	Hill	Gold	Silver	Bronze
2026	Porlock Toll Road, (Porlock), Somerset	Illi Gardner	Maria Holdcroft	Karolina Zydelyte
2025	Bank Road, (Matlock), Derbyshire	Rachel Galler	Illi Gardner	Madeleine Heywood
2024	Dipton Mill Road, Hexham, Northumberland	Illi Gardner	Lizi Brooke	Abi Plowman
2023	The Struggle, (Kirkstone Road), Cumbria	Illi Gardner	Lizi Brooke	Abi Plowman
2022	The Old Shoe, Horseshoe Pass, Denbighshire	Illi Gardner	Mary Wilkinson	Bithja Jones
2021	Winnats Pass, Derbyshire	Bithja Jones	Mary Wilkinson	Rebecca Richardson
2020	Streatley Hill, Berkshire	Bithja Jones	Mary Wilkinson	Monica Greenwood
2019	Haytor Vale, Devon	Hayley Simmonds	Joscelin Lowden	Rebecca Richardson
2018	Pea Royd Lane, Stocksbridge	Fiona Burnie	Mary Wilkinson	Kate Mactear
2017	Hedley Hill, Northumberland	Joscelin Lowden	Mary Wilkinson	Hayley Simmonds
2016	Bank Road, Matlock, Derbyshire	Lou Bates	Becky Lewis	Joanne Clay
2015	Jackson Bridge, Holmfirth, West Yorkshire	Maryka Sennema	Hayley Simmonds	Lou Bates
2014	Pea Royd Lane, Stocksbridge, Sheffield, South Yorkshire	Maryka Sennema	Lou Collins	Lynn Hamel
2013	The Stang, Yorkshire	Maryka Sennema	Lynn Hamel	Angela Hibbs
2012	The Rake, Ramsbottom	Lynn Hamel	Joanna Clay	Ann Bowditch
2011	Long Hill, Buxton, Derbyshire	Lynn Hamel	Rebecca Slack	Sarah Byrne
2010	Dover's Hill, Gloucestershire	Lynn Hamel	Chrissy Radon	Michelle King
2009	Pea Royd Lane, Stocksbridge, Sheffield, South Yorkshire	Anna Fischer	Lynn Hamel	Claire Cook
2008	Bank Road, Matlock	Lynn Hamel	Claire Thomas	Marianne Britten
2007	Cheddar Gorge, Somerset	Caroline Kloiber	Lynn Hamel	Ann Bowditch
2006	Peak Hill, Sidmouth, Devon	Ann Bowditch	Lynn Hanel	Jane Kilmartin
2005	The Rake, Ramsbottom	Ann Bowditch	Hannah Bussey	Jane Morris
2004	Winter's Gibbet, Elsdon, Northumberland	Ann Bowditch	Catherine Hare	Lynn Hamel
2003	Halifax Lane, Luddenden	Ruth Dorrington	Marianne Hesketh	
2002	Cat and Fiddle, Cheshire	Ann Wooldridge		
2001	Y Bwlch, Ruthin	Susan Massey		
2000	West Close Hill, Rodney Stoke, Somerset	Tracey Maund		
1999	The Rake, Ramsbottom	Helen Dawson		
1998	Dover's Hill, Weston sub Edge, Gloucestershire	Nicole Cooke	Jill Reames	Tracey Maund

== Youth and Junior Results ==
There have not always been separate results for youth and juniors published, so information is patchy. The first time the championship officially separated the junior title from the senior was 2007.

Year	Hill	Winner (Open)	Team	Winner (F)	Team
2026	Porlock Toll Road	Ezra Bateman*	Decathlon CMA CGM Juniors	Mabli Phillips	Shibden CC
2025	Bank Road	Harry Hudson	Harrogate Nova CC	Ruby Isaac	Tofauti Everyone Active
2024	Dipton Mill Rd	Harry Hudson	Harrogate Nova CC	Maia Howell	Matlock CC
2023	The Struggle	Harry Hudson	Matlock CC	Ruby Isaac	Welland Valley CC
2022	The Old Shoe	Tomos Pattinson	Halesowen A&CC	?	?
2021	Winnats Pass	Tomos Pattinson	Sannah Zaman	?	?
2007	Cheddar Gorge, Somerset	Adam Pinder	Blackburn and District CTC	?	?

*In 2026, Ezra Bateman set the fastest time of the day actually beating the Open winner, the first time a Junior has done so.

== Para-Cyclist Results ==
The first time a separate para category appeared in the Championships was in 2025, on Bank Road in Matlock.

Year	Hill	Winner (F)	Team	Winner (Open)	Team
2026	Porlock Toll Road	-	-	Christopher Scott	Le Col Race Team
2025	Bank Road	Morgan Newberry	Loughborough Students Cycling Club	Christopher Scott	Le Col Race Team
