= Tejvan Pettinger =

British cyclist

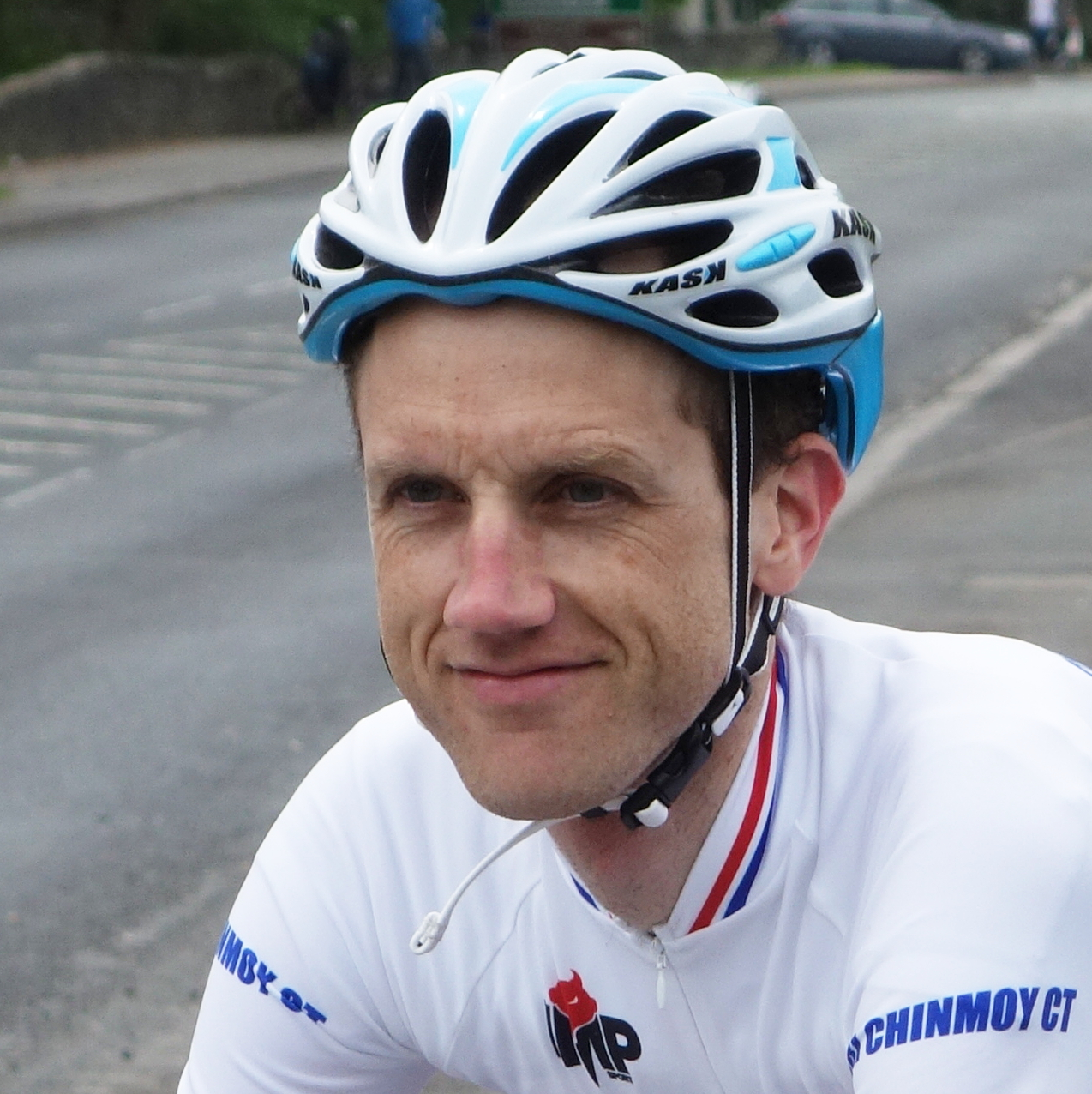
Shap hill climb 2014

Richard John Pettinger (born 11 November 1976), better known as Tejvan Pettinger, is a British cyclist successful in UK hill-climbs and time trials. He works as an economics teacher and lives in Oxford.

== Biography ==
Pettinger was born in Runnymede, Surrey, but spent most of his time growing up in Menston, West Yorkshire. When he was young he did some cycling and cross-country running. He started cycling aged 14, riding for Otley CC. He went to Bradford Grammar School and then Lady Margaret Hall, Oxford where he read PPE.

Pettinger has been a student of the spiritual master Sri Chinmoy since 1999. He adopted the name Tejvan from Sri Chinmoy (a Sanskrit word representing dynamism, enthusiasm and self-giving).

Pettinger was a member of the Oxford University CC during the late 1990s. After an illness he started running, but then injured his knee. In 2003, he resumed cycling and started racing in 2004.

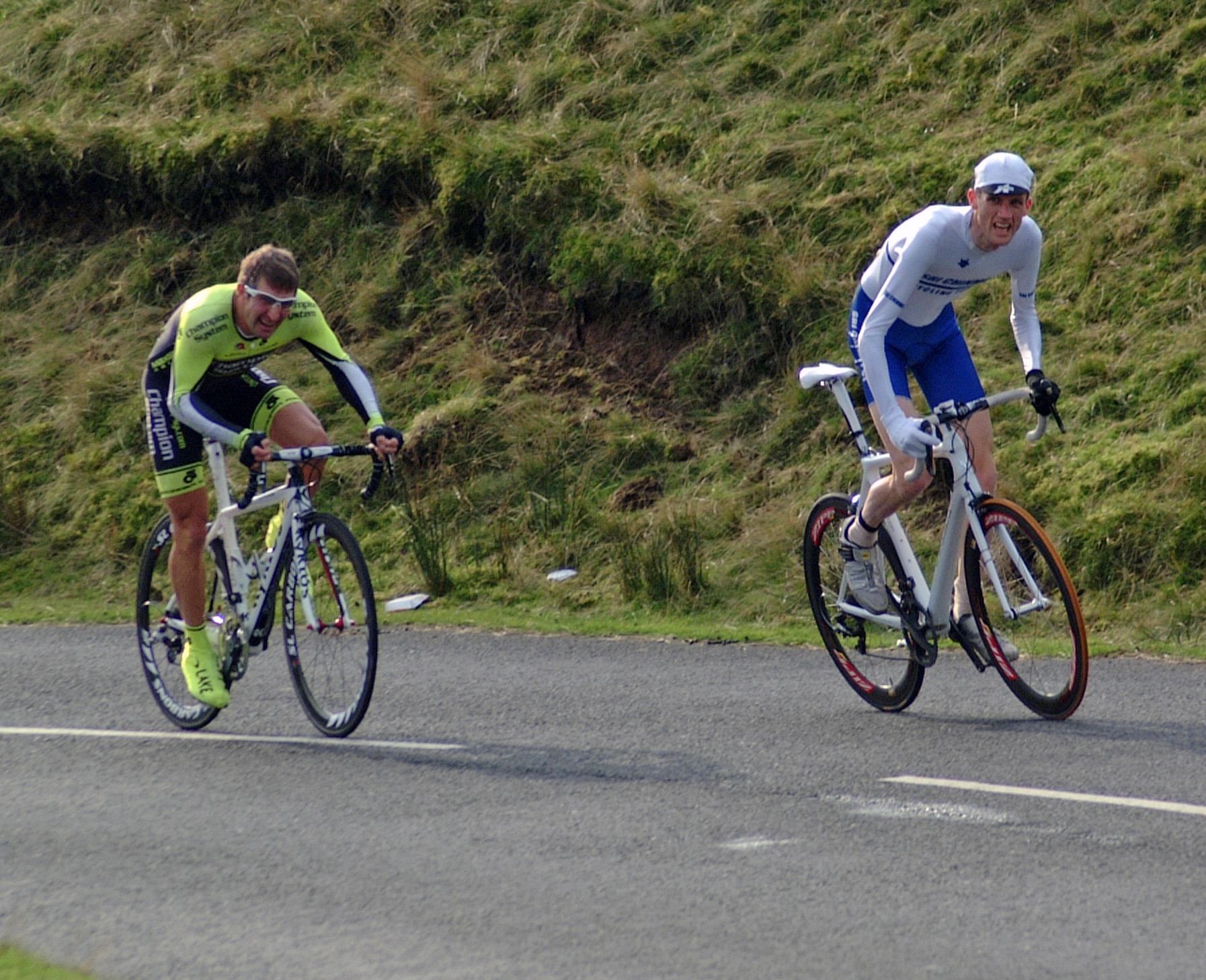
Nick O Pendle Hill Climb

== Races and results ==
- 2013 British National Hill Climb Championships, 1st
- 2014 UK national 100 mile time trial championship, 3rd

== Bibliography ==
- Pettinger: Happiness Will Follow You (2011), ISBN 978-8866061021
- Pettinger: Cracking Economics Octopus Press (2016), ISBN 978-1844039319
- Pettinger: What Would Keynes Do? Octopus Press (2017), ISBN 978-1844039807
- Pettinger: Economics Without the Boring Bits (2021), ISBN 978-1787396128
