= Richard Wardlaw =

British Army officer

Lieutenant General Richard Wardlaw CB OBE
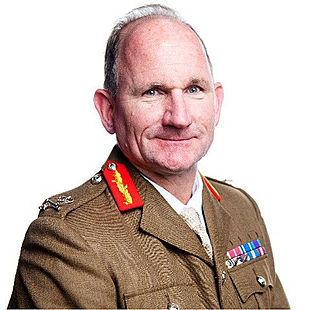
- Alma mater: University of Nottingham; Cranfield University; University of Oxford
- Military career
- Allegiance: United Kingdom
- Branch: British Army
- Service years: 1986–2024
- Rank: Lieutenant General
- Unit: Royal Engineers
- Commands: Chief of Defence Logistics and Support; 36 Engineer Regiment
- Conflicts: Operation Banner; Operation Grapple; Iraq War; War in Afghanistan
- Awards: Companion of the Order of the Bath; Officer of the Order of the British Empire; Queen's Commendation for Valuable Service

Lieutenant General Richard Wardlaw, CB, OBE is a retired senior British Army officer, who served as the Chief of Defence Logistics and Support within Strategic Command from 2019 to 2023.

== Military career ==
Wardlaw was first commissioned as a second lieutenant (on probation) in 1986, on a Short Service Limited Commission—a scheme that commissioned prospective officers for a gap year before progressing on to university—within the Royal Engineers. The subsequent year, he joined the University Officers' Training Corps while studying for a Bachelor of Engineering in Production Engineering at the University of Nottingham, commissioning once more as a second lieutenant (on probation) in 1988. After attending the Royal Military Academy Sandhurst, he was confirmed as a second lieutenant in 1991, returning to the Royal Engineers. After promotion to lieutenant in 1991, Wardlaw joined the Queen's Gurkha Engineers as a troop commander, serving in Hong Kong and Brunei. Being promoted to captain in 1995, and progressing onto major and lieutenant colonel, Wardlaw continued to serve with the Queen's Gurkha Engineers as a squadron second-in-command, squadron commander of 20 Field Squadron, and finally as the commanding officer of 36 Engineer Regiment and commandant of the Queen's Gurkha Engineers. Upon promotion to colonel in 2009 (and later brigadier), and his transfer to the General Staff, Wardlaw served as the Assistant Director of Manning (Plans and Policy), Chief Engineer of the Allied Rapid Reaction Corps and Director of Plans (Army). Promotion to major general came in 2015, along with the roles of Chief of Staff of the Allied Rapid Reaction Corps and Director of Army Basing and Infrastructure, before Wardlaw was appointed as the Chief of Defence Logistics and Support along with promotion to lieutenant general in 2019. He was succeeded in this position in late 2023, and retired from the army on 31 January 2024.

Upon retiring from the army, Wardlaw briefly served as Head of Logistics at the Hinkley Point C nuclear power station, before stepping into a number advisory roles within the energy sector. He is also an Associate Fellow at the Saïd Business School, and Chairman of the Centre for Economic Security.

Wardlaw previously served as the Colonel of the Queen's Gurkha Engineers from 2016 to 2020, and was one of the 12 Colonel Commandants of the Royal Engineers from 2015 to 2020. He was Colonel Commandant of the Brigade of Gurkhas from 2020 to 2024, and also served as the Chairman of The Gurkha Welfare Trust, Chairman of the Royal Engineers Officers' Widows Society, and a Trustee of the Royal Engineer Yacht Club.

Wardlaw was appointed an Officer of the Order of the British Empire (OBE) in the 2012 Birthday Honours. In the 2024 King's Birthday Honours, he was appointed Companion of the Order of the Bath (CB).

== Personal life ==
Wardlaw is married to Judith and has two daughters.

Military offices
New title	Chief of Defence Logistics and Support; 2019–2023	Succeeded by Vice Admiral Andrew Kyte
