= Stuart Dangerfield =

English cyclist

Personal information
- Full name: Stuart Dangerfield
- Nickname: Dangermouse
- Born: 17 September 1971 (age 55) Willenhall, England
- Height: 1.73 m (5 ft 8 in)
- Weight: 64 kg (141 lb; 10.1 st)

Cycling career
- Sport: Cycling
- Discipline: Road
- Role: Rider
- Rider type: Time triallist

Amateur teams
- 1984-: Wolverhampton Wheelers
- 1992-1995: Leo RC
- 1996: Parker International RT

Professional teams
- 1997: Wheelbase CC
- 1998: Fastrack RT
- 1999: Bio RT-MDT
- 2000-2003: Camel Valley CC
- 2004-2006: scienceinsport.com

Major wins
- British National Time Trial Champion (1995, 1996, 1998, 2001, 2003, 2005) British National Hill Climb Champion (1992, 1993, 1995, 1996, 1997)

Stuart Dangerfield (born 17 September 1971, and from Willenhall in Staffordshire, now the West Midlands) is an English retired racing cyclist who was prominent in British individual time trial events during the 1990s and early 21st century. He was the British national time trial champion six times, jointly holding the record for most wins with Alex Dowsett.

Dangerfield won his first RTTC national time trial championship in 1992 in the hill-climb event - a victory he repeated in 1993, 1995, 1996 and 1997. In 1997, he was also a 25-mile (40 km) time trial champion; he also won the event four consecutive times from 2000 to 2003. He won his first national 10-mile (16 km) championship in 2001, with repeat victories in 2003 and 2004. In 2001 he broke 10 miles (16 km) competition record with a time of 18'19" (32.76 mph), knocking eight seconds off the previous record, set by Graeme Obree in 1993.

At world championship level, he has represented Great Britain in the individual time trial event at Holland 1998, Brittany 2000, Portugal 2001 and Belgium 2002. He also represented England at the Commonwealth Games in Canada 1994, Malaysia 1998 and Manchester 2002.

Dangerfield was little known outside club cycling circles in Britain, having grown up in the shadow of firstly Chris Boardman and then David Millar. However, Millar's admission to using the illegal drug EPO and consequent expulsion from the Great Britain squad for the 2004 Summer Olympics meant that Dangerfield was called up into the Olympic squad to race the time trial. An injury to GB cyclist Jeremy Hunt also saw Dangerfield entered into the men's road race. Dangerfield finished 30th in the time trial, but did not finish the road race.

At the Commonwealth Games in 2002 Dangerfield was disqualified for riding in the slipstream of a rider who had caught and passed him.

Dangerfield retired from time trialling competition in 2009.

== Palmares ==
1990
3rd British National Hill Climb Championships
1991
3rd British National Hill Climb Championships
1992
1st British National Hill Climb Championships
1993
1st British National Hill Climb Championships
1994
1st North Road Hardriders Time Trial
2nd British National Hill Climb Championships
7th Commonwealth Games
1995
1st British National Time Trial Championships
1st British National Hill Climb Championships
1996
1st British National Time Trial Championships
1st British National Hill Climb Championships
2nd Bol Isle of Man
1997
1st British National Hill Climb Championships
2nd British National Time Trial Championships
1998
1st British National Time Trial Championships
6th Commonwealth Games
1999
1st Stage 4 Tour de Saudi Arabia
3rd British National Time Trial Championships
2000
1st Isle of Man Mountain Time Trial
1st Joseph Sunde Memorial
2001
1st British National Time Trial Championships
1st Isle of Man Mountain Time Trial
2002
3rd British National Time Trial Championships
2003
1st British National Time Trial Championships
2nd Bol Isle of Man
2005
1st British National Time Trial Championships
2nd Joseph Sunde Memorial
2006
4th British National Time Trial Championships
6th Commonwealth Games
