= Andrew Kyte =

Royal Navy Vice-Admiral (born 1966)

Vice Admiral Sir Andrew Kyte KBE CB
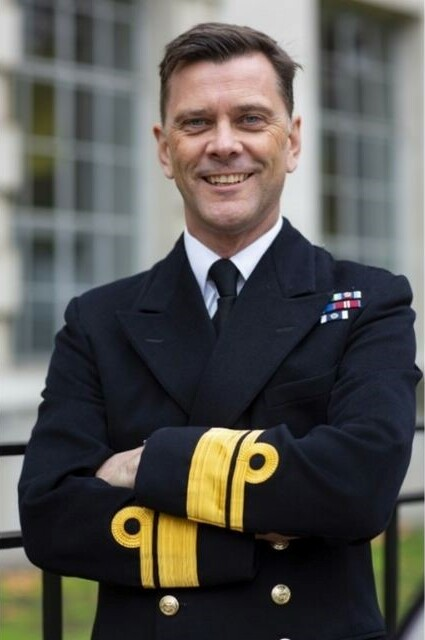
- Rear Admiral Kyte
- Born: 1966 (age 59–60)
- Military career
- Allegiance: United Kingdom
- Branch: Royal Navy
- Service years: 1987–present
- Rank: Vice Admiral
- Service number: C034224U
- Commands: Chief of Defence Logistics and Support
- Awards: Knight Commander of the Order of the British Empire; Companion of the Order of the Bath

Vice-Admiral Sir Andrew Jeffery Kyte, KBE, CB (born 1966) is a senior Royal Navy officer. From September 2023 to November 2026, he served as Chief of Defence Logistics and Support at Strategic Command.

== Naval career ==
He joined the Royal Navy in 1987 as a logistics officer. He served as Chief Naval Logistics Officer and Assistant Chief of the Defence Staff (Logistic Operations) from 2018 to 2022 and became Chief of Defence Logistics and Support at Strategic Command in September 2023. He was succeeded in that role in November 2026 by Lieutenant General Phil Prosser.

Kyte was appointed Companion of the Order of the Bath (CB) in the 2021 New Year Honours and appointed a Knight Commander of the Order of the British Empire (KBE) in the 2026 Birthday Honours.

Military offices
Preceded by Lieutenant General Richard Wardlaw	Chief of Defence Logistics and Support; 2023 to 2026	Succeeded by Lieutenant General Phil Prosser
