= Ronan McLaughlin =

Irish cyclist (born 1987)

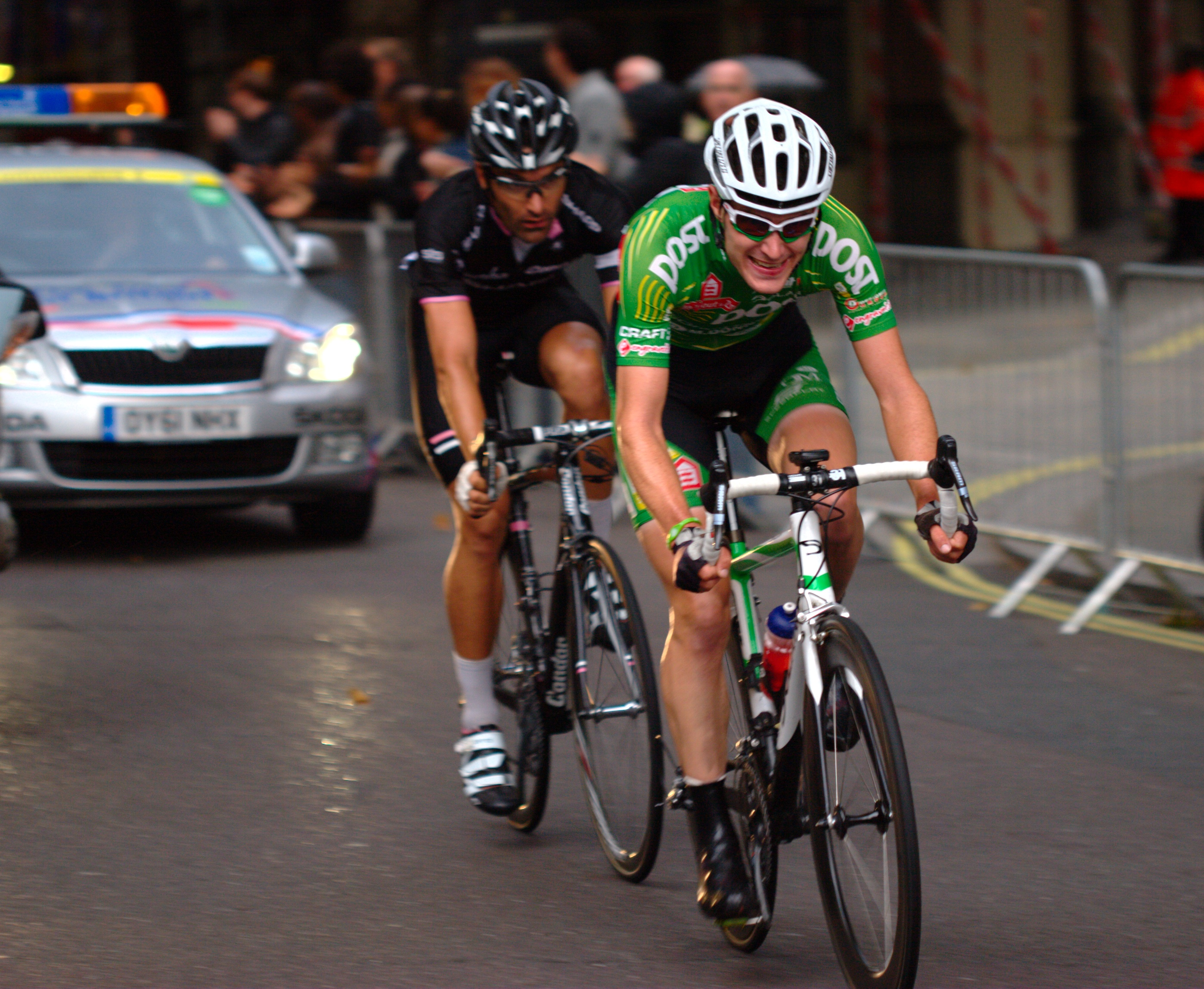
- McLaughlin (front) in 2011

Personal information
- Born: 11 March 1987 (age 39) Muff, County Donegal, Ireland

Cycling career
- Sport: Cycling
- Current team: Dan Morrissey–MIG.ie–Pactimo
- Discipline: Road
- Role: Rider

Amateur teams
- 2014: Inishowen Gateway Hotel
- 2015: Team Aquablue
- 2015: Team Asea
- 2016: Foyle CC
- 2017: Aqua Blue Academy
- 2018: Viner–Caremark–Pactimo Cycling Team
- 2019–: Dan Morrissey–MIG.ie–Pactimo

Professional team
- 2008–2013: An Post–M.Donnelly–Grant Thornton–Sean Kelly

Ronan McLaughlin (born 11 March 1987) is an Irish cyclist who currently rides for amateur team Dan Morrissey–MIG.ie–Pactimo. He also rode for UCI Continental team An Post–Chain Reaction from 2008 until 2013, and competed in the road race at the 2012 UCI Road World Championships.

Ronan holds the current fastest known time for Everesting. He also holds the record for fastest time cycling from Mizen Head to Malin Head.

After racing career has worked as a tech editor at online cycling publications Cyclingtips and Escape Collective.

== Major results ==
2005
2nd Road race, National Junior Road Championships
2008
3rd Time trial, National Under-23 Road Championships
2009
2nd Road race, National Under-23 Road Championships
2010
4th Overall Mi-Août en Bretagne
8th Circuit de Wallonie
2013
5th Road race, National Road Championships
8th Kattekoers
8th Beverbeek Classic
2015
2nd Overall Tour of the North
2017
3rd Overall Rás Mumhan
2018
1st Shay Elliott Memorial Race
1st Stage 2 Tour of Ulster
2019
1st Shay Elliott Memorial Race
2021
Everesting World Record 6 hrs 40 minutes
