= Everesting =

Cycling activity

Everesting is an activity in which cyclists or runners ascend and descend a given hill multiple times, in order to have cumulatively climbed 8,848 metres (29,029 ft) (the elevation of Mount Everest).

The first event described as "Everesting" was by George Mallory, grandson of George Mallory, who disappeared on Everest in 1924. The younger Mallory ascended Mount Donna Buang in 1994, having ridden eight "laps" of the 1,069-metre hill. The format and rules were cemented by Andy van Bergen, inspired by the story of Mallory's effort. In the first official group effort, van Bergen organized 65 riders, 40 of whom finished the Everesting attempt.

== Everesting ==
George Mallory's Everesting attempt in 1994 was written up into an article in 2012, which first prompted others to take on this challenge. The widespread growth of GPS technology and social media - particularly Strava and Zwift - has been vital in allowing riders to accurately measure distance, elevation and height gain, while also sharing information about their ride. The writer and cyclist Andy van Bergen has been key to popularizing the idea through the Hells 500 group, which had been created as a social group to allow its members to complete and share cycling challenges. Hells 500 created the Everesting website, which established the parameters of the challenge, and started documenting attempts.

Everesting has grown among both amateur cyclists as a challenging but achievable goal, and among professionals or retired professionals who have sought to break Everesting time records. It rose further in popularity during 2020 when the COVID-19 pandemic resulted in cancelled races, and lockdowns prevented cycling club rides or travel for cycling challenges. This forced riders to seek new challenges, that could be completed on local roads, or on virtual platforms (sometimes called vEveresting). During 2020, the challenge grew beyond cycling into running.

A number of related challenges have spun-off from the original Everesting challenge. Riders have attempted double, triple or even quadruple Everests. The Everesting website has multiple suggestions for variants of the challenge, including an Everesting 10k challenge - that is, to continue past the 8,848 metres (29,029 ft) of Everest to reach a cumulative height of 10,000 metres (33,000 ft) - as a stretch goal, or a Half-Everest as an easier target.

== Parameters ==
Everesting is a personal challenge, and as such there is no official sanctioning body: the only criterion is that 8,848 metres (29,029 ft) of climbing is completed in a single ride or run. To be accepted as a ride on the Everesting website, an attempt must, among other things:

- be recorded on Strava or Zwift;
- be timed as one effort, with any breaks for food or rest included in the attempt's elapsed time;
- be completed by going up and down one route of ascent only, avoiding loops;
- be continuous, with athletes cycling or running down the slope as well as up it (e.g., they cannot be taken by car down the slope);
- be completed using a bike that does not have a motor.

Everesting recognise different rules for variants of the challenge, some of which incorporate sleeping or longer rest breaks to ensure rider safety.

== Fastest known times ==
=== Women ===
Rank	Date	Rider		Age (in years)	Time	Location	Distance		Average gradient	Notes
Rank	Date	Name	Pro-team	Age (in years)	Time	Location	km	mi	Average gradient	Notes
1	July 23, 2022	(United Kingdom) Illi Gardner		22	8:03:29	Crowcombe, Somerset, England	106	66	17.2%	
2	August 14, 2021	(United Kingdom) Illi Gardner	CAMS–Basso	21	8:33:47	Bwlch y Groes, Wales	107.5	66.8	17.4%	
3	July 8, 2020	(United Kingdom) Emma Pooley	retired	37	8:53:00	Haggenegg, Schwyz, Switzerland	130	81	13%	
4	June 4, 2020	(United Kingdom) Hannah Rhodes			9:08:00	Kirkstone Pass, Cumbria, England	163	101	10.9%	
5	May 31, 2020	(United States) Lauren De Crescenzo		29	9:57:00	Hogpen Gap, Blairsville, Georgia, United States	179	111	9.83%	
6	May 23, 2020	(United States) Katie Hall	Boels–Dolmans	33	10:01:00	Bonny Doon, Davenport, California, United States	197	122	8.88%	
7	August 19, 2018	(United Kingdom) Alice Thompson		24	12:32:00	Naish Hill, Clapton-in-Gordano, Somerset, England	121	75	14.6%	
8	July 31, 2017	(Canada) Alisa MacDonald		37	12:37:00	Silvertip, Canmore, Alberta, Canada	188	117	10.0%	

=== Men ===
Rank	Date	Rider		Age (in years)	Time	Location	Distance		Average gradient	Notes
Rank	Date	Name	Pro-team	Age (in years)	Time	Location	km	mi	Average gradient	Notes
1	March 23, 2021	(Republic of Ireland) Ronan McLaughlin		34	6:40.54	Mamore Gap, County Donegal, Ireland	123	76	14.2%	
2	October 3, 2020	(United States) Sean Gardner		26	6:59:38	Tanners Ridge Road, Stanley, Virginia, United States	116	72	15.5%	
3	October 12, 2020	(Australia) Nathan Earle	Team UKYO	33	7:10:10	The Lea, Tasmania, Australia	130	81	13.9%	
4	July 7, 2020	(Spain) Alberto Contador	retired	37	7:27:20	Silla del Rey, Castile and León, Spain	139	86	12.9%	
5	June 20, 2020	(Australia) Lachlan Morton	EF Pro Cycling	28	7:29:00	Rist Canyon, Bellvue, Colorado, United States	155	96	11.1%	
6	May 15, 2020	(United States) Keegan Swenson		26	7:40:00	Pine Canyon, Park City, Utah, United States	170	110	10.6%	
7	May 11, 2020	(United States) Phil Gaimon	retired	34	7:52:00	Mountaingate Drive, Los Angeles, California, United States	156	97	11.1%	

== Notable Everesting rides ==
- The first woman to everest was Sarah Hammond in February 2014, climbing Australia's Mount Buffalo eight times.
- Frank Garcia was the first to "virtually everest", riding Zwift's Watopia Wall 314 times in 2015.
- Pavel Paloncý (M) and Markéta Peggy Marvanová (F, both Czech) everested 14 times between April 19, 2021, and June 22, 2021.
- Benny JJ completed an everesting every month of 2016.
- Ben Soja was the first to Everest on a 2-gear-unicycle – Schlumpf-gear, 27,5", 150 mm cranks, daytime clipless pedals, during night platform pedals, riding up Mount Lowe in the San Gabriel Mountains of California ten times over twenty-three hours in March 2018. His record was beaten in 2024 by Mason Allen who did it in 21h 9m on University of Virginia campus.
- In August 2018 Zhuangchen “JJ” Zhou became the first rider to everest on Mount Everest, completing 8,850 metres (29,035 ft) of climbing over 177 laps of the 1 kilometre (0.62 mi) climb to Everest Base Camp in Tibet, China.
- From June 22, 2024, until June 30, 2024, Arend VandenBroucke was the first one to realize a decuple everesting (10X) on Cresta del Gallo, Murcia (Spain). He rode 2432 km in 187 hours with an elevation of 88954m.
- In March 2017 Charlie Rentoul became the first person to everest the "tallest" mountain in the world. This required just two ascents and descents of the 89 km long climb of the dormant volcano Mauna Kea in Hawaii.
- In July 2023 Karl Plötzl was the first person to achieve an 8-times Everest on bike. He was cycling for 7 days continuously, spending a total of 116 hours on his bike to break the previous world record of 7 Everests by going up 70,800m over a distance of 1,781 km on a small hill in Austria.
