= Col de Jambaz =

col de Jambaz
- Jambaz Pass
- Location within France
- Elevation: 1,027 metres (3,369 ft)

Third Approach
- Location: Haute-Savoie, France
- Range: Chablais Alps
- Coordinates: 46°14′05″N 6°31′13″E

The Col de Jambaz is a mountain pass in the Chablais Alps in the Haute-Savoie department of France. It lies at the entrance to the province of Faucigny, in the Bellevaux commune, near the village of Jambaz, at an elevation of 1,027 metres (3,369 ft).
