= Oxford University Cycling Club =

Cycling club of the University of Oxford

- Sport: Cycling
- Founded: 1873 (as DBBC)
- League: British Universities' Cycling Union (BUCU)
- Location: Oxford, Oxfordshire, England
- Website: www.oxforduniversitycc.co.uk

Oxford University Cycling Club (O.U.C.C.) is a cycling club for students and associated members of the University of Oxford. Via earlier incarnations, the Dark Blue Bicycle Club (D.B.B.C.) and the Oxford University Bicycle Club (O.U.Bi.C.), it has a history reaching back to the very origins of club and competitive cycling.

Cycling is a discretionary full blue sport at Oxford with half blues awarded to the three riders comprising the fastest Oxford team in the Varsity Match against Cambridge, as well as three full blues awarded at the captain's discretion.

== History ==
=== Early years ===
The history of club cycling at the University of Oxford, is extremely long and distinguished, but not continuous. The club has existed under three different names, and there have been periods during which no functioning club has been at all apparent. The Dark Blue Bicycle Club (taking its name from the identifying sporting colour of the university, known otherwise as Oxford Blue) was founded in 1873. Its stated objects were "the holding of meets and races, the arrangement of tours, and generally to facilitate and encourage bicycling in the University". Those local aims were soon to have national application as the club became centrally involved in forming and shaping the bodies that would organize competitive and recreational cycling in England and Wales in the last quarter of the nineteenth century. It was one of the eight clubs that met in Westminster on 7 September 1875 to establish an Amateur Championship. Founder members of the D.B.B.C. included the three who would represent Oxford in the first cycling Varsity match, which was held in 1874: Edgar Wing (Worcester Coll.), Charles Penrose (Oriel Coll.), and Charles F. Read (Queen's Coll.) and, according to his own recollection, Edmund Denniss (Hertford Coll.). Rivalry between the two university clubs soon extended to the Hour Record, being first set and then bettered by their riders three times between 1876 and 1879, the two latter by Dark Blues, Weir and Christie.

In May 1881, the club changed its name to the Oxford University Bicycle Club, abbreviated to O.U.Bi.C.; the "i" distinguishing it from the Oxford University Boat Club. In Lent Term, 1882, the membership of the club stood at 44. The club continued as O.U.Bi.C. until it fell dormant in 1903. Since its inauguration, the Varsity match had been contested every year apart from 1885 (not held) and 1895 (abandoned), while over that period the format of the competition had varied considerably, from a road race between the two university towns to a track race meet.

=== Modern era ===
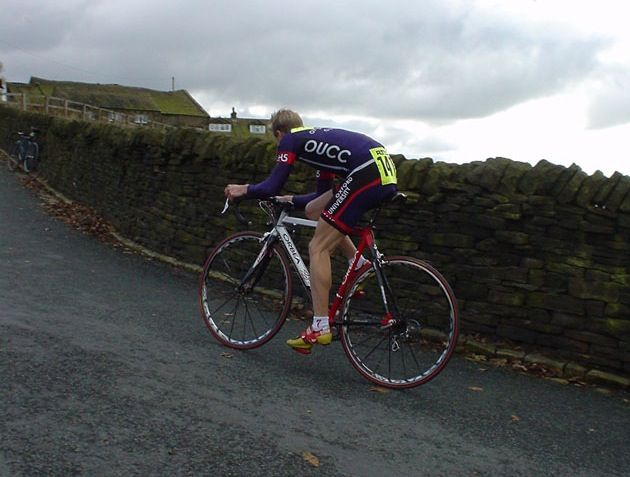
OUCC rider Danny Axford on his way to a 4th BUSA Hillclimb victory, at Curbar Gap, Derbyshire

In early 1939, several British regional newspapers announced, via a syndicated article, that: "After an interval of 37 years organised cycling has been revived at Oxford University. An Oxford University Cycling Club has been formed". it was reported that members of the club had participated in an initial club ride on 29 January. The hope was expressed that Cambridge would follow suit, and that the Varsity races would soon resume. It did not, though, prove possible to organize a challenge race prior to the outbreak of World War II, mobilization for which stripped Oxford (and Cambridge) of most of its students and led to the disappearance of the so-recently reconstituted club.

During the 1950/51 academic year a small club was once again active, though mainly for the purposes of recreational cycling. In the following year it acquired a handful of keen racing members, among them the ebullient Malcolm Prince (Jesus Coll.) who, with Brian Stackhouse (University Coll.) cycled to London to represent the club at the inaugural meeting of the British Universities' Cycling Union (BUCU). In 1953, the club organized the BUCU 25-mile T.T. championship and later in the same year it competed against the Cambridge University Cycle Racing Club (now CUCC) in a "3-up" team time trial on a "neutral" course near Whipsnade. Cambridge "rode over" to win, after the Oxford team suffered mechanical failure. The club at this time had a single female member, Margaret Wilkinson (Lady Margaret Hall), while J. B. Leishman (St. John's Coll.), the translator of the poems of Rilke, was persuaded to serve as the obligatory Senior Member.

After another brief hiatus, the club was restarted in Michaelmas Term 1957 by Peter Hopkins (Exeter Coll.), Jim Thompson and Bill Speck (both Queen's Coll.), and a formal constitution was drawn up and approved by a large, new membership. It has enjoyed continuous unbroken existence ever since. The club was affiliated (for road racing) to the British League of Racing Cyclists and (for time trials) to the Road Time Trials Council. The club gained its first female members at this time. The first woman to join was Anne Sims (St. Anne's Coll.) in October 1957, with others soon following. Sunday club-runs became well supported and separate training rides were established. Touring immediately flourished within the club, co-existing happily with the racing imperative, and the first touring weekend took place during the Christmas vacation of 1957–58. Following a challenge from Cambridge, who had heard of the OUCC.'s revival, the first Varsity Match of the current series was held on the H23 course (Kidlington) on 5 June 1958; the contest being for a Varsity Shield, to be retained by the winning club until the next encounter. The only non-University, associate members allowed by the Proctors were the three senior officers of Oxford City Road Club, in recognition of the city club's friendly disposition to University cyclists. Their President was official timekeeper for the early Varsity matches when the OUCC took its turn to organise the event.

In its modern form, the annual Varsity Match has normally taken the form of a 25-mile individual time trial held on open roads under Cycling Time Trials (formerly RTTC) rules. An exception was the 1976 contest, which was decided over 10 miles. There is no limit on the number of university entrants, nor is parity of numbers required. The teams are decided by the results, as the three fastest times set by riders of each club are added together, and the winner is deemed to be the club with the lower of the two aggregate times. A Women's Varsity Match was introduced as soon as there were enough racing members in each club to form teams. OUCC. hosts the event on its local roads in even years, and CUCC in odd years.

In the 1960s and 1970s, a much-diminished membership reflected the national decline in cycle sport and cycling in general. Fortunately for the survival of OUCC, a steady trickle of committed 'club' cyclists, who already belonged to their local clubs and had raced as juniors, passed through the university club. As well as maintaining, through several lean years, all the essential events in the club calendar, including the inter-college 'Cuppers' 10-miles time trial, the club promoted the 1962 UAU. 50-mile championship time trial, in which it won its first individual and team medals at British Universities level; only Roy Cromack, then riding for Sheffield University, denying Bill Fowler (Keble Coll.) the gold. The outstanding racing member of the mid-to-late '60s was Mark Carritt (Univ. Coll.), a typical OUCC. 'all-rounder', though very untypical in that he excelled at every form of cycling competition. Carritt took the Bucks-Oxon-Berks road race title twice, as well as the British Universities road race, while in time trials he was among the best British 12-hour riders of his day, and, at the 25-mile distance, was the first OUCC rider to break the hour, recording a time of 58 minutes and 4 seconds in the 1968 Varsity Match.

In the early-to-mid 1970s, the club developed an interest in very long-distance rides, which included far-ranging vacation tours. It was through their membership of OUCC that the highly successful tandem tricycle pairing of Stuart Jackson and Edwin Hargraves came together, which took multiple United Kingdom place-to-place records. By the end of the 1970s, the racing membership of the club had dwindled to six including the Senior Member, Rolls-Royce Junior Research Fellow Lawrence Daniels (Keble Coll.). Defiantly, it entered teams in "3-up" and "4-up" time-trial "Open" events. This was the nadir of the modern-era club, but the demises of 1902 and 1939 were not to be repeated. The club began to grow, and in 1981, for the first time in its history, OUCC gained sponsorship. This came from Competition Cycles of Cricklewood, London, whose proprietor, Colin Freud (Christ Church Coll.), was a former member. Evidence of resurgence came in the windswept Varsity Match of 1982 in which six Oxford riders (also six Cambridge riders), riding the un-aerodynamic, steel bicycles of the era, all broke the hour for the 25-mile distance.

During the 1980s, as the club found renewed strength and increased in numbers, OUCC enjoyed success over its Varsity rival Cambridge (CUCC) in the annual Varsity Match. The 25-mile invidivual time trial was held in May, usually the week after the boat race, and incorporated into the BSSF National 25-mile Championship. Oxford's most successful rider during this period was Jonathan Atkinson who gained a Half-Blue all of his 7 appearances from 1984 to 1991.

In the last decades of the century, a growing club membership and an improving gender ratio made possible a fuller club programme. The racing section embraced science-informed training methods, introduced in the early 1980s by research neurologist and club coach, Dr Eugene "Gene" Merrill. Performance testing and computer analysis was subsequently brought in by Dick Poole, the club's performance adviser of the mid-1980s. A fortuitous kerbside meeting in 2007 led to the club benefiting from the coaching services of former Giro d'Italia rider Flavio Zappi. The drive for competition success at Oxford, however, has never been at the expense of cycling for sheer enjoyment. While its Cambridge rival has always succeeded in focusing on the Varsity Match, OUCC (like the D.B.B.C. and O.U.Bi.C. before it) has a more wayward history. Writers have observed that the spirit of the Scholar Gypsy affects cycling at Oxford generally, attributing this partly to the nature of Oxfordshire's country lanes and the county's characteristic topography and scenery. The local woods now provide trails for one of the club's relatively recent accretions, the mountain biking section. Mountain biking, by virtue of ts popularity, has earned its own Varsity Match, held annually as a cross-country (XC) race, in which, like the traditional road time-trial event, the winning team is deemed to be that which finishes with the lowest aggregate time.

== Inter-university achievements ==
In 1983, the club returned to British Universities competition. In that year, it hosted the BUSF/BSSF. 50-mile championship and, a few weeks later, won the team category for the BUSF/BSSF 100-mile championship in South Lancashire. Since then, OUCC has been highly successful in competition, particularly in inter-university championships, gaining BUCS / BSSF titles in every type of road racing event; notable winning years being 1990 (Jonathan Atkinson: individual Hill-Climb), 1991 (S. Newington, D. Hulmes, S. Cryer: team Hill-Climb) and 1996 (Brenda Allen: Women's 10-miles T.T., 25-miles T.T., and Hill-Climb; Jim Henderson: Hill-Climb; Jim Henderson, Mark Einon, David Ryan: team Hill-Climb) and 1997 (Digby Symons: Best All-Rounder over 10/25/50/100-mile T.T. distances; Brenda Allen: Women's 100-miles T.T.; Jim Henderson, 50-miles T.T.). Jim Henderson was riding for OUCC when he won the first of his five National hill climb titles on Dover's Hill in 1998. 2000 proved to be an outstanding year for the women's team which that year won golds in the BUSA Hill Climb and the Cyclo-cross race, while achieving overall second place in the track championships. In 2015, Olivia Withers (L.M.H.), Imogen Kempton (Lincoln Coll.), and Tamara Davenne (Merton Coll.), of the newly formed women's racing squad, won the BUCS "3-up" team time trial, with Devenne also winning the BUCS circuit road race.

== Notable alumni ==
- Lewis Stroud (Pembroke Coll.), National (N.C.U.) 25-miles champion (tricycle), 1890, 1891; National 50-miles champion (bicycle), 1893; principal pacer of George Pilkington Mills when the latter won the inaugural (1891) Bordeaux-Paris race, recognized at the time as the "Championnat du Monde Officieux".
- H. B. Fitzherbert (Christ Church Coll.) and D. Thomson (New Coll.), World unpaced, amateur record holders, tandem, 1/2-mile and 1 Mile (standing start), Amateur Cycling Association (ACA) championships, Sheen, 1898.
- Paul Claxton (Wadham Coll.), expedition cyclist, 49th Parallel to 70° North (Vancouver - Prudhoe Bay/Arctic Ocean), road bicycle, 1984.
- Jonathan Atkinson (Corpus Christi College) rode the 20th and 23rd editions of the amateur Paris Roubaix International Road Race in 1986 and 1989, competed in 10 consecutive National Hill Climb Championships 1985-1994 including fastest fixed gear rider in 1989 (placed 7th overall), and was BSSF National Hill Climb Champion in 1989. He was awarded the first ever Cycling Full Blue in recognition of his achievements.
- Danny Axford (St Cross Coll.), 1st, Junior Tour of Wales 1993; 1st, British National Masters Championships (30-35 yrs), both road race and individual time trial, 2009.
- Tejvan Pettinger (Lady Margaret Hall) National Hill Climb champion, 2013.
