= 2008 Tour of Britain =

UCI Europe Tour
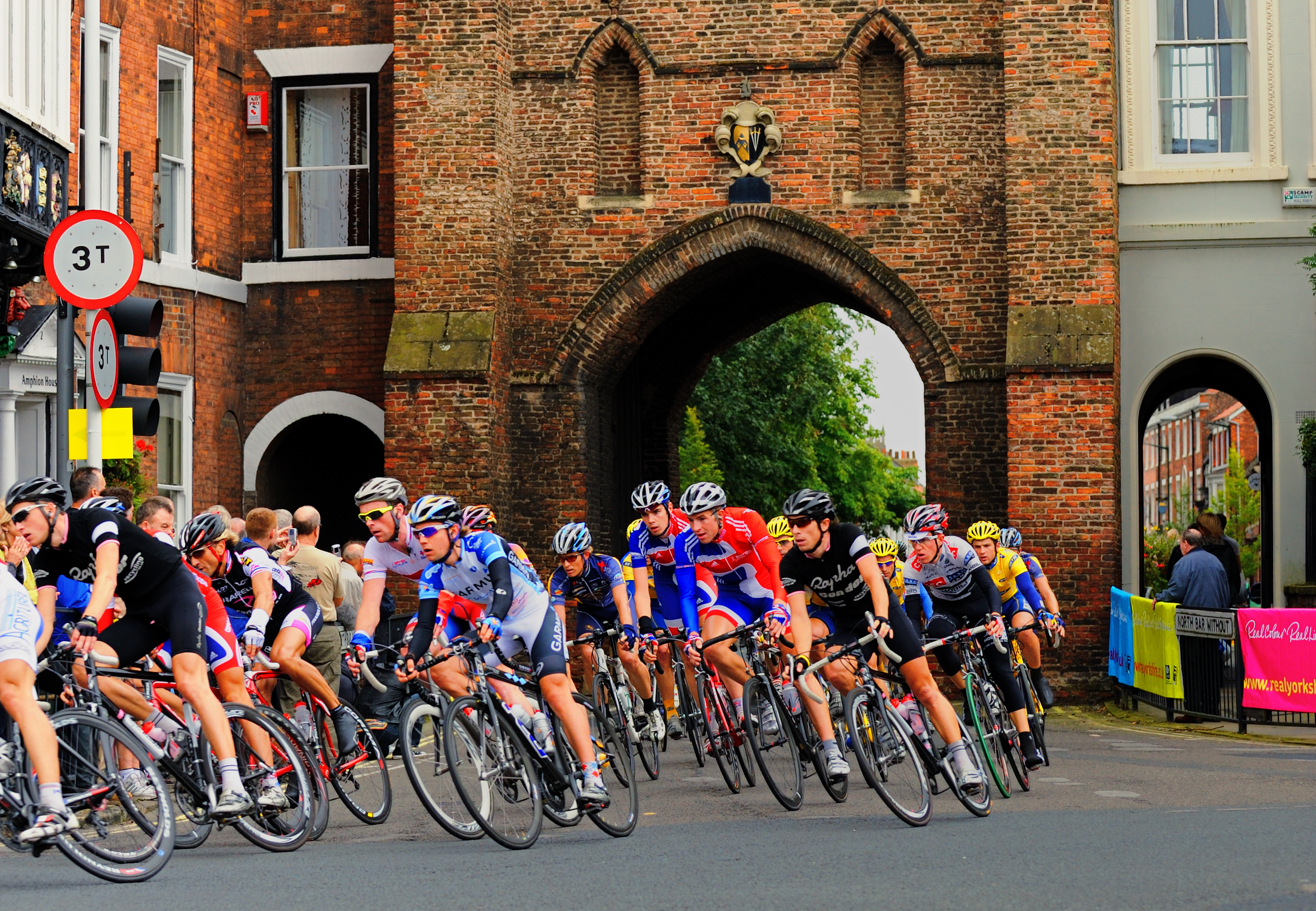
- Stage 5 of the 2008 Tour of Britain in Beverley

Race details
- Dates: 7–14 September 2008
- Stages: 8
- Distance: 730 mi (1,170 km)
- Winning time: 27h 21' 49"

Results
Jersey awarded to the overall winner	Winner	Geoffroy Lequatre (FRA)	(Agritubel)
	Second	Steve Cummings (GBR)	(Barloworld)
	Third	Ian Stannard (GBR)	(Great Britain)
Jersey awarded to the points classification winner	Points	Matthew Goss (AUS)	(CSC–Saxo Bank)
Jersey awarded to the mountains classification winner	Mountains	Danilo Di Luca (ITA)	(LPR Brakes–Ballan)
Jersey awarded to the sprints classification winner	Sprints	Edvald Boasson Hagen (NOR)	(Team Columbia)
	Team	Agritubel	

The 2008 Tour of Britain was a UCI 2.1 category race of eight stages from 7 September till 14 September 2008. The race was the fifth edition of the latest version of the Tour of Britain. It formed part of the 2007–08 UCI Europe Tour. The race begun with a circuit stage in London and ended in Liverpool.

The race was won by Geoffroy Lequatre of Agritubel, whilst both Alessandro Petacchi and Edvald Boasson Hagen won three stages.

== Participating teams ==
The 16 teams which participated in the race were:

UCI ProTour Teams

- SAX – CSC–Saxo Bank
- THR – Team Columbia

UCI Professional Continental Teams

- AGR – Agritubel
- BAR – Barloworld
- GRM – Garmin–Chipotle p/b H30
- LPR – LPR Brakes–Ballan
- TSV – Topsport Vlaanderen

UCI Continental Teams

- CTV – Pinarello – CandiTV
- MTN – Team MTN
- PRT – Palmeiras–Resort–Tavira
- PCA – Plowman Craven Cycling Team
- RCS – Rapha Condor–Recycling.co.uk
- RRC – Rock Racing
- SAI – SouthAustralia.com–AIS
- SKT – An Post–M.Donnelly–Grant Thornton–Sean Kelly

Other

- Great Britain

== Stages ==
=== Stage 1 ===
7 September 2008 – London to London, 86 km (53 mi)

Stage 1 results

	Cyclist	Team	Time
1	Alessandro Petacchi (ITA)	LPR Brakes–Ballan	1h 51' 54"
2	Rob Hayles (GBR)	Great Britain	s.t.
3	Magnus Bäckstedt (SWE)	Garmin–Chipotle p/b H30	s.t.
4	Dean Downing (GBR)	Rapha Condor–Recycling.co.uk	s.t.
5	Rahsaan Bahati (USA)	Rock Racing	s.t.
6	Roger Hammond (GBR)	Team Columbia	s.t.
7	Kristof Goddaert (BEL)	Topsport Vlaanderen	s.t.
8	Robbie Hunter (RSA)	Barloworld	s.t.
9	Zakkari Dempster (AUS)	SouthAustralia.com–AIS	s.t.
10	Jonathan Bellis (GBR)	CSC–Saxo Bank	s.t.

General Classification after Stage 1

	Cyclist	Team	Time
1	Alessandro Petacchi (ITA)	LPR Brakes–Ballan	1h 51' 44"
2	Rob Hayles (GBR)	Great Britain	+ 4"
3	Daryl Impey (RSA)	Barloworld	s.t.
4	Anders Lund (DEN)	CSC–Saxo Bank	s.t.
5	Magnus Bäckstedt (SWE)	Garmin–Chipotle p/b H30	+ 6"
6	Danilo Di Luca (ITA)	LPR Brakes–Ballan	+ 9"
7	Dean Downing (GBR)	Rapha Condor–Recycling.co.uk	+ 10"
8	Rahsaan Bahati (USA)	Rock Racing	s.t.
9	Roger Hammond (GBR)	Team Columbia	s.t.
10	Kristof Goddaert (BEL)	Topsport Vlaanderen	s.t.

=== Stage 2 ===
8 September 2008 – Milton Keynes to Newbury, 145 km (90 mi)

Stage 2 results

	Cyclist	Team	Time
1	Matthew Goss (AUS)	CSC–Saxo Bank	3h 25' 11"
2	Julian Dean (NZL)	Garmin–Chipotle p/b H30	s.t.
3	Christopher Sutton (AUS)	Garmin–Chipotle p/b H30	s.t.
4	Roger Hammond (GBR)	Team Columbia	s.t.
5	Greg Henderson (NZL)	Team Columbia	s.t.
6	Alessandro Petacchi (ITA)	LPR Brakes–Ballan	s.t.
7	Kristof Goddaert (BEL)	Topsport Vlaanderen	s.t.
8	Zakkari Dempster (AUS)	SouthAustralia.com–AIS	s.t.
9	Malcolm Elliott (GBR)	Pinarello – CandiTV	s.t.
10	Ben Swift (GBR)	Great Britain	s.t.

General Classification after Stage 2

	Cyclist	Team	Time
1	Alessandro Petacchi (ITA)	LPR Brakes–Ballan	5h 16' 55"
2	Matthew Goss (AUS)	CSC–Saxo Bank	s.t.
3	Danilo Di Luca (ITA)	LPR Brakes–Ballan	+ 2"
4	Rob Hayles (GBR)	Great Britain	+ 4"
5	Daryl Impey (RSA)	Barloworld	s.t.
6	Julian Dean (NZL)	Garmin–Chipotle p/b H30	s.t.
7	Anders Lund (DEN)	CSC–Saxo Bank	s.t.
8	Magnus Bäckstedt (SWE)	Garmin–Chipotle p/b H30	+ 6"
9	Ian Stannard (GBR)	Great Britain	+ 7"
10	Óscar Sevilla (ESP)	Rock Racing	s.t.

=== Stage 3 ===
9 September 2008 – Chard to Burnham-on-Sea, 186 km (116 mi)

Stage 3 results

	Cyclist	Team	Time
1	Emilien Berges (FRA)	Agritubel	4h 49' 22"
2	Geoffroy Lequatre (FRA)	Agritubel	+ 30"
3	Gabriele Bosisio (ITA)	LPR Brakes–Ballan	s.t.
4	Dan Martin (IRE)	Garmin–Chipotle p/b H30	s.t.
5	Benny De Schrooder (BEL)	An Post–M Donnelly	s.t.
6	Ian Stannard (GBR)	Great Britain	s.t.
7	Steve Cummings (GBR)	Barloworld	s.t.
8	Daniel Fleeman (GBR)	An Post–M Donnelly	s.t.
9	Frederik Veuchelen (BEL)	Topsport Vlaanderen	+ 39"
10	Russell Downing (GBR)	Pinarello – CandiTV	+ 1' 45"

General Classification after Stage 3

	Cyclist	Team	Time
1	Emilien Berges (FRA)	Agritubel	10h 06' 17"
2	Geoffroy Lequatre (FRA)	Agritubel	+ 29"
3	Gabriele Bosisio (ITA)	LPR Brakes–Ballan	+ 36"
4	Ian Stannard (GBR)	Great Britain	+ 37"
5	Steve Cummings (GBR)	Barloworld	s.t.
6	Daniel Fleeman (GBR)	An Post–M Donnelly	+ 39"
7	Benny De Schrooder (BEL)	An Post–M Donnelly	+ 40"
8	Dan Martin (IRE)	Garmin–Chipotle p/b H30	s.t.
9	Frederik Veuchelen (BEL)	Topsport Vlaanderen	+ 49"
10	Russell Downing (GBR)	Pinarello – CandiTV	+ 1' 50"

=== Stage 4 ===
10 September 2008 – Worcester to Stoke-on-Trent, 157 km (98 mi)

Stage 4 results

	Cyclist	Team	Time
1	Edvald Boasson Hagen (NOR)	Team Columbia	3h 36' 11"
2	Giairo Ermeti (ITA)	LPR Brakes–Ballan	s.t.
3	Danilo Di Luca (ITA)	LPR Brakes–Ballan	+ 4"
4	Julian Dean (NZL)	Garmin–Chipotle p/b H30	s.t.
5	Kristof Goddaert (BEL)	Topsport Vlaanderen	s.t.
6	Dean Downing (GBR)	Rapha Condor–Recycling.co.uk	+ 7"
7	Steve Cummings (GBR)	Barloworld	s.t.
8	Daniel Lloyd (GBR)	An Post–M Donnelly	+ 9"
9	Geoffroy Lequatre (FRA)	Agritubel	s.t.
10	Matthew Goss (AUS)	CSC–Saxo Bank	s.t.

General Classification after Stage 4

	Cyclist	Team	Time
1	Geoffroy Lequatre (FRA)	Agritubel	13h 43' 06"
2	Steve Cummings (GBR)	Barloworld	+ 6"
3	Gabriele Bosisio (ITA)	LPR Brakes–Ballan	+ 10"
4	Ian Stannard (GBR)	Great Britain	+ 11"
5	Daniel Fleeman (GBR)	An Post–M Donnelly	+ 13"
6	Benny De Schrooder (BEL)	An Post–M Donnelly	+ 14"
7	Dan Martin (IRE)	Garmin–Chipotle p/b H30	s.t.
8	Frederik Veuchelen (BEL)	Topsport Vlaanderen	+ 23"
9	Emilien Berges (FRA)	Agritubel	+ 35"
10	Giairo Ermeti (ITA)	LPR Brakes–Ballan	+ 1' 03"

=== Stage 5 ===
11 September 2008 – Hull to Dalby Forest, 165 km (103 mi)

Stage 5 results

	Cyclist	Team	Time
1	Edvald Boasson Hagen (NOR)	Team Columbia	3h 46' 23"
2	Matthew Goss (AUS)	CSC–Saxo Bank	s.t.
3	Danilo Di Luca (ITA)	LPR Brakes–Ballan	s.t.
4	Víctor Hugo Peña (COL)	Rock Racing	s.t.
5	Julian Dean (NZL)	Garmin–Chipotle p/b H30	s.t.
6	Jonathan Bellis (GBR)	CSC–Saxo Bank	s.t.
7	Ben Swift (GBR)	Great Britain	s.t.
8	Roger Hammond (GBR)	Team Columbia	s.t.
9	Gabriele Bosisio (ITA)	LPR Brakes–Ballan	s.t.
10	Russell Downing (GBR)	Pinarello-CandiTV	s.t.

General Classification after Stage 5

	Cyclist	Team	Time
1	Geoffroy Lequatre (FRA)	Agritubel	17h 29' 40"
2	Steve Cummings (GBR)	Barloworld	+ 6"
3	Gabriele Bosisio (ITA)	LPR Brakes–Ballan	+ 10"
4	Ian Stannard (GBR)	Great Britain	+ 11"
5	Daniel Fleeman (GBR)	An Post–M Donnelly	+ 13"
6	Benny De Schrooder (BEL)	An Post–M Donnelly	+ 14"
7	Dan Martin (IRL)	Garmin–Chipotle p/b H30	s.t.
8	Frederik Veuchelen (BEL)	Topsport Vlaanderen	+ 23"
9	Emilien Berges (FRA)	Agritubel	+ 35"
10	Roger Hammond (GBR)	Garmin–Chipotle p/b H30	+ 1' 24"

=== Stage 6 ===
12 September 2008 – Darlington to Newcastle/Gateshead, 156 km (97 mi)

Stage 6 results

	Cyclist	Team	Time
1	Alessandro Petacchi (ITA)	LPR Brakes–Ballan	3h 45' 09"
2	Rob Hayles (GBR)	Great Britain	s.t.
3	Edvald Boasson Hagen (NOR)	Team Columbia	s.t.
4	Russell Downing (GBR)	Pinarello-CandiTV	s.t.
5	Malcolm Elliott (GBR)	Pinarello-CandiTV	s.t.
6	Ben Swift (GBR)	Great Britain	s.t.
7	Jonathan Bellis (GBR)	CSC–Saxo Bank	s.t.
8	Romain Feillu (FRA)	Agritubel	s.t.
9	Kenny Lisabeth (BEL)	An Post–M Donnelly	s.t.
10	Christopher Sutton (AUS)	Garmin–Chipotle p/b H30	s.t.

General Classification after Stage 6

	Cyclist	Team	Time
1	Geoffroy Lequatre (FRA)	Agritubel	21h 14' 49"
2	Steve Cummings (GBR)	Barloworld	+ 6"
3	Dan Martin (IRL)	Garmin–Chipotle p/b H30	+ 14"
4	Gabriele Bosisio (ITA)	LPR Brakes–Ballan	+ 15"
5	Ian Stannard (GBR)	Great Britain	+ 16"
6	Daniel Fleeman (GBR)	An Post–M Donnelly	+ 18"
7	Benny De Schrooder (BEL)	An Post–M Donnelly	+ 19"
8	Frederik Veuchelen (BEL)	Topsport Vlaanderen	+ 28"
9	Emilien Berges (FRA)	Agritubel	+ 40"
10	Russell Downing (GBR)	Pinarello-CandiTV	+ 1' 24"

=== Stage 7 ===
13 September 2008 – Glasgow Green to Drumlanrig Castle, 153 km (95 mi)

Stage 7 results

	Cyclist	Team	Time
1	Edvald Boasson Hagen (NOR)	Team Columbia	3h 45' 18"
2	Matthew Goss (AUS)	CSC–Saxo Bank	s.t.
3	Daryl Impey (RSA)	Barloworld	s.t.
4	Danilo Di Luca (ITA)	LPR Brakes–Ballan	s.t.
5	Julian Dean (NZL)	Garmin–Chipotle p/b H30	s.t.
6	Fred Rodriguez (USA)	Rock Racing	+ 5"
7	Cameron Meyer (AUS)	SouthAustralia.com–AIS	s.t.
8	Gregory Henderson (NZL)	Team Columbia	+ 26"
9	Kristof Goddaert (BEL)	Topsport Vlaanderen	+ 2' 18"
10	Roger Hammond (GBR)	Team Columbia	s.t.

General Classification after Stage 7

	Cyclist	Team	Time
1	Geoffroy Lequatre (FRA)	Agritubel	25h 02' 25"
2	Steve Cummings (GBR)	Barloworld	+ 6"
3	Dan Martin (IRL)	Garmin–Chipotle p/b H30	+ 14"
4	Gabriele Bosisio (ITA)	LPR Brakes–Ballan	+ 15"
5	Ian Stannard (GBR)	Great Britain	+ 16"
6	Daniel Fleeman (GBR)	An Post–M Donnelly	+ 18"
7	Benny De Schrooder (BEL)	An Post–M Donnelly	+ 19"
8	Frederik Veuchelen (BEL)	Topsport Vlaanderen	+ 28"
9	Emilien Berges (FRA)	Agritubel	+ 40"
10	Russell Downing (GBR)	Pinarello-CandiTV	+ 1' 24"

=== Stage 8 ===
14 September 2008 – Blackpool to Liverpool, 110 km (68 mi)

The final stage departed from Blackpool and finished in Liverpool with six laps of a city centre circuit. Alessandro Petacchi took the stage win, his third of the tour, whilst Geoffroy Lequatre finished third to win the general classification.

Stage 8 results

	Cyclist	Team	Time
1	Alessandro Petacchi (ITA)	LPR Brakes–Ballan	2h 19' 25"
2	Julian Dean (NZL)	Garmin–Chipotle p/b H30	s.t.
3	Robbie Hunter (RSA)	Barloworld	s.t.
4	Matthew Goss (AUS)	CSC–Saxo Bank	s.t.
5	Rob Hayles (GBR)	Great Britain	s.t.
6	Christopher Sutton (AUS)	Garmin–Chipotle p/b H30	s.t.
7	Roger Hammond (GBR)	Team Columbia	s.t.
8	Juan Van Heerden (RSA)	Team MTN	s.t.
9	Russell Downing (GBR)	Pinarello – CandiTV	s.t.
10	Kenny Lisabeth (BEL)	An Post–M Donnelly	s.t.

General Classification after Stage 8

	Cyclist	Team	Time
1	Geoffroy Lequatre (FRA)	Agritubel	27h 21' 49"
2	Steve Cummings (GBR)	Barloworld	+ 6"
3	Ian Stannard (GBR)	Great Britain	+ 14"
4	Dan Martin (IRL)	Garmin–Chipotle p/b H30	+ 15"
5	Gabriele Bosisio (ITA)	LPR Brakes–Ballan	+ 16"
6	Benny De Schrooder (BEL)	An Post–M Donnelly	+ 20"
7	Daniel Fleeman (GBR)	An Post–M Donnelly	+ 25"
8	Frederik Veuchelen (BEL)	Topsport Vlaanderen	+ 29"
9	Emilien Berges (FRA)	Agritubel	+ 50"
10	Russell Downing (GBR)	Pinarello-CandiTV	+ 1' 25"

== Classification leadership ==
Stage	Winner	General classification	Sprint Classification	Mountains Classification	Points Classification	Team Classification
1	Alessandro Petacchi	Alessandro Petacchi	Anders Lund	Kristian House	Alessandro Petacchi	
2	Matthew Goss	Alessandro Petacchi	Danilo Di Luca	Kristian House	Alessandro Petacchi	
3	Emilien Berges	Emilien Berges	Danilo Di Luca	Kristian House	Roger Hammond	
4	Edvald Boasson Hagen	Geoffroy Lequatre	Giairo Ermeti	Ben Swift	Roger Hammond	
5	Edvald Boasson Hagen	Geoffroy Lequatre	Danilo Di Luca	Ben Swift	Matthew Goss	
6	Alessandro Petacchi	Geoffroy Lequatre	Danilo Di Luca	Ben Swift	Alessandro Petacchi	Agritubel
7	Edvald Boasson Hagen	Geoffroy Lequatre	Edvald Boasson Hagen	Danilo Di Luca	Edvald Boasson Hagen	
8	Alessandro Petacchi	Geoffroy Lequatre	Edvald Boasson Hagen	Danilo Di Luca	Matthew Goss	Agritubel
Final		Geoffroy Lequatre	Edvald Boasson Hagen	Danilo Di Luca	Matthew Goss	Agritubel
