= Benny De Schrooder =

Belgian professional road bicycle racer

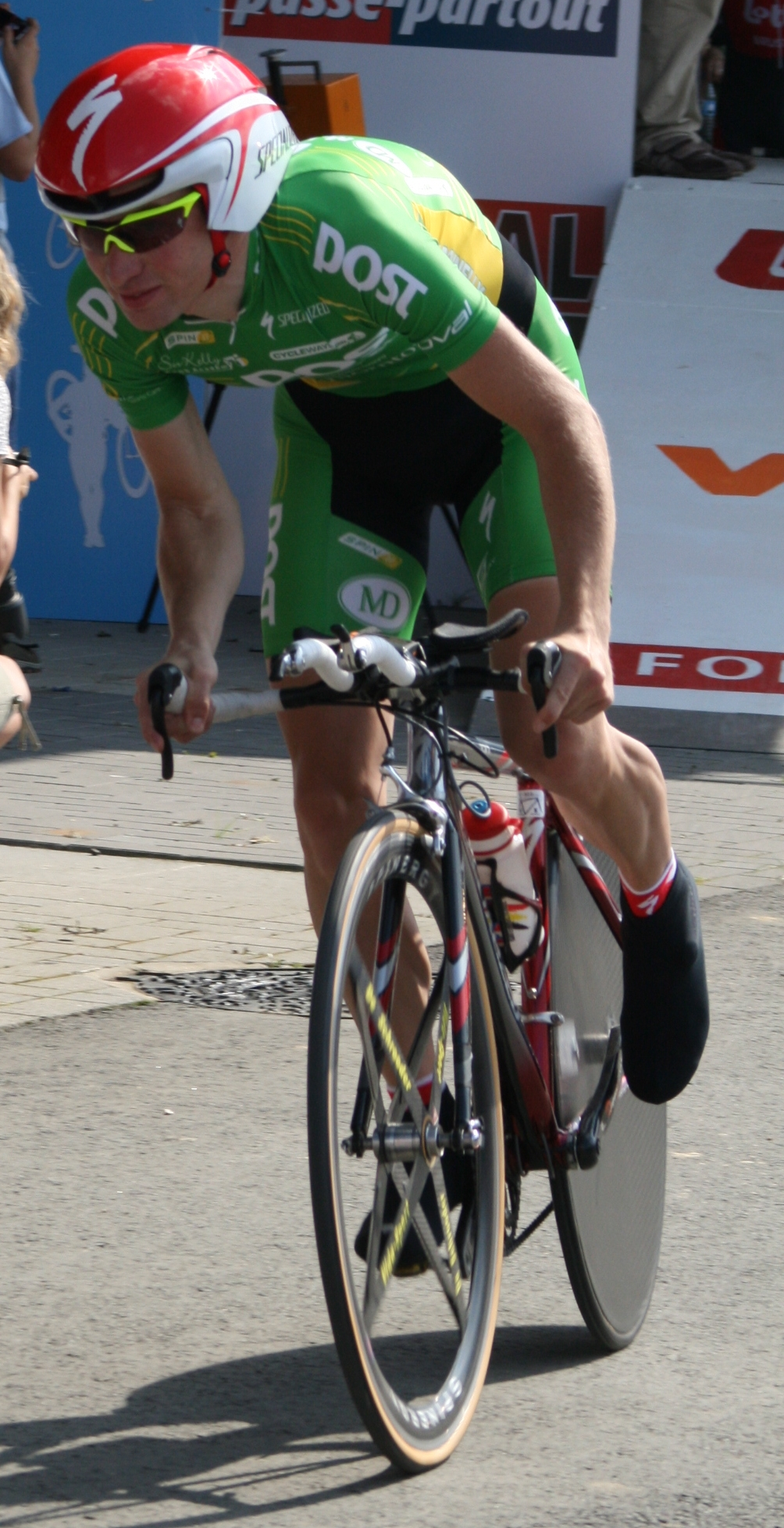

Personal information
- Full name: Benny De Schrooder
- Born: 23 July 1980 (age 46) Knokke, Belgium
- Height: 1.73 m (5 ft 8 in)
- Weight: 60 kg (132 lb)

Cycling career
- Sport: Cycling
- Current team: Retired
- Discipline: Road
- Role: Rider

Professional teams
- 2003: Palmans–Collstrop (stagiaire)
- 2004–2007: Vlaanderen–T Interim
- 2008–2010: An Post–M.Donnelly–Grant Thornton–Sean Kelly

Benny De Schrooder (23 July 1980) is a Belgian former professional road bicycle racer.

== Major results ==
2002
1st Stage 2 Tour de Namur
3rd Overall Kreiz Breizh Elites
10th Grand Prix Criquielion
2003
8th Kattekoers
2004
1st Grand Prix de la Ville de Lillers
4th Nationale Sluitingprijs
2006
2nd Nationale Sluitingprijs
10th Subida al Naranco
2007
8th GP du canton d'Argovie
2008
1st Stage 1 (TTT) Vuelta a Extremadura
5th Halle–Ingooigem
5th Grand Prix Cerami
6th Overall Tour of Britain
7th Overall Étoile de Bessèges
9th Overall FBD Insurance Ras
