= Geoffroy Lequatre =

French cyclist (born 1986)

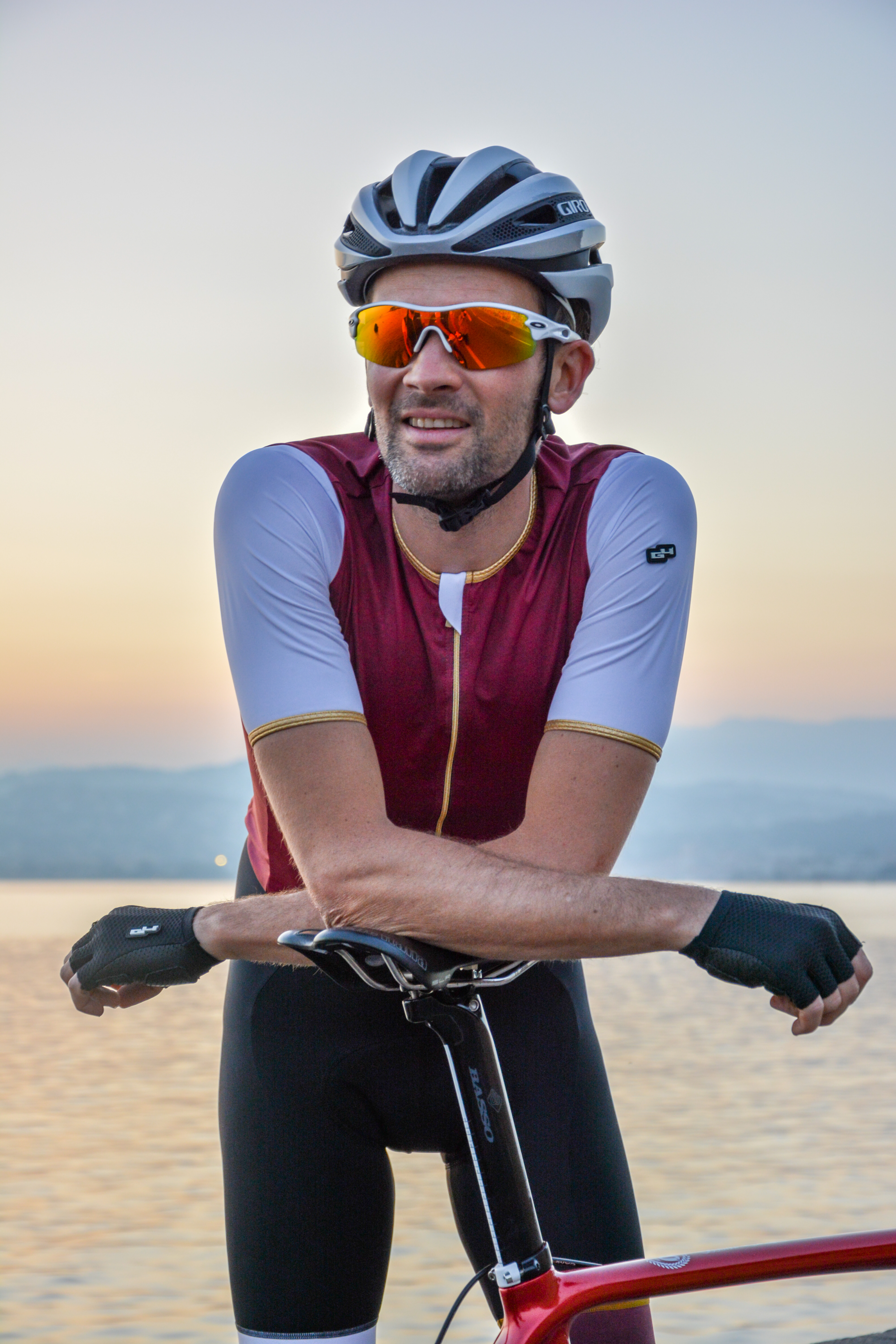
- Lequatre in 2018

Personal information
- Full name: Geoffroy Lequatre
- Born: 30 June 1981 (age 45) Pithiviers, France
- Height: 1.83 m (6 ft 0 in)
- Weight: 64 kg (141 lb)

Cycling career
- Sport: Cycling
- Discipline: Road
- Role: Rider

Amateur team
- 2002–2003: Crédit Agricole Espoirs

Professional teams
- 2004–2005: Crédit Agricole
- 2006–2007: Cofidis
- 2008–2009: Agritubel
- 2010–2011: Team RadioShack
- 2012–2013: Bretagne–Schuller

Major wins
- Stage races Tour of Britain (2008)

Geoffroy Lequatre (born 30 June 1981) is a French road bicycle racer, who competed professionally between 2004 and 2013 for the Crédit Agricole, Cofidis, Agritubel, Team RadioShack and Bretagne–Séché Environnement teams. He was best known for winning the 2008 Tour of Britain.

== Major results ==
2002
1st GP de la Ville de Pérenchies
2nd Flèche Ardennaise
5th Road race, UCI Under-23 Road World Championships
8th Road race, UEC European Under-23 Road Championships
9th Overall Tour du Loir et Cher E Provost
2003
2nd GP Stad Vilvoorde
3rd Paris–Tours Espoirs
4th GP de la Ville de Pérenchies
5th Paris-Troyes
5th Tour du Jura
7th Overall Tour de la Somme
9th Overall Tour de Normandie
10th Boucle de l'Artois
2004
7th Overall Tour du Limousin
2006
4th Paris–Bourges
2007
6th Étoile de Bessèges
7th Volta ao Algarve
10th Kuurne–Brussels–Kuurne
2008
1st Overall Tour of Britain
4th Grand Prix d'Ouverture La Marseillaise
5th Tour du Finistère
6th Overall Tour du Limousin
9th GP Ouest–France
2009
6th Kuurne–Brussels–Kuurne
7th Tour of Britain
7th Route Adélie
2010
3rd Classica Sarda Olbia-Pantogia
7th Châteauroux Classic
2011
3rd Time trial, National Road Championships
7th Paris–Tours
9th Overall Tour of Austria
2012
4th Paris–Camembert
