= Cycling at the 2006 Commonwealth Games – Men's individual pursuit =

The men's individual pursuit at the 2006 Commonwealth Games took place on March 16, 2006 at the Vodafone Arena.

== Qualification ==
Rank	Rider	Time	Average Speed (km/h)
1	Paul Manning (ENG)	4:21.801	55.003
2	Rob Hayles (ENG)	4:21.837	54.996
3	Jason Allen (NZL)	4:22.941	54.765
4	Steve Cummings (ENG)	4:25.570	54.222
5	Marc Ryan (NZL)	4:26.773	53.978
6	Michael Hutchinson (NIR)	4:28.882	53.555
7	Mark Jamieson (AUS)	4:30.399	53.254
8	Hayden Roulston (NZL)	4:30.742	53.187
9	Zachary Bell (CAN)	4:31.831	52.974
10	Peter Dawson (AUS)	4:34.269	52.503
11	Svein Tuft (CAN)	4:36.390	52.100
12	Rupert Rheeder (RSA)	4:40.078	51.414
13	Muhammad Fauzan Ahmad Lufti (MAS)	4:46.271	50.301
14	Amirrudin Jamaludin (MAS)	4:49.106	49.808

== Finals ==
Gold medal race

Rank	Name	Time
1st place, gold medalist(s)	Paul Manning (ENG)	4:23.799
2nd place, silver medalist(s)	Rob Hayles (ENG)	4:28.616

Bronze medal race

Rank	Name	Time
3rd place, bronze medalist(s)	Steve Cummings (ENG)	4:24.767
4	Jason Allen (NZL)	4:30.319
