= Steve Cummings =

British racing cyclist

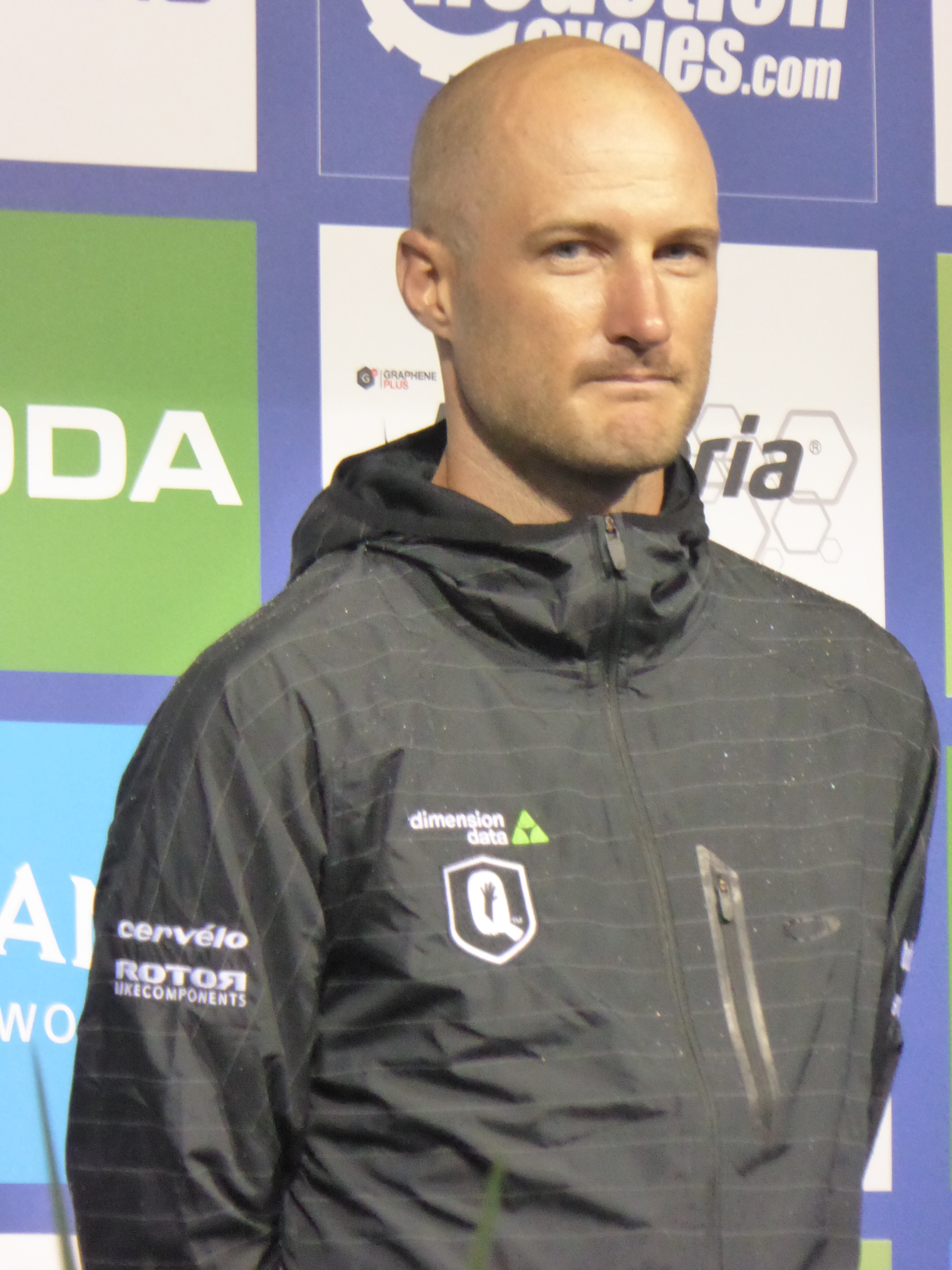
- Cummings at the 2016 Tour of Britain

Personal information
- Full name: Stephen Philip Cummings
- Nickname: Steve-o
- Born: 19 March 1981 (age 45) Clatterbridge, Merseyside, England, United Kingdom
- Height: 1.90 m (6 ft 3 in)
- Weight: 75 kg (165 lb)

Cycling career
- Sport: Cycling
- Current team: Team Jayco–AlUla
- Disciplines: Road; Track
- Role: Rider (retired); Directeur sportif
- Rider type: Rouleur; Breakaway specialist

Amateur team
- –: Birkenhead North End CC

Professional teams
- 2005–2006: Landbouwkrediet–Colnago
- 2007: Discovery Channel
- 2008–2009: Barloworld
- 2010–2011: Team Sky
- 2012–2014: BMC Racing Team
- 2015–2019: MTN–Qhubeka

Managerial teams
- 2021–2024: INEOS Grenadiers
- 2025–: Team Jayco–AlUla

Major wins
- Road Grand Tours Tour de France 2 individual stages (2015, 2016) Vuelta a España 1 individual stage (2012) Stage races Tour of Britain (2016) One-day races and Classics National Road Race Championships (2017) National Time Trial Championships (2017) Track World Championships Team pursuit (2005)
Medal record
Men's track cycling
Representing Great Britain
Olympic Games
Silver medal – second place	2004 Athens	Team pursuit
World Championships
Gold medal – first place	2005 Los Angeles	Team pursuit
Silver medal – second place	2006 Bordeaux	Team pursuit
Representing England
Commonwealth Games
Gold medal – first place	2006 Melbourne	Team pursuit
Bronze medal – third place	2006 Melbourne	Individual pursuit

Stephen Philip Cummings (born 19 March 1981) is an English former racing cyclist, who rode professionally between 2005 and 2019 for the Landbouwkrediet–Colnago, Discovery Channel, Barloworld, Team Sky, BMC Racing Team and Team Dimension Data squads, and rode for Great Britain at the Summer Olympic Games, the UCI Road World Championships, and the UCI Track Cycling World Championships.

During his professional road racing career, Cummings took seventeen victories, including Grand Tour stage wins at the 2012 Vuelta a España, the 2015 Tour de France and the 2016 Tour de France. He won both the British National Road Race Championships and the British National Time Trial Championships in 2017, and also won stages of the Tour of Beijing, Tirreno–Adriatico, Tour of the Basque Country and Critérium du Dauphiné races at UCI World Tour level. On the track, Cummings won gold medals in the team pursuit at both the 2005 UCI Track Cycling World Championships and the 2006 Commonwealth Games, and a silver medal in the same event at the 2004 Olympic Games in Athens.

Since retiring from racing, Cummings worked as a directeur sportif for UCI WorldTeam Netcompany–Ineos. He joined Team Jayco–AlUla as a Sport Director in December 2024.

== Biography ==
Cummings was born in Clatterbridge on the Wirral Peninsula in Northwest England and grew up in the nearby village of Pensby.

=== Early career ===
In 1999, riding for Birkenhead North End CC as a junior, aged 17, he won the Eddie Soens Memorial Road Race, a handicap race open to all categories. It remains the only time that a junior rider has won the race. He went on to take the junior British National Road Race Championships that year.

Representing his country Cummings won the team pursuit at the 2005 UCI Track Cycling World Championships in Los Angeles and at the 2006 Commonwealth Games in Melbourne with the British and English cycling teams respectively. He also took bronze in the individual pursuit at the 2006 Commonwealth Games. At the 2004 Olympics in Athens Cummings and the Great Britain team won the silver medal in the team pursuit and achieved a time of 3:59.866 in the heats.

He rode for Landbouwkrediet–Colnago in 2005 and 2006, recording second-place finishes at the 2005 British National Road Race Championships and the 2006 Trofeo Laigueglia, to Russell Downing and Alessandro Ballan respectively. In 2007 he switched to Discovery Channel, making his first start at a Grand Tour by riding the Giro d'Italia – as a late replacement for defending race winner Ivan Basso.

=== Barloworld (2008–2009) ===
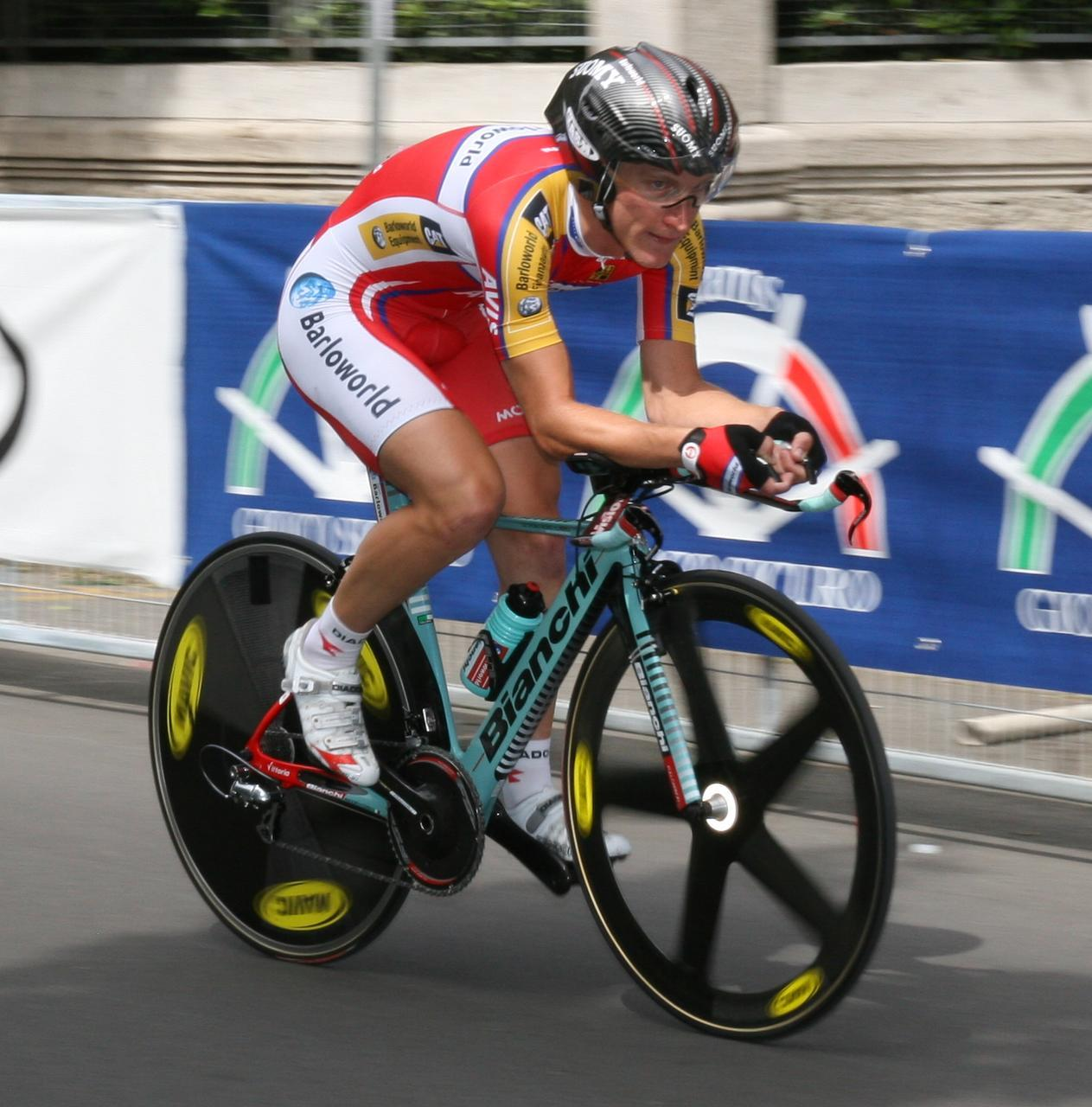
Cummings at the 2008 Giro d'Italia

With Discovery Channel folding at the end of the 2007 season, Cummings moved to Barloworld for the 2008 season – joining his compatriot Geraint Thomas at the team. In his second start with the team, Cummings won stage 2 of February's Giro della Provincia di Reggio Calabria. He again rode the Giro d'Italia, recording a fourth-place stage result on the final summit finish of the race at Monte Pora, having been a part of the breakaway. In the second half of the season, he recorded second-place overall finishes at the Danmark Rundt and the Tour of Britain, but did take his second win of the year at the Coppa Bernocchi, in a three-rider sprint.

The following year saw Cummings take a single victory in the third Giro del Capo challenge, with other top-five finishes at the Giro della Provincia di Reggio Calabria (fifth), and the Coppa Bernocchi (fourth). Despite this, Barloworld folded at the end of the season.

=== Team Sky (2010–2011) ===
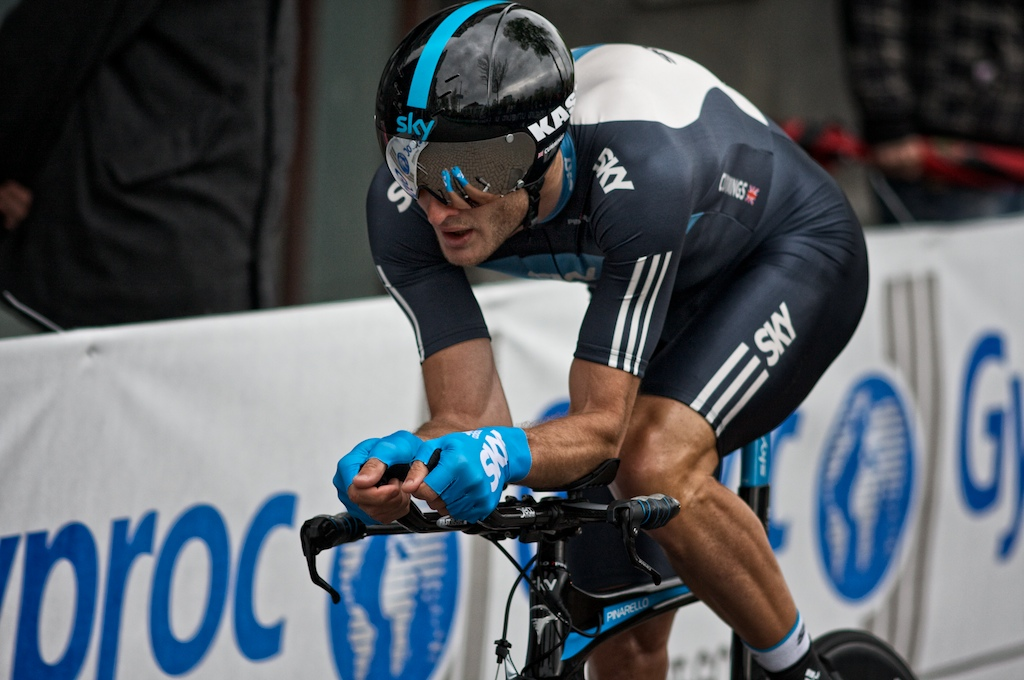
Cummings at the 2010 Giro d'Italia

Cummings was one of four former Barloworld riders to join new British-based Team Sky for the 2010 season, signing a two-year contract. His best result during the season was a fourth-place finish at the Grand Prix d'Ouverture La Marseillaise in January.

In 2011, he had arguably his most successful professional race to that point at February's Volta ao Algarve. He won stage three in a mountain-top finish ahead of Alberto Contador, taking the overall lead of the race which he held until the final individual time trial; he finished the race in seventh place. In September, Cummings finished second to teammate Alex Dowsett at the British National Time Trial Championships, before finishing second overall in the Tour of Britain. He was part of the Great Britain team that helped Mark Cavendish win the road race at the UCI Road World Championships in Denmark, and then finished fourth overall in the first Tour of Beijing.

=== BMC Racing Team (2012–2014) ===
==== 2012 ====
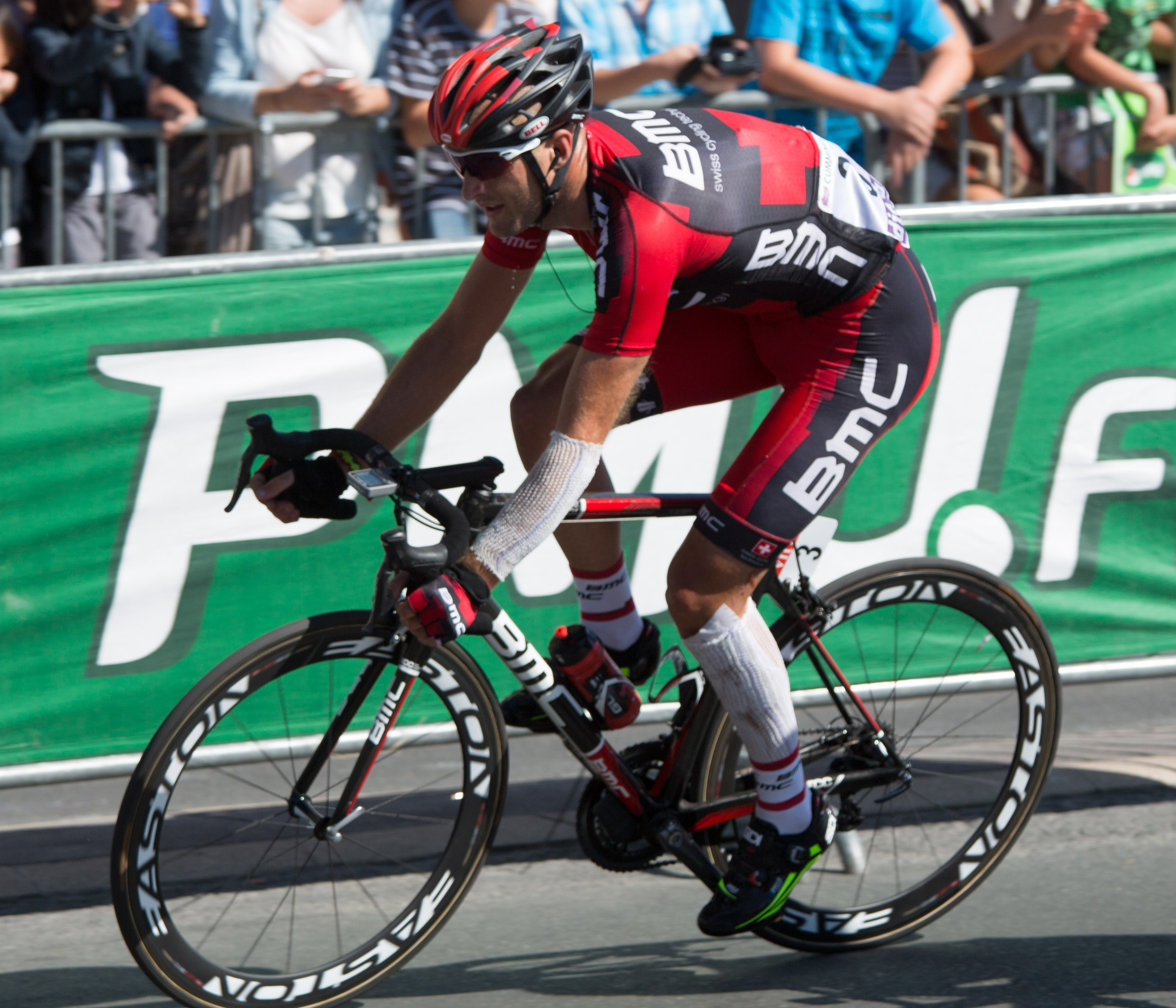
Cummings at the 2012 Tour de France

In September 2011, Cummings signed a contract with the BMC Racing Team for the 2012 season. The following February, Cummings broke his pelvis in an accident while competing in the Volta ao Algarve. In April, bad luck struck again when he fractured his left wrist in the Tour of the Basque Country. He recuperated from those injuries and competed in the Tour de France, where he was a domestique to his leader Cadel Evans and finished 95th overall. In the Vuelta a España, he gained his first Grand Tour stage victory. On Stage 13, he broke away with six other riders after the first hour of racing. The break made it through on the mainly flat course and he attacked with about 4 kilometres (2.5 miles) to race, creating a gap. He held on to his lead and won by four seconds over the two chasers, Cameron Meyer of Orica–GreenEDGE and Team Sky's Juan Antonio Flecha. He completed his season with a stage victory on the final day of the Tour of Beijing, getting the better of Ryder Hesjedal in a sprint à deux in Pinggu.

==== 2013–2014 ====
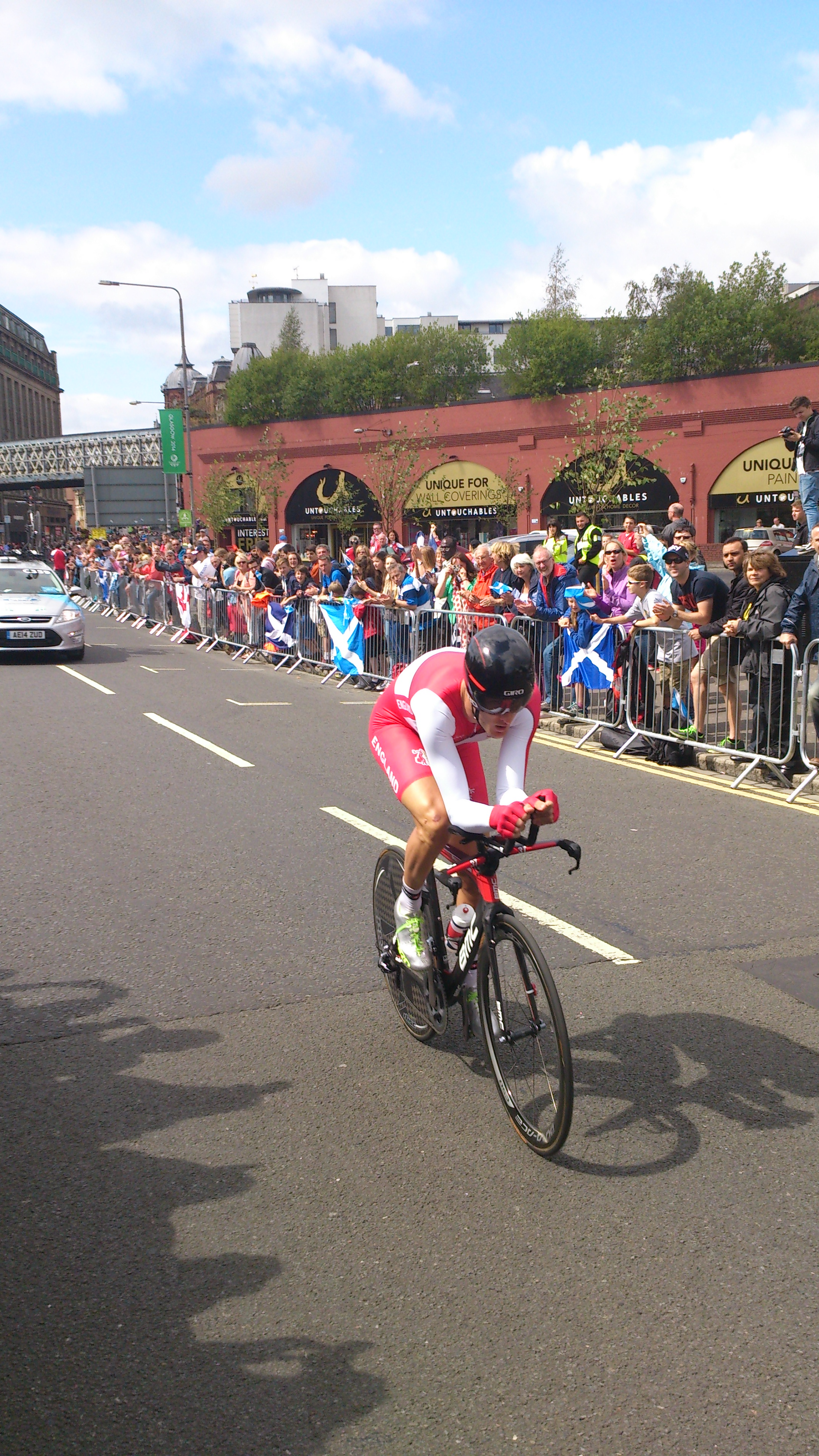
Cummings during the road time trial at the 2014 Commonwealth Games

Cummings did not take an individual win in 2013, with his only win coming as part of the BMC Racing Team squad that won the stage two team time trial at the Tour of Qatar. At the start of the 2014 season, Cummings took second place at the Dubai Tour behind teammate Taylor Phinney, before winning the individual time trial stage and the general classification at the Tour Méditerranéen, recording his first stage race victory. He also represented England at the Commonwealth Games, finishing in seventh place in the road time trial.

=== MTN–Qhubeka/Dimension Data (2015–2019) ===
==== 2015 ====
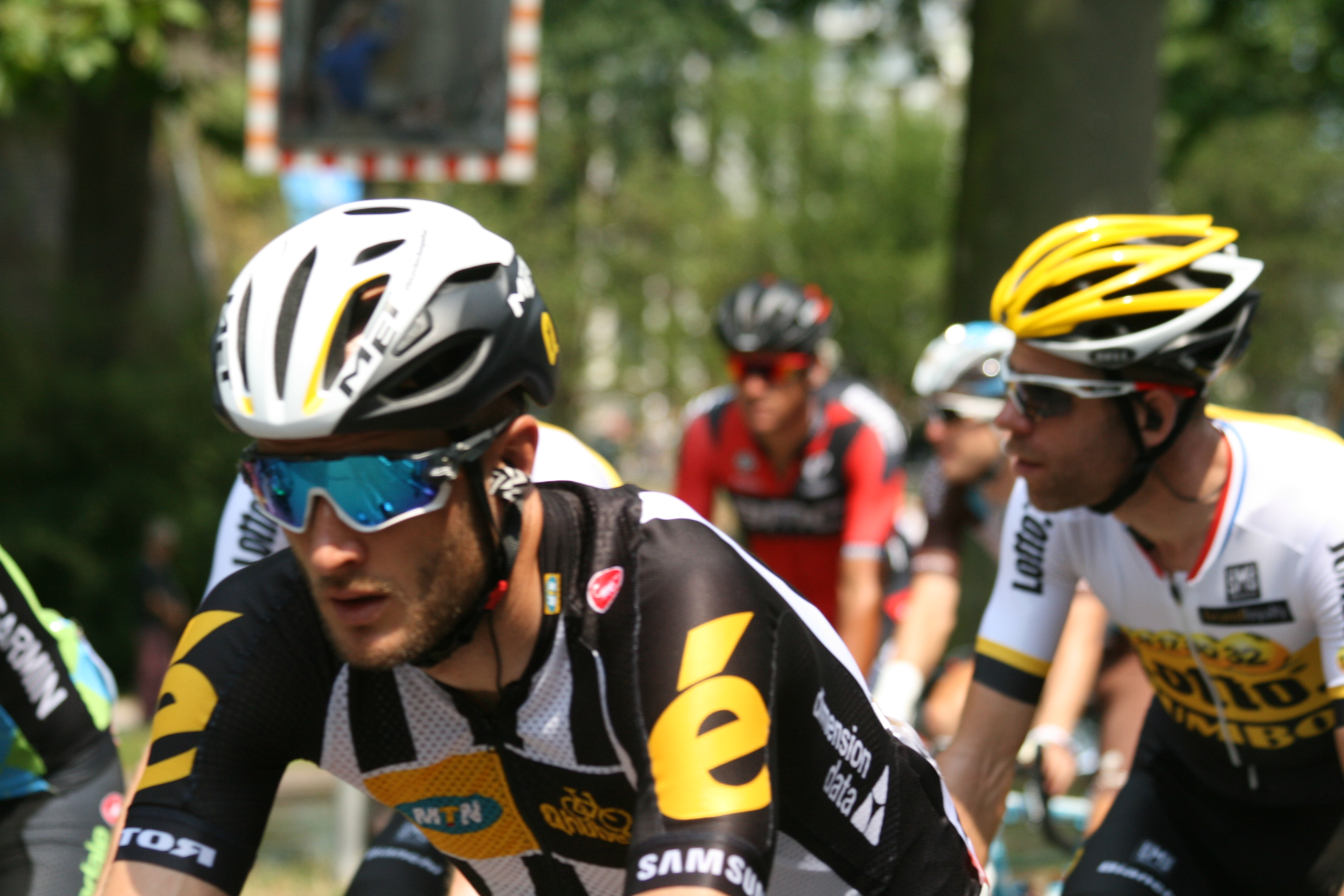
Cummings (left) at the 2015 Tour de France, where he won stage 14 of the race

In October 2014, Cummings announced that he would be joining MTN–Qhubeka for the 2015 season. In his first race with the team, Cummings won the Trofeo Andratx-Mirador d'Es Colomer one-day race, held as part of the season-opening Vuelta a Mallorca; he attacked on the final climb of the race, and was able to fend off Alejandro Valverde in the closing metres for the win. He recorded top-ten overall finishes at the Tirreno–Adriatico and Circuit de la Sarthe stage races in the spring, finishing sixth in both events. In July, Cummings won stage 14 of the Tour de France, beating French riders Thibaut Pinot and Romain Bardet to the line at the Mende Aerodrome, after the trio had gone clear at the top of the Côte de la Croix Neuve – a second-category climb with 1.5 kilometres (0.93 miles) remaining. It was the first Tour de France stage win for both Cummings and his South African team MTN–Qhubeka, with the result coming on Mandela Day.

==== 2016 ====
In his first start of the 2016 season, Cummings won the fourth stage of March's Tirreno–Adriatico; having been part of the breakaway, Cummings attacked with approximately 3 kilometres (1.9 miles) remaining of the 222-kilometre (138-mile) stage to Foligno, and soloed to a 13-second winning margin over his closest competitors. The following month, he won the third stage of the Tour of the Basque Country, outfoxing the peloton with a move with 1 kilometre (0.62 miles) to go, and held on to win by several metres in Lesaka. In his final warm-up race prior to the Tour de France, Cummings won the final stage of the Critérium du Dauphiné, having attacked with 50 kilometres (31 miles) remaining on the fourth of the day's six categorised climbs, and ended up winning the stage by almost four minutes.

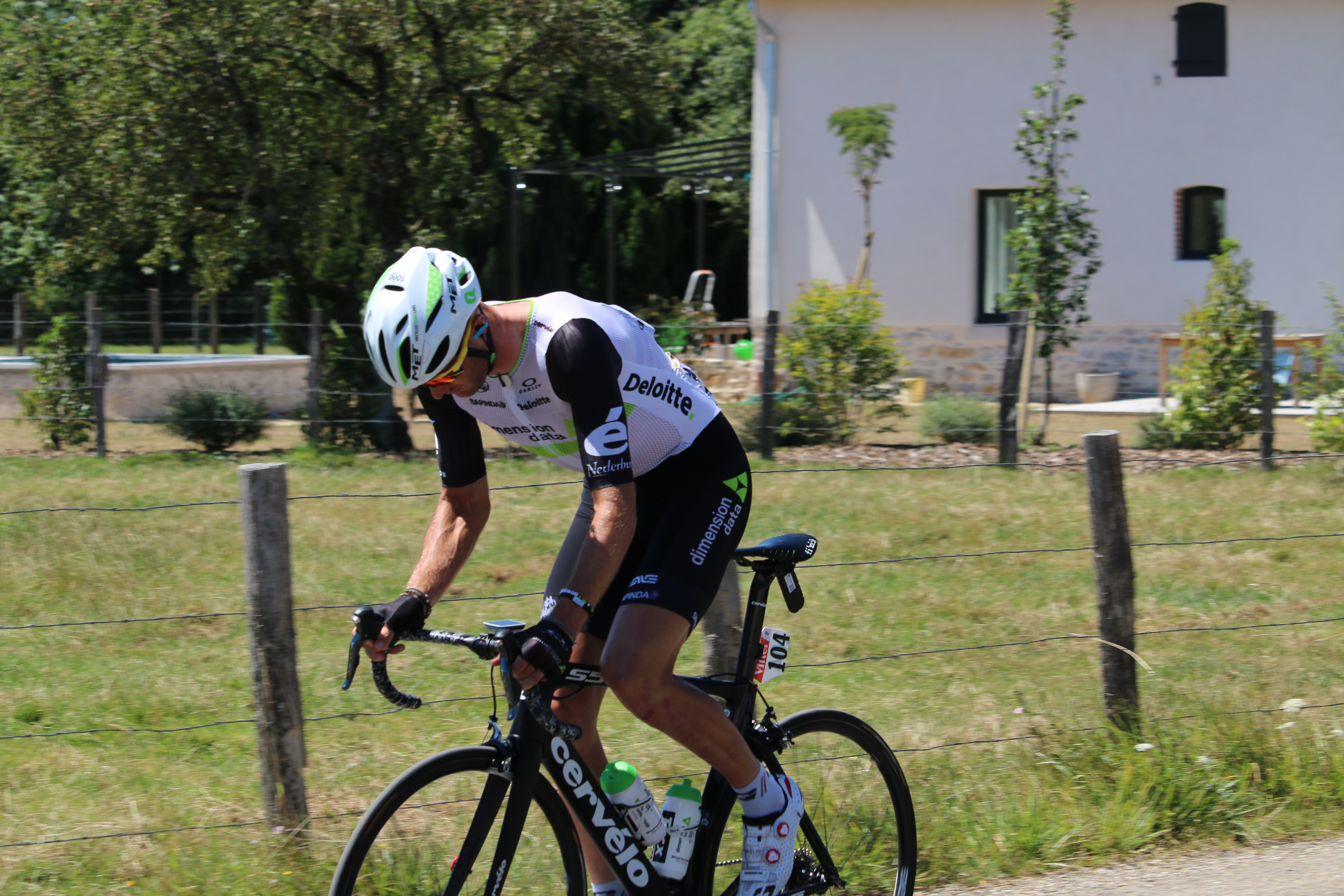
Cummings at the 2016 Tour de France, where he won a stage of the race for the second year in succession

After six stages of July's Tour de France, Cummings had lost almost 45 minutes to the race leader Greg Van Avermaet, and was in 191st place out of the 198 competitors. On the seventh stage, Cummings took another breakaway win, having dropped his breakaway companions just before the intermediate sprint at Sarrancolin; he would go on to win the stage at Lac de Payolle by 64 seconds, over Daryl Impey and Daniel Navarro. In the same month, he was named to Great Britain's cycling team for the Olympic Games in Rio – replacing Peter Kennaugh for the road race. Cummings had previously been left out of the team when it was announced at the beginning of the month, and had lobbied to the British media for coach Rod Ellingworth to quit – due to his involvement with Team Sky, with four riders from the team forming part of the five-man British squad.

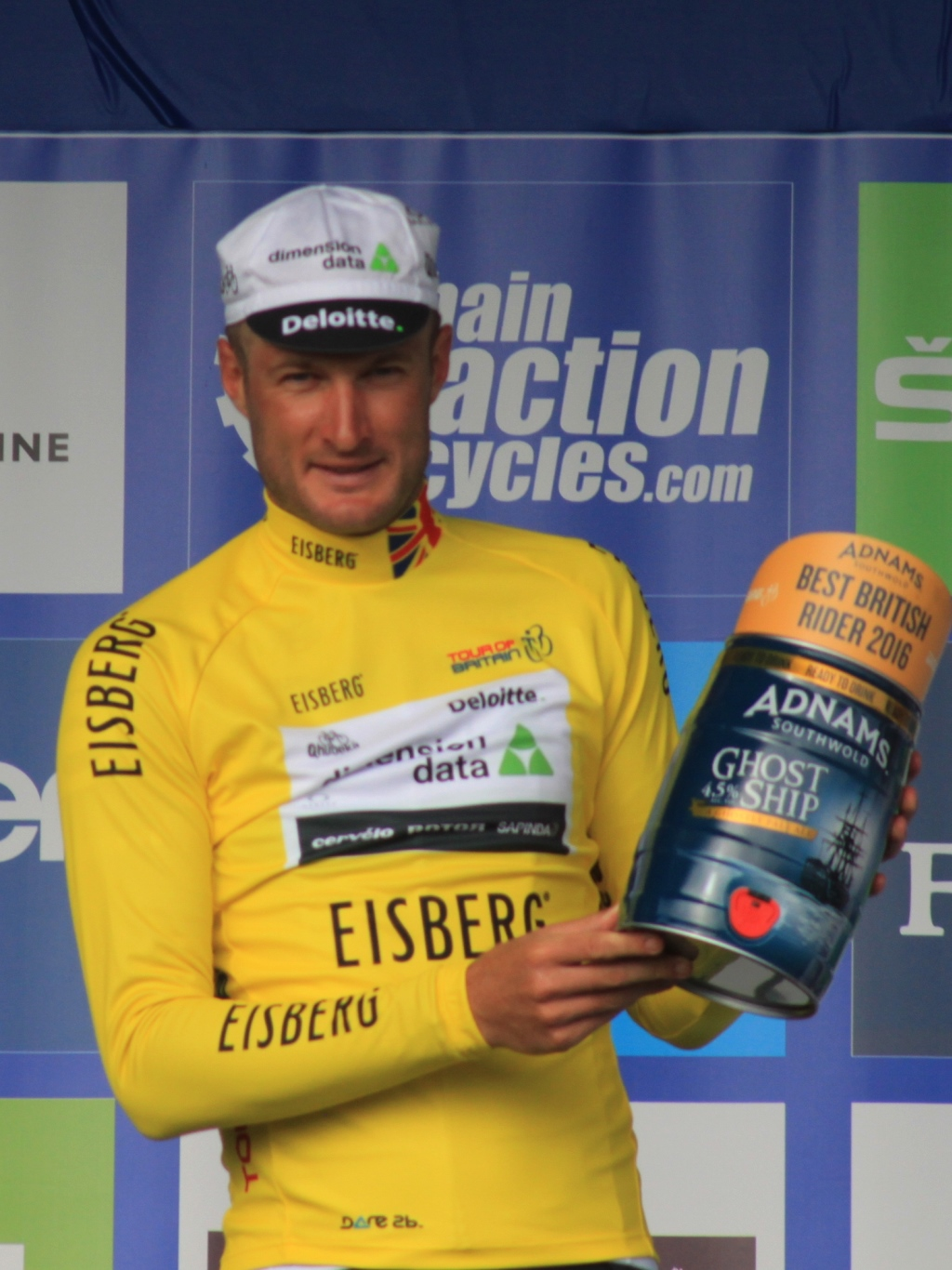
Having previously finished second in 2008 and 2011, Cummings won the Tour of Britain for the first time, in 2016

He then rode his home race, the Tour of Britain, as part of Team Dimension Data alongside Mark Cavendish. On the second stage in Cumbria, Cummings was part of a group that broke clear on the Kirkstone Pass to chase down the breakaway; a small lead group was formed on the run-in to Kendal, and only Julien Vermote was able to follow the attacks put in by Cummings. Cummings led up the final climb in Kendal, but Vermote pulled clear as the gradient eased and took the stage win and the leader's jersey, while Cummings gained approximately a minute on his main general classification rivals. Cummings took over the race lead following the sixth stage, a summit finish at Haytor, as Vermote lost around 90 seconds to him. Despite Rohan Dennis taking time off him in both of the stages held in Bristol on the penultimate day, Cummings maintained his race lead and ultimately won the race for the first time – the first home win since Bradley Wiggins in 2013 – by 26 seconds from Dennis. Writing for The Guardian, journalist William Fotheringham considered this win for Cummings as the most important stage race victory of his career up to that date.

==== 2017–2019 ====
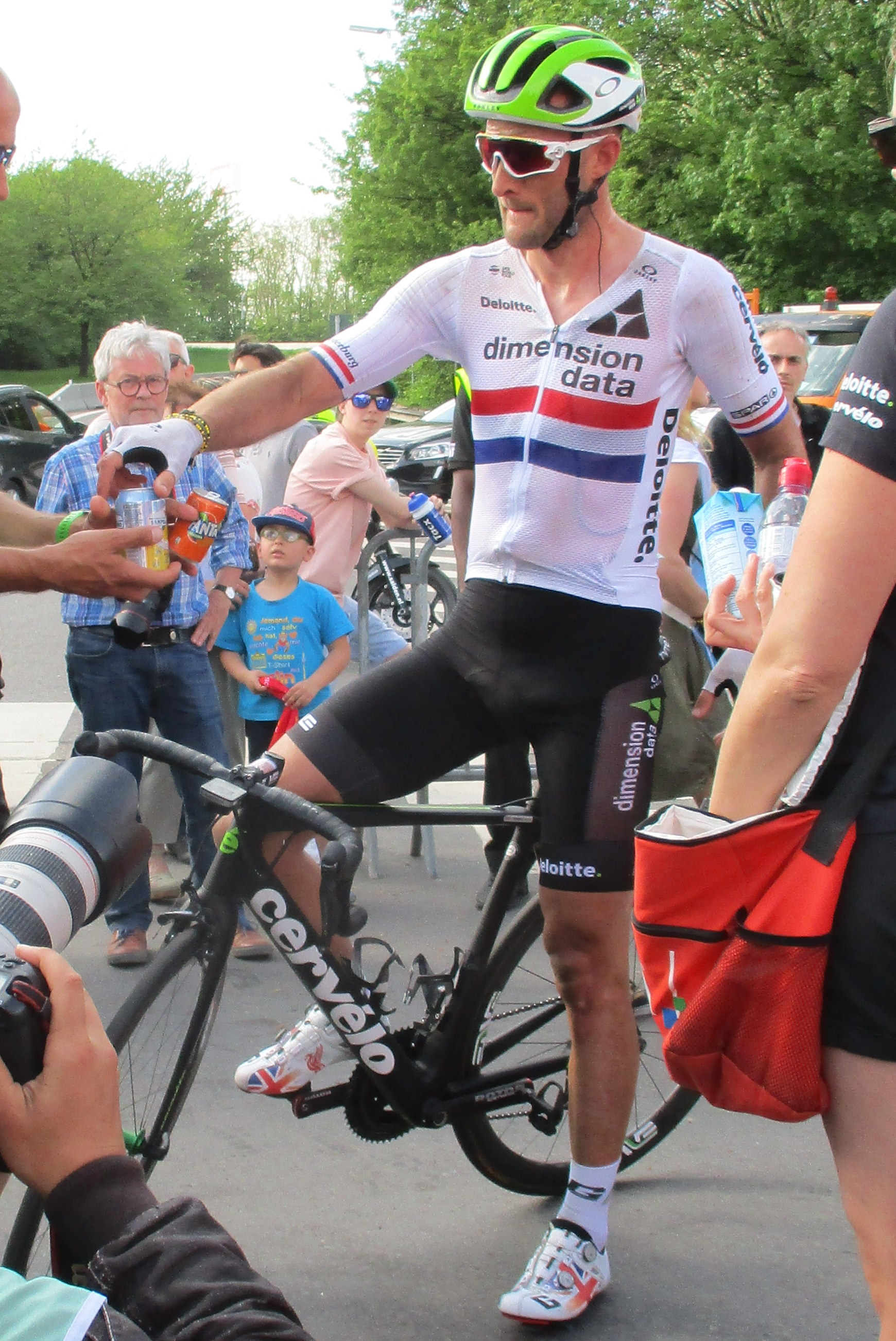
Cummings at the 2018 Liège–Bastogne–Liège, wearing the British national champion's jersey

During the 2017 Tour of the Basque Country, Cummings crashed heavily and required surgery for fractures to his left clavicle and scapula, as well as his sternum. After a long period of recovery he won both the British National Time Trial Championships and the British National Road Race Championships on the Isle of Man, becoming only the second rider to win both titles in the same year after David Millar achieved the same feat in 2007. These performances earned him a new contract with Team Dimension Data. He took one further victory, winning the opening stage of September's Giro della Toscana, having been overlooked for the British team for the road race at UCI Road World Championships in Norway. It would turn out to be the final victory for Cummings in his professional career.

Cummings endured a difficult 2018 season, recording no top-10 finishes, and suffering health issues with an injury to the head of his left fibula at the Tour of Austria, and breathing problems at the Critérium du Dauphiné. In 2019, Cummings finished in third place at the British National Time Trial Championships in Norfolk, and also finished in tenth place overall at the Arctic Race of Norway, but injury and illnesses continued to effect Cummings. Later in the year at the Tour of Britain – and having featured in the final selection on the fourth stage – on home roads in the Metropolitan Borough of Wirral, Cummings was involved in a crash some 50 kilometres (31 miles) from the finish of the fifth stage. He was later diagnosed with four fractured vertebrae in his back, ending his season.

=== Retirement, directeur sportif ===
In November 2019, Cummings announced his retirement from professional cycling.

In February 2021 Cummings announced that he was returning to Team Sky, since renamed as INEOS Grenadiers, joining the team's management as a development directeur sportif and coach. In December 2023, he was appointed as the team's director of racing from the 2024 season onwards.

In November 2024 Cummings announced he had left his role as Director of Racing at Ineos Grenadiers. Shortly after it was confirmed that he would join Team Jayco–AlUla as a Sport Director from 2025.

== Major results ==
=== Road ===
1999
1st Road race, National Junior Championships
1st Eddie Soens Memorial Race
2001
10th Lincoln Grand Prix
2003
10th Overall Tour de Berlin
2005
2nd Road race, National Championships
6th Grand Prix de Villers-Cotterêts
2006
2nd Trofeo Laigueglia
4th Road race, Commonwealth Games
2008 (2 pro wins)
1st Coppa Bernocchi
2nd Overall Giro della Provincia di Reggio Calabria

1st Stage 2

2nd Overall Danmark Rundt
2nd Overall Tour of Britain
2009
1st Stage 3 Giro del Capo
4th Coppa Bernocchi
5th Giro della Provincia di Reggio Calabria
7th Trofeo Laigueglia
2010
4th Grand Prix d'Ouverture La Marseillaise
2011 (1)
2nd Time trial, National Championships
2nd Overall Tour of Britain
4th Overall Tour of Beijing
7th Overall Volta ao Algarve

1st Stage 3

9th Overall Tour de Pologne
9th Overall Tour Méditerranéen
2012 (2)
1st Stage 13 Vuelta a España
1st Stage 5 Tour of Beijing
2013
1st Stage 2 (TTT) Tour of Qatar
2014 (2)
1st Overall Tour Méditerranéen

1st Stage 4 (ITT)

2nd Overall Dubai Tour
4th Overall Tour du Poitou-Charentes
7th Time trial, Commonwealth Games
8th Overall Circuit de la Sarthe
2015 (2)
1st Trofeo Andratx-Mirador d'Es Colomer
1st Stage 14 Tour de France
6th Overall Tirreno–Adriatico
6th Overall Circuit de la Sarthe
2016 (5)
1st Overall Tour of Britain
1st Stage 7 Tour de France
1st Stage 4 Tirreno–Adriatico
1st Stage 3 Tour of the Basque Country
1st Stage 7 Criterium du Dauphiné
2017 (3)
National Championships

1st Road race
1st Time trial

1st Stage 1 Giro della Toscana
Combativity award Stage 12 Tour de France
2019
3rd Time trial, National Championships
10th Overall Arctic Race of Norway

==== Grand Tour general classification results timeline ====
Grand Tour	2007	2008	2009	2010	2011	2012	2013	2014	2015	2016	2017	2018	2019
Giro d'Italia	110	96	—	55	—	—	149	—	—	—	—	—	—
Tour de France	—	—	—	151	—	95	—	—	86	140	141	—	129
Vuelta a España	—	—	—	—	—	156	—	—	102	—	—	124	—

Legend
—	Did not compete
DNF	Did not finish

=== Track ===
2001
1st Team pursuit, National Championships
2004
2nd Team pursuit, Olympic Games
2005
1st Team pursuit, UCI World Championships
1st Team pursuit, National Championships
2006
Commonwealth Games

1st Team pursuit
3rd Individual pursuit

1st Team pursuit, National Championships
2nd Team pursuit, UCI World Championships
2007
UCI World Cup Classics

1st Team pursuit, Sydney
1st Team pursuit, Beijing
