= Émilien-Benoît Bergès =

French cyclist

Personal information
- Born: 13 January 1983 (age 43) Saint-Gaudens, France

Cycling career
- Sport: Cycling
- Current team: GSC Blagnac Vélo Sport 31
- Discipline: Road
- Role: Rider

Amateur team
- 2015-: GSC Blagnac Vélo Sport 31

Professional teams
- 2004-2005: R.A.G.T. Semences
- 2006: Auber 93
- 2007-2009: Agritubel

Émilien-Benoît Bergès (born 13 January 1983 in Saint-Gaudens) is a French road racing cyclist. His sporting career began with UV Auch. He rode for the Agritubel Pro Cycling Team during the 2007 - 2009 seasons. He took part in the road race at the 2005 Mediterranean Games, placing sixth. He started his career in 2005 with R.A.G.T. Semences. In 2006, he joined Auber 93 and Agritubel from 2007 to 2009.

== Awards ==
2003
1st Chrono Champenois
2nd Chrono des Nations
2006
1st Grand Prix de Villers-Cotterêts
2007
2nd Duo Normand
2nd Tour du Poitou-Charentes
2008
1st Stage 3 Tour of Britain
