= Daniel Fleeman =

English racing cyclist

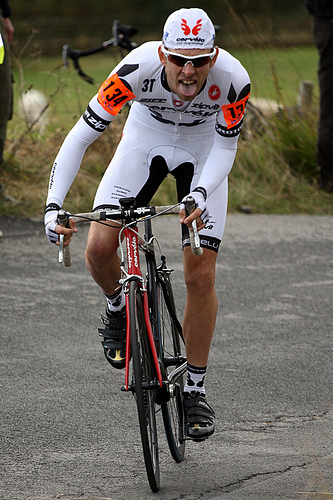
- Fleeman riding to victory at the 2009 British National Hill-Climb Championship

Personal information
- Full name: Daniel Christopher Fleeman
- Nickname: Dan
- Born: 3 October 1982 (age 44) Burton upon Trent, Staffordshire, UK
- Height: 180 cm (5 ft 11 in)
- Weight: 63–64 kg (139–141 lb)

Cycling career
- Sport: Cycling
- Current team: Retired
- Disciplines: Road; Mountain biking
- Role: Rider
- Rider type: Climber

Amateur teams
- 2013: Dig Deep Coaching–Pactimo–Cannondale
- 2014–2017: Metaltek Kuota

Professional teams
- 2007: DFL–Cyclingnews–Litespeed
- 2008: An Post–M.Donnelly–Grant Thornton–Sean Kelly
- 2009: Cervélo TestTeam
- 2010–2011: Team Raleigh

Daniel Christopher Fleeman (born 3 October 1982) is an English former racing cyclist, who rode as a professional between 2007 and 2011. He competed in the Under-23 road race at the 2004 UCI Road World Championships in Verona, Italy. In 2009 he was a member of the Cervélo TestTeam. He won the Tour des Pyrenées in 2008 with An Post–M.Donnelly–Grant Thornton–Sean Kelly. He first retired after the 2011 season.

After retiring from road racing Fleeman competed as an Elite mountain bike rider in the national XC series, riding in 2012 as an independent whilst developing his coaching business Dig Deep Coaching, and establishing his own team, Dig Deep Coaching-Pactimo-Cannondale, for 2013. Fleeman returned to the roads in 2014, and subsequently joined Metaltek Kuota, winning the Rutland – Melton International CiCLE Classic in 2017.

== Major results ==
2004
1st Road race, National Under-23 Road Championships
2005
1st Prix De La St Amour
1st Stage 3 Tour du Beaujolais
2008
1st Overall Tour des Pyrénées
7th Overall Tour of Britain
10th Overall Vuelta a Extremadura

1st Stage 1 (TTT)

2009
1st National Hill Climb Championships
2010
1st National Hill Climb Championships
7th Overall Tour des Pyrénées
7th East Midlands International CiCLE Classic
2011
3rd Richmond Grand Prix
3rd Ryedale Grand Prix
8th Overall Tour de Beauce
10th East Yorkshire Classic
2014
1st Marathon cross-country, National Mountain Bike Championships
8th Beaumont Trophy
2015
7th Ryedale Grand Prix
2016
3rd Evesham Vale Road Race
7th Ryedale Grand Prix
9th Rutland–Melton International CiCLE Classic
2017
1st Rutland–Melton International CiCLE Classic
