= Kristof Goddaert =

Belgian cyclist

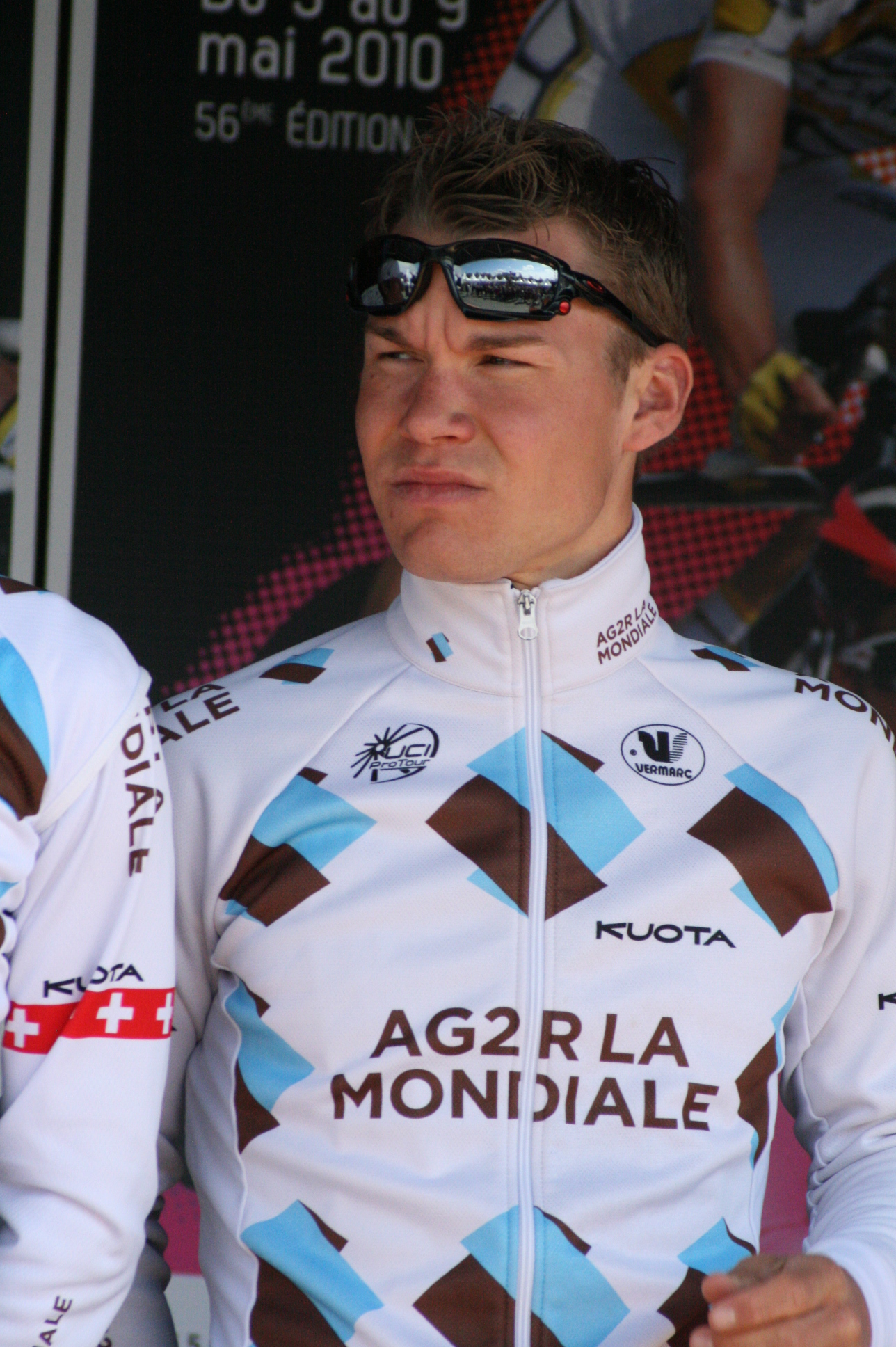
- Goddaert at 2010 Four Days of Dunkirk

Personal information
- Full name: Kristof Goddaert
- Born: 21 November 1986 Sint Niklaas, Belgium
- Died: 18 February 2014 (aged 27) Antwerp, Belgium
- Height: 1.82 m (5 ft 11 1/2 in)
- Weight: 72 kg (159 lb)

Cycling career
- Sport: Cycling
- Discipline: Road
- Role: Rider
- Rider type: One-day rider

Amateur teams
- 2005–2006: Diametal-Colnago
- 2006: Pictoflex Bikeland Hyundai (stagiaire)
- 2007: Davitamon–Win for Life–Jong Vlaanderen

Professional teams
- 2008–2009: Topsport Vlaanderen
- 2010–2012: Ag2r–La Mondiale
- 2013–2014: IAM Cycling

Kristof Goddaert (21 November 1986 – 18 February 2014) was a Belgian road racing cyclist who competed as a professional between 2008 and 2014 for the Topsport Vlaanderen–Mercator, Ag2r–La Mondiale and IAM Cycling squads.

Born in Sint Niklaas, Belgium, Goddaert left Ag2r–La Mondiale at the end of the 2012 season, and joined the new IAM Cycling team for the 2013 season.

On 18 February 2014, Goddaert was killed during a training ride in Antwerp, when he fell from his bike and was struck by a De Lijn bus.

== Major results ==
2007
3rd Nationale Sluitingsprijs
2008
2nd Tour de Vendée
4th Omloop van de Vlaamse Scheldeboorden
5th Memorial Rik Van Steenbergen
9th Paris–Tours
2009
3rd Paris–Brussels
7th Memorial Rik Van Steenbergen
7th Munsterland Giro
7th Omloop van het Houtland
2010
1st Stage 3 Tour de Wallonie
5th Le Samyn
2011
8th Gent–Wevelgem
2012
2nd Road race, National Road Championships
5th Tro Bro Leon
7th Halle–Ingooigem
2013
7th Grote Prijs Wase Polders
8th Overall Tour de l'Eurometropole
