= Bowden baronets =

Baronetcy in the Baronetage of the United Kingdom

The Bowden Baronetcy, of the City of Nottingham is a title in the Baronetage of the United Kingdom. It was created on 23 June 1915 for Frank Bowden, founder of the Raleigh Bicycle Company. As of 2007 the title is held by his great-grandson, the fourth Baronet, who succeeded his father in 2001.

== Bowden baronets, of the City of Nottingham (1915) ==
- Sir Frank Bowden, 1st Baronet (1848–1921)
- Sir Harold Bowden, 2nd Baronet (1880–1960)
- Sir Frank Houston Bowden, 3rd Baronet (1909–2001)
- Sir Nicholas Richard Bowden, 4th Baronet (born 1935)

The heir presumptive is the present holder's nephew Alexander Gordon Houston Bowden (born 1972).
