= Strika =

Strika may refer to

- Strika (Transformers), a character from the Transformers: Beast Wars franchise
- Raleigh Strika, a children's bicycle manufactured between 1976 and 1983 in England
- Roko Strika (born 1994), Australian association football midfielder
