= Raleigh Grifter =

English children's bicycle model

The Raleigh Grifter is a children's bicycle manufactured and marketed between 1976 and early 1983 by the Raleigh Bicycle Company of Nottingham, England. It was the "must have" bicycle of its time and bridged a gap between the motorcycle-styled Raleigh Chopper and the Raleigh Burner BMX models. Its frame was very similar to the Raleigh Twenty Shopper bicycle, but with a front triangle which resembled an upside down Chopper frame. It was part of a range of age-specific bicycles and was positioned at the top of that range. The smallest in the range was the Raleigh Boxer with the Raleigh Strika in the middle.

The Grifter was released six years before the first Raleigh BMX bike exploded on the market in 1982, and discontinued in 1983 after new models such as the XL and Super Grifter with more modern and visually attractive styling were introduced to keep interest in the range. As with its contemporary, the Raleigh Bomber, the Grifter has in recent years grown in stature in the enthusiasts/collectors circle. Original Mk1 examples are prized and in particular, "pre production" examples from the first half of 1976 together with the "end of line" special editions from 1983.

== MK1 ==
The MK1 Grifter dates back to May 1976, although this pre-mass production version of the bike is quite rare (frame numbers starting with NG6). Main production started in June 1976 and continued until 1979. The MK1 changed slightly as production progressed, there are a few differences between the earliest and later MK1 Grifters. The early pre-mass production models had Super MX tyres instead of the Supergrips and skinny handlebar foam.

The MK1 came in either Metallic Blue or Metallic Red, although the earliest Grifters were mainly blue. It is now known that the later MK1 models were more of a bronzy red rather than the original candy apple red. The Grifter featured a 3-speed Sturmey Archer hub gear controlled by a handlebar-mounted twist grip which became notorious for its second gear, which seemed to have a habit of momentarily losing transmission to the rear wheel. In reality, this was due to a poorly adjusted cable. The Twist Grip control unit required a different method of cable adjustment to the norm, and it was the normal method of adjustment that resulted in a slightly slack cable and a slipping second gear. The outcome of this was rapid and painful contact between one's knee and the giant oversized bolts on the headset.

Raleigh also produced the MK1 for export around the world with some slight changes to the model such as chain guards and decals. These export models have now become very rare and very collectible.

== MK2 ==
Raleigh produced the MK2 Grifter between 1978 and 1983 (but there have been replacement frames found as late as 1984). Originally available in blue or red variants, then later together with updated models, the Mk2 was available in seven various models:- Flame Red, Blaze Blue, Silver, XL, GS, Black and Gold Super Grifter and Silver and Blue Super Grifter. The MK2 also featured a longer rear mudguard.

== Discontinuation ==
Although the Grifter range continued (and expanded) despite the introduction of the Burner BMX range in 1982, the huge popularity of BMX saw the Grifters target market riding a Burner instead. By 1983 a Grifter was a rare sight on the street, with some even being converted to resemble a BMX by their riders. The model was out of fashion and Raleigh pulled the plug on the Grifter that year.

== See also ==
- List of bicycle manufacturers
- List of bicycle part manufacturers
