= Raleigh Strika =

Children's bicycle

The Raleigh Strika was a children's bicycle manufactured between 1976 and 1983 by the Raleigh Bicycle Company of Nottingham, England. It was part of the Action Bikes range, smaller in size than the Grifter but larger than the Boxer, with frame dimensions designed to accommodate 6 to 10 year olds.

== Design and styling ==
The frame styling of the Strika visually resembles a BMX although it was probably intended to resemble a motorbike. The most notable features are the imitation front suspension forks and the chunky padded saddle. The Strika was heavy compared to a similar size BMX and reputed to have ungainly handling qualities for stunt riding.

Early models of the Strika were fitted with a back pedal brake in addition to hand brakes. This feature was omitted from later models manufactured after approximately 1978. Known production colours are flame red, lime green, black, and silver.

In 1980 the Strika was complemented by the Strika XL which differed only by having a yellow frame and blue tyres, and a saddle identical to that later used on the Mini Burner.

== Successors ==
The Strika was replaced by the Burner and Mini Burner in the 1980s although the Raleigh brochures from 1982 and 1983 show both the Strika and the Strika XL being sold alongside the Burner. In the late 1990s, Raleigh released the Dirt Cross with a frame styling and design similar to that of the Strika.
