= Raleigh Dirt Cross =

The Raleigh Dirt Cross was a children's bicycle manufactured from 1996-1999 by the Raleigh Bicycle Company of Nottingham, England.

== Design and styling ==
The Dirt Cross was very unusual design and is best described as a hybrid of a Grifter and a mountain bike. It was fitted with 20 and 24 inch wheels, and the styling of the handlebars and frame were similar to those of a BMX, with dimensions designed to accommodate 6 to 10 year olds. The Dirt Cross was fitted with 5 or 10 speed Shimano gears and a twist-grip gear controller as standard. It is possible that the design was influenced by the Raleigh Grifter, Strika and Boxer as the bikes were fitted with imitation front suspension forks. Although children's bikes with functional suspension forks were available from Raleigh during the late 1990s, those fitted to Dirt Cross were purely cosmetic. The bikes came in the colours green, red and silver.

== Advertising ==
Television and poster advertisements for the Dirt Cross featured the Nottingham Forest defender Stuart Pearce . The Dirt Cross was the first children's bike to be advertised by Raleigh using a multimedia application complete with MPEG video clips running on interactive public information kiosks.

Despite the rather high profile marketing campaign, sales of the Dirt Cross appear to be quite low. Production ceased in 1999 with no similar replacement model.

== Go Kart ==
The Dirt Cross title was later used on a children's Go Kart from Raleigh which is still on sale in 2009.
