= Harold Bowden =

British-American businessman

Sir Harold Bowden Bt GBE
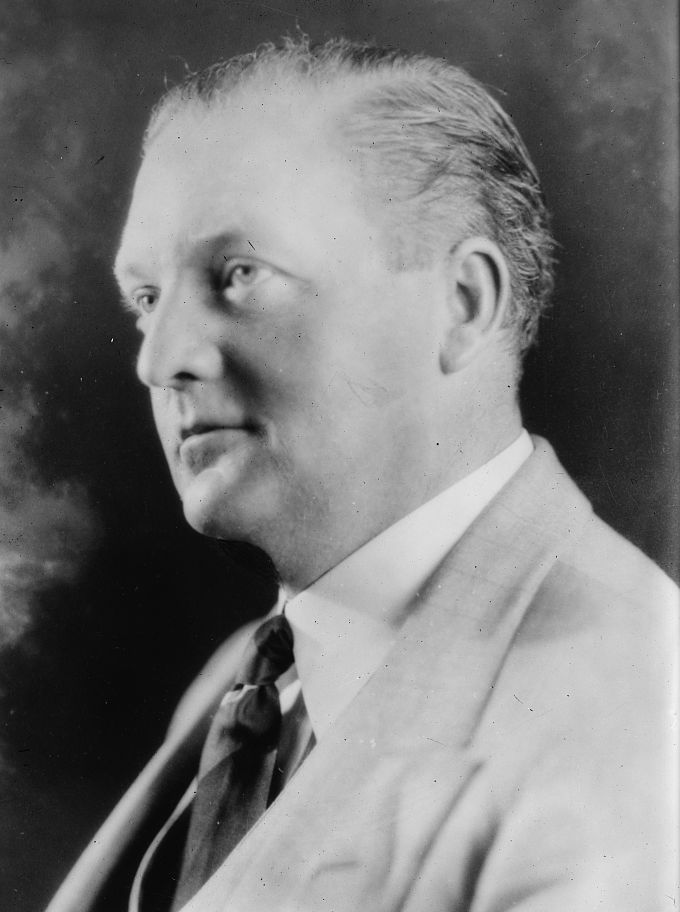
- Sir Harold Bowden

Chairman and Managing Director of Raleigh Bicycle Company and Sturmey-Archer
- In office 1921-1938

Chairman of the British Olympic Association
- In office 1930-1934

High Sheriff of Nottinghamshire
- In office 1933

Personal details
- Born: 9 July 1880 San Francisco, California, U.S.
- Died: 24 August 1960 (aged 80) Winchester, England
- Spouse(s): Vera Whitaker (m. 1908; div. 1919) Muriel Ker-Douglas (m. 1920; died 1952) June McKay (m. 1952) Valerie Came (m. 1957)
- Children: 2
- Parent: Frank Bowden (father)
- Education: Clare College, Cambridge

Sir Harold Bowden, 2nd Baronet (9 July 1880 – 24 August 1960) was the chairman and chief executive of the Raleigh Bicycle Company and Sturmey-Archer Ltd from his father's death in 1921 until his own retirement in 1938. He also served as President of the British Cycle and Motor-Cycle Manufacturers and Trader Union, President of the Motor and Cycle Trades Benevolent Fund, and Chairman of the British Olympic Association for the 1932 Summer Olympic Games in Los Angeles.

His achievements were celebrated in 1938 when Cycling Weekly awarded him his own page in the Golden Book of Cycling, which is now held in 'The Pedal Club' archive.

== Personal life ==
Sir Harold was the son of international business tycoon Sir Frank Bowden, 1st Baronet and Amelia Frances Houston, daughter of Colonel Alexander Houston of California. Born in San Francisco, U.S., the fifth of six children, he had four older sisters and a younger brother. He was educated at Clifton College, Bristol, and at Clare College, Cambridge. Harold variously lived at 'Beeston Fields' manor house, Beeston, 'Ruddington Grange' and 'South Manor House' at Ruddington.

Harold was a keen cyclist and oarsman, and a member of the Pickwick Bicycle Club, founded in 1870. It is now self-proclaimed as the 'oldest surviving bicycle club in the world' although now predominantly a luncheon club.

On 11 May 1916 he purchased a new Brough motorcycle, registration AL 4659. It was a 500cc model 'H', which he sold on 22 February 1919.

Harold Bowden married four times. He married Vera Whitaker, daughter of Joseph Whitaker of Mansfield, on 7 July 1908, and they had two children, Frank Houston Bowden and Ruth Bowden before they divorced in 1919. He was married to his second wife Muriel Smythe Ker-Douglas, daughter of William Ker-Douglas, from 18 January 1920 until her death in 1952. He married thirdly, June Bowden MacKay, daughter of Thomas Henry MacKay, on 4 November 1952. He married his fourth wife, Valerie Raymont Came, daughter of Richard Raymont Came, on 11 February 1957.

Sir Harold succeeded to the baronetcy on the death of his father in 1921 and eight years later he was created a Knight Grand Cross, Order of the British Empire (G.B.E.).

He was decorated with the award of Grand Cross, Order of the Phoenix of Greece.

He died in Winchester, England after a short illness.

== Career ==
=== Raleigh Bicycles ===
Sir Frank Bowden founded the Raleigh Bicycle Company in 1887 in Nottingham, and Harold became chairman and managing director on the death of his father in 1921, a position he then held for 17 years. He was also chairman of Sturmey-Archer Gears Ltd which had been taken over by his father in 1902. Under Harold's leadership Raleigh continued to lead the industry, introduced many further innovations and acquired other well-known cycle companies such as: Humber (1932), Rudge-Whitworth, BSA and Triumph. Raleigh also manufactured motorcycles and the Safety Seven car from 1932 to 1937. By his retirement in 1938 production was 60,000 cycles per year from a works site that occupied 20 acres.

=== Service appointments ===
He was elected as President of the British Cycle & Motor Cycle Manufacturers' & Trader' Union on two occasions, holding office from 1921 to 1923.

He was President of the Motor and Cycle Trades Benevolent Fund from 1924 to 1926 and the 1925 Banquet, attended by the Prince of Wales, raised a record sum of £10,000.

In 1929 he was invested as a Knight Grand Cross of the Order of the British Empire (GBE).

He was appointed to the office of High Sheriff of Nottinghamshire in 1933.

He served as vice-president of the Federation of British Industries.

=== 1932 Olympics ===
From 1930–34 he served as Chairman of the British Olympic Association, raising over £10,000 to take the British team to Los Angeles for the 1932 Summer Olympic Games. He accompanied the team to America for the games.

The Rotarian magazine of October 1932 reports that Bowden was quoted in the Los Angeles Times saying :

... Everything has been extraordinarily well managed. I think a better spirit of real sportsmanship has reigned here than at any Olympics since 1896. ... I know that we British return home with a glow of good feeling .... It will be increasingly difficult for misguided politicians to lead any nation into war after this. Sir Harold Bowden.

The Sydney Morning Herald on Friday 10 March 1933 reported that whilst presiding at an Olympic dinner in London, Bowden stated that ... whatever may be felt about the shortcomings of the League of Nations, the progress of international sport should create optimism concerning the League.

=== The Golden Book ===
Sir Harold Bowden's achievements were celebrated in 1938 when Cycling Weekly awarded him his own page in the Golden Book of Cycling.

Baronetage of the United Kingdom
Preceded by Frank Bowden	Baronet (of the City of Nottingham); 1921–1960	Succeeded by Frank Houston Bowden
