= Sir Frank Bowden, 1st Baronet =

British businessman and inventor (1848 - 1921)

Sir Frank Bowden Bt JP FRGS
- Born: 30 January 1848; Devon, England
- Died: 25 April 1921 (aged 73)
- Occupations: Businessman, inventor
- Known for: Founding the Raleigh Bicycle Company
- Spouse: Amelia Houston (m. 1879)
- Children: 6, including Harold

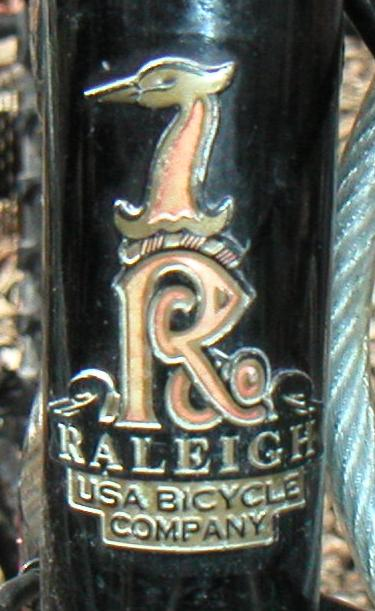
Raleigh US head badge

Sir Frank Bowden, 1st Baronet, JP, FRGS (30 January 1848 – 25 April 1921) was a British businessman and inventor. He was a founder of the Raleigh Bicycle Company.

== Biography ==
Frank Bowden was born in Devon, England, and made a fortune in property development in Hong Kong in the 1870s. In 1879, he married Amelia Frances, an American heiress. When he returned from Hong Kong he was seriously ill and his doctor gave him six months to live. Bowden took up cycling on his doctor's advice and bought a bicycle from a small shop on Raleigh Street, Nottingham, run by Messrs Woodhead, Angois and Ellis. He was so impressed with his recovering health and the bicycle that in 1887–88 he acquired control of the company, which was then making three bicycles a week. Production rose, and three years later Bowden needed a bigger workshop, which he found in a four-storey building in Russell Street. He changed the company's name to Raleigh Cycles to commemorate the original address. By 1896 it was the largest bicycle manufacturer in the world and occupied seven and a half acres in Faraday Road, Nottingham. He lived at The Ropewalk, Nottingham.

Raleigh advert from 1940.

He also helped build up Sturmey Archer Gears.

He wrote Cycling for Health and Points For Cyclists in 1913. In 1915 he was created a baronet of the City of Nottingham. He became a Fellow of the Royal Geographical Society and a Justice of the Peace.

== Family ==
Bowden married Amelia Frances, daughter of Colonel Alexander Houston, of California, on 17 September 1879. The couple had six children: Helen, Winifred, Caroline, Sylvia, Harold and Claud.

== Death ==
Sir Frank died in April 1921, aged 73, and was succeeded in the baronetcy by his eldest son Sir Harold Bowden, 2nd Baronet who ran Raleigh for the next 17 years and became President of the British Cycle and Motor-Cycle Manufacturers and Trader Union. Lady Bowden died in 1937.

== See also ==
- Bowden cable

== Notes ==
Baronetage of the United Kingdom
New creation	Baronet (of the City of Nottingham); 1915–1921	Succeeded by Harold Bowden
