= Raleigh Winkie =

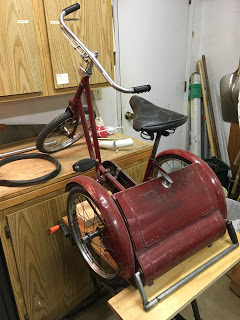
170805Betsy

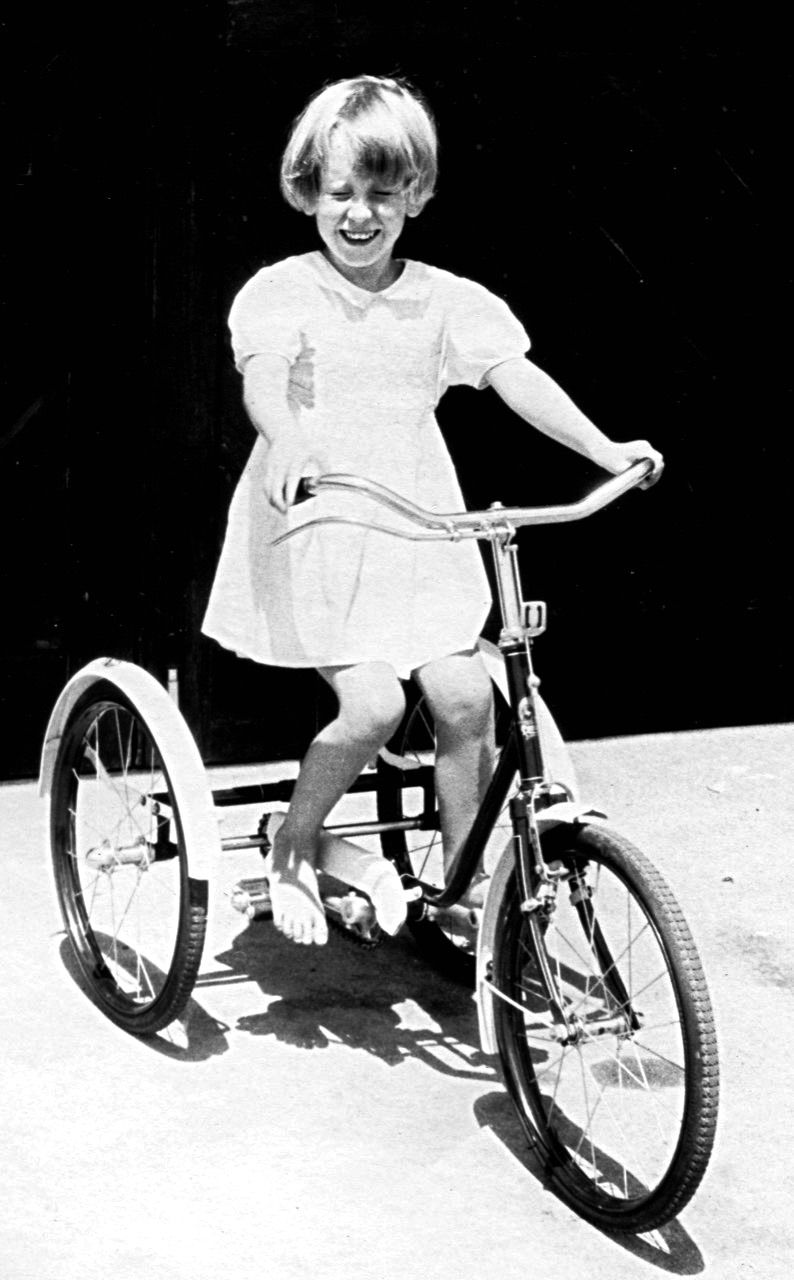
Young girl with new Raleigh tricycle,1953, Port of Spain.

The Winkie was a rear chain driven children's tricycle manufactured in England by Raleigh Bicycles between 1950 and 1970. Raleigh marketed the tricycle to children by having them automatically join an owners club called The Circle of Silver Knights which taught traffic safety while also acting as a way to sell tricycles. The construction is welded steel tube with steel wheels and a single speed driven by a chain attached to a solid rear axle.
