= H.E.L.P. International =

British charitable organization

Health, Education, Literacy Programme (H.E.L.P.) International is a charitable organisation registered in the United Kingdom. H.E.L.P. International was founded in October 2003 as a merger of charities working in Zimbabwe and India from 1992. As of June 2004, H.E.L.P. International has projects, and is a registered charity, in four countries: India, Zimbabwe, Zambia and the UK.

Its mission is to provide care for destitute or disadvantaged children through formal schooling and acquisition of necessary life skills and to assist adults with acquiring life skills that empower them to increase their self-sufficiency within their communities.

== See also ==
- The Fun Zimbabwe Ride 2009
