= Raleigh Bomber =

Bicycle model

The Raleigh Bomber was a bicycle aimed at the boys/youth market which first appeared in 1981. The Bomber had wide balloon tyres, a low slung frame and a sprung saddle with wide "cowhorn" style handlebars in the general style of a "cruiser" bicycle.

== Concept ==
The Bomber was visually based on the American "clunkers", a homemade style of bicycle used on a Californian downhill course known as Repack during the late 1970s. These bicycles were fitted with wide tyres, wide motorcycle handlebars and a rear coaster (back pedal) brake. (The name Repack came from the need to repack the rear hub with grease after a downhill run). Many of the original riders of this course became the big early names in what became the genre of Mountain Bikes. Meanwhile in the UK, another homemade genre known as the Tracker (or Cruiser) was popular. But owing to the lack of low slung frames and wide tyres, the UK bikes were adapted from old "sit up and beg" roadsters or road bikes. As a result, they had a less agricultural appearance, but were essentially of the same ilk. Indeed, this style of bicycle and rough, technically difficult, off road riding had been featured on television in England as early as 1961, when the Darlington "Bogwheelers" were interviewed by the BBC complete with their homemade bikes. It is therefore perhaps surprising that Raleigh took as long as they did to consider making their own version of these bicycles for the UK market. The prototypes included the 1980 Cruiser, which had the basic Bomber frame that Raleigh had created from two of their old designs, the rear half of which was from an old Nigerian roadster. This prototype was fitted with the typically slim UK tyres but the eventual Raleigh Bomber was shod with huge 26 x 2 1/4" tyres, on virtually unheard of 559mm rims. These wheels would soon become the standard for Mountain Bikes which would sweep Britain a few years later. However, Raleigh decided not to fit a rear coaster brake to the Bomber which was a popular American standard but a very rare fitment in the UK. Instead it had either a single speed or Sturmey Archer 3 speed hub. It was also fitted with the Chainset from the Grifter and other generic Raleigh items like brakes and pedals. The Bomber was successful enough to soon be accompanied by a Super Bomber version and later a 5 speed derailleur geared model. However, Raleigh discontinued the Bomber range in favour of the new Maverick Mountain Bike model in 1985.
