= Raleigh Bicycle Company =

British bicycle manufacturer

Coordinates: 53.0124°N 1.3138°W

- Type: Private company limited by shares
- Industry: Bicycles
- Predecessor: Woodhead and Angois (1885, later Woodhead, Angois and Ellis)
- Founded: December 1888; 137 years ago, registered as a limited liability company in January 1889
- Founders: Frank Bowden, Richard Woodhead and Paul Angois
- Fate: Owned by Accell
- Headquarters: Eastwood, Nottinghamshire, United Kingdom
- Website: raleigh.co.uk

The Raleigh Bicycle Company is a British bicycle brand based in Nottingham, England, and founded by Woodhead and Angois in 1885. Using Raleigh as their brand name, it is one of the oldest bicycle companies in the world. After being acquired by Frank Bowden in December 1888, it became The Raleigh Cycle Company, which was registered as a limited liability company in January 1889. By 1913, it was the largest bicycle manufacturing company in the world. From 1921 to 1935, Raleigh also produced motorcycles and three-wheel cars, leading to the formation of Reliant Motors.

Raleigh bicycle is now a brand owned by the Dutch bicycle group Accell which it uses in Europe and licences out in other territories including to Canadian Tire in Canada and Suncross in India. Design and manufacturing no longer take place in the UK. In August 2026, Accell began insolvency proceedings.

In 2006, the Raleigh Chopper was named in the list of British design icons in the Great British Design Quest organised by the BBC and the Design Museum.

== History ==
=== Early years ===
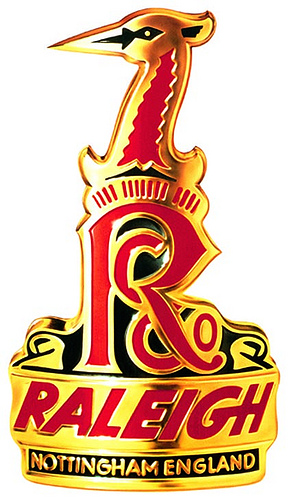
Raleigh's heron head badge

The history of Raleigh bicycles started in 1885, when Richard Morriss Woodhead from Sherwood Forest, and Paul Eugene Louis Angois, a French citizen, set up a small bicycle workshop in Raleigh Street, Nottingham, England. In the spring of that year, they started advertising in the local press. The Nottinghamshire Guardian of 15 May 1885 printed what was possibly the first Woodhead and Angois classified advertisement.

Raleigh advert from 1940

Nearly two years later, the 11 April 1887 issue of the Nottingham Post contained a display advertisement for the Raleigh 'Safety' model under the new banner 'Woodhead, Angois, and Ellis. Russell Street Cycle Works.' William Ellis had recently joined the partnership and provided much-needed financial investment. Like Woodhead and Angois, Ellis's background was in the lace industry. He was a lace gasser, a service provider involved in the bleaching and treating of lace, with premises in nearby Clare Street and Glasshouse Street. Thanks to Ellis, the bicycle works had now expanded round the corner from Raleigh Street into former lace works on the adjoining road, Russell Street. By 1888, the company was making about three cycles a week and employed around half a dozen men. It was one of 15 bicycle manufacturers based in Nottingham at that time.

Frank Bowden, a recent convert to cycling who on medical advice had toured extensively on a tricycle, first saw a Raleigh bicycle in a shop window in Queen Victoria Street, London, about the time that William Ellis's investment in the cycle workshop was beginning to take effect. Bowden described how this led to him visiting the Raleigh works:

In the early part of 1887, while looking for a good specimen of the then new safety bicycle, I came across a Raleigh in London. Its patent changeable gear and other special features struck me as superior to all the others I had seen, and I purchased one upon which I toured extensively through France, Italy and England during 1887 and 1888. In the autumn of the latter year, happening to pass through Nottingham, and with the idea of, if possible, getting a still more up-to-date machine, I called upon Messrs. Woodhead and Angois, the originators and makers of the Raleigh …

It is clear from Frank Bowden's own account that, although he bought a Raleigh 'Safety' in 1887, he did not visit the Raleigh workshop until autumn 1888. That visit led to Bowden replacing Ellis as the partnership's principal investor, though Bowden did not become the outright owner of the firm. He concluded that the company had a profitable future if it promoted its innovative features, increased its output, cut its overhead costs and tailored its products to the individual tastes and preferences of its customers. He bought out William Ellis's share in the firm and was allotted 5,000 £1 shares, while Woodhead and Angois between them held another 5,000 shares.

In Frank Bowden's own lifetime, Raleigh publicity material stated that the firm was founded in 1888, which was when Bowden, as he himself confirmed, first bought into the enterprise. Thus, Raleigh's 30th anniversary was celebrated in 1918. The 1888 foundation date is confirmed by Bowden's great-grandson, Gregory Houston Bowden, who states that Frank Bowden "began to negotiate with Woodhead and Angois and in December 1888 founded 'The Raleigh Cycle Company'." The December 1888 foundation date is also confirmed by Nottinghamshire Archives. In recent years, the Raleigh company has cited 1887 as a foundation date but, whilst this pre-dates Bowden's involvement, the Raleigh brand name was created by Woodhead and Angois and the enterprise can, as demonstrated above, be traced back to 1885.

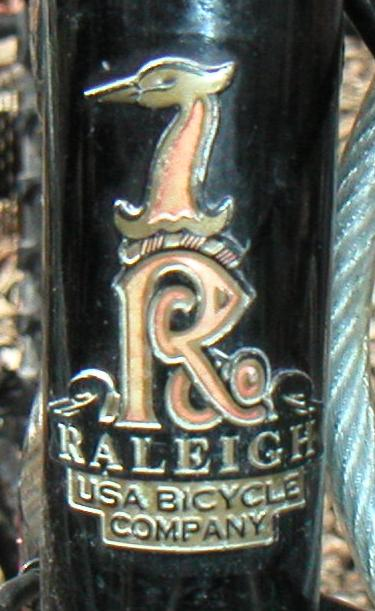
Raleigh USA head badge

The company established by Bowden in December 1888 was still privately owned with unlimited public liability. In January 1889, it became the first of a series of limited liability companies with Raleigh in its name. It had a nominal capital of £20,000, half of which was provided by Frank Bowden. Paul Angois was appointed director responsible for product design, Richard Woodhead was made director responsible for factory management, and Frank Bowden became chairman and managing director. Some shares were made available to small investors and local businessmen, but take-up was minimal, and Bowden ended up buying most of the public shares. He subsequently supplied virtually all the capital needed to expand the firm.

When Frank Bowden got involved with the enterprise, the works comprised three small workshops and a greenhouse. As Woodhead, Angois and Ellis, the firm had expanded round the corner from Raleigh Street into Russell Street, where also stood Clarke's five-storey former lace factory. To enable further expansion of the business, Bowden financed the renting of this property and installation of new machinery.

Under Bowden's guidance, Raleigh expanded rapidly. By 1891, the company occupied not only Clarke's factory but also Woodroffe's Factory and Russell Street Mills. In November 1892, Raleigh signed a tenancy agreement for rooms in Butler's factory on the other side of Russell Street. Shortly after this, the company also occupied Forest Road Mill. (Forest Road junctions with Russell Street at the opposite end from Raleigh Street.)

The classic Raleigh Cycle Company heron logo

Bowden created a business which, by 1913, was the biggest bicycle manufacturing company in the world, occupying seven and a half acres in purpose-built premises completed in 1897 at Faraday Road, Lenton, Nottingham. It subsequently became very much bigger. Many say that Bowden invented the Bowden cable but there is no evidence to support this myth.

Sir Frank Bowden died in 1921 and his son Sir Harold Bowden, 2nd Baronet took over as chairman and chief executive, guiding the company through the next 17 years of expansion.

In 1931 their new headquarters in the Howitt Building on Lenton Boulevard was complete. This building was designed by Thomas Cecil Howitt and won a RIBA Bronze Medal. In 2018 the building was Grade II listed.

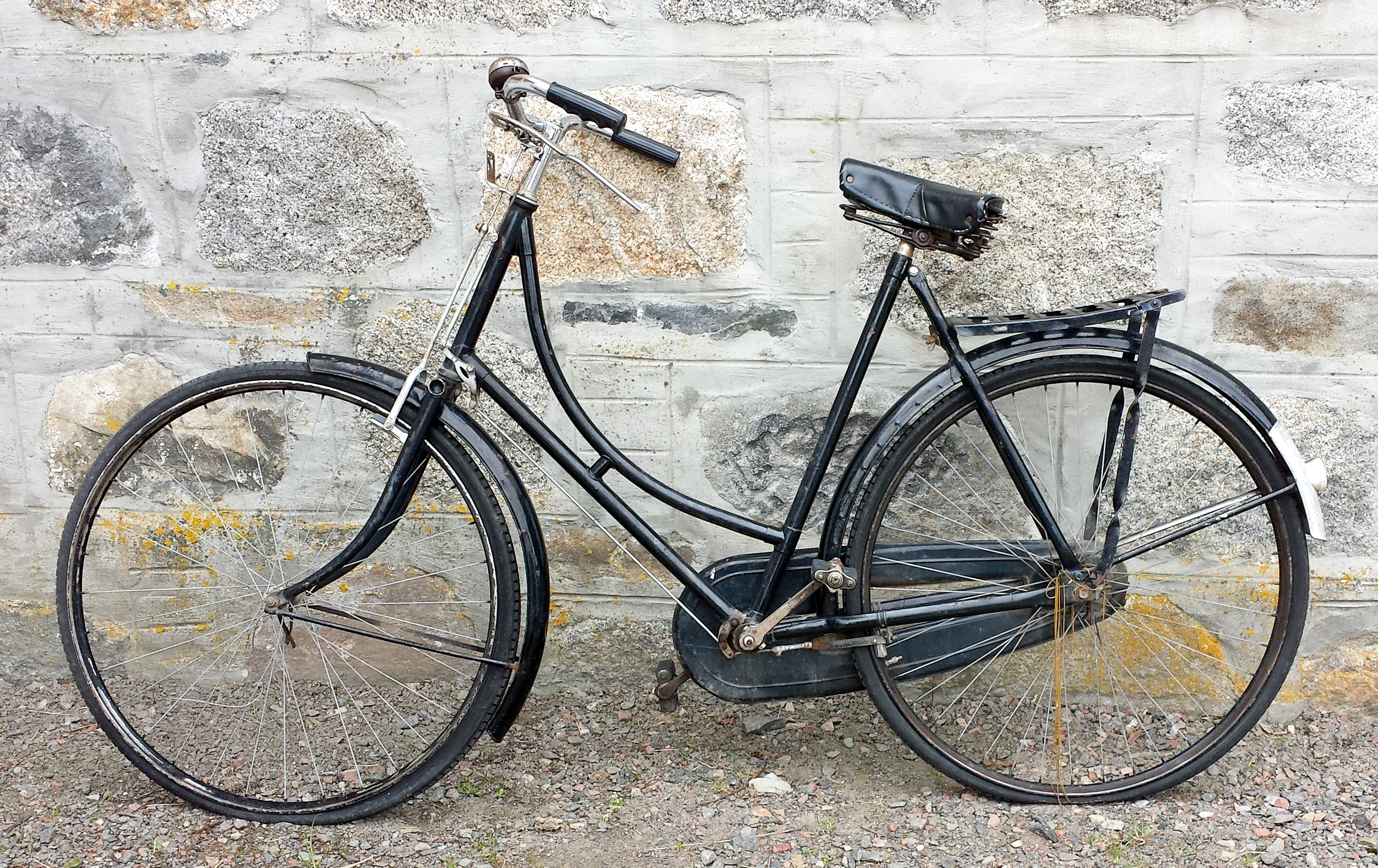
1930s Raleigh lady's loop frame bicycle

==== Humber Cycles ====
There was a resurgence in domestic and export demand for pedal bicycles and by February 1932 Raleigh had acquired all the Humber Limited trade marks. Manufacture was transferred to Raleigh's Nottingham works. Raleigh-made Humbers differed from Raleighs only in chainwheels, fork crowns and some brakework.

During World War II, the Raleigh factory in Nottingham was used for the production of fuzes. Bicycle production was reduced to approximately 5% of its peacetime capacity.

In 1939, Raleigh opened a bicycle factory at 6 Hanover Quay, Dublin, Ireland and commenced bicycle production there. The Raleigh (Ireland) business expanded and moved to 8–11 Hanover Quay, Dublin in 1943. The plant produced complete bicycles and Sturmey-Archer hubs, and remained in production until 1976, when the factory burned down. Models produced there latterly were the Chopper and Triumph 20. The head badges changed in the late 1960s, possibly after the passing of the Trade Descriptions Act 1968 in the UK. Dublin-made machines no longer had "Nottingham England" on the Heron or Triumph head badge, the panel being left blank instead.

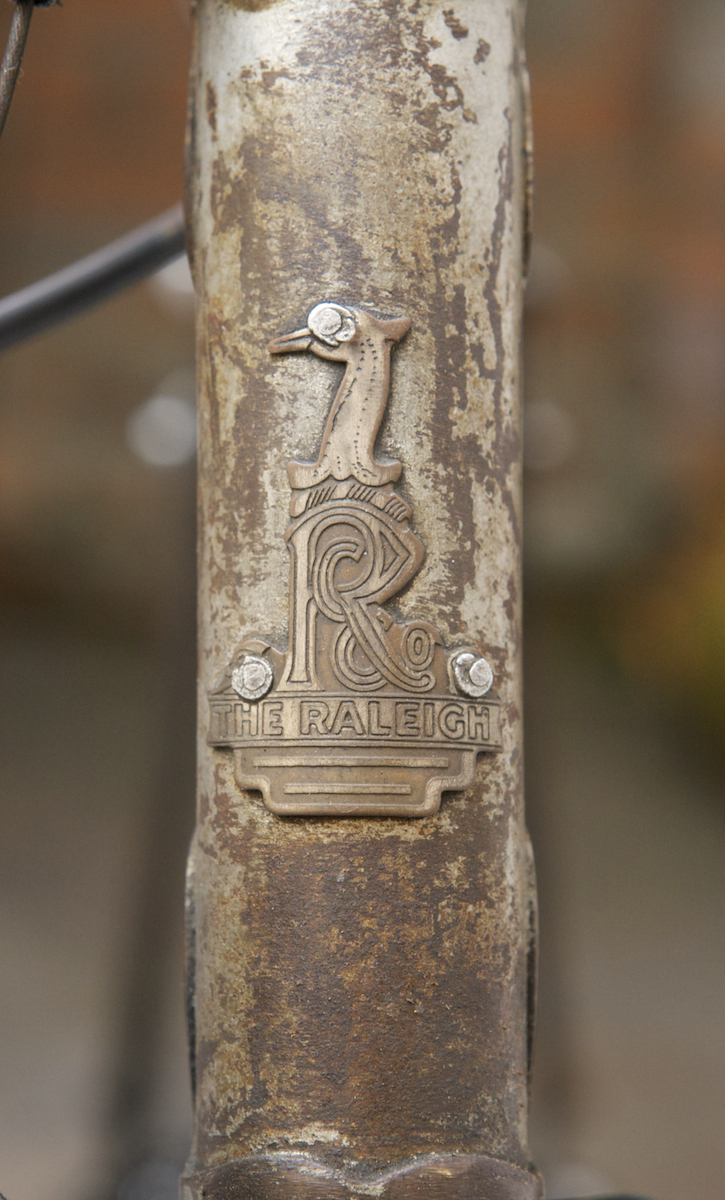
Irish Raleigh Heron Badge

=== Motor vehicles ===
In 1899, Raleigh started to build motorcycles and in 1903, introduced the Raleighette, a belt-driven three-wheel motorcycle with the driver in the back and a wicker seat for the passenger between the two front wheels. Financial losses meant production lasted only until 1908.

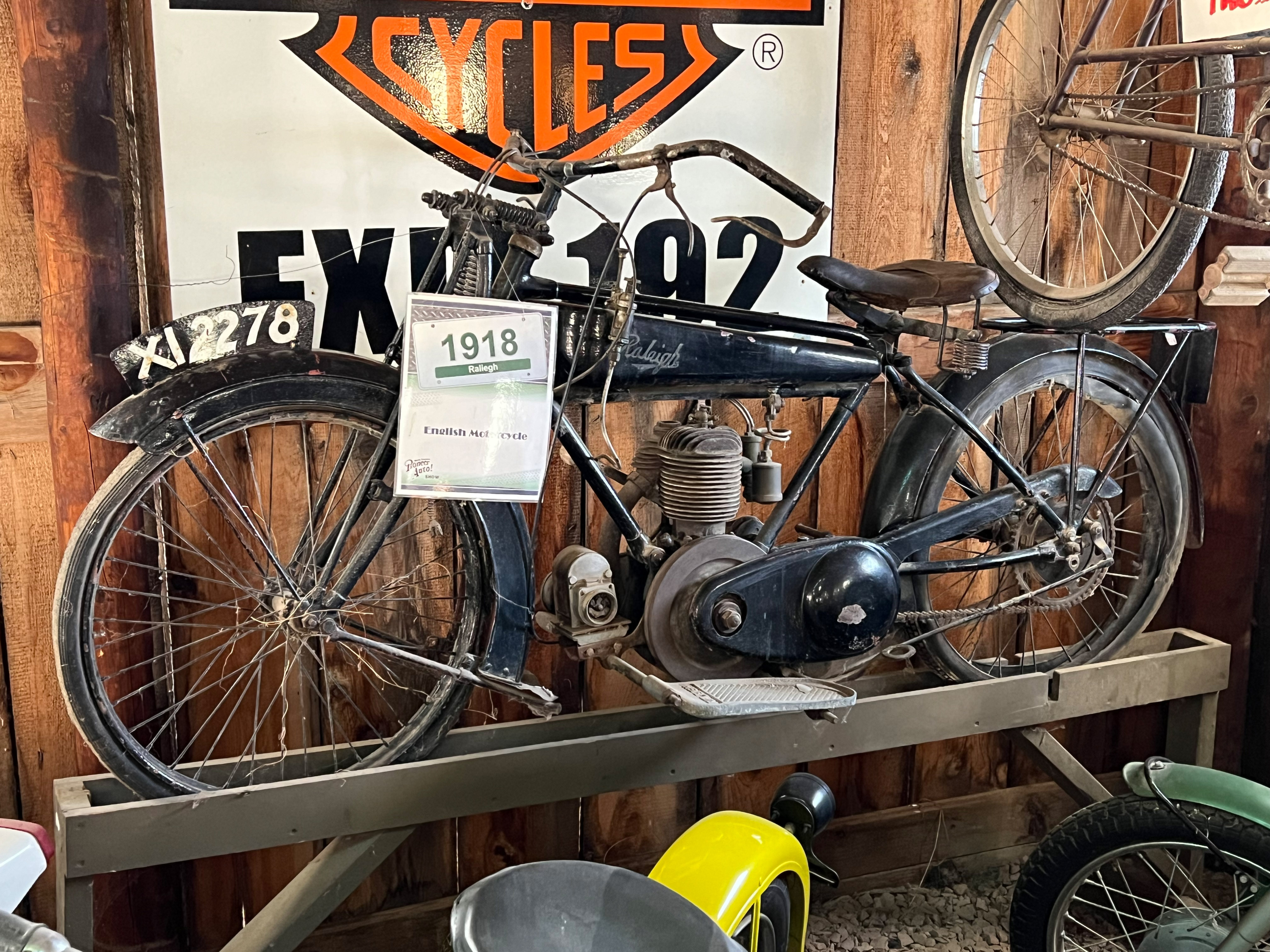
1918 Raleigh motorcycle on display at the Pioneer Auto Museum, Murdo, South Dakota

In 1930, the company acquired the rights to the Ivy Karryall, a motor tricycle fitted with a cabin for cargo and a hood for the driver. Raleigh's version was called the Light Delivery Van and had a chain drive. A two-passenger version was followed by Raleigh's first three-wheel car, the Safety Seven. It was a four-seat convertible with shaft drive and a maximum speed of 55 mph (89 km/h). A saloon version was planned, but Raleigh shut its motor department to concentrate on bicycles again. Chief designer T. L. Williams took the equipment and remaining parts and moved to Tamworth, where his company produced three-wheelers for 65 years. The leftover parts from Raleigh carried an "R", so Williams chose a matching name: Reliant.

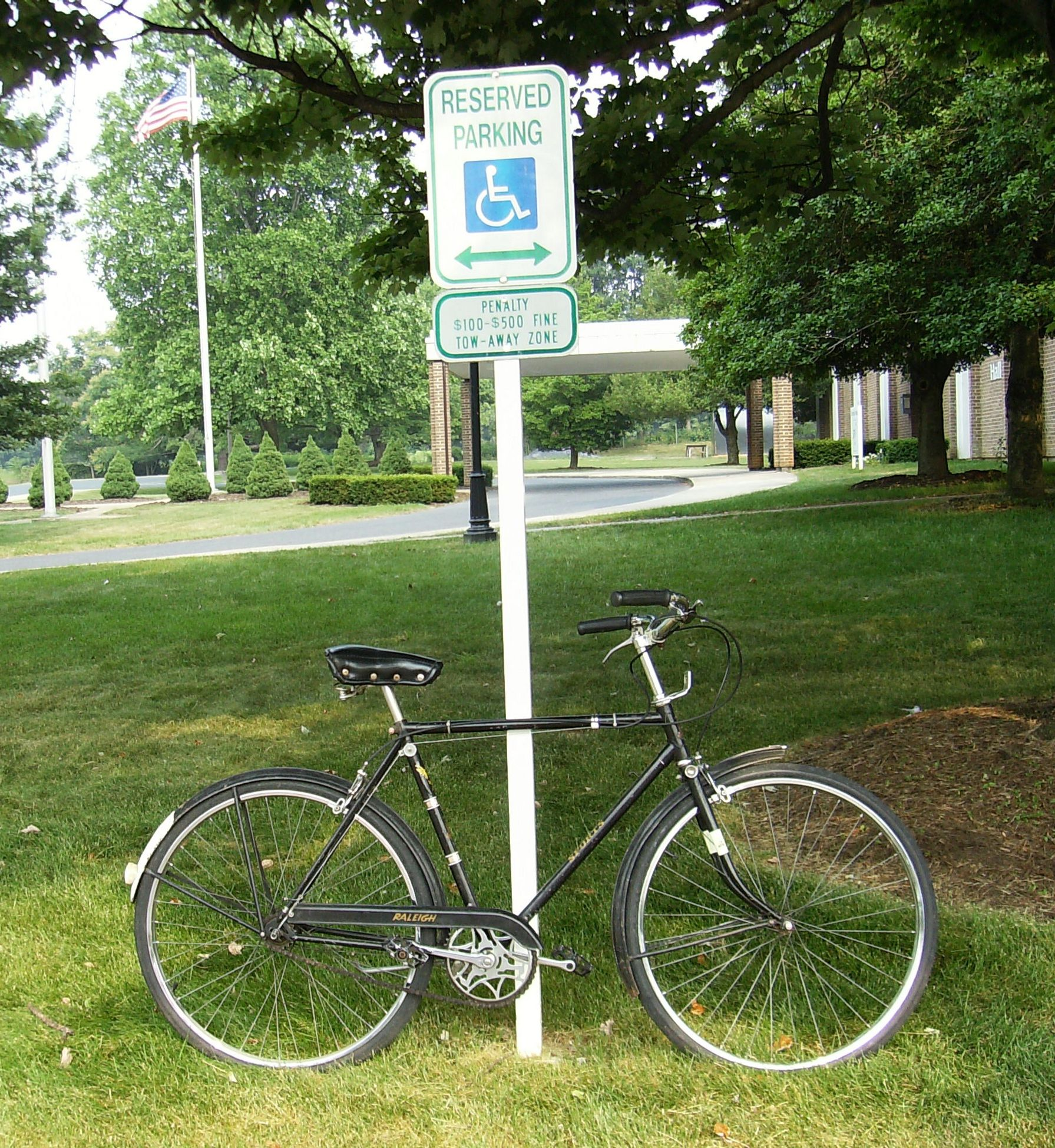
1970 Raleigh Sports in the US

Raleigh also made mopeds in the late 1950s and 1960s as the bicycle market declined. The most popular of which was the RM6 Runabout. This model featured unsprung front forks and a cycle type calliper front brake which made it a very affordable mode of transport. Because of its success, production continued until February 1971; 17 months after Raleigh had stopped manufacturing all other mopeds.

With the surge in scooter ownership in the UK, Raleigh built a small Italian scooter, the Bianchi Orsetto 80, under licence, sold as the Raleigh Roma, with production continuing until 1964.

=== Post-war U.S. export market ===
After World War II, Raleigh became known for its lightweight sports roadster bicycles, often using Sturmey-Archer three- and five-speed transmissions. These cycles were considerably lighter and quicker than either the old heavy English utility roadster or the American "balloon-tire" cruiser bikes. In 1946, Raleigh and other English bicycle manufacturers accounted for 95% of the bicycles imported into the United States.

Raleigh's sports roadster, or British racer bicycles were exported around the world, including the United States. The company continued to increase imports to the United States until 1955, when a rate increase in foreign bicycle tariffs caused a shift in imports in favour of bicycles from West Germany and the Netherlands. However, this proved only a temporary setback, and by 1964, Raleigh was again a major selling brand in the US bicycle market.

=== Raleigh RSW ===
In 1965, Raleigh introduced the RSW 16, its long-awaited competitor to the hugely successful Moulton Bicycle. The new Raleigh shared several important features with the Moulton, including small wheels, an open frame and built-in luggage carrying capacity.

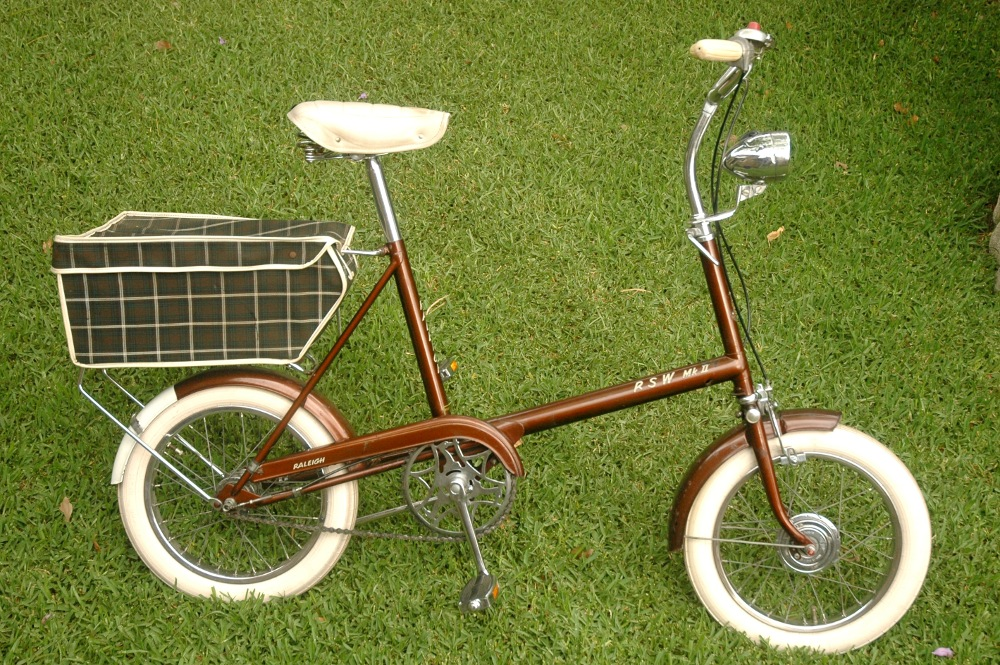
Late 1960s Raleigh RSW. The RSW was Raleigh's competitor to the fully suspended Moulton Bicycle

However, the RSW lacked the Moulton's suspension, which compensated for the bumpy ride that comes with small wheels. Instead, Raleigh fitted the RSW with balloon tyres, which effectively smoothed the ride but at the cost of increased rolling resistance. Nevertheless, the RSW was pleasant to ride, and Raleigh's extensive retail network ensured its success.

The success of the RSW took sales away from the Moulton and put that maker into financial difficulties. Raleigh then bought out Moulton and produced both bikes until 1974. Raleigh also produced a sister model to the RSW, the 'Twenty', which was more successful and which remained in production well into the 1980s.

=== Expansion and mergers ===
While bicycle production had steadily risen through the mid-1950s, the British market began to decline with the increasing affordability and popularity of the motor car. For much of the postwar era, British bicycle manufacturers had largely competed with each other in both the home and export markets, but 1956 saw the formation of the British Cycle Corporation by the Tube Investments Group which already owned Phillips, Hercules, Armstrong, and Norman. In 1957, Raleigh bought the BSA Cycles Ltd., BSA's bicycle division, which gave them exclusive use of the former brand names New Hudson and Sunbeam. Raleigh also already owned the Robin Hood brand, and Three Spires with Triumph (cycles) also at their disposal.

BSA had itself acquired Triumph Cycle Co. Ltd. only five years previously. TI added the Sun bicycle company to their stable in 1958, and with two "super groups" now controlling a large portion of the market, it was perhaps inevitable that in 1960, Tube Investments acquired Raleigh and merged the British Cycle Corporation with Raleigh to form TI–Raleigh, which now had 75% of the UK market. TI–Raleigh then acquired Carlton Cycles in Worksop, England that same year, at the time one of the largest semi-custom lightweight makers in the UK. TI Raleigh gave total control of its cycle division to Raleigh and soon set about marketing many of the acquired names as budget ranges, though with Raleigh frames. The old Lines Bros. factory at Handsworth, acquired in 1971, produced non Raleigh branded product well into the 1980s, together with Raleigh branded models such as the popular Raleigh Arena. However, the majority of Raleigh branded models were built in the main plant at Nottingham. Sun branded bicycles were made in the Carlton factory at Worksop, England.

As a vertically integrated manufacturer in the mid-1960s, TI–Raleigh owned Brooks (one of the oldest saddle makers in the world), Sturmey-Archer (pioneer of 3-speed hubs), and Reynolds (maker of 531 tubing). Carlton, which had been unable to make inroads in the US market after a failed rebranding deal with Huffy, found success in the late 1960s by recasting itself as "Raleigh-Carlton", a Raleigh-logo'd bike with some Carlton badging, and using the US dealer network to import and distribute bikes.

One consequence of the vertically integrated approach was that Raleigh did not adopt ISO threading standards and dimensions until the 1980s for some of its range (premium models were standardised earlier). The bottom bracket shell of the hugely successful Twenty range of shopper bikes, the Chopper and even the 1976 Grifter, all had a Raleigh exclusive 76mm wide bottom bracket shell. Headsets and bottom brackets use Raleigh exclusive 26 threads per inch (TPI) threading (until 1974 when some models reverted to the standard 24 TPI.) There were even models that had a mixture of both, with the fork thread being different to the bottom bracket thread. Indeed, the 1981 Raleigh Bomber had the original Raleigh 26 TPI threading despite the earlier Grifter model and Chopper (1974 on) having already reverted to 24 TPI.

=== The Raleigh Chopper ===
The Raleigh Chopper was designed by Nottingham native Alan Oakley, though this has been disputed by Cambridge designer Tom Karen. The Chopper was patented in the UK in 1967 and patented in the US in 1968. The bike was the "must have" item and signifier of "coolness" for many children at the time. The Chopper was first available for sale in June 1969 in North America. It went on sale in the UK in 1970 and sold well, and was a key factor in reviving the company's fortunes. The Chopper featured a three-speed Sturmey-Archer gear hub, shifted using a top-tube mounted gear lever reminiscent of the early Harley-Davidson suicide shifter – one of its "cool" features. Other differences were the unusual frame, long padded seat with backrest, sprung suspension at the back, high-rise handlebars, and differently sized front (16-inch) and rear (20-inch) wheels. Tyres were wider than usual for the time, with a chunky tread on the rear wheel, featuring red highlights on the sidewall. The price was from approximately £32 for a standard Chopper to £55 for the deluxe. Two smaller versions, the Chipper and Tomahawk, also sold well.

The Mk 2 Chopper was an improved version from 1972. It had the option of five-speed derailleur gears in the United States, but all UK bikes had the three-speed hub, with the exception of a model introduced in 1973 and only available in a bizarre shade of pink. This model was discontinued in 1976. The Mk 2 had a shorter seat and the frame modified to move the rear of the seat forward, this helped prevent the bike tipping up. The shorter seat also made it harder to ride '2 up' (two people on the bike at a time). The Chopper remained in production until 1982, when the rising popularity of the BMX bicycle caused sales to drop off.

Raleigh revisited the chopper design in recent times with great success, although the new version has had some changes to conform to modern safety laws. Gone is the top tube shifter and long integrated seat, but the look and feel of the bike remain.

=== 1979–1987 under Tube Investments ===
In 1979, production of Raleigh 531 butted-tube bicycles reached 10,000 units a year. In 1981, the former Carlton factory at Worksop closed after a vote was held. The original decision to continue at Worksop was reversed but the management decided to go with the original decision, and by the autumn production was moved to a Lightweights facility at Nottingham. However, all bicycles made there afterward still carried the W for Worksop frame number designation until early 1990. In 1982, rights to the Raleigh USA name were purchased by the Huffy Corporation after decades of being the US distributor of Raleigh bikes from England. Under the terms of the agreement, Raleigh of England licensed Huffy to design and distribute Raleigh bicycles in the US, and Huffy was given instant access to a nationwide network of bike shops. The renamed Raleigh Cycle Company of America sold their bikes in the US. In the rest of the world, origin varied. The majority of territories received bikes from Raleigh in England, but other markets such as South Africa and India for example, had their own independently owned "Raleigh" companies like with Huffy in the US. At that time, production of some U.S. Raleigh models were shifted to Japan, with Bridgestone manufacturing most of these bikes. By 1984, all Raleighs for the American market, except the top-of-the range Team Professional (made in Ilkeston) and Prestige road bikes (made in Nottingham), were produced in the Far East. Meanwhile, in the home market, Raleigh had broken into the new UK BMX market with their Burner range, which was very successful.

=== 1987–2012 Derby Cycles era ===
In 1987, the leading German bicycle manufacturer Derby Cycle bought Raleigh from Ti and Raleigh USA from Huffy. In 1988, Derby opened a factory in Kent, Washington manufacturing two Raleigh lines, the bimetallic Technium road bike line, which used heat-treated aluminum main frame tubes, thermally bonded and heat-cured to internal steel lugs using a Boeing-developed proprietary epoxy – along with chromoly steel head tube and rear stays. Kent also manufactured the off-road chromoly steel Altimetric line (Tangent CX, Traverse CX, Tactic CX and Talon CX 1991–1992). The factory closed in 1994. All Raleigh Cycle Company of America parts and frames from 1995 on were then mass-produced in China and Taiwan and assembled in other plants.

The high-end framesets offered for sale in Raleigh catalogues together with the frames built for Team riders were produced in Ilkeston by the Special Bicycle Development Unit (SBDU) from 1974 onward under the guidance of Gerald O'Donovan; production was moved to the Lightweight Facility in Nottingham, albeit on a much reduced workforce, on closure of the Ilkeston factory in 1986.

Raleigh Canada had a factory in Waterloo, Quebec from 1972 to 2013. Derby Cycle acquired Diamondback Bicycles in 1999. In the same year, Raleigh ceased volume production of frames in the UK and its frame-making equipment were sold by auction.

In 2000, Derby Cycle controlled Raleigh USA, Raleigh UK, Raleigh Canada, and Raleigh Ireland. In the latter three markets, Raleigh was the number-one manufacturer of bicycles. Derby Cycle began a series of divestitures, because of financial pressure and sold Sturmey-Archer's factory site to the University of Nottingham and Sturmey-Archer and saddle manufacturer Brooks to a small company called Lenark. Lenark promised to build a new factory in Calverton but failed to pay the first instalment and the company entered liquidation. It was reported that the reason for selling the business, after extracting the cash for the factory site, was to have Lenark declare it insolvent so that neither Derby nor Lenark would have to pay the redundancy costs. Sturmey-Archer's assets were acquired by SunRace of Taiwan who relocated the factory to Taiwan and sales to the Netherlands. Sister company Brooks was sold to Selle Royal of Italy.

In 2001, following continuing financial problems at Derby Cycle, there was a management buy-out of all the remaining Raleigh companies led by Alan Finden-Crofts. By 2003, assembly of bicycles had ended in the UK with 280 assembly and factory staff made redundant, and bicycles were to come "from Vietnam and other centres of 'low-cost, high-quality' production" with final assembly taking place in Cloppenburg, Germany.

In 2012, Derby agreed to be acquired by Pon Holdings, a Dutch company, as part of their new bicycle group. and buyout terms were agreed in 2012.

=== 2012 to date Accell era ===
In April 2012, Raleigh UK, Canada and USA were acquired by a separate Dutch group Accell for £62m (US$100m), whose portfolio included the Lapierre and Ghost bicycle brands.

In 2019, Accell sold Canadian rights to the Raleigh brand together with sister brands Diamondback, Redline and IZIP to the retailer Canadian Tire for $16m.

In April 2021, Accell regained the Raleigh licence in Germany, Austria and Switzerland.

In February 2025, Raleigh UK formally changed its name to Accell UK & Ireland recognising the company's full integration into Accell.

The company had made redundancies in 2024 and in January 2025 reported losses of £30m. In August 2026, Accell said it had "exhausted all the available options", was "no longer able to meet its financial obligations" and had begun insolvency proceedings. An Irish-based investment firm, Quanta Capital, expressed interest in buying the group.

== Sport ==
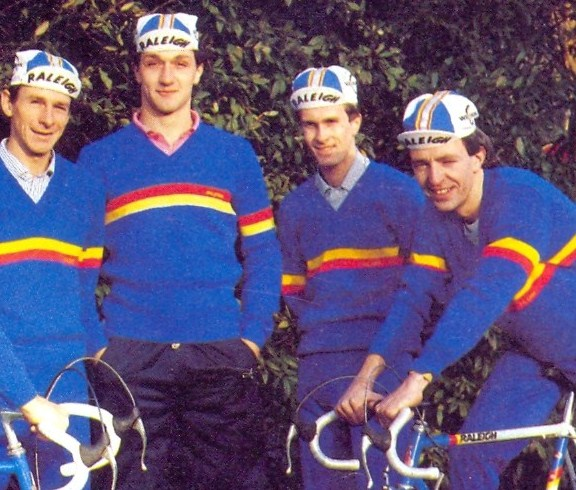
Riders of the 1986 Raleigh Weinmann team

Raleigh had a long association with cycle sport. Most notable is the TI–Raleigh team of the 1970s and 1980s. In 1980 Joop Zoetemelk won the Tour de France on a Raleigh during which time Admiral Sports produced the jersey. In the mid-1980s the Raleigh team was co-sponsored by Panasonic. In 1984, riding Raleigh-badged bicycles, Team USA scored several impressive victories at the Olympic Games in Los Angeles. The company also supplied bicycles to the French Système U team in the late 1980s where Laurent Fignon lost the 1989 Tour de France to Greg LeMond by 8 seconds. The company's special products division made race frames, including those used by the Raleigh professional team of the 1970s. Presently Raleigh as a company owns the Diamondback Bike brand as well. During the 1980s Raleigh also supported British professional teams, including Raleigh Banana and Raleigh Weinmann. Raleigh's most notable riders were Paul Sherwin, Malcolm Elliott, Mark Bell, Paul Watson, Jon Clay and Jeff Williams. It also sponsored a mountain bike team in the early 1990s that also raced in road events.

In 2009 it was announced that the company would be creating a new Continental-level cycling team called Team Raleigh. The Team were co-sponsored by the global shipping and logistics firm GAC in 2012 and were known as Team Raleigh-GAC. The season was notable for Team Raleigh's first victory in the Tour Series Round 6 and a succession of Premier Calendar wins, which resulted in team rider Graham Briggs finishing the season at the top of British Cycling's UK Elite Men's standings. Raleigh once again became the sole headline sponsor of the team in 2013 and the team re-paid the investment with high-profile wins in the Tour de Normandie, Tour of the Reservoir and Tour Series Rounds 1 and 2. Raleigh decided to withdraw from supporting a road team at the end of the 2017 season

== Archives ==
The Raleigh archives, including the Sturmey-Archer papers, are at Nottinghamshire Record Office.

== Historic models ==
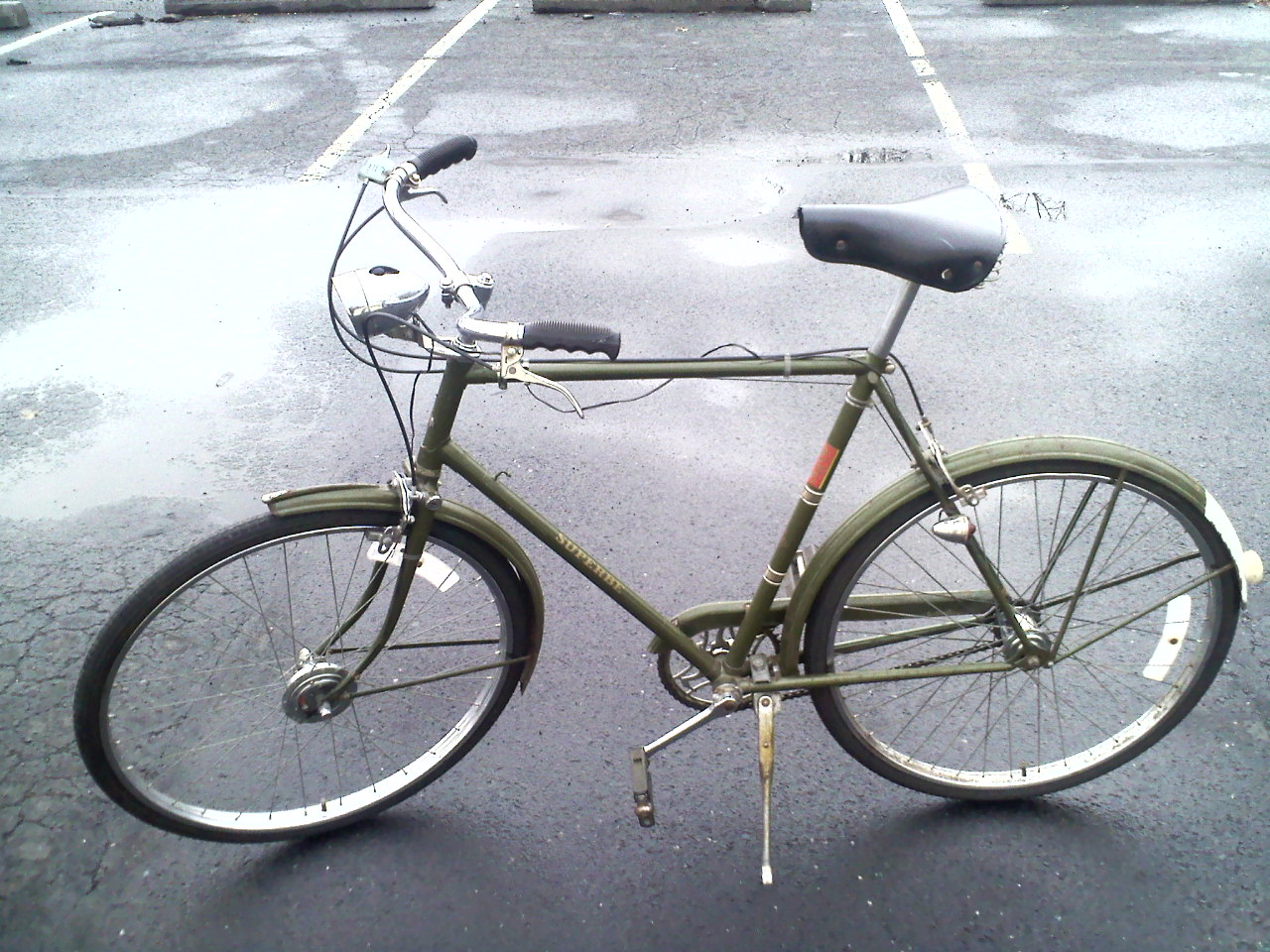
Green three-speed 1971 Raleigh Superbe with 26-inch wheels and dynohub

- Bomber
- Burner
- Chopper
- Cyclone
- Strika
- Twenty
- Winkie Tricycle

== In media ==
Saturday Night and Sunday Morning, the 1958 debut novel by Alan Sillitoe, is partly set in Raleigh's Nottingham factory, Sillitoe himself being an ex-employee of the firm. Several scenes for the 1960 film adaptation starring Albert Finney were filmed on location at the factory itself.

In the 1985 movie American Flyers, David Sommers played by David Marshall Grant, is seen riding through St. Louis, Missouri, on a Raleigh bicycle from that same era. Later in the film, specialized bicycles are used for the race scenes in Colorado and training. In the 1986 bike messenger film Quicksilver a variety of Raleigh USA bicycles are used. 1984–85 road bikes are used throughout by notable players in the movie. Kevin Bacon's bicycle is a singlespeed '84 Raleigh Competition. While no differentiation is made in the film, at least three different configurations are seen on Bacon's bike during the movie: fixed-gear, singlespeed, and outfitted with 0-degree trick forks during various scenes in Bacon's apartment. A possible freewheel is suggested early in the film when Bacon dismounts while in motion and a distinct clicking sound is heard until the bike stops moving. A 1984/5 Raleigh Grand Prix is used for the opening chase sequence, and a 1984 or '85 Super Course makes a brief appearance in the opening credits.

In 2019, Raleigh 's electric bikes featured in episode 4 of the 2019 season of The Apprentice.

== See also ==
- The Fun Zimbabwe Ride 2009 – Raleigh donated bicycles to ensure the ride would take place.
- Flying Pigeon
