= The Fun Zimbabwe Ride 2009 =

The Fun Zimbabwe Ride 2009 was a 2009 fundraising event in Zimbabwe for H.E.L.P. International, a children's charity with multiple projects based in Zimbabwe.

== History ==
The event was the brainchild of Richard Pantlin from Oxford. In 2008, Pantlin was looking for ways to raise funds for charities operating in Zimbabwe. He had already been fundraising for charities with projects in South Africa. His main method of fundraising was to ride his bicycle to foreign locations.

An Internet search revealed that H.E.L.P. International, a children's charity, had projects in Zimbabwe. On inquiry, Pantlin got in touch with Asher Mupasi, a trustee of the charity. By coincidence, Asher was setting up an annual fundraising bicycle race in Zimbabwe by locals to encourage locals to participate in raising funds for funding child welfare projects in their area. H.E.L.P. International would be staging a 50-mile (80 km) race each year. The charity was fundraising to build a children's home at Chatsworth, Zimbabwe. There were already several children cared for in selected homes in the community, but some were HIV-positive and required special attention, and a children's home would be the best way to cater for their needs.

After some discussion, the two men agreed to stage the fundraising bike ride in Zimbabwe itself. In early 2008, Zimbabwe was considered unusual in that there were acute shortages of almost every commodity in the country. The ride would be a challenge on many levels. A published report on life expectancy in Zimbabwe suggested it was the lowest in the world at female life expectancy of 34 years and male life of 37 years. This suggested that both Richard and Asher should be already dead if they were living in Zimbabwe.

The international press was, at this point, awash with condemnation of the Zimbabwe government and warning visitors not to visit the country. The project had other threats such as the outbreak of Cholera, the disappearance of political individuals, the strikes by health and other staff, the absence of what might be called law and order, etc. The general advice was "Do not venture in Zimbabwe".

The announcement that the project was going ahead coincided with the arrival of the world recession and many would-be contributors were affected, leaving the projected financially exposed. The organizers did not want to postpone seeing that the plight of the children was getting worse.

The ride occurred in April 2009.

By Christmas 2008, people in the United Kingdom, USA, Canada, Spain, South Africa, and Zimbabwe itself had expressed interest in the project. On 26 November 2008 Richard and Asher enlisted the support of four members of Parliament, all from different parties. They also held a meeting with the Deputy Ambassador at the Zimbabwe Embassy to ask for help with equipment regarding custom duty and delays since they would not have many days in Zimbabwe.

On March 11, 2009, the Engineers at Stoke on Trent College released the ambulances ready for shipping to Zimbabwe. At this point the riders had no bikes and no idea where to get bikes. Although many enquiries had been made to bike companies, not one was willing to help.

An enquiry to Raleigh of South Africa was the first to be received positively. They recommended one of their tested products specially designed for long distance. They would also serve well as ambulance bikes. It was confirmed that they could be source in Johannesburg.

Mupasi and Pantlin then made plans to fly into South Africa instead of directly to Zimbabwe. To capture the ride on video, the following items were purchased:

- Disgo camcorder which a very small camcorder that can be carried in the rider's pocket.
- 8 2 gig SD-cards giving 16 hours of filming at medium resolution for the camera

The following items were donated by well wishers for the children:

- Pencils
- Pens
- Balloons
- A microscope for the school most used by H.E.L.P. International.

== Goal ==
To cycle the distance from Bulawayo to Masvingo to Harare over a reasonable period of time without any organized support, carrying all provisions, including tents, water purification, food, and other things. To be able to effectively deal with any emergencies that may arise without necessarily appealing to other than local people. While in any area, use your bike just like any local person with a bike would do, the only difference being the riders are going a bit further than a local person would go, over 600 km. They would carry provisions on bicycle ambulances.

== Purpose of ride ==
- To show that a bicycle is a viable means of transport for both short and long distances
- To show that a bicycle can be adapted to be a lot more versatile like in this case where it can be an ambulance
- To show that a bicycle can help save lives when used in areas with poor roads to transport sick people to hospitals
- To show that transportation is not always polluting. A bicycle is a pollution-free means of transport and all unwanted bikes should be given to people who have a use for. This would reduce the rate of pollution on earth
- It does not cost that much to improve lives. There are many simple and available machines and tools which only require transportation from one global location to another before they are put to good use.
- To raise awareness of the need of children in Zimbabwe.
- To find the answer to the question: "Does it matter who is to blame for the plight of the disadvantaged?"
- To raise funds for the children's needs

== Why fun? ==
As the riders went, they met children along the way. They handed over pencils, small toys and balloons to them and clowns for them to laugh at.

== Monitoring the ride ==
A page to record all that happens during the ride was set up so that everyone with Internet access could follow the progress of the riders on a daily basis. A video of some aspects of the ride will be released after the ride.

== The ride itself ==
The roads in Zimbabwe are not maintained and mostly do not have a hard shoulder. Drivers mostly do not observe basic road rules and seem to ignore the fact that there is a variety of vehicles on the roads, of which bicycles are one valid type. Also very few drivers observe the stipulated speed limits. If you are used to cycling on European roads, you need to have a serious attitude change before you can cycle on Zimbabwean roads. Other road users care little whether you survive or not. The riders were shouted at to get off the road a few times, also on many occasions they were physically forced off the road by wagons overtaking in obviously dangerous situations.

From Bulawayo there was a very strong head wind which slowed the riders significantly, especially as they were carrying all their provisions with them in GO-HOME bags. After Masvingo, there was a side wind which was a lot easier to handle and the riders were able to increase their speeds. The following is a progress chart covering the whole ride.

Day	Date	Start	Finish	Distance In Kilometers	Injuries/ Accidental Damage	Police Encounter	Day	Accommodation
1	03/04/2009	Bulawayo City Hall	Esigodini	44	1	0	Fri	Country Club
2	04/04/2009	Esigodini	Mbalabala	41	0	0	Sat	-
2	04/04/2009	Mbalabala	Nkankezi	50	0	0	Sat	School
3	05/04/2009	Nkankezi	Zvishavane	80	Chain	1	Sun	Church hall
4	06/04/2009	Zvishavane	Mhandamabwe	35	0	0	Mon	School
5	07/04/2009	Mhandamabwe	Masvingo	53	Gears	0	Tues	House
6	08/04/2009	Masvingo	Chatsworth turn off	50	0	0	Wed	House
6	08/04/2009	Chatsworth turn off	Chatsworth	10	0	0	Wed	-
7	09/04/2009	Chatsworth	Rural Zimuto	12	0	1	Thur	House
7	09/04/2009	Rural Zimuto	Chatsworth	12	0	0	Thur	-
8	10/04/2009	Chatsworth	Chatsworth turn off	10	0	0	Fri	-
8	10/04/2009	Chatsworth turn off	Chivhu	87	1	0	Sat	Camp
9	11/04/2009	Chivhu	Beatrice	95	0	0	Sun	Motel
10	12/04/2009	Beatrice	Harare City Hall	53	Gears	0	Mon	House
		Estimated distance looking for camp/water/food		5			Tue	-
Total	8 Full Days			637	5	2		

Bikes used: Raleigh Tourer, road tires,

== Physical threats to riders during ride ==
During the planning stage, information arriving from people on the ground in Zimbabwe suggested that the roads were in severe disrepair, causing traffic to move very slowly. This was interpreted by the riders to mean safety from traffic would be high since everyone would be trying to miss potholes. However, on arrival in Zimbabwe, it soon became clear that vehicles, including heavy wagons, were moving much faster than expected, and were overtaking much more dangerously than was anticipated. For this reason, traffic became the single biggest threat to rider safety during the ride.

== Support ==
This project is supported by the following among others:

- The Rotary Club of Whitchurch, Cheshire, UK
- Stoke on Trent City Council
- Staffordshire Police
- Stoke on Trent College
- Stoke on Trent Seventh-day Adventist Church
- e'Pap, Affordable Nutrition. of South Africa.
