= Raleigh Burner =

BMX bicycle

The Raleigh Burner is a BMX bicycle first launched in early 1982 by the Raleigh Bicycle Company. The name continued to 1988 and was brought back in the early 2000s, although it has been nowhere near as successful saleswise as the 1980s item.

== Frames ==
The Raleigh Burner range was split into six different frames:

- Mk1 Burner
- MK1 Pro Burner
- Mk2 Burner
- MK2 Aero Pro Burner
- Team Frame

=== Mk1 Burner ===
This can be identified by the loop tail frame and gusset with two holes in it. This first version (1982–1983) was originally available in several variants:

The basic Burner model was available with either a blue or red frame. It had conventional wire-spoked wheels, matt black front forks, red or blue saddle depending on the frame colour and yellow frame pads, and gold-coloured brake calipers and levers. Typical UK retail price of the basic model in 1982 was £120.

During this period, the next model up was the Tuff Burner. As per the basic model, the Tuff Burner was available with either red or blue frames, and accompanied by matt black forks. The Tuff Burner was distinguished from the basic model by its yellow, Five-spoke Skyway Tuff II 'Mag' (nylon) wheels (Not to be confused with the later inferior "Mag burner" wheels).with color coordinated accessories as follows:

Red/yellow Tuff Burner: Red frame, red saddle, yellow grips, Gold Anodised brake levers and brake calipers, yellow pads, yellow Skyway Tuff 2 Mag wheels with red tires.

Blue/Yellow Tuff Burner: Blue frame, blue saddle, blue grips, blue anodised brake levers and brake calipers, yellow pads, yellow Skyway Tuff 2 Mag wheels with blue tires.

Typical UK retail price of the red or blue Tuff Burner in 1982 was £130.

The next model up in the years 1982–1983 was the Super Burner, which was distinguished by its apparently gold paintwork (In fact, the bike's frame was chrome plated and then covered with a transparent, gold-tinted film). It had black frame pads with gold coloured script. In the years 1982–1983 the Mark 1 Super Burner was available only with conventional wire-spoked wheels that had gold-painted rims, although a variant with five-spoke mag wheels (in black) became available for the 1984 model year. This later 'Mag' version of the Super Burner was known as the Super Tuff Burner.

The typical UK retail price of a Super Burner in 1982 was £140.

Next up in the line was the Ultra Burner, available in two colour combinations – silver and blue, and black and gold. The Ultra Burner featured Araya 7X alloy wheels and a host of other high-end alloy componentry anodized gold or blue depending on the color combo. Although still utilizing the same steel frame as a standard burner, the use of light alloy components and cromoly cranks on the Ultra Burner dropped the full weight of the bike by 4 pounds!

The top of the range in that year was the Pro Burner which featured blue anodized light alloy componentry from Araya, Suntour and Dia Compe paired with a 100% full chromoly frame, fork and handlebars in a gleaming chrome plated finish. The Pro also featured a distinctive frame gusset with the Raleigh "R" cut out.

=== Mk1.2 Burner - AKA Model B ===
These Burners still had round tubing but several key features changed, among them: plastic pedals replaced the original metal "rat-traps", rubber grips with two-tone coloring replaced the foam ones, and tubing was deemed Carbospec 23 with stickers in key locations such as the fork, replacing the regular Raleigh logo with "Competition 23" etc.

=== Mk2 Burner ===
This has an oval profile rather than round as per Mk1.The looptail was ditched and the frame made longer. A letter 'R' was cut out in the front and rear wheel spindle drop outs.

There were also some Burners built using Japanese Tange or Kozumi frames. These were the Cromo Burner, the Aero Pro and the Team Aero Pro. These were top-class bikes with quality wheels and brakes.

=== MK3 Burner ===
In 2007 Raleigh started to release anniversary models in limited numbers. Raleigh joined forces with Burner fans to re-create what was deemed the most memorable Burner (the Aero pro burner in the Raleigh team colours). Mag burners have followed since.
