= London–Surrey Cycle Classic =

2011 test event for the 2012 Summer Olympics

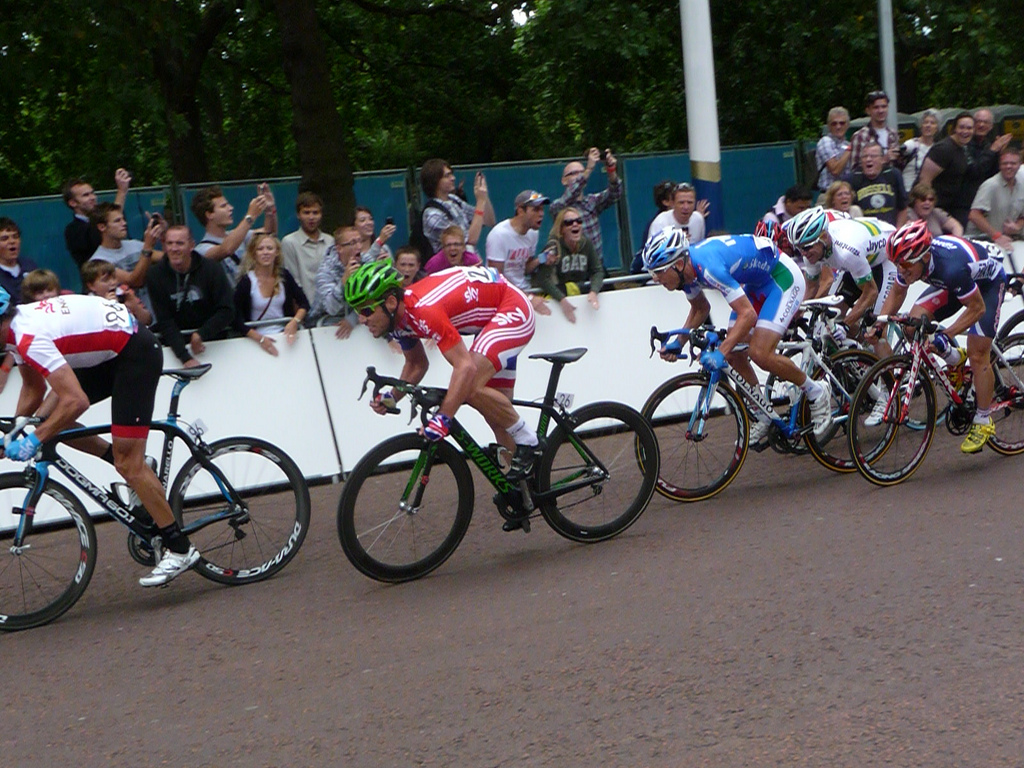
- Sprint finish on the Mall, as winner Mark Cavendish launches his bid to win.

Race details
- Date: 14 August 2011
- Region: London, England
- Discipline: Road
- Competition: UCI Europe Tour (2010–11)
- Type: One-day classic
- Organiser: London Organising Committee of the Olympic Games and Paralympic Games & Union Cycliste Internationale
- Web site: www.londonpreparesseries.com/roadcycling

The London–Surrey Cycle Classic was a one-off, one-day bicycle race that served as one of three U.K. events in the year-long 2010–11 UCI Europe Tour and acted as the test event for the 2012 Summer Olympics. The race was part of the London Prepares series of events. The race was run over most of the Olympic course, starting in the Mall and heading into Surrey, where the riders completed two laps of the Box Hill loop before making their way back to the Mall. The course took the riders through or beside four Royal Parks and six London Boroughs. Most of the riders represented countries instead of trade teams; however, there were several, mainly British, trade teams in the race with England being classified as one of them. The race was won by 2011 Tour de France Green Jersey winner Mark Cavendish.

Following the Olympic Games, an annual race was held on a similar course between 2013 and 2019 – part of the RideLondon cycling festival.

== Route ==
The race started on The Mall then headed out of London, using the King's Road via Putney Bridge, part of Roehampton, Richmond Park, Richmond Hill, Twickenham and Teddington running towards Hampton Court (on the Greater London border). From Hampton Court the race continued southwest, passing the towns of Walton on Thames and the outskirts of Weybridge, then turned south, however unlike the Olympic course, took the town centres of West Byfleet, Woking and Guildford, before heading east on the A25 to Dorking. From Dorking the race headed north around the Box Hill loop, twice instead of the nine for the Olympics, taking in The Zig Zag road climb twice. From there the race headed north through Leatherhead and Esher on its return to London via Hampton Court before going through Richmond Park from the south (Kingston upon Thames) and then heading along the same roads the race used on its outbound journey back to the Mall.

== Teams and riders ==
138 riders from 19 national teams and 10 trade teams took part in the race. Mark Cavendish was the pre-race favourite and he was joined in the race by his HTC teammate, Australian Matthew Goss. Other Australians accompanying Goss were Heinrich Haussler and Stuart O'Grady. Also in the race were Tom Boonen of Belgium and American Tyler Farrar.

=== National squads ===
| Team | Squad |
|---|---|
| Australia | Matthew Goss, Stuart O'Grady, Michael Matthews, Leigh Howard, Heinrich Haussler |
| Belgium | Tom Boonen, Jan Bakelants, Kevin De Weert, Stijn Joseph, Jurgen Van de Walle |
| Brazil | José Medeiros, Gideoni Monteiro, Gregolry Panizo, Cleberson Weber |
| Canada | Christian Meier, Dominique Rollin, Jamie Riggs, David Veilleux, Stuart Wight |
| Croatia | Robert Kišerlovski, Vladimir Miholjević, Luka Grubic, Deni Banicek |
| France | Samuel Dumoulin, Tony Gallopin, Jonathan Hivert, Blel Kadri, Yoann Offredo |
| Germany | Patrick Bercz, Marcel Klaz, Marcel Meisen, Theo Rheinhardt, Fabian Schnaidt |
| Great Britain | Mark Cavendish, Peter Kennaugh, Ian Stannard, Alex Dowsett, Roger Hammond |
| Ireland | Felix English, Peter Hawkins, Martyn Irvine, David McCann |
| Italy | Eros Capecchi, Oscar Gatto, Sacha Modolo, Luca Paolini, Diego Ulissi |
| Japan | Yukiya Arashiro, Yukihiro Doi, Shinichi Fukushima, Yusuke Hatanaka, Takashi Miyazawa |
| Luxembourg | Bob Jungels, Tom Kohn, Tom Schanen, Pit Schlechter, Tom Thill |
| Morocco | Tarik Chaoufi, Mohamed Said El Ammoury, Adil Jelloul, Mouhssine Lahsaini, Abdeiati Saadoune |
| New Zealand | Clinton Avery, Jason Christie, Tom David, Julian Dean |
| Norway | Kurt Asle Arvesen, Alexander Kristoff, Lars Petter Nordhaug, |
| Poland | Maciej Bodnar, Michał Gołaś, Michał Kwiatkowski, Bartłomiej Matysiak, Maciej Paterski |
| Russia | Evgeny Bakhin, Roman Koltcov, Sergei Pomoshnikov, Victor Sudeykin, Alexey Velikanov |
| Slovenia | Borut Božič, Jure Kocjan, Kristjan Koren, Gorazd Štangelj |
| United States of America | Ian Boswell, Tyler Farrar, Ty Magner, Gavin Mannion, Tanner Putt |

=== Trade teams/non-national squads ===
| Team | Squad |
|---|---|
| An Post–Sean Kelly | Gediminas Bagdonas, Samuel Bennett, Niko Eeckhout, Andrew Fenn, Philip Lavery |
| Team Corley Cycles | Richard Cartland, Simond Gaynood, Jake Hales, Ian Knight, Christopher McNamara |
| Cyclepremier-Mataltek | Dale Appleby, Ross Creber, Stephan Gallagher, Richard Hepworth, Jason White |
| Endura | Alexandre Blain, David Clarke, James Moss, Evan Oliphant, Ian Wilkinson |
| England | Steve Cummings, Russell Downing, Chris Froome, Jeremy Hunt, Daniel Lloyd |
| Motorpoint | Ian Bibby, Marcin Białobłocki, Jonathan McEvoy, James Sampson, Peter Williams |
| Rapha-Condor-Sharp | Edward Clancy, Dan Craven, Graham Briggs, Kristian House, Andrew Tennant, |
| Team Raleigh | Dan Fleeman, Richard Handley, Liam Holohan, Matt Jones, Gael le Bellec |
| Sigma Sport–Specialized | Russell Hampton, Steven Lampier, Tom Last, Tom Murray, Simon Richardson |
| Twenty3c-Orbea | Michael Cuming, Andrew Griffiths, Joeseph Perrett, Rafael Rodriguez–Segarra, Marcel Six |

== Race ==
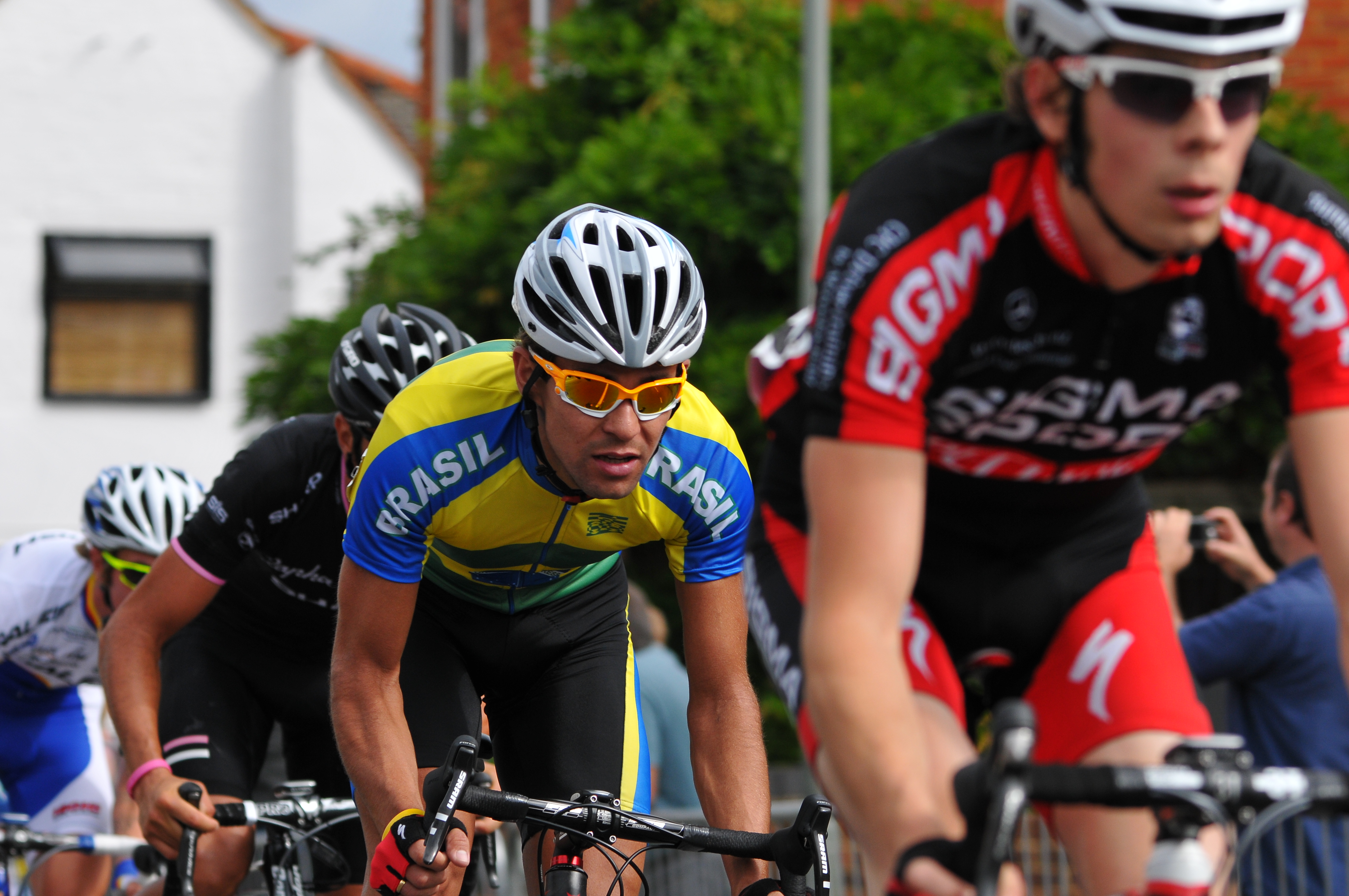
The four-man breakaway. Right to left: Murray, Weber, House and Holohan in Ripley

The race gave one more leg than the previous year in Britain to the season-long UCI European Tour in 2011 by including not only the Rutland–Melton International CiCLE Classic and Tour of Britain but also this prototype long-distance circuit (taking in London twice and its large section within Surrey). The course would also witness most of the Summer Olympics road race in 2012, however was slightly modified.

In the week preceding the race London experienced a series of riots; several football matches were called off, but the London–Surrey Cycle Classic was allowed to proceed. On race day British riders Liam Holohan, Kristian House and Tom Murray and Brazil's Cleberson Weber opened up a 6-minute gap in the breakaway before the peloton started to pull them back on the final Box Hill climb. 2009 British road race champion House won the King of the Mountains award. The lead quartet were swept up in the final 9 kilometres as Great Britain and England controlled the pace. Kurt Asle Arvesen then made a bid for the win before being brought back. With 12 kilometres to go, Tyler Farrar suffered a puncture. After chasing furiously he reached the peloton with 2 kilometres to go, only to see his chance of the win wiped out as a crash occurred; according to Heinrich Haussler it was caused by two riders fighting. The crash split the peloton and in a group of just 20 riders Mark Cavendish beat Sacha Modolo of Italy and France's Samuel Dumoulin in a sprint finish on the Mall.

=== Result ===
| Position | Rider | Time |
|---|---|---|
| 1 | Mark Cavendish (GBR) | 3:18:11 |
| 2 | Sacha Modolo (ITA) | Same time |
| 3 | Samuel Dumoulin (FRA) | Same time |
| 4 | Stuart O'Grady (AUS) | Same time |
| 5 | Michał Gołaś (POL) | Same time |
| 6 | Borut Božič (SLO) | Same time |
| 7 | Alexander Kristoff (NOR) | Same time |
| 8 | Matthew Goss (AUS) | Same time |
| 9 | Ian Bibby (GBR) (Motorpoint) | Same time |
| 10 | Andrew Tennant (GBR) (JLT–Condor) | Same time |

== Criticism of lack of women's event ==
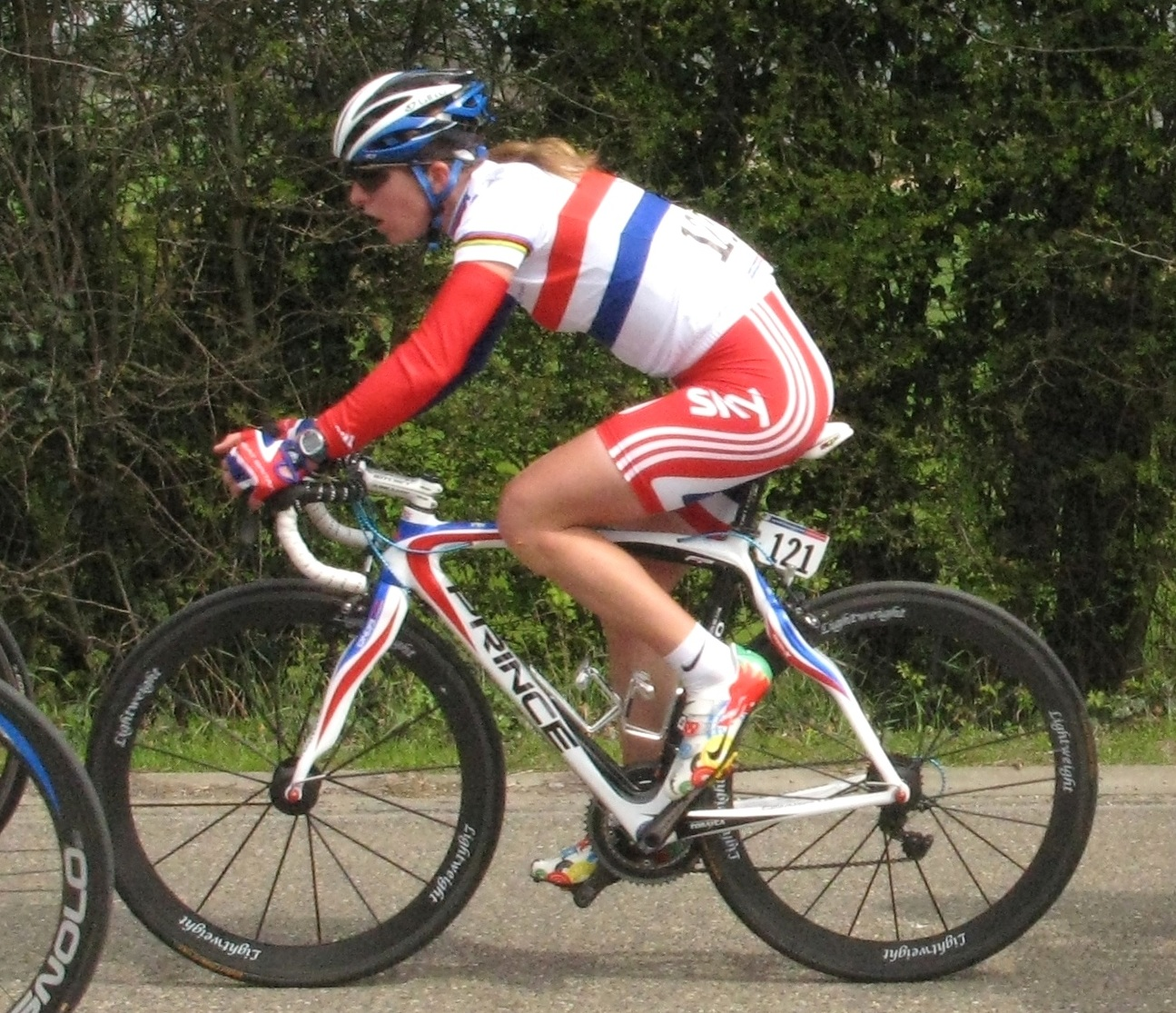
Nicole Cooke – seen here a year before in the Flèche Wallon, Belgium – accused the organisers of sexism

Unlike the road race the following year, no women's event was held, which led the 2008 Olympic Champion Nicole Cooke to accuse the organisers of sexism. 2010 World Time Trial Champion Emma Pooley was also disappointed, stating "How much extra effort would go in to putting on a women's race? I'm sorry, but we have a sport as well, it kind of annoys me every time." To remedy the lack of racing on the course Cooke and Lizzie Armitstead followed the race in the team cars to survey the course.

== Reaction ==
LOCOG's Director of Sport, Debbie Jevans declared herself pleased with the event. However, in her debrief with the UCI she said she would look at comments from riders, the impact of the full road closures along the route and the crowd restrictions on Box Hill. Jevans said that consensus was that it was a 'fantastic' course which was 'technically challenging.' However, riders complained about parts of the first part of the course; Dumoulin commenting that it was "a little dangerous." The Director also noted that the a section of the Box Hill area would be widened. As for the limited crowd of 3,400 on Box Hill, Jevans stated that she would look into trying to increase the capacity on that section as an estimated 100,000 people turned out to watch the event in total. Pat McQuaid, president of the UCI, was impressed by the spectator turnout.

BBC Surrey received complaints about inaccurate signage and road closures that cut off large parts of the towns. Complaints about the closures led Surrey County Council to issue an apology through Councillor Denise Saliagopolous for the problems experienced.

== TV coverage ==
A 20-minute highlights package was televised a week after the race on 21 August 2011. It was screened at 13:00 on BBC Two.
