= Ian Bibby =

British professional cyclist (born 1986)

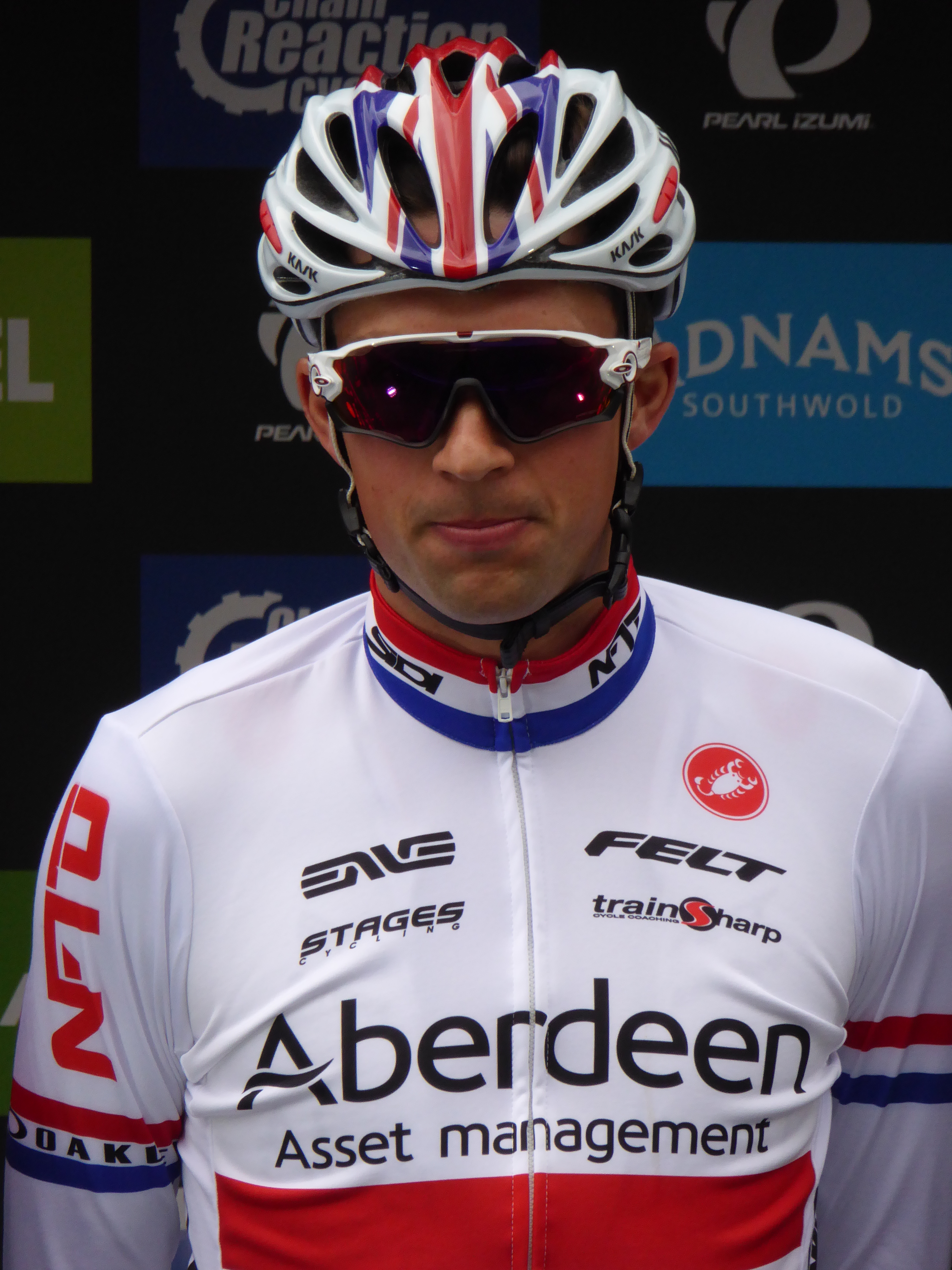
- Bibby in 2016

Personal information
- Full name: Ian Michael Bibby
- Born: 20 December 1986 (age 39) Preston, Lancashire, England

Cycling career
- Sport: Cycling
- Current team: Retired
- Disciplines: Road; Cyclo-cross
- Role: Rider

Professional teams
- 2009: Team Halfords
- 2010–2011: Motorpoint–Marshalls Pasta
- 2012: Endura Racing
- 2013–2014: Madison Genesis
- 2015–2016: NFTO
- 2017–2018: JLT–Condor
- 2019: Madison Genesis

Major wins
- One-day races and Classics National Cyclo-cross Championships (2010) National Circuit Race Championships (2015)

Ian Michael Bibby (born 20 December 1986) is a British former professional road and cyclo-cross cyclist from England, who rode professionally between 2009 and 2019. He was the winner of the 2010 British National Cyclo-cross Championships, and the 2015 British National Circuit Race Championships.

He retired at the end of the 2019 season, following the disbandment of his last professional team Madison Genesis.

== Major results ==
2009
3rd National Marathon Championships
2010
1st National Cyclo-cross Championships
1st London Nocturne
Tour Series

1st Round 3, Portsmouth
1st Round 8, Stoke-on-Trent

1st Prologue Cinturón a Mallorca
5th Overall Tour de Bretagne
8th Overall Vuelta Ciclista a León
2011
1st Overall Premier Calendar
1st Overall Tour of the Reservoir
3rd Overall Cinturón a Mallorca

1st Stage 3

5th Road race, National Road Championships
5th Tour de Mumbai II
9th London–Surrey Cycle Classic
10th OCBC Cycle Singapore
2012
8th Overall Mi-Août Bretonne

1st Stage 2

2013
2nd Rutland–Melton CiCLE Classic
10th Trofeo Serra de Tramuntana
2014
4th Overall An Post Rás
2015
1st National Criterium Championships
1st Chorley Grand Prix
1st Ryedale Grand Prix
1st Stage 6 An Post Rás
6th Overall Bay Classic Series
6th Beaumont Trophy
2016
1st Manx International Grand Prix
1st Wiltshire Gran Prix
1st Ryedale Grand Prix
3rd Velothon Wales
10th Rutland–Melton CiCLE Classic
2017
1st Overall Bay Classic Series

1st Stage 1

1st Velothon Wales
1st Chorley Grand Prix
1st Lincoln Grand Prix
2nd Overall Istrian Spring Trophy
3rd Road race, National Road Championships
3rd Poreč Trophy
4th Overall Tour de Korea
2018
1st Prologue Tour of Japan
2nd Overall New Zealand Cycle Classic

1st Points classification
1st Stage 4

3rd Overall Tour of the Reservoir

1st Stage 1

6th Overall Tour de Yorkshire
9th Time trial, Commonwealth Games
