= Tom Stewart (cyclist) =

British cyclist (born 1990)

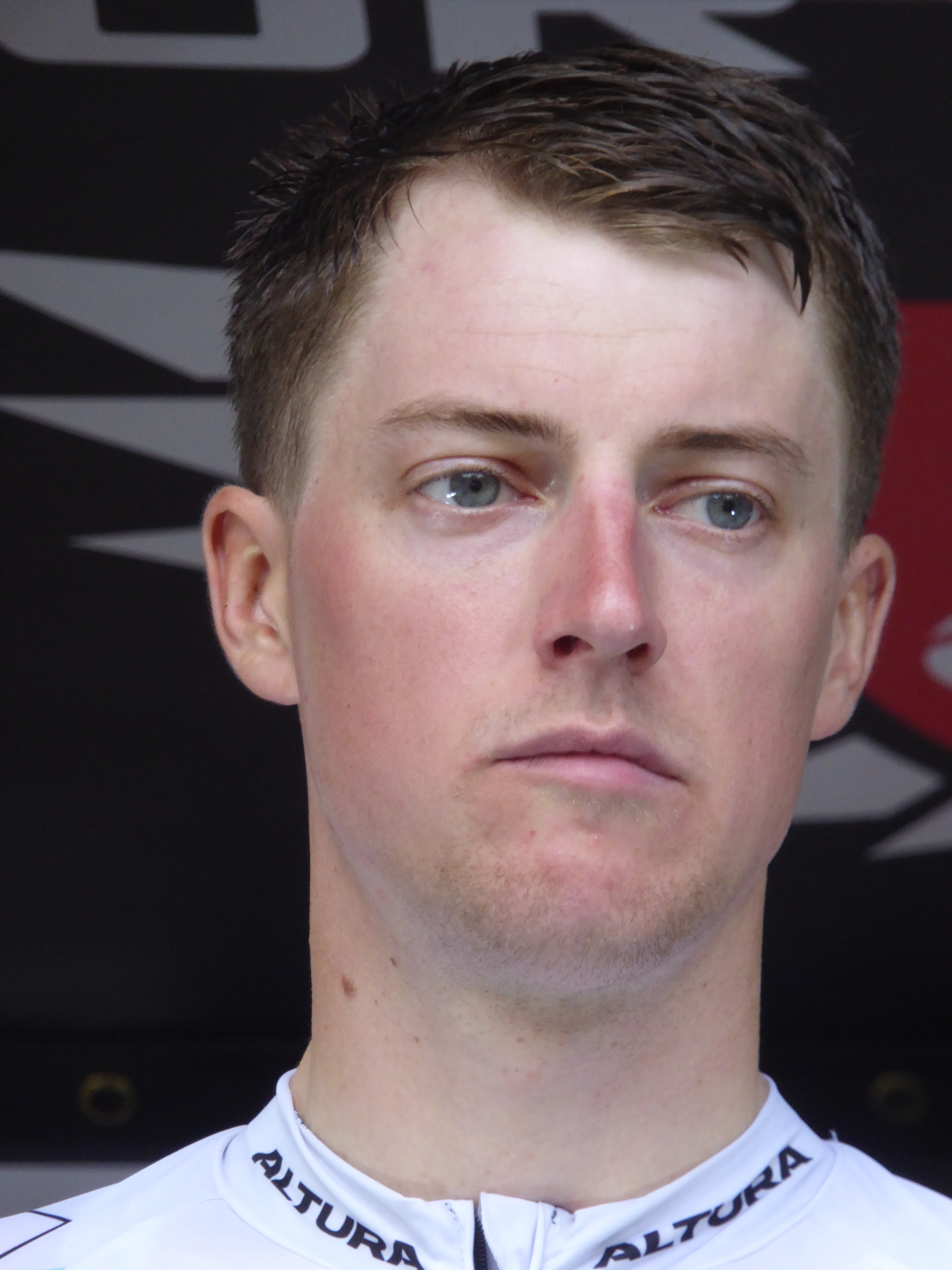
- Stewart in 2017

Personal information
- Full name: Thomas Stewart
- Born: 9 January 1990 (age 36) Doncaster, South Yorkshire, England

Cycling career
- Sport: Cycling
- Current team: Retired
- Discipline: Road
- Role: Rider

Amateur team
- 2013: Sportscover

Professional teams
- 2013: Team Raleigh
- 2014–2016: Madison Genesis
- 2017: ONE Pro Cycling
- 2018: JLT–Condor
- 2019–2020: Canyon dhb p/b Bloor Homes

Thomas Stewart (born 9 January 1990) is a British former racing cyclist, who rode professionally between 2013 and 2020 for five British UCI Continental teams.

== Major results ==
2013
2nd Premier Calendar
4th Overall Tour of the Reservoir
4th Beaumont Trophy
2014
2nd Arno Wallaard Memorial
2015
2nd Beaumont Trophy
8th Arnhem–Veenendaal Classic
2016
1st Velothon Wales
1st Lincoln Grand Prix
8th Dwars door het Hageland
2017
1st Overall Tour of the Reservoir
1st Stage 5 Szlakiem Walk Majora Hubala
3rd Beaumont Trophy
6th Overall Dubai Tour
2018
1st Overall Tour de Normandie
7th Rutland–Melton CiCLE Classic
8th Road race, Commonwealth Games
8th Overall New Zealand Cycle Classic
9th Poreč Trophy
2019
1st Lincoln Grand Prix
2nd Slag om Norg
8th Circuit de Wallonie
