= 2005 Tour of Britain =

The 2005 edition of the Tour of Britain stage race was run as a UCI 2.1 category in six stages starting in Glasgow on 30 August and finishing in London on 4 September:

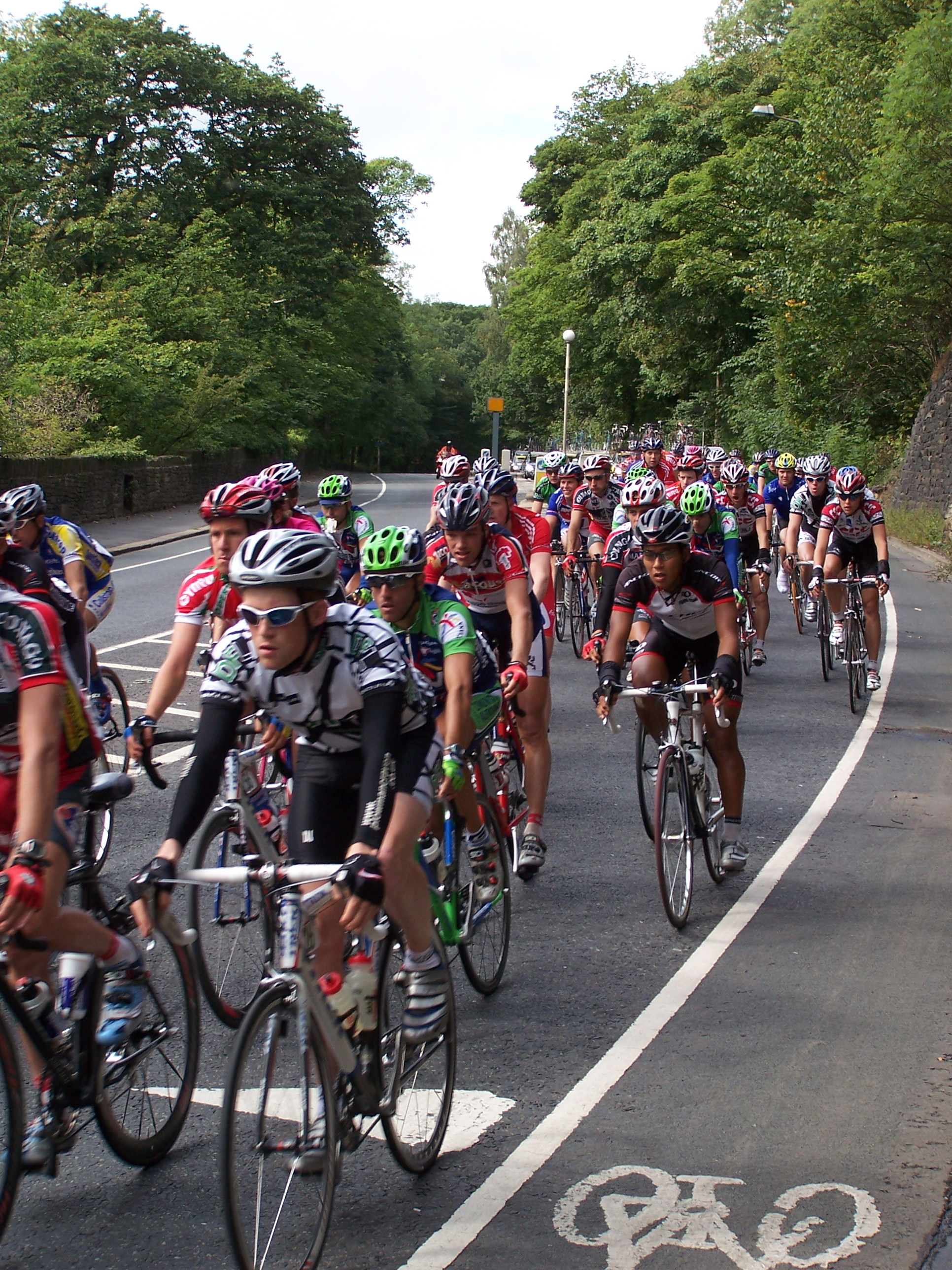
Stage 3 of the 2005 race passing through Honley, near Huddersfield

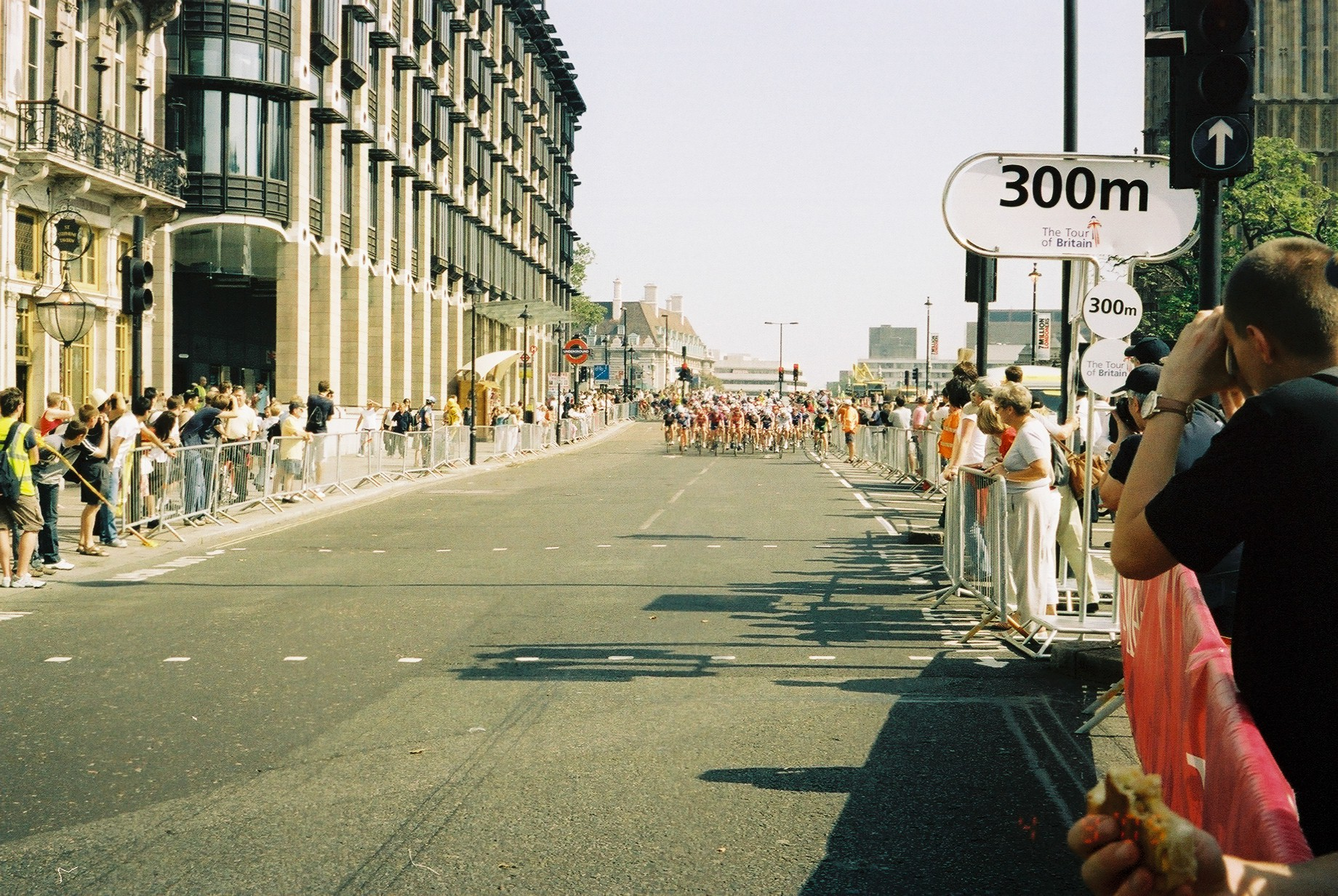
Final stage: view of the peloton

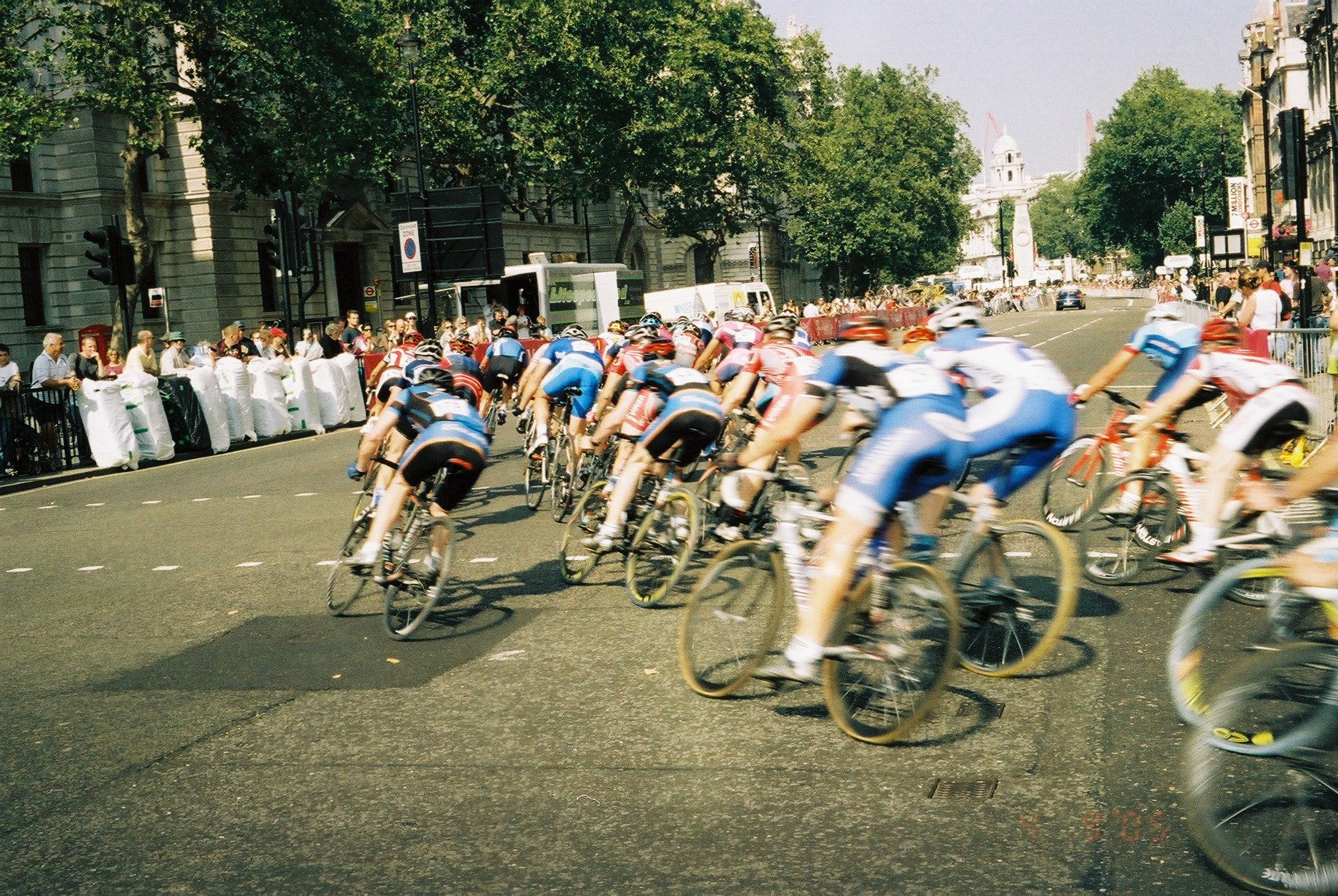
Final stage: peloton rounding a corner in Westminster

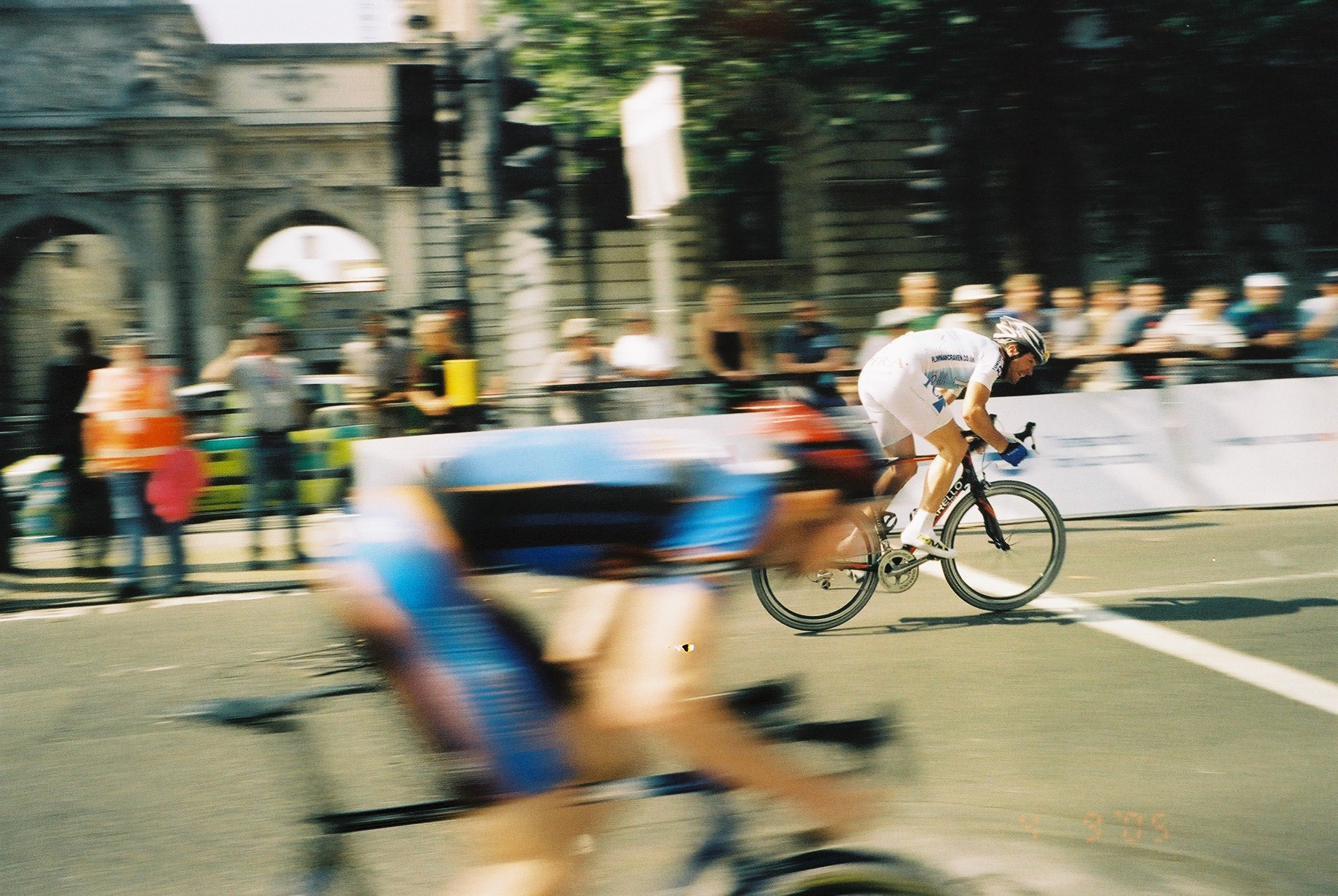
Final stage:

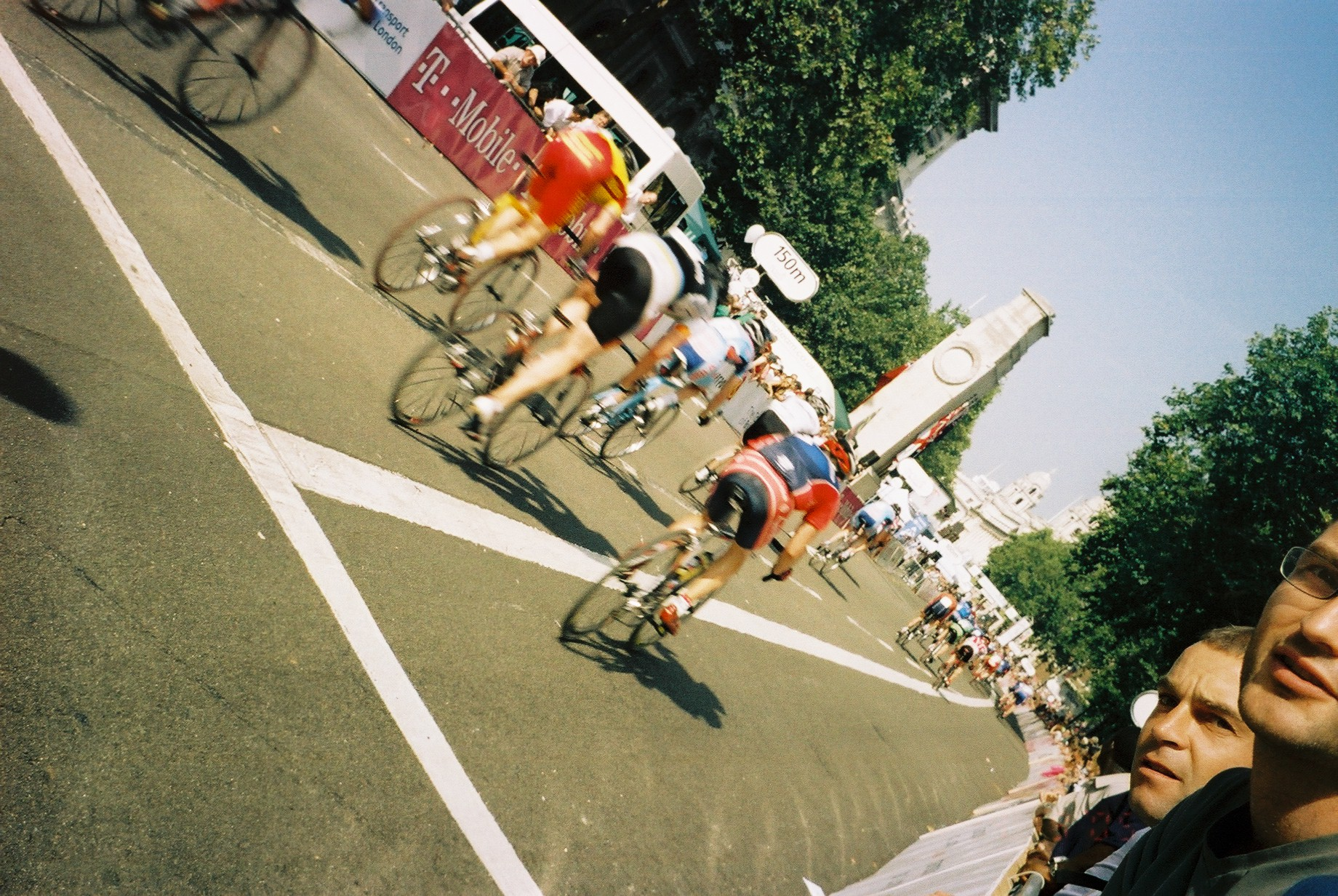
Final stage:

== Stages ==
=== Prelude ===
29 August: Glasgow

Mass participation ride followed by Glasgow criterium stage part of the Elite Circuit series.

=== Stage 1 ===
30 August: Glasgow to Castle Douglas, 185 km (115 mi)

	Cyclist	Nationality	Team	Time
1	Nick Nuyens	Belgium	QST	4h 24' 32"
2	Michael Blaudzun	Denmark	CSC	+ 0' 02"
3	Jeremy Hunt	United Kingdom	MRB	+ 0' 03"

=== Stage 2 ===
31 August: Carlisle to Blackpool, 160 km (99 mi)

	Cyclist	Nationality	Team	Time
1	Roger Hammond	United Kingdom	GBR	3h 58' 48"
2	Robin Sharman	United Kingdom	REC	+ 0' 05"
3	Mark Cavendish	United Kingdom	GBR	+ 0' 10"

=== Stage 3 ===
1 September: Leeds to Sheffield, 160 km (99 mi)

	Cyclist	Nationality	Team	Time
1	Luca Paolini	Italy	QST	4h 27' 24"
2	Bram Schmitz	Netherlands	TMO	s.t.
3	Russell Downing	United Kingdom	REC	+ 0' 02"

=== Stage 4 ===
2 September: Buxton to Nottingham, 195 km (121 mi)

	Cyclist	Nationality	Team	Time
1	Serguei Ivanov	Russia	TMO	4h 24' 17"
2	Evan Oliphant	United Kingdom	SCO	s.t.
3	Kazuo Inoue	Japan	BGT	s.t.

=== Stage 5 ===
3 September: Birmingham ITT, 4 km (2.5 mi)

	Cyclist	Nationality	Team	Time
1	Nick Nuyens	Belgium	QST	4' 54.06"
2	Kurt Asle Arvesen	Norway	CSC	+ 0.75"
3	Michael Blaudzun	Denmark	CSC	+ 1.21"

=== Final Stage (6) ===
4 September: London – London, 64 km (40 mi)

	Cyclist	Nationality	Team	Time
1	Luca Paolini	Italy	QST	1h 30' 54"
2	Enrico Degano	Italy	TBL	s.t.
3	Roger Hammond	United Kingdom	GBR	s.t.
