= Jonathan McEvoy =

British cyclist (born 1989)

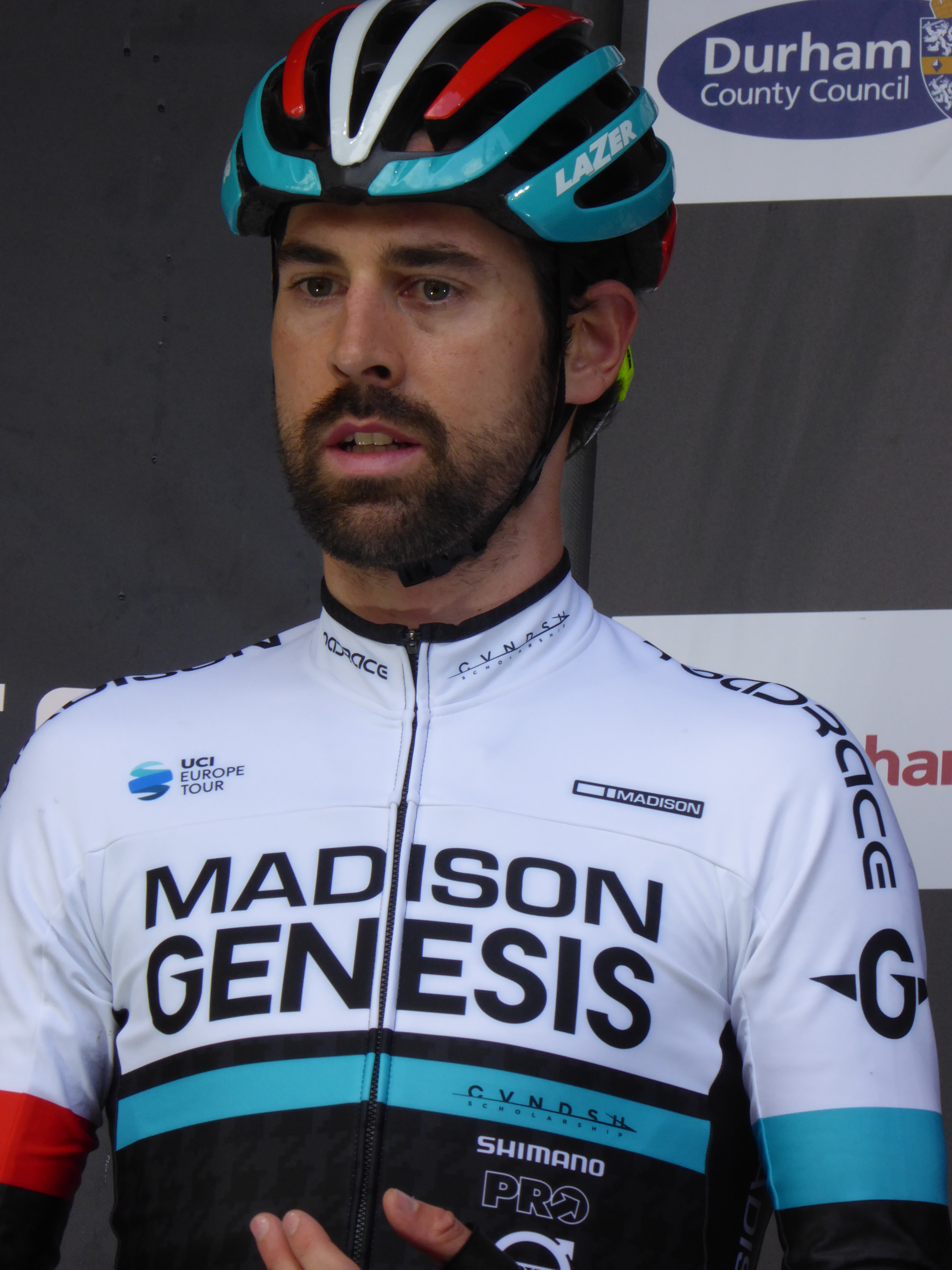
- McEvoy in 2017

Personal information
- Full name: Jonathan McEvoy
- Nickname: Johnny
- Born: 2 August 1989 (age 37) St Helens, Merseyside
- Height: 1.83 m (6 ft 0 in)
- Weight: 67 kg (148 lb)

Cycling career
- Sport: Cycling
- Current team: Retired
- Disciplines: Road; Cyclo-cross
- Role: Rider

Professional teams
- 2010–2011: Motorpoint–Marshalls Pasta
- 2012: Endura Racing
- 2013–2014: NetApp–Endura
- 2015–2016: NFTO
- 2017–2019: Madison Genesis

Jonathan McEvoy (born 2 August 1989 in St Helens, Merseyside) is a British former racing cyclist. As well as an accomplished road rider he is also a specialist in cyclo-cross and those skills almost certainly helped him obtain a top 100 finish at the 2014 Paris–Roubaix.

== Major results ==
2006
3rd Road race, National Junior Road Championships
2007
1st Overall Junior Tour of Wales
2nd Road race, National Junior Road Championships
2009
10th La Côte Picarde
2010
3rd Newport Nocturne
4th Clayton Velo Spring Classic
7th East Yorkshire Classic
2011
3rd Mumbai Cyclothon II
4th Rutland–Melton CiCLE Classic
4th East Yorkshire Classic
2012
1st Overall Tour Doon Hame

1st Stage 3

3rd Tour du Finistère
6th Overall Baltic Chain Tour
6th Geoff Bewley Memorial Cross
2015
1st Hitter Road Race
2nd Wales Open Criterium
4th Circuit race, National Road Championships
4th Beaumont Trophy
4th Stafford GP
6th Grand Prix of Wales
2016
6th Chorley Grand Prix
2017
5th Rutland–Melton CiCLE Classic
8th Beaumont Trophy
