= Richard Handley =

British cyclist

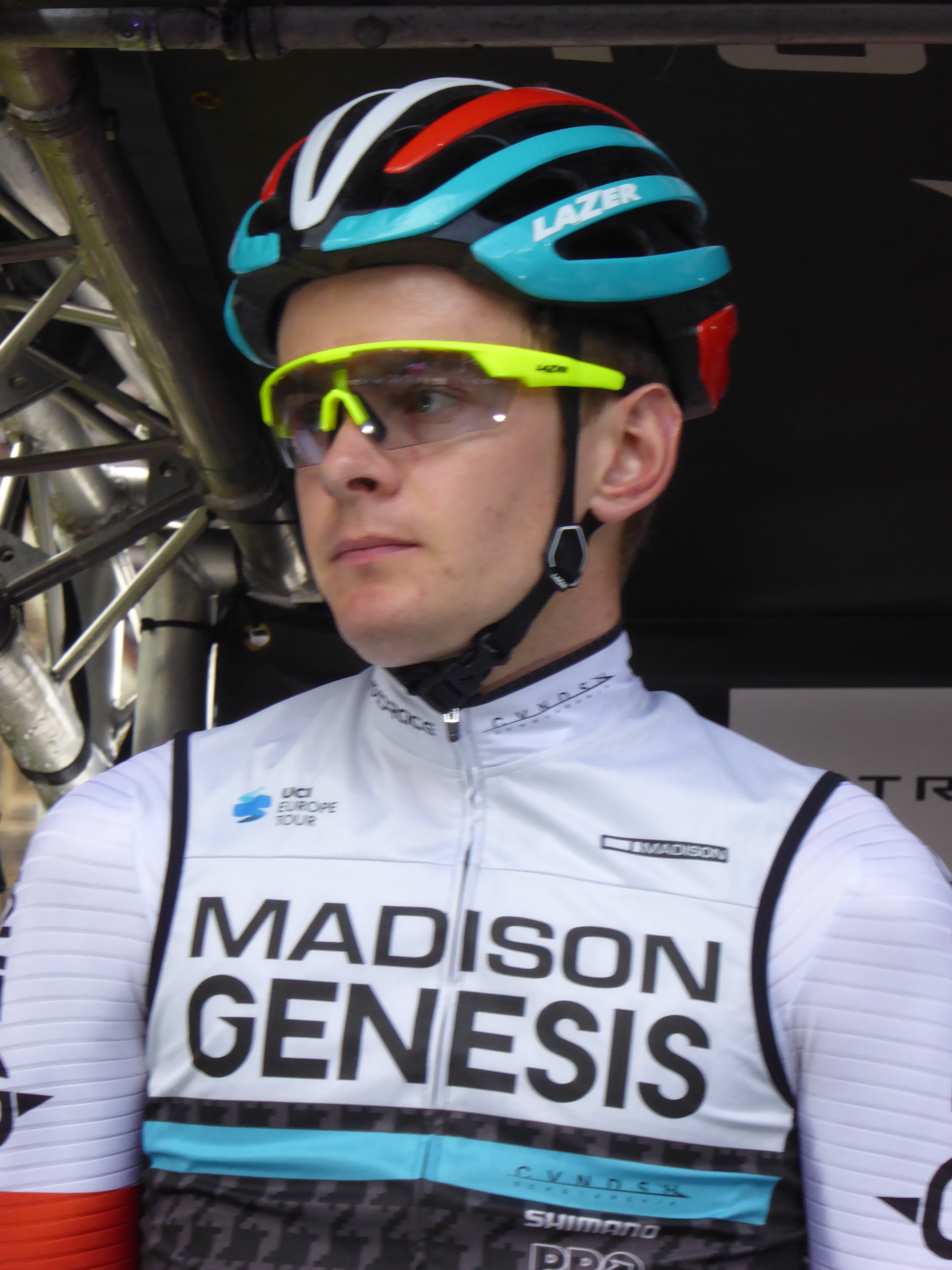
- Handley during the 2017 Tour Series

Personal information
- Full name: Richard Handley
- Born: 1 September 1990 (age 36) Wigan, England
- Height: 1.80 m (5 ft 11 in)
- Weight: 61.5 kg (136 lb; 9.68 st)

Cycling career
- Sport: Cycling
- Current team: Retired
- Discipline: Road
- Role: Rider
- Rider type: All-rounder

Professional teams
- 2010–2011: Team Raleigh
- 2012–2015: Rapha Condor–Sharp
- 2016: ONE Pro Cycling
- 2017–2019: Madison Genesis

Richard Handley (born 1 September 1990) is a British former professional road and track racing cyclist, who rode professionally between 2010 and 2019.

== Biography ==
Handley was born in Wigan.

== Major results ==
2009
4th Time trial, National Under-23 Road Championships
2012
Vuelta Ciclista a León

1st Points classification
1st Stage 5

3rd Time trial, National Under-23 Road Championships
4th Overall Tour Doon Hame
5th Overall Rás Tailteann

1st Young rider classification

9th Clayton Velo Spring Classic
2013
1st Clayton Velo Spring Classic
3rd Ryedale Grand Prix
4th Overall Rás Tailteann
6th Grand Prix des Marbriers
2014
1st Ryedale Grand Prix
1st Stage 2 Tour de Korea
5th Beaumont Trophy
7th Overall Mzansi Tour

1st Prologue (TTT)

10th Grand Prix des Marbriers
2015
1st Round 5 - Durham, Tour Series
5th Overall Tour de Korea
5th Hitter Road Race
8th Chorley Grand Prix
10th Overall Tour de Yorkshire
2016
5th Time trial, National Road Championships
7th Overall Sibiu Cycling Tour
