= James Gullen =

British bicycle racer

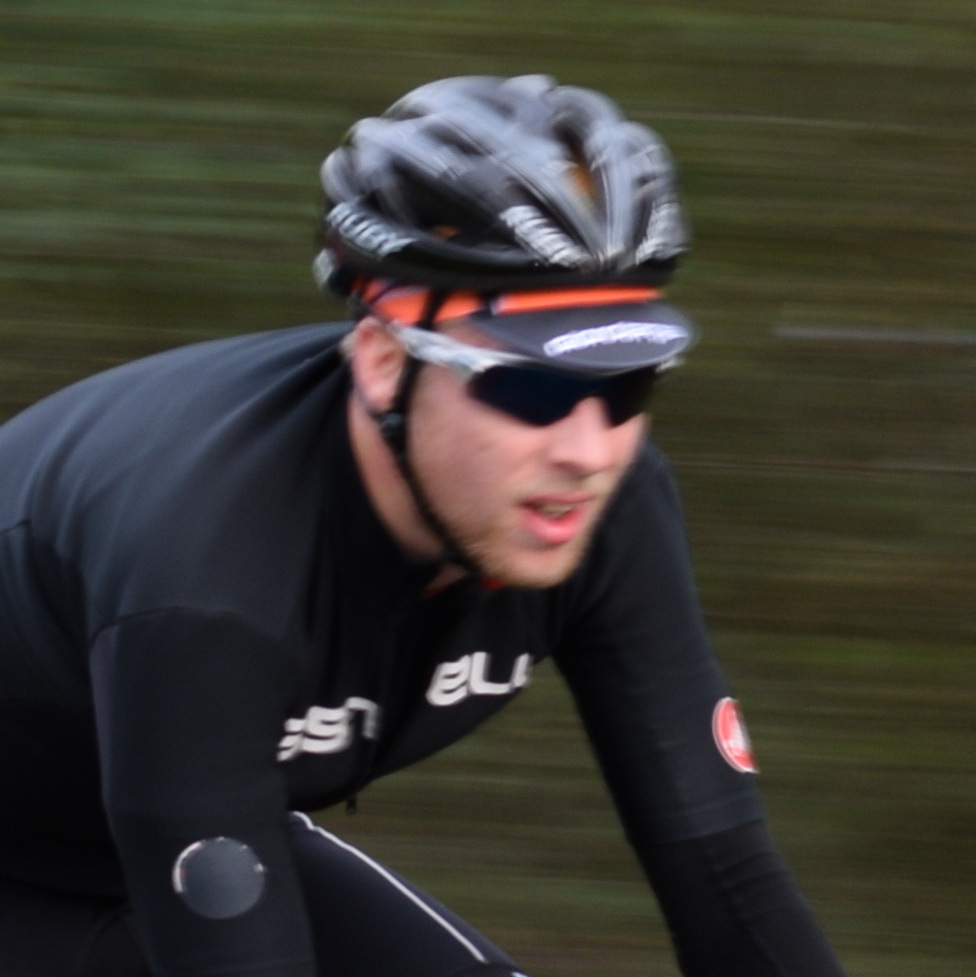
- Gullen in 2014

Personal information
- Born: 15 October 1989 (age 37) Kippax, Yorkshire

Cycling career
- Sport: Cycling
- Current team: JLT–Condor
- Discipline: Road
- Role: Rider
- Rider type: All-rounder

Amateur teams
- 2007–2008: Scarborough Paragon CC
- 2009: Yorkshire Velo
- 2010–2011: Teamwallis Racing Team
- 2012: SportGrub Cycling Team
- 2013: Hope Factory Racing
- 2015: Velosure Starley Primal

Professional teams
- 2014: Velosure–Giordana
- 2016: Pedal Heaven
- 2017–: JLT–Condor

James "Guzza" Gullen (born 15 October 1989) is an English racing cyclist from Yorkshire who rides for JLT–Condor.

== Career ==
Gullen began his racing career in his native Yorkshire, however he often credits his success to the brutal conditions at the famed Salt Ayre World Champs in Lancashire. Gullen has a host of victories to his name including GC wins in the Tour of the North and notable National B races. James’ most famed discipline is undoubtedly the Time Trial, with numerous victories and strong placings at national events. Gullen truly carved his name into the Mount Rushmore of cycling history by riding an 18.16 10 mile TT, an achievement which at the time was the 5th fastest ever. Gullen has also written his name into cycling folklore by claiming 777 victories on the North West's most famous Strava segments.

Throughout his young career Gullen has enjoyed corporate support from a variety of cycling sponsors including Hope, Pinarello, Rotor and Starley. Gullen's successes have also brought about a number of private sponsors including Lambert and Butler, Ruddles and The Barn coffee shop of Scorton, Lancashire.

In the winter of 2013, Gullen led a revolution in the North West cycling scene which saw numerous cyclists join specially organised winter teams. Gullen began this revolution by forming Team Hustle, he then went on to ride for Team Gabba, and was recently announced as team captain for a newly established team, Big Northern Setup, a team which promises to aid riders of Northern heritage through their winter training.

== Major results ==
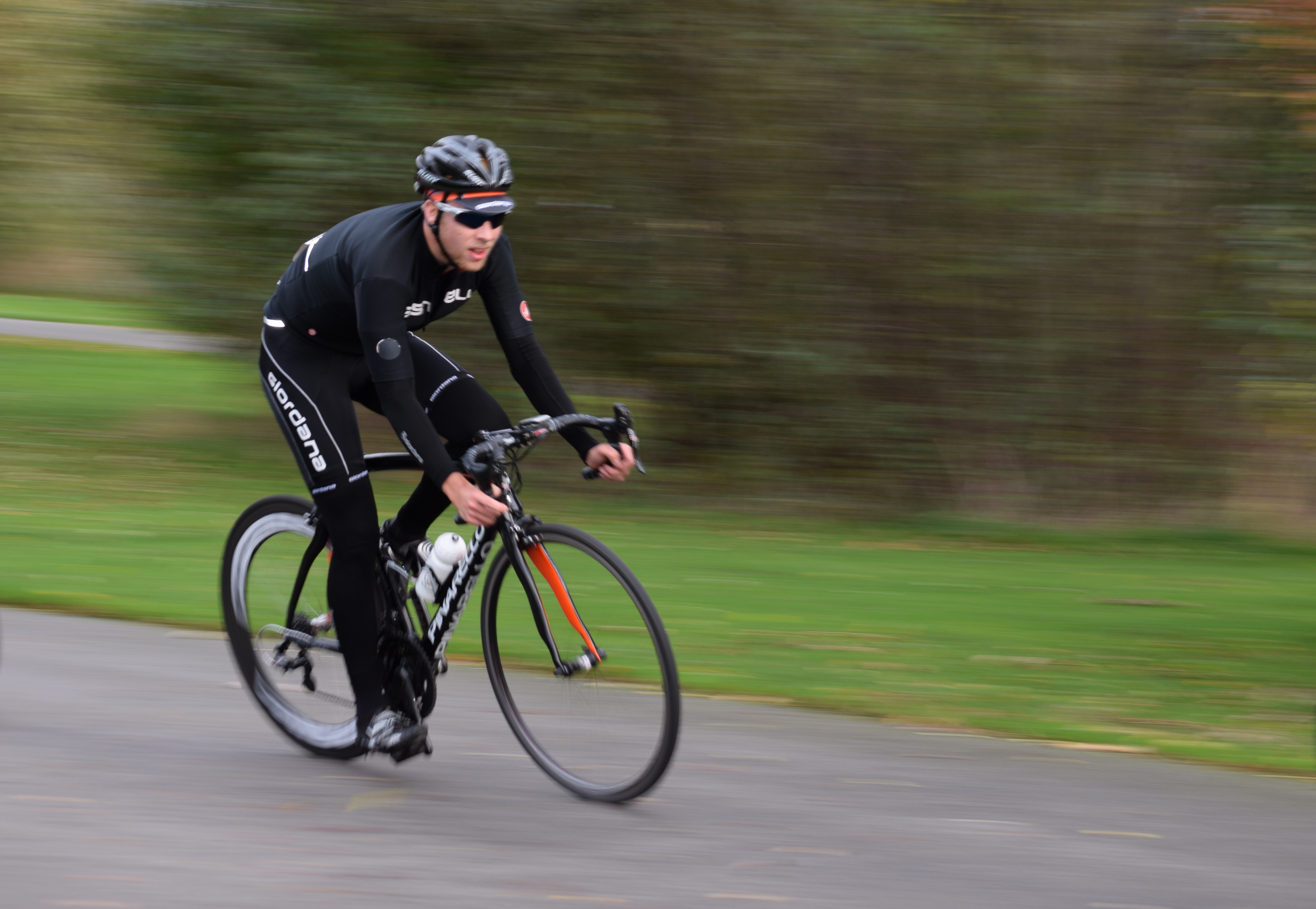
James Gullen at Lancaster University CC's Points Grabber Race

2011
1st Overall Morecambe Two-Day
2012
2nd Overall Holme Valley Wheelers Two-Day

1st Stage 2 (ITT)

2013
1st Jim Rogers Memorial Road Race
2nd British National Hill Climb Championships
2nd Otley CC Two-stage Hill-Climb
3rd West Pennine RC 14 Mile Hilly Time Trial
2014
1st Out of the Saddle Road Race
1st Overall Tour of the North
1st Nelson Wheelers Hilly 50
1st John May Memorial Road Race
1st North West Regional Road Race Championships
2015
2nd Out of the Saddle Road Race
2nd York Cycleworks Elite Road Race
3rd North West Regional Road Race Championships
2016
1st Jim Rogers Memorial Road Race
1st Stage 3 An Post Ras
2nd Time trial, National Road Championships
2017
1st Overall An Post Ras
1st Stage 2 Tour de Taiwan
2nd Beaumont Trophy
3rd Time trial, National Road Championships
2018
5th Time trial, National Road Championships
