= Tour of South Africa =

Race details
- Date: February
- Region: South Africa
- Discipline: Road
- Competition: UCI Africa Tour
- Type: stage race

History
- First edition: 2011
- Editions: 1 (2011)
- Final edition: 2011
- First winner: Kristian House (GBR)
- Most wins: No repeat winners
- Final winner: Kristian House (GBR)

The Tour of South Africa was a stage cycling race in South Africa that was only held once, in 2011. It was part of UCI Africa Tour as a 2.2 event.

The race took place over eight days, and included seven stages.

== Winners ==
Year	Country	Rider	Team
2011	Great Britain	Kristian House	Rapha Condor–Sharp
