= Jack Rootkin-Gray =

British cyclist

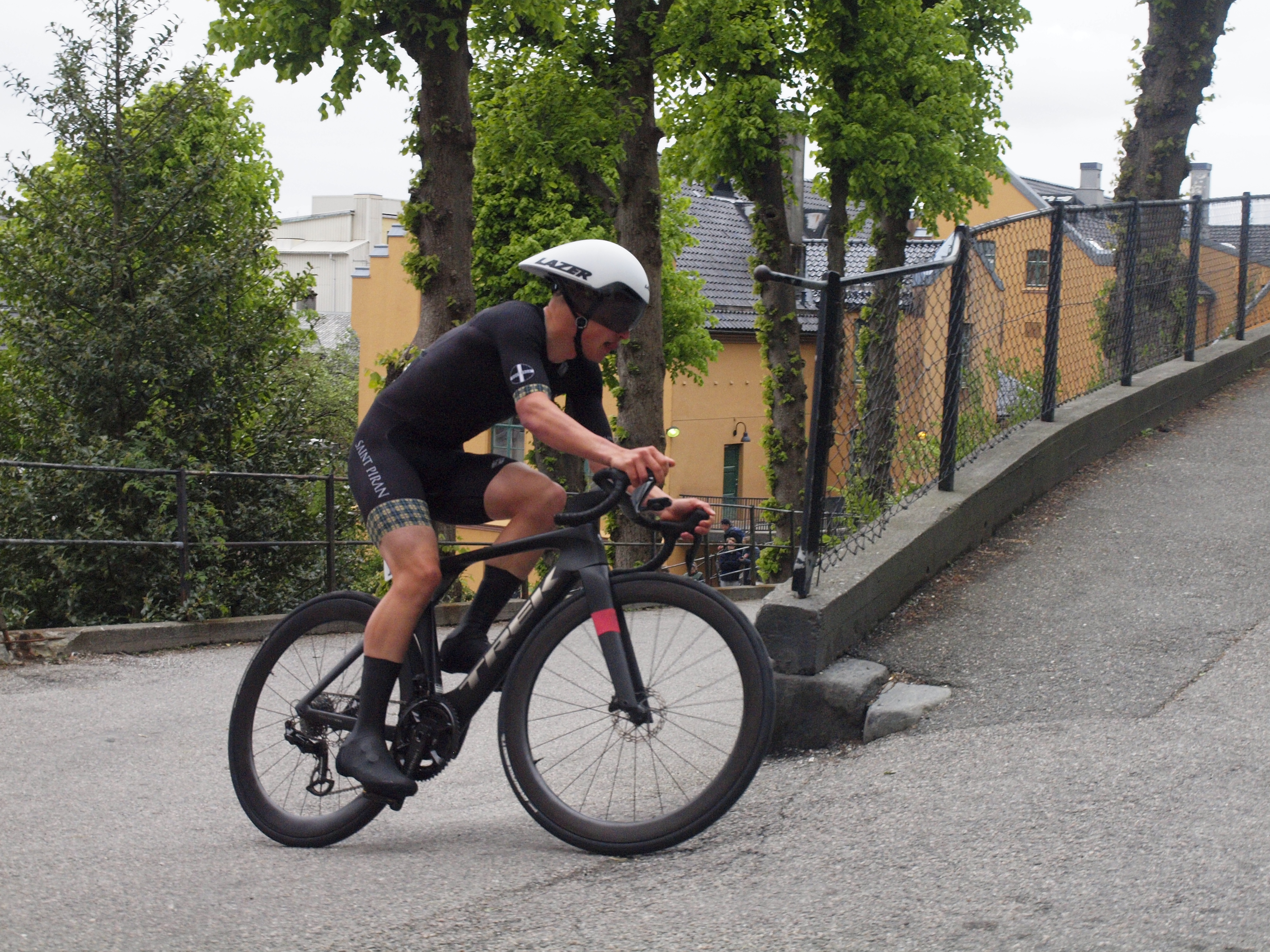
- Rootkin-Gray at the 2023 Tour of Norway

Personal information
- Born: 5 November 2002 (age 23) London, England
- Height: 1.78 m (5 ft 10 in)
- Weight: 67 kg (148 lb)

Cycling career
- Sport: Cycling
- Current team: Swatt Club
- Discipline: Road
- Role: Rider
- Rider type: Puncheur

Amateur teams
- 2008–2019: Solihull CC
- 2020: Z Junior Cycling Team
- 2021–2022: GB Cycling Senior Academy
- 2022: Team Inspired

Professional teams
- 2022: Saint Piran (stagiaire)
- 2023: Saint Piran
- 2024–2025: EF Education–EasyPost
- 2026-: Swatt Club

Jack Rootkin-Gray (born 5 November 2002) is a British road cyclist, who currently rides for UCI Continental team Swatt Club.

In September 2023, he signed a two-year contract with UCI WorldTeam EF Education–EasyPost for the following season.

== Major results ==
2019
4th Overall Sint-Martinusprijs Kontich

1st Young rider classification
1st Stage 1 (TTT)

2020
3rd Kuurne–Brussels–Kuurne Juniors
2022
1st Beaumont Trophy
1st GP Dr. Eugeen Roggeman Stekene
2nd Grasscrete GP
4th Lancaster GP
5th Grote Prijs Rik Van Looy
6th Overall Kreiz Breizh Elites
7th Rutland–Melton CiCLE Classic
10th Omloop Mandel-Leie-Schelde
2023
1st Ringerike GP
1st Perfs Pedal Race
1st Stage 3 Grand Prix Jeseníky
2nd Beaumont Trophy
3rd Lincoln GP
3rd Sundvolden GP
3rd Lancaster GP
4th Road race, UCI Road World Under-23 Championships
4th Overall Olympia's Tour
