= Tom Moses =

British bicycle racer

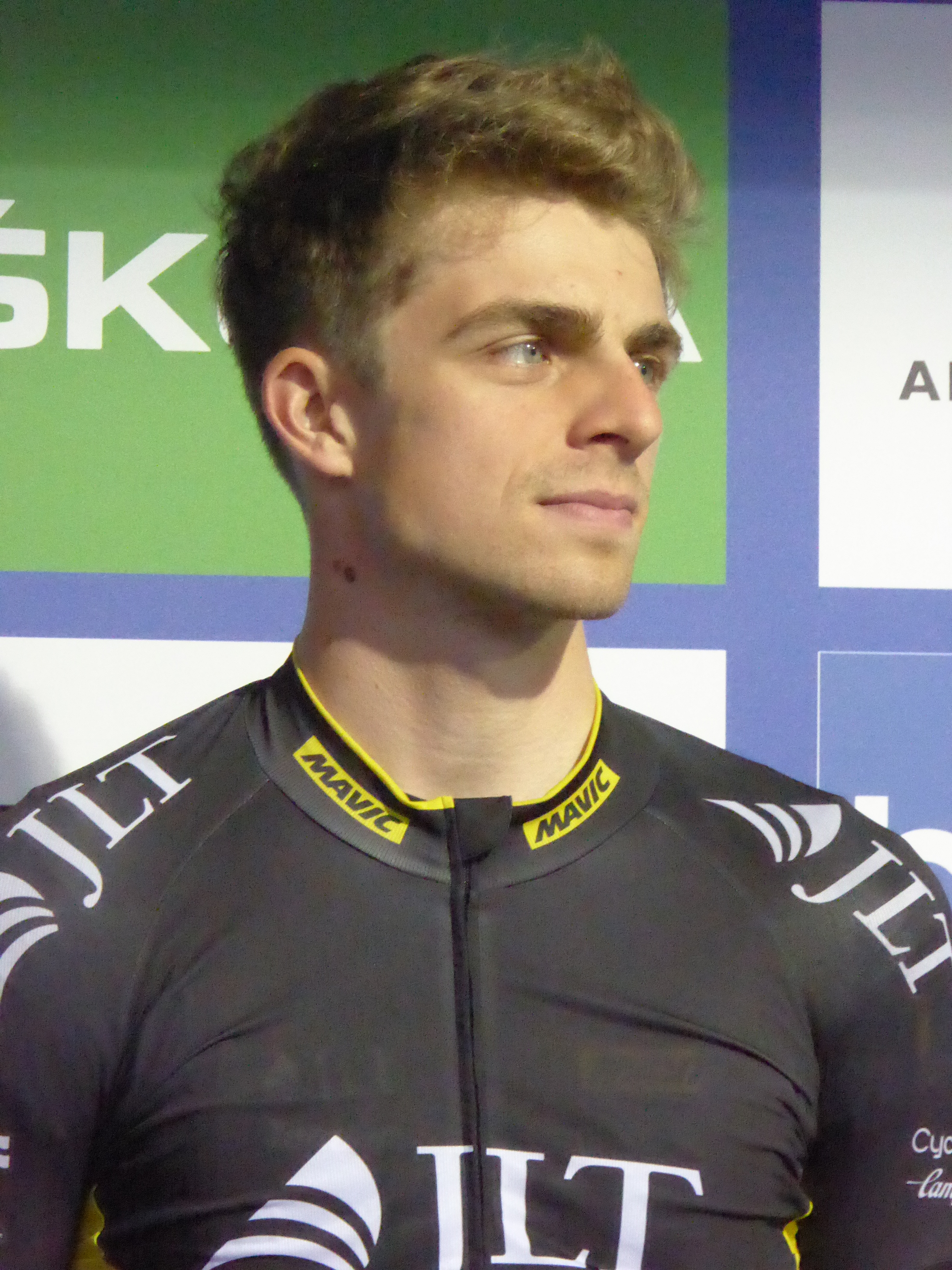
- Moses at the 2016 Tour of Britain.

Personal information
- Full name: Thomas Craven Moses
- Nicknames: Mono, Moses, Overchuté
- Born: 3 May 1992 (age 34) Oakworth, England

Cycling career
- Sport: Cycling
- Discipline: Road
- Role: Rider

Professional teams
- 2013: Team Raleigh
- 2014–2018: Rapha Condor–JLT
- 2019: Madison Genesis

Thomas Craven Moses (born 3 May 1992) is a British former professional cyclist, who competed professionally between 2013 and 2019. After retiring from cycling, Moses retrained as a tree surgeon. and cycling coach for British based coaching company, Rowe & King .

== Major results ==
2010
6th Paris–Roubaix Juniors
2011
1st Roy Thame Cup
2nd Madison (with Jon Mould), National Track Championships
2013
3rd Road race, National Under-23 Road Championships
9th Paris–Camembert
2014
1st Rutland–Melton International CiCLE Classic
1st Stage 1 Tour de Normandie
5th Overall Tour of the Reservoir
2015
2nd Ryedale Grand Prix
2016
4th Overall Tour of the Reservoir

1st Stage 1

2017
5th Overall Tour of the Reservoir

1st Stage 2

2018
1st Overall Tour of the Reservoir

1st Stage 2
