= 2010 Tour de Wallonie =

Race details
- Dates: 24–28 July 2010
- Stages: 5
- Distance: 899.1 km (558.7 mi)
- Winning time: 21h 50' 07"

Results
	Winner	Russell Downing (GBR)
	Second	Marco Marcato (ITA)
	Third	Laurent Mangel (FRA)

The 2010 Tour de Wallonie was the 37th edition of the Tour de Wallonie cycle race and was held from 24 to 28 July 2010. The race started in Mouscron and finished in Welkenraedt. The race was won by Russell Downing.

== General classification ==
Final general classification

Rank	Rider	Time
1	Russell Downing (GBR)	21h 50' 07"
2	Marco Marcato (ITA)	+ 2"
3	Laurent Mangel (FRA)	+ 3"
4	Julien Simon (FRA)	+ 7"
5	Maxime Vantomme (BEL)	+ 9"
6	Jan Bakelants (BEL)	+ 11"
7	Kristof Vandewalle (BEL)	+ 12"
8	Arthur Vichot (FRA)	+ 13"
9	Steven Van Vooren (BEL)	+ 13"
10	Massimo Codol (ITA)	+ 13"
