= Stafford GP =

Criterium cycle race

Race details
- Date: Late June/Early July
- Region: Stafford, Midlands, United Kingdom
- English name: Stafford GP
- Discipline: Road race
- Competition: BC Elite Circuit Series
- Type: Criterium
- Organiser: Leadout Cycling Ltd
- Race director: Paul Rowlands

History
- First edition: 1982
- Editions: 7
- First winner: Roger Willett (GBR)
- Most wins: Steve Joughin (GBR) (x4)
- Most recent: Graham Briggs (GBR)

The Stafford GP is a criterium cycle race held in the town of Stafford owned and organised by Leadout Cycling Ltd under the technical regulations of British Cycling. Since 2010 it has been part of British Cycling’s Elite Circuit Race Series.

== History ==
The origins of today’s Stafford GP go back to the Stafford Town Centre Races held in the 1980s. Like today, criteriums were an important part of professional cycling. Whilst not part of the televised Kelloggs, the races attracted a star-studded field and huge crowds. Five editions were held during the 1980s.

The first edition of the race was won by Roger Willett from Finchfield, who later rode for the Great Britain senior team.

The undisputed king of the Stafford Town Centre Races was Steve Joughin. As a local rider who settled in Stoke-on-Trent at the start of his professional career and riding for local sponsors Moducel. Joughin was undefeated in the 3 editions of the race in which he competed.

The last Stafford Town Centre race took place in 1987 and was won by Mark Walsham.

== Today ==
A criterium race was revived in Stafford in 2010 by Leadout Cycling Ltd. The Stafford GP has been part of the British Cycling Elite Circuit Race Series, a series of races held usually in mid week across towns in England. Since its reincarnation there have been 8 editions of the race. The 2010 race was won by Olympic champion Ed Clancy. The 2011 edition was won by Australian Dean Windsor. The 2012 saw Graham Briggs take the victory - one of his 5 victories on the way to the 2012 Elite Circuit Race Series title. In 2013 the race became part of the Staffordshire Cycling Festival. The last time the race took place in Stafford was 2018.

=== 2018 ===
1. Rory Townsend Canyon Eisberg
2. Charles Page Canyon Eisberg
3. Andrew Tennant Canyon Eisberg

=== 2017 ===
Not held

=== 2016 ===
1. Albert Torres (Raleigh GAC)
2. Felix English (Madison Genesis)
3. Sebastian Mora Vedri (Raleigh GAC)

=== 2015 ===
1. Jonathan Mould One Pro Cycling
2. Adam Blythe Orica Greenedge
3. Morgan Kneisky Raleigh GAC

=== 2014 ===
1. Luke Grivell-Mellor (GBR) Rapha Condor JLT 00:53:57
2. Edward Clancy MBE (GBR) Rapha Condor JLT 00:00:01
3. Chris Opie Rapha (GBR) Condor JLT 00:00:17

=== 2013 ===
1. Tom Scully (NZL) Team Raleigh
2. Graham Briggs (GBR) Team Raleigh
3. George Atkins (GBR) 100%ME

=== 2012 ===
1. Graham Briggs (GBR) Team Raleigh-GAC
2. Rico Rogers (NZL) Node4-Giordana
3. Matt Cronshaw (GBR) Node4-Giordana

=== 2011 ===
1. Dean Windsor (AUS) Rapha Condor - Sharp
2. Dean Downing (GBR) Rapha Condor - Sharp
3. Simon Gaywood (GBR) Corley Cycles

=== 2010 ===
1. Ed Clancy (GBR) Motorpoint
2. Ian Wilkinson (GBR) Endura
3. Dean Downing (GBR) Rapha Condor - Sharp
