= Kristian House =

British former racing cyclist (born 1979)

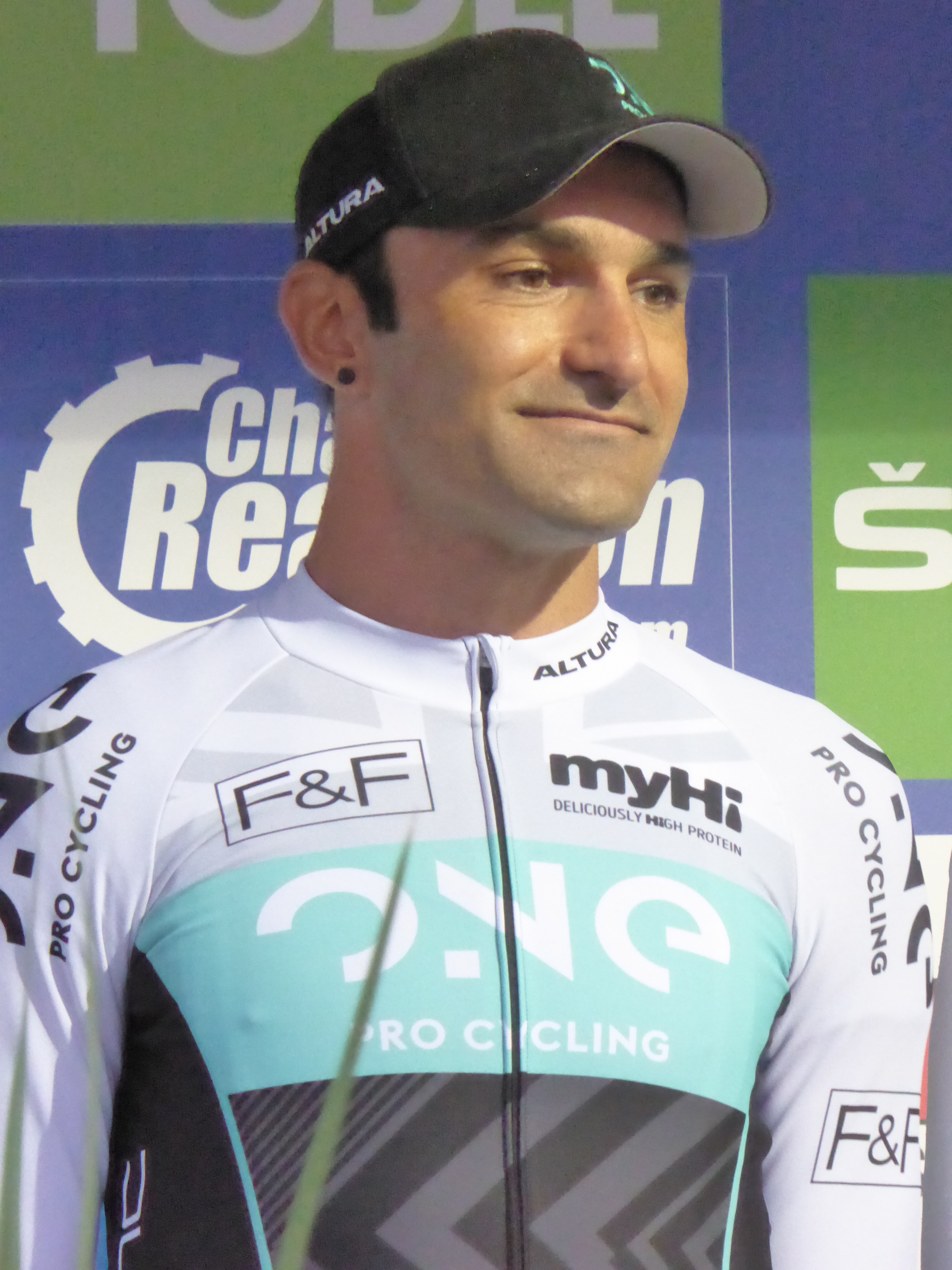
- House at the 2016 Tour of Britain

Personal information
- Full name: Kristian House
- Nickname: The Dude
- Born: 6 October 1979 (age 47) Canterbury, Kent, United Kingdom

Cycling career
- Sport: Cycling
- Discipline: Road
- Role: Rider
- Rider type: Breakaway specialist

Amateur teams
- 2003: Team PCA Orbea Veneto Zeus
- 2003: Colombia–Selle Italia (stagiaire)
- 2004: Bendigo
- 2005: Midex T-Mobile

Professional teams
- 2006: Recycling.co.uk
- 2007: Navigators Insurance
- 2008–2015: Rapha Condor–Recycling.co.uk
- 2016–2017: ONE Pro Cycling

Major wins
- One-day races and Classics National Road Race Championships (2009)

Kristian House (born 6 October 1979 in Canterbury, England) is a British former racing cyclist who rode for the JLT–Condor team from 2008 to 2015, and joined ONE Pro Cycling in 2016. He was the 2009 British Road Race Champion. He has raced in Europe and Australia. He rode for Great Britain in UCI World Cup track events. In 2006, he rode for the Recycling.co.uk team and in 2007 he signed for Navigators Insurance.

Kristian House was born in Britain but moved to the United States as a child, growing up initially in New Jersey and then Austin, Texas, where he began racing as a junior. At 17 he began racing in Belgium, where he stayed for two-and-a-half years. He was selected for the Great Britain Under-23 squad at the UCI Road World Championships in 2000 and 2001, although he did not compete in 2000 after crashing out of Paris-Tours at the same corner as Jan Ullrich. After considering retiring from the sport at the age of 23 due to not securing a professional contract, he joined the Team GB track endurance squad after being introduced to team coach Simon Jones by John Herety, the manager of the British road team.

After representing Britain in road and track world championships, he concentrated on road-racing in 2006 after joining the Recycling.co.uk team, now managed by Herety, and won ten races in Europe and Tasmania. They included Ireland's FBD Insurance Rás, where he overhauled Danny Pate. After one year with the American UCI Professional Continental team Navigators, House returned to the UK to link up with Herety again at Rapha Condor–Recycling.co.uk.

In 2009 House became national road race champion in Abergavenny, having finished in the top five six times previously: initially joining the breakaway to provide anticipated support to his planned team leaders for the race, Chris Newton and Tom Southam, House was part of a trio alongside Dan Lloyd and Peter Kennaugh that caught race leader Chris Froome with 800 metres to go, before House won the sprint for the line. He remained with the Rapha Condor team until 2016, when he joined ONE Pro Cycling. In April 2017 he announced that he would retire from competition at the end of the season. In December of that year, JLT-Condor announced that House would be rejoining the team for the following year, taking up a role as the team's performance manager.

House was granted the Freedom of the City of London in 2014.

== Major results ==
2000
1st Stars of Tomorrow Road Race
1st Essen–Diksmuide
1st Tielt
1st Wervik
1st Hollian
2nd Geluveld
2nd Westkerke
3rd Poperinge
3rd Leke–Diksmuide
2001
1st Nieuwekerken
1st Rumbeke
1st GP Harelbeke
1st Boezinge
2nd Chase Classic
2002
1st Overall Surrey 5-Day

1st Stage 2

2nd National Individual Pursuit Championships
3rd Castletown criterium
5th Manx Trophy
9th Havant International GP
2003
1st Stage 6b Herald Sun Tour
1st Western Australia Criterium Championships
1st Eemegem
2nd Castle criterium
2nd Dougland criterium
2nd Geeling – Botanic Gardens criterium
3rd Armadale criterium
3rd Nieuwekerken
3rd National Madison Championships
4th Overall Tour of Queensland
5th Manx Trophy
2004
2nd ECCA Festival senior road race
3rd Port Arlington Bay criterium
10th Overall Tour of Queensland
2005
1st Bendigo criterium
1st Kortrijk GP
1st Overall Tour of the South
1st KOM Cranbourne Chase stage race
2nd Omloop Van De Grensstreek
2nd GP Dadizele
2nd Ingelmunster
3rd Guildford Criterium
2006
1st Overall FBD Insurance Rás

1st Stage 6 (TTT)

1st Overall Girvan cycle race

1st Stage 2

1st Lincoln GP
1st Stage 3 Tour de Bretagne Cycliste
8th Overall Boucles de la Mayenne
8th Overall Tour of Southland

1st Stage 9

2008
2nd East Yorkshire Classic
2nd Overall Tour of the Reservoir
7th Overall Grand Prix Cycliste de Gemenc
9th Overall Tour du Loir-et-Cher
2009
1st Road race, National Road Championships
2nd Rochdale Grand Prix Circuit Race
6th Overall Mi-Août Bretonne
6th Overall Girvan Three Day

1st Points classification

10th Overall Tour of Britain
2010
1st Day 2 La Primavera at Lago Vista
1st Stage 6 Tour of Japan
1st Richmond GP
3rd Overall Mi-Août Bretonne
2011
1st Overall Tour of South Africa

1st Stage 1

1st Stage 5 Vuelta Ciclista a León
2nd Grand Prix des Marbriers
3rd Roy Thame Cup
6th Road race, National Road Championships
2012
1st Durham Stage Tour Series
1st Mountains classification Tour of Britain
3rd Lincoln GP
6th Tobago Cycling Classic
2013
1st Durham Stage Tour Series
5th Overall Tour du Loir-et-Cher
6th Road race, National Road Championships
Overall Combativity award, Tour of Britain
2014
1st Beaumont Trophy
1st Sheffield Grand Prix
1st Prologue (TTT) Mzansi Tour
2015
1st Milk Race
1st Round 4 – Motherwell, Tour Series
5th Grand Prix des Marbriers
2016
1st Stage 3 New Zealand Cycle Classic
1st Stage 7 Tour de Korea
