= Condor Cycles =

Bicycle manufacturer in England

Condor Cycles Ltd
- Type: Private
- Industry: Retail
- Founded: 1948; 78 years ago in London, England
- Founder: Monty Young
- Headquarters: London, United Kingdom
- Website: www.condorcycles.com

Condor Cycles is a bicycle manufacturer based on Gray's Inn Road in London. Condor Cycles was started in 1948 by Monty Young, providing bespoke bicycles which have been ridden by riders such as Tom Simpson, Bradley Wiggins, and Tao Geoghegan Hart. Condor bicycles have been ridden to World Championship gold medals and ridden in the Tour de France.

== Sponsorships ==
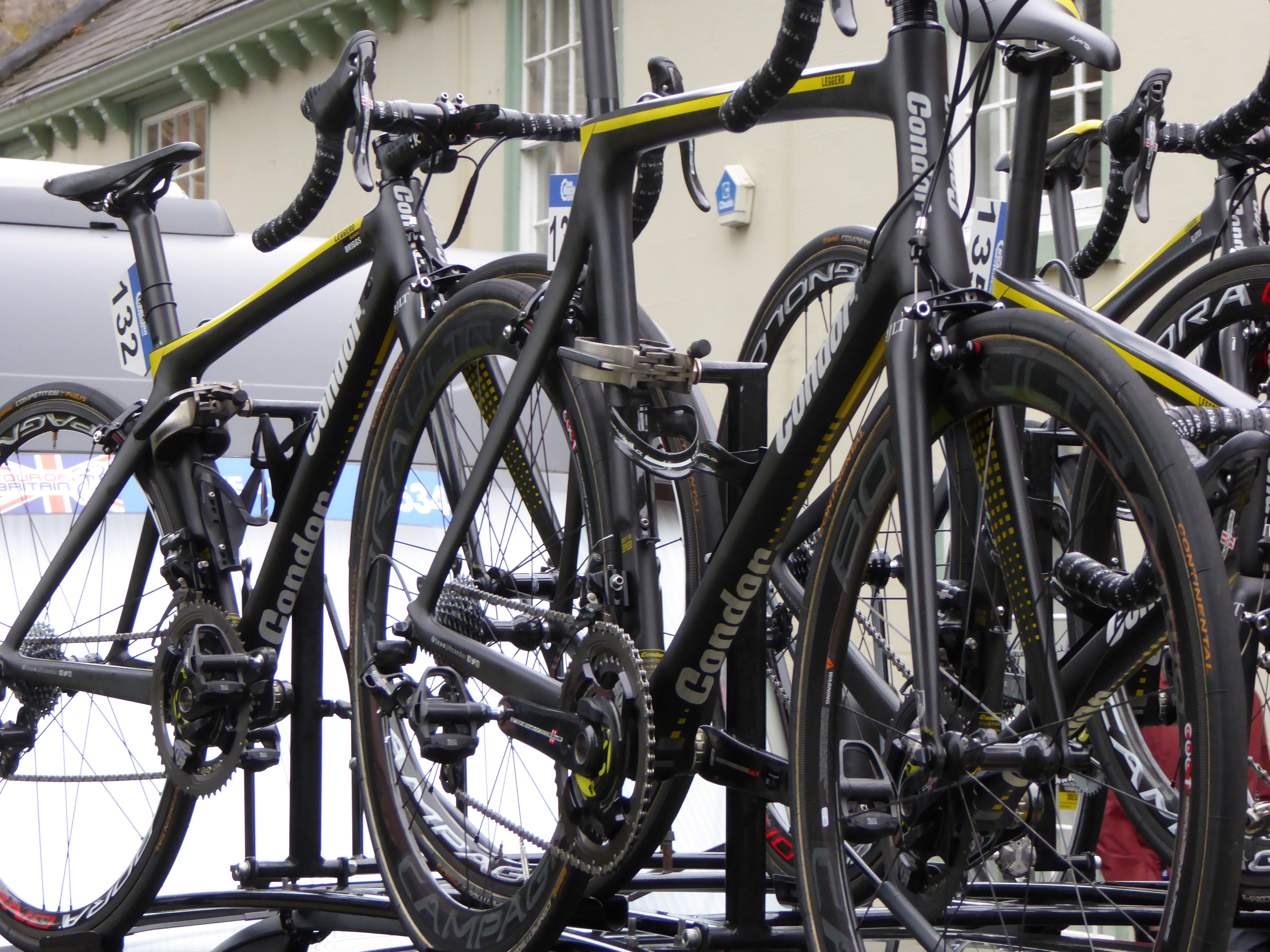
Condor bicycles, used by the JLT–Condor cycling team, at the 2016 Tour of Britain.

In 1986 Condor Cycles supported the Percy Bilton pro cycling team and in 1998 the Anglia Sport cycling team from which rider Gary Baker won several stages of the Milk Race.

Condor Cycles co-owned the UK-based cycling team Rapha Condor-JLT with sportswear and lifestyle brand Rapha. Rapha ended the sponsorship of the team and Condor Cycles took over the role as team owners renaming the team JLT-Condor presented by Mavic
