= Robin Sharman =

English racing cyclist (born 1979)

Personal information
- Full name: Robin Sharman
- Born: 8 December 1979 (age 46) England; United Kingdom

Cycling career
- Sport: Cycling
- Discipline: Road
- Role: Rider
- Rider type: Endurance

Professional teams
- 2005-2006: Recycling.co.uk - MG-XPower - Litespeed
- 2007: KFS-Special Vehicles/Sunday
- 2008-2009: Sigma Sport
- 2010: Basso Bikes
- 2011: Orbea-For Goodness Shakes!

Robin Sharman (born 8 December 1979) is an English road racing cyclist and coach from Repton, Derbyshire. He competed in the Under-23 road races at the UCI Road World Championships in 2000 and 2001. He represented England at the 2006 Commonwealth Games, competing in the road event but did not finish the race. In 2005 Rob road the elite road world championships in Madrid. In February 2009 Sharman was appointed Olympic Development Programme Coach for the Great Britain junior squad, following a year as a coach for British Cycling's Go Ride scheme in the East Midlands.

== Palmarès ==
2000
2nd British National Road Race Championships (Under 23)

2005
1st Overall Premier Calendar
2nd Stage 2, 2005 Tour of Britain

2006
1st East Midlands International Cicle Classic
2nd Overall Premier Calendar

2007
3rd Overall Premier Calendar

2011
4th Ryedale Grand Prix
