= Tour of the Reservoir =

Bicycle race in northern England

Race details
- Date: April (until 2016); July (2017)
- Region: Northumberland, England
- Discipline: Road
- Competition: Premier Calendar. National Road Series
- Type: Stage race
- Web site: www.tourofthereservoir.co.uk

History
- First edition: 1988
- Editions: 38 (as of 2020)
- Most wins: Dean Downing (GBR) (2 wins)
- Most recent: James Shaw (GBR)

The Tour of the Reservoir is a road bicycle race for Men and Women around Consett and Edmunbyers Derwent Reservoir, Northumberland in the north of England, part of the British Cycling National Road Series, formerly known as the Premier Calendar.

The event was known throughout the North of England as an early season Hardman's race due to its first week of April date. The race was based on a 12.4 mile clockwise route around Derwent Reservoir owned by Northumbria Water who were for many years the events sponsor. The private road up to and across the Dam Wall at the East end of the grounds were used to host the start and finish. The weather conditions often affected the dynamics of the race and the wind that raced across the surface of the water chilled riders even on a mild day. Combined with the constantly rolling profile the race usually became attritional during the first of five laps.

Its sole organiser was Mike Hodgson until his death in March 2020 from Covid-19.

As the race became more notorious, riders travelled from as far as Scotland to the North and South Yorkshire attracting such famous names as Wayne Randle, Mark Lovatt and Chris Young. The race was self financing until the decision that Durham Police would no longer fund the rolling road closure the event needed. As a short part of the course involved 1/4 mile onto the busy A68, the only option was to somehow find the financial resources to pay for the required Police cover. In the many years since, Hodgson never revealed where the money came from, but the strong rumours were that something was always found 'down the back of the sofa'.

The 2019 event saw the race split in 2 locations with Stage 1 starting in Edmunbyers, the home village of Hodgson and finishing on the Dam Wall of Northumbria Waters Derwent Reservoir from which the event took its name. Stage 2 saw a new start and finish as Hodgson was asked to make the event part of the 2020 Consett Festival, a week long calendar of events to commemorate the 40th closure of the towns Steel Works, the major employer in the area for years. This also coincided with it being 25 years since Project Genesis, the regeneration body that was formed in its wake was instated.

The event saw independently verified figures from two sources concluding a benefit to the local economy of over £1,000,000 to the local economy and over 10,000 spectators present to see the finish of the Mens race at the end of the day and Hodgson was finally satisfied that he had finally achieved the level he had always longed for and looked forward to the following year. He was taken ill three days into the first Covid-19 Lockdown and, after 10 days in Hexham General Hospital, died due to its effects.

In 2025 it resurfaced with a new organisational team who had been working since 2021 to bring the event back. It will be a single day event with the aim of returning to a 2-day for Open and Women riders in 2026.

== Winners ==
Year	Country	Rider	Team
2005	Great Britain	Dean Downing	Recycling.co.uk–MG X-Power
2006	Great Britain	Ben Greenwood	Recycling.co.uk
2007	Great Britain	Dean Downing	Recycling.co.uk
2008	Great Britain	Russell Downing	Pinarello Racing Team
2009	Great Britain	Andy Tennant	Team Halfords Bikehut
2010	Great Britain	Simon Richardson	Sigma Sport–Specialized
2011	Great Britain	Ian Bibby	Motorpoint Pro–Cycling Team
2012	Great Britain	Scott Thwaites	Endura Racing
2013	Great Britain	Evan Oliphant	Team Raleigh
2014	Great Britain	Alex Peters	Madison Genesis
2015	Great Britain	Erick Rowsell	Madison Genesis
2016	Great Britain	Joe Fry	Pedal Heaven
2017	Great Britain	Tom Stewart	ONE Pro Cycling
2018	Great Britain	Tom Moses	JLT–Condor
2019	Great Britain	James Shaw	Swift Carbon Pro Cycling
