= Russell Downing =

British road cyclist (born 1978)

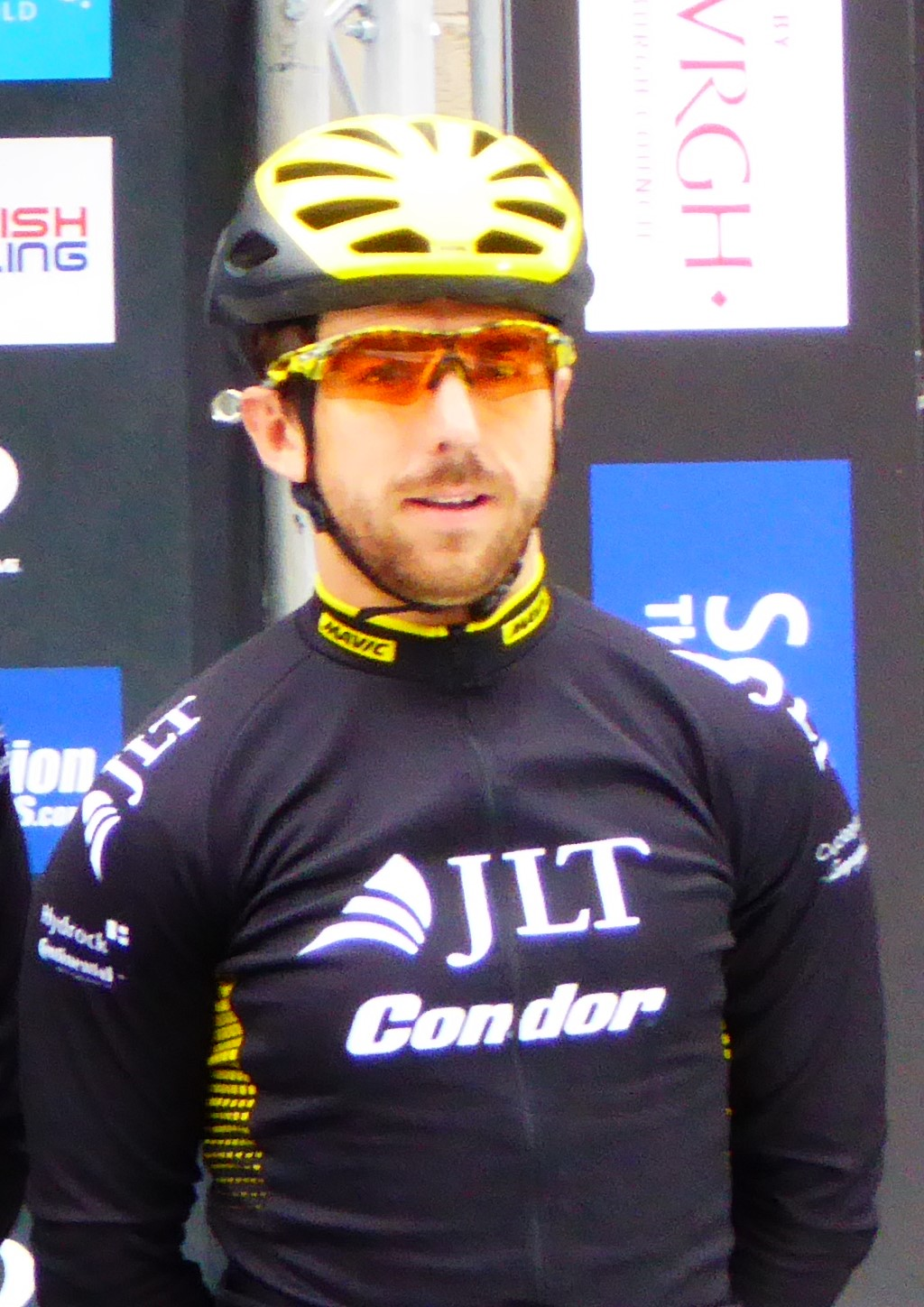

Personal information
- Full name: Russell Downing
- Born: 23 August 1978 (age 48) Rotherham, England
- Height: 1.71 m (5 ft 7 1/2 in)
- Weight: 64 kg (141 lb)

Cycling career
- Sport: Cycling
- Current team: Retired
- Disciplines: Road; Track
- Role: Rider
- Rider type: Sprinter

Amateur teams
- 1998: Brite Voice
- 2000: Miche Pena
- 2001: UVCA Troyes
- 2019: Giordana Cycling

Professional teams
- 1999–2001: Linda McCartney On Tour
- 2002: iTeamNova.com
- 2003: Time Life Repair
- 2004–2005: Recycling.co.uk–MG X-Power
- 2006: Driving Force Logistics
- 2007: Health Net–Maxxis
- 2008: Pinarello Racing Team
- 2009: CandiTV–Marshalls Pasta
- 2010–2011: Team Sky
- 2012: Endura Racing
- 2013: NetApp–Endura
- 2014: NFTO
- 2015: Cult Energy Pro Cycling
- 2016–2017: JLT–Condor
- 2018: Holdsworth

Major wins
- Stage races Tour of Ireland (2009) Tour de Wallonie (2010) One-day races and Classics National Road Race Championships (2005)

Russell Downing (born 23 August 1978) is an English former professional cyclist, who rode competitively between 1999 and 2019 for numerous teams, such as Team Sky and JLT–Condor. He is the younger brother of fellow cyclist Dean Downing, and both brothers competed largely on the UCI Continental Tour and in British Premier Calendar races.

== Career ==
Downing was born into a bike racing family: as well as his older brother, his father was also a bicycle racer. He was also a talented football player, playing with Rotherham United F.C.'s under-16s team, but Downing was convinced to become a professional cyclist by Milk Race winner Chris Walker, who Downing trained with during his late teens.

He was the winner of the British National Road Race Championships in 2005.

In addition to his national championships, he was also successful in some multi-stage races. His biggest victories came in the 2010 Tour de Wallonie, a 2.HC class event, as well as the 2009 Tour of Ireland.

For 2010 he signed a one-year contract with the new British Professional Team, Team Sky, and became the first Briton to win a stage for the team, picking up a win in the Critérium International. His contract was renewed for a further year, for the 2011 season. In November 2011 it was announced that his contract was not being renewed for a third year and he would join the British Continental Team Endura Racing. Following the merger of Endura with Team NetApp Downing joined the NetApp–Endura squad for 2013. In September 2013 it was announced that Russell and Dean Downing would join the new NFTO team for 2014. Russell Downing signed for the Cult Energy Pro Cycling team for the 2015 season, but returned to Britain with JLT–Condor for the 2016 season.

== Major results ==
=== Road ===
1997
2nd Road race, National Under-23 Road Championships
1998
Tour du Maroc

1st Stages 7 & 9

1999
3rd Road race, National Road Championships
2002
1st Buggenhout Kermesse
1st Boekhout Kermesse
Tour de Brandenburge

1st Points classification
1st Stage 1

1st Stage 2 Circuit des Mines
5th Archer Grand Prix
2004
1st Overall Credit Union Ras Mumhan

1st Stages 2, 4 & 5

1st Havant International
1st Colne Grand Prix
1st Warwick Town Centre Circuit Race
1st East Yorkshire Classic
1st Stage 4 Circuit des Mines
1st Stage 1 Circuit des Plages Vendéennes
8th Archer Grand Prix
2005
1st Road race, National Road Championships
1st Havant International
1st Lincoln Grand Prix
1st Clitheroe Town Centre Grand Prix
1st Stage 5 Giro del Capo
2nd Overall Circuit des Plages Vendéennes

1st Stage 1

3rd Overall Ruban Granitier Breton

1st Stages 1, 3 & 6

2006
1st Overall Triptyque Ardennais
1st Druivenkoers Overijse
1st Stage 5 Tour de Beauce
7th Omloop der Kempen
9th Overall Tour of Britain
2007
1st Richmond Grand Prix
2nd Merco Credit Union Cycling Classic
3rd Lincoln Grand Prix
2008
1st Overall Premier Calendar
1st Overall Girvan 3-Day

1st Stages 1 & 2

1st Overall Tour of the Reservoir
1st Overall Chas Messenger Stage Race
1st Robert Price International Grand Prix of Wales
1st Tour of Blackpool
1st East Yorkshire Classic
1st Richmond Grand Prix
1st Lincoln Grand Prix
2nd Overall Tour of Ireland

1st Points classification
1st Stage 4

4th Rogaland GP
5th East Midlands International CiCLE Classic
8th Overall Cinturón a Mallorca

1st Stages 2, 3 & 4

10th Overall Tour of Britain
2009
1st Overall Premier Calendar
1st Overall Tour of Ireland

1st Points classification
1st Stage 1

1st Lincoln Grand Prix
1st Smithfield Nocturne
1st Ryedale Grand Prix
1st Colne Grand Prix
1st East Yorkshire Classic Circuit Race
2nd Beaumont Trophy
5th Overall Tour of Britain
5th Overall Girvan Three Day

1st Stages 3 & 4

7th Overall Rás Tailteann
8th East Midlands International CiCLE Classic
9th Overall Cinturón a Mallorca

1st Stage 3

2010
1st Overall Tour de Wallonie

1st Stage 5

1st Monsal Hill Climb
1st Stage 2 Critérium International
1st Stage 1 (TTT) Tour of Qatar
4th Overall Tour de Picardie
2012
1st Grand Prix de la Ville de Lillers
1st Beaumont Trophy
1st Eddie Soens Memorial Road Race
1st Lincoln Grand Prix
1st Stage 5 Tour of Norway
2nd Overall Circuit des Ardennes

1st Points classification
1st Stage 1

4th Route Adélie
2013
1st National Criterium Championships
3rd Monsal Hill Climb
2014
1st Stockton Grand Prix
3rd Ryedale Grand Prix
3rd Circuit of the Fens
3rd Newport Nocturne
4th Road race, Commonwealth Games
5th Rutland–Melton International CiCLE Classic
10th RideLondon–Surrey Classic
2015
4th Gran Premio della Costa Etruschi
4th Velothon Wales
8th Trofeo Playa de Palma
2016
3rd Overall Tour du Loir-et-Cher

1st Stage 2

2017
2nd Poreč Trophy
10th Rutland–Melton CiCLE Classic

=== Track ===
1999
National Track Championships

1st Team pursuit
2nd Madison (with Jon Clay)

2002
National Track Championships

1st Scratch
3rd Points race

2003
National Track Championships

1st Points race
1st Madison (with Dean Downing)
2nd Scratch

2004
1st Team pursuit, UCI Track World Cup, Sydney
3rd Scratch, National Track Championships
2013
3rd Madison, National Track Championships (with Jonathan McEvoy)
2014
2nd Team pursuit, National Track Championships
