= Ben Greenwood =

Personal information
- Full name: Ben Greenwood
- Nickname: Benji
- Born: 30 July 1984 (age 42) Nether Kellet, England, United Kingdom

Cycling career
- Sport: Cycling
- Current team: Macclesfield Wheelers
- Discipline: Road
- Role: Rider

Amateur teams
- 2000: Lune RCC
- 2002: Compensation Group RT
- 2012: Vanilla Bikes
- 2014: Leslie Bike Shop/Biker’s Boutique

Professional teams
- 2005–2006: Recycling.co.uk–MG X-Power
- 2007: Bedogni-Natalini-Praga
- 2008–2011: Rapha Condor–Recycling.co.uk
- 2013: Hope Factory Racing
- 2013: Team IG-Sigma Sport

Ben Greenwood (born 30 July 1984 in Nether Kellet, Lancashire) is a British road racing cyclist who is now a coach with the Great Britain Cycling Team. Originally from Lancashire he now lives in Cheshire and has also represented Scotland. A former member of the Great Britain Under-23 Academy, he has also been a member of the Rapha Condor–Sharp team, and won the Under-23 British Road Championship and the hill climb championship in 2005. He also competed in the Under-23 road race at the 2006 UCI Road World Championships in Salzburg, Austria.
