= Dean Downing =

English bicycle racer (born 1975)

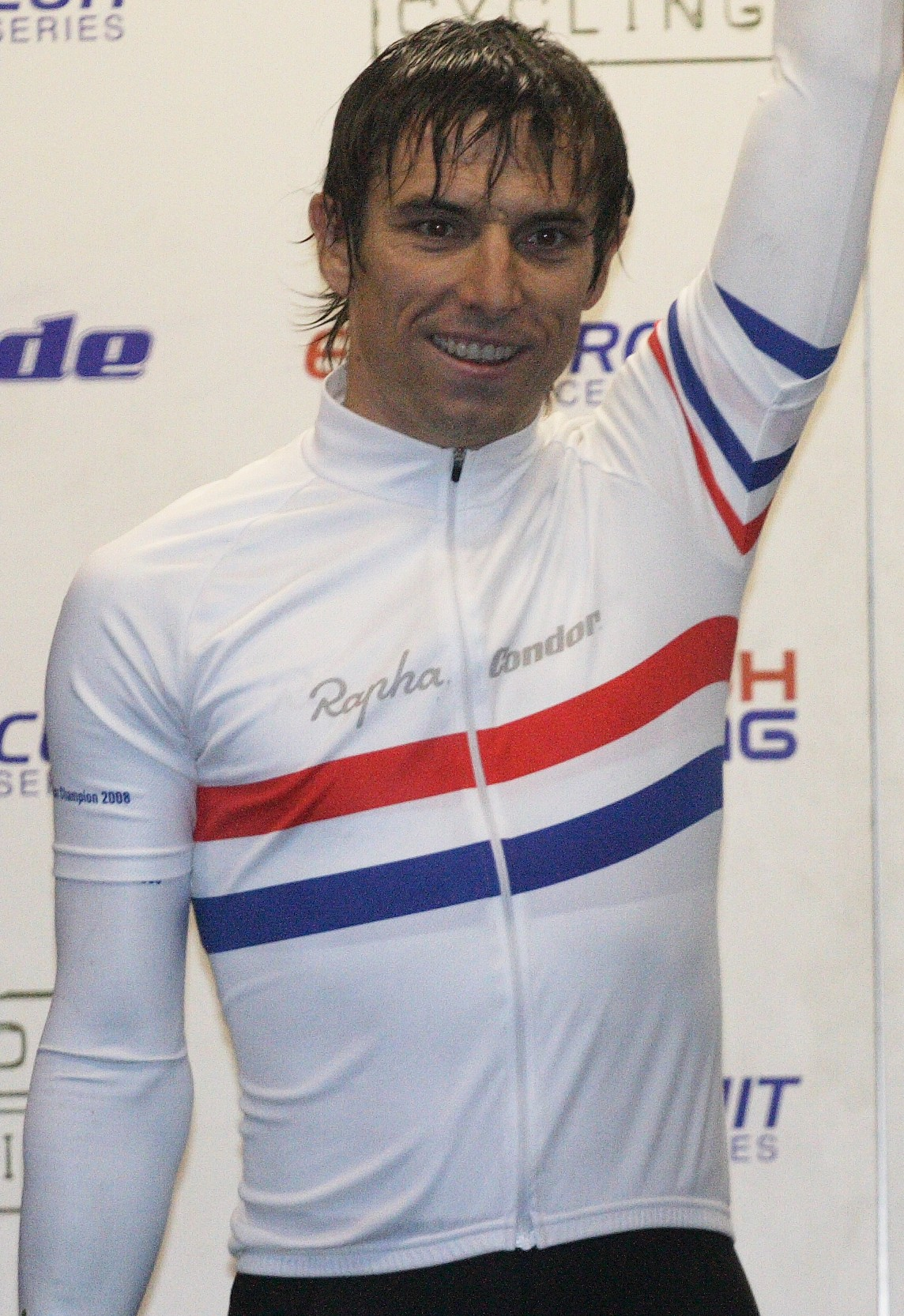

Personal information
- Full name: Dean Downing
- Nickname: Deano
- Born: 24 January 1975 (age 51) Thurcroft, Rotherham, England

Cycling career
- Sport: Cycling
- Current team: Retired
- Disciplines: Track & Road
- Role: Rider
- Rider type: Sprinter

Amateur teams
- 2000: VC St Raphael
- 2001–2003: John Saey
- 2004: Recycling.co.uk–MG X-Power

Professional teams
- 2005: Recycling.co.uk–MG X-Power
- 2006: DFL-Cyclingnews-Litespeed
- 2007–2012: JLT–Condor
- 2013: Madison-Genesis
- 2014: NFTO Pro Cycling

Major wins
- Stage 2, Sachsen-Tour International (2008)

Dean "Deano" Downing (born 24 January 1975) is an English retired bicycle racer, specialising in road cycling who last rode for NFTO Pro Cycling. Downing studied at Wales High School and Sheffield Hallam University, where he graduated in 1998 with a degree in Construction Management. He rode for the DFL-Cyclingnews-Litespeed team in 2006 and is the older brother of former British champion Russell Downing. In 2004, he represented Great Britain at the World Track Championships.

For the 2007 season, Downing rode for the original Rapha Condor team and focussed on the British Premier Calendar. In 2008 the team became Rapha-Condor-Recycling.co.uk. After six years with the Rapha Condor squad Downing moved to the new Madison-Genesis team for 2013. In September 2013 it was announced that Russell and Dean Downing would join the new NFTO cycling team for 2014. Downing retired from racing after competing at the 2014 Sheffield Grand Prix, near his hometown of Rotherham. After retiring he became directeur sportif for the Polypipe Cycling Team in 2015. After the team disbanded at the end of the year Downing took up a DS role with his former team JLT-Condor for 2016. In January 2018 Downing was announced as DS and performance coach for the newly revived Holdsworth team.

== Major results ==
2001
1st, Aalst kermesse, Belgium
1st, Third night Amateur 6 day Gent (track)
2nd, De Drie Zustersteden
2nd, Overall Amateur 6 day Gent (track)
2nd, British Criterium Championship
2nd, Boussu Criterium
2nd, Sinaai kermesse
2002
1st, British Criterium Championship
1st, Melsele kermesse
winner, mountains jersey, Ronde van Zuidoost Vlaanderen
2nd, Landskouter kermesse
2nd, Wondelgem kermesse
2nd, Sinaai Criterium
3rd, Kuurne Criterium
2003
1st, Schellebelle Criterium
1st, Landskouter kermesse
1st, Sinaai kermesse
1st, British Elite Madison Championship, Track
1st, Isle of Wight Stage 1
Winner Mountains Prize, Havant Grand Prix
Winner Mountains Jersey, Ronde van Zuidoost Vlaanderen.
2nd, British Elite Criterium Championship
3rd, Wolvertem kermesse
4th, G.P. Chamont–Gistoux
2004
1st, Metaltek Grand Prix road race
1st, British Elite Criterium Series, Bungay
1st, Don Despatch Road Race
1st, Presten Arena Criterium
1st, Mike Binks memorial road race
1st, Seacroft wheelers road race
1st, York Cycle Works road race
1st, Neil Gardner Memorial Trophy Road Race
1st, British Elite Road Series
2nd, Scratch Race, UCI Track World Cup Sydney
2nd, British Elite Road Series
2nd, Havant International Grand Prix
2nd, Bob Chicken Criterium, London.
2nd, Stan Robson Trophy
2nd, Warwick Town Centre Circuit Race
3rd, Tour of Munster

1st, Stage 1

4th Colne Grand Prix
4th East Yorkshire Classic
2005 – Recycling.co.uk–MG X-Power
Overall winner, British Cycling Criterium Series
1st, British Elite Criterium Series, Stoneleigh-UK
1st, British Elite Criterium Series, Milton Keynes-UK
1st, Tour of the Reservoir road race
1st, Metaltek Grand Prix road race
1st, Stage 3, Bermuda GP
2nd place National Road Championship – Runner-up
2nd, Points Race, British National Track Championships
2nd, British Elite Criterium Series, Glasgow-UK
2nd, Eddie Soens H/cap road race
2nd, Lincoln International
3rd, British Elite Criterium Series, Warwick-UK
3rd overall, Bermuda GP
4th, Crawley Criterium
5th, Clitheroe Town Centre Grand Prix
2006 – DFL-Cyclingnews-Litespeed
1st Trofee Van Haspengouw
1st Neerlineder Kermesse
2007 – Recycling.co.uk
2nd Crawley Town Centre Criterium
4th Overall Premier Calendar

1st, Tour of the Reservoir
1st, Lincoln Grand Prix
1st, Stage 4, Girvan Stage Race
4th, Overall Classification, Bikeline 2 Day

1st, Stage 2
1st, Stage 3

2008 – Rapha Condor–Recycling.co.uk
1st British National Circuit Race Championships
2nd Eddy Soens Memorial
2nd Clayton Velo Spring Classic
2nd Overall Premier Calendar

1st Overall Bikeline 2 Day
2nd Lincoln Grand Prix
2nd Richmond Grand Prix
3rd East Yorkshire Classic
4th Overall Tour of the Reservoir
5th Overall Girvan Stage Race

3rd British National Road Race Championships
3rd British Cycling Elite Circuit Race Series

1st Brentwood Town Centre Race
3rd Circuit de Stone
4th Blackpool Grand Prix Circuit Race

7th Overall, FBD Insurance Rás

1st, Stage 2

2008 – Great Britain National Team
1st, Stage 2, Sachsen-Tour International
2009
1st British Cycling Elite Circuit Series

1st Blackburn Grand Prix
1st Brighouse Circuit Race
3rd Colne Grand Prix
3rd Warwick Town Centre Race
4th Preston Grand Prix
4th East Yorkshire Classic Circuit Race

1st Round 2 - Exeter, Tour Series
1st Round 3 - Woking, Tour Series
2nd Overall Tour of the North

1st Stage 2
1st Stage 4

2nd Blackpool Nocturne
2nd Newcastle Leazes Criterium
4th Shay Elliott Memorial Race
4th Lincoln Grand Prix
5th Overall Tour of the Reservoir
5th Smithfield Nocturne
5th Rochdale Grand Prix Circuit Race
2010 – Rapha Condor-Sharp
6th Overall Tour de Taiwan

3rd, Stage 3
1st, Stage 5
2nd, Stage 6

1st Round 4 - Exeter, Tour Series
1st Round 7 - Peterborough, Tour Series
1st, Dumfries Bike Fest Grand Prix
1st Blackpool Nocturne
2nd British Cycling Elite Circuit Race Series

1st Colne Grand Prix
2nd Dumfries Bike Fest Circuit Race
3rd Blackburn Grand Prix
3rd York Cycling City Centre Race

2011
1st. Stage 1, An Post Rás
1st British Cycling Elite Circuit Race Series

1st Abergavenny Grand Prix
2nd Otley Criterium
2nd Stafford GP
2nd Colne Grand Prix

1st Round 4 - Colchester, Tour Series
1st Clayton Velo Classic
3rd Tour of the Reservoir
5th Smithfield Nocturne
2012
3rd British Cycling Elite Circuit Race Series

2nd Brighouse Circuit Race
3rd Colne Grand Prix

2013
1st, Beaumont Trophy
3rd, London Nocturne
5th British Cycling Elite Circuit Race Series

1st Sheffield Grand Prix
2nd Colne Grand Prix
5th Wales Open Criterium

2014
2nd, Cycle Wiltshire Grand Prix
2nd Colne Grand Prix
3rd Stockton Festival of Cycling Criterium
4th Legstretchers Memorial to Betty Pharoah Road Race
5th British National Circuit Race Championships
5th Beverley Grand Prix
