= JLT–Condor =

Cycling team

Team information
- Registered: United Kingdom
- Founded: 2004
- Disbanded: 2018
- Discipline: Road
- Status: UCI Continental
- Bicycles: Condor
- Website: Team home page

Key personnel
- General manager: John Herety
- Team managers: Kristian House; Dean Downing

Team name history
- 2004 2005 2006–2007 2008 2009 2010–2012 2013–2014 2015–2018: Recycling.co.uk–MG-XPower; Recycling.co.uk–MG-XPower–Litespeed; Recycling.co.uk; Rapha Condor–Recycling.co.uk; Rapha Condor; Rapha Condor–Sharp; Rapha Condor–JLT; JLT–Condor
JLT–Condor jersey
Jersey

JLT–Condor (UCI team code: JLT) was a British UCI continental cycling team. They were previously Rapha Condor–recycling.co.uk following a merger between the recycling.co.uk Pro Cycling Team and the original RaphaCondor team at the end of 2007.

== Profile ==
Rapha Condor was owned by Rapha, a cycling clothing company, and Condor Cycles, a London-based bicycle manufacturer and store. The team is mainly British, including 2009 British champion Kristian House and double Olympic champion Ed Clancy.

The team rides senior professional events in the United Kingdom and second-tier races such as the UCI Europe Tour (i.e. those other than the Grand Tours and UCI ProTour) and the UCI track programme.

After the team and Sharp parted ways, the team announced that JLT Group had signed up as a co-sponsor for the 2013 season. The Jardine Lloyd Thompson group of Insurance Brokers is one of the largest of its type in the world

Rapha announced the company would be stepping away from sponsoring the team after 2014, citing a focus on Team Sky rather than grassroots sport. Subsequently, it was announced that the team would be known as JLT–Condor, presented by Mavic for the 2015 season. The team is now run by Condor, and Rapha passed their ownership to Condor.

In September 2018, the team announced that it would disband at the end of the season after failing to find a primary sponsor to replace JLT, whose deal with the team would expire at the end of the year.

== Final roster ==
As at 31 December 2018.

Rider	Date of birth
Ian Bibby (GBR)	20 December 1986 (aged 32)
Edmund Bradbury (GBR)	10 September 1992 (aged 26)
Graham Briggs (GBR)	14 July 1983 (aged 35)
Germain Burton (GBR)	29 January 1995 (aged 23)
Ed Clancy (GBR)	12 March 1985 (aged 33)
Matthew Gibson (GBR)	2 September 1996 (aged 22)
James Gullen (GBR)	15 October 1989 (aged 29)

Rider	Date of birth
Edward Laverack (GBR)	27 July 1994 (aged 24)
Robert-Jon McCarthy (IRE)	30 March 1994 (aged 24)
Tom Moses (GBR)	3 May 1992 (aged 26)
Jon Mould (GBR)	4 April 1991 (aged 27)
Alistair Slater (GBR)	11 February 1993 (aged 25)
Tom Stewart (GBR)	9 January 1990 (aged 28)
Oliver Wood (GBR)	26 November 1995 (aged 23)

== Major wins ==
Major results 2005–2011

2005
Perf's Pedal Race, Chris Newton
Saint-Jean de Monts, Russell Downing
Saint-Révérend, Russell Downing
Lancashire Criteium, Leigh Cowell
Eddie Soens Memorial, Rob Hayles
Stage 6 Giro del Capo, Russell Downing
Durham Criterium, Dean Downing
Hugh Dornan Memorial, Ben Greenwood
Overall Girvan, Robin Sharman

Stage 1, Robin Sharman
Stage 3 Girvan, Russell Downing

Science in Sport Criterium League, Evan Oliphant
Stages 1, 3 & 6 Ruban Granitier Breton, Russell Downing
Stage 1 Chas Messenger Stage Race, Evan Oliphant
Lach Dennis Criterium, Leigh Cowell
Lincoln International GP, Russell Downing
Crawley Criterium, Russell Downing
John Raisbeck Trophy, Chris Newton
Ingliston Criterium, Evan Oliphant
Overall FBD Insurance Rás, Chris Newton

Stages 2, 3 & 6, Chris Newton

Rocket Roda Race, Chris Newton
Five Valleys Premier Calendar Road Race, Robin Sharman
Port Talbot-Five Valleys, Robin Sharman
East Yorkshire Classic Roadrace, Evan Oliphant
Colne Criterium, Chris Newton
Milton Keynes Criterium, Dean Downing
Welland Valley Criterium, Russell Downing
Smithfields Criterium, Shaun Snodden
Clitheroe Criterium, Russell Downing
Kempsey Criterium, Rob Hayles
Havant International GP, Russell Downing
Stage 3a Surrey League 5 Days, Chris Newton
Stage 4 Surrey League 5 Days, Paul Manning
Stage 5 Surrey League 5 Days, Ben Greenwood
Newport Nocturne Criterium, Chris Newton
Tour of the Peak, Paul Manning
Stage 3 Bermuda GP, Dean Downing
Warrnambool, Evan Oliphant
2006
Stage 4 Tour of Wellington, Evan Oliphant
Stage 2 Mersey Roads Two Day, Robin Sharman
Tour of the Reservoir, Ben Greenwood
Overall Girvan, Kristian House

Stage 1, Robert Partridge
Stage 2, Kristian House

Stage 3 Tour de Bretagne, Kristian House
Lincoln International GP, Kristian House
Rutland–Melton International CiCLE Classic, Robin Sharman
Overall FBD Insurance Rás, Kristian House

Stage 1, Chris Newton
Stage 6, Team Time Trial

Beaumont Trophy, Evan Oliphant
Prologue Boucles de la Mayenne, Chris Newton
Duncombe Park, Evan Oliphant
Colne Criterium, Evan Oliphant
Overall Tour of the South, Chris Newton

Stage 1, Chris Newton

Clitheroe Criteium, Ben Greenwood
Pverall Premier Calendar Road Series, Kristian House
Tour of Pendle, Kristian House
Overall Tour of Tasmania, Kristian House

Stage 1, Kristian House

Stage 9 Tour of Southland, Kristian House
2007
Overall Mersey Roads Two Day, Chris Newton

Stage 1a, Chris Newton

Stage 1 Girvan, Chris Newton
East Yorkshire Classic Roadrace, Chris Newton
Overall Premier Calendar Road Series, Chris Newton
2008
Jock Wadley Memorial RR, Graham Briggs
Overall Mersey Roads Two Day, Dean Downing
Stage 3 Girvan, Robert Partridge
Stage 4 Girvan, Kristian House
Hillingdon Criterium, Graham Briggs
Stage 2 FBD Insurance Rás, Dean Downing
Stage 3 FBD Insurance Rás, Chris Newton
Brentwood Criterium, Dean Downing
Otley circuit, Graham Briggs
Rochdale GP, Chris Newton
Stage 2 Sachsen Tour, Dean Downing
Elite Circuit Series, Graham Briggs
2009
Stages 2 & 4 Irish Sea Tour of the North, Dean Downing
Stage 5 Irish Sea Tour of the North, Matt Cronshaw
Shay Elliott Memorial, Matt Cronshaw
Stage 2 Abergavenny, Darren Lapthorne
Overall FBD Insurance Rás, Simon Richardson
Stage 2 Tour de Beauce, Darren Lapthorne
Stage 4b Tour de Beauce, Matt Cronshaw
Rochdale GP, Chris Newton
Blackpool Criterum, Matt Cronshaw
Brighouse Criterium, Dean Downing
Blackburn Criterium, Dean Downing
Elite Circuit Series, Dean Downing
2008–09 UCI Africa Tour, Dan Craven
2010
Stage 2 La Primavera at Lago Vista, Kristian House
Jock Wadley Memorial RR, Jonathan Tiernan-Locke
Stage 5 Tour de Taiwan, Dean Downing
Overall The Tour Doon Hame, Chris Newton

Stages 1 & 2, Chris Newton

Stage 3 Irish Sea Tour of the North, Matt Cronshaw
Stage 4 Irish Sea Tour of the North, Dean Windsor
Chas Messenger Stage Race, Dan Craven
Lincoln International GP, Chris Newton
Shay Elliott Memorial, Dan Craven
Stage 6 Tour of Japan, Kristian House
Stage 1 FBD Insurance Rás, Dan Craven
Stage 5 FBD Insurance Rás, Jonathan Tiernan-Locke
Dumfries: Dean Downing
Beaumont Trophy, Chris Newton
Colne Criterium, Dean Downing
Overall Premier Calendar Road Series, Chris Newton
Richmond GP, Kristian House
Preston Criterium, Kristian House
Stage 3 Tobago International, Dan Craven
Stages 4 & 5 Tobago International, Kristian House
Stage 4 Tour de Rwanda, Dan Craven
2011
Nedbank Cycle Classic, Dan Craven
Overall Tour of South Africa, Kristian House

Stage 1, Kristian House

Rutland–Melton International CiCLE Classic, Zak Dempster
Stage 5 Tour de Korea, Ed Clancy
Stage 1 An Post Rás, Dean Downing
Ryedale GP, Jonathan Tiernan-Locke
Stage 1 Ronde de l'Oise, Zak Dempster
Overall Teams classification Tour Series

Round 1 (Durham), Zak Dempster

Sprint classification, Kristian House
Teams classification

Round 2 (Aberystwyth), Ed Clancy

Sprint classification, Kristian House
Teams classification

Round 3 (Peterborough), Graham Briggs

Teams classification

Round 4 (Colchester), Dean Downing

Teams classification

Round 5 (Stoke-on-Trent) Teams classification

Stafford Town Center Races, Dean Windsor
Wales Open Criterium, Dean Downing
Colne GP, Ed Clancy
Stage 3 Vuelta Ciclista a León, Dan Craven
Stage 4 Vuelta Ciclista a León, Jonathan Tiernan-Locke
Stage 5 Vuelta Ciclista a León, Kristian House
Overall Elite Circuit Series, Dean Downing
Richmond GP, Andrew Tennant

2012
Stage 5 Vuelta Ciclista a León, Richard Handley
2013
Overall Tour de Korea, Michael Cuming
2014
Stage 1 Tour de Normandie, Tom Moses
Prologue Mzansi Tour, Team time trial
Overall Tour du Loir-et-Cher, Graham Briggs

Stage 3, Graham Briggs

Rutland–Melton CiCLE Classic, Tom Moses
Overall Tour de Korea, Hugh Carthy

Stage 2, Richard Handley
Stage 5, Michael Cuming
Stage 7, Hugh Carthy

Beaumont Trophy, Kristian House
2015
Danum Trophy Road Race, Graham Briggs
Angela Davies Memorial Road Race, Richard Handley
London Nocturne, Ed Clancy
2016
Stage 1 New Zealand Cycle Classic, Chris Lawless
Stage 2 Tour du Loir-et-Cher, Russell Downing
Rutland–Melton CiCLE Classic, Conor Dunne
London Nocturne, Chris Lawless
Olympic Games (Team pursuit), Ed Clancy
2017
Overall Bay Classic Series, Ian Bibby

Stage 1, Ian Bibby

Stages 3 & 5 New Zealand Cycle Classic, Alex Frame
Stage 4 New Zealand Cycle Classic, Jon Mould
Prologue & Stage 3 Istrian Spring Trophy, Alex Frame
Stage 2 Tour de Taiwan, James Gullen
Stage 5 Tour de Taiwan, Brenton Jones
Chorley Grand Prix, Ian Bibby
Overall Rás Tailteann, James Gullen
Stage 5 Tour de Korea, Brenton Jones
London Nocturne, Brenton Jones
2018
Stage 3 New Zealand Cycle Classic, Matthew Gibson
Stage 4 New Zealand Cycle Classic, Ian Bibby
Prologue Herald Sun Tour, Ed Clancy
Overall Tour de Normandie, Matthew Gibson

Stage 6, Matthew Gibson

Stage 5 Tour du Loir-et-Cher, Tom Stewart
Prologue Tour of Japan, Ian Bibby
Stage 2 Rás Tailteann, Robert-Jon McCarthy
London Nocturne, Ed Clancy
Stage 4 Kreiz Breizh Elites, Alistair Slater
Grand Prix des Marbriers, Jon Mould

== National, continental and world champions ==
2005
British National Road Race Championships, Russell Downing
British National U23 Road Race Championship, Ben Greenwood
British National U23 Time Trial Championships, Ben Greenwood
British National Track Championships (Individual Pursuit), Paul Manning
British} National Track Championships (Points race), Paul Manning
2006
British National Track Championships (Scratch Race), Chris Newton
2007
British National Track Championships (Points Race), Chris Newton
2008
British National Track Championships (Scratch Race), Chris Newton
British National Track Championships (Points Race), Chris Newton
2009
British National Road Race Championship, Kristian House
British National Track Championships (Scratch Race), Chris Newton
British National Track Championships (Points Race), Chris Newton
2012
Irish National Criterium Championships, Felix English
World Track Championships (Team Pursuit), Ed Clancy
British National U23 Road Race Championship, Michael Cuming
2013
European Track Championships (Team Pursuit), Ed Clancy
British National Track Championship (Pursuit), Ed Clancy
British National Track Championship (Points Race), Ed Clancy
2014
British National U23 Road Race Championship, Edward Laverack
European Track Championships (Team Pursuit), Ed Clancy
