= Mzansi Tour =

Race details
- Date: April
- Region: South Africa
- Discipline: Road
- Competition: UCI Africa Tour
- Type: stage race
- Web site: www.mzansitour.co.za

History
- First edition: 2013
- Editions: 2 (2014)
- First winner: Robert Hunter (RSA)
- Most recent: Jacques Janse van Rensburg (RSA)

The Mzansi Tour is a staged cycling race held annually in South Africa. It is part of UCI Africa Tour and is rated a 2.2 event. The 2015 event did not take place.

== Winners ==
Year	Country	Rider	Team
2013	South Africa	Robert Hunter	South Africa national team
2014	South Africa	Jacques Janse van Rensburg	MTN Qhubeka
