= Beaumont Trophy =

British one-day road cycling race

Race details
- Date: September/October
- Region: Northumberland, England
- Local name: Cyclone Festival of Cycling
- Discipline: Road
- Competition: British National Road Race Series
- Type: Single day race

History
- First edition: 1952
- Editions: 73 (as of 2025)
- First winner: Stan Blair (GBR)
- Most wins: Ray Wetherell (GBR) (5 wins)
- Most recent: Dylan Hicks (GBR)

The Beaumont Trophy is a cycle road race first run in 1952. The Trophy was presented to the Gosforth Road Club by Rex Beaumont who was a local cycle wholesaler on Tyneside. The Gosforth Road Club had been created in July 1951 as an offshoot of the Ridley Cycling Club as a result of young riders being unable to gain entry into local races. The race was run under BLRC Regulations from 1952 until 1959 when it came under the regulations of the newly formed British Cycling Federation. It was run continuously from 1952 to 2019, as the 2020 edition was cancelled due to the COVID-19 pandemic in the UK. This 67 year streak made it the longest-running road race in the UK. In the early 1950s the race started and finished in Gosforth Park where the clubhouse was situated. In the early '60s, the start/finish moved to Ponteland because of an increase in traffic. Race distances were normally 85–90 miles and the route was out and back finishing at Cottage Homes, Ponteland.

In the early 1980s the start/finish moved to the west of Newcastle but this did not last long. In the mid-'80s the race moved to Stamfordham where it has remained ever since. When it became a Premier Calendar event followed by it becoming a UCI 1.2 and then part of the National Road race series the distance increased to over 100 miles and started to use a circuit that normally incorporated the Ryals. The race became part of the Cyclone Festival of Cycling in 2007 as a British Cycling Premier Calendar Race. In 2011 it was the Men's British National Championships won by Bradley Wiggins; the Festival also ran the Women's National Road Race Championships won by Lizzie Armistead. The Beaumont Trophy was again the Men's National Road Race Championships in 2018 and was won by Connor Swift. Over the period of time the race has been held, it has used a number of different routes. It has used a variation of routes around Stamfordham for the past 20 years.

The race is part of the current British National Road Race Series and was a UCI 1.2 Race for 3 years.

== Past winners ==
Year	Country	Rider	Team
1952	Great Britain	Stan Blair	Viking Cycles
1953	Great Britain	Don Sanderson	Northern Couriers
1954	Great Britain	Des Robinson	Huddersfield RC
1955	Great Britain	Don Sanderson	Northern Couriers
1958	Great Britain	Bill Baty	Tyne Velo
1962	Great Britain	Derek Hepple	Tyne Valley RC
1963	Great Britain	Ron Gardener	Tranent Thistle CC
1964	Great Britain	John Dixon	Barnesbury CC
1965	Great Britain	Norman Baty	Tyne Velo
1966	Great Britain	Ray Wetherell	Newcastle Cheviot
1967	Great Britain	Ray Wetherell	Newcastle Cheviot
1968	Great Britain	Ray Wetherell	Newcastle Cheviot
1969	Great Britain	Paul Blackett	VC Electric
1970	Great Britain	Eddie McGourley	Houghton CC
1971	Great Britain	Ray Wetherell	Newcastle Cheviot
1972	Great Britain	Ray Wetherell	Newcastle Cheviot
1973	Great Britain	Joseph Waugh	Tyne RC
1975	Great Britain	Robin Childes	Cleveland Couriers
1976	Great Britain	Alan Topp	Cleveland Couriers
1982	Great Britain	Richard Healy	Ryton Cheviot CC
1983	Great Britain	Arthur Caygill	Richmond & Darlington CC
1990	Great Britain	Robert Harris	Leeds RRC
1991	Great Britain	Andy Matheson	Musselburgh RRC
1993	Great Britain	Richard Moore	Hull Couriers
1994	Great Britain	Paul Curran	Optimum Performance
1995	Great Britain	Mark Walsham	Optimum Performance
1997	Great Britain	Paul Blackett Jr.	North East RT
1998	Great Britain	Elliot Gowland	Sunderland Clarion
1999	Great Britain	Ian Childes	Middridge CRT
2000	Great Britain	Billy Mitchinson	STG Racing
2001	Great Britain	Glen Turnbull	VC Briganti
2002	Great Britain	Richard Sutcliffe	York Cycleworks
2003	Great Britain	Graham McGarrity	Scotoil RT
2004	Great Britain	Mark Wordsworth	Doncaster Wheelers
2005	Great Britain	Malcolm Elliott	Pinarello–Assos
2006	Great Britain	Evan Oliphant	Recycling.co.uk
2007	Great Britain	Russell Downing	Health Net–Maxxis
2008	Great Britain	Rob Hayles	Team Halfords Bikehut
2009	Great Britain	Bradley Wiggins	Garmin–Slipstream
2010	Great Britain	Chris Newton	Rapha Condor–Sharp
2011	Great Britain	Bradley Wiggins	Team Sky
2012	Great Britain	Russell Downing	Endura Racing
2013	Great Britain	Dean Downing	Madison Genesis
2014	Great Britain	Kristian House	Rapha Condor–JLT
2015	Great Britain	Christopher Latham	Great Britain (national team)
2016	New Zealand	Dion Smith	ONE Pro Cycling
2017	Great Britain	Peter Williams	ONE Pro Cycling
2018	Great Britain	Connor Swift	Madison Genesis
2020	No race due to the COVID-19 pandemic in the United Kingdom		
2021	Great Britain	Jacob Scott	Canyon dhb SunGod
2022	Great Britain	Jack Rootkin-Gray	Saint Piran
2023	Great Britain	Finn Crockett	Saint Piran
2024	Great Britain	Oliver Rees	Sabgal–Anicolor
2025	Great Britain	Dylan Hicks	Raptor Factory Racing
