= Rutland–Melton CiCLE Classic =

British one-day road cycling race

Rutland–Melton International CiCLE Classic
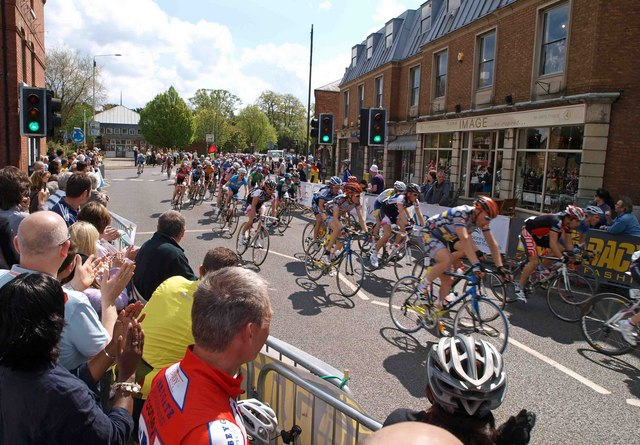
- The 2009 East Midlands International CiCLE Classic in Oakham

Race details
- Date: Late April
- Region: East Midlands, England
- English name: Rutland–Melton International CiCLE Classic
- Local name: CiCLE Classic
- Discipline: Road
- Competition: UCI Europe Tour
- Type: One-day race
- Web site: cicleclassic.co.uk

History
- First edition: 2005
- Editions: 19 (as of 2026)
- First winner: Scott Gamble (GBR)
- Most wins: Ian Wilkinson (GBR) (2 wins)
- Most recent: Otto van Zanden (NED)

The Rutland–Melton International CiCLE Classic is a road bicycle race that starts in Oakham and finishes in Melton Mowbray. The 2008 version was 158 km long.

The race is characterised by its off-road sections and short, sharp climbs on narrow and treacherous farm tracks – taking its inspiration from the Paris–Roubaix and Tour of Flanders. Originally part of the British Premier Calendar, from 2008 it is a 1.2 event on the UCI Europe Tour.

The race was known as the East Midlands International CiCLE Classic in the years 2007–10 when its principal sponsor was the East Midlands Development Agency.

== Winners ==
Year	Country	Rider	Team
2005	Great Britain	Scott Gamble	East Midlands BC Div.
2006	Great Britain	Robin Sharman	Recycling.co.uk
2007	Great Britain	Malcolm Elliott	Pinarello Racing Team
2008	Ireland	Ciaran Power	Pezula Racing
2009	Great Britain	Ian Wilkinson	Team Halfords Bikehut
2010	Denmark	Michael Berling	Glud & Marstrand–LRØ Radgivning
2011	Australia	Zakkari Dempster	Rapha Condor–Sharp
2012	France	Alexandre Blain	Endura Racing
2013	Great Britain	Ian Wilkinson	Team UK Youth
2014	Great Britain	Tom Moses	Rapha Condor–JLT
2015	Australia	Steele Von Hoff	NFTO
2016	Ireland	Conor Dunne	JLT–Condor
2017	Great Britain	Daniel Fleeman	Metaltek–Kuota
2018	Great Britain	Gabriel Cullaigh	WIGGINS
2019	United States	Colin Joyce	Rally UHC Cycling
2020	No race due to COVID-19 pandemic		
2021	No race due to COVID-19 pandemic		
2022	Great Britain	Finn Crockett	Ribble Weldtite
2023	United States	Luke Lamperti	Trinity Racing
2024	No race due to 2024 United Kingdom floods		
2025	Great Britain	Ben Granger	MG.K Vis Costruzioni e Ambiente
2026	Netherlands	Otto van Zanden	Azerion / Villa Valkenburg
