= 2017 Tour of Britain =

2017 UCI Europe Tour
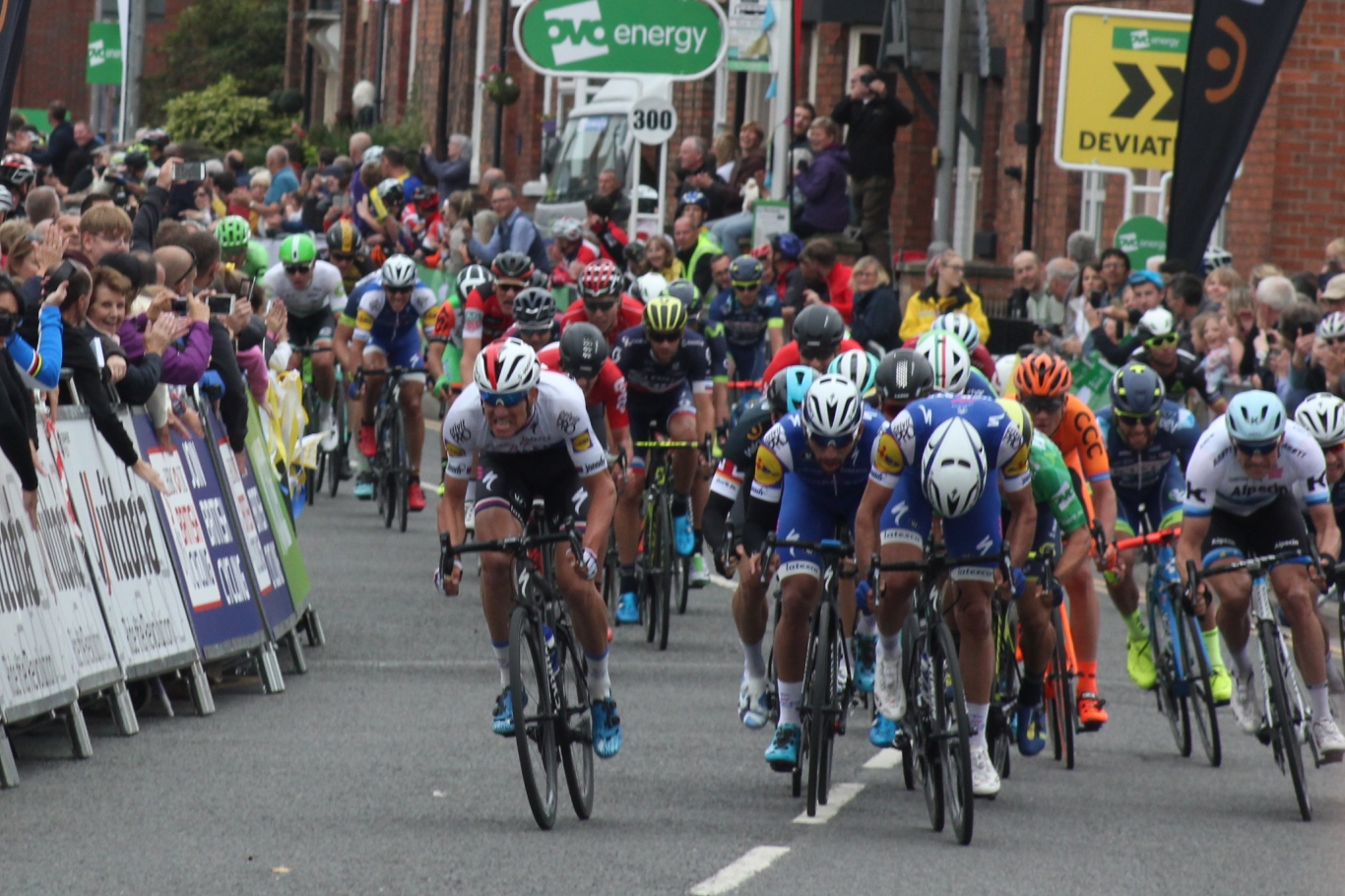
- The bunch sprint for Stage 4 in Newark-on-Trent

Race details
- Dates: 3–10 September
- Stages: 8
- Distance: 1,313.4 km (816.1 mi)

Results
Jersey awarded to the overall winner	Winner	Lars Boom (NED)	(LottoNL–Jumbo)
	Second	Edvald Boasson Hagen (NOR)	(Team Dimension Data)
	Third	Stefan Küng (SUI)	(BMC Racing Team)
Jersey awarded to the points classification winner	Points	Alexander Kristoff (NOR)	(Team Katusha–Alpecin)
Jersey awarded to the mountains classification winner	Mountains	Łukasz Owsian (POL)	(CCC–Sprandi–Polkowice)
Jersey awarded to the sprints classification winner	Sprints	Mark McNally (GBR)	(Wanty–Groupe Gobert)
	Team	LottoNL–Jumbo	

The 2017 Tour of Britain was an eight-stage men's professional road cycling race. It was the fourteenth running of the modern version of the Tour of Britain and the 77th British tour in total. The race started on 3 September in Edinburgh and finished on 10 September in Cardiff. The race was part of the 2017 UCI Europe Tour.

== Teams ==
The twenty teams invited to participate in the Tour of Britain were:

UCI WorldTeams
- BMC Racing Team
- Cannondale–Drapac
- Lotto–Soudal
- LottoNL–Jumbo
- Movistar Team
- Orica–Scott
- Quick-Step Floors
- Team Dimension Data
- Team Katusha–Alpecin
- Team Sky
UCI Professional Continental Teams
- Bardiani–CSF
- CCC–Sprandi–Polkowice
- Wanty–Groupe Gobert
UCI Continental Teams
- An Post–Chain Reaction
- Bike Channel–Canyon
- Cylance Pro Cycling
- JLT–Condor
- Madison Genesis
- ONE Pro Cycling
National Teams
- Great Britain

== Stages ==
List of stages
Stage	Date	Course	Distance	Type	Winner	Ref
1	3 September	Edinburgh – Kelso	190.1 km (118 mi)	Hilly stage	Caleb Ewan (AUS)	
2	4 September	Kielder Water – Blyth	211.7 km (132 mi)	Hilly stage	Elia Viviani (ITA)	
3	5 September	Normanby Hall – Scunthorpe	178.5 km (111 mi)	Flat stage	Caleb Ewan (AUS)	
4	6 September	Mansfield – Newark-on-Trent	164.7 km (102 mi)	Flat stage	Fernando Gaviria (COL)	
5	7 September	Tendring	16.2 km (10 mi)	Individual time trial	Lars Boom (NED)	
6	8 September	Newmarket – Aldeburgh	186.9 km (116 mi)	Flat stage	Caleb Ewan (AUS)	
7	9 September	Hemel Hempstead – Cheltenham	185.1 km (115 mi)	Hilly stage	Dylan Groenewegen (NED)	
8	10 September	Worcester – Cardiff	180.2 km (112 mi)	Hilly stage	Edvald Boasson Hagen (NOR)	

=== Stage 1 ===
3 September 2017 — Edinburgh to Kelso, 190.1 km (118 mi)

Stage 1 result

Rank	Rider	Team	Time
1	Caleb Ewan (AUS)	Orica–Scott	4h 34' 17"
2	Edvald Boasson Hagen (NOR)	Team Dimension Data	+ 0"
3	Elia Viviani (ITA)	Team Sky	+ 0"
4	Alexander Kristoff (NOR)	Team Katusha–Alpecin	+ 0"
5	Fernando Gaviria (COL)	Quick-Step Floors	+ 0"
6	Chris Lawless (GBR)	Great Britain	+ 0"
7	Brenton Jones (AUS)	JLT–Condor	+ 0"
8	Nikolas Maes (BEL)	Lotto–Soudal	+ 0"
9	Zdeněk Štybar (CZE)	Quick-Step Floors	+ 0"
10	Floris Gerts (NED)	BMC Racing Team	+ 0"

General classification after Stage 1

Rank	Rider	Team	Time
1	Caleb Ewan (AUS)	Orica–Scott	4h 34' 7"
2	Edvald Boasson Hagen (NOR)	Team Dimension Data	+ 3"
3	Elia Viviani (ITA)	Team Sky	+ 4"
4	Alexander Kristoff (NOR)	Team Katusha–Alpecin	+ 6"
5	Fernando Gaviria (COL)	Quick-Step Floors	+ 10"
6	Chris Lawless (GBR)	Great Britain	+ 10"
7	Brenton Jones (AUS)	JLT–Condor	+ 10"
8	Nikolas Maes (BEL)	Lotto–Soudal	+ 10"
9	Zdeněk Štybar (CZE)	Quick-Step Floors	+ 10"
10	Floris Gerts (NED)	BMC Racing Team	+ 10"

=== Stage 2 ===
4 September 2017 — Kielder Water to Blyth, 211.7 km (132 mi)

Stage 2 result

Rank	Rider	Team	Time
1	Elia Viviani (ITA)	Team Sky	5h 16' 32"
2	Dylan Groenewegen (NED)	LottoNL–Jumbo	+ 0"
3	Fernando Gaviria (COL)	Quick-Step Floors	+ 0"
4	Caleb Ewan (AUS)	Orica–Scott	+ 0"
5	Alexander Kristoff (NOR)	Team Katusha–Alpecin	+ 0"
6	Zdeněk Štybar (CZE)	Quick-Step Floors	+ 0"
7	Floris Gerts (NED)	BMC Racing Team	+ 0"
8	Roger Kluge (GER)	Orica–Scott	+ 0"
9	Marcel Sieberg (GER)	Lotto–Soudal	+ 0"
10	Daniele Bennati (ITA)	Movistar Team	+ 0"

General classification after Stage 2

Rank	Rider	Team	Time
1	Elia Viviani (ITA)	Team Sky	9h 50' 35"
2	Caleb Ewan (AUS)	Orica–Scott	+ 4"
3	Edvald Boasson Hagen (NOR)	Team Dimension Data	+ 7"
4	Karol Domagalski (POL)	ONE Pro Cycling	+ 8"
5	Silvan Dillier (SUI)	BMC Racing Team	+ 9"
6	Kamil Gradek (POL)	ONE Pro Cycling	+ 9"
7	Fernando Gaviria (COL)	Quick-Step Floors	+ 10"
8	Lars Boom (NED)	LottoNL–Jumbo	+ 12"
9	Alexander Kristoff (NOR)	Team Katusha–Alpecin	+ 14"
10	Zdeněk Štybar (CZE)	Quick-Step Floors	+ 14"

=== Stage 3 ===
5 September 2017 — Normanby Hall – Scunthorpe, 178.5 km (111 mi)

Stage 3 result

Rank	Rider	Team	Time
1	Caleb Ewan (AUS)	Orica–Scott	4h 04' 05"
2	Edvald Boasson Hagen (NOR)	Team Dimension Data	+ 0"
3	Alexander Kristoff (NOR)	Team Katusha–Alpecin	+ 0"
4	Brenton Jones (AUS)	JLT–Condor	+ 0"
5	Mads Würtz Schmidt (DEN)	Team Katusha–Alpecin	+ 0"
6	Andrea Pasqualon (ITA)	Wanty–Groupe Gobert	+ 0"
7	Elia Viviani (ITA)	Team Sky	+ 0"
8	Philippe Gilbert (BEL)	Quick-Step Floors	+ 0"
9	Daniele Bennati (ITA)	Movistar Team	+ 0"
10	Nikolas Maes (BEL)	Lotto–Soudal	+ 0"

General classification after Stage 3

Rank	Rider	Team	Time
1	Caleb Ewan (AUS)	Orica–Scott	13h 54' 34"
2	Elia Viviani (ITA)	Team Sky	+ 6"
3	Edvald Boasson Hagen (NOR)	Team Dimension Data	+ 7"
4	Karol Domagalski (POL)	ONE Pro Cycling	+ 14"
5	Silvan Dillier (SUI)	BMC Racing Team	+ 15"
6	Kamil Gradek (POL)	ONE Pro Cycling	+ 15"
7	Alexander Kristoff (NOR)	Team Katusha–Alpecin	+ 16"
8	Fernando Gaviria (COL)	Quick-Step Floors	+ 16"
9	Lars Boom (NED)	LottoNL–Jumbo	+ 18"
10	Zdeněk Štybar (CZE)	Quick-Step Floors	+ 20"

=== Stage 4 ===
6 September 2017 — Mansfield – Newark-on-Trent, 164.7 km (102 mi)

Stage 4 result

Rank	Rider	Team	Time
1	Fernando Gaviria (COL)	Quick-Step Floors	3h 43' 31"
2	Elia Viviani (ITA)	Team Sky	+ 0"
3	Alexander Kristoff (NOR)	Team Katusha–Alpecin	+ 0"
4	Dylan Groenewegen (NED)	LottoNL–Jumbo	+ 0"
5	Alan Banaszek (POL)	CCC–Sprandi–Polkowice	+ 0"
6	Andrea Pasqualon (ITA)	Wanty–Groupe Gobert	+ 0"
7	Harry Tanfield (GBR)	Bike Channel–Canyon	+ 0"
8	Enzo Wouters (BEL)	Lotto–Soudal	+ 0"
9	Nikolas Maes (BEL)	Lotto–Soudal	+ 0"
10	Nils Politt (GER)	Team Katusha–Alpecin	+ 0"

General classification after Stage 4

Rank	Rider	Team	Time
1	Elia Viviani (ITA)	Team Sky	17h 38' 05"
2	Caleb Ewan (AUS)	Orica–Scott	+ 0"
3	Fernando Gaviria (COL)	Quick-Step Floors	+ 6"
4	Edvald Boasson Hagen (NOR)	Team Dimension Data	+ 7"
5	Alexander Kristoff (NOR)	Team Katusha–Alpecin	+ 12"
6	Karol Domagalski (POL)	ONE Pro Cycling	+ 14"
7	Silvan Dillier (SUI)	BMC Racing Team	+ 15"
8	Kamil Gradek (POL)	ONE Pro Cycling	+ 15"
9	Lars Boom (NED)	LottoNL–Jumbo	+ 18"
10	Richard Handley (GBR)	Madison Genesis	+ 19"

=== Stage 5 ===
7 September 2017 — Tendring, 16.2 km (10 mi)

Stage 5 result

Rank	Rider	Team	Time
1	Lars Boom (NED)	LottoNL–Jumbo	19' 02"50
2	Victor Campenaerts (BEL)	LottoNL–Jumbo	+ 6"
3	Vasil Kiryienka (BLR)	Team Sky	+ 7"
4	Stefan Küng (SUI)	BMC Racing Team	+ 8"
5	Jos van Emden (NED)	LottoNL–Jumbo	+ 11"
6	Tony Martin (GER)	Team Katusha–Alpecin	+ 12"
7	Michał Kwiatkowski (POL)	Team Sky	+ 17"
8	Geraint Thomas (GBR)	Team Sky	+ 17"
9	Alex Dowsett (GBR)	Movistar Team	+ 21"
10	Luke Durbridge (AUS)	Orica–Scott	+ 21"

General classification after Stage 5

Rank	Rider	Team	Time
1	Lars Boom (NED)	LottoNL–Jumbo	17h 57' 25"
2	Victor Campenaerts (BEL)	LottoNL–Jumbo	+ 8"
3	Vasil Kiryienka (BLR)	Team Sky	+ 9"
4	Stefan Küng (SUI)	BMC Racing Team	+ 10"
5	Jos van Emden (NED)	LottoNL–Jumbo	+ 13"
6	Tony Martin (GER)	Team Katusha–Alpecin	+ 14"
7	Michał Kwiatkowski (POL)	Team Sky	+ 19"
8	Edvald Boasson Hagen (NOR)	Team Dimension Data	+ 19"
9	Geraint Thomas (GBR)	Team Sky	+ 19"
10	Alex Dowsett (GBR)	Movistar Team	+ 23"

=== Stage 6 ===
8 September 2017 — Newmarket to Aldeburgh, 186.9 km (116 mi)

Stage 6 result

Rank	Rider	Team	Time
1	Caleb Ewan (AUS)	Orica–Scott	4h 13' 6"
2	Fernando Gaviria (COL)	Quick-Step Floors	+ 0"
3	Dylan Groenewegen (NED)	LottoNL–Jumbo	+ 0"
4	Alexander Kristoff (NOR)	Team Katusha–Alpecin	+ 0"
5	Andrea Pasqualon (ITA)	Wanty–Groupe Gobert	+ 0"
6	Brenton Jones (AUS)	JLT–Condor	+ 0"
7	Enzo Wouters (BEL)	Lotto–Soudal	+ 0"
8	Edvald Boasson Hagen (NOR)	Team Dimension Data	+ 0"
9	Patrick Bevin (NZL)	Cannondale–Drapac	+ 0"
10	Michał Kwiatkowski (POL)	Team Sky	+ 0"

General classification after Stage 6

Rank	Rider	Team	Time
1	Lars Boom (NED)	LottoNL–Jumbo	22h 10' 31"
2	Victor Campenaerts (BEL)	LottoNL–Jumbo	+ 8"
3	Vasil Kiryienka (BLR)	Team Sky	+ 9"
4	Stefan Küng (SUI)	BMC Racing Team	+ 10"
5	Jos van Emden (NED)	LottoNL–Jumbo	+ 13"
6	Tony Martin (GER)	Team Katusha–Alpecin	+ 14"
7	Michał Kwiatkowski (POL)	Team Sky	+ 19"
8	Edvald Boasson Hagen (NOR)	Team Dimension Data	+ 19"
9	Geraint Thomas (GBR)	Team Sky	+ 19"
10	Ryan Mullen (IRL)	Cannondale–Drapac	+ 27"

=== Stage 7 ===
9 September 2017 — Hemel Hempstead to Cheltenham, 185.1 km (115 mi)

Stage 7 result

Rank	Rider	Team	Time
1	Dylan Groenewegen (NED)	LottoNL–Jumbo	4h 26' 58"
2	Caleb Ewan (AUS)	Orica–Scott	+ 0"
3	Brenton Jones (AUS)	JLT–Condor	+ 0"
4	Alexander Kristoff (NOR)	Team Katusha–Alpecin	+ 0"
5	Andrea Pasqualon (ITA)	Wanty–Groupe Gobert	+ 0"
6	Daniele Bennati (ITA)	Movistar Team	+ 0"
7	Fernando Gaviria (COL)	Quick-Step Floors	+ 0"
8	Nikolas Maes (BEL)	Lotto–Soudal	+ 0"
9	Floris Gerts (NED)	BMC Racing Team	+ 0"
10	Vincenzo Albanese (ITA)	Bardiani–CSF	+ 0"

General classification after Stage 7

Rank	Rider	Team	Time
1	Lars Boom (NED)	LottoNL–Jumbo	26h 37' 28"
2	Stefan Küng (SUI)	BMC Racing Team	+ 8"
3	Victor Campenaerts (BEL)	LottoNL–Jumbo	+ 9"
4	Vasil Kiryienka (BLR)	Team Sky	+ 10"
5	Jos van Emden (NED)	LottoNL–Jumbo	+ 14"
6	Tony Martin (GER)	Team Katusha–Alpecin	+ 15"
7	Michał Kwiatkowski (POL)	Team Sky	+ 20"
8	Edvald Boasson Hagen (NOR)	Team Dimension Data	+ 20"
9	Geraint Thomas (GBR)	Team Sky	+ 20"
10	Ryan Mullen (IRL)	Cannondale–Drapac	+ 28"

=== Stage 8 ===
10 September 2017 — Worcester to Cardiff, 180.2 km (112 mi)

Stage 8 result

Rank	Rider	Team	Time
1	Edvald Boasson Hagen (NOR)	Team Dimension Data	4h 19' 0"
2	Ariel Maximiliano Richeze (ARG)	Quick-Step Floors	+ 0"
3	Alexander Kristoff (NOR)	Team Katusha–Alpecin	+ 0"
4	Luka Mezgec (SLO)	Orica–Scott	+ 0"
5	Brenton Jones (AUS)	JLT–Condor	+ 0"
6	Andrea Pasqualon (ITA)	Wanty–Groupe Gobert	+ 0"
7	Floris Gerts (NED)	BMC Racing Team	+ 0"
8	Fernando Gaviria (COL)	Quick-Step Floors	+ 0"
9	Jonas Koch (GER)	CCC–Sprandi–Polkowice	+ 0"
10	Elia Viviani (ITA)	Team Sky	+ 0"

General classification after Stage 8

Rank	Rider	Team	Time
1	Lars Boom (NED)	LottoNL–Jumbo	30h 56' 34"
2	Edvald Boasson Hagen (NOR)	Team Dimension Data	+ 8"
3	Stefan Küng (SUI)	BMC Racing Team	+ 10"
4	Victor Campenaerts (BEL)	LottoNL–Jumbo	+ 13"
5	Michał Kwiatkowski (POL)	Team Sky	+ 18"
6	Jos van Emden (NED)	LottoNL–Jumbo	+ 18"
7	Geraint Thomas (GBR)	Team Sky	+ 24"
8	Tony Martin (GER)	Team Katusha–Alpecin	+ 25"
9	Owain Doull (GBR)	Team Sky	+ 33"
10	Ryan Mullen (IRL)	Cannondale–Drapac	+ 38"

== Classification leadership ==
Classification leadership by stage
Stage	Winner	General classification	Points classification	Mountains classification	Sprints classification	Team classification	Combativity
1	Caleb Ewan	Caleb Ewan	Caleb Ewan	Łukasz Owsian	Karol Domagalski	Team Katusha–Alpecin	Karol Domagalski
2	Elia Viviani	Elia Viviani	Elia Viviani	Łukasz Owsian	Karol Domagalski	Quick-Step Floors	Matt Holmes
3	Caleb Ewan	Caleb Ewan	Caleb Ewan	Graham Briggs	Graham Briggs	Team Katusha–Alpecin	Harry Tanfield
4	Fernando Gaviria	Elia Viviani	Elia Viviani	Jacob Scott	Graham Briggs	Quick-Step Floors	Alistair Slater
5	Lars Boom	Lars Boom	Elia Viviani	Jacob Scott	Graham Briggs	LottoNL–Jumbo	Lars Boom
6	Caleb Ewan	Lars Boom	Alexander Kristoff	Jacob Scott	Graham Briggs	LottoNL–Jumbo	James Shaw
7	Dylan Groenewegen	Lars Boom	Alexander Kristoff	Jacob Scott	Mark McNally	LottoNL–Jumbo	Russell Downing
8	Edvald Boasson Hagen	Lars Boom	Alexander Kristoff	Łukasz Owsian	Mark McNally	LottoNL–Jumbo	Mark Stewart
Final		Lars Boom	Alexander Kristoff	Łukasz Owsian	Mark McNally	LottoNL–Jumbo	Graham Briggs
