= Tour Series =

British annual cycling series

Race details
- Date: May; June (until 2016); August (2021)
- Region: Great Britain
- Discipline: Road
- Type: Criterium series
- Organiser: Sweetspot
- Race director: Mick Bennett
- Web site: www.tourseries.co.uk

History
- First edition: 2009
- Editions: 13 (as of 2022)
- First winner: Team Halfords Bikehut
- Most wins: JLT–Condor (4 wins) (Note: The team won as Rapha Condor–Sharp in 2011, Rapha Condor–JLT in 2014 and JLT–Condor in 2016 and 2017.)
- Most recent: WiV SunGod

The Tour Series is an annual series of cycling criterium races held in the United Kingdom since 2009. It is televised by ITV4 in the UK. The competition emphasises team effort with individual wins deemed less important.

The races are held over 1 hour of racing plus 5 laps. The team standings for each round are calculated by adding together the positions of the top three riders of each team (5 riders start for each team) and the team with the lowest score wins, and get 10 points for the overall championship. Each team gets 1 point less than the one in front of them, so second gets 9, third gets 8, and so on. In addition, there is the sprint competition. There are three sprints every race, and the top five riders are awarded points based on place: 1st, 5; 2nd, 4; 3rd, 3; 4th, 2 and 5th, 1. There is a competition each round, as well as an overall competition for the whole series.

== 2009 Series ==
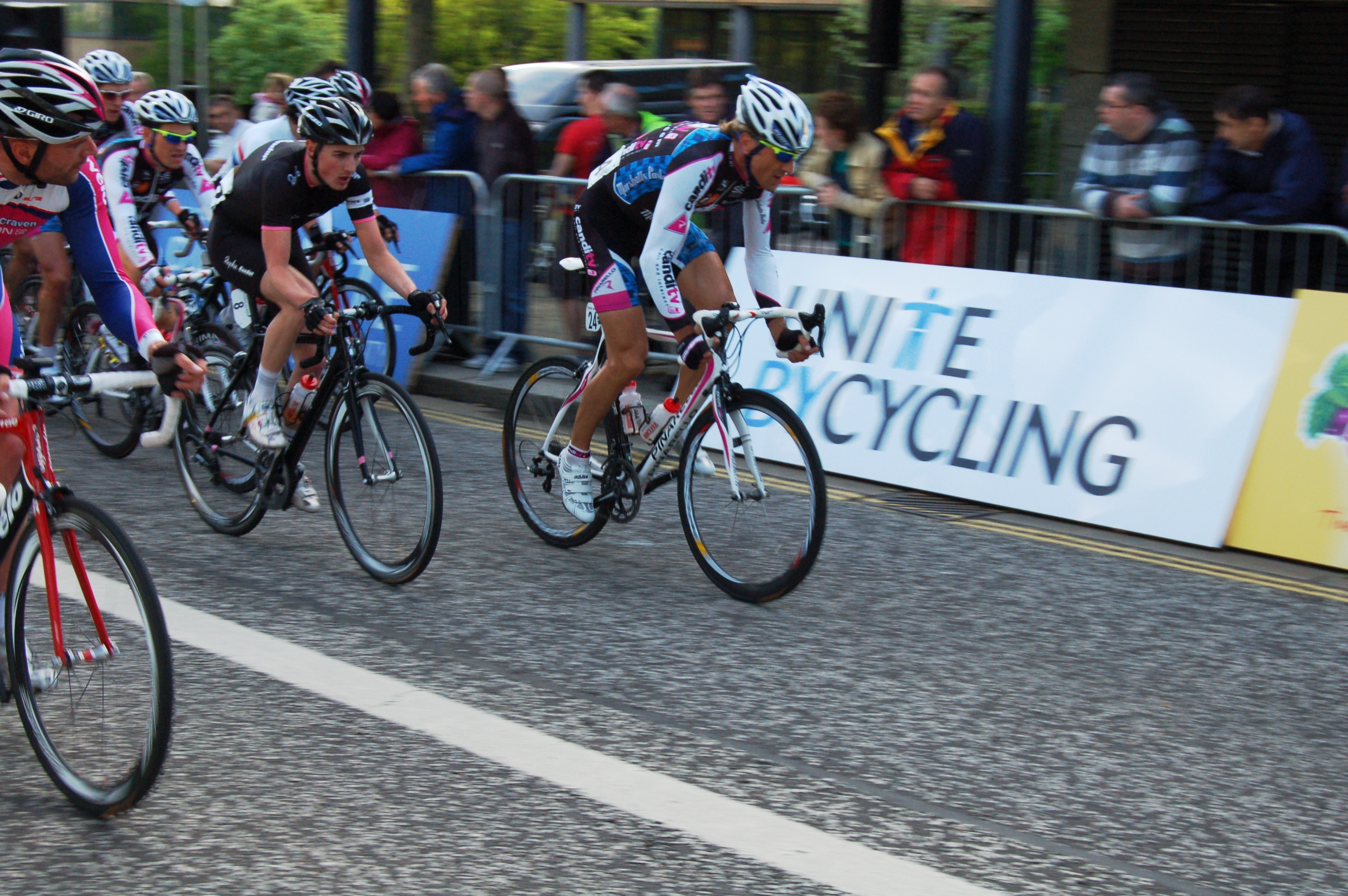
Tour Series 2009

The first series had 10 rounds across England. The first ever round was held in Milton Keynes, and the final round was held in Southend. Halfords BikeHut had the strongest team, made up largely of powerful sprinters who were suited to the criteriums. Few of the circuits were hilly, which was seen to aid Halfords.

Rounds

Round	Date	Location	Team winner	Individual winner	Sprint winner
1	21 May	Milton Keynes	CandiTV–Marshalls Pasta	Graham Briggs	Matt Cronshaw
2	28 May	Exeter	Rapha Condor	Dean Downing	Ed Clancy
3	2 June	Woking	Plowman Craven–Madison.co.uk	Dean Downing	Malcolm Elliott
4	4 June	Peterborough	Team Halfords Bikehut	Ian Wilkinson	Russell Downing
5	9 June	Blackpool	Team Halfords Bikehut	Rob Hayles	Russell Downing
6	11 June	Southport	Team Halfords Bikehut	Ed Clancy	Tony Gibb
7	16 June	Stoke-on-Trent	Rapha Condor	Russell Downing	Dean Downing
8	18 June	Colchester	Team Halfords Bikehut	Tom Southam	Russell Downing
9	23 June	Chester	CandiTV–Marshalls Pasta	Darren Lapthorne	Darren Lapthorne
10	25 June	Southend-on-Sea	Team Halfords Bikehut	Rob Hayles	Russell Downing
Series winners			Team Halfords Bikehut	None	Russell Downing

== 2010 Series ==
The series was now sponsored by Halfords, who no longer had their own team. There were again 10 rounds, including the round at Durham with its steep cobbled climb. This time Motorpoint, led by veteran Malcolm Elliott came out as victors, with Malcolm himself winning in Durham.

Rounds

Round	Date	Location	Team winner	Individual winner	Sprint winner
1	25 May	Canary Wharf	Rapha Condor–Sharp	Tony Gibb	Liam Holohan
2	27 May	Durham	Motorpoint–Marshalls Pasta	Malcolm Elliott	Kristian House
3	1 June	Portsmouth	Motorpoint–Marshalls Pasta	Ian Bibby	Liam Holohan
4	3 June	Exeter	Rapha Condor–Sharp	Dean Downing	Graham Briggs
5	8 June	Southport	Endura Racing	Alexandre Blain	Graham Briggs
6	10 June	Kettering	Rapha Condor–Sharp	Kristian House	Graham Briggs
7	15 June	Peterborough	Rapha Condor–Sharp	Dean Downing	Dean Downing
8	17 June	Stoke-on-Trent	Motorpoint–Marshalls Pasta	Ian Bibby	Graham Briggs
9	21 June	Chester	Endura Racing	Jack Bauer	Kristian House
10	24 June	Woking	Rapha Condor–Sharp	Dean Windsor	Jefte de Bruin
Series winners			Motorpoint–Marshalls Pasta	None	Graham Briggs

== 2011 Series ==
The series was cut to only 8 rounds. The early stages were dominated by Rapha Condor–Sharp who won all of the first four rounds, both individually and as a team. This run was broken by Team Endura in the next two rounds, firstly winning the individual race, and then in the 6th round in Oldham, winning individually and overall.

Rounds

Round	Date	Location	Team winner	Individual winner	Sprint winner
1	24 May	Durham	Rapha Condor–Sharp	Zak Dempster	Kristian House
2	26 May	Aberystwyth	Rapha Condor–Sharp	Ed Clancy	Kristian House
3	31 May	Peterborough	Rapha Condor–Sharp	Graham Briggs	Marcel Six
4	2 June	Colchester	Rapha Condor–Sharp	Dean Downing	Jeroen Janssen
5	7 June	Stoke-on-Trent	Rapha Condor–Sharp	Scott Thwaites	Scott Thwaites
6	9 June	Oldham	Endura Racing	Rob Partridge	Rob Partridge
7	14 June	Woking	Endura Racing	Ian Wilkinson	Steven Lampier
8	16 June	Canary Wharf	Motorpoint Pro–Cycling Team	Jonathan McEvoy	Jonathan McEvoy
Series winners			Rapha Condor–Sharp	None	Steven Lampier

== 2012 Series ==
There were 11 rounds in the 2012 series. The early stages were dominated by Endura Racing who won all of the first four rounds as a team.

Rounds

Round	Date	Location	Team winner	Individual winner	Sprint winner
1	15 May	Kirkcaldy	Endura Racing	Scott Thwaites	Marcel Six
2	17 May	Durham	Endura Racing	Kristian House	Kristian House
3	22 May	Oxford	Endura Racing	Scott Thwaites	Marcel Six
4	24 May	Redditch	Endura Racing	Niklas Gustavsson	Bernard Sulzberger
5	25 May	Aberystwyth	Team UK Youth	Kristian House	Marcel Six
6	29 May	Peterborough	Team Raleigh–GAC	Ed Clancy	Marcel Six
7	31 May	Canary Wharf	Endura Racing	Zak Dempster	Yanto Barker
8	5 June	Torquay	Node 4–Giordana Racing	Marcin Białobłocki	Bernard Sulzberger
9	7 June	Colchester	Endura Racing	Graham Briggs	Graham Briggs
10	12 June	Woking	Endura Racing	Zak Dempster	Zak Dempster
11	14 June	Stoke-on-Trent	Rapha Condor–Sharp	Team Time Trial	
12	14 June	Stoke-on-Trent	Node 4–Giordana Racing	Bernard Sulzberger	Bernard Sulzberger
Series winners			Endura Racing	None	Bernard Sulzberger

== 2013 Series ==
There were 12 rounds in the 2013 series.

Rounds

Round	Date	Location	Team winner	Individual winner	Sprint winner
1	14 May	Kirkcaldy	Team Raleigh	Yanto Barker	Mike Northey
2	16 May	Durham	Team Raleigh	Kristian House	Kristian House
3	21 May	Stoke-on-Trent	Team UK Youth	Yanto Barker	Tom Scully
4	24 May	Aberystwyth	Team UK Youth	Ed Clancy	Alexandre Blain
5	28 May	Torquay	Team UK Youth	Ed Clancy	Alexandre Blain
6	30 May	Colchester	Team UK Youth	Jon Mould	Richard Lang
7	4 June	Redditch	Metaltek-Knights of Old	Tom Scully	Tom Scully
8	6 June	Canary Wharf	Team UK Youth	Chris Opie	Chris Opie
9	11 June	Woking	Team UK Youth	Ed Clancy	Tom Scully
10	13 June	Aylsham	Team UK Youth	Chris Opie	Dean Downing
11	14 June	Ipswich	Team UK Youth	Team Time Trial	
12	14 June	Ipswich	Team UK Youth	Tom Scully	Kristian House
Series winners			Team UK Youth	None	Tom Scully

== 2014 Series ==
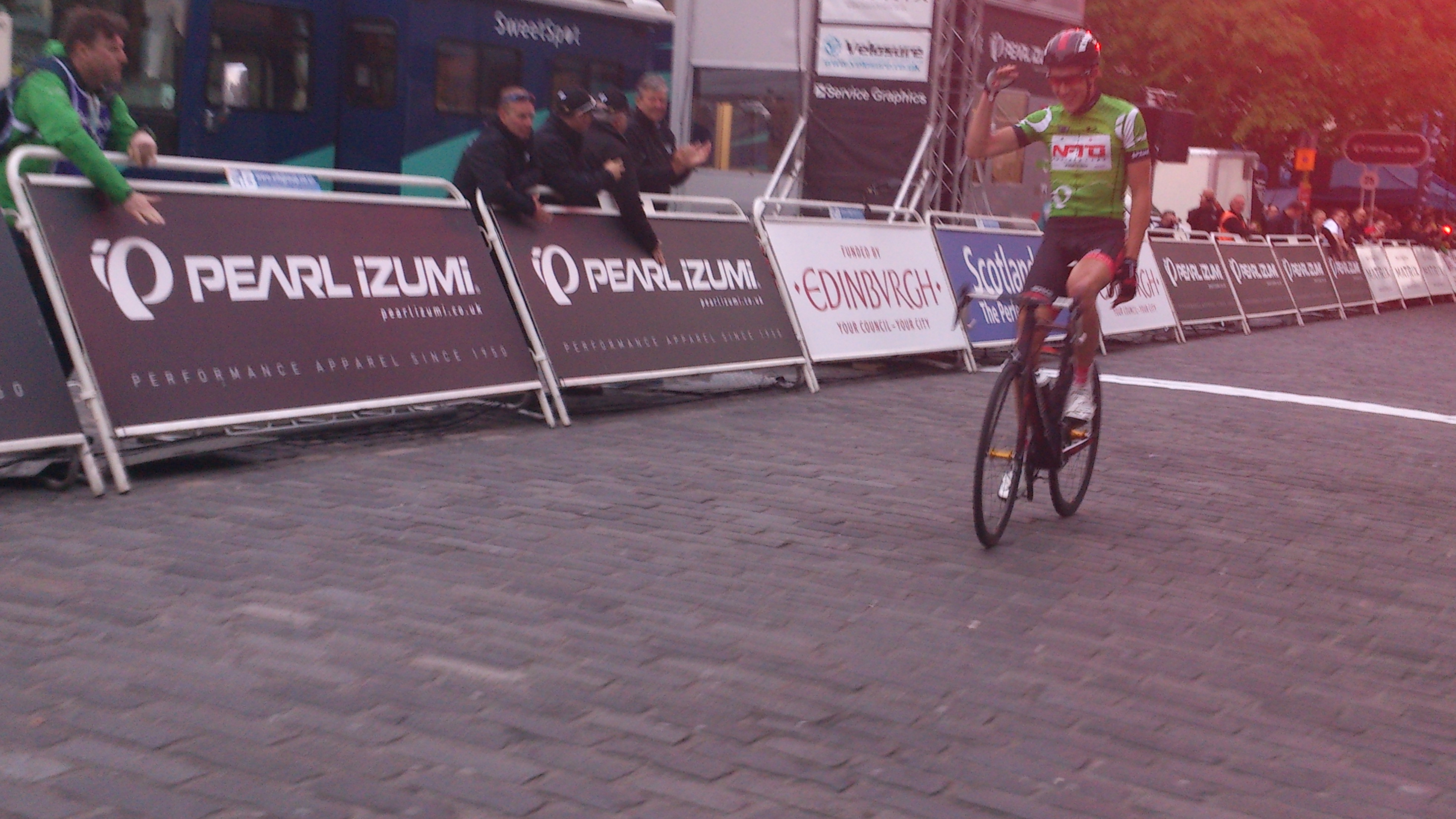
NFTO Pro Cycling's Jon Mould winning Round 6 of the Series in Edinburgh. Mould tied the record of three wins during a season, equalling Ed Clancy.

There were 10 rounds (and 12 races) in the 2014 series.

Rounds

Round	Date	Location	Team winner	Individual winner	Sprint winner
1	13 May	Stoke-on-Trent	Rapha Condor–JLT	Team Time Trial	
1	13 May	Stoke-on-Trent	Madison Genesis	Jon Mould	Jon Mould
2	15 May	BAE Systems, Barrow	Madison Genesis	Graham Briggs	Tom Scully
3	20 May	Peterborough	Rapha Condor–JLT	Matthew Gibson	Mike Northey
4	23 May	Aberystwyth	Rapha Condor–JLT	Felix English	Tom Scully
5	27 May	Durham	Team Raleigh	Jon Mould	Jon Mould
6	29 May	Edinburgh	Team Raleigh	Jon Mould	Jon Mould
7	3 June	Redditch	Rapha Condor–JLT	Matthieu Boulo	Kristian House
8	5 June	Canary Wharf	Rapha Condor–JLT	Tobyn Horton	Kristian House
9	10 June	Woking	Madison Genesis	Tom Stewart	Jon Mould
10	13 June	Gorey, Jersey	Rapha Condor–JLT	Matthieu Boulo	Hill climb
10	13 June	Gorey, Jersey	Madison Genesis	Tom Stewart	Kristian House
Series winners			Rapha Condor–JLT	None	Jon Mould

== 2015 Series ==
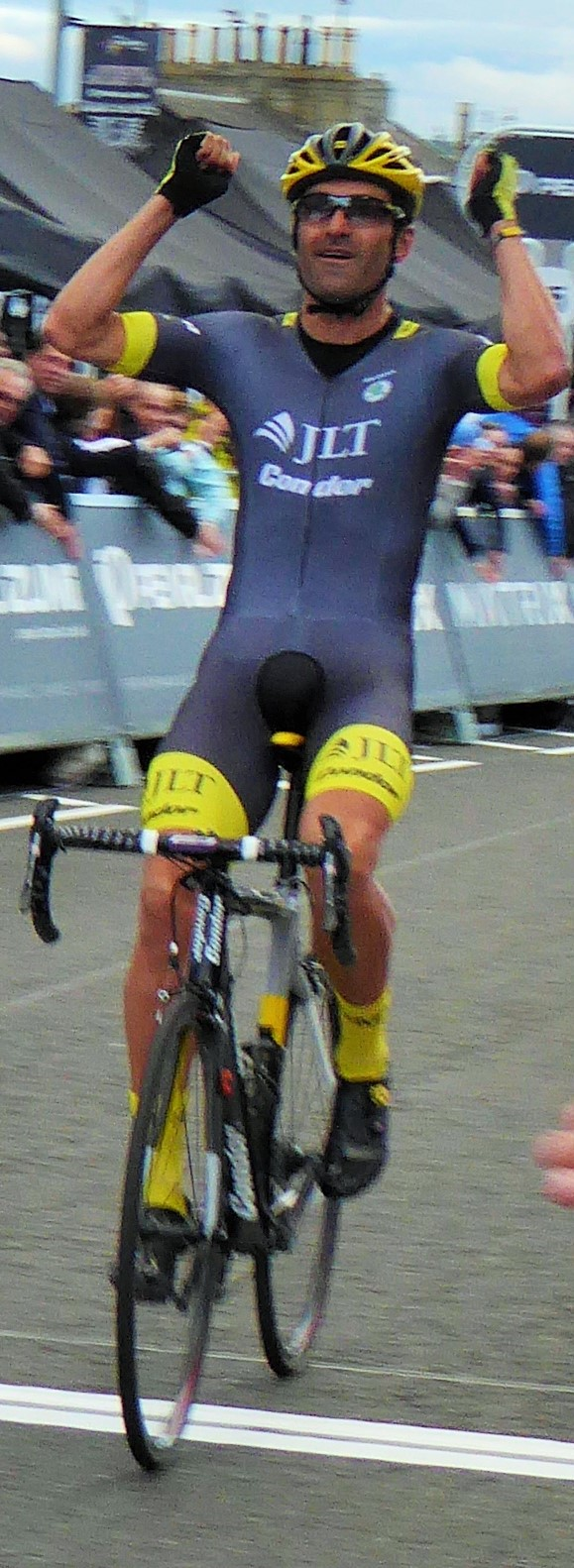
Kristian House celebrates winning Round 4 of the Series in Motherwell.

There were 10 rounds (and 12 races) in the 2015 series.

Rounds

Round	Date	Location	Team winner	Individual winner	Points winner
1	14 May	Ryde	ONE Pro Cycling	Team Time Trial	
1	14 May	Ryde	ONE Pro Cycling	Tom Scully	Tom Stewart
2	19 May	Redditch	Madison Genesis	Jon Mould	Morgan Kneisky
3	22 May	Aberystwyth	ONE Pro Cycling	George Harper	Hill climb
3	22 May	Aberystwyth	Madison Genesis	Ed Clancy	Ed Clancy
4	26 May	Motherwell	Madison Genesis	Kristian House	Chris Opie
5	28 May	Durham	ONE Pro Cycling	Richard Handley	Richard Handley
6	29 May	Barrow	Madison Genesis	Chris Lawless	Morgan Kneisky
7	2 June	Croydon	ONE Pro Cycling	Marcin Białobłocki	Tom Stewart
8	4 June	Canary Wharf	ONE Pro Cycling	Steele Von Hoff	Jon Mould
9	9 June	Peterborough	ONE Pro Cycling	Ed Clancy	Morgan Kneisky
10	11 June	Bath	Madison Genesis	Marcin Białobłocki	Marcin Białobłocki
Series winners			Madison Genesis	None	Morgan Kneisky

== 2016 Series ==
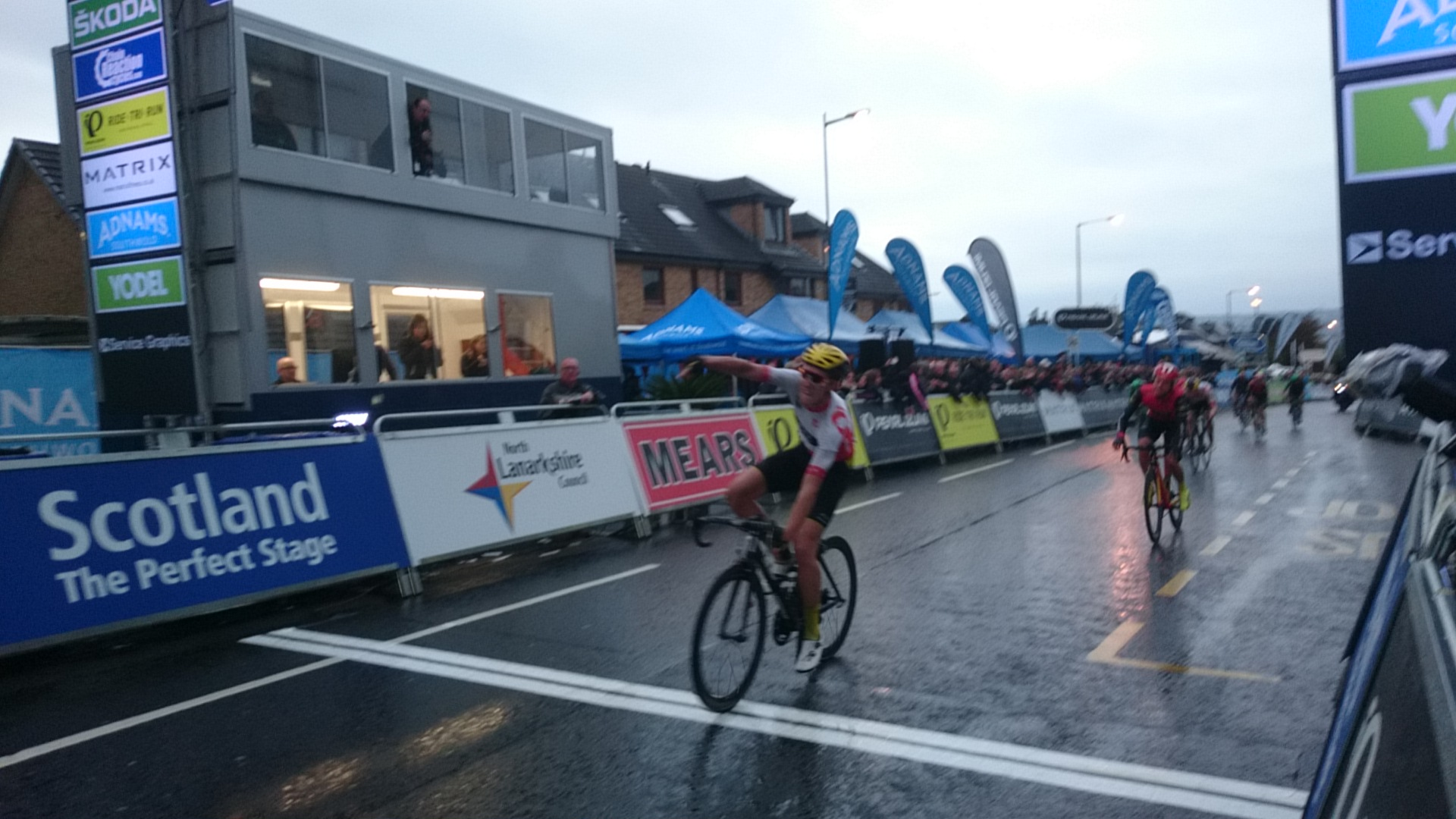
Jon Mould celebrates victory in Round 2 at Motherwell. Mould set records for most wins in a single Tour Series (6), and surpassed JLT–Condor teammate Ed Clancy for most wins in the competition's history.

There were 10 rounds (and 11 races) in the 2016 series.

Rounds

Round	Date	Location	Team winner	Individual winner	Points winner
1	12 May	Ramsey, Isle of Man	JLT–Condor	Team time trial	
1	12 May	Ramsey, Isle of Man	JLT–Condor	Chris Lawless	Morgan Kneisky
2	17 May	Motherwell	JLT–Condor	Jon Mould	Albert Torres
3	19 May	Edinburgh	Madison Genesis	Graham Briggs	Rory Townsend
4	26 May	Redditch	Pedal Heaven	Jon Mould	Jon Mould
5	27 May	Aberystwyth	JLT–Condor	Jon Mould	Tom Stewart
6	31 May	Durham	Team Raleigh–GAC	Jon Mould	Chris Lawless
7	2 June	Stoke-on-Trent	JLT–Condor	Chris Lawless	Chris Lawless
8	6 June	Stevenage	JLT–Condor	Jon Mould	Chris Lawless
9	7 June	Croydon	Madison Genesis	Jon Mould	Sebastián Mora
10	9 June	Portsmouth	Pedal Heaven	Alexandre Blain	Chris Lawless
Series winners			JLT–Condor	None	Rory Townsend

== 2017 Series ==
There were 10 rounds (and 11 races) in the 2017 series, condensed into the month of May and including Saturday night races for the first time.

Rounds

Round	Date	Location	Team winner	Individual winner	Points winner
1	9 May	Redditch	JLT–Condor	Team Time Trial	
1	9 May	Redditch	JLT–Condor	Chris Opie	Sebastián Mora
2	11 May	Stoke-on-Trent	Madison Genesis	Brenton Jones	Sebastián Mora
3	12 May	Northwich	Madison Genesis	Enrique Sanz	Jonathan McEvoy
4	16 May	Wembley	JLT–Condor	Steele Von Hoff	Sebastián Mora
5	18 May	Croydon	JLT–Condor	Graham Briggs	Sebastián Mora
6	20 May	Bath	Madison Genesis	Connor Swift	Sebastián Mora
7	23 May	Motherwell	JLT–Condor	Brenton Jones	Brenton Jones
8	25 May	Aberdeen	Bike Channel–Canyon	Jack Pullar	Harry Tanfield
9	27 May	Durham	JLT–Condor	Tom Pidcock (Note: Pidcock was the first guest rider to win an individual race. The highest-placed rider eligible for points was second-placed Connor Swift.)	Connor Swift
10	29 May	Stevenage	Madison Genesis	Connor Swift	James Lowsley-Williams
Series winners			JLT–Condor	None	Sebastián Mora

== 2018 Series ==
The 2018 series was announced in April, with a scheduled eight rounds and 10 races taking place from 10 to 31 May.

Rounds

Round	Date	Location	Men's events			Women's events		
Round	Date	Location	Team winner	Individual winner	Points winner	Team winner	Individual winner	Points winner
1	10 May	Redditch	JLT–Condor	Gabriel Cullaigh	James Lowsley-Williams	Team Breeze	Megan Barker	Anna Henderson
2	15 May	Motherwell	Madison Genesis	Matthew Gibson	Matthew Gibson	Team Breeze	Megan Barker	Megan Barker
3	17 May	Aberdeen	Canyon Eisberg	Ed Clancy	Harry Tanfield	Storey Racing	Nikki Juniper	Nikki Juniper
4	22 May	Durham	Madison Genesis	Jack Pullar	Hillclimb	—N/a		
4	22 May	Durham	Madison Genesis	Andy Tennant	Matthew Gibson	NJC–Biemme–Echelon	Nikki Juniper	Nikki Juniper
5	26 May	Aberystwyth	JLT–Condor	Harry Tanfield	Matthew Gibson	Trek–Drops	Anna Henderson	Anna Henderson
6	28 May	Stevenage	Canyon Eisberg	Team time trial		—N/a		
6	28 May	Stevenage	Canyon Eisberg	Harry Tanfield	Robert Scott	Team Breeze	Anna Henderson	Anna Henderson
7	29 May	Wembley Park	Madison Genesis	Tom Pidcock	Connor Swift	Team OnForm	Elizabeth-Jane Harris	Elizabeth-Jane Harris
8 (Note: Denoted by the Series as the "Grand Final".)	31 May	Salisbury	Canyon Eisberg	Ed Clancy	Harry Tanfield	Storey Racing	Nikki Juniper	Nikki Juniper
Series winners			Canyon Eisberg	None	Matthew Gibson	Team Breeze	None	Nikki Juniper

== 2019 Series ==
The 2019 series was announced in April, with a scheduled seven rounds taking place from 9 to 25 May.

Rounds

Round	Date	Location	Men's events			Women's events		
Round	Date	Location	Team winner	Individual winner	Points winner	Team winner	Individual winner	Points winner
1	9 May	Redditch	Madison Genesis	Connor Swift	Connor Swift	Brother UK–Tifosi p/b OnForm	Jessica Roberts	Anna Henderson
2	14 May	Motherwell	Canyon dhb p/b Bloor Homes	Jacob Hennessy	Joey Walker	Team Breeze	Jessica Roberts	Jessica Roberts
3	16 May	Aberdeen	Canyon dhb p/b Bloor Homes	Alex Paton	Freddie Scheske	Team Breeze	Jessica Roberts	Jo Tindley
4	18 May	Durham	Madison Genesis	Joey Walker	Joey Walker	Brother UK–Tifosi p/b OnForm	Anna Henderson	Jessica Roberts
5	21 May	Birkenhead	Canyon dhb p/b Bloor Homes	Matthew Bostock	Steven Lampier	Brother UK–Tifosi p/b OnForm	Rebecca Durrell	Jo Tindley
6	23 May	Salisbury	Vitus Pro Cycling Team p/b Brother UK	Freddie Scheske	Freddie Scheske	Brother UK–Tifosi p/b OnForm	Rebecca Durrell	Rebecca Durrell
7	25 May	Brooklands	Canyon dhb p/b Bloor Homes	Rory Townsend	Steven Lampier	Team Breeze	Anna Henderson	Anna Henderson
Series winners			Canyon dhb p/b Bloor Homes	None	Steven Lampier	Brother UK–Tifosi p/b OnForm	None	Jessica Roberts

== 2021 Series ==
Following the cancellation of the 2020 event, the 2021 series was announced in June, with a scheduled three rounds taking place from 8 to 12 August.

Rounds

Round	Date	Location	Men's events			Women's events		
Round	Date	Location	Team winner	Individual winner	Points winner	Team winner	Individual winner	Points winner
1	8 August	Guisborough	Ribble Weldtite	Matthew Gibson	Matthew Gibson	Great Britain U23 Track Team	Eluned King	Jo Tindley
2	10 August	Sunderland	Canyon dhb SunGod	Will Roberts	Will Roberts	CAMS–Basso Bikes	Megan Barker	Jo Tindley
3	12 August	Castle Douglas	Canyon dhb SunGod	Charlie Tanfield	Charlie Tanfield	CAMS–Basso Bikes	Megan Barker	Jo Tindley
Series winners			Ribble Weldtite	None	Matthew Gibson	CAMS–Basso Bikes	None	Jo Tindley

== 2022 Series ==
The 2022 series venues were announced in February and March, initially with six rounds until a Grand Final in Manchester was added to the schedule.

The series was sponsored by Sportsbreaks.com.

Rounds

Round	Date	Location	Men's events			Women's events		
Round	Date	Location	Team winner	Individual winner	Points winner	Team winner	Individual winner	Points winner
1	2 May	Guisborough	WiV SunGod	Thomas Mein	Thomas Mein	Pro-Noctis–Rotor–Redchilli Bikes	Sophie Lewis	Jo Tindley
2	4 May	Galashiels	WiV SunGod	Jim Brown	Matthew Bostock	Pro-Noctis–Rotor–Redchilli Bikes	Megan Barker	Jo Tindley
3	10 May	Sunderland	Ribble Weldtite	Blake Quick	Harry Tanfield	Jadan–Vive le Velo	Sammie Stuart	Suzetta Guerrini
4	12 May	Stranraer	Ribble Weldtite	Luke Lamperti	Harry Tanfield	Pro-Noctis–Rotor–Redchilli Bikes	Emma Jeffers	Sammie Stuart
5	19 May	Clacton-on-Sea	WiV SunGod	Matthew Bostock	Matthew Bostock	Team Spectra Wiggle p/b Vitus	Sammie Stuart	Sammie Stuart
6	21 May	Barking	Ribble Weldtite	Ollie Peckover	Matthew Bostock	Torelli–Assure–Cayman Islands–Scimitar	Ellen McDermott	Jo Tindley
7	24 May	Manchester	WiV SunGod	Matthew Bostock	Matthew Bostock	Team Boompods	Emma Jeffers	Sammie Stuart
Series winners			WiV SunGod	None	Matthew Bostock	Pro-Noctis–Rotor–Redchilli Bikes	None	Jo Tindley

== 2023 ==
Event organisers SweetSpot announced in February 2023 that the Tour Series would not take place in 2023, citing pressures on local authority funding and wider economic challenges as the reasons. They stated that they would work on plans for the Series to return in 2024.
