= Steven Lampier =

British cyclist (born 1984)

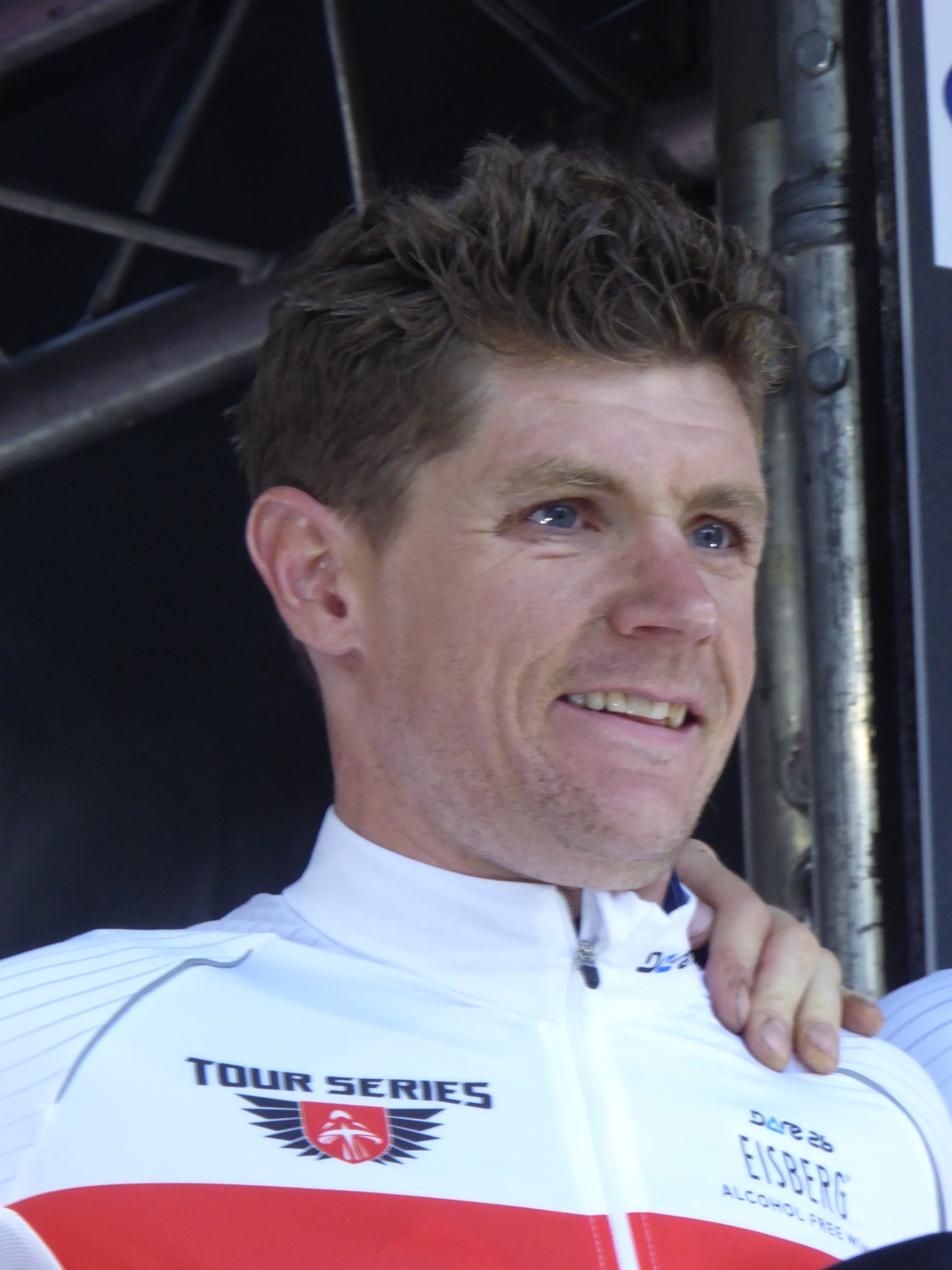
- Lampier during the 2017 Tour Series.

Personal information
- Full name: Steven James Lampier
- Nickname: Lamps
- Born: 2 March 1984 (age 42) Truro, Cornwall, England
- Height: 1.75 m (5 ft 9 in)
- Weight: 68 kg (150 lb; 10.7 st)

Cycling career
- Sport: Cycling
- Current team: Saint Piran
- Discipline: Road
- Role: Rider; Team manager
- Rider type: Rouleur

Amateur teams
- 2005–2006: Caja Rural
- 2007: Kingsnorth International Wheelers
- 2008: Cycling Team Deschuytter
- 2009: Kinesis UK
- 2010: Pendragon–Le Col
- 2018–2019: Saint Piran
- 2020: Saint Piran

Professional teams
- 2011–2012: Sigma Sport–Specialized
- 2013–2014: Node 4–Giordana Racing
- 2015: Team Raleigh
- 2016–2017: JLT–Condor
- 2020: Ribble Weldtite
- 2021–: Saint Piran

Managerial teams
- 2018–2019: Saint Piran
- 2020–2021: Saint Piran

Steven James "Steve" Lampier (born 2 March 1984) is a British former road racing cyclist, who currently manages UCI Continental team Saint Piran. He previously rode for Ribble Weldtite in 2020, JLT–Condor in 2016 and 2017, Team Raleigh in 2015 and Velosure–Giordana in 2013 and 2014.

== Biography ==
From Helston, Cornwall, Lampier is based in Falmouth, Cornwall. In December 2014 Team Raleigh announced that Lampier would join them for the 2015 season.

== Major results ==
2005
2nd Time trial, National Under-23 Road Championships
2010
1st Stage 3 Tour of Doonhame
7th Grand Prix Of Al Fatah
9th East Midlands International CiCLE Classic
2011
1st Sprints classification Tour Series
1st Wally Gimber Trophy
4th Woking Tour Series
5th Glade Spring Road Race
6th Overall Tour of Doonhame
6th East Yorkshire Classic Premier Calendar
2012
1st John Hinksman Memorial
8th Overall Tour Doon Hame
2013
2nd Grand Prix of Wales
2014
1st Coalville Wheelers Road Race
7th Beaumont Trophy
2015
1st Overall British Cycling Elite Road Series

4th Stafford Kermesse
4th Ryedale Grand Prix

1st British Cycling Spring Cup

2nd Chorley Grand Prix
2nd Overall Tour of the Reservoir

1st Overall Totnes-Vire Stage Race

1st Stage 3

2nd Wally Gimber Trophy
4th Sheffrec CC Spring Road Race
2016
4th Chorley Grand Prix
5th Overall New Zealand Cycle Classic
2017
6th Overall New Zealand Cycle Classic
7th Overall Tour de Normandie
7th Beaumont Trophy
2018
4th Gravel and Tar
2019
1st Points classification Tour Series
9th Rutland–Melton International CiCLE Classic
