= Graham Briggs =

British road racing cyclist (born 1983)

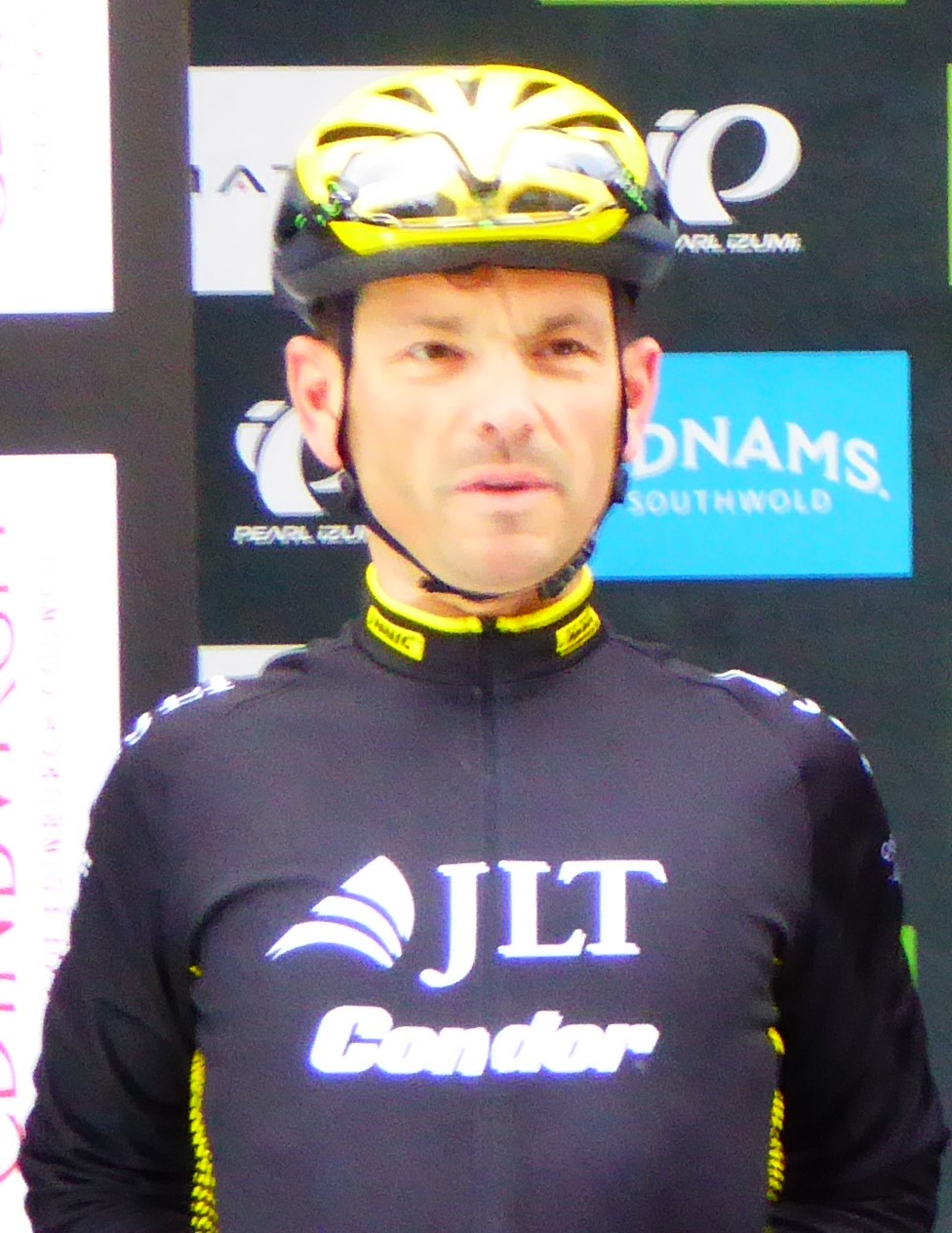
- Briggs in 2016.

Personal information
- Full name: Graham Briggs
- Nickname: The Graftdyke Express or Ferrit
- Born: 14 July 1983 (age 43) Doncaster, South Yorkshire, United Kingdom

Cycling career
- Sport: Cycling
- Current team: Clancy Briggs Cycling Academy
- Discipline: Road
- Role: Rider
- Rider type: Sprinter

Amateur teams
- 2006: Agisko–Dart–Cycling.tv
- 2020–: Clancy Briggs Cycling Academy

Professional teams
- 2007–2008: Recycling.co.uk
- 2009: CandiTV–Marshalls Pasta
- 2010–2011: Rapha Condor–Sharp
- 2012–2013: Team Raleigh–GAC
- 2014–2018: Rapha Condor–JLT
- 2019: Vitus Pro Cycling Team p/b Brother UK

Graham Briggs (born 14 July 1983) is a British road racing cyclist, who currently rides for the British amateur team Clancy Briggs Cycling Academy.

== Career ==
Born in Rossington, Doncaster, South Yorkshire, Briggs initially played football as a youngster before switching to cycling, initially off-road as a cyclo-cross rider and then the discipline of mountain biking, until the foot and mouth crisis of 2001. He competed for Great Britain in the Under-23 road race at the 2003 UCI Road World Championships in Hamilton, Ontario, Canada. The majority of his road racing career has been spent in city centre competitions leading to successes in the Elite Circuit Race Series in recent years.

Briggs is classed as a sprinter and was the winner of the British National Circuit Race Championships in 2011.

Briggs left Team Raleigh at the end of the 2013 season and joined Rapha Condor–JLT for the 2014 season; his third spell with the latter squad.

Graham Briggs is a co-founder of the Clancy Briggs Cycling Academy with the mission "to move a generation of children, putting the bicycle back at the heart of childhood play, forming lifelong habits that will deliver benefits for health and the environment for years to come."

== Major results ==
2001
3rd Road race, National Junior Road Championships
2007
5th Overall Girvan Three Day
2008
3rd Blackpool Grand Prix Circuit Race
3rd Clayton Velo Spring Classic
7th Overall Tour du Loir-et-Cher
8th National Criterium Championships
2009
1st Round 1 – Milton Keynes, Tour Series
1st Stage 2 Girvan Three Day
2nd Blackburn Grand Prix
4th Brighouse Circuit Race
4th Warwick Town Centre Race
7th Colne Grand Prix
8th East Yorkshire Classic Circuit Race
10th Tour of the Reservoir
2010
2nd Blackburn Grand Prix
3rd Dumfries Bike Fest Grand Prix
7th Dumfries Elite Circuit Series Race
7th Newport Nocturne
2011
1st National Criterium Championships
2nd Wales Open Criterium
2nd Glade Spring Road Race
4th Smithfield Nocturne
6th Jock Wadley Memorial
2012
1st Overall British Cycling Elite Circuit Race Series

1st Brighouse Circuit Race
1st Wales Open Criterium
2nd Colne Grand Prix
5th East Yorkshire Classic

10th Sheffrec CC Spring Road Race
2013
2nd Monsal Hill-Climb
4th Colne Grand Prix
4th Wales Open Criterium
10th Ryedale Grand Prix
2014
1st Overall Tour du Loir et Cher

1st Stage 3

1st Legstretchers Memorial to Betty Pharoah Road Race
1st Round 2 – Barrow-in-Furness, Tour Series
1st Milk Race
1st Colne Grand Prix
1st Wales Open Criterium
2nd National Criterium Championships
2nd Eddie Soens Memorial
2nd Newport Nocturne
3rd Beverley Grand Prix
3rd Jock Wadley Memorial Road Race
5th Overall New Zealand Cycle Classic
10th Stockton Grand Prix
2015
1st Chepstow Grand Prix
1st Wales Open Criterium
2nd National Criterium Championships
3rd Stockton Grand Prix
3rd Grand Prix of Wales
3rd Hitter Road Race
8th Leicester Castle Classic
2016
1st Round 3 - Edinburgh, Tour Series

2nd - Aberystwyth, Tour Series
3rd - Stevenage, Tour Series
1st - Colne, Tour Series
2nd - Stage 2, Tour of Britain
2017
1st - Croyden, Tour Series
3rd - Stevenage, Tour Series
3rd - Rydale Grand Prix
2nd - London Nocturne
2018
9th - Prologue, Herald Sun Tour
3rd - Aberystwyth, Tour Series
1st - Rydale Grand Prix
