= London Nocturne =

British criterium cycling race

Race details
- Date: June
- Region: London, England
- Discipline: Road
- Type: Criterium
- Organiser: City of London Corporation and Nocturne Series

History (men)
- First edition: 2007
- Editions: 13
- First winner: James McCallum (GBR)
- Most wins: Ed Clancy (GBR) (2 wins)
- Most recent: Matt Bostock (GBR)

History (women)
- First edition: 2009
- Editions: 11
- First winner: Hannah Barnes (GBR)
- Most wins: Hannah Barnes (GBR) (5 wins)
- Most recent: Nina Lavenu (FRA)

The London Nocturne (formerly the Smithfield Nocturne) is a cycling race in London, England, organised as a criterium in the City of London. The event was originally held from 2007 to 2018, using a 1.2 kilometre course, and took place as part of a celebration of cycling during the afternoon and evening, such as those involving penny-farthings and folding bicycles. It was first run in 2007 for men and in 2009 for women. Despite not being on the UCI Europe Tour, the race nonetheless attracted some high-profile names, such as Ed Clancy, Mark Cavendish, Matthew Goss, Davide Appollonio, Magnus Bäckstedt, and Sarah Storey.

After eight years the event was revived in 2026 as the City of London Nocturne, returning as a two day festival of racing on 12th & 13th of June 2026.The new course was a 1.3 kilometre closed road circuit through Cheapside and Bank. The 2026 edition is registered on the UCI Calendar in the Pro Criterium class.

The 2026 elite races were won by Matt Bostock and Nina Lavenu. The 2027 event will be held on Friday 11 and Saturday 12 June 2027.

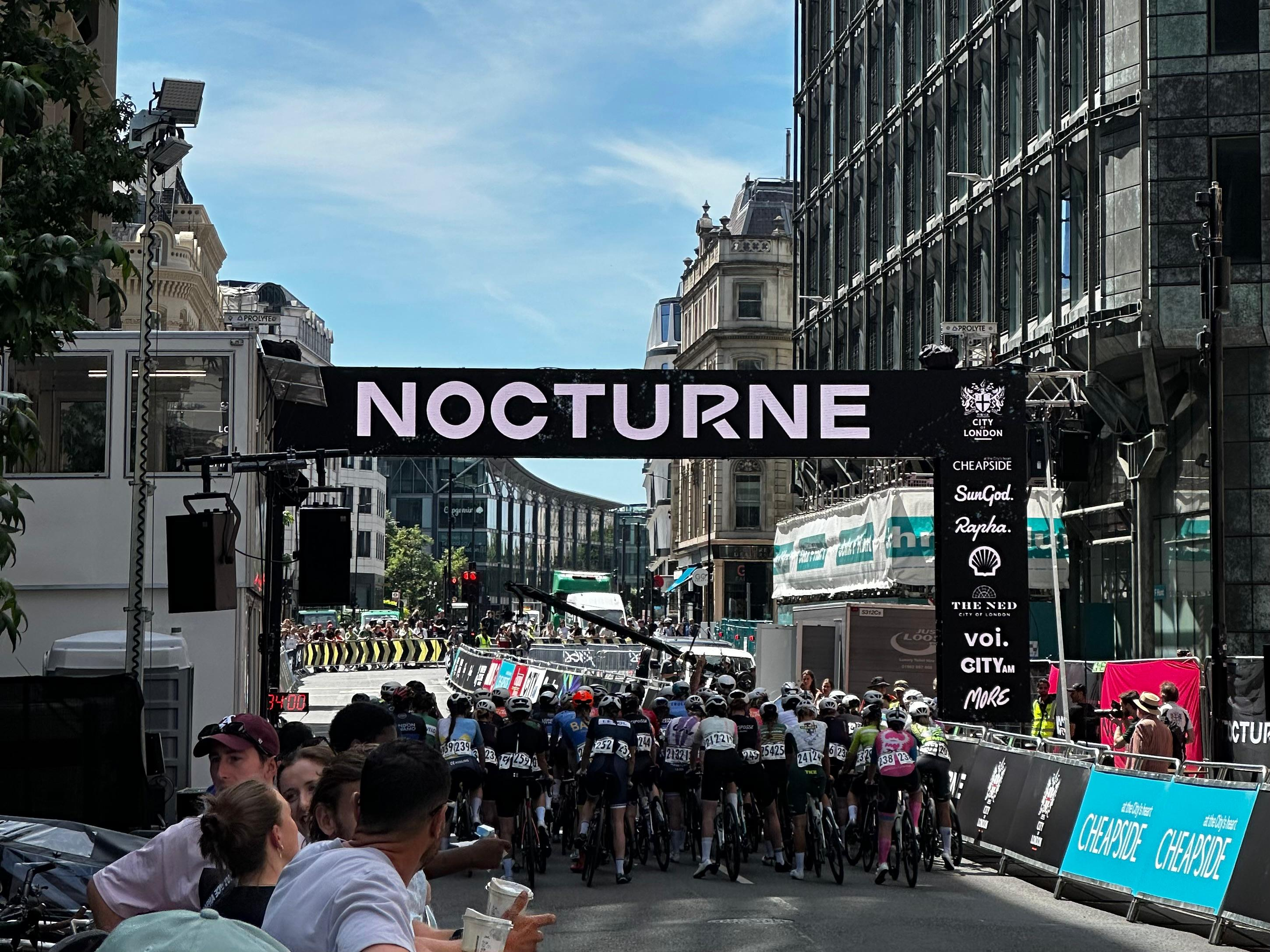
Start line of the women’s support 2/3/4 category race at the 2026 London Nocturne, held on Cheapside in the City of London. Riders are lined up beneath the event banner as the race is about to begin.

== Past winners ==
=== Elite Women ===
Year	Country	Rider	Team
2009	Great Britain	Hannah Barnes	CandiTV–Marshalls Pasta
2010	Great Britain	Hannah Barnes	Motorpoint–Marshalls Pasta
2011	Great Britain	Hannah Barnes	Motorpoint Pro–Cycling Team
2012	Great Britain	Hannah Barnes	Team Ibis Cycles
2013	Great Britain	Hannah Barnes	MG-Maxifuel Pro Cycling
2014	Great Britain	Nicola Juniper	Team Echelon Rotor
2015	Great Britain	Katie Archibald	Pearl Izumi–Boot Out Breast Cancer
2016	Great Britain	Alice Barnes	Drops
2017	Great Britain	Lucy Shaw	Drops
2018	Great Britain	Louise Heywood-Mahé	Les Filles Racing Team
2026	France	Nina Lavenu	AG Insurance–Soudal Devo

=== Elite Men ===
Year	Country	Rider	Team
2007	Great Britain	James McCallum	Plowman Craven-Evans Cycles
2008	Great Britain	Geraint Thomas	Barloworld
2009	Great Britain	Russell Downing	CandiTV–Marshalls Pasta
2010	Great Britain	Ian Bibby	Motorpoint–Marshalls Pasta
2011	Great Britain	Alex Dowsett	Team Sky
2012	Great Britain	Ian Stannard	Team Sky
2013	New Zealand	Tom Scully	Team Raleigh
2014	Great Britain	Tobyn Horton	Madison Genesis
2015	Great Britain	Ed Clancy	JLT–Condor
2016	Great Britain	Chris Lawless	JLT–Condor
2017	Australia	Brenton Jones	JLT–Condor
2018	Great Britain	Ed Clancy	JLT–Condor
2026	Great Britain	Matt Bostock	Rapha CC
