= Matthew Gibson (cyclist) =

British cyclist (born 1996)

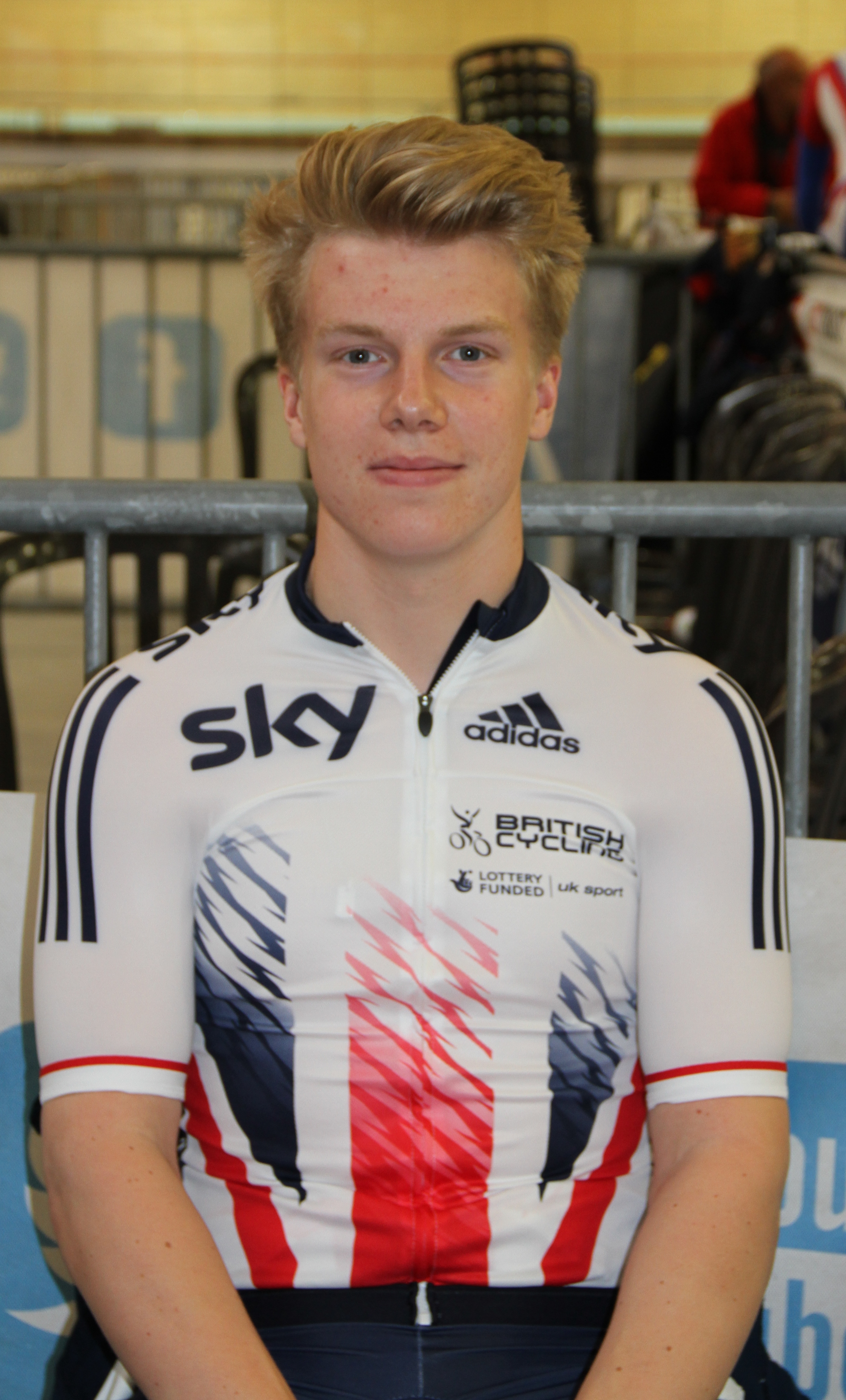
- Gibson at the 2015 UEC European Track Championships

Personal information
- Full name: Matthew Lewis Gibson
- Born: 2 September 1996 (age 30) Lymm, United Kingdom
- Height: 1.83 m (6 ft 0 in)
- Weight: 76 kg (168 lb)

Cycling career
- Sport: Cycling
- Current team: Saint Piran
- Disciplines: Road; Track
- Role: Rider
- Rider type: All-rounder

Amateur teams
- 2012–2014: Velocity WD40
- 2015–2016: 100% ME

Professional teams
- 2017–2018: JLT–Condor
- 2019–2020: Burgos BH
- 2021: Ribble Weldtite
- 2022: WiV SunGod
- 2022–2023: Human Powered Health
- 2024–: Saint Piran

Matthew Lewis Gibson (born 2 September 1996) is a British professional racing cyclist, who currently rides for UCI Continental team Saint Piran.

A former member of the British Cycling Olympic Academy Programme, Gibson specialises in endurance and timed events and came 5th and 10th in the Junior Time Trial at the 2013 and 2014 UCI Road World Championships, respectively. Gibson was selected to represent Great Britain at the 2015 UCI Track Cycling World Championships and, at 18 years old, he was the youngest rider on the squad.

== Major results ==
2013
National Junior Track Championships

1st Individual pursuit
1st Kilo

5th Time trial, UCI Junior Road World Championships
10th Overall Trofeo Karlsberg
2014
1st Individual pursuit, National Junior Track Championships
1st Peterborough, Tour Series
1st Six Days of Ghent Future Stars (with Chris Lawless)
3rd Overall Junior Tour of Wales
6th Overall Course de la Paix Juniors

1st Stage 2a (ITT)

10th Time trial, UCI Junior Road World Championships
2015
1st Team pursuit, UEC European Track Championships
UEC European Under-23 Track Championships

1st Scratch
1st Team pursuit

3rd Team pursuit, UCI Track World Cup, Cali
3rd Road race, National Under-23 Road Championships
2017
2nd Overall Bay Classic Series
2018
1st National Criterium Championships
1st Stage 3 New Zealand Cycle Classic
1st Stage 5 Tour de l'Avenir
1st Stage 5 Tour du Loir-et-Cher
Tour Series

1st Points classification
1st Motherwell

3rd GP Izola
10th Overall Tour de Normandie

1st Points classification
1st Stage 6

2019
1st Stage 13 Tour of Qinghai Lake
6th Overall Tour of China I
2022
1st Stage 1b Olympia's Tour
