= Harry Tanfield =

British cyclist (born 1994)

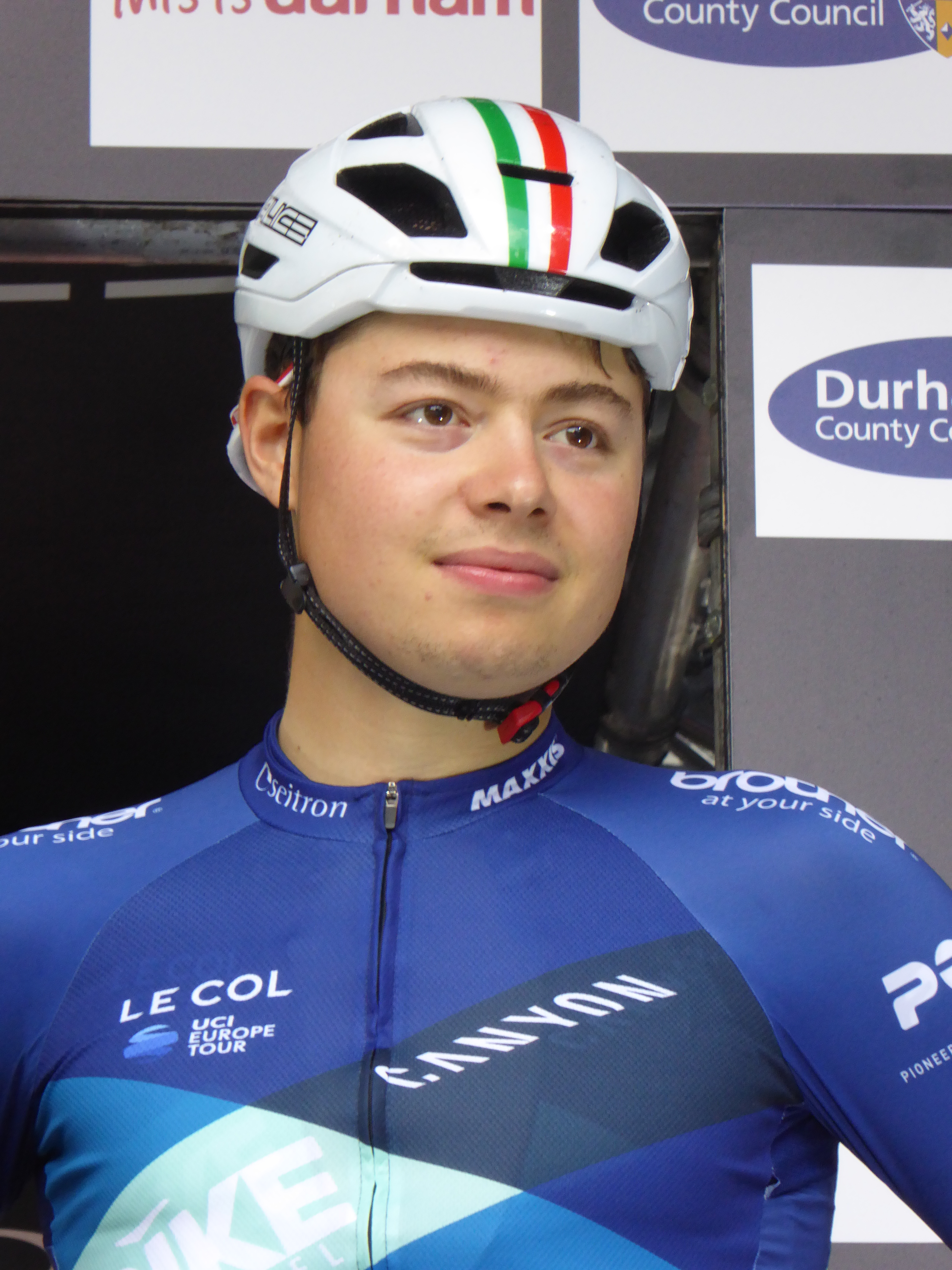
- Tanfield in 2017

Personal information
- Full name: Harry Tanfield
- Born: 17 November 1994 (age 31) Great Ayton, England
- Height: 1.9 m (6 ft 3 in)
- Weight: 79.5 kg (175 lb)

Cycling career
- Sport: Cycling
- Current team: Saint Piran
- Discipline: Road
- Role: Rider

Amateur teams
- 2013: Velo 29–Blackhawk
- 2014: CT 2020 Brugge
- 2014: KTM–Road and Trail.com

Professional teams
- 2015: JLT–Condor
- 2016: Pedal Heaven
- 2017–2018: Bike Channel–Canyon
- 2019: Team Katusha–Alpecin
- 2020: AG2R La Mondiale
- 2021: Team Qhubeka Assos
- 2022: Ribble Weldtite
- 2023: TDT–Unibet Cycling Team
- 2024–: Saint Piran
Medal record
Men's road bicycle racing
Representing Great Britain
World Championships
Bronze medal – third place	2019 Yorkshire	Team time trial mixed relay
Representing England
Commonwealth Games
Silver medal – second place	2018 Gold Coast	Time trial

Harry Tanfield (born 17 November 1994) is a British cyclist, who currently rides for UCI Continental team Saint Piran.

== Early life ==
Tanfield grew up in Great Ayton in Yorkshire, England. He attended Stokesley School.

== Career ==
Tanfield rode for JLT–Condor in 2015 and Pedal Heaven in 2016, before joining Bike Channel–Canyon for the 2017 season.

At the British National Track Championships, Tanfield finished third as part of the men's team pursuit and second in the men's omnium.

He won a Silver medal in the Commonwealth Games in the Men's Individual Time Trial.

On 3 May 2018 he won the opening stage of the Tour de Yorkshire road race, from Beverley to Doncaster. Later in May, Tanfield won consecutive rounds of the Tour Series criterium competition in Aberystwyth and Stevenage, and was part of the Canyon Eisberg team that won the series overall.

In August 2018 it was announced that Tanfield would step up to the UCI World Tour for 2019, signing a two-year contract with Team Katusha–Alpecin. He left the team after one season, and joined AG2R La Mondiale for the 2020 season. In October 2020, he was named in the startlist for the 2020 Vuelta a España. After his contract was not extended into 2021, Tanfield initially announced his intention to join Ribble Weldtite in November 2020, but the following month, he signed a contract to remain at World Tour level, with Team Qhubeka Assos. In 2022 Tanfield signed with the british team Ribble Weldtite.

== Personal life ==
His brother Charlie Tanfield, who is two years younger than him, is also a medal winning cyclist.

== Major results ==
=== Road ===
2012
2nd Overall National Junior Series
2014
5th Time trial, National Under-23 Championships
2015
3rd Rutland–Melton CiCLE Classic
2016
1st Stage 7 Tour of Poyang Lake
2017
1st Stage 1 Tour of Quanzhou Bay
2nd National Criterium Championships
2nd Antwerpse Havenpijl
5th Time trial, National Championships
5th Duo Normand (with Charlie Tanfield)
6th Hong Kong Challenge
9th Memorial Van Coningsloo
10th Ronde van Overijssel
2018
1st Stage 1 Tour de Yorkshire
Tour Series

1st Aberystwyth
1st Stevenage

2nd Time trial, Commonwealth Games
2nd Time trial, National Championships
2nd Ronde van Overijssel
2nd Midden–Brabant Poort Omloop
2019
3rd Team relay, UCI World Championships
2021
National Championships

2nd Criterium
4th Road race

2022
2nd Omloop Mandel-Leie-Schelde
9th Ronde van de Achterhoek
2023
1st Heusden Koers

==== Grand Tour general classification results timeline ====
Grand Tour	2020
Giro d'Italia	—
Tour de France	—
Vuelta a España	DNF

Legend
—	Did not compete
DNF	Did not finish

=== Track ===
2018
UCI World Cup

1st Team pursuit, Minsk
2nd Team pursuit, Milton

National Championships

1st Individual pursuit
2nd Omnium
3rd Team pursuit
