= Jo Tindley =

British cyclist

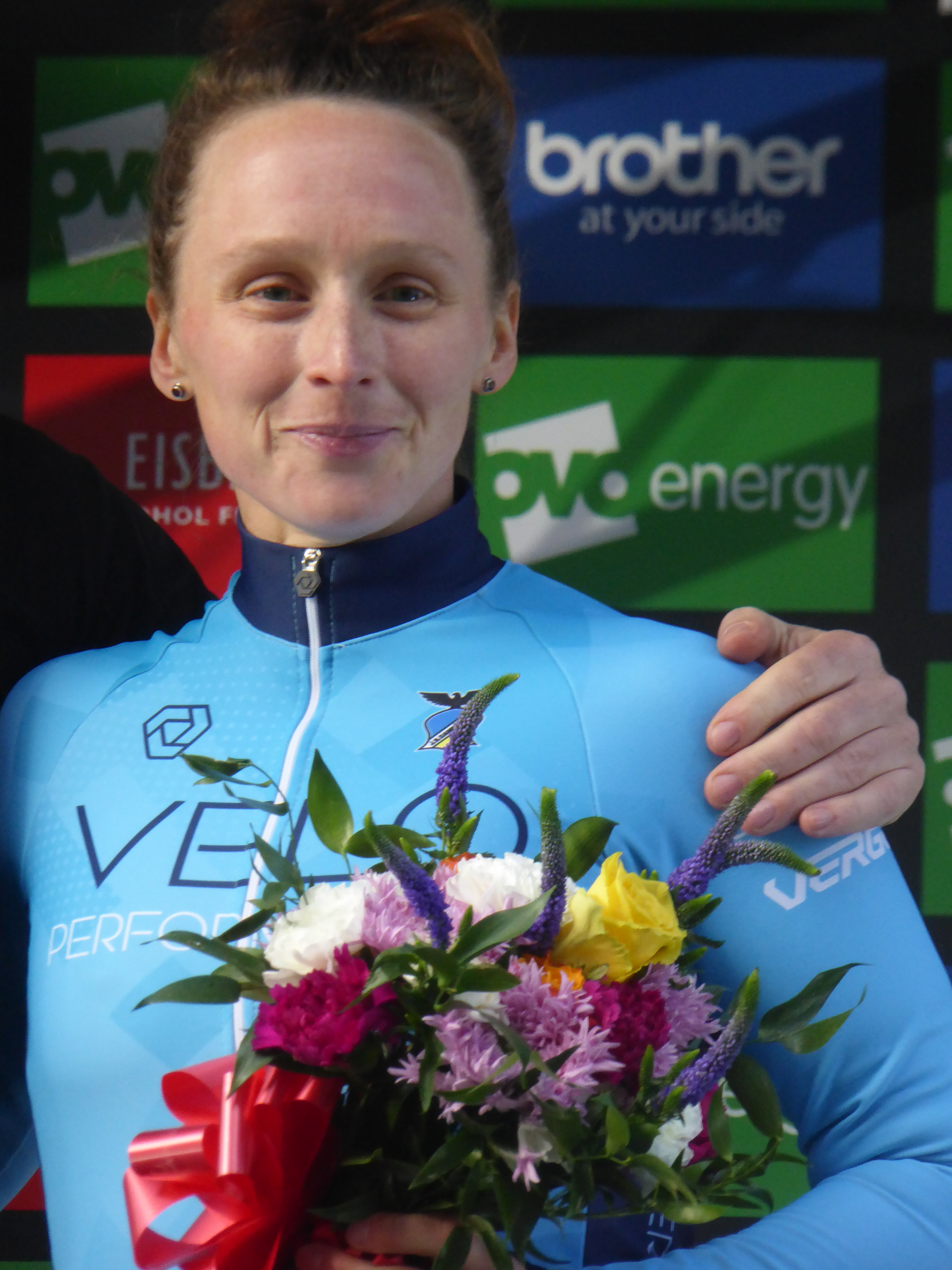
- Tindley in 2019

Personal information
- Full name: Joanna Louise Tindley
- Born: 1 May 1987 (age 39)

Cycling career
- Sport: Cycling
- Current team: Smurfit Westrock Cycling Team
- Discipline: Road
- Role: Rider

Amateur teams
- 2002–2006: VC Londres
- 2007: Bristol Cycling Development Squad
- 2011: Performance Cycles
- 2012: VC St Raphael
- 2013–2014: Matrix Fitness Racing Academy
- 2015: WNT Development Team
- 2016–2017: Team Ford EcoBoost
- 2018: NJC–Biemme–Echelon
- 2019: Campinense–Velo Performance
- 2021–2023: Pro-Noctis–Redchilli Bikes–Heidi Kjeldsen

Professional teams
- 2020–2021: CAMS–Tifosi
- 2024–: Pro-Noctis–200° Coffee–Hargreaves Contracting

Joanna Louise Tindley (born 1 May 1987) is a British racing cyclist, who rides for UCI Women's Continental Team Smurfit Westrock Cycling Team. Tindley was the winner of the sprints classification in the Tour Series in 2021 and 2022, and was the winner of the British National Circuit Race Championships in 2021.
