= Bernard Sulzberger =

Australian cyclist (born 1983)

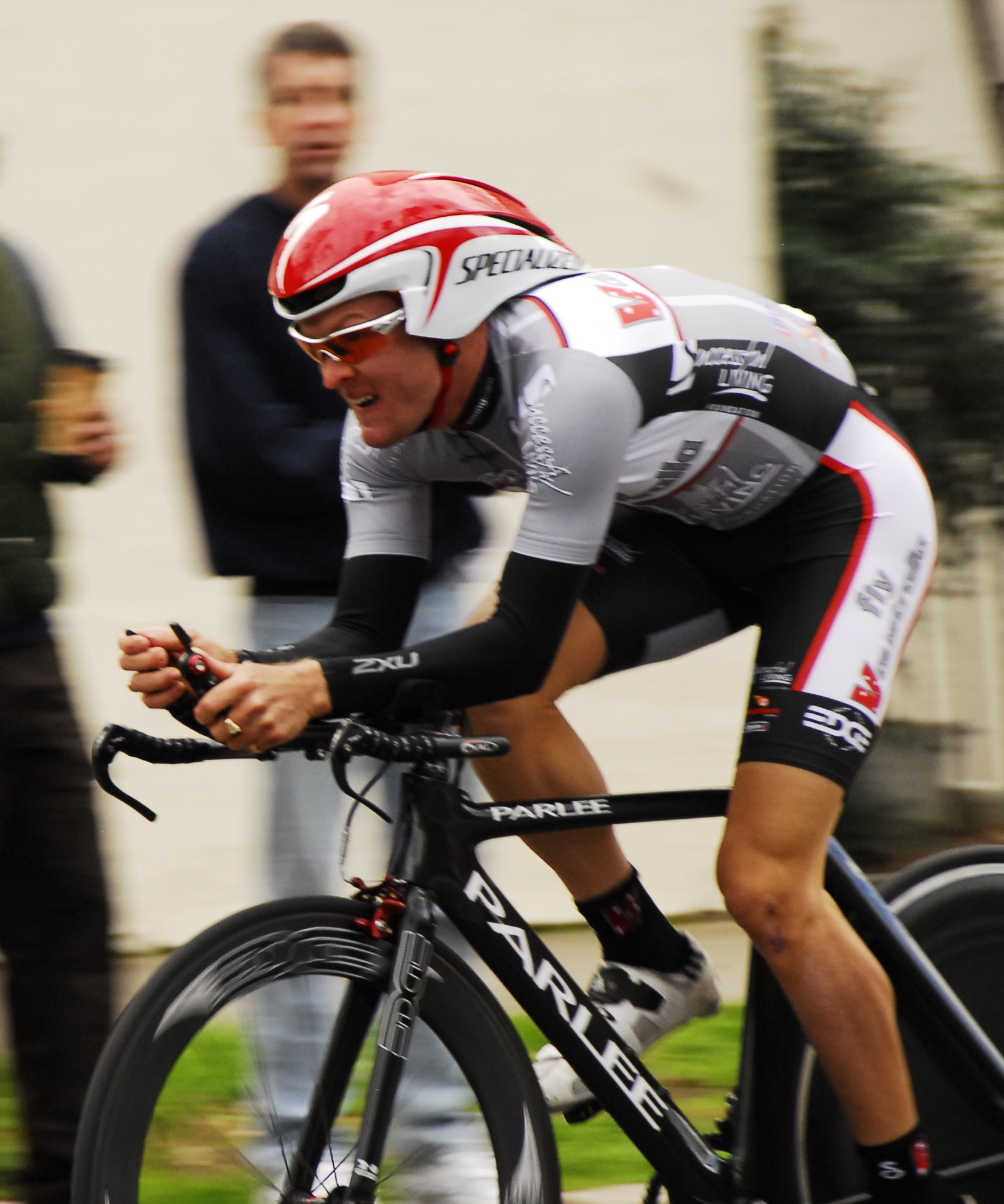

Personal information
- Full name: Bernard Sulzberger
- Born: 5 December 1983 (age 42) Beaconsfield, Tasmania, Australia

Cycling career
- Sport: Cycling
- Current team: Retired
- Discipline: Road
- Role: Rider

Professional teams
- 2006–2007: DFL-Cyclingnews-Litespeed
- 2008: LeTua Cycling Team
- 2009–2011: Fly V Australia
- 2012: Team Raleigh–GAC
- 2013–2016: Drapac Cycling

Major wins
- National Criterium Championships (2008)

Bernard Sulzberger (born 5 December 1983) is an Australian former professional racing cyclist, who rode professionally between 2006 and 2016. He is the older brother of fellow professional racing cyclist Wesley Sulzberger.

== Major results ==
2002
1st Stage 2 Tour of Sunraysia
2005
1st Stage 8 Tour of Tasmania
2nd Overall Tour of the Murray River

1st Stage 2

2007
3rd Overall Tour of Tasmania
2008
1st Criterium, National Road Championships
1st Overall Tour of Gippsland

1st Stage 1

2009
1st Overall Tour of Tasmania

1st Stage 9

1st Overall International Cycling Classic
1st Stage 5 Tour of Utah
1st Stage 4 Geelong Bay Classic Series
1st Stage 6 Tour of Atlanta
1st Stage 6 Tour de Beauce
2010
1st Stage 1 International Cycling Classic
1st Stage 2 Joe Martin Stage Race
2011
1st Stage 3 Jayco Bay Cycling Classic
4th Road race, National Road Championships
2012
1st Round 12, Tour Series, Stoke-on-Trent
2013
1st Overall Tour de Taiwan

1st Points classification

1st Stage 6 Tour of Tasmania
2014
2nd Road race, Oceania Road Championships
3rd Stan Siejka Launceston Cycling Classic
