= Jon Mould =

Welsh road bicycle racer

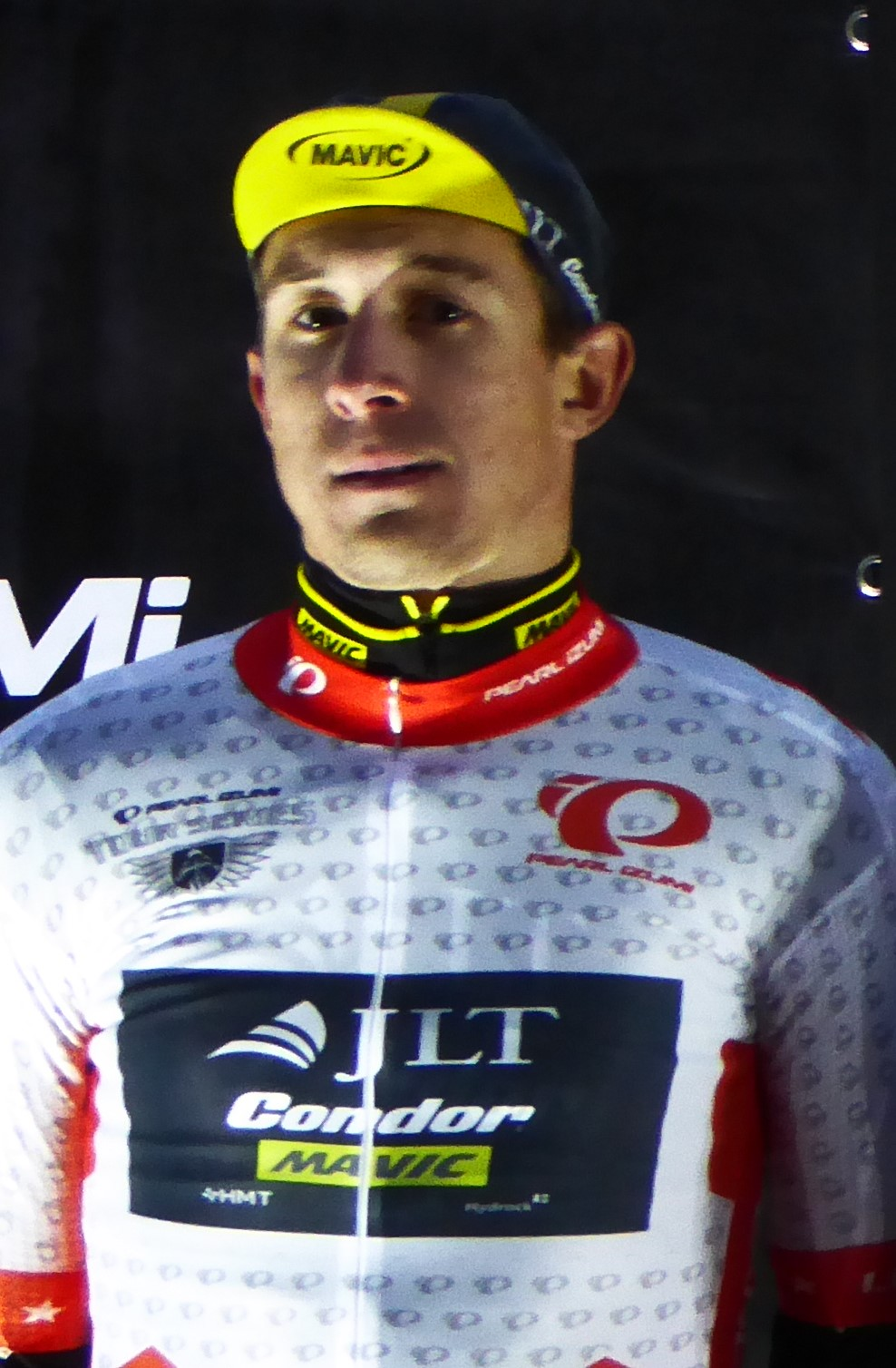
- Mould in 2016.

Personal information
- Full name: Jonathan Mould
- Nicknames: Jon, Mouldy, Doug the Slug
- Born: 4 April 1991 (age 35) Newport, Wales

Cycling career
- Sport: Cycling
- Current team: Tekkerz CC
- Disciplines: Road and track
- Role: Rider
- Rider type: Endurance

Amateur teams
- 2008–2009: Agisko Viner Cycling Team
- 2010–2011: 100% ME
- 2021–: Tekkerz CC

Professional teams
- 2012: An Post–Sean Kelly
- 2013: Team UK Youth
- 2014: NFTO
- 2015: ONE Pro Cycling
- 2016–2018: JLT–Condor
- 2019: Madison Genesis
Medal record
Men's road bicycle racing
Representing Wales
Commonwealth Games
| Silver medal – second place | 2018 Gold Coast | Road race |

Jonathan "Jon" Mould (born 4 April 1991) is a Welsh racing cyclist from Newport. Mould is a member of British Cycling's Olympic Academy Programme which he joined in 2010.

Mould started bike racing at the age of 14 with Newport Velo Cycling Club, and joined the British Cycling Olympic Development Programme in 2009. He was a Commonwealth Games Athlete representing Wales at the Delhi 2010 Games, and rode for the An Post–Sean Kelly team in 2012. He joined Team UK Youth for 2013. After Team UK Youth folded at the end of 2013, he signed with the NFTO team for 2014. After one season with NFTO Mould was announced as part of the inaugural squad for the ONE Pro Cycling team for the 2015 season.

Mould represented Wales at the Commonwealth Games in Glasgow, 2014.

In June 2016 Mould took his fourth Tour Series victory of the season in Durham: the win was also his third consecutive Tour Series win and the ninth of Mould's career, breaking the record of eight wins held by team-mate Ed Clancy.

On 14 April 2018 Mould secured a silver medal for Wales in the Road Race at the 2018 Commonwealth Games held on the Gold Coast, Australia.

== Major results ==
=== Road ===
2009
1st Points classification, Junior Tour of Wales
2010
1st Presidents Road Race
3rd Welsh Criterium Championships
2013
1st Welsh Road Race Championships
1st Welsh Criterium Championships
1st Overall Tour of Jamtland

1st Young rider classification

1st Colchester, Tour Series
1st East Yorkshire Classic
2014
Tour Series

1st Sprints classification
1st Stoke
1st Durham
1st Edinburgh

1st Castle Combe Easter Classic
1st Leicester Castle Classic
2015
1st Overall National Circuit Series

1st Stafford GP
2nd Beverley Grand Prix
3rd Otley Grand Prix

1st Redditch, Tour Series
1st Welsh Criterium Championships
2nd Overall Totnes-Vire Stage Race

1st Stage 1

3rd Stafford Kermesse
2016
Tour Series

1st Motherwell
1st Redditch
1st Aberystwyth
1st Durham
1st Stevenage
1st Croydon

2017
4th Overall New Zealand Cycle Classic

1st Stage 4

2018
1st Grand Prix des Marbriers
2nd Road race, Commonwealth Games

=== Track ===
2008
National Championships

1st Team pursuit
3rd Scratch
3rd Points race

2009
UEC European Junior Championships

1st Madison (with Chris Whorral)
2nd Team pursuit

National Championships

1st Madison (with Mark Christian)
1st Derny (paced by Courtney Rowe)

3rd UIV Cup Ghent (with Luke Rowe)
2010
3rd UIV Cup Copenhagen (with George Atkins)
2011
National Championships

1st Omnium
1st Scratch
2nd Points race
2nd Madison

3rd Points race, UEC European Under-23 Championships
2012
3rd Points race, UCI World Cup Classics, Cali
2013
National Championships

1st Madison (with George Atkins)
1st Omnium

3rd Scratch, UCI World Cup, Manchester
2014
National Championships

2nd Team pursuit
3rd Points race
