= Chris Lawless =

British bicycle racer

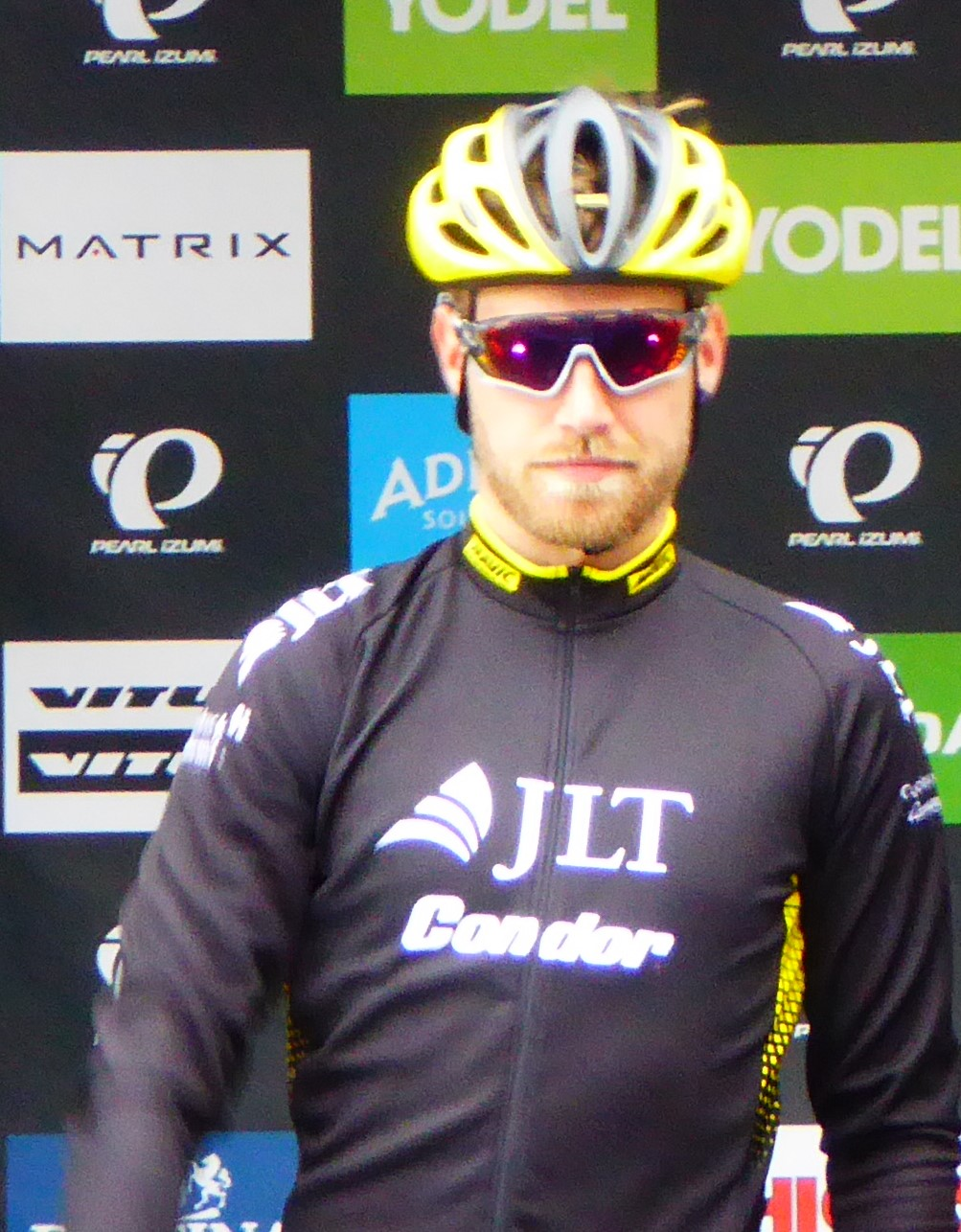
- Lawless in 2016

Personal information
- Full name: Christopher Roscoe Lawless
- Nicknames: The Wigan Wagon Wheel, The Pig-Man
- Born: 4 November 1995 (age 30) Wigan, England
- Height: 1.81 m (5 ft 11 in)
- Weight: 72 kg (159 lb)

Cycling career
- Sport: Cycling
- Current team: Saint Piran
- Discipline: Road
- Role: Rider (retired); Directeur sportif
- Rider type: Sprinter

Amateur team
- 2014: 100% Me

Professional teams
- 2015: WIGGINS
- 2016: JLT–Condor
- 2017: Axeon–Hagens Berman
- 2018–2020: Team Sky
- 2021–2022: Total Direct Énergie
- 2023: AT85 Pro Cycling
- 2023: Lotto–Dstny Development Team

Managerial team
- 2024–: Saint Piran

Major wins
- Stage races Tour de Yorkshire (2019)

Christopher Roscoe Lawless (born 4 November 1995) is a British former cyclist, who competed as a professional from 2015 to 2023. He now works as a directeur sportif for UCI Continental team Saint Piran.

== Career ==
After signing for Team Sky in 2018, Lawless made his debut with the team in the Tour Down Under. He achieved his first victory for the team in March, at the Settimana Internazionale di Coppi e Bartali.

== Major results ==
2013
1st Road race, National Junior Road Championships
1st Points race, National Junior Track Championships
3rd Omnium, National Track Championships
9th Overall Trofeo Karlsberg

1st Points classification
1st Stage 2

2014
1st Team pursuit, National Track Championships
1st Six Days of Ghent Future Stars (with Matt Gibson)
2015
6th Grand Prix Pino Cerami
2016
1st Stage 1 New Zealand Cycle Classic
2nd Road race, National Under-23 Road Championships
3rd Rutland–Melton CiCLE Classic
6th Trofej Umag
10th Beaumont Trophy
2017
National Road Championships

1st Under-23 road race
2nd Road race

1st ZLM Tour
1st Stage 3b Tour de Beauce
1st Stage 4 Tour de l'Avenir
3rd Velothon Wales
6th Overall Le Triptyque des Monts et Châteaux
2018
Settimana Internazionale di Coppi e Bartali

1st Points classification
1st Stages 1b (TTT) & 3

3rd Scheldeprijs
2019
1st Overall Tour de Yorkshire

1st Points classification

3rd Scheldeprijs
4th Overall Tour de Wallonie

1st Young rider classification

2022
2nd Schaal Sels
3rd Clàssica Comunitat Valenciana 1969
4th Grote Prijs Marcel Kint

Criterium

2015
1st Barrow, Tour Series
1st GP of Wales
1st Stockton Festival of Cycling
1st Tickhill
2nd London Nocturne
2016
1st National Criterium Championships
Tour Series

1st Ramsey
1st Stoke-on-Trent

1st London Nocturne
1st Otley Grand Prix
1st Leicester Kermesse Castle Classic
1st Beverley
1st Sheffield
2017
1st Otley Grand Prix
1st Shrewsbury Grand Prix
1st Wales Open
