= Nicola Juniper =

British cyclist

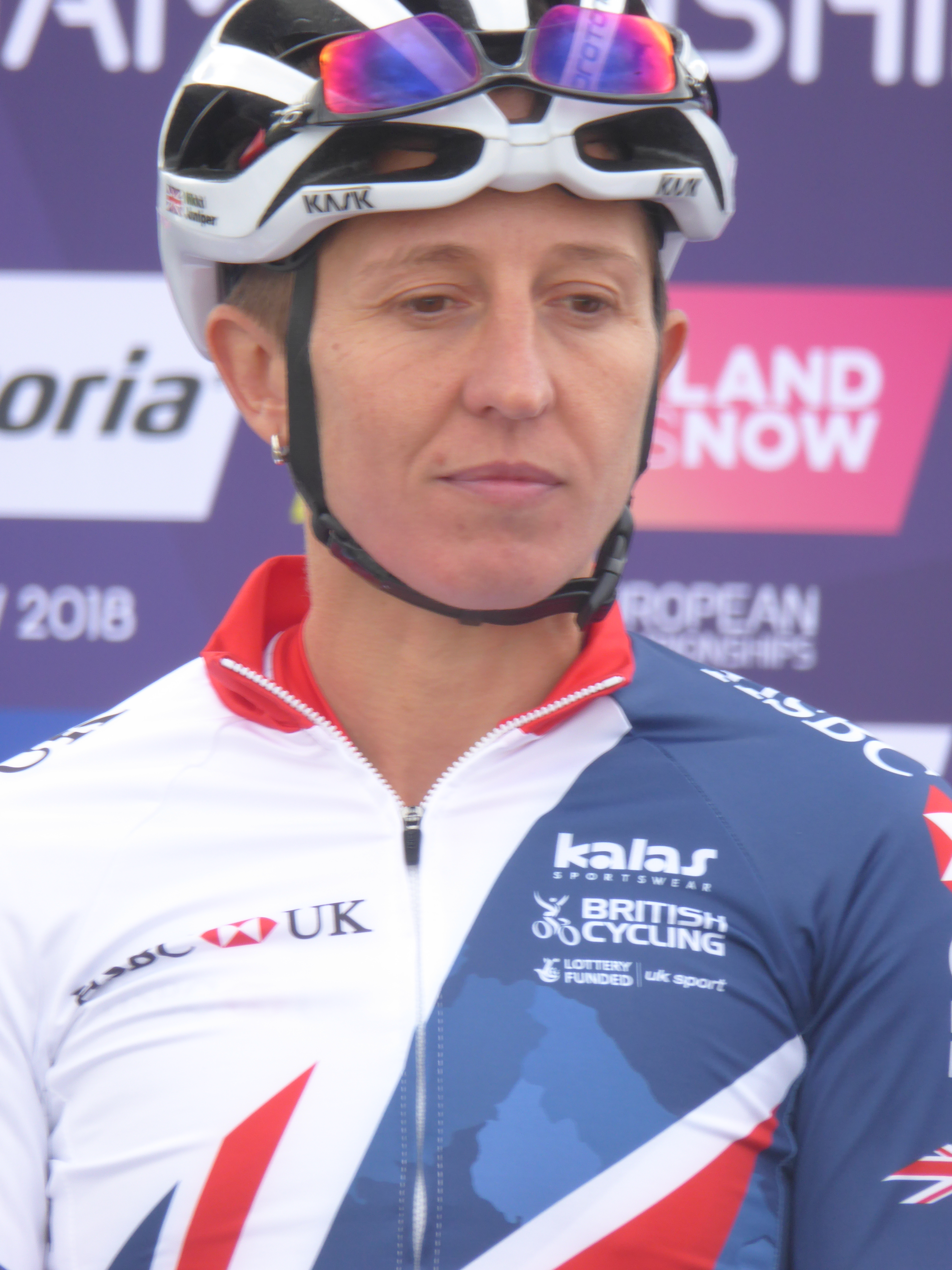
- Juniper in 2018

Personal information
- Full name: Nicola Ann Juniper
- Born: 12 August 1981 (age 45)

Cycling career
- Sport: Cycling
- Discipline: Road
- Role: Rider
- Rider type: Sprinter; Criterium racing

Amateur teams
- 2013: Team CTC
- 2013: Les Filles Racing Team (guest)
- 2014: Madison–Boot Out Breast Cancer Care (guest)
- 2015: Team Giordana Triton
- 2016–2017: Team Ford EcoBoost
- 2018: NJC–Biemme–Echelon
- 2019: MEXX–Watersley International Women's Cycling Team
- 2019–2020: Isorex No Aqua Ladies Team

Managerial teams
- 2018: NJC–Biemme–Echelon
- 2020: Tofauti Everyone Active

Nicola Ann Juniper (born 12 August 1981) is a British racing cyclist, directeur sportif and former team owner. She rode in the women's road race at the 2019 UCI Road World Championships in Yorkshire, England. In 2015, Juniper won the British National Circuit Race Championships in Barnsley.

== Major results ==
2009
6th Smithfield Nocturne
2010
3rd Smithfield Nocturne
2011
7th Smithfield Nocturne
2012
6th London Nocturne
2014
1st London Nocturne
9th RideLondon Grand Prix
2015
1st Criterium, National Road Championships
1st Sprints classification Matrix Fitness GP Series
3rd London Nocturne
7th Overall Rás na mBan
9th Women's Tour de Yorkshire
2016
2nd London Nocturne
3rd Criterium, National Road Championships
8th Women's Tour de Yorkshire
2018
Tour Series

1st Sprints classification
1st Aberdeen
1st Durham
1st Salisbury

2nd Overall Rás na mBan

1st Queen of the Mountains classification
1st Stage 3
