= Michael Northey =

New Zealand track cyclist

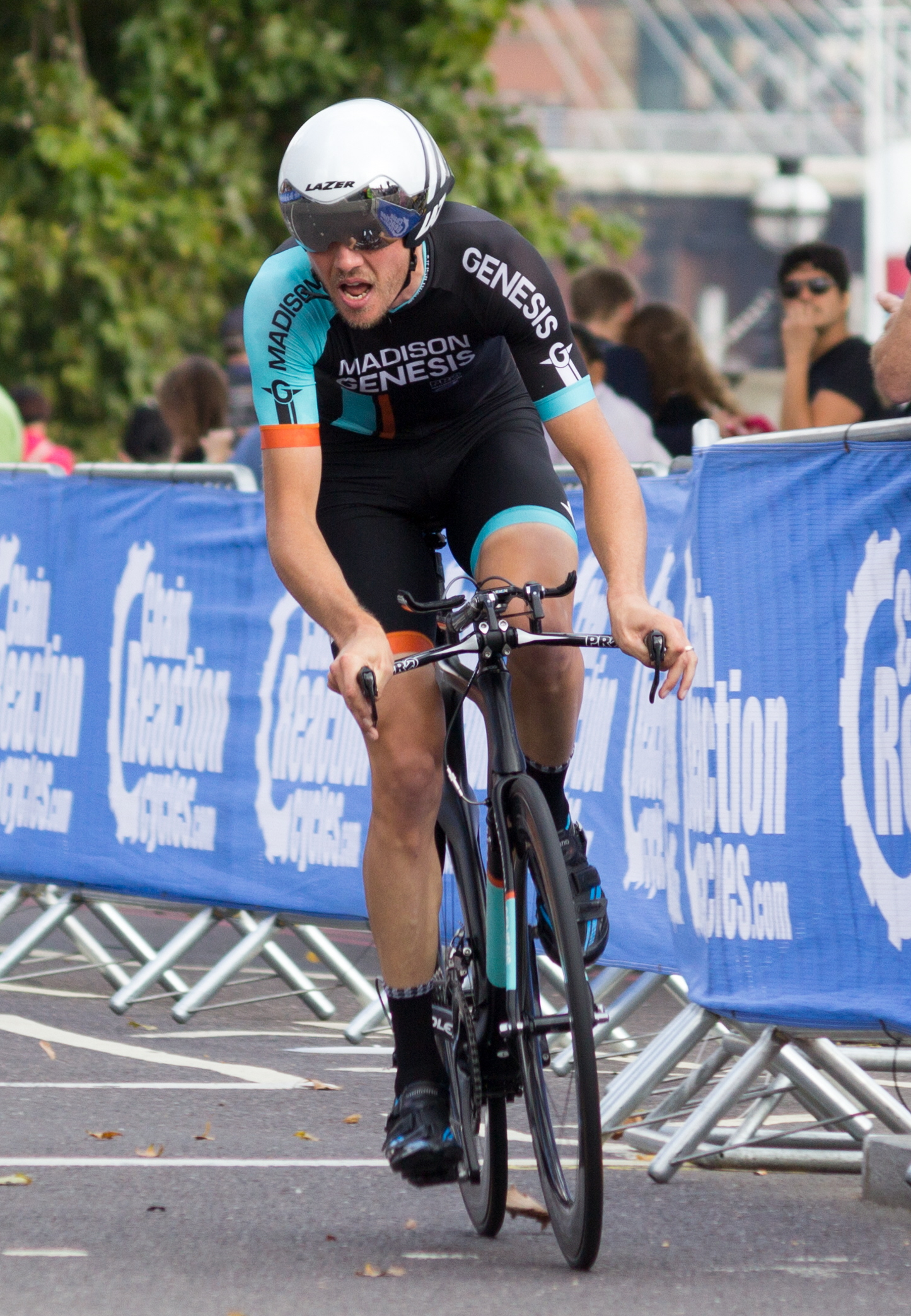

Personal information
- Full name: Michael James Northey
- Born: 24 March 1987 (age 39) Auckland, New Zealand

Cycling career
- Sport: Cycling
- Current team: Retired
- Discipline: Road
- Role: Rider

Amateur team
- 2010: Rubicon-Orbea

Professional teams
- 2009: Land Rover-Orbea
- 2011: PureBlack Racing
- 2012–2013: Node 4–Giordana Racing
- 2014–2016: Madison Genesis

Michael James Northey (born 24 March 1987 in Auckland) is a New Zealand former racing cyclist. He competed for New Zealand at the 2014 Commonwealth Games. In April 2016 Northey announced his retirement from competition due to heart damage he suffered after contracting a virus. After his retirement he remained with his final team Madison Genesis, initially in the role of Assistant Team Manager before being promoted to Team Manager. He left the team in 2017 in order to move back to New Zealand with his family.

== Palmares ==
2010
1st Stage 5 Tour of Southland
2011
1st National Criterium Championships
2012
1st Overall Tour of Southland

1st Stage 2

1st Stage 1 Tour du Loir-et-Cher
2013
1st National Criterium Championships
2014
1st Beverley Grand Prix
2015
1st National Criterium Championships
