= Elizabeth-Jane Harris =

British cyclist

EJ Harris
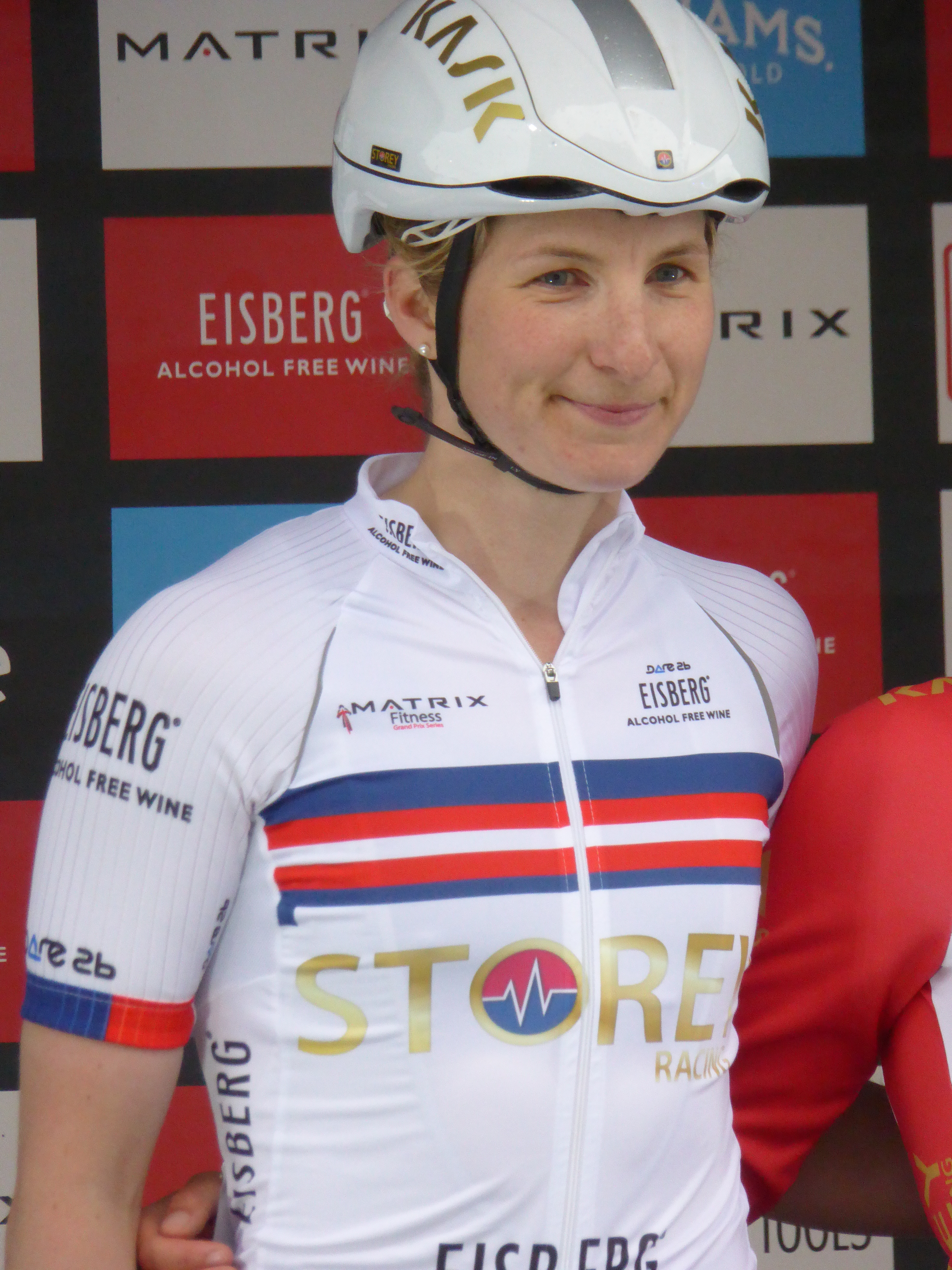
- Harris in 2017.

Personal information
- Full name: Elizabeth-Jane Harris
- Born: 7 January 1988 (age 38)

Cycling career
- Sport: Cycling
- Current team: Storey Racing
- Discipline: Road
- Role: Rider

Amateur teams
- 2014–2015: Army Cycling Union
- 2017–: Storey Racing

Professional team
- 2016: Podium Ambition Pro Cycling

Elizabeth-Jane Harris (born 7 January 1988) is a British professional racing cyclist who rides for Storey Racing. At the 2017 Matrix Grand Prix series Harris won round 5 in Croydon and took the Eisberg Sprints Jersey.

== See also ==
- List of 2016 UCI Women's Teams and riders
