= Vitus Pro Cycling Team p/b Brother UK =

British cycling team

Team information
- UCI code: VIT
- Registered: United Kingdom
- Founded: 2010
- Discipline: Road
- Status: UCI Continental
- Bicycles: Vitus

Key personnel
- General manager: Cherie Pridham

Team name history
- 2010–2011 2012–2013 2013–2014 2015–2017 2018 2019–2020: Team Raleigh; Team Raleigh–GAC; Team Raleigh; Team Raleigh–GAC; Vitus Pro Cycling Team; Vitus Pro Cycling Team p/b Brother UK

Vitus Pro Cycling Team p/b Brother UK (UCI team code: VIT) was a British UCI Continental cycling team. From 2010 to 2017, the team was sponsored by the Raleigh Bicycle Company, before Vitus took over the naming rights in 2018.

== Team history ==
Founded in 2010 Team Raleigh–GAC's primary sponsor was the Raleigh Bicycle Company who supplied the team's bicycles. The team was also sponsored by a roster of additional sponsors including GAC Logistics, Škoda Auto, Don Amott and iPro. The team competed in senior professional events in the United Kingdom and Europe, other than the Grand Tours and UCI ProTour races. For the 2011 season they expanded the team to 12 riders, and in 2013 they expanded again to 14 riders. In December 2013 it was announced that Bernard Hinault would work with the team in a "patron" role for the 2014 season.

After the team's initial season with sponsorship by Vitus in 2018, in 2019 the team added Brother UK as a co-sponsor, with the team's official name becoming "Vitus Pro Cycling Team, Powered By Brother UK".

== Team roster ==
As of 27 May 2020.

Rider	Date of birth
Stephen Bradbury (GBR)	19 October 1993 (age 32)
Adam Kenway (GBR)	8 July 1987 (age 39)
Christopher Latham (GBR)	6 February 1994 (age 32)
Tom Mazzone (GBR)	9 July 1993 (age 33)
Chris McGlinchey (IRL)	31 March 1994 (age 32)
Darnell Moore (IRL)	27 August 1996 (age 30)

Rider	Date of birth
Mikey Mottram (GBR)	8 June 1990 (age 36)
Joe Nally (GBR)	13 July 1999 (age 27)
Freddie Scheske (GER)	19 September 1995 (age 30)
Joe Sutton (GBR)	26 September 1997 (age 28)
Dan Tulett (GBR)	3 July 1999 (age 27)
Joey Walker (GBR)	15 September 1997 (age 28)

== Major wins ==
2012
Stage 6 Vuelta Mexico, Daniel Holloway
Tour Series sprints jersey winner, Bernard Sulzberger
Tour Series Round 6 (Peterborough) Team win
Tour Series Round 9 stage win, Graham Briggs (Colchester)
Tour Series Round 10 stage win, Bernard Sulzberger (Stoke-on-Trent)
2013
Prologue Tour de Normandie, Tom Scully
Stage 3 Tour de Normandie, Alexandre Blain
Overall Tour of the Reservoir, Evan Oliphant

Stage 2, Evan Oliphant

Pearl Izumi Tour Series

Round 1 (Kirkcaldy), Team win
Round 2 (Durham), Team win
Round 7 (Redditch), 1st, Tom Scully
Round 12 (Ipswich), 1st, Tom Scully

IG Markets London Nocturne, Tom Scully
Stafford Grand Prix, Tom Scully
2014
Gouesnou Cyclo-cross, Matthieu Boulo
Eddie Soens Memorial Race, Ian Wilkinson
Severn Bridge Road Race, Alexandre Blain
Evesham Vale Road Race, Yanto Barker
Stage 2 Tour of the Reservoir, Evan Oliphant
Lincoln Grand Prix, Yanto Barker
Scottish Road Race Championship, Evan Oliphant
Tour Series Round 7 (Redditch), Matthieu Boulo
Elite Circuit Series (Stockton Festival of Cycling), George Atkins
Overall Elite Circuit Series, George Atkins
Stafford Kermesse, Morgan Kneisky
Grenchen Track championships (Madison), Morgan Kneisky
Overall Premier Calendar Road Series, Yanto Barker
UCI Track World Cup – London (Team pursuit), Mark Christian
UCI Track World Cup – London (Madison), Mark Christian
2015
Wally Gimber RR, Karol Domagalski
Crit on the Campus Stirling, Evan Oliphant

== World champions ==
2014
World Track championships (Madison), Morgan Kneisky
