= Saint Piran (cycling team) =

British cycling team

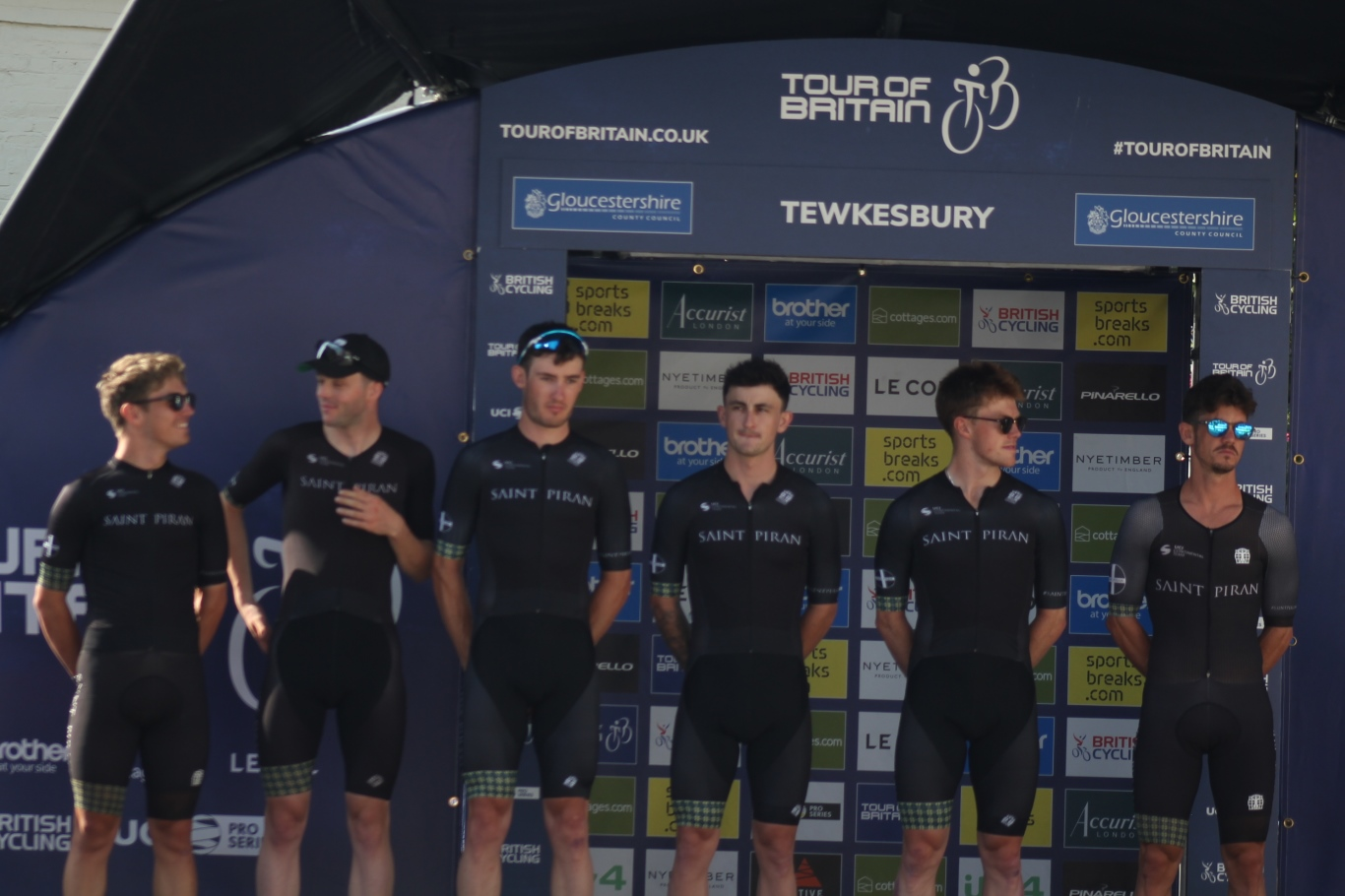

Team information
- UCI code: SPC
- Registered: Cornwall, England
- Founded: 2018; 8 years ago
- Discipline: Road
- Status: Elite National (2018–2020); UCI Continental (2021–2024)
- Bicycles: Colnago (2018–2020); Lapierre Bikes (2021–2022); Unknown (2022-2024)
- Website: Team home page

Key personnel
- General manager: Richard Pascoe
- Team manager: Richard Pascoe

Team name history
- 2018 – 2024: Saint Piran

Saint Piran Pro Cycling Team was a British UCI Continental cycling team based in the region of Cornwall in southwest England. It was founded in 2018 with the intent of developing Cornish cycling talent and getting an invitation to the Tour de France within five years as a UCI ProTeam. After three years as an Elite National team, the team moved up to the UCI Continental level in 2021.

The team's name was taken from the Cornish abbot Saint Piran. The team's jersey drew inspiration from the Cornish flag and the Cornish tartan, and was unusual in featuring no sponsors. Alongside its UCI Continental team, Saint Piran also maintained a women's team.

At the end of the 2024 season a controversy emerged around the unbranded bikes used by the team. While the frames were not UCI approved, the team had applied fake UCI approval stickers On 25 November 2024 the team announced that neither their Men's Continental, nor Women's Elite Development Teams would be continuing, citing difficulties in obtaining sponsorship due to turbulent media coverage

== Team roster ==
As of 12 August 2023.

Rider	Date of birth
Harry Birchill (GBR)	1 January 2001 (age 25)
Rhys Britton (GBR)	13 May 1999 (age 27)
Josh Charlton (GBR)	10 February 2003 (age 23)
Finn Crockett (Note: Joined on 28 June) (GBR)	30 June 1999 (age 27)
Tyler Hannay (Note: Joined on 11 July) (GBR)	3 September 2003 (age 23)
Lucas Jowett (GBR)	24 November 2004 (age 21)
Zeb Kyffin (GBR)	23 February 1998 (age 28)
Adam Lewis (GBR)	21 August 1995 (age 31)
Leon Mazzone (GBR)	13 December 1996 (age 29)

Rider	Date of birth
Tom Mazzone (GBR)	9 July 1993 (age 33)
Alexandar Richardson (GBR)	30 April 1990 (age 36)
William Roberts (GBR)	4 June 1998 (age 28)
Jack Rootkin-Gray (GBR)	5 November 2002 (age 23)
Evan Russell (Note: Left on 5 June) (CAN)	24 May 2001 (age 25)
Cooper Sayers (AUS)	25 February 1999 (age 27)
Bradley Symonds (GBR)	20 August 1997 (age 29)
Charlie Tanfield (GBR)	17 November 1996 (age 29)
William Tidball (GBR)	22 April 2000 (age 26)

== Major wins ==
2019
Points classification Tour Series, Steven Lampier
2021
Grand Prix de la Somme, Tom Mazzone
2022
Grand Prix de la ville de Nogent-sur-Oise, Alexandar Richardson
2023
Ringerike GP, Jack Rootkin-Gray
Lincoln GP, Alexandar Richardson (1st), Zeb Kyffin (2nd), Jack Rootkin-Gray (3rd)
2024
Stage 4 Tour of Japan, Joshua Ludman
