= Giordana Racing Team =

Velosure Giordana Procycling Team

Team information
- UCI code: VGR
- Registered: United Kingdom
- Founded: 2008
- Discipline: Road
- Status: UCI Continental
- Bicycles: Pinarello
- Website: Team home page

Key personnel
- Team managers: Phil Griffiths; Malcolm Elliott; Bill Nickson

Team name history
- 2009 2010 2011 2012–2013 2014-: CandiTV-Marshalls Pasta; Motorpoint-Marshalls Pasta; Motorpoint Pro-Cycling Team; Node4 Giordana Pro Cycling Team; Giordana Racing Team
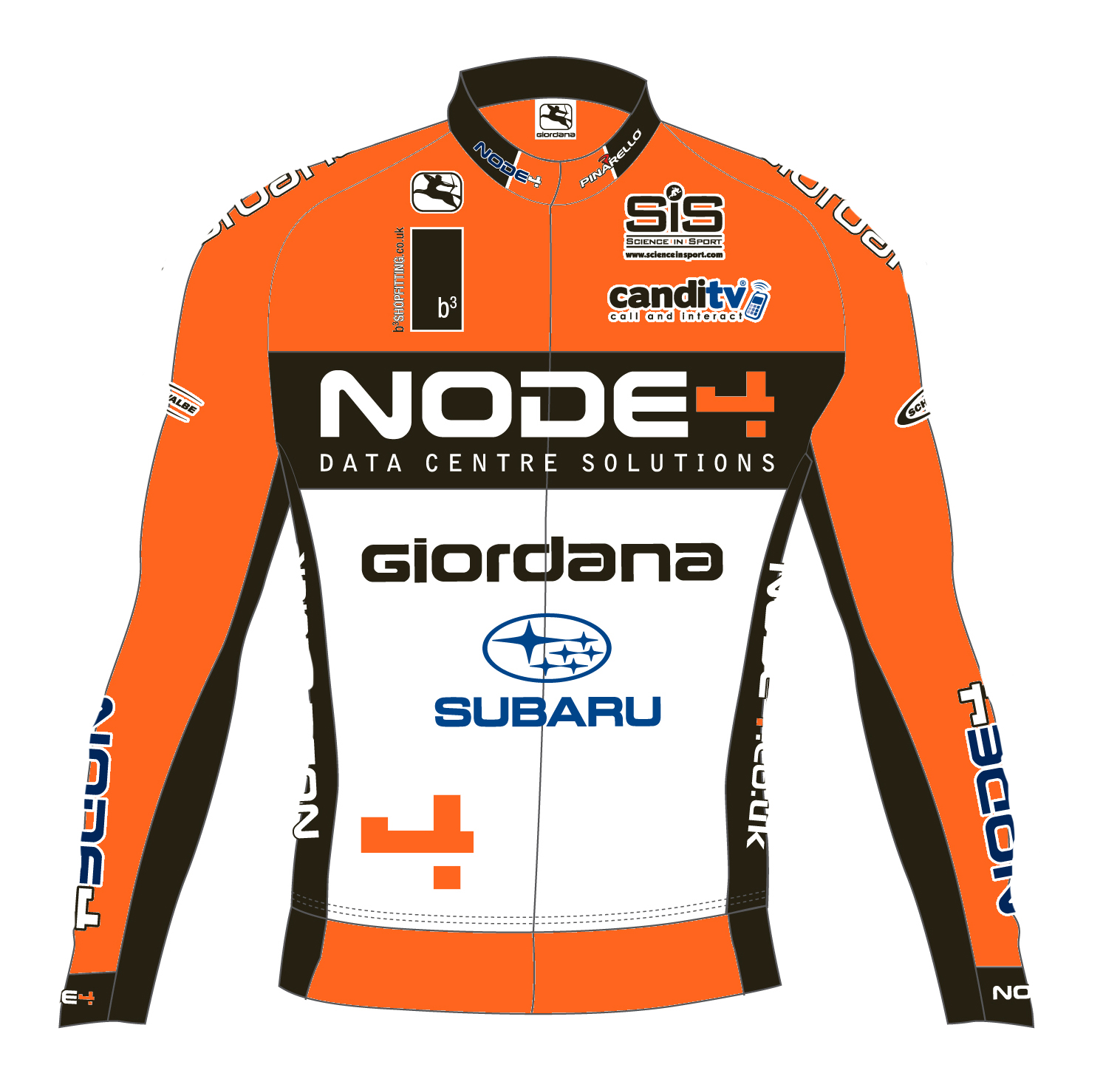
Giordana Racing Team jersey
Jersey

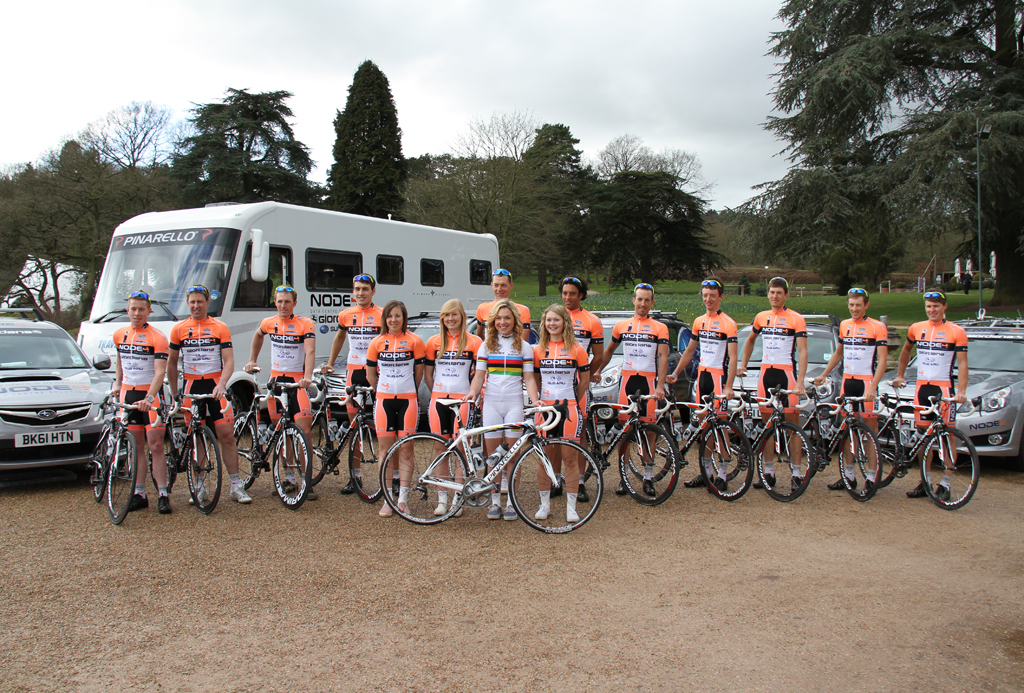
Team riders in 2012

The Velosure Giordana Pro Cycling Team (UCI team code: VGR) are a British UCI Continental cycling team.

== Profile ==
The Velosure Giordana cycling team are sponsored by Node4, a Data Centre Services provider. The team rides senior professional events in the United Kingdom and Europe, other than the Grand Tours and UCI ProTour races. They also ride track events such as the Revolution.

In 2012 the team changed its name from Motorpoint to Node4-Giordana. In 2014 It became Velosure Giordana

== Major wins ==
2008
Stage 2, 3 & 4 Cinturón a Mallorca, Russell Downing
Abergavenny Criterium, Russell Downing
GP of Wales, Russell Downing
Stage 4 Tour of Ireland, Russell Downing
2009
Stage 3 Cinturón a Mallorca, Russell Downing
Overall Tour of Ireland, Russell Downing

Stage 1, Russell Downing

2010
Stage 1 Cinturón a Mallorca, Ian Bibby
2011
Stage 3 Cinturón a Mallorca, Ian Bibby
Stage 6 An Post Rás, Marcin Białobłocki
2012
Overall BDO Tour of Northland, Michael Northey

Stages 1, 3 & 4, Michael Northey

Overall Irish Sea Tour of the North, James Moss
Stage 1 Tour du Loir-et-Cher, Michael Northey
Shay Elliott Memorial Race, Philip Lavery
Stage 1 An Post Rás, Marcin Białobłocki
Stage 3 Tour of Ulster, Matthew Higgins
Torquay Critrerium, Marcin Białobłocki
Guildford Criterium, James Moss
GP Ville de Pérenchies, Rico Rogers
Newport Criterium, Rico Dene Rogers
Ottershaw Series, David Clarke
Overall Tour of Southland, Michael Northey

Stage 2, Michael Northey

Lake Taupo Cycle Challenge, Michael Northey
Waipara Festival of Cycling, Matt Cronshaw
2013
Rev Classic Cambridge, Shem Rodger
Overall BDO Tour of Northland, Michael Northey

Stages 2 & 4, Michael Northey

Stage 3 Totnes–Vire Stage Race, James Williamson
Wales Open Criterium, Michael James Northey
Grand Prix of Wales, Michael Northey
Sefton Classic, Daniel Barry
New Zealand National Criterium Championship, Michael Northey
2014
Jock Wadley Memorial RR, Robert Partridge
Coalville Wheelers, Steven Lampier
Overall Irish Sea Tour of the North, James Gullen
Wiltshire GP, Marcin Białobłocki
Stage 5 An Post Rás, Marcin Białobłocki

== 2013 team ==
As of 15 January 2013.

Rider	Date of birth
Daniel Barry (NZL)	29 January 1988 (age 38)
Lee Davis (GBR)	18 June 1970 (age 56)
Nathan Edmondson (GBR)	3 February 1990 (age 36)
Richard Hepworth (GBR)	25 February 1987 (age 39)
Steven Lampier (GBR)	2 March 1984 (age 42)
Andrew Magnier (GBR)	6 July 1988 (age 38)

Rider	Date of birth
Michael Northey (NZL)	24 March 1987 (age 39)
Shem Rodger (NZL)	4 December 1988 (age 37)
Roman Van Uden (NZL)	29 October 1988 (age 37)
Christian Varley (GBR)	21 June 1984 (age 42)
James Williamson (NZL)	27 March 1989 (age 37)
