= 2011 Tour of Britain =

UCI Europe Tour
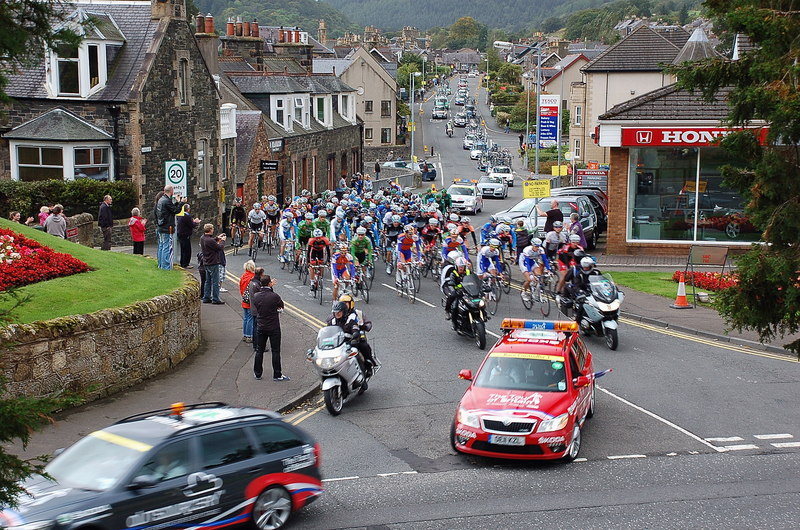
- The race departing from Peebles

Race details
- Dates: 11–18 September 2011
- Stages: 8 (Note: The Tour of Britain was reduced from 9 stages over 1,254.5 kilometres (779.5 mi) due to the cancellation of Stage 2.)
- Distance: 1,116.8 km (693.9 mi)
- Winning time: 26h 57' 35"

Results
Jersey awarded to the overall winner	Winner	Lars Boom (Netherlands)	(Rabobank)
	Second	Steve Cummings (Great Britain)	(Team Sky)
	Third	Jan Bárta (Czech Republic)	(Team NetApp)
Jersey awarded to the points classification winner	Points	Geraint Thomas (Great Britain)	(Team Sky)
Jersey awarded to the mountains classification winner	Mountains	Jonathan Tiernan-Locke (Great Britain)	(Rapha Condor–Sharp)
Jersey awarded to the sprints classification winner	Sprints	Pieter Ghyllebert (Belgium)	(An Post–Sean Kelly)
	Team	Team Sky	

The 2011 Tour of Britain was the eighth running of the latest incarnation of the Tour of Britain and the 72nd British tour in total. The race started on 11 September in Peebles, Scotland and finished on 18 September in London, England, with the race also visiting Wales for one stage.

The race consisted of eight stages – down from the original itinerary of nine stages due to bad weather – and included the Tour's first individual time trial since 2007, as part of two stages on the race's final day, with a criterium to finish the race. The race was held as part of the 2010–2011 UCI Europe Tour, and was categorised by the UCI as a 2.1 category race.

The race was won by Rabobank rider Lars Boom, who claimed the leader's gold jersey after two stage victories, as well as a strong finish on the individual time trial stage. Boom maintained his advantage to the end of the race, with a winning margin over runner-up Team Sky's Steve Cummings of 36 seconds, and Team NetApp's Jan Bárta completed the podium, 19 seconds behind Cummings and 55 seconds down on Boom.

In the race's other classifications, Team Sky's Geraint Thomas won the points classification, An Post–Sean Kelly rider Pieter Ghyllebert led the sprints classification from start to finish and Jonathan Tiernan-Locke took home the polka-dot jersey for Rapha Condor–Sharp, as he finished at the top of the mountains classification. As well as Thomas' points victory, Team Sky finished on top of the teams classification.

== Participating teams ==
UCI ProTeams

- GRM – Garmin–Cervélo
- THR – HTC–Highroad
- LEO – Leopard Trek
- RAB – Rabobank
- SKY – Team Sky
- VCD – Vacansoleil–DCM

UCI Professional Continental teams

- APP – Team NetApp
- EUC – Team Europcar
- TSV – Topsport Vlaanderen–Mercator
- UHC – UnitedHealthcare

UCI Continental teams

- EDR – Endura Racing
- MPT – Motorpoint Pro–Cycling Team
- RAL – Team Raleigh
- RCS – Rapha Condor–Sharp
- SGS – Sigma Sport–Specialized
- SKT – An Post–Sean Kelly

== Stages ==
=== Stage 1 ===
11 September 2011 – Peebles to Dumfries, 170.3 km (105.8 mi)

A pair of riders – An Post–Sean Kelly's Pieter Ghyllebert and Sigma Sport–Specialized's Russell Hampton – made the early breakaway from the field, locking out the top two placings at each of the three intermediate sprint points and the three categorised climbs during the stage. Ghyllebert finished first at the sprints, and thus took the race's first sprints jersey, while Hampton earned the polka-dot jersey for heading the mountains classification, and also earned the award for the day's most combative rider. The breakaway, which had an advantage of six minutes over the field at one point during the stage, was caught with around 10 km (6.2 mi) remaining, which would ultimately set up a sprint finish in Dumfries.

HTC–Highroad, Rabobank and Team Sky moved their riders towards the front of the field, to win the sprint for the line and the ten-second time bonus available for the first rider to complete the stage. As it was, HTC–Highroad were the strongest in the closing stages and Mark Renshaw led Mark Cavendish – only racing in the Tour with special dispensation from the Union Cycliste Internationale after his stage 4 exit from the Vuelta a España – out to claim the stage victory, his first in the race since 2007. The stage victory gave Cavendish the lead in the general classification, and also the points classification, from points gained at the finish. Renshaw finished just behind Cavendish, with Rabobank's Theo Bos completing the top three placings.

Stage 1 Result

	Rider	Team	Time
1	Mark Cavendish (GBR)	HTC–Highroad	4h 41' 06"
2	Mark Renshaw (AUS)	HTC–Highroad	s.t.
3	Theo Bos (NED)	Rabobank	s.t.
4	Barry Markus (NED)	Vacansoleil–DCM	s.t.
5	Geraint Thomas (GBR)	Team Sky	s.t.
6	Robert Förster (GER)	UnitedHealthcare	s.t.
7	Ben Swift (GBR)	Team Sky	s.t.
8	Lars Boom (NED)	Rabobank	s.t.
9	Roger Hammond (GBR)	Garmin–Cervélo	s.t.
10	Ian Wilkinson (GBR)	Endura Racing	s.t.

General Classification after Stage 1

	Rider	Team	Time
1	Mark Cavendish (GBR)	HTC–Highroad	4h 40' 56"
2	Mark Renshaw (AUS)	HTC–Highroad	+ 4"
3	Theo Bos (NED)	Rabobank	+ 6"
4	Lars Boom (NED)	Rabobank	+ 9"
5	Mathew Hayman (AUS)	Team Sky	+ 9"
6	Peter Williams (GBR)	Motorpoint Pro–Cycling Team	+ 9"
7	Barry Markus (NED)	Vacansoleil–DCM	+ 10"
8	Geraint Thomas (GBR)	Team Sky	+ 10"
9	Robert Förster (GER)	UnitedHealthcare	+ 10"
10	Ben Swift (GBR)	Team Sky	+ 10"

=== Stage 2 ===
12 September 2011 – Kendal to Blackpool, 137.7 km (85.6 mi)

Prior to the start of the stage, race organisers cancelled the stage on police advice due to high winds in Northern England, as Hurricane Katia, now a post-tropical cyclone hit the country.

Remained the General Classification after Stage 2

	Rider	Team	Time
1	Mark Cavendish (GBR)	HTC–Highroad	4h 40' 56"
2	Mark Renshaw (AUS)	HTC–Highroad	+ 4"
3	Theo Bos (NED)	Rabobank	+ 6"
4	Lars Boom (NED)	Rabobank	+ 9"
5	Mathew Hayman (AUS)	Team Sky	+ 9"
6	Peter Williams (GBR)	Motorpoint Pro–Cycling Team	+ 9"
7	Barry Markus (NED)	Vacansoleil–DCM	+ 10"
8	Geraint Thomas (GBR)	Team Sky	+ 10"
9	Robert Förster (GER)	UnitedHealthcare	+ 10"
10	Ben Swift (GBR)	Team Sky	+ 10"

=== Stage 3 ===
13 September 2011 – Stoke-on-Trent to Stoke-on-Trent, 140 km (87.0 mi)

Although not as prominent as the previous day, windy conditions caused problems for the riders during the stage, with the field being split into several groups, behind a trio of breakaway riders. UnitedHealthcare's Boy Van Poppel, An Post–Sean Kelly's Andrew Fenn, and the mountains classification leader Russell Hampton of Sigma Sport–Specialized formed the day's breakaway, and they accelerated away from the field to a maximum advantage of over three minutes. The lead trio also took the maximum points from the first two intermediate sprints and the second category climb at Ramshorn. They stayed ahead of the field – and were later joined by Rapha Condor–Sharp rider Jonathan Tiernan-Locke – until just after Gun Hill, where Team Sky, HTC–Highroad and Rabobank advanced some of their riders into an echelon of 27 riders. After advancing all six of their riders into the echelon, Team Sky sent one of their riders on the attack with around 15 km (9.3 mi) remaining on the stage.

The newly crowned British time trial champion Alex Dowsett attempted to take a solo victory for the second time in a few weeks, after a similar performance at the Tour du Poitou-Charentes a couple weeks prior to the Tour of Britain. Dowsett was caught within the final 2 km (1.2 mi) of the stage, which allowed several teams to launch mini-attacks on their rivals, in an attempt to break them. Ultimately, it was the Rabobank duo Michael Matthews and Lars Boom that set up the sprint akin to the sprint that Mark Renshaw and Mark Cavendish accomplished for HTC–Highroad in Dumfries in Stage 1. Boom won the stage ahead of Matthews, with Geraint Thomas best of the rest in third for Team Sky, ahead of team-mate Steve Cummings and Cavendish. Boom's win – coupled with bonus seconds on the finish and intermediate sprints – enabled him to take the general classification lead from Cavendish by three seconds.

Stage 3 Result

	Rider	Team	Time
1	Lars Boom (NED)	Rabobank	3h 23' 42"
2	Michael Matthews (AUS)	Rabobank	s.t.
3	Geraint Thomas (GBR)	Team Sky	s.t.
4	Steve Cummings (GBR)	Team Sky	s.t.
5	Mark Cavendish (GBR)	HTC–Highroad	s.t.
6	Ian Bibby (GBR)	Motorpoint Pro–Cycling Team	s.t.
7	Jonathan Tiernan-Locke (GBR)	Rapha Condor–Sharp	s.t.
8	Jelle Wallays (BEL)	Topsport Vlaanderen–Mercator	s.t.
9	Linus Gerdemann (GER)	Leopard Trek	s.t.
10	Andrew Fenn (GBR)	An Post–Sean Kelly	s.t.

General Classification after Stage 3

	Rider	Team	Time
1	Lars Boom (NED)	Rabobank	8h 04' 35"
2	Mark Cavendish (GBR)	HTC–Highroad	+ 3"
3	Geraint Thomas (GBR)	Team Sky	+ 6"
4	Michael Matthews (AUS)	Rabobank	+ 7"
5	Boy Van Poppel (NED)	UnitedHealthcare	+ 8"
6	Andrew Fenn (GBR)	An Post–Sean Kelly	+ 8"
7	Ian Bibby (GBR)	Motorpoint Pro–Cycling Team	+ 13"
8	Linus Gerdemann (GER)	Leopard Trek	+ 13"
9	Steve Cummings (GBR)	Team Sky	+ 13"
10	Daniel Lloyd (GBR)	Garmin–Cervélo	+ 13"

=== Stage 4 ===
14 September 2011 – Welshpool to Caerphilly, 183.7 km (114.1 mi)

Just like the previous day's stage, a trio of riders went away from the field to form the day's breakaway. Rapha Condor–Sharp's Kristian House, Endura Racing's Jack Bauer, and the sprints classification leader Pieter Ghyllebert of An Post–Sean Kelly formed the breakaway, and they accelerated away from the field to a maximum advantage of almost six minutes. The lead trio also took the maximum points from all three intermediate sprints – a result that boosted Ghyllebert's lead in the sprints classification – and the first two categorised climbs of the day, at Llyswen Hill and over the first category climb at the Brecon Beacons.

The field steadily brought back the breakaway, and by the foot of the final climb of the day coming at Caerphilly mountain with just 5 km (3.1 mi) remaining, the field was all back together again. The climb split the field apart so much so, that only 22 riders were in contention of winning the stage at Caerphilly Castle. The world road race champion, Thor Hushovd, was set up for the sprint by Garmin–Cervélo team-mate Julian Dean, and proceeded to take the stage victory. Lars Boom, the race leader, finished behind Hushovd, and ahead of Cesare Benedetti, Ian Bibby and Boy Van Poppel. Boom extended his lead in the general classification, thanks to his time bonus of six seconds on the finish line, and also assumed the lead of the points classification from Mark Cavendish.

Stage 4 Result

	Rider	Team	Time
1	Thor Hushovd (NOR)	Garmin–Cervélo	4h 32' 22"
2	Lars Boom (NED)	Rabobank	s.t.
3	Cesare Benedetti (ITA)	Team NetApp	s.t.
4	Ian Bibby (GBR)	Motorpoint Pro–Cycling Team	s.t.
5	Boy Van Poppel (NED)	UnitedHealthcare	s.t.
6	Jan Bárta (CZE)	Team NetApp	s.t.
7	Stijn Neirynck (BEL)	Topsport Vlaanderen–Mercator	s.t.
8	Leopold König (CZE)	Team NetApp	s.t.
9	Iker Camaño (ESP)	Endura Racing	s.t.
10	Linus Gerdemann (GER)	Leopard Trek	s.t.

General Classification after Stage 4

	Rider	Team	Time
1	Lars Boom (NED)	Rabobank	12h 36' 51"
2	Geraint Thomas (GBR)	Team Sky	+ 12"
3	Boy Van Poppel (NED)	UnitedHealthcare	+ 14"
4	Ian Bibby (GBR)	Motorpoint Pro–Cycling Team	+ 19"
5	Linus Gerdemann (GER)	Leopard Trek	+ 19"
6	Daniel Lloyd (GBR)	Garmin–Cervélo	+ 19"
7	Steve Cummings (GBR)	Team Sky	+ 19"
8	Bert-Jan Lindeman (NED)	Vacansoleil–DCM	+ 19"
9	Jan Bárta (CZE)	Team NetApp	+ 19"
10	Jelle Wallays (BEL)	Topsport Vlaanderen–Mercator	+ 19"

=== Stage 5 ===
15 September 2011 – Exeter to Exmouth, 180.3 km (112.0 mi)

After several mini-attacks in the early running of the stage, it was not until around 40 km (24.9 mi) into the stage that the breakaway developed. The breakaway had been instigated by Rapha Condor–Sharp rider Jonathan Tiernan-Locke at the foot of the first climb at Haytor Rocks, and would eventually swell to a total of thirteen riders, who held a maximum advantage of almost six minutes. Tiernan-Locke, as well as winning maximum points at Haytor Rocks, claimed both of the second category climbs that were held later on the stage. As a result of his points on the day, he assumed the lead of the mountains classification from Sigma Sport–Specialized's Russell Hampton, who had held the lead of the classification since the opening stage in Scotland.

The field brought back the breakaway quickly, although there was a counter-attack from the break, with Damien Gaudin of Team Europcar going off the front with 25 km (15.5 mi) remaining. Gaudin's bid for victory was eventually stunted within the closing 3 km (1.9 mi) of the stage. HTC–Highroad made their presence at the front of the field, in a bid to repeat their victory on Stage 1 with Mark Cavendish. However, Cavendish decided not to fully sprint for the line to allow Mark Renshaw – a rider who has led out Cavendish to many of his victories over their time at the team – to take the stage victory. Cavendish led the rest of the field over the line, ahead of Robert Förster, Geraint Thomas and Andrew Fenn. Rabobank's Lars Boom maintained his twelve-second lead in the general classification over Thomas, who took the lead of the points classification from Boom.

Stage 5 Result

	Rider	Team	Time
1	Mark Renshaw (AUS)	HTC–Highroad	4h 17' 38"
2	Mark Cavendish (GBR)	HTC–Highroad	s.t.
3	Robert Förster (GER)	UnitedHealthcare	s.t.
4	Geraint Thomas (GBR)	Team Sky	s.t.
5	Andrew Fenn (GBR)	An Post–Sean Kelly	s.t.
6	Mathew Hayman (AUS)	Team Sky	s.t.
7	Zak Dempster (AUS)	Rapha Condor–Sharp	s.t.
8	Stijn Neirynck (BEL)	Topsport Vlaanderen–Mercator	s.t.
9	Daniel Schorn (AUT)	Team NetApp	s.t.
10	Giacomo Nizzolo (ITA)	Leopard Trek	s.t.

General Classification after Stage 5

	Rider	Team	Time
1	Lars Boom (NED)	Rabobank	16h 54' 29"
2	Geraint Thomas (GBR)	Team Sky	+ 12"
3	Boy Van Poppel (NED)	UnitedHealthcare	+ 14"
4	Daniel Lloyd (GBR)	Garmin–Cervélo	+ 16"
5	Linus Gerdemann (GER)	Leopard Trek	+ 17"
6	Ian Bibby (GBR)	Motorpoint Pro–Cycling Team	+ 19"
7	Jelle Wallays (BEL)	Topsport Vlaanderen–Mercator	+ 19"
8	Steve Cummings (GBR)	Team Sky	+ 19"
9	Bert-Jan Lindeman (NED)	Vacansoleil–DCM	+ 19"
10	Bram Tankink (NED)	Rabobank	+ 19"

=== Stage 6 ===
16 September 2011 – Taunton to Wells, 146 km (90.7 mi)

Four riders made up the day's breakaway – Team Sky's Ben Swift, An Post–Sean Kelly's Mark McNally, Paul Voss of Endura Racing and Lars Bak for the HTC–Highroad team – but none of the quartet were in great contention to take any of the jerseys during the stage. The day's first intermediate sprint, coming at 20 km (12.4 mi) into the stage, saw several riders fall while contesting the sprint; most notably points classification leader Geraint Thomas and Ian Bibby of Motorpoint Pro–Cycling Team, with the latter forced to abandon the race due to a broken collarbone. The sprint itself was won by race leader Lars Boom, putting another three seconds onto his overall lead, prior to the breakaway move, who held station off the front until the closing 25 km (15.5 mi) of the stage, when 17 other riders bridged the gap to them, and provided for a reduced field sprint finish. Boom was the strongest rider in the remaining riders, and comfortably took the stage win, extending his general classification lead to 28 seconds over Team NetApp's Leopold König, who finished third on the stage. Boom also regained the points classification lead from the delayed Thomas.

Stage 6 Result

	Rider	Team	Time
1	Lars Boom (NED)	Rabobank	3h 19' 02"
2	Alexandre Pichot (FRA)	Team Europcar	s.t.
3	Leopold König (CZE)	Team NetApp	s.t.
4	Jan Bárta (CZE)	Team NetApp	s.t.
5	Steve Cummings (GBR)	Team Sky	s.t.
6	Linus Gerdemann (GER)	Leopard Trek	s.t.
7	Jack Bauer (NZL)	Endura Racing	s.t.
8	Julian Dean (NZL)	Garmin–Cervélo	s.t.
9	Bartosz Huzarski (POL)	Team NetApp	s.t.
10	Iker Camaño (ESP)	Endura Racing	s.t.

General Classification after Stage 6

	Rider	Team	Time
1	Lars Boom (NED)	Rabobank	20h 13' 18"
2	Leopold König (CZE)	Team NetApp	+ 28"
3	Daniel Lloyd (GBR)	Garmin–Cervélo	+ 29"
4	Linus Gerdemann (GER)	Leopard Trek	+ 31"
5	Steve Cummings (GBR)	Team Sky	+ 32"
6	Jelle Wallays (BEL)	Topsport Vlaanderen–Mercator	+ 32"
7	Jan Bárta (CZE)	Team NetApp	+ 32"
8	Jonathan Tiernan-Locke (GBR)	Rapha Condor–Sharp	+ 32"
9	Iker Camaño (ESP)	Endura Racing	+ 50"
10	Joost Posthuma (NED)	Leopard Trek	+ 52"

=== Stage 7 ===
17 September 2011 – Bury St Edmunds to Sandringham, 199.7 km (124.1 mi)

The breakaway was the key to the day's stage, having made an escape from the field after just 5.5 km (3.4 mi), and ultimately held an advantage of almost 90 seconds all the way to the end of the stage. Six riders from six different teams – Gediminas Bagdonas of An Post–Sean Kelly, Ian Wilkinson of Endura Racing, Team Europcar's Mathieu Claude, Topsport Vlaanderen–Mercator's Stijn Neirynck, and riding for British continental teams Team Raleigh and Sigma Sport–Specialized, Richard Handley and Wouter Sybrandy – were left to fight for the victory themselves, with Rabobank ending a pursuit to catch them with around 30 km (18.6 mi) remaining, instead deciding to protect their leader Lars Boom and his lead overall. Bagdonas ultimately took the stage win ahead of Wilkinson, Claude and Neirynck, as Boom maintained his lead of 28 seconds in the general classification over Team NetApp's Leopold König, ahead of the final day's split-stages. Boom and König both finished in the pack led home by Mark Cavendish, 83 seconds behind Bagdonas.

Stage 7 Result

	Rider	Team	Time
1	Gediminas Bagdonas (LTU)	An Post–Sean Kelly	4h 33' 17"
2	Ian Wilkinson (GBR)	Endura Racing	s.t.
3	Mathieu Claude (FRA)	Team Europcar	s.t.
4	Stijn Neirynck (BEL)	Topsport Vlaanderen–Mercator	s.t.
5	Richard Handley (GBR)	Team Raleigh	+ 4"
6	Wouter Sybrandy (NED)	Sigma Sport–Specialized	+ 11"
7	Mark Cavendish (GBR)	HTC–Highroad	+ 1' 23"
8	Andrew Fenn (GBR)	An Post–Sean Kelly	+ 1' 23"
9	Giacomo Nizzolo (ITA)	Leopard Trek	+ 1' 23"
10	Geraint Thomas (GBR)	Team Sky	+ 1' 23"

General Classification after Stage 7

	Rider	Team	Time
1	Lars Boom (NED)	Rabobank	24h 47' 58"
2	Leopold König (CZE)	Team NetApp	+ 28"
3	Daniel Lloyd (GBR)	Garmin–Cervélo	+ 29"
4	Linus Gerdemann (GER)	Leopard Trek	+ 31"
5	Steve Cummings (GBR)	Team Sky	+ 32"
6	Jan Bárta (CZE)	Team NetApp	+ 32"
7	Jelle Wallays (BEL)	Topsport Vlaanderen–Mercator	+ 32"
8	Jonathan Tiernan-Locke (GBR)	Rapha Condor–Sharp	+ 32"
9	Iker Camaño (ESP)	Endura Racing	+ 50"
10	Joost Posthuma (NED)	Leopard Trek	+ 52"

=== Stage 8a ===
18 September 2011 – London, 8.8 km (5.5 mi) individual time trial (ITT)

The first of the final day's pair of stages was a short circuit through London, around Whitehall and the Thames Embankment, measuring 8.8 km (5.5 mi). The early benchmark was set by the second rider out on the course, Rick Flens of Rabobank, with a time of 10' 41" that stood well against the majority of the early runners, and was not bettered until Endura Racing's Alexander Wetterhall, the former Swedish national time trial champion, broke the timing beam with a time of 10' 33". Just like Flens before him, Wetterhall's time also managed to give him the best time for a while, and it was not until Lieuwe Westra of Vacansoleil–DCM that Wetterhall was displaced from the top spot.

Westra's time of 10' 19" remained unchallenged for another fifteen minutes – riders outside the top ten in the general classification left the start at one-minute intervals – until Team Sky's Alex Dowsett went round the course some five seconds quicker than Westra did. Dowsett's time was ultimately good enough for the stage victory, for his first victory in the race. As the top ten took to the course in two-minute intervals, it was Dowsett's team-mate Steve Cummings that made up the most ground on time, as he finished nine seconds off Dowsett's time, a result that would lift him from fifth place to second place in the general classification. Despite Cummings' position gain, he lost four seconds to race leader Lars Boom, as he finished the course marginally quicker than Westra, to claim second place on the stage.

Stage 8a Result

	Rider	Team	Time
1	Alex Dowsett (GBR)	Team Sky	10' 14"
2	Lars Boom (NED)	Rabobank	+ 5"
3	Lieuwe Westra (NED)	Vacansoleil–DCM	+ 5"
4	Steve Cummings (GBR)	Team Sky	+ 9"
5	Geraint Thomas (GBR)	Team Sky	+ 16"
6	Alexander Wetterhall (SWE)	Endura Racing	+ 19"
7	Michael Rogers (AUS)	Team Sky	+ 19"
8	Thor Hushovd (NOR)	Garmin–Cervélo	+ 23"
9	Damien Gaudin (FRA)	Team Europcar	+ 25"
10	Joost Posthuma (NED)	Leopard Trek	+ 26"

General Classification after Stage 8a

	Rider	Team	Time
1	Lars Boom (NED)	Rabobank	24h 58' 17"
2	Steve Cummings (GBR)	Team Sky	+ 36"
3	Jan Bárta (CZE)	Team NetApp	+ 56"
4	Linus Gerdemann (GER)	Leopard Trek	+ 57"
5	Leopold König (CZE)	Team NetApp	+ 1' 01"
6	Jonathan Tiernan-Locke (GBR)	Rapha Condor–Sharp	+ 1' 03"
7	Jelle Wallays (BEL)	Topsport Vlaanderen–Mercator	+ 1' 12"
8	Iker Camaño (ESP)	Endura Racing	+ 1' 12"
9	Joost Posthuma (NED)	Leopard Trek	+ 1' 13"
10	Daniel Lloyd (GBR)	Garmin–Cervélo	+ 1' 25"

=== Stage 8b ===
18 September 2011 – London, 88 km (54.7 mi)

The race's final stage was held over the same circuit as the individual time trial that had taken place hours before, with ten laps of the circuit making up the stage distance of 88 km (54.7 mi). As had been the case in many of the week's stage, a rider from the An Post–Sean Kelly team made their way into the stage breakaway, with Ronan McLaughlin latterly joined by Rapha Condor–Sharp rider Kristian House towards the end of the first lap of the circuit, but their advantage never exceeded more than 40 seconds as Rabobank and HTC–Highroad looked to keep the gap at a minimum in preparation for the finish.

After starting the stage in dry conditions, rain started to fall towards the end of the eighth lap of the race, providing the race's 79 remaining riders with an added danger in the closing stages. House attacked off McLaughlin on the final lap, but was eventually swallowed up by the main field prior to the bunch sprint at the finish. Robert Förster of UnitedHealthcare led the sprint out ahead of Mark Renshaw and Geraint Thomas, but it was Mark Cavendish, who turned into the final straight in fifth position, who took the stage victory ahead of Renshaw – HTC–Highroad's third one-two finish of the Tour – and allowed Cavendish to head to the UCI Road World Championships in Copenhagen, Denmark on a high. Lars Boom finished in the main field to seal the race victory, and he became the first Dutch rider to win the Tour of Britain. Despite his overall victory, Boom surrendered the victory in the points classification on the finish to Thomas, after his fourth place on the stage behind Cavendish, Renshaw and Förster.

Stage 8b Result

	Rider	Team	Time
1	Mark Cavendish (GBR)	HTC–Highroad	1h 59' 13"
2	Mark Renshaw (AUS)	HTC–Highroad	s.t.
3	Robert Förster (GER)	UnitedHealthcare	s.t.
4	Geraint Thomas (GBR)	Team Sky	s.t.
5	Ben Swift (GBR)	Team Sky	s.t.
6	Giacomo Nizzolo (ITA)	Leopard Trek	s.t.
7	Tobyn Horton (GBR)	Motorpoint Pro–Cycling Team	s.t.
8	Andrew Fenn (GBR)	An Post–Sean Kelly	s.t.
9	Dan Craven (NAM)	Rapha Condor–Sharp	s.t.
10	Stijn Neirynck (BEL)	Topsport Vlaanderen–Mercator	s.t.

Final General Classification

	Rider	Team	Time
1	Lars Boom (NED)	Rabobank	26h 57' 35"
2	Steve Cummings (GBR)	Team Sky	+ 36"
3	Jan Bárta (CZE)	Team NetApp	+ 55"
4	Linus Gerdemann (GER)	Leopard Trek	+ 57"
5	Jonathan Tiernan-Locke (GBR)	Rapha Condor–Sharp	+ 1' 03"
6	Iker Camaño (ESP)	Endura Racing	+ 1' 07"
7	Jelle Wallays (BEL)	Topsport Vlaanderen–Mercator	+ 1' 12"
8	Joost Posthuma (NED)	Leopard Trek	+ 1' 13"
9	Leopold König (CZE)	Team NetApp	+ 1' 19"
10	Daniel Lloyd (GBR)	Garmin–Cervélo	+ 1' 25"

== Classification leadership ==
Stage	Winner	General classification	Sprint Classification	Mountains Classification	Points Classification	Team Classification
1	Mark Cavendish	Mark Cavendish	Pieter Ghyllebert	Russell Hampton	Mark Cavendish	Team Sky
2	stage cancelled	Mark Cavendish	Pieter Ghyllebert	Russell Hampton	Mark Cavendish	Team Sky
3	Lars Boom	Lars Boom	Pieter Ghyllebert	Russell Hampton	Mark Cavendish	Rabobank
4	Thor Hushovd	Lars Boom	Pieter Ghyllebert	Russell Hampton	Lars Boom	Team Sky
5	Mark Renshaw	Lars Boom	Pieter Ghyllebert	Jonathan Tiernan-Locke	Geraint Thomas	Team Sky
6	Lars Boom	Lars Boom	Pieter Ghyllebert	Jonathan Tiernan-Locke	Lars Boom	Team Sky
7	Gediminas Bagdonas	Lars Boom	Pieter Ghyllebert	Jonathan Tiernan-Locke	Lars Boom	Team Sky
8a	Alex Dowsett	Lars Boom	Pieter Ghyllebert	Jonathan Tiernan-Locke	Lars Boom	Team Sky
8b	Mark Cavendish	Lars Boom	Pieter Ghyllebert	Jonathan Tiernan-Locke	Geraint Thomas	Team Sky
Final		Lars Boom	Pieter Ghyllebert	Jonathan Tiernan-Locke	Geraint Thomas	Team Sky
