= 2010 Tour of Britain =

UCI Europe Tour
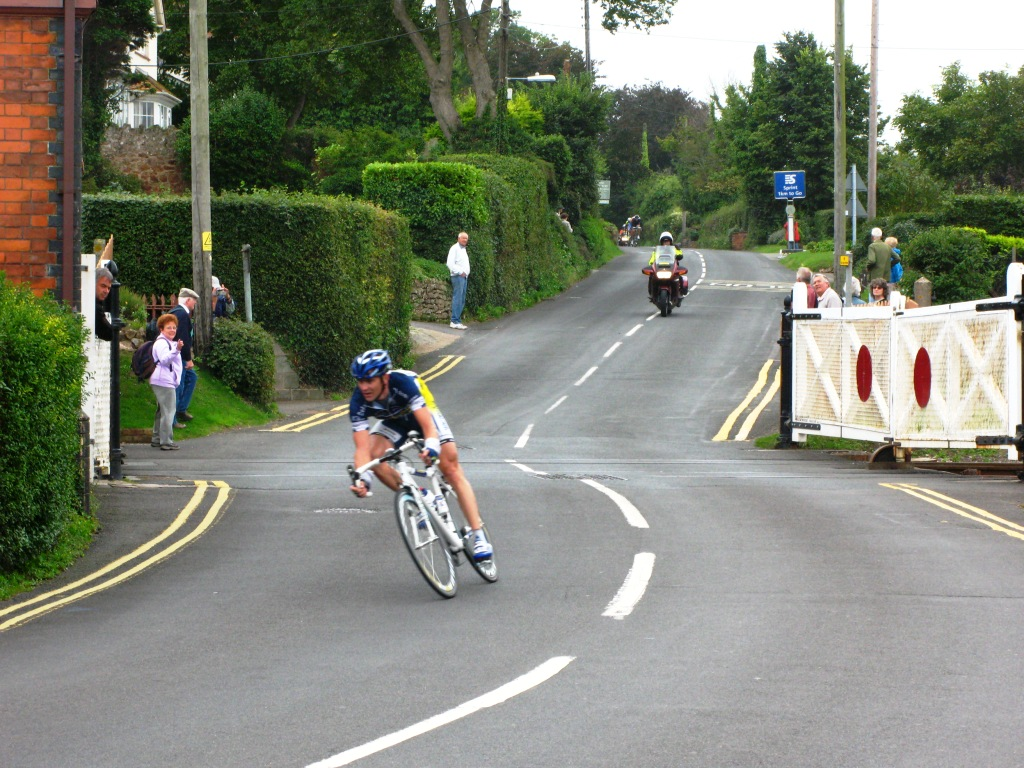
- The intermediate sprint at Blue Anchor, led by Borut Božič

Race details
- Dates: 11–18 September 2010
- Stages: 8
- Distance: 1,223 km (759.9 mi)
- Winning time: 29h 23' 47"

Results
Jersey awarded to the overall winner	Winner	Michael Albasini (SUI)	(Team HTC–Columbia)
	Second	Borut Božič (SLO)	(Vacansoleil)
	Third	Greg Henderson (NZL)	(Team Sky)
Jersey awarded to the points classification winner	Points	Greg Henderson (NZL)	(Team Sky)
Jersey awarded to the mountains classification winner	Mountains	Johnny Hoogerland (NED)	(Vacansoleil)
Jersey awarded to the sprints classification winner	Sprints	Michał Gołaś (POL)	(Vacansoleil)
	Team	Vacansoleil	

The 2010 Tour of Britain was a UCI 2.1 category race of eight stages that was held from 11 to 18 September 2010. The race was the seventh edition of the latest version of the Tour of Britain and the 71st British tour in total. It formed part of the 2009–2010 UCI Europe Tour. The race began in Rochdale and ended with a circuit stage in London. The Tour was won by a HTC–Highroad rider for the second successive year, as Switzerland's Michael Albasini won the race by over a minute.

== Participating teams ==
UCI ProTour Teams

- GRM – Garmin–Transitions
- THR – Team HTC–Columbia
- SAX – Team Saxo Bank
- SKY – Team Sky

UCI Professional Continental Teams

- CSF – Colnago–CSF Inox
- CTT – Cervélo TestTeam
- SKS – Skil–Shimano
- TSV – Topsport Vlaanderen–Mercator
- ISD – ISD–NERI
- VAC – Vacansoleil

UCI Continental Teams

- SKT – An Post–Sean Kelly
- EDR – Endura Racing
- MPT – Motorpoint–Marshalls Pasta
- RAL – Team Raleigh
- RCS – Rapha Condor–Sharp
- SGS – Sigma Sport–Specialized

Other Teams

- IRE – Ireland National Team

== Stages ==
=== Stage 1 ===
11 September 2010 – Rochdale to Blackpool, 126 km (78 mi)

Stage 1 Result

	Rider	Team	Time
1	André Greipel (GER)	Team HTC–Columbia	3h 16' 48"
2	Manuel Belletti (ITA)	Colnago–CSF Inox	s.t.
3	Greg Henderson (NZL)	Team Sky	s.t.
4	Alex Rasmussen (DEN)	Team Saxo Bank	s.t.
5	Martin Reimer (GER)	Cervélo TestTeam	s.t.
6	Robert Wagner (GER)	Skil–Shimano	s.t.
7	Gianluca Brambilla (ITA)	Colnago–CSF Inox	s.t.
8	Ed Clancy (GBR)	Motorpoint–Marshalls Pasta	s.t.
9	Russell Downing (GBR)	Team Sky	s.t.
10	Michael Van Staeyen (BEL)	Topsport Vlaanderen–Mercator	s.t.

General Classification after Stage 1

	Rider	Team	Time
1	André Greipel (GER)	Team HTC–Columbia	3h 16' 36"
2	Manuel Belletti (ITA)	Colnago–CSF Inox	+ 6"
3	Greg Henderson (NZL)	Team Sky	+ 8"
4	Russell Downing (GBR)	Team Sky	+ 8"
5	Richie Porte (AUS)	Team Saxo Bank	+ 9"
6	Martin Reimer (GER)	Cervélo TestTeam	+ 11"
7	Wout Poels (NED)	Vacansoleil	+ 11"
8	Alex Rasmussen (DEN)	Team Saxo Bank	+ 12"
9	Robert Wagner (GER)	Skil–Shimano	+ 12"
10	Gianluca Brambilla (ITA)	Colnago–CSF Inox	+ 12"

=== Stage 2 ===
12 September 2010 – Stoke-on-Trent, 160 km (99 mi)

Stage 2 Result

	Rider	Team	Time
1	Greg Henderson (NZL)	Team Sky	3h 59' 52"
2	Michael Albasini (SUI)	Team HTC–Columbia	s.t.
3	Heinrich Haussler (AUS)	Cervélo TestTeam	s.t.
4	Koen de Kort (NED)	Skil–Shimano	s.t.
5	Patrik Sinkewitz (GER)	ISD–NERI	s.t.
6	Travis Meyer (AUS)	Garmin–Transitions	+ 3"
7	Michał Gołaś (POL)	Vacansoleil	+ 3"
8	Johnny Hoogerland (NED)	Vacansoleil	+ 3"
9	Borut Božič (SLO)	Vacansoleil	+ 3"
10	Dan Craven (NAM)	Rapha Condor–Sharp	+ 3"

General Classification after Stage 2

	Rider	Team	Time
1	Greg Henderson (NZL)	Team Sky	7h 16' 23"
2	Michael Albasini (SUI)	Team HTC–Columbia	+ 14"
3	Heinrich Haussler (AUS)	Cervélo TestTeam	+ 14"
4	Richie Porte (AUS)	Team Saxo Bank	+ 14"
5	Koen de Kort (NED)	Skil–Shimano	+ 17"
6	Michał Gołaś (POL)	Vacansoleil	+ 18"
7	Patrik Sinkewitz (GER)	ISD–NERI	+ 18"
8	Borut Božič (SLO)	Vacansoleil	+ 20"
9	Travis Meyer (AUS)	Garmin–Transitions	+ 23"
10	Dan Craven (NAM)	Rapha Condor–Sharp	+ 23"

=== Stage 3 ===
13 September 2010 – Newtown to Swansea, 150 km (93 mi)

Stage 3 Result

	Rider	Team	Time
1	Michael Albasini (SUI)	Team HTC–Columbia	3h 40' 37"
2	Ian Bibby (GBR)	Motorpoint–Marshalls Pasta	+ 8"
3	Stijn Neirynck (BEL)	Topsport Vlaanderen–Mercator	+ 8"
4	Cameron Meyer (AUS)	Garmin–Transitions	+ 21"
5	Mark McNally (GBR)	An Post–Sean Kelly	+ 28"
6	Simon Richardson (GBR)	Sigma Sport–Specialized	+ 31"
7	Richie Porte (AUS)	Team Saxo Bank	+ 1' 15"
8	Jack Bauer (NZL)	Endura Racing	+ 1' 16"
9	Tony Martin (GER)	Team HTC–Columbia	+ 1' 18"
10	Johnny Hoogerland (NED)	Vacansoleil	+ 1' 24"

General Classification after Stage 3

	Rider	Team	Time
1	Michael Albasini (SUI)	Team HTC–Columbia	10h 57' 01"
2	Greg Henderson (NZL)	Team Sky	+ 1' 26"
3	Richie Porte (AUS)	Team Saxo Bank	+ 1' 28"
4	Borut Božič (SLO)	Vacansoleil	+ 1' 41"
5	Johnny Hoogerland (NED)	Vacansoleil	+ 1' 46"
6	Michał Gołaś (POL)	Vacansoleil	+ 2' 08"
7	Patrik Sinkewitz (GER)	ISD–NERI	+ 2' 08"
8	Travis Meyer (AUS)	Garmin–Transitions	+ 2' 10"
9	Christian Meier (CAN)	Garmin–Transitions	+ 2' 10"
10	Rob Partridge (GBR)	Endura Racing	+ 2' 13"

=== Stage 4 ===
14 September 2010 – Minehead to Teignmouth, 171 km

Stage 4 Result

	Rider	Team	Time
1	Wout Poels (NED)	Vacansoleil	4h 30' 35"
2	Borut Božič (SLO)	Vacansoleil	+ 5"
3	Koen de Kort (NED)	Skil–Shimano	+ 5"
4	Jack Bauer (NZL)	Endura Racing	+ 5"
5	Patrik Sinkewitz (GER)	ISD–NERI	+ 5"
6	Richie Porte (AUS)	Team Saxo Bank	+ 5"
7	Michael Albasini (SUI)	Team HTC–Columbia	+ 5"
8	Johnny Hoogerland (NED)	Vacansoleil	+ 5"
9	Domenico Pozzovivo (ITA)	Colnago–CSF Inox	+ 11"
10	Alex Rasmussen (DEN)	Team Saxo Bank	+ 15"

General Classification after Stage 4

	Rider	Team	Time
1	Michael Albasini (SUI)	Team HTC–Columbia	15h 27' 41"
2	Richie Porte (AUS)	Team Saxo Bank	+ 1' 28"
3	Borut Božič (SLO)	Vacansoleil	+ 1' 32"
4	Greg Henderson (NZL)	Team Sky	+ 1' 36"
5	Johnny Hoogerland (NED)	Vacansoleil	+ 1' 42"
6	Patrik Sinkewitz (GER)	ISD–NERI	+ 2' 08"
7	Christian Meier (CAN)	Garmin–Transitions	+ 2' 30"
8	Rob Partridge (GBR)	Endura Racing	+ 2' 32"
9	Koen de Kort (NED)	Skil–Shimano	+ 2' 43"
10	Geraint Thomas (GBR)	Team Sky	+ 5' 38"

=== Stage 5 ===
15 September 2010 – Tavistock to Glastonbury, 176 km (109 mi)

Stage 5 Result

	Rider	Team	Time
1	Marco Frapporti (ITA)	Colnago–CSF Inox	4h 16' 10"
2	Bradley Wiggins (GBR)	Team Sky	+ 13"
3	Lucas Sebastián Haedo (ARG)	Team Saxo Bank	+ 32"
4	Iker Camaño (ESP)	Endura Racing	+ 32"
5	Michał Gołaś (POL)	Vacansoleil	+ 32"
6	Pieter Ghyllebert (BEL)	An Post–Sean Kelly	+ 50"
7	Dan Martin (IRL)	Garmin–Transitions	+ 51"
8	Ronan van Zandbeek (NED)	Skil–Shimano	+ 6' 36"
9	Pim Ligthart (NED)	Vacansoleil	+ 9' 18"
10	Stijn Neirynck (BEL)	Topsport Vlaanderen–Mercator	+ 9' 18"

General Classification after Stage 5

	Rider	Team	Time
1	Michael Albasini (SUI)	Team HTC–Columbia	19h 53' 09"
2	Richie Porte (AUS)	Team Saxo Bank	+ 1' 28"
3	Borut Božič (SLO)	Vacansoleil	+ 1' 32"
4	Greg Henderson (NZL)	Team Sky	+ 1' 36"
5	Johnny Hoogerland (NED)	Vacansoleil	+ 1' 42"
6	Patrik Sinkewitz (GER)	ISD–NERI	+ 2' 08"
7	Christian Meier (CAN)	Garmin–Transitions	+ 2' 30"
8	Rob Partridge (GBR)	Endura Racing	+ 2' 32"
9	Koen de Kort (NED)	Skil–Shimano	+ 2' 43"
10	Marco Frapporti (ITA)	Colnago–CSF Inox	+ 3' 36"

=== Stage 6 ===
16 September 2010 – King's Lynn to Great Yarmouth, 189 km (117 mi)

Stage 6 Result

	Rider	Team	Time
1	André Greipel (GER)	Team HTC–Columbia	4h 09' 05"
2	Borut Božič (SLO)	Vacansoleil	s.t.
3	Lucas Sebastián Haedo (ARG)	Team Saxo Bank	s.t.
4	Greg Henderson (NZL)	Team Sky	s.t.
5	Pierpaolo De Negri (ITA)	ISD–NERI	s.t.
6	Stijn Neirynck (BEL)	Topsport Vlaanderen–Mercator	s.t.
7	Koen de Kort (NED)	Skil–Shimano	s.t.
8	Marco Frapporti (ITA)	Colnago–CSF Inox	s.t.
9	Robert Wagner (GER)	Skil–Shimano	s.t.
10	Ed Clancy (GBR)	Motorpoint–Marshalls Pasta	s.t.

General Classification after Stage 6

	Rider	Team	Time
1	Michael Albasini (SUI)	Team HTC–Columbia	24h 02' 14"
2	Borut Božič (SLO)	Vacansoleil	+ 1' 26"
3	Richie Porte (AUS)	Team Saxo Bank	+ 1' 27"
4	Greg Henderson (NZL)	Team Sky	+ 1' 33"
5	Johnny Hoogerland (NED)	Vacansoleil	+ 1' 37"
6	Patrik Sinkewitz (GER)	ISD–NERI	+ 2' 08"
7	Christian Meier (CAN)	Garmin–Transitions	+ 2' 30"
8	Rob Partridge (GBR)	Endura Racing	+ 2' 32"
9	Koen de Kort (NED)	Skil–Shimano	+ 2' 43"
10	Marco Frapporti (ITA)	Colnago–CSF Inox	+ 3' 36"

=== Stage 7 ===
17 September 2010 – Bury St Edmunds to Colchester, 151 km (94 mi)

Stage 7 Result

	Rider	Team	Time
1	Borut Božič (SLO)	Vacansoleil	3h 24' 15"
2	Greg Henderson (NZL)	Team Sky	s.t.
3	Richie Porte (AUS)	Team Saxo Bank	+ 3"
4	Pierpaolo De Negri (ITA)	ISD–NERI	+ 3"
5	Koen de Kort (NED)	Skil–Shimano	+ 3"
6	Jonathan McEvoy (GBR)	Motorpoint–Marshalls Pasta	+ 3"
7	Stijn Neirynck (BEL)	Topsport Vlaanderen–Mercator	+ 3"
8	Alexandre Blain (FRA)	Endura Racing	+ 6"
9	Jack Bauer (NZL)	Endura Racing	+ 6"
10	Zak Dempster (AUS)	Rapha Condor–Sharp	+ 6"

General Classification after Stage 7

	Rider	Team	Time
1	Michael Albasini (SUI)	Team HTC–Columbia	27h 26' 40"
2	Borut Božič (SLO)	Vacansoleil	+ 1' 05"
3	Richie Porte (AUS)	Team Saxo Bank	+ 1' 14"
4	Greg Henderson (NZL)	Team Sky	+ 1' 16"
5	Johnny Hoogerland (NED)	Vacansoleil	+ 1' 32"
6	Patrik Sinkewitz (GER)	ISD–NERI	+ 2' 12"
7	Christian Meier (CAN)	Garmin–Transitions	+ 2' 30"
8	Rob Partridge (GBR)	Endura Racing	+ 2' 32"
9	Koen de Kort (NED)	Skil–Shimano	+ 2' 35"
10	Marco Frapporti (ITA)	Colnago–CSF Inox	+ 3' 31"

=== Stage 8 ===
18 September 2010 – London, 100 km (62 mi)

The final stage of the 2010 edition was a circuit race in Newham, London. It was originally intended that the final stage would be in the centre of London but, due to the visit of Pope Benedict XVI to London, the organisers were forced to find an alternative location.

Stage 8 Result

	Rider	Team	Time
1	André Greipel (GER)	Team HTC–Columbia	1h 57' 07"
2	Lucas Sebastián Haedo (ARG)	Team Saxo Bank	s.t.
3	Roger Hammond (GBR)	Cervélo TestTeam	s.t.
4	Greg Henderson (NZL)	Team Sky	s.t.
5	Borut Božič (SLO)	Vacansoleil	s.t.
6	Robert Wagner (GER)	Skil–Shimano	s.t.
7	Russell Downing (GBR)	Team Sky	s.t.
8	Ed Clancy (GBR)	Motorpoint–Marshalls Pasta	s.t.
9	Marco Frapporti (ITA)	Colnago–CSF Inox	s.t.
10	Zak Dempster (AUS)	Rapha Condor–Sharp	s.t.

Final General Classification

	Rider	Team	Time
1	Michael Albasini (SUI)	Team HTC–Columbia	29h 23' 47"
2	Borut Božič (SLO)	Vacansoleil	+ 1' 05"
3	Greg Henderson (NZL)	Team Sky	+ 1' 10"
4	Richie Porte (AUS)	Team Saxo Bank	+ 1' 13"
5	Johnny Hoogerland (NED)	Vacansoleil	+ 1' 32"
6	Patrik Sinkewitz (GER)	ISD–NERI	+ 2' 12"
7	Christian Meier (CAN)	Garmin–Transitions	+ 2' 30"
8	Rob Partridge (GBR)	Endura Racing	+ 2' 32"
9	Koen de Kort (NED)	Skil–Shimano	+ 2' 35"
10	Marco Frapporti (ITA)	Colnago–CSF Inox	+ 3' 31"

== Classification leadership ==
Stage	Winner	General classification	Sprint Classification	Mountains Classification	Points Classification	Team Classification
1	André Greipel	André Greipel	Richie Porte	Wout Poels	André Greipel	Colnago–CSF Inox
2	Greg Henderson	Greg Henderson	Richie Porte	Richie Porte	Greg Henderson	Vacansoleil
3	Michael Albasini	Michael Albasini	Richie Porte	Richie Porte	Greg Henderson	Vacansoleil
4	Wout Poels	Michael Albasini	Richie Porte	Johnny Hoogerland	Michael Albasini	Vacansoleil
5	Marco Frapporti	Michael Albasini	Michał Gołaś	Johnny Hoogerland	Michael Albasini	Vacansoleil
6	André Greipel	Michael Albasini	Michał Gołaś	Johnny Hoogerland	Greg Henderson	Vacansoleil
7	Borut Božič	Michael Albasini	Michał Gołaś	Johnny Hoogerland	Greg Henderson	Vacansoleil
8	André Greipel	Michael Albasini	Michał Gołaś	Johnny Hoogerland	Greg Henderson	Vacansoleil
Final		Michael Albasini	Michał Gołaś	Johnny Hoogerland	Greg Henderson	Vacansoleil
