= Claire Fraser =

Claire Fraser may refer to:

- Claire M. Fraser (born 1955), American microbiologist
- Claire Fraser (character), a fictional character in the Outlander series of novels
- Claire Fraser (cyclist) (born 1985), road cyclist from Guyana
