= Cycling at the 2010 Commonwealth Games – Women's road time trial =

Cycling – Women's road time trial at the 2010 Commonwealth Games
- Venue: Noida Expressway
- Dates: 13 October 2010
- Competitors: 28

The women's time trial took place at 13 October 2010 at the Noida Expressway. The race started at 10:30 and covered 29 km.

== Final classification ==
Rank	Rider	Time
1st place, gold medalist(s)	Tara Whitten (CAN)	38:59.30
2nd place, silver medalist(s)	Linda Villumsen (NZL)	39:04.15
3rd place, bronze medalist(s)	Julia Shaw (ENG)	39:09.52
4	Alexis Rhodes (AUS)	39:22.54
5	Melissa Holt (NZL)	39:22.96
6	Wendy Houvenaghel (NIR)	39:34.97
7	Victoria Whitelaw (AUS)	40:05.47
8	Emma Trott (ENG)	40:19.52
9	Emma Pooley (ENG)	40:25.22
10	Alison Shanks (NZL)	40:30.71
11	Erinne Willock (CAN)	41:16.46
12	Ruth Corset (AUS)	41:30.88
13	Julie Beveridge (CAN)	41:30.88
14	Aurelie Halbwachs (MRI)	42:16.99
15	Heather Wilson (NIR)	42:48.77
16	Pippa Handley (SCO)	43:28.68
17	Sunita Devi (IND)	44:52.51
18	Shalini Zabaneh (BIZ)	45:18.60
19	Ann Bowditch (GUE)	46:18.32
20	Pana Choudhary (IND)	47:19.15
21	Helen Dewvi (IND)	47:26.23
22	Lasanthi Gunathilaka (SRI)	47:38.26
23	Joyce Nyaruri (KEN)	47:46.36
24	Claire Fraser (GUY)	48:57.17
25	Jane Kamau (KEN)	52:53.25
26	Hadijah Najjuko (UGA)	53:19.19
27	Marion Ayebale (UGA)	54:00.04
28	Sharon Kiragu (KEN)	56:28.85
