= Matthew Stephens (cyclist) =

English racing cyclist (born 1970)

Personal information
- Full name: Matthew Stephens
- Born: 4 January 1970 (age 56) Edgware, London, England
- Height: 6 ft 0 in (1.83 m)

Cycling career
- Sport: Cycling
- Current team: Sigma Sports
- Discipline: Road
- Role: Rider (retired); Sporting director

Amateur teams
- 1986–1989: Hemel Hempstead CC
- 1990–1992: ACBB Paris
- 1993: Ribble - RT Italia
- 1994–1997: North Wirral Velo

Professional teams
- 1998: Harrods
- 1999–2001: Linda McCartney Racing Team
- 2001–2011: Team Sigma Sport

Major wins
- One-day races and Classics National Road Race Championships (1998)

Matthew Stephens (born 4 January 1970) is a British former road racing cyclist and cycling presenter who competed as a professional between 1998 and 2011. He was the 1998 British National Road Race Champion.

== Biography ==
As a junior rider, Stephens won the Junior Tour of Wales in both 1987 and 1988, one of only two riders to win the race twice. He represented Great Britain at the 1992 Summer Olympics in Barcelona, finishing 61st in the road race. Stephens finished 8th in the Amateur World Road Race Championships in 1995, forming part of a break on the second lap of the race alongside eventual winner Danny Nelissen and earning Team GB their squad for the Atlanta Olympics in 1996 (automatic qualification for the Games was restricted to nations with finishers in the top 15 of the 1995 World Championships). However, he was not selected for the Olympic Road Race team that year. He became the British National Road Race Champion in 1998.

After this he turned professional with the British-based Harrods team in 1998, before riding for the Linda McCartney Racing Team in 1999 until their demise in February 2001. During the 2000 3-week Giro d'Italia, he battled through with injuries from a fall on day 2 of racing, earning media admiration and ultimately dropping out 17 days later.

He rode for Sigma Sport between 2001 and 2011, acting as rider/manager from 2010 onwards. He combined his racing at Sigma Sport with a career in the police with Cheshire Constabulary, which he joined in 2001. A broken knee in the 2011 Paris-Troyes ended his racing career.

Since retiring from racing, he has written for various websites as well as being the 'specialist' on ITV4's Halfords Tour Series and Tour of Britain coverage, and commentating on live races for British Cycling's Premier Calendar and Eurosport. He also worked as a presenter for Global Cycling Network. On 24 April 2018, he announced on the weekly Global Cycling Network (GCN) show that he would leave GCN, shifting his focus to race commentary work and live events.

Since 2018, he has presented "Matt Stephens Cafe Ride" for the Sigma Sports YouTube Channel. During these episodes he interviews a figure from the world of cycling during a cycle ride and "cafe stop". He also hosts a popular podcast in which he interviews figures from the world of cycling.

== Major results ==
1987
1st Overall Junior Tour of Wales
1988
1st Overall Junior Tour of Wales
1st Overall National Junior Road Series
1989
1st Hessen Rundfahrt
1993
1st Overall Tour of the Peak
1994
3rd National Amateur Criterium Championships
1995
1st Tom Simpson Memorial
3rd Rás Tailteann
7th Road race, UCI Road World Amateur Championships
1997
3rd Road race, National Road Championships

1998
1st Road race, National Road Championships
2nd Havant International GP
3rd Overall Tour of Greece
1999
1st Tom Simpson Memorial
4th Road race, National Road Championships
2000
2nd Overall Tour of the Cotswolds
4th Overall Tour de Langkawi
4th Road race, National Road Championships
8th Overall Tour Down Under

2001
1st Manx Trophy
3rd Lincoln International GP
3rd Tour of the Peak
2002
2nd Neil Gardner Memorial
2003
3rd Havant International GP
1st Overall Tour of Northumberland

3rd Stage 2

2006
1st Worcester St Johns RR
3rd Overall Tour of the Reservoir
3rd Rydale GP
2007
3rd East Yorkshire Classic Roadrace
2008
4th Grand Prix of Wales
2009
7th Rutland–Melton International CiCLE Classic
2010
2nd Dumfries Bike Fest Grand
9th East Yorkshire Classic

=== Grand Tour general classification results timeline ===
Grand Tour	2000
Giro d'Italia	DNF
Tour de France	—
Vuelta a España	—
