= Julia Shaw (cyclist) =

English racing cyclist (born 1965)

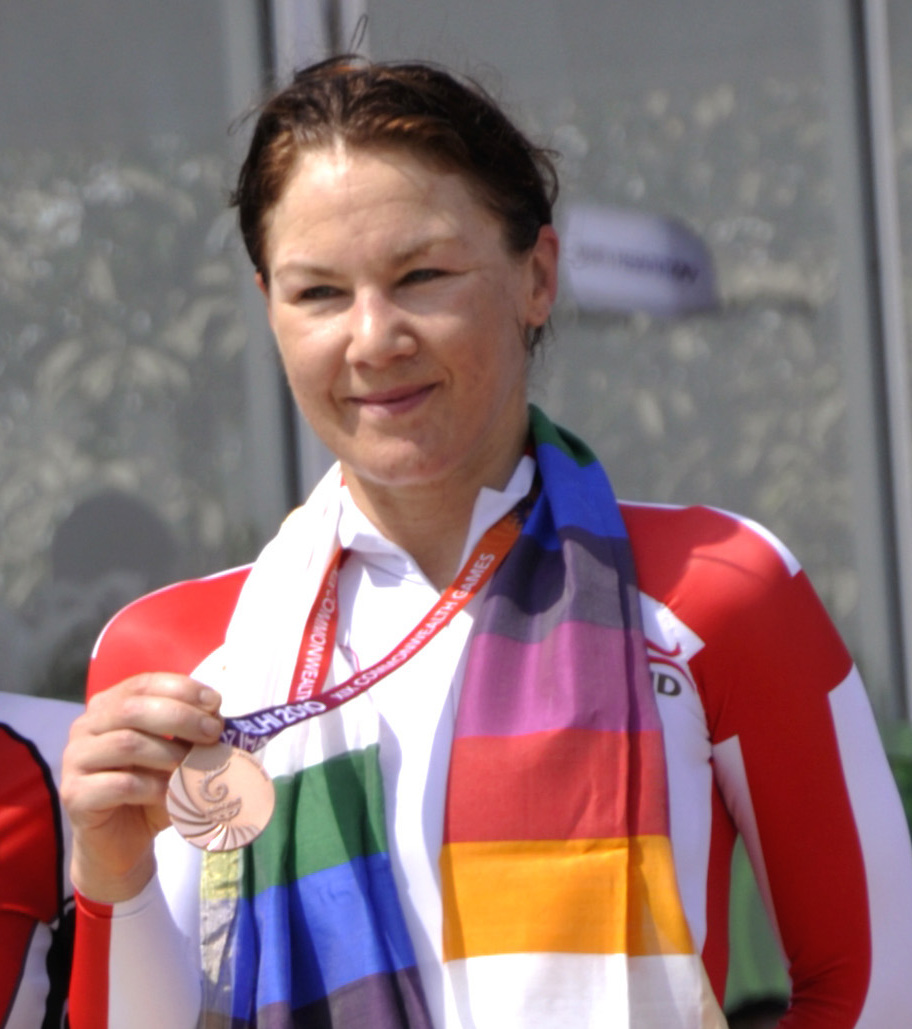

Personal information
- Full name: Julia Shaw
- Born: 28 July 1965 (age 61) Wirral, England, United Kingdom

Cycling career
- Sport: Cycling
- Discipline: Road
- Role: Rider
- Rider type: Time Triallist
Medal record
Women's road cycling
Representing Great Britain
Commonwealth Games
Bronze medal – third place	2010 Delhi	Road time trial

Julia Shaw (born 28 July 1965) is an English racing cyclist specialising in the individual time trial, currently riding for the drag2zero.com cycling team.

She was won multiple British national championships, the British Best All-Rounder competition four times and, in 2010, won a bronze medal in the Women's road time trial event at the Commonwealth Games in Delhi.

== Biography ==
=== Early life ===
Shaw was born on The Wirral in the North West England. She attended the University of Essex gaining a degree in physics. She then took a master's degree.

=== Outside cycling ===
Shaw works as a research scientist specialising in fibre optics.

She now lives in Hampshire.

== Cycling career ==
=== Taking up cycling ===
Shaw says that she did no kind of sport until her twenties, and it was ten years after that before she got seriously into cycling.

I didn't do any sport outside school, and I certainly didn't do any at university. Eventually though, I got into triathlon when I started work, because a guy I worked with did them and he seemed to be having a lot of fun. The triathletes I met were such nice people I just sort of got hooked.

=== International honours ===
In 2008, she won the World Masters Championship Time Trial Championship (Women age 40-44) at St. Johann in Tirol.

British Cycling did not consider Shaw for selection to the 2006 Commonwealth Games. In 2010, she won a Silver medal in the British National Time Trial Championships behind Emma Pooley, meeting the standard laid down by BC for selection. She was added to the team and won a Bronze medal in the Women's road time trial event, 10 seconds behind Gold medallist Tara Whitten of Canada and 5 seconds behind Silver medallist Linda Villumsen of New Zealand.

=== Domestic competition ===
Shaw has won the British Best All-Rounder competition four times between 2006 and 2010. Only Beryl Burton, who won it 25 times in a row, has won it more often. Her winning average speed of 27.451 mph in 2009 was the record until 2016.

She won the Women's British National Time Trial Championships in 2005 and has finished on the podium seven times.

As of 2015 she has won 27 Cycling Time Trials national championships at standard distance.

She is the former British 'competition record' holder for 10 miles with her 2012 time of 19:47.

She broke the competition record for 25 miles with her 2011 time of 50:01.

She has twice broken the competition record for 50 miles, her best being the 2010 time of 1:46:46.

She has twice broken the competition record for 100 miles, currently holding it with her 2010 time of 3:45:22.

She has won the Beryl Burton Trophy, awarded to the CTT's woman Champion of Champions, in 2007, 2008, 2009, 2010, 2011, 2012, 2013 and 2016.

=== Coaching ===
Shaw has worked with coach Auriel Forrester and now works with the exercise physiologist Dr Jamie Pringle. Pringle worked for the English Institute of Sport, a grant funded organisation governed by UK Sport. The English Institute of Sport provides science and medicine support to a wide variety of National Governing Bodies of British Olympic sports.

== Achievements ==
2003
3rd CTT National 10 mile TT Championship
3rd CTT National 50 mile TT Championship
1st (United Kingdom) Duo Normand with Liz Milne
1st World Masters Individual Pursuit (35-39)

2004
3rd CTT National 10 mile TT Championship
3rd CTT National 25 mile TT Championship
1st CTT National 50 mile TT Championship

2005
3rd CTT National 10 mile TT Championship
1st British National Time Trial Championships

2006
2nd CTT National 10 mile TT Championship
2nd CTT National 25 mile TT Championship
1st CTT National 50 mile TT Championship
1st CTT National 100 mile TT Championship
3rd (United Kingdom) British National Time Trial Championships
1st British Best All-Rounder Competition

2007
1st CTT National 10 mile TT Championship
1st CTT National 25 mile TT Championship
1st CTT National 50 mile TT Championship
1st CTT National 100 mile TT Championship
1st British Best All-Rounder Competition
1st Beryl Burton Trophy (Champion of Champions)

2008
1st CTT National 10 mile TT Championship
2nd CTT National 25 mile TT Championship
1st CTT National 50 mile TT Championship
2nd (United Kingdom) British National Time Trial Championships
1st World Masters Individual Time Trial (40-44)
1st Beryl Burton Trophy (Champion of Champions)

2009
1st CTT National 10 mile TT Championship
1st CTT National 25 mile TT Championship
1st CTT National 50 mile TT Championship
1st CTT National 100 mile TT Championship
3rd (United Kingdom) British National Time Trial Championships
1st British Best All-Rounder Competition
1st Beryl Burton Trophy (Champion of Champions)
5th (United Kingdom) British National Road Race Championships
2nd Chrono Champenois – Trophee Europeen, UCI Cat 1.1
3rd Chrono des Nations – Les Herbiers Vendee, UCI Cat 1.1
1st Brompton World Championships
F. T. Bidlake Memorial Plaque

2010
1st CTT National 10 mile TT Championship
1st CTT National 25 mile TT Championship
1st CTT National 50 mile TT Championship
1st CTT National 100 mile TT Championship
2nd (United Kingdom) British National Time Trial Championships
1st British Best All-Rounder Competition
1st Beryl Burton Trophy (Champion of Champions)
3rd (England) Women's road time trial event at the Commonwealth Games
5th Chrono Champenois – Trophee Europeen, UCI Cat 1.1

2011
1st CTT National 10 mile TT Championship
1st CTT National 25 mile TT Championship
1st CTT National 50 mile TT Championship
2nd (United Kingdom) British National Time Trial Championships
8th Chrono Champenois – Trophee Europeen, UCI Cat 1.1
6th Chrono des Nations – Les Herbiers Vendee, UCI Cat 1.1
17th (United Kingdom) UCI Road World Championships Copenhagen, Elite Women's Time Trial
1st Beryl Burton Trophy (Champion of Champions)

2012
1st CTT National 10 mile TT Championship
1st CTT National 25 mile TT Championship
2nd (United Kingdom) British National Time Trial Championships
1st Beryl Burton Trophy (Champion of Champions)
1st Vita Cycles Ten Minutes of Hell Mersey Tunnel Time Trial
1st Brompton World Championships
4th Chrono Champenois – Trophee Europeen, UCI Cat 1.1
5th Celtic Chrono TT, UCI Cat 1.2

2013
1st CTT National 10 mile TT Championship
1st CTT National 25 mile TT Championship
1st CTT National 50 mile TT Championship
1st Beryl Burton Trophy (Champion of Champions)
1st CTT National Circuit TT Championships
10th Chrono des Nations – Les Herbiers Vendee, UCI Cat 1.1

2014
Did not race

2015
1st UCWT Tour of Cambridgeshire Time Trial (UCI)
1st CTT National 50 mile TT Championship
1st (United Kingdom) Duo Normand with Steve Whitewick

2016
2nd CTT National 50 mile TT Championship
3rd CTT National 10 mile TT Championship
1st CTT National Circuit TT Championship
6th (United Kingdom) British National Time Trial Championships
1st Beryl Burton Trophy (Champion of Champions)
