= Lizzie Holden =

British cyclist

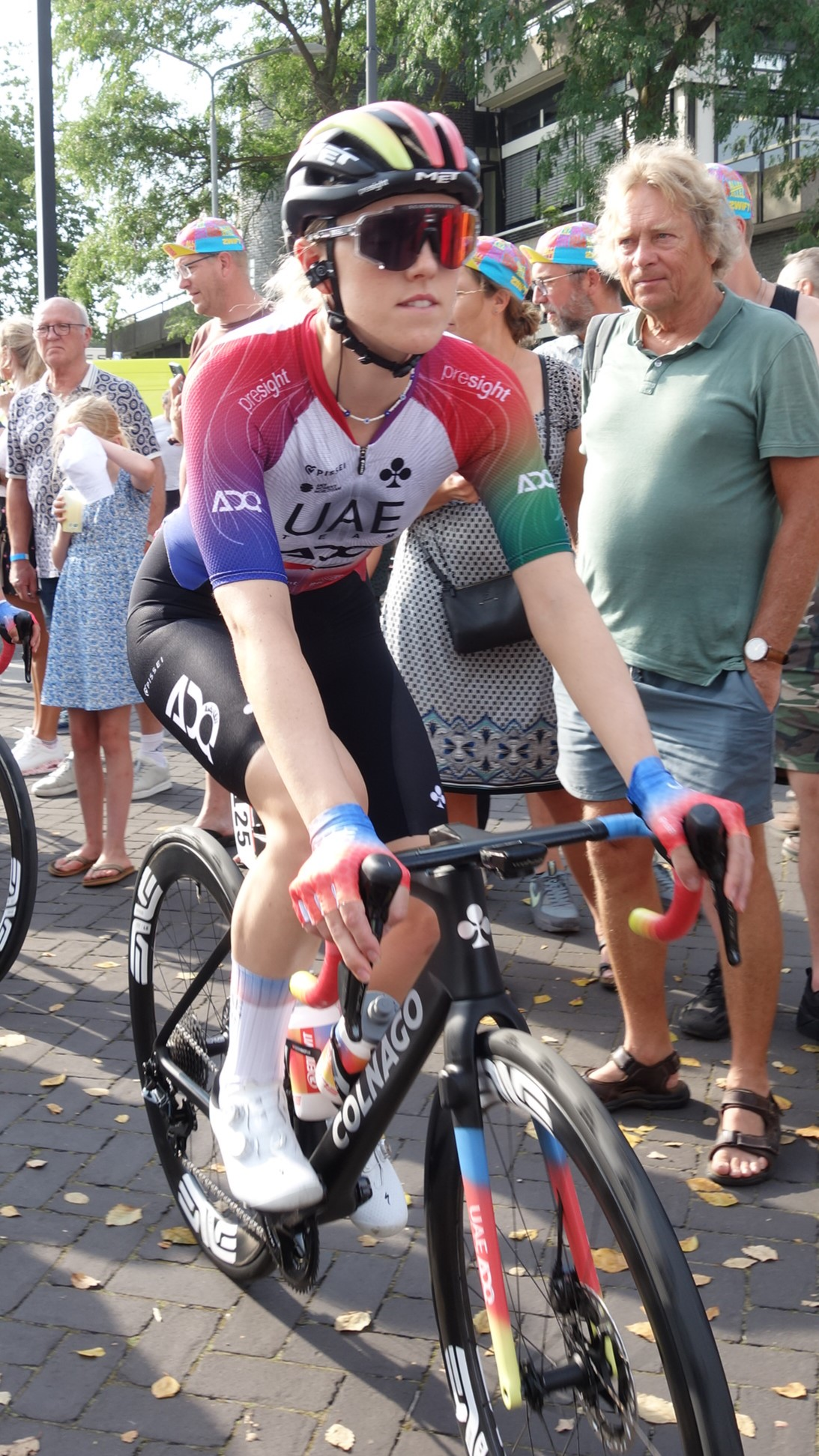
- Holden at the 2024 Tour de France Femmes

Personal information
- Full name: Elizabeth Rose Rebecca Holden
- Born: 12 September 1997 (age 29) Douglas, Isle of Man
- Height: 1.72 m (5 ft 8 in)

Cycling career
- Sport: Cycling
- Current team: UAE Team L'Imad
- Discipline: Road
- Role: Rider

Professional teams
- 2017–2019: Drops
- 2020–2021: Bizkaia–Durango
- 2022: Le Col–Wahoo
- 2023–: UAE Team ADQ

Major wins
- One-day races and Classics National Time Trial Championships (2023)

Elizabeth Rose Rebecca "Lizzie" Holden (born 12 September 1997) is a Manx professional racing cyclist, who currently rides for UCI Women's WorldTeam UAE Team L'Imad. In 2023, Holden won the elite women's time-trial at the British National Road Championships, having finished in third position in 2022.

== Major results ==
2014
2nd Road race, National Junior Road Championships
2019
2nd Time trial, National Under-23 Road Championships
3rd Road race, National Road Championships
6th Overall Giro della Toscana

1st Young rider classification

2020
6th La Périgord Ladies
2022
National Road Championships

3rd Time trial
4th Road race

4th Overall Belgium Tour
7th Overall Thüringen Ladies Tour
9th Overall Bloeizone Fryslân Tour
2023
1st Time trial, National Road Championships
