= British National Time Trial Championships =

British cycling championship

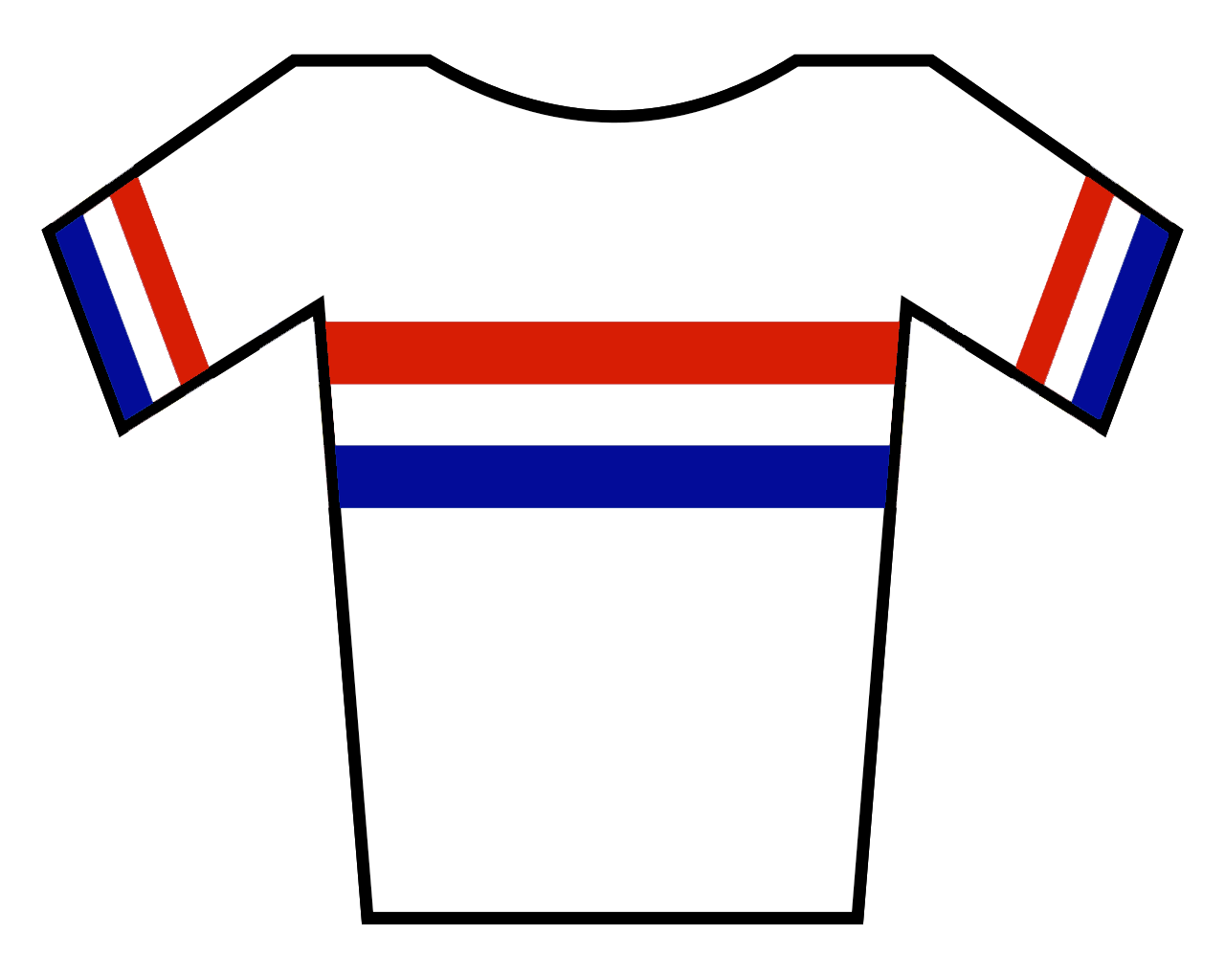
The Champion's Jersey

The British National Time Trial Championships for cycling are held annually. The winners of each event are awarded with a symbolic white cycling jersey featuring blue and red stripes, which can be worn by the rider at other time trial events in the country to show their status as national champion. The champion's stripes can be combined into a sponsored rider's team kit design for this purpose.

== Multiple winners ==
=== Men ===
Wins	Name	Years
6	Stuart Dangerfield	1995, 1996, 1998, 2001, 2003, 2005
6	Alex Dowsett	2011, 2012, 2013, 2015, 2016, 2019
4	Ethan Hayter	2021, 2022, 2025, 2026
3	Michael Hutchinson	2002, 2004, 2008
3	Bradley Wiggins	2009, 2010, 2014
2	Josh Tarling	2023, 2024
2	Chris Newton	1999, 2000

=== Women ===
Wins	Name	Years
4	Wendy Houvenaghel	2003, 2007, 2011, 2012
3	Emma Pooley	2009, 2010, 2014
2	Frances Newstead	2002, 2004
2	Hayley Simmonds	2015, 2016
2	Anna Henderson	2021, 2024
2	Zoe Bäckstedt	2025, 2026

== Men ==
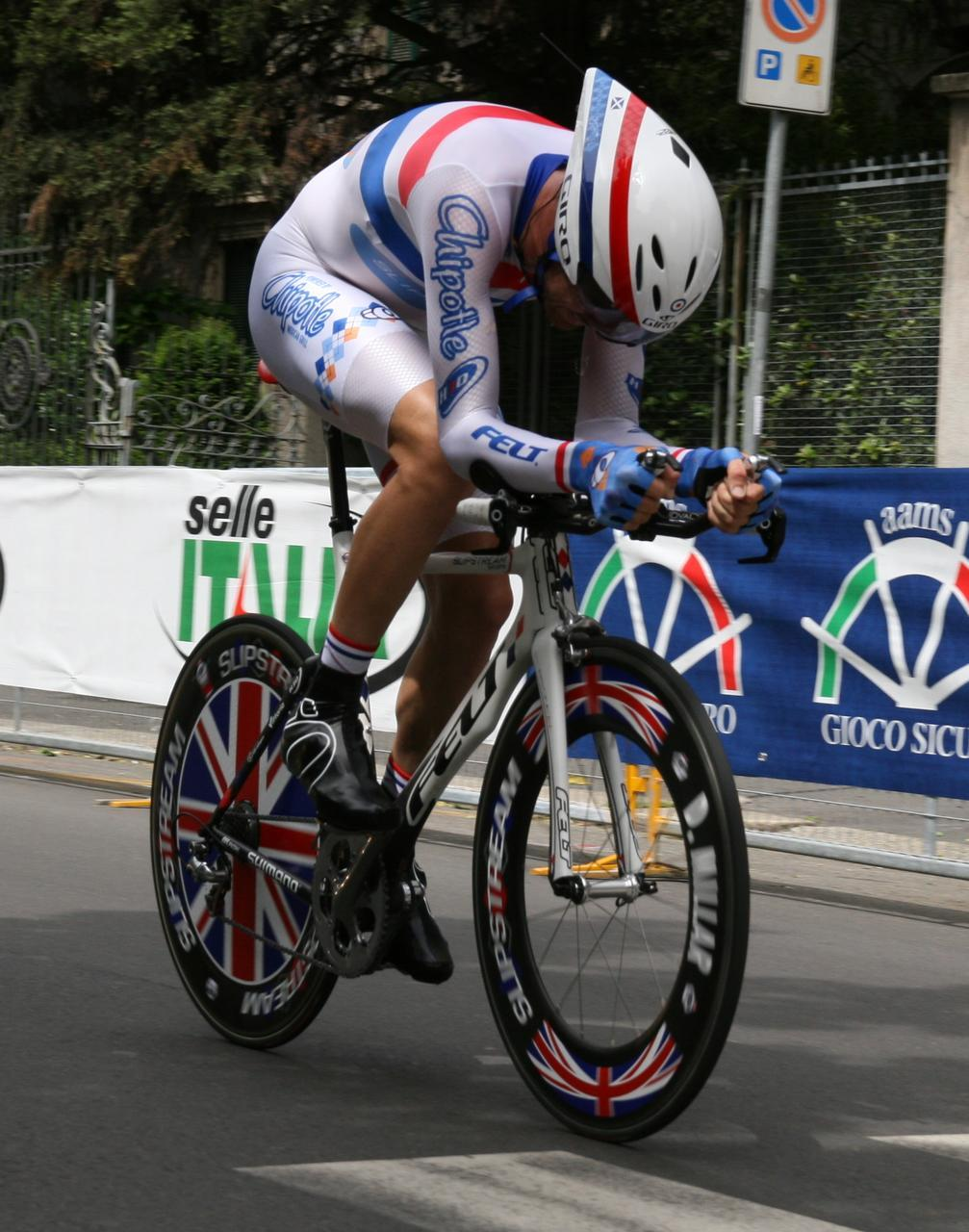
David Millar wearing the National Time Trial Champion's Jersey in 2008

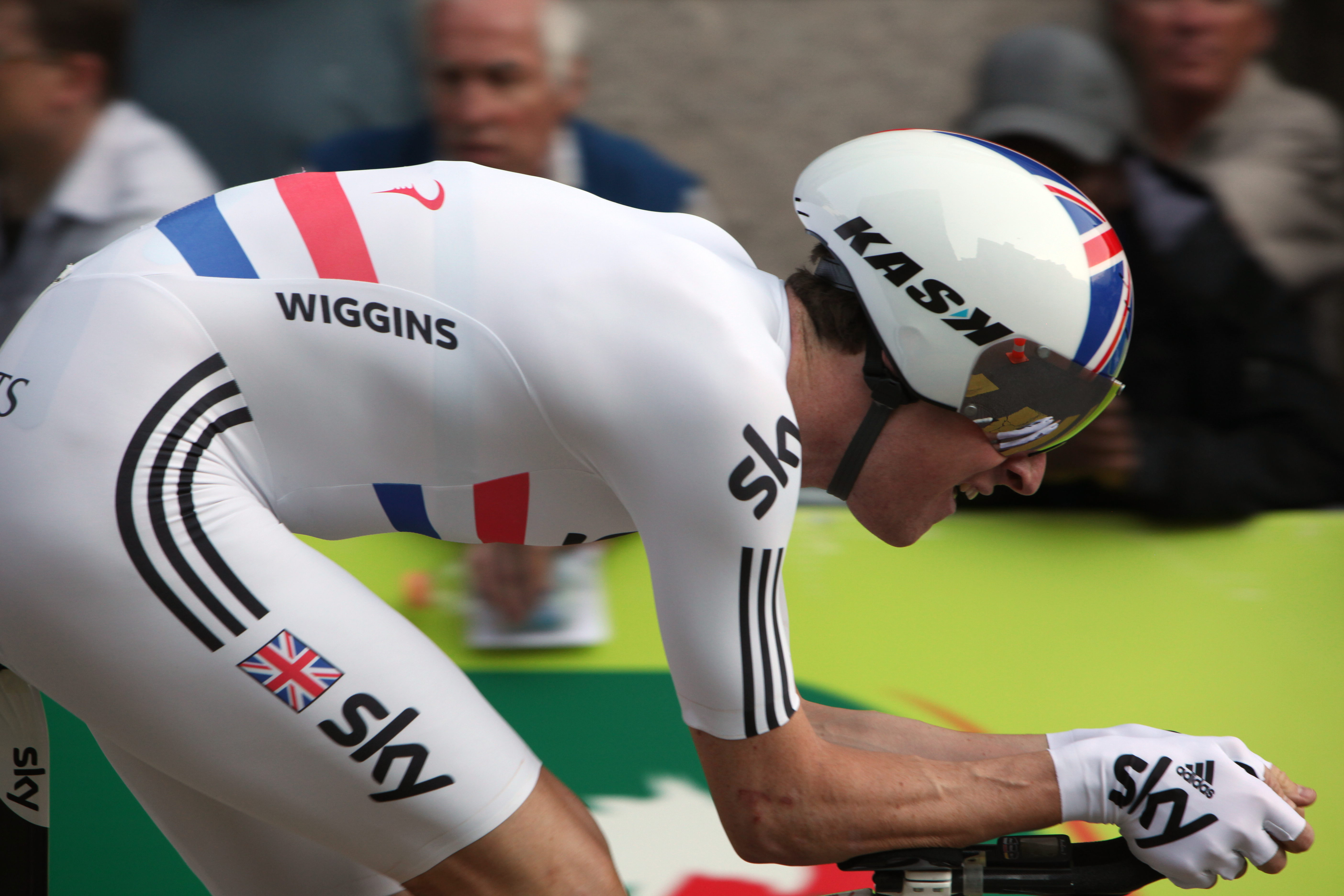
Bradley Wiggins wearing the National Time Trial Champion's Jersey in 2011

=== Elite ===
Year	Gold	Silver	Bronze
1995	Stuart Dangerfield	?	?
1996	Stuart Dangerfield	Jon Clay	?
1997	Graeme Obree	Stuart Dangerfield	Jon Clay
1998	Stuart Dangerfield	David Millar	Tim Buckle
1999	Chris Newton	David Millar	Stuart Dangerfield
2000	Chris Newton	Tim Buckle	Matt Bottrill
2001	Stuart Dangerfield	Michael Hutchinson	Julian Ramsbottom
2002	Michael Hutchinson	Zak Carr	Stuart Dangerfield
2003	Stuart Dangerfield	Julian Winn	Kevin Dawson
2004	Michael Hutchinson	Kevin Dawson	Matt Bottrill
2005	Stuart Dangerfield	Michael Hutchinson	Jonathan Dayus
2006	Jason MacIntyre	Michael Hutchinson	Jonathan Dayus
2007	David Millar	Chris Newton	Michael Hutchinson
2008	Michael Hutchinson	Wouter Sybrandy	Matthew Bottrill
2009	Bradley Wiggins	Michael Hutchinson	Chris Newton
2010	Bradley Wiggins	Chris Froome	Geraint Thomas
2011	Alex Dowsett	Steve Cummings	Matthew Bottrill
2012	Alex Dowsett	Douglas Dewey	Matt Clinton
2013	Alex Dowsett	Matthew Bottrill	Ben Swift
2014	Bradley Wiggins	Geraint Thomas	Alex Dowsett
2015	Alex Dowsett	Edmund Bradbury	Ryan Perry
2016	Alex Dowsett	James Gullen	Ryan Perry
2017	Steve Cummings	Alex Dowsett	James Gullen
2018	Geraint Thomas	Harry Tanfield	Alex Dowsett
2019	Alex Dowsett	John Archibald	Steve Cummings
2020	Cancelled due to the COVID-19 pandemic in the United Kingdom		
2021	Ethan Hayter	Daniel Bigham	James Shaw
2022	Ethan Hayter	Daniel Bigham	James Shaw
2023	Josh Tarling	Fred Wright	Connor Swift
2024	Josh Tarling	Max Walker	Ethan Vernon
2025	Ethan Hayter	Sam Watson	Oliver Knight
2026	Ethan Hayter	Connor Swift	Josh Charlton

=== Under 23 ===
Year	Gold	Silver	Bronze
2004	Ryan Connor	Ben Hallam	Ben Greenwood
2005	Ben Greenwood	Steven Lampier	Peter Russell
2006	Daniel Davies	James Stewart	Dale Appleby
2007	(Republic of Ireland) Matt Brammeier	(Netherlands) Wouter Sybrandy	Daniel Shand
2008	Alex Dowsett	Andrew Griffiths	Daniel Davis
2009	Alex Dowsett	Andy Tennant	Andrew Griffiths
2010	Andrew Griffiths	Matthew Jones	Douglas Dewey
2011	Douglas Dewey	George Atkins	Andrew Griffiths
2012	Sam Harrison	George Atkins	Richard Handley
2013	Sam Harrison	Joseph Perrett	George Atkins
2014	Scott Davies	Owain Doull	Daniel McLay
2015	Scott Davies	Owain Doull	Tao Geoghegan Hart
2016	Scott Davies	Tao Geoghegan Hart	Gabriel Cullaigh
2017	Scott Davies	Tom Baylis	Charlie Tanfield
2018	Charlie Tanfield	Charlie Quarterman	Tom Pidcock
2019	Charlie Quarterman	Ethan Hayter	Ethan Vernon
2020	Cancelled due to the COVID-19 pandemic in the United Kingdom		
2021	Leo Hayter	Ben Turner	Oscar Onley
2022	Leo Hayter	Callum Thornley	Charles Bailey
2023	Josh Charlton	Max Walker	Joshua Golliker
2024	Tomos Pattinson	Ben Wiggins	Joshua Golliker
2025	Callum Thornley	Ben Wiggins	Elliot Rowe
2026	Ben Wiggins	Henry Hobbs	Finlay Tarling

== Women ==
=== Elite ===
Year	Gold	Silver	Bronze
2000	Ceris Gilfillan	Sara Symington	Yvonne McGregor
2001	Yvonne McGregor	Natacha Maes	Sally Ashbridge
2002	Frances Newstead	Emma Davies	Rachel Heal
2003	Wendy Houvenaghel	Katrina Hair	Vicky Pincombe
2004	Frances Newstead	Wendy Houvenaghel	Emma Davies
2005	Julia Shaw	Rachel Heal	Brenda Pennell
2006	Rebecca Romero	Wendy Houvenaghel	Julia Shaw
2007	Wendy Houvenaghel	Caroline Kloiber	Rebecca Romero
2008	Sharon Laws	Julia Shaw	Jessica Allen
2009	Emma Pooley	Wendy Houvenaghel	Julia Shaw
2010	Emma Pooley	Julia Shaw	Wendy Houvenaghel
2011	Wendy Houvenaghel	Julia Shaw	Sarah Storey
2012	Wendy Houvenaghel	Julia Shaw	Emma Trott
2013	Joanna Rowsell	Lizzie Armitstead	Katie Colclough
2014	Emma Pooley	Katie Archibald	Sarah Storey
2015	Hayley Simmonds	Molly Weaver	Sarah Storey
2016	Hayley Simmonds	Claire Rose	Sarah Storey
2017	Claire Rose	Hannah Barnes	Katie Archibald
2018	Hannah Barnes	Alice Barnes	Neah Evans
2019	Alice Barnes	Hayley Simmonds	Hannah Barnes
2020	Cancelled due to the COVID-19 pandemic in the United Kingdom		
2021	Anna Henderson	Joss Lowden	Leah Dixon
2022	Joss Lowden	Leah Dixon	Lizzie Holden
2023	Lizzie Holden	Anna Morris	Elinor Barker
2024	Anna Henderson	Claire Steels	Elinor Barker
2025	Zoe Bäckstedt	Anna Henderson	Pfeiffer Georgi
2026	Zoe Bäckstedt	Anna Morris	Elynor Bäckstedt

=== Under 23 ===
Year	Gold	Silver	Bronze
2017	Anna Christian	Melissa Lowther	Alice Barnes
2018	Melissa Lowther	Anna Henderson	Lizzie Holden
2019	Anna Henderson	Lizzie Holden	Pfeiffer Georgi
2020	Cancelled due to the COVID-19 pandemic in the United Kingdom		
2021	Anna Shackley	Pfeiffer Georgi	Abi Smith
2022	Pfeiffer Georgi	Elynor Bäckstedt	Lucy Gadd
2023	Maddie Leech	Lucy Gadd	Flora Perkins
2024	Josie Nelson	Maddie Leech	Flora Perkins
2025	Millie Couzens	Robyn Clay	Maddie Leech
2026	Erin Boothman	Awen Roberts	Abigail Miller

== See also ==
- British National Road Race Championships
