= Rob Partridge =

British racing cyclist

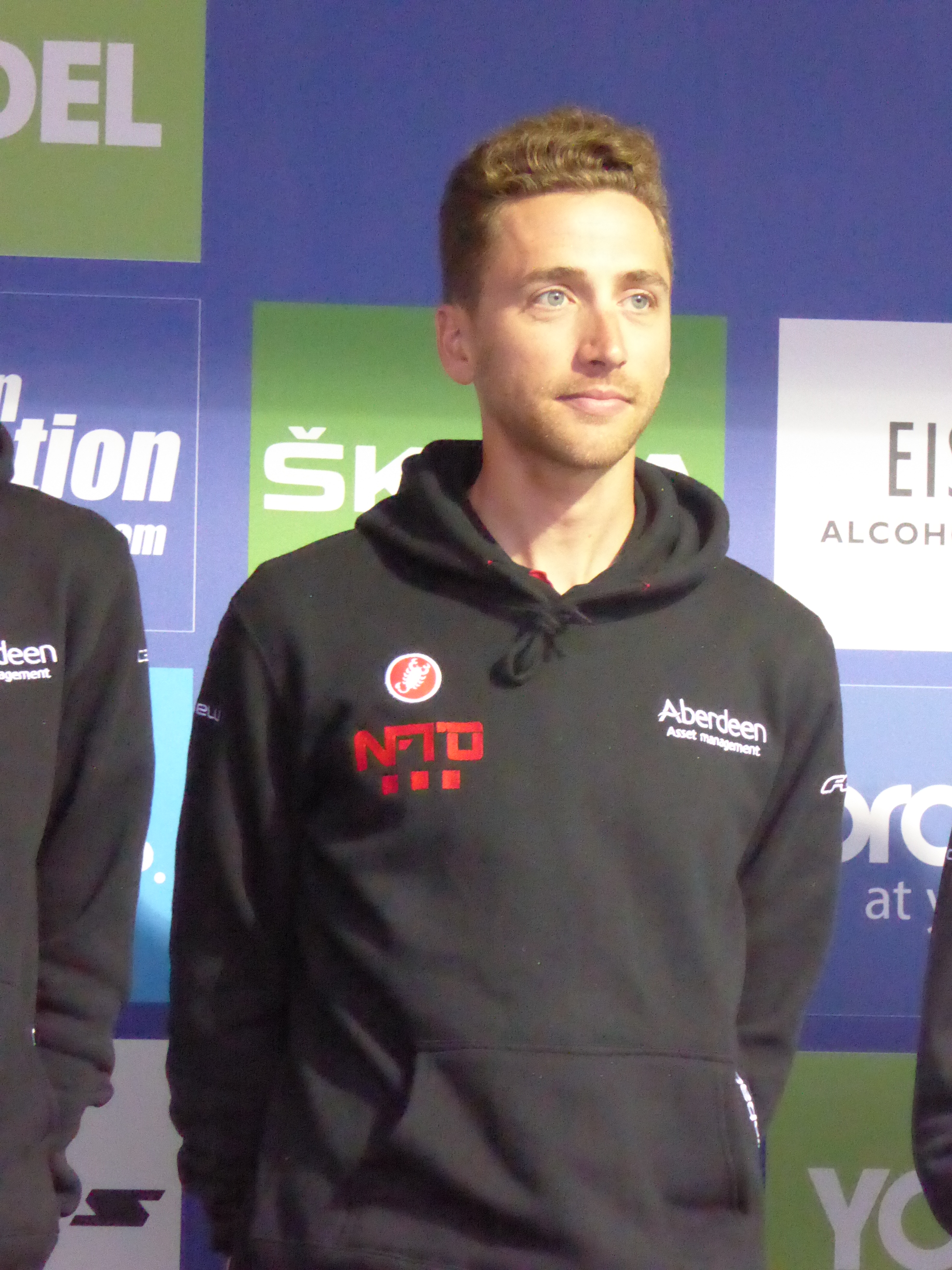

Personal information
- Full name: Robert Lloyd Partridge
- Born: 11 September 1985 (age 41) Wrexham, Wales

Cycling career
- Sport: Cycling
- Current team: Retired
- Discipline: Road
- Role: Rider

Professional teams
- 2006–2008: Recycling.co.uk
- 2009: Team Halfords
- 2010–2012: Endura Racing
- 2013: Team UK Youth
- 2014: Velosure–Giordana
- 2015–2016: NFTO
- 2017: Bike Channel–Canyon

Robert Lloyd Partridge (born 11 September 1985) is a Welsh former professional cyclist from Wrexham, Wales. He represented Wales in the 2006 Commonwealth Games. Inspired after watching the Tour de France on television, he joined the Wrexham Roads Club at an early age. Partridge rode for the Endura Racing team from 2010 to 2012 and rode for the Rapha Condor–Recycling.co.uk team in 2008 and Team Halfords Bikehut in 2009. He was living with the Under 23 GB Squad in Quarrata, Tuscany until June 2007.

He joined Team UK Youth for 2013. When the team folded at the end of the year he moved to Velosure–Giordana for the 2014 season. After one season Partridge was announced as a member of the NFTO squad for the 2015 season.

== Major results ==
2003
1st Corrado GP (National Junior Series Event)
2004
4th Road race, Welsh Road Championships
2005
5th Road race, National Under-23 Road Championships
2006
2nd Overall Girvan Three Day

1st Stage 1

2nd Beaumont Tour
3rd Tour of the South
2007
1st Road race, National Under-23 Road Championships
2nd Tour of Pendle – Premier Calendar Series
3rd Milano – Busseto
2008
1st Road race, Welsh Road Championships
2nd Overall Girvan Three Day

1st Stage 3

3rd Overall Rás Tailteann
4th Overall Bikeline 2 Day
5th Overall Tour of the Reservoir
5th Clayton Velo Spring Classic
2009
1st Road race, Welsh Road Championships
3rd Tour of the Reservoir
9th Warwick Town Centre Race
2010
1st Ryedale Grand Prix
5th East Yorkshire Classic
6th Overall Rás Tailteann
6th Chas Messenger Road Race
8th Overall Tour of Britain
10th Blackpool Nocturne
2011
1st Round 6, Tour Series
7th East Yorkshire Classic
9th Overall Cinturón a Mallorca
2012
1st Mountains classification Tour de Bretagne
9th Overall Tour Doon Hame
2013
2nd Perfs Pedal Race
6th Ryedale Grand Prix
2014
1st Jock Wadley Memorial Road Race
3rd Eddie Soens Memorial
4th Ryedale Grand Prix
7th Road race, National Road Championships
9th Stafford GP
2015
4th Overall Rás Tailteann
5th Betty Pharoah Memorial Legstretchers Road Race
6th Severn Bridge Road Race
10th Grand Prix of Wales
2016
4th Scorpion CS Road Race
5th Severn Bridge Road Race
2017
7th Rad am Ring
