= Koen de Kort =

Dutch road bicycle racer

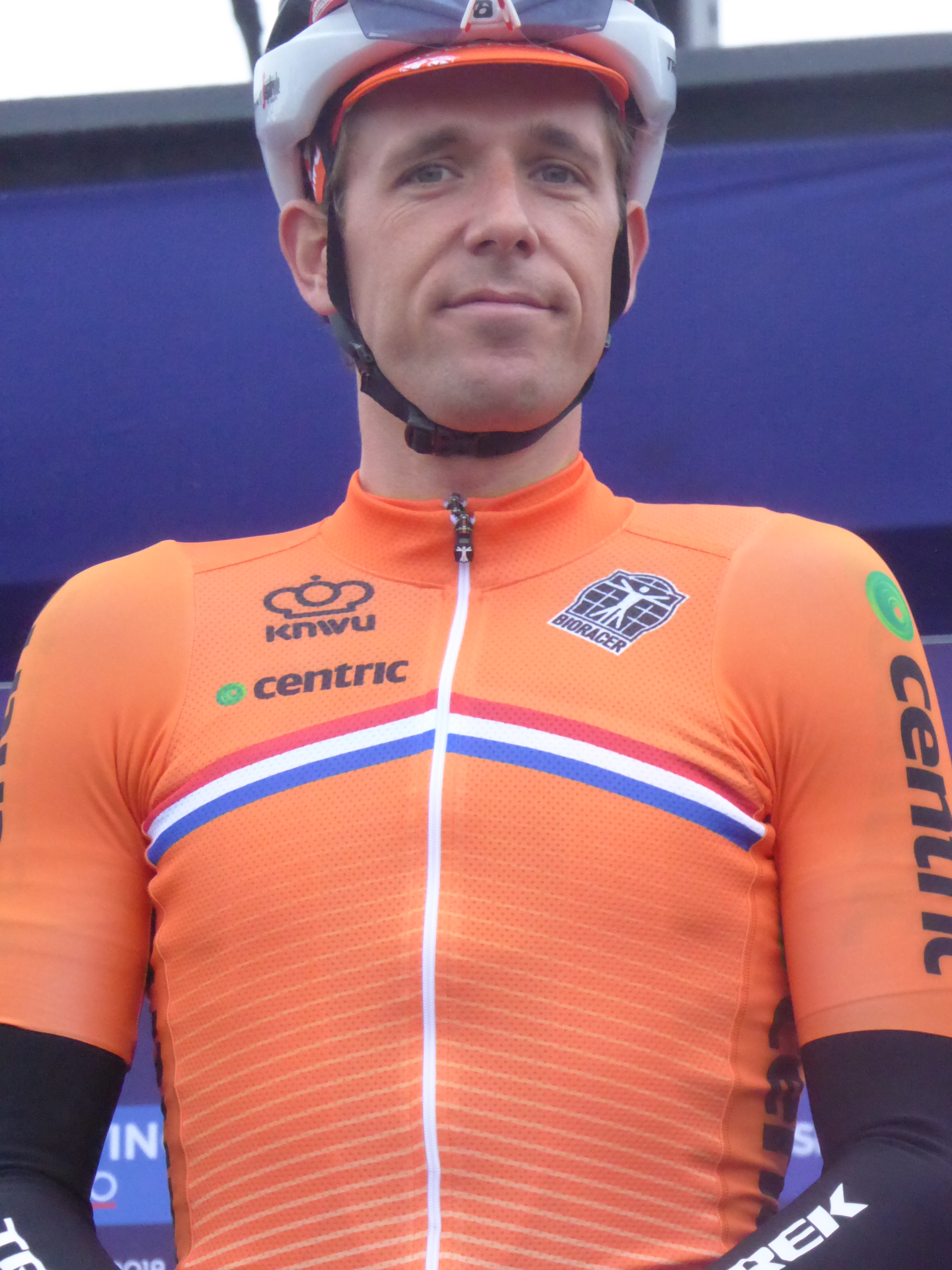
- De Kort at the 2018 European Road Cycling Championships

Personal information
- Full name: Koen de Kort
- Born: 8 September 1982 (age 44) Gouda, Netherlands
- Height: 1.80 m (5 ft 11 in)
- Weight: 70 kg (154 lb; 11 st 0 lb)

Cycling career
- Sport: Cycling
- Current team: Lidl–Trek
- Discipline: Road
- Role: Rider (retired); Team support manager
- Rider type: All-rounder

Professional teams
- 2002–2004: Rabobank GS3
- 2005–2006: Liberty Seguros–Würth
- 2007–2008: Astana
- 2009–2016: Skil–Shimano
- 2017–2021: Trek–Segafredo

Managerial team
- 2021–: Trek–Segafredo

Koen de Kort (born 8 September 1982) is a Dutch former professional cyclist, who competed between 2002 and 2021 for the Rabobank GS3, Astana–Würth, Astana, Team Giant–Alpecin and Trek–Segafredo teams. Since his retirement from racing, De Kort has acted as the team support manager for his last professional team Lidl–Trek.

== Career ==
He was born in Gouda and grew up in Liempde.

=== Rabobank GS3 (2002–2004) ===
From 2002 to 2004, he was in the Rabobank GS3 development team of the Rabobank cycling team. De Kort had a promising amateur career with wins in the Under 23 version of Paris–Roubaix.

=== Liberty Seguros–Würth (2005–2006) ===
In 2005 he became professional with the ProTour team Liberty Seguros–Würth of Manolo Saiz. That year he won a stage in the 2005 Tour de l'Avenir.

=== Astana (2007–2008) ===
In 2007 De Kort joined the Astana team. Following the positive tests for heterologous blood doping by team members Alexander Vinokourov and Andrey Kashechkin, Astana did not have much chance to compete in 2007 and was limited in 2008. Speaking to Dutch media, De Kort expressed his frustrations at not having the chance to compete after being in a similar situation in 2006 with the Liberty Seguros team. In 2008, De Kort finished 5th at Driedaagse van West-Vlaanderen, 12th at the Eneco Tour and 4th at the Ster Elektrotoer.

=== Skil–Shimano (2009–2016) ===
He left Astana at the end of the 2008 season, and joined the Skil–Shimano team. He stayed with the team in 2012, when it rebranded to Argos–Shimano and finished 3rd in Dwars door Vlaanderen as well as 16th in the road race at the UCI Road World Championships. From 2013 to 2016, De Kort was a vital member of the Team Giant–Alpecin squad, representing the team at 7 Grand Tours and 12 Classics.

=== Trek–Segafredo (2017–2021) ===
In 2017, De Kort joined Trek–Segafredo, and was named in the startlist for the Tour de France.

In June 2021, three of the fingers on his right hand were amputated following an accident while driving a vehicle off-road.

== Personal life ==
Prior to becoming a professional cyclist, De Kort studied Human Movement Sciences at Vrije Universiteit Amsterdam, before studying for a master's degree with the Johan Cruyff Institute.

== Major results ==
2000
2nd Overall Tour de l'Abitibi
3rd Time trial, National Junior Road Championships
2002
10th Overall Olympia's Tour
10th Ronde van Overijssel
2003
3rd Overall Olympia's Tour

1st Young rider classification

8th Paris–Roubaix Espoirs
10th Overall Ruban Granitier Breton
2004
1st Overall Ronde van Vlaams-Brabant

1st Stage 1

1st Paris–Roubaix Espoirs
1st Grand Prix Eddy Merckx (with Thomas Dekker)
2nd Under-23 race, National Cyclo-cross Championships
3rd Overall Paris–Corrèze
8th Overall Circuit des Mines

1st Stage 1 (TTT)

8th Overall Olympia's Tour
8th Chrono des Nations U23
2005
1st Stage 4 Tour de l'Avenir
2008
3rd Time trial, National Road Championships
4th Overall Ster Elektrotoer
5th Overall Driedaagse van West-Vlaanderen
2009
1st Suzuka Road Race in Japan
2010
9th Overall Tour of Britain
2011
9th Overall Tour de Wallonie
10th Overall Herald Sun Tour
2012
3rd Dwars door Vlaanderen
7th Overall Ster ZLM Toer
2018
9th Japan Cup

=== Grand Tour general classification results timeline ===
Grand Tour	2006	2007	2008	2009	2010	2011	2012	2013	2014	2015	2016	2017	2018	2019	2020	2021
Giro d'Italia	124	—	—	—	—	—	—	77	—	—	—	—	—	—	—	134
Tour de France	—	—	—	108	—	—	103	138	92	73	—	70	78	125	—	—
/ Vuelta a España	—	—	—	—	—	67	85	—	DNF	64	96	77	—	—	82	—

Legend
—	Did not compete
DNF	Did not finish
