= Wouter Sybrandy =

Dutch cyclist

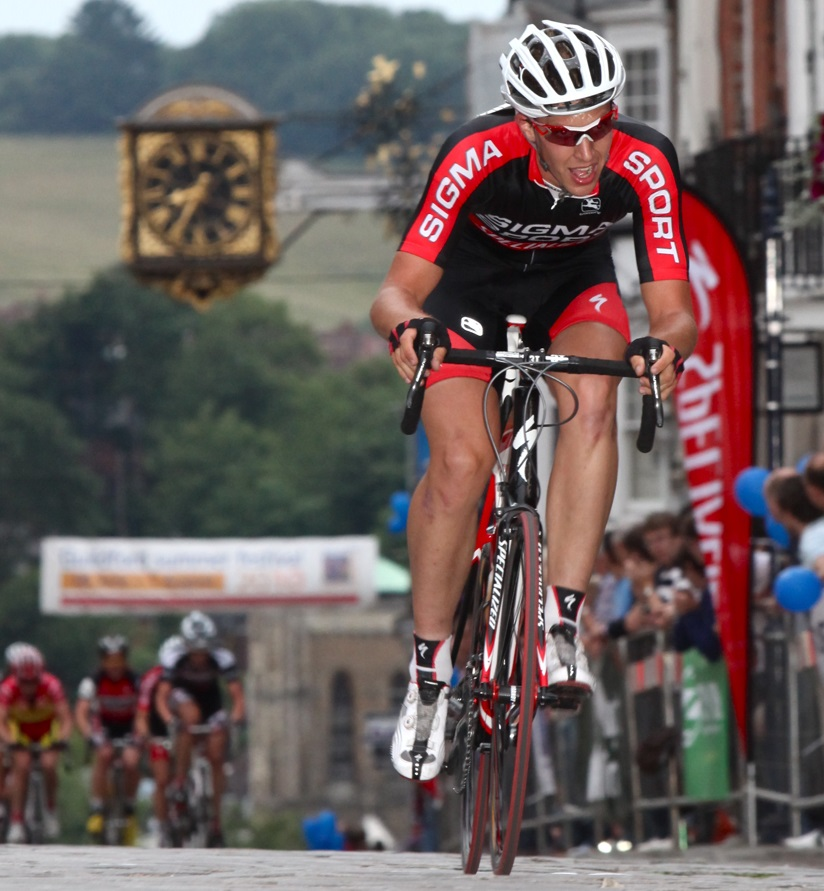
- Sybrandy in 2009

Personal information
- Full name: Wouter Sybrandy
- Born: 20 February 1985 (age 41) The Hague, South Holland, the Netherlands
- Height: 6 ft 3 in (191 cm)

Cycling career
- Sport: Cycling
- Current team: Retired
- Discipline: Road
- Role: Rider

Amateur teams
- 2006: Hounslow & District Wheelers
- 2007: Agiskoviner Cycling Team
- 2008: Team IG–Sigma Sport
- 2010: Lune Racing Cycling Club
- 2014: SigmaSport.co.uk
- 2015–2016: Nuun–Sigma Sport–London
- 2016: Hounslow & District Wheelers
- 2017: UWTC De Volharding

Professional team
- 2009–2013: Sigma Sport–Specialized

Wouter Sybrandy (born 20 February 1985) is a Dutch former professional road racing cyclist, who rode professionally for Team IG–Sigma Sport between 2009 and 2013.

== Biography ==
Sybrandy was born in the Netherlands but spent most of his career in the United Kingdom. Although Dutch, in 2008, he came second in the British National Time Trial Championships to Michael Hutchinson. In 2012, Sybrandy suffered a crash in the Tour of Britain, causing fractures to his cheekbone and eye socket, as well as fractures to three lower vertebrae. When Team IG–Sigma Sport folded at the end of the 2013 season, Sybrandy was left without a team, and decided to return to full-time employment whilst also pursuing his racing career with support from Sigma Sport, the sponsor of his old team. It was announced that Sybrandy would be team leader for the Nuun–Sigma Sport–London team for the 2015 season.

== Major results ==
2007
2nd Time trial, British National Under-23 Road Championships
2008
2nd Time trial, British National Road Championships
2nd Redmon Grand Prix des Gentlemen (with Paul Innes)
2009
1st East Yorkshire Classic Roadrace
5th Time trial, British National Road Championships
2010
1st Redmon Grand Prix des Gentlemen (with Jeff Marshall)
3rd Ryedale Grand Prix
9th Overall Tour of the Reservoir
2011
1st Glade Spring Road Race
9th Overall Rás Tailteann
2012
2nd Overall Tour of Jamtland
7th Overall Tour Doon Hame
7th Rutland–Melton International CiCLE Classic
2013
1st Team time trial, British National Road Championships (with Joe Perrett and Andrew Griffiths)
2014
6th Overall Tour of Al Zubarah
2015
1st Addiscombe CC Open 10 mile TT
9th Chorley Grand Prix
