= Alexandre Blain =

French road bicycle racer (born 1981)

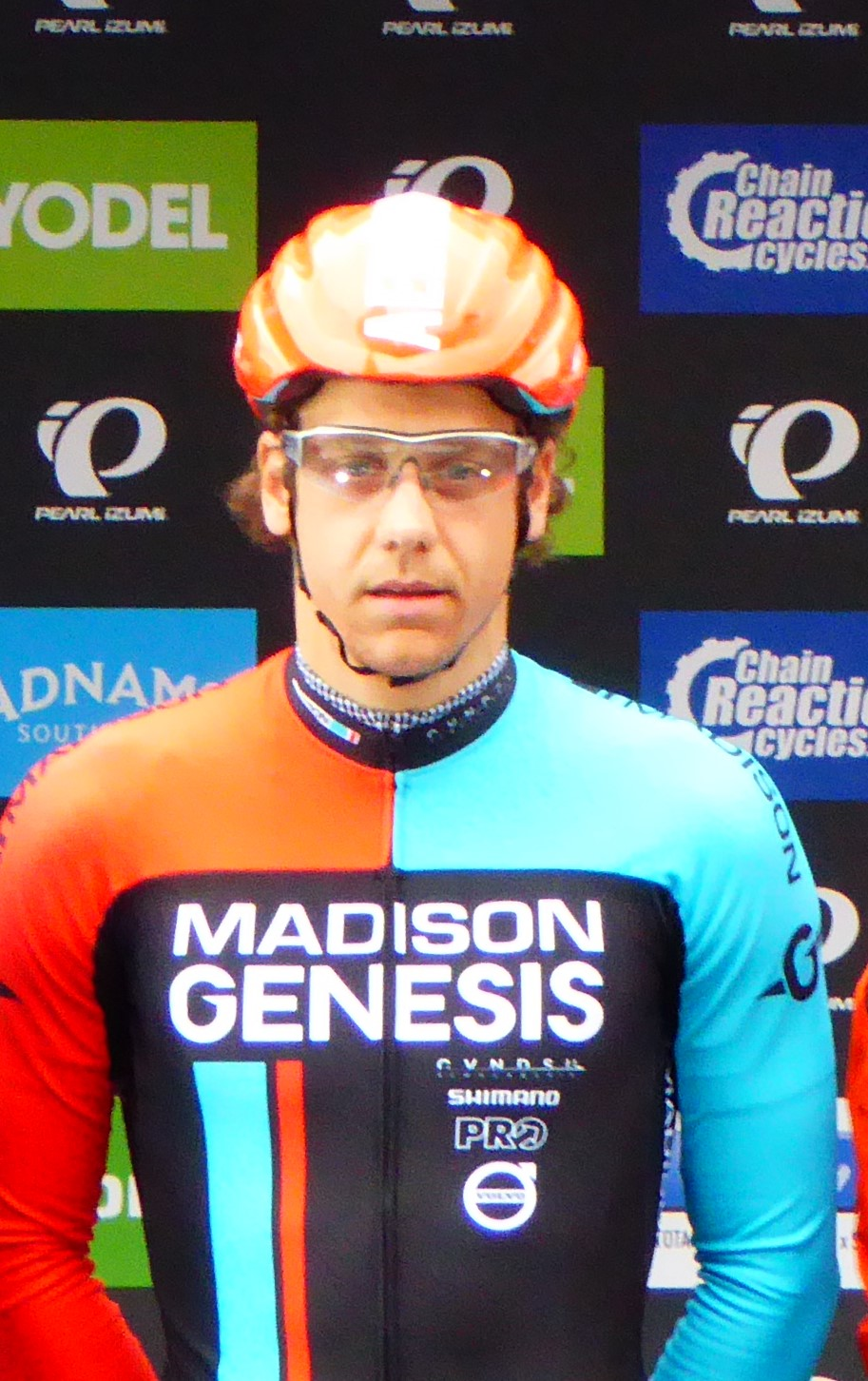
- Blain in 2016

Personal information
- Full name: Alexandre Blain
- Born: 7 March 1981 (age 45) Nice, France

Cycling career
- Sport: Cycling
- Current team: AT85 Pro Cycling
- Discipline: Road
- Role: Rider (retired); Directeur sportif
- Rider type: Classics specialist

Amateur team
- 2018: Team Cycliste Azuréen

Professional teams
- 2008–2009: Cofidis
- 2010–2012: Endura Racing
- 2013–2014: Team Raleigh
- 2015: Team Marseille 13 KTM
- 2016–2017: Madison Genesis

Managerial team
- 2019–: Canyon dhb p/b Bloor Homes

Alexandre Blain (born 7 March 1981) is a French former road bicycle racer, who now works as a directeur sportif for UCI Continental team AT85 Pro Cycling.

He started cycling for his local mountain bike club in his hometown of Peillon in 1997, riding in downhill mountain biking before switching to cross-country. He was a member of UCI ProTeam Cofidis and Continental teams Endura Racing and Team Raleigh. In November 2015 he was announced as a member of the Madison Genesis squad for 2016.

== Major results ==
2005
1st Stage 4 Volta a Lleida
2006
2nd Points race, National Track Championships
2007
1st Overall Tour du Loir-et-Cher
1st Boucles Catalanes
1st Stage 2 Tour de Gironde
1st Stage 5 Ronde de l'Oise
6th Overall Les 3 Jours de Vaucluse
2008
7th Châteauroux Classic
8th Grand Prix de Denain
2010
10th East Midlands International CiCLE Classic
2011
1st Overall Tour de Normandie

1st Stage 7

3rd Tallinn–Tartu GP
6th Paris–Bourges
7th Druivenkoers Overijse
9th Tro-Bro Léon
2012
1st Maldon Dengie Tour
1st Rutland–Melton CiCLE Classic
3rd Overall Mi-Août Bretonne
3rd Beverbeek Classic
4th Omloop van het Waasland
7th Tartu GP
2013
2nd Overall Tour de Normandie

1st Points classification
1st Stage 3

2014
1st Overall British Cycling Elite Circuit Series

5th Otley Grand Prix
5th Stockton Festival of Cycling Criterium
6th Colne Grand Prix
6th Sheffield Grand Prix
8th Beverley Grand Prix

1st Severn Bridge Road Race
4th Circuit of the Fens
5th Stafford GP
7th Eddie Soens Memorial
2015
4th Overall Circuit des Ardennes

1st Stage 3 (TTT)

9th La Roue Tourangelle
2016
1st Round 10 - Portsmouth, Tour Series
5th Beaumont Trophy
7th Rutland–Melton CiCLE Classic
