= Endura Racing =

Team information
- UCI code: EDR
- Registered: United Kingdom
- Founded: 2008
- Disbanded: Merged with Team NetApp for 2013
- Discipline: Road
- Status: UCI Continental
- Bicycles: Giant
- Website: Team home page

Key personnel
- General manager: Brian Smith
- Team manager: Julian Winn

Team name history
- 2009–2012: Endura Racing

Endura Racing (UCI team code: EDR) was a British UCI Continental cycling team.

== History ==
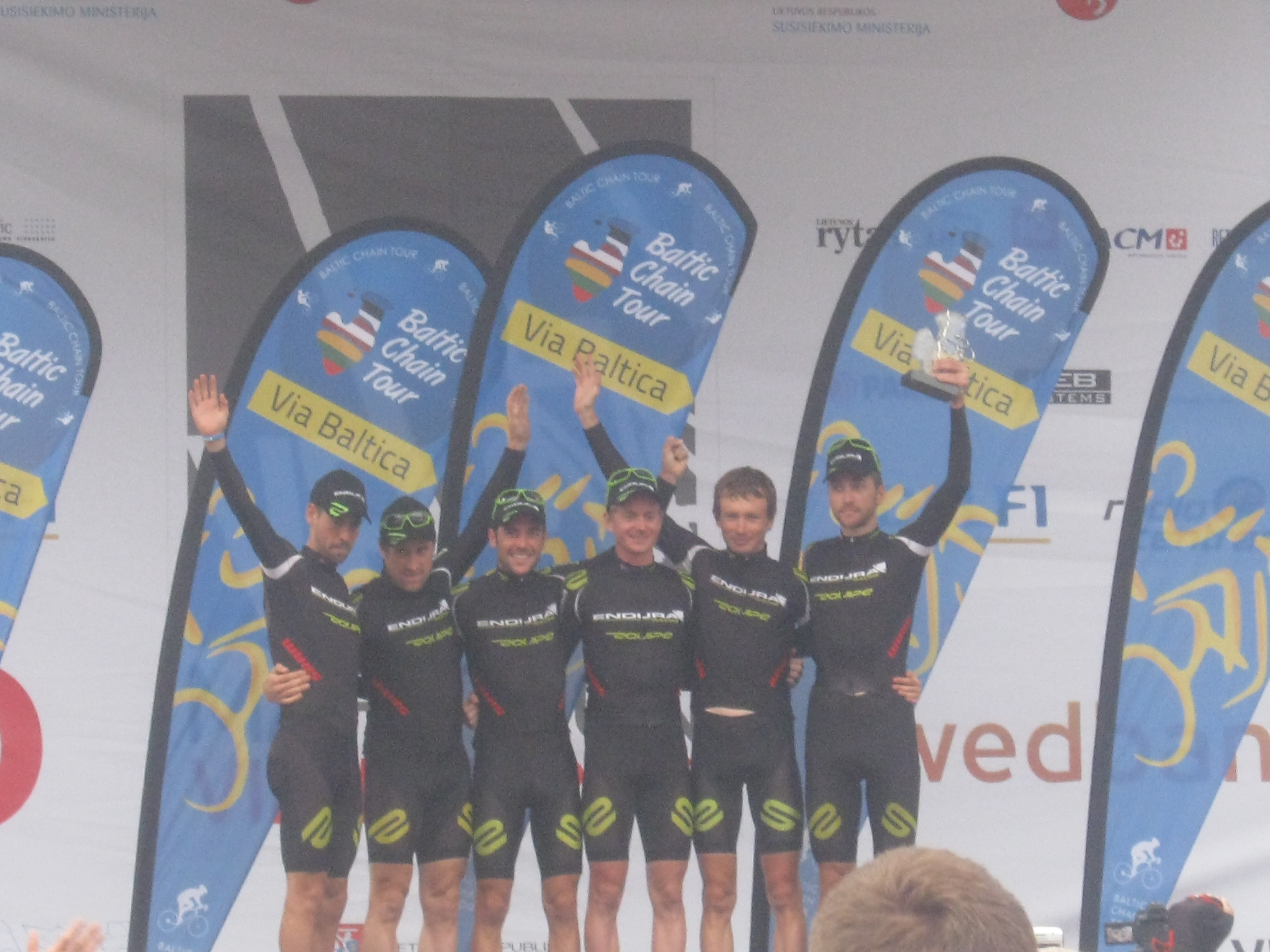
Endura Racing winning Team trophy at the 2012 Baltic Chain Tour

Endura Racing were a UCI Continental licensed professional road racing team owned by Endura, a Scottish cycling clothing company owned by the Pentland Group.

The team rode senior professional events in the UCI Europe Tour and British domestic competitions. The team's UCI Continental status did not allow it to ride in the Grand Tours or UCI World Tour races.

In 2013 the team merged with the German-based Pro Continental team, Team NetApp - becoming Team NetApp-Endura.

== Major wins ==
2011
Overall Tour de Normandie, Alexandre Blain

Stage 7, Alexandre Blain

Overall Cinturón a Mallorca, Iker Camano

Stage 2, Iker Camano

Stage 2 Tour de Bretagne, René Mandri
Stage 4 Tour of Norway, Iker Camano
Stage 1 Czech Cycling Tour, Team Time Trial
Preston Grand Prix, Ian Wilkinson
Stage 2 Tour of Utah, Jack Bauer
Overall Cinturó de l'Empordà, Paul Voss

Stage 1, Paul Voss

2012
Overall Tour Méditerranéen, Jonathan Tiernan-Locke

Stages 1 & 4, Jonathan Tiernan-Locke

Overall Tour du Haut Var, Jonathan Tiernan-Locke

Stage 2, Jonathan Tiernan-Locke

Eddie Soens Memorial Road Race, Russell Downing
Grand Prix de la Ville de Lillers, Russell Downing
Stage 3 Tour de Normandie, Ian Wilkinson
Stage 5 Tour de Normandie, Erick Rowsell
Maldon Dengie Tour, Alexandre Blain
Stage 1 Circuit des Ardennes, Russell Downing
Overall Tour Doon Hame, Jonathan McEvoy

Stage 1, Erick Rowsell
Stage 2, Scott Thwaites
Stage 3, Jonathan McEvoy

Rutland-Melton International CiCLE Classic, Alexandre Blain
Tour of the Reservoir, Scott Thwaites
Lincoln Grand Prix, Russell Downing
Stage 5 Glava Tour of Norway, Russell Downing
Tartu GP, Rene Mandri
British National Circuit Race Championships, Scott Thwaites
Stage 2 Czech Cycling Tour, Zak Dempster
Beaumont Trophy, Russell Downing
Prologue Troféu Joaquim Agostinho, Iker Camaño
Overall Halfords Tour Series:

Tour Series Kirkcaldy

Individual, Scott Thwaites

Tour Series Durham
Tour Series Oxford

Individual, Scott Thwaites

Tour Series Redditch
Tour Series Canary Wharf

Individual, Zak Dempster

Tour Series Colchester
Tour Series Woking

Individual, Zak Dempster

Premier Calendar Road Race Series, Scott Thwaites
Overall Tour Alsace, Jonathan Tiernan-Locke

Stages 2 & 4, Jonathan Tiernan-Locke

Stage 3 Vuelta Ciclista a León, Rene Mandri
Stage 2 Mi-Août Bretonne, Ian Bibby
~~Overall Tour of Britain, Jonathan Tiernan-Locke~~ (Note: In July 2014, Tiernan-Lockes 2012 Tour of Britain Overall victory was stripped as part of his biological violation and 2 year ban)

== 2012 team ==
As of 31 December 2012.

Rider	Date of birth
Jack Anderson (AUS)	2 July 1987 (aged 25)
Ian Bibby (GBR)	20 December 1986 (aged 26)
Alexandre Blain (FRA)	7 March 1981 (aged 31)
Iker Camaño (ESP)	14 March 1979 (aged 33)
Zakkari Dempster (AUS)	27 September 1987 (aged 25)
Russell Downing (GBR)	23 August 1978 (aged 34)
Rene Mandri (EST)	20 January 1984 (aged 28)
Jonathan McEvoy (GBR)	2 August 1989 (aged 23)

Rider	Date of birth
Rob Partridge (GBR)	11 September 1985 (aged 27)
Erick Rowsell (GBR)	29 July 1990 (aged 22)
Scott Thwaites (GBR)	12 February 1990 (aged 22)
Jonathan Tiernan-Locke (GBR)	26 December 1984 (aged 28)
Paul Voss (GER)	26 March 1986 (aged 26)
Alexander Wetterhall (SWE)	12 April 1986 (aged 26)
Ian Wilkinson (GBR)	14 April 1979 (aged 33)
Dean Windsor (AUS)	9 September 1986 (aged 26)
