= Stijn Neirynck =

Belgian cyclist

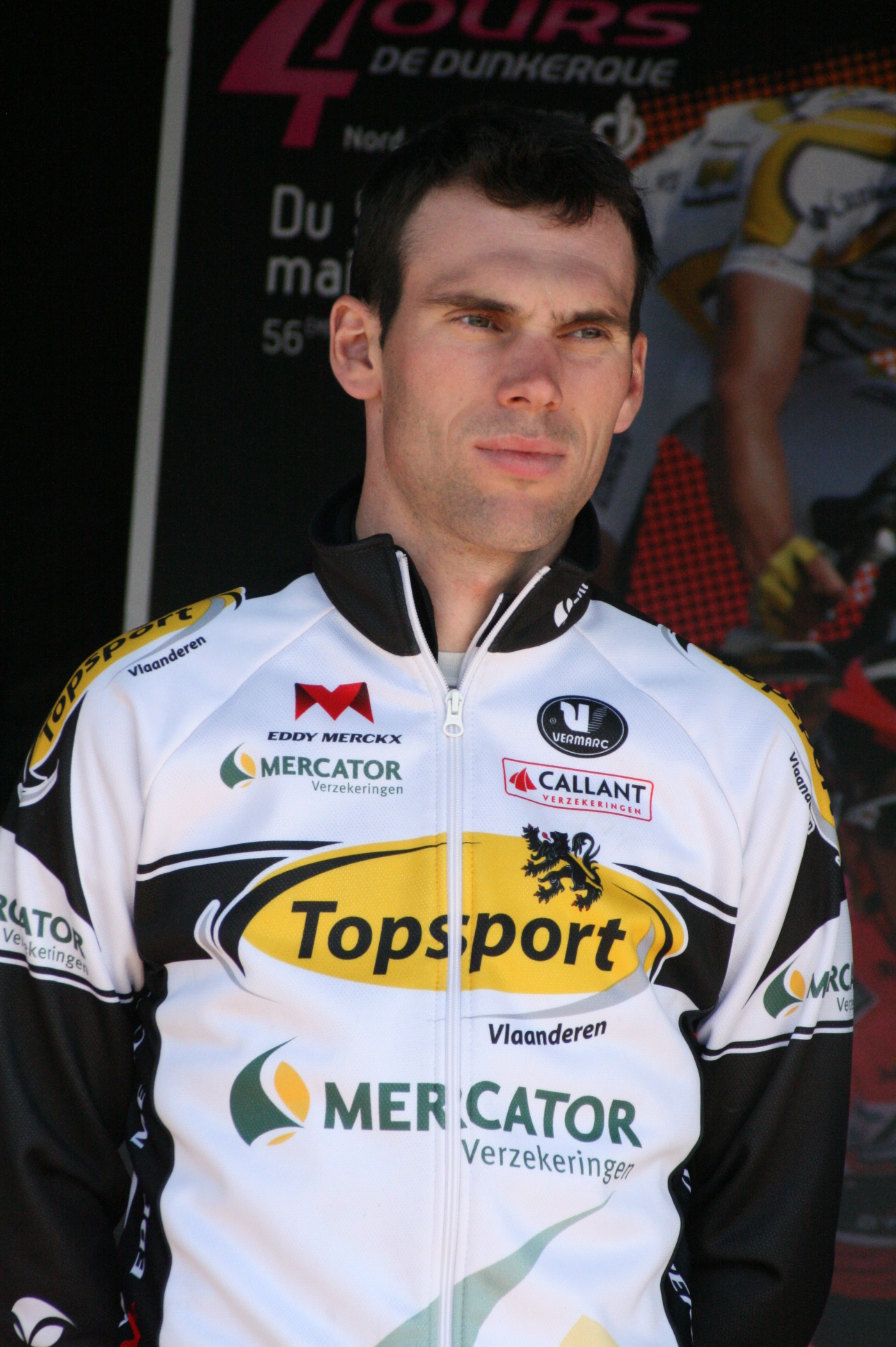

Personal information
- Born: 14 September 1985 (age 41) Tielt, Belgium
- Height: 1.86 m (6 ft 1 in)
- Weight: 78 kg (172 lb)

Cycling career
- Sport: Cycling
- Current team: Retired
- Discipline: Road
- Role: Rider

Professional team
- 2009–2013: Topsport Vlaanderen–Mercator

Stijn Neirynck (born 14 September 1985 in Tielt) is a Belgian former cyclist. He rode for Topsport Vlaanderen–Mercator for his entire career, which his cousin, Yves Lampaert, also rode for.

== Major results ==
2006
3rd Paris–Tours Espoirs
2007
3rd Internationale Wielertrofee Jong Maar Moedig
2008
1st Internationale Wielertrofee Jong Maar Moedig
8th Antwerpse Havenpijl
2011
10th Handzame Classic
2012
2nd Grote Prijs Jef Scherens
5th Ronde van Drenthe
6th Paris–Camembert
10th Overall Eurométropole Tour
