= Sigma Sport (retailer) =

Sigma Sports
- Type: Private company
- Industry: Cycling
- Founded: 1992; 34 years ago in Kingston upon Thames
- Founders: Ian Whittingham and Jason Turner
- Headquarters: Hampton Wick, United Kingdom
- Website: www.sigmasports.com

Sigma Sports is a UK-based retail company that sells bicycles and triathlon equipment.

== History ==
The company was founded by Ian Whittingham and Jason Turner in 1991. Starting out as a small mail-order business operating from a spare bedroom they opened their first cycle store in Hinchley Wood, Surrey on 4 July 1992. They moved to larger premises in Hampton Wick in 1996 after out-growing the original store. After a number of successful years, they were out-growing their premises again and in 2010 they started work on converting an office building into their next store, opening it November 2011. The store has around 6000 square feet of retail space spread over two floors; there is also a third floor which accommodates a large workshop and a bike fitting studio.

Over the years Sigma Sports has been building up its online business which was run from offices and warehousing on an industrial park near Esher. In 2018 Sigma Sports opened an additional 30,000 sq ft warehouse facility in Grantham.

In January 2018 Sigma Sport rebranded to Sigma Sports, adding an "s" to their name. They unveiled their new look brand image in the preceding months and sponsored coverage of Cycling on Eurosport in the United Kingdom to support the brand re-launch in early 2018.

== Products ==
Sigma Sports sells a wide range of sports related products focusing on road bikes, triathlon products, running gear and sports nutrition.

== Cycling teams ==
Sigma Sports traditionally supports domestic amateur cycling teams, and became a sponsor of the Nuun-Sigma Sport-London men's team in 2014. The company previously sponsored the UCI Continental squad Team IG-Sigma Sport until the team folded at the end of 2013.
