= Pieter Ghyllebert =

Belgian cyclist

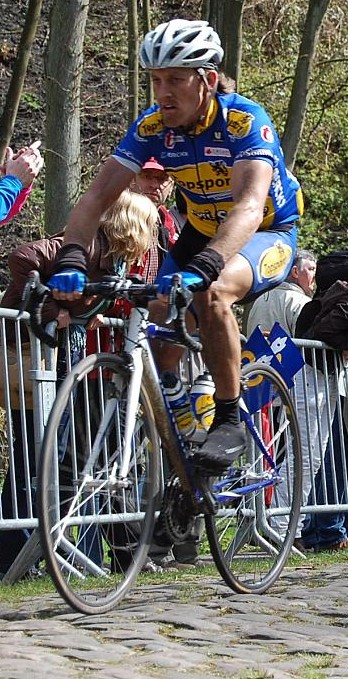
- Pieter Ghyllebert

Personal information
- Full name: Pieter Ghyllebert
- Born: 13 June 1982 (age 44) Ostend, Belgium

Cycling career
- Sport: Cycling
- Current team: An Post–Chain Reaction
- Discipline: Road
- Role: Rider

Amateur teams
- 2003: Firestone De Lombarden
- 2004: Vlaanderen–T Interim (stagiaire)
- 2014: Dovy Keukens-FCC

Professional teams
- 2005–2008: Chocolade Jacques–T Interim
- 2009: Cycling Club Bourgas
- 2010–2013: An Post–Sean Kelly

Pieter Ghyllebert (born 13 June 1982) is a Belgian road bicycle racer who last rode professionally for UCI Continental team An Post–Chain Reaction.

After nine years as a professional, Ghyllebert will return to the amateur ranks in 2014 with Dovy Keukens-FCC.
