= Claire Fraser (cyclist) =

Guyanese cyclist

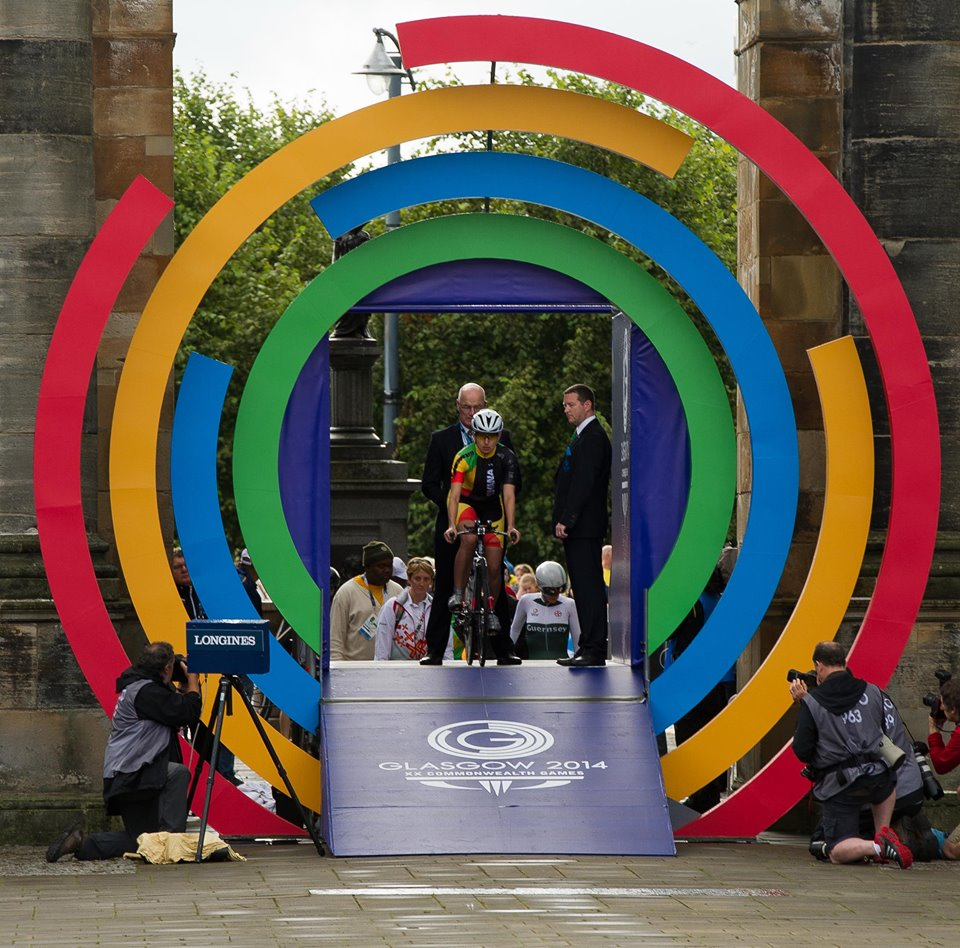
- Fraser at the 2014 Commonwealth Games

Personal information
- Full name: Claire Louise Fraser-Green
- Born: Claire Louise Fraser; 30 June 1978 (age 48) London, United Kingdom

Cycling career
- Sport: Cycling
- Discipline: Road
- Role: Rider

Amateur teams
- 2008–2010: Army Cycling Union
- 2012: Hope Factory Racing
- 2014: Army Cycling Union
- 2016–2017: Stonehenge Triathlon and Road

Major wins
- One-day races and Classics National Time Trial Championships (2012–2018) National Road Race Championships (2012, 2014–2018)

Claire Louise Fraser-Green (née Fraser; born 30 June 1978) is a British-Guyanese road cyclist, who represents Guyana. She is a multiple national champion in both road and time trial disciplines, winning both titles in 2012, 2014, 2015, 2016, 2017 and 2018, as well as the time trial title in 2013.

She represented her nation at the 2010 Commonwealth Games and 2014 Commonwealth Games in Delhi and Glasgow respectively, the 2010 Central American and Caribbean Games in Puerto Rico, the 2011 Pan American Cycling Championships in Colombia and the 2011 UCI Road World Championships. She has also raced for Guyana at the Elite Caribbean Road Cycling Championships in 2009 (Barbados), 2012 (Antigua), 2013 (Curaçao), 2014 (Puerto Rico) and 2016 (Guadeloupe).

Aside from her cycling career, Fraser-Green is a Major in the Royal Artillery of the British Army.
