= Team IG–Sigma Sport =

Team information
- UCI code: IGS
- Registered: United Kingdom
- Founded: 2009
- Disbanded: 2013
- Discipline: Road
- Status: UCI continental
- Bicycles: Specialized
- Website: Team home page

Key personnel
- Team manager: Simon Howes

Team name history
- 2009–2011 2012–2013: Sigma Sport-Specialized (SGS); Team IG–Sigma Sport (IGS)
Team IG–Sigma Sport jersey
Jersey

Team IG–Sigma Sport (UCI team code: IGS) was a British UCI continental cycling team.

== Profile ==
Team IG–Sigma Sport are sponsored by the IG Group, a financial derivatives company, and Sigma Sport, a bicycle and triathlon retailer. The team rode senior professional events in the United Kingdom and Europe, other than the Grand Tours and UCI ProTour races. Sigma sports was directed by Matthew Stephens.

Team IG ended their backing for the team after the 2013 season, and as the team were unable to find a new co-sponsor, they were not able to continue into 2014. However, Sigma Sport pledged to continue to search for a new sponsor in order to return to competition in 2015.

== 2013 team ==
As of 15 January 2013.

Rider	Date of birth
Matt Cronshaw (GBR)	30 December 1988 (age 37)
Ross Edgar (GBR)	3 January 1983 (age 43)
Andrew Griffiths (GBR)	25 January 1989 (age 37)
Jake Hales (GBR)	12 December 1991 (age 34)
Peter Hawkins (IRL)	16 December 1985 (age 40)
Matthew Jones (GBR)	23 November 1989 (age 36)

Rider	Date of birth
James Moss (GBR)	11 February 1985 (age 41)
Ryan Mullen (IRL)	7 August 1994 (age 32)
Joseph Perrett (GBR)	18 March 1991 (age 35)
Wouter Sybrandy (NED)	20 February 1985 (age 41)
Christopher Whorrall (GBR)	2 June 1991 (age 35)
Peter Williams (GBR)	13 December 1986 (age 39)
