= Iker Camaño =

Spanish cyclist

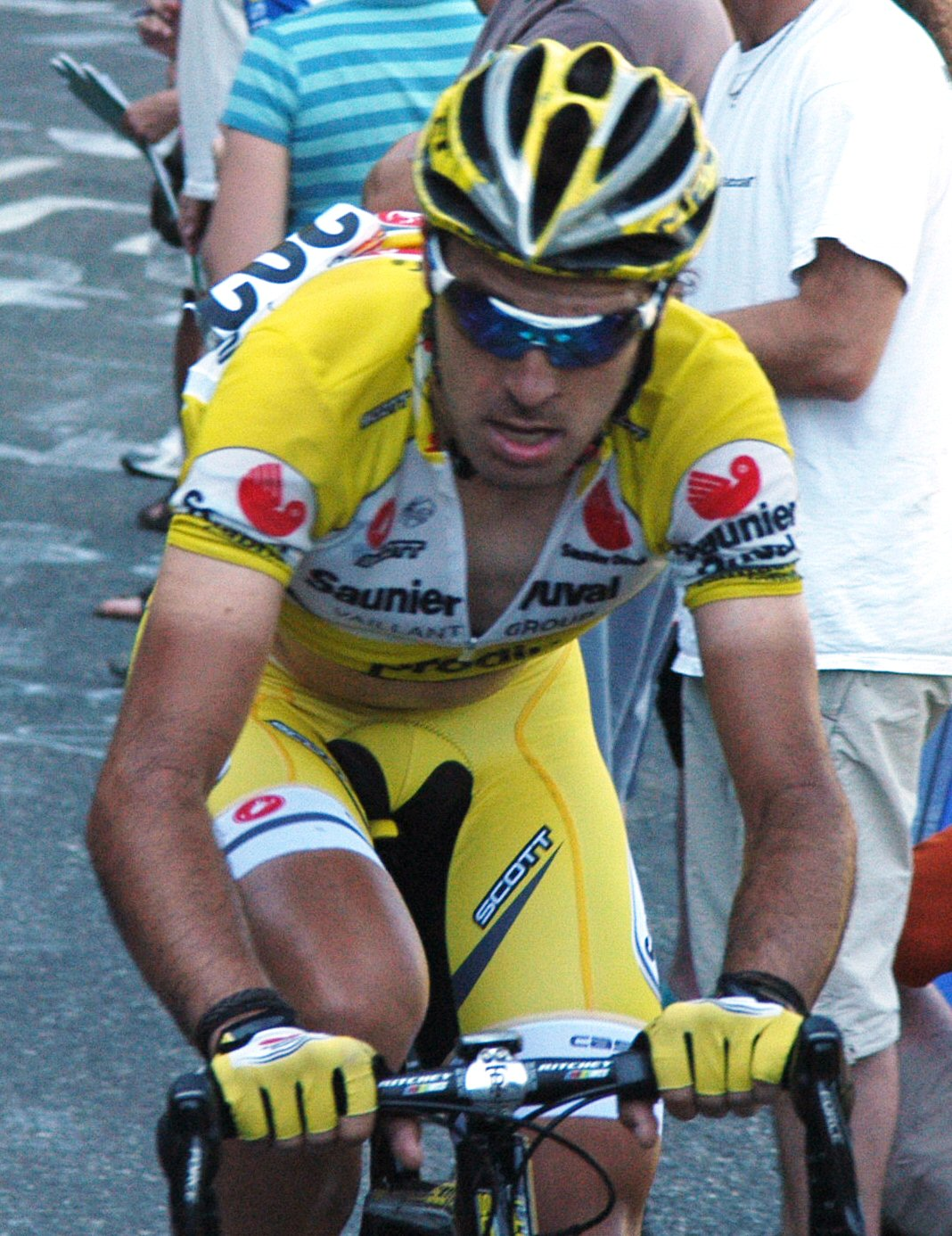
- Camaño at the 2007 Tour de France

Personal information
- Full name: Iker Camaño Ortuzar
- Born: 14 March 1979 (age 47) Santurce-Santurtzi, Spain
- Height: 1.84 m (6 ft 0 in)
- Weight: 68 kg (150 lb)

Cycling career
- Sport: Cycling
- Current team: Retired
- Discipline: Road
- Role: Rider
- Rider type: Time Trialist

Professional teams
- 2002–2003: Phonak
- 2004–2006: Euskaltel–Euskadi
- 2007–2009: Saunier Duval–Prodir
- 2010–2012: Endura Racing
- 2013–2014: NetApp–Endura

Iker Camaño Ortuzar (born 14 March 1979 in Santurce-Santurtzi, Spain) is a retired Spanish professional road bicycle racer who last rode for UCI Professional Continental NetApp–Endura. He was part of Endura Racing from 2010 to 2012. Camaño turned professional in 2002 with Phonak and moved to Euskaltel–Euskadi in 2004, but did not record any professional victories until 2011. Camaño followed Basque star Iban Mayo from Euskaltel to Saunier Duval, who subsequently became Fuji-Servetto.

== Major results ==
2008
3rd Overall Vuelta Chihuahua Internacional

1st Stage 4

2011
1st Overall Cinturón Ciclista a Mallorca

1st Stage 2

1st Stage 4 Tour of Norway
2012
2nd Overall Troféu Joaquim Agostinho

1st Prologue
