= 2012 Tour of Britain =

2012 UCI Europe Tour
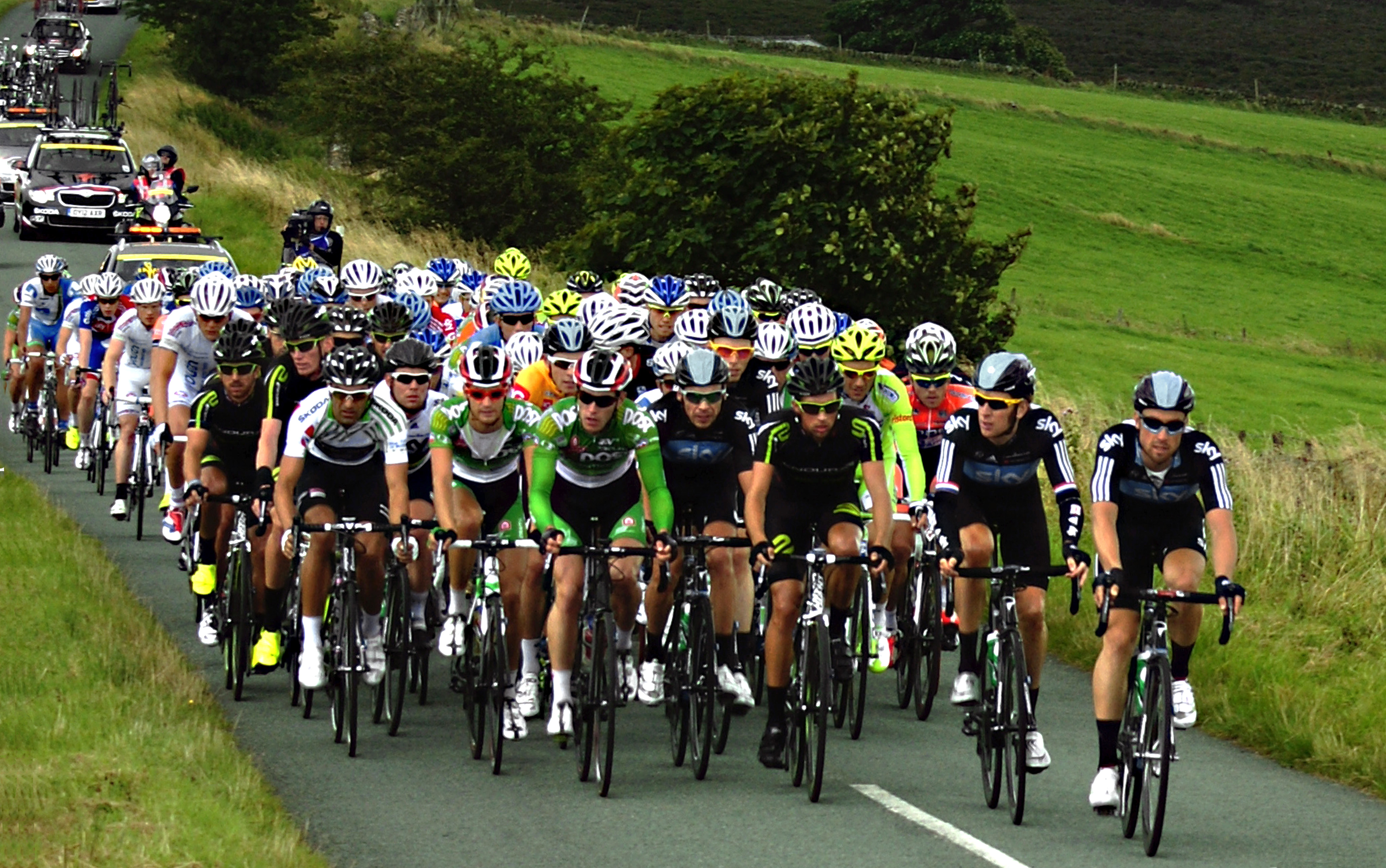

Race details
- Dates: 9–16 September 2012
- Stages: 8
- Distance: 1,347.4 km (837.2 mi)
- Winning time: 33h 11' 22"

Results
Jersey awarded to the overall winner	Winner	Nathan Haas (Australia)	(Garmin–Sharp)
	Second	Damiano Caruso (Italy)	(Liquigas–Cannondale)
	Third	Leigh Howard (Australia)	(Orica–GreenEDGE)
Jersey awarded to the points classification winner	Points	Boy Van Poppel (Netherlands)	(UnitedHealthcare)
Jersey awarded to the mountains classification winner	Mountains	Kristian House (Great Britain)	(Rapha Condor–Sharp)
Jersey awarded to the sprints classification winner	Sprints	Peter Williams (Great Britain)	(Node 4–Giordana Racing)
	Team	Saur–Sojasun	

The 2012 Tour of Britain was the ninth running of the current Tour of Britain and the 73rd British tour in total. The race consisted of eight stages, starting on 9 September in Ipswich, and finishing on 16 September in Guildford. The race was part of the 2012 UCI Europe Tour, and was categorised by the UCI as a 2.1 category race.

The race was originally won by Endura Racing rider Jonathan Tiernan-Locke, who became the first British rider to win the race in its current guise and the first to win a British tour since Chris Lillywhite won the 1993 Milk Race. Tiernan-Locke assumed the race lead with a second-place finish on the sixth stage and maintained the lead until the end of the race. He won by eighteen seconds ahead of Australia's Nathan Haas, who rode for the Garmin–Sharp squad, and the podium was rounded out by Liquigas–Cannondale's Damiano Caruso, who finished five seconds behind Haas and twenty-three seconds in arrears of Tiernan-Locke. In 2014 however, following investigation for biological passport irregularities, Tiernan-Locke was banned for two years and stripped of his 2012 victory.

In the race's other classifications, UnitedHealthcare rider Boy Van Poppel won the points classification for the most consistent finisher in each of the stages; despite not winning any stages, Van Poppel placed four times inside the top three placings of a stage. The mountains classification was won by a Rapha Condor–Sharp rider for the second year in succession, as Kristian House succeeded Tiernan-Locke as the winner; the sprints classification was won by Peter Williams of the Node 4–Giordana Racing team, while Saur–Sojasun won the teams classification.

== Teams ==
The winner of the 2012 Tour de France, Bradley Wiggins, participated in the race, alongside 2011 World Champion Mark Cavendish for Team Sky. Two-time Giro d'Italia winner Ivan Basso also contested the race for Liquigas–Cannondale – the squad making their debut in the race – and Samuel Sánchez also competed in the race for the first time as part of the Euskaltel–Euskadi team. Among the domestic teams, Jonathan Tiernan-Locke was the designated leader of the Endura Racing team.

- An Post–Sean Kelly
- Endura Racing
- Euskaltel–Euskadi
- Garmin–Sharp
- Great Britain (national team)
- Team IG–Sigma Sport
- Liquigas–Cannondale
- Team NetApp
- Node 4–Giordana Racing
- Orica–GreenEDGE
- Team Raleigh–GAC
- Rapha Condor–Sharp
- Saur–Sojasun
- Team Sky
- Team UK Youth
- UnitedHealthcare
- Vacansoleil–DCM

== Stages ==
=== Stage 1 ===
9 September 2012 – Ipswich to Royal Norfolk Showground, 203 km (126.1 mi)

The opening stage of the 2012 Tour of Britain was a primarily flat stage, with the first of the Yodel intermediate sprint points coming in the village of Melton, before the first Škoda King of the Mountains climb came in another Suffolk village, in Snape. The second King of the Mountains point came at the village of Westleton, with the second sprint coming in Great Yarmouth. The final sprint was at Coltishall, with the final King of the Mountains climb coming at Swanton Morley; all three climbs during the stage were third-category ascents. A quartet of riders – An Post–Sean Kelly's Niels Wytinck, Rapha Condor–Sharp rider Kristian House, Rony Martias of Saur–Sojasun and Jonathan Clarke, representing the UnitedHealthcare team – made the early breakaway from the field, locking out the top placings at each of the three intermediate sprint points and the three categorised climbs during the stage.

Martias finished first at two of the three sprints, and thus took the race's first sprints jersey, while House earned the polka-dot jersey for heading the mountains classification, and Wytinck earned the award for the day's most combative rider. The breakaway, which had an advantage of seven minutes over the field at one point during the stage, was caught with around 10 km (6.2 mi) remaining, which was expected set up a sprint finish at the Royal Norfolk Showground. However, a large crash with around 2 km (1.2 mi) remaining delayed a large portion of the peloton, leaving few riders to contest the final sprint; Team Sky rider Luke Rowe prevailed to take his first professional victory ahead of Clarke's team-mate Boy Van Poppel and Endura Racing's Russell Downing. Rowe took the first leader's jersey by three seconds ahead of Martias, who was sixth on the stage but moved up due to bonus seconds from the intermediate sprints.

Stage 1 result

	Rider	Team	Time
1	Luke Rowe (GBR)	Team Sky	4h 51' 05"
2	Boy Van Poppel (NED)	UnitedHealthcare	s.t.
3	Russell Downing (GBR)	Endura Racing	s.t.
4	Jérémie Galland (FRA)	Saur–Sojasun	s.t.
5	Peter Hawkins (IRL)	Team IG–Sigma Sport	s.t.
6	Rony Martias (FRA)	Saur–Sojasun	s.t.
7	Barry Markus (NED)	Vacansoleil–DCM	s.t.
8	Paolo Longo Borghini (ITA)	Liquigas–Cannondale	s.t.
DSQ	~~Jonathan Tiernan-Locke (GBR)~~	Endura Racing	s.t.
10	Ben Grenda (AUS)	Rapha Condor–Sharp	s.t.

General Classification after Stage 1

	Rider	Team	Time
1	Luke Rowe (GBR)	Team Sky	4h 50' 55"
2	Rony Martias (FRA)	Saur–Sojasun	+ 3"
3	Boy Van Poppel (NED)	UnitedHealthcare	+ 4"
4	Russell Downing (GBR)	Endura Racing	+ 6"
5	Jérémie Galland (FRA)	Saur–Sojasun	+ 10"
6	Peter Hawkins (IRL)	Team IG–Sigma Sport	+ 10"
7	Barry Markus (NED)	Vacansoleil–DCM	+ 10"
8	Paolo Longo Borghini (ITA)	Liquigas–Cannondale	+ 10"
DSQ	~~Jonathan Tiernan-Locke (GBR)~~	Endura Racing	+ 10"
10	Ben Grenda (AUS)	Rapha Condor–Sharp	+ 10"

=== Stage 2 ===
10 September 2012 – Nottingham to Knowsley Safari Park, 180.7 km (112.3 mi)

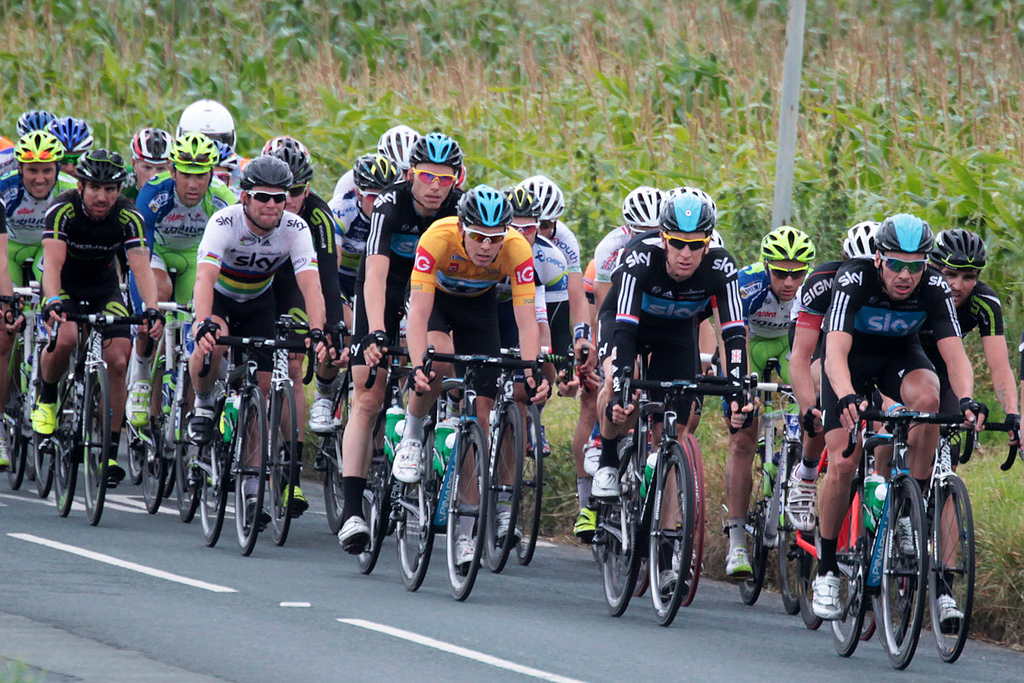
The peloton, being led by Team Sky, during the stage. Race leader Luke Rowe – in the gold jersey – lost the jersey post-stage, after a one-second time gap was implemented at the finish.

The first sprint point on the second stage was contested just over 20 km (12.4 mi) into the stage, at Duffield. After the sprint point, there were three successive first-category climbs on the 180.7 km (112.3 mi) parcours, coming at Cross o' th' Hands, Alstonefield and finally Morridge. The two final sprint points were at Chelford and Culcheth with the stage finishing, for the first time, at Knowsley Safari Park on the outskirts of Liverpool. The breakaway for the stage consisted of six riders, and they managed to remain off the front of the field for the majority of the stage. Making up the group were Liquigas–Cannondale stagiaire Matthias Krizek, Jack Bobridge of Orica–GreenEDGE, Peter Williams representing the Node 4–Giordana Racing team, Rapha Condor–Sharp's Richard Handley, Team Raleigh–GAC rider Russell Hampton and Pablo Urtasun for the Euskaltel–Euskadi squad. The sextet managed to establish a lead of over four minutes at one stage on the roads, but were gradually brought back by the peloton, led once again by Team Sky with assistance from Endura Racing; both teams were looking to set up their sprinters Mark Cavendish and Russell Downing respectively.

The leaders managed to remain clear until around 25 km (15.5 mi); Bobridge and Williams resisted capture for another few kilometres, but all was together before the 20 km (12.4 mi) to go banner. There were several late-stage attacks from riders representing the domestic teams, but it was ultimately a sprint finish within the safari park for the stage honours. Team Sky were on the front with race leader Luke Rowe leading out Cavendish, but the pair became separated in the closing stages, allowing Boy Van Poppel (UnitedHealthcare) and Bobridge's team-mate Leigh Howard into space. Howard beat a recovering Cavendish to the line for his first win of the year, while a third place for Van Poppel, compared to a tenth for Rowe – with a one-second time gap – allowed Van Poppel to take the lead in the general and points classifications from Rowe. This was despite Rowe receiving the leader's jersey during the post-stage podium ceremonies.

Stage 2 result

	Rider	Team	Time
1	Leigh Howard (AUS)	Orica–GreenEDGE	4h 31' 09"
2	Mark Cavendish (GBR)	Team Sky	s.t.
3	Boy Van Poppel (NED)	UnitedHealthcare	s.t.
4	Steele Von Hoff (AUS)	Garmin–Sharp	s.t.
5	Russell Downing (GBR)	Endura Racing	s.t.
6	Sep Vanmarcke (BEL)	Garmin–Sharp	s.t.
7	Wesley Kreder (NED)	Vacansoleil–DCM	s.t.
8	Nathan Haas (AUS)	Garmin–Sharp	s.t.
9	Sam Bennett (IRL)	An Post–Sean Kelly	+ 1"
10	Luke Rowe (GBR)	Team Sky	+ 1"

General Classification after Stage 2

	Rider	Team	Time
1	Boy Van Poppel (NED)	UnitedHealthcare	9h 22' 04"
2	Leigh Howard (AUS)	Orica–GreenEDGE	+ 0"
3	Luke Rowe (GBR)	Team Sky	+ 1"
4	Rony Martias (FRA)	Saur–Sojasun	+ 4"
5	Mark Cavendish (GBR)	Team Sky	+ 4"
6	Russell Downing (GBR)	Endura Racing	+ 6"
7	Steele Von Hoff (AUS)	Garmin–Sharp	+ 10"
8	Sep Vanmarcke (BEL)	Garmin–Sharp	+ 10"
9	Nathan Haas (AUS)	Garmin–Sharp	+ 10"
10	Peter Hawkins (IRL)	Team IG–Sigma Sport	+ 11"

=== Stage 3 ===
11 September 2012 – Jedburgh to Dumfries, 152.6 km (94.8 mi)

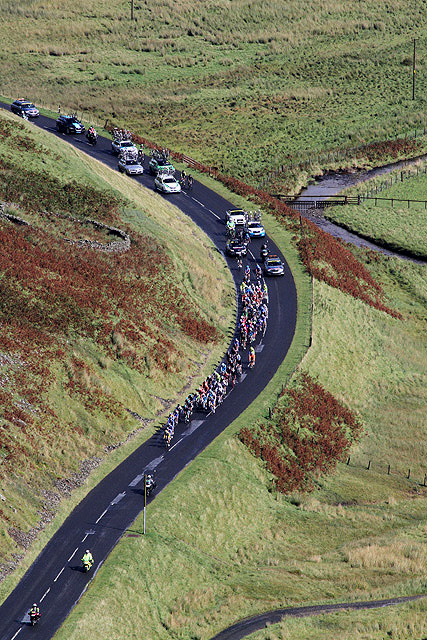
The peloton, around halfway through the stage in the Southern Uplands

The third stage of the race started with an almost immediate sprint point, 10 km (6.2 mi) into the stage at Hawick. Like the second stage, there were three successive King of the Mountain points, with two first-category climbs and a second-category climb coming at Roberton, Turner Cleuch and Grey Mare's Tail respectively. The two final sprints were contested at 107 km (66.5 mi) and 122 km (75.8 mi) respectively, at Lochmaben and Whitesands in Dumfries. Following a finishing loop of around 30 km (18.6 mi) in length, the finish of the stage itself was contested on Whitesands for the second successive year; Mark Cavendish led home HTC–Highroad team-mate Mark Renshaw in a 1–2 finish in the race-opening stage, in 2011.

Five riders were part of the breakaway during the stage; the group consisted of riders mainly from the domestic teams – all bar one of the five – as Bernard Sulzberger of Team Raleigh–GAC was joined by Team IG–Sigma Sport rider Peter Hawkins, Rapha Condor–Sharp's Kristian House and Peter Williams, representing the Node 4–Giordana Racing team, with the group completed by Vacansoleil–DCM stagiaire Wesley Kreder. Williams was looking to defend his lead in the sprints classification, while House was out to regain the lead in the mountains classification, that he had lost the previous day to Euskaltel–Euskadi rider Pablo Urtasun. House ultimately regained his mountains lead with a first and two seconds – both to Sulzberger – while Williams extended his lead with two intermediate sprint wins.

The peloton had given them a maximum advantage of four minutes during the stage, before gradually pulling them back, being led by the UnitedHealthcare team of race leader Boy Van Poppel. Hawkins and Kreder left their breakaway companions behind on the finishing loop around Dumfries, while Garmin–Sharp rider Sep Vanmarcke attacked out of the peloton to join up with the two leaders around 10 km (6.2 mi) later. Hawkins was almost immediately dropped after that, with Kreder and Vanmarcke managing to hold off the peloton until around 2 km (1.2 mi) to go, as the Team Sky and Orica–GreenEDGE had ramped up the pace in the peloton ahead of the sprint finish. With a lead-out from opening stage winner Luke Rowe, Cavendish took victory in Dumfries for the second consecutive year, ahead of Orica–GreenEDGE pairing Leigh Howard and Aidis Kruopis. With six bonus seconds on the line, Howard assumed the overall lead of the race, with Cavendish level on time; Van Poppel fell to third but held on to the lead of the points classification.

Stage 3 result

	Rider	Team	Time
1	Mark Cavendish (GBR)	Team Sky	3h 54' 30"
2	Leigh Howard (AUS)	Orica–GreenEDGE	s.t.
3	Aidis Kruopis (LTU)	Orica–GreenEDGE	s.t.
4	Luke Rowe (GBR)	Team Sky	s.t.
5	Sam Bennett (IRL)	An Post–Sean Kelly	s.t.
6	Russell Downing (GBR)	Endura Racing	s.t.
7	Boy Van Poppel (NED)	UnitedHealthcare	s.t.
8	Jonathan McEvoy (GBR)	Endura Racing	s.t.
9	Barry Markus (NED)	Vacansoleil–DCM	s.t.
10	Yanto Barker (GBR)	Team UK Youth	s.t.

General Classification after Stage 3

	Rider	Team	Time
1	Leigh Howard (AUS)	Orica–GreenEDGE	13h 16' 28"
2	Mark Cavendish (GBR)	Team Sky	+ 0"
3	Boy Van Poppel (NED)	UnitedHealthcare	+ 4"
4	Luke Rowe (GBR)	Team Sky	+ 4"
5	Rony Martias (FRA)	Saur–Sojasun	+ 10"
6	Russell Downing (GBR)	Endura Racing	+ 12"
7	Steele Von Hoff (AUS)	Garmin–Sharp	+ 16"
8	Nathan Haas (AUS)	Garmin–Sharp	+ 16"
9	Sep Vanmarcke (BEL)	Garmin–Sharp	+ 16"
10	Sam Bennett (IRL)	An Post–Sean Kelly	+ 17"

=== Stage 4 ===
12 September 2012 – Carlisle to Blackpool, 156 km (96.9 mi)

The fourth stage of the race started in Carlisle, where two sprints and two King of the Mountain points were all contested within the first 80 km (49.7 mi) of the stage. The first two sprint points were held at Shap and Kendal, interspersed with two-second-category climbs at Shap Fell and Old Hutton. The final sprint of the day was situated at Caton and the final King of the Mountain point of the day was the third-category climb at Quernmore. The stage finished on the Golden Mile in Blackpool, where André Greipel had won the most recent finish there in the race-opening stage in 2010; the stage scheduled to finish in Blackpool in 2011 was cancelled due to inclement weather conditions after the remnants of Hurricane Katia hit the country. The main breakaway of the day was initiated during the opening kilometres of the stage, and involved six riders.

The group – consisting of mountains classification leader Kristian House (Rapha Condor–Sharp), Ronan McLaughlin of An Post–Sean Kelly, Team UK Youth's Niklas Gustavsson, Team IG–Sigma Sport rider Dan Craven, Matt Cronshaw of Node 4–Giordana Racing and David Lelay representing the Saur–Sojasun team – quickly gained an advantage of around seven minutes on the peloton, before they started attacking one another with around 40 km (24.9 mi) remaining. House and Gustavsson were initially dropped, while in the peloton, echelons were formed with 25 km (15.5 mi), reducing the group to twenty-seven riders in depth. McLaughlin and Craven pushed on together off the front, before they were caught with 10 km (6.2 mi) remaining. This ultimately set up a reduced sprint finish, where Team Sky rider Mark Cavendish won for the second day running, ahead of Australian pair Steele Von Hoff (Garmin–Sharp) and race leader Leigh Howard of Orica–GreenEDGE. Cavendish assumed the race lead from Howard by six seconds, having previously stated that he did not want to hold the leader's jersey, to remain in the world champion's jersey ahead of defending his title in Valkenburg in the Netherlands.

Stage 4 result

	Rider	Team	Time
1	Mark Cavendish (GBR)	Team Sky	3h 51' 33"
2	Steele Von Hoff (AUS)	Garmin–Sharp	s.t.
3	Leigh Howard (AUS)	Orica–GreenEDGE	s.t.
4	Boy Van Poppel (NED)	UnitedHealthcare	s.t.
5	Daniel Schorn (AUT)	Team NetApp	s.t.
6	Russell Downing (GBR)	Endura Racing	s.t.
7	Magnus Bäckstedt (SWE)	Team UK Youth	s.t.
8	Sep Vanmarcke (BEL)	Garmin–Sharp	s.t.
9	Rony Martias (FRA)	Saur–Sojasun	s.t.
10	Luke Rowe (GBR)	Team Sky	s.t.

General Classification after Stage 4

	Rider	Team	Time
1	Mark Cavendish (GBR)	Team Sky	17h 07' 51"
2	Leigh Howard (AUS)	Orica–GreenEDGE	+ 6"
3	Boy Van Poppel (NED)	UnitedHealthcare	+ 14"
4	Luke Rowe (GBR)	Team Sky	+ 14"
5	Rony Martias (FRA)	Saur–Sojasun	+ 20"
6	Steele Von Hoff (AUS)	Garmin–Sharp	+ 20"
7	Russell Downing (GBR)	Endura Racing	+ 22"
8	Sep Vanmarcke (BEL)	Garmin–Sharp	+ 26"
9	Nathan Haas (AUS)	Garmin–Sharp	+ 26"
10	Yanto Barker (GBR)	Team UK Youth	+ 27"

=== Stage 5 ===
13 September 2012 – Stoke-on-Trent to Stoke-on-Trent, 147 km (91.3 mi)

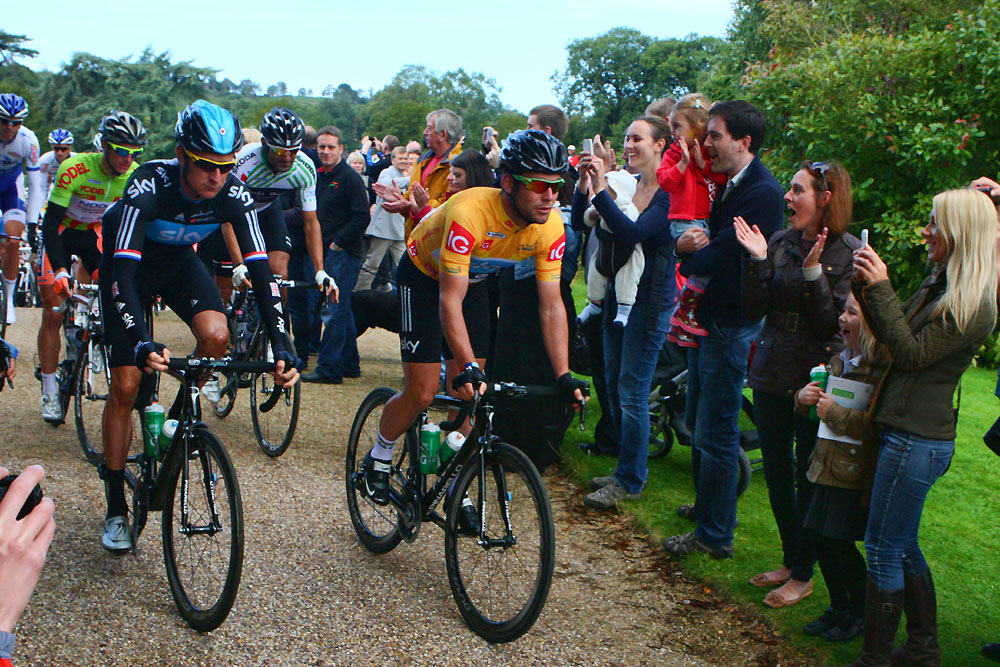
Team Sky's Bradley Wiggins and Mark Cavendish at the start of the stage. Cavendish lost the race lead on the stage, eventually losing almost twelve minutes on stage winner Marc de Maar of UnitedHealthcare.

For the fifth successive year the Tour of Britain held a stage in Stoke-on-Trent, with the fifth stage of the race commencing at Trentham Gardens. The first sprint of the day was contested at only 7.3 km (4.5 mi) into the stage, at Stone. The second sprint point was situated at Uttoxeter and the final such point was located at Rocester. There were three categorised climbs during the stage, with two-second-category climbs coming in Glacial Boulder – at Cannock Chase – and Oakamoor respectively, while there was also a first-category climb at Gun Hill. The field remained together for the first hour of racing during the stage; at the first intermediate sprint point, Orica–GreenEDGE's Leigh Howard took three bonus seconds towards the general classification, ahead of Luke Rowe of Team Sky and Endura Racing rider Russell Downing.

Three riders – Liquigas–Cannondale rider Ivan Basso, Bartosz Huzarski of Team NetApp and Team Raleigh–GAC's Bernard Sulzberger – were able to break clear before the second climb of the day at Oakamoor, also taking maximum points in the process at both of the intermediate sprints en route to the climb. Strong crosswinds at this point allowed the main field to split apart, forming echelons, and also allowed a group of 21 riders to break clear of the peloton, and ultimately joined up with Basso and Huzarski after Sulzberger was dropped to form a 23-man group. Thirteen of the race's seventeen teams were represented in the group, including four members – Howard, Boy Van Poppel (UnitedHealthcare) and Garmin–Sharp pairing Sep Vanmarcke and Nathan Haas – of the overnight top ten in the general classification. The distance between the leaders and the remains of the main field continued to increase, eventually reaching four minutes with around 20 km (12.4 mi) remaining, while race leader Mark Cavendish, of Team Sky, was four minutes further behind after losing contact on the earlier climbs.

Cavendish eventually lost almost twelve minutes on the day, comfortably losing his race lead. In the lead group, Paul Voss (Endura Racing) misjudged a right-hand turn with 9 km (5.6 mi), with Marc de Maar of UnitedHealthcare and Saur–Sojasun rider Jérémie Galland also hitting the tarmac as a result. Galland had to abandon the race with a fractured collarbone. Galland's team-mate Jérôme Coppel then put in an attack on the group, closely followed by Haas before this was chased down. De Maar, having returned to the group after his fall, went on the attack with 6.5 km (4.0 mi) and was not brought back as the Curaçao national champion soloed to his first victory of the year by fifteen seconds. Vanmarcke beat out Van Poppel, Haas and Howard for second place, with Howard retaking the leader's gold jersey by seven seconds ahead of Van Poppel.

Stage 5 result

	Rider	Team	Time
1	Marc de Maar (CUW)	UnitedHealthcare	3h 30' 26"
2	Sep Vanmarcke (BEL)	Garmin–Sharp	+ 15"
3	Boy Van Poppel (NED)	UnitedHealthcare	+ 15"
4	Nathan Haas (AUS)	Garmin–Sharp	+ 15"
5	Leigh Howard (AUS)	Orica–GreenEDGE	+ 15"
6	Sam Bennett (IRL)	An Post–Sean Kelly	+ 15"
7	Damiano Caruso (ITA)	Liquigas–Cannondale	+ 15"
8	Leopold König (CZE)	Team NetApp	+ 15"
DSQ	~~Jonathan Tiernan-Locke (GBR)~~	Endura Racing	+ 15"
10	Jérôme Coppel (FRA)	Saur–Sojasun	+ 15"

General Classification after Stage 5

	Rider	Team	Time
1	Leigh Howard (AUS)	Orica–GreenEDGE	20h 38' 35"
2	Boy Van Poppel (NED)	UnitedHealthcare	+ 7"
3	Sep Vanmarcke (BEL)	Garmin–Sharp	+ 17"
4	Nathan Haas (AUS)	Garmin–Sharp	+ 23"
5	Christian Knees (GER)	Team Sky	+ 24"
DSQ	~~Jonathan Tiernan-Locke (GBR)~~	Endura Racing	+ 24"
7	Damiano Caruso (ITA)	Liquigas–Cannondale	+ 24"
8	Christopher Jones (USA)	UnitedHealthcare	+ 34"
9	Bartosz Huzarski (POL)	Team NetApp	+ 2' 02"
10	David Lelay (FRA)	Saur–Sojasun	+ 2' 02"

=== Stage 6 ===
14 September 2012 – Welshpool to Caerphilly, 189.6 km (117.8 mi)

The sixth stage started and ended in Wales with a profile similar to the Welsh stages that had been held during previous Tours of Britain, while it was also denoted as the queen stage of the race. Stage 6 also marked one of the hardest days in terms of climbing, with four first-category climbs at Cwm Owen, Brecon Beacons, as well as two ascents of Caerphilly mountain. The three sprint points were contested at 25.2 km (15.7 mi), 71.9 km (44.7 mi) and 154.2 km (95.8 mi) respectively, located at Kerry, Llandrindod Wells and Mountain Ash. Six riders formed the breakaway for the stage, which was instigated within the opening few kilometres of the stage; it consisted of mountains classification leader Kristian House (Rapha Condor–Sharp), 2011 sprints winner Pieter Ghyllebert of An Post–Sean Kelly, Node 4–Giordana Racing rider Marcin Białobłocki, Team IG–Sigma Sport's Dan Craven, Graham Briggs representing Team Raleigh–GAC and Team UK Youth's Magnus Bäckstedt. The group held a lead of eight minutes after the first intermediate point in Kerry, which was won by Bialoblocki, before the peloton – led by Endura Racing and Orica–GreenEDGE – started to gradually cut into their lead.

House continued to extend his mountains classification lead by taking the first two climbs of the day, while the peloton remained four minutes behind at the Brecon Beacons, although the group splintered on the descent from the climb – with eleven riders going clear – before eventually coming back together before the Mountain Ash intermediate sprint. At the foot of Caerphilly mountain, Endura Racing's Jonathan Tiernan-Locke attacked out of the peloton, surpassing the remnants of the breakaway, with only Briggs catching up with Tiernan-Locke. Team NetApp's Leopold König linked up with the leaders from a small chasing group, while Ghyllebert tried to rejoin the leaders before being dropped again. Briggs was also dropped with König and Tiernan-Locke remaining clear until the end, where König won the stage and Tiernan-Locke assumed the leader's gold jersey, after Orica–GreenEDGE's Leigh Howard finished 33 seconds behind on the stage.

Stage 6 result

	Rider	Team	Time
1	Leopold König (CZE)	Team NetApp	4h 38' 02"
DSQ	~~Jonathan Tiernan-Locke (GBR)~~	Endura Racing	+ 2"
3	Nathan Haas (AUS)	Garmin–Sharp	+ 19"
4	Damiano Caruso (ITA)	Liquigas–Cannondale	+ 19"
5	Luke Rowe (GBR)	Team Sky	+ 19"
6	Paul Voss (GER)	Endura Racing	+ 19"
7	Christopher Jones (USA)	UnitedHealthcare	+ 19"
8	Simon Yates (GBR)	Great Britain	+ 19"
9	Bartosz Huzarski (POL)	Team NetApp	+ 19"
10	Liam Holohan (GBR)	Team Raleigh–GAC	+ 19"

General Classification after Stage 6

	Rider	Team	Time
DSQ	~~Jonathan Tiernan-Locke (GBR)~~	Endura Racing	25h 16' 57"
2	Leigh Howard (AUS)	Orica–GreenEDGE	+ 13"
3	Nathan Haas (AUS)	Garmin–Sharp	+ 18"
4	Boy Van Poppel (NED)	UnitedHealthcare	+ 20"
5	Damiano Caruso (ITA)	Liquigas–Cannondale	+ 23"
6	Christopher Jones (USA)	UnitedHealthcare	+ 33"
7	Christian Knees (GER)	Team Sky	+ 1' 34"
8	Bartosz Huzarski (POL)	Team NetApp	+ 2' 01"
9	David Lelay (FRA)	Saur–Sojasun	+ 2' 01"
10	Jérôme Coppel (FRA)	Saur–Sojasun	+ 4' 16"

=== Stage 7 ===
15 September 2012 – Barnstaple to Dartmouth, 170.7 km (106.1 mi)

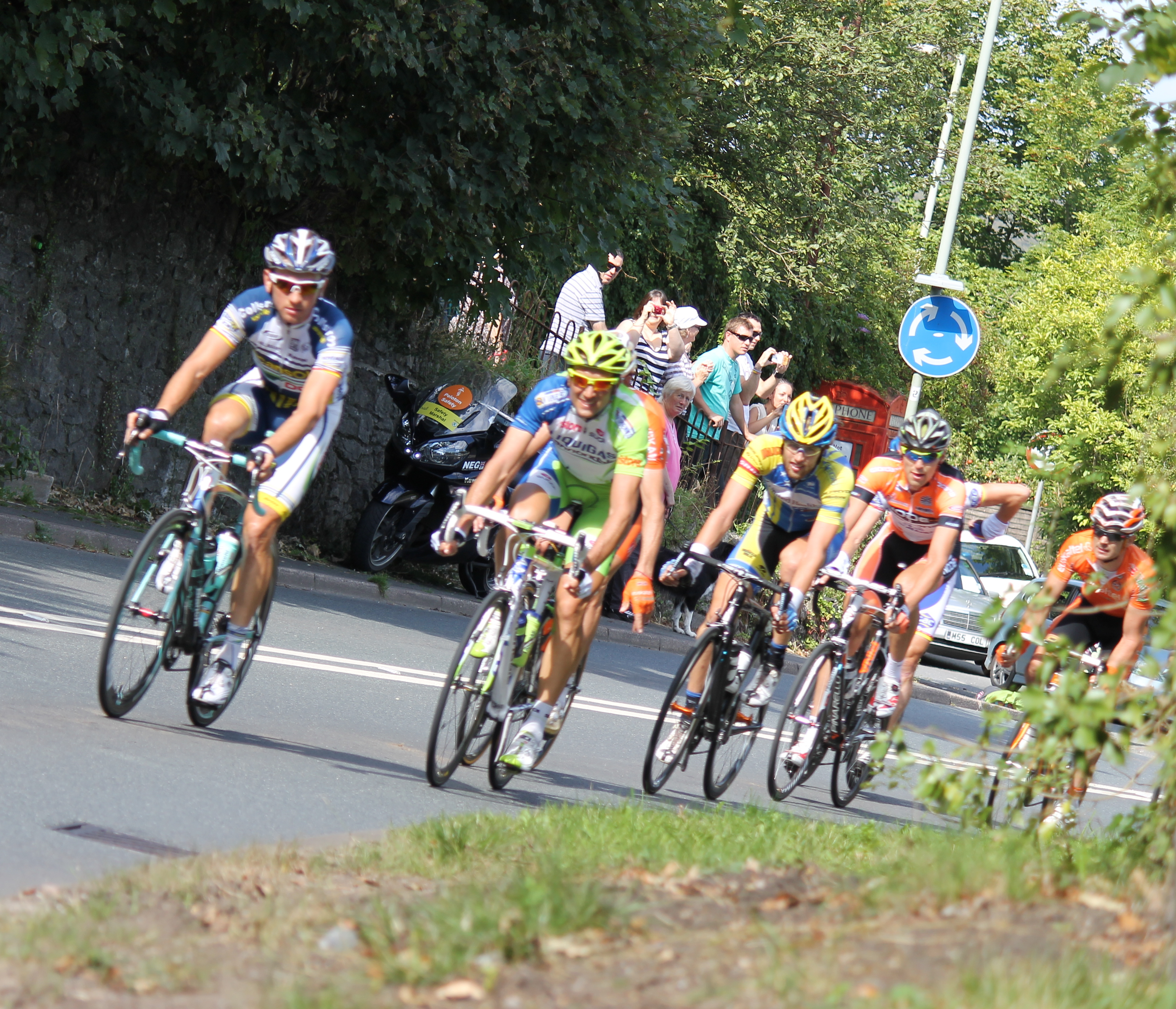
The leading group of riders that remained clear of the peloton towards the end of the stage.

The penultimate stage of the 2012 Tour of Britain started in north Devon, and contained two first-category climbs at Merrivale and Coffin Stone, as well as a second-category climb at South Hill. The day's intermediate sprint points were heavily favoured towards the latter part of the stage, with the final two sprints both coming within the final 30 km (18.6 mi) of the stage. These were situated at Kingsbridge Promenade and Slapton Ley, with the day's first sprint contested at Great Torrington; the field had remained as one complete entity until this point, where Leigh Howard of Orica–GreenEDGE reduced the overall lead of Endura Racing rider Jonathan Tiernan-Locke by three bonus seconds to ten seconds.

After that, the race split apart on the first climb at South Hill, before eventually reforming; the breakaway was formed during this phase of the race, with ten riders eventually going clear at the front. They eventually established an advantage of around four minutes at its maximum before Tiernan-Locke's squad along with Team NetApp started bringing them back at a gradual rate, falling to 1' 20" with around 25 km (15.5 mi) before the advantage started to increase once again. Tiernan-Locke attacked with around 10 km (6.2 mi) remaining, taking the other race contenders Nathan Haas of Garmin–Sharp and Damiano Caruso (Liquigas–Cannondale) with him. Their group eventually finished 46 seconds down on the stage-winning group of four riders, who had remained out front from the breakaway; Pablo Urtasun took his first win of the season for Euskaltel–Euskadi ahead of fifth stage winner Marc de Maar (UnitedHealthcare), Caruso's team-mate Ivan Basso and team-mate of Urtasun, Samuel Sánchez.

Stage 7 result

	Rider	Team	Time
1	Pablo Urtasun (ESP)	Euskaltel–Euskadi	4h 20' 31"
2	Marc de Maar (CUW)	UnitedHealthcare	s.t.
3	Ivan Basso (ITA)	Liquigas–Cannondale	s.t.
4	Samuel Sánchez (ESP)	Euskaltel–Euskadi	+ 2"
5	Leopold König (CZE)	Team NetApp	+ 38"
6	Nathan Haas (AUS)	Garmin–Sharp	+ 46"
7	Bernard Sulzberger (AUS)	Team Raleigh–GAC	+ 46"
8	~~Jonathan Tiernan-Locke (GBR)~~	Endura Racing	+ 46"
9	Bartosz Huzarski (POL)	Team NetApp	+ 46"
10	Damiano Caruso (ITA)	Liquigas–Cannondale	+ 46"

General Classification after Stage 7

	Rider	Team	Time
1	~~Jonathan Tiernan-Locke (GBR)~~	Endura Racing	29h 38' 14"
2	Nathan Haas (AUS)	Garmin–Sharp	+ 18"
3	Damiano Caruso (ITA)	Liquigas–Cannondale	+ 23"
4	Leigh Howard (AUS)	Orica–GreenEDGE	+ 1' 02"
5	Christopher Jones (USA)	UnitedHealthcare	+ 1' 12"
6	Bartosz Huzarski (POL)	Team NetApp	+ 2' 01"
7	David Lelay (FRA)	Saur–Sojasun	+ 2' 01"
8	Boy Van Poppel (NED)	UnitedHealthcare	+ 2' 23"
9	Christian Knees (GER)	Team Sky	+ 2' 26"
10	Jérôme Coppel (FRA)	Saur–Sojasun	+ 4' 21"

=== Stage 8 ===
16 September 2012 – Reigate to Guildford, 147.8 km (91.8 mi)

The final stage of the 2012 Tour of Britain contained four categorised climbs: two third-category climbs at Staple Lane and Crocknorth Road, a second-category climb at Leith Hill and a final first-category climb at Barhatch Lane. Early in the stage there were two sprint points: the first at Dorking just over 10 km (6.2 mi) into the stage, the second on the High Street in the finish town of Guildford; the final sprint of the 2012 Tour was at Ockley. Four riders formed the day's breakaway, consisting of Node 4–Giordana Racing rider Peter Williams – the sprints classification leader, who secured the jersey by getting into the breakaway – as well as Vacansoleil–DCM's Wesley Kreder, Jack Bobridge of Orica–GreenEDGE and Simon Richardson, representing Team IG–Sigma Sport.

The break only got three minutes clear before the peloton gradually brought them back. On the final categorised climb of the race, Barhatch Lane, the overall leader Jonathan Tiernan-Locke (Endura Racing) ramped up the pace and split the main field for a time before it eventually reformed on the descent. Bobridge attacked on his own with 30 km (18.6 mi) remaining of the stage, pulling clear by around half a minute before Team Sky set up station on the front of the peloton to keep Mark Cavendish out of trouble ahead of a likely sprint finish. After Bobridge was caught, three other riders tried solo attacks on the run-in to Guildford without success; setting up the sprint finish, Luke Rowe led it out for Cavendish again, and Cavendish won the sprint – for his third win of the race – by several bike lengths ahead of UnitedHealthcare's Boy Van Poppel, who secured the points classification on the line. Tiernan-Locke finished within the peloton to secure the overall victory.

Stage 8 result

	Rider	Team	Time
1	Mark Cavendish (GBR)	Team Sky	3h 33' 05"
2	Boy Van Poppel (NED)	UnitedHealthcare	s.t.
3	Fabio Sabatini (ITA)	Liquigas–Cannondale	s.t.
4	Russell Downing (GBR)	Endura Racing	s.t.
5	Cesare Benedetti (ITA)	Team NetApp	+ 3"
6	Yanto Barker (GBR)	Team UK Youth	+ 3"
7	Pieter Ghyllebert (BEL)	An Post–Sean Kelly	+ 3"
8	Bernard Sulzberger (AUS)	Team Raleigh–GAC	+ 3"
9	Niels Wytinck (BEL)	An Post–Sean Kelly	+ 3"
10	Richard Lang (AUS)	Rapha Condor–Sharp	+ 3"

Final General Classification

	Rider	Team	Time
1	~~Jonathan Tiernan-Locke (GBR)~~	Endura Racing	33h 11' 22"
2	Nathan Haas (AUS)	Garmin–Sharp	+ 18"
3	Damiano Caruso (ITA)	Liquigas–Cannondale	+ 23"
4	Leigh Howard (AUS)	Orica–GreenEDGE	+ 1' 02"
5	Christopher Jones (USA)	UnitedHealthcare	+ 1' 12"
6	Bartosz Huzarski (POL)	Team NetApp	+ 2' 01"
7	David Lelay (FRA)	Saur–Sojasun	+ 2' 01"
8	Boy Van Poppel (NED)	UnitedHealthcare	+ 2' 14"
9	Christian Knees (GER)	Team Sky	+ 2' 35"
10	Jérôme Coppel (FRA)	Saur–Sojasun	+ 4' 30"

== Classification leadership ==
Stage	Winner	General classification	Sprint Classification	Mountains Classification	Points Classification	Team Classification	Combativity award
1	Luke Rowe	Luke Rowe	Rony Martias	Kristian House	Luke Rowe	Saur–Sojasun	Niels Wytinck
2	Leigh Howard	Boy Van Poppel	Peter Williams	Pablo Urtasun	Boy Van Poppel	Garmin–Sharp	Jack Bobridge
3	Mark Cavendish	Leigh Howard	Peter Williams	Kristian House	Boy Van Poppel	Garmin–Sharp	Peter Hawkins
4	Mark Cavendish	Mark Cavendish	Peter Williams	Kristian House	Boy Van Poppel	Garmin–Sharp	Ronan McLaughlin
5	Marc de Maar	Leigh Howard	Peter Williams	Kristian House	Boy Van Poppel	Saur–Sojasun	Ivan Basso
6	Leopold König	Leigh Howard	Peter Williams	Kristian House	Boy Van Poppel	Saur–Sojasun	Graham Briggs
7	Pablo Urtasun	Nathan Haas	Peter Williams	Kristian House	Boy Van Poppel	Saur–Sojasun	Samuel Sánchez
8	Mark Cavendish	Nathan Haas	Peter Williams	Kristian House	Boy Van Poppel	Saur–Sojasun	Simon Richardson
Final		Nathan Haas	Peter Williams	Kristian House	Boy Van Poppel	Saur–Sojasun	n/a

== Final standings ==
=== General classification ===
	Rider	Team	Time
DSQ	~~Jonathan Tiernan-Locke (GBR)~~	Endura Racing	33h 11' 22"
1	Nathan Haas (AUS)	Garmin–Sharp	+ 18"
2	Damiano Caruso (ITA)	Liquigas–Cannondale	+ 23"
3	Leigh Howard (AUS)	Orica–GreenEDGE	+ 1' 02"
4	Christopher Jones (USA)	UnitedHealthcare	+ 1' 12"
5	Bartosz Huzarski (POL)	Team NetApp	+ 2' 01"
6	David Lelay (FRA)	Saur–Sojasun	+ 2' 01"
7	Boy Van Poppel (NED)	UnitedHealthcare	+ 2' 14"
8	Christian Knees (GER)	Team Sky	+ 2' 35"
9	Jérôme Coppel (FRA)	Saur–Sojasun	+ 4' 30"

=== Points classification ===
	Rider	Team	Points
1	Boy Van Poppel (NED)	UnitedHealthcare	76
2	Mark Cavendish (GBR)	Team Sky	59
3	Nathan Haas (AUS)	Garmin–Sharp	56
4	Russell Downing (GBR)	Orica–GreenEDGE	56
5	Leigh Howard (AUS)	Orica–GreenEDGE	53
6	Luke Rowe (GBR)	Team Sky	50
DSQ	~~Jonathan Tiernan-Locke (GBR)~~	Endura Racing	38
7	Leopold König (CZE)	Team NetApp	34
8	Sep Vanmarcke (BEL)	Garmin–Sharp	32
9	Damiano Caruso (ITA)	Liquigas–Cannondale	31

=== King of the Mountains classification ===
	Rider	Team	Points
1	Kristian House (GBR)	Rapha Condor–Sharp	86
2	Pablo Urtasun (ESP)	Euskaltel–Euskadi	67
3	Bernard Sulzberger (AUS)	Team Raleigh–GAC	49
DSQ	~~Jonathan Tiernan-Locke (GBR)~~	Endura Racing	44
5	Jack Bobridge (AUS)	Orica–GreenEDGE	44
6	Peter Williams (GBR)	Node 4–Giordana Racing	43
7	Leopold König (CZE)	Team NetApp	34
8	Ivan Basso (ITA)	Liquigas–Cannondale	26
9	Damiano Caruso (ITA)	Liquigas–Cannondale	25
10	Samuel Sánchez (ESP)	Euskaltel–Euskadi	25

=== Sprints classification ===
	Rider	Team	Points
1	Peter Williams (GBR)	Node 4–Giordana Racing	45
2	Marcin Białobłocki (POL)	Node 4–Giordana Racing	23
3	Mathew Cronshaw (GBR)	Node 4–Giordana Racing	13
4	Kristian House (GBR)	Rapha Condor–Sharp	11
5	Jack Bobridge (AUS)	Orica–GreenEDGE	11
6	Leigh Howard (AUS)	Orica–GreenEDGE	10
7	Ivan Basso (ITA)	Liquigas–Cannondale	10
8	Wesley Kreder (NED)	Vacansoleil–DCM	10
9	Bernard Sulzberger (AUS)	Team Raleigh–GAC	9
10	Bartosz Huzarski (POL)	Team NetApp	8

=== Team classification ===
Pos.	Team	Time
1	Saur–Sojasun	99h 41' 34"
2	UnitedHealthcare	+ 2' 51"
3	Team NetApp	+ 5' 50"
4	Garmin–Sharp	+ 12' 36"
5	Endura Racing	+ 14' 33"
6	Liquigas–Cannondale	+ 18' 17"
7	Euskaltel–Euskadi	+ 20' 46"
8	An Post–Sean Kelly	+ 21' 50"
9	Node 4–Giordana Racing	+ 24' 06"
10	Team UK Youth	+ 29' 10"
