= 2013 Tour of Britain =

2013 UCI Europe Tour
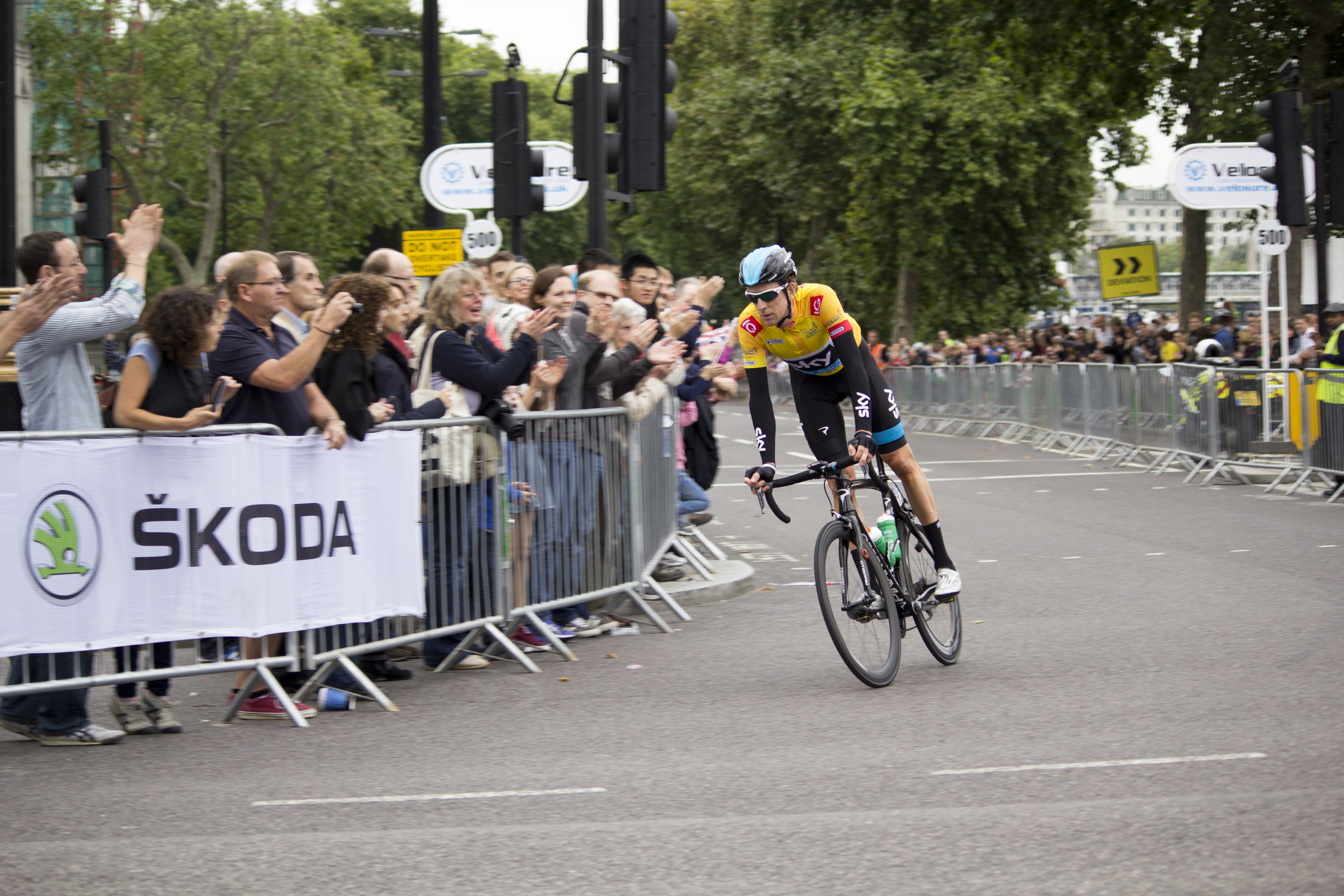
- Sir Bradley Wiggins after the final stage

Race details
- Dates: 15–22 September 2013
- Stages: 8
- Distance: 1,159.3 km (720.4 mi)
- Winning time: 29h 45' 22"

Results
Jersey awarded to the overall winner	Winner	Bradley Wiggins (Great Britain)	(Team Sky)
	Second	Martin Elmiger (Switzerland)	(IAM Cycling)
	Third	Simon Yates (Great Britain)	(Great Britain)
Jersey awarded to the points classification winner	Points	Martin Elmiger (Switzerland)	(IAM Cycling)
Jersey awarded to the mountains classification winner	Mountains	Ángel Madrazo (Spain)	(Movistar Team)
Jersey awarded to the sprints classification winner	Sprints	Ángel Madrazo (Spain)	(Movistar Team)
	Team	Team Sky	

The 2013 Tour of Britain was the tenth running of the current Tour of Britain and the 74th British tour in total. The race consisted of eight stages, starting on 15 September in Peebles, and finishing on 22 September in London. The race was part of the 2013 UCI Europe Tour and was categorised by the UCI as a 2.1 category race.

Sir Bradley Wiggins won the race after gaining a lead in the stage 3 time trial.

== Teams ==
19 teams were invited to participate in the tour: 5 UCI ProTeams, 6 UCI Professional Continental Teams, 7 UCI Continental Teams and one national team.

UCI ProTeams
- Cannondale
- Garmin–Sharp
- Movistar Team
- Omega Pharma–Quick-Step
- Team Sky
UCI Professional Continental Teams
- Bardiani Valvole–CSF Inox
- IAM Cycling
- MTN–Qhubeka
- Sojasun
- NetApp–Endura
- UnitedHealthcare
UCI Continental Teams
- An Post–Chain Reaction
- Team IG–Sigma Sport
- Madison Genesis
- Node 4–Giordana Racing
- Rapha Condor–JLT
- Team Raleigh
- Team UK Youth
National Teams
- Great Britain

== Stages ==
There were 8 stages in the 2013 race covering a total of 1,159.3 kilometres (720 mi). Notable stages were Stage 6, which featured the race's first ever summit finish, and Stage 3, an individual time trial, something absent in the previous edition.

List of stages
Stage	Date	Course	Distance	Type		Winner
1	15 September	Peebles – Drumlanrig Castle	209.9 km (130 mi)		Flat stage	Elia Viviani (ITA)
2	16 September	Carlisle – Kendal	186.6 km (116 mi)		Medium-mountain stage	Gerald Ciolek (GER)
3	17 September	Knowsley – Knowsley	16.1 km (10 mi)	Flat stage	Individual time trial	Bradley Wiggins (GBR)
4	18 September	Stoke-on-Trent – Llanberis	188.4 km (117 mi)		Hilly stage	Mark Cavendish (GBR)
5	19 September	Machynlleth – Caerphilly	177.1 km (110 mi)		Medium-mountain stage	Sam Bennett (IRL)
6	20 September	Sidmouth – Haytor	137 km (85 mi)		Medium-mountain stage	Simon Yates (GBR)
7	21 September	Epsom – Guildford	155.4 km (97 mi)		Hilly stage	Mark Cavendish (GBR)
8	22 September	London – London	88.8 km (55 mi)		Flat stage	Mark Cavendish (GBR)

=== Stage 1 ===
15 September 2013 – Peebles to Drumlanrig Castle, 209.9 km (130.4 mi)

Stage 1 Result

	Rider	Team	Time
1	Elia Viviani (ITA)	Cannondale	6h 04' 43"
2	Alessandro Petacchi (ITA)	Omega Pharma–Quick-Step	s.t.
3	Gerald Ciolek (GER)	MTN–Qhubeka	s.t.
4	Marco Coledan (ITA)	Bardiani Valvole-CSF Inox	s.t.
5	Matteo Pelucchi (ITA)	IAM Cycling	s.t.
6	Evaldas Šiškevičius (LTU)	Sojasun	s.t.
7	Shane Archbold (NZL)	An Post–Chain Reaction	s.t.
8	Jonathan Dibben (GBR)	Great Britain	s.t.
9	Steele Von Hoff (AUS)	Garmin–Sharp	s.t.
10	James Williamson (NZL)	Node 4–Giordana Racing	s.t.

General Classification after Stage 1

	Rider	Team	Time
1	Elia Viviani (ITA)	Cannondale	6h 04' 33"
2	Alessandro Petacchi (ITA)	Omega Pharma–Quick-Step	+ 4"
3	Gerald Ciolek (GER)	MTN–Qhubeka	+ 6"
4	Aaron Gate (NZL)	An Post–Chain Reaction	+ 6"
5	Christophe Laborie (FRA)	Sojasun	+ 6"
6	Anthony Delaplace (FRA)	Sojasun	+ 7"
7	Nathan Haas (AUS)	Garmin–Sharp	+ 8"
8	Peter Hawkins (IRL)	Team IG–Sigma Sport	+ 8"
8	Bradley Wiggins (GBR)	Team Sky	+ 9"
10	Marco Coledan (ITA)	Bardiani Valvole-CSF Inox	+ 10"

=== Stage 2 ===
16 September 2013 – Carlisle to Kendal, 186.6 km (115.9 mi)

Stage 2 Result

	Rider	Team	Time
1	Gerald Ciolek (GER)	MTN–Qhubeka	5h 01' 01"
2	Sam Bennett (IRL)	An Post–Chain Reaction	s.t.
3	Thomas Lövkvist (SWE)	IAM Cycling	+ 6"
4	Simon Yates (GBR)	Great Britain	+ 6"
5	Michał Gołaś (POL)	Omega Pharma–Quick-Step	+ 6"
6	Jack Bauer (NZL)	Garmin–Sharp	+ 6"
7	Martin Elmiger (SUI)	IAM Cycling	+ 9"
8	Marco Coledan (ITA)	Bardiani Valvole–CSF Inox	+ 9"
9	Sergio Pardilla (ESP)	MTN–Qhubeka	+ 9"
10	Julien Vermote (BEL)	Omega Pharma–Quick-Step	+ 9"

General Classification after Stage 2

	Rider	Team	Time
1	Gerald Ciolek (GER)	MTN–Qhubeka	11h 05' 30"
2	Simon Yates (GBR)	Great Britain	+ 20"
3	Michał Gołaś (POL)	Omega Pharma–Quick-Step	+ 20"
4	Marco Coledan (ITA)	Bardiani Valvole–CSF Inox	+ 23"
5	Sergio Pardilla (ESP)	MTN–Qhubeka	+ 23"
6	Julien Vermote (BEL)	Omega Pharma–Quick-Step	+ 23"
7	Martin Elmiger (SUI)	IAM Cycling	+ 23"
8	Sacha Modolo (ITA)	Bardiani Valvole–CSF Inox	+ 23"
9	Scott Thwaites (GBR)	NetApp–Endura	+ 26"
10	Francesco Manuel Bongiorno (ITA)	Bardiani Valvole–CSF Inox	+ 26"

=== Stage 3 ===
17 September 2013 – Knowsley, 16.1 km (10.0 mi) individual time trial (ITT)

Stage 3 Result

	Rider	Team	Time
1	Bradley Wiggins (GBR)	Team Sky	19' 54"
2	Ian Stannard (GBR)	Team Sky	+ 36"
3	Jack Bauer (NZL)	Garmin–Sharp	+ 42"
4	Martin Elmiger (SUI)	IAM Cycling	+ 54"
5	Alex Dowsett (GBR)	Movistar Team	+ 56"
6	David López (ESP)	Team Sky	+ 1' 16"
7	Alexander Wetterhall (SWE)	NetApp–Endura	+ 1' 20"
8	Stefano Pirazzi (ITA)	Bardiani Valvole–CSF Inox	+ 1' 22"
9	Sergio Pardilla (ESP)	MTN–Qhubeka	+ 1' 25"
10	Mark Cavendish (GBR)	Omega Pharma–Quick-Step	+ 1' 26"

General Classification after Stage 3

	Rider	Team	Time
1	Bradley Wiggins (GBR)	Team Sky	11h 25' 54"
2	Ian Stannard (GBR)	Team Sky	+ 37"
3	Martin Elmiger (SUI)	IAM Cycling	+ 47"
4	Jack Bauer (NZL)	Garmin–Sharp	+ 55"
5	Alex Dowsett (GBR)	Movistar Team	+ 57"
6	David López (ESP)	Team Sky	+ 1' 17"
7	Michał Gołaś (POL)	Omega Pharma–Quick-Step	+ 1' 18"
8	Sergio Pardilla (ESP)	MTN–Qhubeka	+ 1' 18"
9	Gerald Ciolek (GER)	MTN–Qhubeka	+ 1' 21"
10	Alexander Wetterhall (SWE)	NetApp–Endura	+ 1' 21"

=== Stage 4 ===
18 September 2013 – Stoke-on-Trent to Llanberis, 188.4 km (117.1 mi)

Stage 4 Result

	Rider	Team	Time
1	Mark Cavendish (GBR)	Omega Pharma–Quick-Step	4h 45' 42"
2	Elia Viviani (ITA)	Cannondale	s.t.
3	Steele Von Hoff (AUS)	Garmin–Sharp	s.t.
4	Matteo Pelucchi (ITA)	IAM Cycling	s.t.
5	José Joaquín Rojas (ESP)	Movistar Team	s.t.
6	Owain Doull (GBR)	Great Britain	s.t.
7	Evaldas Šiškevičius (LTU)	Sojasun	s.t.
8	Scott Thwaites (GBR)	NetApp–Endura	s.t.
9	Chris Opie (GBR)	Team UK Youth	s.t.
10	Sam Bennett (IRL)	An Post–Chain Reaction	s.t.

General Classification after Stage 4

	Rider	Team	Time
1	Bradley Wiggins (GBR)	Team Sky	16h 11' 36"
2	Ian Stannard (GBR)	Team Sky	+ 37"
3	Martin Elmiger (SUI)	IAM Cycling	+ 47"
4	Jack Bauer (NZL)	Garmin–Sharp	+ 55"
5	Alex Dowsett (GBR)	Movistar Team	+ 57"
6	David López (ESP)	Team Sky	+ 1' 17"
7	Michał Gołaś (POL)	Omega Pharma–Quick-Step	+ 1' 18"
8	Sergio Pardilla (ESP)	MTN–Qhubeka	+ 1' 18"
9	Gerald Ciolek (GER)	MTN–Qhubeka	+ 1' 21"
10	Alexander Wetterhall (SWE)	NetApp–Endura	+ 1' 21"

=== Stage 5 ===
19 September 2013 – Machynlleth to Caerphilly, 177.1 km (110.0 mi)

Stage 5 Result

	Rider	Team	Time
1	Sam Bennett (IRL)	An Post–Chain Reaction	4h 35' 29"
2	Michał Gołaś (POL)	Omega Pharma–Quick-Step	s.t.
3	Martin Elmiger (SUI)	IAM Cycling	s.t.
4	David Lelay (FRA)	Sojasun	s.t.
5	Jack Bauer (NZL)	Garmin–Sharp	s.t.
6	Simon Yates (GBR)	Great Britain	s.t.
7	Bradley Wiggins (GBR)	Team Sky	s.t.
8	Sébastien Reichenbach (SUI)	IAM Cycling	s.t.
9	Ian Stannard (GBR)	Team Sky	s.t.
10	Nairo Quintana (COL)	Movistar Team	s.t.

General Classification after Stage 5

	Rider	Team	Time
1	Bradley Wiggins (GBR)	Team Sky	20h 47' 05"
2	Ian Stannard (GBR)	Team Sky	+ 37"
3	Martin Elmiger (SUI)	IAM Cycling	+ 43"
4	Jack Bauer (NZL)	Garmin–Sharp	+ 55"
5	Michał Gołaś (POL)	Omega Pharma–Quick-Step	+ 1' 12"
6	David López (ESP)	Team Sky	+ 1' 17"
7	Sergio Pardilla (ESP)	MTN–Qhubeka	+ 1' 18"
8	Simon Yates (GBR)	Great Britain	+ 1' 23"
9	Dan Martin (IRL)	Garmin–Sharp	+ 1' 38"
10	Sébastien Reichenbach (SUI)	IAM Cycling	+ 1' 44"

=== Stage 6 ===
20 September 2013 – Sidmouth to Haytor, 137 km (85 mi)

Stage 6 Result

	Rider	Team	Time
1	Simon Yates (GBR)	Great Britain	3h 23' 44"
2	Martin Elmiger (SUI)	IAM Cycling	+ 2"
3	David López (ESP)	Team Sky	+ 2"
4	Sergio Pardilla (ESP)	MTN–Qhubeka	+ 5"
5	Sébastien Reichenbach (SUI)	IAM Cycling	+ 5"
6	Nairo Quintana (COL)	Movistar Team	+ 7"
7	Bradley Wiggins (GBR)	Team Sky	+ 7"
8	Francesco Bongiorno (ITA)	Bardiani Valvole–CSF Inox	+ 12"
9	Marcel Wyss (SWI)	IAM Cycling	+ 12"
10	Evaldas Šiškevičius (LTU)	Sojasun	+ 31"

General Classification after Stage 6

	Rider	Team	Time
1	Bradley Wiggins (GBR)	Team Sky	24h 10' 56"
2	Martin Elmiger (SUI)	IAM Cycling	+ 32"
3	Simon Yates (GBR)	Great Britain	+ 1' 06"
4	David López (ESP)	Team Sky	+ 1' 08"
5	Sergio Pardilla (ESP)	MTN–Qhubeka	+ 1' 16"
6	Jack Bauer (NZL)	Garmin–Sharp	+ 1' 19"
7	Ian Stannard (GBR)	Team Sky	+ 1' 34"
8	Michał Gołaś (POL)	Omega Pharma–Quick-Step	+ 1' 36"
9	Sébastien Reichenbach (SUI)	IAM Cycling	+ 1' 42"
10	Nairo Quintana (COL)	Movistar Team	+ 1' 58"

=== Stage 7 ===
21 September 2013 – Epsom to Guildford, 155.4 km (96.6 mi)

Stage 7 Result

	Rider	Team	Time
1	Mark Cavendish (GBR)	Omega Pharma–Quick-Step	3h 46' 57"
2	Elia Viviani (ITA)	Cannondale	s.t.
3	Gerald Ciolek (GER)	MTN–Qhubeka	s.t.
4	Blaž Jarc (SVN)	NetApp–Endura	s.t.
5	Jacob Rathe (USA)	Garmin–Sharp	s.t.
6	Matteo Pelucchi (ITA)	IAM Cycling	s.t.
7	Chris Opie (GBR)	Team UK Youth	s.t.
8	Martin Elmiger (SUI)	IAM Cycling	s.t.
9	Alessandro Bazzani (ITA)	UnitedHealthcare	s.t.
10	Sam Bennett (IRL)	An Post–Chain Reaction	s.t.

General Classification after Stage 7

	Rider	Team	Time
1	Bradley Wiggins (GBR)	Team Sky	27h 57' 59"
2	Martin Elmiger (SUI)	IAM Cycling	+ 26"
3	Simon Yates (GBR)	Great Britain	+ 1' 06"
4	David López (ESP)	Team Sky	+ 1' 08"
5	Sergio Pardilla (ESP)	MTN–Qhubeka	+ 1' 16"
6	Jack Bauer (NZL)	Garmin–Sharp	+ 1' 19"
7	Ian Stannard (GBR)	Team Sky	+ 1' 34"
8	Michał Gołaś (POL)	Omega Pharma–Quick-Step	+ 1' 36"
9	Sébastien Reichenbach (SUI)	IAM Cycling	+ 1' 42"
10	Nairo Quintana (COL)	Movistar Team	+ 1' 56"

=== Stage 8 ===
22 September 2013 – London to London, 88.8 km (55.2 mi)

Stage 8 Result

	Rider	Team	Time
1	Mark Cavendish (GBR)	Omega Pharma–Quick-Step	1h 47' 23"
2	Sam Bennett (IRL)	An Post–Chain Reaction	s.t.
3	Elia Viviani (ITA)	Cannondale	s.t.
4	Matteo Pelucchi (ITA)	IAM Cycling	s.t.
5	Chris Opie (GBR)	Team UK Youth	s.t.
6	Evaldas Šiškevičius (LTU)	Sojasun	s.t.
7	Sacha Modolo (ITA)	Bardiani Valvole–CSF Inox	s.t.
8	Alessandro Petacchi (ITA)	Omega Pharma–Quick-Step	s.t.
9	Enrique Sanz (ESP)	Movistar Team	s.t.
10	Blaž Jarc (SLO)	NetApp–Endura	s.t.

General Classification after Stage 8

	Rider	Team	Time
1	Bradley Wiggins (GBR)	Team Sky	29h 45' 22"
2	Martin Elmiger (SUI)	IAM Cycling	+ 26"
3	Simon Yates (GBR)	Great Britain	+ 1' 03"
4	David López (ESP)	Team Sky	+ 1' 08"
5	Jack Bauer (NZL)	Garmin–Sharp	+ 1' 13"
6	Sergio Pardilla (ESP)	MTN–Qhubeka	+ 1' 16"
7	Ian Stannard (GBR)	Team Sky	+ 1' 34"
8	Sébastien Reichenbach (SUI)	IAM Cycling	+ 1' 42"
9	Michał Gołaś (POL)	Omega Pharma–Quick-Step	+ 1' 46"
10	Marcel Wyss (SUI)	IAM Cycling	+ 1' 57"

== Classification leadership ==
Stage	Winner	General classification	Sprint Classification	Mountains Classification	Points Classification	Team Classification	Combativity award
1	Elia Viviani	Elia Viviani	Aaron Gate	Kristian House	Elia Viviani	An Post–Chain Reaction	Anthony Delaplace
2	Gerald Ciolek	Gerald Ciolek	Nicola Boem	Ángel Madrazo	Gerald Ciolek	Bardiani Valvole–CSF Inox	Ángel Madrazo
3	Bradley Wiggins	Bradley Wiggins	Nicola Boem	Ángel Madrazo	Gerald Ciolek	Team Sky	no award
4	Mark Cavendish	Bradley Wiggins	Aaron Gate	Ángel Madrazo	Elia Viviani	Team Sky	Thomas Scully
5	Sam Bennett	Bradley Wiggins	Ángel Madrazo	Ángel Madrazo	Sam Bennett	Team Sky	Jacob Rathe
6	Simon Yates	Bradley Wiggins	Ángel Madrazo	Ángel Madrazo	Martin Elmiger	Team Sky	Liam Holohan
7	Mark Cavendish	Bradley Wiggins	Ángel Madrazo	Ángel Madrazo	Martin Elmiger	Team Sky	Pete Williams
8	Mark Cavendish	Bradley Wiggins	Ángel Madrazo	Ángel Madrazo	Martin Elmiger	Team Sky	Shane Archbold
Final		Bradley Wiggins	Ángel Madrazo	Ángel Madrazo	Martin Elmiger	Team Sky	Kristian House
