= Joshua Hunt =

British cyclist

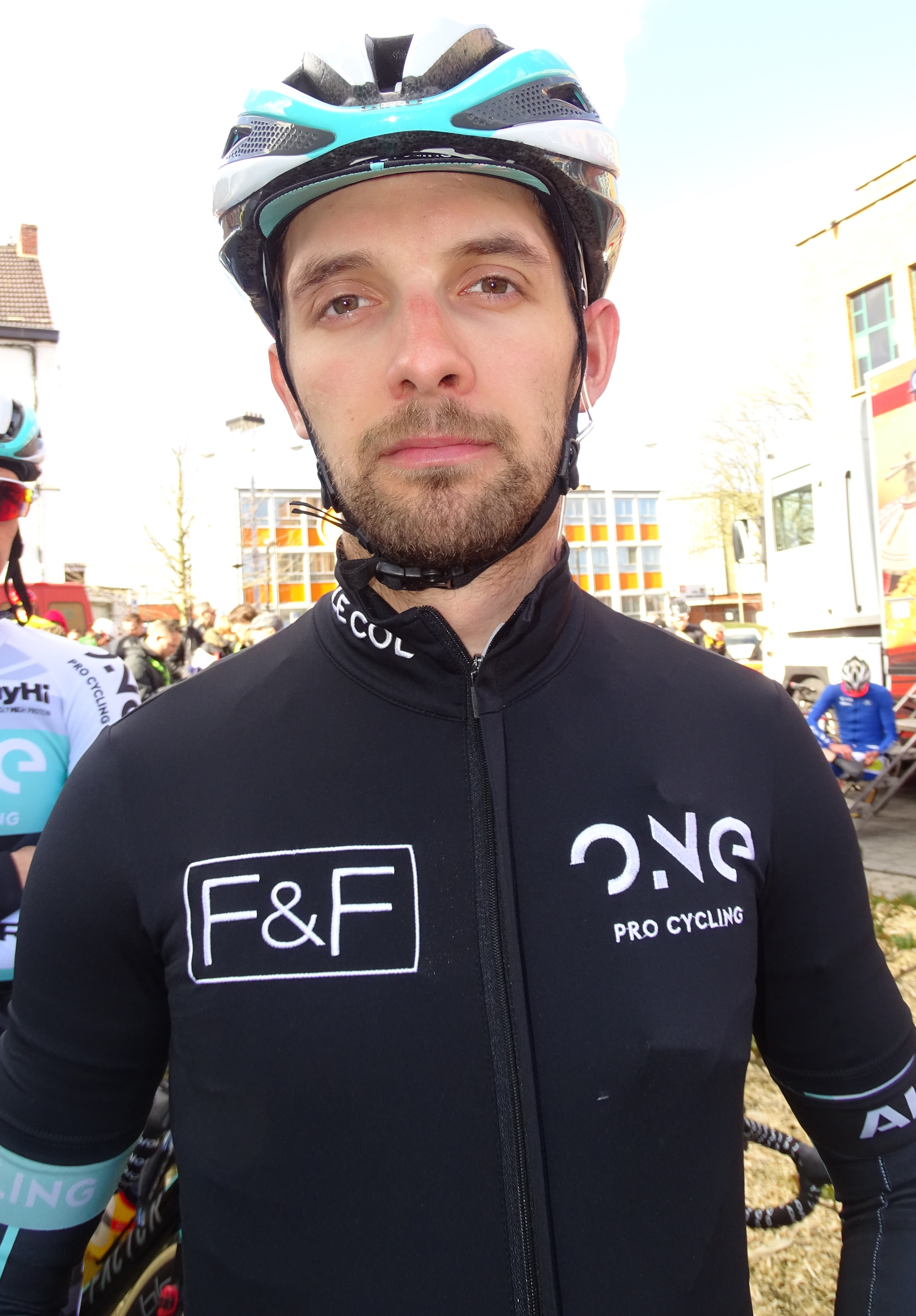
- Hunt in 2016

Personal information
- Full name: Joshua James Hunt
- Born: 3 April 1991 (age 35) Torquay, England

Cycling career
- Sport: Cycling
- Current team: Retired
- Discipline: Road
- Role: Rider

Amateur team
- 2010: UVCA Troyes

Professional teams
- 2013: Team UK Youth
- 2014: NFTO
- 2015–2017: ONE Pro Cycling
- 2018: Vitus Pro Cycling Team

Joshua James Hunt (born 3 April 1991 in Torquay) is an English former racing cyclist, who rode professionally between 2013 and 2018. He took up cycling at the age of 16, receiving his first bike from his half-brother, racing cyclist Jeremy Hunt.

Since retiring, Hunt now works as a cycling performance coach.
