= Jonathan Tiernan-Locke =

English racing cyclist

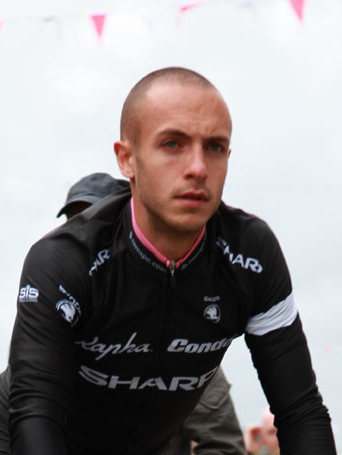
- Tiernan-Locke at the 2011 Tour of Britain

Personal information
- Full name: Jonathan Tiernan-Locke
- Nickname: JTL
- Born: 26 December 1984 (age 41) Plymouth, Devon, England
- Height: 1.74 m (5 ft 9 in)

Cycling career
- Sport: Cycling
- Current team: Retired
- Discipline: Road
- Role: Rider
- Rider type: Puncheur

Amateur teams
- 2003: U.V. Aube
- 2004: British U-23 National team
- 2004: CC Étupes
- 2016: Saint Piran

Professional teams
- 2009: Plowman Craven-Madison
- 2010–2011: Rapha Condor–Sharp
- 2012: Endura Racing
- 2013–2014: Team Sky

Major wins
- Stage races Tour Méditerranéen (2012) Tour du Haut Var (2012)

Jonathan Tiernan-Locke (born 26 December 1984) is a British former professional road racing cyclist who last raced for UCI ProTeam Team Sky in 2013. Tiernan-Locke's major breakthrough came from winning four stage races during the 2012 UCI Europe Tour, including the Tour of Britain, while riding for Endura Racing. In 2014, his 2012 Tour of Britain win was stripped following the identification of anomalies in his biological passport data from around the time of that race, and he was banned from competition until the end of 2015.

== Amateur career ==
Tiernan-Locke started mountain bike racing at the age of 15 before taking up road racing in 2003 when he was 18. He progressed rapidly from 4th Category to 1st Category in a matter of months and for 2004 was offered the chance to ride for the French Amateur team U.V. Aube. Within 18 months he was selected for the British U23 National team, competing in the Under-23 road race at the 2004 UCI Road World Championships in Verona, Italy, and joined the French team CC Étupes for 2005. His impact was immediate, with a win in GP de Rocheville, and podiums on all ten of his first ten races.

Months later his health deteriorated and he was diagnosed with Epstein–Barr virus. Forced to stop racing altogether, he spent the next three years studying for a degree in product design at the University of the West of England, but did not graduate. After recovering his health he started racing again in 2008 but his season was once more disrupted after he was knocked off his bike by a horse while competing in a Surrey League race and suffered injuries including a broken collarbone and nose. In 2009 he finally got the chance to return to the pro ranks with the Plowman Craven-Madison team, but once again misfortune struck as the team folded mid season and Jonathan returned to working in a bike shop.

== Professional career ==
=== 2011: Rapha Condor-Sharp ===
In 2010 he was offered the opportunity to ride with Rapha Condor–Sharp for the 2011 season. He won the mountains classification and finished fifth in the general classification in the Tour of Britain.

=== 2012: Endura Racing ===
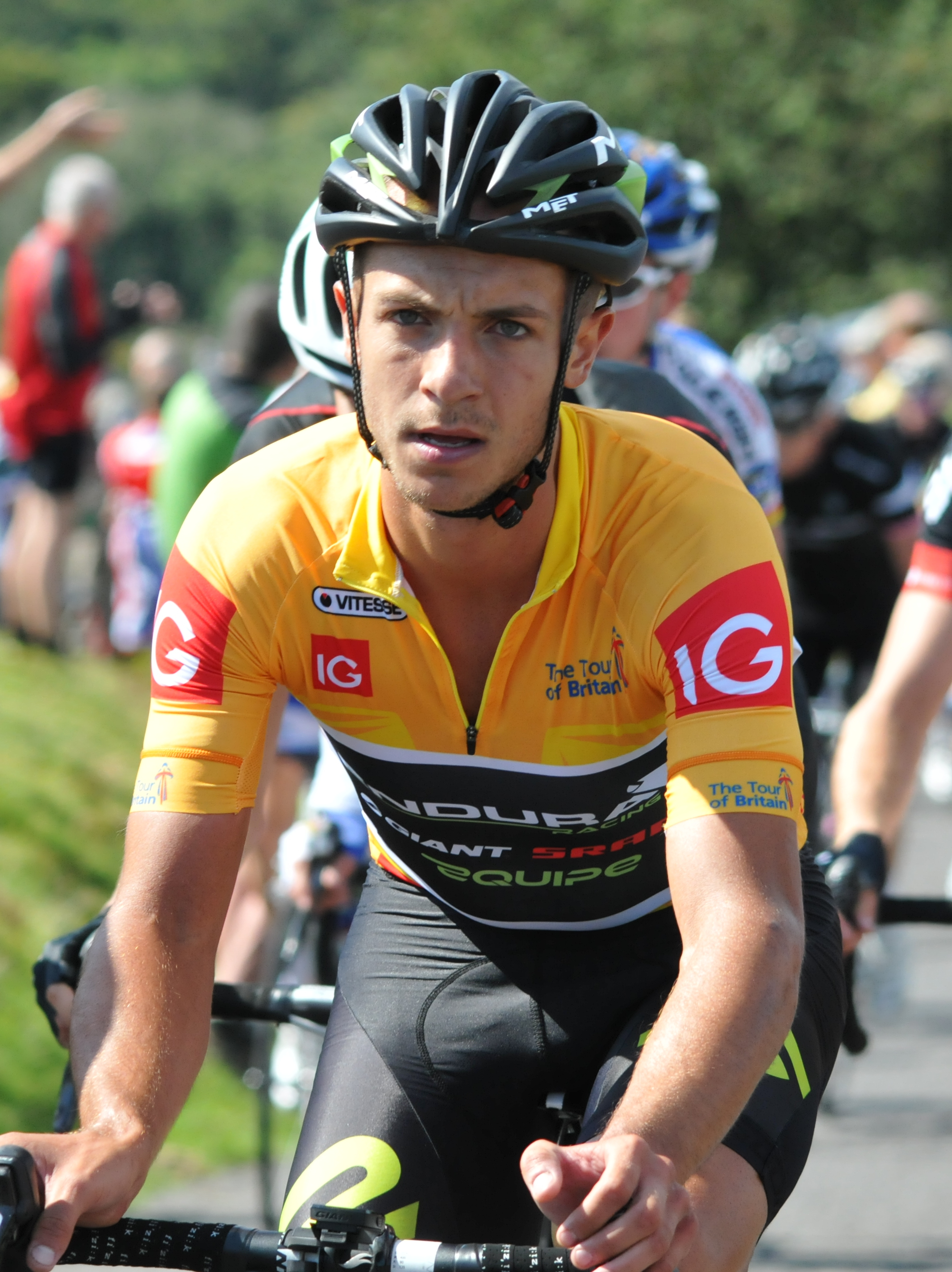
Tiernan-Locke in the leader's jersey at the 2012 Tour of Britain. He was later stripped of the title over bio-passport irregularities

Tiernan-Locke moved to Endura Racing for the 2012 season. At the start of the year he won the Tour Méditerranéen, and the Tour du Haut Var, with those results gaining him the lead of the UCI Europe Tour. Tiernan-Locke later placed second to Movistar Team's Nairo Quintana in the Vuelta a Murcia. He suffered a fractured collarbone at the Lincoln Grand Prix in May, but returned to cycling at June's Route du Sud, finishing 22nd overall. In July he won the Tour Alsace overall as well as two stages during the event. Tiernan-Locke led Endura at his home race, the Tour of Britain. He finished second on stage six, to Caerphilly mountain, to take the lead of the race. He held the lead until the end of the race, becoming the first British rider to win a British cycling tour since 1993.

Tiernan-Locke represented Great Britain at the road world championships finishing 19th. He further enhanced his reputation by staying in contention with the world class field until the final climb.

On 4 October 2012, it was announced that Tiernan-Locke would join UCI ProTeam Team Sky on a two-year contract from the 2013 season onwards.

=== 2013–2014: Team Sky ===
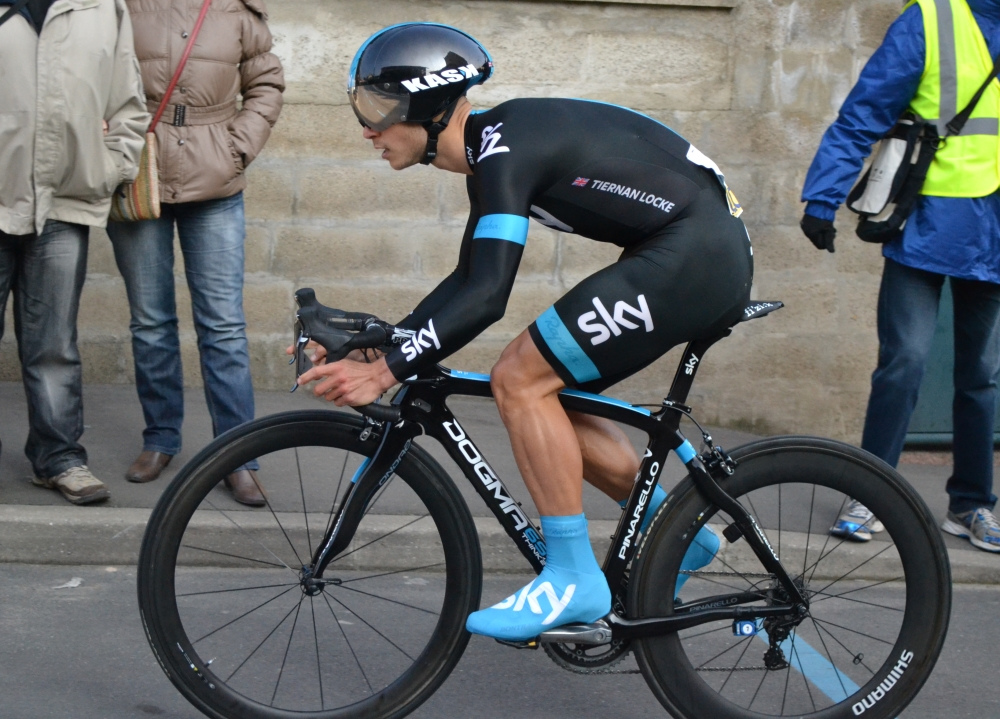
Tiernan-Locke riding for Team Sky at the 2013 Paris–Nice

Tiernan-Locke withdrew from the road world championships on 29 September 2013 because of a potential discrepancy in his biological passport data. He was suspended from racing for Team Sky or taking part in any training activities until he had faced an anti-doping hearing. In July 2014, his ban was announced by the UCI, banning him until 31 December 2015 and stripping his 2012 Tour of Britain and World Championship results. Team Sky immediately terminated his contract. In August 2014, UK Anti-Doping upheld the ban, accepting Tiernan-Locke's claim that he had indulged in binge drinking two days before the positive test but rejecting his contention that he had not rehydrated by the time of the test, given that he was tested on the eve of the 2012 World Championship road race, where he finished 19th. Tiernan-Locke subsequently expressed an interest in returning to professional cycling after the end of his ban.

=== 2016: return to competition ===
In January 2016, following the end of his ban, Tiernan-Locke indicated that he would return to racing as an independent, rather than with a team. He subsequently expressed dissatisfaction with being awarded a second-category racing licence for his return to competition, after having raced with an elite-level licence from 2003 until his ban. Tiernan-Locke later confirmed that he would ride for the Saint Piran team, which he had co-founded. He finished second on his return to racing in the Primavera Road Race in February 2016, and subsequently won the Modbury Spring Road Race in March. In April 2016, he told Cycling Weekly that "I'm realistic that it's a hobby these days, I'm getting by on 10 hours a week training. Realistically, I'm riding at a good level and I'm happy with that".

== Major results ==
2005
1st GP de Rocheville
3rd Des Boucles Catalanes
2008
1st Overall Totnes–Vire

1st Stage 3

2009
6th Severn Bridge Road Race
2010
5th Overall FBD Insurance Ras

1st Stage 5

2011
2nd Overall Vuelta Ciclista a León

1st Mountains classification
1st Stage 4

1st Ryedale Grand Prix
2nd Jock Wadley Memorial
4th Overall Tour de Korea
5th Overall Tour of Britain

1st Mountains classification

8th Overall Tour of South Africa
8th East Yorkshire Classic
2012
1st Overall Tour Alsace

1st Points classification
1st Mountains classification
1st Stages 2 & 4

1st Overall Tour Méditerranéen

1st Points classification
1st Stages 1 & 4

1st Overall Tour du Haut Var

1st Points classification
1st Stage 2

Voided Result.

~~1st Overall Tour of Britain~~

2nd Overall Vuelta a Murcia
3rd Overall UCI Europe Tour
6th Overall Vuelta Ciclista a León

== Personal life ==
On 24 April 2015 Tiernan-Locke was arrested and charged for drunk driving. Analysis of a blood sample found 204 milligrams of alcohol per 100 millilitres of blood. He was sentenced at a magistrates court to a 17-month driving ban.
