= 2012 Tour du Haut Var =

Race details
- Dates: 18–19 February 2012
- Stages: 2
- Distance: 394.6 km (245.2 mi)
- Winning time: 10h 10' 29"

Results
	Winner	Jonathan Tiernan-Locke (GBR)
	Second	Julien El Fares (FRA)
	Third	Julien Simon (FRA)

The 2012 Tour du Haut Var was the 44th edition of the Tour du Haut Var cycle race and was held on 18–19 February 2012. The race started in Draguignan and finished in Fayence. The race was won by Jonathan Tiernan-Locke.

== General classification ==
Final general classification

Rank	Rider	Time
1	Jonathan Tiernan-Locke (GBR)	10h 10' 29"
2	Julien El Fares (FRA)	+ 6"
3	Julien Simon (FRA)	+ 9"
4	Romain Hardy (FRA)	+ 13"
5	Simon Clarke (AUS)	+ 18"
6	Jonathan Hivert (FRA)	+ 20"
7	Christophe Le Mével (FRA)	+ 24"
8	Maxime Bouet (FRA)	+ 28"
9	Fredrik Kessiakoff (SWE)	+ 28"
10	Pierrick Fédrigo (FRA)	+ 28"
