= Christopher Jones (cyclist) =

American cyclist

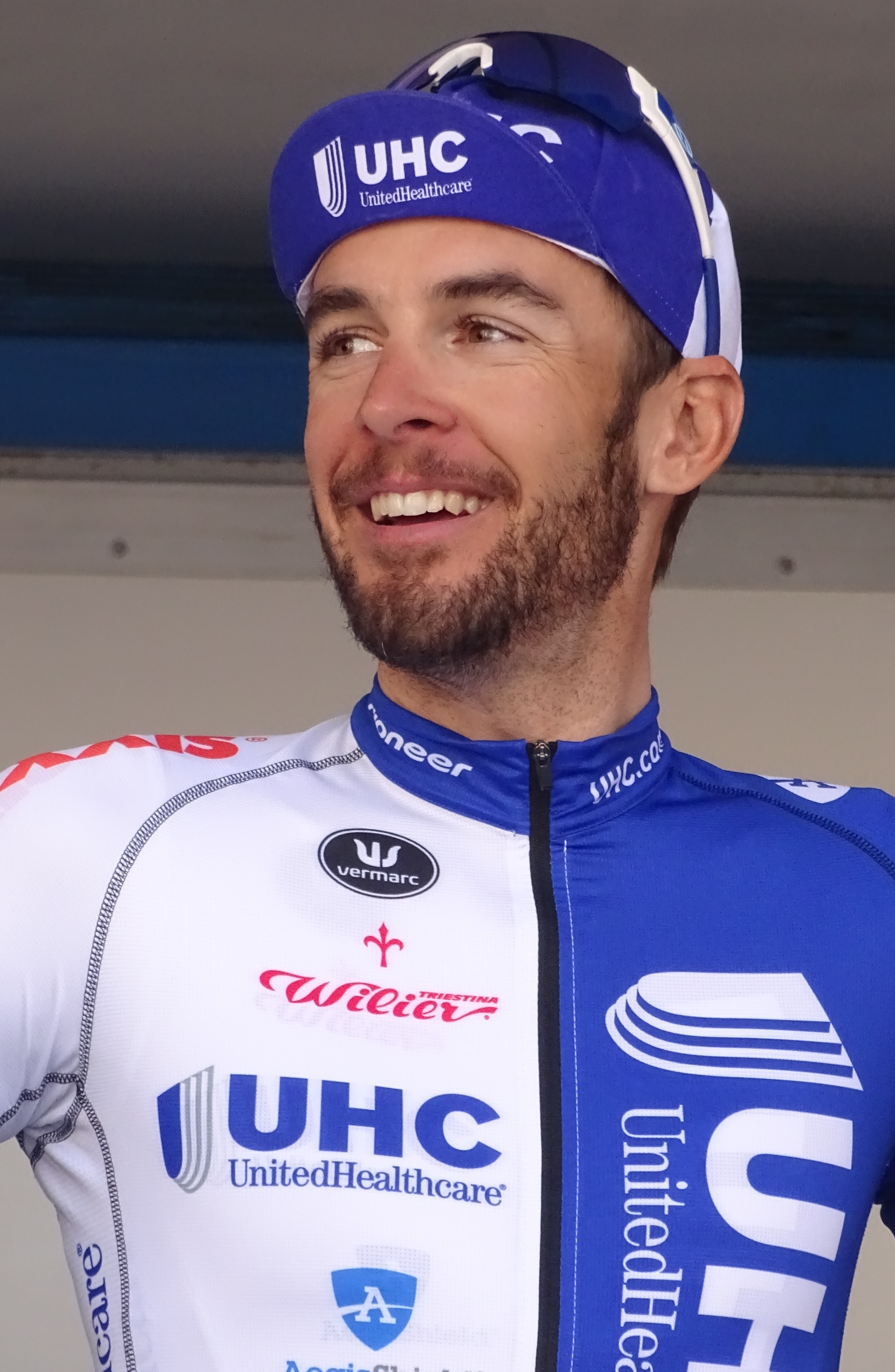

Personal information
- Full name: Christopher Jones
- Born: August 6, 1979 (age 47) Redding, California
- Height: 1.80 m (5 ft 11 in)
- Weight: 64 kg (141 lb)

Cycling career
- Sport: Cycling
- Current team: Retired
- Discipline: Road
- Role: Rider

Professional teams
- 2007: Nerac
- 2008–2010: Team Type 1
- 2011–2017: UnitedHealthcare

Christopher Jones (born August 6, 1979) is an American former professional road cyclist.

== Major results ==
2009
4th Overall Tour de Beauce
2010
2nd Overall Tour do Rio
2012
4th Overall Tour of Britain
2015
3rd The Reading 120
2017
2nd Overall Tour du Maroc
5th Overall Tour of Alberta
