= Caerphilly Mountain =

Geographical feature in Wales

Coordinates: 51.56228°N 3.22334°W

Caerphilly Mountain and Caerphilly Common

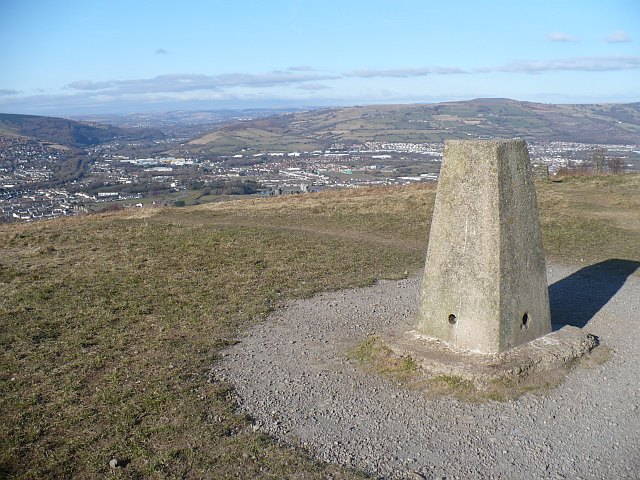
Triangulation point on the summit of Caerphilly Mountain

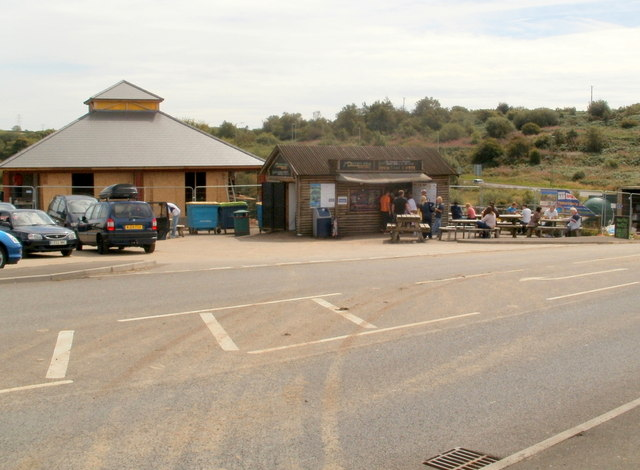
The new and old Caerphilly Mountain Snack Bar

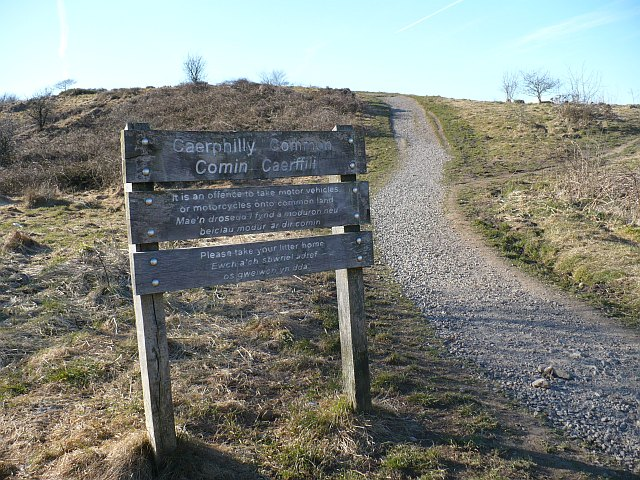
Caerphilly Common

Caerphilly Mountain (Welsh: Mynydd Caerffili) lies between Cardiff and Caerphilly at the southern edge of the South Wales Coalfield. Its summit is 271 metres (889 ft) above sea-level.

Since 1957 there had been a small wooden snack bar near to the summit. In September 2011 this was replaced by an eco-friendly permanent building, with under floor heating, solar panels and rainwater-flushed toilets, at a cost of £300,000. The mountain includes Caerphilly Common (Welsh: Comin Caerffili).

The climb features regularly on the Tour of Britain cycle race, with double climbs in the 2012 and 2013 races.
