= Nathan Haas =

Australian racing cyclist

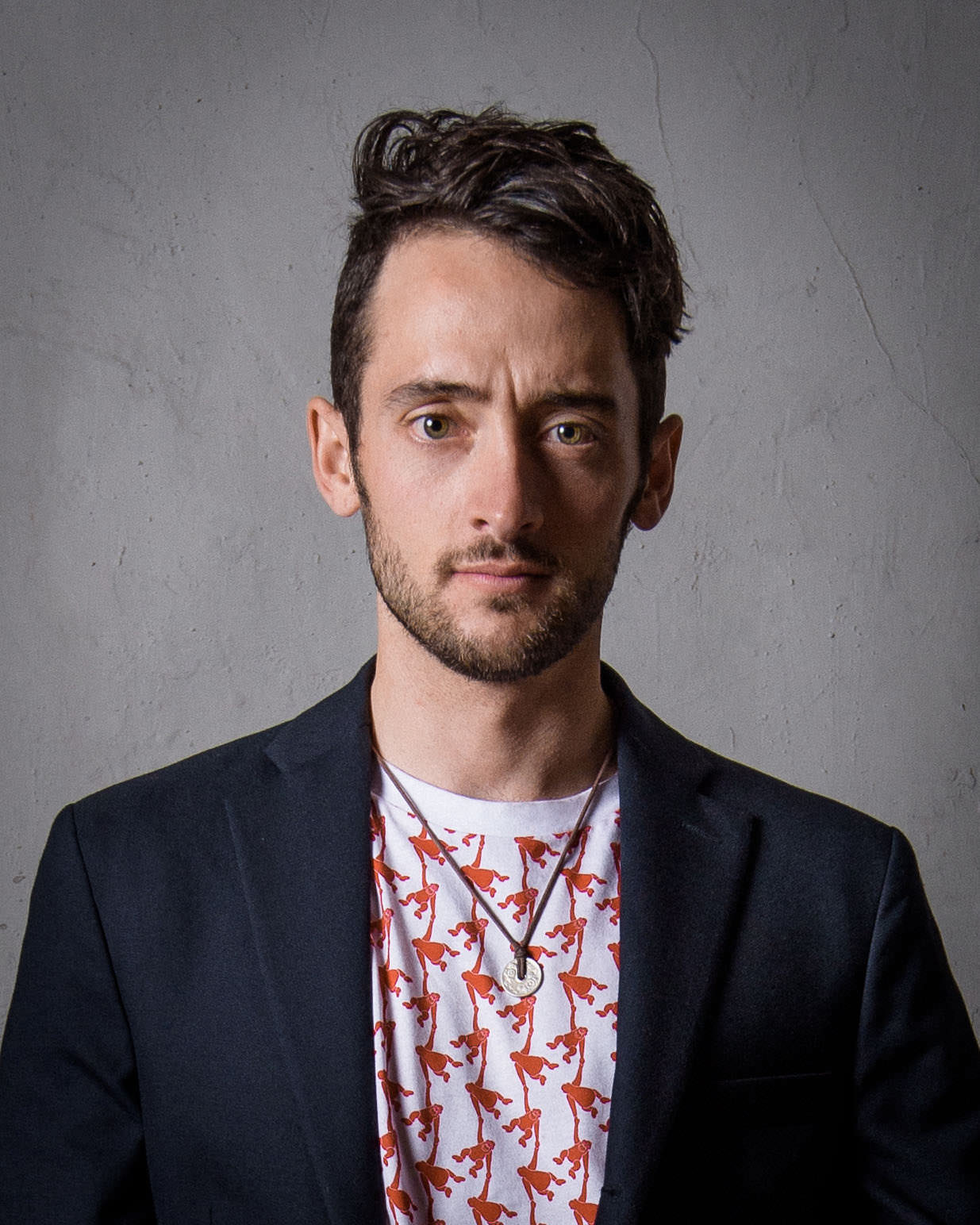
- Nathan Haas at the Qhubeka Charity Gala in Girona 2016

Personal information
- Full name: Nathan Peter Haas
- Nickname: Haasy or The Rabbit
- Born: 12 March 1989 (age 37) Brisbane, Queensland, Australia
- Height: 1.78 m (5 ft 10 in)
- Weight: 71 kg (157 lb)

Cycling career
- Sport: Cycling
- Current team: Cofidis
- Discipline: Road
- Role: Rider
- Rider type: Puncheur

Professional teams
- 2009–2011: Praties
- 2012–2015: Garmin–Barracuda
- 2016–2017: Team Dimension Data
- 2018–2019: Team Katusha–Alpecin
- 2020–2021: Cofidis

Major wins
- Stage races Tour of Britain (2012) Herald Sun Tour (2011) One-day races and Classics Japan Cup (2011, 2014)

Nathan Peter Haas (born 12 March 1989) is an Australian cyclist. He competed as a professional road racer until the end of 2021. He started competing full time in gravel events 2022.

== Career ==
=== Early career ===
Born in Brisbane, Queensland, Australia, Haas was originally a mountain biker, and represented Australia in two UCI World Championships. However, in 2009, Haas switched to road racing.

=== Praties (2009–2011) ===
In 2011, after dominating Australia's domestic National Road Series with Genesys Wealth Advisers teammate Steele Von Hoff, Haas won the Herald Sun Tour. Haas also won the Japan Cup, a race featuring numerous UCI ProTeams. After his victory, Haas turned professional, signing with Garmin–Barracuda.

=== Garmin–Barracuda (2012–2015) ===
During Haas' first professional season, he struggled with severe saddle sores. Following Jonathan Tiernan-Locke's doping ban, Haas was retroactively awarded the 2012 Tour of Britain title; he originally finished second to Tiernan-Locke. During the 2013 season, Haas finished sixth overall at the Tour de Langkawi, and competed in his first Grand Tour, the Giro d'Italia. While riding the 2014 Tour Down Under, Haas garnered his first UCI World Tour point, before finishing the race fifth overall.

He was named in the start list for the 2015 Tour de France.

=== Dimension Data (2016–2017) ===
In the autumn of 2015 Team Dimension Data announced that Haas had signed with them for the 2016 season, joining former team-mate Tyler Farrar at the South African outfit.

=== Team Katusha–Alpecin (2018–2019) ===
In February 2018, Haas won stage 2 of the Tour of Oman in an uphill sprint finish and moved into the overall leader's jersey. It was his first victory since 2016 and his first for Team Katusha–Alpecin. He finished fifth overall in the race, winning the points classification in the process. He also recorded a podium placing at the Tour of Turkey.

== Personal life ==
Haas currently resides in Girona, Catalonia, Spain.

== Major results ==
2009
5th Time trial, National Under-23 Road Championships
2010
4th Time trial, National Under-23 Road Championships
2011
1st Overall Herald Sun Tour
1st Overall Tour of Tasmania
1st Japan Cup
Oceania Under-23 Road Championships

2nd Road race
5th Time trial

2nd Road race, National Under-23 Road Championships
2012
1st Overall Tour of Britain
1st Stage 2 (TTT) Tour of Utah
10th Japan Cup
2013
6th Overall Tour de Langkawi
2014
1st Japan Cup
4th Overall Herald Sun Tour

1st Stage 1

5th Overall Tour Down Under
6th Brabantse Pijl
2015
3rd Cadel Evans Great Ocean Road Race
5th Overall Circuit de la Sarthe
6th Brabantse Pijl
2016
1st Stage 4 Vuelta a Burgos
1st Mountains classification, Tour de Yorkshire
4th Road race, National Road Championships
5th Grand Prix Cycliste de Montréal
6th Grand Prix Cycliste de Québec
6th Cadel Evans Great Ocean Road Race
2017
3rd Road race, National Road Championships
4th Overall Tour Down Under
4th Amstel Gold Race
7th Cadel Evans Great Ocean Road Race
10th Overall Tour of Oman
2018
3rd Overall Presidential Tour of Turkey
National Road Championships

5th Road race
5th Time trial

5th Overall Tour of Oman

1st Points classification
1st Stage 2

8th Grand Prix Cycliste de Québec
2019
4th Time trial, National Road Championships
9th Rund um Köln
2020
5th Time trial, National Road Championships
2021
10th Paris–Camembert
2022
UCI Gravel World Series

2nd Seven Gravel Race
2nd La Monsterrato

=== Grand Tour general classification results timeline ===
| Grand Tour | 2013 | 2014 | 2015 | 2016 | 2017 | 2018 | 2019 | 2020 |
|---|---|---|---|---|---|---|---|---|
| Giro d'Italia | DNF | 104 | — | — | DNF | — | — | 119 |
| Tour de France | — | — | DNF | — | — | — | — | — |
| Vuelta a España | — | 143 | — | DNF | — | — | — | — |

Legend
| — | Did not compete |
| DNF | Did not finish |
