= Yanto Barker =

Welsh road racing cyclist

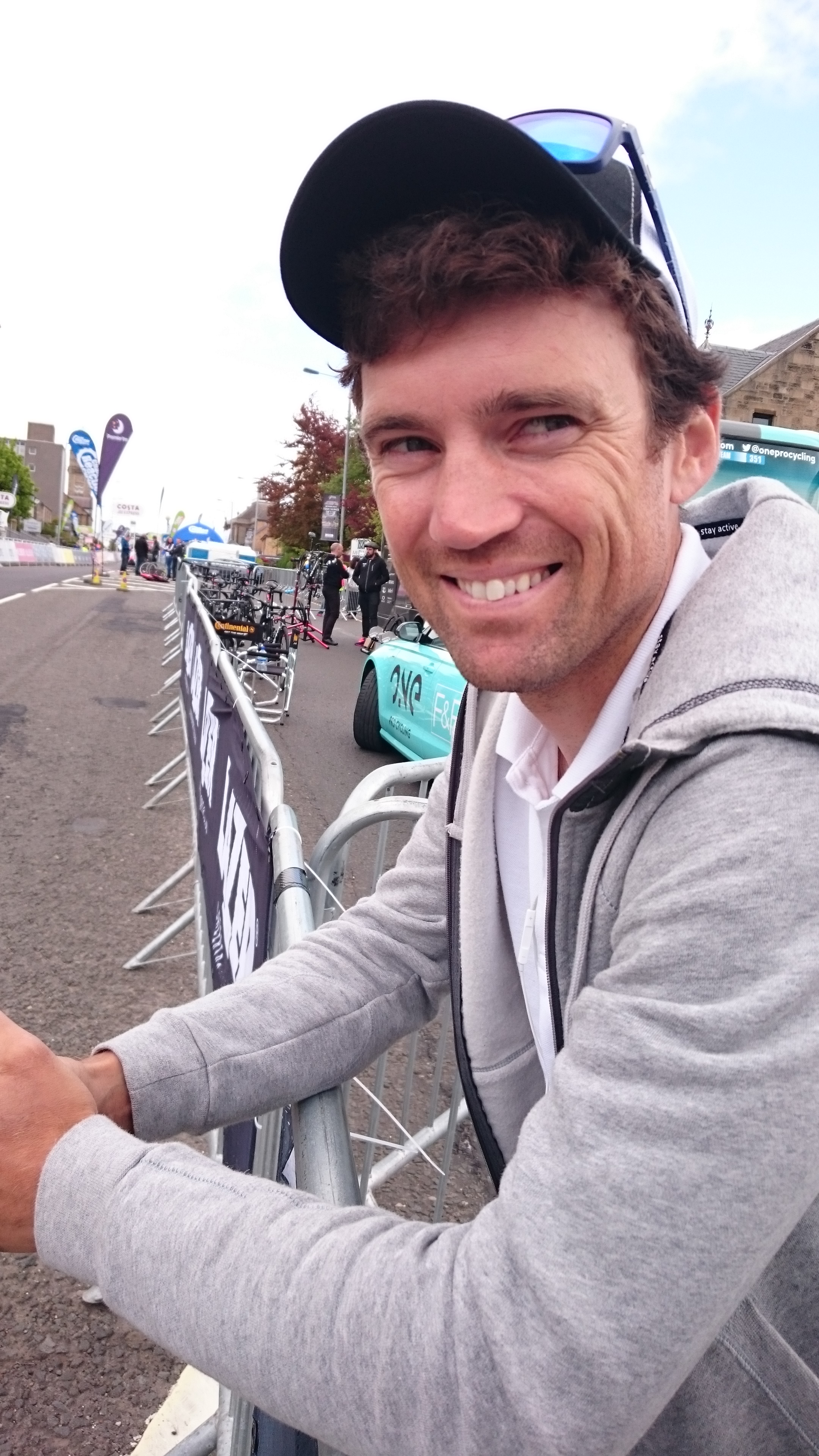
- Barker in 2015

Personal information
- Full name: Yanto Alexander Critchlow-Barker
- Born: 6 January 1980 (age 46) Carmarthen, Wales
- Height: 1.82 m (6 ft 0 in)
- Weight: 69 kg (152 lb; 10.9 st)

Cycling career
- Sport: Cycling
- Current team: Retired
- Discipline: Road
- Role: Rider

Amateur teams
- 1998: Mid Devon Cycling Club
- 2001–2002: VC Roubaix
- 2003: CC Etupes
- 2003: MBK-Oktos-Saint-Quentin (stagiaire)
- 2009: Colnago Team
- 2017: Le Col

Professional teams
- 2000: Linda McCartney Racing Team
- 2005–2006: Driving Force Logistics
- 2010–2011: Pendragon Sports/Le Col/Colnago Team
- 2012–2013: Team UK Youth
- 2014: Team Raleigh
- 2015–2016: ONE Pro Cycling

Yanto Alexander Critchlow-Barker (born 6 January 1980) is a British former professional racing cyclist from Wales, who was the highest placed Briton in the 2005 Tour of Britain, coming ninth in the general classification.

== Career ==
Born in Carmarthen and despite starting racing late at the age of 15, joining the Mid-Devon Cycling Club, Barker was successful in the junior ranks (aged 16–18). Having won the Junior British National Road Race Championships, he was selected to ride the Junior Road Race World Championships where he finished 11th.

When Barker joined the senior ranks at the age of 19, he was selected to represent Britain as part of the National U23 team, and was paid. He moved to Manchester to be closer to the track and the medical & coaching team. He competed in the Under-23 road races at the UCI Road World Championships in 1999, 2001 and 2002, taking his best finish in 2002 when he crossed the line in 12th place.

By 2000, there was less money available for cyclists such as Barker and, following the advice of a coach, he moved to France at the age of 20 to gain experience of continental racing. He represented Wales at the 2006 Commonwealth Games in Melbourne

He initially retired from professional cycling in 2007, returning to live in Devon but returned to cycling in 2010 to ride for the Pendragon Sports / Le Col / Colnago Team. Barker signed for Team UK Youth for 2012.

In 2013, Barker won the inaugural edition of the 200-kilometre (120-mile) UCS Ipswich and Coastal GP when sprinting clear on an eight-man group containing Mike Northey and Rob Partridge.

It was announced in November 2013 that Barker had signed for Team Raleigh for 2014. After one season with Raleigh Barker was announced as the leader of the new ONE Pro Cycling team for the 2015 season. In September 2016 Barker announced that he would retire at the end of the season.

== Personal life ==
He lived in Wales as a child but later moved to Devon. He runs his own cycling clothing company called Le Col, which became a co-title sponsor of the Team Wiggins Le Col UCI Continental team for 2019. Le Col has provided the cycling kit for UCI WorldTeam Bora–Hansgrohe since the start of the 2022 season.

== Major results ==
1998
1st Road race, National Junior Road Championships
2nd Road race, Welsh Road Championships
2001
6th La Côte Picarde
2002
3rd Grand Prix de la Ville de Lillers
2003
1st Overall Mavic Cup Series

2nd Course La Ville

1st Stage 1 Circuit des Mines
9th Bordeaux–Saintes
2004
1st Overall Mavic Cup Series

5th GP Rougy

1st GP Carelleur
2nd Tour De France Compte
3rd Grand Prix des Marbriers
4th Overall Tour Nord-Isère
10th Overall Tour de Serbie
10th Paris–Troyes
2005
1st Overall Surrey 5-day
2nd East Yorkshire Classic
2nd Havant GP
3rd Road race, National Road Championships
3rd Round of the Surrey League, 'Eastway Classic'/'Taunton Criterium'
4th Overall Rás Tailteann
6th Paris–Troyes
6th La Roue Tourangelle
8th Lincoln Grand Prix
9th Overall Tour of Britain
10th Hel van het Mergelland
2009
3rd East Midlands Classic
2010
3rd East Midlands Classic
4th Overall Tour of Libya
5th Dumfries Bike Fest Grand Prix
10th GP Al Fatah
2011
4th Hillingdon GP
2012
5th Rutland–Melton CiCLE Classic
7th Grand Prix de la Ville de Lillers
2013
Tour Series

1st Kirkcaldy & Stoke-on-Trent

1st UCS Ipswich and Coastal GP
3rd Perfs Pedal Race
4th Rutland–Melton CiCLE Classic
9th Wales Open Criterium
2014
1st Overall British Cycling Elite Road Series

4th Ipswich and Coastal Grand Prix
5th Circuit of the Fens
7th Wales Open Criterium
7th Leicester Castle Classic

1st Overall British Cycling Spring Cup

1st Lincoln Grand Prix
3rd Overall Tour of the Reservoir
5th Cycle Wiltshire Grand Prix

1st Evesham Vale Road Race
5th Jersey International Road Race
2015
1st Perfs Pedal Race
2nd Grand Prix of Wales
2nd Cycle Wiltshire Grand Prix
2nd Severn Bridge Road Race
3rd Beaumont Trophy
4th Overall Totnes-Vire Stage Race
10th Chorley Grand Prix
2016
7th Vuelta a La Rioja
