= Team UK Youth =

British cycling team

Team information
- UCI code: UKY
- Registered: United Kingdom
- Founded: 2011
- Disbanded: 2013
- Discipline: Road
- Status: UCI Continental
- Bicycles: Cervelo

Key personnel
- General manager: Nigel Mansell
- Team manager: David Povall

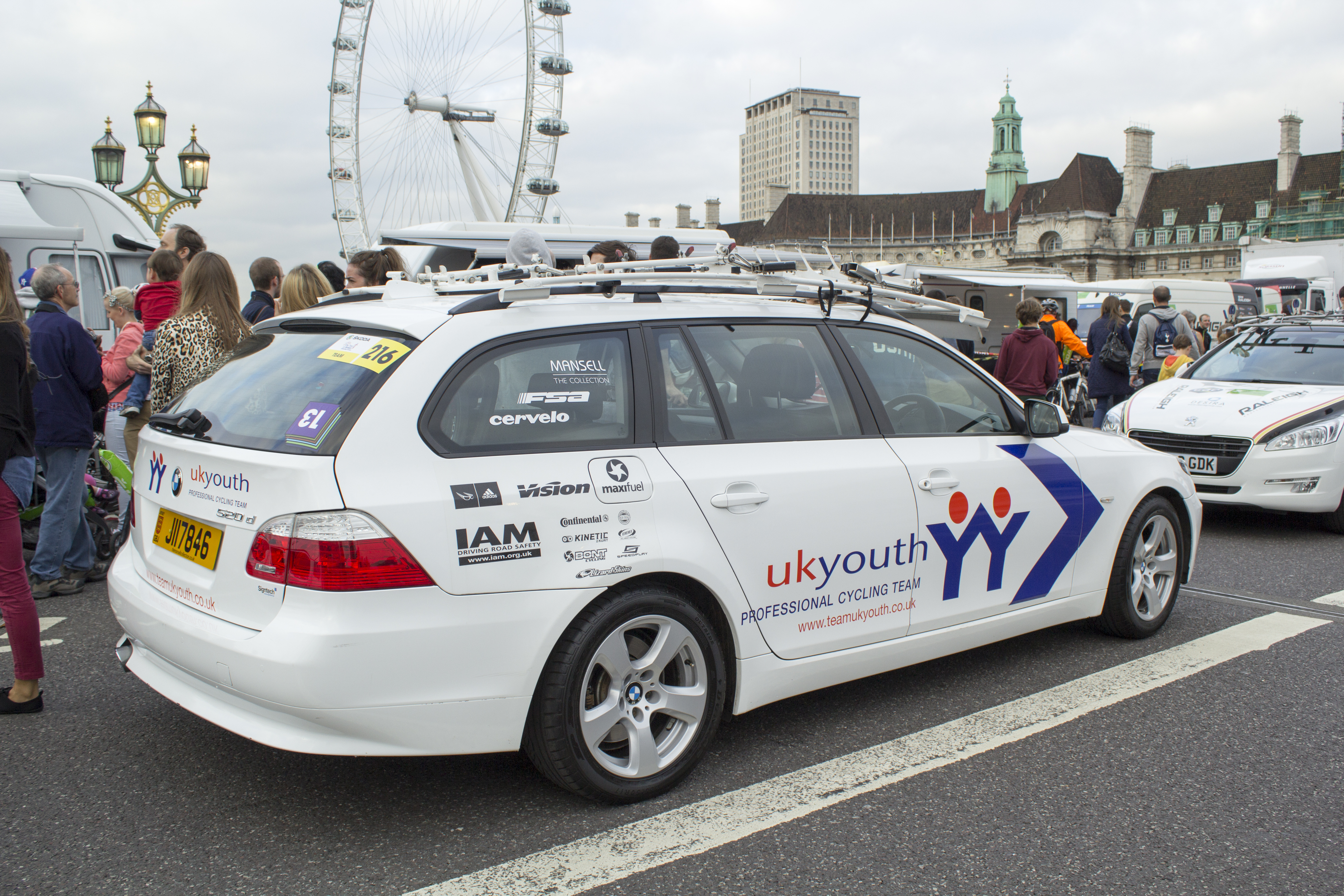
Team UK Youth support vehicle at 2013 Tour of Britain

Team UK Youth (UCI team code: UKY) was a British UCI Continental cycling team, competing from 2011 to 2013.

== Profile ==
Founded in 2011 Team UK Youth were sponsored by UK Youth, a UK-based youth work charity. The team rode senior professional events in the United Kingdom and Europe, other than the Grand Tours and UCI ProTour races. For the 2012 season they expanded the team, joining the UCI Continental Circuits, and competing in the Tour of Britain.

The team was owned by former Formula One and Indycar champion Nigel Mansell.

At the end of the 2013 season, the team announced that unless a new headline sponsor could be found, they would not compete in 2014.

== Major wins ==
2013
Rutland–Melton International CiCLE Classic, Ian Wilkinson
Overall Pearl Izumi Tour Series

Round 1 – Individual 1st, Yanto Barker
Round 3 – Team 1st; Individual 1st, Yanto Barker
Round 4 – Team 1st
Round 5 – Team 1st
Round 6 – Team 1st; Individual 1st, Jon Mould
Round 8 – Team 1st; Individual 1st, Chris Opie
Round 9 – Team 1st
Round 10 – Team 1st; Individual 1st, Chris Opie
Round 11 – Team 1st (team time trial)
Round 12 – Team 1st

Overall An Post Rás, Marcin Białobłocki

== 2013 team ==
As of 15 January 2013.

Rider	Date of birth
Yanto Barker (GBR)	6 January 1980 (age 46)
Marcin Białobłocki (POL)	2 September 1983 (age 43)
Niklas Gustavsson (SWE)	28 January 1989 (age 37)
Tobyn Horton (GUE)	7 October 1986 (age 39)
Joshua Hunt (GBR)	3 April 1991 (age 35)
James Lowsley-Williams (GBR)	12 January 1992 (age 34)

Rider	Date of birth
Greg Mansell (GBR)	8 November 1987 (age 38)
Jonathan Mould (GBR)	4 April 1991 (age 35)
Chris Opie (GBR)	22 July 1987 (age 39)
Rob Partridge (GBR)	11 September 1985 (age 40)
Richard Tanguy (GBR)	18 December 1986 (age 39)
Ian Wilkinson (GBR)	14 April 1979 (age 47)
