= Peter Hawkins (cyclist) =

Irish racing cyclist

Personal information
- Born: 16 December 1985 (age 40)

Cycling career
- Sport: Cycling
- Current team: Retired
- Discipline: Road
- Role: Rider

Professional teams
- 2013: Team IG–Sigma Sport
- 2014: Madison Genesis

Peter Hawkins (born 16 December 1985) is a former Irish professional racing cyclist who last rode for Madison Genesis. He now works as a cycling coach for upshift-velo.

== Career ==
Although Hawkin's professional racing career only lasted two years he raced at the elite level in Ireland from 2008. In 2008 and 2014 he won the National Criterium Championships allowing him to wear the jersey of Ireland in all Criteriums raced those seasons. In 2013, while racing for Team IG–Sigma Sport, Hawkins finished 47th in Stage 1 of the An Post Ras but due to bonus seconds he was sitting 7th Overall. After making it to the finish of Stage 2 in the breakaway Hawkins sprinted to fourth place by doing so he moved into the Yellow leaders jersey. Hawkins abandoned the race during Stage 3 after crashing and having been suspected of having a broken collarbone. He represented Northern-Ireland at the 2014 Commonwealth Games racing in the Men's road race where he was one of 128 who did not finish.

== Major results ==
2006
3rd Overall Portaferry

1st Stage 1

2008
1st National Criterium Championships
1st Stage 1 Surrey League Stage Race
2nd Des Hanlon Memorial
2009
3rd Des Hanlon Memorial
3rd GP Dussessoye André Beselare-Zonnebeke
2011
2nd Des Hanlon Memorial
9th National Championships - Road Race
2012
1st Des Hanlon Memorial
1st Bobby Crilly Classic
1st Ulster Championships
4th Overall Tour of the North

1st Stage 2

5th Stage 1 Tour of Britain
2014
1st National Criterium Championships
7th Melton International CiCLE Classic
2015
4th Stage 3 An Post Ras
