= 1982 British National Track Championships =

- Venue: Leicester, England
- Date(s): 25 July – 1 August 1982
- Velodrome: Leicester Velodrome

The 1982 British National Track Championships were a series of track cycling competitions held from 25 July – 1 August 1982 at the Leicester Velodrome.

== Medal summary ==
=== Men's Events ===
Year	Gold	Silver	Bronze
Time Trial	Gary Sadler	Terry Tinsley	Mark Barry
Amateur Sprint	Mark Barry	Paul Swinnerton	Terry Tinsley
Professional Sprint	Dave Le Grys	Andy Hayes	John Tudor
Prof Individual Pursuit	Sean Yates	Tony Doyle	Ian Banbury
Amateur Individual Pursuit	Shaun Wallace	Tony Mayer	Steve Denton
Team pursuit	Manchester Wheelers; Darryl Webster; Greg Newton; Philip Rayner; Hugh Cameron	Velo Club Nottingham; Gary Sadler; Tony Mayer; Keith Reynolds; Sandy Gilchrist	SF - Stoke ACCS or GS Strada
Amateur 50 km Points	Paul Curran	Darryl Webster	Des Fretwell
Amateur 20 km Scratch	Gary Sadler	Dave Edwards	Dennis Lightfoot
Madison	Paul Curran & Hugh Cameron	Tony Fantham & Steve Gowar	Terry Tinsley & Phil Rayner
Professional Omnium	Ian Hallam	Tony Doyle	Phil Thomas
Tandem	Terry Tinsley & Paul Sydenham		SF - Paul Swinnerton & N Boulton, John Arkwright & Mark Minting, K Haynes & Richard Grace
Derny	Des Fretwell	Geoff Armstrong	Steve Wakefield

=== Women's Events ===
Year	Gold	Silver	Bronze
Sprint	Brenda Atkinson	Ann Davey	Susan Lee
Individual Pursuit	Mandy Jones	Catherine Swinnerton	Barbara Collins or Pauline Strong
