= British National Individual Sprint Championships =

British cycling national competition

The British National Individual Sprint Championships are held annually as part of the British National Track Championships organised by British Cycling. The men's championship was inaugurated in 1930 and won by Sydney Cozens.

== Men's Senior Race ==
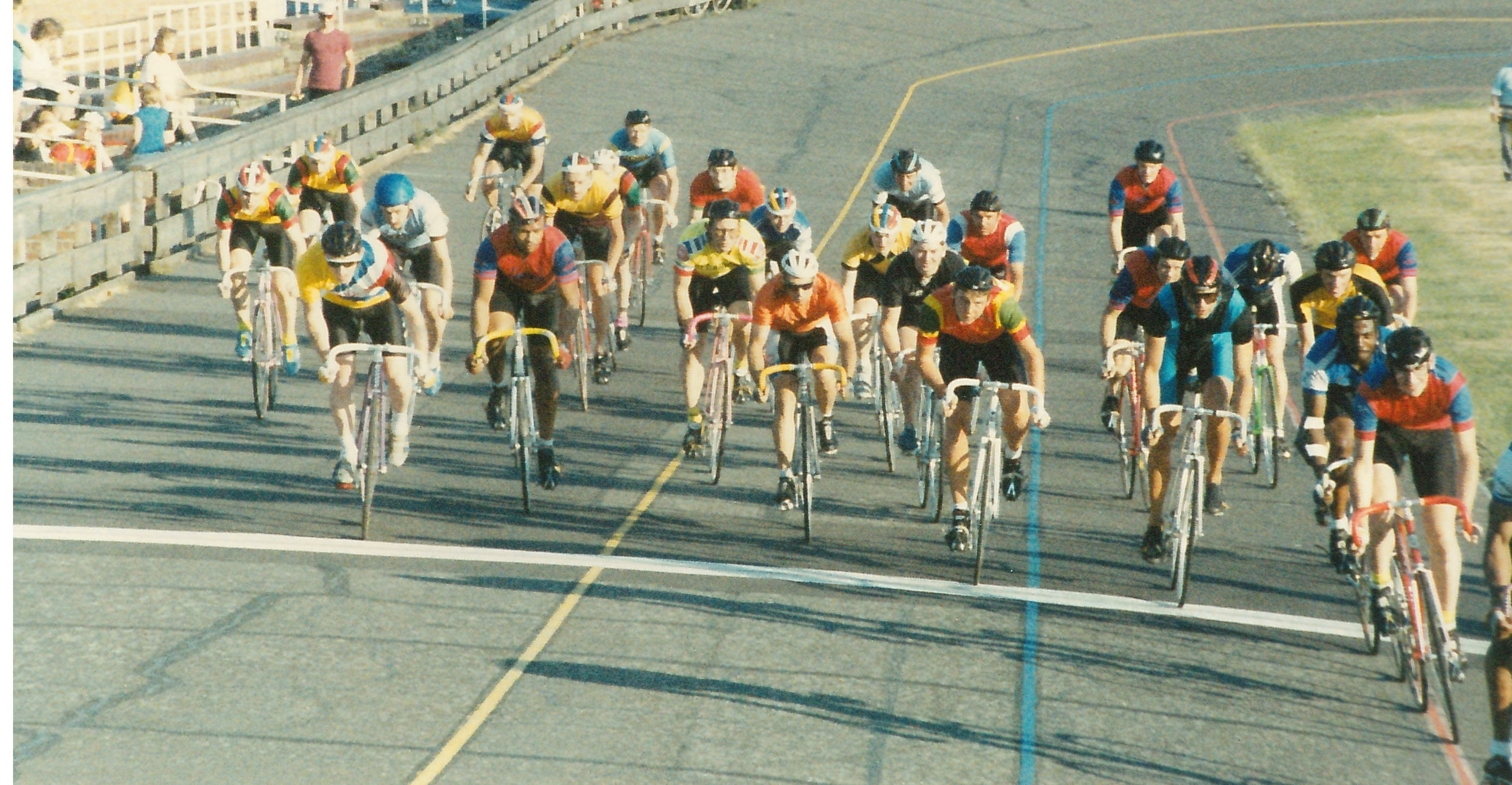
Herne Hill Velodrome

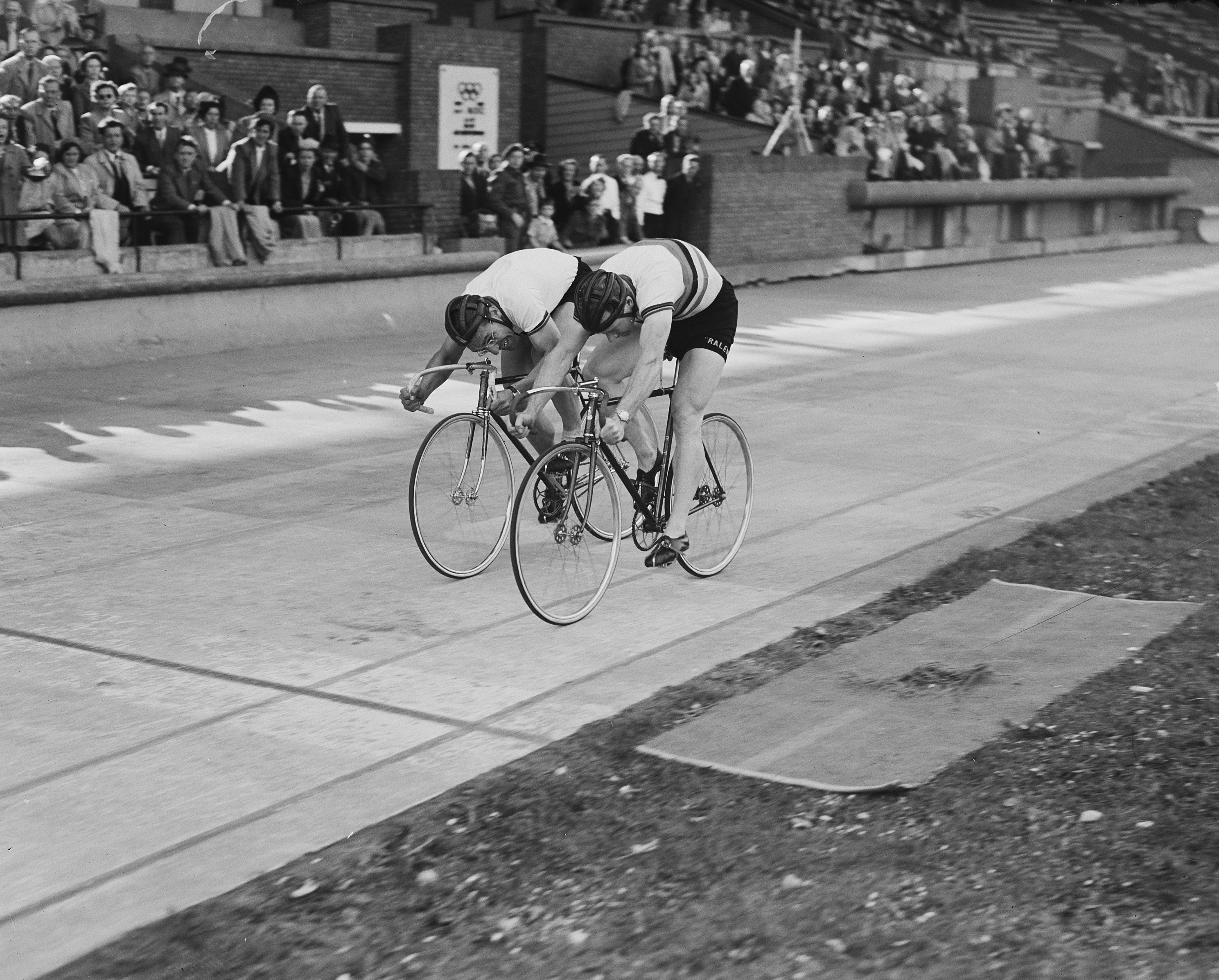
Reg Harris, five time winner

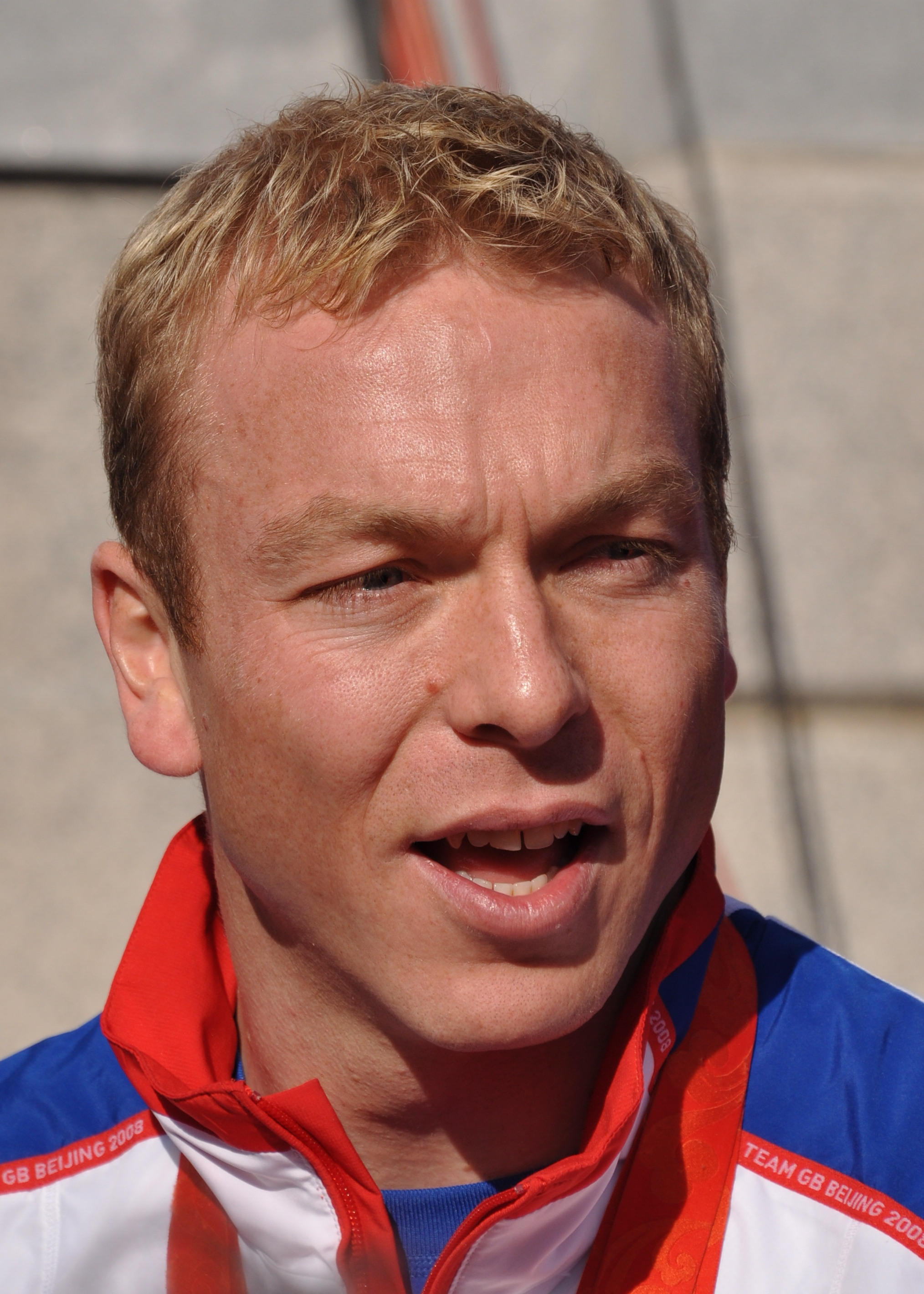
Chris Hoy

Year	Gold	Silver	Bronze	Venue	Ref
1930	Sydney Cozens	Albert Theaker	John Sibbit	Herne Hill Velodrome	
1931	John Sibbit	Sydney Cozens	Dennis Horn	Fallowfield Stadium	
1932	John Sibbit	Dennis Horn (disq)	Ernest Chambers	Herne Hill Velodrome	
1933	Franz Dusika	Charles Rampelberg	Dennis Horn	Fallowfield Stadium	
1934	Toni Merkens	Dennis Horn	Franz Dusika	Herne Hill Velodrome	
1935	Toni Merkens	Ernest Higgins	Dennis Horn	Herne Hill Velodrome	
1936	Charles Helps	Dennis Horn	Ernest Higgins	Herne Hill Velodrome	
1937	Cyril Horn	Dennis Horn	Eddie Gorton	Herne Hill Velodrome	
1938	Dennis Horn	R W H Thompson	SF - Bill Maxfield & Charles Helps	Herne Hill Velodrome	
1939	Bill Maxfield	David Ricketts	Frederick W Tickler	Herne Hill Velodrome	
1944	Reg Harris			Fallowfield Stadium	
1945	Reg Harris			Fallowfield Stadium	
1946	Reg Harris	Lew Pond	Ken Marshall	Herne Hill Velodrome	
1947	Reg Harris	Ken Marshall	Lew Pond	Herne Hill Velodrome	
1948	Alan Bannister	Reg Harris	Lew Pond	Herne Hill Velodrome	
1949	Alan Bannister	Lew Pond		Herne Hill Velodrome	
1950	Alan Bannister	Wilfred Waters	Lew Pond	Herne Hill Velodrome	
1951	Cyril Bardsley	Alan Bannister	Lloyd Binch	Herne Hill Velodrome	
1952	Cyril Peacock	Donald McKellow	Pete Brotherton	Herne Hill Velodrome	
1953	Cyril Peacock	Lloyd Binch	Jackie Tighe	Herne Hill Velodrome	
1954	Cyril Peacock	Lloyd Binch	Jackie Tighe	Herne Hill Velodrome	
1955	Lloyd Binch	Keith Harrison	David Handley	Herne Hill Velodrome	
1956	Lloyd Binch	David Handley		Fallowfield Stadium	
1957	Lloyd Binch	David Handley	SF- Keith Harrison; E Thompson	Fallowfield Stadium	
1958	Lloyd Binch	Keith Harrison	David Handley	Herne Hill Velodrome	
1959	Lloyd Binch	Ken Lowe		Harvey Hadden Stadium	
1960	Lloyd Binch	David Handley	Karl Barton	Herne Hill Velodrome	
1961	Lloyd Binch	Don Skene	Karl Barton	Wolverhampton	
1962	Karl Barton	David Handley	Lloyd Binch	Herne Hill Velodrome	
1963	Karl Barton	Ian Alsop	Peter Robinson	Herne Hill Velodrome	
1964	Karl Barton	Chris Church	SF- Fred Booker; Geoff Cooke	Gosling Stadium	
1965	Roger Whitfield	Ian Alsop	Brendan McKeown	Salford Park, Birmingham	
1966 P	Norman Hill				
1966 A	Fred Booker	Ian Alsop	Reg Barnett	Kirkby Stadium	
1967 P	Bill Painter	Keith Butler	Norman Hill	Leicester Velodrome	
1967 A	Reg Barnett	Fred Booker	Roger Whitfield	Nottingham	
1968 P	Trevor Bull	Tony Gowland	Tony Birkett	Salford Park, Birmingham	
1968 A	Reg Barnett	Roger Whitfield	John Rhead	Salford Park, Birmingham	
1969 P	Reg Barnett			Leicester Velodrome	
1969 A	Roger Whitfield	Bob Bicknell		Leicester Velodrome	
1970 P	Reg Barnett	Graeme Gilmore	Geoff Wiles	Leicester Velodrome	
1970 A	Ernie Crutchlow	Jim Middlemore	Brian Cox	Leicester Velodrome	
1971 P	Gordon Johnson	Reg Barnett	Reg Harris	Salford Park, Birmingham	
1971 A	Ernie Crutchlow	Pete Wright	SF- Geoff Cooke & Tony Brockhurst	Leicester Velodrome	
1972 P	Reg Barnett	Trevor Bull	Tony Gowland	Wolverhampton	
1972 A	Ernie Crutchlow	Dave Rowe		Leicester Velodrome	
1973 P	Reg Barnett	Trevor Bull	Geoff Wiles	Leicester Velodrome	
1973 A	Ernie Crutchlow	Geoff Cooke	Dave Watkins	Leicester Velodrome	
1974 P	Reg Harris	Trevor Bull	Nigel Dean	Leicester Velodrome	
1974 A	Malcolm Hill	Geoff Cooke	Dave Le Grys	Leicester Velodrome	
1975 P	Trevor Bull	Reg Harris	Alan Williams	Leicester Velodrome	
1975 A	Paul Medhurst	Dave Rowe	Dave Le Grys	Leicester Velodrome	
1976 P	Alan Williams	Trevor Bull	Keith Hanson	Leicester Velodrome	
1976 A	John Tudor	Dave Le Grys	Andy Coady	Leicester Velodrome	
1977 P	Mick Bennett	Trevor Bull	Steve Heffernan	Leicester Velodrome	
1977 A	Trevor Gadd	John Tudor	Dave Le Grys	Leicester Velodrome	
1978 P	Ian Hallam	Paul Medhurst	Mick Bennett	Leicester Velodrome	
1978 A	Trevor Gadd	Dave Le Grys	Steve Cronshaw	Leicester Velodrome	
1979 P	Ian Hallam	Dave Rowe	Ian Banbury	Leicester Velodrome	
1979 A	Steve Cronshaw	Terry Tinsley	Paul Swinnerton	Leicester Velodrome	
1980 P	Ernie Crutchlow	Ian Hallam	Dave Watkins	Leicester Velodrome	
1980 A	Terry Tinsley	Gary Sadler	Dave Le Grys	Leicester Velodrome	
1981 P	Ian Hallam	Dave Watkins	Tony James	Leicester Velodrome	
1981 A	Paul Swinnerton	Terry Tinsley	Piers Hewitt	Leicester Velodrome	
1982 P	Dave Le Grys	Andy Hayes	John Tudor	Leicester Velodrome	
1982 A	Mark Barry	Paul Swinnerton	Terry Tinsley	Leicester Velodrome	
1983 P	Terry Tinsley	Dave Le Grys	Andy Hayes	Leicester Velodrome	
1983 A	Mark Barry	Paul Sydenham	Eddie Alexander or Paul Swinnerton	Leicester Velodrome	
1984 P	Terry Tinsley	Paul Swinnerton	Dave Le Grys	Leicester Velodrome	
1984 A	Paul McHugh	Mark Barry		Leicester Velodrome	
1985 P	Terry Tinsley	Dave Le Grys	Kevin Lloyd	Leicester Velodrome	
1985 A	Paul McHugh	Eddie Alexander	Mark Barry	Leicester Velodrome	
1986 P	Dave Le Grys	Dave Miller	Mark Walsham	Leicester Velodrome	
1986 A	Paul McHugh	Stewart Brydon	Dave Marsh	Leicester Velodrome	
1987 P	Dave Le Grys	Russell Williams	Dave Miller	Leicester Velodrome	
1987 A	Eddie Alexander	Paul McHugh	Stewart Brydon	Leicester Velodrome	
1988 P	Gary Sadler	Gary Coltman	Russell Williams	Leicester Velodrome	
1988 A	Eddie Alexander	Stewart Brydon	Paul McHugh	Leicester Velodrome	
1989 A	Stewart Brydon	Eddie Alexander	Steve Paulding	Leicester Velodrome	
1990 A	Stewart Brydon	Steve Paulding	Anthony Stirrat	Leicester Velodrome	
1990 P	Paul McHugh	Gary Coltman	Alastair Wood	Leicester Velodrome	
1991 A	Stewart Brydon	Eddie Alexander	Steve Paulding	Leicester Velodrome	
1991 P	Paul McHugh	Gary Coltman	Russell Williams	Leicester Velodrome	
1992 A	Stewart Brydon	Steve Paulding	Gary Hibbert	Leicester Velodrome	
1992 P	Paul McHugh	Gary Coltman	Russell Williams	Leicester Velodrome	
1993	Stewart Brydon	Gary Hibbert	Paul McHugh	Leicester Velodrome	
1994	Stewart Brydon	Gary Hibbert	Craig Percival	Leicester Velodrome	
1995	Steve Paulding	Neil Potter	Anthony Stirrat	Manchester Velodrome	
1996	Craig Percival	Craig MacLean	Peter Jacques	Manchester Velodrome	
1997	Craig MacLean	Neil Campbell	Peter Jacques	Manchester Velodrome	
1998	Craig MacLean	Neil Campbell	Chris Hoy	Manchester Velodrome	
1999	Craig MacLean	Craig Percival	Neil Campbell	Manchester Velodrome	
2000	Craig MacLean	Chris Hoy	Andy Slater	Manchester Velodrome	
2001	Craig MacLean	Andy Slater	Alwyn McMath	Manchester Velodrome	
2002	Andy Slater	Anton Quist	Adam Welch	Manchester Velodrome	
2003	Ross Edgar	Jamie Staff	Barney Storey	Manchester Velodrome	
2004	Ross Edgar	Matthew Haynes	Marco Librizzi	Manchester Velodrome	
2005	Craig MacLean	Matthew Crampton	Marco Librizzi	Manchester Velodrome	
2006	Craig MacLean	Ross Edgar	Chris Hoy	Manchester Velodrome	
2007	Ross Edgar	Chris Hoy	Matthew Crampton	Manchester Velodrome	
2008	David Daniell	Christian Lyte	Matthew Crampton	Manchester Velodrome	
2009	Chris Hoy	Matthew Crampton	Jason Kenny	Manchester Velodrome	
2010	Jason Kenny	Matthew Crampton	Chris Hoy	Manchester Velodrome	
2011	Chris Hoy	David Daniell	Jason Kenny	Manchester Velodrome	
2012	Callum Skinner	Lewis Oliva	Matthew Crampton	Manchester Velodrome	
2013	Jason Kenny	Peter Mitchell	Matthew Crampton	Manchester Velodrome	
2014	Callum Skinner	Matthew Crampton	Philip Hindes	Manchester Velodrome	
2015	Lewis Oliva	Matt Rotherham	Jonathan Mitchell	Manchester Velodrome	
2017	Ryan Owens	Joseph Truman	Lewis Oliva	Manchester Velodrome	
2018	Jack Carlin	Lewis Oliva	Matt Rotherham	Manchester Velodrome	
2019	Joseph Truman	Jason Kenny	Hamish Turnbull	Manchester Velodrome	
2020	Hamish Turnbull	Ali Fielding	Alex Spratt	Manchester Velodrome	
2021 not held due to Covid-19
2022	Jack Carlin	Joseph Truman	Hamish Turnbull	Geraint Thomas Velodrome	
2023	Harry Ledingham-Horn	Jack Carlin	Matt Rotherham	Geraint Thomas Velodrome	
2024	Peter Mitchell	Marcus Hiley	Harry Ledingham-Horn	Manchester Velodrome	
2025	Matt Richardson	Peter Mitchell	Marcus Hiley	Manchester Velodrome	
2026	Matt Richardson	Harry Ledingham-Horn	Oliver Pettifer	Manchester Velodrome	

A = Amateur event / P = Professional event

== Women's Senior Race ==
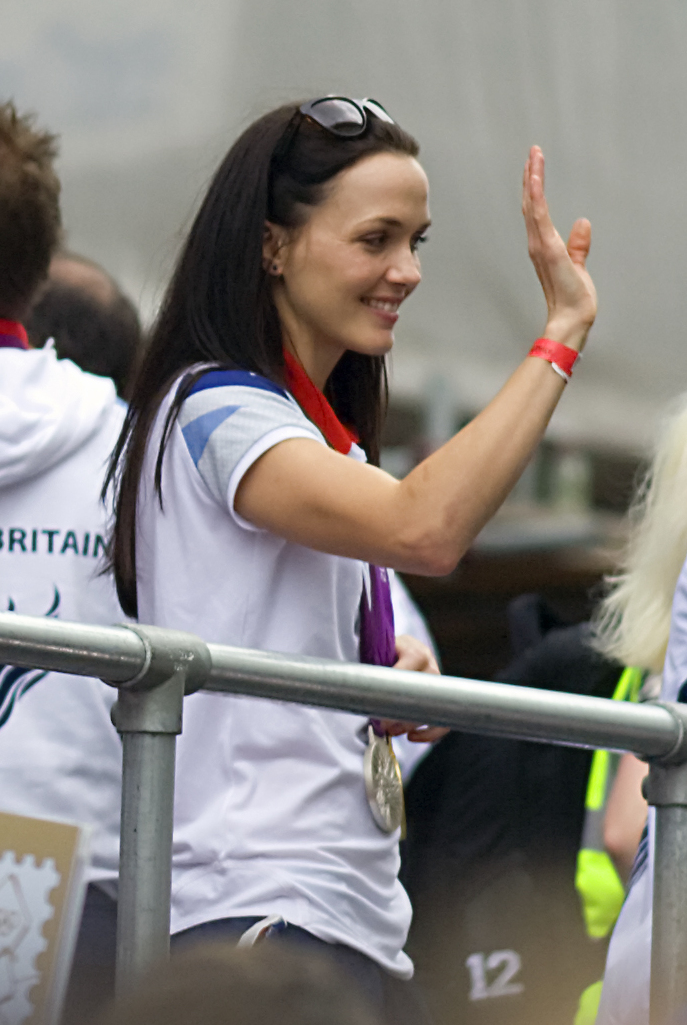
Victoria Pendleton, nine time winner

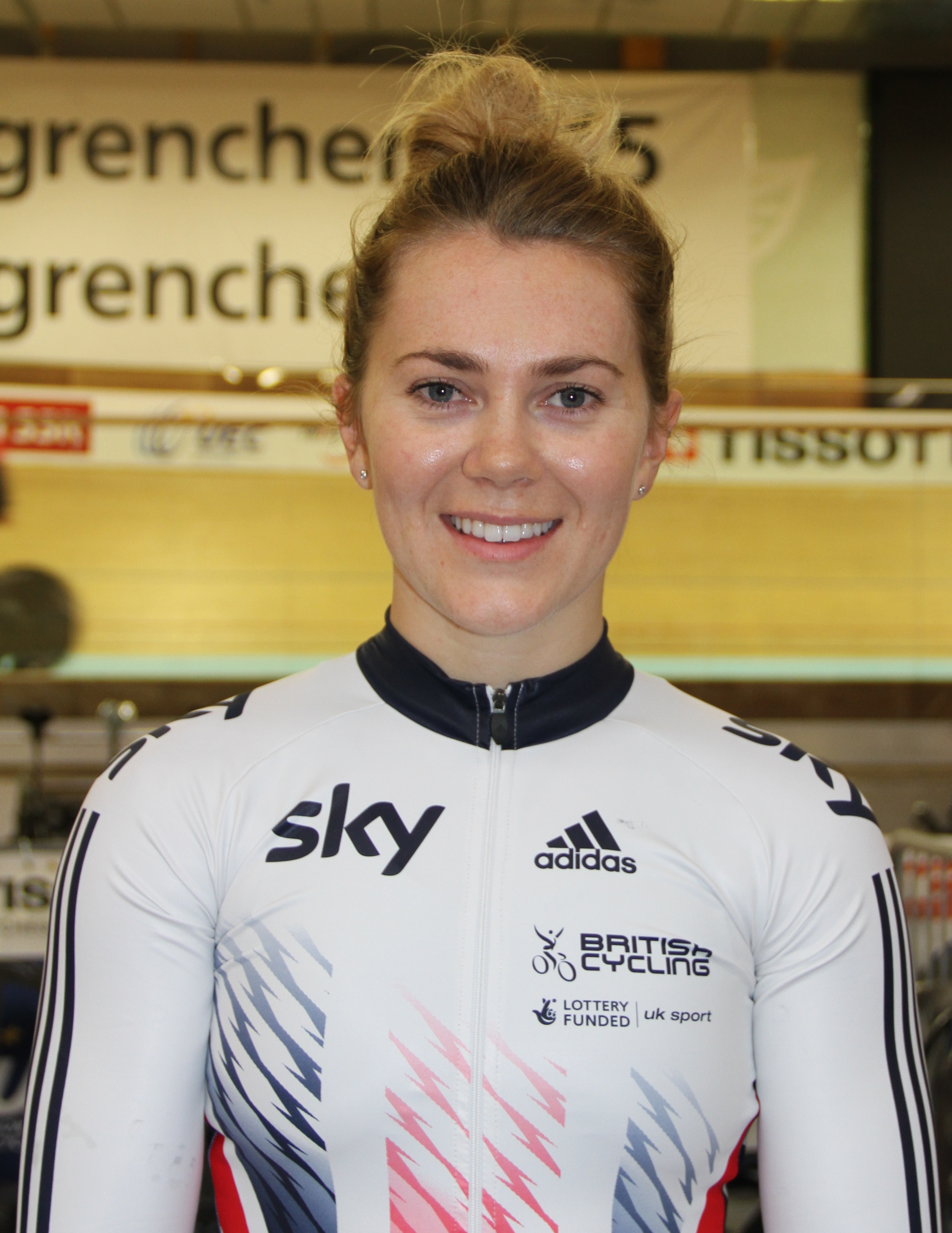
Jess Varnish

Year	Gold	Silver	Bronze	Ref
1972	Faith Murray	Jayne Westbury	SF- Anne Bailey	
1973	Faith Murray	Jayne Westbury	Val Rushworth	
1974	Faith Murray	Jayne Westbury	Gwynneth Barnes	
1975	Faith Murray	Gwynneth Barnes	Jayne Westbury	
1976	Faith Murray	Gwynneth Barnes	Brenda Atkinson	
1977	Faith Murray	Catherine Swinnerton	Brenda Atkinson	
1978	Brenda Atkinson	Catherine Swinnerton	Lynda Allen	
1979	Brenda Atkinson	Faith Murray	Catherine Swinnerton	
1980	Brenda Atkinson	Hilda Barrie	Catherine Swinnerton	
1981	Ann Davey	Brenda Atkinson	Jackie Harris	
1982	Brenda Atkinson	Ann Davey	Susan Lee	
1983	Sally Hodge	Jackie Harris	Catherine Swinnerton	
1984	Alison Pockett	Sally Hodge		
1985	Sally Hodge	Alison Pockett	Jackie Harris	
1986	Louise Jones	Sally Hodge	Natalie Soens	
1987	Louise Jones	Jackie Harris	Alison Pockett	
1988	Louise Jones	Jackie Harris		
1989	Louise Jones	Claire Rushworth		
1990	Louise Jones	Claire Rushworth		
1991	Louise Jones	Claire Rushworth	Wendy Everson	
1992	Wendy Everson	Claire Rushworth	Sally Hodge	
1993	Sally Boyden	Gill Danson	Isla Rowntree	
1994	Wendy Everson	Sally Boyden	Lynn Minchinton	
1995	Wendy Everson	Sally Boyden	Emma Davies	
1996	Wendy Everson	Megan Hughes		
1997	Wendy Everson	Michelle Ward	Megan Hughes	
1998	Wendy Everson	Julie Forrester	Melanie Szubrycht	
1999	Wendy Everson	Denise Hampson	Victoria Pendleton	
2000	Wendy Everson	Denise Hampson	Victoria Pendleton	
2001	Denise Hampson	Victoria Pendleton	Emily Forde	
2002	Victoria Pendleton	Denise Hampson	Kate Cullen	
2003	Victoria Pendleton	Denise Hampson	Kate Cullen	
2004	Victoria Pendleton	Kate Cullen	Claire Gross	
2005	Victoria Pendleton	Lorna Webb	Janet Birkmyre	
2006	Victoria Pendleton	Anna Blyth	Lucy Ayres	
2007	Victoria Pendleton	Anna Blyth	Jess Varnish	
2008	Victoria Pendleton	Anna Blyth	Helen Scott	
2009	Victoria Pendleton	Jessica Varnish	Becky James	
2010	Victoria Pendleton	Becky James	Jessica Varnish	
2011	Becky James	Jessica Varnish	Victoria Williamson	
2012	Becky James	Victoria Williamson	Dannielle Khan	
2013	Jessica Varnish	Victoria Williamson	Katy Marchant	
2014	Jessica Varnish	Katy Marchant	Victoria Williamson	
2015	Katy Marchant	Becky James	Victoria Williamson	
2017	Jessica Crampton	Rachel James	Sophie Capewell	
2018	Katy Marchant	Sophie Capewell	Katie Archibald	
2019	Sophie Capewell	Jessica Crampton	Katie Archibald	
2020	Lauren Bate	Millicent Tanner	Lauren Bell	
2021 not held due to Covid-19
2022	Rhian Edmunds	Sophie Capewell	Emma Finucane	
2023	Emma Finucane	Sophie Capewell	Lauren Bell	
2024	Lauren Bell	Rhian Edmunds	Georgette Rand	
2025	Lauren Bell	Rhian Edmunds	Georgette Rand	
2026	Emma Finucane	Iona Moir	Rhian Edmunds	

== Junior ==
Extended content

Men's Junior Race

Year	Gold	Silver	Bronze
1963	Dave Burwood	Geoff Smith	Dave Watkins
1966	Andy King		Graham Rees
1967	Ian Roberts	Graham Rees	
1977	Jim Langmead	Ian Donohue	Gareth Morgan
1978	Alex Robertson	Peter McGowan	Russell Williams
1999	James Taylor	David Heald	P Chilton
2000	Jon Pettit	Nathan Harman	Ross Edgar
2001	Ross Edgar	Matthew Haynes	Tom White
2003	Matthew Crampton	Mark Cavendish	Jak Kenton-Spraggen
2004	Matthew Crampton	Jak Kenton-Spraggen	Jason Kenny
2005	Jason Kenny	Steve Harrison	James Griffin
2006	Jason Kenny	David Daniell	Christian Lyte
2007	David Daniell	Peter Mitchell	Christian Lyte
2008	Steven Hill	Luc Jones	Peter Mitchell
2009	Kian Emadi	John Paul	Kevin Stewart
2010	John Paul	Kian Emadi	Lewis Oliva
2011	John Paul	Matthew Rotherham	Thomas Baker
2012	Sean Mayer	Andrew Leveton	Sassan Emadi
2013	Thomas Scammell	Max Nethell	Leon Gledhill
2014	Joseph Truman	Jack Carlin	Jack Payne
2015	Joseph Truman	Jack Carlin	Alex Jolliffe
2016	Alex Jolliffe	Hamish Turnbull	Lewis Stewart
2017	Hamish Turnbull	Lewis Stewart	Caleb Hill

Women's Junior Race

Year	Gold	Silver	Bronze
2002	Katherine Hill	Samantha Colley	Jacqui Marshall
2003	Susan Massey	Samantha Colley	Jo Tindley
2004	Susan Massey	Bridie Hindle	Rachel Ball
2005	Anna Blyth	Lucy Ayres	Katie Curtis
2006	Anna Blyth	Lucy Ayres	Joanne Wilman
2007	Jess Varnish	Becky James	Helen Scott
2008	Jess Varnish	Helen Scott	Laura Trott
2009	Results missing, not known if event was held.		
2010	Victoria Williamson	Jessica Crampton	Hannah Barnes
2011	Victoria Williamson	Jessica Crampton	Imogen Farlie
2012	Dannielle Khan	Jessica Crampton	Rosie Blount
2013	Dannielle Khan	Sophie Capewell	Ellie Coster
2014	Sophie Capewell	Ellie Coster	Lauren Bate
2015	Sophie Capewell	Lauren Bate	Rebecca Doman
2016	Sophie Capewell	Lauren Bate	Amber King
2017	Lauren Bate	Georgia Hilleard	Aleshia Mellor

== Youth ==
Extended content

Male Youth Race

Year	Gold	Silver	Bronze
1977	Alex Robertson		
1991	Geraint Day	Andrew Mummery	
1995	Stephen MacMillan		
1998	Rhys Gruffydd	Daniel Sims	George Holland
1999	Ross Edgar	Richard Sutcliffe	Steve Harrison
2000	Matthew Haynes	Paul Riley	Russell Holland
2001	Neil Cooper	Geraint Thomas	Jason Cattermole
2003	Tom Smith	James Griffin	Ed Parker
2004	Jason Kenny	Shane Charlton	Andrew Fenn
2005	Christian Lyte	David Daniell	Joshua Hargreaves
2006	Peter Mitchell	Steven Hill	Tom Buck
2007	Luc Jones	Kevin Stewart	Kian Emadi
2008	Callum Skinner	Kian Emadi	Lewis Oliva
2009	John Paul	Matthew Rotherham	Robert Lambton
2010	James Berryman	Matthew Rotherham	Alex Minting
2011	Christopher Lawless	Oliver Wood	Ryan Whatmough
2012	Jack Hoyle	Thomas Rotherham	Thomas Scammell
2013	Joseph Truman	Thomas Rotherham	Jack Payne
2014	Hamish Turnbull	Frank Longstaff	Alex Joliffe
2015	Hamish Turnbull	Alistair Fielding	Lewis Stewart
2016	Caleb Hill	Alistair Fielding	Ethan Vernon
2017	James Bunting	Daniel Cooper	Jacob Dixon

Female Youth Race

Year	Gold	Silver	Bronze
1998	Nicole Cooke	Laura Hewitt	Femke van Schelven
1999	Nicole Cooke	Gina Chapman	Laura Bissell
2000	Kimberley Walsh	Kirsteen Lawrie	Nicki Lloyd
2001	Katherine Hill	Rachel Ball	Nicki Lloyd
2003	Kimberley Blythe	Becky Figgitt	Anna Blyth
2004	Anna Blyth	Katie Curtis	Bridie Hindle
2005	Jess Varnish	Lara Wann	Joanne Wilman
2006	Jess Varnish	Becky James	Helen Scott
2007	Becky James	Joanne Wilman	Laura Trott
2008	Hannah Barnes	Laura Trott	Emily Kay
2009	Hannah Barnes	Victoria Williamson	Emily Kay
2010	Jessica Crampton	Sarah Crowley	Megan Boyd
2011	Dannielle Khan	Ellie Coster	Emily Kay
2012	Sophie Capewell	Ellie Coster	Hannah Blount
2013	Sophie Capewell	Grace Garner	Emily Capewell
2014	Sophie Capewell	Lauren Bate-Lowe	Rebecca Raybould
2015	Lauren Bate-Lowe	Amber King	Georgia Hilleard
2016	Ella Barnwell	Ellie Russell	Esme Niblett
2017	Aleshia Mellor	Zoë Bäckstedt	Ella Barnwell
