= British National Tandem Sprint Championships =

British cycling event

The British National Tandem Sprint Championships are held annually, organised by British Cycling.

== Results ==
=== Senior ===
Year	First	Second	Third	Ref
1924	Manchester Wheelers / Rover CC; John Sibbit; A White	Marlborough AC; H E Fuller; L Gordon	Derby RCC; Harry Wyld; Ronald Wyld	
1925				
1926				
1927				
1928	Manchester Wheelers; John Sibbit; Ernest Chambers			
1929	Manchester Wheelers; John Sibbit; Ernest Chambers			
1930	Manchester Wheelers; John Sibbit; Ernest Chambers			
1931	Manchester Wheelers; John Sibbit; Wilf Higgins			
1932	Manchester Wheelers / Norwich ABC; John Sibbit; Dennis Horn	Polytechnic CC; Ernest Chambers; Stanley Chambers		
1933	Belle Vue CC / Imperial Wheelers; A G Sier; R Meller	Polytechnic CC / Hove Borough Police; Ernest Chambers; Stanley Chambers	Manchester Wheelers / Norwich ABC; John Sibbit; Dennis Horn	
1934				
1935				
1936	Manchester Wheelers; John Sibbit; Ernest Chambers			
1937	Manchester Wheelers; John Sibbit; Ernest Chambers			
1946	Norwood Paragon; Jim Hampshire; Stan Harrison			
1947	Manchester Wheelers; Reg Harris; Alan Bannister			
1948	Manchester Wheelers; Reg Harris; Alan Bannister			
1949	Manchester Wheelers; Len Jackson; Alan Bannister	Norwood Paragon /East Midlands Clarion; John Dennis; R Meadwell		
1950	Manchester Wheelers; Len Jackson; Alan Bannister	Actonia; Donald McKellow; Ron Kitchenham		
1951	Manchester Wheelers; Len Jackson; Alan Bannister			
1952	Manchester Wheelers; Alan Bannister			
1953				
1954				
1955				
1956				
1957				
1958			Clarence Wheelers; Alan Jacob; Brian Elliott	
1959				
1960				
1961				
1962	Ian Alsop; Roger Whitfield			
1963				
1964		Ian Alsop; Brian Dacey		
1965		Ian Alsop; Tony Gowland		
1967		Ian Alsop; Tony Gowland		
1968	Ian Alsop; Geoff Cooke	Tony Brockhurst; Pete Mugglestone	Alan C. Johnson; Keith Downing	
1969	Pete Mugglestone; Tony Brockhurst	Bob Bicknell; Fred Booker	Geoff Lazell; Jim Middlemore	
1970	Pete Mugglestone; Tony Brockhurst	Alan C.Johnson; Jim Middlemore	John Hatfield; Jeffrey Davies	
1971	David Rowe; Geoff Cooke	Pete Mugglestone; Tony Brockhurst	Jim Middlemore; Brian Dacey	
1972	David Rowe; Geoff Cooke	Jim Middlemore; Geoff Lazell	Colin Armstrong; Russell Snowden	
1973	Ernie Crutchlow; Peter Wrighte	Geoff Cooke; Dave Rowe	John Hatfield; John Tudor	
1974	Ernie Crutchlow; Geoff Cooke	Dave Le Grys; David Rowe	Tony Brockhurst; Max Grant	
1975	Paul Medhurst; Geoff Cooke	Dave Le Grys; David Rowe	Tony Brockhurst; Max Grant	
1976	Dave Le Grys; David Rowe	Paul Medhurst; Geoff Cooke	Paul Gerrard; Hugh Cameron	
1977	Trevor Gadd; Steve Cronshaw	Dave Le Grys; John Tudor	Paul Gerrard; Andy Nickeas	
1978	Trevor Gadd; Steve Cronshaw	Paul Swinnerton; Peter Humphries	Jim Langmead; Brian Fudge	
1979	Paul Sydenham; Steve Cronshaw	Paul Swinnerton; Peter Humphries	Brad Thurrell; Gary Jones	
1980	Manchester Wheelers; Terry Tinsley; Paul Sydenham	Brad Thurrell; Gary Sadler	Andy Hayes; Peter Humphries	
1981	Manchester Wheelers; Terry Tinsley; Paul Sydenham		Denis Lightfoot	
1982	Manchester Wheelers; Terry Tinsley; Paul Sydenham			
1983	Paul Swinnerton; Paul Sydenham	David Marsh; Richard Grace	John Arkwright; Mark Minting	
1984	Michael Borman; Chris Pyatt	David Marsh; Richard Grace	David Mayes; Peter Green	
1985	Michael Borman; Chris Pyatt	Karl McHugh; Paul McHugh	Eddie Alexander; Steve Paulding	
1986	Michael Borman; Chris Pyatt	Stewart Brydon; Steve Paulding	Rob Mitchell; John Saysell	
1987	Eddie Alexander; Stewart Brydon	Michael Borman; Chris Pyatt	Dave Marsh; Brian Fudge	
1988	Eddie Alexander; Stewart Brydon	Michael Borman; Chris Pyatt	Michael Garratt; Gary Hibbert	
1989	Peter Boyd; Gary Hibbert	Michael Borman; Chris Pyatt		
1990	Peter Boyd; Gary Hibbert	Chris Pyatt; Martin Phillips	Eddie Alexander; Chris Ransome	
1991	Peter Boyd; Gary Hibbert	Martin Phillips; Mark Barry		
1992	Clayton Velo; Peter Boyd; Gary Hibbert	Stoke AC; Chris Pyatt; Martin Phillips	Kirkby CC / Ellan Vannin CC; John Saysell; Adrian Mooney	
1993	Clayton Velo; Peter Boyd; Gary Hibbert	City of Edinburgh/Wembley RC; Marco Librizzi; John Saysell	Stoke AC; Chris Pyatt; Martin Phillips	
1994	Clayton Velo; Peter Boyd; Gary Hibbert	Leo RC & Stoke AC; L Rowe; Martin Phillips	City of Edinburgh; Marco Librizzi; Steve Paulding	
1995	CC Lancashire; Peter Boyd; Gary Hibbert	Leo RC & Stoke AC; L Rowe; Martin Phillips	Newark Castle/Chesterfield Coureurs; Richard Kennedy; Graham Hobson	
1996				
1997				
1998	Peter Boyd; Neil Campbell			
1999	VC St Raphael; Andy Slater; Mark Whittaker			
2000	Peter Jacques		Stefan Collins	
2001				
2002	VC St Raphael; Peter Boyd; Dave Heald	Yasumitsu Schlapp; Jon Norfolk; Ian George	Yasumitsu Schlapp; Douglas Northcott; Joby Ingram Dodd	
2003	VC St Raphael; Barney Storey; Ben Elliott	VC St Raphael; Peter Boyd; Dave Heald	Chesterfield Coureurs / Birmingham CC; Richard Kennedy; Martin Osman	
2004	VC St Raphael; Peter Boyd; Dave Heald	VC St Raphael; Barney Storey; Dan Gordon	Bournemouth Jubilee Wheelers/Ciclos Uno; Rob Jeffries; John Saysell	
2005				
2006	VC St Raphael / Yasumitsu Schlapp; Barney Storey; Antony Kappes	Yasumitsu Schlapp; Paul Hunter; Gwyn Carless	VC St Raphael / Yasumitsu Schlapp; Peter Boyd; Phil Huff	
2007	Yasumitsu Schlapp; Anthony Gill; Simon Churton	VC St Raphael/PCA Ciclos Uno; Ben Elliott; John Saysell	Yasumitsu Schlapp; Jon Norfolk; Anthony Kappes	
2008	Yasumitsu Schlapp/Clitheroe; Jon Norfolk; Anthony Kappes	Yasumitsu Schlapp; Anthony Gill; Simon Churton	VC St Raphael/PCA Ciclos Uno; Ben Elliott; John Saysell	
2009	City of Edinburgh; Matthew Haynes; Bruce Croall	VC St Raphael/PCA Ciclos Uno; Ben Elliott; John Saysell	Science In Sport; Simon Jackson; Dave Readle	
2010	VC St Raphael; Neil Fachie; Barney Storey	Liverpool Mercury; Simon Jackson; Craig MacLean	Yasumitsu Schlapp; Anthony Kappes; Dave Readle	
2011	Yasumitsu Schlapp/VC St Raphael; Anthony Kappes; Barney Storey	VC St Raphael; Ben Elliott; Rowan Elliott	VC St Raphael; Peter Boyd; Dave Heald	
2012	Ythan CC/VC St Raphael; Neil Fachie; Barney Storey	City of Edinburgh; Kenny Ayre; Bruce Croall	VC St Raphael/North Road; Ben Elliott; John Saysell	
2013	London Dynamo/Sportcity Velo; Craig MacLean; Matt Rotherham	Ythan CC/Performance CC; Neil Fachie; Peter Mitchell	VC St Raphael; Peter Boyd; Dave Heald	
2014	Yasumitsu Schlapp/Performance CC; Anthony Kappes; Peter Mitchell	Brooks Cycles/Sportcity Velo; Philip Houlton; Thomas Rotherham	Newport Velo Youth Cycling; Matthew Ellis; Ieuan Williams	
2015	Sportcity Velo; Matt Rotherham; Thomas Rotherham	Black Line; Neil Fachie; Peter Mitchell	VC St Raphael; Ben Elliott; Andrew Leveton	
2016	VC St Raphael; Ben Elliott; Andrew Leveton	Brooks Cycles; Philip Houlton; Chris Heaton	City of Edinburgh; Matthew Haynes; Bruce Croall	
2019	Sportcity Velo; Matt Rotherham; Helen Scott	VC St Raphael; Joshua Dunham; Jack Garner	VC St Raphael; Ben Elliott; Alan Peet	
2020 & 2021 cancelled due to the COVID-19 pandemic				
2022	Wales Racing Academy; Steffan Lloyd; Alex Pope	VC St Raphael/Chorley CC; Peter Boyd; Megan Boyd	Wales Racing Academy; Amy Cole; Nia Holt	
2023	Matt Rotherham; Sophie Unwin	Joshua Dunham; Thomas Wing	Peter Boyd; Megan Boyd	
2024	David Heald; Peter Boyd	Sean Sleigh; Andrew Mason	Thomas Boyd	
