= 1981 British National Track Championships =

- Venue: Leicester, England
- Date(s): 31 July – 8 August 1981
- Velodrome: Leicester Velodrome

The 1981 British National Track Championships were a series of track cycling competitions held from 31 July – 8 August 1981 at the Leicester Velodrome.

The weather caused a major problem with cancellations of many events.

== Medal summary ==
=== Men's Events ===
Year	Gold	Silver	Bronze
Time Trial	Terry Tinsley	Shaun Wallace	Brad Thurrell
Amateur Sprint	Paul Swinnerton	Terry Tinsley	Piers Hewitt
Professional Sprint	Ian Hallam	Dave Watkins	Tony James
Prof Individual Pursuit	Tony Doyle	Ian Hallam	Ian Banbury
Amateur Individual Pursuit	Dave Akam	Shaun Wallace	Steve Denton
Team pursuit	Manchester Wheelers; Hugh Cameron; Gary Cresswell; Greg Newton; Darryl Webster	VC Europa	
Amateur 50 km Points	Glen Mitchell	Steve Joughin	Darryl Webster
Amateur 20 km Scratch	Glen Mitchell	Paul Doel	Gary Sadler
Madison	Paul Curran & Stuart Morris	Gary Cresswell & Hugh Cameron	Denis Lightfoot
Professional Omnium	Ian Hallam	Steve Heffernan	Tony Doyle
Tandem	Terry Tinsley & Paul Sydenham		Denis Lightfoot
Derny	Paul Gerrard	Des Fretwell	Mick Coles

=== Women's Events ===
Year	Gold	Silver	Bronze
Sprint	Ann Davey	Brenda Atkinson	Jackie Harris
Individual Pursuit	Mandy Jones	Catherine Swinnerton	Pauline Strong
