= 1975 British National Track Championships =

- Venue: Leicester, England
- Date(s): 26 July – 2 August 1975
- Velodrome: Leicester Velodrome

The 1975 British National Track Championships were a series of track cycling competitions held from 26 July – 2 August 1975 at the Leicester Velodrome. The Championships were sponsored by Newmark.

== Medal summary ==
=== Men's Events ===
Event	Gold	Silver	Bronze
Time Trial	Ian Hallam	Paul Medhurst	Trevor Gadd
Amateur Sprint	Paul Medhurst	Dave Rowe	Dave Le Grys
Professional Sprint	Trevor Bull	Reg Harris	Alan Williams
Prof Individual Pursuit	Phil Bayton	Nigel Dean	John McMillan
Amateur Individual Pursuit	Steve Heffernan		
Team Pursuit	Archer Cutty Sark RC; Maurice Burton; Robin Crocker; Steve Heffernan; Alaric Gayfer	34 Nomads	Birmingham RC
Amateur 20 km Scratch	Ian Hallam	Robin Crocker	Gary Cresswell
80 km Madison	Ian Hallam & Mick Bennett	Maurice Burton & Steve Heffernan	Gary Cresswell & Hugh Cameron
Tandem	Paul Medhurst & Geoff Cooke	Dave Le Grys & David Rowe	Tony Brockhurst & Max Grant
50 km Stayers	Roy Cox	Rik Notley	John Hall

=== Women's Events ===
Event	Gold	Silver	Bronze
Sprint	Faith Murray	Gwynneth Barnes	Jane Westbury
Individual Pursuit	Denise Burton	Maggie Gordon-Smith	Carol Barton
