= 1980 British National Track Championships =

- Venue: Leicester, England
- Date(s): 19–22 August 1980
- Velodrome: Leicester Velodrome

The 1980 British National Track Championships were a series of track cycling competitions held from 19–22 August 1980 at the Leicester Velodrome.

The Championships were held slightly later than usual because of the 1980 Summer Olympics.

== Medal summary ==
=== Men's Events ===
Event	Gold	Silver	Bronze
Time Trial	Gary Sadler	Terry Tinsley	Russell Oliver
Amateur Sprint	Terry Tinsley	Gary Sadler	Dave Le Grys
Professional Sprint	Ernie Crutchlow	Ian Hallam	Dave Watkins
Prof Individual Pursuit	Tony Doyle	Ian Hallam	Ian Banbury
Amateur Individual Pursuit	Sean Yates	Dave Akam	Shaun Wallace
Team pursuit	VC Europa; Piers Hewitt; Roy Crombie; Steve Denton; Gary Sadler	Altrincham; Nigel Redmile; John Herety; Ian Binder; Ian Donohue	Gemini BC; Dave Akam; Paul Dennis; Steve Homewood; Steve White
Amateur 50 km Points	Glen Mitchell	Tony James	Kenny Gray
Amateur 20 km Scratch	Nigel Redmile	Glen Mitchell	Sean Yates
Madison	Dave Akam & Tony James	Glen Mitchell & Sean Yates	Gary Cresswell & Hugh Cameron
Professional Omnium	Ian Hallam	Mick Bennett	Steve Heffernan
Tandem	Terry Tinsley & Paul Sydenham	Brad Thurrell & Gary Sadler	Andy Hayes & Peter Humphries
Derny	Paul Gerrard	Des Fretwell	Rik Notley

=== Women's Events ===
Event	Gold	Silver	Bronze
Sprint	Brenda Atkinson	Hilda Barrie	Catherine Swinnerton
Individual Pursuit	Mandy Jones	Pauline Cave	Catherine Swinnerton
