= 1973 British National Track Championships =

- Venue: Leicester, England
- Date(s): 28 July – 4 August 1973
- Velodrome: Leicester Velodrome

The 1973 British National Track Championships were a series of track cycling competitions held from 28 July – 4 August 1973 at the Leicester Velodrome.

== Medal summary ==
=== Men's Events ===
Event	Gold	Silver	Bronze
Time Trial	Ian Hallam	Mick Bennett	Rik Evans
Amateur Sprint	Ernie Crutchlow	Geoff Cooke	Dave Watkins
Professional Sprint	Reg Barnett	Trevor Bull	Geoff Wiles
Prof Individual Pursuit	Dave Lloyd	Jock Kerr	Reg Smith
Amateur Individual Pursuit	Ian Hallam	Willi Moore	Mick Bennett
Team pursuit	Birmingham RC	34 Nomads	Archer RC; Alaric Gayfer; Steve Heffernan; Hall; Price; Dave Densley
Madison	Ian Hallam & Mick Bennett	Steve Heffernan	
Tandem	Ernie Crutchlow & Peter Wrighte	Geoff Cooke & Dave Rowe	John Hatfield & John Tudor
50 km Stayers	Roy Cox	Phil Buckley	John Hall

=== Women's Events ===
Event	Gold	Silver	Bronze
Sprint	Faith Murray	Jane Westbury	Val Rushworth
Individual Pursuit	Beryl Burton	Carol Barton	
