= 1979 British National Track Championships =

- Venue: Leicester, England
- Date(s): July–August 1979
- Velodrome: Leicester Velodrome

The 1979 British National Track Championships were a series of track cycling competitions held from late July to early August 1979 at the Leicester Velodrome.

== Medal summary ==
=== Men's Events ===
Event	Gold	Silver	Bronze
Time Trial	Paul Swinnerton	Terry Tinsley	Peter McGowan
Amateur Sprint	Steve Cronshaw	Terry Tinsley	Paul Swinnerton
Professional Sprint	Ian Hallam	Dave Rowe	Ian Banbury
Prof Individual Pursuit	Ian Hallam	Ian Banbury	Steve Heffernan
Amateur Individual Pursuit			
Team pursuit	34 Nomads; Ron Keeble; Peter Hamilton; Tony James; Glen Mitchell	Altrincham; Mike Williams; John Herety; Ian Donohue; Ian Binder	Tim Stevens; Sean Yates; Steven Sefton; Roland O'Donnell
Amateur 50 km Points	Tony Doyle	Tony James	Glen Mitchell
Amateur 20 km Scratch	Gary Cresswell	Mick Davies	Graeme Nisbet
Madison	Tony Doyle & Glen Mitchell	Gary Cresswell & Hugh Cameron	Paul Fennell & Tony James
Professional Omnium	Ian Hallam	Mick Bennett	Steve Heffernan
Tandem	Steve Cronshaw & Paul Sydenham	Paul Swinnerton & Peter Humphries	Brad Thurrell & Gary Jones
Derny	Alan Johnson	Paul Gerrard	Des Fretwell

=== Women's Events ===
Event	Gold	Silver	Bronze
Sprint	Brenda Atkinson	Faith Murray	Catherine Swinnerton
Individual Pursuit	Brenda Atkinson	Anne Collingwood	Catherine Swinnerton
