= 1976 British National Track Championships =

- Venue: Leicester, England
- Date: 7–14 August 1976
- Velodrome: Leicester Velodrome

The 1976 British National Track Championships were a series of track cycling competitions held from 7–14 August 1976 at the Leicester Velodrome.

== Medal summary ==
=== Men's Events ===
Event	Gold	Silver	Bronze
Time Trial	Ian Hallam	Trevor Gadd	Andy Coady
Amateur Sprint	John Tudor	Dave Le Grys	Alan Coady
Professional Sprint	Alan Williams	Trevor Bull	Keith Hanson
Prof Individual Pursuit	Phil Bayton	John McMillan	Rhys Bateman
Amateur Individual Pursuit	Steve Heffernan	Ian Banbury	Ian Hallam
Team pursuit	Archer Cutty Sark; Alaric Gayfer; Steve Heffernan; Robin Croker; Brian Milner	Teesside Clarion; Martin Stainsby; Hugh Cameron; Gary Cresswell; Stuart Morris	34 Nomads; Dave Peachey; Glen Mitchell; Peter Hamilton; Peter Malyon
Amateur 20 km Scratch	Ian Hallam	Paul Fennell	Gary Cresswell
80 km Madison	Steve Heffernan & Paul Medhurst	Gary Cresswell & Hugh Cameron	Paul Fennell & Tony James
Tandem	Dave Le Grys & David Rowe	Paul Medhurst & Geoff Cooke	Paul Gerrard & Hugh Cameron
20 km Motor Paced	Rik Notley	Alan Johnson	Richard Dixon

=== Women's Events ===
Event	Gold	Silver	Bronze
Sprint	Faith Murray	Gwynneth Barnes	Brenda Atkinson
Individual Pursuit	Denise Burton	Carol Barton	Terrie Riley
