= 1972 British National Track Championships =

- Venue: various
- Date: Summer 1972

The 1972 British National Track Championships were a series of track cycling competitions held during the summer of 1972.

== Venues ==
- Leicester Velodrome - (amateur sprint & pursuit, stayers, women's sprint)
- Middlesbrough, Cleveland and Redcar (time trial)
- Nottingham - (tandem)
- Wolverhampton - (pro sprint & pursuit)

== Medal summary ==
=== Men's Events ===
Event	Gold	Silver	Bronze
Time Trial	Mick Bennett	Dave Rowe	Steve Heffernan
Amateur Sprint	Ernie Crutchlow	Dave Rowe	
Professional Sprint	Reg Barnett	Trevor Bull	Tony Gowland
Prof Individual Pursuit	Reg Smith	Alan Lloyd	Jock Kerr
Amateur Individual Pursuit	Ian Hallam	Willi Moore	Mick Bennett
Team pursuit			
Madison	Tom Moloney (Aus) & Murray Hill (Aus)		
Tandem	David Rowe & Geoff Cooke	Jim Middlemore & Geoff Lazell	Colin Armstrong & Russell Snowden
Stayers	Roy Cox	Tom Moloney (Aus)	Morgan Jackson

=== Women's Events ===
Event	Gold	Silver	Bronze
Sprint	Faith Murray	Jayne Westbury	
Individual Pursuit	Beryl Burton		
