= 1971 British National Track Championships =

- Venue: various
- Date(s): Summer 1971

The 1971 British National Track Championships were a series of track cycling competitions held during the summer of 1971.

== Medal summary ==
=== Men's Events ===
Event	Venue	Gold	Silver	Bronze
Time Trial	Leicester Velodrome	Mick Bennett; Tony Brockhurst		
Amateur Sprint		Ernie Crutchlow		
Professional Sprint	Salford Park, Birmingham	Gordon Johnson	Reg Barnett	Reg Harris
Pro Individual Pursuit		Reg Smith		
Am Individual Pursuit	Welwyn (Herefordshire)	Ian Hallam	Ray Ward	Alan Lloyd
Team pursuit	Quibell Park Stadium	Birmingham RCC; Alan Lloyd; John Patston; Bob Jones; Dave Bond	34 Nomads	Kirkby
Madison	London	Geoff Wiles; Dave Nie	Ray Barker; Danny Horton	Trevor Bull; Tony Gowland
Tandem	Leicester Velodrome	David Rowe; Geoff Cooke	Pete Mugglestone; Tony Brockhurst	
Stayers	Leicester Velodrome	Reg Barnett	Sid Barras	Tony Gowland
Motor Paced	Leicester Velodrome	Roy Cox & Bertus de Graf		

=== Women's Events ===
Event	Venue	Gold	Silver	Bronze
Individual Pursuit		Beryl Burton	Bernadette Swinnerton	Maureen Wroe or Maggie Gordon-Smith
