= 1974 British National Track Championships =

Series of track cycling competitions

- Venue: Leicester, England
- Date(s): late July to early August 1974
- Velodrome: Leicester Velodrome

The 1974 British National Track Championships were a series of track cycling competitions held from late July to early August 1974 at the Leicester Velodrome. Reg Harris won the professional pursuit title aged 54.

== Medal summary ==
=== Men's Events ===
Event	Gold	Silver	Bronze
Time Trial	Ian Hallam	Mick Bennett	Willi Moore
Amateur Sprint	Malcolm Hill (Aus)	Geoff Cooke	Dave Le Grys
Professional Sprint	Reg Harris	Trevor Bull	Nigel Dean
Prof Individual Pursuit	Dave Lloyd	Nigel Dean	Jock Kerr
Amateur Individual Pursuit	Ian Hallam	Steve Heffernan	Willi Moore
Team pursuit	Archer RC	Birmingham RC	34 Nomads
Amateur 20 km Scratch	Maurice Burton	Steve Heffernan	Malcolm Hall
Madison	cancelled due to lack of entries		
Tandem	Ernie Crutchlow & Geoff Cooke	Dave Le Grys & David Rowe	Tony Brockhurst & Max Grant
50 km Stayers	Roy Cox	Rik Notley	John Hall

=== Women's Events ===
Event	Gold	Silver	Bronze
Sprint	Faith Murray	Jane Westbury	Gwynneth Barnes
Individual Pursuit	Beryl Burton		
