= 1983 British National Track Championships =

- Venue: Leicester, England
- Date(s): 30 July – 7 August 1983
- Velodrome: Leicester Velodrome

The 1983 British National Track Championships were a series of track cycling competitions held from 30 July – 7 August 1983 at the Leicester Velodrome.

== Medal summary ==
=== Men's Events ===
Year	Gold	Silver	Bronze
Time Trial	Shaun Wallace	Mark Barry	Gary Sadler
Amateur Sprint	Mark Barry	Paul Sydenham	Eddie Alexander or Paul Swinnerton
Professional Sprint	Terry Tinsley	Dave Le Grys	Andy Hayes
Prof Individual Pursuit	Sean Yates	Tony Doyle	Ian Banbury
Amateur Individual Pursuit	Shaun Wallace	Paul Curran	Darryl Webster
Team pursuit	Manchester Wheelers	Velo Club Nottingham	GS Strada
Amateur 50 km Points	Glen Mitchell	Paul Curran	Kevin Byers
Amateur 20 km Scratch	Shaun Wallace	Glen Mitchell	Gary Sadler
Madison	Paul Curran & Hugh Cameron	Glen Mitchell & Gerry Taylor	
Professional Omnium	Terry Tinsley	Mick Bennett	Phil Thomas
Professional Keirin	Terry Tinsley		
Tandem	Paul Swinnerton & Paul Sydenham	David Marsh & Richard Grace	John Arkwright & Mark Minting
Derny	Andy Hurford	Steve Bent	Bob Barber

=== Women's Events ===
Year	Gold	Silver	Bronze
Time Trial	Catherine Swinnerton	Barbara Collins	Jayne Axon
Sprint	Sally Hodge	Jackie Harris	Catherine Swinnerton
Individual Pursuit	Barbara Collins	Mandy Jones	Catherine Swinnerton or Helen Parritt
