= 1977 British National Track Championships =

1977 cycling competitions in Leicester, England

- Venue: Leicester, England
- Date(s): 5–13 August 1977
- Velodrome: Leicester Velodrome

The 1977 British National Track Championships were a series of track cycling competitions held from 5–13 August 1977 at the Leicester Velodrome. The Championships were sponsored by Newmark and the championships suffered two cancelled days due to rain.

== Medal summary ==
=== Men's Events ===
Event	Gold	Silver	Bronze
Time Trial	Trevor Gadd	Paul Fennell	Andy Coady
Amateur Sprint	Trevor Gadd	John Tudor	Dave Le Grys
Professional Sprint	Mick Bennett	Trevor Bull	Steve Heffernan
Prof Individual Pursuit	Steve Heffernan	Robin Croker	Mick Bennett
Amateur Individual Pursuit	Tony Doyle	Derek Hunt	Ian Banbury
Team Pursuit	34 Nomads & C P Hart; Ron Keeble; Peter Hamilton; Glen Mitchell; Rik Evans	VC Europa; Terry Holmes; Alan Rice; Dave Patten; Nigel Redmile	Halesowen ACC
Amateur 50 km Points	Ray Crombie	Gary Cresswell	Glen Mitchell
Amateur 20 km Scratch	Ian Hallam	Glen Mitchell	Tony James
Madison	Tony Doyle & Glen Mitchell	Hugh Cameron & Gary Creswell	David Brotherton & Steve Mann
Tandem	Trevor Gadd & Steve Cronshaw	Dave Le Grys & John Tudor	Paul Gerrard & Andy Nickeas
Derny	Rik Notley & Howard Broughton	Alan Johnson & Alan Gibb	John Hall & Les Robinson

=== Women's Events ===
Event	Gold	Silver	Bronze
Sprint	Faith Murray	Catherine Swinnerton	Brenda Atkinson
Individual Pursuit	Maggie Thompson	Denise Burton	Beryl Burton
