= 1984 British National Track Championships =

- Venue: Leicester, England
- Date(s): 6–9 September 1984
- Velodrome: Leicester Velodrome

The 1984 British National Track Championships were a series of track cycling competitions held from 6–9 September 1984 at the Leicester Velodrome. The Championships were held later than usual because of the 1984 Summer Olympics and the 1984 UCI Track Cycling World Championships which both took place in August.

== Medal summary ==
=== Men's Events ===
Year	Gold	Silver	Bronze
Time Trial	Shaun Wallace	Mark Barry	Eddie Alexander
Amateur Sprint	Paul McHugh		
Professional Sprint	Terry Tinsley	Paul Swinnerton	Dave Le Grys
Prof Individual Pursuit	Ian Banbury	Ian Binder	Dave Miller
Amateur Individual Pursuit	Darryl Webster	Shaun Wallace	Paul Curran
Team pursuit	Manchester Wheelers	Velo Club Nottingham	London VC D'Or
Amateur 50 km Points	Paul Curran	Kevin Byers	Martin Webster
Amateur 20 km Scratch	Shaun Wallace	Steve Paulding	Gary Coltman
Madison	Paul Curran & Hugh Cameron	Gerry Taylor & Terry Taylor	Kevin Byers & Dennis Lightfoot
Professional Omnium	Glen Mitchell	Paul Swinnerton	Terry Tinsley
Professional Keirin	Terry Tinsley	Dave Le Grys	Paul Swinnerton
Tandem	Michael Borman & Chris Pyatt	David Marsh & Richard Grace	David Mayes & Peter Green
Derny	Ian Donohue & Howard Broughton	Nick Lett & Paul Wingrave	Adrian Adgar &

=== Women's Events ===
Year	Gold	Silver	Bronze
Time Trial	Barbara Tate	Sally Hodge	Alison Pockett
Sprint	Alison Pockett	Sally Hodge	
Individual Pursuit	Barbara Collins	Maria Blower	Catherine Swinnerton
