= 1978 British National Track Championships =

- Venue: Leicester, England
- Date(s): 24–29 July 1978
- Velodrome: Leicester Velodrome

The 1978 British National Track Championships were a series of track cycling competitions held from 24–29 July 1978, at the Leicester Velodrome.

It was billed as the centenary championships based on the first ever winner Ian Falconer who won the 1878 two miles national championship. A new hardwood track costing £175,000 was laid down just one week before competition began.

== Medal summary ==
=== Men's Events ===
| Event | Gold | Silver | Bronze |
|---|---|---|---|
| Time Trial | Trevor Gadd | Steve Cronshaw | Paul Fennell |
| Amateur Sprint | Trevor Gadd | Dave Le Grys | Steve Cronshaw |
| Professional Sprint | Ian Hallam | Paul Medhurst | Mick Bennett |
| Prof Individual Pursuit | Steve Heffernan | Ian Banbury | Ian Hallam |
| Amateur Individual Pursuit | Tony Doyle | John Patston | Willi Moore |
| Team Pursuit | Teesside Clarion | VC Europa Red | VC Europa Blue |
| Amateur 50 km Points | Steve Mann | Mick Davies | Tony James |
| Amateur 20 km Scratch | Glen Mitchell | Tony Doyle | Derek Hunt |
| Madison | Hugh Cameron & Gary Creswell | Gerry Taylor & Derek Hunt | Shaun Fenwick & Paul Robilliard |
| Tandem | Trevor Gadd & Steve Cronshaw | Paul Swinnerton & Peter Humphries | Jim Langmead & Brian Fudge |
| Derny | Alan Johnson | Rik Notley | Paul Gerrard |

=== Women's Events ===
| Event | Gold | Silver | Bronze |
|---|---|---|---|
| Sprint | Brenda Atkinson | Catherine Swinnerton | Lynda Allen |
| Individual Pursuit | Maggie Thompson | Brenda Atkinson | Denise Burton |
