= 1985 British National Track Championships =

1985 cycling competition

- Venue: Leicester, England
- Date(s): 1–10 August 1985
- Velodrome: Leicester Velodrome

The 1985 British National Track Championships were a series of track cycling competitions held from 1–10 August 1985 at the Leicester Velodrome. The Championships were hindered by heavy rain which delayed many events. The national sprint team coach and former rider Eddie Soens died after suffering a heart attack during the Championships.

== Medal summary ==
=== Men's Events ===
Year	Gold	Silver	Bronze
Amateur Time Trial	Eddie Alexander		
Amateur Sprint	Paul McHugh	Eddie Alexander	Mark Barry
Professional Sprint	Terry Tinsley	Dave Le Grys	Kevin Lloyd
Prof Individual Pursuit	Malcolm Elliott	Ian Banbury	Nigel Dean
Amateur Individual Pursuit	Darryl Webster	Adrian Timmis	Rob Muzio
Team pursuit	Manchester Wheelers	Dinnington RC	Paragon RT
Amateur 50 km Points	Paul Curran	Kevin Byers	Phil Wilkins
Madison	Greg Newton & Guy Rowland	Jon Walshaw & Martin Perrett	Nick Barnes & Russell Williams
Professional Omnium	Tony James	Nigel Dean	Ian Banbury
Professional Keirin	Terry Tinsley		
Tandem	Michael Borman & Chris Pyatt	Karl McHugh & Paul McHugh	Eddie Alexander & Steve Paulding
Derny	Nick Lett & Paul Wingrave	George Dixon & Jack Collins	Adrian Adgar &

=== Women's Events ===
Year	Gold	Silver	Bronze
Kilo	Sally Hodge	Barbara Tate	Alison Pockett
Sprint	Sally Hodge	Alison Pockett	Jackie Harris
Individual Pursuit	Theresa Dark	Maria Blower	Judith Painter
15km Points	Theresa Dark	Jackie Harris	Caroline Schouten
