= 2000 British National Track Championships =

Series of track cycling competitions held from 21 to 29 July 2000

- Venue: Manchester, England
- Date: 21–29 July 2000
- Velodrome: Manchester Velodrome

The 2000 British National Track Championships were a series of track cycling competitions held from 21 to 29 July 2000 at the Manchester Velodrome. The Championships were organised by the British Cycling Federation.

== Medal summary ==
=== Men's Events ===
| Event | Gold | Silver | Bronze |
|---|---|---|---|
| 1 km Time Trial | Jason Queally | Craig MacLean | Neil Campbell |
| Sprint | Craig MacLean | Chris Hoy | Andy Slater |
| Keirin | Craig MacLean | Barney Storey | Alwyn McMath |
| Team sprint | Chris Hoy; Craig MacLean; James Taylor | Andy Slater; Neil Campbell; David Heald | Ross Edgar; David Heaven; Dave Le Grys |
| Individual Pursuit | Rob Hayles | Paul Manning | Bradley Wiggins |
| Team pursuit | Benedict Elliott; Chris Birch; Andrew Russell; Neil Campbell | Jason Benham; Robert Darley; Gary Lang; Chris Richardson | Jonathon Nunan; Alex Crichter; Dave Ebbrell; David Lowe |
| Points | Tony Gibb | Kieran Page | Ross Muir |
| Scratch | Benedict Elliott | Alwyn McMath | Tony Gibb |
| Madison | Tony Gibb; James Taylor | James Notley; Rob Wodd | Rod Ellingworth; Jon Nunan |

=== Women's Events ===
| Event | Gold | Silver | Bronze |
|---|---|---|---|
| 500m time trial | Julie Forrester | Denise Hampson | Wendy Everson |
| Sprint | Wendy Everson | Denise Hampson | Victoria Pendleton |
| Individual Pursuit | Yvonne McGregor | Emma Davies | Frances Newstead |
| Points | Frances Newstead | Angela Hunter | Sally Boyden |
| Scratch | Julie Forrester | Sally Boyden | Charlotte Hopkinson |
