= 2003 British National Track Championships =

- Venue: Manchester, England
- Date(s): 17–23 August 2003
- Velodrome: Manchester Velodrome

The 2003 British National Track Championships were a series of track cycling competitions held from 17–23 August 2003 at the Manchester Velodrome.

== Medal summary ==
=== Men's Events ===
Event	Gold	Silver	Bronze
1 Km Time Trial	Craig MacLean	Jason Queally	Chris Hoy
Sprint	Ross Edgar	Jamie Staff	Barney Storey
Keirin	Barney Storey	Matthew Haynes	Dave Heald
Team sprint	Chris Hoy; Craig MacLean; Jason Queally	Ross Edgar; David Le Grys; Robin Thompson	Matthew Haynes; Marco Librizzi; James Taylor
Individual Pursuit	Paul Manning	Bryan Steel	Rob Hayles
Team pursuit	Paul Manning; James Notley; Andrew Russell; Phil West	Dominic Hill; John Scripps; Bryan Taylor; Tom White	Bruce Edgar; Ben Hallam; Stuart Shawcross; Mark Cavendish
Points	Russell Downing	Ben Hallam	Dominic Hill
Scratch	Chris Newton	Russell Downing	Mark Kelly

=== Women's Events ===
Event	Gold	Silver	Bronze
500m time trial	Victoria Pendleton	Denise Hampson	Kate Cullen
Sprint	Victoria Pendleton	Denise Hampson	Kate Cullen
Keirin	Victoria Pendleton	Denise Hampson	Wendy Everson
Individual Pursuit	Emma Davies	Frances Newstead	Rachel Heal
Points	Emma Davies	Rachel Heal	Victoria Pendleton
Scratch	Victoria Pendleton	Kate Cullen	Emma Davies
