= 2001 British National Track Championships =

- Venue: Manchester, England
- Date(s): 5–11 August 2001
- Velodrome: Manchester Velodrome

The 2001 British National Track Championships were a series of track cycling competitions held from 5–11 August 2001 at the Manchester Velodrome. The Championships were organised by the British Cycling Federation.

== Medal summary ==
=== Men's Events ===
Event	Gold	Silver	Bronze
1 Km Time Trial	Craig MacLean	Andy Slater	Jonathan Norfolk
Sprint	Craig MacLean	Andy Slater	Alwyn McMath
Keirin	Jonathan Norfolk	Barney Storey	Alwyn McMath
Team sprint	Chris Hoy; James Taylor; Jason Queally	David Heald; Anton Quist; Barney Storey	Ross Edgar; Robin Thompson; Christian Lyte
Individual Pursuit	Paul Manning	Rob Hayles	Chris Newton
Team pursuit	Tim Buckle; Steve Cummings; Rod Ellingworth; Phil West	Benedict Elliott; Paul Manning; James Notley; Andrew Russell	Richard Chapman; David Lowe; James McCallum; Ross Muir
Points	Rob Hayles	James Taylor	Tony Gibb
Scratch	= Tony Gibb = James Taylor		James Notley
Madison	Tony Gibb; James Taylor	Rod Ellingworth; Phil West	James Notley; Rob Wodd

=== Women's Events ===
Event	Gold	Silver	Bronze
500m time trial	Julie Forrester	Victoria Pendleton	Denise Hampson
Sprint	Denise Hampson	Victoria Pendleton	Emily Forde
Individual Pursuit	Emma Davies	Yvonne McGregor	Sara Symington
Points	Angela Hunter	Rachel Heal	Victoria Pendleton
Scratch	Angela Hunter	Victoria Pendleton	Charlotte Hopkinson
