= David Handley =

David Handley may refer to:

- David Handley (cyclist)
- David Handley (farmer)
