= Malcolm Hill (cyclist) =

Australian cyclist (born 1954)

Personal information
- Born: 4 August 1954 (age 72) Australia

Cycling career
- Sport: Cycling

Amateur team
- 1973-78: Archer Road Club

Professional team
- 1978-83: Individual

Malcolm Hill (born 4 August 1954) is an Australian former cyclist.

== Cycling career ==
Despite being an Australian, he became the British track champion, winning the British National Individual Sprint Championships in 1974. He also became an Australian national champion after winning the 1 mile championships in 1978, at the Australian National Track Championships.
