= Lloyd Binch =

British cyclist

Personal information
- Born: 28 March 1931 Kimberley, Nottinghamshire, England
- Died: 15 December 2016 (aged 85) Nottinghamshire, England

Cycling career
- Sport: Cycling

Amateur team
- Notts Castle BC
Medal record
Cycling
Representing England
British Empire & Commonwealth Games
Bronze medal – third place	1958 Cardiff	1,000m match sprint

Lloyd Binch (28 March 1931 – 15 December 2016) was a British cyclist.

== Biography ==
He competed in the sprint event at the 1960 Summer Olympics.

He also represented the England team and won a bronze medal in the 1,000m match sprint at the 1958 British Empire and Commonwealth Games in Cardiff, Wales.

Binch was a seven times British track champion, winning the British National Individual Sprint Championships from 1955 until 1961.From 1956 until 1958 he won the International Champion of Champions sprint at Herne Hill velodrome.
