= Dennis Horn =

English track cyclist

Personal information
- Born: 5 July 1909 Upwell, Norfolk, England
- Died: 23 April 1974 (aged 64)

Cycling career
- Sport: Cycling
- Discipline: Track cycling
- Role: Rider

Dennis Sutton Horn (1909 – 1974) was an English male track cyclist.

== Cycling career ==
In the early 1920s Dennis and his older brother Cyril took up cycling, Cyril had represented Great Britain at two Olympic Games as a speed skater. Dennis became British champion when winning the British National Tandem Sprint Championships with John Sibbit in 1932. He later won an individual title, winning the Sprint Championship at the 1938 British National Track Championships.

Dennis featured in a cigarette card published by Senior Service cigarettes (J. A. Pattreiouex Ltd) in 1935. It was no. 25 of a set of 96 entitled Sporting Events and Stars.They raced for Norwich ABC (Amateur Bicycle Club).
