= Jayne Westbury =

Personal information
- Born: 1957 (age 68–69) England

Cycling career
- Sport: Cycling
- Current team: Chequers RC
- Disciplines: Track and Road cycling
- Role: Rider

Jayne Westbury (born 1957) is an English female former track and road cyclist.

== Cycling career ==
Westbury became a British road race champion, winning the road race title in 1975. She was also a three time runner-up to Faith Murray in the British National Individual Sprint Championships at the British National Track Championships in 1972, 1973 and 1974.
