= Charles Helps =

English cyclist (died 1991)

Personal information
- Born: 17 February 1910 Shepperton, Surrey, England
- Died: February 1991 (aged 81) Surrey, England

Cycling career
- Sport: Cycling
- Discipline: Track cycling
- Role: Rider

Amateur teams
- 1930: Nuneaton C.C.
- 1931–32: Curfew Wheelers
- 1933: Charlotteville C.C.
- 1934–38: Polytechnic C.C.

Charles Bertie Helps (1910–1991) was an English male track cyclist.

== Cycling career ==
Helps became British champion when winning the British National Individual Sprint Championships in 1936. He turned professional in 1939.
