= Luc Jones =

Welsh cyclist (born 1991)

Personal information
- Full name: Luc Jones
- Born: 21 November 1991 (age 34)

Cycling career
- Sport: Cycling
- Discipline: Track
- Role: Rider
- Rider type: Sprinter

Amateur teams
- 2000–: New Tredegar Nomads CC
- 2005: Team TrackCycling.co.uk

Major wins
- (United Kingdom) Multiple British Youth & Junior Champion

Luc Jones (born 21 November 1991) is a Welsh track racing cyclist.

He began cycling with the New Tredegar Nomads club at the age of eight, riding with his father Ian, himself a former Welsh champion sprinter. He was one of the Team TrackCycling.co.uk members in 2005, who were part funded by the launch of a coffee brand by Magnus Bäckstedt.

In 2007, Jones was the Youth British National Champion in both the sprint and 500 m time trial events. He became the first ever winner of the prestigious White Hope Sprint at Herne Hill Velodrome's Good Friday meeting to hold an under 16 championship title at the same time. He also went on to win the Ron Beckett scratch race the same day. He was described as having "prodigious sprinting talent" by Gerry McManus, a Cycling News reporter. Jones stepped up a category to compete against the Juniors in 2008, and succeeded in adding the Junior sprint champion title to his list.

Many were surprised in Autumn 2007 when Jones was controversially left off the team roster for British Cycling's Olympic Development Programme. Currently number one in Wales for his age group, Jones has since been included in the development squad for the 2012 Summer Olympics.

Jones competed at the European Track Championships in Poland in September 2008, where he won a silver medal as part of the junior team sprint squad.

== Palmarès ==
2007
1st (United Kingdom) Sprint, British National Track Championships - Youth
1st (United Kingdom) 500 m time trial. British National Track Championships - Youth
1st White Hope Sprint, Herne Hill
1st on Beckett scratch race, Herne Hill

2008
1st (United Kingdom) Sprint, British National Track Championships - Junior
2nd Team sprint, European Track Championships - Junior
