= Alan Bannister (cyclist) =

English cyclist (1922–2007)

Personal information
- Born: 3 November 1922 Manchester, England
- Died: 18 May 2007 (aged 84)

Cycling career
- Sport: Cycling

Amateur team
- Manchester Wheelers
Medal record
Men's cycling
Representing Great Britain
Olympic Games
Silver medal – second place	1948 London	Men's tandem

Alan Bannister MBE (3 November 1922 – 18 May 2007) was an English cyclist.

== Cycling career ==
He was born in Manchester and won a silver medal, representing Great Britain, in the tandem event at the 1948 Summer Olympics in London, together with Reg Harris. He also competed in the same event at the 1952 Summer Olympics.

Bannister was a three times British track champion, winning the British National Individual Sprint Championships in 1948, 1949 and 1950.

== Personal life ==
He was awarded an MBE. He had two sons Mark and Paul.
