= Wendy Everson =

English track racing cyclist (born 1965)

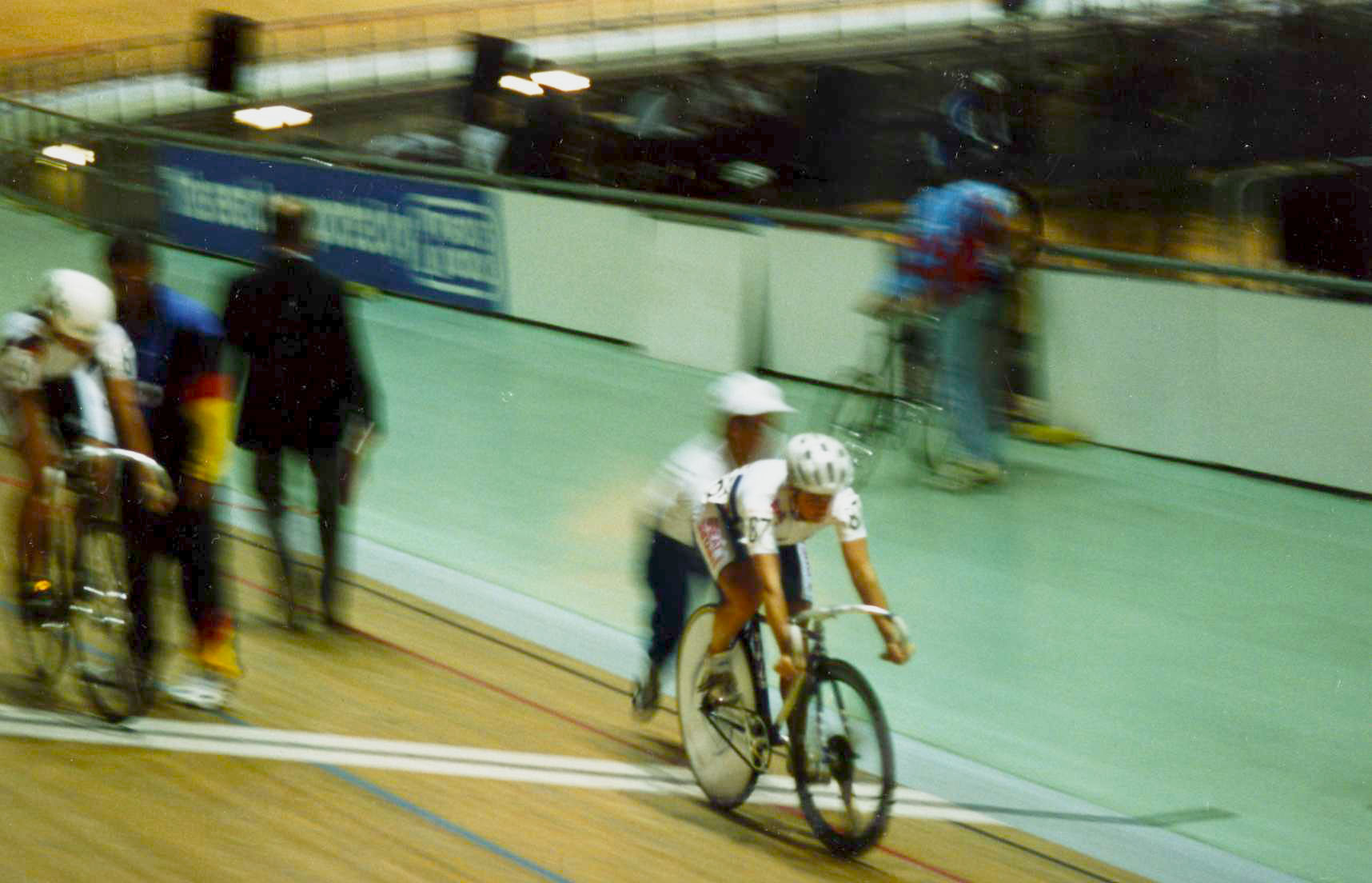

Personal information
- Born: 7 April 1965 (age 61) England, United Kingdom

Cycling career
- Sport: Cycling
- Discipline: Track
- Role: Rider
- Rider type: Sprinter (short distance specialist)

Wendy Everson (born 1965), is an English track racing cyclist who specializes in sprinting.

== Biography ==
Representing England, Everson finished fourth in the sprint at the 1994 Commonwealth Games. She competed in the UCI Track Cycling World Championships in Bogotá, Colombia in 1995, achieving 9th place in the 500m time trial with a National record of 36.2secs, 1996 Manchester England, and in 1997 Perth, finishing 14th in the 500 metre time trial event. She was beaten by Félicia Ballanger in the first round of the sprint event before being beaten by Rita Razmaite in the repechage. At the national championships in 1997, Everson won the scratch race and sprint events. She successfully defended her sprint title in 1998. Everson finished third in the national Keirin championships the first time it was held for women in 2003.

In total Everson won 14 British National Track Championships, winning eight British National Individual Sprint Championships, four British National Individual Time Trial Championships and two Scratch titles.

Everson held the British women's flying start 500 metre record in a time of 31.116 seconds until it was broken by Victoria Pendleton in 2002. She also held the 200m flying start record with a time of 11.651 seconds, which she set in Bogotá in 1995. This was broken by Denise Hampson in Moscow at the UCI Track Cycling World Cup, when she recorded a time of 11.508 seconds in the qualifying time trials. She also holds the 200 metre flying start world Masters record for the women's 30-39 age category, which she set in 2000, with a time of 12.415 seconds, and the 750 metre team sprint world Masters record of 54.031 seconds along with Suzie Tignor & Annette Hanson of the United States.

Everson brought an employment tribunal against British Cycling in 2001, disputing their decision not to support her financially. She lost the case on the basis that she was a competitor rather than a member of British Cycling staff.

Everson previously lived in Bridgend in the Vale of Glamorgan

== Palmarès ==
1992
1st (United Kingdom) Sprint, British National Track Championships

1994
1st (United Kingdom) Sprint, British National Track Championships

1995
1st (United Kingdom) 500 m time trial, British National Track Championships
1st (United Kingdom) Sprint, British National Track Championships
1st (United Kingdom) Scratch, British National Track Championships

1996
1st (United Kingdom) 500 m time trial, British National Track Championships
1st (United Kingdom) Sprint, British National Track Championships

1997
1st (United Kingdom) 500 m time trial, British National Track Championships
1st (United Kingdom) Sprint, British National Track Championships

1998
1st (United Kingdom) 500 m time trial, British National Track Championships
1st (United Kingdom) Sprint, British National Track Championships

1999
1st (United Kingdom) Sprint, British National Track Championships
1st (United Kingdom) Scratch, British National Track Championships
2nd 500 m time trial, British National Track Championships

2000
1st Sprint, UCI World Masters Track Championships, 30-39
1st 500 m time trial, UCI World Masters Track Championships, 30-39
1st Sprint, European Masters Track Championships, 30-39
1st 500 m time trial, European Masters Track Championships, 30-39
1st (United Kingdom) Sprint, British National Track Championships
2nd Points race, UCI World Masters Track Championships, 30-39
3rd 500 m time trial, British National Track Championships

2001
1st Points race, UCI World Masters Track Championships, 30-39
2nd Sprint, UCI World Masters Track Championships, 30-39

2003
3rd Keirin, British National Track Championships
