= John Sibbit =

British track cyclist

Personal information
- Full name: John Ephraim Sibbit
- Nickname: Jack
- Born: 4 March 1895 Ancoats, Manchester
- Died: 5 August 1950 (aged 55)

Cycling career
- Sport: Cycling

Amateur team
- 1919-1938: Manchester Wheelers' Club
Medal record
Representing United Kingdom
Olympic Games
Silver medal – second place	1928 Amsterdam	Tandem

John Ephraim Sibbit (Jack Sibbit) (4 March 1895 – 5 August 1950) was a British track cyclist who won a silver medal at the 1928 Summer Olympics.

By age 41 he had held twelve national titles including tandem sprints, with Dennis Horn. Sibbit built, rode and sold his own 'Jack E Sibbit' bicycles from premises at 475 Stockport Road, Manchester.

== Personal life ==
Sibbit was the son of a butcher from Ancoats in Manchester.

== Career ==
=== Competition ===
Sibbit began racing in 1919 when he joined the Manchester Wheelers' Club. He won his first national championship in 1922, the 5-mile track. In 1925 and 1927 he was quarter-mile champion and in 1929 he was 25-mile champion. The 1,000-yard sprint championship was introduced in 1930, and Sibbit won in 1931 and 1932.

He won the tandem championship eight times - in 1924, 1928, 1929, 1930, 1931, 1932, 1936 and 1937. Sibbit rode on the front of the tandem; Ernest Chambers was his stoker for five of the national championship victories. His other national partners were A. White (Rover CC) in 1924, Ernest Higgins (Manchester Wheelers) in 1931 and Dennis Horn (Norwich ABC) in 1932.

Sibbit held three British tandem track records with Chambers. The two won the Olympic tandem event in 1928. Sibbit rode in the 1936 Berlin Olympics. By age 41 he had held twelve national titles including tandem sprints, with Horn.

From 1922, Sibbit represented Britain in world championships in England, Denmark, Belgium, Italy, Switzerland and Germany. He retired from racing in 1938 to become an official. He was British team manager at the 1948 and 1949 world championships, in the Netherlands and Denmark.

=== Sibbit bicycles ===
Later in his career he rode bicycles that bore his own name. Sibbit bicycles were ridden by people such as Reg Harris. The badge stated 'Jack E Sibbit 475 Stockport Rd Manchester'. Sibbit worked for Ford during the Second World War and resumed making hand-made cycles from 1946 until his death in November 1950 at age 55.

== Commemoration ==
=== The Golden Book ===
Sibbit's achievements were celebrated in 1932 with a page in the Golden Book of Cycling.
