= Alison Pockett =

Personal information
- Born: 1966 Sutton Coldfield, Birmingham, England

Cycling career
- Sport: Cycling
- Discipline: Track cycling
- Role: Rider

Alison Pockett (born 1966) is an English female former track cyclist.

== Cycling career ==
Pockett became a British track champion after winning the British National Individual Sprint Championships in 1984.
