= Pete Mugglestone =

English cyclist

Personal information
- Nationality: British (English)
- Born: Q2. 1945 Leicester, England

Sport
- Club: Bradgate RC; Leicester Forest CC

Peter R. Mugglestone (born 1945) is a former British international cyclist who competed at the Commonwealth Games.

== Biography ==
Born in Leicester during 1945, Mugglestone rode for the Bradgate Road Club of Leicester and studied turbo-machinery at the University of Cambridge.

In 1968, he joined Leicester Forest Cycling Club, where he teamed up with Tony Brockhurst in the tandem, winning the 1969 tandem title with Brockhurst at the British National Tandem Sprint Championships. In 1970, he won the Memorial Trophy (with Brockhurst) for the best service to the club, in addition to breaking club and county records over varying distances. Later that year the pair won a second British National Tandem Sprint Championships.

Mugglestone represented the England team at the 1970 British Commonwealth Games in Edinburgh, Scotland, where he participated in the tandem event. During the tandem event, the pair crashed and suffered injuries, with Mugglestone breaking a collar-bone and suffering concussion.
