= Ann Davey =

English cyclist

Personal information
- Born: 8 October 1963 Dover, Kent, England

Cycling career
- Sport: Cycling
- Discipline: Track cycling
- Role: Rider

Ann Davey (born 1963) is an English female former track and road cyclist.

== Cycling career ==
Davey became a British track champion after winning the British National Individual Sprint Championships in 1981.
