= Alan Williams (cyclist) =

English cyclist

Personal information
- Born: 11 May 1948

Cycling career
- Sport: Cycling
- Discipline: Track cycling
- Role: Rider

Professional teams
- 1975–77: Falcon
- 1977: Midlet BSA
- 1978: Barnett Edwards Shimano

Alan Williams (born 1948) is an English male former track cyclist.

== Cycling career ==
Williams became British champion when winning the British National Individual Sprint Championships in 1976.
