= Gary Hibbert =

Personal information
- Nationality: English
- Born: 1963

Sport
- Sport: Cycling

Gary Hibbert (born 1963), is a male former cyclist who competed for England.

== Athletics career ==
Hibbert was the 1994 National Champion after winning the British National Track Championships sprint title. He represented England in the 1,000 metres sprint event, at the 1994 Commonwealth Games in Victoria, British Columbia, Canada.
