= Dave Akam =

Road bicycle racer

Personal information
- Nationality: United Kingdom
- Born: 2 November 1960; Camberwell, London

Sport
- Sport: Cycling

David J. Akam (born 2 November 1960, Camberwell, London) is a retired track and road cyclist who specialized in time-trials. He was active professionally between 1984 and 1987.

== Early life ==
David Akam was a track and road cyclist. He was introduced to cycling by his P.E. teacher at Forest Hill school, South London – the British lanterne rouge John Clarey. Akam's early successes in cycling included three British National Track Championships and the Junior Individual Time Trial Road Championship. In 1978 Akam was selected for the English track team in the Commonwealth Games in Edmonton, Alberta, Canada, competing in the 4,000 metres Individual Pursuit. Having trained for months with the 1980 Olympic pursuit team squad, Akam fractured his hip in a kermesse crash, putting him out of contention. However, that July the 19-year-old Akam broke the British 10-mile time trial record becoming the first ever rider to clock in at under 20 minutes (the record has since been held by Graeme Obree, Bradley Wiggins and Alex Dowsett). The same year he also won the Goodwood Classic individual time trial in a time of 1 hour 2 minutes and 39 seconds – a time that has never been beaten.

Over the next three years, from 1981 to 1983, Akam lived and raced abroad, first in the Netherlands for the Jan Van Erp team, and then France. In his second year, Akam won 13 races including the Grand Prix de France.

In 1983, Akam moved his racing base to France, joining the ACBB team, a Parisian amateur team which had helped the likes of Sean Yates and Stephen Roche to the professional ranks. During that year's Tour of Norway, Akam caught the eye of Mercier and Peugeot's Francesco Moser. Akam then won the Chrono des Nations.

== Professional career ==
In 1984 he was signed by the Italian team Gis Gelati to help the Italian Moser to win his first Giro d'Italia. Akam was nicknamed "Rosso" on account of his red hair. While in Italy, Akam lived with Moser's mother. Shortly after joining Gis Gelati Akam rode for Moser in the Vuelta a España, in which Moser finished 10th overall and Akam pulled out after Stage 11. The team prepared for the 1984 Giro by winning the Team Time Trial event, the Cronostaffetta, and by racing the Tirreno–Adriatico in which Akam came 5th in the prologue time trial. Akam also competed at the Giro del Trentino to cement his place on the Giro team. At the Giro, Akam played a role in delivering Moser to first place in Verona and the first and only pink jersey of Moser's career at the Giro d'Italia. Akam often rode the Giro on the front for Moser. Until Chris Froome's victory in 34 years later, Akam was the last Briton to ride on a Giro winner's team.

In 1985 Akam was given an extension to his contract and began his preparations for the Giro well by competing at the Tirreno–Adriatico. He again rode the Giro but this time he withdrew after Stage 9 due to a crash. Akam also rode alongside the classics specialist Roger De Vlaeminck whilst at Gis Gelati.

Akam joined the Dutch team PDM–Concorde in 1986 to ride for Pedro Delgado. Akam was offered another extension but in 1987 Akam opted to join the British outfit ANC-Halfords Cycling Team.

Akam retired from cycling shortly afterwards, his career cut short by illness. Akam had raced the Giro, the Vuelta, Paris–Roubaix and Milan–San Remo. Throughout his career, Akam suffered from a mystery illness. Akam on reflection states that his dream move in 1984 to Gis Gelati came too soon because he had no time to deal with his health problems – later diagnosed as hepatitis and a liver that functioned at only 70%.

== Palmarès ==
1977
1st National Championship, Track, Pursuit, Juniors
1st National Time Trial Championship, Juniors
1978
2nd National Time Trial Championship, Juniors
1979
3rd National Championship, Track, Pursuit, Amateurs
6th National Time Trial Championship Amateurs
1980
1st National Championship, Track, Madison, Amateurs
1st Goodwood Classic
2nd National Championship, Track, Pursuit, Amateurs
2nd Trofeo Valco Couple Time Trial
3rd National Championship, Track, Team Pursuit, Elite
4th Trofeo Baracchi
1981
1st National Championship, Track, Pursuit, Amateurs
1st Trofeo Valco Couple Time Trial
1st Fayt-le-Franc Criterium
2nd Trofeo Baracchi
2nd Neerlinter Criterium
2nd Itterbeek Criterium
3rd Prologue Olympia's Tour
1982
1st Grand Prix de France ITT
1st Trofee Jan Van Erp
1st Grand Prix Timmermans
1st Grand Prix der Witten
9th Overall Sealink Race

1st Prologue & 4th Stage 4

2nd Drielanden Omloop
6th National Road Race Championship Amateurs
Circuit des Ardennes

4th Prologue & 5th Stage 3

55th Overall Étoile des Espoirs

6th Prologue & 6th Stage 5b ITT

1983
1st Chrono des Nations
1st Overall Tour de l'Essonne

1st Stage 3

1st Prix Novoplastic
2nd Grand Prix des Nations (Amateurs)
2nd Grand Prix d'Issoire
2nd Chrono Madelinos
2nd Grand Prix de Boulogne-Billancourt
3rd Stage 2a Tour de l'Eurométropole
14th Overall Milk Race
1984
1st Cronostaffetta TTT with Francesco Moser and Roger De Vlaeminck
5th Prologue Tirreno–Adriatico
137th Overall 1984 Giro d'Italia

3rd TTT Stage 1 & 14th ITT Stage 22

7th Trofeo Baracchi
Vuelta a España

9th Stage 2

1985
Tirreno–Adriatico

6th Prologue, 2nd stage 2 TTT & 8th Stage 5 ITT

1985 Giro d'Italia

2nd stage 2 TTT

1986
6th ITT Tour of Valenciana
7th Trofeo Baracchi
1987
28th Overall Milk Race

3rd Stage 11

81st Overall 4 Jours de Dunkerque
