= Rod Ellingworth =

English cyclist and cycling coach

Personal information
- Full name: Rodney Francis Ellingworth
- Born: 21 August 1972 (age 54) Burnley, Lancashire, England
- Height: 180 cm (5 ft 11 in)

Cycling career
- Sport: Cycling
- Current team: Netcompany–Ineos
- Disciplines: Road; Track
- Role: Rider (retired); Directeur sportif; General manager

Amateur teams
- ?: Witham Wheelers
- Early 1990s: Cherry Valley RT
- 1995/1996: Delta Racing Team/Dyna-Tech

Professional teams
- 1995: Ambrosia/Dyna-Tech
- 1996: Ambrosia
- 1997: UV Aube (France)

Managerial teams
- 2008: 100% Me
- 2010–2019: Team Sky
- 2020: Bahrain–McLaren
- 2021–: INEOS Grenadiers

Rodney Francis Ellingworth (born 11 August 1972) is a British former professional cyclist, who currently works as the director of performance at UCI WorldTeam Bahrain Victorious. Previously, he worked as a coach for the Team Sky professional cycling team, and from January 2013 their performance manager, responsible for overseeing the sports directors and race coaches. He was also the general manager of Bahrain–McLaren in 2020.

== Career ==
Born in Burnley, Lancashire, Ellingworth competed as a professional cyclist between 1995 and 1997 and represented his country several times at international events.

He was the coach for British Cycling's U23 Academy '100% ME' team based in Tuscany, Italy. At the end of 2008 he was promoted to the role of senior endurance coach, with the aim to creating a team and a rider strong enough to win the men's world road race championships.

Mark Cavendish is one of the riders who has been influenced by Ellingworth with Cavendish stating in several interviews that he had learnt a lot from Ellingworth, and not only about cycling. Ellingworth has also led the National team to several stage victories in the Tour of Britain in 2007.

== Major results ==
1995
2nd Tom Simpson Memorial Race
9th Girvan 3 day 'Premier Calendar' race

1st Stage 2

1996
1st Points classification Girvan 3 day 'Premier Calendar'
2000
1st Overall Tour of the Kingdom

1st Stage 1

2nd Overall East Riding of Yorkshire Classic (2 day) 'Premier Calendar' race
3rd Overall Girvan 3 day 'Premier Calendar' race

== Bibliography ==
- Ellingworth, Rod (2013). Project Rainbow: How British Cycling Reached the Top of the World. London: Faber & Faber. ISBN 978-0-571-30349-6.
