= Donald McKellow =

British cyclist (1925–2022)

Personal information
- Full name: Donald McKellow
- Born: 7 May 1925 London, England
- Died: 4 May 2022 (aged 96) Hillingdon, London

Cycling career
- Sport: Cycling

Amateur team
- Actonia CC

Donald McKellow (7 May 1925 – 4 May 2022) was a British cyclist. He competed in the 1,000 metres time trial event at the 1952 Summer Olympics.

As of 2017, McKellow resided in Hillingdon, London with his wife Beryl. They ran dance classes together and were known as Mr and Mrs Melody.
