= David Handley (cyclist) =

British cyclist

Personal information
- Born: 3 February 1932 Birmingham, England
- Died: 9 March 2013 (aged 81)

Cycling career
- Sport: Cycling
- Rider type: sprinter

David Handley (3 February 1932 – 9 March 2013) was a British cyclist. He competed in the tandem event at the 1960 Summer Olympics.
