= Paul Medhurst (cyclist) =

British-New Zealand racing cyclist (1953–2009)

Personal information
- Born: 12 December 1953 Scunthorpe, England
- Died: 29 September 2009 (aged 55) Ghent, Belgium

Cycling career
- Sport: Cycling
Medal record
Men's track cycling
Representing New Zealand
British Commonwealth Games
Bronze medal – third place	1974 Christchurch	tandem sprint

Paul Medhurst (12 December 1953 – 26 September 2009), born in Scunthorpe, was a track cyclist with dual British-New Zealand nationality.

== Cycling career ==
He won the bronze medal in the men's tandem sprint at the 1974 British Commonwealth Games partnering Philip Harland representing New Zealand. He competed for Great Britain in the 1000m time trial event at the 1976 Summer Olympics.

Medhurst was a three times British track champion, winning the British National Individual Sprint Championships in 1975, a tandem title (1976) and a madison title (1975).

He died in Ghent, Belgium.
