= Julie Paulding =

English cyclist

Personal information
- Full name: Julie Anne Paulding nee Forrester
- Nickname: Jules
- Born: 4 May 1969 (age 57) England; United Kingdom

Cycling career
- Sport: Cycling
- Discipline: Track
- Role: Rider
- Rider type: Sprinter

Amateur team
- VC St Raphael

Major wins
- 500m TT, 2002 Commonwealth Games

Julie Anne Paulding née Forrester (born 4 May 1969, Prenton, Birkenhead) is an English competitive track cyclist who won silver in the 500m Time Trial at the 2002 Commonwealth Games in Manchester. She had taken up cycling four years previously having been forced to give up her previous sport due to injury.

Paulding is now a development officer for Scottish Cycling. She lives in Manchester and married Steve Paulding in October 2001.

== Palmarès ==
1999
1st 500m TT British National Track Championships

2000
1st 500m TT British National Track Championships
1st 15km scratch race, British National Track Championships

2001
1st 500m TT British National Track Championships

2002
2nd 500m TT 2002 Commonwealth Games
7th 500m TT UCI Track Cycling World Championships
