= Alwyn McMath =

Alwyn McMath is a track cyclist who raced for Great Britain and Northern Ireland between 1995 and 2002. Born in Newry, Co Down, in 1974, his first International Cap came at the age of 21, riding for GB in 1995 at the under-23 European Championships in Valencia. During those years his notable performances included National medals in Sprint, Keirin and 20 km, with International World Cup medals in Team Sprint and Keirin, including Gold in the team Sprint with Chris Hoy and Andy Slater in the World Cup in Sydney 2002. In 1996, whilst racing in Moscow at the European Championships, McMath set a new British Record for 200m of 10.658s.

Northern Irish cyclist who was on a winning "Team sprint" team at the 2002 UCI Track Cycling World Cup Classics and won bronze as an individual in Keirin.
