= Denise Hampson =

Welsh female former track cyclist

Personal information
- Born: June 1978 Clwyd, Wales

Cycling career
- Sport: Cycling
- Discipline: Track cycling
- Role: Rider

Denise Kay Hampson (born 1978) is a Welsh female former track cyclist. She is currently CEO of the behavioural design agency Desire Code.

== Cycling career ==
Hampson became a British track champion after winning the British National Individual Sprint Championships in 2001.

She competed for Team GB between 1999 and 2004, before retiring.
