= Paul McHugh (cyclist) =

English cyclist (born 1967)

Personal information
- Nationality: England
- Born: 12 July 1967 (age 58); Liverpool, England

Paul McHugh (born 12 July 1967, Darwen) is a former English track sprint cyclist, 14 times British track champion, and winner of 2 World Series. On retiring from the sport in 1995, McHugh began a career directing and producing Visual Effects. After serving 7 years as Animation Director in the games industry at Acclaim, Sony Psynosis and Rage Software, he launched his own VFX company, Carbon Digital.

== Sprint cyclist ==
From an early age, he competed at international level for his country, winning 14 British titles in just 10 years. He remains the only track cyclist to have won both the Junior and Senior National Sprint title in the same year, (1984), achieved at just 17 years of age. He rode for clubs including: Kirkby Cycling Club, Mersey Road Club and Manchester Wheelers, and began riding for the British team in 1984. Paul was talent spotted by Eddie Soens when he was just 15. Eddie Soens coached Paul throughout his career, seeing him win several British titles.

He represented Great Britain at the World Championships, Grand Prix of London (won 3 times: 1987, 1988, 1989), Grand Prix Leicester (1984, 1986) and won 14 National Championship titles from 1984 to 1994. Paul turned professional in 1989, riding for Pirelli. He represented England in the 1,000 metres match sprint, at the 1986 Commonwealth Games in Edinburgh, Scotland.

== Palmarès ==
(United Kingdom) British National Individual Sprint Championships
1984, 1985, 1986, 1990, 1991, 1992
(United Kingdom) British National Keirin Championships
1989, 1992, 1994

== Visual effects director ==
Paul has directed commercials, films and Visual effects including:

- Cirro TVC, Ten Motives (Live action / VFX)
- Little Big Planet 3, Sony Computer Entertainment (Live action / VFX)
- Babybel World Cup, RKCR/Y&R (Live action / VFX)
- Babybel Christmas, (Live action / VFX)
- The Car That Would Drive On The Ceiling, Formula 1, BBC Sport (Live action / VFX)
- Race Tactics, Formula 1, BBC Learning (Live action / VFX)
- Cost of a Crash with Eddie Jordan, (Live action / VFX)
- Sacred Wonders of Britain, BBC
- Moshi Monsters, Katsuma Unleashed, (Animation / VFX)
- The Specialists TVC, CSL (Live action / VFX)
- Audi A7, BBH (VFX)
- J20, BBH (VFX)
- SpinPalace TVC (Live action / VFX)
- Spin and Win TVC (Live action / VFX)
- St.Stephens TVC, Baber Smith (Live action / VFX)
- Unilever Domestos Germ World, for DKLW Lowe (Live action / VFX)
