= Reg Barnett =

British cyclist

Personal information
- Born: 15 October 1945 (age 81) Eltham, London, England
- Height: 173 cm (5 ft 8 in)
- Weight: 66 kg (146 lb)

Cycling career
- Sport: Cycling

Amateur team
- Old Kent CC; De Laune CC, London

Reginald Albert Barnett (born 15 October 1945) is a British retired cyclist who competed at the 1968 Summer Olympics.

== Biography ==
Barnett grew up in South London and began cycling as a teenager. He represented the England team in the 1,000 metres match sprint, at the 1966 British Empire and Commonwealth Games in Kingston, Jamaica.

At the 1968 Olympic Games in Mexico City, he competed in the sprint event.

He was the national sprint champion on six occasions in 1967, 1968, 1969, 1970, 1972 and 1973.

In 2026, he published a memoir, Thin Glass and Thin Ice, which covered his track racing career, his later switch to road racing, taking performance-enhancing drugs, periods of depression, heavy drinking and taking cocaine.
