= Des Fretwell =

British cyclist

Personal information
- Born: 13 July 1955 (age 71)

Cycling career
- Sport: Cycling

Amateur team
- Manchester Wheelers

Desmond Fretwell (born 13 July 1955) is a British former cyclist. He competed in the team time trial event at the 1980 Summer Olympics. He also represented England in the road race, at the 1978 Commonwealth Games in Edmonton, Alberta, Canada.
