= Dave Watkins (cyclist) =

English cyclist (born 1945)

Personal information
- Nickname: Doc
- Nationality: British (English)
- Born: 3 May 1945 Birmingham, England
- Died: 12 September 2021 (aged 76) Birmingham, England

Sport
- Sport: Cycling
- Event(s): Track: Scratch, Sprint
- Club: Castle Bromwich / Wyndham CC (amateur)

David "Dave" R Watkins (3 May 1945 – 12 September 2021), was a cyclist who competed for England at the Commonwealth Games.

== Biography ==
Watkins represented England at international level during the 1960s and won the gold medal in the junior sprint at the 1963 British National Road Race Championships. He finished on the podium at three further National Championships.

He was selected for the England team in the scratch race and match sprint event, at the 1966 British Empire and Commonwealth Games in Kingston, Jamaica.

He was a member of the Castle Bromwich and Wyndham Cycling Clubs before turning professional and joining the Harry Quinn Galli team and later the United States Grab on team.

He died in 2021 aged 76.
