= John Tudor (cyclist) =

Welsh cyclist (born 1953)

Personal information
- Born: 18 April 1953 Port Talbot, Wales

Cycling career
- Sport: Cycling
- Discipline: Track cycling
- Role: Rider

Amateur team
- 1976-77: Chequers Road

Professional team
- 1982: Boisage Argos

John Tudor (born 1953) is a Welsh male former track cyclist.

== Cycling career ==
Tudor became British champion when winning the British National Individual Sprint Championships in 1976.

He represented Wales at both the 1974 British Commonwealth Games and the 1978 Commonwealth Games.
