= Darryl Webster =

English cyclist (born 1962)

Darryl James Webster
Personal information
- Born: 7 May 1962 (age 64) Leicester, England

Cycling career
- Sport: Cycling
- Discipline: Road
- Role: Rider

Amateur team
- Manchester Wheelers' Club

Professional teams
- 1988: P.M.S. Dawes
- 1989: Teka

Major wins
- Nissan Classic, 1 stage
Medal record
Cycling
Representing England
Commonwealth Games
Bronze medal – third place	1982 Brisbane	team pursuit

Darryl James Webster (born 7 May 1962) is a former English professional cyclist from Walsall.

== Cycling career ==
He rode for Great Britain at the Olympic Games and won twenty three national championship titles. He also famously won a stage in the 1988 Nissan Classic from a 101-mile solo break. Webster has always claimed to be strongly against the use of drugs in sport, but in April 2013 he was caught growing cannabis worth £24,000.

He represented England and competed in the 4,000 metres individual pursuit and won a bronze medal in the 4,000 metres team pursuit, at the 1982 Commonwealth Games in Brisbane, Queensland, Australia.

== Palmarès ==
1978
1st GHS Schoolboy National TT 10 miles championship
1980
1st Overall National Junior Road Series
3rd Junior World Championships, Track, Team Pursuit
1981
(United Kingdom) 3rd British National Hill Climb Championships
1982
3rd Commonwealth Games, Track, Team Pursuit
1983
5th Tour of the Cotswolds
(United Kingdom) 1st British National Hill Climb Championships
1984
4th Overall, Sealink International
2nd Overall, Circuit des Mines
(United Kingdom) 1st British National Hill Climb Championships
DNF Olympic Games, Road race
8th Olympic Games, 100 kilometres Team Time Trial
1985
(United Kingdom) 1st British National Hill Climb Championships
(United Kingdom) 4th British National Road Race Championships (Amateur)
1st Lincoln GP
1986
(United Kingdom) 1st British National Hill Climb Championships
3rd Lincoln GP
1987
2nd Archer Grand Prix
1st Manx Trophy
2nd Lincoln GP
2nd Overall, Premier Calendar
1988
8th Overall, Tour of Britain
21st Grand Prix des Nations
1st Gwent
1st Windermere
(United Kingdom) 26th British National Road Race Championships (Professional)
31st Overall, Nissan Classic

1st Stage 3, Nissan Classic

1989
8th GP Wales
(United Kingdom) 29th British National Road Race Championships (Professional)
