= Mark Barry (cyclist) =

British cyclist

Personal information
- Born: 13 May 1964 (age 62) Leeds, England

Cycling career
- Sport: Cycling

Mark Barry (born 13 May 1964) is a British former cyclist.

== Cycling career ==
He competed in the sprint and 1000m time trial events at the 1984 Summer Olympics.

He represented England in the match sprint and time trial events, at the 1982 Commonwealth Games in Brisbane, Queensland, Australia.

Barry was twice British track champion, winning the British National Individual Sprint Championships in 1982 and 1983.
