= Shaun Wallace (cyclist) =

British cyclist

Personal information
- Born: 20 November 1961 (age 64) Christchurch, Hampshire, England (United Kingdom)

Cycling career
- Sport: Cycling
Medal record
Cycling
Representing England
Commonwealth Games
Silver medal – second place	1982 Brisbane	individual pursuit
Bronze medal – third place	1982 Brisbane	team pursuit
Silver medal – second place	1994 Victoria	individual pursuit
Silver medal – second place	1998 Kuala Lumpur	scratch race

Shaun Wallace (born 20 November 1961) is a British former professional cyclist who competed in two Olympic and three Commonwealth Games and rode for multiple American-based teams.

== British career ==
Wallace represented England and won a silver medal in the individual pursuit and a bronze medal in the team pursuit, at the 1982 Commonwealth Games in Brisbane, Queensland, Australia.

Twelve years later he won another silver medal in the individual pursuit at the 1994 Commonwealth Games in Victoria, British Columbia in Canada and followed this up four years later by winning a further silver medal in the scratch race, at the 1998 Commonwealth Games in Kuala Lumpur, Malaysia.

== US career ==
After successes in his native Great Britain in track cycling, including winning British Championships over distances of 1 km, 4 km and 20 km, Wallace moved to the USA where he continued his career as an amateur, and from 1986 onward as a Professional Cyclist for a variety of teams and sponsors:

- 1987: Alfa-Romeo
- 1988: Sunkyonk SKC
- 1989 Wheaties-Schwinn
- 1990: Schwinn/Pure-Power/Bowflex
- 1991: Scott-BiKyle Cycles

In 2003 Wallace was one of the inaugural inductees into the Hall of Fame at the Lehigh Valley Velodrome in Pennsylvania, where he had based from during most of his cycling career. A tribute night had been held in his honor there in 1997.

As a masters cyclist, Wallace returned to the UK in 2002 to compete for the first time at the World Masters Track Cycling Championships where he won both the 40-44 age group Pursuit, and the Points race events.

More recently (2017 and previous years), Wallace has coached at the San Diego Velodrome.

== Altitude Training and Simulation ==
Throughout his cycling career Wallace made significant use of altitude training to optimize his performance, first with trips to Colorado Springs, and later went on to be a pioneer in the application of the "Live High - Train Low" method by renting a cabin to sleep at Woodland Park CO (8465'), driving down to train on the Colorado Springs Velodrome (6035'), then driving up Pikes Peak (14,114') for an afternoon rest, and training in the evening whist breathing oxygen-enhanced air to simulate sea level (0').

In 1995 Wallace used a personal hypobaric chamber to prepare for the World Championships held in Bogota (8661') Colombia, and in 1996 took the chamber with him into the Olympic Athletes Village in Atlanta where he represented Great Britain.

The following year Wallace developed and built the world's first Altitude tent which simulated altitude by changing the composition of the gas mixture inside the tent rather than reduce the pressure. The Wallace Altitude Tent went on to become the world's first commercially available product of this type.

Wallace has continued to work in the simulated-altitude industry, developing systems for a variety of applications including pilot training at 30,000', controlled exercise and sleeping systems for athletes, and controlled oxygen-enrichment systems to provide relief from altitude-related problems for residents living in mountain locations.
