= Geoff Cooke (cyclist) =

British cyclist and coach

Personal information
- Full name: Geoffrey Turner Cooke
- Born: 26 July 1944 (age 82) Manchester, England
- Height: 5 ft 8 1/2 in (174 cm)
- Weight: 88 kg (194 lb)

Cycling career
- Sport: Cycling
- Current team: Bushhealthcare
- Discipline: Track
- Role: Rider
- Rider type: Sprinter

Amateur team
- 1960–2014: Nottingham Phoenix, Long Eaton CC, Beeston RC, Velo Club Europa, Raleigh Factory Racing, Cycling4life – Jaguar, Sherwood Pines – Bush Healthcare

Major wins
- Commonwealth Games Gold 1974, Tandem with Ernie Crutchlow; 61 BC UK National Championships; 9 European Masters Champs; 46 World Masters Championships; 7 World Masters Games Championships
Medal record
Men's track cycling
Representing England
Commonwealth Games
Gold medal – first place	1974 Christchurch	tandem

Geoff Cooke (born 26 July 1944) is a British cycling coach. He was a BCF National Cycling Coach from 1979 to 1989, a BC National Youth Sprint Coach from 2003 to 2009.

== Biography ==
Cooke was born in Crumpsall, Manchester. He competed in the Sprint and Tandem Sprint events at the 1972 Olympic Games in Munich. Cooke represented England at the 1974 Commonwealth Games in Christchurch, where he won the Gold medal in the tandem sprint event. Along with winning the Commonwealth Championship he has won World Masters titles 46 times including winning the sprint championship for seven consecutive years between 1996 and 2002, and 64 times national champion.

Cooke broke the European record in the 500m TT for riders aged 60–64, whilst on the way to winning the gold medal at the 2008 European Masters Track Cycling Championships, with a new time of 37.244 seconds. Cooke retained his title in 2009, albeit in the 65–69 age category, he also won the sprint and later on the same year took gold in the sprint and 500m TT and silver in the scratch race at the World Masters Track Championships in Sydney.

He held the post of British Cycling's national cycling coach for 10 years, 1979-1989.

Between 2006 and 2009, Cooke took part in the reality TV show The Games as a cycling coach to the participating celebrities.

Cooke was also involved in coaching cycling for DARE UK.

== Palmarès ==
1960
East midlands Division Schoolboy road Champion (Nott'm Forest Circuit)
1961
3rd National tandem sprint with Ron Davidson

Winner Nottingham Track League

1963-1966
1st Tandem Sprint, British National Track Championships with Eric Thompson

Winner Nottingham Track League

1968
1st Tandem Sprint, British National Tandem Sprint Championships -with Ian Alsop
1972
1st Tandem Sprint British National Track Championship with Dave Rowe
1974
1st Tandem Sprint, 1974 Commonwealth Games With Ernie Crutchlow
1st National Tandem Sprint with Ernie Crutchlow

Winner of the 'Leon Meredith Shield' as overall UK Track Champion

1975
1st National Tandem Sprint British National Championship with Ernie Crutchlow
1976
1st National Tandem Sprint with Paul Medhurst
1977
2nd National Tandem Sprint with Paul Medhurst

Grand Prix wins 3 GP of Manchester (Fallowfield) 1 GP of Westminster (Paddington) 2 GP of Merseyside (Kirkby)

1978
Retired from competitive Cycling
1979/89
National Sprint/track coach
1995
LVRC National sprint Champion Welwyn Garden City, 2nd 500m tt 3rd sprint World masters track Championship Manchester England

1996
1st 500m TT, World Masters Track Championships, 50-54 Category
1st Sprint, World Masters Track Championships, 50-54 Category
1st LVRC Sprint Championship Salford Park Birmingham

1997
1st Sprint, World Masters Track Championships, 50-54 Category

1998
1st Sprint, World Masters Track Championships, 50-54 Category

1999
1st Sprint, World Masters Track Championships, 55-59 Category

2000
1st Sprint, World Masters Track Championships, 55-59 Category

2001
1st Sprint, World Masters Track Championships, 55-59 Category

2002
1st Sprint, World Masters Track Championships, 55-59 Category

2003
1st Scratch Race, British National Masters Track Championships, 55-59 Category
1st Sprint, British National Masters Track Championships, 55-59 Category
1st Track TT, British National Masters Track Championships, 55-59 Category
2nd Sprint, World Masters Track Championships, 55-59 Category

2004
1st Sprint, World Masters Track Championships, 60-64 Category

2005
1st 10km points, World Masters Track Championships
1st Track TT, World Masters Track Championships
1st Sprint, World Masters Track Championships

2006
1st Track TT, World Masters Track Championships
1st Sprint, World Masters Track Championships
2007
1st European Masters Sprint and TT
1st British National Championships 1st Sprint and TT

2008
1st Track TT, European Masters Track Cycling Championships, 60-64 Category (new European record)
1st World Masters Games Australia Sprint and TT 2nd Scratch Race
1st World Masters Championships Sydney Sprint and TT 2nd Scratch race
1st East Midlands Regional Sprint Championship (all ages), first won in 1961

2009
1st Track TT, European Masters Track Cycling Championships, 65-69 Category
1st Sprint, European Masters Track Cycling Championships, 65-69 Category
1st Track TT, World Masters Track Championships, 65-69 Category
1st Sprint, World Masters Track Championships, 65-69 Category
2nd Scratch race, World Masters Track Championships, 65-69 Category

2010
1st UK National Masters Championships Sprint and TT
1st European Masters Championships Sprint and TT
1st World Masters Championships Sprint and TT 65-69

2011
UK National Masters Championship Sprint and TT
1st European Masters Championship 500m TT - 2nd Sprint
1st World Masters Championship Sprint and TT 65 - 69

2012
1st National Masters Championship Sprint and TT
1st World Masters Championship 500m TT - 2nd Sprint 65 -69
2013
1st National masters Championship Sprint and 500M TT
1st European Masters Championship 500M TT and Sprint
1st World Masters Championship 500M TT and Sprint (Number 28)
2014
1st National masters Championships Sprint, 500m TT and Scratch Race
1st World masters Championships Sprint, 500m TT and Scratch Race
1st League of Veteran Racing Cyclists Sprint and 500m TT
Veterans Achievement Award Forest Town Track League

2015
1st National masters Sprint, 500m TT and Scratch race
2nd National Masters Track Champs 2000m pursuit
1st LVRC Circuit Championships Curborough Circuit Litchfield;
1st World Masters Sprint, Time Trial and Scratch Race
1st World masters over 65 Team Pursuit

2016
1st National Masters Sprint and 500m TT
1st National Masters Scratch Race
2nd LVRC National Crit Championship Stourport on Seven circuit Winner Geoff Wiles
1st World masters Championships Sprint and 500m TT
2nd World masters Championship Scratch race
2nd World masters Championship over 65 Team pursuit
3rd World master Championship over 65 Team Sprint
1st LVRC National Sprint Newport
1st LVRC National 500m Time Trial Newport
1st LVRC National 10k Scratch Race Newport
1st LVRC National overall Track Champion over 70 years

2017
1st World masters Games Auckland and Cambridge New Zealand Criterium, Sprint, 500m TT Scratch Race and Points Race
1st National masters Championship 500m TT, Sprint, Scratch Race and Points Race
2nd LVRC National Crit Championships Birmingham business centre Winner Geoff Wiles
2nd 2017 World masters Championships LA over 65 Team Pursuit. Winners USA. Team Steve Davies, Murv Wilson, Bob Barber, self
3rd 2017 World masters Championship LA Scratch Race French 1st USA 2nd
1st 2017 World masters Championship LA 500m TT
1st 2017 World masters Championship LA Sprint
1st 2017 World masters Championship LA Points Race
1st LVRC Nationals Sprint Derby
1st LVRC Nationals 500m TT Derby
1st LVRC Nationals Points Race Derby
3rd LVRC Nationals Scratch Race Derby
1st LVRC overall Track Champion over 70 years 2017 Derby

2018
1st LVRC Track League Derby 'C' Group
1st National masters Championship Sprint,500m TT and Scratch race
2nd National masters Championship Point Race Winner Geoff Wiles
1st World masters Championship LA Sprint
1st World masters Championship LA 500m TT
1st World master Championship LA Points Race
3rd World masters Championship LA Scratch Race winner Colin Claxton New Zealand
1st LVRC National Sprint Derby
1st LVRC National 500m TT Derby
1st LVRC National Scratch Race Derby
1st LVRC National Points Race Derby
3rd LVRC National Pursuit Derby winner Geoff Wiles 2nd Graham Truelove

2019
1st National masters championships 500m TT and Sprint
2nd National masters Championships Scratch race winner Geoff Wiles
1st LVRC National Sprint Newport:
1st LVRC National 500m TT Newport
1st LVRC Points Race Newport
2nd LVRC Pursuit Newport Winner Geoff Wiles
1st World masters Championships Manchester over 65 Team Sprint Team Dave Hughes Peter Humphries Geoff Cooke
1st World masters Championships Manchester Scratch Race
1st World master Championships Manchester Sprint
2nd World master Championship Manchester 500m TT Winner James Kioss USA

2021
1st BC National masters Criterium Championship Leicester
1st BMCR National Sprint Newport
1st BMCR National 500m TT Newport
1st BMCR Points Race 40 laps Newport
1st BMCR Scratch Race 40 Laps Newport
3rd BMCR TEAM Pursuit 4000 m Newport Bushhealthcare team
3rd Sprint BC National masters Championships Winner Dave Hughes 2nd Pete Humphries
1st 500m TT BC National masters Championships
1st Scratch Race 8k BC National masters Championships
1st Points Race 10k BC National masters Championship

2022
1st Sprint BC National Masters Championship, Newport
1st 500m Time trail BC National Masters Championship, Newport
1st 2000m Pursuit BC National Masters Championship, Newport
1st 8000m Scratch Race BC National Masters Championship, Newport
1st 10,000m Points Race BC National Masters Championship, Newport
1st Sprint World masters Championships, LA USA
1st 500m Time Trial World masters Championship LA USA
1st 5000m Scratch Race World masters Championships LA USA
1st 10000m Points Race World masters Championships LA USA
3rd 2000m Pursuit World maters Championships LA USA
1st Sprint British masters Cycle Racing Nat Championships Newport
1st Keirin British maters Cycle Racing Nat. Championships Newport
1st 40k Points Race BMCR National Championships Newport
1st 500m Time Trial BMCR National Championships Newport
1st 40k Scratch Race BMCR National Championships Newport
2023
1st BMCR National Omnium Champs Newport
1st BC National Circuit Race Darley Moor
1st BC National Track Championships Sprint
1st BC National Track Championships

500m Time Trial

1st BC National Track Championships 40 lap Scratch Race
1st BC National Track Championships 40 lap Points Race
1st World masters Championships 40 lap Points Race
2nd World masters Championships sprint

2nd World masters Championships 500m Time Trial
2nd World masters Championships 20 Lap Scratch Race

2024

National Masters Track Championships Newport

1st Sprint 500m Time trial 40 Lap Points Race and 30 lap Scratch

World masters Track Championships Roubaix France

1st Scratch Race, Points Race, 500m Time Trail and 2000m Pursuit race (new world best time 80+)

2025 BC National masters Track Championships Newport

1st Sprint, 500m Time Trial, 40 Lap Scratch Race. 40 Lap Points Race and 2000m Pursuit

BMCR National Championships Newport

1st Sprint, 500m Time Trial, 40 Lap Scratch Race, 40 Lap Points Race and 20000m Pursuit

World masters Championships Roubaix France

1st Sprint, 500m Time Trail, 40 Lap Points Race and 20000m Pursuit
