= Trevor Bull =

British cyclist (1944–2009)

Personal information
- Born: 28 December 1944 Birmingham, England
- Died: 4 April 2009 (aged 64) Dudley, England
- Height: 188 cm (6 ft 2 in)
- Weight: 79 kg (174 lb)

Cycling career
- Sport: Cycling

Amateur team
- Sheldon Heath CC
Medal record
Cycling
Representing England
British Empire & Commonwealth Games
Bronze medal – third place	1966 Kingston	10 mile scratch race

Trevor Geoffrey Bull (28 December 1944 – 4 April 2009) was a British cyclist.

== Cycling career ==
He competed in the team pursuit at the 1964 Summer Olympics.

He also represented the England team and won a bronze medal in the 10 mile scratch race, at the 1966 British Empire and Commonwealth Games in Kingston, Jamaica.

Bull was a four times British track champion, winning the British National Individual Sprint Championships in 1975, two Madison titles (1969 & 1970) with Tony Gowland and a team pursuit title (1965).
