= Terrence Tinsley =

British cyclist

Terry Tinsley
Personal information
- Born: 6 July 1957 (age 69) St Helens, Merseyside, England

Cycling career
- Sport: Cycling

Amateur team
- Manchester Wheelers
Medal record
Cycling
Representing England
Commonwealth Games
Bronze medal – third place	1982 Brisbane	time trial

Terrence Tinsley (born 6 July 1957) is a British former cyclist. He competed in the sprint and the 1000m time trial events at the 1980 Summer Olympics.

== Cycling career ==
In addition to his Olympic Games representation he also represented England and competed in the 10 miles scratch race and 1,000 metres match race and won a bronze medal in the 1 km time trial, at the 1982 Commonwealth Games in Brisbane, Queensland, Australia.

Tinsley was a 12 times British track champion, winning the Sprint title in 1980, 1983, 1984 and 1985, the Time Trial title in 1981, the Tandem title from 1980 to 1982, the Omnium in 1983 and the Keirin from 1983 to 1985.
