= Brenda Atkinson =

English cyclist

Personal information
- Born: 27 December 1955 Bradford, West Yorkshire, England

Cycling career
- Sport: Cycling
- Disciplines: Track and Road cycling
- Role: Rider

Brenda Atkinson (born 1955) is an English female former track and road cyclist.

== Cycling career ==
Atkinson is a multiple British track champion and British road race champion, winning four British National Individual Sprint Championships (1978, 1979, 1980 & 1982) and three road race titles in 1978, 1979 and 1982.
