= Faith Murray =

Former English Track Cyclist

Personal information
- Born: 1 February 1951 Stoke-on-Trent, Staffordshire, England

Cycling career
- Sport: Cycling
- Discipline: Track cycling
- Role: Rider

Amateur team
- 1972–1977: City of Stoke

Faith Murray (born 1951) is an English female former track cyclist.

== Cycling career ==
Murray was a revolutionary women's cyclist winning the first six British National Individual Sprint Championships open to women, from 1972 until 1977. She represented Great Britain at the 1976 UCI Road World Championships.
