= Paul Swinnerton =

Personal information
- Nationality: England
- Born: 12 May 1958 (age 68) Fenton, Stoke-on-Trent, England

Paul Swinnerton (born 1958) is a male retired British cyclist.

== Cycling career ==
Swinnerton won the National Tandem Sprint Championship, the Amateur Individual Sprint and the National Kilometre Time Trial British National Track Championships in 1979 and 1981 also winning the National 500m Grass Track 4 times and the 8km National grass Title 4 times, turned professional in 1984.

He represented England in the 1,000 metres match sprint and the 1 km time trial, at the 1978 Commonwealth Games in Edmonton, Alberta, Canada.

== Family ==
The Swinnerton family were a cycling family, Swinnerton Cycles was founded in 1915, in Victoria Road, Fenton, Stoke-on-Trent. Roy Swinnerton (1925-2013 and a national grass champion in 1956) and his wife Doris (née Salt) took over the shop in 1956 and set up a cycling club called Stoke ACCS during 1970. They had seven children.

Paul's twin sister Catherine was a two times British road race champion, Bernadette won a World Road race silver medal in 1969, Margaret, Mark were all British internationals and Bernard and Frances also competed for the club.
