= Michael Bennett (cyclist) =

British cyclist (born 1949)

Mick Bennett
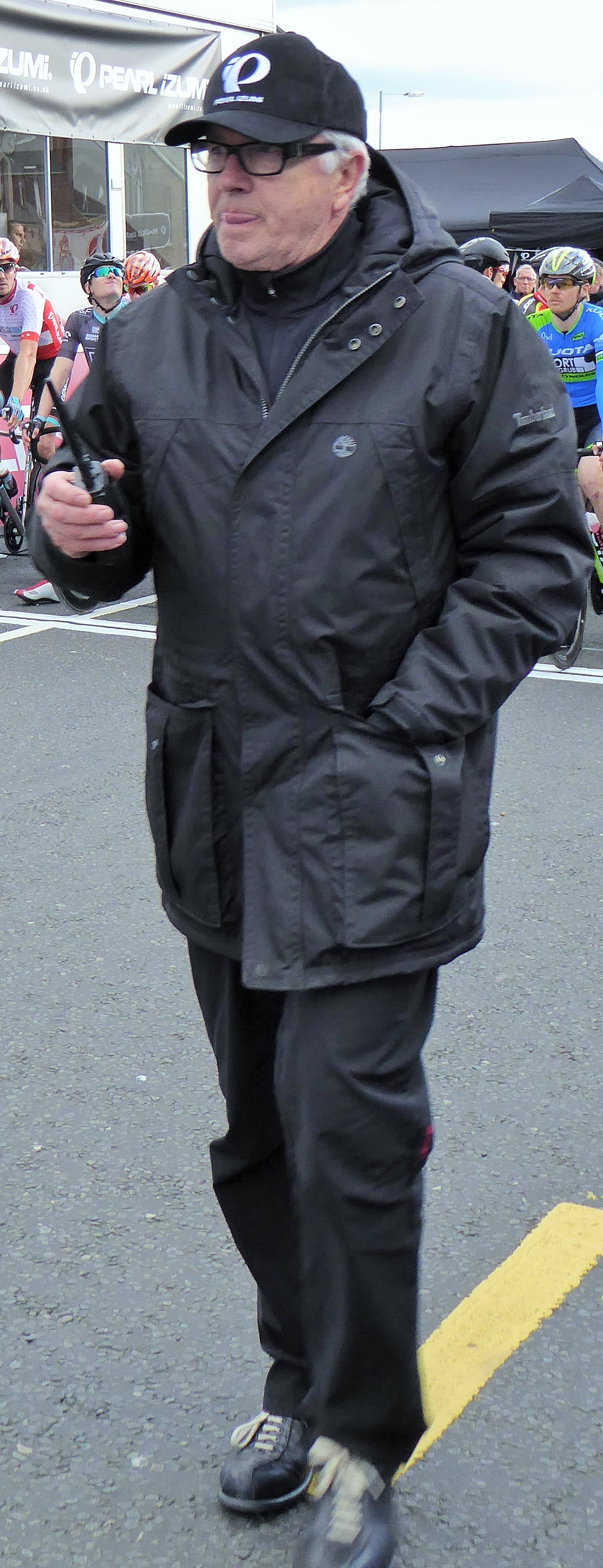
- Bennett in 2015

Personal information
- Born: 8 June 1949 (age 77) Birmingham, England

Cycling career
- Sport: Cycling
Medal record
Men's cycling
Representing Great Britain
Olympic Games
Bronze medal – third place	1972 Munich	Team Pursuit
Bronze medal – third place	1976 Montreal	Team Pursuit
Representing England
British Commonwealth Games
Gold medal – first place	1974 Christchurch	Team Pursuit

Michael John "Mick" Bennett (born 8 June 1949, Birmingham) is a British former cyclist and cycle race promoter.

== Cycling career ==
He won the bronze medal in Team Pursuit in the 1972 Munich and 1976 Montreal Games.

He represented England in the 1 km time trial, at the 1970 British Commonwealth Games in Edinburgh, Scotland. Four years later he competed in the scratch and pursuit disciplines and won a gold medal in the 4,000 metres team pursuit at the 1974 British Commonwealth Games in Christchurch, New Zealand.

He was five times a British champion winning the British National Sprint in 1977, two British National Madison Championships (1973 & 1975) and two British National Individual Time Trial Championships (1971 & 1972).

Bennett originally took up cycling as part of a programme of rehabilitation after developing Osgood–Schlatter disease. In 2004, Bennett formed Sweetspot Management, which organises the Tour of Britain, the Tour Series, The Women's Tour and (in collaboration with the London Marathon) RideLondon.
