= David Rowe (cyclist) =

British cyclist

David Rowe OLY
Personal information
- Nationality: British (English)
- Born: 2 March 1944 (age 82) London, England
- Height: 172 cm (5 ft 8 in)
- Weight: 71 kg (157 lb)

Sport
- Club: 34th Nomads CC

David John Rowe (born 2 March 1944) is a former British international cyclist who competed at the 1972 Summer Olympics.

== Biogeraphy ==
At the 1972 Olympic Games in Munich, Rowe competed in the tandem event.

He also represented the England team at the 1970 British Commonwealth Games in Edinburgh, Scotland, where he participated in the 1,000 metres match sprint event.
