= Dave Le Grys =

David Le Grys
Personal information
- Full name: David Le Grys
- Nickname: Legro
- Born: 10 August 1955 (age 71) Carshalton, Surrey, England, United Kingdom
- Height: 1.75 m (5 ft 9 in)

Cycling career
- Sport: Cycling
- Disciplines: Track and road cycling
- Role: Rider and Coach

Amateur teams
- 1998: Team Brite
- 2000-2004: DataPhonics RT
- 2005-2008: VC St Raphael/Waites Contracts
- 2009-: Team Terminator

Major wins
- World Masters Champion x 25 (United Kingdom) National Champion x 16 (at least)
Medal record
Cycling
Representing England
Commonwealth Games
Silver medal – second place	1978 Edmonton	tandem

David Le Grys (born 10 August 1955) is an English track cyclist, World Masters track champion, and cycling coach who has competed at international level for his country.

== Cycling career ==
He represented England and won a silver medal in the tandem sprint with Trevor Gadd, at the 1978 Commonwealth Games in Edmonton, Alberta, Canada.

He represented Great Britain at the Olympic Games, world championships and grand prix and was a multiple national champion from 1973 to 1987, and was an élite professional.

=== Palmarès ===
(England) Commonwealth Games silver medal
1978 tandem sprint
(United Kingdom) British National Individual Sprint Championships
1982, 1986, 1987
(United Kingdom) British National Tandem Sprint Championships
1976
(United Kingdom) British National Keirin Championships
1987
(United Kingdom) British and Coomwealth cycling speed record
110 mph, 1986

== Coaching ==
Having turned professional in 1982, Le Grys retired from cycling in 1987 for 10 years but carried on coaching. He became the British Cycling Federation's national track coach in 1989, but retired in July 1994 in protest at Paul McHugh's omission from England's 1994 Commonwealth Games squad. In 1986 he set both the British absolute speed record at 110 mph behind a pace car with faring and the World roller cycling speed record at 126.6 mph. He was also involved with marathon running and duathlons. Best marathon 2 hours 36 minutes.

- 1982 to 1986 Eastern Centre of Excellence Track Coach and Manager
- 1986 Qualified club coach ABCC
- 1989 to 1994 BCF National Track Coach
- 1990 Qualified Senior coach ABCC
- 1992 Represented GB in Olympic Games as coach
- 1998 Coach and manager for biggest professional cycling team in UK, Team Brite
- 1999 Mastercoach cycling/triathlon/athletetic coach www.mastercoach.co.uk
- 2001 Coachwise coach of the year award
- 2000 to 2004 Club coach for DataPhonics RT Development squad for 13- to 23-year-olds.

== Masters cycling ==
Le Grys returned to competitive cycling 1997. He won the 500m time trial in the 50–54 age group at the 2006 UCI Track Cycling Masters World Championships at Manchester Velodrome. At the 2007 Championships, held at the Dunc Gray Velodrome in Sydney, he won gold in the 500m Time Trial (50-54 age group) with a WR of 34.01 and silver in the 750m Team Sprint. Le Grys has won 25 World Masters titles in the sprint, team sprint, 750 and 500m time trials. 2013 was a good year for Le Grys, he won three European Masters track championships, two World Masters Track Championships, Essex Sports Personality of the year and married Tracy Baker, former wife of Essex cyclist Gary Baker.

Open heart surgery 2015 at Papworth Hospital repairing leaky heart valve (Mitral valve) and back Surgery 2016 Royal London Orthopaedic Hospital Back racing again and has medalled in World Masters in USA (Los Angeles) 2017 and British Masters Championships 2017-2018, however was well below the fitness/strength he is used to. "Legro" as he is known to most is focussing now is the latter part of his life running training camps in Majorca

=== Palmarès ===
(United Kingdom) National veteran sprint champion
1997, 1998, 1999, 2000 & 2001
(United Kingdom) National masters sprint champion
2002, 2004 & 2005 2010, 2012
(United Kingdom) National masters 750m TT champion
2002 & 2003
(United Kingdom) National masters 500m TT champion
2005, 2006, 2007, 2008 2009 2010 2011 2012 2013
World masters sprint champion
1997, 2001 & 2002 2013
World masters 750m TT champion
1999, 2000, 2001 & 2002
World masters 500m TT champion
2005, 2006, 2007, 2009 2010 2011 2012 2013
World masters Olympic sprint champion
1997, 1999, 2000, 2002, 2003, 2004, 2005 & 2006

25 times World masters champion to date

(United Kingdom) European Masters Champion 500m TT 2008, 2009, 2012, 2013
(United Kingdom) European Team Sprint Champion 500m TT 2008, 2009, 2012, 2013, 2017
