= Ian Hallam =

British cyclist (born 1948)

Personal information
- Born: 24 November 1948 (age 77) Basford, Nottingham, England

Cycling career
- Sport: Cycling

Amateur team
Medal record
Representing Great Britain
Men's cycling
Olympic Games
Bronze medal – third place	1972 Munich	Team Pursuit
Bronze medal – third place	1976 Montreal	Team Pursuit
Representing England
Commonwealth Games
Gold medal – first place	1970 Edinburgh	4,000m individual pursuit
Gold medal – first place	1974 Christchurch	4,000m individual pursuit
Gold medal – first place	1974 Christchurch	4,000m team pursuit
Bronze medal – third place	1974 Christchurch	10 mile scratch
Bronze medal – third place	1974 Christchurch	1 Km time trial

Ian Hallam (born 24 November 1948), is a retired British international cyclist who competed at three Olympic Games.

== Early life ==
Hallam completed his A-levels at the Henry Mellish Grammar School. He studied Dentistry at the University of Birmingham. Living in Bramcote, he worked in Derby.

== Cycling career ==
He competed at three Olympic Games in both individual and team pursuit and won the Olympic Bronze medal in Team Pursuit in 1972 Munich and 1976 Montreal Games.

He represented England and won a gold medal in the 4,000 metres individual pursuit, at the 1970 British Commonwealth Games in Edinburgh, Scotland.

Four years later he won four medals at the 1974 British Commonwealth Games in Christchurch, New Zealand; he won double gold in the 4,000 metres individual pursuit and 4,000 metres team pursuit in addition to two bronze medals for the scratch race and time trial.

A winner of 25 national track titles and was also a member of the British pursuit squad that twice finished as runners-up at the World Track Championships. Hallam also had some success as a road cyclist and placed third in the British Road Race Championships in 1974. He also won two stages of the Milk Race (the amateur tour of Britain) in 1976. Ian turned professional at the relatively advanced age of 30 and spent five moderately successful seasons with KP Crisps pro team. He still rides in masters events.

Ian was awarded an MBE for services to sport in 1978, and after retiring from cycling, took up windsurfing and went on to finish 5th in the Windsurfing World championships.

=== National titles ===
- Sprint (1978, 1979, 1981)
- Derny (1982)
- Madison (1973, 1975)
- Omnium (1979, 1980, 1981, 1982)
- Pursuit (1969, 1970, 1971, 1972, 1973, 1974, 1979)
- Scratch (1975, 1976, 1977)
- Time Trial (1970, 1973, 1974, 1975, 1976)

== Dentistry and aesthetics career ==
Hallam qualified as a dentist at Birmingham University in 1971, and after working in general practices in Nottingham, Derby, and Havant, bought a practice in Fareham, before establishing Meon Dental in 1988. He later established Meon Face, an aesthetic clinic in Petersfield, near Portsmouth.

He is a member of the British Academy of Cosmetic Dentistry, the Association of Dental Implantology and theInternational Academy of Advanced Facial Aesthetics and was a finalist for 'Cosmetic Dentist of the Year' at the Aesthetic Awards 2012 and winner of the award for Facial Aesthetics at the Aesthetic Dentistry Awards (2013 and 2015), Smile Awards (2012 and 2011) and MyFaceMyBody Awards (2013). Most recently he won the Highly Commended award for ‘Dentist of the Year (South)’ at The Dental Awards 2015 and was a finalist for 'Cosmetic Dentist of the Year’.

Hallam has been a visiting clinical teacher in facial aesthetics for the MSc course in Aesthetics at King's College London and has lectured at numerous aesthetic conferences. He is an accredited UK trainer for Silhouette Soft thread lifts and a key opinion leader for Venus Viva and Med Aesthetics and is a judge for the Aesthetic Dentistry Awards, has been a judge for the MyFaceMyBody Awards Australia, and has been invited onto the editorial board of the popular magazine, Aesthetic Dentistry Today. He has seen 21 of his articles and case presentations published.

== Personal life ==
Ian is married, with a son who works for an international investment bank, a daughter who works in the aesthetics industry, a younger daughter who has a degree in Drama and a Master’s Degree in Creative Arts and Mental Health, a step-son and four grandchildren.
