= Saffron Lane sports centre =

Athletics facility in Leicester, England

Coordinates: 52°36′48.90″N 1°8′7.60″W

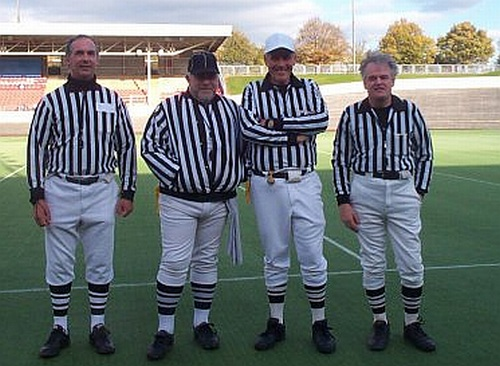
An American Football officiating team at Saffron Lane in 2001, the banked velodrome track and north stand can be seen in the background

Saffron Lane sports centre is a large 8 lane (9 lane straight) 400 metre synthetic floodlight lit running track which includes a steeplechase water jump, in Leicester, England. It is home to the city's top two athletics clubs, the sprint and field specialists Leicester Coritanian A.C., Saffron AC and the middle and long distance specialists, OWLS AC Leicester. Other athletics squads train at the track, namely Leicester Walking Club, some members of University of Leicester athletics team among other local running clubs.

== History ==
The track opened as a synthetic 'En-Tout-Cas' on 6 May 1967 and was the first track of its type built in England. The complex formerly also included Leicester's cycle velodrome, however this side of the complex is subject to planning permission for a new housing estate. The velodrome hosted the British National Stayers Championships and the British National Track Championships for several decades before it fell into disrepair due to lack of funds. The venue hosted British and World track cycling and Road Racing championships in August 1970. The cycle track was improved specially for the event which was televised all over the world. Another first meant that sponsors were allowed to buy sections of the track to utilise for advertising purposes. This was also the first time that a public road - the A46 - was closed in the UK to allow the Road Race to take place:- See The Benny Foster Story published by Fretwell 1971.

In 2006 the centre received a £1.4 million facelift courtesy of Leicester City Council. As part of the facelift new state of the art field sports equipment was purchased, a new purpose built changing facility was built and a replacement synthetic track surface was laid. The development also includes facilities for both disabled and able bodied athletes. The complex was officially reopened by Jonathan Edwards in July 2006.

Saffron Lane Athletics Centre holds the Schools' City Athletics each year. The fastest boys and girls from each school go head to head in running and throwing events.

== The end of the Velodrome ==
Once regarded as one of the best cycling facilities in the country, the track has been empty for nearly a decade and the velodrome is being demolished. The 3,100 seater velodrome on Saffron Lane in Leicester was built in the late 1960s for the 1970 World Cycling Championship (based in Leicester) and was a state-of-the-art cycling track attracting top cyclists from all over the country. At the centre of the track was an all-weather pitch, once home of the Leicester Panthers American Football team and hosting the national British American Football Association's annual finals Bowl Game for nearly ten seasons (2002 when it was relocated to Lee Valley Park).

Since 2001 the story of the stadium has been one of decay, vandalism and even arson. A decision about its future had to be taken. BBC Leicester's Julie Mayer spoke to people who are both for and against fighting to keep the velodrome. The city council decided that the stadium should be razed to the ground and the demolition plant moved in, but the decision proved controversial. Cllr. Dale Keeling who represents the area said "The residents and I have had to fight extremely hard to convince the city council to invest in the velodrome to make it a centre of sporting excellence again. The location is ideal and it has a large car park."

A local resident, Zelda Rubinstein who has watched the velodrome's decline with sadness said: "I've been here for about eleven years and I'd be very sorry to see this facility go. It could be used for young people. We need open spaces. We're quite built up here. I look out of my windows and I see what's going on. There was a constant stream of fire engines. There has been little in the way of security."

Preceded by Sportpaleis; Antwerp	UCI Track Cycling World Championships; Venue; 1970	Succeeded by Luigi Ganna Velodrome; Varese
Preceded by Brno Velodrome; Brno	UCI Track Cycling World Championships; Venue; 1982	Succeeded by Oerlikon Velodrome; Zürich
