= British National Omnium Championships =

British cycling event

The British National Omnium Championships are held annually as part of the British National Track Championships organised by British Cycling. A women's championship was held for the first time in 2017.

== Elite ==
=== Men's Senior Race ===
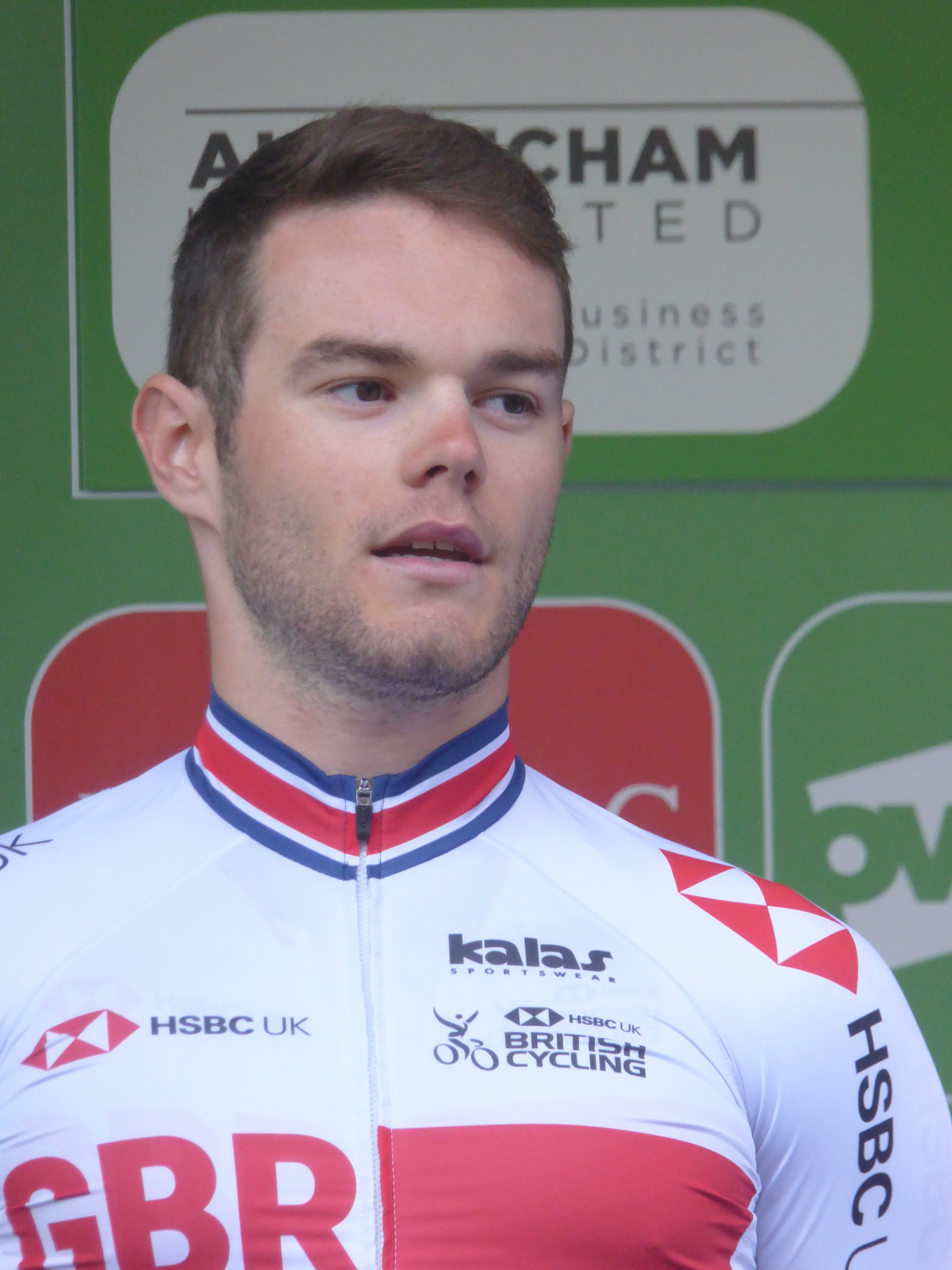
Matt Walls, twice winner

Year	Gold	Silver	Bronze	Ref
1979	Ian Hallam	Mick Bennett	Steve Heffernan	
1980	Ian Hallam	Mick Bennett	Steve Heffernan	
1981	Ian Hallam	Steve Heffernan	Tony Doyle	
1982	Ian Hallam	Tony Doyle	Phil Thomas	
1983	Terry Tinsley	Mick Bennett	Phil Thomas	
1984	Glen Mitchell	Paul Swinnerton	Terry Tinsley	
1985	Tony James	Nigel Dean	Ian Banbury	
1986	Glen Mitchell	Ian Fagan	Dave Miller	
1987	Dave Miller	Russell Williams	Rob Muzio	
1988	Jon Walshaw	Phil Thomas	Dave Miller	
1989	Gary Coltman			
1990	Gary Coltman	Jon Walshaw	Colin Sturgess	
1991	Gary Coltman	Jon Walshaw	Russell Williams	
1992	Gary Coltman	Jon Walshaw	Russell Williams	
1993	Gary Coltman	Anthony Stirrat	Russell Williams	
1994	Antony Wallis	Gary Coltman	Russell Williams	
1995	Rob Hayles	Anthony Stirrat	Nicholas Hall	
1996	Rob Hayles			
1997	Peter Jacques			
1998	Peter Jacques			
1999	Peter Jacques	James Taylor	Craig MacLean	
2000	James Taylor			
2001	Bryan Taylor	James Taylor		
2002	James Taylor			
2003	James Taylor	Jamie Norfolk	Bryan Taylor	
2004	Ben Elliott	James McCallum	Mark Kelly	
2005	Mark Kelly		Anthony Stirrat	
2006	Tony Gibb		Anthony Stirrat	
2007 & 2008 cancelled
2009	James McCallum	Kevin Barclay	Matthew Haynes	
2010	Alistair Rutherford	John McClelland	David Martin	
2011	Jon Mould	Simon Yates	Adam Yates	
2012	Simon Yates	Joseph Kelly	George Atkins	
2013	Jon Mould	Christopher Latham	Chris Lawless	
2017	Matthew Walls	Ethan Hayter	Joe Holt	
2018	Matthew Walls	Harry Tanfield	Joe Holt	
2019	Ethan Hayter	Fred Wright	Rhys Britton	
2020 & 2021 not held due to COVID-19
2022	Oscar Nilsson-Julien	Mark Stewart	William Tidball	
2023	Rhys Britton	William Perrett	Jacob Vaughan	
2024	William Roberts	Michael Gill	Frank Longstaff	
2025	Ben Swift	Mark Stewart	Lewis Askey	

=== Women's Senior Race ===
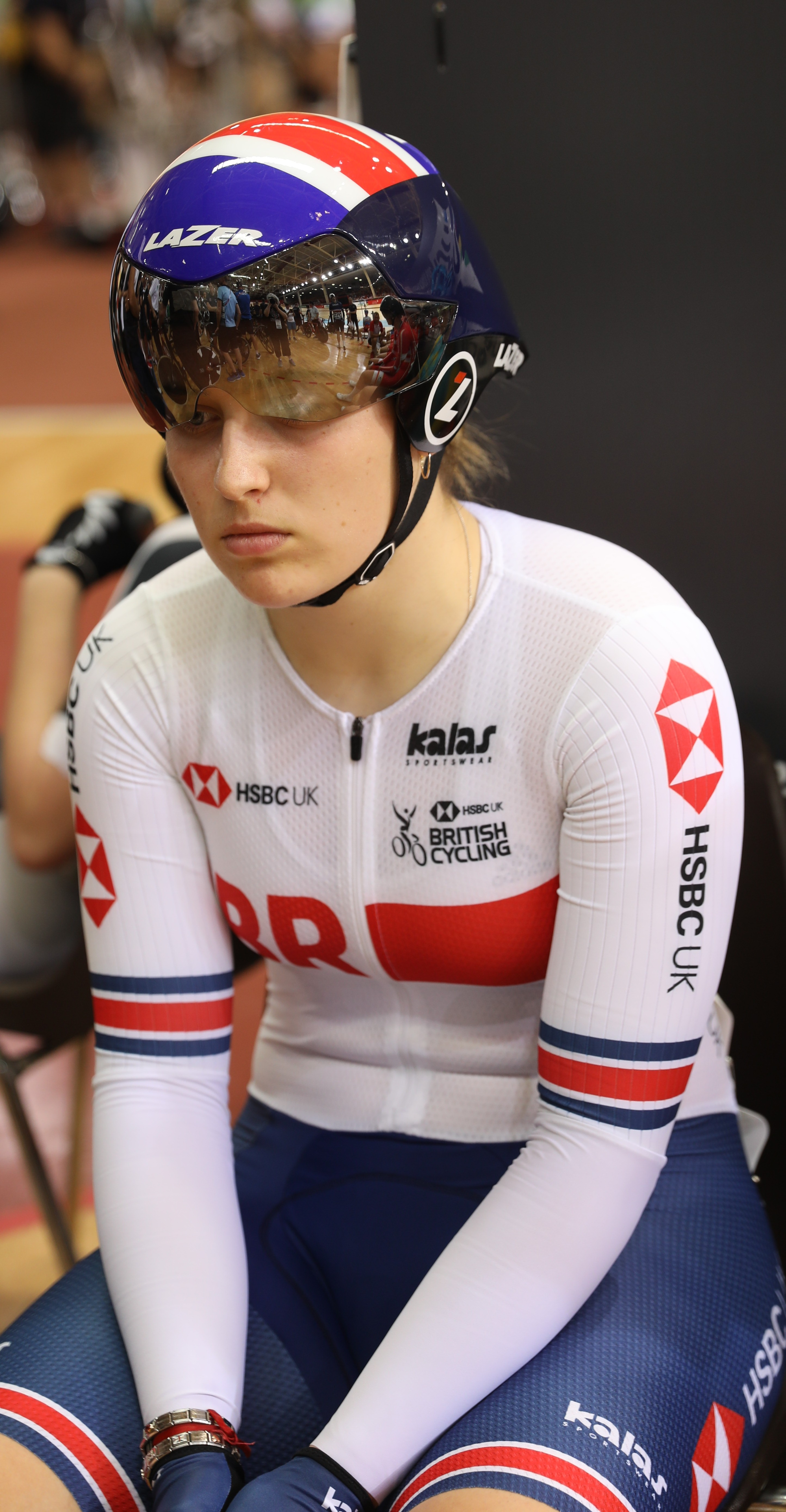
Ella Barnwell

Year	Gold	Silver	Bronze	Ref
2017	Katie Archibald	Elinor Barker	Emily Nelson	
2018	Laura Kenny	Jessica Roberts	Neah Evans	
2019	Ella Barnwell	Anna Docherty	Anna Morris	
2020 & 2021 not held due to COVID-19
2022	Sophie Lewis	Neah Evans	Maddie Leech	
2023	Grace Lister	Dannielle Khan	Lucy Nelson	
2024				
2025	Anna Morris	Katie Archibald	Jessica Roberts	

== Junior results ==
Extended content

Male Youth Under 14 Race

Year	Gold	Silver	Bronze
1999	Mark Cavendish	Arron Biggs	Jack Bentley
2000	Geraint Thomas	Peter Bissell	Matthew Wood
2001	Tom Smith	Andrew Hill	Ross Sander
2003	Shane Charlton	Andrew Fenn	Joshua Hargreaves
2004	Andrew Fenn	Alex Aldham-Breary	Jack Bentley
2005	Michael McMahon	Thomas Wieckowski	Christopher Whorrall
2006	Daniel McLay	Jordan Hargreaves	Felix English
2007	Robert Lambton	Jordan Hargreaves	Jon Dibben
2008	Alex Minting	Jon Dibben	Matthew Rotherham
2009	Daniel Maslin	Jacob Ragen	Robbie Westwood
2010	Jack Hoyle	Max Nethell	Tristan Robbins
2011	Dylan Cordukes	Joseph Fry	Joel Partington
2012	Jack Plumley	Reece Wood	Rhys Britton
2013	Rhys Britton	William Turnbull	Daniel Tulett
2014	Matt Burke	Charley Calvert	Alistair Fielding
2015	Myles Will	Dylan Clinton	Fin Jenner
2016	Oscar Nilsson-Julien	Evan Richards	Hamish McLaren

Male Youth Under 12 Race

Year	Gold	Silver	Bronze
1999	Ross Sander	Tom Smith	P Gough
2000	Matthew Rowe	Scott Elliott	Luke Rowe
2001	Andrew Fenn	Bonar Lizaitis	Tony Lock
2003	Joanne Wilman	Frances Austin	Laura Trott
2004	M Baxter	W Couch	M Berry
2005	Jordan Hargreaves	Patrick Galbraith	Joshua Papworth
2006	Jon Dibben	Robbie Westwood	Christopher Latham
2007	Jason Regan	Robbie Westwood	Daniel Maslin
2008	Max Nethell	Charlie Tanfield	Harvey Watson
2009	Joel Partington	D Couch	Dylan Cordukes
2010	Tomos Owens	Jack Plumley	Fred Wright
2011	Tomos Owens	Fred Wright	James Tillett
2012	Nathan Hawthorn	Lewis Askey	Halley Woods
2013	Lewis Askey	Alfred George	George sloan

Female Youth Under 14 Race

Year	Gold	Silver	Bronze
2003	Bridie Hindle	Lucy Richards	Emma Trott
2004	Alex Greenfield	J Wilman	H Scott
2005	Laura Trott	Sophie Terry	Becky James
2006	Laura Trott	Hannah Manley	Kayleigh Brogan
2007	Hannah Barnes	Harriet Owen	Laura Allen
2008	Lucy Garner	Emily Kay	Elinor Barker
2009	Emily Kay	Amy Jacobs	Rebecca Hunt
2010	Grace Garner	Ellie Coster	Emily Haycox
2011	Grace Garner	Megan Barker	Emily Haycox
2012	Sophie Capewell	Jessica Roberts	Eleanor Dickinson
2013	Jessica Roberts	Sophie Williams	Emily Tillett
2014	Anna Docherty	Pfeiffer Georgi	Ellie Park
2025	Catrin Thomas	Annie Fearne	Seraphina Clegg

Female Youth Under 12 Race

Year	Gold	Silver	Bronze
2005	Laura Trott	Hannah Manley	Laura Allen
2005	Hannah Manley	Laura Allen	Manon Morgans
2006	Lucy Garner	Emily Kay	Jessica Anderson
2007	Emily Kay	Esther Colman	Emily Barnes
2008	Angela Eggleton	Megan Barker	Kimberley English
2009	Grace Garner	Megan Barker	Emily Haycox
2010	Sophie Capewell	Charlotte Broughton	Jessica Roberts
2011	Jessica Roberts	Charlotte Cole-Hossain	Sophie Williams
2012	Lucy Nelson	Megan James	Bethany Lewis
2013	Anna Armstrong	Elynor Backstedt	Ella Barnwell
2014	Emma Finucane	Becky Surridge	Danielle Parker
