= 1992 British National Track Championships =

- Venue: Leicester, England
- Date(s): 15–23 August 1992
- Velodrome: Leicester Velodrome

The 1992 British National Track Championships were a series of track cycling competitions held from 15–23 August 1992 at the Leicester Velodrome.

== Medal summary ==
=== Men's Events ===
Event	Gold	Silver	Bronze
1 Km Time Trial	Anthony Stirrat	Steve Paulding	Stephen Whitcombe
Amateur Sprint	Stewart Brydon	Steve Paulding	Gary Hibbert
Professional Sprint	Paul McHugh	Gary Coltman	Russell Williams
Professional Keirin	Paul McHugh	Gary Coltman	Russell Williams
Professional 5,000 Individual Pursuit			
Amateur 4,000 Individual Pursuit	Chris Boardman	Bryan Steel	Stuart Shand
Team pursuit	Team Haverhill	VC St Raphael	Dinnington RC
Amateur 50Km Points	Simon Lillistone	Bryan Steel	Adrian Allen
Amateur 20Km Scratch	Anthony Stirrat	Steve Clark	Jeff Snodin
Madison	Simon Lillistone; Bryan Steel	Gary Coltman; Russell Williams	Jon Walshaw; Spencer Wingrave
Preofessional Omnium	Gary Coltman	Jon Walshaw	Russell Williams
Amateur 1Km Tandem	Clayton Velo; Peter Boyd; Gary Hibbert	Stoke AC; Chris Pyatt; Martin Phillips	Kirkby / Ellan Vannin; John Saysell; Adrian Mooney
50 Km Derny	Bryan Taylor; Paul Wingrave	Adrian Krakiewicz; Chris Denman	Paul Gerrard; Noel Worby

=== Women's Events ===
Event	Gold	Silver	Bronze
1 Km time trial	Sally Dawes	Louise Jones	Sally Hodge
Sprint	Wendy Everson	Claire Rushworth	Sally Hodge
Individual Pursuit	Sally Dawes	Louise Jones	Rachelle Jones
Keirin	Sally Dawes		
30Km Points	Sally Hodge	Sally Dawes	Rachelle Jones
