= British National Derny Championships =

British cycling national competition

The British National Derny Championships are an annual bicycle racing event held in the United Kingdom.

The event was originally run as a motor paced event behind the larger stayer motors, but in 2000 a demonstration championship was run using derny bikes, opening the championship up to wider participation. The first official championship took place in 2001 for the Ron Pugsley Trophy. The British Cycling National Derny Paced Championship is run over 30 km.

The event was known as the amateur motor paced championships from 1970 to 1993, and simply the motor paced championships from 1994 to 1999; it was held at a distance of 50 km. A professional motor paced championship was run in 1982 over one hour.

The event is still often referred to as the motor paced or stayer championships, but this is a misnomer, because a motor paced or stayers race is one where the pacing machine is a modified motorbike of anything from 100cc to 2000cc engine size which has a roller mounted behind the back wheel. The cyclist or follower uses a bicycle which has a small front wheel and trailing front forks, which if it hits the roller merely spins the roller without causing any damage. Motor pacing lost popularity in the late 1990s due to its esoteric nature and Derny racing was introduced. There is a move by Motor pacing fans to revive the Motor Paced Championships in the future. Motor Pacing is still very popular on the continent.

A Derny is a two-stroke engine assisted bicycle and the cyclist or follower can ride a normal track bike, making the discipline readily accessible to most track cyclists. Always held on a cycling track, the riders follow a derny throughout the race. The rider of the derny is known as their pacer. The event is classified as a team event, with both the rider and pacer being awarded medals and title of National Champion. The event is relatively long for track racing, and usually held separately to the British National Track Championships which consist of multiple shorter events. A women's championship over 15 km was first introduced in 2005 and won by the Scottish rider Katie Cullen paced by Ian Smith.

== Event history ==
- Amateur 50 km Motor Paced Championship (1970–1993)
- Amateur and Professional editions (1982)
- Open 50 km Motor Paced Championship (1994–1999)
- Open 30 km Derny Championship (from 2000)

== Past winners ==
=== Men ===
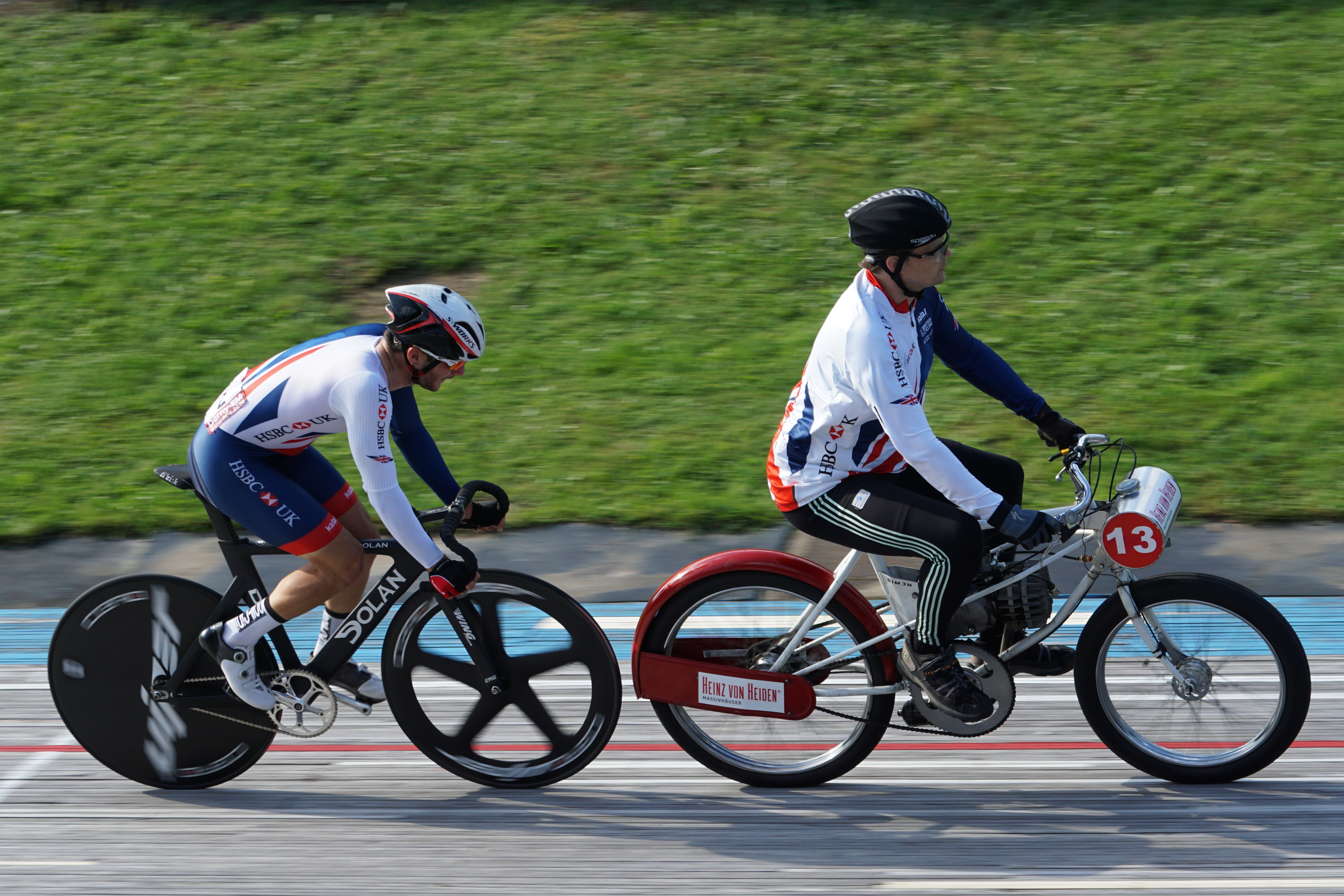
Oliver Moors behind the Derny pacer George Gilbert, representing Great Britain at the 2017 UEC Derny European Championships

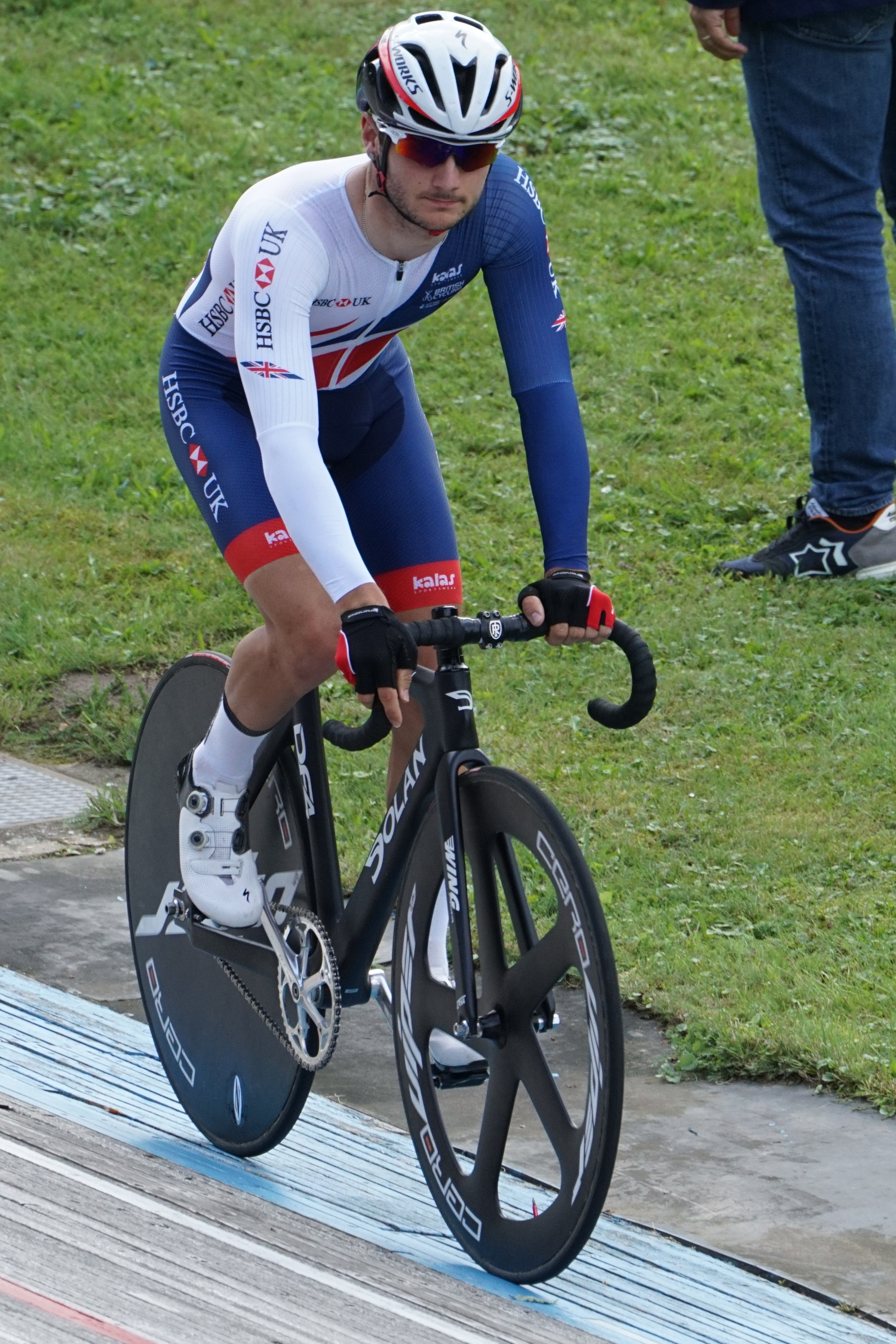
Oliver Moors, five time champion

| Year | Location | Gold | Silver | Bronze | Ref |
|---|---|---|---|---|---|
| 1970 | Manchester | Roy Cox; Jim Patterson (p) | | | |
| 1971 | Leicester Velodrome | Reg Barnett | Sid Barras | Tony Gowland | |
| 1972 | Leicester Velodrome | Roy Cox; Jack Collins (p) | Tom Moloney | Morgan Jackson | |
| 1973 | Leicester Velodrome | Roy Cox; Jack Collins (p) | Phil Buckley | John Hall | |
| 1974 | Leicester Velodrome | Roy Cox; Jack Collins (p) | Rik Notley | John Hall | |
| 1975 | Leicester Velodrome | Roy Cox; Jack Collins (p) | Rik Notley | John Hall | |
| 1976 | Leicester Velodrome | Rik Notley | Alan Johnson | Richard Dixon | |
| 1977 | Leicester Velodrome | Rik Notley; Howard Broughton (p) | Alan Johnson; Alan Gibb (p) | John Hall; Les Robinson (p) | |
| 1978 | Leicester Velodrome | Alan Johnson | Rik Notley | Paul Gerrard | |
| 1979 | Leicester Velodrome | Alan Johnson | Paul Gerrard | Des Fretwell | |
| 1980 | Leicester Velodrome | Paul Gerrard | Des Fretwell | Rik Notley | |
| 1981 | Leicester Velodrome | Paul Gerrard | Des Fretwell | Mick Coles | |
| 1982 | Leicester Velodrome | Des Fretwell | Geoff Armstrong | Steve Wakefield | |
| 1982+ | Leicester Velodrome | Ian Hallam | Phil Thomas | Paul Gerrard | |
| 1983 | Leicester Velodrome | Andy Hurford | Steve Bent | Bob Barber | |
| 1984 | Leicester Velodrome | Ian Donohue; Howard Broughton (p) | Nick Lett; Paul Wingrave (p) | Adrian Adgar | |
| 1985 | Leicester Velodrome | Nick Lett; Paul Wingrave (p) | George Dixon; Jack Collins (p) | Adrian Adgar | |
| 1986 | Leicester Velodrome | Nick Lett; Paul Wingrave (p) | Des Fretwell; Howard Broughton (p) | George Dixon; Jack Collins (p) | |
| 1987 | Leicester Velodrome | Nigel Brown; Jack Collins (p) | Nick Lett; Paul Wingrave (p) | John Dale; Clive Murden (p) | |
| 1988 | Leicester Velodrome | Nick Lett; Paul Wingrave (p) | Nigel Brown; Jack Collins (p) | John Dale; Clive Murden (p) | |
| 1989 | Leicester Velodrome | Nick Lett; Paul Wingrave (p) | John Dale; Clive Murden (p) | Levon Pegg | |
| 1990 | Leicester Velodrome | Nick Lett; Paul Wingrave (p) | John Dale; Clive Murden (p) | Adrian Krakiewicz | |
| 1991 | Leicester Velodrome | Bryan Taylor; Paul Wingrave (p) | John Dale; Clive Murden (p) | Peter Kennedy | |
| 1992 | Leicester Velodrome | Bryan Taylor | Adrian Krakiewicz | Paul Gerrard | |
| 1993 | Leicester Velodrome | Paul Curran; Howard Broughton (p) | Spencer Wingrave; Paul Wingrave (p) | Paul Gerrard; Noel Worby (p) | |
| 1994 | Herne Hill | Paul Curran; Howard Broughton (p) | Spencer Wingrave; Paul Wingrave (p) | Russell Williams; Colin Denman (p) | |
| 1995 | Herne Hill | Paul Curran; Howard Broughton (p) | Spencer Wingrave; Paul Wingrave (p) | Norman Dunroy; Noel Worby (p) | |
| 1996 | Herne Hill | Paul Curran; Noel Worby (p) | Russell Williams; Colin Denman (p) | Keith Reid; Derek Marloe (p) | |
| 1997 | Herne Hill | Bryan Steel; Paul Wingrave (p) | Russell Williams; Colin Denman (p) | Keith Reid; Derek Marloe (p) | |
| 1998 | Herne Hill | Bryan Steel; Paul Wingrave (p) | Russell Williams; Colin Denman (p) | Clive Burr; Derek Marloe (p) | |
| 1999 | Herne Hill | Simon Cope; Paul Wingrave (p) | Russell Williams; Colin Denman (p) | Rob Jefferies unknown | |
| 2000 | Reading | Simon Cope; Derek Marloe (p) | James Taylor; Colin Denman (p) | Dave Edwards; Roger Hughes (p) | |
| 2001 | Reading | Ray Hughes; Paul Wingrave (p) | Simon Cope; Derek Marloe (p) | James Taylor; Colin Denman (p) | |
| 2002 | Herne Hill | Russell Williams; Colin Denman (p) | Martin Freeman; Colin Garnham | Ray Hughes; Paul Wingrave (p) | |
| 2003 | Reading | Bryan Taylor; Colin Denman | Martin Freeman; Colin Garnham (p) | Andrew Russell; Derek Marloe | |
| 2004 | Herne Hill | Tom White; Steve White (p) | Simon Gaywood; Colin Garnham (p) | Tony Gibb; Graham Bristow (p) | |
| 2005 | Herne Hill | Bryan Taylor; Colin Denman (p) | James Holland-Leader; Colin Garnham (p) | Simon Gaywood; Derek Marloe (p) | |
| 2006 | Reading | Bryan Taylor; Colin Denman (p) | James Holland-Leader; Colin Garnham (p) | Simon Gaywood; Derek Marloe (p) | |
| 2007 | Maindy | Tony Gibb; Graham Bristow (p) | James McCallum; Derek Marloe (p) | Matthew Rowe; Courtney Rowe (p) | |
| 2008 | Maindy | Luke Rowe; Courtney Rowe (p) | Tony Gibb; Graham Bristow (p) | Andrew Magnier; Chris Pyatt (p) | |
| 2009 | Newport | Jon Mould; Courtney Rowe (p) | Jamie Rogers; Steve Parsons (p) | Tony Gibb; Tim Read (p) | |
| 2010 | Scunthorpe | Matthew Rowe; Courtney Rowe (p) | Matt Gittings; George Gilbert (p) | Adam Duggleby; Dave Urquhart (p) | |
| 2011 | Herne Hill | Jack Kirk; Peter Bäuerlein (p) | Adam Duggleby; Alex Wharton (p) | James Holland-Leader; Graham Bristow (p) | |
| 2012 | Herne Hill | Matt Gittings; George Gilbert (p) | Adam Duggleby; Alex Wharton (p) | Symon Lewis; Michael Lewis (p) | |
| 2013 | Newport | James Holland-Leader; Graham Bristow (p) | Symon Lewis; George Gilbert (p) | Phil Trodden; Dave Urquhart (p) | |
| 2014 | Herne Hill | Matt Gittings; George Gilbert (p) | James Holland-Leader; Graham Bristow (p) | Phil Trodden; Dave Urquhart (p) | |
| 2015 | Lee Valley | Oliver Moors; George Gilbert (p) | Alistair Rutherford; Pip Taylor (p) | Phil Trodden; Dave Urquhart (p) | |
| 2016 | Lee Valley | Oliver Moors; George Gilbert (p) | William Perrett; Tim Read (p) | Alistair Rutherford; Pip Taylor (p) | |
| 2017 | Lee Valley | Oliver Moors; George Gilbert (p) | William Perrett; James Holland-Leader (p) | Stephen Bradbury; Tim Read (p) | |
| 2018 | Newport | Oliver Moors; George Gilbert (p) | Stephen Bradbury; Tim Read (p) | Michael Mottram; Tony Hibbert (p) | |
| 2019 | Newport | Oliver Moors; George Gilbert (p) | Nicholas Cooper; Tim Read (p) | George Clark; Malcolm Freeman (p) | |
2020 Cancelled due to the COVID-19 pandemic
| 2021 | Newport | William Perrett; Pip Taylor (p) | Olivier Mangham; Iain Cook (p) | Oliver Moors; George Gilbert (p) | |
| 2022 | Newport | Tom Ward; Pip Taylor (p) | Nicholas Cooper; Brad Thurrell (p) | Max Capamagian; Tim Read (p) | |
| 2023 | Derby | Matthew Brennan; Paul Curran (p) | Tom Ward; Pip Taylor (p) | Matthew Gittings; George Gilbert (p) | |
| 2024 | Herne Hill | Alec Briggs; Iain Cook (p) | Tom Ward; John McClelland (p) | James Ambrose-Parish; Pip Taylor (p) | |
| 2025 | Lee Valley | William Perrett; Pip Taylor (p) | Dylan Belton Owen; Tony Cassidy (p) | Luke Meyer-Eland; Chris Bedson (p) | |
| 2026 | Welwyn | Frank Longstaff Tim Read (p) | Matthew Gittings Stephen Bradbury (p) | James Ambrose-Parish Tony Cassidy (p) | |

=== Women ===
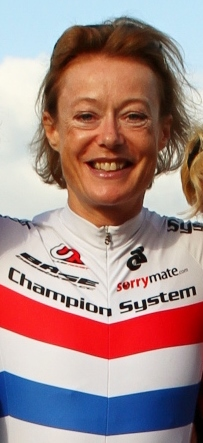
Janet Birkmyre, 2015 champion

| | Location | Gold | Silver | Bronze | Ref |
|---|---|---|---|---|---|
| 2005 | Herne Hill | Kate Cullen; Ian Smith (p) | Jo Tindley; Colin Denman (p) | Joy Nixon; Derek Marloe (p) | |
| 2006 | Reading | Victoria Pendleton; Sean Bannister (p) | Laura Bissell; Ian Smith (p) | Leda Cox; Paul Spender (p) | |
| 2007 | Maindy | Victoria Pendleton; Sean Bannister (p) | Alex Greenfield; Unknown | Katie Curtis; Unknown | |
| 2008 | Maindy | Janet Birkmyre; Graham Bristow (p) | Hannah Rich; James Taylor (p) | Joanne McRae; Colin Denman (p) | |
| 2009 | Newport | Danni King; Courtney Rowe (p) | Emma Patterson; George Gilbert (p) | Melanie Sneddon; Doug Pinkerton (p) | |
| 2010 | Scunthorpe | Laura Trott; Sean Bannister (p) | Danni King; Courtney Rowe (p) | Janet Birkmyre; Graham Bristow (p) | |
| 2011 | Herne Hill | Hannah Walker; Peter Bäuerlein (p) | Claire Newland; Dave Scott (p) | Corrine Hall; Derek Marloe (p) | |
| 2012 | Herne Hill | Hannah Walker; George Gilbert (p) | Corrine Hall; Derek Marloe (p) | Joanne McRae; Sean Bannister (p) | |
| 2013 | Newport | Katie Archibald; Ian Smith (p) | Janet Birkmyre; Graham Bristow (p) | Hannah Walker; George Gilbert (p) | |
| 2014 | Herne Hill | Hannah Walker; George Gilbert (p) | Niki Kovacs; Pip Taylor (p) | Janet Birkmyre; Graham Bristow (p) | |
| 2015 | Lee Valley | Janet Birkmyre; Graham Bristow (p) | Hannah Walker; George Gilbert (p) | Laura Cheesman; Tim Read (p) | |
| 2016 | Lee Valley | Neah Evans; Dave Urquhart (p) | Hannah Walker; George Gilbert (p) | Jennifer Allum; Tony Hibbert (p) | |
| 2017 | Lee Valley | Abigail Dentus; Dave Dentus (p) | Hannah Walker; George Gilbert (p) | Jennifer Allum; Tony Hibbert (p) | |
| 2018 | Newport | Ellie Russell; Iain Cook (p) | Abigail Dentus; Dave Dentus (p) | Niki Kovacs; James Holland-Leader (p) | |
| 2019 | Newport | Charlotte Parnham; Brad Thurrell (p) | Niki Kovacs; James Holland-Leader (p) | Catherine Coley; Phil Wright (p) | |
2020 Cancelled due to the COVID-19 pandemic
| 2021 | Newport | Anna Henderson; George Gilbert (p) | Mirriam Jessett; Tim Read (p) | Charlotte Parnham; Brad Thurrell (p) | |
| 2022 | Newport | Miriam Jessett; Tim Read (p) | Sophie Lewis; Thea Smith (p) | Charlotte Parnham; Pip Taylor (p) | |
| 2023 | Derby | Anna Morris; Pip Taylor (p) | Lucy Nelson; Phil Brown (p) | Miriam Jessett; Tim Read (p) | |
| 2024 | Herne Hill | Miriam Jessett; Tim Read (p) | Charlotte Parnham; Carl Alsop (p) | Hannah Williams; Tony Hibbert (p) | |
| 2025 | Lee Valley | Danielle Watkinson; James Holland-Leader (p) | Miriam Jessett; Pip Taylor (p) | Mathilde Pauls; Chris Bedson (p) | |
| 2026 | Welwyn | Jessica Disley Tony Cassidy (p) | Danielle Watkinson James Holland-Leader (p) | Miriam Jesset Tim Read (p) | |

Key

- (p) = pacer
