= 2023 British Cycling National Track Championships =

British cycling event

- Venue: Newport, Wales
- Date: 26–29 January 2023
- Velodrome: Geraint Thomas National Velodrome

The 2023 British Cycling National Track Championships were a series of track cycling competitions. The National Track Championships (excluding certain events) were held from 26 to 29 January 2023 at the Geraint Thomas National Velodrome in Newport, Wales. They are organised and sanctioned by British Cycling, and are open to British cyclists.

Emma Finucane was the star of the Championships after winning four gold medals across the disciplines.

The Derny, Omnium, Madison, Tandem and Elimination events take place at various other dates throughout the year.

== Medal summary ==
=== Men ===
Event	Gold	Silver	Bronze
1 km Time trial	Joe Holt	Calum Moir	Tom Ward
Sprint	Harry Ledingham-Horn	Jack Carlin	Matt Rotherham
Keirin	Hamish Turnbull	Jack Carlin	Niall Monks
Team sprint	Team Inspired; Marcus Hiley; Harry Ledingham-Horn; Ed Lowe	North West; Oliver Aloul; James Bunting; Hayden Norris; Matt Rotherham	Glasgow Track RC; Luthais Arthur; Niall Monks; Lyall Craig
Individual Pursuit	Charlie Tanfield	Michael Gill	William Roberts
Team pursuit	Saint Piran; Josh Charlton; Charlie Tanfield; William Tidball; William Roberts	East Midlands; Michael Gill; Sebastian Garry; William Perrett; Tom Ward	Fensham Howes - MAS Design; Alex Beldon; Matthew Brennan; Jed Smithson; Ben Wiggins
Points	William Perrett	William Tidball	Josh Charlton
Scratch	Joe Holt	Matthew Brennan	Jack Rootkin-Gray

=== Women ===
Event	Gold	Silver	Bronze
500m time trial	Emma Finucane	Sophie Capewell	Lauren Bell
Sprint	Emma Finucane	Sophie Capewell	Lauren Bell
Keirin	Emma Finucane	Katy Marchant	Sophie Capewell
Team sprint	Team Inspired B Katy Marchant; Emma Finucane; Milly Tanner	Team Inspired A Sophie Capewell; Blaine Ridge-Davis; Lowri Thomas	Scotland; Lauren Bell; Iona Moir; Ellie Stone
Individual Pursuit	Neah Evans	Ella Barnwell	Francesca Hall
Team pursuit	Team Inspired; Ella Barnwell; Madelaine Leech; Grace Lister; Jessica Roberts	Alba Development; Sophie Lankford; Beth Maciver; Eilidh Shaw; Evie White	Tofauti Everyone Active; Mari Porton; Lowri Richards; Esther Wong; Laura Davies
Points	Neah Evans	Madelaine Leech	Sophie Lewis
Scratch	Jessica Roberts	Neah Evans	Grace Lister

== Other events ==
=== Men ===
Event	Venue & date	Gold	Silver	Bronze
Derny	Derby, 23 Sep	Matthew Brennan	Tom Ward	Matthew Gittings
Elimination Race	Newport, 4 June	Matt Rotherham	Tom Ward	David Brearley
Madison	Derby, 22 Sep	Cancelled due to lack of entries		
Omnium	Herne Hill, London, 27 Aug	Rhys Britton	William Perrett	Jacob Vaughan

=== Women ===
Event	Venue & date	Gold	Silver	Bronze
Derny	Derby, 23 Sep	Anna Morris	Lucy Nelson	Miriam Jessett
Madison	Derby, 22 Sep	Cancelled due to lack of entries		
Omnium	Herne Hill, London, 27 Aug	Grace Lister	Dannielle Khan	Lucy Nelson

=== Open ===
Event	Venue & date	Gold	Silver	Bronze
Tandem	Newport, 4 June	Matt Rotherham; Sophie Unwin	Joshua Dunham; Thomas Wing	Peter Boyd; Megan Boyd
