= Sport in Reading, Berkshire =

Reading is home to a number of professional sports teams and various amateur sports clubs.

== Football ==
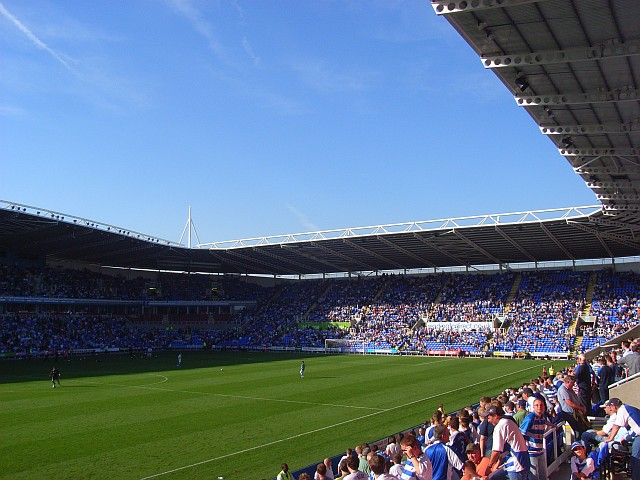
The Madejski Stadium, home of Reading Football Club and formerly London Irish

Reading is the home of Reading Football Club, an association football club nicknamed The Royals, formed in 1871. Formerly based at Elm Park, the club plays at the 24,161 capacity Madejski Stadium, named after chairman Sir John Madejski. After winning the 2005–06 Football League Championship with a record of 106 points, Reading F.C. spent two seasons in the Premier League before being relegated to The Championship. During their Premier League first season, they fractionally missed-out on UEFA Cup qualification.

Reading Town Football Club, formed in 1966, played at Scours Lane and were playing in the Hellenic League Premier Division prior to folding in June 2016. Reading City Football Club (Formerly Highmoor Ibis) have since moved back to Scours Lane having formerly played there up to 2011 which was renamed Rivermoor Stadium in 2016 upon the clubs return and currently play in the Hellenic League Premier Division.

== Rugby ==
Reading was a centre for rugby union football in the area, with the Aviva Premiership team London Irish as tenants at the Madejski Stadium until they moved back to London into the Brentford Community Stadium at the start of the 2020-21 Premiership Season. Reading is home to three senior semi-professional rugby clubs; Reading Abbey R.F.C., Redingensians R.F.C. and Reading R.F.C.

== Palmer Park Stadium ==
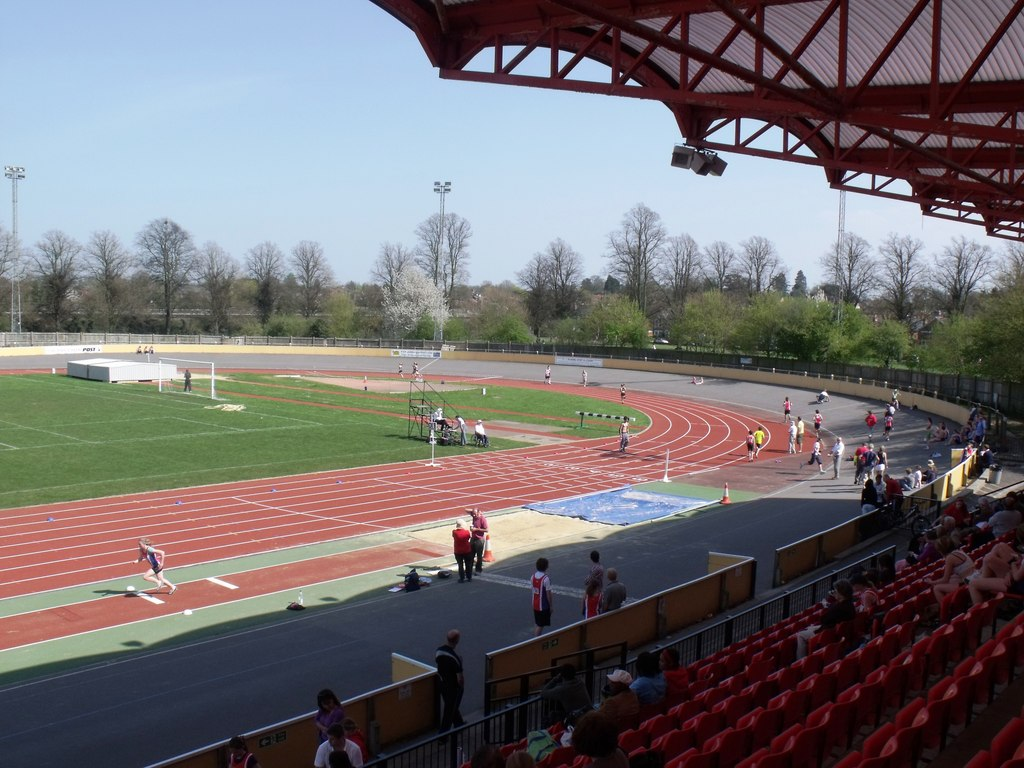
Palmer Park Stadium

Palmer Park Stadium within Palmer Park has a velodrome and athletics track. It is used by Palmer Park Velo, Reading Athletic Club and the Berkshire Renegades for training.

== Basketball ==
The Reading Rockets basketball club plays in the English Basketball League.

== Hockey ==
Reading Hockey Club enter teams in both the Men's and Women's England Hockey Leagues.

== Rowing ==
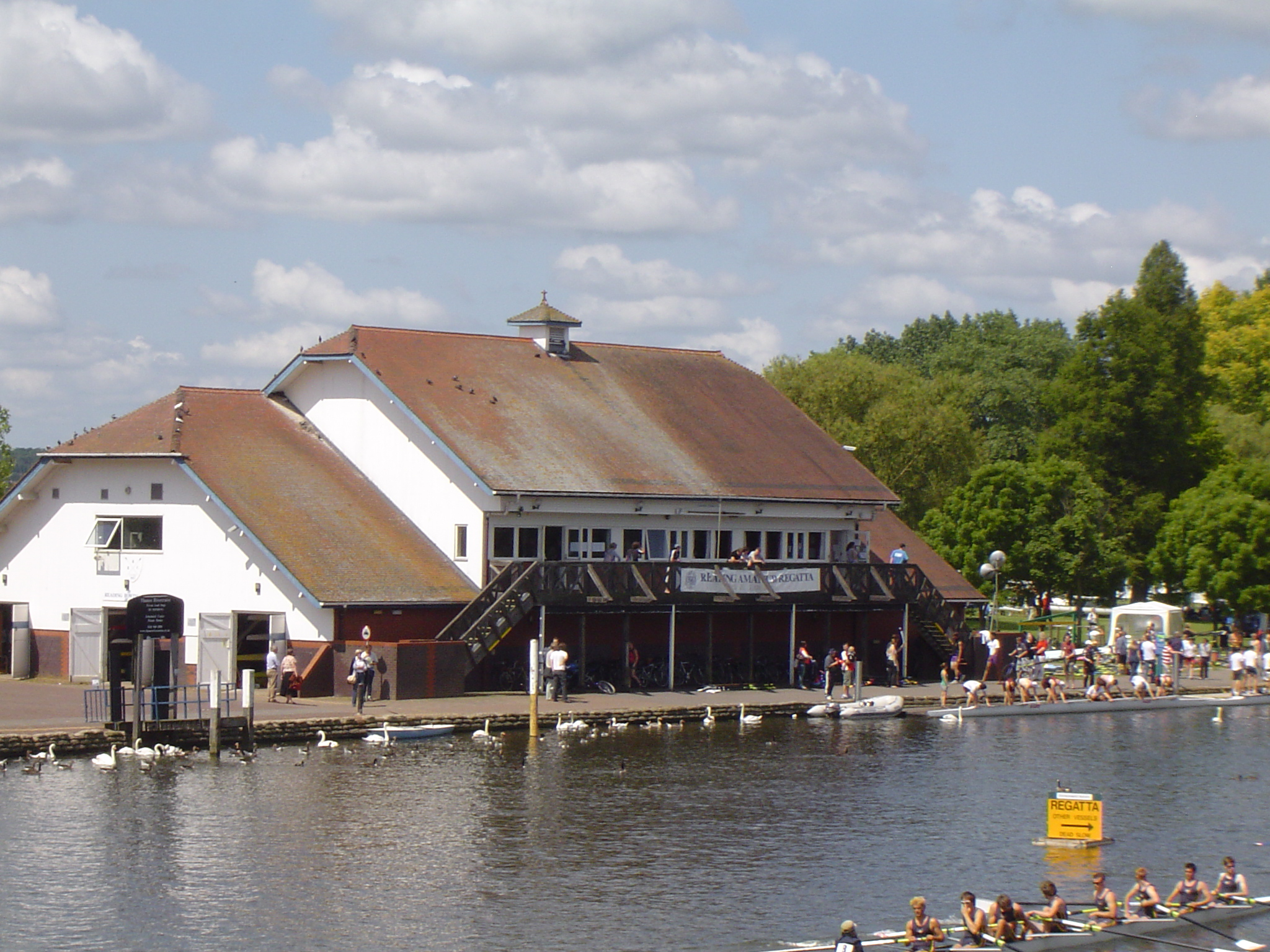
Reading Rowing Club on the River Thames

Rowing is pursued by the Reading Rowing Club, the Reading University Boat Club, both next to Caversham Bridge whilst Reading Blue Coat School trains in Sonning adjacent to The Redgrave Pinsent Rowing Lake in Caversham, which provides training facilities for the GB National Squad. However almost all club rowing is done on the River Thames. The annual Reading Town Regatta takes place near Thames Valley Park, with the Reading Amateur Regatta taking place in June, usually two weeks prior to Henley Royal Regatta.

== Speedway ==
The town was home to a motorcycle speedway team, Reading Racers. Speedway came to Reading in 1968 at Tilehurst Stadium, until the team moved to Smallmead Stadium in Whitley, which was demolished at the end of 2008. The team was inactive pending the building of a new stadium, which it was hoped to complete in 2012. The team reformed in 2016 joining the newly formed Southern Developmental League the following year. The team currently races in Swindon awaiting a new stadium in Reading to be built to return to the town in.

== Marathon ==
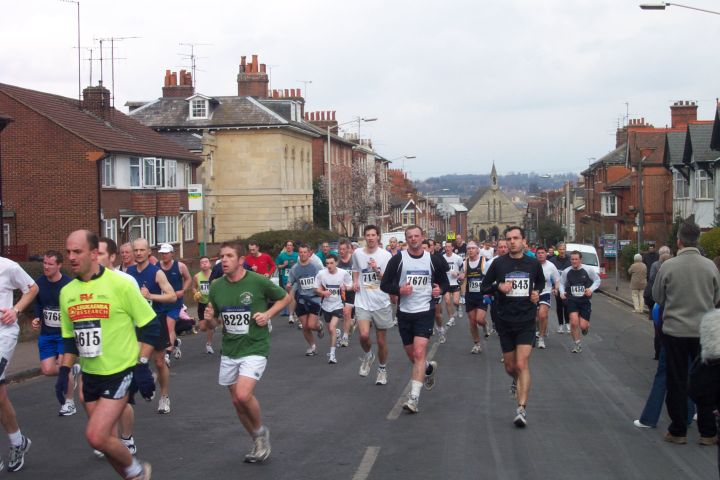
The Reading Half Marathon 2004 climbing Russell Street in West Reading

The Reading Half Marathon is held on the streets of Reading in March of each year, with 16,000 competitors from elite to fun runners. It was first run in 1983 and took place in every subsequent year except 2001, when it was cancelled because of concerns over that year's outbreak of foot-and-mouth disease.

== Tennis ==
The Berkshire Championships were founded in Reading from 1903, through till 1970 except for the years 1936 to 1938 when they were held in Wallingford and Cookham in 1971 when the tournament ended.

== Triathlon ==
The British Triathlon Association was formed at the town's former Mall health club on 11 December 1982. Britain's first-ever triathlon took place just outside Reading at Kirtons's Farm in Pingewood in 1983 and was revived in 1994 and 95. Thames Valley Triathletes, based in the town, is Britain's oldest triathlon club, having its origins in the 1984 event at nearby Heckfield, when a relay team raced under the name Reading Triathlon Club.

== Other sports ==
The Hexagon theatre was home to snooker's Grand Prix tournament, one of the sport's "Big Four", from 1984 to 1994.

The town hosts Australian rules football team Reading Kangaroos and American football team Berkshire Renegades.

Reading-born Richard Burns became the first Englishman to win the World Rally Championship, in 2001.

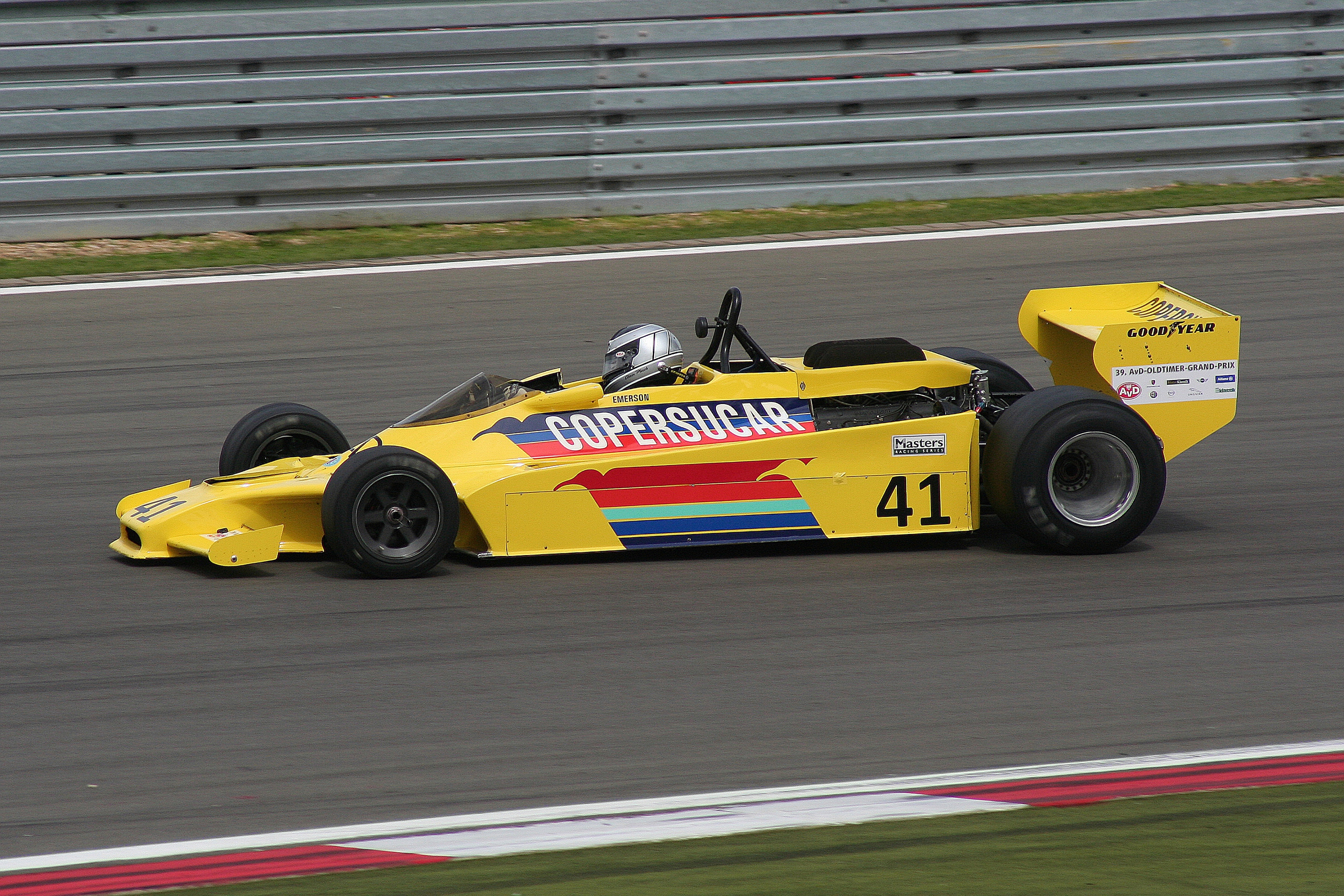
A Fittipaldi F5 being driven at the Nürburgring

Reading has previously been the town in which two former Formula One teams, Canadian constructor Walter Wolf Racing (from 1977 to 1979) and Brazilian constructor Fittipaldi Automotive (from 1977 to 1982), based their headquarters. Former Formula One driver Innes Ireland (who is best known for racing for Team Lotus from 1959 to 1961, as well as driving for British Racing Partnership and BRM between 1962 and 1966), lived in Reading until he succumbed to cancer at the age of 63 in 1993. Three-time Formula One champion Ayrton Senna lived in Tilehurst in the 1980s; a road is named after him.

Reading Rooks Korfball Club practices at Reading Blue Coat School and (as of season 2025-26) has 4 teams participating at various levels in the English Korfball League.
