= 2022 British National Track Championships =

- Venue: Newport, Wales
- Date(s): 3–6 March 2022
- Velodrome: Geraint Thomas National Velodrome

The 2022 British National Track Championships were a series of track cycling competitions. The National Track Championships (excluding certain events) were due to be held from 28 to 30 January 2022 at the Geraint Thomas National Velodrome in Newport, Wales. However, following further issues regarding the COVID-19 pandemic the event was rescheduled for 3 March to 6 March.

They are organised and sanctioned by British Cycling, and are open to British cyclists. The championships are sponsored by HSBC.

The Derny, Omnium, Madison, Tandem and inaugural Elimination events took place at various other dates throughout the year.

== Medal summary ==
=== Men ===
Event	Gold	Silver	Bronze
1 km Time trial	Matt Rotherham	Jonathan Wale	Harvey McNaughton
Sprint	Jack Carlin	Joseph Truman	Hamish Turnbull
Keirin	Jack Carlin	Joseph Truman	Hamish Turnbull
Team sprint	Team Inspired; Jack Carlin; Ali Fielding; Joseph Truman; Hamish Turnbull	Team East Midlands; James Bunting; Marcus Hiley; Harry Ledingham-Horn; Hayden Norris	Glasgow Track RC; Luthais Arthur; Niall Monks; Anthony Young
Individual Pursuit	Daniel Bigham	Charlie Tanfield	Kyle Gordon
Team pursuit	Team Wales; Rhys Britton; Joe Holt; Harvey McNaughton; William Roberts; Joshua Tarling	Team East Midlands; Jack Brough; Kyle Gordon; William Perrett; Tom Ward	Fensham Howes - MAS Design; Alex Beldon; Matthew Brennan; Jed Smithson; Ben Wiggins
Points	Joshua Tarling	Oscar Nilsson-Julien	John Archibald
Scratch	William Tidball	Oscar Nilsson-Julien	Joshua Giddings

=== Women ===
Event	Gold	Silver	Bronze
500m time trial	Ellie Stone	Lauren Bell	Emma Finucane
Sprint	Rhian Edmunds	Sophie Capewell	Emma Finucane
Keirin	Ellie Stone	Emma Finucane	Sophie Capewell
Team sprint	Team Wales; Rhian Edmunds; Emma Finucane; Lowri Thomas	Team Breeze; Sophie Capewell; Blaine Ridge-Davis; Milly Tanner	Team Scotland; Lauren Bell; Iona Moir; Lusia Steele; Ellie Stone
Individual Pursuit	Neah Evans	Anna Morris	Kate Richardson
Team pursuit	Brother UK-Orientation Marketing; Ellen Bennett; Grace Lister; Holly Ramsey; Izzy Sharp	Liv Cycling Club; Katie-Anne Calton; Ella Jamieson; Matilda McKibben; Awen Roberts	Not awarded
Points	Neah Evans	Jenny Holl	Anna Morris
Scratch	Ella Barnwell	Anna Morris	Neah Evans

== Other events ==
=== Men ===
Event	Venue & date	Gold	Silver	Bronze
Derny	Newport, 24 Sep	Tom Ward	Nicholas Cooper	Max Capamagian
Elimination	Newport, 5 June	Josh Charlton	William Roberts	Andrew Brinkley
Madison	Derby, 1 April	William Perrett; Mark Stewart	Jack Brough; Oscar Nilsson-Julien	Jack Rootkin Gray; Robert Donaldson
Omnium	Derby, 2 April	Oscar Nilsson-Julien	Mark Stewart	William Tidball

=== Women ===
Event	Venue & date	Gold	Silver	Bronze
Derny	Newport, 24 Sep	Miriam Jessett	Sophie Lewis	Charlotte Parnham
Madison	Derby, 1 April	Laura Kenny; Neah Evans	Sophie Lewis; Maddie Leech	Ella Barnwell; Jessica Roberts
Omnium	Derby, 2 April	Sophie Lewis	Neah Evans	Maddie Leech

=== Open ===
Event	Venue & date	Gold	Silver	Bronze
Tandem	Newport, 5 Jun	Steffan Lloyd; Alex Pope	Peter Boyd; Megan Boyd	Amy Cole; Nia Holt
