= Janet Birkmyre =

English racing cyclist

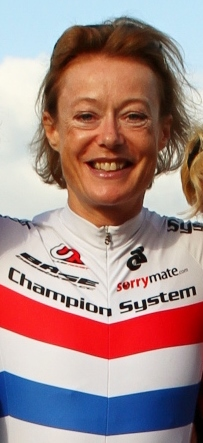
- Birkmyre in 2013

Personal information
- Full name: Janet Susan Birkmyre
- Born: 10 August 1966 (age 60) England

Cycling career
- Sport: Cycling
- Discipline: Track
- Role: Rider

Professional teams
- 2005: Twickenham CC/Natures Kiss
- 2006–2007: Planet X
- 2008–2009: XRT – www.elmycycles.co.uk
- 2010–2011: Orbea-For Goodness Shakes
- 2012: TORQ Performance (current)

Major wins
- Multiple World Masters Champion x56 (United Kingdom) Multiple British Elite National Champion x3 (United Kingdom) Multiple British Elite National Series Champion x8 (Europe) Multiple European Masters Champion x28 (United Kingdom) Multiple British Masters Champion x83

Janet Susan Birkmyre (born 10 August 1966 in the Worcester area) is an English track racing cyclist. She took up cycling in 2003 and raced for the first time in 2004. Since then she has been an elite British National Champion three times, winning the National Scratch race in 2012 as well as the National Derny Championships in 2015 and 2008, she has also won the National Omnium Series eight times. In addition, she has taken 56 World Masters Championship titles, plus 28 European Masters titles and 83 National Masters titles.

Janet has set a number of World Masters Records. Most recently, in 2026 she set a new record for the 500n TT (60-64), she also holds the record for the 500m TT (50-54) with a time of 37.026. She was part of the World Masters Team Pursuit team that set a new World Masters record in 2014 and 2015, in October 2012 she set a new world record for the 500m TT (45–49 category) with a time of 37.419. The previous year she set a new world record for the 200m TT (45–49 category) with a time of 12.229, bettering the previous record which had stood since 2002, she also set a new record for the 500m TT (45–49 category) with a time of 37.429. Previous to this, in October 2006, she broke the World Masters Record (40–49 category) in the 500m TT in Manchester, with a time of 37.239, she also holds a number of European Masters Records. Birkmyre broke the National Tandem Record for 5 km on 16 May 2006 in a new time of 6:45:848. Janet also currently holds nine National Masters track records. British cycling

Janet was featured in the Telegraph Weekend "Over 40 and fitter than ever: a grown up guide"

Janet's father is Nicholas John Birkmyre a former rower who represented Great Britain with George Justicz in double sculls.

== Palmarès ==
2026
1st Points Race, UCI World Masters Track Championships
1st Individual Pursuit, UCI World Masters Track Championships
1st 500m Time Trial, UCI World Masters Track Championships
1st Scratch Race, UCI World Masters Track Championships
1st Sprint, UCI World Masters Track Championships
1st (United Kingdom) Individual Pursuit, British National Masters Track Championships
1st (United Kingdom) Elimination Race, British National Masters Track Championships
1st (United Kingdom) Points Race, British National Masters Track Championships
1st (United Kingdom) 500m TT, British National Masters Track Championships
1st (United Kingdom) Scratch Race, British National Masters Track Championships
1st (United Kingdom) Sprint, British National Masters Track Championships
1st BMCR Road Race Championships
1st BMCR Criterium Championships

2025
1st Team Pursuit, UCI World Masters Track Championships
1st Team Sprint, UCI World Masters Track Championships
2nd Scratch, UCI World Masters Track Championships
2nd Points, UCI World Masters Track Championships
2nd Individual Pursuit, UCI World Masters Track Championships
2nd 500m TT, UCI World Masters Track Championships
1st (United Kingdom) 500m TT, British National Masters Track Championships
1st (United Kingdom) Points, British National Masters Track Championships
1st (United Kingdom) Individual Pursuit, British National Masters Track Championships
1st (United Kingdom) Scratch, British National Masters Track Championships
1st (United Kingdom) Criterium Championships, British Cycling Masters
1st BMCR Track Championships Points Race and Scratch Race

2024
1st Scratch, UCI World Masters Track Championships
1st Points, UCI World Masters Track Championships
1st Individual Pursuit, UCI World Masters Track Championships
1st Team Pursuit, UCI World Masters Track Championships
1st Team Sprint, UCI World Masters Track Championships
2nd 500m TT, UCI World Masters Track Championships
1st (United Kingdom) 500m TT, British National Masters Track Championships
1st (United Kingdom) Points, British National Masters Track Championships
1st (United Kingdom) Individual Pursuit, British National Masters Track Championships
1st (United Kingdom) Scratch, British National Masters Track Championships
1st BMCR Track Championships Criterium Championships

2023
1st Scratch, UCI World Masters Track Championships
1st Points, UCI World Masters Track Championships
1st 500m TT, UCI World Masters Track Championships
1st Individual Pursuit, UCI World Masters Track Championships
1st Team Pursuit, UCI World Masters Track Championships
1st Team Sprint, UCI World Masters Track Championships
1st (United Kingdom) 500m TT, British National Masters Track Championships
1st (United Kingdom) Points, British National Masters Track Championships
1st (United Kingdom) Scratch, British National Masters Track Championships
1st BMCR Criterium Championships
1st BMCR Road Race Championships

2022
1st (United Kingdom) 500m TT, British National Masters Track Championships
1st (United Kingdom) Points, British National Masters Track Championships
1st (United Kingdom) Scratch, British National Masters Track Championships
1st BMCR Track Championship x5: keirin, scratch, points, IP, 500m
1st BMCR Criterium Championships
1st BMCR Road Race Championships
1st BMCR Mountain Bike Championships

2021
1st (United Kingdom) Points, British National Masters Track Championships
1st (United Kingdom) Scratch, British National Masters Track Championships
1st BMCR Track Championship x4: scratch, points, IP, 500m
1st BMCR Criterium Championships

2020
1st BMCR Track Omnium Championships

2019
1st Team Pursuit, UCI World Masters Track Championships
2nd Scratch, UCI World Masters Track Championships
2nd Points, UCI World Masters Track Championships
2nd 500m TT, UCI World Masters Track Championships
2nd Team Sprint, UCI World Masters Track Championships
2nd Individual Pursuit, UCI World Masters Track Championships
1st (United Kingdom) 500m TT, British National Masters Track Championships (new World Masters Record)
1st (United Kingdom) Points, British National Masters Track Championships
1st (United Kingdom) Pursuit, British National Masters Track Championships
1st (United Kingdom) Scratch, British National Masters Track Championships

2018
1st (United Kingdom) 500m TT, British National Masters Track Championships
1st (United Kingdom) Points, British National Masters Track Championships
1st (United Kingdom) Pursuit, British National Masters Track Championships
1st (United Kingdom) Scratch, British National Masters Track Championships
1st LVRC Omnium Championship
1st LVRC Track Champion winning points, scratch and IP

2017
1st (Europe) 500 TT, European Masters Track Championships
1st (Europe) Pursuit, European Masters Track Championships
1st (Europe) Points, European Masters Track Championships
1st (Europe) Sprint, European Masters Track Championships
1st (Europe) Scratch, European Masters Track Championships
1st (Europe) Team Pursuit, European Masters Track Championships
1st (Europe) Team Sprint, European Masters Track Championships
3rd National Team Time Trial Championships
1st (United Kingdom) 500m TT, British National Masters Track Championships
1st (United Kingdom) Points, British National Masters Track Championships
1st (United Kingdom) Pursuit, British National Masters Track Championships
1st (United Kingdom) Scratch, British National Masters Track Championships

2016
1st Scratch, UCI World Masters Track Championships
1st Points, UCI World Masters Track Championships
1st 500m TT, UCI World Masters Track Championships
1st Team Pursuit, UCI World Masters Track Championships
1st Team Sprint, UCI World Masters Track Championships
2nd Individual Pursuit, UCI World Masters Track Championships
1st (United Kingdom) 500m TT, British National Masters Track Championships
1st (United Kingdom) Points, British National Masters Track Championships
1st (United Kingdom) Pursuit, British National Masters Track Championships
1st (United Kingdom) Scratch, British National Masters Track Championships
2nd National Team Time Trial Championships

2015
1st (United Kingdom) British National Derny Championships
1st Individual Pursuit, UCI World Masters Track Championships
1st Scratch, UCI World Masters Track Championships
1st Points, UCI World Masters Track Championships
1st 500m TT, UCI World Masters Track Championships
1st Team Pursuit, UCI World Masters Track Championships
2nd Team Sprint, UCI World Masters Track Championships
1st (United Kingdom) 500m TT, British National Masters Track Championships
1st (United Kingdom) Points, British National Masters Track Championships
1st (United Kingdom) Pursuit, British National Masters Track Championships
1st (United Kingdom) Scratch, British National Masters Track Championships
1st (United Kingdom) Overall National Women's Omnium Series Champion

2014
1st Pursuit, UCI World Masters Track Championships
1st Scratch, UCI World Masters Track Championships
1st Points, UCI World Masters Track Championships
1st Team Sprint, UCI World Masters Track Championships
1st Team Pursuit, UCI World Masters Track Championships
2nd 500m TT, UCI World Masters Track Championships
1st (United Kingdom) Sprint, British National Masters Track Championships
1st (United Kingdom) TT, British National Masters Track Championships
1st (United Kingdom) Points, British National Masters Track Championships
1st (United Kingdom) Pursuit, British National Masters Track Championships
1st (United Kingdom) Scratch, British National Masters Track Championships
3rd British National Derny Championships

2013
1st Pursuit, UCI World Masters Track Championships
1st Scratch, UCI World Masters Track Championships
1st Points, UCI World Masters Track Championships
1st Team Sprint, UCI World Masters Track Championships
1st Team Pursuit, UCI World Masters Track Championships
1st (United Kingdom) Sprint, British National Masters Track Championships
1st (United Kingdom) 500 TT, British National Masters Track Championships
1st (United Kingdom) Points, British National Masters Track Championships
1st (United Kingdom) Pursuit, British National Masters Track Championships
1st (United Kingdom) Scratch, British National Masters Track Championships
1st (Europe) 500 TT, European Masters Track Championships
1st (Europe) Pursuit, European Masters Track Championships
1st (Europe) Points, European Masters Track Championships
1st (Europe) Sprint, European Masters Track Championships
1st (Europe) Scratch, European Masters Track Championships
1st (United Kingdom) Overall National Women's Omnium Series Champion
2nd British National Derny Championships

2012
1st (United Kingdom) Scratch race, British National Track Championships
1st Pursuit, UCI World Masters Track Championships
1st 500m TT, UCI World Masters Track Championships
1st Sprint, UCI World Masters Track Championships
1st Scratch, UCI World Masters Track Championships
1st Team Sprint, UCI World Masters Track Championships
2nd Points, UCI World Masters Track Championships
1st (United Kingdom) Sprint, British National Masters Track Championships
3rd 500m TT, British National Masters Track Championships
1st (United Kingdom) Points, British National Masters Track Championships
1st (United Kingdom) Pursuit, British National Masters Track Championships
1st (United Kingdom) Scratch, British National Masters Track Championships

2011
3rd British National Team Sprint Championships
1st Points race, UCI World Masters Track Championships
1st 500m TT, UCI World Masters Track Championships
1st Sprint, UCI World Masters Track Championships
1st Scratch, UCI World Masters Track Championships
1st Team Sprint, UCI World Masters Track Championships
3rd Pursuit, UCI World Masters Track Championships
1st (Europe) 500 TT, European Masters Track Championships
1st (Europe) Pursuit, European Masters Track Championships
1st (Europe) Points, European Masters Track Championships
1st (Europe) Sprint, European Masters Track Championships
1st (Europe) Scratch, European Masters Track Championships
1st (United Kingdom) Overall National Women's Omnium Series Champion
1st (United Kingdom) Sprint, British National Masters Track Championships
1st (United Kingdom) TT, British National Masters Track Championships
1st (United Kingdom) Points, British National Masters Track Championships
2nd Pursuit, British National Masters Track Championships
3rd Scratch, British National Masters Track Championships

2010
2nd British National Team Pursuit Championships
3rd British National Derny Championships
1st Points race, UCI World Masters Track Championships
1st 500m TT, UCI World Masters Track Championships
1st Sprint, UCI World Masters Track Championships
1st Scratch, UCI World Masters Track Championships
1st Pursuit, UCI World Masters Track Championships
1st (Europe) 500 TT, European Masters Track Championships
1st (Europe) Pursuit, European Masters Track Championships
1st (Europe) Points, European Masters Track Championships
1st (Europe) Sprint, European Masters Track Championships
1st (United Kingdom) Sprint, British National Masters Track Championships
1st (United Kingdom) Scratch, British National Masters Track Championships
1st (United Kingdom) Pursuit, British National Masters Track Championships
1st (United Kingdom) Points, British National Masters Track Championships
2nd 500m TT, British National Masters Track Championships

2009
3rd British National Team Sprint Championships
1st (Europe) 500 TT, European Masters Track Championships
1st (Europe) Pursuit, European Masters Track Championships
1st (Europe) Points, European Masters Track Championships
1st (Europe) Sprint, European Masters Track Championships
1st (United Kingdom) Overall National Women's Omnium Series Champion
1st (United Kingdom) 500 TT, British National Masters Track Championships
1st (United Kingdom) Scratch, British National Masters Track Championships
2nd Sprint, British National Masters Track Championships
2nd Pursuit, British National Masters Track Championships
3rd Points, British National Masters Track Championships

2008
1st (United Kingdom) British National Derny Championships
1st (Europe) 500 TT, European Masters Track Championships
1st (Europe) Pursuit, European Masters Track Championships
1st (Europe) Points, European Masters Track Championships
1st (Europe) Sprint, European Masters Track Championships
1st (United Kingdom) Overall National Women's Omnium Series Champion
1st (United Kingdom) 500 TT, British National Masters Track Championships
1st (United Kingdom) Scratch, British National Masters Track Championships
1st (United Kingdom) Pursuit, British National Masters Track Championships
1st (United Kingdom) Points, British National Masters Track Championships
1st (United Kingdom) Sprint, British National Masters Track Championships

2007
2nd Scratch race, British National Track Championships
4th 500m TT, British National Track Championships
5th Keirin British National Track Championships
6th British National Derny Championships
1st (United Kingdom) Overall National Women's Omnium Series Champion
2nd Road Race UCI World Masters Championships, Austria
1st Tour of Britain Support Race, Women's Grand Prix, Crystal Palace
1st Tour de France Support Race, Hyde Park
1st (United Kingdom) 500 TT, British National Masters Track Championships
1st (United Kingdom) Scratch, British National Masters Track Championships
1st (United Kingdom) Pursuit, British National Masters Track Championships
1st (United Kingdom) Points, British National Masters Track Championships
1st (United Kingdom) Sprint, British National Masters Track Championships

2006
1st Points race, UCI World Masters Track Championships
1st 500m TT, UCI World Masters Track Championships
1st Sprint, UCI World Masters Track Championships
2nd Pursuit, UCI World Masters Track Championships
Elite National Championships
6th British National Derny Championships
4th British National Circuit Race Championships
3rd 500m TT, British National Track Championships
6th Scratch Race, British National Track Championships
6th Keirin British National Track Championships
1st (United Kingdom) Overall National Women's Omnium Series Champion
1st (United Kingdom) 500 TT, British National Masters Track Championships
1st (United Kingdom) Scratch, British National Masters Track Championships
1st (United Kingdom) Pursuit, British National Masters Track Championships
1st (United Kingdom) Points, British National Masters Track Championships
3rd Sprint, British National Masters Track Championships
2nd Essex Giro, National Women's Road Race Series

2005
1st 500m TT, UCI World Masters Track Championships
1st Pursuit, UCI World Masters Track Championships
2nd Sprint, UCI World Masters Track Championships
Elite National Championships
3rd 500m TT, British National Track Championships
3rd Sprint, British National Track Championships
1st (United Kingdom) Overall National Women's Omnium Series Champion
1st (United Kingdom) 500 TT, British National Masters Track Championships
1st (United Kingdom) Scratch, British National Masters Track Championships
1st (United Kingdom) Points, British National Masters Track Championships
1st (United Kingdom) Sprint, British National Masters Track Championships
2nd Pursuit, British National Masters Track Championships
