= Anthony Stirrat =

British cyclist

Personal information
- Full name: Anthony Alexander Stirrat
- Born: 30 June 1970 (age 56) Irvine, North Ayrshire, Scotland
- Height: 167 cm (5 ft 6 in)
- Weight: 73 kg (161 lb)

Cycling career
- Sport: Cycling

Amateur team
- 1991-2006: City of Edinburgh Racing Club

Anthony Alexander Stirrat (born 30 June 1970) is a male Scottish former international cyclist. He competed in the track time trial at the 1992 Summer Olympics.

Stirrat is a multiple British National champion, winning the track time trial title once, the Scratch title twice and the team sprint title once. He also represented Scotland in three track events at the 1998 Commonwealth Games in Kuala Lumpur, Malaysia.

== Palmarès ==
1991
2nd Time Trial, 1991 British National Track Championships

1992
1st Time Trial, 1992 British National Track Championships
1st Scratch, 1992 British National Track Championships

1993
1st Team Sprint, 1993 British National Track Championships
2nd Time Trial, 1993 British National Track Championships
2nd Omnium, 1993 British National Track Championships

1994
1st Scratch, 1994 British National Track Championships
3rd Points, 1994 British National Track Championships

1995
2nd Scratch, 1995 British National Track Championships
2nd Omnium, 1995 British National Track Championships
3rd Points, 1995 British National Track Championships
3rd Time Trial, 1995 British National Track Championships

2005
3rd Omnium, 2005 British National Track Championships

2006
3rd Omnium, 2006 British National Track Championships

== See also ==
- City of Edinburgh Racing Club
- Achievements of members of City of Edinburgh Racing Club
