= Ella Barnwell =

British and Welsh cyclist

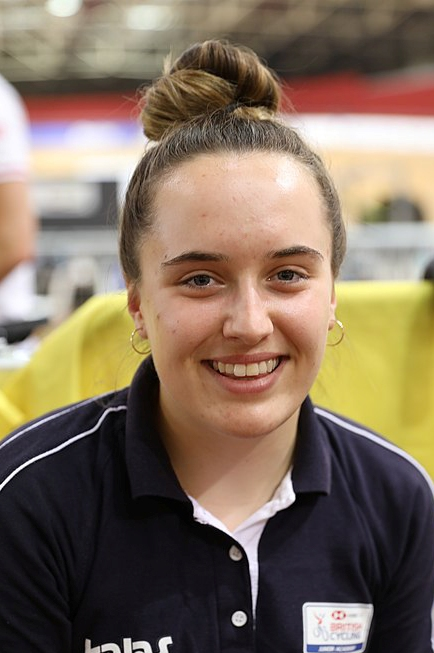

Personal information
- Born: 14 January 2001 (age 25) Wales

Cycling career
- Sport: Cycling
- Current team: Liv Cycling Club / Team Breeze
- Discipline: Track cycling
- Role: Rider
- Rider type: Pursuit, Scratch, Omnium

Ella Barnwell (born 14 January 2001) is a British and Welsh female track and road cyclist.

== Cycling career ==
=== Track ===
Barnwell is a multiple British champion after winning the Scratch Championship and the Team Pursuit Championship at the 2020 British National Track Championships. She had previously won the Omnium title. At the 2022 British National Track Championships in Newport, Wales she won another British title after winning the scratch event.

Barnwell won her fifth national title at the 2023 British Cycling National Track Championships, she won the team pursuit for the second time.

=== Road ===
In 2021 she won the Halesowen Athletic & Cycling Club women's road race.
