= Oliver Moors =

British cyclist

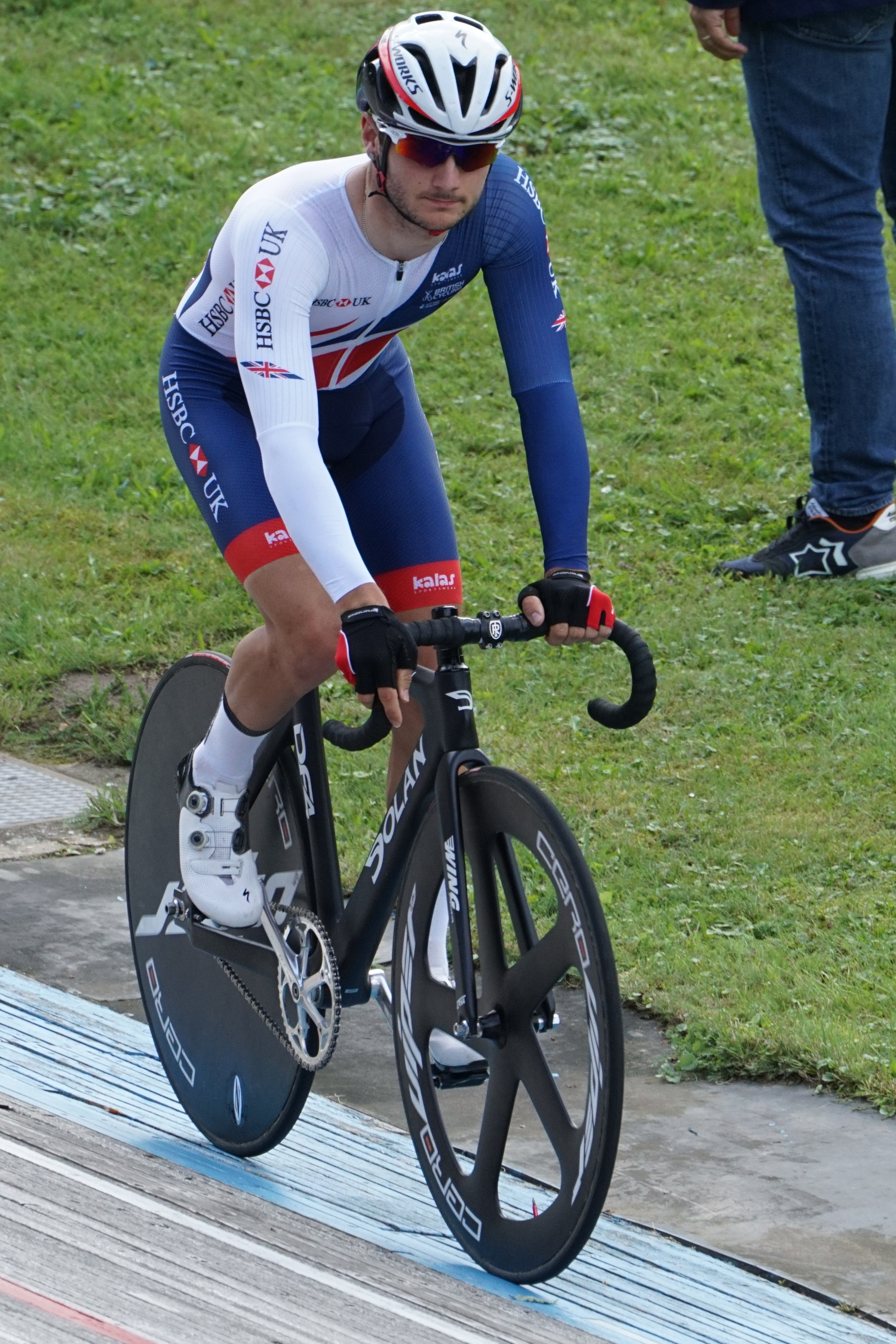
- Moors in 2017

Personal information
- Full name: Oliver Henry Moors
- Born: 24 September 1996 (age 30)
- Height: 1.70 m (5 ft 7 in)
- Weight: 63 kg (139 lb)

Cycling career
- Sport: Cycling
- Current team: Volkerwessels Cycling Team
- Disciplines: Road; Track
- Role: Performance Coach

Amateur teams
- 2014–2015: Project 51
- 2017–2018: Baguet–MIBA Poorten–Indulek
- 2019: VDM–Trawobo
- 2021: Indulek–Doltcini–Derito CT
- 2022: Borgonjon–Dewasport

Professional teams
- 2016: Astellas
- 2020–2021: Ribble Weldtite

Oliver Henry Moors (born 24 September 1996) is a British road and track cyclist. He has won five national titles in his specialist discipline and has represented Great Britain at the 2016 and 2017 UEC European Derny Championships. Moors also previously rode for the professional American UCI Continental team, Astellas in 2016.

== Major results ==
2015
National Track Championships

1st Derny
9th Scratch

2016
1st Derny, National Track Championships
2nd UIV U23 Cup, Gent
6th Derny, UEC European Track Championships
2017
1st Derny, National Track Championships
8th Derny, UEC European Track Championships
2018
1st Derny, National Track Championships
2019
1st Derny, National Track Championships
