= Maindy Centre =

Velodrome and pool in Cardiff, Wales

Coordinates: 51°29′48.50″N 3°11′24.00″W

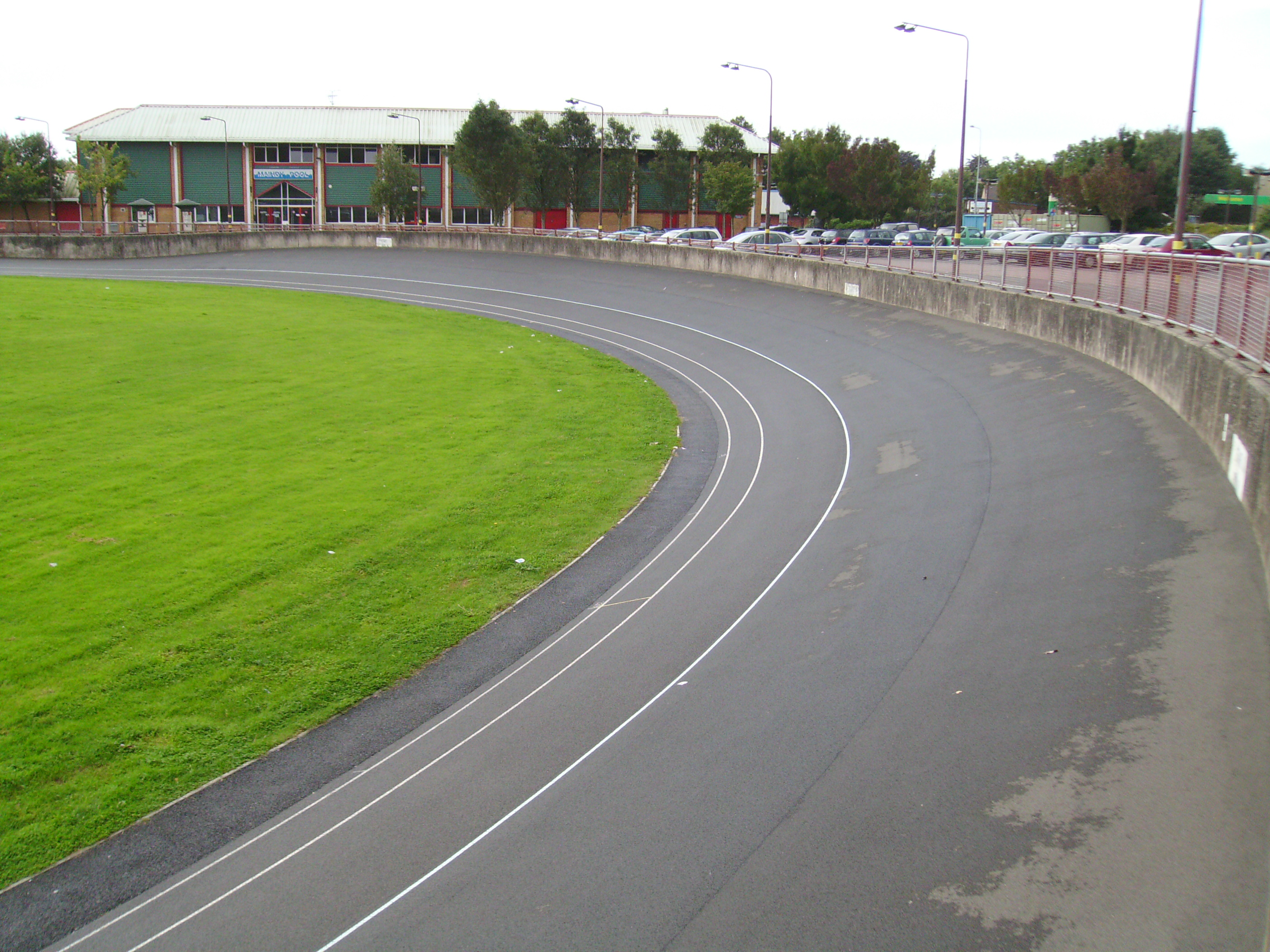
Maindy Pool (top left) and cycle track

Maindy Centre (Welsh: Canolfan Maendy, formerly known as Maindy Stadium, now also known as Maindy Pool and Cycle Track) is a velodrome and indoor swimming pool facility in the Maindy area of Cardiff, Wales. The velodrome was used in the 1958 British Empire and Commonwealth Games and the swimming pool was opened in 1993.

Maindy Stadium opened in 1951. The stadium has previously had an athletics running track, which was transferred from Cardiff Arms Park after the British Empire and Commonwealth Games. It became Cardiff's main athletics stadium until the Cardiff Athletics Stadium was opened in 1989. The stadium has also been used for boxing and Welsh baseball.

== History ==
The grandstand at Maindy Stadium provided cover for 5,000 spectators. Photo taken c.1960

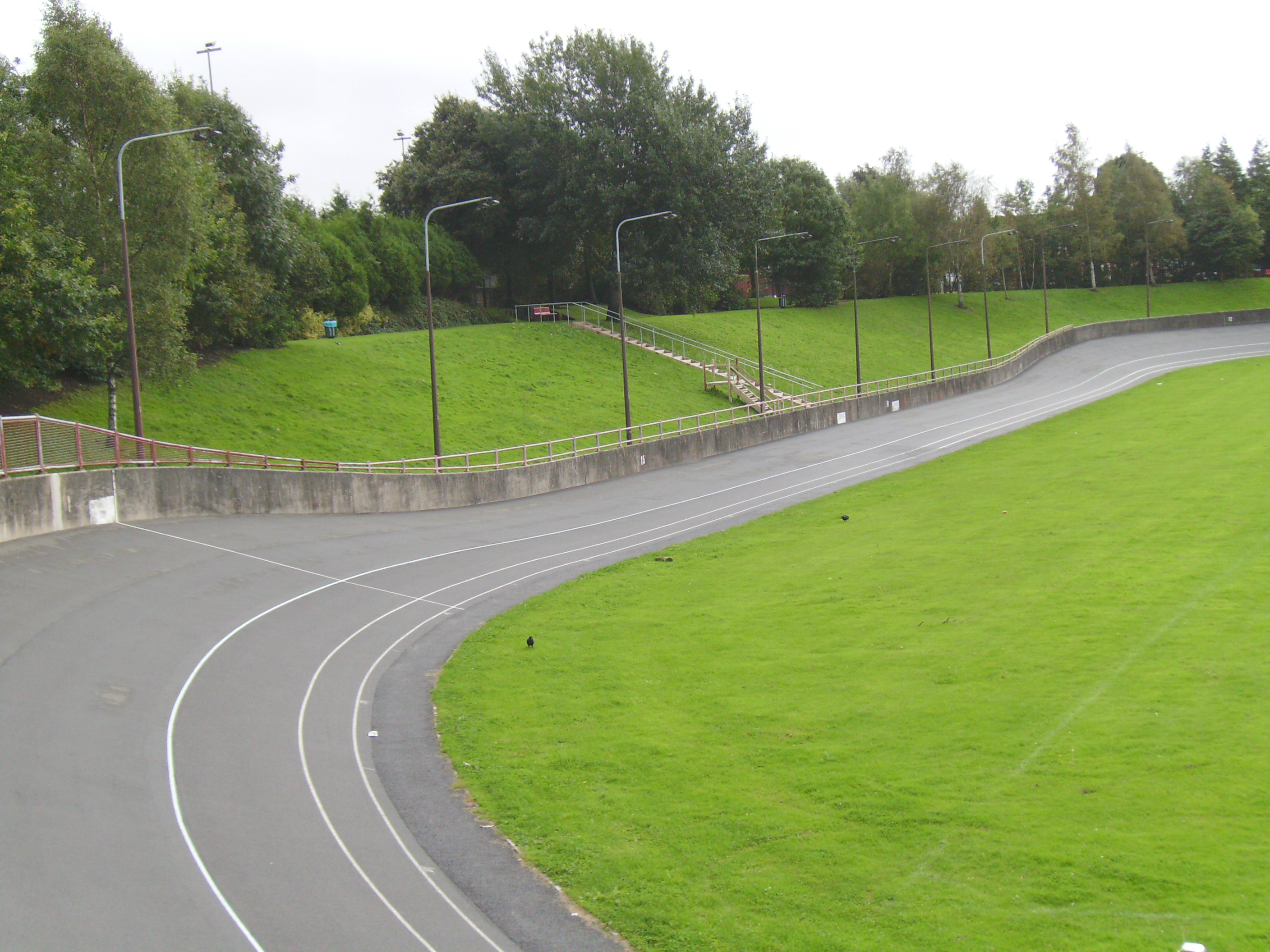
The Maindy Centre, with the grandstand, judge's box, concrete terracing and the running track removed. Photo taken 2008.

The site on which the Maindy Centre stands was gifted by Lord Bute to the people of Cardiff. In the 1920s, it was a clay pit that had been filled with water and household refuse and used for swimming, with a number of adults and children drowned in it. The site was filled in and by May 1951 the new Maindy Stadium was opened. The stadium was designed so that events could be used for the requirements of the Amateur Athletics Association and the National Cyclists' Union.

Boxing matches also took place at Maindy Stadium between May 1935 and July 1963.

== Facilities ==
The 460 metres (1,509.2 ft) outdoor floodlit cycling velodrome was well known for its slight unevenness, caused by subsidence, as the stadium was built on the clay pit. There was a six-lane cinder running track inside the cycle track at one point, but this has since been removed and replaced by a mini football pitches and a road section for traffic safety courses (in the middle of the velodrome. There was also extensive seating and covered area with a judges box in the 1960s, on an area which is now a grass bank behind the back straight of the cycle track. At that time, the finish line on the cycle track was located at the opposite side of the cycle track to its current location.

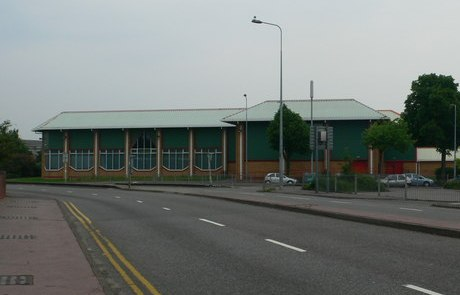
Maindy Swimming Pool

Maindy remains to be used extensively for training and racing and hosts many events such as the Cardiff International Grand Prix. It is used in particular for teaching youngsters to ride. At 460 metres in length and 18 degree bankings, the track is not as steep as the majority of velodromes, and therefore perfect for those new to the sport. The concrete surface is also used for floodlit training sessions during the winter, where road bicycles are used as opposed to track bicycles.

The cycle track has recently been resurfaced, seeing an end to the characteristic red asphalt surface which covered it for several years, funded by the Eddie Smart memorial fund.

The Maindy Flyers Youth Cycling Club is also based at the stadium, and boasts past members such as Geraint Thomas. Riders from the club have gone on to win four of the eight Olympic gold medals won by Welsh sportspeople between 1976 and 2016. The British National Derny Championships were held at the stadium in 2007, local riders and past members of Maindy Flyers, Alex Greenfield and Katie Curtis came second and third respecitvley. Another past members of Maindy Flyers, Matthew Rowe, finished third in the men's championships. Other notable ex-members include Elinor Barker, Luke Rowe and Owain Doull.

The facility also has a 6-lane 25 metres (82.0 ft) length swimming pool, which was opened in 1993, and a 5-a-side pitch,

== See also ==
- List of Commonwealth Games venues
- List of cycling tracks and velodromes
