= Simon Cope =

English cyclist (born 1966)

Personal information
- Full name: Simon Cope
- Born: 22 March 1966 (age 60) South London, England

Cycling career
- Sport: Cycling
- Disciplines: Road & Track
- Role: Rider
- Rider type: Endurance

Amateur teams
- 2002: 34th Nomads CP Hart / Vulcan CRT Metaxa / 34th Nomads Gem Hygiene
- 2004: Team Edwardes
- 2006–2007: Pacific Flanders CRT

Professional teams
- 1988: Emmelle - MBK (GBR)
- 1989: Alpha Print - Crown
- 1990: Crown Printers Engineers - Chafes (GBR)
- 1991: Oakville Cycling (GBR)
- 1992: Bud Light Beer (USA)
- 1993–1994: Omega (GBR)
- 1995–1996: Scott - BiKyle Flyers (USA)
- 1997: Torelli Imports (GBR)
- 1998: Linda McCartney Racing Team (GBR)

Managerial teams
- 2012: Team Exergy
- 2013: Wiggle–Honda
- 2014: Madison Genesis
- 2015–: WIGGINS

Major wins
- 1987 Raleigh Tour of New Zealand One stage win, Points winner, 1985 Ras 3 x Stage winner, Tour de Moor USA, Harlem Crit USA, Wally Gimber UK; National Crit Champion 1997

Simon Cope (born 22 March 1966) is an English former professional cyclist from Sevenoaks, Kent. Cope began cycling in 1978 and rode as professional from 1983 to 1999. He had success at the British National Derny Championships for two consecutive years in 1999 and 2000. Cope was also the National Circuit Race Champion 1997. He subsequently became a coach working on British Cycling's Olympic Academy Programme, spending five years as coach of their women's road and endurance academy. After his post at British Cycling was abolished due to funding cuts, he spent the 2012 season as a directeur sportif at the American Team Exergy team. He also managed the Wiggle–Honda team during the 2013 season and was a directeur sportif with Madison Genesis in 2014. In January 2015, he was named as the directeur sportif of the new UCI Continental level team, WIGGINS.

== Palmarès ==
1993
3rd British National Circuit Race Championships (professional)

1997
1st (United Kingdom) British National Circuit Race Championships

1999
1st (United Kingdom) British National Derny Championships

2000
1st (United Kingdom) British National Motor Pace Championships
