= William Perrett =

British cyclist (born 1996)

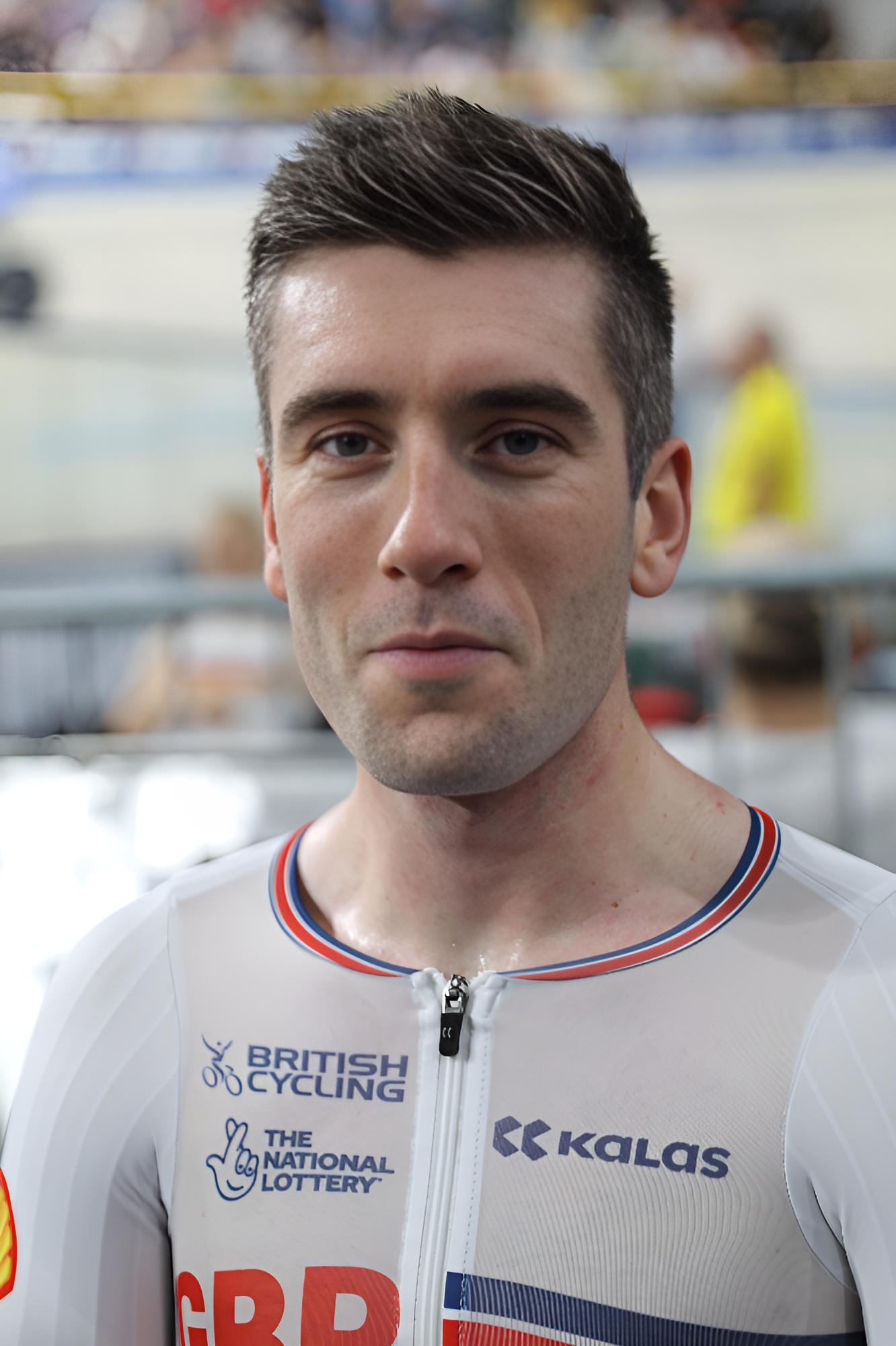

Personal information
- Nickname: Perrett Power
- Born: William Robin Perrett; 23 August 1996 (age 30) Nuthall, Nottinghamshire, England
- Weight: 69 kg (152 lb)

Cycling career
- Sport: Cycling
- Current team: Das Richardsons
- Discipline: Track cycling
- Role: Rider
- Rider type: Pursuit
Medal record
Men's track cycling
Representing Great Britain
European Championships
Bronze medal – third place	2023 Grenchen	Omnium

William Robin Perrett (born 23 August 1996) is a British male track cyclist who currently rides for Spellman Dublin Port cycling team. He previously rode for HUUB-Wattbike Test Team.

== Cycling career ==
Perrett became a British team champion after winning the Team Pursuit Championship at the 2020 British National Track Championships. He followed up his first National title by subsequently winning the British National Derny Championships in 2021 and the British National Madison Championships with Mark Stewart in 2022.

Perrett won his third national title at the 2023 British Cycling National Track Championships, he won the Points race for the first time. Also in 2023, he secured a bronze medal at the 2023 UEC European Track Championships in the omnium.

In 2024, he won the points title again, at the 2024 British Cycling National Track Championships.

== Major wins ==
2020
1st Team pursuit, National Track Championships
2021
1st Derny, National Track Championships
2022
1st Madison, National Track Championships
2023
1st Points race, National Track Championships
2024
1st Points race, National Track Championships
2025
1st Points race, National Track Championships
