= Bryan Taylor (cyclist) =

Personal information
- Full name: Bryan Taylor
- Born: 1968 (age 57–58)

Cycling career
- Sport: Cycling
- Role: Rider

Bryan Taylor (born 1968) is an English cyclist, specialising in road & track riding. He was the British National Stayers Champion for two consecutive years in 1991 and 1992, and the derny champs in 2003, 2005 and 2006. He won the pursuit & the points race at the UCI World Masters Track Championships at Manshester in 2002, in the 30-34 age category.

He also won bronze in the national criterium champs in 2003 in Wales

== Palmarès ==
1991
1st (United Kingdom) British National Stayers Championships

1992
1st (United Kingdom) British National Stayers Championships

2001
2nd points race, UCI World Masters Track Championships (30-34 cat)
1st Omnium, British National Track Championships

2002
1st (Europe) points race, World Masters Track Championships (30-34 cat)
1st (Europe) pursuit, World Masters Track Championships (30-34 cat)
2nd Madison, British National Track Championships

2003
1st (United Kingdom) British National Derny Championships
1st Murratti Cup (10 mile scratch) Masters Race
2nd Team Pursuit, British National Track Championships
3rd National Circuit Race British National Circuit Race Championships

2004
3rd Murratti Cup (10 mile scratch)
2nd Madison, British National Track Championships

2005
1st (United Kingdom) British National Derny Championships

2006
1st (United Kingdom) British National Derny Championships
