= Peter Boyd (cyclist) =

English cyclist

Personal information
- Born: 1963 (age 62–63)

Cycling career
- Sport: Cycling
- Discipline: Track
- Role: Rider

Amateur teams
- 1989-1994: Clayton Velo
- 1995-1997: CC Lancashire
- 2002-Present: VC St Raphael

Peter Boyd (born 1963) is an English male former international cyclist.

== Cycling career ==
Boyd is a multiple British national champion on the track in the tandem (ten times), seven times with Gary Hibbert, once with Neil Campbell and twice with Dave Heald.

He represented England in the 1,000 metres match sprint, at the 1990 Commonwealth Games in Auckland, New Zealand.

== Palmarès ==
1989
1st Tandem, 1989 British National Track Championships

1990
1st Tandem, 1990 British National Track Championships

1991
1st Tandem, 1991 British National Track Championships

1992
1st Tandem, 1992 British National Track Championships

1993
1st Tandem, 1993 British National Track Championships

1994
1st Tandem, 1994 British National Track Championships

1995
1st Tandem, 1995 British National Track Championships
2nd Team Sprint, 1995 British National Track Championships

1998
1st Tandem, 1998 British National Track Championships

2002
1st Tandem, 2002 British National Track Championships

2003
2nd Tandem, 2003 British National Track Championships

2004
1st Tandem, 2004 British National Track Championships

2006
3rd Tandem, 2006 British National Track Championships

2011
3rd Tandem, 2011 British National Track Championships

2013
3rd Tandem, 2013 British National Track Championships

2022
2nd Tandem, 2022 British National Track Championships

2024
3rd Tandem, 2024 British Cycling National Track Championships
