= Palmer Park Stadium =

Stadium in Palmer Park, Reading, England

Coordinates: 51°27′7″N 0°56′13″W

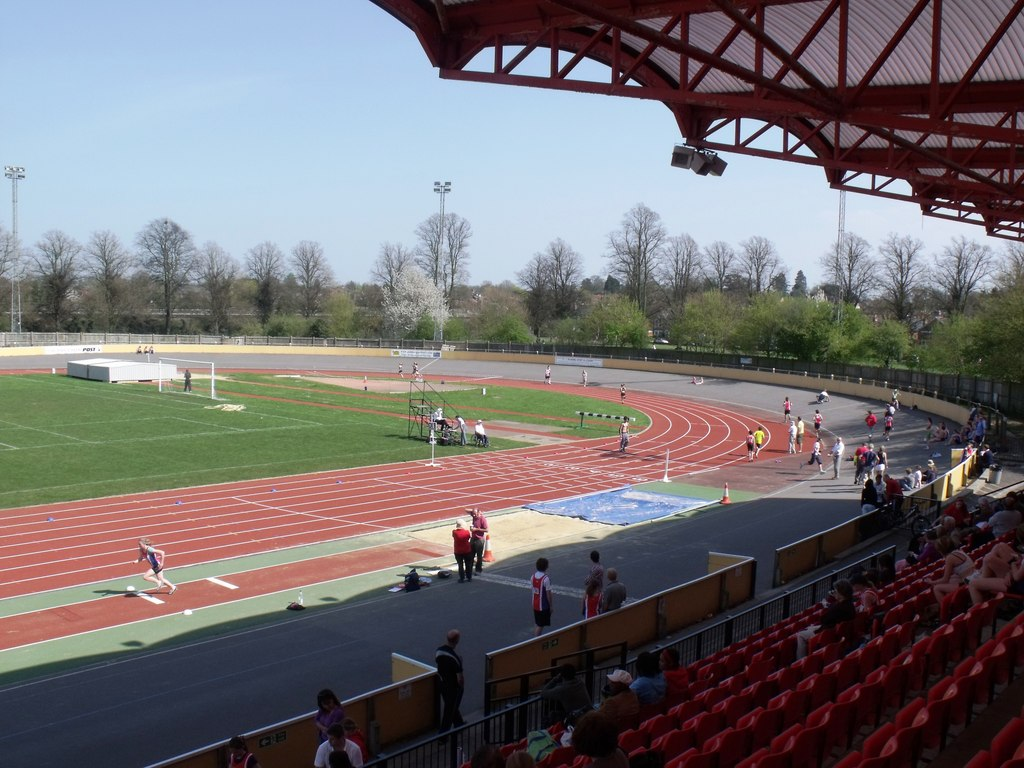
- Interactive map of Palmer Park Stadium
- Full name: Palmer Park Stadium
- Location: Wokingham Road; Reading; Berkshire; RG6 1LF
- Owner: Reading Borough Council
- Capacity: 780
- Surface: Synthetic

Construction
- Opened: 23 April 1988

Tenant
- Highmoor Ibis (2011–2016)

Palmer Park Stadium is located in Palmer Park, Reading. It contains an outdoor velodrome and an athletics stadium. Set in acres of parkland, the stadium provides a focal point for a variety of indoor and outdoor leisure activities.

== Clubs ==
Palmer Park has several clubs who use the facilities:

- Berkshire Renegades an American Football team for training
- Reading Athletic Club
- Reading Roadrunners
- Palmer Park Velo

== Velodrome ==
The velodrome was originally built at the turn of the 20th century, making it one of the oldest in the country. It has hosted weekly track leagues throughout the summer and many national events and championships such as the British National Derny Championships.

459 metres in length, it has been described as one of the country's best asphalt track surfaces, although until 1955 when it was resurfaced, it was a loose red shale which meant riders often slid sideways in the bankings. The velodrome was closed in 2002 due to subsidence, as the track was built on the location of some old chalk pits. Reading Borough Council had the dips filled and the track surface refurbished for the start of the 2003 season. Palmer Park Velo cycling club is based at the velodrome, it caters for children between the ages of 4 and 18. Past members of Palmer Park Velo include John Paul, who in August 2011 won the World Junior Track Sprint Championship. Other past members include the female professional riders Hannah Barnes and Harriet Owen.

In March 2015 British Cycling issued a statement indicating that they had assessed the track as being unfit for racing, and that they would not sanction competition at the velodrome for the foreseeable future, although it could still be used for training purposes. However the track was approved for racing one month later after repairs and other changes to fencing were made.

On 12 August 2026, penny farthing cyclist Richard Thoday beat the record for longest continuous ride, at the velodrome. The previous record had stood since 1886. Thoday beat the record by 2 miles, cycling 236 miles without a break.

== See also ==
- List of cycling tracks and velodromes
