= Matthew Rowe (cyclist) =

Welsh cyclist (born 1988)

Personal information
- Full name: Matthew Rowe
- Born: 28 April 1988 (age 38) Cardiff, Wales
- Height: 1.90 m (6 ft 3 in)
- Weight: 169 lb (77 kg)

Cycling career
- Sport: Cycling
- Current team: NFTO
- Disciplines: Road & Track
- Role: Rider
- Rider type: Road & Track Endurance

Amateur teams
- Maindy Flyers
- Cardiff Ajax CC
- 2006: Glendene CC / Bike Trax
- 2007–2008: Recycling.co.uk
- 2009: CandiTV–Marshalls Pasta
- 2010: Wilier-bigmaggys.com-Prendas Ciclismo
- 2011–2012: CyclePremier.com-Metaltek
- 2013: NFTO

Professional team
- 2014: NFTO Pro Cycling

Matthew Rowe (born 28 April 1988) is a Welsh former racing cyclist.

== Biography ==
Born in Cardiff, Rowe began racing at a young age, initially riding with his parents on a tandem. He began to enjoy cycling and became a member of the Maindy Flyers, based at Maindy Stadium. As a junior, he was a member of British Cycling's Olympic Development Programme, Rowe became the 2005 junior scratch race European champion, and finished eighth in the same event at the junior world championships. Rowe received funding for three to four months from the Dave Rayner fund in 2007. Rowe suffered from Glandular Fever in 2007, and hoping to make his mark on the Premier Calendar, riding for Rapha Condor recycling.co.uk for the 2008 season.

Rowe studied at university for a business degree until 2009 and currently studies as Cornell Law School whilst maintaining membership of the prestigious Cornell Law Review, with the hope of cycling full-time with the aim of a Commonwealth Games gold medal in 2010. However his hopes were scuppered by injuries sustained by a crash in the Rás Tailteann.

His brother Luke is also a racing cyclist, and his father Courtney coaches the Paralympian Simon Richardson.

Rowe is married to Olympic, World and European team pursuit gold medallist Dani King. The couple became engaged in 2015 and were married in Llandaff Cathedral on 30 September 2017.

Matt Rowe founded Rowe & King (May 2015), a cycle coaching company, alongside father Courtney, fiancée Dani King and brother Luke Rowe.

== Major results ==
=== Track ===
2000
1st (United Kingdom) Under 12 Omnium, British National Track Championships

2005
1st (Europe) Scratch Race, European Track Championships – Junior
2nd Team pursuit, British National Track Championships (with Jonathan Bellis, Alex Dowsett & Russell Hampton) – Senior
2nd Madison, British National Track Championships (with Ben Swift) – Senior

2006
2nd Madison, British National Track Championships (with Adam Blythe) – Senior
2nd Scratch race, British National Track Championships – Junior

2007
3rd British National Derny Championships, Maindy Stadium

2010
1st (United Kingdom) British National Derny Championships, Quibell Park Velodrome

=== Road ===
2005
2nd Welsh National Road Race Championships – Junior

2008
1st Severn Bridge Road Race
1st Border Road Race

2013
1st Norman Harris Memorial Race
