= Spencer Wingrave =

Personal information
- Full name: Spencer Robert Wingrave
- Born: 16 December 1969 (age 56) England; United Kingdom

Cycling career
- Sport: Cycling
- Discipline: Track
- Role: Rider
- Rider type: Endurance

Amateur team
- 1988: Old Kent CC

Professional teams
- 1993: Neilson-Tivoli
- 1994: Futurama-Creatabolin
- 1995: Roberts Cycles

Spencer Robert Wingrave (born 16 December 1969) is an English racing cyclist, specialising in endurance track riding and madisons.

== Cycling career ==
Born in the Bexley area in 1969, Wingrave represented England in the points race, at the 1990 Commonwealth Games in Auckland, New Zealand.

He turned professional aged 22 in 1992 and went on to represent Great Britain at international events. Wingrave came second to Paul Curran in the British National Derny Champion in three consecutive years (1993–1995).

== Palmarès ==
1993
2nd British National Circuit Race Championships (professional)
2nd British National Derny Championships

1994
2nd British National Derny Championships

1995
2nd British National Derny Championships
