= Reading Athletic Club =

British athletic club

- Founded: 1881
- Ground: Palmer Park Stadium
- Location: Wokingham Rd, Earley, Reading RG6 1LF
- Coordinates: 51°27′07″N 0°56′13″W
- Website: official website

Reading Athletic Club, is an athletics club based in Reading, Berkshire, England. The club officially formed in November 1881; however records show that it was one of the inaugural clubs that formed the governing body of athletics at that time, the Amateur Athletic Association (AAA) in 1880. There are also references dating back to the late 1860s, making the club one of the oldest and longest established athletic clubs in the United Kingdom.

== History ==
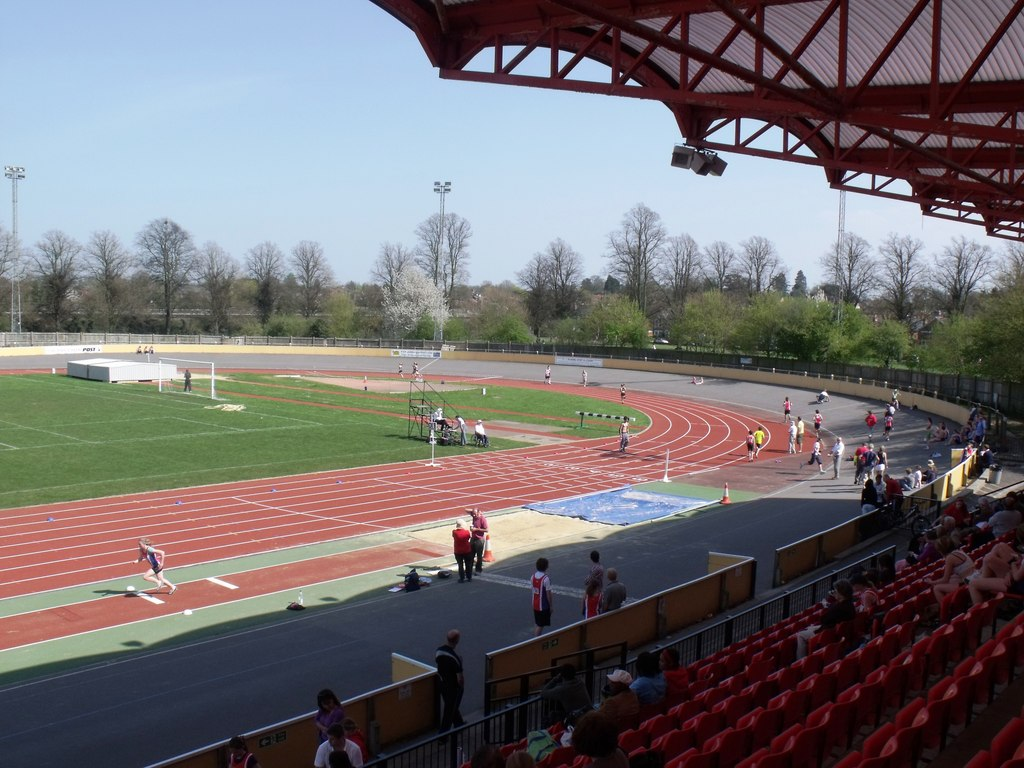
Reading AC meeting in 2010 at the Palmer Park Stadium

Reading Athletic Club's earliest Olympian was Billy Leach who qualified for the 1912 Summer Olympics in Stockholm for the long jump and standing long jump after finishing second in the Olympic trial at Stamford Bridge but did not start the event.

In 1964 Ann Packer became Britain's first female Olympic gold medalist, winning the 800 metres event at the 1964 Summer Olympics.

== Notable athletes ==
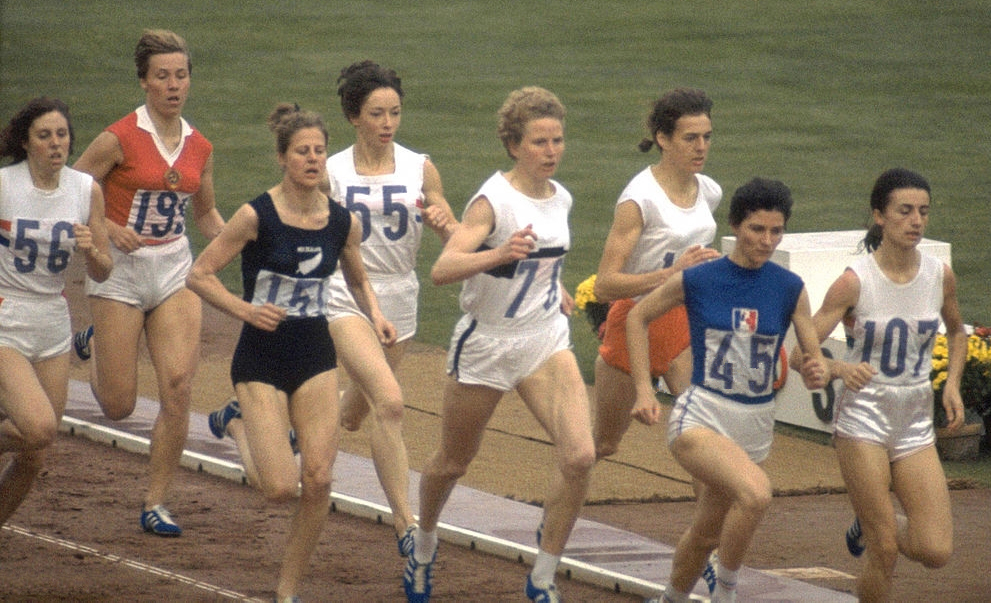
Ann Packer (no.55) on her way to Olympic gold

=== Olympians ===
Athlete	Events	Games	Medals/Pos, Ref
Billy Leach	Long jump	1912	
Henry Oliver	3000 m steeplechase	1928	
Harry Whittle	400 m hurdles, long jump	1948, 1952	
Ann Packer	400 m, 800 m	1964	Gold medal Silver medal
Bev Goddard-Callender	200 m, 4×100 m, 4×400 m	1976, 1980, 1984	Bronze medal Bronze medal
Kathy Smallwood-Cook	100 m, 200 m, 400 m, 4×100 m	1980, 1984	Bronze medal Bronze medal Bronze medal
Simmone Jacobs	100 m, 200 m, 4×100 m	1984, 1988, 1992, 1996	Bronze medal

=== Commonwealth Games ===
Athlete	Events	Games	Medals/Pos, Ref
Anthony Chivers	3 miles	1950	Bronze medal
Nigel Spratley	Shot put	1994	
