= Sophie Tea =

British visual artist (born 1993)

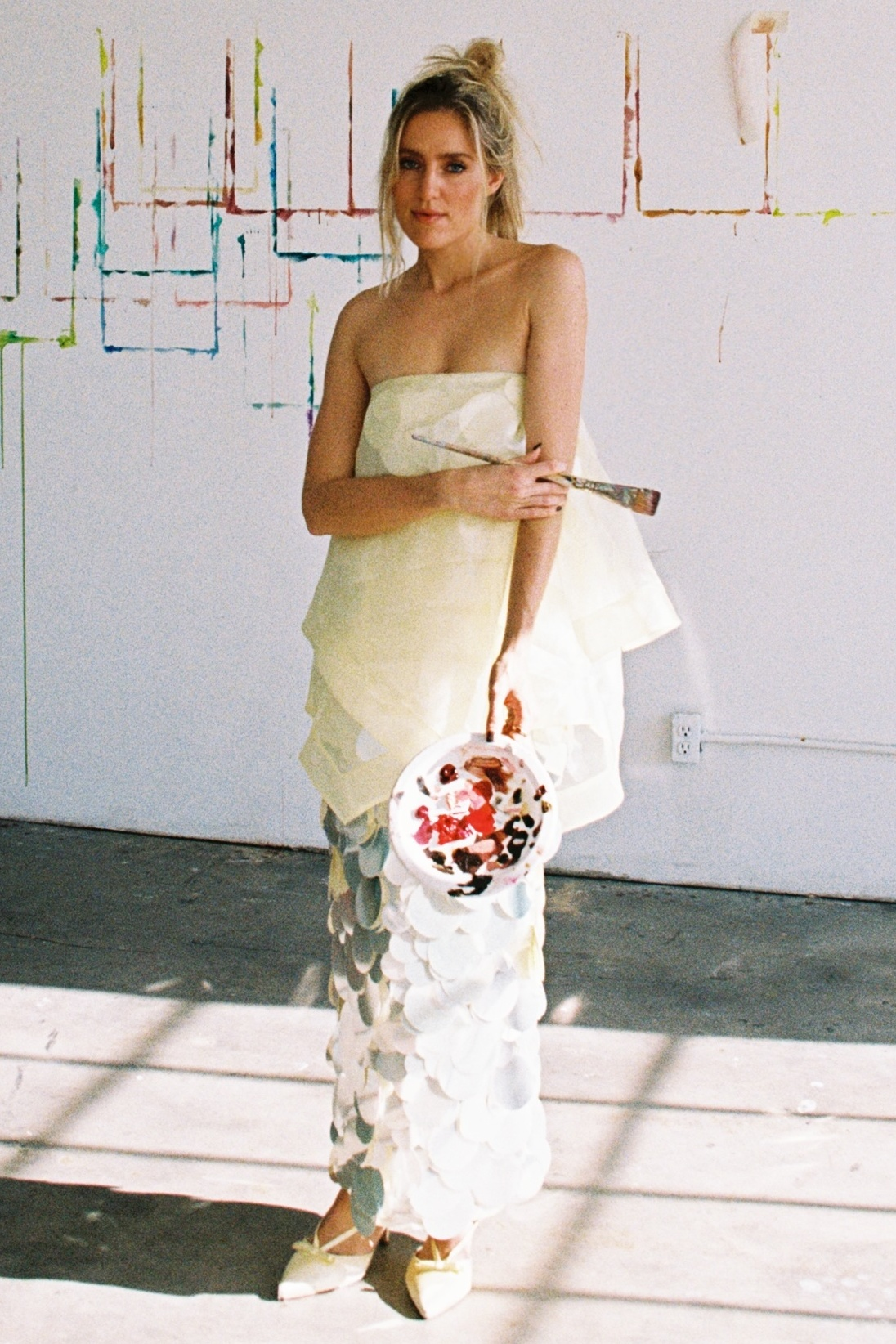
- Tea in studio in 2026
- Born: Sophie Terry; 21 January 1993 (age 33)
- Occupation: Visual artist
- Website: sophieteaart.com

Sophie Terry (born 21 January 1993), known professionally as Sophie Tea, is an English contemporary visual artist. She opened up galleries in Australia and London and also launched the social media series "Charity Shop Friday" in 2024.

== Life and career ==
Tea was born Sophie Terry in Wolverhampton and raised in Birmingham and Northwich, Cheshire. She graduated with a business degree from Aston University and visited India as one last trip before starting a job as a consultant in London. After running low on funds, Tea painted a picture of a multi-coloured cow over a hostel's graffitied wall in exchange for accommodation. After receiving positive feedback, she left her job and began painting nudes. After moving back in with her parents, she set up the Yoke app linking artists with buyers and sought investment for it, but aborted that idea at the behest of an investor.

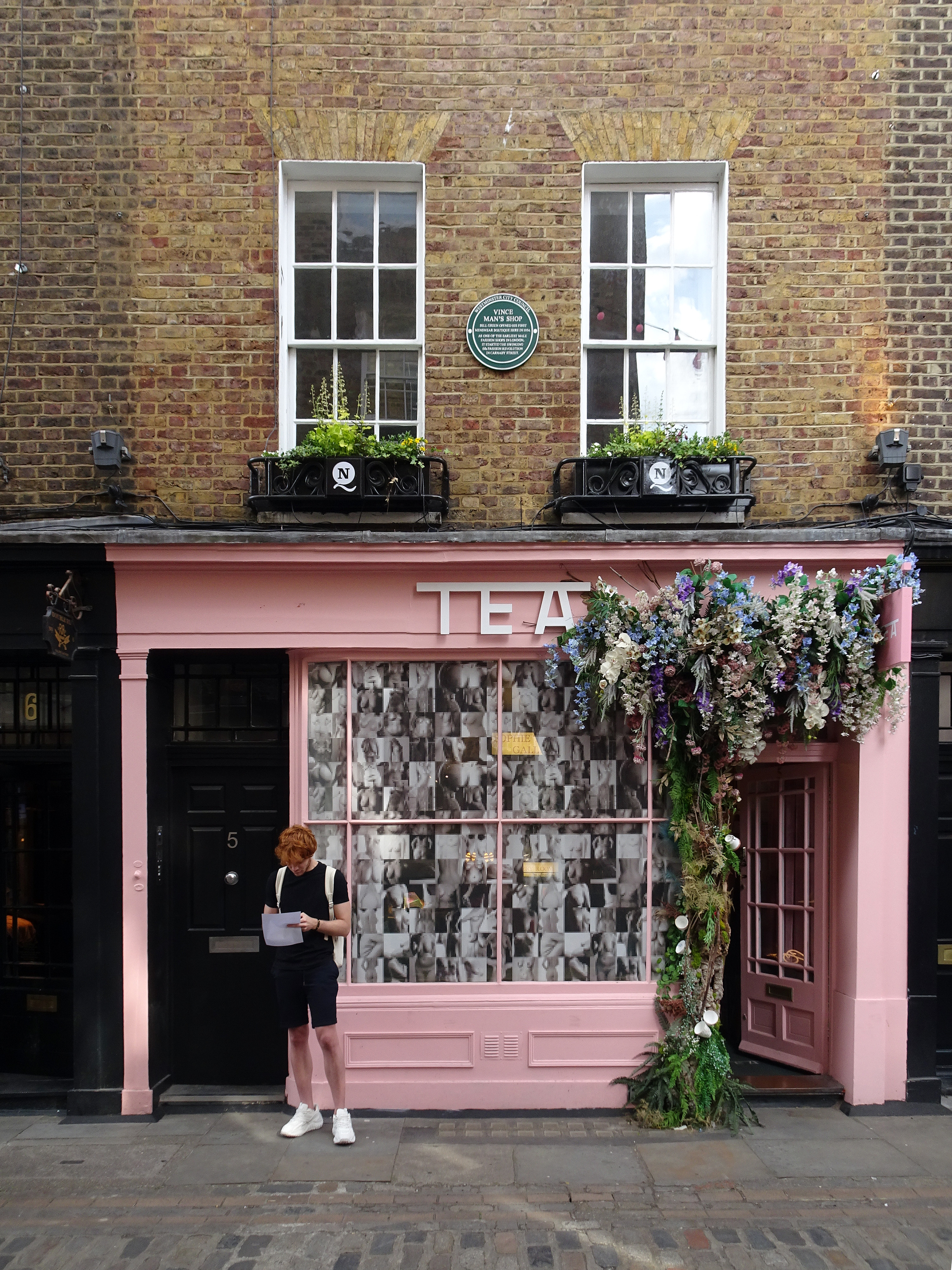
Tea's Carnaby Street branch

After tiring of trawling Google for naked women to paint, Tea asked her female Instagram followers to send photos of themselves nude; among the respondents were an eighty-year-old and people with self-harm scars, stoma bags, and stretch marks. She opened galleries in London's Carnaby Street and Sydney in 2020, having moved to the latter by the time of the COVID-19 pandemic. By February 2021, her works also included paintings of multi-coloured hearts, slogans, and a homage to McDonald's fries. After returning to the UK, she launched a social media series "Charity Shop Friday" in 2024, in which she visited a charity shop, bought an item, painted it, returned it for the same price, and then raffled her painting for charity.
