= Bini Adamczak =

German feminist and political writer (born 1979)

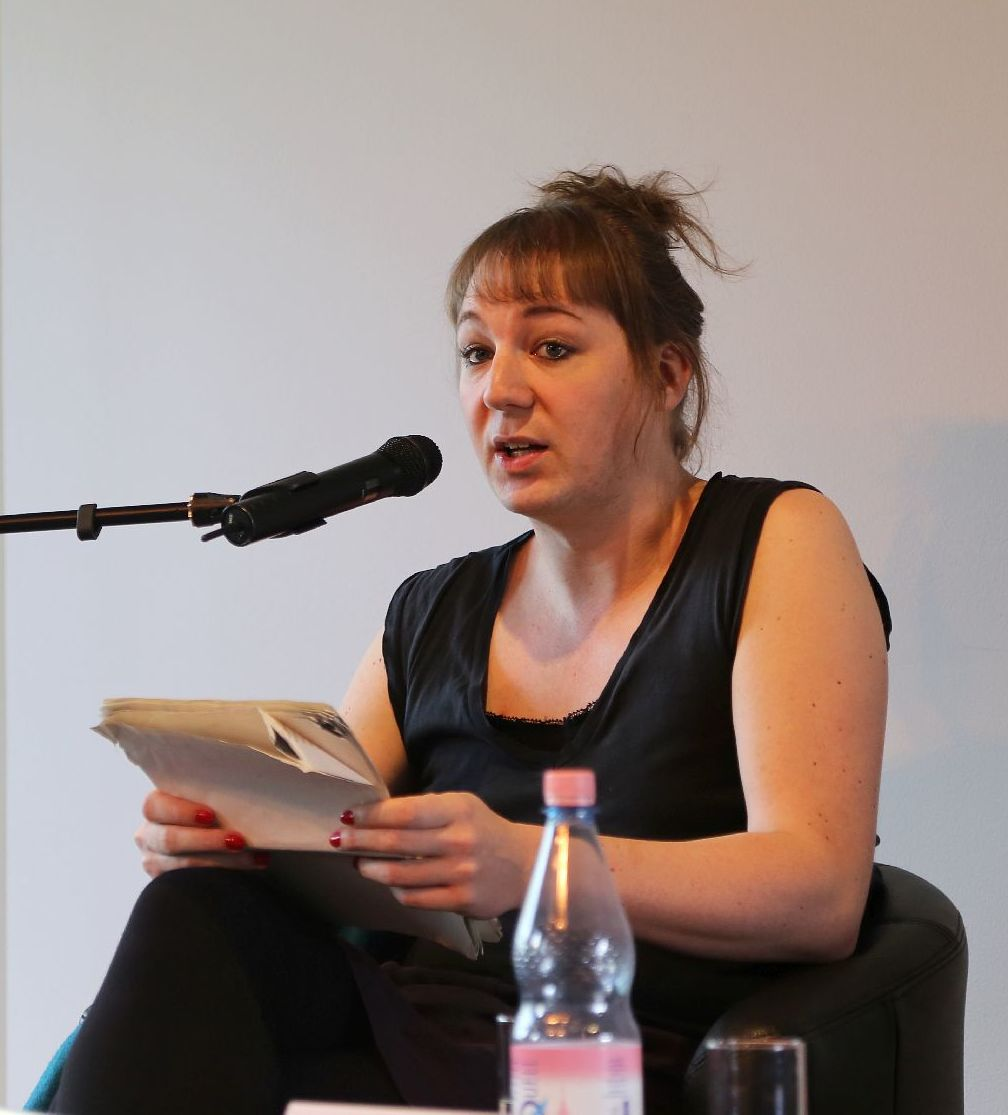
- Adamczak in 2015
- Born: 21 December 1979 (age 46)
- Occupation: Writer
- Years active: 2004–present
- Known for: Neologism
- Notable work: Communism for kids, Yesterday's Tomorrow: On the Loneliness of Communist Specters and the Reconstruction of the Future

Bini Adamczak (born 21 December 1979) is a German feminist and political writer in the field of communism and queer politics. She is known for the invention of the neologism "circlusion" in her article "On Circlusion".

== Life and Works ==
During the 2000s, she was part of the Frankfurt group Sinistra! - Radikale Linke (Radical Left).

In 2004, she published her first book for children, Communism for Kids, in which she explains capitalism and communism according to Karl Marx. The epilogue on the underlying theory of communism is written for parents. The book was a success and has been translated into fifteen languages since 2013. It has, however, also received criticism and pushback from conservative groups in the United States.

Adamczak published her second book, the essay Yesterday's Tomorrow, which retraces the history of communism since the October Revolution, in 2007.

She co-wrote the play, Everybody Needs Only You. Love in the Time of Capitalism with Kostanze Schmitt. It was performed in December 2019 at the Hebbel am Ufer theater in Berlin.

Adamczak currently lives in Berlin and is a member of Jour fixe initiative berlin.

== Books ==
- Yesterday's Tomorrow: On the Loneliness of Communist Specters and the Reconstruction of the Future (MIT Press, 2021)
- Communism for Kids (MIT Press, 2017)
