= Russell Williams (cyclist) =

English racing cyclist, cycling coach, and cycling journalist

Personal information
- Full name: Russell Williams
- Born: 14 April 1961 (age 65) London, United Kingdom

Cycling career
- Sport: Cycling
- Disciplines: Road and track
- Role: Rider, coach & commentator
- Rider type: Sprinter

Professional teams
- 1989: Ever Ready
- 1990: Ever Ready – Halfords
- 1991–1994: Geoffrey Butler
- 1995: Geoffrey Butler – Lusso
- 1996: Ambrosia Desserts

Russell Williams (born 14 April 1961) is an English former professional road and track cyclist from London. Williams is also a cycling coach and David Duffield's co-commentator on Eurosport.

== Palmarès ==
1978
1st (United Kingdom) British National Road Race Championships – Junior
1983
1st Quad Cities (USA)

1984
1st Quad Cities (USA)

1989
1st Sprint classification, Tour of Ireland

1990
1st British National Keirin Championships

1994
3rd British National Derny Championships

1996
2nd British National Derny Championships
2nd points race, British National Track Championships

1997
2nd British National Derny Championships

1998
2nd British National Derny Championships

1999
2nd British National Derny Championships

2002
1st (United Kingdom) British National Derny Championships
2nd Madison, British National Track Championships

2003
1st scratch race, British National Masters Championships (40-44 cat)
1st points race, British National Masters Championships (40-44 cat)
