= Geraint Thomas National Velodrome =

Sports venue in Newport, Wales

Coordinates: 51°34′27″N 2°57′26″W

- Wales National Velodrome
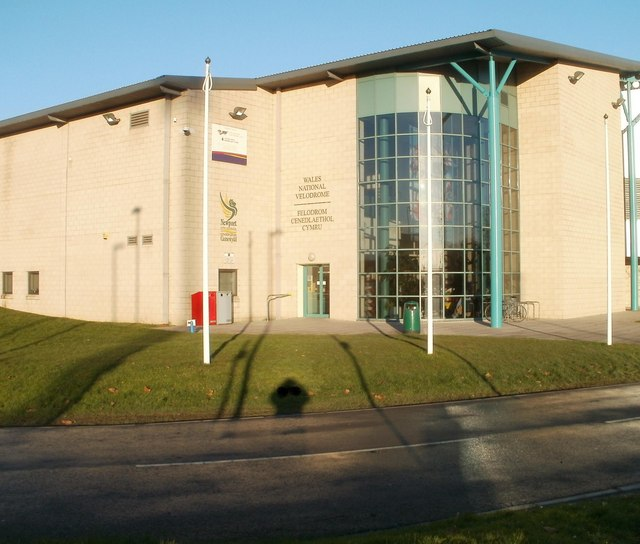
- Entrance
- Interactive map of Geraint Thomas National Velodrome
- Location: Velodrome Way, Newport NP19 4RB
- Capacity: 500

Construction
- Opened: 2003

The Geraint Thomas National Velodrome, previously known as the Wales National Velodrome, in Newport, South Wales, is an indoor arena located in the Newport International Sports Village, Lliswerry. The Velodrome's facilities including a covered 250-metre Siberian pine track, a function room/dance studio, free weights room, fitness suite, a drug-testing room and a multipurpose indoor sports arena.

It has seating for 500 spectators. The Newport Velodrome hosts the Head Office of Welsh Cycling and Newport Velo Youth Cycling Club is based at the centre.

An outdoor cycle speedway track home of Newport Cycle Speedway Club is located at the Velodrome.

The Velodrome was used by the British track cycling team for its pre-event holding camps ahead of the 2008, 2012, 2016, 2020 and 2024 Summer Olympics.

It was announced in August 2018 that the velodrome would be renamed after the UK's third and Wales' first-ever Tour de France winner Geraint Thomas, who won the 2018 edition of the Tour.

The velodrome hosted the 2022 and 2023 editions of the British National Track Championships.

== See also ==
- List of cycling tracks and velodromes
