= Sophie Lewis =

British feminist author (born 1988)

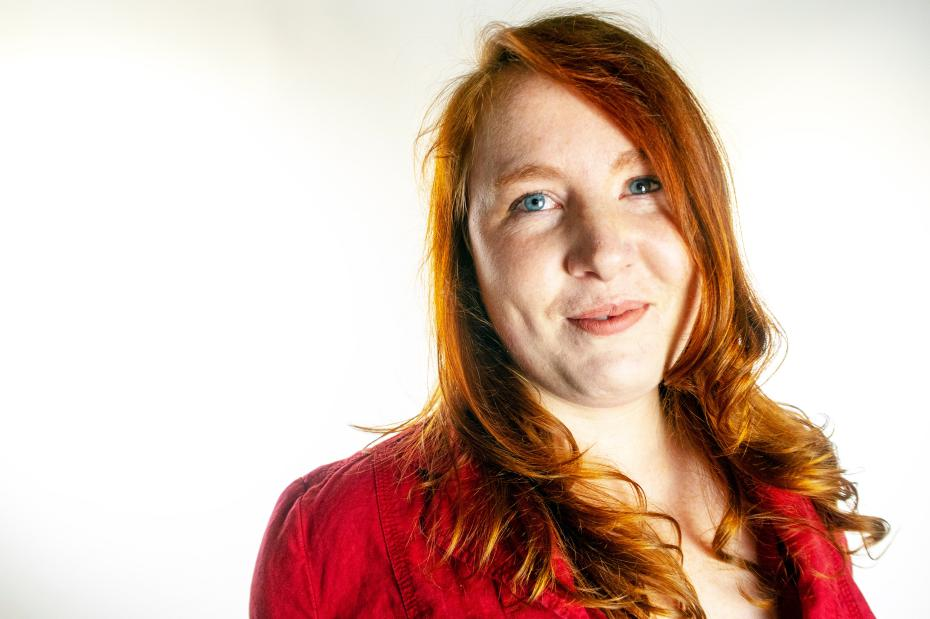
- Born: 1988 (age 37–38); Vienna, Austria

Education
- Education: University of Oxford (BA); The New School (MA); University of Manchester (PhD)

Philosophical work
- Era: Contemporary philosophy
- Region: Western philosophy
- Institutions: University of Pennsylvania
- Main interests: Anti-state communism; transfeminism; literary criticism; cultural analysis
- Website: lasophielle.org

Sophie Lewis (born 1988) is a German-British writer and independent scholar based in Philadelphia, mainly known for her anti-state communism, transfeminism, literary criticism, and cultural analysis, especially her critical-utopian theorization of "full surrogacy", her idea that "all reproduction is assisted" as well as "amniotechnics", and her advocacy for family abolition.

== Early life and education ==
Lewis was born in Vienna and raised between Geneva and France. Her mother, Ingrid Helga Lewis, was a middle-class German liberal who was once a Maoist involved in the West German student movement at the University of Göttingen. Her maternal grandfather was an Adolf Hitler supporter and served in the Wehrmacht and her maternal grandmother was ex-Jewish. Her parents met in Vienna when her mother worked for the BBC German Service. According to Lewis, her mother discovered her Jewish heritage in 2008; her mother's family, the Sternbergs, had changed their surname and had converted to Christianity shortly before The Holocaust "in order to embrace anti-Semitic Gentile life." Lewis's mother was an Anglophile who repudiated German culture and refused to teach her children the German language.

== Career ==
After completing her PhD, Lewis published her first book, Full Surrogacy Now: Feminism against the Family. It examines the surrogacy industry with a focus on the contradictions of capitalist reproduction. It was followed by Abolish the Family: A Manifesto for Care and Liberation in 2022, in which "Lewis imagines a future where the labor of making new human beings is shared among all of us, 'mother' no longer being a natural category, but instead something we can choose." Lewis' third book, Enemy Feminisms: TERFs, Policewomen, and Girlbosses Against Liberation looks at competing versions of feminism historically.

Lewis has published essays in Harper's Magazine, the London Review of Books, Boston Review, Frankfurter Allgemeine Zeitung, Logic(s), The Baffler Lux Magazine, Parapraxis, Tank, The Nation, e-flux, Mal Journal, Dissent, The New Inquiry, Jacobin, The White Review, and Salvage. Lewis's articles have appeared in Feminist Theory, Paragraph, Feminist Review, Signs, Frontiers: A Journal of Women Studies, Gender, Place & Culture, and Dialogues in Human Geography.

Lewis's German-English translations for MIT Press include A Brief History of Feminism (Antje Schrupp) and Communism for Kids (Bini Adamczak). Her translation of Sabine Hark and Paula-Irene Villa Braslavsky's book The Future of Difference: Beyond the Toxic Entanglement of Racism, Sexism and Feminism was published by Verso Books in 2020.

== Reception ==
Lewis's work has been positively reviewed in The New Yorker, the London Review of Books, The Times Literary Supplement, the New Statesman, and Libcom.org.

Conservative commentators Ben Sixsmith and Mary Harrington wrote negative reviews of Lewis's book Full Surrogacy Now in the journal First Things. Some centrist, left-leaning, and social democratic commentators have been critical of her work, including Amber A'Lee Frost, Tom Whyman, Angela Nagle, Antonella Gambotto-Burke, and others. Most of the criticism is towards her views that "children don't belong to anyone" and "children belong to us all," as described by Richard Seymour in his essay "Notes on a Normie Shit-Storm".

== Books ==
- Full Surrogacy Now: Feminism Against Family, Verso Books (2019) ISBN 978-1-78663-731-4
- Abolish the Family: A Manifesto for Care and Liberation, Verso Books (2022) ISBN 9781839767197
- Enemy Feminisms: TERFs, Policewomen, and Girlbosses Against Liberation, Haymarket Books (2025) ISBN 9798888902493
