= Achievements of members of City of Edinburgh Racing Club =

This is a list of achievements by members of City of Edinburgh Racing Club in national and international competitions.

== International Medals Won by Club Members ==
The following medals have been won by riders representing their country whilst members of the City of Edinburgh Racing Club.

=== Olympic Games ===
- 2000 – Team Sprint – Chris Hoy, Craig MacLean and Jason Queally

=== World Championships ===
- 1999 – Team Sprint – Chris Hoy and Craig MacLean
- 2000 – Team Sprint – Chris Hoy, Craig MacLean and Jason Queally
- 2011 – Junior Sprint – John Paul

=== Commonwealth Games ===
- 1986 – Sprint Eddie Alexander
- 2002 – Team Sprint Marco Librizzi
- 2006 – Points Race – Kate Cullen
- 2010 – Team Sprint – Jenny Davis and Charline Joiner

== Medals Won by Club Members in British Championships ==
- 1984
  - 1500 m Grass – Steve Paulding
  - 20 km Scratch Race – Steve Paulding
  - 1 km Time Trial – Eddie Alexander
- 1985
  - 20 km Scratch Race – Steve Paulding
  - 1 km Time Trial – Eddie Alexander
  - Sprint – Eddie Alexander
  - Tandem Sprint – Eddie Alexander and Steve Paulding
- 1986
  - 20 km Scratch Race – Steve Paulding
  - Sprint – Stewart Brydon
  - Tandem Sprint – Stewart Brydon and Steve Paulding
- 1987
  - Sprint – Eddie Alexander
  - 1 km Time Trial – Eddie Alexander
  - Tandem Sprint – Stewart Brydon and Eddie Alexander
  - Sprint – Stewart Brydon
  - 1 km Time Trial – Steve Paulding
- 1988
  - Sprint – Eddie Alexander
  - Tandem Sprint – Stewart Brydon and Eddie Alexander
  - Sprint – Stewart Brydon
  - 1 km Time Trial – Eddie Alexander
  - 1 km Time Trial – Steve Paulding
- 1989
  - Sprint – Stewart Brydon
  - 1 km Time Trial – Steve Paulding
  - Sprint – Eddie Alexander
  - 1 km Time Trial – Stewart Brydon
  - Sprint – Steve Paulding
- 1990
  - Sprint – Stewart Brydon
  - 1 km Time Trial – Steve Paulding
  - Sprint – Steve Paulding
  - 1 km Time Trial – Eddie Alexander
  - Tandem Sprint – Eddie Alexander
- 1991
  - Sprint – Stewart Brydon
  - Sprint – Eddie Alexander
  - 1 km Time Trial – Anthony Stirrat
  - Sprint – Steve Paulding
  - 1 km Time Trial – Steve Paulding
  - 20 km Scratch Race – Steve Clark
- 1992
  - Sprint – Stewart Brydon
  - 1 km Time Trial – Anthony Stirrat
  - 20 km Scratch Race – Anthony Stirrat
  - Sprint – Steve Paulding
  - 1 km Time Trial – Steve Paulding
- 1993
  - Sprint – Stewart Brydon
  - Keirin – Stewart Brydon
  - Team Sprint – Stewart Brydon, Marco Librizzi, Steve Paulding and Anthony Stirrat
  - 1 km Time Trial – Anthony Stirrat
  - Omnium – Anthony Stirrat
  - Tandem Sprint – Marco Librizzi
  - 1 km Time Trial – Steve Paulding
- 1994
  - Sprint – Stewart Brydon
  - 20 km Scratch Race – Anthony Stirrat
  - Team Sprint – Stewart Brydon, Marco Librizzi, Steve Paulding and Scott McWilliam
  - Keirin – Marco Librizzi
  - Points Race – Anthony Stirrat
  - Tandem Sprint – Marco Librizzi and Steve Paulding
  - Team Pursuit – Graeme Heard, Scott McWilliam, Martin Williamson, Nicky Hall and Jamie Henderson
- 1995
  - Sprint – Steve Paulding
  - Keirin – Steve Paulding
  - Olympic Sprint – Stewart Brydon, Chris Hoy, Steve Paulding and Peter Jacques
  - Omnium – Anthony Stirrat
  - 20 km Scratch Race – Anthony Stirrat
  - Team Pursuit – Graeme Heard, Chris Hoy, Martin Williamson, Nicky Hall and Jamie Henderson
  - Omnium – Nicky Hall
  - 1 km Time Trial – Anthony Stirrat
  - Points Race – Anthony Stirrat
- 1996
  - Keirin – Peter Jacques
  - Olympic Sprint – Craig MacLean, Chris Hoy, Steve Paulding and Peter Jacques
  - Sprint – Craig MacLean
  - Team Pursuit – Nicky Hall, Chris Hoy, Graeme Heard, Craig MacLean, Martin Williamson and Neil Walker
  - Keirin – Craig MacLean
  - Sprint – Peter Jacques
  - 1 km Time Trial – Craig MacLean
- 1997
  - Sprint – Craig MacLean
  - 20 km Scratch Race – Craig MacLean
  - 1 km Time Trial – Craig MacLean
  - Keirin – Peter Jacques
  - Omnium – Peter Jacques
  - Olympic Sprint – Craig MacLean, Chris Hoy, Steve Paulding and Peter Jacques
  - Team Pursuit – Richard Chapman, Chris Hoy, Scott McWilliam, Craig MacLean, Neil Walker and Steve Whitcome
  - Sprint – Peter Jacques
  - 1 km Time Trial – Chris Hoy
- 1998
  - Sprint – Craig MacLean
  - 1 km Time Trial – Craig MacLean
  - Olympic Sprint – Craig MacLean, Chris Hoy, Peter Jacques and Steve Whitcome
  - Omnium – Peter Jacques
  - 20 km Scratch Race – Peter Jacques
  - Sprint – Chris Hoy
  - 1 km Time Trial – Chris Hoy
  - Team Pursuit – Richard Chapman, Nicky Hall, Neil Walker and Steve Whitcome
- 1999
  - Sprint – Craig MacLean
  - 1 km Time Trial – Craig MacLean
  - Omnium – Peter Jacques
  - Olympic Sprint – Craig MacLean, James Taylor and Peter Jacques
  - Omnium – James Taylor
  - 1 km Time Trial – Chris Hoy
  - Omnium – Craig MacLean
  - 20 km Scratch Race – James Taylor
  - Team Pursuit – Derek Smith, Nicky Hall, Craig MacLean and James Taylor
- 2000
  - Sprint – Craig MacLean
  - Keirin – Craig MacLean
  - Omnium – James Taylor
  - Madison – James Taylor
  - Olympic Sprint – Craig MacLean, Chris Hoy and James Taylor
  - Sprint – Chris Hoy
  - Tandem Sprint – Peter Jacques
  - 1 km Time Trial – Craig MacLean
  - Points Race – James Taylor
  - Derny – James Taylor
  - Tandem Sprint – Stefan Collins
- 2001
  - Sprint – Craig MacLean
  - 1 km Time Trial – Craig MacLean
  - Olympic Sprint – Chris Hoy, Jason Queally and James Taylor
  - Madison – James Taylor
  - Points Race – James Taylor
  - Omnium – James Taylor
  - Points Race – Ross Muir
  - Derny – James Taylor
  - Team Pursuit – Ross Muir, David Lowe, James McCallum and Richard Chapman
- 2002
  - Omnium – James Taylor
  - Madison – James Taylor
  - Keirin – James Taylor
  - Olympic Sprint – Marco Librizzi, Matthew Haynes and James Taylor
  - 20 km Scratch Race – James Taylor
- 2003
  - Omnium – James Taylor
  - Women's 15 km Scratch Race – Kate Cullen
  - Keirin – Matthew Haynes
  - Women's Sprint – Kate Cullen
  - Women's 500 m Time Trial – Kate Cullen
  - Olympic Sprint – Marco Librizzi, James Taylor and Matthew Haynes
- 2004
  - 1 km Time Trial – Matthew Haynes
  - Madison – James Taylor
  - Keirin – Matthew Haynes
  - Sprint – Matthew Haynes
  - Women's Sprint – Kate Cullen
  - Women's Points Race – Kate Cullen
  - Women's 15 km Scratch Race – Kate Cullen
  - Women's 500 m Time Trial – Kate Cullen
  - Olympic Sprint – James Taylor, Graeme Steen, Marco Librizzi and Matthew Haynes
  - Keirin – James Taylor
  - Omnium – Mark Kelly
  - Sprint – Marco Librizzi
- 2005
  - Omnium – Mark Kelly
  - Women's Derny – Kate Cullen
  - Women's Points Race – Kate Cullen
  - Sprint – Marco Librizzi
  - Omnium – Anthony Stirrat
  - Olympic Sprint – Shane Charlton, Marco Librizzi and Graeme Steen
- 2006
  - Women's Points Race – Kate Cullen
  - Omnium – Anthony Stirrat
- 2007
  - Women's Points Race – Kate Cullen
  - Women's 15 km Scratch Race – Kate Cullen
  - Olympic Sprint – Marco Librizzi
  - 400 m Grass – Bruce Croall
- 2008
  - 400 m Grass – Bruce Croall
  - Team Sprint – Kevin Stewart, Matthew Haynes and Bruce Croall
  - Women's Team Sprint – Jenny Davis and Charline Joiner
  - Women's 800 m Grass – Daisy Sherwood
- 2009
  - Women's 800 m Grass – Daisy Sherwood
  - 800 m Grass – Bruce Croall
  - Tandem Sprint – Matthew Haynes and Bruce Croall
  - Women's Team Sprint – Jenny Davis and Charline Joiner
  - Omnium – Matthew Haynes
  - Team Sprint – Kevin Stewart, Matthew Haynes and Bruce Croall
- 2010
  - 1 km Time Trial – Bruce Croall
  - Team Sprint – John Paul, Kevin Stewart and Callum Skinner
  - Women's Team Sprint – Jenny Davis and Charline Joiner
  - Women's Team Sprint – Emma Baird and Kayleigh Brogan
- 2011
  - Women's Team Sprint – Jenny Davis and Kayleigh Brogan
  - 400 m Grass – Bruce Croall
  - 800 m Grass – Bruce Croall
- 2012
  - Sprint – Callum Skinner
  - Tandem Sprint –Bruce Croall and Kenneth Ayre
  - 1 km Time Trial – Bruce Croall
  - Women's Pursuit – Charline Joiner

=== Junior and Youth ===
- 1983
  - Junior Sprint – Tom Glen
- 1988
  - Junior Pursuit – Anthony Stirrat
- 1994
  - Junior Sprint – Chris Hoy
- 2000
  - Youth u16 Sprint – Matthew Haynes
  - Youth u16 Pursuit – Matthew Haynes
  - Youth u16 Scratch Race – Matthew Haynes
  - Youth u16 Points Race – Matthew Haynes
  - Youth u16 500 m Time Trial – Matthew Haynes
- 2001
  - Junior Scratch Race – Matthew Haynes
  - Junior 1 km Time Trial – Matthew Haynes
  - Junior Sprint – Matthew Haynes
- 2002
  - Junior 1 km Time Trial – Matthew Haynes
  - Junior Sprint – Matthew Haynes
  - Junior Scratch Race – Matthew Haynes
- 2004
  - Junior Keirin – Thomas Smith
  - Junior 1 km Time Trial – Thomas Smith
- 2005
  - Junior1 km Time Trial – Shane Charlton
- 2008
  - Junior Sprint – Callum Skinner
  - Junior Keirin – Kevin Stewart
- 2009
  - Junior Keirin – Kevin Stewart
  - Junior Sprint – Kevin Stewart
- 2010
  - Junior Sprint – John Paul
  - Junior 1 km Time Trial – Callum Skinner
- 2011
  - Junior Sprint – John Paul
  - Junior Keirin – John Paul

=== Masters ===
- 2001
  - Pursuit – Ivor Reid
  - Scratch Race – Ivor Reid
  - Sprint – Marco Librizzi
  - Sprint – Ivor Reid
- 2002
  - Sprint – Marco Librizzi
- 2003
  - Scratch Race – Derek Smith
  - Sprint – Marco Librizzi
  - Points Race – Derek Smith
  - 1 km Time Trial – Stefan Collins
  - Sprint – Stefan Collins
  - Scratch Race – Carol Scott
  - 500 m Time Trial – Carol Scott
- 2004
  - Women's 500 m Time Trial – Carol Scott
  - Women's Scratch Race – Carol Scott
  - Women's Points Race – Carol Scott
- 2005
  - Women's Points Race – Carol Scott
  - Women's Scratch Race – Carol Scott
  - Women's Sprint – Carol Scott
  - Women's 500 m Time Trial – Carol Scott
  - Women's Pursuit – Carol Scott
- 2006
  - Scratch Race – Anthony Stirrat
  - Points Race – Derek Smith
- 2008
  - 1 km Time Trial – Bruce Croall
  - Sprint – Bruce Croall
- 2009
  - 1 km Time Trial – Bruce Croall
  - Sprint – Bruce Croall
- 2010
  - Women's Sprint – Louise Haston
  - Women's 500 m Time Trial – Louise Haston
  - Women's Pursuit – Louise Haston
