= British National Keirin Championships =

British cycling national competition

The British National Keirin Championships are held annually as part of the British National Track Championships organised by British Cycling. The men's championship was inaugurated in 1983 and a women's championship was held for the first time in 2003.

== Men's Senior Race ==
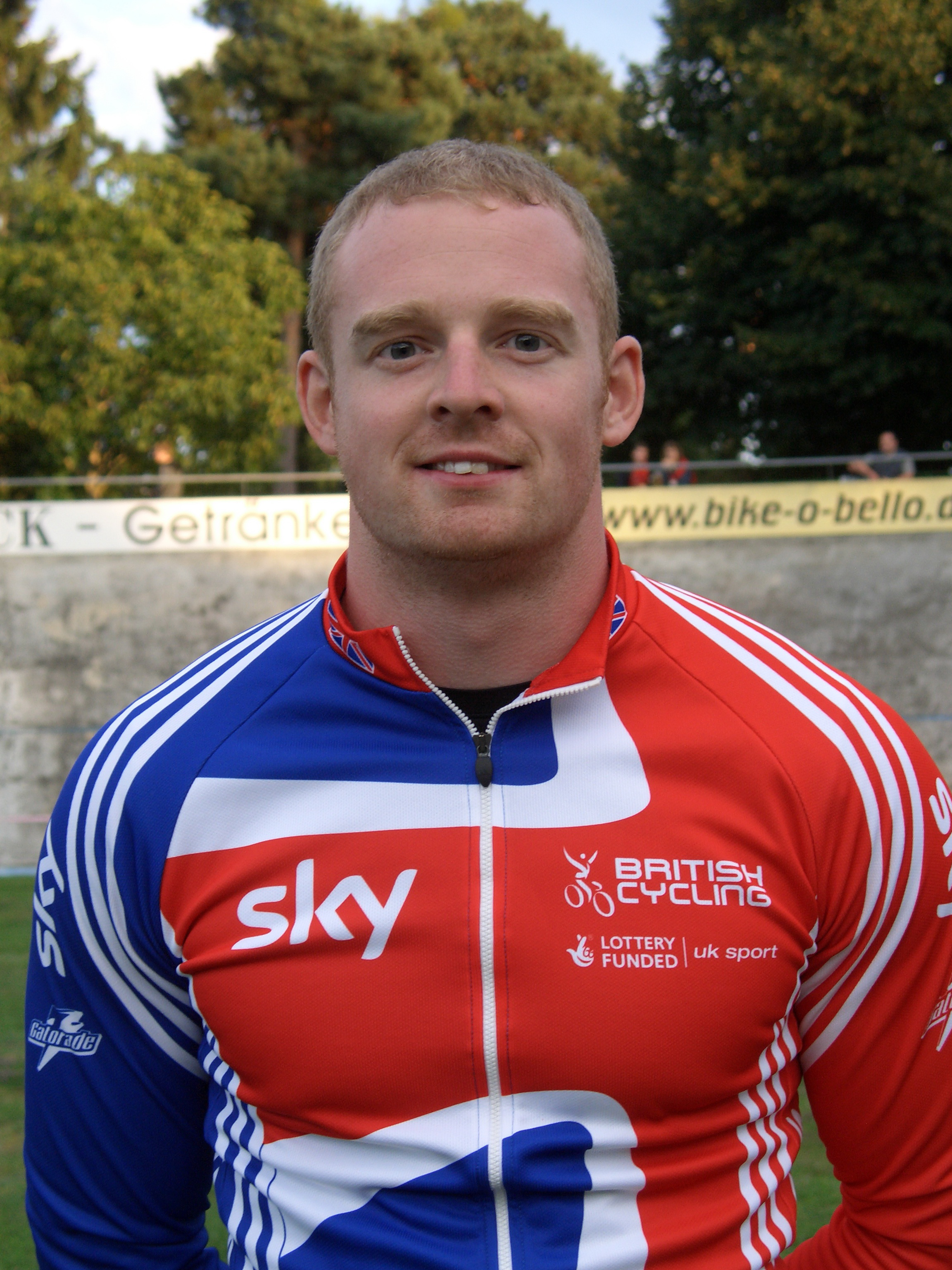
Matthew Crampton, five time winner

Year	Gold	Silver	Bronze	Ref
1983	Terry Tinsley			
1984	Terry Tinsley	Paul Swinnerton	Dave Le Grys	
1985	Terry Tinsley			
1986	Dennis Lightfoot			
1987	Dave Le Grys	Dave Miller	Russell Williams	
1988	Gary Sadler	Russell Williams	Dave Miller	
1989	Paul McHugh			
1990	Russell Williams	Paul McHugh	Colin Sturgess	
1991	Nick Barnes	Paul McHugh	Gary Coltman	
1992	Paul McHugh	Gary Coltman	Russell Williams	
1993	Stewart Brydon	Paul McHugh	Rob Jefferies	
1994	Paul McHugh	Peter Jacques	Marco Librizzi	
1995	Steve Paulding+			
1996	Peter Jacques	Craig MacLean		
1997	Peter Jacques	Rob Jefferies	Alwyn McMath	
1998	Craig Percival	Robert Darley	Richard Kennedy	
1999	Craig Percival	Neil Campbell	Mark Whittaker	
2000	Craig MacLean	Barney Storey	Alwyn McMath	
2001	Jon Norfolk	Barney Storey	Alwyn McMath	
2002	Jon Norfolk	James Taylor	Ben Elliott	
2003	Barney Storey	Matthew Haynes	Dave Heald	
2004	Ben Elliott	Matthew Haynes	James Taylor	
2005	Matthew Crampton	Dave Heald	Richard Kennedy	
2006	Ross Edgar	Matthew Crampton	Chris Hoy	
2007	Matthew Crampton	Ross Edgar	Chris Hoy	
2008	Matthew Crampton	Craig MacLean	Christian Lyte	
2009	Chris Hoy	Jason Kenny	Christian Lyte	
2010	Ross Edgar	Jason Kenny	Chris Pritchard	
2011	Chris Hoy	David Daniell	Philip Hindes	
2012	Matthew Crampton	Matt Rotherham	Craig MacLean	
2013	Jason Kenny	Matthew Crampton	Lewis Oliva	
2014	Callum Skinner	Matthew Crampton	Lewis Oliva	
2015	Matthew Crampton	Lewis Oliva	Thomas Rotherham	
2017	Lewis Oliva	Matt Rotherham	Thomas Rotherham	
2018	Lewis Oliva	Joseph Truman	Alex Jolliffe	
2019	Jason Kenny	Jack Carlin	Joseph Truman	
2020	Joseph Truman	Matthew Roper	Niall Monks	
2021 not held due to Covid-19
2022	Jack Carlin	Joseph Truman	Hamish Turnbull	
2023	Hamish Turnbull	Jack Carlin	Niall Monks	
2024	Hayden Norris	Niall Monks	Harvey McNaughton	
2025	Matt Richardson	Peter Mitchell	Hamish Turnbull	
2026	Matt Richardson	Hamish Turnball	William Munday	

+ winner following disqualification of Shawn Lynch

== Women's Senior Race ==
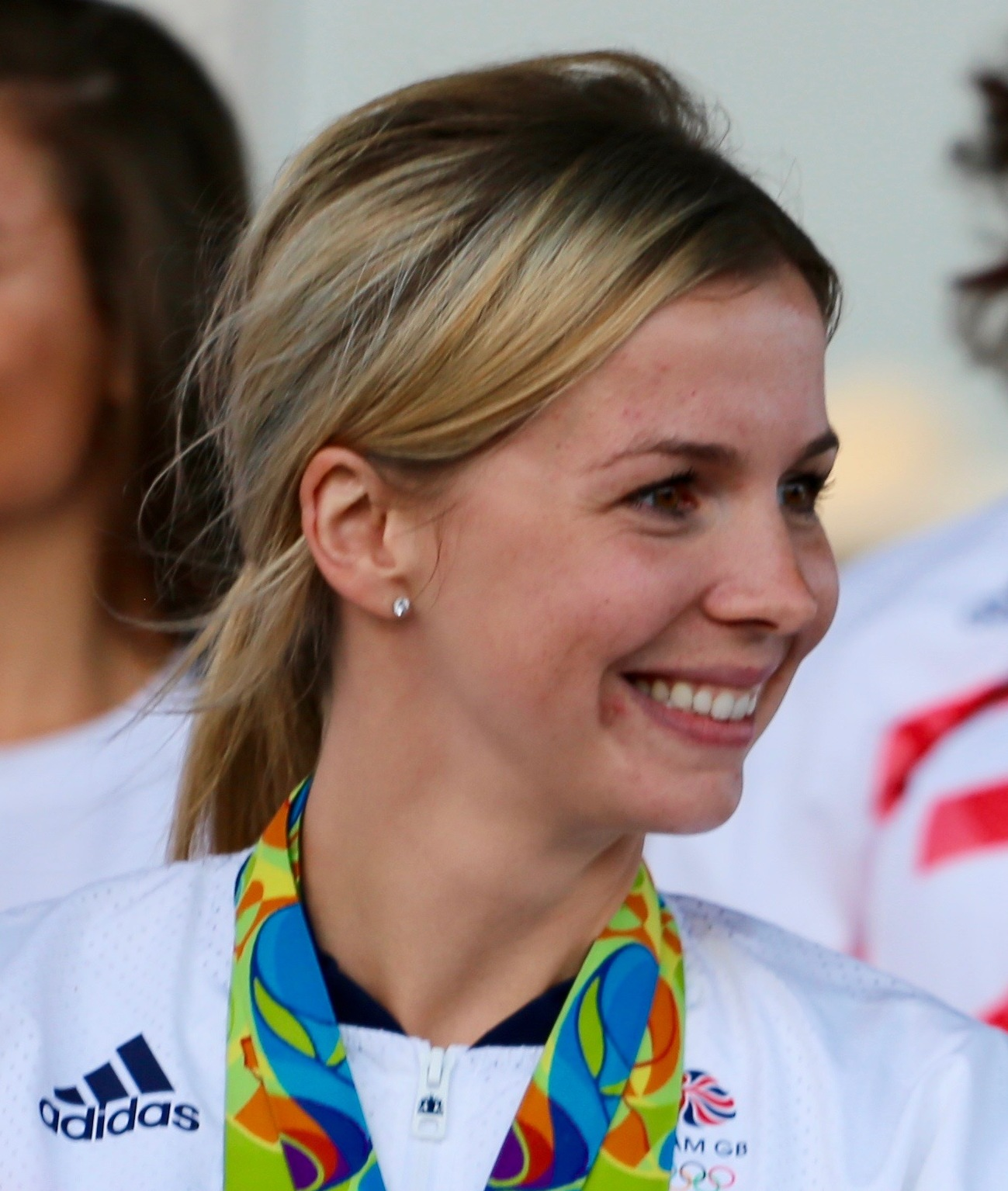
Becky James, winner in 2011 and 2012

Year	Gold	Silver	Bronze	Ref
1992	Sally Dawes			
1993	Sally Timmis			
2003	Victoria Pendleton	Denise Hampson	Wendy Everson	
2004	Joy Nixon	Jo Tindley	Rusine Airstone	
2005	Victoria Pendleton	Lucy Richards	Katie Curtis	
2006	Victoria Pendleton	Anna Blyth	Lucy Ayres	
2007	Victoria Pendleton	Anna Blyth	Helen Scott	
2008	Victoria Pendleton	Anna Blyth	Jess Varnish	
2009	Victoria Pendleton	Becky James	Helen Scott	
2010	Victoria Pendleton	Jessica Varnish	Helen Scott	
2011	Becky James	Jessica Crampton	Victoria Williamson	
2012	Becky James	Victoria Williamson	Charline Joiner	
2013	Jessica Varnish	Katy Marchant	Rachel James	
2014	Jessica Varnish	Dannielle Khan	Katy Marchant	
2015	Katy Marchant	Becky James	Jessica Varnish	
2017	Sophie Capewell	Katie Archibald	Neah Evans	
2018	Jessica Crampton	Lauren Bate	Sophie Capewell	
2019	Jessica Crampton	Ellie Coster	Joanna Smith	
2020	Lauren Bell	Emma Finucane	Ellie Coster	
2021 not held due to Covid-19
2022	Ellie Stone	Emma Finucane	Sophie Capewell	
2023	Emma Finucane	Katy Marchant	Sophie Capewell	
2024	Lauren Bell	Rhian Edmunds	Amy Cole	
2025	Lauren Bell	Emma Finucane	Rhian Edmunds	
2026	Emma Finucane	Lowri Thomas	Lauren Bell	

== Junior ==
Extended content

Men's Junior Race

Year	Gold	Silver	Bronze
Keirin
2004	Jak Kenton-Sraggan	Tom Smith	Joe Liversidge
2005	Jason Kenny	Michael Partridge	Kyle Tilley
2006	Peter Kennaugh	David Daniell	Christian Lyte
2007	Christian Lyte	David Daniell	Steven Hill
2008	Steven Hill	Kevin Stewart	Peter Mitchell
2009	Lewis Oliva	Kian Emadi	Kevin Stewart
2010	Kian Emadi	Lewis Oliva	Thomas Gregory
2011	Matthew Rotherham	John Paul	Thomas Baker
2012	Matthew Rotherham	Jack Hoyle	Cameron Howard
2013	Thomas Scammell	Leon Gledhill	Ryan Owens
2014	Joseph Truman	Max Nethell	Thomas Rotherham
2015	Joseph Truman	Thomas Rotherham	Alex Jolliffe
2016	Alex Jolliffe	Cameron Thomson	Hamish Turnbull
2017	Lewis Stewart	Christopher Heaton	Hamish Turnbull
