= British National Team Sprint Championships =

British cycling national competition

The British National Team Sprint Championships are held annually as part of the British National Track Championships organized by British Cycling. A women's championship was held for the first time in 2008.

== Past winners ==
=== Men ===
Year	Gold	Silver	Bronze	Ref
1993	City of Edinburgh RC; Steve Paulding, Marco Librizzi; Anthony Stirrat, Stewart Brydon			
1994	City of Edinburgh RC; Steve Paulding, Marco Librizzi; Scott McWilliam, Stewart Brydon	North Wirral Velo		
1995	City of Edinburgh RC; Chris Hoy, Peter Jacques, Steve Paulding	CC Lancashire; Peter Boyd, Gary Hibbert, Neil Campbell	TS Tameside; Simon Churton, Neil Potter, Alwyn McMath	
1996	City of Edinburgh RC; Chris Hoy, Peter Jacques, Craig MacLean	Harlow CC		
1997	City of Edinburgh RC; Chris Hoy, Peter Jacques, Craig MacLean	Glendene CC	CC Lancashire	
1998	City of Edinburgh RC; Chris Hoy, Peter Jacques, Craig MacLean	CC Cycles; Alan Crossland, Alwyn McMath, Matthew Fairclough	GB Racing; John Taylor, Alexander Sims, Peter Green	
1999	City of Edinburgh RC; Peter Jacques, Craig MacLean, James Taylor	VC St Raphael; Andy Slater, Mark Whittaker, David Heald	Composite; Brian Fudge, Mark Pearce, Robin Thompson	
2000	City of Edinburgh RC; Chris Hoy, Craig MacLean, James Taylor	VC St Raphael; Andy Slater, Neil Campbell, David Heald	CCA Dataphonics; Ross Edgar, David Heaven, Dave Le Grys	
2001	City of Edinburgh RC; Chris Hoy, James Taylor, Jason Queally	VC St Raphael; David Heald, Anton Quist, Barney Storey	CCA Dataphonics; Ross Edgar, Robin Thompson, Christian Lyte	
2002	Team Athena; Craig MacLean, Chris Hoy, Jason Queally	VC St Raphael A Anton Quist, Andy Slater, Barney Storey	City of Edinburgh RC; Matthew Haynes, Marco Librizzi, James Taylor	
2003	Team Athena; Chris Hoy, Craig MacLean, Jason Queally	Dataphonics RT; Ross Edgar, David Le Grys, Robin Thompson	City of Edinburgh RC; Matthew Haynes, Marco Librizzi, James Taylor	
2004	VC St Raphael; David Heald, Barney Storey, Ross Edgar	City of Edinburgh RC; Marco Librizzi, Graeme Steen, Matthew Haynes	Yasumitsu-Schlapp; Jay Hollingsworth, Ian Sharpe, Joby Ingram-Dodd	
2005	Sportcity Velo; Joshua Hargreaves, Matthew Crampton, Jason Kenny	VC St Raphael A Benedict Elliott, David Heald, Richard Storey	City of Edinburgh RC; Marco Librizzi, Shane Charlton, Graeme Steen	
2006	Composite A Chris Hoy, Craig MacLean, Jason Queally	Scienceinsport.com; Matthew Crampton, Jamie Staff, Ross Edgar	Composite D Jason Kenny, David Daniell, Dave Le Grys	
2007	Scotland; Chris Hoy, Marco Librizzi, Ross Edgar	North West Region; Jason Kenny, Christian Lyte, David Daniell	Yasumitsu Schlapp; Jonathan Norfolk, Gwyn Carless, Anthony Gill	
2008	Composite - GB teams David Daniell, Christian Lyte, Matthew Crampton	City of Edinburgh RC; Bruce Croall, Matthew Haynes, Kevin Stewart	Yasumitsu Schlapp; Anthony Gill, Dan Woolfenden, Gwyn Carless	
2009	SKY+HD; Jamie Staff, Chris Hoy & Ross Edgar	North West Region A Christian Lyte, David Daniell, Matthew Crampton	City of Edinburgh RC; Kevin Stewart, Matthew Haynes, Robert Croall	
2010	Sky Track Cycling; Chris Hoy, Jason Kenny, Ross Edgar & Matt Crampton	City of Edinburgh RC; John Paul, Callum Skinner, Kevin Stewart	Scienceinsport.com; Jody Cundy, Andrew Kelly, Dave Readle	
2011	North West Region A Jason Kenny, Jason Queally, Chris Hoy	North West Region B Ross Edgar, Peter Mitchell, David Daniell	North West Region C Kian Emadi, Philip Hindes, Liam Phillips	
2012	North West Region B David Daniell, Peter Mitchell, Lewis Oliva	City of Edinburgh RC; Bruce Croall, John Paul, Callum Skinner	North West Region A Matthew Crampton, Jody Cundy, Craig MacLean	
2013	North West Region A Matthew Crampton, Kian Emadi, Jason Kenny	North West Region B Philip Hindes, Matt Rotherham, Callum Skinner	Scotland; Jonathan Biggin, Bruce Croall, John Paul	
2014	North West Region; Philip Hindes, Jason Kenny, Callum Skinner	Sportcity Velo; Jack Payne, Matt Rotherham, Thomas Rotherham	Performance Cycle Coaching; Peter Mitchell, Ryan Owens, Thomas Scammell	
2015	North West Region A Jason Kenny, Matthew Crampton, Philip Hindes	Black Line; Peter Mitchell, Matt Roper, Tom Scammell	Sportcity Velo; Jack Payne, Matt Rotherham, Tom Rotherham	
2017	North West Region A Jack Carlin, Ryan Owens, Joseph Truman	Sportcity Velo; Joel Partington, Thomas Rotherham, Matt Rotherham	North West Region B Ryan Hutchinson, Alex Jolliffe, Lewis Oliva	
2018	North West Region A & SES Racing; Jack Carlin, Jason Kenny, Ryan Owens	Sportcity Velo; Joel Partington, Thomas Rotherham, Matt Rotherham	North West Region B Alex Jolliffe, Lewis Stewart, Hamish Turnbull	
2019	Team Inspired & SES Racing; Jack Carlin, Jason Kenny, Philip Hindes, Ryan Owens	Slingshot; Alistair Fielding, Lewis Stewart, Hamish Turnbull	Black Line; Peter Mitchell, Niall Monks, Matthew Roper, Alex Spratt	
2020	Team Inspired; Joseph Truman, Jack Carlin, Ryan Owens	Slingshot; Hamish Turnbull, Alistair Fielding, James Bunting	Black Line; Harry Ledingham-Horn, Hayden Norris, Ed Lowe	
2021 not held due to Covid-19
2022	Team Inspired; Jack Carlin; Alistair Fielding; Joseph Truman; Hamish Turnbull	Team East Midlands; James Bunting; Marcus Hiley; Harry Ledingham-Horn; Hayden Norris	Glasgow Track RC; Luthais Arthur; Niall Monks; Anthony Young	
2023	Team Inspired; Marcus Hiley; Harry Ledingham-Horn; Ed Lowe	North West; Oliver Aloul; James Bunting; Hayden Norris; Matt Rotherham	Glasgow Track RC; Luthais Arthur; Niall Monks; Lyall Craig	
2024	Team Inspired A Ed Lowe; Hayden Norris; Harry Ledingham-Horn	Team Inspired B Marcus Hiley; Harry Radford; Joe Truman	ESV Manchester; Oliver Aloul; Tom Morrissey; Matt Rotherham	
2025	Team Inspired/GTRC; Lyall Craig; Harry Ledingham-Horn; Niall Monks; Matthew Richardson	Team Inspired B Marcus Hiley; Ed Lowe; Oliver Pettifer	Team Inspired A Alistair Fielding; Hayden Norris; Harry Radford; Hamish Turnbull	
2026	Team Inspired A Marcus Hiley; Harry Radford; Matt Richardson	Team Inspired B Ed Lowe; Hayden Norris; Hamish Turnball	Team Inspired C Lyall Craig; Archie Gill; Joseph Truman; Oliver Pettifer	

=== Women ===
Year	Gold	Silver	Bronze	Ref
2008	Composite - GB teams Anna Blyth & Victoria Pendleton	Halesowen A & CC; Helen Scott & Jess Varnish	City of Edinburgh RC; Charline Joiner & Jenny Davis	
2009	Halesowen A & CC; Helen Scott & Jess Varnish	City of Edinburgh RC; Jenny Davis & Charline Joiner 36.174	XRT - www.elmycycles.co.uk Janet Birkmyre & Cassie Gledhill	
2010	Halesowen ACC & North West Region; Jess Varnish &Becky James	City of Edinburgh RC "A"; Jenny Davis & Charline Joiner	City of Edinburgh RC; Emma Baird & Kayleigh Brogan	
2011	North West Region; Victoria Pendleton & Jess Varnish	City of Edinburgh RC; Kayleigh Brogan & Jenny Davis	XRT Elmy Cycles; Janet Birkmyre & Cassie Gledhill	
2012	Abergavenny RC; Rachel James & Becky James	Edinburgh RC; Eleanor Richardson & Lauryn Therin	Sport City Velo; Megan Boyd & Jessica Crampton	
2013	West Midlands Region; Dannielle Khan & Jess Varnish	Eastern Region; Katy Marchant & Victoria Williamson	Wales; Ellie Coster & Rachel James	
2014	West Midlands Region; Dannielle Khan & Jess Varnish	Eastern Region; Katy Marchant & Victoria Williamson	North West Region; Rachel James & Helen Scott	
2015	North West Region C Katy Marchant & Jessica Varnish	North West Region B Shanaze Reade & Victoria Williamson	North West Region D Eleanor Richardson & Helen Scott	
2017	Team Terminator; Lauren Bate & Sophie Capewell	Glasgow Wheelers & Peebles CC; Emma Baird & Lucy Grant	Wolverhampton & Mid Shropshire Wheelers; Georgia Hilleard & Esme Niblett	
2018	Team Terminator & Wolverhampton Wheelers; Lauren Bate & Georgia Hilleard	Glasgow Wheelers & Peebles CC; Lusia Steele & Lucy Grant	Team Terminator & Peckham Challengers; Sophie Capewell & Blaine Ridge-Davis	
2019	North West Region; Shanaze Reade & Blaine Ridge-Davis	Team Terminator; Sophie Capewell & Milly Tanner	Black Line; Lusia Steele & Victoria Williamson	
2020	Slingshot; Blaine Ridge-Davis & Milly Tanner	Scotland B Lucy Grant & Lusia Steele	Scotland A Lauren Bell & Ellie Stone	
2021 not held due to Covid-19
2022	Team Wales; Rhian Edmunds; Emma Finucane; Lowri Thomas	Team Breeze; Sophie Capewell; Blaine Ridge-Davis; Millicent Tanner	Team Scotland; Lauren Bell; Iona Moir; Lusia Steele; Ellie Stone	
2023	Team Inspired B Katy Marchant; Emma Finucane; Milly Tanner	Team Inspired A Sophie Capewell; Blaine Ridge-Davis; Lowri Thomas	Scotland; Lauren Bell; Iona Moir; Ellie Stone	
2024	Team Inspired A Georgette Rand; Milly Tanner; Sophie Capewell	Team Inspired B Rhian Edmunds; Iona Moir; Rhianna Parris-Smith	PD Scotland; Lucy Grant; Kirsty Johnson; Christina Smith	
2025	Team Inspired A Lauren Bell; Rhian Edmunds; Lowri Thomas	Team Inspired B Iona Moir; Rhianna Parris-Smith; Georgette Rand	Team Wales; Amy Cole; Bronwen Howard-Rees; Eve James; Evelyn Tedaldi	
2026	Team Inspired A Lowri Thomas; Rhianna Parris-Smith; Emma Finucane; Lauren Bell	Team Inspired B Rhian Edmunds; Iona Moir; Georgette Rand	Glasgow Track Racing; Madeleine Silcock; Ellie Stone; Sylvia Mizstal; Sarah Johnson	

== See also ==
- British Cycling National Track Championships
