= 1996 British National Track Championships =

- Venue: Manchester, England
- Dates: 24–28 May 1996 and 12–15 September 1996
- Velodrome: Manchester Velodrome

The 1996 British National Track Championships were a series of track cycling competitions held from 24 to 28 May 1996 and 12–15 September 1996, at the Manchester Velodrome. The Championships were organised by the British Cycling Federation.

== Medal summary ==
=== Men's Events ===
Event	Gold	Silver	Bronze
1 km Time Trial	Shaun Wallace	Jason Queally	Craig MacLean
Sprint	Craig Percival	Craig MacLean	Peter Jacques
Keirin	Peter Jacques	Craig MacLean	
Team sprint	City of Edinburgh RC; Chris Hoy; Peter Jacques; Craig MacLean	Harlow CC	
Individual Pursuit	Graeme Obree	Rob Hayles	Shaun Wallace
Team pursuit	Harlow CC; Chris Ball; Matt Illingworth; James Taylor; Shaun Wallace	City of Edinburgh; Chris Hoy; Graeme Herd; Nicholas Hall; Martin Williamson; Craig MacLean; Neil Walker	Gill Airways, Peugeot
Points	Rob Hayles	Russell Williams	Phil West
Scratch	Shaun Wallace	Bryan Steel	Jonathan Hargreaves
Madison	Bryan Steel; Simon Lillistone	Rob Hayles; Russell Williams	Jon Clay; Phil West
Derny (held at Herne Hill Velodrome)	Paul Curran; Noel Worby	Russell Williams; Colin Denman	Keith Reid; Derek Marloe

=== Women's Events ===
Event	Gold	Silver	Bronze
500m time trial	Wendy Everson	Megan Hughes	Emma Davies
Sprint	Wendy Everson	Megan Hughes	
Individual Pursuit	Yvonne McGregor	Maxine Johnson	Vikki Filsell
Points	Sally Boyden	Wendy Everson	Angela Hunter
Scratch	Sally Boyden	Megan Hughes	Michelle Ward
