= 1994 British National Track Championships =

- Venue: Leicester, England
- Date(s): 24–30 July 1994
- Velodrome: Leicester Velodrome

The 1994 British National Track Championships were a series of track cycling competitions held from 24–30 July 1994 at the Leicester Velodrome. The Championships were organised by the British Cycling Federation.

It would be the last championships held at the Leicester Velodrome because a new National Cycling Centre in Manchester which included the Manchester Velodrome had been opened by Princess Anne on 14 September 1994. British Cycling would also move their headquarters to the National Cycling Centre, Manchester, in November 1994.

== Medal summary ==
=== Men's Events ===
Event	Gold	Silver	Bronze
1 Km Time Trial	Rob Hayles	Glen Sword	Richard Prince
Sprint	Stewart Brydon	Gary Hibbert	Craig Percival
Keirin	Paul McHugh	Peter Jacques	Marco Librizzi
Team sprint	City of Edinburgh; Steve Paulding; Marco Librizzi; Scott McWilliam; Stewart Brydon	North Wirral Velo	
Individual Pursuit	Graeme Obree	Bryan Steel	Stuart Dangerfield
Team pursuit	North Wirral Velo; Stuart Dangerfield; Simon Lillistone; Matt Illingworth; Glen Sword	Team Haverhill; Adrian Allen; Christopher Ball; Rob Hayles; Bryan Steel	City of Edinburgh; Jamie Henderson; Graeme Herd; Scott McWilliam; Martin Williamson
Points	Simon Lillistone	Tony Doyle	Anthony Stirrat
Scratch	Anthony Stirrat	Gary Coltman	Russell Williams
Madison	Bryan Steel; Rob Hayles	Simon Lillistone; Paul Jennings	Paul Curran; Chris Newton
Omnium	Antony Wallis	Gary Coltman	Russell Williams
Tandem	Clayton Velo; Peter Boyd; Gary Hibbert	Leo RC & Stoke AC; L Rowe; Martin Phillips	City of Edinburgh; Marco Librizzi; Steve Paulding
Derny (held at Herne Hill Velodrome)	Paul Curran; Howard Broughton	Spencer Wingrave; Paul Wingrave	Russell Williams; Colin Denman

=== Women's Events ===
Event	Gold	Silver	Bronze
1 Km time trial	Maxine Johnson	Rachelle Jones	Sally Dawes
Sprint	Wendy Everson	Sally Boyden	Lynn Minchinton
Individual Pursuit	Yvonne McGregor	Sally Dawes	Maxine Johnson
Points	Sally Hodge	Sally Dawes	Maria Lawrence
