= 1991 British National Track Championships =

- Venue: Leicester, England
- Date(s): 26 July – 3 August 1991
- Velodrome: Leicester Velodrome

The 1991 British National Track Championships were a series of track cycling competitions held from 26 July – 3 August 1991 at the Leicester Velodrome.

== Medal summary ==
=== Men's Events ===
Event	Gold	Silver	Bronze
1 Km Time Trial	Glen Sword	Anthony Stirrat	Steve Paulding
Amateur Sprint	Stewart Brydon	Eddie Alexander	Steve Paulding
Professional Sprint	Paul McHugh	Gary Coltman	Russell Williams
Professional Keirin	Nick Barnes	Paul McHugh	Gary Coltman
Professional 5,000 Individual Pursuit	Colin Sturgess	Jon Walshaw	Gary Coltman
Amateur 4,000 Individual Pursuit	Chris Boardman	Simon Lillistone	Bryan Steel
Team pursuit	Manchester Wheelers; Chris Boardman; Glen Sword; Scott O'Brien; Richard Hughes	Team Haverhill	VC St Raphael; Paul Jennings; Andy Forbes
Amateur 50Km Points	Simon Lillistone	Ray Hughes	Darryl Webster
Amateur 20Km Scratch	Glen Sword	Antony Wallis	Steve Clark
Madison	Gary Coltman; Jon Walshaw	Ray Hughes; Simon Lillistone	Bryan Steel; Colin Sturgess
Preofessional Omnium	Gary Coltman	Jon Walshaw	Russell Williams
Amateur Tandem	Clayton Velo/Sportif Tameside; Peter Boyd; Gary Hibbert	Dinnington/Wolverhampton; Mark Barry; Martin Phillips	Ellan Vannin/Kirkby; Adrian Mooney; John Saysell
50 Km Derny	Bryan Taylor; Paul Wingrave	John Dale; Clive Murden	Peter Kennedy

=== Women's Events ===
Event	Gold	Silver	Bronze
1 Km time trial	Louise Jones	Maxine Johnson	
Sprint	Louise Jones	Claire Rushworth	Wendy Everson
Individual Pursuit	Sally Dawes	Louise Jones	Mandy Jones
30Km Points	Sally Hodge	Louise Jones	Sally Dawes
