= 1988 British National Track Championships =

- Venue: Leicester, England
- Date(s): 29 July – 7 August 1988
- Velodrome: Leicester Velodrome

The 1988 British National Track Championships were a series of track cycling competitions held from 29 July – 7 August 1988 at the Leicester Velodrome.

== Medal summary ==
=== Men's Events ===
Event	Gold	Silver	Bronze
Amateur Kilo	Gary Neiwand (Aus)	Eddie Alexander	Paul McHugh
Amateur Sprint	Eddie Alexander	Stewart Brydon	Paul McHugh
Professional Sprint	Gary Sadler	Gary Coltman	Russell Williams
Professional Individual Pursuit	Tony Doyle	Jon Walshaw	Darryl Webster
Amateur Individual Pursuit	Colin Sturgess	Chris Boardman	
Team pursuit	Manchester Wheelers	Dinnington RC	Team Haverhill
Amateur Points	Colin Sturgess	Simon Lillistone	Paul Curran
Madison	Robert Coull & Alastair Wood	Bruce Drew & Guy Rowland	Dave Baker & Martin Perrett
Professional Omnium	Jon Walshaw	Phil Thomas	Dave Miller
Professional Keirin	Gary Sadler	Russell Williams	Dave Miller
Amateur Tandem	Eddie Alexander & Stewart Brydon	Michael Borman & Chris Pyatt	Michael Garratt & Gary Hibbert
Derny	Nick Lett & Paul Wingrave	Nigel Brown & Jack Collins	John Dale & Clive Murden

=== Women's Events ===
Event	Gold	Silver	Bronze
Time Trial	Sally Hodge		
Sprint	Louise Jones	Jackie Harris	
Individual Pursuit	Sally Hodge	Carole Langley	Elaine Ward or Sarah Springman
Points	Sally Hodge	Carole Langley	Jackie Harris
