= 1987 British National Track Championships =

- Venue: Leicester, England
- Date(s): 31 July – 9 August 1987
- Velodrome: Leicester Velodrome

The 1987 British National Track Championships were a series of track cycling competitions held from 31 July – 9 August 1987 at the Leicester Velodrome.

== Medal summary ==
=== Men's Events ===
Event	Gold	Silver	Bronze
Amateur Kilo TT	Eddie Alexander	Colin Sturgess	Steve Paulding
Amateur Sprint	Eddie Alexander	Paul McHugh	Stewart Brydon
Professional Sprint	Dave Le Grys	Russell Williams	Dave Miller
Professional Individual Pursuit	Tony Doyle	Sean Yates	Adrian Timmis
Amateur Individual Pursuit	Colin Sturgess	Jon Walshaw	Chris Boardman
Team pursuit	Manchester Wheelers	Team Haverhill	Dinnington RC
Amateur Points	Alastair Wood	Paul Curran	
Amateur 20 km Scratch	Alastair Wood	Bruce Drew	Paul Wain
Madison	Robert Coull & Alastair Wood	Paul Wain & Adrian Adgar	John Clarke & Peter Dickason
Professional Omnium	Dave Miller	Russell Williams	Rob Muzio
Professional Keirin	Dave Le Grys	Dave Miller	Russell Williams
Amateur Tandem	Eddie Alexander & Stewart Brydon	Michael Borman & Chris Pyatt	Dave Marsh & Brian Fudge
Derny	Nigel Brown & Jack Collins	Nick Lett & Paul Wingrave	John Dale & Clive Murden

=== Women's Events ===
Event	Gold	Silver	Bronze
Time Trial	Sally Hodge	Louise Jones	Carole Langley
Sprint	Louise Jones	Jackie Harris	Alison Pockett
Individual Pursuit	Sally Hodge	Lisa Brambani	Barbara Collins
15km Points	Sally Hodge	Louise Jones	Jackie Harris
