= 1990 British National Track Championships =

- Venue: Leicester, England
- Date(s): 27 July – 4 August 1990
- Velodrome: Leicester Velodrome

The 1990 British National Track Championships were a series of track cycling competitions held from 27 July – 4 August 1990 at the Leicester Velodrome.

== Medal summary ==
=== Men's Events ===
Event	Gold	Silver	Bronze
Amateur 1 km Time Trial	Steve Paulding	Adrian Hawkins	Eddie Alexander
Amateur Sprint	Stewart Brydon	Steve Paulding	Anthony Stirrat
Professional Sprint	Paul McHugh	Gary Coltman	Alastair Wood
Professional 5,000 Individual Pursuit	Colin Sturgess	Gary Coltman	Jon Walshaw
Amateur 4,000 Individual Pursuit	Simon Lillistone	Chris Boardman	Bryan Steel or Matt Illingworth
Team pursuit	Team Haverhill	Olympia Sport	Leicestershire RC; Phil Rayner; Martin Webster; Martin Ludlam; Colin Griffiths
Amateur 50 km Points	Simon Lillistone	Spencer Wingrave	Jeff Snodin
Amateur 20 km Scratch	Jeff Snodin	Guy Rowlands	Neil Crossthwaite
Madison	Gary Coltman; Jon Walshaw		
Professional Omnium	Gary Coltman	Jon Walshaw	Colin Sturgess
Professional Keirin	Russell Williams	Paul McHugh	Colin Sturgess
Amateur Tandem	Peter Boyd; Gary Hibbert	Chris Pyatt; Martin Phillips	Eddie Alexander; Chris Ransome
50 km Derny	Nick Lett; Paul Wingrave	John Dale; Clive Murden	Adrian Krakiewicz

=== Women's Events ===
Event	Gold	Silver	Bronze
1 km time trial	Louise Jones	Maxine Johnson	Sally Dawes
Sprint	Louise Jones	Claire Rushworth	
Individual Pursuit	Sally Dawes	Maxine Johnson	Sue Wright
Points	Sally Dawes	Sharon Beech	Maxine Johnson
