= 1993 British National Track Championships =

- Venue: Leicester, England
- Date(s): 24–31 July 1993
- Velodrome: Leicester Velodrome

The 1993 British National Track Championships were a series of track cycling competitions held from 24–31 July 1993 at the Leicester Velodrome. The Championships were organised by the British Cycling Federation and for the first time in its history became 'Open', meaning professional and amateur cyclists competed in the same event.

== Medal summary ==
=== Men's Events ===
Event	Gold	Silver	Bronze
1 Km Time Trial	Rob Hayles	Anthony Stirrat	Steve Paulding
Sprint	Stewart Brydon	Gary Hibbert	Paul McHugh
Keirin	Stewart Brydon	Paul McHugh	Robert Jefferies
Team sprint	City of Edinburgh RC; Steve Paulding; Marco Librizzi; Anthony Stirrat; Stewart Brydon		
Individual Pursuit	Graeme Obree	Bryan Steel	Stuart Dangerfield
Team pursuit	North Wirral Velo Club; Chris Boardman; Jon Walshaw; Paul Jennings; Matt Illingworth	Team Haverhill; Adrian Allen; Andy Forbes; Rob Hayles; Bryan Steel	Dinnington RC; Tony Doyle; Paul Curran; Matthew Charity; Spencer Wingrave
Points	Simon Lillistone	Spencer Wingrave	Richard Craven
Scratch	Chris Newton		
Madison	Spencer Wingrave; Tony Doyle	Simon Lillistone; Jon Walshaw	Hugh Cameron; Russell Williams
Omnium	Gary Coltman	Anthony Stirrat	Russell Williams
Tandem	Clayton Velo; Peter Boyd; Gary Hibbert	City of Edinburgh/Wembley RC; Marco Librizzi; John Saysell	Stoke AC; Chris Pyatt; Martin Phillips
Derny	Paul Curran; Howard Broughton	Paul Wingrave; Spencer Wingrave	Paul Gerrard; Noel Worby

=== Women's Events ===
Event	Gold	Silver	Bronze
1 Km time trial	Sally Timmis	Sally Boyden	Maxine Johnson
Sprint	Sally Boyden	Gill Danson	Isla Rowntree
Individual Pursuit	Sally Timmis	Sarah Phillips	Maxine Johnson
Keirin	Sally Timmis		
Points	Sally Hodge	Maxine Johnson	Sally Timmis
