= 1989 British National Track Championships =

- Venue: Leicester, England
- Date(s): 31 July – 6 August 1989
- Velodrome: Saffron Lane Velodrome, Leicester

The 1989 British National Track Championships were a series of track cycling competitions held from 31 July – 6 August 1989 at the Saffron Lane Velodrome in Leicester. They were organised by the British Cycling Federation.

== Medal summary ==
=== Men's Events ===
Event	Gold	Silver	Bronze
Professional 1 Km Time trial	Paul McHugh	Gary Coltman	Russell Williams
Amateur 1 Km Time trial	Steve Paulding	Stewart Brydon	Adrian Hawkins
Amateur 1km Sprint	Stewart Brydon	Eddie Alexander	Steve Paulding
Professional 5,000m Pursuit	Colin Sturgess	Paul Curran	Jon Walshaw
Amateur 4,000m Individual Pursuit	Chris Boardman	Bryan Steel	Glen Sword
Team pursuit	Manchester Wheelers; Chris Boardman; Scott O'Brien; Glen Sword; Tim Warriner	Team Haverhill; Simon Lillistone; Spencer Wingrave; Bryan Steel; Paul Penton	Zenith CC; Martin Perrett; Jeff Giddings; Paul Carpenter; Adam Wykes
50km Points race	Simon Lillistone	Scott O'Brien	Spencer Wingrave
Tandem	Peter Boyd; Gary Hibbert	Michael Borman; Chris Pyatt	
Omnium	Gary Coltman		
Keirin	Paul McHugh		
Derny	Nick Lett; Paul Wingrave	John Dale; Clive Murden	Levon Pegg
Madison (held at Reading)	Gary Coltman; Russell Williams		

=== Women's Events ===
Event	Gold	Silver	Bronze
Sprint	Louise Jones	Claire Rushworth	
3,000m Individual Pursuit	Sally McKenzie-Hodge	Maxine Johnson	Sally Dawes
15km Points race	Louise Jones	Maxine Johnson	Sally McKenzie-Hodge
