= 1995 British National Track Championships =

- Venue: Manchester, England
- Date(s): 29 July – 5 August 1995
- Velodrome: Manchester Velodrome

The 1995 British National Track Championships were a series of track cycling competitions held from 29 July – 5 August 1995 at the Manchester Velodrome. The Championships were organised by the British Cycling Federation. It was the first championships held at the new Manchester Velodrome following British Cycling moving their headquarters to the National Cycling Centre, Manchester, in November 1994.

Steve Paulding was subsequently awarded the Keirin title after Shawn Lynch was stripped of the title following a positive drugs test at an event in Leicester during June.

== Medal summary ==
=== Men's Events ===
Event	Gold	Silver	Bronze
1 Km Time Trial	Shaun Wallace	Rob Hayles	Anthony Stirrat
Sprint	Steve Paulding	Neil Potter	Anthony Stirrat
Keirin	Steve Paulding		
Team sprint	City of Edinburgh RC; Chris Hoy; Peter Jacques; Steve Paulding	CC Lancashire; Peter Boyd; Gary Hibbert; Neil Campbell	TS Tameside; Simon Churton; Neil Potter; Alwyn McMath
Individual Pursuit	Graeme Obree	Bryan Steel	Rob Hayles
Team pursuit	North Wirral Velo; Simon Lillistone; Chris Newton; Paul Jennings; Julian Ramsbottom	City of Edinburgh; Jamie Henderson; Graeme Herd; Nicky Hall; Martin Williamson	De Laurie CC; Justin Clarke; Dominic Cooper; Daniel Rudd; Stuart Shand
Points	Jon Clay	Bryan Steel	Anthony Stirrat
Scratch	Chris Newton	Anthony Stirrat	Bryan Steel
Madison	Rob Hayles; Russell Williams	Bryan Steel; Spencer Wingrave	Simon Lillistone; Chris Newton
Omnium	Rob Hayles	Anthony Stirrat	Nicholas Hall
Tandem	CC Lancashire; Peter Boyd; Gary Hibbert	Leo RC & Stoke AC; L Rowe; Martin Phillips	Newark Castle/Chesterfield; Richard Kennedy; Graham Hobson
Derny (held at Herne Hill Velodrome)	Paul Curran; Howard Broughton	Spencer Wingrave; Paul Wingrave	Norman Dunroy; Noel Worby

=== Women's Events ===
Event	Gold	Silver	Bronze
800m time trial	Wendy Everson	Megan Hughes	Sally Boyden
Sprint	Wendy Everson	Sally Boyden	Emma Davies
Individual Pursuit	Yvonne McGregor	Maxine Johnson	Vikki Filsell
Points	Sally Boyden	Maria Lawrence	Vikki Filsell
Scratch	Wendy Everson		
