= 2004 British National Track Championships =

- Venue: Manchester, England
- Date(s): 7–10 October 2004
- Velodrome: Manchester Velodrome

The 2004 British National Track Championships were a series of track cycling competitions held from 7–10 October 2004 at the Manchester Velodrome.

== Medal summary ==
=== Men's Events ===
Event	Gold	Silver	Bronze
1 Km Time Trial	Matthew Haynes	Barney Storey	Neil Potter
Sprint	Matthew Crampton	Jak Kenton-Spraggen	Jason Kenny
Keirin	Ben Elliott	Matthew Haynes	James Taylor
Team sprint	David Heald; Barney Storey; Ross Edgar	Marco Librizzi; Graeme Steen; Matthew Haynes	Jay Hollingsworth; Ian Sharpe; Joby Ingram-Dodd
Individual Pursuit	Paul Manning	Rob Hayles	Kristian House
Team pursuit	Chris Newton; Paul Manning; Tom White; Mark Cavendish	Rob Hayles; Steve Cummings; Ed Clancy; Matt Brammeier	Tom Walters; Ben Swift; Jon Mosley; Ian Stannard
Points	Chris Newton	Keiran Page	Dean Downing
Scratch	Chris Newton	Tony Gibb	Russell Downing

=== Women's Events ===
Event	Gold	Silver	Bronze
500m time trial	Victoria Pendleton	Kate Cullen	Katrina Hair
Sprint	Victoria Pendleton	Kate Cullen	Claire Gross
Keirin	Joy Nixon	Jo Tindley	Rusine Airstone
Individual Pursuit	Emma Davies	Katrina Hair	Lorna Webb
Points	Emma Davies	Katie Cullen	Rachel Heal
Scratch	Katrina Hair	Kate Cullen	Jaqui Marshall
