= 1986 British National Track Championships =

- Venue: Leicester, England
- Date(s): 1–10 August 1986
- Velodrome: Leicester Velodrome

The 1986 British National Track Championships were a series of track cycling competitions held from 1–10 August 1986 at the Leicester Velodrome.

== Medal summary ==
=== Men's Events ===
Event	Gold	Silver	Bronze
Amateur Time Trial	Gary Coltman	Guy Rowland	R Bryant
Amateur Sprint	Paul McHugh	Stewart Brydon	Dave Marsh
Professional Sprint	Dave Le Grys	Dave Miller	Mark Walsham
Professional Individual Pursuit	Tony Doyle	Peter Sanders	Ian Fagan
Amateur Individual Pursuit	Rob Muzio	Darryl Webster	Glen Sword
Team pursuit	Manchester Wheelers	Team Haverhill	Dinnington RC
Amateur Points			
Amateur 20 Km Scratch	Steve Paulding		
Madison	Kevin Buyers & Russell Williams	Rob Muzio & Terry Taylor	Guy Rowland & Alastair Wood
Professional Omnium	Glen Mitchell	Ian Fagan	Dave Miller
Professional Keirin	Dennis Lightfoot		
Amateur Tandem	Michael Borman & Chris Pyatt	Steve Paulding & Stewart Brydon	Rob Mitchell & John Saysell
Derny	Nick Lett & Paul Wingrave	Des Fretwell & Howard Broughton	George Dixon & Jack Collins

=== Women's Events ===
Event	Gold	Silver	Bronze
Sprint	Louise Jones	Sally Hodge	Natalie Soens
Individual Pursuit	Theresa Dark	Lisa Brambani	
15km Points			
