= Chris Newton =

English cyclist (born 1973)

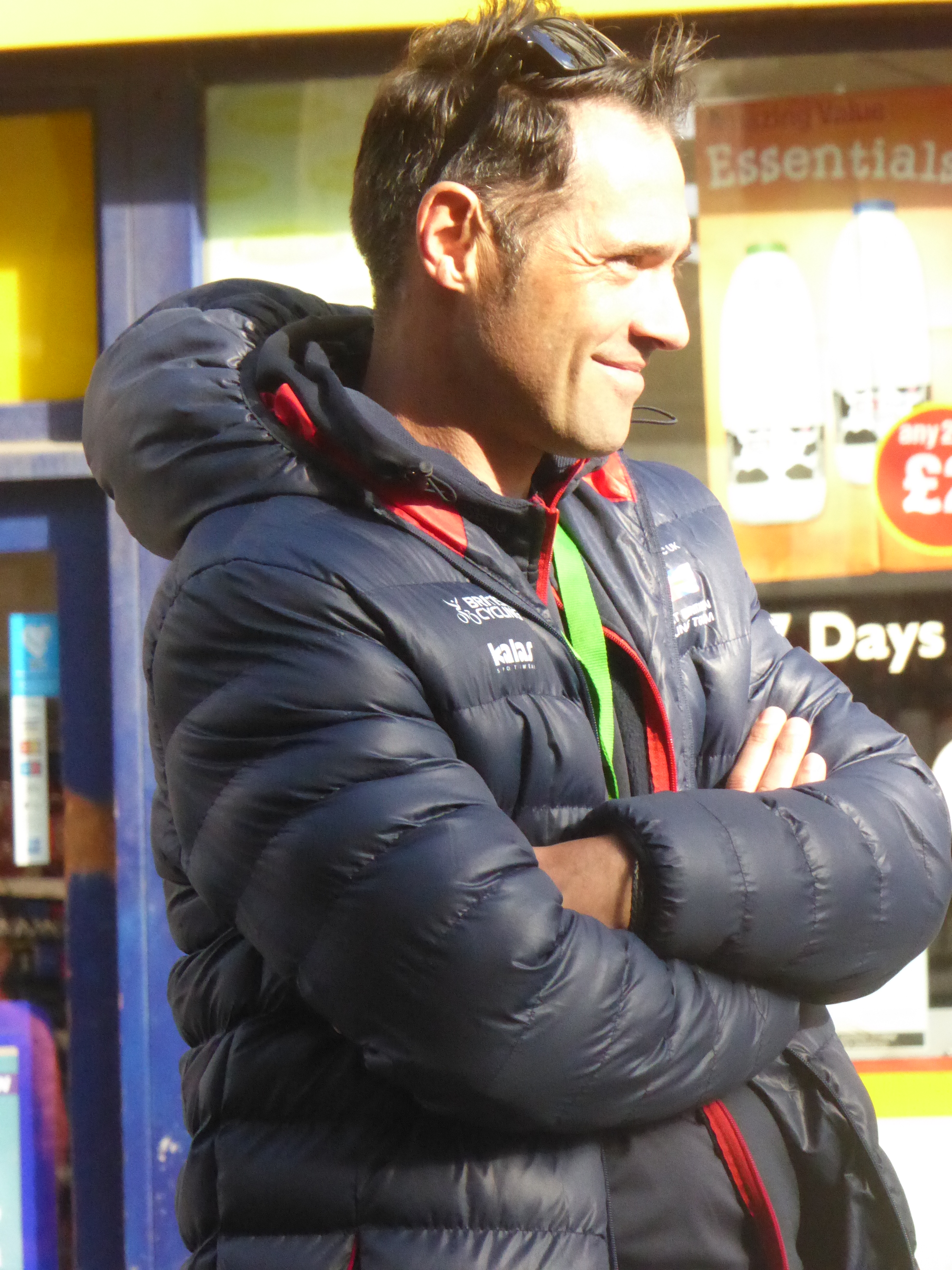
- Newton in 2019

Personal information
- Full name: Christopher Newton
- Born: 29 September 1973 (age 53) Middlesbrough, England
- Height: 1.81 m (5 ft 11 in)
- Weight: 69 kg (152 lb)

Cycling career
- Sport: Cycling
- Current team: British Cycling
- Disciplines: Track; Road
- Role: Rider (retired); Directeur sportif; Coach

Amateur teams
- 1995–1996: North Wirral Velo/Kodak
- 2000: Middridge CRT
- 2002–2003: Compensation Group
- 2003: Bendigo Building Industry

Professional teams
- 1998: Team Brite
- 1999: Linda McCartney Racing Team
- 2005–2010: Recycling.co.uk–MG X-Power

Managerial team
- 2012–: British Cycling
Medal record
Men's track cycling
Representing Great Britain
Olympic Games
Silver medal – second place	2004 Athens	Team pursuit
Bronze medal – third place	2000 Sydney	Team pursuit
Bronze medal – third place	2008 Beijing	Points race
World Championships
Gold medal – first place	2002 Ballerup	Points race
Gold medal – first place	2005 Los Angeles	Team pursuit
Silver medal – second place	2000 Manchester	Team pursuit
Silver medal – second place	2001 Antwerp	Team pursuit
Silver medal – second place	2002 Ballerup	Team pursuit
Silver medal – second place	2004 Melbourne	Team pursuit
Bronze medal – third place	2009 Pruszków	Points race
Representing England
Commonwealth Games
Silver medal – second place	1994 Victoria	Team pursuit
Silver medal – second place	2002 Manchester	Team pursuit
Bronze medal – third place	2002 Manchester	Points race

Christopher Malcolm Newton (born 29 September 1973) is an English former road and track racing cyclist. During his career, Newton won three Olympic medals (one silver, two bronze), seven UCI Track Cycling World Championships medals – including two world titles – and three Commonwealth Games medals. Since retiring as a rider, Newton has worked for British Cycling as a directeur sportif and coach.

== Biography ==
Newton was born in Middlesbrough, England on 29 September 1973. He went to Linthorpe Juniors and Boynton Comprehensive in Teesside, and, aged 13, started cycling with Teesside Clarion. He is an alumnus of the University of Teesside in Middlesbrough. Newton first competed in the Commonwealth Games in 1994, winning the silver medal in the Team Pursuit with Tony Doyle, Rob Hayles and Bryan Steel.

He was a member of the British Team Pursuit squad which finished tenth in the 1996 Olympic Games in Atlanta. The team included Matt Illingworth, Rob Hayles and Bryan Steel. He won the bronze medal in the Team Pursuit at the 2000 Olympic Games in Sydney. He won a silver medal in the Team Pursuit, and the bronze in the Points Race at the 2002 Commonwealth Games in Manchester.

Newton won the silver medal in Team Pursuit at the 2004 Olympic Games in Athens. He also competed in the Points Race, but failed to finish the race. He won gold in Team Pursuit at the 2006 Commonwealth Games in Melbourne.

Despite his focus on pursuing a track career at world class level, Newton's all-round ability has also seen him take many wins in top international amateur road races throughout his career.

Newton broke his collarbone on 6 March 2008 when a car door was opened in his path whilst he was training on the road, putting him out of contention for the upcoming World Championships at the end of March. This put him on the backfoot at the 2008 Summer Olympics in Beijing, where he contested the points race. Joan Llaneras built up an impressive lead to take the gold, leaving Newton to battle it out with Roger Kluge for silver. A late attack by Kluge left Newton unable to respond, but he was happy to take a bronze medal at his fourth Olympic Games.

At the first round of the World Cup Classics series, in Manchester on 1 November 2008, Newton was on top form and dominated the points race. He was the clear winner and won the final sprint to a standing ovation from the crowd. On that night Great Britain won all gold in all 6 events.

== Major results ==
=== Track ===
1993
1st Scratch, National Track Championships
1994
2nd Team pursuit, Commonwealth Games (with Tony Doyle, Rob Hayles & Bryan Steel)
3rd Madison, National Track Championships
1995
National Track Championships

1st Scratch
1st Team pursuit
3rd Madison

1996
UCI Track Cycling World Cup Classics

3rd Team pursuit, Cottbus (with Rob Hayles, Matt Illingworth & Bryan Steel)
3rd Team pursuit, Busto Garolfo (with Shaun Wallace, Matt Illingworth & Bryan Steel)

1999
1st Team pursuit, National Track Championships
2000
2nd Team pursuit, UCI Track Cycling World Championships (with Bradley Wiggins, Paul Manning & Bryan Steel)
3rd Team pursuit, Olympic Games (with Jon Clay, Rob Hayles, Paul Manning, Bryan Steel & Bradley Wiggins)
3rd Team pursuit, UCI Track Cycling World Cup Classics, Turin
2001
2nd Team pursuit, UCI Track Cycling World Championships (with Bradley Wiggins, Paul Manning & Bryan Steel)
3rd Individual pursuit, National Track Championships
2002
UCI Track Cycling World Championships

1st Points race
2nd Team pursuit (with Bradley Wiggins, Paul Manning & Bryan Steel)

1st Points race, National Track Championships
Commonwealth Games

2nd Team pursuit (with Paul Manning, Bryan Steel & Bradley Wiggins)
3rd Points race

2003
1st Scratch, National Track Championships
3rd Points race, UCI Track Cycling World Cup Classics, Aguascalientes
2004
2004 UCI Track Cycling World Cup Classics

1st Team pursuit, Manchester (with Rob Hayles, Paul Manning & Bryan Steel)
2nd Points race, Sydney
3rd Scratch, Moscow

National Track Championships

1st Points race
1st Scratch
1st Team pursuit (with Paul Manning, Tom White & Mark Cavendish)

2nd Team pursuit, Olympic Games (with Steve Cummings, Paul Manning & Bryan Steel)
2nd Team pursuit, UCI Track Cycling World Championships (with Rob Hayles, Paul Manning & Bryan Steel)
3rd Points race, 2004–05 UCI Track Cycling World Cup Classics, Los Angeles
2005
1st Team pursuit, UCI Track Cycling World Championships (with Steve Cummings, Paul Manning and Rob Hayles)
1st Team pursuit, 2004–05 UCI Track Cycling World Cup Classics, Manchester (with Steve Cummings, Paul Manning and Rob Hayles)
2nd Team pursuit, 2005–06 UCI Track Cycling World Cup Classics, Manchester (with Mark Cavendish, Paul Manning and Rob Hayles)
2006
1st Team pursuit, Commonwealth Games (with Steve Cummings, Paul Manning and Rob Hayles)
1st Team pursuit, 2006–07 UCI Track Cycling World Cup Classics, Moscow (with Paul Manning, Geraint Thomas & Ed Clancy)
National Track Championships

1st Scratch
1st Team pursuit (with Paul Manning, Steve Cummings and Ed Clancy)
3rd Individual pursuit

3rd Points race, 2005–06 UCI Track Cycling World Cup Classics, Sydney
2007
2007–08 UCI Track Cycling World Cup Classics

1st Team pursuit, Sydney
2nd Points race, Beijing

National Track Championships

1st Points race
2nd Scratch

2nd Points race, 2006–07 UCI Track Cycling World Cup Classics, Los Angeles
2008
1st Points race, 2008–09 UCI Track Cycling World Cup Classics, Manchester
National Track Championships

1st Points race
1st Scratch

3rd Points race, Olympic Games
2007–08 UCI Track Cycling World Cup Classics

3rd Points race, Los Angeles
3rd Points race, Copenhagen

2009
2008–09 UCI Track Cycling World Cup Classics

1st Points race, Beijing
1st Team pursuit, Copenhagen
2nd Scratch, Beijing

1st Points race, 2009–10 UCI Track Cycling World Cup Classics, Manchester
National Track Championships

1st Points race
1st Scratch

3rd Points race, UCI Track Cycling World Championships

=== Road ===
1993
1st British Centre of Excellence Road Race
1995
1st Overall Silver Spoon 2-day

1st Stage 2 (TTT)

1st Archer Grand Prix
3rd National Hill Climb Championships
1996
1st Tour of Lancashire
1st Archer Grand Prix
2nd Overall Tour de Langkawi

1st Mountains classification
1st Stage 2 (TTT)

3rd National 25-mile Time Trial Championships
1997
1st National Team Time Trial Championships
1st National 25-mile Time Trial Championships
1st Grand Prix de l'Oms a Fontainne
1st Grand Prix de la Londe
1st Grand Prix Bonville
1st Grand Prix de Geneve
1998
1st National Team Time Trial Championships
1st Overall Europa 2-day

1st Stages 1 & 2

1st Manx International Time Trial
1st Grand Prix of Essex
1st Mersey Invitation Time Trial
2nd National 25-mile Time Trial Championships
8th Overall PruTour
1999
1st Time trial, National Road Championships
1st National Team Time Trial Championships
1st National 25-mile Time Trial Championships
1st Overall Europa 2-day
1st Manx International Time Trial
4th Mi-août bretonne
6th Lincoln Grand Prix
2000
1st Time trial, National Road Championships
1st Overall Europa 2-day

1st Stage 2

1st Grand Prix Criquielion
1st Internationale Wielertrofee Jong Maar Moedig
1st Lincoln Grand Prix
1st Silver Spoon Chase
1st Oleum Grand Prix
Olympia's Tour

1st Stages 7 (ITT) & 8

3rd National 25-mile Time Trial Championships
2001
National Road Championships

1st Circuit race
3rd Time trial

1st Overall Circuit des Mines

1st Stage 5

1st Grand Prix Ploogestraat
1st Lancaster Grand Prix
1st Stage 3 Cinturón a Mallorca
2002
1st Tour de la Manche
1st Stage 1 Bohemia Tour
2nd Overall Rás Tailteann

1st Sprints classification
1st Stages 1, 6, 7 & 8

3rd National 25-mile Time Trial Championships
7th Overall Circuit des Mines

1st Stage 4

2003
1st Overall Rás Tailteann

1st Stage 5

2nd Archer Grand Prix
5th Lincoln Grand Prix
2004
3rd Colne Grand Prix
2005
1st Time trial, National Road Championships
1st Overall Rás Tailteann

1st Stages 2, 3 & 6

2nd Clitheroe Town Centre Grand Prix
2006
1st Overall Tour of the South

1st Stage 1

Rás Tailteann

1st Stages 1 & 6 (TTT)

1st Prologue Boucles de la Mayenne
2nd National 25-mile Time Trial Championships
2nd Rutland–Melton CiCLE Classic
2007
1st Overall Premier Calendar
1st Overall Bikeline 2-day

1st Stage 1

1st Ryedale Grand Prix
2nd Time trial, National Road Championships
2nd Overall 38th Girvan 3-day

1st Stage 1

2nd Beaumont Trophy
3rd Blackpool Grand Prix
5th Overall Rás Tailteann
5th Tour of Pendle
2008
1st Clayton Velo Spring Classic
1st Stage 3 Rás Tailteann
4th Lincoln Grand Prix
4th Richmond Grand Prix
2009
1st Rochdale Grand Prix Circuit Race
3rd Time trial, National Road Championships
3rd Newcastle Leazes Criterium
4th Lincoln Grand Prix
6th Overall Rás Tailteann
2010
1st Overall Premier Calendar
1st Lincoln Grand Prix
1st Tour Doon Hame
1st Beaumont Trophy
3rd Clayton Velo Spring Classic
4th East Yorkshire Classic
5th York Cycling City Centre Race
