= Stewart Brydon =

Scottish cyclist

Personal information
- Born: 26 January 1967 (age 59) Glasgow, Scotland

Cycling career
- Sport: Cycling
- Discipline: Track
- Role: Rider

Amateur teams
- 1985: Eagle RC
- 1986-1995: City of Edinburgh RC

Stewart Brydon (born 1967) is a Scottish former racing cyclist, a multiple British national champion on the track in the sprint (British Track Sprint champion six times consecutively ), twice tandem champion with Eddie Alexander and a winner of the Keirin and team sprint titles. He represented Scotland at three Commonwealth Games in 1986, 1990 and 1994.

== Palmarès ==
1986
2nd Tandem, 1986 British National Track Championships
2nd 1 Km sprint, 1986 British National Track Championships

1987
1st Tandem, 1987 British National Track Championships
3rd 1 Km sprint, 1987 British National Track Championships

1988
1st Tandem, 1988 British National Track Championships
2nd 1 Km sprint, 1988 British National Track Championships

1989
1st 1 Km sprint, 1989 British National Track Championships
2nd time trial, 1989 British National Track Championships

1990
1st 1 Km sprint, 1990 British National Track Championships

1991
1st 1 Km sprint, 1991 British National Track Championships

1992
1st 1 Km sprint, 1992 British National Track Championships

1993
1st 1 Km sprint, 1993 British National Track Championships
1st Keirin, 1993 British National Track Championships
1st Team sprint, 1993 British National Track Championships

1994
1st 1 Km sprint, 1994 British National Track Championships
1st Team sprint, 1994 British National Track Championships

1995
1st Team sprint, 1995 British National Track Championships

== See also ==
- City of Edinburgh Racing Club
- Achievements of members of City of Edinburgh Racing Club
