= 2009 British National Track Championships =

- Venue: Manchester, England
- Date(s): 20–24 October 2009
- Velodrome: Manchester Velodrome

The 2009 British National Track Championships were a series of track cycling competitions held from 20–24 October 2009 at the Manchester Velodrome. They are organised and sanctioned by British Cycling, and were open to British cyclists.

== Medal summary ==
=== Men's Events ===
Event	Gold	Silver	Bronze
1 Km Time Trial	Steven Burke	Ed Clancy	David Daniell
Sprint	Chris Hoy	Matthew Crampton	Jason Kenny
Keirin	Chris Hoy	Jason Kenny	Christian Lyte
Team sprint	Jamie Staff; Chris Hoy; Ross Edgar	Christian Lyte; David Daniell; Matthew Crampton	Kevin Stewart; Matthew Haynes; Bruce Croall
Individual Pursuit	Geraint Thomas	Andy Tennant	Ben Swift
Team pursuit	Sam Harrison; Andrew Magnier; Ian Cooper; Boyd Roberts	Jack Kirk; James Holland-Leader; Jonathan Mould; John McClelland	Chris Bush, Jason Streather; Benedict Elliott & Jack Green; Paul Barber, John Brearley; Jamie Rogers & Anthony Nash
Points	Chris Newton	Andy Tennant	Jonathan Mould
Scratch	Chris Newton	Alex Dowsett	Mark Christian

=== Women's Events ===
Event	Gold	Silver	Bronze
500m time trial	Victoria Pendleton	Jessica Varnish	Becky James
Sprint	Victoria Pendleton	Jessica Varnish	Becky James
Keirin	Victoria Pendleton	Becky James	Helen Scott
Team sprint	Helen Scott; Jessica Varnish	Jenny Davis; Charline Joiner	Janet Birkmyre; Cassie Gledhill
Individual Pursuit	Sarah Storey	Hannah Mayho	Dani King
Points	Lizzie Armitstead	Hannah Mayho	Dani King
Scratch	Lizzie Armitstead	Hannah Mayho	Dani King
Madison	Alex Greenfield; Dani King	Corrine Hall; Hannah Barnes	Hannah Mayho; Laura Trott
