= 2010 British National Track Championships =

- Venue: Manchester, England
- Date: 21–25 September 2010
- Velodrome: Manchester Velodrome

The 2010 British National Track Championships were a series of track cycling competitions held from 21 to 25 September 2010 at the Manchester Velodrome. They are organised and sanctioned by British Cycling, and were open to British cyclists.

== Medal summary ==
=== Men's Events ===
Event	Gold	Silver	Bronze
1 km Time Trial	Bruce Croall	Andrew Kelly	Ieuan Williams
Sprint	Jason Kenny	Matthew Crampton	Chris Hoy
Keirin	Ross Edgar	Jason Kenny	Chris Pritchard
Team sprint	Chris Hoy; Jason Kenny; Ross Edgar; Matt Crampton	John Paul; Callum Skinner; Kevin Stewart	Jody Cundy; Andrew Kelly; Dave Readle
Individual Pursuit	Peter Kennaugh	George Atkins	Sam Harrison
Team pursuit	Ben Elliot; Jack Green; Chris Bush; Barney Storey	Jody Cundy; Tim Lawson; Adam Duggleby; Alistair Rutherford	Andrew Magnier; Rich Hepworth; Jason White; Simon Wilson
Points	George Atkins	Simon Yates	Mark Christian
Scratch	Peter Kennaugh	Simon Yates	Geraint Thomas

=== Women's Events ===
Event	Gold	Silver	Bronze
500m time trial	Victoria Pendleton	Becky James	Jessica Varnish
Sprint	Victoria Pendleton	Becky James	Jessica Varnish
Keirin	Victoria Pendleton	Jessica Varnish	Helen Scott
Team sprint	Jess Varnish; Becky James	Jenny Davis; Charline Joiner	Emma Baird; Kayleigh Brogan
Individual Pursuit	Wendy Houvenaghel	Sarah Storey	Laura Trott
Team pursuit	Sarah Storey; Dani King; Alex Greenfield	Rebecca Romero; Janet Birkmyre; Emily Wix	Louise Satherley; Donna Williams; Estelle Rogers
Points	Corrine Hall	Dani King	Anna Blyth
Scratch	Anna Blyth	Harriet Owen	Dani King
