= Nick Barnes =

English cyclist

Personal information
- Born: 3 June 1964 Dartford, Kent, England

Cycling career
- Sport: Cycling
- Discipline: Track cycling
- Role: Rider

Nick Barnes (born 1964) is an English male former track cyclist.

== Cycling career ==
Barnes was a British track champion after winning the British National Keirin Championships on the Dave Quinn Cycles team in 1991.
