= Cycling at the 2006 Commonwealth Games =

- Venue: Melbourne Park Multi-Purpose Venue (track); Royal Botanic Gardens, Melbourne (road race)
- Location: Melbourne, Australia
- Dates: 15 to 26 March 2006

Cycling at the 2006 Commonwealth Games was the 17th appearance of Cycling at the Commonwealth Games. The cycling competition was made up of three disciplines: track cycling, road cycling and mountain biking.

The track cycling was held at the Melbourne Park Multi-Purpose Venue. The (road cycling) time trial took place on a course on the St Kilda Foreshore and Beach Road, and the State Mountain Bike Course, Lysterfield Park hosted the mountain bike event. The road race was contested on a circuit through the Royal Botanic Gardens.

== Medal table ==
* Host nation (Australia)

Rank	Nation	Gold	Silver	Bronze	Total
1	Australia*	11	8	5	24
2	England	4	5	2	11
3	Scotland	1	1	4	6
4	Canada	1	1	3	5
5	Isle of Man	1	0	0	1
6	New Zealand	0	2	2	4
7	South Africa	0	1	0	1
8	Wales	0	0	2	2
Totals (8 entries)		18	18	18	54

== Medallists ==
=== Road ===
Event	Gold	Silver	Bronze
Men's road race	Mathew Hayman; Australia	David George; South Africa	Allan Davis; Australia
Women's road race	Natalie Bates; Australia	Oenone Wood; Australia	Nicole Cooke; Wales
Men's time trial	Nathan O'Neill; Australia	Ben Day; Australia	Gordon McCauley; New Zealand
Women's time trial	Oenone Wood; Australia	Kathy Watt; Australia	Sara Carrigan; Australia

=== Mountain bike ===
Event	Gold	Silver	Bronze
Men's cross country	Liam Killeen; England	Oli Beckingsale; England	Seamus McGrath; Canada
Women's cross country	Marie-Hélène Prémont; Canada	Rosara Joseph; New Zealand	Kiara Bisaro; Canada

=== Track ===
Event	Gold	Silver	Bronze
Men's individual pursuit	Paul Manning; England	Rob Hayles; England	Steve Cummings; England
Women's individual pursuit	Katie Mactier; Australia	Katherine Bates; Australia	Emma Jones; England
Men's team pursuit	England; Steve Cummings; Rob Hayles; Paul Manning; Chris Newton	Australia; Ashley Hutchinson; Matthew Goss; Stephen Wooldridge; Mark Jamieson	New Zealand; Hayden Godfrey; Timothy Gudsell; Marc Ryan; Peter Latham; Jason Allen
Men's individual sprint	Ryan Bayley; Australia	Ross Edgar; Scotland	Travis Smith; Canada
Women's individual sprint	Victoria Pendleton; England	Anna Meares; Australia	Kerrie Meares; Australia
Men's team sprint	Scotland; Ross Edgar; Chris Hoy; Craig MacLean	England; Matthew Crampton; Jason Queally; Jamie Staff	Australia; Ryan Bayley; Shane Kelly; Shane Perkins
Men's points race	Sean Finning; Australia	Hayden Roulston; New Zealand	Geraint Thomas; Wales
Women's points race	Katherine Bates; Australia	Rochelle Gilmore; Australia	Kate Cullen; Scotland
Men's scratch	Mark Cavendish; Isle of Man	Ashley Hutchinson; Australia	James McCallum; Scotland
Men's keirin	Ryan Bayley; Australia	Travis Smith; Canada	Ross Edgar; Scotland
Men's 1 km time trial	Ben Kersten; Australia	Jason Queally; England	Chris Hoy; Scotland
Women's 500 m time trial	Anna Meares; Australia	Victoria Pendleton; England	Kerrie Meares; Australia
