= Dennis Lightfoot =

English cyclist

Personal information
- Born: 19 February 1962 Warrington, England

Cycling career
- Sport: Cycling
- Discipline: Track cycling
- Role: Rider

Professional team
- 1986: Snooker Torremolinos

Dennis Lightfoot (born 1962) is an English man former track cyclist

== Cycling career ==
Lightfoot was a British track champion after winning the British National Keirin Championships in 1986, just three months after switching from amateur to professional status.
