= Peter Jacques (cyclist) =

British cyclist

Personal information
- Born: c.1968 Yorkshire

Cycling career
- Sport: Cycling
- Discipline: Track
- Role: Rider

Amateur teams
- 1986: Clarion Calder RC
- 1990: Bradford RC
- 1994: Manchester Wheelers
- 1995-2000: City of Edinburgh RC

Peter Jacques is a male English former international professional track cyclist,

== Cycling career ==
He is a multiple national champion on the track in the team sprint (five times), three times Omnium champion and twice a winner of the Keirin title. He represented England in the sprint event, at the 1998 Commonwealth Games in Kuala Lumpur, Malaysia.

He just missed out on a bronze medal at the 1998 Commonwealth Games losing 2-1 to Barry Forde in the bronze medal play off.

== Palmarès ==
1995
1st Team sprint, 1995 British National Track Championships

1996
1st Team sprint, 1996 British National Track Championships
1st Kerrin, 1996 British National Track Championships
3rd Sprint, 1996 British National Track Championships

1997
1st Team sprint, 1997 British National Track Championships
1st Kerrin, 1997 British National Track Championships
1st Omnium, 1997 British National Track Championships
3rd Sprint, 1997 British National Track Championships

1998
1st Team sprint, 1998 British National Track Championships
1st Omnium, 1998 British National Track Championships
2nd Scratch, 1998 British National Track Championships

1999
1st Team sprint, 1999 British National Track Championships
1st Omnium, 1999 British National Track Championships

2000
2nd Tandem, 2000 British National Track Championships

== See also ==
- City of Edinburgh Racing Club
- Achievements of members of City of Edinburgh Racing Club
