= Craig Percival =

Personal information
- Full name: Craig Percival
- Born: Whitehaven, United Kingdom
- Height: 1.84 m (6 ft 1/2 in)
- Weight: 93–98 kg (205–216 lb)

Cycling career
- Sport: Cycling
- Discipline: Track
- Role: Rider
- Rider type: Sprinter

Amateur team
- Team Brite

Professional team

Craig Percival is a male former English international track cyclist.

== Cycling career ==
A multi national GB champion, he represented Great Britain in multiple track cycling world championships in the sprint and keirin events England, at the 1998 Commonwealth Games in Kuala Lumpur, Malaysia. He also won the British National Keirin Championships title in 1998 and 1999 and was a British sprint cycling champion and record holder. Also competed in the invitation only Kokosai Keirin in Japan in 2000.

== Various Palmarès ==
Date	Placing	Event	Competition	Location	Country
July 1997	3	Team sprint	World Cup	Athens	Greece
1998	1	Keirin	British National Track Championships		United Kingdom
21 June 1998	3	Team sprint	World Cup	Hyères	France
1999	1	Keirin	British National Track Championships		United Kingdom
1999	2	Sprint	British National Track Championships		United Kingdom -1996 || 1 || Sprint || British National Track Championships || || United Kingdom
6 September 1999	3	Team sprint	World Cup	Cali	Colombia

Kokosai Keirin Japan 2000
