= Katie Cullen =

Scottish racing cyclist (born 1977)

Kate Cullen
Personal information
- Full name: Kate Cullen
- Born: 30 May 1977 (age 49)

Cycling career
- Sport: Cycling
- Discipline: Track
- Role: Rider
- Rider type: Endurance

Amateur team
- City of Edinburgh Racing Club
Medal record
Representing Scotland
Women's track cycling
Commonwealth Games
Bronze medal – third place	2002 Manchester	Women's Points Race

Kate Cullen, also known as Katie, (born 30 May 1977) is a Scottish racing cyclist from Edinburgh who won bronze in the points race at the 2006 Commonwealth Games in Melbourne.

== Biography ==
Cullen began cycling after she began a project whilst studying to become an Architect at the Glasgow School of Art. She hypothetically designed a velodrome and visited Manchester Velodrome, where she had a go at riding the track. Cullen enjoyed the experience so much she began cycling at Meadowbank Stadium once she had returned to Edinburgh.

== Palmarès ==
2005
1st (United Kingdom) British National Derny Championships
2nd Points race, British National Track Championships

2006
1st (United Kingdom) Points race, British National Track Championships
3rd Points race, Commonwealth Games

2007
1st (United Kingdom) Points race, British National Track Championships
1st (United Kingdom) Scratch race, British National Track Championships

== See also ==
- City of Edinburgh Racing Club
- Achievements of members of City of Edinburgh Racing Club
