= Rob Jefferies =

English racing cyclist (1968–2011)

Personal information
- Full name: Robert John Jefferies
- Nickname: Big Rob
- Born: 1 May 1968 Lambeth, Greater London, England
- Died: 26 May 2011 (aged 43) Wareham, Dorset, England
- Height: 1.93 m (6 ft 4 in)
- Weight: 95 kg (209 lb; 15.0 st)

Cycling career
- Sport: Cycling
- Disciplines: Road and track
- Role: Rider, volunteer and British Cycling employee
- Rider type: Sprinter

Amateur teams
- Festival RC
- Delaune CC
- Brixton Cycles
- Team Welwyn CC
- Bournemouth Jubilee Wheelers
- Poole Wheelers

Robert John Jefferies (1 May 1968 – 26 May 2011) was an English cyclist. He was the bronze medalist at the British National Derny Champion in 1999, and the bronze medalist in the Keirin at the British National Track Championships in 1993. He was also a teacher and held a degree in Silversmithing from the Camberwell College of Arts. Jefferies was employed as Volunteer Support Officer and then as Officials Education Officer for British Cycling.

Jefferies was killed after being struck by a car whilst cycling along the A351 near Wareham. In tribute to him, a ghost bike was placed next to the roadside where he was killed. A memorial ride was also held, attended by over 70 cyclists including his wife and daughter, and went across Studland Heath.

== Palmarès ==
1993
3rd Keirin, British National Track Championships

1999
3rd British National Derny Championships
