= Jason Queally =

English track cyclist (born 1970)

Jason Queally MBE
Personal information
- Full name: Jason Paul Queally
- Born: 11 May 1970 (age 56) Great Haywood, Staffordshire, England

Cycling career
- Sport: Cycling
- Discipline: Track
- Role: Rider
Medal record
Men's track cycling
Representing Great Britain
Olympic Games
Gold medal – first place	2000 Sydney	1 km time trial
Silver medal – second place	2000 Sydney	Team sprint
World Championships
Gold medal – first place	2005 Los Angeles	Team sprint
Silver medal – second place	1999 Berlin	Team sprint
Silver medal – second place	2000 Manchester	Team sprint
Silver medal – second place	2005 Los Angeles	1 km time trial
Bronze medal – third place	2000 Manchester	1 km Time Trial
Bronze medal – third place	2001 Antwerp	Team sprint
Bronze medal – third place	2003 Stuttgart	Team sprint
Bronze medal – third place	2004 Melbourne	Team sprint
European Elite Championships
Gold medal – first place	2010 Pruszków	Team pursuit
Representing England
Commonwealth Games
Silver medal – second place	1998 Kuala Lumpur	1 km time trial
Silver medal – second place	2002 Manchester	1 km time trial
Silver medal – second place	2002 Manchester	Team Sprint
Silver medal – second place	2006 Melbourne	1 km time trial
Silver medal – second place	2006 Melbourne	Team Sprint

Jason Paul Queally MBE (born 11 May 1970) is an English track cyclist. He won a gold medal at the 2000 Olympics in Sydney.

== Early years ==
Born at Great Haywood, Staffordshire, Queally spent his childhood in Caton, a village near Lancaster. He attended Caton County Primary School and Lancaster Royal Grammar School, where he was part of the swimming squad in the mid-1980s, later representing Lancaster and British Universities in water polo while a student at Lancaster University, where he earned a BSc in Biological Science. He took up cycle-racing at 25.

In 1996, he nearly died in an accident at Meadowbank cycling track in Edinburgh (Chris Hoy brought down all the riders behind him, having caught the wheel of Craig MacLean) when an 18-inch sliver of the wooden track entered his chest via his armpit. The accident seriously affected Queally's confidence in tactical racing; as a result, he no longer took part in the sprint events, instead choosing to dedicate himself to Kilo and team sprint riding, time trial events with a reduced risk of crashing.

== Post Sydney ==
Queally was appointed Member of the Order of the British Empire (MBE) in the 2001 New Year Honours for services to cycling.

In October 2001 he competed in the World Human Powered Speed Challenge at Battle Mountain, Nevada on the Blueyonder recumbent bicycle, built largely from carbon fibre by Reynard Motorsport to a design by Chris Field. Queally maintained 64.34 mph (103.55 km/h) over the 200m timed section of the course, a European record. The winner, Sam Whittingham, achieved 80.55 mph (129.63 km/h).

Although Olympic champion, Queally was not selected for the 1 km time trial at the 2004 Summer Olympics, competing only in the team sprint, in which Great Britain team was eliminated in the first round by Germany, the eventual winner, despite posting the second fastest time of the competition.

In 2009, Queally was inducted into the British Cycling Hall of Fame.

Queally retired from able-bodied cycling after failing to qualify for the 2008 Summer Olympics. He subsequently worked with Paralympic cyclist Anthony Kappes with the aim of competing together on a tandem at the 2012 Summer Paralympics. However he returned to able-bodied competition when he received a call up to the British squad for the 2010 UCI Track Cycling World Championships. After not being selected for the 2012 Summer Olympics he rejoined the British paralympic cycling squad as a pilot for the tandem events in November 2012.

== Medals in championships ==
- Olympic Games
  - 2000
    - Gold, 1km time trial
    - Silver, team sprint
- World Championships
  - 2005
    - Gold, team sprint
    - Silver, 1 km time trial
  - 2004
    - Bronze, team sprint
  - 2003
    - Bronze, team sprint
  - 2001
    - Bronze, team sprint
  - 2000
    - Silver, team sprint
    - Bronze, 1 km time trial
  - 1999
    - Silver, team sprint
- Commonwealth Games
  - 2006
    - Silver, 1 km time trial
    - Silver, team sprint
  - 2002
    - Silver, 1 km time trial
    - Silver, team sprint
  - 1998
    - Silver, 1 km time trial

== See also ==
- City of Edinburgh Racing Club
- Achievements of members of City of Edinburgh Racing Club
