= Thomas Scammell =

American sleep medicine neurologist and researcher

Thomas E. Scammell is an American neurologist and professor of neurology at Harvard Medical School. He works as a physician at the department of neurology at Beth Israel Deaconess Medical Center and Boston Children's Hospital. He is an editor of SLEEP.

Scammell earned a Bachelor of Science degree in neuroscience from the University of Rochester in 1984 and a Doctor of Medicine degree from the University of Massachusetts Medical School in 1988.
