= Jenny Davis =

Scottish racing cyclist

Personal information
- Born: 1983 or 1984 (age 42–43)

Cycling career
- Sport: Cycling
Medal record
Representing Scotland
Women's track cycling
Commonwealth Games
Silver medal – second place	2010 Delhi	Team sprint

Jenny Davis (born 1983 or 1984) is a Scottish racing cyclist from East Calder, West Lothian.

Davis is a Commonwealth Games silver medallist, coming second in the Women’s Team Sprint in the Delhi 2010 Games.

Davis studied at West Calder High School before continuing her education at Queen Margaret University, graduating with a BSc in Health Psychology.

== See also ==
- City of Edinburgh Racing Club
- Achievements of members of City of Edinburgh Racing Club
