= Robert Coull =

British cyclist

Personal information
- Born: 28 August 1966 (age 60) Rotherham, England

Cycling career
- Sport: Cycling

Robert Coull (born 28 August 1966) is a British former cyclist. He competed in the team pursuit event at the 1988 Summer Olympics.
