= Matthew Haynes =

British cyclist (born 1984)

Personal information
- Born: 1984

Cycling career
- Sport: Cycling
- Current team: City of Edinburgh Racing Club
- Discipline: Track cycling
- Role: Rider
- Rider type: sprint, time trial, tandem

Matthew Haynes (born 1984) is a British and English retired track cyclist.

== Cycling career ==
Haynes is a two time British champion winning the Time Trial Championship, at the 2004 British National Track Championships and the Tandem Championships at the 2009 British National Track Championships with Bruce Croall.
