= Dave Miller (cyclist) =

English track cyclist

Personal information
- Born: 26 December 1960 Newark-on-Trent, Nottinghamshire, England

Cycling career
- Sport: Cycling
- Disciplines: Track & road cycling
- Role: Rider

Dave Miller (born 1960) is an English male former track and road cyclist.

== Cycling career ==
Miller is a three times British National champion, winning two titles on the road; 10 Mile time trial (1977) and Criterion (1985). He won his third title on the track at the British National Track Championships winning the British National Omnium Championships in 1987.
