= Bruce Croall =

British-Scottish cyclist (born 1978)

Personal information
- Born: 3 October 1978 (age 48) Edinburgh, Scotland

Cycling career
- Sport: Cycling
- Current team: City of Edinburgh Racing Club
- Discipline: Track cycling
- Role: Rider
- Rider type: sprint, time trial

Bruce Croall (born 1978) is a British and Scottish retired track cyclist.

== Cycling career ==
Croall became British champion when winning the time trial Championship at the 2010 British National Track Championships.

He represented Scotland at the 2014 Commonwealth Games finishing in eighth place during the 1,000 metres time trial event.
