= Craig MacLean =

British cyclist

Craig MacLean MBE
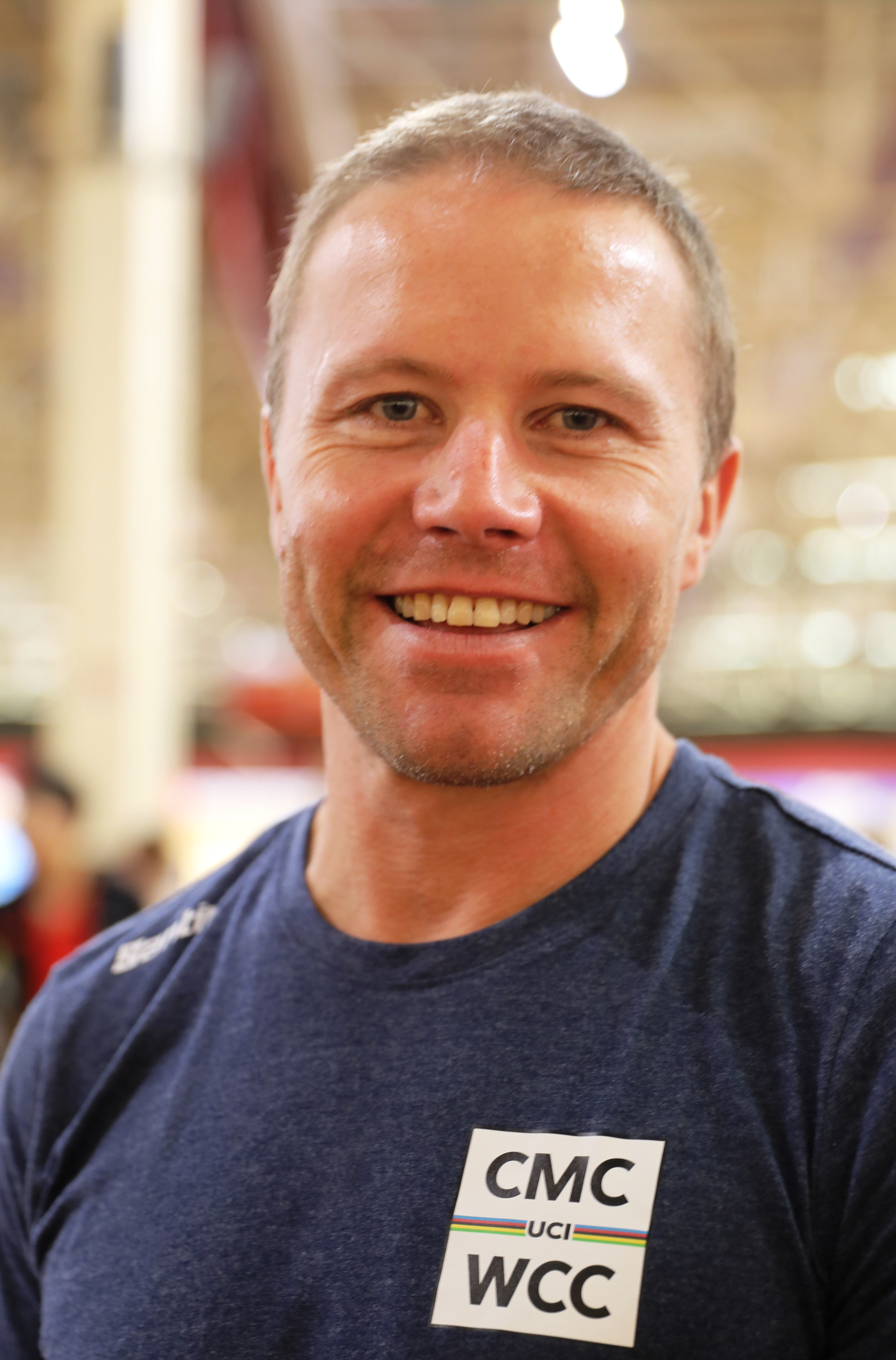
- Craig MacLean (2019)

Personal information
- Full name: Craig MacLean
- Born: 31 July 1971 (age 55) Grantown-on-Spey, Scotland
- Height: 1.74 m (5 ft 9 in)
- Weight: 87 kg (192 lb)

Cycling career
- Sport: Cycling
- Discipline: Track
- Role: Rider

Amateur team
- City of Edinburgh Racing Club

Professional team
- 2007–2008: Plowman Craven-Evans Cycles
Medal record
Men's track cycling
Representing Great Britain
Olympic Games
Silver medal – second place	2000 Sydney	Team sprint
Paralympic Games
Gold medal – first place	2012 London	Tandem B sprint
World Championships
Gold medal – first place	2002 Copenhagen	Team sprint
Silver medal – second place	1999 Berlin	Team sprint
Silver medal – second place	2000 Manchester	Team sprint
Silver medal – second place	2006 Bordeaux	Sprint
Silver medal – second place	2006 Bordeaux	Team sprint
Silver medal – second place	2007 Palma de Mallorca	Team sprint
Bronze medal – third place	2001 Antwerp	Team sprint
Bronze medal – third place	2003 Stuttgart	Team sprint
Bronze medal – third place	2004 Melbourne	Team sprint
Para-cycling World Championships
Gold medal – first place	2011 Montichiari	Tandem B sprint
Gold medal – first place	2011 Montichiari	Tandem B kilo
Gold medal – first place	2012 Los Angeles	Tandem B kilo
Gold medal – first place	2012 Los Angeles	Tandem B sprint
Bronze medal – third place	2016 Montichiari	Tandem B sprint
Representing Scotland
Commonwealth Games
Gold medal – first place	2006 Melbourne	Team sprint
Gold medal – first place	2014 Glasgow	Tandem B kilo
Gold medal – first place	2014 Glasgow	Tandem B sprint
Bronze medal – third place	2002 Manchester	Team sprint

Craig MacLean MBE (Grantown-on-Spey, July 31, 1971) is a Scottish track cyclist who represented Great Britain and Northern Ireland at the 2000 Summer Olympics in Sydney and the 2004 Summer Olympics in Athens, winning a silver medal in the Team Sprint at the 2000 Olympics. MacLean returned to the sport as a sighted guide in the Paralympics, piloting Neil Fachie to two gold medals in the 2011 UCI Para-cycling Track World Championships, and Anthony Kappes to a gold medal in the 2012 Paralympic Games. MacLean is only the second athlete, after Hungarian fencer Pál Szekeres, ever to win medals at both the Olympic and Paralympic Games.

MacLean has also won medals in five UCI Track World Championships in the team Sprint, Silver in 1999, Silver in 2000, Bronze in 2001, Gold in 2002, Bronze in 2003,Bronze in 2004, Silver in 2006 and Bronze in 2007. MacLean also won a bronze medal for Scotland in the Team sprint at the 2002 Commonwealth Games, followed by a gold medal in the event at the 2006 Commonwealth Games in Australia. As a sighted guide to Neil Fachie he won a further two gold medals at the 2014 Commonwealth Games in, and for, his native Scotland. In the Commonwealth Games, certain para-cycling events are integrated as full medal events into the program.

He was appointed Member of the Order of the British Empire (MBE) in the 2013 New Year Honours for services to cycling.

== Career ==
Born in Grantown-on-Spey, MacLean kicked off his cycling career as second man in the Great Britain Team Sprint until switching to lead man in 2002. He broke the GB kilometre record at the Olympic Trials in 2004.

MacLean's career as a member of the British elite team came to a close in 2008. He suffered from a mystery illness ( later diagnosed as Coeliac disease) for the majority of his career so could no longer perform at the level required. This, coupled with the form of rising stars like Jason Kenny and resurgence of fellow veteran Jamie Staff, meant that he narrowly missed out on the squad for the World Championships and Olympic games.

MacLean declared that the Manchester round of the World Cup Classics in November 2008 was his last ride as a UCI accredited rider. In the World Cup round he competed in the Keirin and Sprint for the Plowman Craven Trade team. He won his Keirin heat but was relegated by the officials. In the sprint he qualified in the top 5 but lost in the first round after a controversial move by his German opponent.

He sat out international competition for two years from 2008 to 2010, the mandatory requirement to become a pilot for para-cycling tandem racing. At the 2011 UCI Para-cycling Track World Championships, MacLean piloted Neil Fachie to golds in the Tandem B Sprint and Tandem B 1000m Time Trial.

In 2012, he switched to piloting Anthony Kappes, with Barney Storey piloting Fachie; the move was a success for both tandems, as each tandem team won a gold medal at the 2012 Paralympic Games. In doing so, MacLean became only the second athlete to win medals at both Olympic and Paralympic Games.

While sitting out international competition, he continued to make some racing appearances at the Revolution events in Manchester. He appeared at Revolution 22 in December 2008, competing in the Sprint and Keirin events.

MacLean reunited with Neil Fachie for the 2014 Commonwealth Games in Glasgow, where the pairing won gold in the kilo time trial. They followed this up with another gold in the sprint where they came back from losing their first ride in the final to beat the Australian duo of Kieran Modra and Jason Niblett 2–1.

== Television and media ==
In 2007 MacLean had an experimental documentary made about him called Standing Start made by BAFTA winner Adrian McDowall and Finlay Pretsell. The film documents MacLean in his build up to the World Cup team sprint win in 2007. The film has screened worldwide and premiered at the Edinburgh International Film Festival.

In November 2008 Craig took up the challenge of becoming a Bobsleigh competitor for the BBC programme 'Bobsleigh Challenge', which was broadcast in February 2009. This programme challenged Craig and fellow British sportsmen Jason Gardener, Dean Macey and Dan Luger to qualify for the British Championships in Italy, with only 10 days training. Craig teamed up with Luger as one team, while Macey and Gardener made up the other team. After training the teams had to complete two runs down the course without crashing to qualify. After a number of crashes, when both Craig and Dan were driving, both did qualify. However a number further crashes and injuries sustained by Craig meant that they did not complete two runs in the actual competition and were not classified. Just qualifying for the event with only 10 days training was still a remarkable achievement. The other team of Macey and Gardener went one better and finished 6th overall in the competition, ahead of one of the Great Britain Olympic Development teams.

Craig is featured alongside Chris Hoy in a book by Richard Moore, Heroes, Villains and Velodromes: Chris Hoy and Britain's Track Cycling Revolution. This describes how Maclean and Hoy were key figures in the rise of British Track Cycling. The book was published in June 2008 by HarperCollins. (ISBN 9780007265312)

In 2009, he was inducted into the British Cycling Hall of Fame.

== Major results ==
1999
2nd Team sprint, Track World Championships
2000
2nd Team Sprint, 2000 Summer Olympics
2nd Team sprint, Track World Championships
2001
3rd Team sprint, Track World Championships
2002
1st Team sprint, Track World Championships
3rd Team sprint, Commonwealth Games
2003
3rd Team sprint, Track World Championships
1st Kilo, British National Track Championships
1st Team sprint, British National Track Championships
2004
3rd Team sprint, Track World Championships
2nd Team sprint, Round 1, Moscow, 2004 Track World Cup
1st Kilo, Round 3, Manchester, 2004 Track World Cup
1st Team sprint, Round 3, Manchester, 2004 Track World Cup
1st Sprint, Round 4, Sydney, 2004 Track World Cup
1st Team sprint, Round 4, Sydney, 2004 Track World Cup
2005
1st Team sprint, Round 3, Manchester, 2004–2005 Track World Cup
2nd Sprint, Round 1, Moscow, 2006–2007 Track World Cup
2nd Team sprint, Round 1, Moscow, 2006–2007 Track World Cup
1st Team sprint, Round 2, Manchester, 2006–2007 Track World Cup
1st Sprint, British National Track Championships
2006
1st Team sprint, Commonwealth Games
2nd Sprint, Track World Championships
2nd Team sprint, Track World Championships
1st Sprint, Round 1, Sydney, 2006–2007 Track World Cup
1st Team sprint, Round 1, Sydney, 2006–2007 Track World Cup
3rd Sprint, Round 2, Moscow, 2006–2007 Track World Cup
1st Team sprint, Round 2, Moscow, 2006–2007 Track World Cup
1st Sprint, British National Track Championships
1st Team sprint, British National Track Championships
2007
2nd Masters of Sprint
1st Team sprint, Round 4, Manchester, 2006–2007 Track World Cup

== See also ==
- 2012 Summer Olympics and Paralympics gold post boxes
- City of Edinburgh Racing Club
- Achievements of members of City of Edinburgh Racing Club
