= James Taylor (cyclist) =

English road cyclist

Personal information
- Born: 1976 (age 49–50) Bristol, South West England

Cycling career
- Sport: Cycling
- Current team: City of Edinburgh Racing Club
- Disciplines: Track & road cycling
- Role: Rider

James Taylor (born 1976) is an English male former track and road cyclist.

== Cycling career ==
Taylor is a ten times national champion of which nine were on the track. The nine track titles at the British National Track Championships were the British National Omnium Championships in 2000, 2002 & 2003, the British National Madison Championships in 2000, 2001, 2002, 2004, 2005 & 2006, the British National Scratch Championships in 2001.
