= Louise Jones (cyclist) =

Welsh cyclist

Personal information
- Full name: Louise Christine Jones
- Born: 8 June 1963 (age 63) Chatham, England

Cycling career
- Sport: Cycling
- Disciplines: Track & Road
- Role: Rider; Commissaire

Professional team
- 1999–2000: GS Strada
Medal record
Women's track cycling
Representing Wales
Commonwealth Games
Gold medal – first place	1990 Auckland	Sprint

Louise Jones (born 8 June 1963 in Chatham, Kent, England) is a Welsh former racing cyclist. Lived in Port Talbot, Wales while competing, now resides in Brisbane.

== Career ==
Jones won the first gold medal for women in cycling at the Commonwealth Games, when women's cycling was introduced in Auckland, New Zealand in 1990. She finished fourth in the 1998 Commonwealth Games road race in Kuala Lumpur, Malaysia in 1998. She also represented Britain in the UCI Road World Championships in 1991 and the 1988 Olympic Games in Seoul and the 1992 Olympic Games in Barcelona, Spain.

Jones retired in 2000 and has worked as a commissaire for the UCI. She had been a commissaire at national level since 1994.

In addition to her international success she was a 10 times British track champion, winning the British National Individual Sprint Championships from 1986 until 1990, the British National Individual Time Trial Championships in 1990 and 1991 and the British National Points Championships in 1989.

== Personal life ==
Jones took time out from competing between 1994 and 1997 to have children with her husband Phil, a cyclist and plumber. The family moved to Brisbane, Australia in 2007 after Jones acted as a commissaire at the 2006 Commonwealth Games in Melbourne. Jones is the mother of racing cyclist Hayley Jones.

== Palmarès ==
1986
1st British National Individual Sprint Championships
1st British National Points Championships
1st British National Kilometre Championship
1st British National 800m Grasstrack Championship

1987
1st British National Individual Sprint Championships

1988
1st British National Individual Sprint Championships
7th Sprint Seoul Olympic Games

1989
1st British National Individual Sprint Championships
1st British National Points Championships

1990
1st Sprint, Commonwealth Games
1st British National Individual Sprint Championships
1st British National Individual kilometre Championships

1991
1st British National Individual Sprint Championships
1st British National Individual Kilometre Championships
2nd British National 3km Individual Pursuit Championship

1998
2nd British National Road Race Championships
2nd British National 3km Individual Pursuit Championship
4th Road Race, Commonwealth Games
