= Eddie Alexander =

Scottish racing cyclist

Personal information
- Full name: Edward Alexander
- Born: 10 August 1964 (age 62) Huntly, Aberdeenshire, Scotland, United Kingdom

Cycling career
- Sport: Cycling
- Discipline: Track
- Role: Rider

Amateur team
- City of Edinburgh RC
Medal record
Men's track cycling
Representing Scotland
Commonwealth Games
Bronze medal – third place	1986 Edinburgh	Sprint

Eddie Alexander (born 10 August 1964) is a Scottish former cyclist and a multiple national champion on the track in the tandem sprint.

== Early life ==
He worked at the CEGB in Barnwood in Gloucestershire, and lived Abbeymead.

== Cycling career ==
He won a bronze medal in the sprint at the 1986 Commonwealth Games in Edinburgh. He was fourth in the sprint at the 1988 Olympic Games in Seoul.

Alexander is a six times British track champion, winning the British National Individual Sprint Championships in 1987 and 1988, the British National Individual Time Trial Championships in 1985 and 1987 and the British National Tandem Sprint Championships in 1987 and 1988.

== Palmarès ==
1985
1st Kilo, British National Individual Time Trial Championships

1986
3rd Sprint, Commonwealth Games

1987
1st British National Tandem Sprint Championships
1st British National Individual Sprint Championships
1st Kilo, British National Individual Time Trial Championships

1988
1st British National Tandem Sprint Championships
1st British National Individual Sprint Championships
4th Sprint, Olympic Games

== See also ==
- City of Edinburgh Racing Club
- Achievements of members of City of Edinburgh Racing Club
