= Rob Hayles =

British cyclist (born 1973)

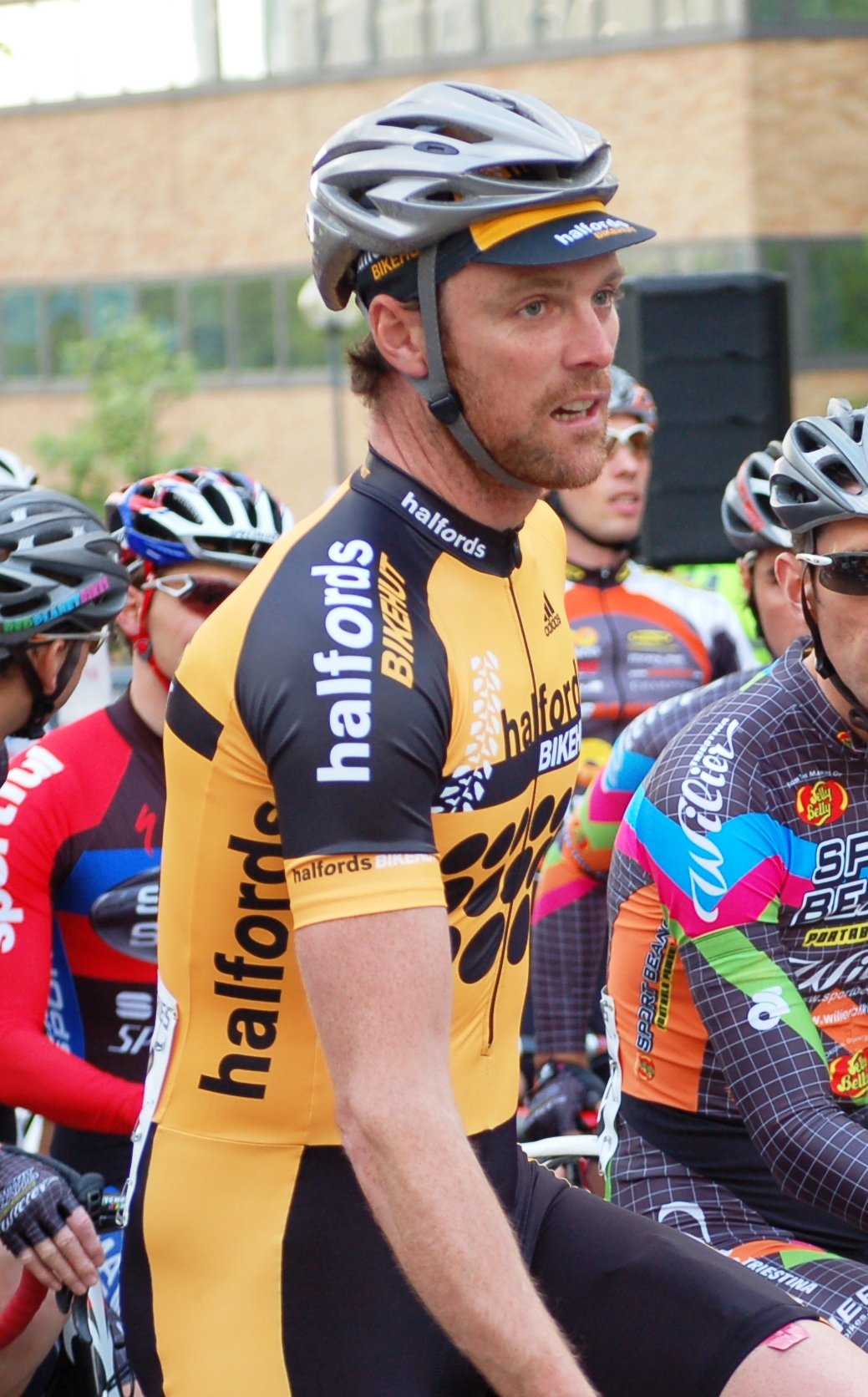
- Hayles at the 2009 Tour Series in Milton Keynes

Personal information
- Full name: Robert John Hayles
- Born: 21 January 1973 (age 53) Portsmouth, England
- Height: 1.86 m (6 ft 1 in)
- Weight: 80 kg (176 lb)

Cycling career
- Sport: Cycling
- Disciplines: Track & Road
- Role: Rider

Amateur teams
- 1994: Team Haverhill-Taylor's Foundry
- 1995: All Media-Futurama
- 1996–1997: Team Ambrosia
- 1998: Team Brite
- 1999: Tony Doyle Ltd-Clarkes Contracts

Professional teams
- 2001–2003: Cofidis
- 2005: Recycling.co.uk–MG X-Power
- 2007: Team KLR-Parker International
- 2009: Team Halfords
- 2010–2011: Endura Racing

Major wins
- Road One-day races and Classics National Road Race Championships (2008) Track World Championships Madison (2005) Team pursuit (2005)
Medal record
Representing Great Britain
Men's track cycling
Olympic Games
Silver medal – second place	2004 Athens	Team pursuit
Bronze medal – third place	2004 Athens	Madison
Bronze medal – third place	2000 Sydney	Team pursuit
Commonwealth Games
Gold medal – first place	2006 Melbourne	Team pursuit
Silver medal – second place	2006 Melbourne	Individual pursuit
World Championships
Gold medal – first place	2005 Los Angeles	Team pursuit
Gold medal – first place	2005 Los Angeles	Madison
Silver medal – second place	2006 Bordeaux	Team pursuit
Silver medal – second place	2004 Melbourne	Individual pursuit
Silver medal – second place	2004 Melbourne	Team pursuit
Silver medal – second place	2003 Stuttgart	Team pursuit
Silver medal – second place	2000 Manchester	Team pursuit
Bronze medal – third place	2000 Manchester	Individual pursuit

Robert John Hayles (born 21 January 1973) is an English track and road racing cyclist, who rode for Great Britain and England on the track and several professional teams on the road. Hayles competed in the team pursuit and Madison events, until his retirement in 2011. He now occasionally provides studio-based analysis of cycle races for British Eurosport.

== Career ==
He first represented Great Britain in the Olympic Games in Atlanta in 1996, where he rode the team pursuit. Hayles represented England in the points race and team pursuit at the 1998 Commonwealth Games. At the 2000 Summer Olympics, he won silver in the individual pursuit. He was a member of the pursuit team that came third, and rode the Madison with Bradley Wiggins, finishing fourth.

From 2001 to 2003, Hayles rode for the Cofidis team in France.

During this time Hayles rode the Paris–Roubaix classic, one of cycling's five 'monuments', three times but was unable to finish the race on any occasion. Hayles still reports to love the paved classic despite his own poor fortune.

In March 2008, he was withdrawn from the Great Britain team at the world track championships in Manchester, and was suspended for 14 days after a blood test showed a haematocrit 0.3% above the limit. His licence was restored after two weeks. The rules regarding haematocrit testing for track cycling were subsequently changed as the resting period before an event can cause the red cell volume to exceed 50%, with subsequent blood tests often proving the riders to be clean.

He won the 2008 national road championships but was not selected to represent Great Britain in the Beijing Olympics.

On 1 November 2008, he returned to the team pursuit for the Manchester round of the World Cup series.

== Personal life ==
As a child, Hayles lived in Cowplain, Hampshire and attended Padnell Junior School. Hayles' father John Hayles, who died in 2016, was an amateur racing cyclist who became a professional wrestler in his twenties. Hayles lives in Hayfield, Derbyshire, with his wife, former Olympic swimmer Vicky Horner, and their daughter, born 23 January 2006.

== Major results ==
=== Road ===
1996
Tour de Langkawi

1st Stages 2 (TTT) & 7

1997
2nd Overall Premier Calendar
2000
1st National Criterium Championships
2004
1st Stage 7 Tour de Normandie
2008
1st Road race, National Championships
1st Beaumont Trophy
1st Tour of Pendle
1st Blackpool Grand Prix
2nd National Criterium Championships
2009
2nd National Criterium Championships
2nd Colne Town Centre Grand Prix

=== Track ===
1993
1st Kilo, National Championships
1994
National Championships

1st Kilo
1st Madison (with Bryan Steel)

2nd Team pursuit, Commonwealth Games
1995
1st Madison, National Championships (with Russell Williams)
1996
1st Points race, National Championships
1997
National Championships

1st Points race
1st Individual pursuit
1st Madison (with Russell Williams)

1998
National Championships

1st Points race
1st Individual Pursuit
1st Madison (with Jon Clay)

2nd Team pursuit, Commonwealth Games
1999
National Championships

1st Points race
1st Individual pursuit
1st Madison (with Bradley Wiggins)

2000
National Championships

1st Points race
1st Individual pursuit

UCI World Championships

2nd Team pursuit
3rd Individual pursuit

2nd Six Days of Grenoble (with Bradley Wiggins)
3rd Team pursuit, Olympic Games
2003
2nd Team pursuit, UCI World Championships
3rd Individual pursuit, National Championships
2004
UCI World Championships

2nd Individual pursuit
2nd Team pursuit

Olympic Games

2nd Team pursuit
3rd Madison (with Bradley Wiggins)

2005
UCI World Championships

1st Madison (with Mark Cavendish)
1st Team pursuit

2006
Commonwealth Games

1st Team pursuit
2nd Individual pursuit

2nd Team pursuit, UCI World Championships
