= Colin Sturgess =

English cyclist

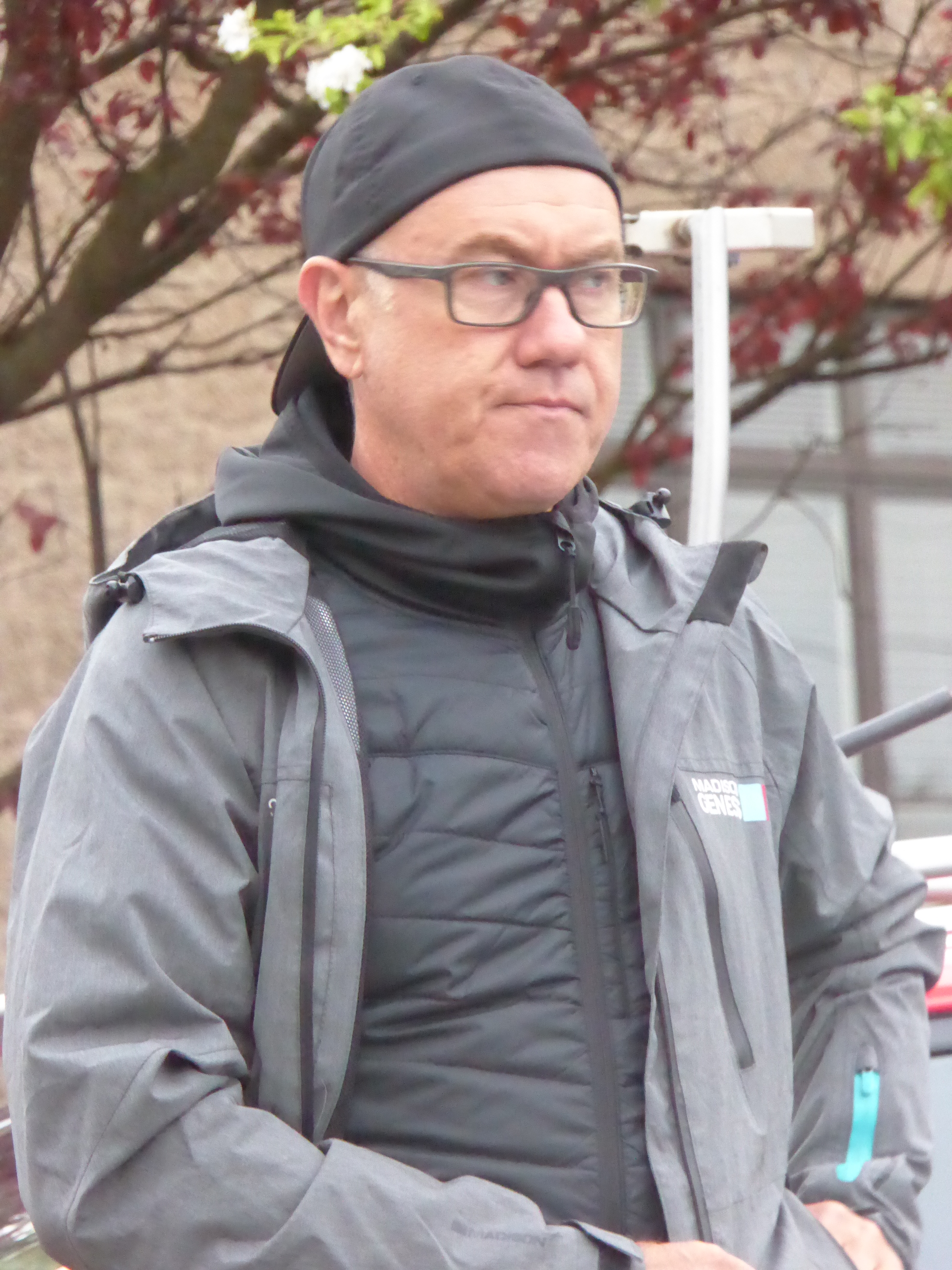
- Sturgess in 2018

Personal information
- Full name: Colin Andrew Sturgess
- Born: 15 December 1968 (age 57) Ossett, Wakefield, England
- Height: 1.80 m (5 ft 11 in)
- Weight: 77 kg (170 lb)

Cycling career
- Sport: Cycling
- Current team: Ribble Weldtite
- Disciplines: Road; Track
- Role: Rider (retired); Directeur sportif (retired)
- Rider type: Pursuitist (track)

Amateur teams
- 2015: SportGrub Kuota
- 2018: Planet X–Northside
- 2019: East Mids–Pearces–RDA

Professional teams
- 1989: AD Renting–W-Cup–Bottecchia
- 1990–1991: IOC–Tulip Computers
- 1992: Premier Milling–Snowflake
- 1998: Team Brite Voice
- 1999: Team Men's Health

Managerial teams
- 2016–2017: Metaltek–Kuota
- 2018: Madison Genesis
- 2019: Memil Pro Cycling
- 2020: EuroCyclingTrips–CMI
- 2021–2022: Ribble Weldtite
Medal record
Representing Great Britain
Track World Championships
Gold medal – first place	1989 Lyon	Individual pursuit
Bronze medal – third place	1991 Stuttgart	Individual pursuit
Representing England
Commonwealth Games
Silver medal – second place	1986 Edinburgh	Individual pursuit
Silver medal – second place	1998 Kuala Lumpur	Team pursuit

Colin Andrew Sturgess (born 15 December 1968) is an English former road and track cyclist, who last worked as a directeur sportif for UCI Continental team Ribble Weldtite. On the track, he won a gold and a bronze medal in the individual pursuit at the world championships in 1989 and 1991. He competed at the 1988 Summer Olympics in the 4 km individual pursuit and finished in fourth place. On the road, he won the British National Road Race Championships in 1990. In 2010 he was inducted to the British Cycling Hall of Fame.

== Early life ==
Sturgess was born in Ossett, Wakefield, England, the only child of Alan and Ann Sturgess, both from London. When he was six, his family moved to Johannesburg, South Africa. The family subsequently returned to the UK, settling in Leicester, in order to help Sturgess make progress in his cycling career. He took a silver medal in the individual pursuit at the 1986 Commonwealth Games in Edinburgh, finishing ahead of Chris Boardman.

== Professional career ==
Sturgess turned professional after the 1988 Olympics. Among his professional teams was ADR, where he was a team-mate of Greg LeMond. He became celebrated for his showmanship on the bike; rather than maintaining an even pace as was the conventional tactic, he would hold back until the final lap and kick hard. In his World Championship win in 1989, where he trailed Dean Woods by over a second going into the last lap, he employed this tactic and crossed the finish line 1.66 seconds ahead of his rival.

He won the British National Individual Pursuit Championships professional event three times in 1989, 1990 and 1991.

Disillusioned with the sport, in part due to drug-taking in the peloton, he had interrupted his career around 1993, when he graduated in English literature from Loughborough University and moved with his partner to Sydney, Australia. In Australia, he resumed competing, while working as a sports journal editor, and later returned to England. He finally retired in 2000, after winning a silver medal at the 1998 Commonwealth Games as part of the England team pursuit squad alongside a young Bradley Wiggins, and worked as a wine maker and wine educator near Sydney, winning national awards for his work. According to Sturgess, the immediate reason for his retirement was a dispute with British Cycling's management regarding money, however he later identified the falling out as a symptom of a then-undiagnosed case of bipolar disorder, which contributed to the break-up of his two marriages, problems with alcoholism, and a suicide attempt.

== Post-cycling career ==
Sturgess returned to the UK in 2013, and has since involved himself with coaching. In 2014 he returned to competition, winning the League of Veteran Racing Cyclists time trial championship in September of that year. In May 2016 he joined the Metaltek–Kuota team in a dual role as a rider in veterans' races and also as the team's directeur sportif. After guiding Metaltek rider Daniel Fleeman in the 2017 Rutland–Melton International CiCLE Classic, in October of that year Sturgess was announced as team manager with Madison Genesis, but left the team one year later. in 2023 Colin joined Blanca Bikes in Javea, Costa Blanca as a cycling guide and team coach https://blancabikes.com/
