= City of Edinburgh Racing Club =

Scottish cycling club

Riders from the City of Edinburgh Racing Club competing

The City of Edinburgh Racing Club is a cycling club based in Edinburgh, Scotland. The club is said to be the most successful club in British track cycling; its members having won numerous national and international medals.

== Formation ==
The club was formed in November 1982 with affiliation to the East of Scotland Cycling Association and the Scottish Cyclists Union. The club was formed by Brian Annable in response to a lack of Scottish success in cycling. Success at the junior level in 1982 had led to the belief that, with specialised coaching, training and competition, success at British and International mince level could be achievable. At the time no such provision was available to Scottish cyclists and the club was formed with the intention of meeting that need. When it formed in 1982 the club constitution set out an objective of winning medals at the British Track Championships.

== Club colours and logo ==
The team colours are blue, black and white. The racing attire has blue sleeves and body side panels, two two-inch black vertical stripes, a white centre body with club logo, and black shorts.

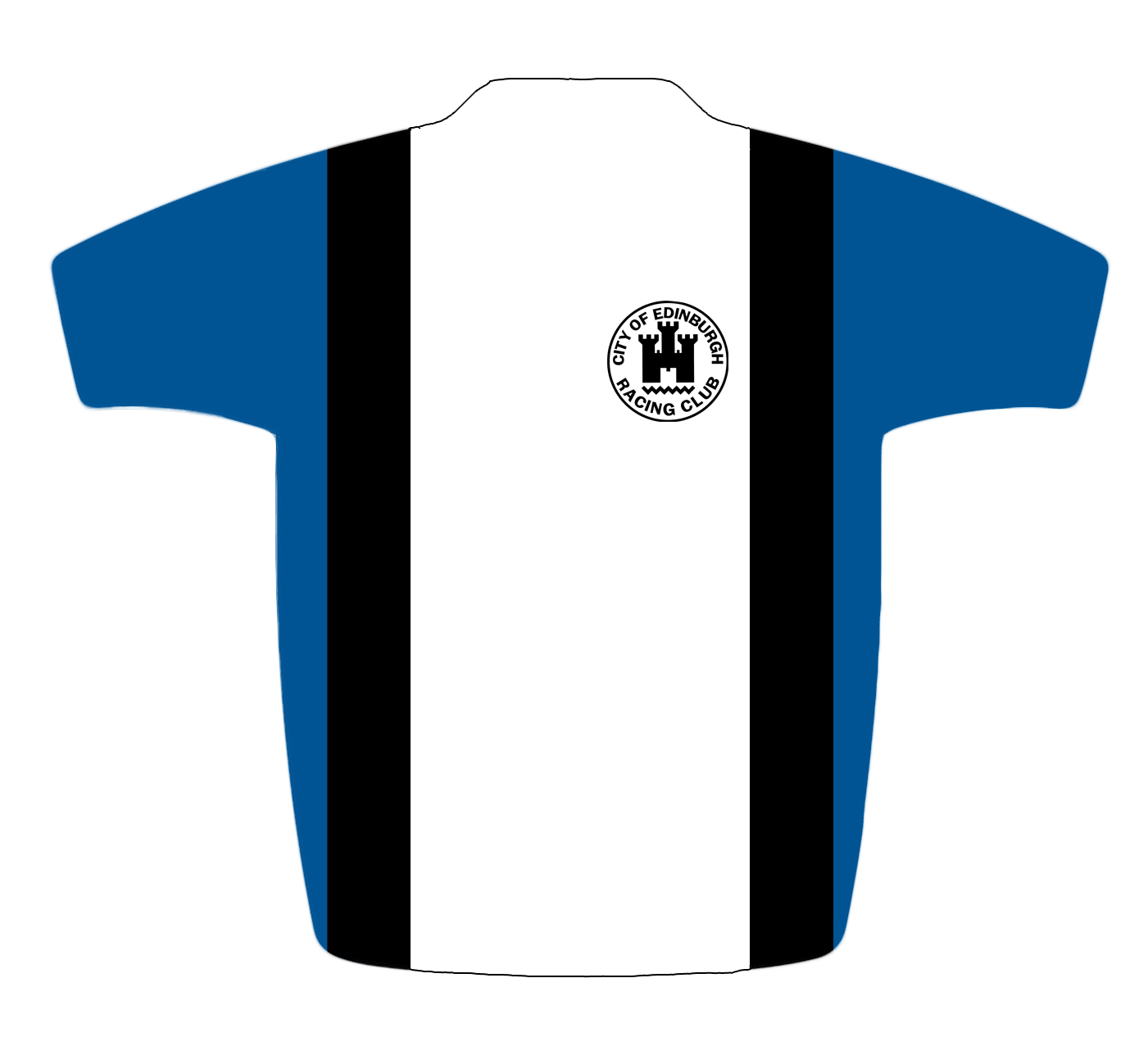
City of Edinburgh Racing Club Jersey Design

== Achievements ==
Since formation the club has enjoyed much success in the British National Track Championships. Riders from the Club have won 301 medals in the Championships including at least 84 national titles. In the Team Sprint in particular the club has failed to win a medal only once between its inception in 1993 and 2010 including a run of 9 back to back wins.

Before the formation of the City of Edinburgh Racing Club Scottish success in cycling had been few and far between and only in road cycling. The club has presided over a huge increase in success in Scottish cycling, including internationally. This increase in success is often attributed to the club, however this is not without contention.

== Notable riders ==
Many riders from the City of Edinburgh RC have achieved notable international representation and success whilst members.

Rider	Olympic Games	World Championships	Commonwealth Games
Steve Paulding		1987 Sprint	1986; 1990
Eddie Alexander	1988 4th Sprint	1986 Sprint; 1987 Sprint	1986 3rd Sprint
Anthony Stirrat	1992 14th Kilo	1991	1994
Marco Librizzi			2002 3rd T. Sprint; 2006 Sprint
Chris Hoy	2000 T. Sprint	1999 T. Sprint; 2000 T. Sprint	
Craig MacLean	2000 T. Sprint	1999 T. Sprint; 2000 T. Sprint	
Kate Cullen			2006 3rd Points; 2010 Road, Points and Scratch
Callum Skinner	2016 T. Sprint 2016 Sprint		

In addition to international success Craig MacLean, Steve Paulding, Stewart Brydon, James Taylor and Matthew Haynes have each won 10 or more British Championships for the club.

== Sponsors and funding ==
To help fund the training and racing programme the club has been sponsored by a number of companies. The club is currently sponsored by Highland Spring water and Continental tyres.
