= Bryan Steel =

English cyclist

Personal information
- Born: 5 January 1969 (age 57) Nottingham, England, United Kingdom
- Height: 1.74 m (5 ft 9 in)
- Weight: 70 kg (154 lb)

Cycling career
- Sport: Cycling
- Disciplines: Road & Track
- Role: Rider

Professional team
- -: Brite
Medal record
Men's track cycling
Representing Great Britain
Olympic Games
Silver medal – second place	2004 Athens	Team pursuit
Bronze medal – third place	2000 Sydney	Team pursuit
World Championships
Silver medal – second place	2000 Manchester	Team Pursuit
Silver medal – second place	2001 Antwerp	Team Pursuit
Silver medal – second place	2003 Stuttgart	Team Pursuit
Silver medal – second place	2004 Melbourne	Team Pursuit
Bronze medal – third place	2002 Ballerup	Team Pursuit
Representing England
Commonwealth Games
Bronze medal – third place	1990 Auckland	team pursuit
Silver medal – second place	1994 Victoria	team pursuit
Silver medal – second place	2002 Manchester	team pursuit

Bryan Steel (born 5 January 1969) is an English former professional racing cyclist.

== Cycling career ==
Steel represented Great Britain at the 1992, 1996, 2000 and 2004 Summer Olympics.

He represented England in the individual pursuit and won a bronze medal in the 4,000 metres team pursuit, at the 1990 Commonwealth Games in Auckland, New Zealand. Four years later, at the 1994 Commonwealth Games in Victoria, British Columbia, Canada, he won a silver medal in the team pursuit and competed in the individual pursuit. Eight years later he won a third Commonwealth Games medal when winning a silver medal in the team pursuit at the 2002 Commonwealth Games in Manchester.

== Personal life ==
Steel was born in Nottingham and now lives in Sutton near Mansfield and is involved with promoting cycling for D.A.R.E. UK.

== Palmarès ==
1994
1st Madison, British National Track Championships (with Rob Hayles)
2nd Team Pursuit, Commonwealth Games

1996
1st Madison, British National Track Championships (with Simon Lillistone)
3rd Team Pursuit, 1996 UCI Track Cycling World Cup Classics, Round, Italy
3rd Team Pursuit, 1996 UCI Track Cycling World Cup Classics, Round, Cottbus

2000
3rd Team Pursuit, Olympic Games
2nd Team Pursuit, UCI Track Cycling World Championships

2001
2nd Team Pursuit, UCI Track Cycling World Championships
3rd British National Circuit Race Championships

2002
2nd Team Pursuit, Commonwealth Games
3rd Team Pursuit, UCI Track Cycling World Championships

2003
2nd Team Pursuit, UCI Track Cycling World Championships
2nd Pursuit, British National Track Championships
3rd British National Circuit Race Championships
2nd Team Pursuit, 2003 UCI Track Cycling World Cup Classics, Round 2, Aguascalientes
2nd Team Pursuit, 2003 UCI Track Cycling World Cup Classics, Round 3, Cape Town

2004
2nd Team Pursuit, UCI Track Cycling World Championships
2nd Team Pursuit, Olympic Games
1st Team Pursuit, 2004 UCI Track Cycling World Cup Classics, Round 4, Sydney
