= Steve Paulding =

Welsh racing cyclist and cycling team manager

Personal information
- Born: 17 October 1961 (age 64) Cardiff, Wales

Cycling career
- Sport: Cycling
- Discipline: Track
- Role: Rider

Amateur teams
- 1978–1982: Cleveland Wheelers
- 1983–1995: City of Edinburgh
- 2001–2003: VC St Raphael

Steven C Paulding is a Welsh former competitive track cyclist and British Cycling track team manager. He lived in Scotland for many years, and has worked for sportscotland, the Scottish Government, Scottish Golf and currently works for British Athletics in Loughborough. He represented Wales in the 1986 and 1990 Commonwealth Games. He now lives in Leicestershire and married the commonwealth cyclist Julie Anne Forrester in October 2001.

== Palmarès ==
1985
1st Scratch Race British National Track Championships – Amateur

1986
1st Scratch Race British National Track Championships – Amateur

1989
1st Kilo British National Track Championships – Amateur
1st Cardiff Grand Prix Sprint

1990
1st Kilo British National Track Championships – Amateur

1995
1st Sprint British National Track Championships – Amateur
1st Keirin British National Track Championships
1st Team Sprint – City of Edinburgh R.C. British National Track Championships

2001
1st Masters 40-44 Sprint, British National Track Championships
1st Masters 40-44 750M TT British National Track Championships

== See also ==
- City of Edinburgh Racing Club
- Achievements of members of City of Edinburgh Racing Club
