= British Cycling National Track Championships =

Annual cycling competition

British National Track Championships
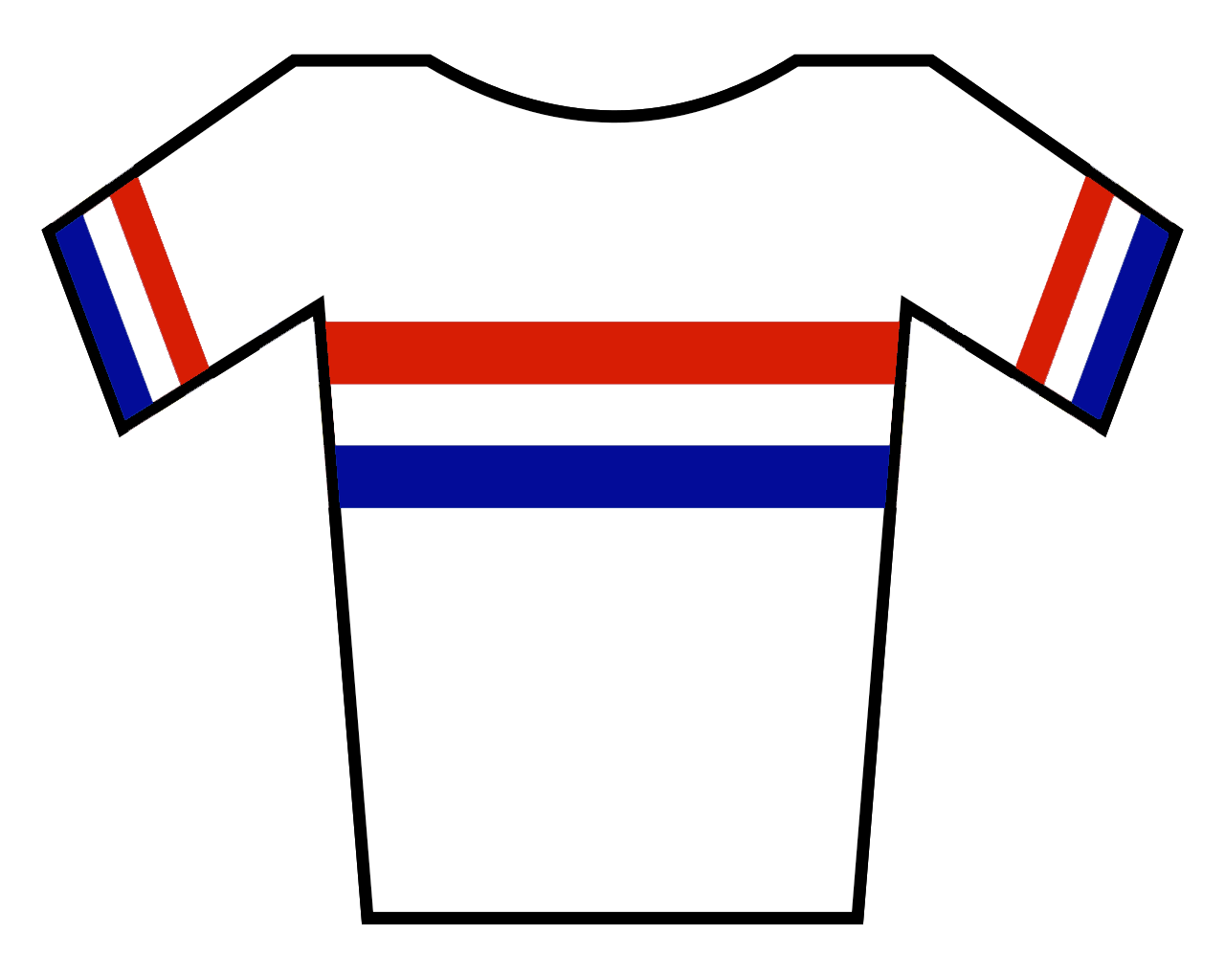
- Genre: cycling
- Frequency: annual
- Organiser: British Cycling
- 2026 British Cycling National Track Championships

The British National Track Championships are a Track cycling event held annually and organised by the national governing body for track cycling (and other forms of cycling) in Great Britain, British Cycling (formerly the British Cycling Federation). The main events are various track cycling disciplines for elite athletes to determine the British national champions. However, competitions are also held in age-grade and disability/para-cycling categories. Winners receive a national champions jersey consisting of a white jersey with blue and red bands, which they are entitled to wear any time the contest the same event during that year.

== History ==
Until 1994 both amateur and professionals could take part in the 'Open' events, in addition to specific events that were restricted to either.

The modern era is considered to have started in 1994 eventually replacing the amateur era. In November 1994, British Cycling moved its headquarters to the National Cycling Centre, Manchester, which held been opened earlier in the year by Princess Anne. Consequently, the Championships were held at Manchester Velodrome from 1995 to 2020. The 2021 Championships were cancelled due to the COVID-19 pandemic and the delayed Olympic Games and the 2022 National Championships were held at the Geraint Thomas National Velodrome in Newport, Wales.

== Venues and dates ==
- 1973–1994 (Leicester Velodrome)
- 1995–2020, 2024–2025 (Manchester Velodrome) *
- 2022–2023 (Geraint Thomas National Velodrome) *

The event was not held in the following years: 2016, 2021

== Events ==
The current championships consist of the following events:

Sprint	Endurance
Olympic events
British National Team Sprint Championships	British National Team Pursuit Championships
British National Individual Sprint Championships	British National Omnium Championships
British National Keirin Championships	British National Madison Championships
World Championship events
British National Individual Time Trial Championships	British National Scratch Championships
	British National Individual Pursuit Championships
British National Points Championships
British National Elimination Championships
Other events
British National Tandem Sprint Championships	British National Derny Championships
