= Mark Cavendish =

Manx road and track cyclist (born 1985)

Sir Mark Cavendish KBE
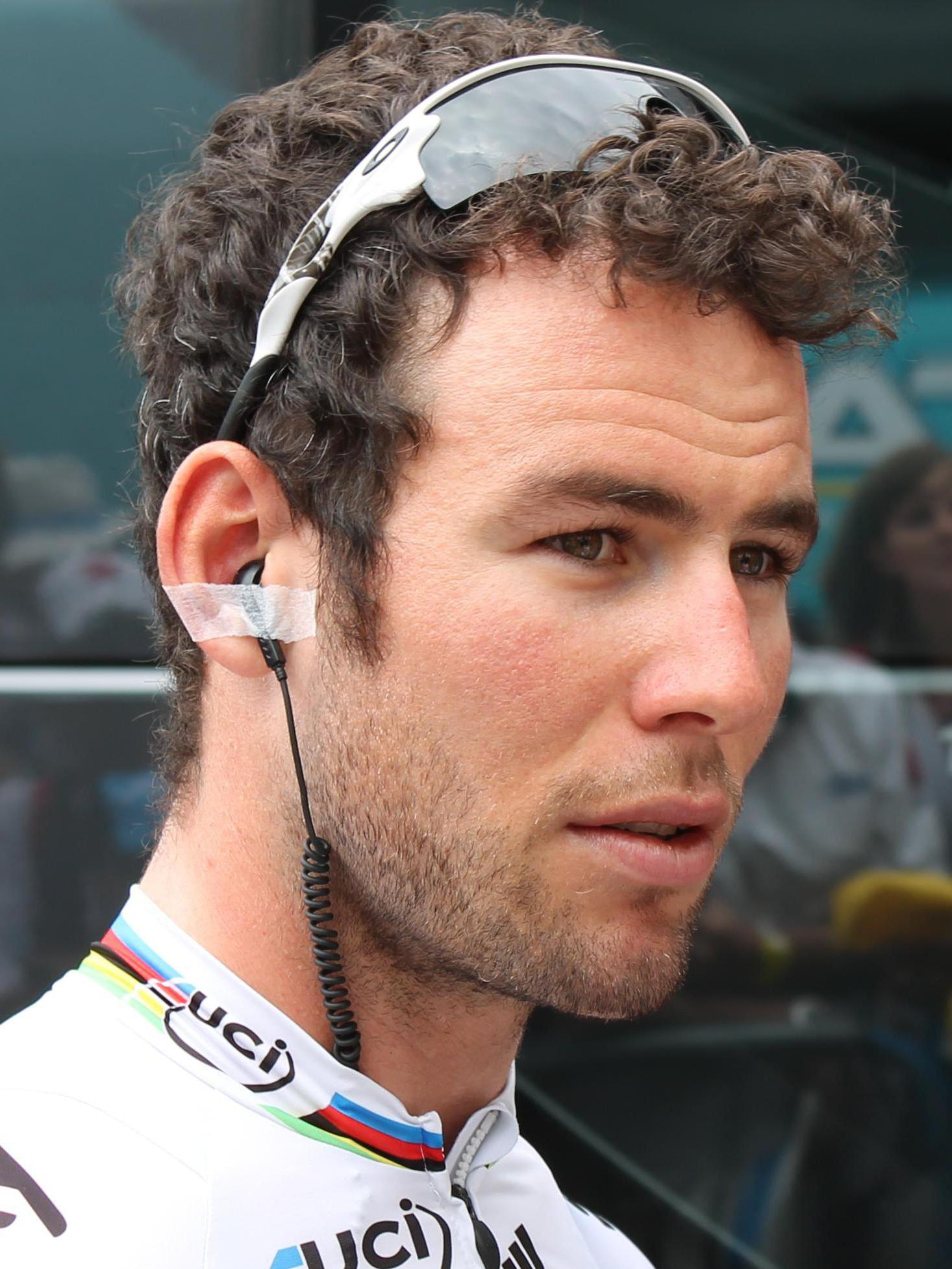
- Cavendish at the 2012 Tour de France

Personal information
- Full name: Mark Simon Cavendish
- Nickname: Manx Missile
- Born: 21 May 1985 (age 41) Douglas, Isle of Man
- Height: 1.75 m (5 ft 9 in)
- Weight: 70 kg (154 lb; 11 st 0 lb)

Cycling career
- Sport: Cycling
- Disciplines: Road; Track
- Role: Rider
- Rider type: Sprinter

Amateur team
- 2004: Team Persil

Professional teams
- 2005–2006: Team Sparkasse
- 2006–2011: T-Mobile Team
- 2012: Team Sky
- 2013–2015: Omega Pharma–Quick-Step
- 2016–2019: Team Dimension Data
- 2020: Bahrain–McLaren
- 2021–2022: Deceuninck–Quick-Step
- 2023–2024: Astana Qazaqstan Team

Major wins
- Road Grand Tours Tour de France Points classification (2011, 2021) 35 individual stages (2008–2013, 2015, 2016, 2021, 2024) Giro d'Italia Points classification (2013) 17 individual stages (2008, 2009, 2011–2013, 2022, 2023) 2 TTT stages (2009, 2011) Vuelta a España Points classification (2010) 3 individual stages (2010) 1 TTT stage (2010) Stage races Ster ZLM Toer (2012) Tour of Qatar (2013, 2016) Dubai Tour (2015) One-day races and Classics World Road Race Championships (2011) National Road Race Championships (2013, 2022) Milan–San Remo (2009) Scheldeprijs (2007, 2008, 2011) Kuurne–Brussels–Kuurne (2012, 2015) Milano–Torino (2022) Münsterland Giro (2021) Track World Championships Madison (2005, 2008, 2016)
Medal record
Men's road bicycle racing
Representing Great Britain
World Championships
| Gold medal – first place | 2011 Copenhagen | Road race |
| Silver medal – second place | 2016 Doha | Road race |
Representing Isle of Man
Island Games
| Gold medal – first place | 2003 Guernsey | Individual Criterium |
| Gold medal – first place | 2003 Guernsey | Team Road Race |
| Gold medal – first place | 2003 Guernsey | Team Time Trial |
Men's track cycling
Representing Great Britain
Olympic Games
| Silver medal – second place | 2016 Rio de Janeiro | Omnium |
World Championships
| Gold medal – first place | 2005 Los Angeles | Madison |
| Gold medal – first place | 2008 Manchester | Madison |
| Gold medal – first place | 2016 London | Madison |
Representing Isle of Man
Commonwealth Games
| Gold medal – first place | 2006 Melbourne | Scratch |

Sir Mark Simon Cavendish (born 21 May 1985) is a Manx retired professional cyclist. As a track cyclist he specialised in the madison, points race and scratch race disciplines; as a road racer he was a sprinter. He is widely considered one of the greatest road sprinters of all time.

In his first years as an elite track rider, Cavendish won gold in the madison at the 2005 and 2008 UCI Track Cycling World Championships riding for Great Britain, with Rob Hayles and Bradley Wiggins respectively, and in the scratch race at the 2006 Commonwealth Games riding for Isle of Man. After failing to win a medal at the 2008 Summer Olympics he did not compete on track again until 2015, subsequently winning his third UCI Track Cycling World Championships title with Wiggins in the madison in 2016, and an individual silver medal in the omnium at the 2016 Summer Olympics.

As a road cyclist, Cavendish turned professional in 2005 and achieved eleven wins in his first professional season. From 2008 until 2024, Cavendish won 35 Tour de France stages, putting him first on the all-time list, contributing to a third-highest total of 55 Grand Tour stage victories. He won the men's road race at the 2011 Road World Championships, becoming the second male British rider to do so after Tom Simpson. Cavendish has also won the points classification in all three of the grand tours: the 2010 Vuelta a España, the 2011 and 2021 Tour de France and the 2013 Giro d'Italia. In 2012, he became the first person to win the final Champs-Élysées stage in the Tour de France in four consecutive years.

Cavendish won seven Grand Tour stages in 2013, one in 2015 and four in 2016. This included a win on stage one of the 2016 Tour de France, claiming his first Tour de France yellow jersey. He crashed with Peter Sagan on stage four of the 2017 Tour de France, forcing him out of the race. Cavendish continued producing good results until August 2018, when he was diagnosed with Epstein–Barr virus. Before his diagnosis, Cavendish was able to compete in the 2018 Tour de France but was disqualified after not making the cut-off time on stage eleven. He returned to the Tour de France at the 2021 edition, winning four stages and his second points classification. In 2024, he claimed his 35th Tour stage win to break the overall stage victory record, previously shared with Eddy Merckx.

In the 2011 Queen's Birthday Honours, Cavendish was appointed a Member of the Order of the British Empire (MBE) "for services to British Cycling." He also won the 2011 BBC Sports Personality of the Year Award with nearly half of the votes going to him out of a field of ten nominees. In June 2024, Cavendish was awarded a Knight Commander of the Order of the British Empire (KBE) in the 2024 Birthday Honours for "services to cycling and charity work." At the end of the year he was also awarded the BBC Sports Personality of the Year Lifetime Achievement Award.

== Early life and amateur career ==
Cavendish was born in Douglas, Isle of Man, the son of David, a native of the Isle, and Adele from Yorkshire, England. He began riding BMX at an early age, racing at the National Sports Centre in Douglas.

He joined his local club in Douglas at the age of nine with his determination soon becoming apparent. "He didn't like losing", said Dot Tilbury, his former coach; "He started to win and often he would lap the other riders in the field".

He said: "I was always riding a bike, getting dropped in little races." "My mum would laugh at me, and I said it was because all my mates had mountain bikes, so I asked for a mountain bike for my thirteenth birthday and got one. The very next day I went out and beat everyone." It was at that time that Cavendish met British cyclist David Millar at a race on the Isle of Man, who was an inspiration to him. Cavendish worked in a bank for two years after leaving school to earn enough money for an attempt at a professional career.

He gained a place as one of the first six riders selected for British Cycling's Olympic Academy for junior riders in 2003 having almost been rejected because of his relatively poor performance in stationary bike tests. Coaches Rod Ellingworth, John Herety and Simon Lillistone lobbied British Cycling Performance Director Peter Keen to include him because of his potential. Although he initially struggled because of a lack of fitness, he recorded his first win in senior competition in March 2004; in the Girvan Three Day race he managed to latch back onto the lead group after being dropped over a climb before winning the finishing sprint ahead of Julian Winn. Whilst at the academy, he won two gold medals at the 2003 Island Games.

Cavendish progressed well at the academy. Ellingworth said, "Cav kind of liked it" when asked about the rigid rules and "dictatorship style" of the academy. The junior riders lived on £58 a week and financial management became a part of life at the academy as well as cooking and cleaning. Cycling Weekly described the academy as "a boot camp style training regime" controlled by Ellingworth, who, after finding out they had skipped a three-hour training ride, made the juniors complete four hours hard training at night.

He won gold in the madison with Rob Hayles at the 2005 UCI Track Cycling World Championships in Los Angeles. They had not raced together before as Hayles' usual partner, Geraint Thomas, had crashed during training a few weeks earlier—but finished one lap ahead of the field to claim the gold medal, followed by the Dutch and Belgian teams, Cavendish's first world title. Cavendish also won the points race at the UEC European Track Championships.

== Professional career ==
=== Team Sparkasse (2005–2006) ===
Cavendish turned professional in 2005 with Team Sparkasse, a feeder squad for the T-Mobile Team. During this time, he rode the Tour de Berlin and the Tour of Britain. He remained with the team into 2006, winning two stages and the points and sprint competitions in June's Tour de Berlin. He rode for the Isle of Man on the track at the Commonwealth Games in Melbourne, riding the scratch race. He lapped the field with three others: England's Rob Hayles; Ashley Hutchinson of Australia; and James McCallum of Scotland. Hayles then led him out for the sprint to win gold for the Isle of Man.

=== T-Mobile Team (2006–2011) ===
==== 2006–2007 ====
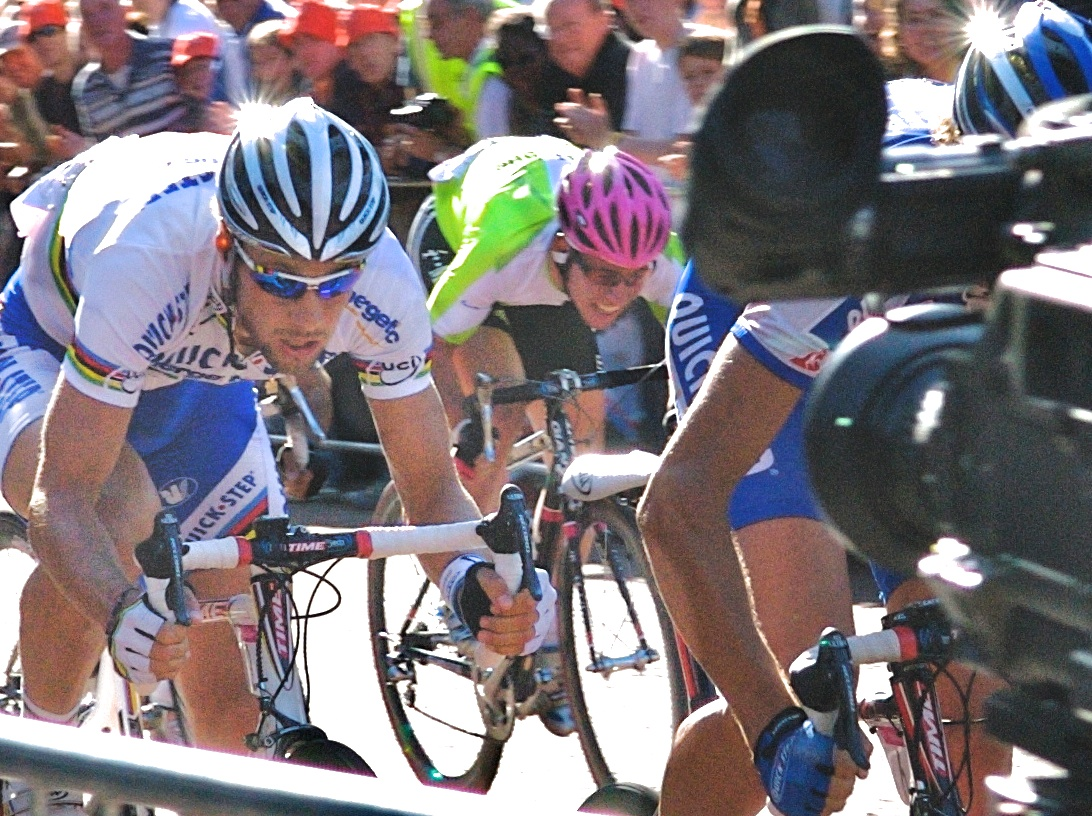
Cavendish (centre) sprinting for stage six of the 2006 Tour of Britain against Tom Boonen (left) while riding for T-Mobile Team.

His success at the 2006 Tour de Berlin led to him being a stagiaire with the T-Mobile Team from August until the end of the season. His best result on the road was in the Tour of Britain where he came second twice and third once, and won the points classification. He signed an initial two-year contract to join the team full-time from the 2007 season.

His breakthrough came at the 2007 Scheldeprijs race in Belgium, which he won. He went on to win stages at the Four Days of Dunkirk and the Volta a Catalunya leading to his selection for the Tour de France. He crashed on stages one and two and abandoned the race on stage eight as it reached the Alps. Although he had taken two top-ten placings he was unhappy not to have had a top-five placing. Cavendish took his eleventh win in early October at the Circuit Franco-Belge. Among the wins were three in UCI ProTour events—two in the Volta a Catalunya and one in the Eneco Tour.

==== 2008 ====
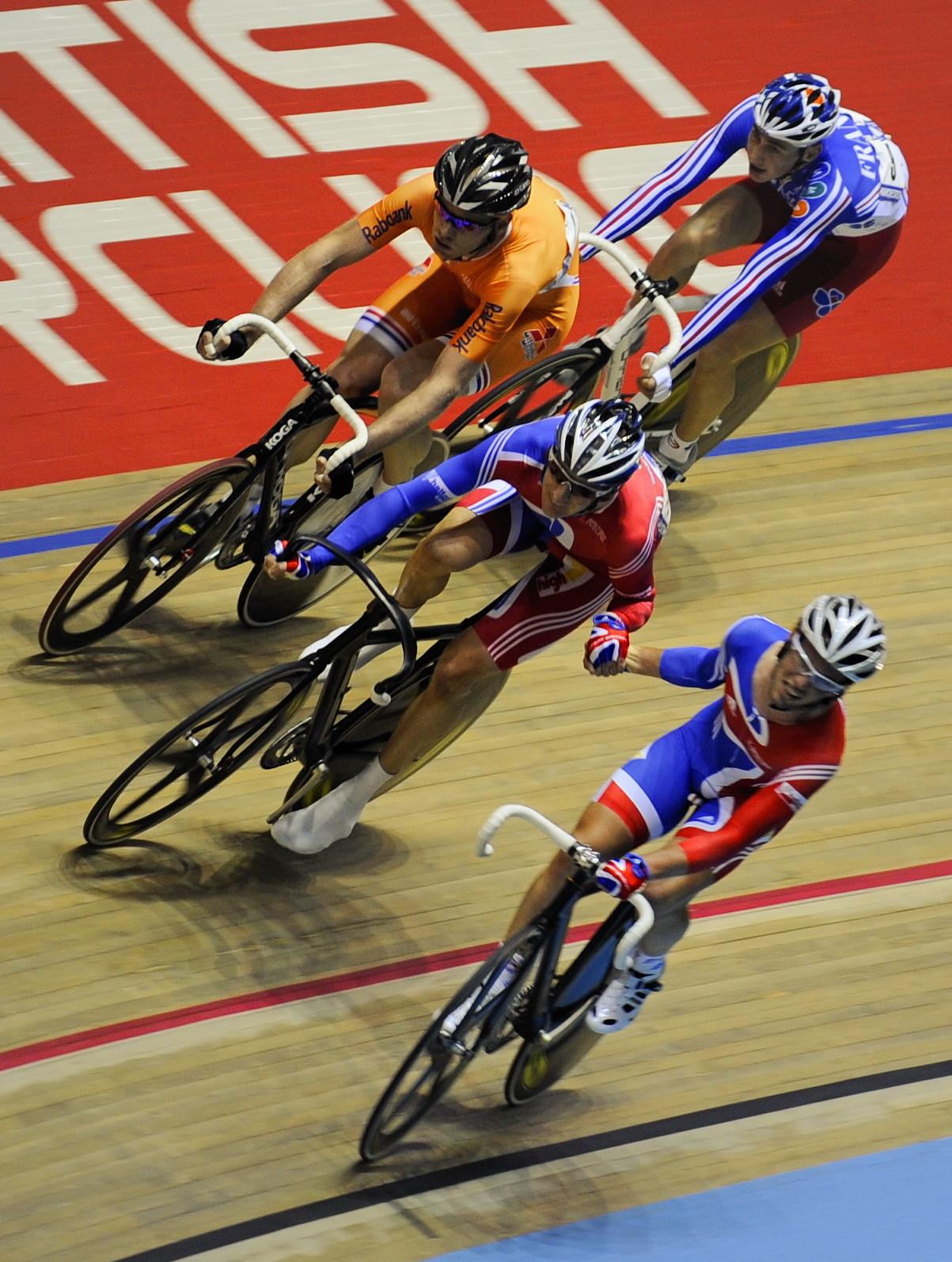
Cavendish (foreground) handing over to Bradley Wiggins, at the 2008 UCI Track Cycling World Championships in Manchester.

In 2008, Cavendish returned to the track for the UCI Track Cycling World Championships in Manchester. Cavendish was brought in to partner Bradley Wiggins in the madison, as Hayles failed a routine blood test, and was subsequently banned. At around halfway through the race they appeared to be out of contention, with their closest rivals all gaining a lap. With thirty-five laps left to race, Wiggins launched an attack which helped them reach the field ten laps later. They took the lead due to the superior points they had collected in the sprints. They held on to win the gold medal, finishing with nineteen points, ahead of Germany on thirteen.

On the road, Cavendish won his first stages of a Grand Tour with two victories in the Giro d'Italia and four stages in the Tour de France, the first of which was on stage five. He won also stages eight, twelve and thirteen. After stage fourteen, Cavendish abandoned the Tour to concentrate on the Olympics in Beijing. He paired with Wiggins in the madison, and as the reigning world champions, they were favourites for the gold medal but finished ninth. Cavendish felt Wiggins had not performed to the best of his ability in the madison. The rest of his season was successful, with a total of eleven further race wins, including three each at the Tour of Ireland and the Tour of Missouri where he won his only points classification of the season. At the Tour de Romandie, he won the opening time trial, beating compatriot Wiggins and emphasising his short-distance time-trial abilities.

==== 2009 ====
Cavendish's 2009 season began at the Tour of Qatar, where he renewed his rivalry with Quick-Step's Tom Boonen. Boonen won the race and one stage, though Cavendish took two stages. He also won two stages at the Tour of California, again beating Boonen in the sprint finishes. The Tour of California also saw him win his first points of classification of the 2009 season. He was a surprise inclusion on the British squad for the 2009 UCI Track Cycling World Championships, where he competed in the scratch race and the madison, failing to pick up medals in either. He took up the European season at Tirreno–Adriatico, the Italian one-week stage race, winning one stage. He then entered his first classic race, Milan–San Remo, where he tracked down Cervélo TestTeam rider Heinrich Haussler in the last 200 metres (220 yd) narrowly winning the sprint and the race—Cavendish's first victory in a race known as one of the five cycling monuments.

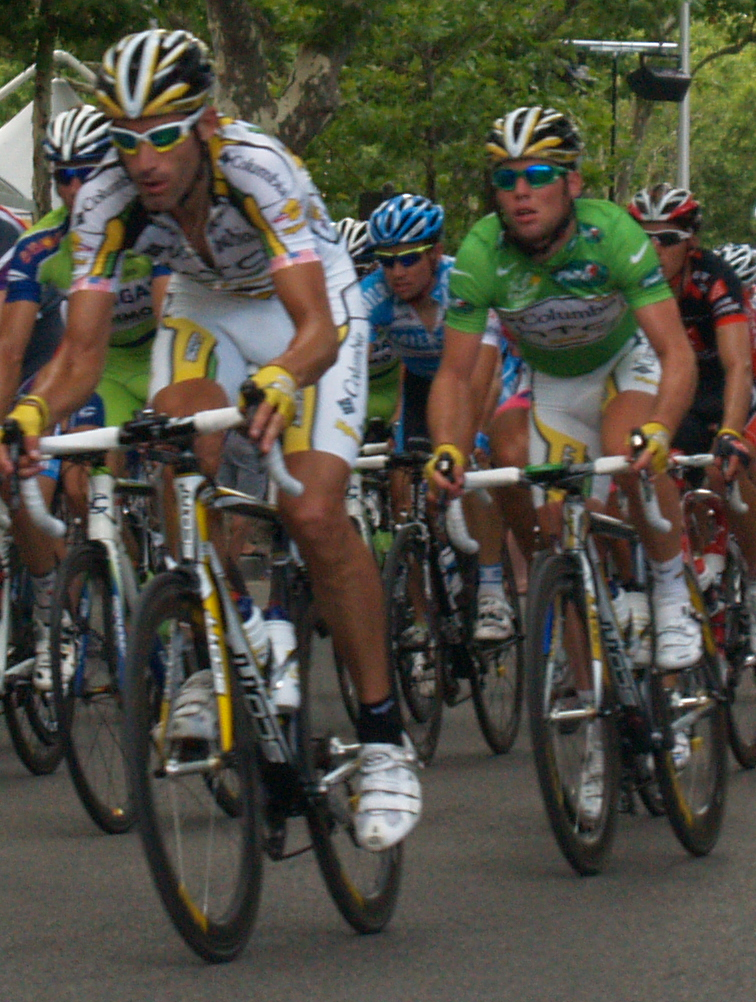
George Hincapie and Cavendish during stage three of the 2009 Tour de France.

Cavendish repeated his 2008 two-stage victory at the Three Days of De Panne, also winning the points classification. At the start of the Giro d'Italia Team Columbia–High Road won the team time trial and Cavendish was given the pink leader's jersey, becoming the first Manx rider to wear it. The first two road stages were fruitless for Cavendish, as he was beaten to the line by Alessandro Petacchi in the first stage, before he was caught behind a crash and failed to make it back for the sprint the next day. After this, Cavendish took three stage wins before abandoning it after stage thirteen, citing a need to rest in preparation for the Tour de France. He continued his preparation by racing the Tour de Suisse where he won stages three and six.

During the season, Cavendish developed a partnership with his lead out man, Mark Renshaw. Continuing his run of success, he won stages two, three, ten, eleven, nineteen and twenty-one of the Tour de France. In winning the third stage, he became the first Briton to hold the green jersey two days in a row. Cavendish's stage eleven win enabled him to reclaim the green jersey from rival Thor Hushovd of Cervélo TestTeam. It also equalled Barry Hoban's British record of eight stage wins. Winning stage nineteen, Cavendish set a new record for Tour de France stage wins by a British rider. In winning the last stage, he led home a one–two for his team, as his teammate and lead out man, Renshaw, finished second on the Champs-Élysées.

Following on from the Tour de France, Cavendish won the Sparkassen Giro Bochum and took part in the Tour of Ireland, winning stage two. In September he recorded the fiftieth win of his road racing career in a sprint finish in the opening stage of the Tour of Missouri. Before the race he confirmed he would remain with Team Columbia–HTC in 2010, ending speculation that he was moving to the newly created British team, Team Sky. Cavendish retained the leader's jersey by sprinting to victory in stage two but finished fifth in stage three, losing the overall lead to Hushovd. A lung infection forced him to withdraw from the race before stage four. Although selected for the British team for the road race at the UCI Road World Championships, his illness prevented him from taking part.

==== 2010 ====
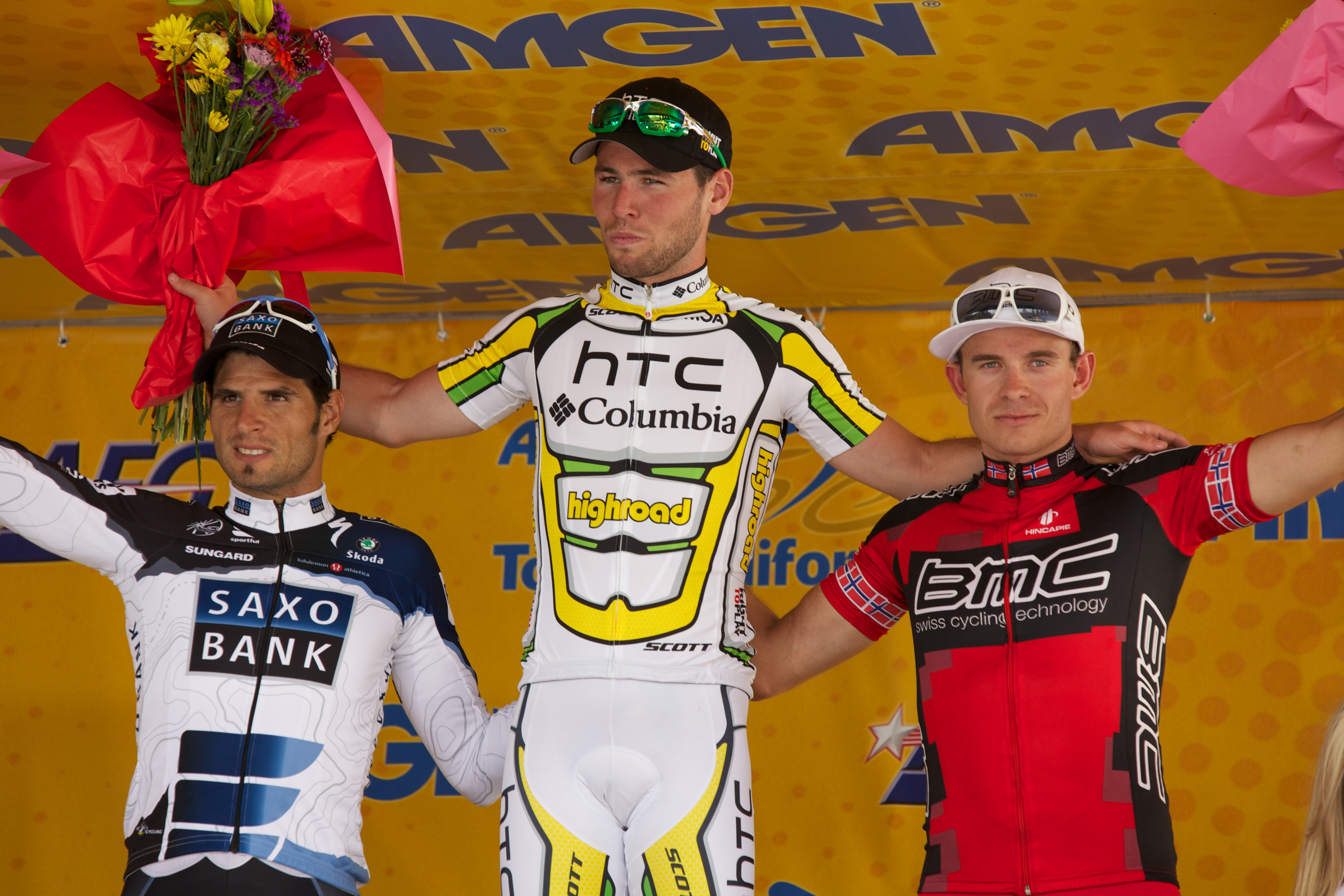
Cavendish celebrating at the opening stage of the 2010 Tour of California, with Juan José Haedo of Team Saxo Bank and Alexander Kristoff of BMC Racing Team, second and third respectively.

After a dental problem, Cavendish delayed the start of his 2010 season until the Vuelta a Andalucía in mid-February. Following the lay off, he failed to defend his victory at Milan–San Remo, coming in six minutes behind the winner in eighty-ninth place. His pre-season goals were to win the green jersey in the Tour de France and win the road race at the UCI Road World Championships. Cavendish raced in the Tour of Flanders for the first time but only to work for a teammate and gain experience. He was involved in a crash and did not finish. He found form at the Volta a Catalunya, finishing seventh in the time-trial and winning stage two. His team withdrew Cavendish from the Tour de Romandie for making an offensive gesture after winning the second stage. Missing the Giro d'Italia, he chose instead to compete at the Tour of California starting in May, where he won stage one for his third victory of the season. In June, Cavendish crashed heavily whilst sprinting in the closing metres of stage four of the Tour de Suisse. He appeared to veer off line and brought down Haussler and several other riders, raising criticism from other teams regarding his riding style.

Cavendish entered the Tour de France. During stage one, he crashed out of the final sprint, with just under 3 kilometres (1.9 miles) remaining in the stage. Overhead camera footage showed him failing to negotiate a corner after entering too fast and turning too late. He then leaned his shoulder into a fellow rider as he travelled away from the racing line. Cavendish returned to form by winning stages five, six, eleven, eighteen and twenty, bringing his career total to fifteen Tour de France stage wins. He ended up second in the points classification, eleven points behind Petacchi. Cavendish's next race was the Vuelta a España. His team won the team time trial with Cavendish finishing first, taking the leader's jersey. He could place only second or third in the subsequent sprint stages but in the second half of the race, he won stages twelve, thirteen, eighteen and ultimately won the points classification.

==== 2011 ====
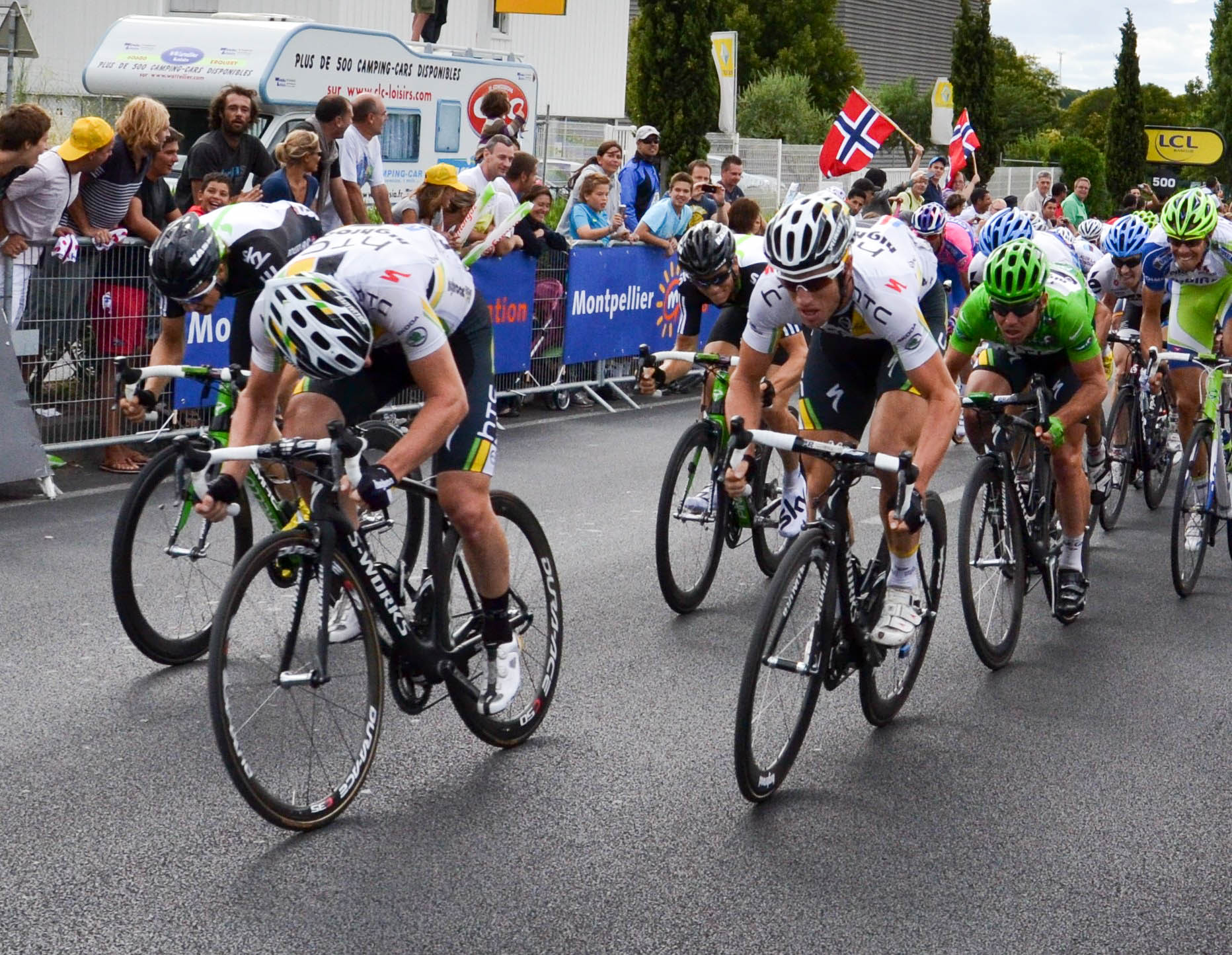
Cavendish (in the green jersey), being led out by teammates Matthew Goss and Mark Renshaw on stage fifteen of the 2011 Tour de France.

Cavendish had a slow start to 2011 failing to win a race until late February when he won stage six of the Tour of Oman. His second victory of the season came in the Scheldeprijs, with his third win in the race matching the record of Petrus Oellibrandt, following his wins in 2007 and 2008. Having failed to finish at Paris–Roubaix, Cavendish came second in the second stage of the Giro d'Italia to take the pink jersey in contentious circumstances, gesturing at stage winner Petacchi for appearing to move across his path in the final sprint. Cavendish got his first Grand Tour stage victory of the year by winning stage ten of the Giro d'Italia, denying claims that he had illegally held on to his team car when climbing Mount Etna on stage nine. He also won stage twelve prior to leaving the race. In June, it was announced that Cavendish was appointed a Member of the Order of the British Empire (MBE) in the 2011 Birthday Honours. He won stages five, seven, eleven, fifteen and twenty-one of the Tour de France—bringing his total to twenty career Tour de France stage wins. He also became the first person to win the final stage three years in succession. Despite being docked twenty points each time for finishing outside the time limit after stages nine and eighteen, Cavendish ultimately became the first British rider to win the points classification.

Over the following weeks, Cavendish took part in the post-Tour criteriums. He won the Stiphout Criterium in The Netherlands, beating brothers Andy and Fränk Schleck of Leopard Trek to the line. He then won the Profcriterium Wolvertem-Meise, followed by the Wateringse Wielerdag. In August, Cavendish's team HTC–Highroad announced they would fold at the end of the season, fuelling speculation that Cavendish would move to Team Sky. The following week, racing for team Great Britain, he won the London–Surrey Cycle Classic, the official test event for the road race at the 2012 Summer Olympics and part of the London Prepares series. Less than a week later, Cavendish started the Vuelta a España, but abandoned it during stage four due to the searing heat. After withdrawing from the Vuelta a España, Cavendish was allowed to be a late addition to the line up of the Tour of Britain. Cavendish won stage one in Dumfries to take the leader's jersey, and the final stage in London.

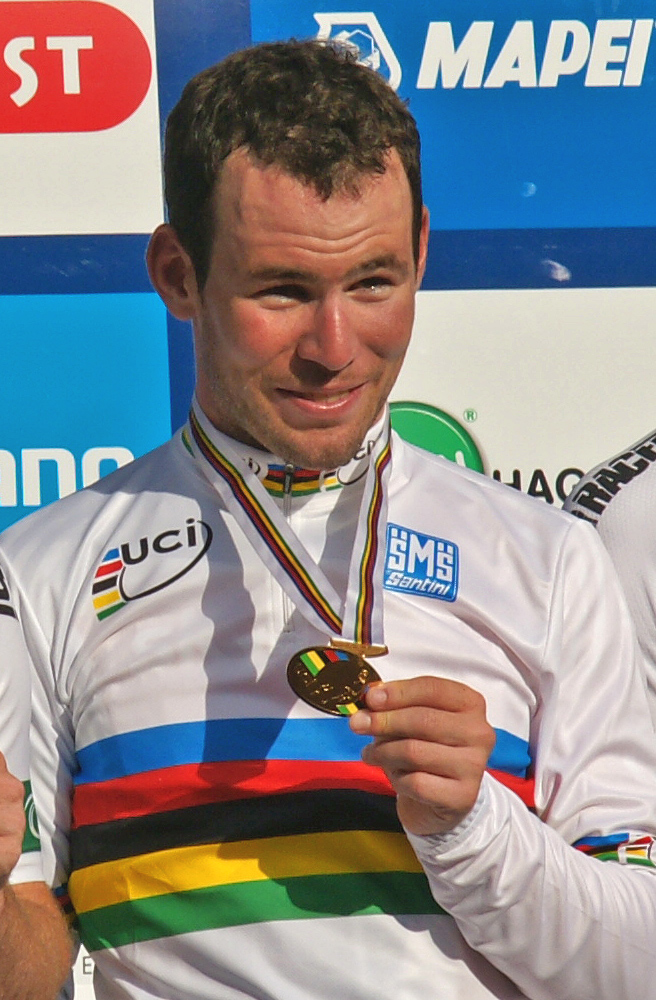
Cavendish on the podium after his victory in the road race at the 2011 UCI Road World Championships

At the end of September, Cavendish went to the UCI Road World Championships in Copenhagen as part of an eight-rider British team for the road race. After the team controlled the whole race it came down to a sprint finish with Cavendish crossing the line in first place taking the rainbow jersey, to become the second British male UCI world champion after Tom Simpson in 1965. In November, Cavendish returned to the track, competing in the Revolution event at Manchester Velodrome. He won the scratch race, his first track win since 2008. He announced he was starting his training for the 2012 season earlier than in previous years, with the aim of being more competitive in the Classics. In November, he won the 2011 Most Inspirational Sportsman of the Year Award at the Jaguar Academy of Sport Annual Awards. In December, Cavendish won the BBC Sports Personality of the Year Award with approximately half of the votes cast, ahead of Mo Farah and Darren Clarke.

=== Team Sky (2012) ===
Amid much speculation, it was announced in October 2011 that Cavendish would join Team Sky for the 2012 season along with HTC–Highroad teammate Bernhard Eisel. Cavendish began his 2012 season at the Tour of Qatar. After recovering from illness, he won stage three—his first victory for Team Sky. He won stage five later in the week, moving back into the top ten of the overall classification. He finished the race in sixth place, despite crashing on the final stage. Although he did not win any stages at the Tour of Oman, having suffered an injury in the first stage, he returned to win Kuurne–Brussels–Kuurne. Cavendish targeted a second victory in Milan–San Remo in March, but was dropped on Le Manie, 100 kilometres (62 miles) from the finish. He did not manage to finish high up in the remaining Classics. In the Tour de Romandie, he showed his ability in short time trials by finishing third in the prologue but did not take any stage wins.

A week later, Cavendish took his fifth win of the season by winning the sprint on stage two of the Giro d'Italia. The following day, he was again in contention for victory on stage three, but in the sprint, Androni Giocattoli–Venezuela's Roberto Ferrari aggressively switched lanes, clipping Cavendish and sending him to the ground, causing other riders to fall including overall leader Taylor Phinney (BMC Racing Team). Cavendish later tweeted that Ferrari should be "ashamed to take out Pink, Red & World Champ jerseys". He recovered from minor injuries to win stages five and thirteen. Cavendish completed the Giro d'Italia, but lost the points classification to Team Katusha's Joaquim Rodríguez by a single point. He did win the minor Azzurri d'Italia and stage combativeness classifications. In mid-June, Cavendish competed in the Ster ZLM Toer and despite failing to win any of the four mostly flat stages, Cavendish's consistency ensured that he won the overall general classification—the first of his professional career—by eight seconds.

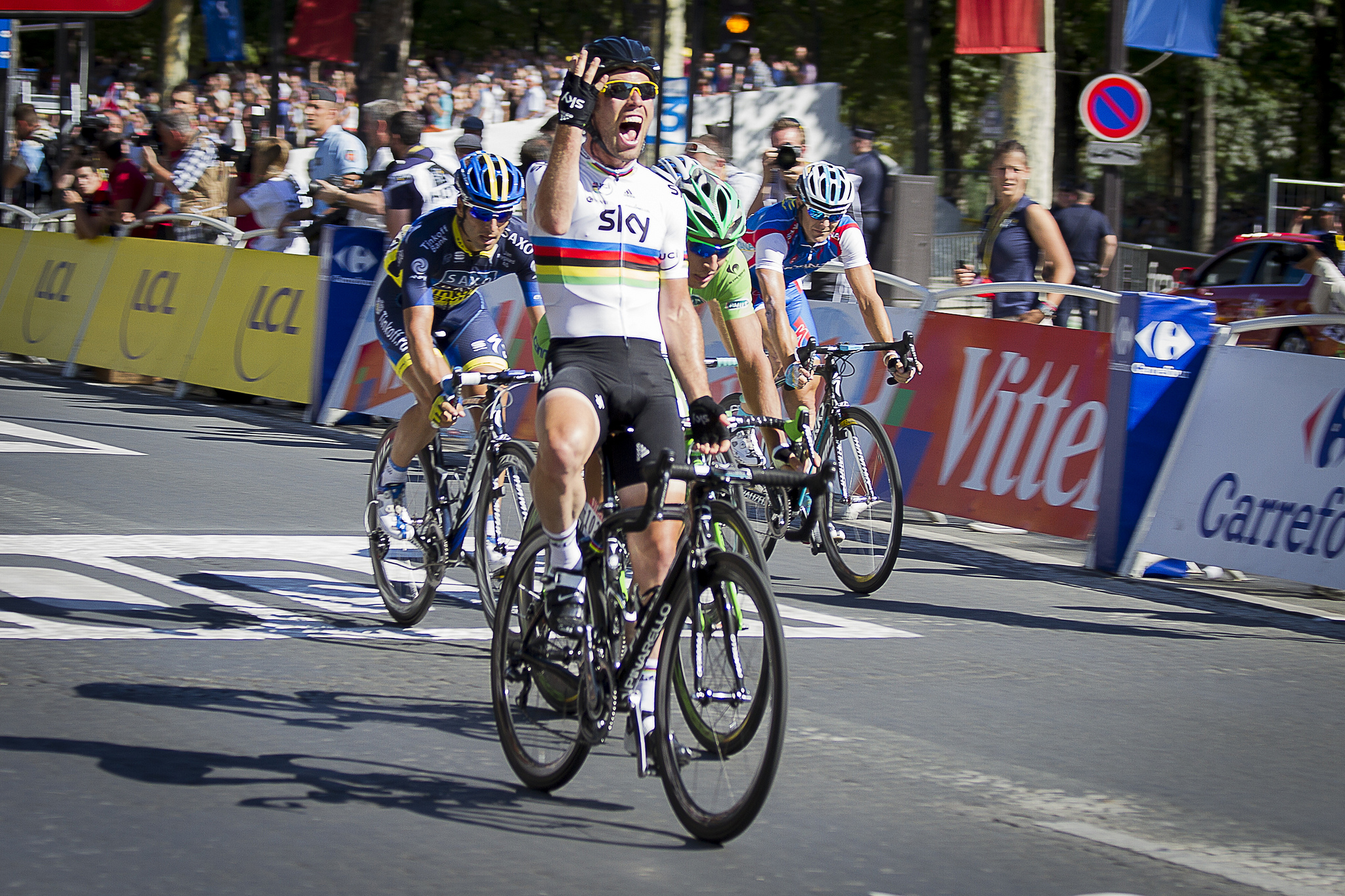
Cavendish won the final stage of the 2012 Tour de France on the Champs-Élysées, for a record fourth successive year.

In July, Cavendish won stage two of the Tour de France, his twenty-first tour stage win. Cavendish was in contention for another stage victory on stage four, but was taken out in a large crash in the final 3 kilometres (1.9 miles). He then took on a supporting role as Team Sky attempted to win the overall race with Wiggins. He was seen carrying bottles for teammates and setting the pace on a Pyrenean climb. The team repaid Cavendish for his hard work by helping chase down a breakaway on stage eighteen, although Cavendish alone had to chase down Rabobank rider Luis León Sánchez and Nicolas Roche of Ag2r–La Mondiale in the last 200 metres (220 yd) to take his 22nd Tour stage win, equalling André Darrigade. Cavendish won the final stage of the Tour de France on the Champs-Élysées for a record fourth successive year—the most successful sprinter in Tour history with twenty-three stage wins. He also became the first person to win on the Champs-Élysées in the rainbow jersey. During the Tour, French newspaper L'Équipe named Cavendish the Tour de France's best sprinter of all time.

Cavendish's main target for the season was the road race at the Olympics, which was held six days after the final stage of the Tour de France. A strong British squad of Wiggins, Chris Froome, Ian Stannard and Millar was assembled around Cavendish. The team aimed to control the race and allow him to take a sprint victory on The Mall. The team were forced to set the pace for the majority of the race, with few nations offering any support, and on the final climb of the Box Hill circuit, a large breakaway group of over thirty riders formed. Despite the best efforts of Stannard, Wiggins, Millar, Froome and Eisel, the breakaway could not be brought back leaving Cavendish to finish twenty-ninth, forty seconds behind the winner, Alexander Vinokourov of Kazakhstan. He then won three stages of the Tour of Britain, winning in Dumfries, Blackpool and Guildford.

=== Omega Pharma–Quick-Step (2013–2015) ===
In October 2012, he signed a three-year contract with Belgian team Omega Pharma–Quick-Step from the 2013 season.

==== 2013 ====
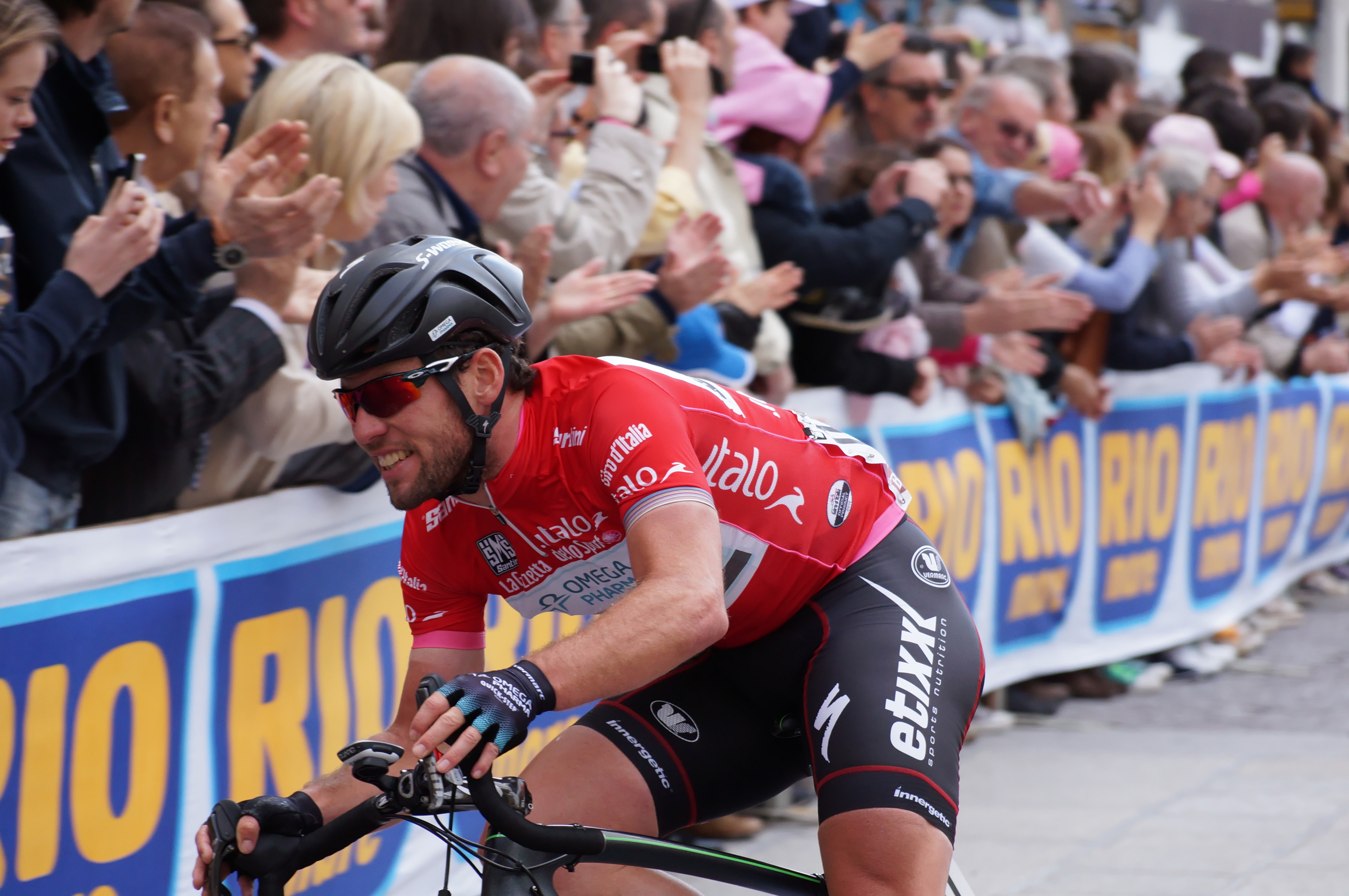
Cavendish won the red jersey at the 2013 Giro d'Italia, becoming one of only five riders to win the points classification in all three Grand Tours.

He started the 2013 season by winning the opening stage of the Tour de San Luis in Argentina on his début for Omega Pharma–Quick-Step. He then went on to win the Tour of Qatar, with four consecutive stage victories out of six. In March, he won the second stage of the Three Days of De Panne. In April he finished in second place to defending champion Marcel Kittel of Argos–Shimano at the Scheldeprijs; he faded in the final kilometre, but recovered to launch his sprint from around twenty riders back with 200 metres (220 yd) remaining. In May, Cavendish won the opening stage of the Giro d'Italia, taking the pink jersey for the third time in his career. He went on to win stage six from a bunch sprint after a pan-flat stage. This victory moved him above Robert Millar to the top of Cycling Weekly's all-time ranking of British professional riders. He also won stage twelve, claiming his 100th professional victory and reclaiming the lead in the points classification. The next day, he timed his finish perfectly to win stage thirteen, his fourth victory of the 2013 race. His fifth victory of the Giro came on the final stage, wrapping up the points classification which he had led for much of the race. By doing so, Cavendish became only the fifth rider to win the points classification in all three Grand Tours.

In June, Cavendish won the British National Road Race Championships, held around a circuit in Glasgow city centre. He overtook David Millar on the home straight and held off a challenge by Ian Stannard, who recovered from a puncture in the penultimate lap to claim silver. In July, he won stage five of the Tour de France, giving him twenty-four career Tour stage wins. He was greeted on the line by André Darrigade, the previous record holder for most Tour stages won by a sprinter. In the eleventh stage, a 33-kilometre (21-mile) individual time trial, a spectator doused Cavendish with urine. On stage 13 from Tours to Saint-Amand-Montrond, he rode with a 14-man breakaway with 30 kilometres (19 miles) to go and out-sprinted Peter Sagan to win the stage—his 25th Tour de France stage win. Later that month Cavendish decided to ride the Danmark Rundt, winning the race's final stage. In September, he returned to the track for the first time since the 2008 Summer Olympics in Beijing, competing in the International Belgian Open in Ghent. Finishing second in the scratch race and third in the madison with Owain Doull, Cavendish had not ruled out the prospect of competing in the 2016 Summer Olympics in Rio de Janeiro having earned enough points to qualify for the UCI Track Cycling World Cup Classics. Returning to the road, Cavendish won stage four of the Tour of Britain, outsprinting Elia Viviani in Llanberis. He repeated the win three days later, again out-sprinting Viviani to take stage seven in Guildford. He also won the final stage in London the next day.

==== 2014–2015 ====
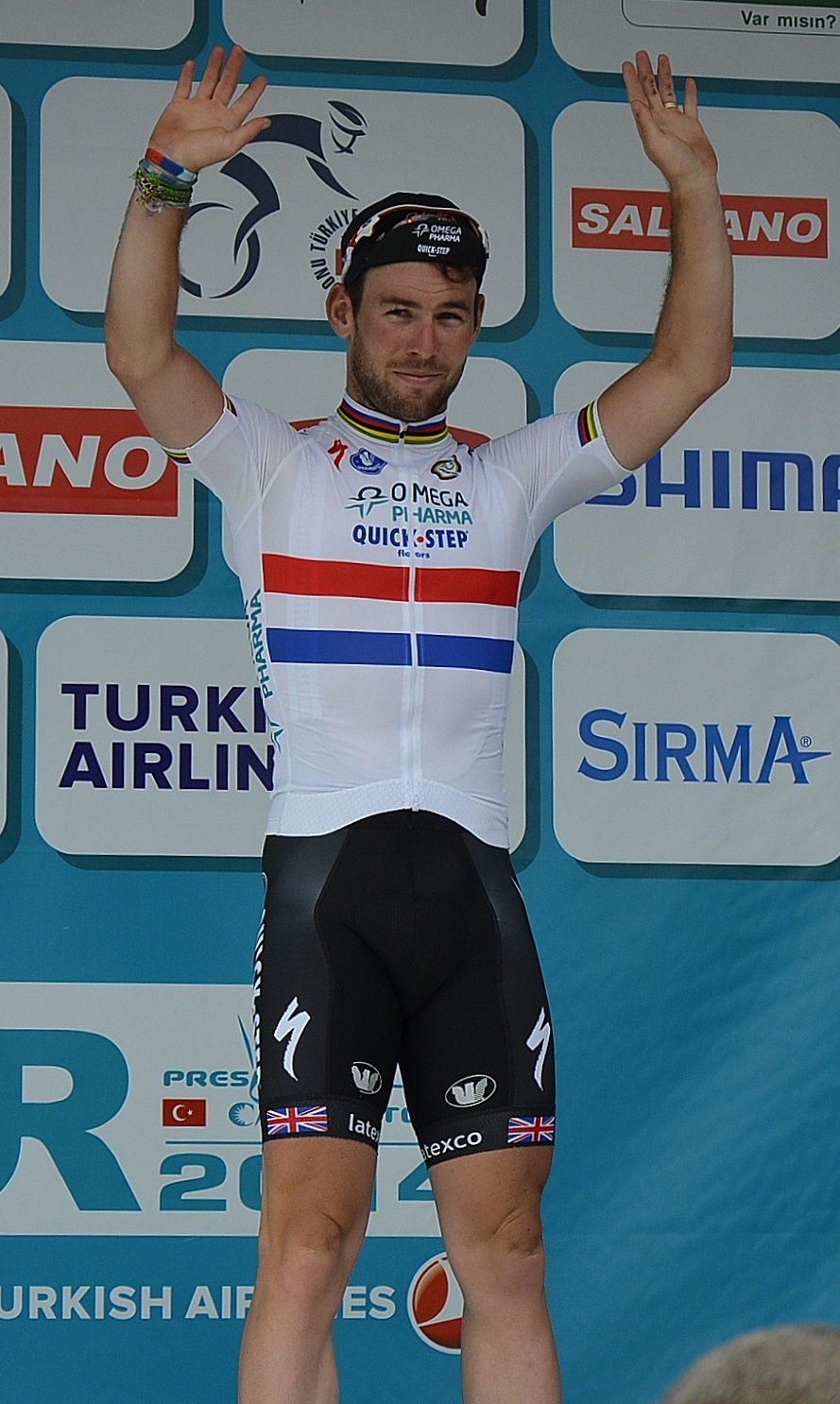
Cavendish at the 2014 Tour of Turkey.

Despite stage wins at the start of the 2014 season at the Volta ao Algarve and Tirreno–Adriatico, Cavendish decided not to compete in the Giro d'Italia. His best Classics result was a fifth place in Milan–San Remo, having been a favourite for the race. He won four stages and the points classification at the Tour of Turkey. In the first stage of the Tour de France, which started in Yorkshire, England, from Leeds to Harrogate, Cavendish crashed out during a collision he caused in the final few seconds of the sprint finish. He suffered a separated right shoulder and did not start the next stage. He came back to competition at the Tour de l'Ain, where he was winless. He then showed some form at the Tour du Poitou-Charentes, winning the first two stages. Cavendish competed in the Tour of Britain in September, coming third in the first stage in Liverpool and second in the final stage in London. Overall, his 2014 season proved to be one of his least successful, winning eleven races but gaining no Grand Tour stage wins. Cavendish ended 2014 competing on the track, taking second place at the Six Days of Ghent and winning the Six Days of Zurich, both with Iljo Keisse. He later ruled out an attempt to enter the track cycling competitions at the 2016 Summer Olympics due to his road commitments.

In contrast to 2014, he had a successful start to the 2015 season. He won five races by mid-February, including two stages, the points classification and the general classification at the Dubai Tour. In March, Cavendish won Kuurne–Brussels–Kuurne, for the second time in his career. He then participated in Tirreno–Adriatico, where he was involved in a large crash on stage two due to Elia Viviani clipping his back wheel and causing his chain to drop. Cavendish next raced at the Tour of Turkey, where he won three stages and the points classification ahead of Daniele Ratto. Cavendish then participated in the Tour of California, showing good form by winning four stages and the points classification ahead of overall winner Sagan. His Tour de Suisse was unsuccessful; the best place he managed was sixth on stage six. At the Tour de France, Cavendish won stage seven by taking André Greipel's wheel before passing him in a sprint finish in Fougères, his first stage win at the race since 2013 and twenty-sixth overall. Cavendish returned to the track in August, winning the madison with Bradley Wiggins in the first round of the Revolution cycling series at the newly opened Derby Arena. It was the first time the pair had contested the madison together since the 2008 Olympics.

=== Team Dimension Data (2016–2019) ===
In September 2015, it was announced that Cavendish had signed for MTN–Qhubeka – to be renamed as Team Dimension Data – for the 2016 season, along with his Etixx–Quick-Step teammate Renshaw and Eisel, his former teammate from HTC–Highroad and Sky. The team principal, Douglas Ryder, described the move as "a big step forward for the team."

==== 2016 ====
In February, Cavendish rode the Tour of Qatar, taking the opening stage and the general classification for the second time. Cavendish wanted to win a medal at the Olympics in the omnium. In preparation he competed at the UCI Track Cycling World Championships; he placed sixth in the omnium, and won the madison with Bradley Wiggins. In April he rode the Tour of Croatia, winning stage two. On 2 July, he won the opening stage of the Tour de France in a sprint finish at Utah Beach, taking his twenty-seventh stage win, and donning the yellow jersey for the first time. He lost the jersey the following day when Sagan won stage two. Cavendish won stage 3 in a photo finish with André Greipel in Angers, equalling Bernard Hinault's tally of 28 stage wins and put him in the lead of points classification. He won stage six in a bunch sprint at Montauban, ahead of Marcel Kittel and Daniel McLay, to increase his lead. Cavendish lost the green jersey on the tenth stage, when Sagan was part of a breakaway that led the race until the end – while also finishing second to Michael Matthews at the finish line in Revel and won the stage's intermediate sprint. Cavendish went on to take his fourth stage of the race, and his thirtieth Tour de France stage victory on stage fourteen, passing Alexander Kristoff and Sagan at the finish at Parc des Oiseaux in Villars-les-Dombes. He quit the race on the second rest day before the mountainous stages citing his need to prepare for the Olympics.

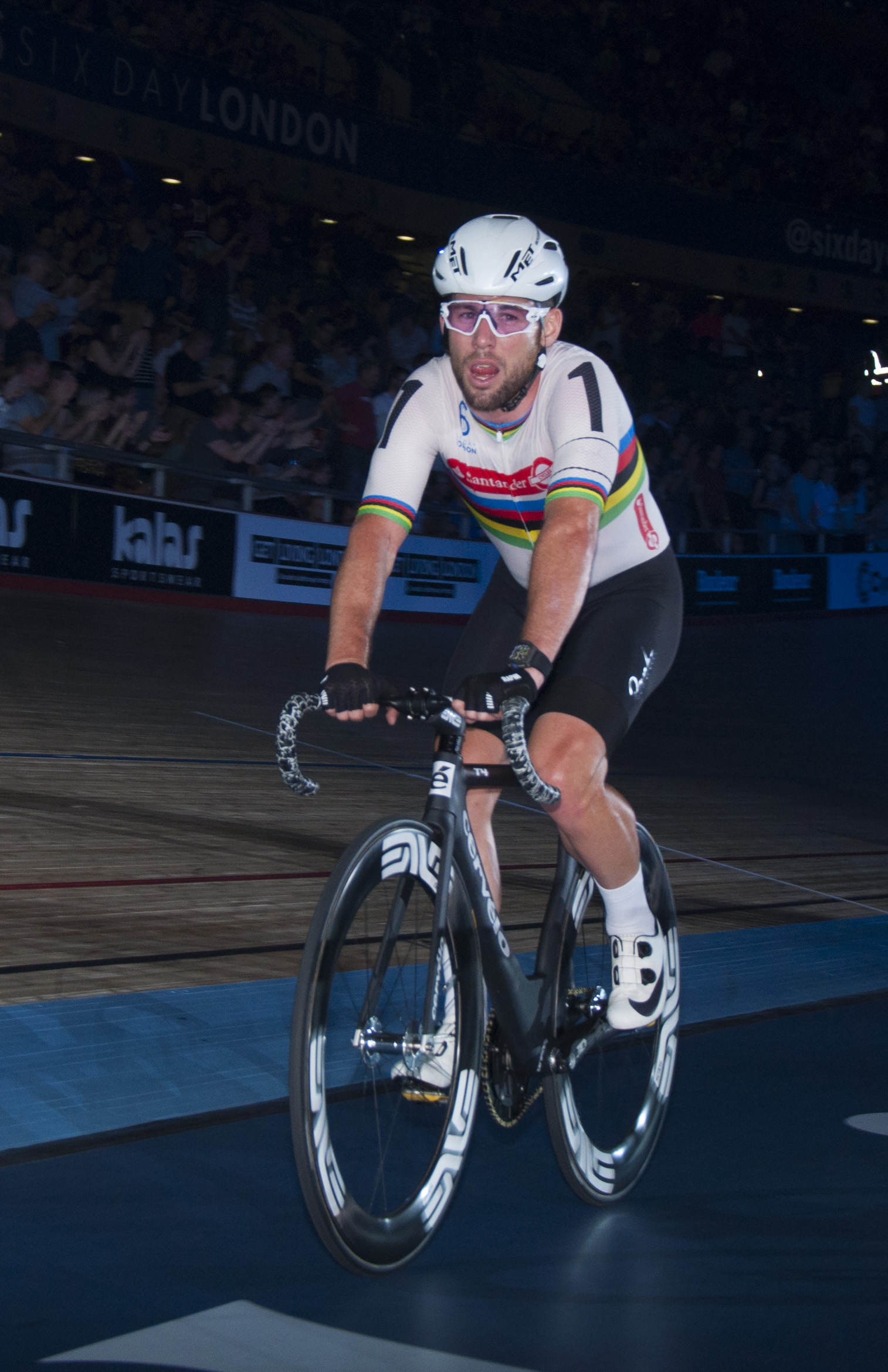
Cavendish at the 2016 Six Days of London

Having competed in two previous Olympics, Cavendish finally won his first medal, finishing second in the men's omnium. Returning to the roads, Cavendish was seen to be one of the favourites for the road race at the UCI Road World Championships in Qatar, but was out-sprinted for the victory by Sagan and finished with the silver medal, a result that left him "disappointed". He concluded his road season with two stage wins and the points classification at the Abu Dhabi Tour, after which he returned to track racing, teaming up with Bradley Wiggins to race the Six Days of London. The pair narrowly lost to Kenny De Ketele and Moreno De Pauw in the final moments of the sixth day, finishing in second position overall. The pair went on to race at the Six Days of Ghent, this time beating De Ketele and De Pauw to take the overall victory.

==== 2017 ====
After not winning any stages in his opening race, the Dubai Tour, he won the opening stage of the third event of the UCI World Tour, the Abu Dhabi Tour. In April, he was diagnosed with Epstein–Barr virus, preventing him from racing until mid-June. In a 2021 interview, Cavendish stated that his health was compromised by being told by doctors that he was fit to train again when Epstein–Barr was still in his system, leading to him reducing his intake of food to make his racing weight and eventually to a deterioration in his mental health and clinical depression.

Cavendish was back to form by the Tour de France, where he was involved in an incident with reigning World Champion Peter Sagan during the finish of stage four which resulted in Cavendish crashing into the barriers. He suffered a fractured shoulder blade, after landing on his right shoulder which he had dislocated three years earlier and withdrew from the race. Sagan was later disqualified as it appeared he had struck Cavendish with an elbow. In response, Cavendish said he was friendly with Sagan but he was not "a fan of him putting his elbow in". Rob Hayles, a former professional cyclist, said Cavendish was already heading into the barriers before Sagan put his elbow out. He also claimed no contact occurred between the two cyclists. Others shared Hayles' opinion, stating it was more Cavendish's fault for attempting to squeeze through a small gap than Sagan's. Race officials said Sagan "endangered some of his colleagues seriously" in the sprint. After a low-key return to the roads at September's Tour of Britain, Cavendish rode in the Six Days of London, finishing second overall with Peter Kennaugh.

==== 2018 ====
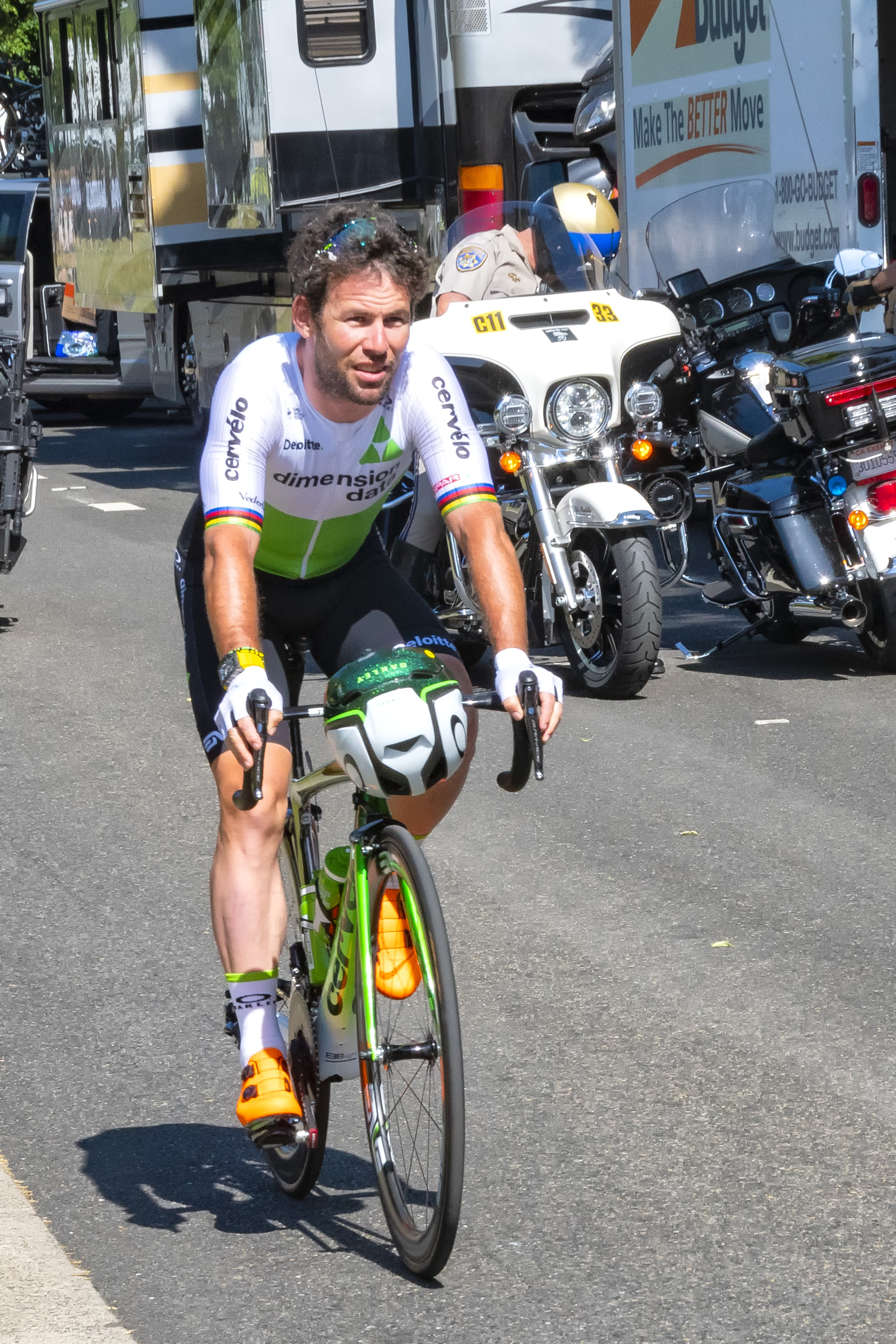
Cavendish in 2018

Cavendish began his 2018 season at the Dubai Tour, winning stage three. He then raced the Tour of Oman, placing second on the opening stage. He then went on to start the Abu Dhabi Tour, only to crash in the neutralised zone of the first stage. He fell on the shoulder he fractured at the previous year's Tour de France and was forced to abandon the race. He returned to action at Tirreno–Adriatico, but suffered another crash during the opening team time trial. He fractured a rib, and despite getting back on his bike missed the time cut, and was unable to continue in the race. Cavendish was fit to start Milan–San Remo, but crashed heavily into a bollard in the final 10 kilometres (6.2 miles) as the peloton approached the crucial Poggio di San Remo climb. He suffered another fractured rib, bruising and abrasions, as well as a possible ankle ligament injury. He rode the Tour de France, but finished outside of the time limit on stage 11 by more than 34 minutes. Cavendish was due to start the road race at the European Road Championships in Glasgow, but pulled out on the advice of his medical team, due to a number of injuries earlier in the season. Cavendish said that it was "incredibly disappointing".

==== 2019 ====
Cavendish returned to racing at the Vuelta a San Juan in Argentina, having not raced since August 2018. He finished eighth on the opening stage and later said it was "nice to be back in the peloton". He was not selected for the Tour de France because of strained relations with Team Dimension Data principal and owner Douglas Ryder and other health issues since 2017. In response, Cavendish said he was "absolutely heart-broken" to be missing a race in which he had competed each year since 2007. Ryder said it "was multiple people who made that decision" and that "there was a whole team involved", but this was disputed by team performance director Rolf Aldag, who said the decision was made by Ryder alone. Aldag had made his intentions clear of selecting Cavendish for the race, but later accepted it was ultimately the team owner's decision of who would be on the team. Aldag announced his departure from the team at the end of the season in a statement in early September.

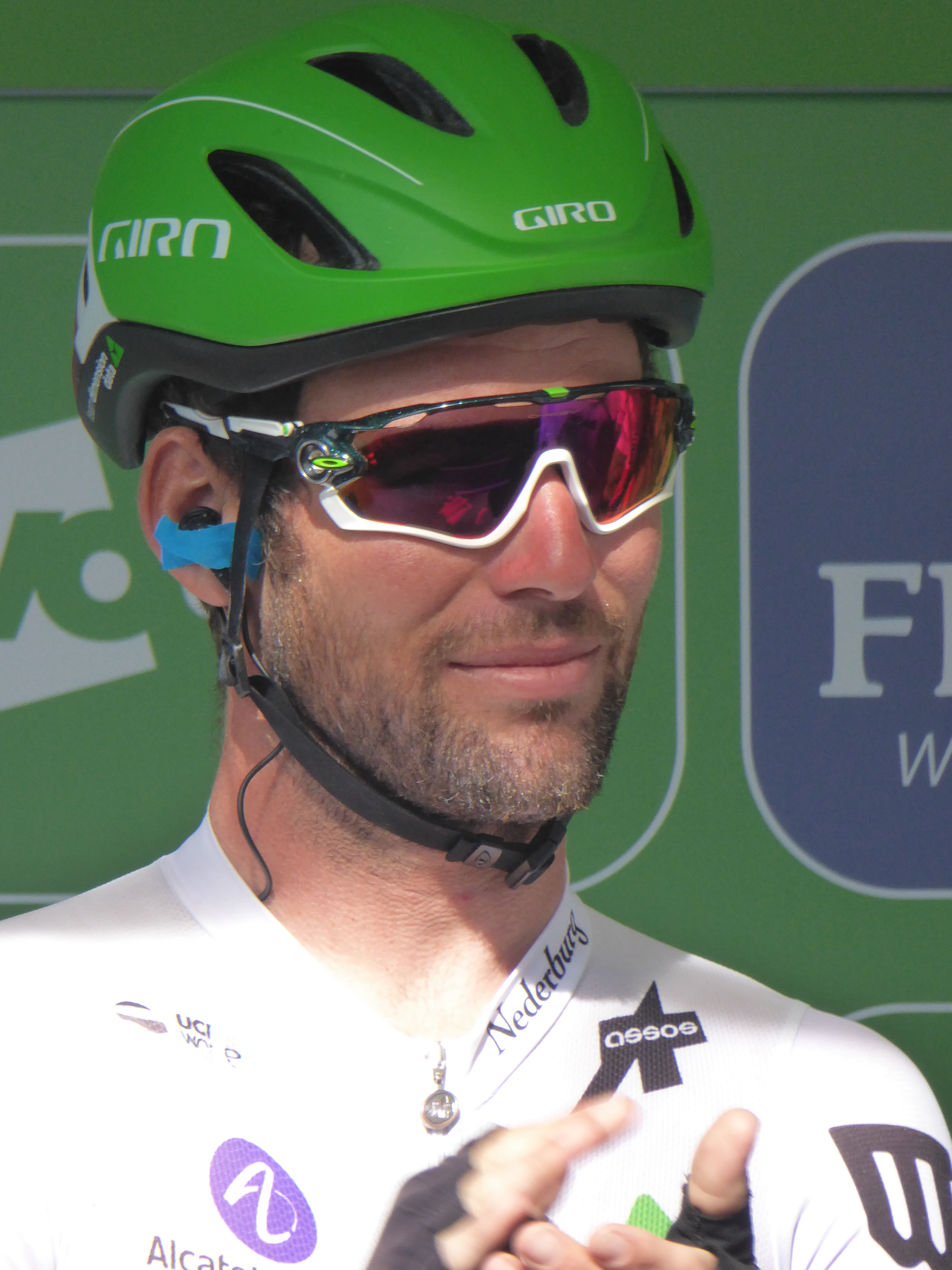
Cavendish at the 2019 Tour of Britain

Cavendish crashed on the opening stage of the Tour de Pologne after a touch of wheels around a slow and sharp corner at roughly 4 kilometres (2.5 miles) from the finish; he finished in last place. He finished sixth on stage three, then abandoned the race on stage six to focus on the European Road Championships, where he finished 31st. He was selected by Team Dimension Data to lead the team at the Deutschland Tour and to ride in the Tour of Britain. He ultimately finished the season without a win on the road, with his best result being a third-place stage finish at the Presidential Tour of Turkey in April.

=== Bahrain–McLaren (2020) ===
In late October 2019, Cavendish signed with Bahrain–McLaren for the 2020 season alongside Mikel Landa, Wout Poels, and Dylan Teuns. The announcement was followed by success in the 2019 Six Days of London where Cavendish, along with Owain Doull, finished second to Elia Viviani and Simone Consonni. At the beginning of 2020 Cavendish had his hopes of competing in the madison at the Tokyo Olympics dashed when he was not selected in the British squads for the final round of the UCI Track Cycling World Cup in Milton, Ontario, Canada, or the UCI Track Cycling World Championships in Berlin, rendering him ineligible to be selected for the Games. He made his debut for Bahrain–McLaren at the Tour of Saudi Arabia in February, where he helped teammate Phil Bauhaus to two stage wins and the overall win, after Cavendish crashed twice on the second stage of the race.

During the season he alternated between riding as a sprinter and as a lead out man for teammates, but his racing programme was disrupted by the COVID-19 pandemic. After he was not selected for the delayed Tour de France, he said he felt he was not ready for it, due to a lack of racing and the race's particularly tough mountainous route; he backed teammate Landa's bid for the yellow jersey. He rode in the delayed cobbled classics in the autumn, making a number of early breakaways. At Gent–Wevelgem he stated in an interview with Sporza that the race might be his last. He subsequently clarified that the comment related to rumours about subsequent Flemish classic races being cancelled, which turned out not to be the case: after riding in Scheldeprijs, the Tour of Flanders and the Three Days of Bruges–De Panne he declared in an interview with Het Nieuwsblad that he had had "(his) best racing month for a long time" and indicated that he wanted to continue racing "for a few more seasons".

=== Deceuninck–Quick-Step (2021–2022) ===
Following reports that he was due to retire due to difficulty in securing a World Tour contract, in December 2020, Cavendish announced his return to Deceuninck–Quick-Step for the 2021 season. His contract was for the UCI WorldTeam minimum salary of €40,000, and he had to bring his own sponsor to the team.

==== 2021 ====
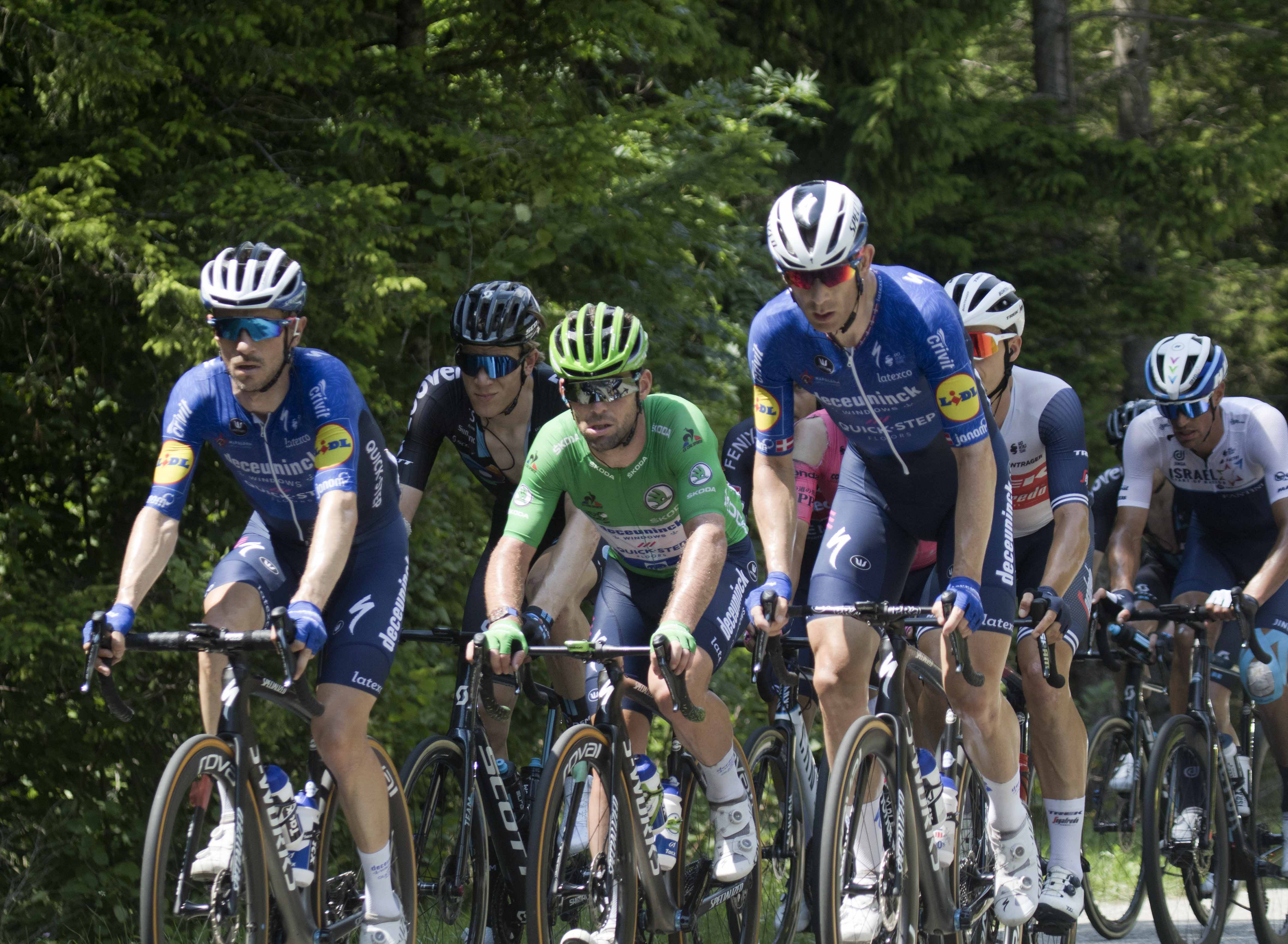
Cavendish (third from left) at the 2021 Tour de France, where he won the points classification for the second time

Having recorded his first podium finish since 2019 with a second-place finish to Tim Merlier at the Grote Prijs Jean-Pierre Monseré, Cavendish took his first four professional victories since 2018 in April, winning stages 2, 3, 4 and 8 of the Tour of Turkey. In June he took another win in the fifth and final stage of the Tour of Belgium, triumphing over a field which included such names as Caleb Ewan, Merlier, Pascal Ackermann, Dylan Groenewegen and Nacer Bouhanni. Cavendish's teammate, Sam Bennett had an increasingly strained relationship with the team's management, and when Bennett was ruled out of the Tour de France following a training injury, Cavendish was drafted in as the team's lead sprinter. He won stages four, six, ten and thirteen of the Tour, bringing his total of Tour de France stage victories to 34, making him the joint record holder for Tour stage wins along with Eddy Merckx. On the race's final stage to the Champs-Élysées, Cavendish missed out on the win, finishing third behind Wout van Aert and Jasper Philipsen. He won the points classification for the second time in his career, ten years after his first win in 2011. Cavendish was backed by the "strongest sprint train in the race" with Michael Mørkøv as his lead out man.

Cavendish's 2021 season was abruptly ended by a crash in the final Madison session of the Six Days of Ghent track event. Cavendish was closely following world Madison champion Lasse Norman Hansen, behind Gerben Thijssen and Kenny De Ketele when Thijssen slipped on a damp patch on the track sending De Ketele up the banking to sweep away Hansen's front wheel, bringing down both Hansen and Cavendish. Cavendish was taken to the intensive care unit of Ghent University Hospital suffering from broken ribs and a punctured lung. In December, Cavendish extended his contract at Deceuninck–Quick-Step for another year.

==== 2022 ====
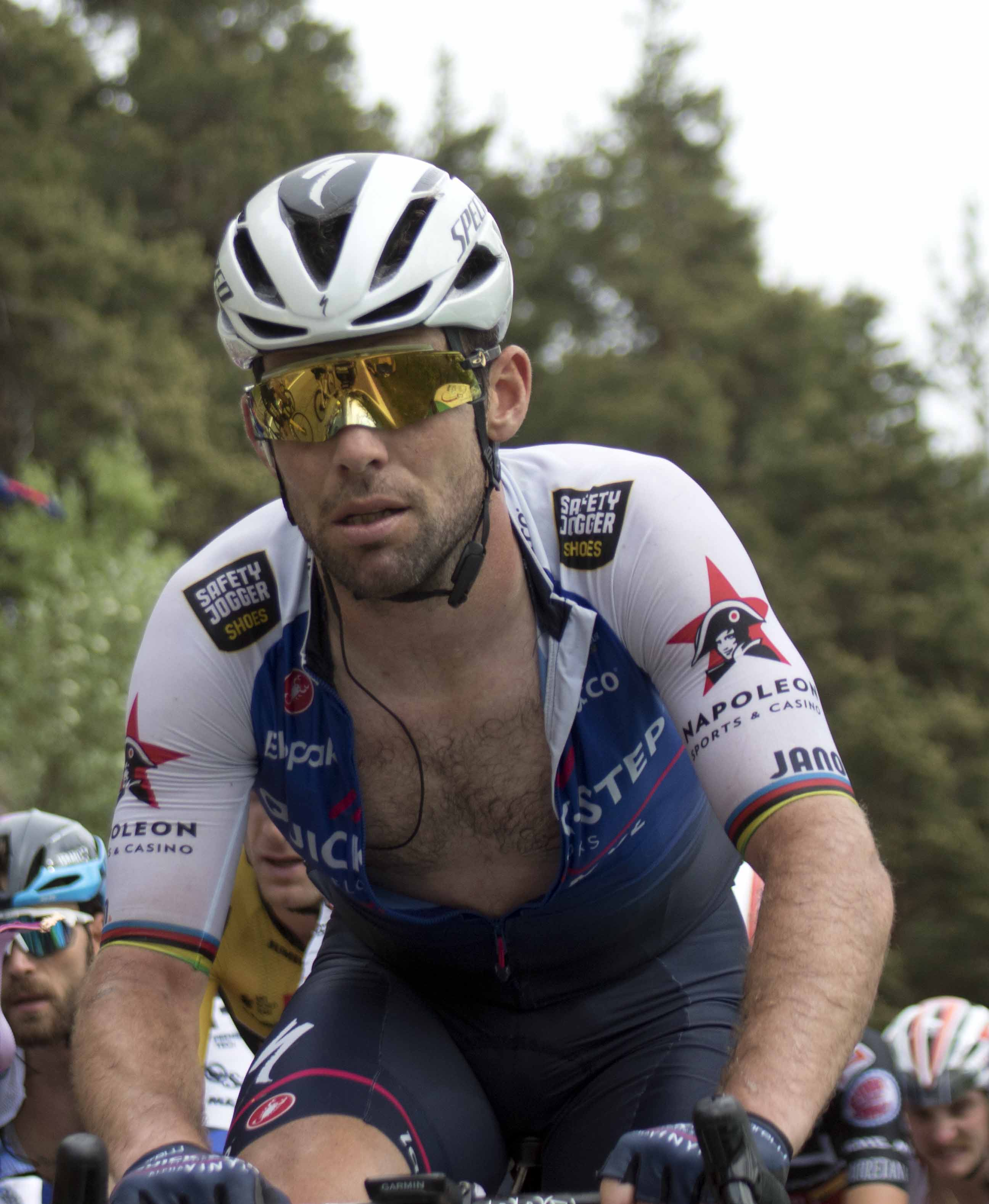
Cavendish at the 2022 Giro d'Italia

Cavendish opened his season in the Middle East with the Quick-Step Alpha Vinyl Team at the Tour of Oman. He finished second to Fernando Gaviria on the opening stage, but the following day he won the sprint for stage 2, taking the lead in both the general and points classifications. He finished the six-day event in fourth place in the points classification following a points deduction after stage 5, and being blocked by Maximiliano Richeze in the sprint for stage 6. Later in February, Cavendish won stage 2 of the UAE Tour. In March, Cavendish became the first British cyclist to win the Italian classic Milano–Torino. After racing at an average speed of 44 kilometres per hour (27 miles per hour) over a new 199-kilometre (124-mile) course from Magenta to Rivoli, Cavendish out-sprinted Nacer Bouhanni and Alexander Kristoff to take his first victory in Italy since a stage win at the 2014 Tirreno–Adriatico.

In May, Cavendish contested the Giro d'Italia for the first time since 2013, and he won the third stage of the race in Hungary, his 16th Giro stage win. This win gave him 53 career Grand Tour stage wins, bringing him within 4 of Mario Cipollini and 11 of Eddy Merckx for the most Grand Tour stage wins of all-time. He took two further podium finishes during the race, and ultimately finished third in the points classification, behind Arnaud Démare and Gaviria. The following month, Cavendish won his second British National Road Race Championships title in Castle Douglas, nine years after he won his first title in Glasgow. In July, Quick-Step Alpha Vinyl Team general manager Patrick Lefevere advised that Cavendish's contract would not be extended beyond the end of the season, and his final race with the team was a second-place finish to Tim Merlier in the Memorial Rik Van Steenbergen.

=== Astana Qazaqstan Team (2023–2024) ===
Having reportedly signed a contract with the B&B Hotels–KTM team prior to its disbanding, Cavendish started 2023 as a free agent. In mid-January, he signed a contract with the Astana Qazaqstan Team. He made his first starts with the team in the Middle East, in Oman at the Muscat Classic and the Tour of Oman, before moving onto the United Arab Emirates with a start at the UAE Tour, where he was part of a late-race break on the opening stage. During the Giro d'Italia, Cavendish announced his intention to retire at the end of the 2023 racing season. A week later, Cavendish out-sprinted his rivals to take the 21st and final stage of the Giro d'Italia in Rome, taking his tally of stage wins at the race to 17. He sought to become the record holder for stage wins at the Tour de France, but his best result was second to Jasper Philipsen on stage 7. He abandoned the race the following day, after a fall during stage 8. In October of that year, he announced he had reconsidered his decision to retire, and would stay with Astana Qazaqstan Team for the 2024 season, in the hope of breaking the Tour de France stage win record.

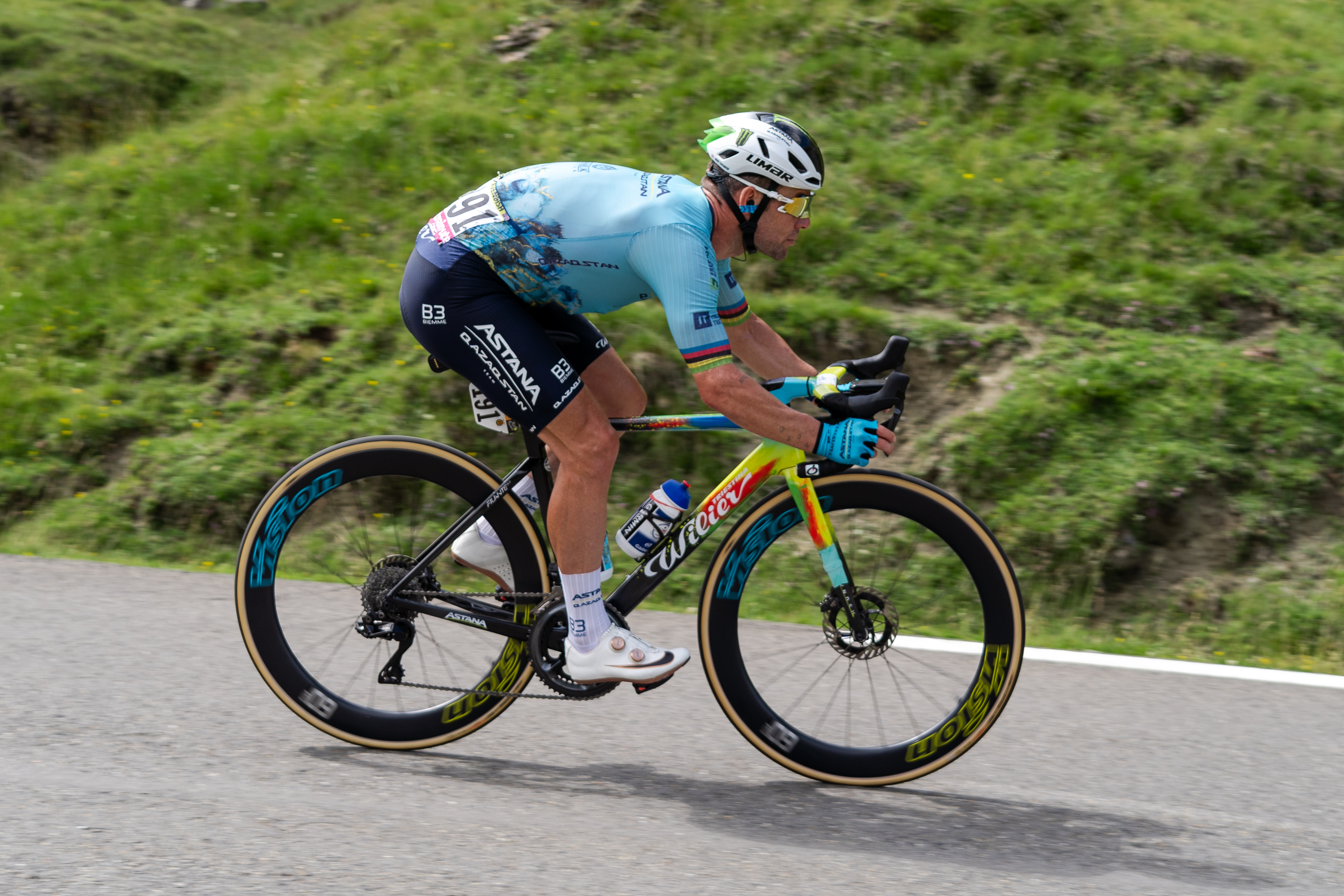
Cavendish at the 2024 Tour de France

Cavendish started the 2024 season at the Tour Colombia, where he won the fourth stage of the race, ahead of his former teammate Fernando Gaviria. He also won the second stage of the Tour de Hongrie, and featured as part of a breakaway on the final stage of the race. While racing at the Tour de Suisse, it was announced that Cavendish was to be knighted in the 2024 Birthday Honours. At the Tour de France, and having been caught behind a crash during the sprint on stage 3, Cavendish's next opportunity was on stage 5, finishing in Saint-Vulbas. Moving between the wheels in the sprint, Cavendish launched his sprint from behind Pascal Ackermann, and was able to fend off Philipsen for his record 35th Tour de France stage win. The following day, it was reported that Cavendish had received a warning from race officials for deviating from his sprinting line during the sprint. It was his only stage win during the race; he would later be penalised and fined for drafting during stage 6, relegated on stage 12 for deviating during the final sprint, and ultimately ended the race as the lanterne rouge, finishing last in the general classification. Having received his knighthood at Windsor Castle from William, Prince of Wales in October, Cavendish won the Tour de France Singapore Criterium in his final cycling start, retiring with 165 professional victories. He was not nominated for the BBC Sports Personality of the Year Award, but instead received the BBC Sports Personality of the Year Lifetime Achievement Award.

== Riding style and incidents ==
Cavendish has an aggressive riding style that has been compared to a sprinter pushing on the starting blocks. At the 2009 Tour de France, the points he gained in the intermediate sprint in stage fourteen were removed after he was judged to have driven Thor Hushovd too close to barriers on the course. After stage nineteen, he said he was "embarrassed" for his comments about "deserving" green jersey wearer Hushovd. After stage four of the 2010 Tour de Suisse, Cavendish was found to be at fault for a crash involving himself and Heinrich Haussler during the end of the sprint stage. The crash caused Haussler, Arnaud Coyot and Lloyd Mondory to quit the race because of their injuries, though Cavendish was able to continue. Cavendish received a thirty-second penalty and a CHF200 fine. The start of the next stage was disrupted by fellow riders protesting Cavendish's riding and style, and what they said was a lack of respect from him.

His riding style resulted in organisers of the 2013 Boxmeer Criterium in the Netherlands to announce he was not welcome due to an incident during stage ten of the 2013 Tour de France, when he bumped Dutch rider Tom Veelers in a sprint finish, sending the Argos-Shimano rider tumbling. Another instance of dubious safety concerns while riding was witnessed on the opening stage of the 2014 Tour de France as Cavendish caused Simon Gerrans to crash while trying to push him out of the way during the sprint. In 2016, Cavendish accepted responsibility and apologised for the crash of South Korean cyclist Park Sang-hoon at the men's omnium event at the Olympics when an incident between them led to Park being thrown from his bike. After the crash, Park appeared unconscious and did not move while paramedics administered first aid; he was eventually taken away on a stretcher.

Cavendish has been described as confident, even arrogant. In 2008 he said: "When journalists at the Tour de France ask me if I am the best sprinter, I answer 'Yes', and that's seen as arrogance, but if they don't ask me, I don't say I'm the best sprinter in the world." He has an eidetic memory for the details of race routes. In a 2013 interview with Jonathan Liew, he said: "If I do a circuit then after three laps I could tell you where all the potholes were." As a test, Liew asked him to recount the close of his win in San Remo five years earlier. It took him five minutes to recite every detail of the last 10 kilometres (6.2 miles). This is an obvious asset to Cavendish in planning and timing his races.

== Personal life ==
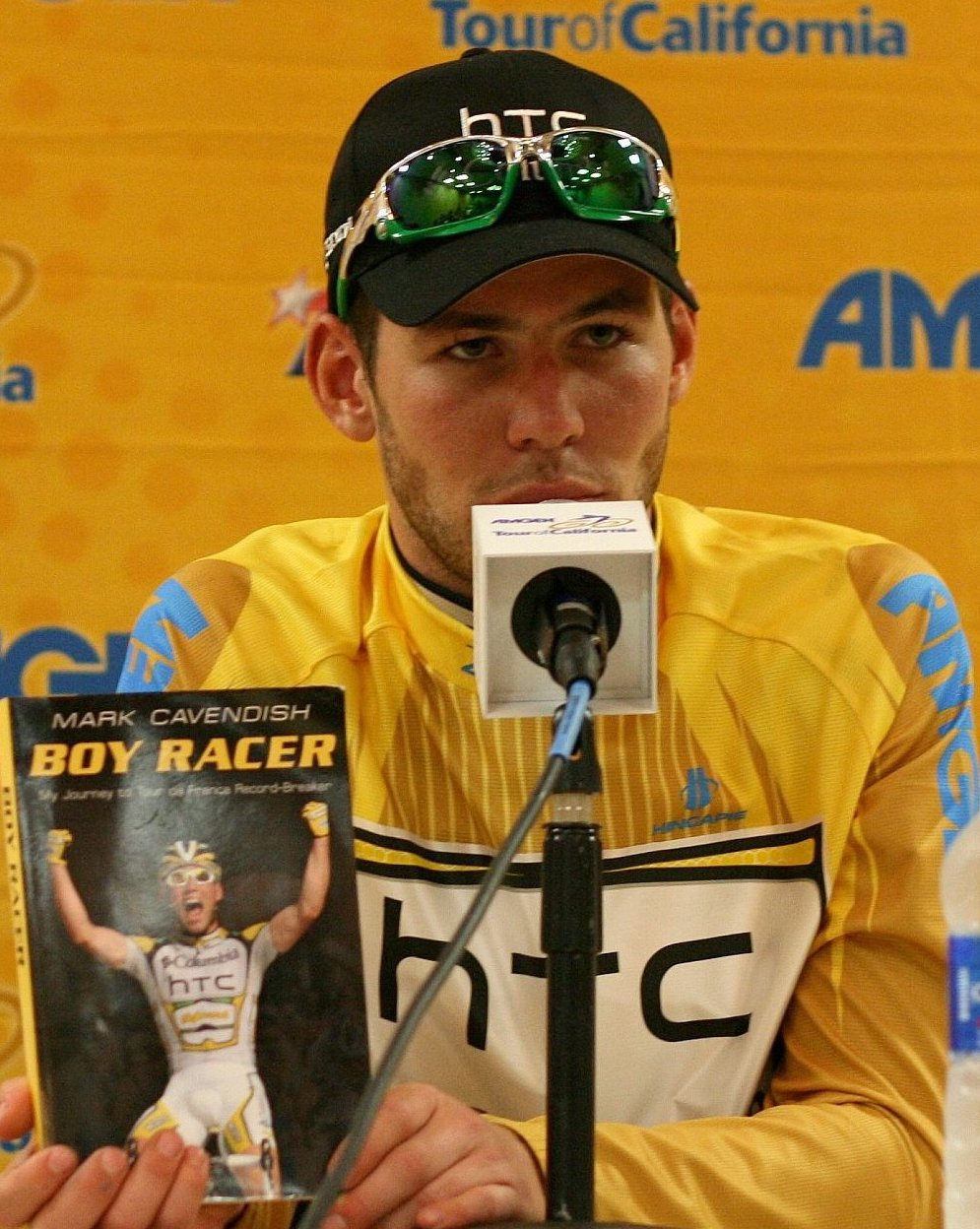
Cavendish during a press conference at the 2010 Tour of California, with his autobiography Boy Racer.

On 5 October 2013, Cavendish married model Peta Todd in London, making him stepfather to her son from a previous relationship. Cavendish and Todd have four children together. He has three homes: one on the Isle of Man, which he said will always be his real home; one in Ongar, Essex; and a training base in Quarrata, Tuscany, Italy. The Cavendish family were robbed at knifepoint in their home in Essex in November 2021, and two men were jailed at Chelmsford Crown Court in February 2023 for their involvement in the robbery.

In January 2015 Cavendish announced the creation of the Rise Above Sportive, a cyclosportive to be held in Chester and North Wales in August 2015. In November 2015, he was awarded an honorary doctorate in science by the University of Chester for his contribution to cycling. He was diagnosed with Epstein–Barr virus in April 2017 and spent months out of action before returning to race the 2017 Tour de France. In August 2018 he was diagnosed with the virus a second time and withdrew from training and racing to recuperate.

=== Memoirs ===
In June 2009, his autobiography Boy Racer, which covered his career up to that year, was published by Ebury Press. At a press conference in London ahead of the 2009 Tour de France, Cavendish explained the book was "more a biography of last year's Tour stage wins" than an autobiography. His "biggest motivation for writing it had been to explain himself better", to counter the way he came across during interviews immediately after races. In an interview with Cyclingnews.com, Cavendish said the book would "cause some controversy" before stating it is positive in respect to others. The book addresses many events including an offer of more money from elsewhere to leave Team Columbia–High Road in 2008, which Cavendish declined; relationships with teams and riders; and significant moments for him of some races. Each chapter describes a stage from the 2008 Tour de France stages one to fourteen, using other autobiographical moments from Cavendish's life. In November 2013 his second book At Speed was also published by Ebury. Following on from Boy Racer it covered the part of his career from 2010 to 2013. In November 2021, Ebury Press published Tour de Force: My history-making Tour de France, which detailed Cavendish's return to success at the 2021 Tour.

=== Commemorative stamps ===
In December 2024, the Isle of Man Post Office published a collection of stamps honouring Cavendish. The collection, released as a sheetlet, was an amalgamation of three previous stamp issues featuring the cyclist, showcasing images capturing key moments throughout the years. They included representing the Isle of Man at the Commonwealth Games, being part of Great Britain's Olympic team, and competing in the Tour de France. The collection also featured details about his career and famous victories.

== See also ==
- Mark Cavendish: Never Enough
- Chasing Legends
- List of British cyclists
- List of British cyclists who have led the Tour de France general classification
- List of Giro d'Italia classification winners
- List of Manx people
- List of Tour de France secondary classification winners
- List of Vuelta a España classification winners
