= Cycling at the 2006 Commonwealth Games – Men's scratch race =

The men's scratch at the 2006 Commonwealth Games took place on March 19, 2006 at the Vodafone Arena.

== Qualification ==
=== Heat 1 ===
Rank	Rider	Time
1	Greg Henderson (NZL)	12:21.200
2	Zachary Bell (CAN)	
3	Ashley Hutchinson (AUS)	
4	Ross Sander (WAL)	
5	Rob Hayles (ENG)	
6	Sean Finning (AUS)	
7	Jonathan Matthew Bellis (IOM)	
8	Mark Richard Kelly (IOM)	
9	James McCallum (SCO)	
10	Garth Conrad Thomas (RSA)	
11	Muhammad Fauzan Ahmad Lufti (MAS)	
12	Weng Kim Thum (MAS)	
13	Durwan Benjamin (RSA)	
	Jason Perryman (BAR)	DNS
	Warren Christopher McKay (GUY)	DNS
	Stephen Gallagher (NIR)	DNF

=== Heat 2 ===
Rank	Rider	Time
1	Timothy Gudsell (NZL)	11:44.350
2	Hayden Godfrey (NZL)	
3	Martin Gilbert (CAN)	
4	Mohd Sayuti Mohd Zahit (MAS)	
5	Edward Clancy (ENG)	
6	Geraint Thomas (WAL)	
7	Mark Cavendish (IOM)	
8	Ben Kersten (AUS)	
9	Rupert Rheeder (RSA)	
10	Matthew Brammeier (WAL)	
11	Horace McFarlane (JAM)	
12	Evan Oliphant (SCO)	
13	Ian Stannard (ENG)	
	Thomas Evans (NIR)	DNF
	Emile Abraham (TRI)	DNF

== Final ==
Rank	Rider	Time
1st place, gold medalist(s)	Mark Cavendish (IOM)	23:05.540
2nd place, silver medalist(s)	Ashley Hutchinson (AUS)	
3rd place, bronze medalist(s)	James McCallum (SCO)	
4	Timothy Gudsell (NZL)	
5	Zachary Bell (CAN)	
6	Jonathan Matthew Bellis (IOM)	
7	Evan Oliphant (SCO)	
8	Mark Richard Kelly (IOM)	
9	Martin Gilbert (CAN)	
10	Greg Henderson (NZL)	
11	Garth Conrad Thomas (RSA)	
12	Mohd Sayuti Mohd Zahit (MAS)	
13	Ben Kersten (AUS)	
14	Weng Kim Thum (MAS)	
15	Muhammad Fauzan Ahmad Lufti (MAS)	
	Horace McFarlane (JAM)	DNS
	Matthew Brammeier (WAL)	DNS
	Geraint Thomas (WAL)	DNS
	Sean Finning (AUS)	DNS
	Edward Clancy (ENG)	DNS
	Hayden Godfrey (NZL)	DNS
	Rupert Rheeder (RSA)	DNS
	Ross Sander (WAL)	DNS
	Rob Hayles (ENG)	DQ
