= Chasing Legends =

2010 cycling film by Jason Berry

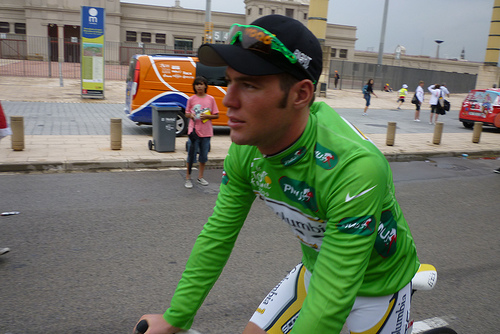
- Mark Cavendish of Team Columbia–HTC during the 2009 Tour de France
- Directed by: Jason Berry
- Produced by: Ken Bell
- Production company: Gripped Films
- Release date: May 2010 (United States)
- Country: United States
- Language: English

Chasing Legends is a documentary film covering the events of the 2009 Tour de France from the perspective of Team Columbia–HTC. It premiered at the cinema in May 2010 in the US and October 2010 in the UK.

Among the cyclists featured in the film are Mark Cavendish, George Hincapie and Erik Zabel. Former cycling legend Eddy Merckx also makes an appearance.
