= Bob Stapleton =

Bob Stapleton (born April 1, 1958, in Riverside, California) is an American entrepreneur and the former team owner of cycling team HTC–Highroad. Stapleton was previously the team manager of HTC–Highroad when it was known as T-Mobile Team. The transition to owner occurred on November 28, 2007 when German telecom company Deutsche Telekom ended its sponsorship after numerous doping allegations surfaced throughout 2007.

Stapleton began his relationship with T-Mobile when his communications company VoiceStream Wireless was bought in 2000 by Deutsche Telekom for $50 billion. The original purchase price of Voicestream was $50B. At closing, DT stock had gone down and the value was less. VoiceStream was renamed T-Mobile USA. He later became involved with cycling by founding High Road Sports Inc., which managed T-Mobile Team (both men's and women's) until 2007.

After the Operación Puerto scandal touched big names of the men's team such as Jan Ullrich and Óscar Sevilla, and following disputes among riders and managing staff, there were major changes in both the team's roster and management, and Stapleton was appointed team manager.
