= HTC–Highroad =

Professional road bicycling team (2008–2011)

Team information
- UCI code: THR
- Registered: USA
- Founded: 1989
- Disbanded: 2011
- Discipline: Road
- Status: UCI ProTeam
- Bicycles: Specialized

Key personnel
- General manager: Bob Stapleton

Team name history
- 1989 1990 1991–2003 2004–2007 2007–2008 2008 2009 2010 2011: Stuttgart-Merckx-Gonsor; Stuttgart-Mercedes-Merckx-Puma; Team Telekom; T-Mobile Team; Team High Road; Team Columbia; Team Columbia–High Road; Team Columbia–HTC; Team HTC–Columbia; HTC–Highroad
HTC–Highroad jersey
Jersey

HTC–Highroad (UCI team code: THR) was a former professional cycling team competing in international road bicycle races. Their last title sponsor was HTC Corporation, a Taiwanese manufacturer of smartphones but dissolved at the end of the 2011 season from a failure to find a new sponsor. High Road Sports was the management company of team manager Bob Stapleton. Past title sponsors include Columbia Sportswear and Deutsche Telekom.

The team was founded in 1991 as Team Telekom, sponsored by Deutsche Telekom. In 2004 their name changed to the T-Mobile Team. The team was under the management of Bob Stapleton and Rolf Aldag. Former leaders included Olaf Ludwig, Walter Godefroot and Eddy Vandenhecke (managers), Luuc Eisenga (spokesperson) and Brian Holm, Valerio Piva (sports directors).

== History ==
=== Team beginnings: 1988–1991 ===
At the end of 1988, former World Champion Hennie Kuiper set up a German cycling team that was sponsored by the city of Stuttgart and rode on Eddy Merckx Cycles. The team was called Stuttgart-Merckx-Gonsor for the 1989 season and had nine riders (which included Udo Bölts). At that time when there were no German cycling teams and the country's main cycling event, the Rund um den Henninger Turm had not been won by a German since Rudi Altig in 1970. During its first year of existence team rider Dariusc Kajzer brought the team its first success in the National Road Race Championships in Germany. The team became Stuttgart-Mercedes-Merckx-Puma in 1990 and Bölts continued the success of the team by becoming road race champion of Germany.

=== Team Telekom: 1991–2004 ===
Deutsche Telekom came in as the main sponsor in 1991 and the team was known as Telekom-Mercedes-Merckx-Puma. According to an interview with Godefroot, it was Bölts’ 17th place at the 1991 Vuelta a España that prompted him to accept the Telekom management's offer to take over the running of the team. Godefroot signed several riders including Classics specialist and 1991 Paris–Roubaix winner Marc Madiot. Bölts who was involved with the team since its beginnings in 1989 would stay with the team until 2003, continued building on the successes of the team by winning stage 19, the Queen stage of the 1992 Giro d'Italia. Jens Heppner continued this streak with his overall tenth place at the 1992 Tour de France.

The Telekom team signed all the promising cyclists that were coming from Germany at that time and who were becoming successful. These included Jens Heppner and Christian Henn in 1992, Erik Zabel, Rolf Aldag and Steffen Wesemann in 1993 and Jan Ullrich in 1994. Many of these riders would ride for more than ten years with the team. Olaf Ludwig also signed in 1993 and finished his career with the team. In 1994, Zabel won the first UCI Road World Cup victory in the history of the team, the Paris–Tours.

In 1993, the team again achieved success in the national championship road race in Germany. This was the start of the team's 11 year domination and possession of the German champion's jersey. Many of the successful team riders that spent many years of their career with Telekom would become German national champions – Bernd Gröne in 1993, Jens Heppner in 1994, Bölts in 1990, 1995 and 1999, Christian Henn in 1996, Jan Ullrich in 1997 and 2001, Erik Zabel in 1998 and 2003, Rolf Aldag in 2000, Danilo Hondo in 2002 and finally Andreas Klöden in 2004.

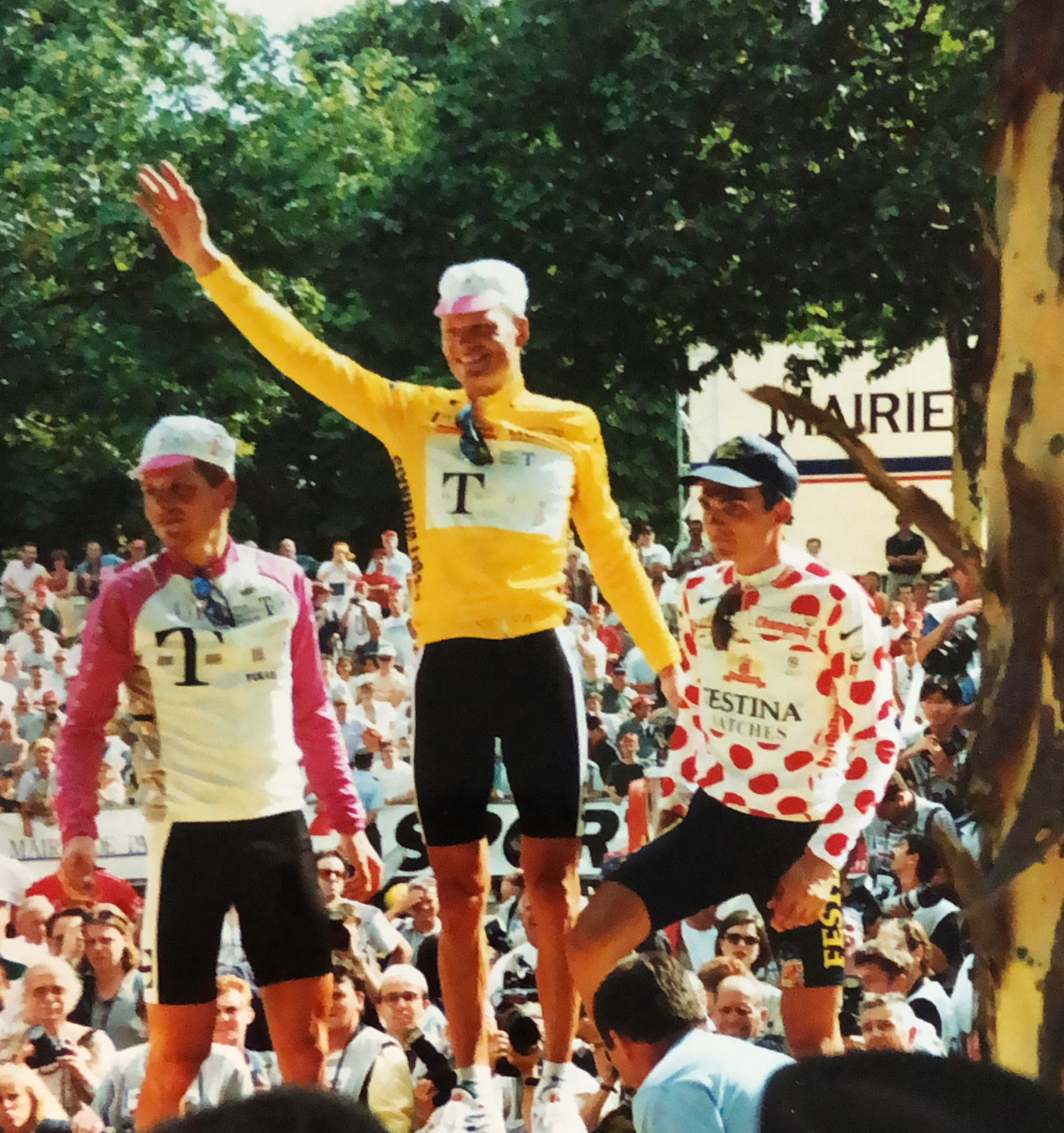
Bjarne Riis (centre) and Jan Ullrich (left) on the podium at the 1996 Tour de France

The team soon became an important presence on the international cycling stage. However the team was not invited to the 1995 Tour de France. Eventually the organisers of the Tour agreed that six Telekom members, namely Rolf Aldag, Udo Bölts, Jens Heppner, Vladimir Pulnikov, Erik Zabel and Olaf Ludwig would join with three members of the ZG Mobili to form a composite team. Zabel went on to win two stages in the race.

The next two years saw the international breakthrough of the team. Godefroot brought in the Danish rider, Bjarne Riis, the third-place finisher of the 1995 Tour and he went on to win the 1996 Tour de France, with the then 22-year-old German support rider Jan Ullrich finishing in second place. In addition, Zabel won the first of six green jerseys for winning the points competition. Bolts won the Clásica de San Sebastián and Wesemann won his second and the first of four wins with the Telekom team of the Peace Race.

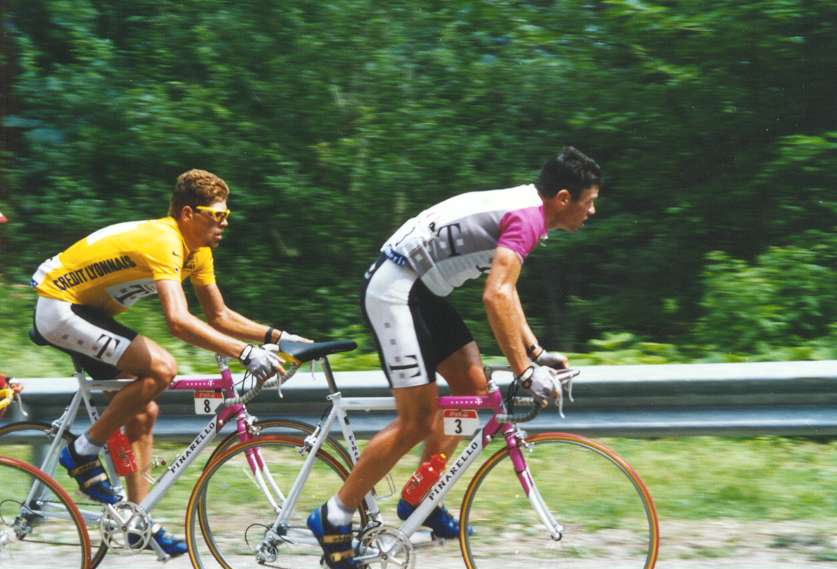
1997 Tour: Jan Ullrich in the leader's jersey, with Udo Bölts riding in support.

The 1997 Tour de France saw the emergence of Ullrich as he won the race with support from Riis, who in turn had won the World Cup race, Amstel Gold Race earlier in 1997. Team Telekom also won the team classification, as the overall strongest team of the 1997 Tour. In addition, Bolts won the Critérium du Dauphiné Libéré, Zabel won Milan–San Remo for the first of four times with the team. Ullrich also won the Championships of Hamburg semi-classic. The following year this race was elevated to the status of World Cup. In addition the Deutschland Tour returned in 1999 – evidence of the continuing popularity of cycling in Germany at the time. While Ullrich had a crash in the race and was forced to retire, Team Telekom did win the first edition of the race with Heppner and would win the race again with Alexander Vinokourov in 2001.

Ullrich finished second in the 1998 Tour de France but went on to win the 1999 Vuelta a España, although he missed the 1999 Tour de France due to a knee injury. After winning the Vuelta, Ullrich became World time trial champion which enabled him to wear the rainbow jersey during time trials. He would win this again in 2001. The next year, Zabel won the overall World Cup victory, having won the Milan–San Remo and Amstel Gold Race, while Ullrich was placed second again in the 2000 Tour de France to Lance Armstrong. Ullrich won the gold medal in the Olympic road race and the silver medal in the Olympic time trial. In 2001, Zabel won Milan–San Remo for the fourth time. Ullrich came in second in the 2001 Tour de France, while Zabel won six stages combined in the 2001 Tour and Vuelta. Kazakh rider Alexander Vinokourov won the Paris–Nice stage race in 2002, a feat he would duplicate in 2003, also winning the Amstel Gold Race and Tour de Suisse that year. As Ullrich left the team to form Team Bianchi in 2003, Vinokourov became team leader for the 2003 Tour de France. He finished in third place, just below the second placed Ullrich. Zabel won the 2003 Paris–Tours, while Italian rider Daniele Nardello took the Züri-Metzgete.

The team had a continuous presence at the top of the professional peloton and continued to sign the emerging German cyclists of the times including Andreas Klöden in 1998, Jörg Jaksche in 1999, Matthias Kessler in 2000 and Stefan Schumacher in 2002. In addition, the team also signed many successful non-German riders such as Georg Totschnig, Alexander Vinokourov, Cadel Evans, Santiago Botero and Paolo Savoldelli.

In 2005 a film titled Hell on Wheels was released. It is a record of the 100th anniversary (but only the 90th running because of World War I and World War II) of the 2003 Tour de France in from the perspective of the then-Team Telekom.

=== T-Mobile: 2004 – November 2007 ===
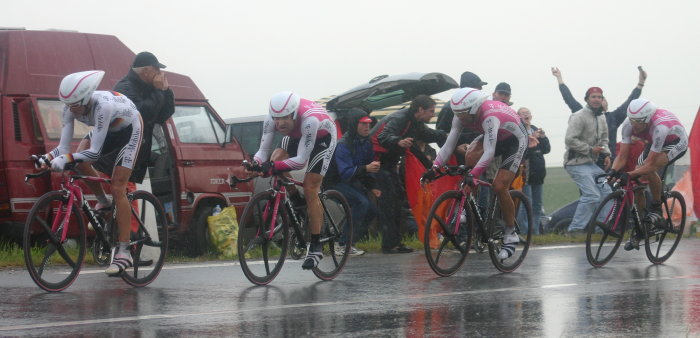
T-Mobile-Team, 2004 Tour de France

From 2004, the team changed its name to T-Mobile. Jan Ullrich returned to the team. The team achieved a great number of success, among which was Steffen Wesemann's win in the Tour of Flanders. Coming up to the 2004 Tour de France, Kloden became German road race champion and Ullrich won the Tour de Suisse and raced the 2004 Tour de France as team leader, while Vinokourov did not ride the Tour de France for the team. Jan Ullrich finished fourth, while Andreas Klöden was the best placed rider of the team in second place. T-Mobile Team won the team classification, as the overall strongest team of the 2004 Tour. In the spring season of 2005, Vinokourov won the Liège–Bastogne–Liège classic race. Ullrich, as the team leader, finished 3rd overall in the 2005 Tour de France. Alexander Vinokourov rode in support, and finished fifth as he won two stages, including the final stage on the Champs-Élysées. Italian rider Giuseppe Guerini also won a stage and T-Mobile Team matched their 2004 feat by once again winning the team classification in 2005. Zabel won the Paris–Tours for the third time at the end of the season.

In July 2005, during the 2005 Tour, Vinokourov's contract was running out and speculation was abundant if he was to stay with T-Mobile. With four days left of the 2005 Tour, he made an announcement that he would leave the team to pursue his own chances of winning the Tour de France as a team captain and after the Tour he joined the Liberty Seguros team. After 13 years with Team Telekom and T-Mobile Team, Erik Zabel also left in 2005 to ride for the newly formed Team Milram. Before the 2006 season, Walter Godefroot stepped down and Olaf Ludwig became the new T-Mobile team manager.

=== Doping scandals: 2006–2007 ===
In the most controversial scandal since the 1998 tour, thirteen riders were expelled from the 2006 Tour de France stemming from a Spanish doping scandal, on the eve of Strasbourg prologue to the 93rd edition. Jan Ullrich, one of the favorites to win the race, was among those excluded from the Tour. Another T-Mobile rider, Óscar Sevilla, was also expelled, leaving the team starting with only seven riders.

On July 9, the team announced the dismissal of its sporting director, Rudy Pevenage, for his implication with former Tour de France winner Jan Ullrich in a Spanish blood doping scandal. "The contract linking T-Mobile to Pevenage has been retrospectively stopped on June 30", the team's general manager, Olaf Ludwig, said.

On July 21, 2006, T-Mobile fired Jan Ullrich from the team pending the doping investigation.

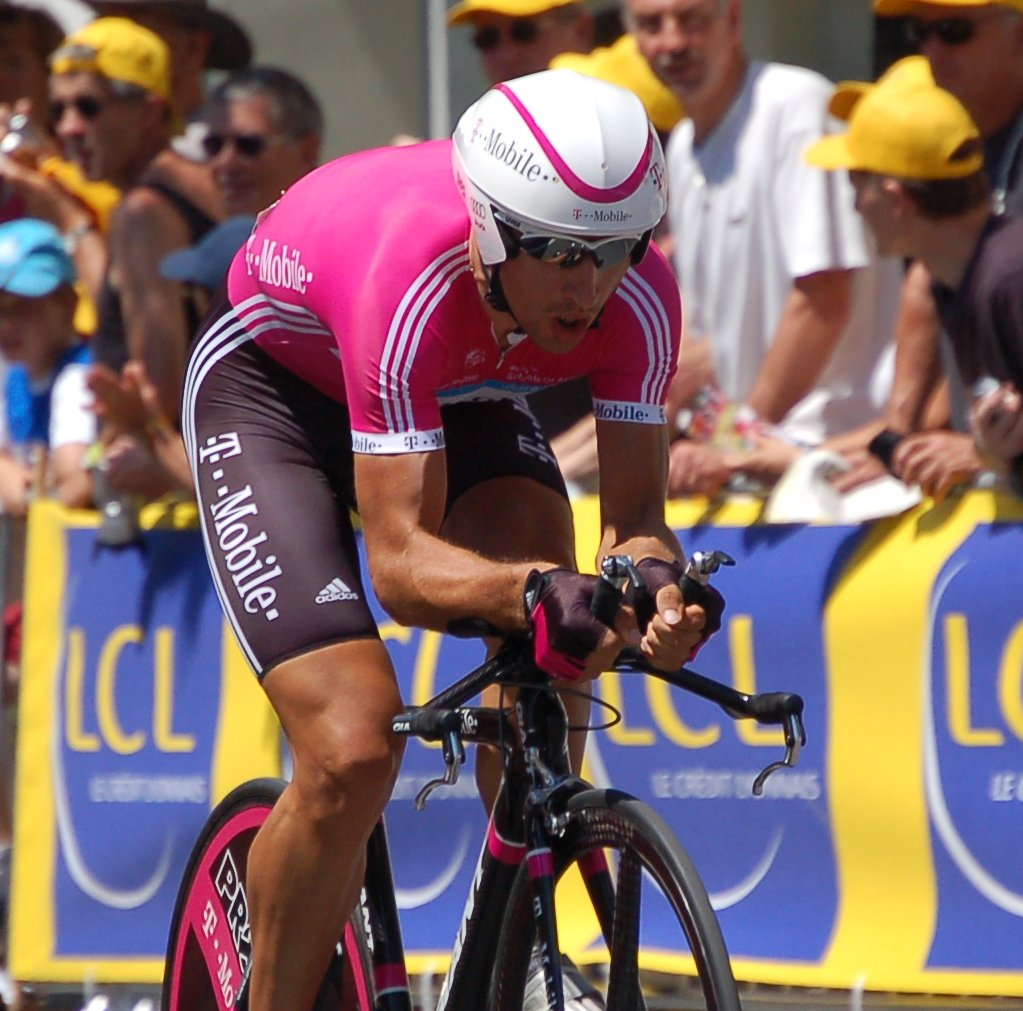
Serhiy Honchar riding the Prologue at the 2006 Tour de France

At the 2006 Tour de France, T-Mobile won the team classification for the third consecutive year, Andreas Klöden reached the podium (3rd place) for the second time, Matthias Kessler won Stage 3, Serhiy Honchar won two individual time trials (Stages 7 and 19) and wore the yellow jersey for 3 days (after Stages 7–9).

After the Tour de France, the team changed significantly; team manager, Olaf Ludwig left the team and was replaced by Bob Stapleton. Rolf Aldag, Allan Peiper and Tristan Hoffman became directeur sportifs. As already discussed Ullrich, Sevilla and Pevenage were dismissed from the team. Several riders who had been with the team for a long time such as Steffen Wesemann, Andreas Klöden and Matthias Kessler left. However, the reason is unclear. Jörg Ludewig was put on suspension and his contract was not increased in connection with intention to dope previously in his career and before he joined T-Mobile. Eddy Mazzoleni who was in his first year for the team also left. The contracts of Bram Schmitz and Bas Giling were not renewed. Dr. Lothar Heinrich, the team doctor since 1995, and Dr. Andreas Schmid set up a new comprehensive testing system. Following the revelations that came out of the Operación Puerto investigation, Heinrich allegedly nearly quit the sport but instead he joined with Stapleton and other team staff to create a new system of internal controls and health checks that he insisted would demonstrate that T-Mobile riders were clean and to restore credibility to the sport.

In May 2007, several former riders admitted to using banned substances (including EPO) while riding for the team in the mid-1990s, including Erik Zabel, Rolf Aldag, Brian Holm, Bjarne Riis, Bert Dietz, Udo Bölts and Christian Henn including the seasons in which Riis and Ullrich won the Tour de France. Team doctors Andreas Schmid and Lothar Heinrich also confessed to participating and administering banned substances. The latter was Team Telekom's sporting director until May 3, 2007, when he was suspended following allegations published in former team member Jef d'Hont's book. Jef d'Hont had worked as a massage therapist for Team Telekom in 1992–96, and revealed in his book how the doping system had been organized at the team, throughout those years.

In an effort to present a renewed image the team brought a young team to the 2007 Tour de France, and promoted a drug-free attitude and image. Despite this, team member Patrik Sinkewitz tested positive for elevated testosterone during a training camp. The test results were only announced when Sinkewitz had dropped out of the Tour because of injury. He was still in hospital when he was suspended from Team T-Mobile, and was dismissed on July 31, 2007.

=== Team High Road: November 2007 – June 2008 ===
In November 2007, Deutsche Telekom AG announced that it was to end sponsorship of professional cycling with immediate effect. The team continued under the name "Team High Road" through June 2008. The team changed nationality in February 2008, switching from Germany to the United States. The team continued due to the funding from the team owner, Bob Stapleton, as the team did not have enough time to gather sponsors for the new year. The team had a successful start to the year with Luxembourg rider, Kim Kirchen winning the classic La Flèche Wallonne. Results like this and also High-Road's performance at the Giro d'Italia helped the team secure a sponsor for the end of the year.

=== Team Columbia and Team Columbia–High Road: July 2008 – June 2009 ===
On June 15, 2008 Columbia Sportswear announced a three-year sponsorship of the team beginning on July 5, the start of the Tour de France, changing the name to "Team Columbia". The sponsorship included both the men's and women's teams. The team went on to have a highly successful Tour, winning 5 stages (four of which went to British sprinter Mark Cavendish) and team leader Kim Kirchen lead the overall classification for four days and the points competition for three.

=== Team Columbia–HTC: June 2009 – January 2010 and Team HTC–Columbia: January 2010 – 2011 ===
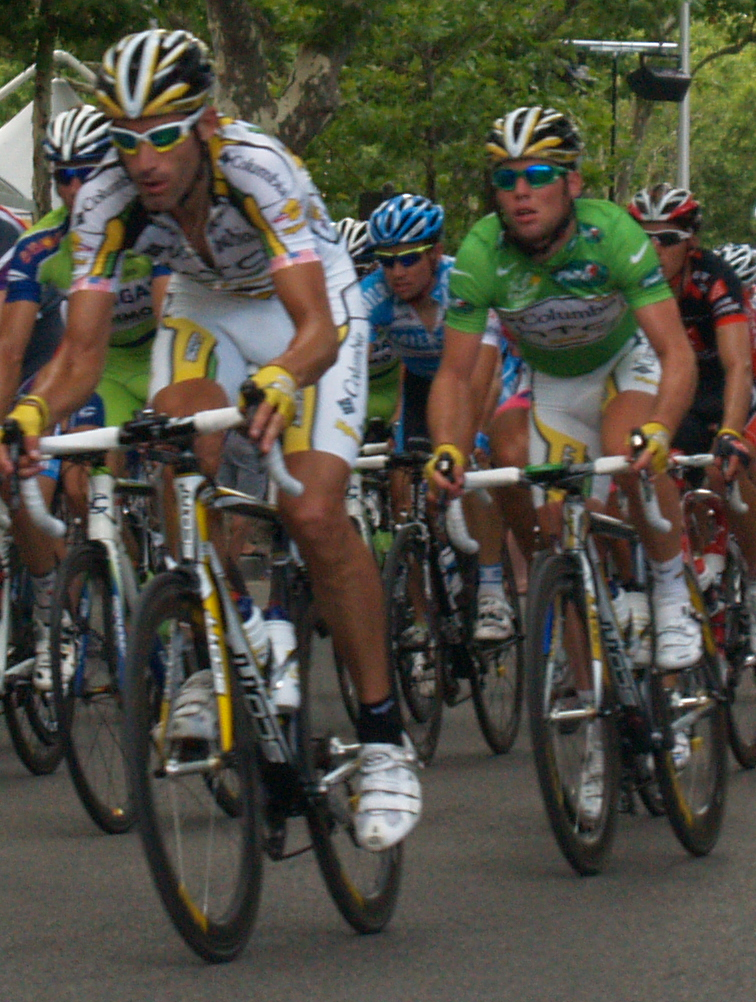
George Hincapie and Mark Cavendish in the green jersey during Stage 3 of the 2009 Tour de France

On June 29, 2009 HTC announced a three-year sponsorship of the team beginning with the 2009 Tour de France. The team's new name was "Team Columbia–HTC." Like the Columbia Sportswear sponsorship, the HTC sponsorship included both the men's and women's teams. The team enjoyed great success at the 2009 Tour de France with Mark Cavendish winning 6 stages over the course of the 3 weeks. The most memorable of these was his victory on the Champs-Élysées in Paris where he won by a huge margin; almost 30m, with his own lead out man, Mark Renshaw having enough time to come in 2nd with his arms raised. A documentary film called Chasing Legends was later released that covered the 2009 tour through the eyes of HTC–Columbia.

August proved a very good month for Norwegian all-rounder Edvald Boasson Hagen, with two stage wins and a podium finish in the Tour of Poland and two more stage wins and the GC win in the Eneco Tour. After stage wins in the other two Grand Tours of 2009, it took the team only three days to win yet another in the Vuelta, where Gregory Henderson took home the flowers.

Despite its many successes, Team Columbia did not seem to be able to afford as many top riders as they had, and due to their many victories, a lot of riders were targeted by other teams for the 2010 season. Notable riders such as Kim Kirchen, Edvald Boasson Hagen, Michael Barry, George Hincapie and Thomas Lövkvist elected to leave the team. As replacements, a lot of young talented riders, such as Jan Ghyselinck, Rasmus Guldhammer and Martin and Peter Velits were contracted.

On October 17, 2010, Team Columbia HTC announced a tie up with Specialized for 2011. Specialized would supply the team's frames, forks, and helmets. The men would race the S-Works Tarmac for most road races, the S-Works Roubaix for cobbled classics, and the Shiv TT in time trials. The all-new S-Works Prevail and TT3 helmets would protect the riders in road and TT applications, respectively.

On August 4, 2011, General Manager, Bob Stapleton announced that Team HTC–Highroad were to fold at the end of the 2011 season after failing to find a new sponsor.

The team's final event was the Chrono des Nations, in October 2011. The men's and women's teams both finished with victories, Tony Martin winning the men's 48 km time trial, while Amber Neben won the women's 20 km event. This gave the team 121 victories in its final year.

HTC–Highroad was voted 2011 Team of the Year by Cyclingnews.com, and won the Best Team and Best Women's Team awards at the Velonews awards for 2011.

== National, continental, world and Olympic champions ==
1989
German Road Race, Dariusz Kajzer
1990
German Road Race, Udo Bölts
1994
German Road Race, Jens Heppner
1995
German Road Race, Udo Bölts
German Time Trial, Jan Ullrich
1996
Danish Road Race, Bjarne Riis
Danish Time Trial, Bjarne Riis
1997
Austrian Road Race, Georg Totschnig
Austrian Time Trial, Georg Totschnig
German Road Race, Jan Ullrich
1998
German Road Race, Erik Zabel
1999
UCI World Champion Time Trial, Jan Ullrich
German Road Race, Udo Bölts
2000
German Road Race, Rolf Aldag
2001
German Road Race, Jan Ullrich
UCI World Champion Time Trial, Jan Ullrich
Kazakhstan Road Race, Andrey Mizurov
2002
German Road Race, Danilo Hondo
2003
German Road Race, Erik Zabel
2004
German Road Race, Andreas Klöden
2005
Kazakhstan Road Race, Alexander Vinokourov
Russian Road Race, Sergei Ivanov
2006
Austrian Road Race, Bernhard Kohl
2007
German Time Trial, Bert Grabsch
Italian Time Trial, Marco Pinotti
2008
Australian Time Trial, Adam Hansen
Norwegian Time Trial, Edvald Boasson Hagen
Luxembourg Time Trial, Kim Kirchen
Italian Time Trial, Marco Pinotti
Czech Time Trial, František Raboň
German Time Trial, Bert Grabsch
UCI World Champion Time Trial, Bert Grabsch
2009
Australian Time Trial, Michael Rogers
Italian Time Trial, Marco Pinotti
Norwegian Time Trial, Edvald Boasson Hagen
Czech Time Trial, František Raboň
Luxembourg Time Trial, Kim Kirchen
German Time Trial, Bert Grabsch
Belgian Time Trial, Maxime Monfort
US Road Race, George Hincapie
2010
Belarusian Time Trial, Kanstantsin Sivtsov
German Time Trial, Tony Martin
Italian Time Trial, Marco Pinotti
Latvian Road Race, Aleksejs Saramotins
Slovak Time Trial, Martin Velits
2011
New Zealand Road Race, Hayden Roulston
Belarusian Time Trial, Kanstantsin Sivtsov
German Time Trial, Bert Grabsch
Irish Road Race, Matthew Brammeier
Irish Time Trial, Matthew Brammeier
Latvian Time Trial, Gatis Smukulis
UCI World Road Race, Mark Cavendish
