= James McCallum (cyclist) =

Scottish racing cyclist

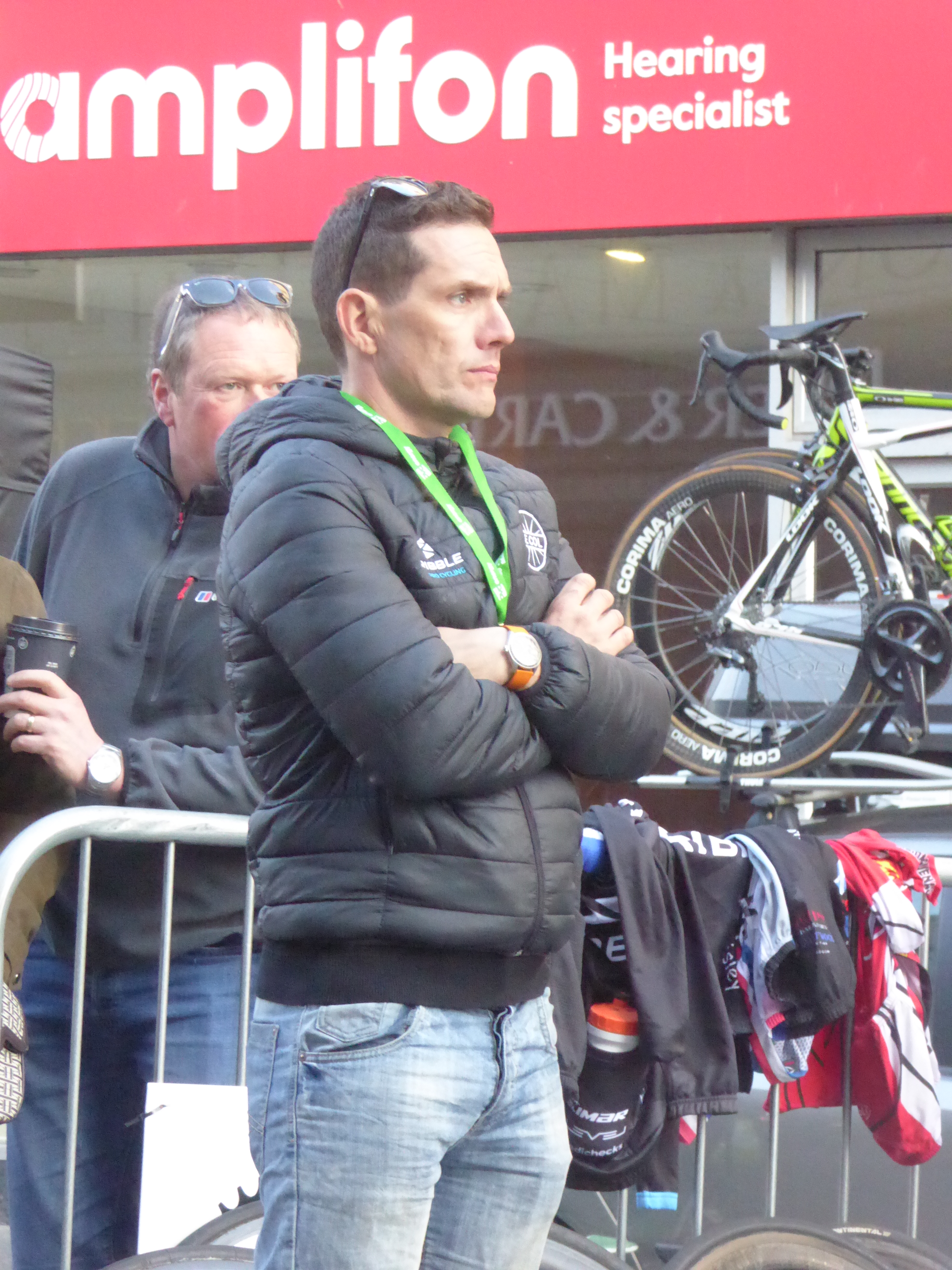
- McCallum in 2019

Personal information
- Full name: James McCallum
- Nicknames: Jimmy Mac; The King of Scotland
- Born: 27 April 1979 (age 47) Bellshill, Scotland
- Height: 1.75 m (5 ft 9 in)
- Weight: 74 kg (163 lb)

Cycling career
- Sport: Cycling
- Current team: Meta Bike Division; The Cycling Academy Race Team
- Disciplines: Track; Road; Gravel; Cyclo-cross
- Role: Rider; Directeur sportif; Coach

Amateur teams
- City of Edinburgh Racing Club
- 1998–2005: Pedal Power RT
- 2005: Clitheroe Bike Club
- 2005: Trackcycling.co.uk
- 2006: TheBicycleWorks
- 2015: Neon Velo
- 2019–: Meta Bike Division

Professional teams
- 2007–2008: Plowman Craven–Evans Cycles
- 2009–2010: Endura Racing
- 2011–2013: Rapha Condor–Sharp
- 2014: NFTO

Managerial teams
- 2015: Neon Velo
- 2015–2016: ONE Pro Cycling
- 2017: Team WNT
- 2019: Ribble Pro Cycling
- 2020–: The Cycling Academy Race Team

Major wins
- One-day races and Classics National Circuit Race Championships (2007)
Medal record
Men's track cycling
Representing Scotland
Commonwealth Games
Bronze medal – third place	2006 Melbourne	Scratch race

James McCallum (born 27 April 1979) is a Scottish multi-discipline racing cyclist, directeur sportif and coach. The winner of the 2007 British National Circuit Race Championships, McCallum also represented Scotland at four Commonwealth Games between 2002 and 2014, winning a bronze medal in the scratch race at the 2006 Commonwealth Games in Australia.

== Career ==
Born in Bellshill, McCallum worked night shifts, as a nurse, between racing and training until 2007. He became the Scottish Cycling Coordinator that year, combining the job with his racing and training, working to promote cycling in Scotland. McCallum's grandfather was a cyclist before him, but McCallum dabbled in many sports before settling on cycling. At one point he was a gymnast.

In 2011, McCallum joined the Champions in Schools project that helps to inspire Scotland's youth to follow a pathway to good health and sport, and set up his own coaching consultancy – Mach 10 Training Systems. Among the riders he has coached is two-time British National Circuit Race Championships winner Eileen Roe.

McCallum left Rapha Condor–JLT at the end of the 2013 season, and joined the NFTO squad for 2014. McCallum announced that he would be retiring from the sport after competing at the 2014 Commonwealth Games in Glasgow. After retiring from racing he became directeur sportif and general manager of the Neon Velo cycling team in 2015. In August 2015 he announced that he was joining ONE Pro Cycling as a coach and directeur sportif with immediate effect.

In 2016, McCallum broke Mark Beaumont's record for riding the North Coast 500, a 516-mile (830-kilometre) tourist route circumnavigating the top of Scotland, completing the distance in under 31 hours, with 28 hours 57 minutes spent in the saddle. The ride raised funds for Thrombosis UK in memory of his sister-in-law, Charlene Doolan. In the same year, he set up What's Your Meta – a performance clinic for athletes – and in 2020, he set up The Cycling Academy, a development team for young Scottish riders.

== Major results ==
2001
1st Kilo, Scottish Track Championships
3rd Team pursuit, National Track Championships (with Richard Chapman, David Lowe & Ross Muir)
2004
2nd Omnium, National Track Championships
2006
3rd Scratch, Commonwealth Games
2007
1st Circuit race, National Road Championships
1st Smithfield Nocturne
2nd Derny, National Track Championships
3rd Circuit race, Scottish Road Championships
2009
1st Omnium, National Track Championships
2011
2nd Smithfield Nocturne
2012
1st Road race, Scottish Road Championships
2nd Wales Open Criterium
3rd Rutland–Melton CiCLE Classic
2013
3rd Road race, Scottish Road Championships
2014
2nd Road race, Scottish Road Championships
3rd London Nocturne
4th Rutland–Melton CiCLE Classic

== See also ==
- City of Edinburgh Racing Club
- Achievements of members of City of Edinburgh Racing Club
