= British National Madison Championships =

British cycling national competition

The British National Madison Championships were held annually as part of the British National Track Championships organised by British Cycling, originally with two separate championship events for amateur and professional riders previously.

The senior championships are now held as a stand-alone event, most recently in December 2016.

From 2016, the senior championships have been run under the new UCI rules; where laps gained or lost on the field count towards points, and the winner is the pair of riders with the most points overall.

== Past winners ==
=== Men Senior ===
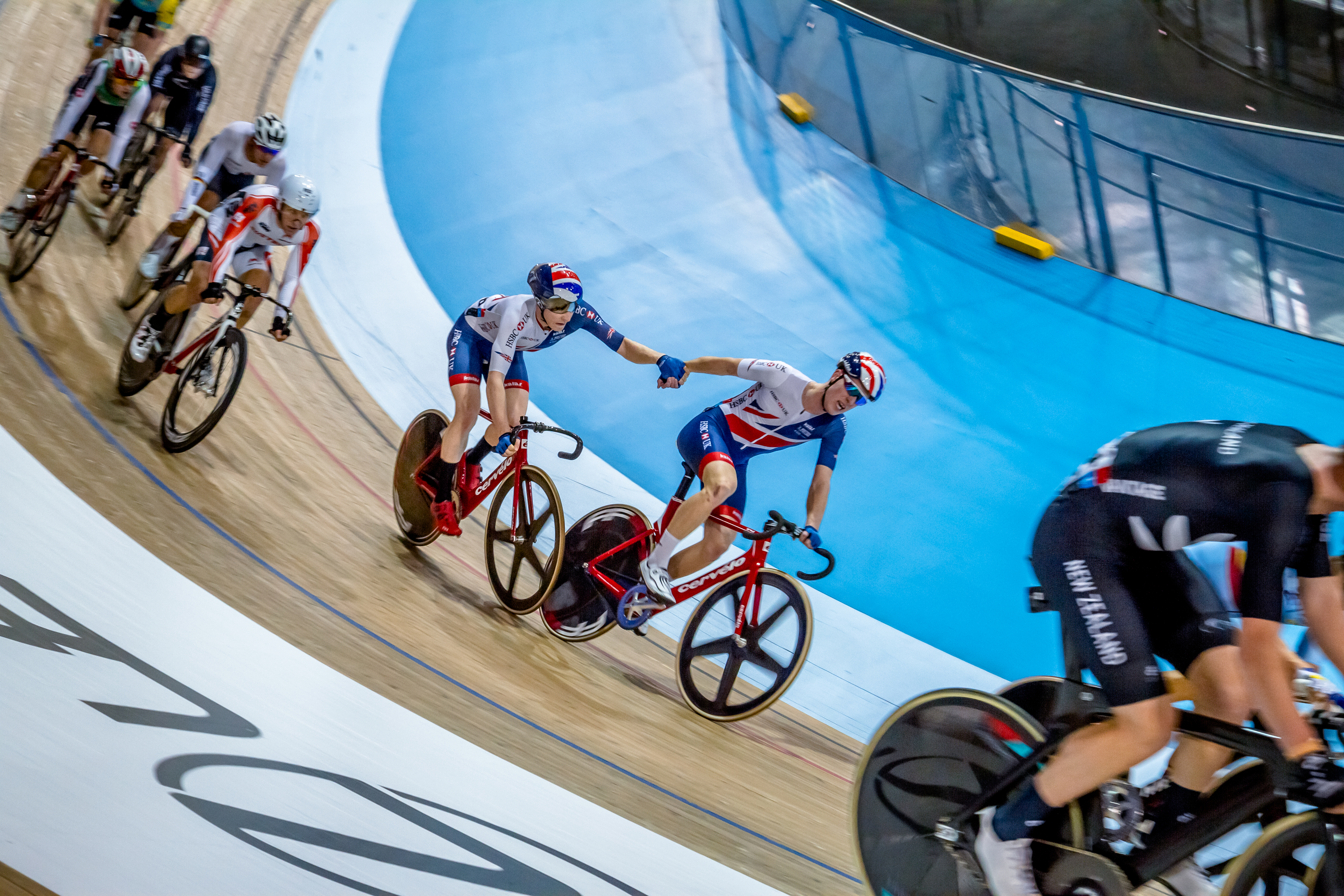
Madison exchange (in 2017), Oliver Wood (2014 winner) & Mark Stewart (2022 winner)

Year	Gold	Silver	Bronze	Ref
1966	Ian Alsop & Tony Gowland			
1967			Ian Alsop & Tony Gowland	
1968				
1969	Trevor Bull & Tony Gowland	Hugh Porter & Dave Bonner	Bert Hitchen & Bill Lawrie	
1970	Trevor Bull & Tony Gowland	Bert Hitchen & Bill Lawrie	Hugh Porter & Gordon Johnson	
1971	Geoff Wiles & Dave Nie	Ray Barker & Danny Horton	Trevor Bull & Tony Gowland	
1972	Tom Moloney & Murray Hall			
1973	Ian Hallam & Mick Bennett	Seve Heffernan		
1974 cancelled due to lack of entries				
1975	Ian Hallam & Mick Bennett	Maurice Burton & Steve Heffernan	Gary Cresswell & Hugh Cameron	
1976	Steve Heffernan & Paul Medhurst	Gary Cresswell & Hugh Cameron	Paul Fennell & Tony James	
1977	Tony Doyle & Glen Mitchell	Hugh Cameron & Gary Creswell	David Brotherton & Steve Mann	
1978	Hugh Cameron & Gary Creswell	Gerry Taylor & Derek Hunt	Shaun Fenwick & Paul Robilliard	
1979	Tony Doyle & Glen Mitchell	Gary Cresswell & Hugh Cameron	Paul Fennell & Tony James	
1980	Dave Akam & Tony James	Glen Mitchell & Sean Yates	Gary Cresswell & Hugh Cameron	
1981	Paul Curran & Stuart Morris	Gary Cresswell & Hugh Cameron	Dennis Lightfoot	
1982	Paul Curran & Hugh Cameron	Tony Fantham & Steve Gowar	Terry Tinsley & Phil Rayner	
1983	Paul Curran & Hugh Cameron	Glen Mitchell & Gerry Taylor		
1984	Paul Curran & Hugh Cameron	Gerry Taylor & Terry Taylor	Kevin Byers & Dennis Lightfoot	
1985	Greg Newton & Guy Rowland	Jon Walshaw & Martin Perrett	Nick Barnes & Russell Williams	
1986	Kevin Buyers & Russell Williams	Rob Muzio & Terry Taylor	Alastair Wood & Guy Rowland	
1987	Robert Coull & Alastair Wood	Paul Wain & Adrian Adgar	John Clarke & Peter Dickason	
1988	Robert Coull & Alastair Wood	Bruce Drew & Guy Rowland	David Baker & Martin Perrett	
1989	Gary Coltman & Russell Williams			
1990	Gary Coltman & Jon Walshaw			
1991	Gary Coltman & Jon Walshaw	Ray Hughes & Simon Lillistone	Bryan Steel & Colin Sturgess	
1992	Simon Lillistone & Bryan Steel	Gary Coltman & Russell Williams	Jon Walshaw & Spencer Wingrave	
1993	Spencer Wingrave & Tony Doyle	Simon Lillistone & Jon Walshaw	Hugh Cameron & Russell Williams	
1994	Bryan Steel & Rob Hayles	Simon Lillistone & Paul Jennings	Paul Curran & Chris Newton	
1995	Rob Hayles & Russell Williams	Bryan Steel & Spencer Wingrave	Simon Lillistone & Chris Newton	
1996	Bryan Steel & Simon Lillistone	Rob Hayles & Russell Williams	Jon Clay & Phil West	
1997	Rob Hayles & Russell Williams	Jon Clay & Bryan Steel	Jonathan Hargreaves & James Notley	
1998	Rob Hayles & Jon Clay	Phil West & James Notley	James Taylor & Rob Wood	
1999	Rob Hayles & Bradley Wiggins	Jon Clay & Russell Downing	Chris Bush & Dan Ellmore	
2000	Tony Gibb & James Taylor	James Notley & Rob Wodd	Rod Ellingworth & Jon Nunan	
2001	Tony Gibb & James Taylor	Rod Ellingworth & Phil West	James Notley & Rob Wodd	
2002	James Taylor & Huw Pritchard	Russell Williams & Bryan Taylor	Ben Hallam & Mark Kelly	
2003	Russell Downing & Dean Downing	Kieran Page & Huw Pritchard	Russell Anderson & Kristian House	
2004	Tony Gibb & James Taylor	Mark Cavendish & Edward Clancy	Matt Brammeier & Tom White	
2005	Tony Gibb & James Taylor	Ben Swift & Matthew Rowe	James Notley & Phil West	
2006	Tony Gibb & James Taylor	Adam Blythe & Matthew Rowe	Peter Kennaugh & Jonathan Bellis	
2007	Adam Blythe & Luke Rowe	John McClelland & Joel Stewart	Richard Prince & Ian Cooper	
2008	Peter Kennaugh & Mark Cavendish	Jonathan Bellis & Andrew Fenn	Steven Burke & Alex Dowsett	
2009	Mark Christian & Peter Kennaugh	Luke Rowe & Geraint Thomas	Andrew Fenn & Alex Dowsett	
2010	Luke Rowe & Mark Christian	Dan McLay & Sam Harrison	George Atkins & Erick Rowsell	
2011	Luke Rowe & Peter Kennaugh	Tom Moses & Jon Mould	Alex Dowsett & Tom Murray	
2012	Mark Christian & Simon Yates	Alex Dowsett & Tom Murray	George Atkins & Owain Doull	
2013	George Atkins & Jonathan Mould	Adam Blythe & Peter Kennaugh	Russell Downing & Jonathan McEvoy	
2014	Andy Tennant & Oliver Wood	Alex Dowsett & Joe Holt	Gabriel Cullaigh & Mark Stewart	
2016	Joe Holt & Ethan Hayter	Matthew Bostock & Matthew Walls	Jake Stewart & Fred Wright	
2017	Ethan Hayter & Matthew Walls	Joe Holt & Jake Stewart	William Tidball & Ethan Vernon	
2018	Matthew Walls & Fred Wright	Rhys Britton & Ethan Vernon	William Perret & Tom Ward	
2019	Rhys Britton & Fred Wright	Matthew Dobbins & Alex Haines	Alfred George & Max Rushby	
2020 & 2021 not held due to Covid-19
2022	William Perrett & Mark Stewart	Jack Brough & Oscar Nilsson-Julien	Jack Rootkin Gray & Robert Donaldson	
2023 not held due to lack of entries
2024	Frank Longstaff & Tom Ward	Alec Briggs & Joe Holt	James Ambrose-Parish & William Gilbank	
2025	Logan Maclean & William Perrett	Elliott Rowe & Oliver Wood	Henry Hobbs & Ben Wiggins	

=== Women's Senior ===
Year	Gold	Silver	Bronze	Ref
2009	Alex Greenfield & Dani King	Corrine Hall & Hannah Barnes	Hannah Mayho & Laura Trott	
2010	Hannah Barnes & Hannah Walker	Dani King & Ella Hopkins	Harriet Owen & Laura Trott	
2011	Lucy Garner & Harriet Owen	Hannah Barnes & Hannah Walker	Hannah Manley & Amy Roberts	
2012	Lucy Garner & Harriet Owen	Emily Kay & Amy Roberts	Hannah Barnes & Eileen Roe	
2013	Dani King & Laura Trott	Katie Archibald & Charline Joiner	Hayley Jones & Emily Kay	
2016	Elinor Barker & Laura Kenny	Alice Barnes & Ellie Dickinson	Megan Barker & Rebecca Raybould	
2017	Anna Docherty & Pfeiffer Georgi	Jenny Holl & Jessica Roberts	Abigail Dentus & Rebecca Raybould	
2018	Katie Archibald & Elinor Barker	Ellie Dickinson & Laura Kenny	Neah Evans & Emily Kay	
2019	Anna Docherty & Jenny Holl	Ella Barnwell & Amelia Sharpe	Eluned King & Sophie Lewis	
2020 & 2021 not held due to Covid-19
2022	Laura Kenny & Neah Evans	Sophie Lewis & Maddie Leech	Ella Barnwell & Jessica Roberts	
2023 & 2024 not held due to lack of entries
2025	Erin Boothman & Anna Morris	Katie Archibald & Maddie Leech	Millie Couzens & Sophie Lewis	

== Junior results ==
Extended content

Men's

Year	Gold	Silver	Bronze
2009	George Atkins & Dan McLay	Jon Mould & Chris Whorall	Adam Yates & Simon Yates
2010	Adam Yates & Simon Yates	Owain Doull & Joshua Papworth	Andrew Hargroves & Daniel McLay
2011	Jon Dibben & Owain Doull	Chris Latham & Joshua Papworth	Samuel Lowe & Alistair Slater
2012	Jon Dibben & Samuel Lowe	Tao Geoghegan Hart & Oliver Wood	Jake Kelly & Jacob Scott
2013	Jacob Ragan & Oliver Wood	Tristan Robbins & James Shaw	Tom Arnstein & Mark Stewart
2015	Ethan Hayter & Fred Wright	Joe Holt & William Roberts	Matthew Walls & Reece Woods
2016	Rhys Britton & Jake Stewart	Matthew Walls & Reece Wood	Ethan Hayter & Fred Wright
2017	Rhys Britton & Jake Stewart	Jacob Vaughan & Fred Wright	Joseph Nally & William Tidball
2018	William Tidball & Ethan Vernon	Lewis Askey & Alfred George	Oliver Rees & Samuel Watson
2019	Lewis Askey & Alfred George	Oscar Nilssen-Julien & Jack Rootkin-Gray	Max Rushby & Samuel Watson

Event not held in 2014

Women's

Year	Gold	Silver	Bronze
2017	Anna Docherty & Pfeiffer Georgi	Lauren Dolan & Jenny Holl	Jessica Roberts & Sophie Williams
2018	Elynor Bäckstedt & Ellie Russell	Anna Docherty & Pfeiffer Georgi	Georgia Ashworth & Ella Barnwell
2019	Elynor Bäckstedt & Zoe Bäckstedt	Eluned King & Sophie Lewis	Ella Barnwell & Amelia Sharpe

Male Under 16

Year	Gold	Silver	Bronze
2009	Jon Dibben & Jim Lewis	Stephen Bradbury & Charlie Heffernan	Matthew Rotherham & Dan Whelan
2011	Chris Lawless & Jacob Ragan	Jake Womersley & Oliver Wood	Jacob Scott & Jake Kelly
2012	Ben Chapman & Max Stedman	Tristan Robbins & Charlie Tanfield	Fabio Close & James Shaw
2013	Joseph Fry & Joey Walker	Tom England & Tom Rotherham	Matthew Walls & Reece Wood
2014	Ethan Hayter & Fred Wright	Matthew Walls & Reece Wood	Seb Dickens & Jack Plumley
2015	Rhys Britton & Fred Wright	Ben Hardwick & Jake Stewart	Tom Pidcock & Jamie Ridehalgh
2016	Thomas Bostock & William Draper	Charlie Calvert & William Tidball	Jim Brown & Matthew Burke
2017	Alex Haines & Lewis Askey	Oliver Rees & Samuel Watson	Alfred George & Leo Hayter
2018	Oscar Nilsson-Julien & Jack Rootkin-Gray	Robert Donaldson & Oliver Stockwell	Hugo Lutz-Atkinson & Joseph Pidcock
2019	Jack Brough & Joshua Giddings	Innes Harvey & Max Poole	Josh Charlton & Kieran Riley

Female Under 16

Year	Gold	Silver	Bronze
2011	Amy Hill & Emily Nelson	Alice Barnes & Melissa Lowther	Rebecca Hunt & Emily Kay
2012	Grace Garner & Abby-Mae Parkinson	Paige Milward & Lauren O'Brien	Megan Barker & Kimberley English
2013	Megan Barker & Jessica Roberts	Ellie Dickinson & Elizabeth Holden	Abigail Dentus & Lucy Shaw
2014	Ellie Dickinson & Jessica Roberts	Rhona Callander & Henrietta Colborne	Lauren Murphy & Rebecca Raybould
2015	Lauren Dolan & Pfeiffer Georgi	Anna Docherty & Sophie Williams	Rhona Callander & Jenny Holl
2016	Anna Docherty & Pfeiffer Georgi	Georgia Ashworth & Ellie Russell	Gabriella Homer & April Tacey
2017	Elynor Backstedt & Zoe Backstedt	Josie Griffin & Sophie Lewis	Amy Monkhouse & Elena Smith
2018	Emma Finucane & Sophie Lewis	Imani Pereira-James & Eva Young	Imogen Chastell & Eluned King
2019	Zoe Backstedt & Millie Couzens	Madelaine Leech & Morven Yeoman	Grace Lister & Flora Perkins
