= British National Team Pursuit Championships =

British cycling national competition

The British National Team Pursuit Championships are held annually as part of the British National Track Championships organized by British Cycling. Prior to 1996, there were two separate team pursuit championship events for amateur and professional riders. A women's championship was later added, competing over a shorter 3 km distance with three riders, until 2013 when this was increased to 4 km with 4 riders as in the men's event.

== Venues and dates ==
- 1937-1950 Herne Hill Velodrome
- 1967–1968, 1971 Quibell Park Stadium, Scunthorpe
- 1960–1966, 1969 Aldersley Stadium, Wolverhampton
- 1973–1994 (Leicester Velodrome)
- 1995–2020, 2024 (Manchester Velodrome)
- 2016 (not held)
- 2022–2023, 2025 (Geraint Thomas National Velodrome)

== Men's Senior ==
Year	Gold	Silver	Bronze	Ref
1926	Derby RCC; Harry Wyld; Percy Wyld; Lew Wyld; Ronald Wyld	Norwood Paragon		
1927	Derby RCC; Harry Wyld; Percy Wyld; Lew Wyld; Ronald Wyld	Norwood Paragon		
1928	Derby RCC; Harry Wyld; Percy Wyld; Lew Wyld; Ronald Wyld	Norwood Paragon		
1929	Norwood Paragon; Frank Southall; Monty Southall; Charlie Hallerback; Charlie Bowtle	Walsall Roads CC		
1930	Norwood Paragon; Frank Southall; Monty Southall; Charlie Hallerback; Bill Burl	Marlborough AC		
1931	Belle Vue CC; J C Wyatt; Charles Madelaine	Norwood Paragon; Frank Southall; Stan Butler; Charlie Hallerback; Jimmy Dicks	SF-Brighton Stanley Wanderers & Doncaster Wheelers	
1932	Belle Vue CC; E A Johnson; Arthur Sier; J C Wyatt; Charles Madelaine	Norwood Paragon; Bill Burl; Charlie Hallerback; Arthur Bristow; Monty Southall	SF-Plymouth Corinthians & Monckton	
1933	Poole Wheelers; William Harvell; Ray Cleal; Norman Barnes; Ernie Holmwood	Sutton-in-Ashfield H&CC	SF-Belle Vue CC & Monckton	
1934	Rover RCC	Marlborough AC	SF-Luton Wheelers & Poole Wheelers	
1935	Marlborough AC	Polytechnic CC	SF- Sutton-in-Ashfield H&CC & Portsmouth North End	
1936	Belle Vue CC	Polytechnic CC	Rover Racing CC & Sheffield	
1937	Catford CC; Lionel Irvin; Percy Sopp; Basil Talbot; Les Warham	Norwood Paragon CC; Stan Butler; Jim Hampshire; Stan Harrison; Fred Willet	Belle Vue CC	
1938	Belle Vue CC; W. C. Ashby; Fleming; C. T. King; N. Barnes	Norwood Paragon CC; Ivor Cox; Jim Hampshire; Jim Parkes; Fred Willett	SF-Sutton-in-Ashfield H&CC & Monckton	
1947	Manchester Wheelers; Reg Harris; Cyril Cartwright; Alan Geldard; Alan Bannister; N W Brown			
1948				
1949	Rover Racing CC; Tommy Goodwin; Frank Bell; E H Bridgewater; P Olney	Willesden CC		
1950	Norwood Paragon; Don Chamberlain; Ronald Stretton; Pete Smith; Maurice Jeffries	Rover Racing CC; Tommy Goodwin; Frank Bell	SF-Manchester Wheelers	
1951	East Midlands Clarion	Manchester Wheelers	SF-Dulwich Paragon & Western Command Army	
1952	East Midlands Clarion; Ron Meadwell; George Newberry; Billy Jones; Peter Brotherton	Bec CC	SF- London Polytechnic Coventry CC; Ray Oakes; Gerry Walters; Bernard Rosser; Pete Proctor	
1953	Norwood Paragon; Maurice Jeffries; Ronald Stretton; Pete Smith; Wally Happy	Manchester Wheelers; Alan Newton; Alan Geldard; Don Smith; Alan Danson	SF- London Polytechnic & Willesden CC	
1954	declared null and void			
1955	Polytechnic CC			
1956	Norwood Paragon; Alan Large; Robin Buchan; Don Ward; Wally Happy			
1957	Polytechnic CC; Peter Goodwin	Norwood Paragon; Alan Large; Robin Buchan; Pete Smith; Wally Happy	East Midlands Clarion	
1958	Melling Wheelers A Norman Sheil; Billy Aeons; John Geddes; John Plumbley	Clarence Wheelers; Brian Elliott; Mike Gambrill; Alan Jacob; Alan Killick	Melling Wheelers B	
1959	Clarence Wheelers; Mike Gambrill; Robin Gambrill; Alan Jacob; Alan Killick	Melling Wheelers		
1960	Melling Wheelers; Charlie McCoy; Joe McLean; David Telfer; George Evans	Wolverhampton Wheelers	Coventry CC	
1961	Norwood Paragon; Alan Sturgess; Robin Buchan; Keith Butler; Don Ward	De Laune CC	SF-Whitewebbs CC	
1962	Old Portlians; Dave Bonner; Ian Jewell; Paul Burgess; Leo Murley	Melling Wheelers	SF-Festival RC	
1963	Polytechnic CC; Ian Alsop; Pete Robinson	Old Portlians	Festival RC	
1964	Wolverhampton Wheelers; William Painter	Old Portlians	Polytechnic CC; Ian Alsop	
1965	Solihull CC; Trevor Bull; Graham Webb; Roy Cromack; Andy King			
1966	Solihull CC; Trevor Bull; Graham Webb; Roy Cromack; Barry Moss	Polytechnic CC; Ian Alsop		
1967	Birmingham RCC; Roy Cox; Trevor Bull; John Patston; Fred Booker	North London; Sean Bannister; Ian Alsop		
1968	Polytechnic CC; Ian Alsop; Sean Bannister; Alan Rochford; Alf Engers	Birmingham RCC		
1969				
1970	Birmingham RCC			
1971	Birmingham RCC; Alan Lloyd; John Patston; Bob Jones; Dave Bond	34 Nomads	Kirkby	
1972				
1973	Birmingham RCC	34 Nomads	Archer RC; Alaric Gayfer; Steve Heffernan; Hall; Price; Dave Densley	
1974	Archer RC	Birmingham RCC	34 Nomads	
1975	Archer RC; Maurice Burton; Robin Crocker; Steve Heffernan; Alaric Gayfer	34 Nomads	Birmingham RC	
1976	Archer RC; Alaric Gayfer; Steve Heffernan; Robin Croker; Brian Milner	Teesside Clarion; Martin Stainsby; Hugh Cameron; Gary Cresswell; Stuart Morris	34 Nomads; Dave Peachey; Glen Mitchell; Peter Hamilton; Peter Malyon	
1977	34 Nomads & C P Hart; Ron Keeble; Peter Hamilton; Rik Evans; Glen Mitchell	VC Europa; Terry Holmes; Alan Rice; Dave Patten; Nigel Redmile	Halesowen ACC	
1978	Teesside Clarion	VC Europa Red	VC Europa Blue	
1979	34 Nomads; Ron Keeble; Peter Hamilton; Tony James; Glen Mitchell	Altrincham; Mike Williams; John Herety; Ian Donohue; Ian Binder	Tim Stevens; Sean Yates; Steven Sefton; Roland O'Donnell	
1980	VC Europa; Piers Hewitt, Roy Crombie; Steve Denton, Gary Sadler	Altrincham; Nigel Redmile, John Herety; Ian Binder, Ian Donohue	Gemini BC; Dave Akam, Paul Dennis; Steve Homewood, Steve White	
1981	Manchester Wheelers; Hugh Cameron, Gary Cresswell; Greg Newton, Darryl Webster	VC Europa		
1982	Manchester Wheelers; Hugh Cameron, Phil Rayner; Greg Newton, Darryl Webster	Velo Club Nottingham; Gary Sadler, Tony Mayer; Keith Reynolds, Sandy Gilchrist	Stoke ACCS or GS Strada	
1983	Manchester Wheelers			
1984	Manchester Wheelers; Paul Curran			
1985	Manchester Wheelers	Dinnington RC	Paragon RT	
1986	Manchester Wheelers	Team Haverhill	Dinnington RC (A)	
1987	Manchester Wheelers	Team Haverhill	Dinnington RC	
1988	Manchester Wheelers	Dinnington RC (A)	Team Haverhill	
1989	Manchester Wheelers; Chris Boardman, Scott O'Brien; Glen Sword & Tim Warriner	Team Haverhill; Simon Lillistone, Spencer Wingrave; Bryan Steel & Paul Penton	Zenith CC; Martin Perrett, Jeff Giddings; Paul Carpenter & Adam Wykes	
1990	Team Haverhill	Olympia Sport	Leicestershire RC; Phil Rayner, Martin Webster; Martin Ludlam & Colin Griffiths	
1991	Manchester Wheelers; Chris Boardman, Glen Sword; Scott O'Brien & Richard Hughes	Team Haverhill	VC St Raphael; Paul Jennings, Andrew Forbes	
1992	Team Haverhill	VC St Raphael	Dinnington RC	
1993	North Wirral Velo; Chris Boardman, Jon Walshaw; Paul Jennings & Matt Illingworth	Team Haverhill; Adrian Allen, Andy Forbes; Rob Hayles & Bryan Steel	Dinnington RC; Tony Doyle, Paul Curran; Matthew Charity & Spencer Wingrave	
1994	North Wirral Velo; Stuart Dangerfield, Simon Lillistone; Matt Illingworth & Glen Sword	Team Haverhill; Adrian Allen, Christopher Ball; Rob Hayles & Bryan Steel	City of Edinburgh; Jamie Henderson, Graeme Herd; Scott McWilliam & Martin Williamson	
1995	North Wirral Velo; Simon Lillistone, Chris Newton; Paul Jennings & Julian Ramsbottom	City of Edinburgh; Jamie Henderson, Graeme Herd; Nicky Hall & Martin Williamson	De Laune CC; Justin Clarke, Dominic Cooper; Daniel Rudd & Stuart Shand	
1996	Harlow CC; Chris Ball, Matt Illingworth; James Taylor & Shaun Wallace	City of Edinburgh; Chris Hoy, Graeme Herd, Nick Hall; Martin Williamson, Craig MacLean & Neil Walker	Gill Airways, Peugeot	
1997	Harlow CC; Chris Ball, Adam Dallison; Matt Illingworth & Sion Jones	City of Edinburgh; Chris Hoy, Craig MacLean, Scott McWilliam; Steve Whitcome, Richard Chapman & Neil Walker	Cwmcarn Paragon	
1998	Team Brite; Jon Clay, Rob Hayles; Matt Illingworth & Bryan Steel	Pacific Flanders & Atom Elite; Justin Clarke, Jonathan Hargreaves; Sion Jones & Robert Wood	City of Edinburgh & Walkers; Richard Chapman, Neil Walker; Stephen Whitcombe & Nicholas Hall	
1999	Linda McCartney Racing Team; Russell Downing, Matt Illingworth, Chris Newton & Julian Winn	VC St Raphael; Neil Campbell, Dean Downing, Andrew Russell & Mark Whittaker	City of Edinburgh RC; Nicky Hall, Craig MacLean, Derek Smith & James Taylor	
2000	Scunthorpe Polytechnic; Jason Benham, Robert Darley, Gary Lang & Chris Richardson	Atom Elite RT; Jonathon Nunan, Alex Crichter, Dave Ebbrell & David Lowe		
2001	Team McEll; Tim Buckle, Steve Cummings, Rod Ellingworth & Phil West	VC St Raphael; Benedict Elliott, Paul Manning, James Notley & Andrew Russell	City of Edinburgh; Richard Chapman, David Lowe, James McCallum & Ross Muir	
2002	VC St Raphael; Benedict Elliott, Phil West, James Notley & Jason Streather	Scienceinsport.com; Keith Murray, Stuart Wearmouth, Timothy Lawson & Neil Rothwell	Sheffield 220 City Road Racing; Mike Cubison, Daniel Smith, Richard Teare & Marcus Smith	
2003	VC St Raphael; Paul Manning, James Notley, Andrew Russell & Phil West	VC de Londres; Dominic Hill, John Scripps, Bryan Taylor & Tom White	Dataphonics RT; Bruce Edgar, Ben Hallam, Stuart Shawcross & Mark Cavendish	
2004	Team Persil A Chris Newton, Paul Manning, Tom White & Mark Cavendish	Team Persil B Rob Hayles, Steve Cummings, Ed Clancy & Matt Brammeier	Dataphonics RT; Tom Walters, Ben Swift, Jon Mosley & Ian Stannard	
2005	North West Division; Ed Clancy, Mark Cavendish, Steve Cummings & Geraint Thomas	Glendene CC; Jonathan Bellis, Alex Dowsett, Russell Hampton & Matthew Rowe	VC St Raphael; Andrew Russell, Jason Streather, Benedict Elliott & Tom Walters	
2006	Composite A Ed Clancy, Steve Cummings, Paul Manning & Chris Newton	Recycling.co.uk; Ross Sander, Ian Stannard, Ben Swift & Geraint Thomas	Glendene CC; Jonathan Bellis, Peter Kennaugh, Luke Rowe & Alex Dowsett	
2007	100% ME; Russell Hampton, Jonathan Bellis, Andy Tennant & Steven Burke	Agiskoviner.com; Christopher Richardson, Joel Stewart, Adam Duggleby & John McClelland	VC St Raphael; Alan Peet, Richard Prince, Jason Streather, Ian Cooper & Benedict Elliott	
2008	Agiskoviner.com; Christopher Richardson, Joel Stewart, Jonathan Mould, John McClelland & James Boyman	VC St Raphael; Alan Peet, Thomas Price, Jason Streather, Ian Cooper & Benedict Elliott	MJS Racing; Martin Osman, George Bate, Jack Hibberd Ben Stockdale & Ross Dingley	
2009	Planet X Sam Harrison, Andrew Magnier, Ian Cooper & Boyd Roberts	Agiskoviner; Jack Kirk, James Holland-Leader, Jonathan Mould, & John McClelland	VC St Raphael; Chris Bush, Jason Streather, Benedict Elliott & Jack Green; Scunthorpe Poly; Paul Barber, John Brearley, Jamie Rogers & Anthony Nash	
2010	VC St Raphael; Ben Elliot, Jack Green; Chris Bush & Barney Storey	Scienceinsport.com; Jody Cundy, Tim Lawson, Adam Duggleby & Alistair Rutherford	Cyclepremier.com Metaltek; Andrew Magnier, Rich Hepworth; Jason White & Simon Wilson	
2011	Hargroves Cycles; Jon Dibben, Owain Doull, Alistair Slater & Peter Dibben	Scienceinsport.com; Adam Duggleby, Al Rutherford; Adam Yates & Tim Lawson	Cyclepremier.com; Simon Wilson, Tony Gibb; Matt Rowe & Jason White	
2012	100% ME; Owain Doull, Sam Harrison, Alistair Slater & Simon Yates	Champion System; Christopher Latham, Chris Lawless, Alistair Rutherford & Jacob Ragan	Hargroves Cycles; Jon Dibben, Samuel Lowe, Luc Hall & Andrew Hargroves	
2013	Wheelbase Altura MGD; Adam Duggleby, Timothy Lawson, Jacob Ragan & Alistair Rutherford	Prestige VC; Andrew Hastings, John McClelland, Alex Minting & Kristian Woolf	VC St Raphael; Ben Elliott, Jack Green, Barney Storey & Alex Wise	
2014	100% ME; Germain Burton, Christopher Latham, Chris Lawless & Oliver Wood	NFTO Pro Cycling; Adam Blythe, Russell Downing, Sam Harrison & Jon Mould	The Rigmar Racers; Alistair Rutherford, Philip Trodden, Finlay Young, Jack Barratt & Ryan Fenwick	
2015	100%ME; Germain Burton, Jake Kelly; Mark Stewart & Oliver Wood	Scottish Development; Peter Anderson, Tom Arnstein; Philip Trodden & Ruari Yeoman	Scottish Juniors; Andy Brown, Tom Chandler; Angus Claxton & Lewis Mulholland	
2017	Brother NRG; Daniel Bigham, Charlie Tanfield; Jacob Tipper & Jonathan Wale	100% ME; Matthew Bostock, Ethan Hayter; Joe Holt & Matthew Walls	Mixed; Andy Brown, Angus Claxton; Joseph Nally & Evan Oliphant	
2018	100% ME; Rhys Britton, Ethan Hayter; Matthew Walls & Fred Wright	Team KGF; Daniel Bigham, Charlie Tanfield; Jacob Tipper & Jonathan Wale	Team KGF; John Archibald, Harry Tanfield; Ethan Vernon, Simon Wilson	
2019	HUUB-Wattbike; John Archibald, Daniel Bigham; Charlie Tanfield & Jonathan Wale	Team Inspired; Rhys Britton, William Tidball; Ethan Vernon & Fred Wright	Wales Racing Academy; Matthew Burke, Daniel Coombe; Oscar Mingay, William Roberts & Samuel Tillett	
2020	HUUB-Wattbike Test Team; John Archibald, Jonathan Wale; Daniel Bigham & William Perrett	Team Inspired; Rhys Britton, Alfred George; Ethan Vernon & Samuel Watson	AeroLab Ward WheelZ A Sebastian Garry, Michael Gill; Tom Ward & Oliver Hucks	
2021 not held due to Covid-19
2022	Team Wales; Rhys Britton; Joe Holt; Harvey McNaughton; William Roberts; Joshua Tarling	Team East Midlands; Jack Brough; Kyle Gordon; William Perrett; Tom Ward	Fensham Howes - MAS Design; Alex Beldon; Matthew Brennan; Jed Smithson; Ben Wiggins	
2023	Saint Piran; Josh Charlton; Charlie Tanfield; William Tidball; William Roberts	Team East Midlands; Michael Gill; Sebastian Garry; William Perrett; Tom Ward	Fensham Howes - MAS Design; Alex Beldon; Matthew Brennan; Jed Smithson; Ben Wiggins	
2024	Team Wales; Sam Fisher; Will Roberts; Will Salter; Finlay Tarling	WKG – WardPerformanceUK; Sebastian Garry; Michael Gill; Will Perrett; Tom Ward	Not awarded	
2025	Team Wales; Rory Gravelle; William Roberts; Rhys Britton; Will Salter; Sam Fisher	University of Derby Cycling Club; Philip Campbell; Peter Ferguson; Ben Marsh; Rhys Rhomas	Not awarded	

== Women's Senior ==
Year	Gold	Silver	Bronze	Ref
2010	Horizon Fitness; Sarah Storey, Dani King; Alex Greenfield	Orbea For Goodness Shakes; Rebecca Romero, Janet Birkmyre; Emily Wix	Team Terminator; Louise Satherley, Donna Williams; Estelle Rogers	
2011	Horizon Fitness; Dani King, Joanna Rowsell; Sarah Storey	Motorpoint; Hannah Barnes, Lucy Garner; Harriet Owen	For Viored; Amy Roberts, Rohan Battison; Hannah Manley	
2012	Scot Contessa Epic; Emily Kay, Elinor Barker; Amy Roberts	Node 4 Giordana; Lucy Garner, Corrine Hall; Harriet Owen	Team Ibis Cycles; Hannah Barnes, Kayleigh Brogan; Eileen Roe	
2013	Wiggle Honda; Elinor Barker, Dani King, Joanna Rowsell, Laura Trott	VC St Raphael; Eleanor Jones, Madeline Moore, Adel Tyson-Bloor, Rachel Murray	(only two teams started the event)	
2014	Wiggle Honda; Elinor Barker, Danielle King, Joanna Rowsell, Laura Trott	Pearl Izumi; Katie Archibald. Ciara Horne, Sarah Storey, Anna Turvey	VC St Raphael; Jessica Hill, Madeline Moore, Rachel Murray, Harriet Whewell	
2015	Pearl Izumi; Katie Archibald, Ciara Horne; Joanna Rowsell Shand, Sarah Storey	not awarded		
2017	Team Breeze; Eleanor Dickinson, Manon Lloyd; Emily Nelson, Annasley Park	Liv Cycling Club; Lauren Dolan, Pfeiffer Georgi; Jessica Roberts, Emily Tillett	Boot Out Breast Cancer C.C; Neah Evans, Dannielle Khan; Katie Prankerd, Sarah Storey	
2018	Team Breeze; Abigail Dentus, Jenny Holl; Rebecca Raybould, Jessica Roberts	Backstedt Cycling; Elynor Bäckstedt, Isabel Ellis; Lucy Nelson, Ellie Russell	Liv Cycling Club; Ella Barnwell, Anna Docherty; Pfeiffer Georgi, Amelia Sharpe	
2019	Team Breeze; Anna Docherty, Jenny Holl; Rebecca Raybould, Jessica Roberts	Team Velotec; Jennifer Holden, Sophie Lankford; Anna Morris, Molly Patch, April Tacey	Liv Cycling Club; Ella Barnwell, Eluned King; Amelia Sharpe, Elena Smith	
2020	Team Breeze; Anna Docherty, Josie Knight; Ella Barnwell, Anna Shackley	University of Nottingham; Isabel Ellis, Sophie Lankford; Matilda Gurney, Charlotte Mitchell	Central Region; Millie Couzens, Anna Wadsworth; Eva Callinan, Libby Smithson	
2021 not held due to Covid-19
2022	Brother UK-Orientation Marketing; Ellen Bennett; Grace Lister; Holly Ramsey; Izzy Sharp	Liv Cycling Club; Katie-Anne Calton; Ella Jamieson; Matilda McKibben; Awen Roberts	not awarded	
2023	Team Inspired; Ella Barnwell; Maddie Leech; Grace Lister; Jessica Roberts	Alba Development; Sophie Lankford; Beth Maciver; Eilidh Shaw; Evie White	Tofauti Everyone Active; Mari Porton; Lowri Richards; Esther Wong; Laura Davies	
2024	Team Inspired; Maddie Leech; Grace Lister; Kate Richardson; Izzy Sharp	Tofauti Everyone Active; Mari Porton; Erin Boothman; Carys Lloyd; Abigail Miller	Solas Cycling; Molly Evans; Millie Thomson; Isla McCutcheon; Kayla Dinnan	
2025	Team Wales; Aelwen Davies; Anna Lloyd; Ciara Oliva; Mabli Phillips; Seren Thomas	Team Jadan; Katie-Anne Calton; Charlotte Hodgkins-Byrne; Mathilde Pauls; Dannielle Watkinson	The Muppet Show; Melanie Dobbins; Alison Fovargue; Madeline Moore; Melanie Sneddon	

== See also ==
British National Track Championships
