= 2012 British National Track Championships =

- Venue: Manchester, England
- Date: 26–30 September 2012
- Velodrome: Manchester Velodrome

The 2012 British National Track Championships were a series of track cycling competitions held from 26–30 September 2012 at the Manchester Velodrome. They are organised and sanctioned by British Cycling, and were open to British cyclists.

== Medal summary ==
=== Men's Events ===
Event	Gold	Silver	Bronze
1 Km Time Trial	Kian Emadi	Bruce Croall	Matt Rotherham
Sprint	Callum Skinner	Lewis Oliva	Matthew Crampton
Keirin	Matthew Crampton	Matt Rotherham	Craig MacLean
Team sprint	David Daniell; Peter Mitchell; Lewis Oliva	Bruce Croall; John Paul; Callum Skinner	Matthew Crampton; Jody Cundy; Craig MacLean
Individual Pursuit	Owain Doull	Jon Dibben	Douglas Dewey
Team pursuit	Owain Doull; Sam Harrison; Alistair Slater; Simon Yates	Christopher Latham; Chris Lawless; Alistair Rutherford; Jacob Ragan	Jon Dibben; Samuel Lowe; Luc Hall; Andrew Hargroves
Points	George Atkins	Owain Doull	Zachery May
Scratch	Adam Duggleby	Jon Dibben	Adam Yates
Omnium	Simon Yates	Joseph Kelly	George Atkins

=== Women's Events ===
Event	Gold	Silver	Bronze
500m time trial	Becky James	Victoria Williamson	Dannielle Khan
Sprint	Becky James	Victoria Williamson	Dannielle Khan
Keirin	Becky James	Victoria Williamson	Charline Joiner
Team sprint	Rachel James; Becky James	Eleanor Richardson; Lauryn Therin	Megan Boyd; Jessica Crampton
Individual Pursuit	Lucy Garner	Charline Joiner	Hannah Barnes
Team pursuit	Emily Kay; Elinor Barker; Amy Roberts	Lucy Garner; Corrine Hall; Harriet Owen	Hannah Barnes; Kayleigh Brogan; Eileen Roe
Points	Corrine Hall	Charline Joiner	Hannah Barnes
Scratch	Janet Birkmyre	Lisa Daly	Kayleigh Brogan
