= 2011 British National Track Championships =

- Venue: Manchester, England
- Date: 28 September – 2 October 2011
- Velodrome: Manchester Velodrome

The 2011 British National Track Championships were held between 28 September 2011 and 2 October 2011. The event was organised by British Cycling, and competitions of various track cycling disciplines in age, gender and disability categories were held.

The competition was staged at the National Track Cycling Centre at the Manchester Velodrome, the venue for the track cycling at the 2002 Commonwealth Games.

The event was notable for the return to form of Sir Chris Hoy, who claimed three national titles, and the emergence of Jonathan Mould, and the future world champions Becky James and Lizzie Armitstead, who won two titles each.

== Para-cycling performances ==
The championships featured several notable performances in para-cycling events. On the opening day, Jon-Allan Butterworth established a world record in the para-cycling time trial while winning the national title. He claimed a second title in the 200-metre flying-start time trial the following day, when three para-cycling world records were recorded. In the para-cycling pursuit on 30 September, Aileen McGlynn, riding with pilot Helen Scott, won the national title.

== Events - Elite level ==
Event	Gold		Silver		Bronze	
Men's Events
1 km Time Trial	Matt Rotherham scienceinsport.com	1:03.671	Steven Burke; Team UK Youth	1:03.941	Sam Harrison; 100% ME	1:04.790
Sprint	Sir Chris Hoy; Sky Track Cycling	10.362; 10.408	David Daniell; Motorpoint Pro Cycling		Jason Kenny; Sky Track cycling	10.876; 10.647
Team sprint	Sir Chris Hoy; Jason Kenny; Jason Queally	44.262	David Daniell; Ross Edgar; Peter Mitchell	44.648	Kian Emadi; Philip Hindes; Liam Phillips	45.019
Keirin	Sir Chris Hoy; Sky Track Cycling		David Daniell; Motorpoint Pro Cycling		Philip Hindes unattached.	
Individual Pursuit	Steven Burke; Team UK Youth	ct. in 3:59.758	Sam Harrison; 100% ME		Jon Dibben; Hargroves Cycles	4:32.201
Team pursuit	Jon Dibben; Owain Doull; Alistair Slater; Peter Dibben; Hargroves Cycles	4.16.249	Adam Duggleby; Al Rutherford; Adam Yates; Tim Lawson scienceinsport.com	4.19.145	Simon Wilson; Tony Gibb; Matt Rowe; Jason White cyclepremier.com	4.22.904
Points	Peter Kennaugh; Sky Racing Team	85 pts	Jonathan Mould; 100% ME	67 pts	Mark Christian; 100% ME	64 pts
Scratch	Jonathan Mould; 100% ME		Adam Duggleby scienceinsport.com		Adam Yates scienceinsport.com	
Omnium; 4 events	Jonathan Mould; 100% ME	7 pts	Simon Yates scienceinsport.com	8 pts	Adam Yates scienceinsport.com	17 pts
Women's Events
500m time trial	Jessica Varnish; Halesowen A & CC	34.500	Becky James; Abergavenney RC	35.142	Laura Trott; 100% ME	35.980
Sprint	Becky James; Abergavenney RC	2 - 0 v Jessica Varnish	Jessica Varnish; Halesowen A & CC		Victoria Williamson; Welwyn Whis CC	2 - 0 v Jessica Crampton
Team sprint	Victoria Pendleton; Jessica Varnish	33.541	Kayleigh Brogan; Jenny Davis	36.311	Janet Birkmyre; Cassiee Gledhill	37.457
Keirin	Becky James; Abergavenney RC		Jessica Crampton; Sport City Velo		Victoria Williamson; Welwyn Whis CC	
Individual Pursuit	Joanna Rowsell; Horizon Fitness	3:30.434	Laura Trott; 100% ME	3:33.272	Wendy Houvenaghel; Bikechain Ricci	3:32.283 v Sarah Storey
Team pursuit	Dani King; Joanna Rowsell; Sarah Storey; Horizon Fitness	caught opp.	Hannah Barnes; Lucy Garner; Harriet Owen; Motorpoint	caught by opp.	Amy Roberts; Rohan Battison; Hannah Manley; For Viored	caught opp.
Points	Lizzie Armitstead; Garmin Cervelo	58 pts	Laura Trott; 100% ME	50 pts	Joanna Rowsell; Horizon Fitness	36 pts
Scratch	Lizzie Armitstead; Garmin Cervelo		Laura Trott; 100% ME		Dani King; Horizon Fitness	
