= Cycling at the 2011 Commonwealth Youth Games =

Cycling at the IV Commonwealth Youth Games
- Host city: Isle of Man
- Dates: September

Cycling was one of the seven sports at the 2011 Commonwealth Youth Games in the Isle of Man from 9 to 11 September 2011. 10 events were scheduled to be contested, 5 for both boys and girls. Each Commonwealth Games Association could send up to four athletes per event. The age of participating athletes was limited to 17- and 18-year-olds only. This meant that for the 2011 Games athletes must have been born in 1993 or 1994 to be eligible to take part.

== Medal summary ==
=== Road cycling ===
Men

Event	Gold	Silver	Bronze
Men's road race	Caleb Ewan; Australia (AUS)	Owain Doull; Wales (WAL)	Jack Beckinsale; Australia (AUS)
Men's team road race	Caleb Ewan; Jack Beckinsale; Robert McCarthy; Alex Morgan; Australia (AUS)	Jon Dibben; Matthew Holmes; Sam Lowe; England (ENG)	Owain Doull; Dan Pearson; Wales (WAL)
Women's road race	Lucy Garner; England (ENG)	Emily Roper; Australia (AUS)	Hannah Barnes; England (ENG)
Women's team road race	Lucy Garner; Hannah Barnes; Harriet Owen; England (ENG)	Emily Roper; Jess Mundy; Allison Rice; Jess Allen; Australia (AUS)	Amy Roberts; Elinor Barker; Wales (WAL)
Men's time trial	Alex Morgan; Australia (AUS)	Jack Beckinsale; Australia (AUS)	Jon Dibben; England (ENG)
Men's team time trial	Caleb Ewan; Jack Beckinsale; Robert McCarthy; Alex Morgan; Australia (AUS)	Jon Dibben; Matthew Holmes; Sam Lowe; England (ENG)	Elliott Doyle; Simon-Pierre Gauthier; Charles Matte; David Onsow; Canada (CAN)
Women's time trial	Hannah Barnes; England (ENG)	Jess Allen; Australia (AUS)	Elinor Barker; Wales (WAL)
Women's team time trial	Lucy Garner; Hannah Barnes; Harriet Owen; England (ENG)	Amy Roberts; Elinor Barker; Wales (WAL)	Emily Roper; Jess Mundy; Allison Rice; Jess Allen; Australia (AUS)
Men's criterium	Robert McCarthy; Australia (AUS)	Jon Dibben; England (ENG)	Jack Beckinsale; Australia (AUS)
Women's criterium	Hannah Barnes; England (ENG)	Elinor Barker; Wales (WAL)	Lucy Garner; England (ENG)

== Results ==
=== Men's time trial ===
The Men's time trial took place on 9 September 2011.

Rank	Rider	Time
1	(Australia) Alex Morgan	09:00
2	(Australia) Jack Beckinsale	09:11
3	(England) Jon Dibben	09:17
4	(Wales) Owain Doull	09:17
5	(Australia) Robert McCarthy	09:35
6	(Australia) Caleb Ewan	09:36
7	(England) Sam Lowe	09:39
8	(Canada) Charles Matte	09:43
9	(Canada) Simon-Pierre Gauthier	09:44
10	(Northern Ireland) Matthew Adair	09:51
11	(Scotland) Grant Ferguson	09:51
12	(England) Matthew Holmes	09:53
13	(South Africa) James Fourie	09:54
14	(Isle of Man) Warwick Sanderson	10:01
15	(Canada) Elliott Doyle	10:02
16	(Northern Ireland) Daniel Stewart	10:03
17	(Barbados) Russell Elcock	10:05
18	(Bermuda) Dominique Mayho	10:07
19	(Namibia) Till Drobisch	10:09
20	(Guernsey) Alex Wilson	10:10
21	(Wales) Dan Pearson	10:14
22	(Scotland) Stuart McCluskey	10:19
23	(South Africa) Jayde Julius	10:21
24	(Isle of Man) Jonathan Cregeen	10:23
25	(Scotland) Jack Barrett	10:26
26	(Isle of Man) Thomas Mazzone	10:28
27	(Canada) David Onsow	10:37
28	(Malaysia) Hamdan Hamidun	10:37
29	(Anguilla) Elroy Laud	10:37
30	(Isle of Man) Alexander Haddock	10:41
31	(Bermuda) Tre'Shun Correia	10:42
32	(Barbados) Brandon Wilkie	10:45
33	(Malaysia) Muhd arfy qhairant Amran	10:54
34	(Belize) Joel Borland	10:28
35	(Gibraltar) Frank Warwick	11:08
36	(Scotland) Taylor Johnstone	11:20
37	(India) Abhinandan Bhosale	11:24
38	(South Africa) Emile Jacobs	11:32
39	(Belize) Juan Mauricio Umana	11:33
40	(Anguilla) Deion Richardson	11:58
41	(Uganda) Lawrence Kyagulanyi	13:00
42	(British Virgin Islands) Shaquil Samuel	13:14
43	(Uganda) Richard Kiyegga	13:40
44	(Kenya) John Erot Emekwi	13:53
–	(Cyprus) Christos Loizou	DNF
