= Owain Doull =

British road cyclist

Owain Doull MBE
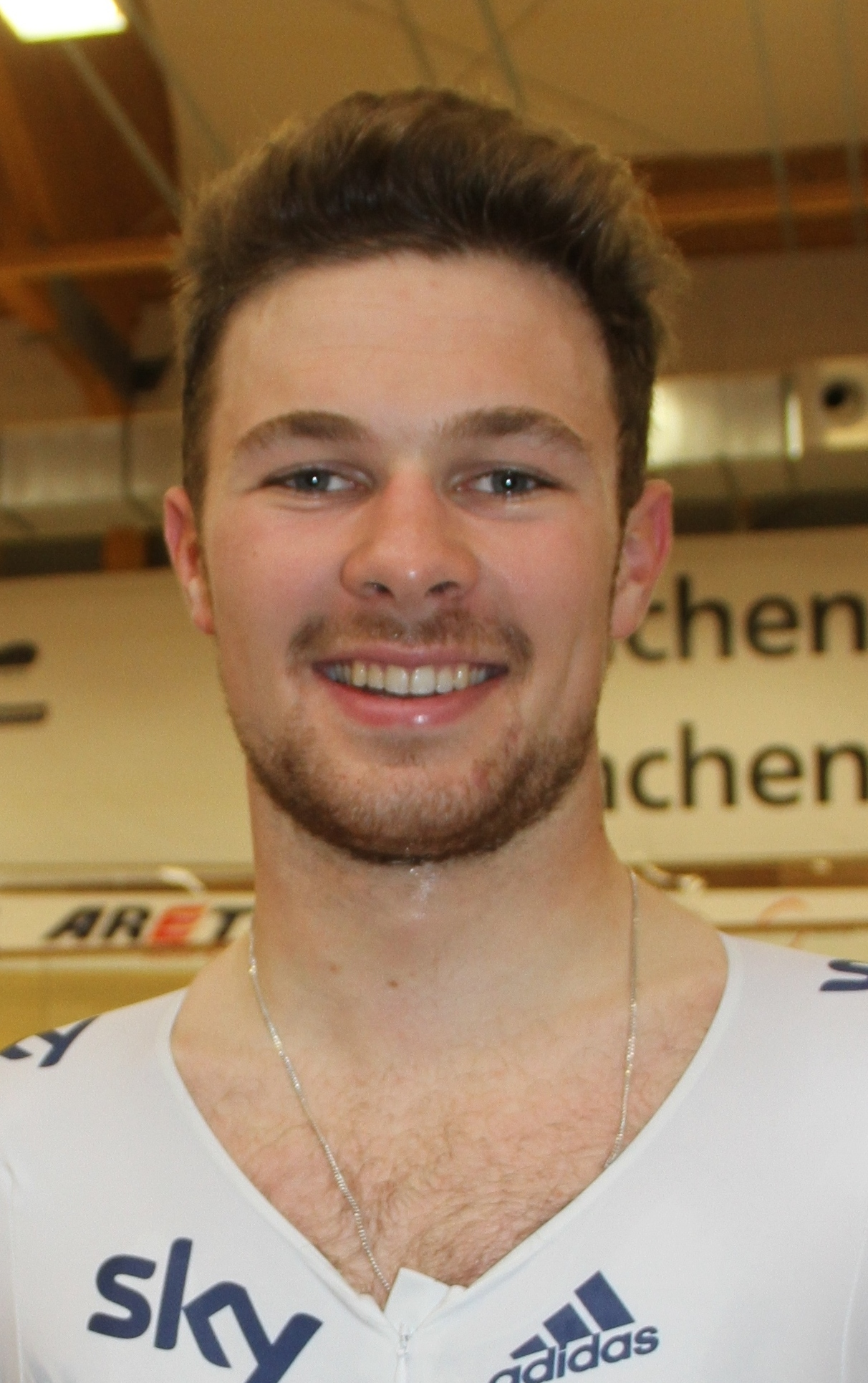
- Doull in 2015

Personal information
- Full name: Owain Daniel Doull
- Born: May 2, 1993 (age 33) Cardiff, Wales
- Height: 1.81 m (5 ft 11 1/2 in)
- Weight: 71 kg (157 lb; 11 st 3 lb)

Cycling career
- Sport: Cycling
- Current team: EF Education–EasyPost
- Disciplines: Track; Road
- Role: Rider
- Rider type: Endurance

Amateur team
- 2013: 100% Me

Professional teams
- 2014: An Post–Chain Reaction
- 2015–2016: WIGGINS
- 2016: → Team Sky (stagiaire)
- 2017–2021: Team Sky
- 2022–2026: EF Education–EasyPost
- 2026-: Visma–Lease a Bike

Major wins
- Track Olympic Games Team pursuit (2016)
Medal record
Representing Great Britain
Olympic Games
Gold medal – first place	2016 Rio de Janeiro	Team pursuit
World Championships
Silver medal – second place	2015 Yvelines	Team pursuit
Silver medal – second place	2016 London	Team pursuit
European Championships
Gold medal – first place	2013 Apeldoorn	Team pursuit
Gold medal – first place	2014 Baie-Mahault	Team pursuit
Gold medal – first place	2015 Grenchen	Team pursuit

Owain Daniel Doull (born 2 May 1993) is a Welsh road and track cyclist, who currently rides for UCI WorldTeam Visma–Lease a Bike. Doull specialises in the team pursuit on the track, and won a gold medal in the discipline at the 2016 Olympics in Rio de Janeiro; as a result, he became the first Welsh-speaking athlete to win Olympic gold.

== Career history ==
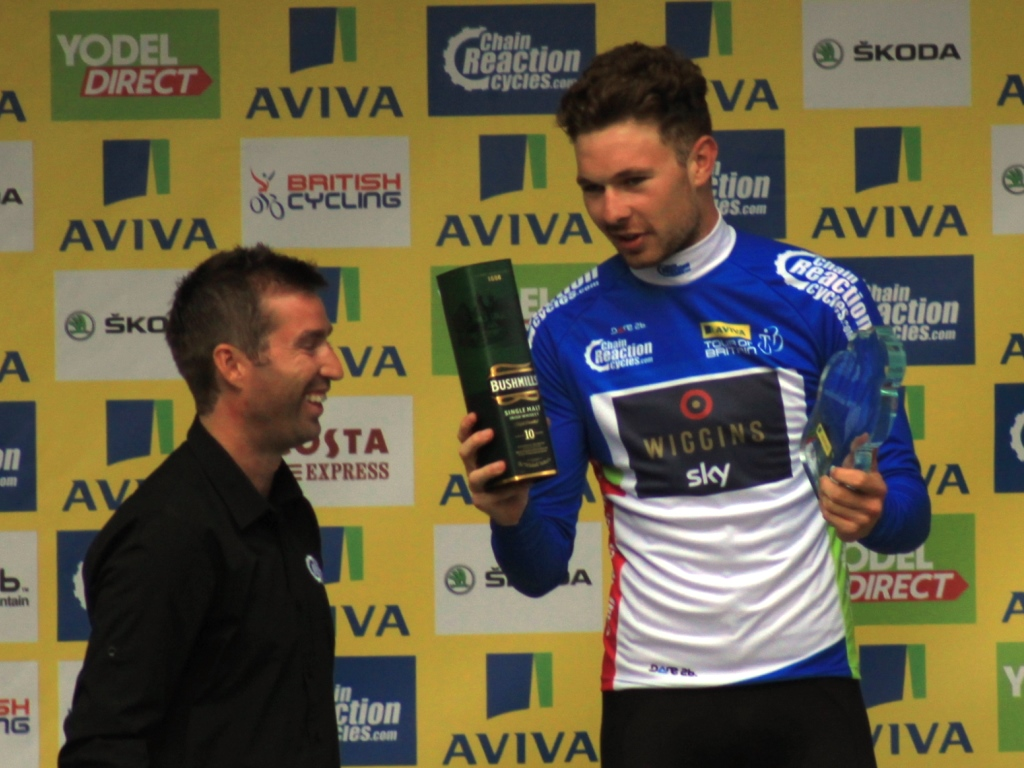
Doull at the 2015 Tour of Britain, where he finished third overall and won the Points Classification

Doull was born and raised in Cardiff, Wales where he was educated at Ysgol y Wern and Ysgol Gyfun Gymraeg Glantaf. As a child he was a keen sportsperson and played rugby as a schoolboy and started cycling for the Maindy Flyers at 14.

In 2010 he was selected for the 2011 British Cycling's Olympic Development Programme, along with fellow Welsh cyclists Amy Roberts and Elinor Barker. Roberts and Barker were also part of the Wales team that entered the 2011 Commonwealth Youth Games on the Isle of Man. Doull took two medals at the games, the silver in the Men's road race and bronze alongside Dan Pearson in the Men's team road race. In 2012 Doull completed the Olympic Development Programme and was accepted into the British Cycling Academy Programme.

Doull's first competitive tournament for Great Britain was at the 2013 UCI Track Cycling World Championships in Minsk, where he finished fifth in the Scratch race. His first podium finish was at the 2013 UEC European Track Championships in Apeldoorn, where as part of the team pursuit, he took gold along with Steven Burke, Ed Clancy and Andy Tennant.

Doull followed his European victory with success on the world stage when he was part of the team pursuit team to take gold at Manchester in the first leg of the 2013–14 UCI Track Cycling World Cup. Then in December 2013 he won two further medals in the second leg of the World Cup, this time in Aguascalientes, Mexico. He was again part of the team pursuit which took the bronze medal, and then won his first major individual medal when he took gold in the scratch race.

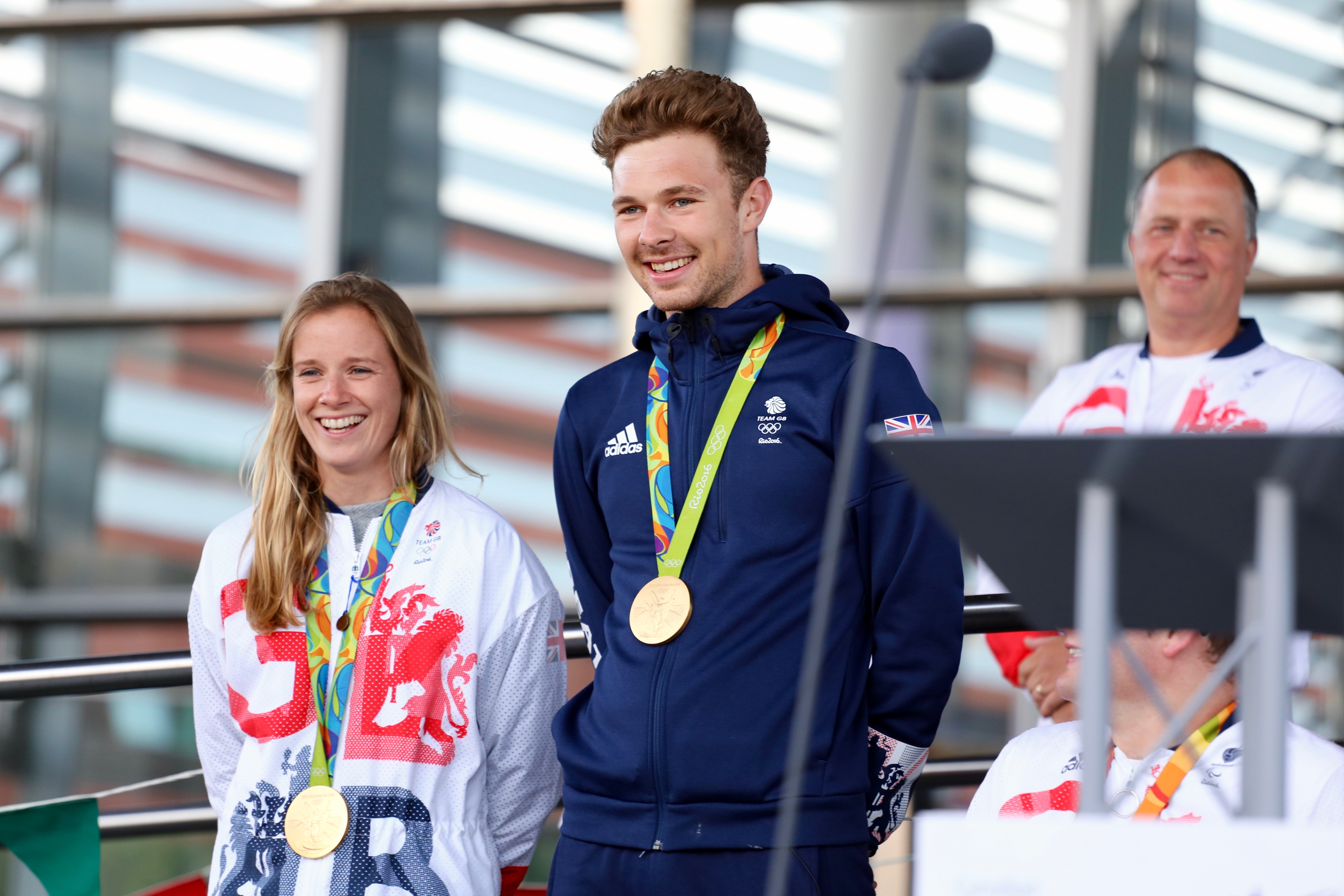
Doull (right) with his Olympic gold medal in 2016

Doull turned professional for the 2014 road season with An Post–Chain Reaction. Doull represented Wales at the Commonwealth Games in Glasgow, 2014.

In 2015 Doull moved to the new WIGGINS team set up by Bradley Wiggins aiming to prepare British riders for the team pursuit at the 2016 Summer Olympics, rejecting an offer to switch to road racing full-time with Team Europcar. In September 2015, Doull finished third overall at the Tour of Britain, and also won the points classification. In November 2015 Doull confirmed that he would remain at WIGGINS for the 2016 season, whilst in May 2016 it was announced that he would join Team Sky on a two-year deal from 2017. In August 2016, Doull signed on with Team Sky as a stagiaire for the remainder of the season.

Doull was appointed Member of the Order of the British Empire (MBE) in the 2017 New Year Honours for services to cycling. Doull kicked off his 2018 season with an appearance in the Tour Down Under.

In August 2019, he was named in the startlist for the 2019 Vuelta a España.

== Major results ==
=== Road ===
2010
1st Points classification, Junior Tour of Wales
2nd Road race, National Junior Championships
2011
Commonwealth Youth Games

2nd Road race
3rd Team road race
4th Time trial

2013
1st Points classification, An Post Rás
2nd Road race, National Under-23 Championships
4th ZLM Tour
2014
1st Overall Le Triptyque des Monts et Châteaux

1st Stage 3

2nd Time trial, National Under-23 Championships
4th Ronde van Vlaanderen Beloften
2015
National Under-23 Championships

1st Road race
2nd Time trial

Flèche du Sud

1st Points classification
1st Stages 3 & 4

2nd Overall Le Triptyque des Monts et Châteaux

1st Points classification

2nd La Côte Picarde
3rd Overall Tour of Britain

1st Points classification

5th Time trial, UCI World Under-23 Championships
7th Overall ZLM Tour
10th Overall Tour de Normandie
10th Ronde van Vlaanderen Beloften
2017
3rd Team time trial, UCI World Championships
7th Overall Tour du Poitou-Charentes
9th Overall Tour of Britain
2018
3rd Road race, National Championships
2019 (1 pro win)
1st Stage 3 Herald Sun Tour
2nd Kuurne–Brussels–Kuurne
4th Time trial, National Championships
9th Cadel Evans Great Ocean Road Race
2020 (1)
1st Stage 4 Tour de la Provence
2021
1st Stage 3 (TTT) Tour of Britain
2022
7th Time trial, Commonwealth Games
2023
4th Road race, National Championships
10th Trofeo Palma
2024
5th Road race, National Championships

==== Grand Tour general classification results timeline ====
Grand Tour	2019	2020	2021	2022	2023	2024	2025
Giro d'Italia	—	—	—	DNF	—	—	110
Tour de France	—	—	—	90	—	—	—
Vuelta a España	70	—	—	—	—	118	—

Legend
—	Did not compete
DNF	Did not finish

=== Track ===
2010
National Junior Championships

1st Points race
2nd Madison
3rd Individual pursuit

2011
UEC European Junior Championships

1st Team pursuit
2nd Individual pursuit
3rd Omnium

1st Team pursuit, National Championships
National Junior Championships

1st Madison (with Jonathan Dibben)
1st Points race
2nd Individual pursuit
2nd Scratch

1st Six Days of Ghent Future Stars (with Simon Yates)
2012
National Championships

1st Individual pursuit
1st Team pursuit
2nd Points race
3rd Madison (with George Atkins)

2013
1st Team pursuit, UEC European Championships
UCI World Cup

1st Team pursuit, Manchester
1st Scratch, Aguascalientes
3rd Team pursuit, Aguascalientes

2014
1st Team pursuit, UEC European Championships
UCI World Cup, London

1st Madison (with Mark Christian)
1st Team pursuit

2015
1st Team pursuit, UEC European Championships
2nd Team pursuit, UCI World Championships
2016
1st Team pursuit, Olympic Games
2nd Team pursuit, UCI World Championships
2019
2nd Six Days of London (with Mark Cavendish)
