= Dibben =

Dibben is a surname. Notable people with the surname include:

- David Dibben (born 1958), Caymanian cyclist
- Jonathan Dibben (born 1994), British cyclist
- Peter Dibben (born 1991), British track cyclist
