= 2013 British National Track Championships =

- Venue: Manchester, England
- Date(s): 25–29 September 2013
- Velodrome: Manchester Velodrome

The 2013 British National Track Championships were a series of track cycling competitions held from 25 to 29 September 2013, at the Manchester Velodrome. They were organised and sanctioned by British Cycling, and were open to British cyclists.

== Competition ==
Separate competitions were held for both men and women, and certain events were also included for paracyclists and juniors. No events were held in Women's Omnium or Men's Madison; otherwise the men's and women's programme was broadly identical, and matched the programme of the UCI World Track Cycling Championships, with the addition of a women's madison race. The women's team pursuit was held over 4000m for four cyclists for the first time following modifications to the event.

Open to British cyclists, the winners of each event are entitled to wear the national champion's jersey - a white jersey with a red, white and blue front stripe - for the next year when competing in that discipline.

The 2013 event was dominated by established Olympic cyclists, the most successful of which was Double Olympic champion Laura Trott, winning four titles (two in team events) and a silver medal; only a surprise win in the scratch race for Corrine Hall prevented a clean sweep of 5 endurance titles. Jessica Varnish did complete a sprint sweep of 4 titles, including the team sprint with Dannielle Khan. Trott, with Danielle King, Joanna Rowsell and Elinor Barker also set a new world record on the way to achieving the gold medal in the recently revised women's team pursuit. The previous world record, over a shorter distance and for three riders, is also held by Trott, Rowsell and King.

The medals were more evenly distributed among the men, as several endurance events went uncontested by established talent, and so provided opportunities for up and coming riders. Jason Kenny won three, and Kian Emadi won two, of the sprint disciplines, while Matthew Crampton won a medal in all four, including gold in the team sprint with Emadi and Kenny.

Also noteworthy was the unusual double almost achieved by Ed Clancy, winning gold in the individual pursuit, and silver in the Kilo, normally considered a time trial for sprint athletes only. Clancy also won gold in the points race and silver in the scratch, but did not contest the team pursuit, in which discipline he was reigning Olympic champion. Other noteworthy performances included several medal rides in sprint disciplines by converted heptathlete Katy Marchant in her first major event. Although double World champion Becky James did not compete, her sister Rachel did attend, winning a pair of medals.

== Medal summary ==
=== Men's Events ===
Event	Gold		Silver		Bronze	
Men's Events
Kilo	Kian Emadi; Tunstall Wheelers CC	1.01.702	Ed Clancy; Rapha Condor	1.02.189	Matthew Crampton; BCUM	1.02.636
Sprint	Jason Kenny; Sky Track Cycling		Peter Mitchell; Performance Cycle Coaching		Matthew Crampton; BCUM	
Keirin	Jason Kenny; Sky Track Cycling		Matthew Crampton; BCUM		Lewis Oliva; USN	
Team sprint	Matthew Crampton; Kian Emadi; Jason Kenny		Philip Hindes; Matt Rotherham; Callum Skinner		Jonathan Biggin; John Paul; Bruce Croall	
Individual Pursuit	Ed Clancy; Rapha Condor	4.26.015	Steven Burke; Node4 - Giordana	4.27.408	Joe Kelly; 100% Me	catch made
Team pursuit	Adam Duggleby; Timothy Lawson; Jacob Ragan; Alistair Rutherford; Wheelbase AlturaMGD	4.23.188	Andrew Hastings; John McClelland; Alex Minting; Kristian Woolf; Prestige VC	4.27.691	Ben Elliott; Jack Green; Barney Storey; Alex Wise; VC St Raphael	4.27.001
Points race	Ed Clancy; Rapha Condor	59	Sam Harrison; 100% Me	57	Jacob Ragan; Wheelbase Altura	51
Scratch race	Sam Harrison; 100% Me		Ed Clancy; Rapha Condor		Steven Burke; Node4 - Giordana	
Omnium	Jon Mould; USN		Christopher Latham; 100% Me		Christopher Lawless; Kuota-Spinergy-GSG	

=== Women's Events ===
Event	Gold		Silver		Bronze	
Women's Events
500m time trial	Jessica Varnish; Team C-Sprint Racing	34.445	Victoria Williamson; Victoria VC Norwich	34.913	Dannielle Khan; Solihull CC	35.345
Sprint	Jessica Varnish; Team V-Sprint Racing	2-0	Victoria Williamson; Victoria VC Norwich		Katy Marchant; BCUM	2-0 *
Keirin	Jessica Varnish; Team V-Sprint Racing		Katy Marchant; BCUM		Rachel James; Abergavenny RC	
Team sprint	Dannielle Khan; Jessica Varnish rep. West Midlands	33.852	Katy Marchant; Victoria Williamson rep. Eastern		Ellie Coster; Rachel James rep. Wales	
Individual Pursuit	Laura Trott; Wiggle Honda	3:34.973	Danielle King; Wiggle Honda	3:42.355	Katie Archibald; City of Edinburgh RC	3:42.008*
Team pursuit	Laura Trott; Joanna Rowsell; Danielle King; Elinor Barker; Great Britain/ Wiggle Honda	4:32.721 WR, EUR	Eleanor Jones; Madelaine Moore; Adel Tyson-Bloor; Rachel Murray; VC St Raphael	5:12.242	Only two medals awarded	
Points race	Laura Trott; Wiggle Honda	28	Danielle King; Wiggle Honda	19	Elinor Barker; Wiggle Honda	
Scratch race	Corrine Hall; Matrix Fitness R A		Laura Trott; Wiggle Honda		Danielle King; Wiggle Honda	
Madison	Laura Trott; Danielle King; Wiggle Honda		Katie Archibald; Charline Joiner; Scratch team		Hayley Jones; Emily Kay; Scratch team	

- in bronze medal final ride off

WR = World REcord; EUR = European Record

=== Para-cycling Events ===
A series of para-cycling national championships were also held over combined categories using a points system. Tandem events were held for blind and visually impaired cyclists which other categories were put together in weighted mixed events.

Event	Gold		Silver		Bronze	
Para-cycling Events
BVI Mixed Gender 1000m	Sophie Thornhill; Helen Scott	99.351 pts AT : 1:09.714; TT : 1.08.714	Neil Fachie; Peter Mitchell	98.179 pts AT : 1:02.489; TT : 1.01.351	Aileen McGlynn; Lauryn Therin	97.919pts AT : 1:10.174; TT : 1:08.714
C1-5 Mixed Gender Sprint Time Trial	Jon-Allan Butterworth; Cat : MC5	100.338 pts AT : 1.05.725 (1 km); TT : 1:05.947	Shaun McKeown; Cat : MC3	94.438 pts AT : 1:12.712 (1 km); TT : 1:08.668	Crystal Lane; Cat : FC5	92.288 pts AT : 39.793 (500m); TT : 36.724
BVI Mixed Gender 200m flying lap	Sophie Thornhill; Helen Scott	101.578 pts AT : 11.278; TT : 11.456	Neil Fachie; Peter Mitchell	99.054 pts AT : 10.146; TT : 10.050	Aileen McGlynn; Lauryn Therin	97.823pts AT : 11.711; TT : 11.456
C1-5 Mixed Gender 200m flying lap	Crystal Lane; Cat : FC5	101.302 pts AT : 12.753; TT : 12.919	Mazyar Ossamisaeed; Cat : MC2	100.924 pts AT : 14.615; TT : 14.750	Jaco van Gass; Cat : MC3	93.174 pts AT : 13.448; TT : 12.530

AT = Actual Time TT = Target or reference time

=== Under 16 Madison Events ===
The British Under 16 Madison championships were also held as part of the competition.

Event	Gold		Silver		Bronze	
Madison Events - Under 16
Boys' Madison	Joseph Fry; Joey Walker	17 pts	Tom England; Tom Rotherham	9pts	Matthew Walls; Reece Wood	7 pts
Girls' Madison	Megan Barker; Jessica Roberts	15 pts (+1 lap)	Eleanor Dickinson; Elizabeth Holden	8 pts	Abigail Dentus; Lucy Shaw	8 pts
