= Cycling at the 2010 Commonwealth Games – Women's team sprint =

The women's team sprint at the 2010 Commonwealth Games took place on 6 October 2010 at the Indira Gandhi Arena.

== Qualification ==
Rank	Country	Cyclists	Result
1	Australia	Kaarle McCulloch; Anna Meares	34.115
2	Scotland	Jenny Davis; Charline Joiner	36.057
3	Canada	Monique Sullivan; Tara Whitten	36.481
4	India	Rameshwori Devi; Rejani Wijaya Kumari	38.339

== Finals ==
Final

Rank	Name	Time
1st place, gold medalist(s)	Australia	33.811
2nd place, silver medalist(s)	Scotland	35.908

Bronze medal match

Rank	Name	Time
3rd place, bronze medalist(s)	Canada	37.094
4	India	38.344
