= Matt Illingworth =

English cyclist (born 1968)

Personal information
- Full name: Matthew Illingworth
- Born: 25 July 1968 (age 58) Westcliff, Essex, England

Cycling career
- Sport: Cycling
- Disciplines: Track & Road
- Role: Rider

Amateur teams
- 1991: Leo RC
- 1992: GS Strada - M&M Conservatories
- 1993-1994: North Wirral Velo-Kodak
- 1995: Team Clean
- 1998: Team Brite
- 1999: Linda McCartney Foods
- 2000: DuPont

Professional teams
- 1998: –
- 2006–2007: –
- 2008: –
Medal record
Men's track cycling
Representing England
Commonwealth Games
Silver medal – second place	1994 Victoria	Team Pursuit
Silver medal – second place	1998 Kuala Lumpur	Team Pursuit
Bronze medal – third place	1998 Kuala Lumpur	Pursuit

Matt Illingworth (born 25 July 1968)) is a road and track racing cyclist, in individual and team pursuits and time-trials track and road. He rode for England in the team time-trial at the 1994 Commonwealth Games, coming second. He was a member of the silver-medal pursuit team and won bronze in the individual pursuit at the 1998 Commonwealth Games. He also rode at the 1992 Summer Olympics and the 1996 Summer Olympics.

He broke the 10-mile record in 1992 and the 30-mile in 1998.

== Palmarès ==
=== Track ===
1993
1st British National Team Pursuit Championships

1994
1st British National Team Pursuit Championships

1996
1st British National Team Pursuit Championships
3rd World Cup, Germany, Team Pursuit, (with Hayles, Newton & Steel)
3rd World Cup, Italy, Team Pursuit, (with Wallace, Newton & Steel)

1997
1st British National Team Pursuit Championships
3rd World Cup, Greece, Team Pursuit (with Clay, Steel & West)

1998
1st British National Team Pursuit Championships
2nd Team Pursuit, Commonwealth Games (with Clay, Hayles & Sturgess)
2nd British National Individual Pursuit Championships
3rd Individual Pursuit, Commonwealth Games

1999
1st British National Team Pursuit Championships
2nd British National Individual Pursuit Championships

=== Road ===
1992
1st Stage 2, Premier Calendar, Girvan 3 day
3rd Overall Tour of Normandy
1994
2nd Team time trial, Commonwealth Games

1998
3rd Premier Calendar series

1st Premier Calendar, Silver Spoon 2 day

1st Stage 1, Silver Spoon
2nd Stage 2, Silver Spoon

1st Stage 3, Premier Calendar, Girvan 3 day
1st Stage 4, Premier Calendar, Girvan 3 day

1999
1st CTT National Time Trial Championships - 10 miles
2nd Premier Calendar, Silver Spoon 2 day

2nd Stage 1, Silver Spoon
3rd Stage 3, Silver Spoon

2000
2nd CTT National Time Trial Championships - 50 miles
3rd CTT National Time Trial Championships - 10 miles

1st Stage 2 Tour of Majorca 2nd Overall Tour of Majorca
