= George Atkins (cyclist) =

British racing cyclist

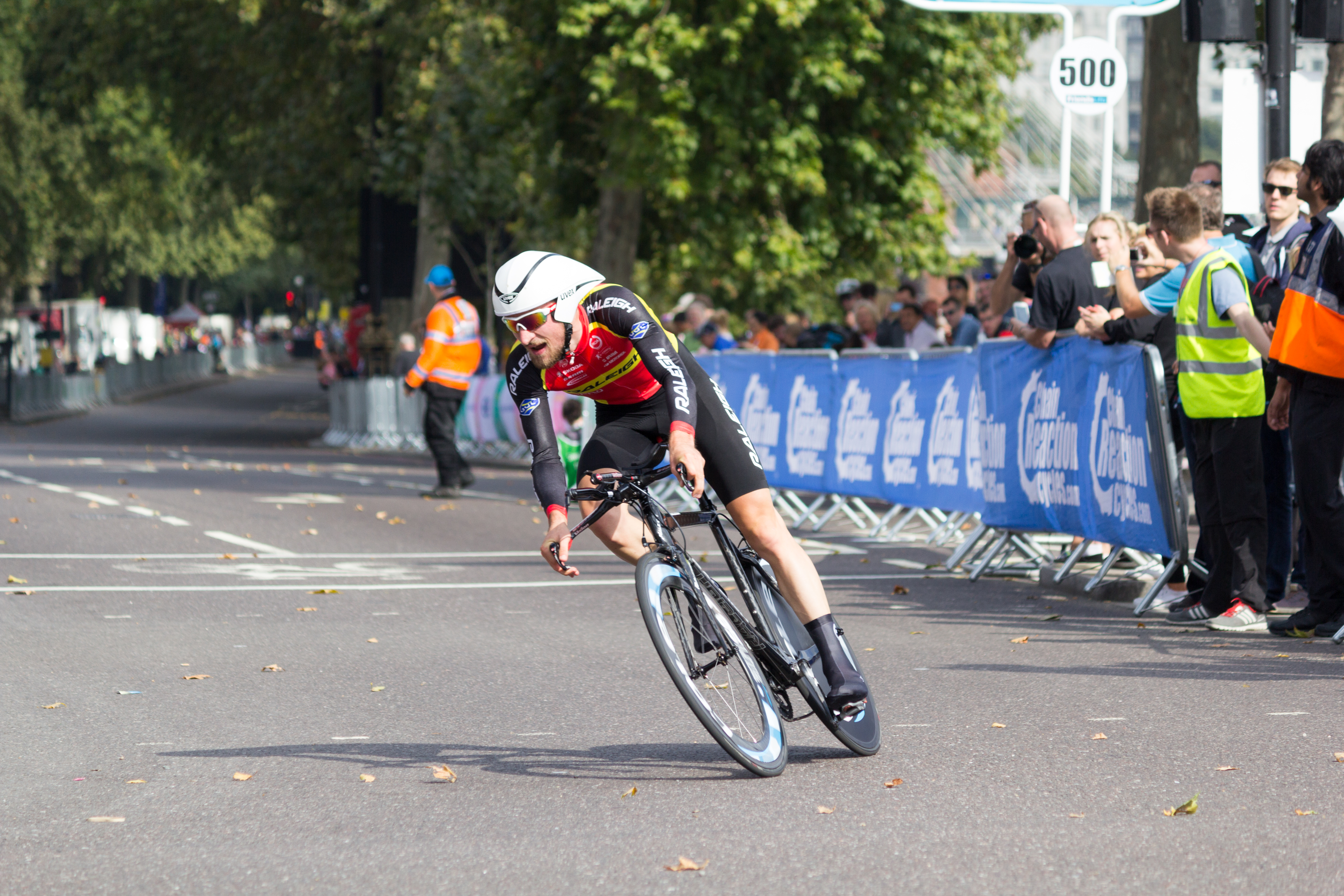
- Atkins at the 2014 Tour of Britain

Personal information
- Full name: George Richard Atkins
- Born: 18 August 1991 (age 35) Leicester, England

Cycling career
- Sport: Cycling
- Current team: Retired
- Disciplines: Road; Track
- Role: Rider
- Rider type: Endurance

Amateur teams
- 2008: Pearl Izumi/Planet X/High 5
- 2009: Websters Cycles
- 2010: 100% ME
- 2011: Velo Ecosse/Montpeliers
- 2012–2013: 100% ME

Professional teams
- 2014: Team Raleigh
- 2015: ONE Pro Cycling
- 2016: JLT–Condor

George Richard Atkins (born 18 August 1991) is a British former track and road racing cyclist, who rode professionally between 2014 and 2016. He was a member of British Cycling's Olympic Development Programme. In 2009 he won the junior race at the British National Road Race Championships. At the 2010 Commonwealth Games he won the silver medal in the track points race. After the Commonwealth Games Atkins took a break from the sport but returned in the summer of 2011.

It was announced in October 2013 that Atkins would turn professional for the 2014 season, with Team Raleigh. After one season with Raleigh Atkins was listed as part of the inaugural squad of the ONE Pro Cycling team for the 2015 season.

== Major results ==
2007
1st Criterium, European Youth Summer Olympic Festival
3rd Individual pursuit, National Youth Track Championships
2008
3rd Scratch, National Junior Track Championships
2009
1st Road race, National Junior Road Championships
National Junior Track Championships

1st Madison (with Dan McLay)
1st Individual pursuit
2nd Points race
2nd Scratch
3rd Kilo

UEC European Under-23 Track Championships

2nd Team pursuit
3rd Individual pursuit

2010
National Track Championships

1st Points race
2nd Individual pursuit
3rd Madison (with Erick Rowsell)

2nd Points race, Commonwealth Games
2011
1st Scottish National Hill Climb Championships
1st Drummond Trophy
2nd Time trial, National Under-23 Road Championships
3rd Time trial, Scottish National Road Championship
2012
National Track Championships

1st Points race
1st Team pursuit (with Team 100% ME)
3rd Omnium
3rd Madison (with Owain Doull)

1st Jock Wadley Memorial
2nd Time trial, National Under-23 Road Championships
2013
National Track Championships

1st Madison (with Jon Mould)
3rd Points race

1st Overall British Cycling Elite Circuit Series

1st Stockton Festival of Cycling Criterium

3rd Time trial, National Under-23 Road Championships
2014
1st Stockton Festival of Cycling Criterium
1st David Campbell Memorial Road Race
2nd Wales Open Criterium
2nd Leicester Castle Classic
2015
3rd National Circuit Race Championships
3rd Leicester Castle Classic
3rd Betty Pharoah Memorial Legstretchers Road Race
