= 2017 British National Track Championships =

Cycling Competition

- Venue: Manchester, England
- Date: 27–29 January 2017
- Velodrome: Manchester Velodrome

The 2017 British National Track Championships were a series of track cycling competitions held from 27–29 January 2017 at the Manchester Velodrome. They are organised and sanctioned by British Cycling, and were open to British cyclists. The championships were sponsored by HSBC.

== Medal summary ==
=== Men's Events ===
Event	Gold	Silver	Bronze
1 Km Time Trial	Daniel Bigham	Thomas Rotherham	Jonathan Mitchell
Sprint	Ryan Owens	Joseph Truman	Lewis Oliva
Keirin	Lewis Oliva	Matt Rotherham	Thomas Rotherham
Team sprint	Jack Carlin; Ryan Owens; Joseph Truman	Joel Partington; Thomas Rotherham; Matt Rotherham	Ryan Hutchinson; Alex Jolliffe; Lewis Oliva
Individual Pursuit	Daniel Bigham	Charlie Tanfield	Ethan Hayter
Team pursuit	Daniel Bigham; Charlie Tanfield; Jacob Tipper; Jonathan Wale	Matthew Bostock; Ethan Hayter; Joe Holt; Matthew Walls	Andy Brown; Angus Claxton; Joseph Nally; Evan Oliphant
Points	Joseph Nally	Ethan Hayter	Zachery May
Scratch	Ethan Hayter	Frank Longstaff	Zachery May

=== Women's Events ===
Event	Gold	Silver	Bronze
500m time trial	Dannielle Khan	Rachel James	Jessica Crampton
Sprint	Jessica Crampton	Rachel James	Sophie Capewell
Keirin	Sophie Capewell	Katie Archibald	Neah Evans
Team sprint	Lauren Bate; Sophie Capewell	Emma Baird; Lucy Grant	Georgia Hilleard; Esme Niblett
Individual Pursuit	Katie Archibald	Emily Nelson	Neah Evans
Team pursuit	Eleanor Dickinson; Manon Lloyd; Emily Nelson; Annasley Park	Lauren Dolan; Pfeiffer Georgi; Jessica Roberts; Emily Tillett	Neah Evans; Dannielle Khan; Katie Prankerd; Sarah Storey
Points	Katie Archibald	Emily Nelson	Neah Evans
Scratch	Katie Archibald	Neah Evans	Elinor Barker
