= Anna Docherty =

British cyclist

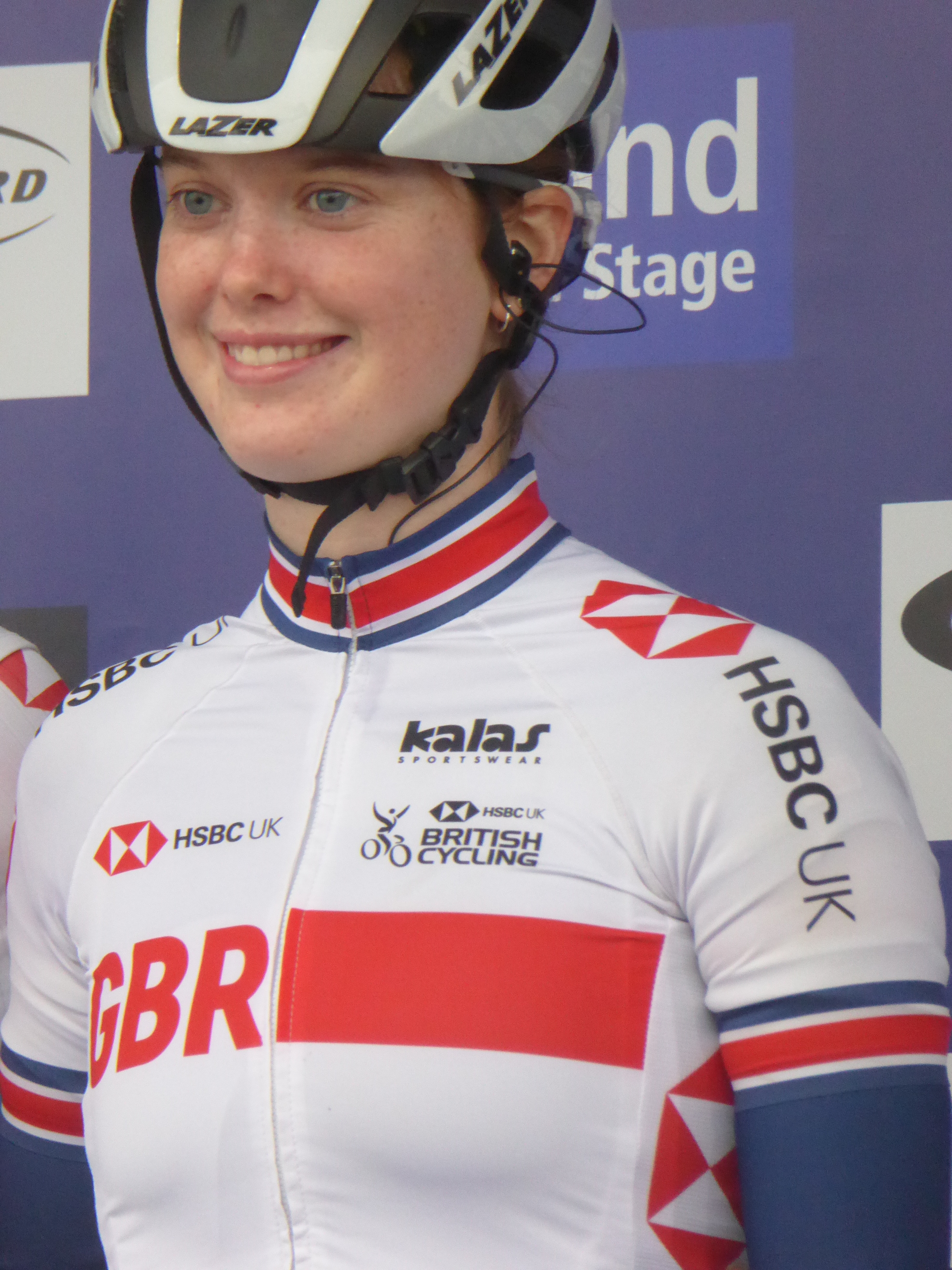
- Docherty at the 2019 Women's Tour of Scotland

Personal information
- Born: 20 July 2000 (age 26) York
- Height: 174 cm (5 ft 9 in)

Cycling career
- Sport: Cycling
- Disciplines: Track; Road
- Role: Rider
- Rider type: Pursuitist (track)

Amateur teams
- 2012–2015: Clifton CC
- 2016–2018: Liv Cycling Club–Halo Films
- 2019–2020: Team Breeze
- 2021: Isorex No-Aqua Ladies Cycling Team

Anna Docherty (born 20 July 2000) is a British track and road cyclist, who most recently rode for Belgian amateur team Isorex No-Aqua Ladies Cycling Team.

== Cycling career ==
Docherty became a four-time British champion after winning the Team Pursuit Championship at the 2020 British National Track Championships. She had previously won the British National Madison Championships in 2017 and 2019, and also won the team pursuit at the 2019 British National Track Championships. Docherty represented Team GB in June 2019 at the European Games in Minsk.
