= Peter Dibben =

British cyclist (born 1991)

Personal information
- Born: 27 May 1991 (age 35)

Cycling career
- Sport: Cycling
- Current team: Retired
- Discipline: Track cycling
- Role: Rider
- Rider type: Pursuit

Peter Dibben (born 1991) is a British track cyclist.

His younger brother Jonathan Dibben rides for UCI WorldTeam Lotto–Intermarché.

== Cycling career ==
Dibben became a British team champion when winning the Team Pursuit Championship at the 2011 British National Track Championships.
