= Simon Wilson (cyclist) =

British cyclist (born 1980)

Personal information
- Full name: Simon Wilson
- Born: 1 August 1980 (age 46)

Cycling career
- Sport: Cycling

Amateur teams
- 1998–2000: Worcester St Johns CC
- 2005: Worcester St Johns CC
- 2007–2008: Arctic Aircon RT
- 2009: Vieri Velo RC
- 2010–2011: MG–Maxifuel
- 2012: SportGrub Cycling Team
- 2013: Team Corley Cycles
- 2014: Wheelbase CabTech Castelli
- 2015: Polypipe Cycling Team
- 2017: Brother NRG
- 2018: HUUB Ribble Performance Academy
- 2018: Ribble Pro Cycling

Professional team
- 2019–2022: Ribble Pro Cycling

Simon Wilson (born 1 August 1980) is a British track and road racing cyclist, who last rode for UCI Continental team Ribble Weldtite. Wilson won a bronze medal in the team pursuit at the 2011 British National Track Championships and 2018 British National Track Championships.
