= Joe Holt =

Welsh track cyclist

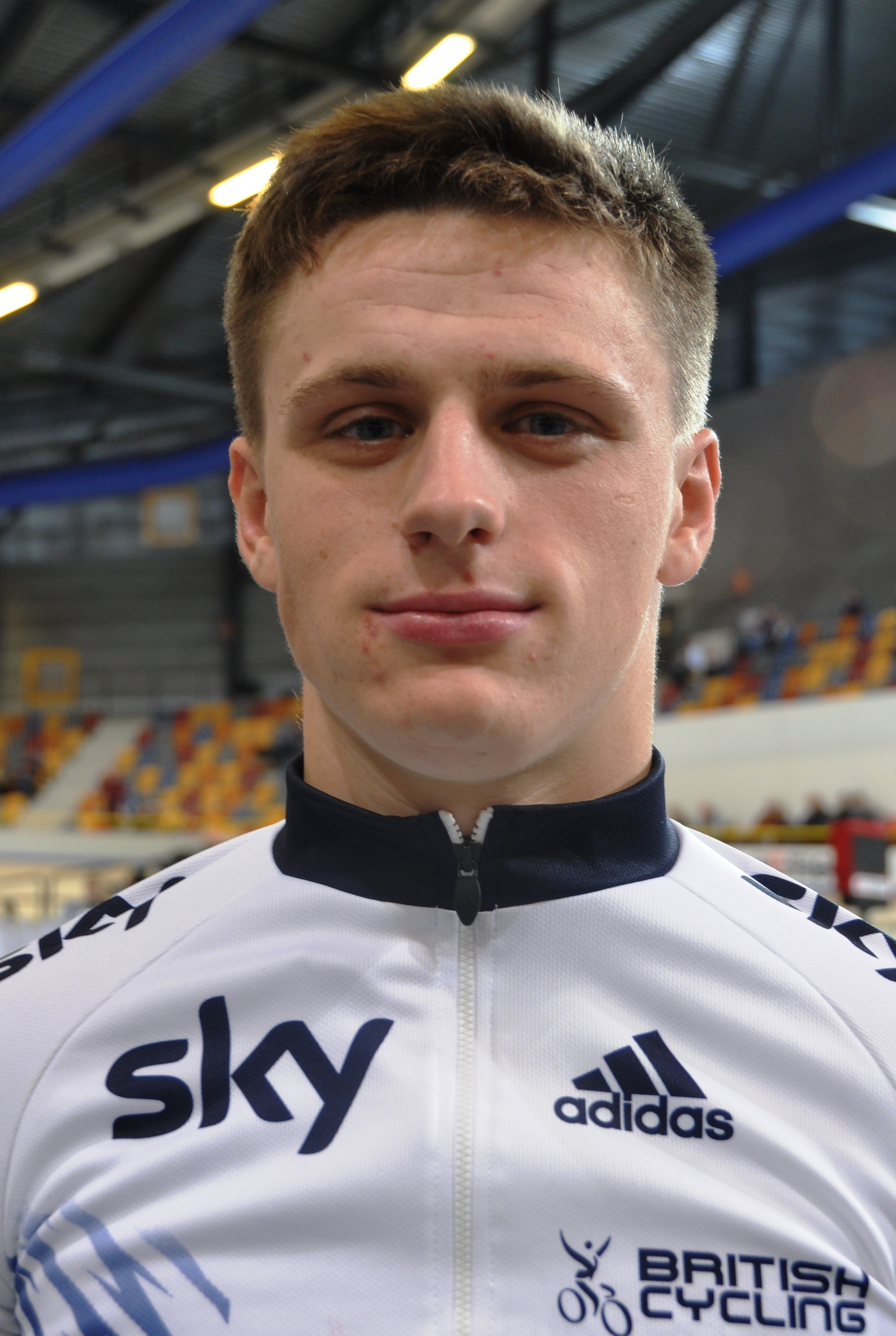
- Holt in 2016

Personal information
- Full name: Joe Steven Holt
- Born: 13 October 1997 (age 29) Swansea, Wales

Cycling career
- Sport: Cycling
- Current team: Tekkerz CC
- Disciplines: Track; Road
- Role: Rider

Amateur teams
- 2007–2008: Clwb Beicio Egni
- 2009–2010: Clwb Beicio Dwyfor Cycling Club
- 2011: Bynea CC
- 2012–2015: County Cycles Racing Team
- 2016–2017: 100% Me
- 2018: Wales Racing Academy
- 2020–: Wales Racing Academy

Professional team
- 2019: Vitus Pro Cycling Team p/b Brother UK

Joe Steven Holt (born 13 October 1997) is a British road and track cyclist from Wales, who currently rides for Tekkerz CC.

== Career ==
At the 2022 British National Track Championships in Newport, Wales he won a British title after winning the team pursuit title.

He switched to Tekkerz CC from the Wales Racing Academy and in 2023 won two more national titles; he won the Time Trial (or Kilo) and the Scratch, at the 2023 British Cycling National Track Championships.

== Major results ==
2014
1st Points classification, Junior Tour of Wales
UEC European Junior Track Championships

2nd Team pursuit
3rd Madison

2nd Madison (with Alex Dowsett), National Track Championships
2015
1st Points classification, Junior Tour of Wales
2016
1st Madison (with Ethan Hayter), National Track Championships
3rd Team pursuit, UEC European Under-23 Track Championships
2017
1st Team pursuit, UEC European Under-23 Track Championships
National Track Championships

2nd Madison (with Jake Stewart)
2nd Team pursuit
2nd Omnium

2018
1st Team pursuit, UEC European Under-23 Track Championships
2022
1st Team pursuit, National Track Championships
2023
1st Kilo & Scratch, National Track Championships
