= Alistair Slater (cyclist) =

British cyclist

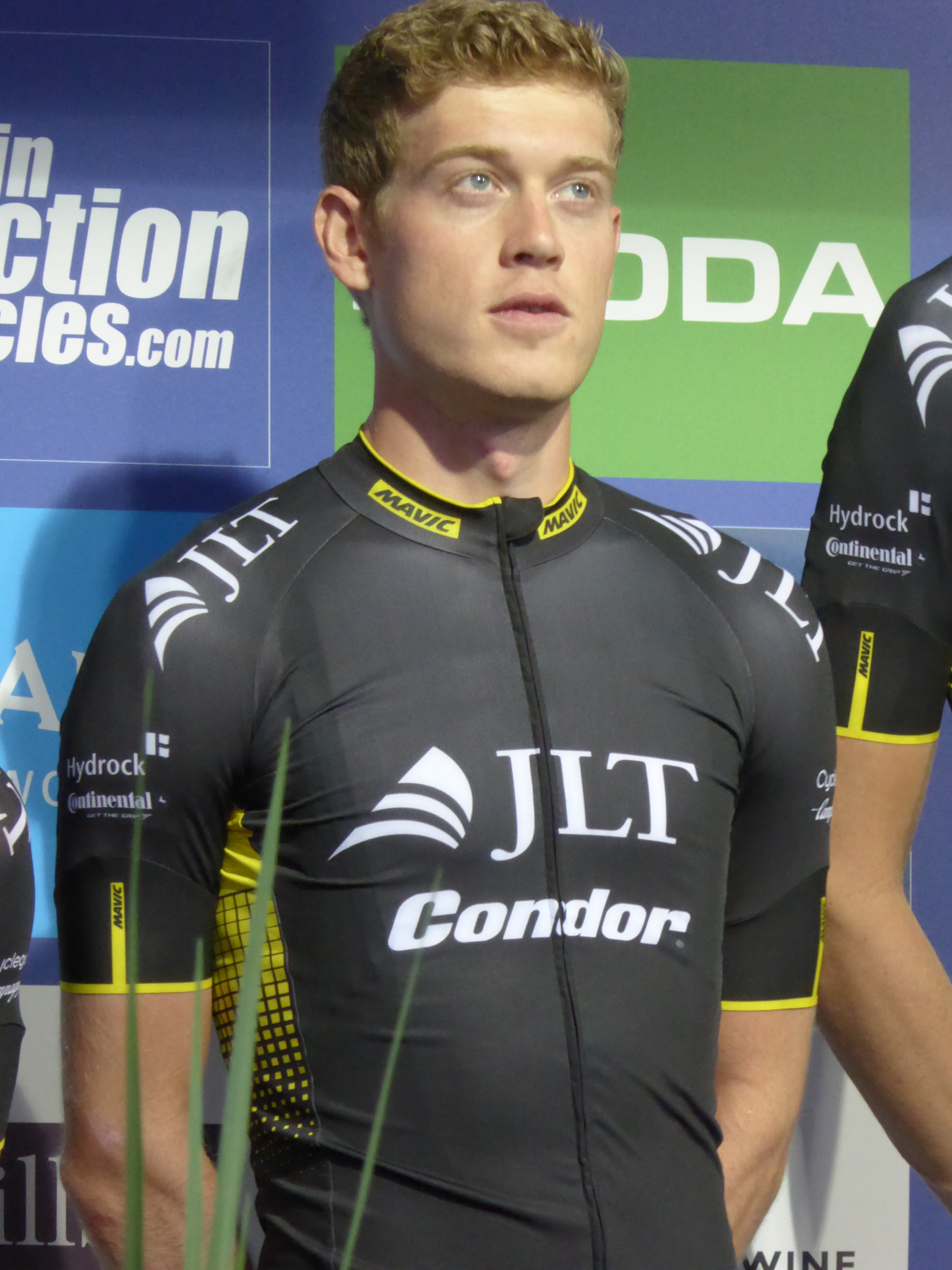
- Slater at the 2016 Tour of Britain

Personal information
- Full name: Alistair Slater
- Born: 11 February 1993 (age 33) Bourne, Lincolnshire, England

Cycling career
- Sport: Cycling
- Current team: Clancy Briggs Cycling Academy
- Disciplines: Track; Road
- Role: Rider
- Rider type: Pursuitist (track)

Amateur teams
- 2012–2013: 100% ME
- 2014: Guidon Chalettois
- 2020–: Clancy Briggs Cycling Academy

Professional teams
- 2015: An Post–Chain Reaction
- 2016–2018: JLT–Condor
- 2019: Vitus Pro Cycling Team p/b Brother UK

Alistair Slater (born 11 February 1993) is a British road and track cyclist, who currently rides for British amateur team Clancy Briggs Cycling Academy.

Slater is a two-time winner of the British National Team Pursuit Championships, winning the event in 2011 and 2012.

Ali is currently a coach for Clancy Briggs Cycling Academy.

== Major results ==
2011
1st Team pursuit, National Track Championships
2012
1st Team pursuit, National Track Championships
5th Time trial, National Road Championships
2017
6th Grand Prix des Marbriers
2018
3rd Lincoln Grand Prix
6th Overall Kreiz Breizh Elites

1st Stage 4
