= Tony Gowland =

English cyclist

Personal information
- Full name: Anthony J Gowland
- Born: 13 May 1945 (age 81) England; United Kingdom

Cycling career
- Sport: Cycling
- Disciplines: Track and Road
- Role: Rider
- Rider type: Six day specialist

Amateur team
- -: Polytechnic CC

Professional teams
- 1968: Falcon
- 1969–1970: Carlton - Truwel
- 1971: TI - Carlton
- 1972–1973: Skol
- 1974–1975: Bantel
- 1976: Skol
- 1977: Midlet - B.S.A.
- 1978: Midlet - Chrysler

Anthony J Gowland, known as Tony Gowland (born 13 May 1945 in Hendon, London) is an English former competitive track cyclist, and a former six-day rider. He was a professional cyclist between 1968 and 1978.

Gowland was a talented track rider as an amateur before turning professional for Carlton, a subsidiary of Raleigh. Turning professional allowed him to ride the London Six, often called the Skol Six, in 1968. He signed his contract, with organiser Ron Webb, in the office of Cycling Weekly in Fleet Street, London. In 1971 he came second in London and won in Montreal, with Gianni Motta of Italy. In 1972 he won the London Six with the Belgian rider, Patrick Sercu.

In 1978 Gowland held a training session at Harlow for riders interested in riding six-day races. They were called the Tony Gowland Master Class and almost all the Harlow club riders turned out.

Gowland lives in Bovingdon, Hertfordshire.

== Palmarès ==
1965
2nd tandem sprint, British National Tandem Sprint Championships, Amateur, (with Ian Alsop)

1966
Amateur 50 mile Madison, Salford Park, gold (with Ian Alsop)

1967
2nd Tandem Sprint, British National Tandem Sprint Championships, Amateur, (with Ian Alsop)
3rd Amateur 50 mile Madison, Herne Hill (with Ian Alsop)

1968
3rd Heage (GBR)
1st Remington (GBR)
10th London, Six Days (GBR); with Piet Van Der Lans

1969
1st Folkestone (GBR)
3rd Rochester (GBR)
6th London, Six Days (GBR); with Piet Van Der Lans

1970
2nd London, Six Days (GBR); with Sigi Renz

1971
3rd British National Stayers Championships, Elite
2nd London, Six Days (GBR); with Alain Van Lancker
1st Montréal, Six Days (CAN); with Gianni Motta

1972
1st London six day (Wembley), with Patrick Sercu
1st Balderton (GBR)
3rd Woodstock (GBR)

1973
4th London, Six Days (GBR); with Graeme Gilmore

1974
2nd Black Park (GBR)
3rd London, Six Days (GBR); with Sigi Renz

1975
2nd London, Six Days (GBR); with Wilfried Peffgen
1st Morecambe (GBR)

1977
4th London, Six Days (GBR); with Gunther Haritz

1978
5th London, Six Days (GBR); with Patrick Sercu
