= Ian Alsop =

Scottish racing cyclist (1943–2020)

Personal information
- Full name: Ian Clunies Alsop
- Born: 14 June 1943 Wembley, London, England
- Died: 2 May 2020 (aged 76)

Cycling career
- Sport: Cycling
- Discipline: Track
- Role: Rider

Amateur team
- City of Edinburgh; Polytechnic CC, London
Medal record
Cycling
Representing England
British Empire & Commonwealth Games
Gold medal – first place	1966 Kingston	10 mile scratch race

Ian Clunies Alsop (14 June 1943 – 2 May 2020) was a former British competitive track cyclist.

== Cycling career ==
Alsop represented the England team in the 1966 Commonwealth Games, and he won the gold medal in the 10 mile scratch race. He also competed in the 1 km time trial.

He also represented Great Britain at the 1968 Olympic Games in Mexico.

== Palmarès ==
1959
Junior Men 500m Sprint, Herne Hill, silver
1960
Junior Men 500m Sprint, Coventry, bronze

1962
1st Tandem Sprint, British National Tandem Sprint Championships, Amateur, with Roger Whitfield

1963
Amateur 1000m Sprint, Herne Hill, silver
Amateur 4000m Team Pursuit, Fallowfield, gold (Polytechnic CC team)

1964
2nd Tandem Sprint, British National Tandem Sprint Championships, Amateur, with Brian Dacey
Amateur 4000m Team Pursuit, Wolverhampton, bronze (Polytechnic CC team)

1965
2nd Tandem Sprint, British National Tandem Sprint Championships, Amateur, with Tony Gowland
Amateur 1000m Sprint, Salford Park, silver
Amateur Division 4000m Team Pursuit, Kirkby, gold (North London team)

1966
Amateur Sprint, Kirkby, silver
Amateur Kilometre Time Trial, Welwyn, silver
Amateur 4000m Team Pursuit, Wolverhampton, silver (Polytechnic CC)
Amateur Division 4000m Team Pursuit, Herne Hill, silver (North London)
Amateur 10 mile Scratch, Nottingham, gold
Amateur 50 mile Madison, Salford Park, gold (w/Tony Gowland)

1967
2nd Tandem Sprint, British National Tandem Sprint Championships, Amateur, with Tony Gowland
Amateur 10 mile Scratch, Halesowen, gold
Amateur Division 4000m Team Pursuit, Salford Park, silver (North London)
Amateur 50 mile Madison, Herne Hill, bronze (w/Tony Gowland)

1968
1st Tandem Sprint, British National Tandem Sprint Championships, Amateur, with Geoff Cooke
Amateur Kilometre Time Trial, Herne Hill, tied for bronze
Amateur 4000m Team Pursuit, Scunthorpe, gold (Polytechnic CC)

== World's Championship and Olympic performances ==
1963
Rocourt, Belgium, Amateur Sprint, competed
Rocourt, Belgium, Amateur Team Pursuit, 13th place (GB team)
1965
San Sebastian, Spain, Amateur Sprint, competed
San Sebastian, Spain, Amateur Team Pursuit, 8th place (GB team)
1966
Frankfurt, Germany, Amateur Team Pursuit, 7th place (GB team)
1967
Amsterdam, the Netherlands, Amateur Team Pursuit, 8th place (GB team)
1968
Mexico Olympics, 4000m Team Pursuit, 12th place (GB team)
