= Lauryn Therin =

British sportswoman

Lauryn Therin (born 19 January 1986) is a British track cyclist and a former bobsledder and track and field athlete.

Initially she focused on track and field sports as a youth, mainly taking part in the javelin throw. Her international debut came in the discus throw at the 2003 World Youth Championships in Athletics, where she came eighth in qualifying. She was a double bronze medallist in the discus and javelin at the Athletics at the 2004 Commonwealth Youth Games (the discus was won by future world champion Dani Samuels).

She went on to study at Cardiff Metropolitan University, where she competed in various throw events. She represented Jersey at the 2006 Commonwealth Games in Melbourne, coming fourteenth in the discus throw. Following that, she had her highest finish at the national level, taking fourth place in the javelin at the British Athletics Championships. The repeated that finish the following year. The 2007 Island Games saw Therin take a gold medal sweep in the throws by coming first in the shot, discus and javelin events. She was also part of the Jersey women's 4×100 metres relay team. This was to be her final international athletics competition, however. Her personal best results were 47.25 metres in the discus throw, achieved in 2005; and 52.09 metres in the javelin throw, achieved in May 2007 in Bedford.

She competed in bobsleigh and was a medallist for Great Britain at the FIBT World Championships 2008. She left the sport that same year and took part in UK Sport's Girls4Gold programme, which identified her talent for cycling. She established herself as a national level cyclist at the 2012 British National Team Sprint Championships, where she shared in the silver medal with teammate Eleanor Richardson. She began acting as a tandem pilot for visually-impaired Paralympian cyclists and she helped Aileen McGlynn to two bronze medals at the 2013 British National Track Championships. The following year she piloted Rhiannon Henry to a silver medal at the 2014 event. She and Henry teamed up again for the 2014 UCI Para-cycling Road World Championships.
