= Charline Jones =

Scottish racing cyclist

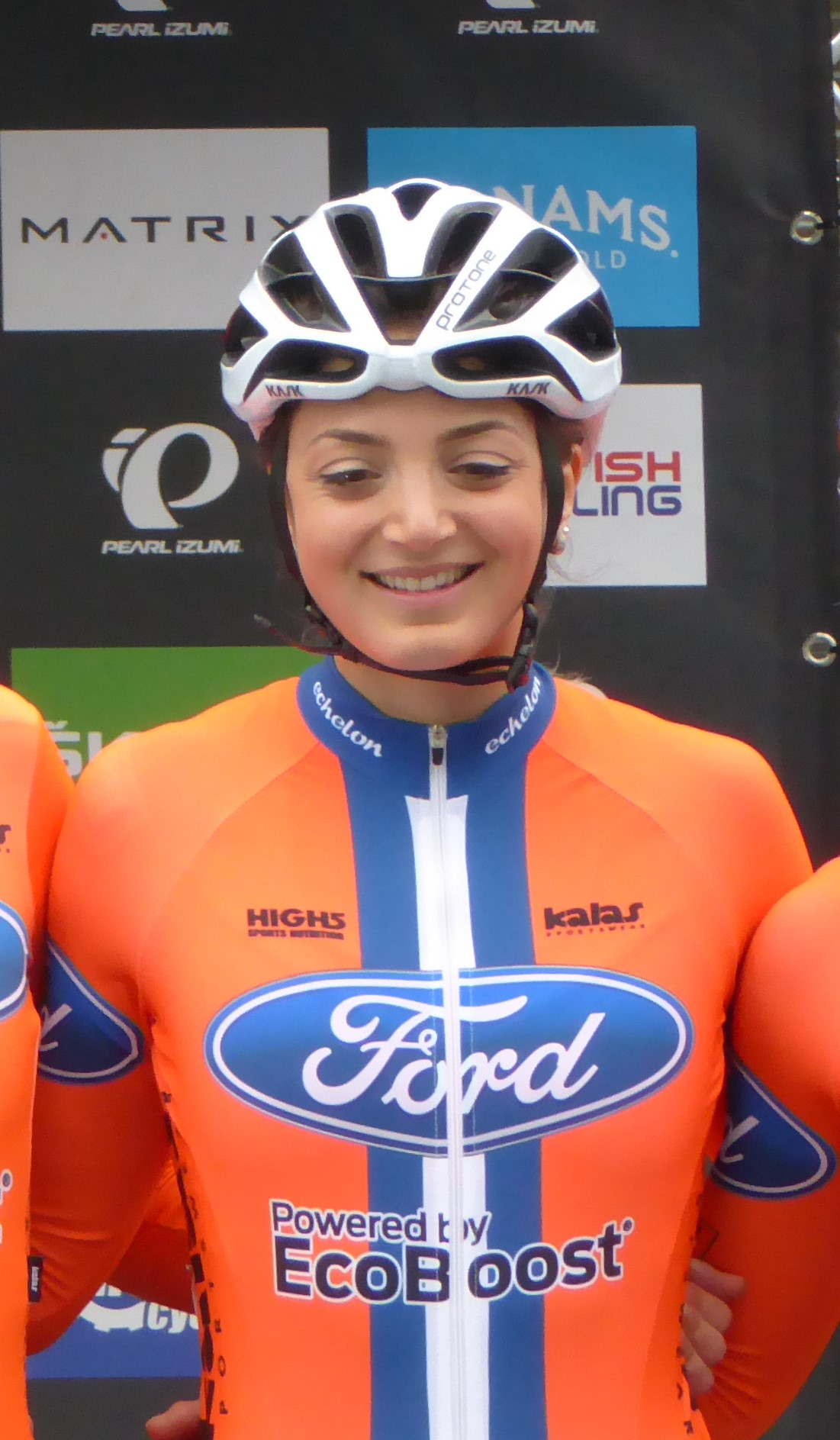

Personal information
- Full name: Charline Jones
- Born: Charline Joiner; 18 April 1988 (age 38) Dunfermline, Scotland
- Height: 168 cm (5 ft 6 in)
- Weight: 61 kg (134 lb)

Cycling career
- Sport: Cycling
- Current team: Retired
- Disciplines: Road; Track
- Role: Rider
- Rider type: Sprinter

Amateur teams
- 2007: Sandy Wallace Cycles
- 2008–2009: City of Edinburgh RC
- 2013: MG Maxifuel
- 2014: Madison–Boot Out Breast Cancer Care
- 2015: Team WNT
- 2016: Team Ford EcoBoost
Medal record
Representing Scotland
Women's track cycling
Commonwealth Games
Silver medal – second place	2010 Delhi	Women's team sprint

Charline Jones (née Joiner; born 18 April 1988) is a Scottish former racing cyclist from Dunfermline, who won a silver medal at the 2010 Commonwealth Games, in the team sprint.

== Personal life ==
In 2018, she married Glasgow Warriors and Scotland rugby union player Lee Jones. Her brother Craig Joiner also represented Scotland in rugby union, while her father Mike and sister Kerry represented Scotland in triathlon and hockey respectively.

== Major results ==
2008
3rd Team sprint, National Track Championships
2009
2nd Team sprint, National Track Championships
2010
Commonwealth Games

2nd Team sprint
6th Sprint

2nd Team sprint, National Track Championships
2012
Scottish Track Championships

1st Keirin
1st Individual pursuit
1st Scratch

National Track Championships

2nd Individual pursuit
2nd Points race
3rd Keirin

2013
2nd Madison, National Track Championships (with Katie Archibald)
2014
3rd Criterium, National Road Championships
2015
1st Crit on the Campus
1st Round 3 – Croydon, Matrix Fitness Grand Prix series
2nd Stafford Grand Prix
4th Women's Tour de Yorkshire
6th Overall Tour of the Reservoir
7th Cheshire Classic
9th Milk Race
2016
6th London Nocturne

== See also ==
- City of Edinburgh Racing Club
- Achievements of members of City of Edinburgh Racing Club
