= William-Francis Burl =

British cyclist

Personal information
- Born: 6 January 1905
- Died: 5 October 1966 (aged 61)

Cycling career
- Sport: Cycling
- Discipline: Road
- Role: Rider

William-Francis Burl (6 January 1905 – 5 October 1966) was a British racing cyclist. He rode in the 1937 Tour de France.
