= Joe Nally =

Scottish cyclist

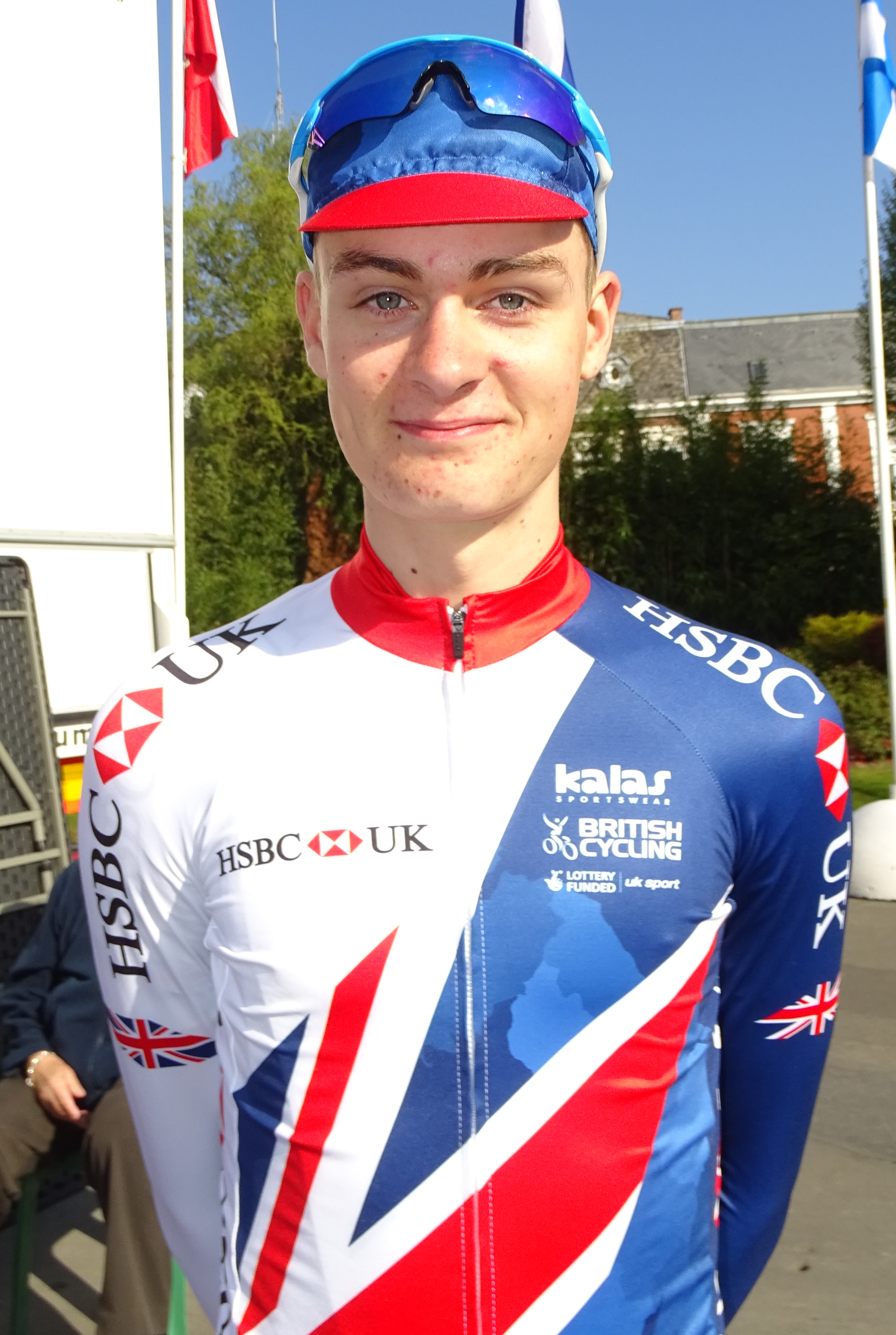
- Nally in 2017

Personal information
- Full name: Joseph Nally
- Born: 13 July 1999 (age 27) Charlestown, Fife, Scotland

Cycling career
- Sport: Cycling
- Current team: Vitus Pro Cycling Team p/b Brother UK
- Disciplines: Road; Track
- Role: Rider
- Rider type: Endurance (track)

Amateur teams
- 2010: Carnegie Cyclones
- 2011–2017: www.Hardie-Bikes.com
- 2018: 100% ME
- 2019: Team Inspired

Professional team
- 2020–: Vitus Pro Cycling Team p/b Brother UK

Joseph Nally (born 13 July 1999) is a British road and track cyclist from Scotland, who currently rides for UCI Continental team Vitus Pro Cycling Team p/b Brother UK.

Nally became a British champion after winning the British National Points Championships at the 2017 British National Track Championships.

== Major results ==
2017
1st Points race, National Track Championships
Junior Tour of Wales

1st Stages 3 & 4

2nd Team pursuit, UEC European Junior Track Championships
