= Steve Heffernan =

English cyclist

Personal information
- Nationality: United Kingdom
- Born: 24 October 1952 (age 73) London

Sport
- Sport: Cycling
Medal record
Track Cycling
Representing England
Commonwealth Games
Gold medal – first place	1974 Christchurch	scratch race

Stephen 'Steve' Heffernan (born 1952) is an English former professional track cyclist.

== Cycling career ==
He represented England and won a gold medal in the 10 mile scratch race, at the 1974 British Commonwealth Games in Christchurch, New Zealand and also competed in the time trial.

He was the winner of seven National Championships.
