= Simon Lillistone =

British cyclist

Personal information
- Born: 13 February 1969 (age 57) Shrewsbury, England

Cycling career
- Sport: Cycling
Medal record
Cycling
Representing England
Commonwealth Games
| Bronze medal – third place | 1990 Auckland | team pursuit |
| Silver medal – second place | 1994 Victoria | team time trial |

Simon Lillistone (born 13 February 1969) is a male British former cyclist.

== Cycling career ==
He competed at the 1988 Summer Olympics and the 1992 Summer Olympics.

He represented England in the scratch race and won a bronze medal in the 4,000 metres team pursuit, at the 1990 Commonwealth Games in Auckland, New Zealand. Four years later at the 1994 Commonwealth Games in Victoria, British Columbia, Canada he won a silver medal in the team time trial and competed in the scratch race and points race.
