= Tony Gibb =

British cyclist

Personal information
- Born: 12 July 1976 (age 50) Stanmore, Harrow, London, England
- Height: 1.87 m (6 ft 2 in)
- Weight: 147 kg (324 lb)

Cycling career
- Sport: Cycling
- Current team: Retired
- Discipline: Track
- Role: Rider

Professional teams
- 2005: Driving Force Logistics
- 2006–2009: Plowman Craven–Evans Cycles
Medal record
Representing United Kingdom
Men's track cycling
World Championships
Silver medal – second place	2002 Ballerup	Scratch

Anthony Gibb (born 12 July 1976) is a British former track cyclist.

In 2016, Gibb was found guilty of dangerous driving and was given a three-month suspended sentence and a year-long driving ban.

== Major results ==
2000
1st Points race, National Track Championships
1st Madison, National Track Championships (with James Taylor)
2001
1st Scratch, National Track Championships
1st Madison, National Track Championships (with James Taylor)
2002
2nd Scratch, World Track Championships
2003
1st Six Days of Turin (with Scott McGrory)
2004
1st Madison, National Track Championships (with James Taylor)
2005
1st Madison, National Track Championships (with James Taylor)
2006
1st Madison, National Track Championships (with James Taylor)
1st Omnium, National Track Championships
