= Jacob Ragan =

British cyclist

Personal information
- Born: 4 March 1995 (age 31)

Cycling career
- Sport: Cycling
- Current team: Albion Cycling
- Disciplines: Road and Track cycling
- Role: Rider
- Rider type: Pursuit

Jacob Ragan (born 1995) is a British road and track cyclist.

== Cycling career ==
Ragan became a British team champion when winning the Team Pursuit Championship at the 2013 British National Track Championships riding for Wheelbase Altura MGD.
