= The Running Viola =

British athlete, musician and television personality

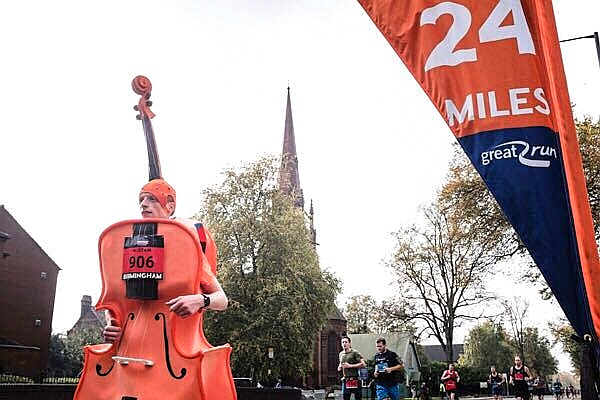
- The Running Viola at Birmingham International Marathon 2017
- Born: Alistair Rutherford; 10 April 1995 (age 31); Liverpool
- Occupations: Athlete; Musician; Public Figure; Project Manager

Alistair Rutherford, known more widely as The Running Viola, is a British athlete, musician and television personality. He is a current double Guinness World Record holder for the fastest marathon and the fastest half marathon dressed as a musical instrument.

== Career ==
Originally from Liverpool, Rutherford studied as a violist at the Royal Birmingham Conservatoire, graduating in 2017. The concept of The Running Viola came to him as an idea to raise money for arco, a charity providing musical education for children in South Africa in conjunction with Birmingham City University and the Morris Isaacson Centre for Music. He has since become the manager of the project.
