= Harriet Owen =

British cyclist

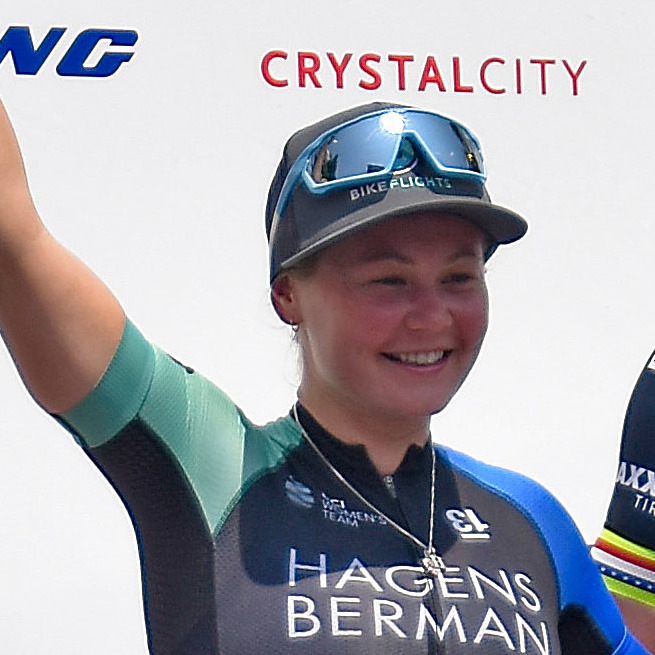
- Owen in 2019

Personal information
- Full name: Harriet Owen
- Nickname: Baz
- Born: 16 December 1993 (age 32) Kirtlington, Oxfordshire, England
- Height: 5 ft (152 cm) 3

Cycling career
- Sport: Cycling
- Current team: Retired
- Disciplines: Road and Track
- Role: Rider
- Rider type: Sprinter

Amateur teams
- 2011–2012: Motorpoint Pro–Cycling Team
- 2013–2014: Matrix Fitness Racing Academy
- 2016: Matrix Fitness–Corley Cycles
- 2016–2017: Velo Classic p/b Stan's No Tubes
- 2018: The Meteor // Intelligentsia
- 2020: Butcherbox Cycling

Professional teams
- 2015: Matrix Fitness Pro Cycling
- 2018–2019: Hagens Berman–Supermint
- 2021: InstaFund Racing
- 2023–2024: DNA Pro Cycling

Major wins
- Tour of America's Dairyland's

Harriet Owen (born 16 December 1993) is a British professional racing cyclist, who rode for UCI Women's Continental Team InstaFund Racing in 2021 and finished her racing career with UCI DNA Pro Cycling in 2024 and 2025. She grew up racing track, with the British Cycling Team, gaining 2nd Place at the Junior World Track Championships, in the Scratch Race. She moved onto the road with Matrix Pro Cycling and moved onto racing in the USA.

== Career ==
Born in Kirtlington, Oxfordshire, Owen was educated at Marlborough School, Woodstock. She joined the Matrix Fitness Racing Academy team from Node 4–Giordana Racing in 2013, leaving in 2016 to race criteriums in the United States.

In 2019 she took third place in the Armed Forces Cycling Classic in the Crystal Cup behind Kendall Ryan (Team TIBCO-Silicon Valley Bank) and Natalie Redmond (Fearless Femme Racing p-b Altam).

== See also ==
- List of 2015 UCI Women's Teams and riders
