= Sam Harrison (cyclist) =

Welsh cyclist (born 1992)

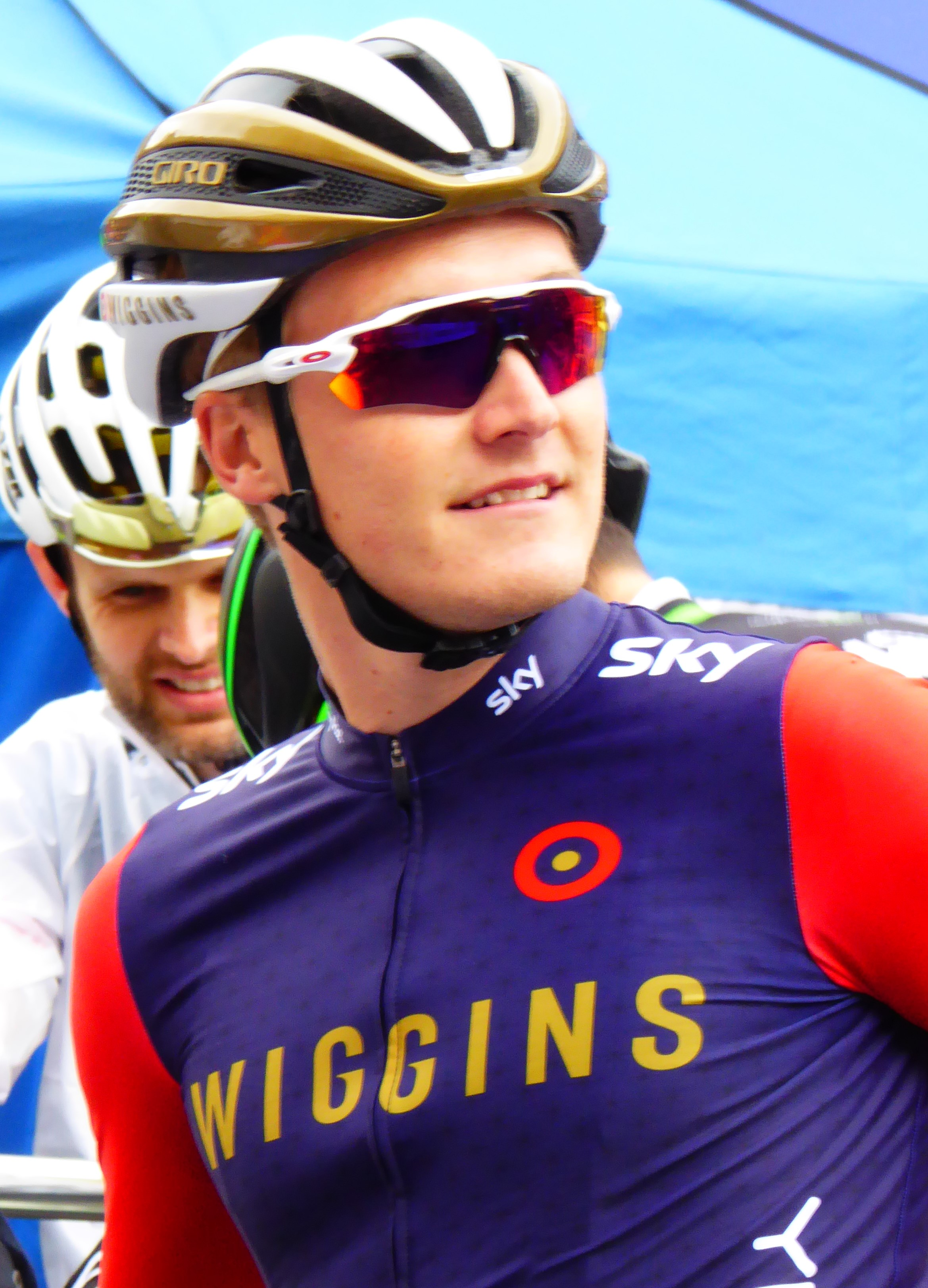

Personal information
- Full name: Samuel James Harrison
- Nickname: Sam
- Born: 24 June 1992 (age 34) Risca, Wales

Cycling career
- Sport: Cycling
- Current team: Team Wiggins Le Col
- Disciplines: Road, Track, Cyclo-cross, MTB
- Role: Rider

Amateur teams
- ?: Cwmcarn Paragon
- 2006–2010: Planet-X
- 2011–2013: 100% ME

Professional teams
- 2014–2015: NFTO
- 2016–2017: WIGGINS
Medal record
Representing Great Britain
Men's track cycling
World Championships
Silver medal – second place	2013 Minsk	Team pursuit
Bronze medal – third place	2011 Apeldoorn	Team pursuit

Samuel James Harrison (born 24 June 1992) is a Welsh former racing cyclist. He has twice won medals at the UCI Track Cycling World Championships, in 2011, and 2013.

== Cycling career ==
Harrison is from Risca, Newport. He tried cycling after hearing his friends saying that Newport Velodrome was fun, and at the age of 13 he was soon racing with the local club, Cwmcarn Paragon. He was selected to be a member of British Cycling's Olympic Development Programme in 2008.

Harrison was nominated for the BBC's Young Sports Personality award in 2008, after winning three titles in the youth competition of the British National Track Championships. In February 2009, he was selected to represent Great Britain at the UCI Cyclo-cross World Championships. He also won two medals at the Under-23 European Track Championships.

2011 saw Harrison break-through at a senior level. He won his first competition at the UCI Track World Cup event in Beijing, winning the omnium. The first appearance for Harrison at the UCI World Track Championships came in 2011, in which he won a bronze medal as part of the Team Pursuit. He was selected in the final after regular starter Ed Clancy fell ill. Harrison also finished 11th in the omnium.

Harrison was left out of the Team GB squad for the 2012 World Championships and 2012 Olympic Games after more experienced riders returned to the team. He won the under-23 title at the British National Time Trial Championships. 2013 saw Harrison return to the British squad for the World Championships, in which he formed part of the silver medal winning Team Pursuit team. Harrison signed for the NFTO team for the 2014 season.

Harrison represented Wales at the Commonwealth Games in Glasgow, 2014.

He was named as a member of the WIGGINS team for the 2016 season.

== Major results ==
2009
1st Team pursuit, National Track Championships
UEC European Junior Track Championships

2nd Team pursuit
3rd Madison

2nd Overall Junior Tour of Wales
2010
UCI Junior Track World Championships

2nd Omnium
2nd Team pursuit

National Track Championships

2nd Madison
3rd Individual pursuit

2nd Overall Junior Tour of Wales
7th Paris–Roubaix Juniors
2011
1st Omnium – Beijing, UCI Track World Cup
National Track Championships

2nd Individual pursuit
3rd Kilo

2nd Team pursuit, UEC European Under–23 Track Championships
3rd Team pursuit, UCI Track World Championships
2012
1st Time trial, National Under–23 Road Championships
2013
1st Time trial, National Under–23 Road Championships
2nd Team pursuit, UCI Track World Championships
National Track Championships

1st Scratch race
2nd Points race

1st Team pursuit, UEC European Track Championships
2014
2nd Team pursuit, National Track Championships
2016
3rd Omnium – Glasgow, UCI Track World Cup

== Personal life ==
Harrison attended Coleg Gwent at Crosskeys. Six of Harrison's bicycles were stolen from his family home in June 2009. They were valued at approximately £12,000 and included a bright pink Planet-X team issue bike unavailable in the shops.
