= Amy Roberts =

Welsh racing cyclist (born 1994)

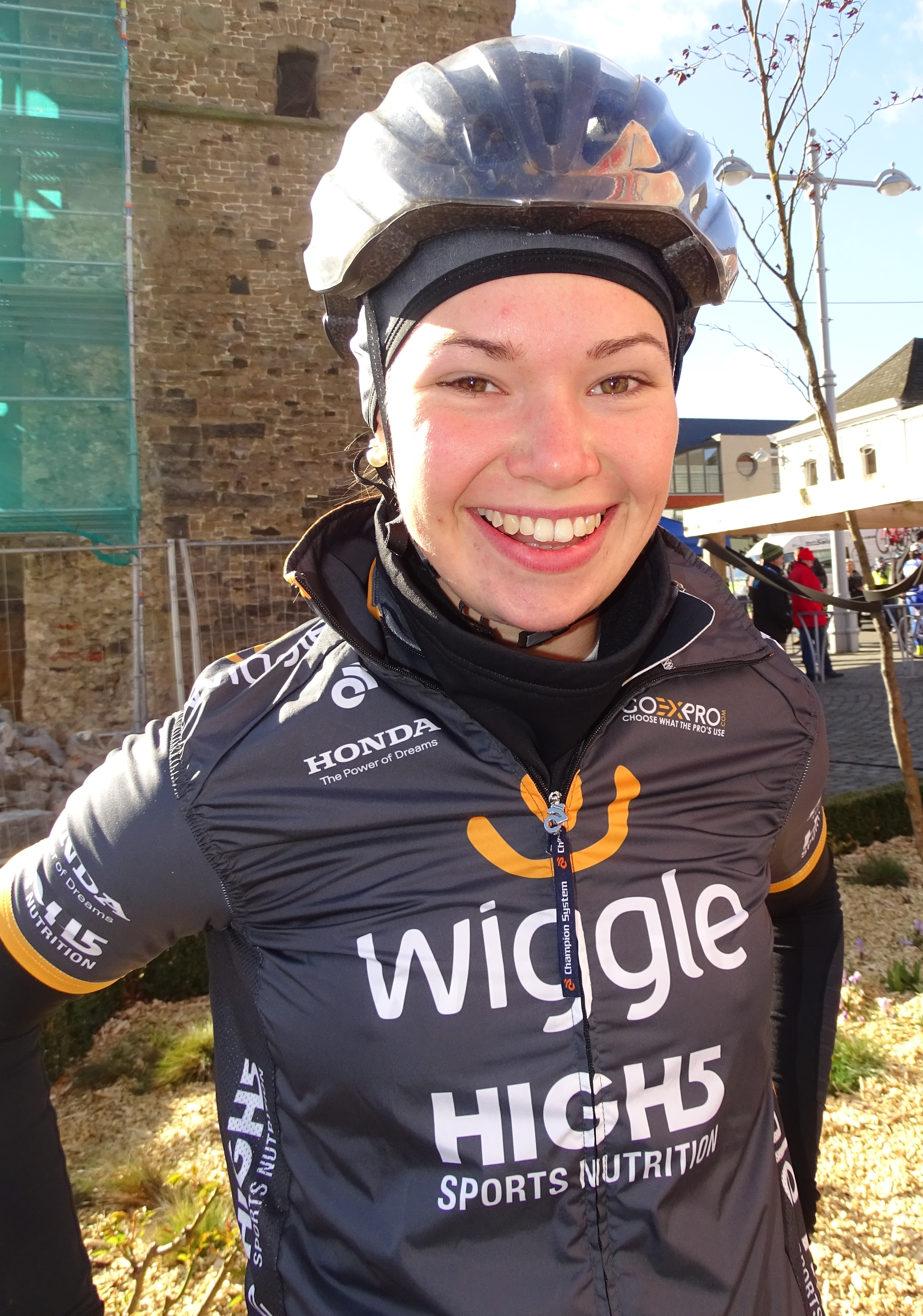
- Roberts in 2016.

Personal information
- Full name: Amy Rose Roberts
- Born: 24 December 1994 (age 31) Llanelli, Wales, United Kingdom
- Height: 1.74 m (5 ft 9 in)
- Weight: 61 kg (134 lb)

Cycling career
- Sport: Cycling
- Disciplines: Road; Track
- Role: Rider
- Rider type: Endurance

Amateur teams
- ?: Towy Riders
- 2006–2007: Bynea CC
- 2008: Kidney Wales For Escentual
- 2009–2011: Cardiff Ajax CC
- 2012: Team USN
- 2012: Scott Contessa Epic

Professional teams
- 2013–2017: Wiggle–Honda
- 2018: Parkhotel Valkenburg

Amy Rose Roberts (born 24 December 1994) is a Welsh racing cyclist, who last rode for UCI Women's Team Parkhotel Valkenburg.

== Career ==
Born in Llanelli, Roberts was brought up in Pontyberem. She attended Queen Elizabeth High School, Carmarthen. Roberts took up triathlon at the age of 14, she joined the Towy Riders cycling club to improve her cycling skills and within a year of doing so had become the Under-16 Welsh National Cyclo-cross Champion. Roberts was part of British Cycling's Olympic Talent Team.

Roberts represented Wales at the Commonwealth Games in Glasgow, 2014, competing in the time trial, individual pursuit, scratch and points race.

== Personal life ==
Roberts' younger sister Jessica Roberts is also a professional cyclist, who won the 2018 British National Road Race Championships.

== Major results ==
2010
National Track Championships

1st Youth Points race
3rd Junior Scratch
3rd Youth Individual pursuit
3rd Youth 500m time trial

2011
3rd Junior National Cyclo-cross Championships

2012
1st Team pursuit, UEC European Junior Track Championships (with Elinor Barker and Lucy Garner)
1st Overall Surf & Turf Weekend

1st Stage 2

2nd Team pursuit, 2012–13 UCI Track World Cup, Cali
UCI Junior Track World Championships

3rd Points race
3rd Team pursuit (with Hayley Jones and Elinor Barker)

2013
3rd Team pursuit, 2012–13 UCI Track World Cup, Aguascalientes (with Ciara Horne and Elinor Barker)

2014
1st Team pursuit, 2014–15 UCI Track World Cup, Guadalajara (with Laura Trott, Elinor Barker & Ciara Horne)
1st Round 4 – Redditch, Matrix Fitness Grand Prix Series
2nd Omnium, Open des Nations sur Piste de Roubaix
2nd National Criterium Championships

2015
2nd Points race, Irish International Track GP
3rd National Criterium Championships
