= Jonathan Dibben =

British cyclist (born 1994)

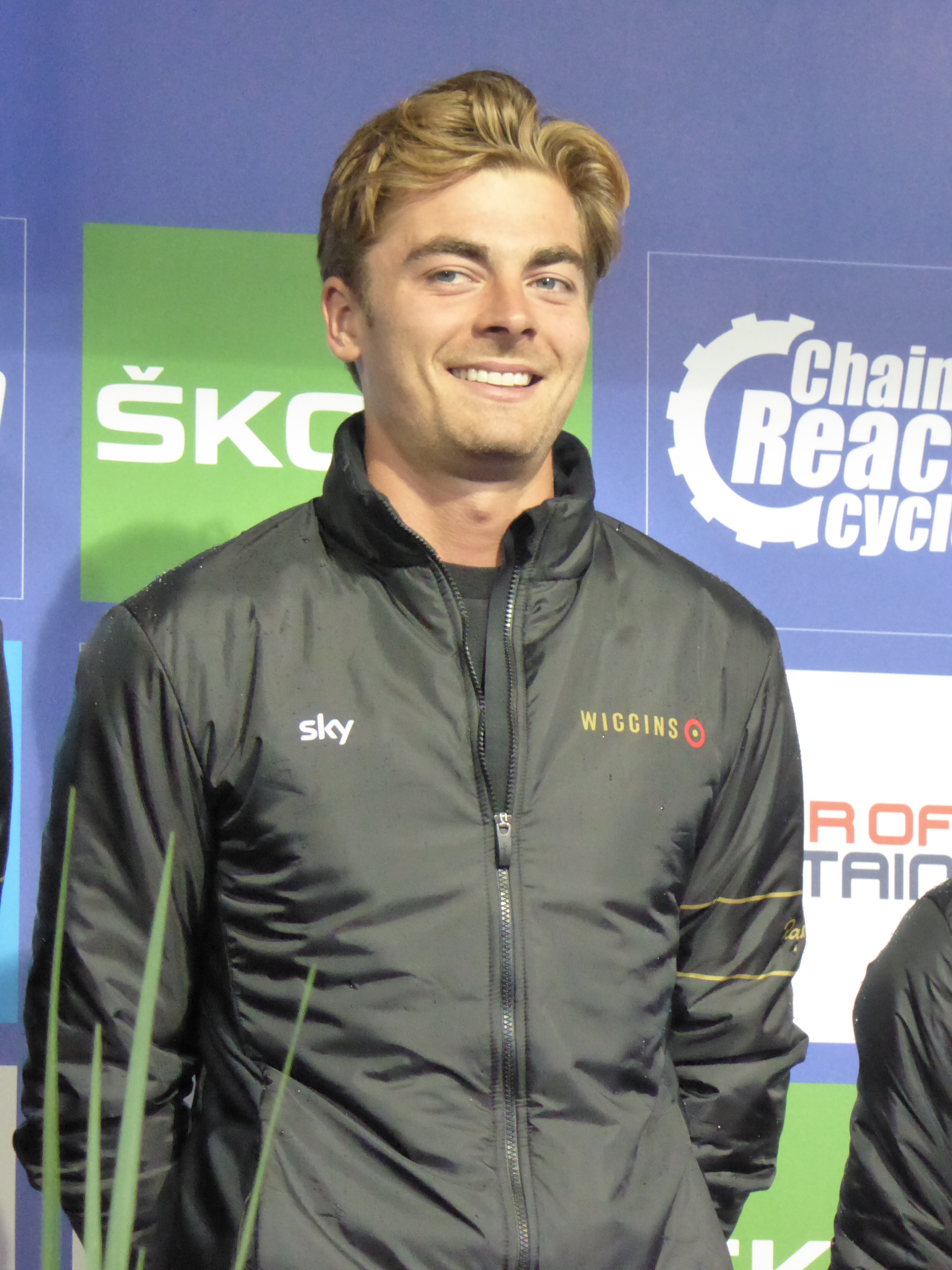
- Dibben in 2016

Personal information
- Full name: Jonathan Mark Dibben
- Born: 12 February 1994 (age 32) Southampton, England

Cycling career
- Sport: Cycling
- Current team: Retired
- Disciplines: Road; Track
- Role: Rider

Amateur teams
- 2007–2009: Dave Harding Cyclesport
- 2014: Team 100% ME

Professional teams
- 2015–2016: WIGGINS
- 2016: Cannondale–Drapac (stagiaire)
- 2017–2018: Team Sky
- 2019: Madison Genesis
- 2020: Lotto–Soudal

Major wins
- Track World Championships Points race (2016)
Medal record
Representing Great Britain
Men's track cycling
World Championships
| Gold medal – first place | 2016 London | Points race |
| Silver medal – second place | 2016 London | Team pursuit |
European Championships
| Gold medal – first place | 2014 Guadeloupe | Team pursuit |
| Gold medal – first place | 2015 Grenchen | Team pursuit |
| Silver medal – second place | 2014 Guadeloupe | Omnium |
| Bronze medal – third place | 2015 Grenchen | Omnium |

Jonathan Mark Dibben (born 12 February 1994) is a British former racing cyclist, who rode professionally between 2015 and 2020, for the WIGGINS, Team Sky, Madison Genesis and Lotto–Soudal teams. His older brother Peter Dibben is a British cycling champion on the track.

He rode at the 2015 UCI Track Cycling World Championships. At the 2016 UCI Track Cycling World Championships he won a gold medal in the points race and a silver medal in the team pursuit event. In October 2020, he was named in the startlist for the 2020 Giro d'Italia.

After his contract with Lotto–Soudal was not renewed, Dibben retired from professional cycling at the end of the 2020 season, and became a coach.

== Major results ==
=== Road ===
2011
4th Paris–Roubaix Juniors
8th Time trial, UCI World Junior Championships
2012
1st Stage 3b Trofeo Karlsberg
3rd Paris–Roubaix Juniors
5th Road race, UCI World Junior Championships
2014
1st Stage 2a (ITT) Le Triptyque des Monts et Châteaux
6th Time trial, UCI World Under-23 Championships
2015
8th Overall ZLM Tour
2016
2nd Overall Le Triptyque des Monts et Châteaux

1st Stage 3a (ITT)

2nd Ronde van Vlaanderen Beloften
4th Duo Normand (with Scott Davies)
7th Beaumont Trophy
9th Road race, UCI World Under-23 Championships
2017 (1 pro win)
1st Stage 6 (ITT) Tour of California
6th Trofeo Porreres–Felanitx–Ses Salines–Campos
2018
1st Stage 1b (TTT) Settimana Internazionale di Coppi e Bartali

==== Grand Tour general classification results timeline ====
| Grand Tour | 2020 |
|---|---|
| Giro d'Italia | 133 |
| Tour de France | — |
| Vuelta a España | — |

Legend
| — | Did not compete |
| DNF | Did not finish |

=== Track ===
2011
National Championships

1st Team pursuit
3rd Individual pursuit

1st Individual pursuit, National Junior Championships
2012
National Championships

2nd Individual pursuit
2nd Scratch

2nd Omnium, UCI World Junior Championships
2014
UEC European Championships

1st Team pursuit
2nd Omnium

3rd Individual pursuit, National Championships
2015
UEC European Championships

1st Team pursuit
3rd Omnium

National Championships

2nd Scratch
3rd Individual pursuit

2016
UCI World Championships

1st Points race
2nd Team pursuit

1st Points race, UEC European Under-23 Championships
