= British National Scratch Championships =

British cycling national competition

The British National Scratch Championships are held annually as part of the British National Track Championships organised by British Cycling. A women's championship was held for the first time in 1995.

Medallists for each race are shown in the tables below.

== Men's Senior Race ==
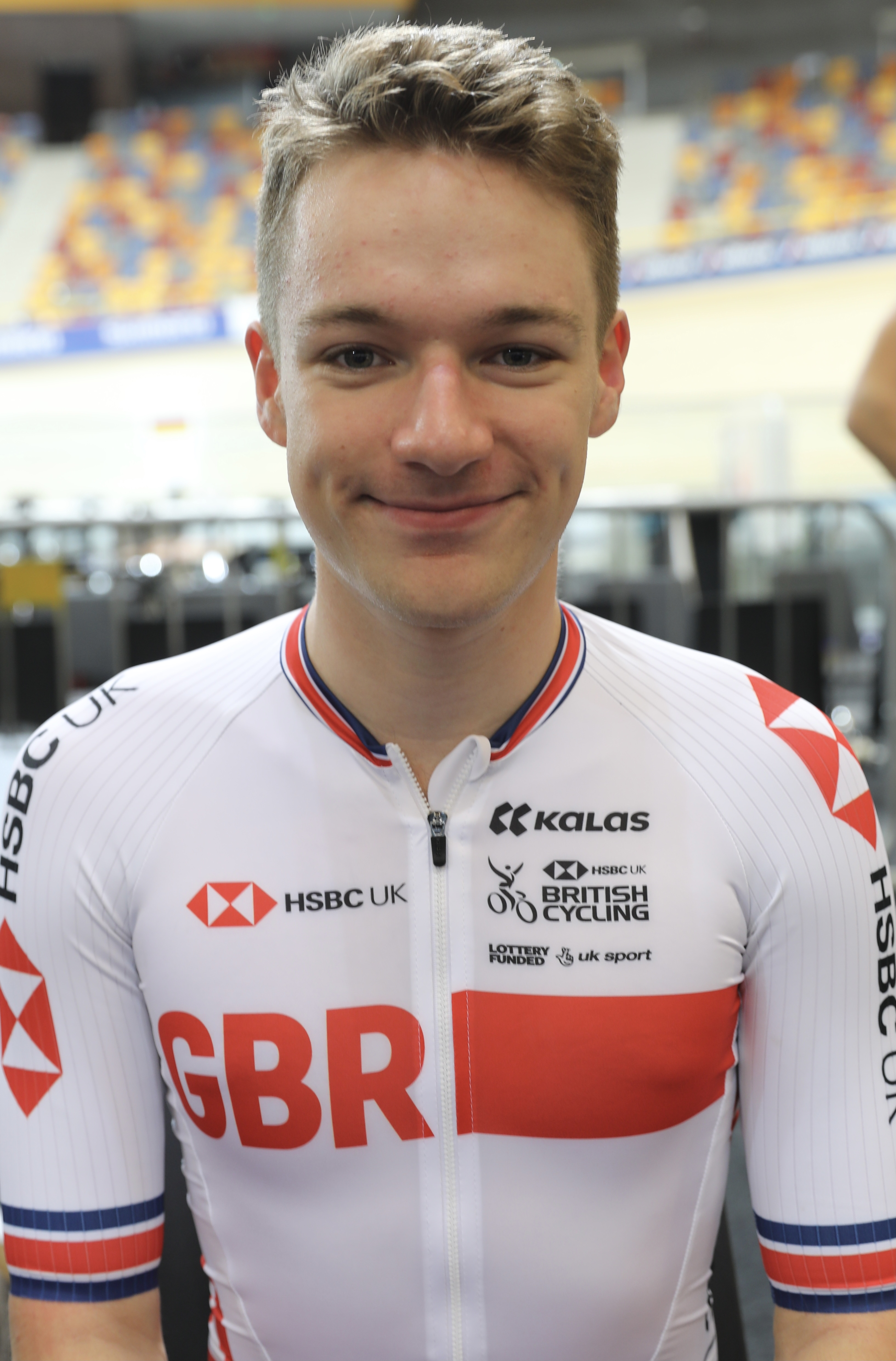
Ethan Hayter

Year	Gold	Silver	Bronze	Ref
1966	Ian Alsop			
1967	Ian Alsop			
1968				
1969				
1970				
1971				
1972				
1973				
1974	Maurice Burton	Steve Heffernan	Malcolm Hall	
1975	Ian Hallam	Robin Crocker	Gary Cresswell	
1976	Ian Hallam	Paul Fennell	Gary Cresswell	
1977	Ian Hallam	Glen Mitchell	Tony James	
1978	Glen Mitchell	Tony Doyle	Derek Hunt	
1979	Gary Cresswell	Mick Davies	Graeme Nisbet	
1980	Nigel Redmile	Glen Mitchell	Sean Yates	
1981	Glen Mitchell	Paul Doel	Gary Sadler	
1982	Gary Sadler	Dave Edwards	Dennis Lightfoot	
1983	Shaun Wallace	Glen Mitchell	Gary Sadler	
1984	Shaun Wallace	Steve Paulding	Gary Coltman	
1985	Steve Paulding			
1986	Steve Paulding			
1987	Alastair Wood	Bruce Drew	Paul Wain	
1988				
1989				
1990	Jeff Snodin	Guy Rowlands	Neil Crossthwaite	
1991	Glen Sword	Antony Wallis	Steve Clark	
1992	Anthony Stirrat	Steve Clark	Jeff Snodin	
1993	Chris Newton			
1994	Anthony Stirrat	Gary Coltman	Russell Williams	
1995	Chris Newton	Anthony Stirrat	Bryan Steel	
1996	Shaun Wallace	Bryan Steel	Jonathan Hargreaves	
1997	Craig MacLean	Jon Clay	James Notley	
1998	Rob Wood	Peter Jacques	Tony Gibb	
1999	Huw Pritchard	Tony Gibb	James Taylor	
2000	Benedict Elliott	Alwyn McMath	Tony Gibb	
2001	= Tony Gibb = James Taylor		James Notley	
2002	Russell Downing	Mark Kelly	James Taylor	
2003	Chris Newton	Russell Downing	Mark Kelly	
2004	Chris Newton	Tony Gibb	Russell Downing	
2005	Geraint Thomas	Mark Cavendish	Ben Swift	
2006	Chris Newton	Kieran Page	Ian Stannard	
2007	Steven Burke	Chris Newton	Peter Kennaugh	
2008	Chris Newton	Andrew Magnier	Jonathan Mould	
2009	Chris Newton	Alex Dowsett	Mark Christian	
2010	Peter Kennaugh	Simon Yates	Geraint Thomas	
2011	Jonathan Mould	Adam Duggleby	Adam Yates	
2012	Adam Duggleby	Jon Dibben	Adam Yates	
2013	Sam Harrison	Ed Clancy	Steven Burke	
2014	Oliver Wood	Zachery May	Christopher Latham	
2015	Mark Stewart	Jon Dibben	Christopher Latham	
2017	Ethan Hayter	Frank Longstaff	Zachery May	
2018	Oliver Wood	Rhys Britton	Matthew Walls	
2019	Ethan Hayter	Mark Stewart	William Tidball	
2020	Rhys Britton	Max Rushby	Ethan Vernon	
2021 not held due to COVID-19
2022	William Tidball	Oscar Nilsson-Julien	Joshua Giddings	
2023	Joe Holt	Matthew Brennan	Jack Rootkin-Gray	
2024	Sam Fisher	Archie Fletcher	Will Roberts	
2025	Noah Hobbs	Sam Fisher	William Gilbank	
2026	Matthew Bostock	William Roberts	Oliver Wood	

== Women's Senior Race ==
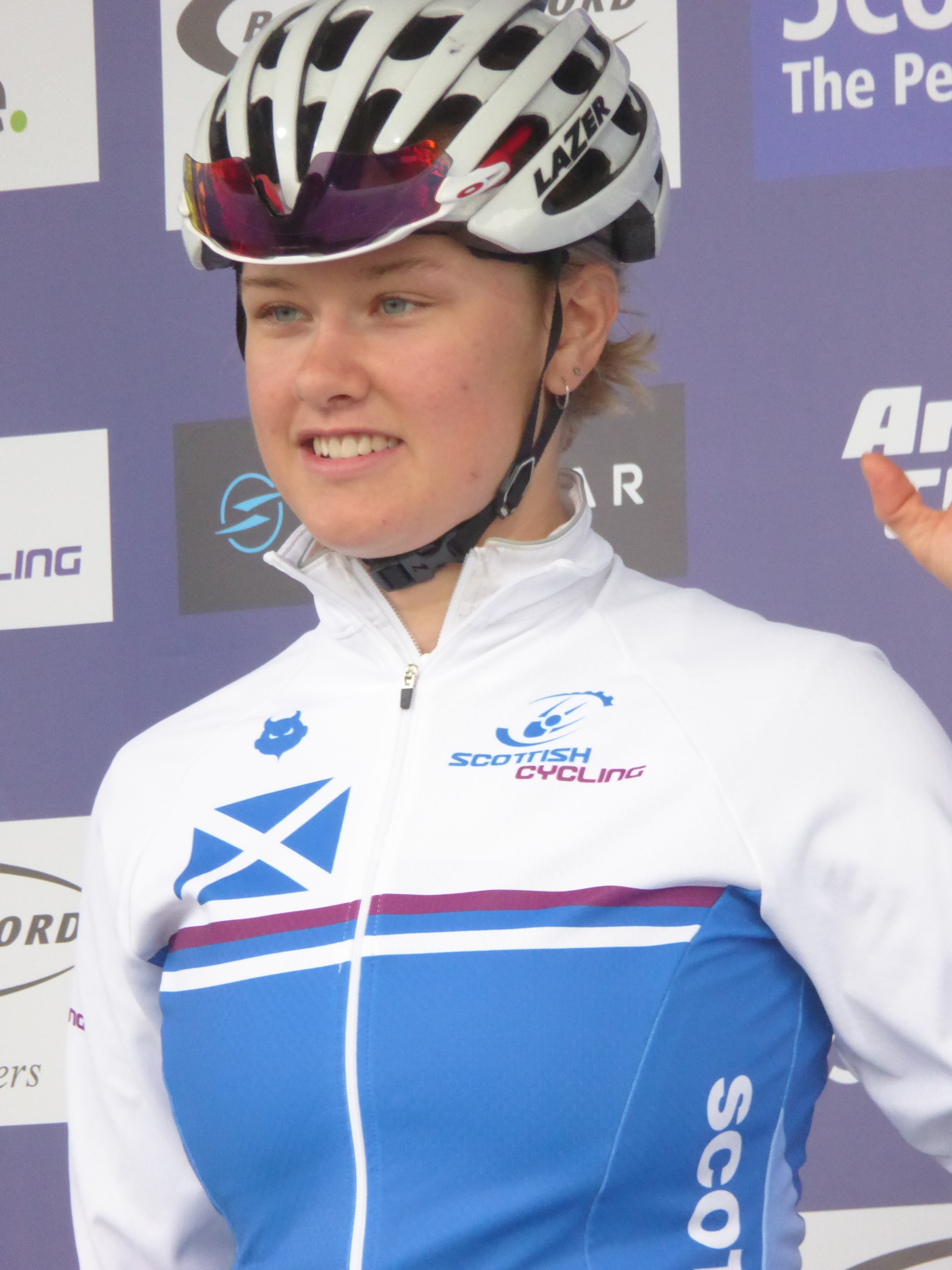
Jenny Holl, 2024 champion

Year	Gold	Silver	Bronze	Ref
1995	Wendy Everson			
1996	Sally Boyden	Megan Hughes	Michelle Ward	
1997	Michelle Ward	Sally Boyden	Wendy Everson	
1998	Melanie Szubrycht	Sally Boyden	Angela Hunter	
1999	Wendy Everson	Sally Boyden	Louise Jones	
2000	Julie Forrester	Sally Boyden	Charlotte Hopkinson	
2001	Angela Hunter	Victoria Pendleton	Charlotte Hopkinson	
2002	Angela Hunter	Sally Boyden	Lorna Webb	
2003	Victoria Pendleton	Kate Cullen	Emma Davies	
2004	Katrina Hair	Kate Cullen	Jaqui Marshall	
2005	Victoria Pendleton	Rachel Heal	Nicole Cooke	
2006	Victoria Pendleton	Lizzie Armitstead	Laura Bissell	
2007	Katie Cullen	Janet Birkmyre	Katie Curtis	
2008	Hannah Rich	Alexandra Greenfield	Lucy Martin	
2009	Elizabeth Armitstead	Hannah Mayho	Dani King	
2010	Anna Blyth	Harriet Owen	Dani King	
2011	Elizabeth Armitstead	Laura Trott	Dani King	
2012	Janet Birkmyre	Lisa Daly	Kayleigh Brogan	
2013	Corrine Hall	Laura Trott	Dani King	
2014	Laura Trott	Emily Kay	Dani King	
2015	Laura Trott	Katie Archibald	Manon Lloyd	
2017	Katie Archibald	Neah Evans	Elinor Barker	
2018	Katie Archibald	Ellie Dickinson	Emily Nelson	
2019	Laura Trott	Elinor Barker	Katie Archibald	
2020	Ella Barnwell	Josie Knight	Jenny Holl	
2021 not held due to COVID-19
2022	Ella Barnwell	Anna Morris	Neah Evans	
2023	Jessica Roberts	Neah Evans	Grace Lister	
2024	Jenny Holl	Maddie Leech	Cat Ferguson	
2025	Anna Morris	Katie Archibald	Erin Boothman	
2026	Anna Morris	Jenny Holl	Phoebe Taylor	

== Junior ==
Extended content

Men's Junior Race

20 km scratch race
Year	Gold	Silver	Bronze
1995	Paul Sheppard		
1998	Bradley Wiggins	Mark Kelly	Ben Hallam
1999	Kieran Page	J Bell	D Omerod
2000	Kristian Story	Richard Teare	Jon Pettit
2001	Matthew Haynes	Duncan Hallam	Mark Cavendish
2003	Bruce Edgar	Mark Cavendish	Geraint Thomas
2004	Andrew Hill	Ian Stannard	Ross Sander
2005	Ben Swift	Adam Blythe	Steven Burke
2006	Adam Blythe	Matthew Rowe	Jonathan Bellis
2007	Christian Lyte	Adam Blythe	Peter Kennaugh
2008	Daniel McLay	Jonathan Mould	George Atkins
2009	Jonathan Mould	George Atkins	Daniel McLay
2010	Daniel McLay	Simon Yates	Sam Harrison
2011	Robert Lambton	Owain Doull	Jon Dibben
2012	Jacob Ragan	Zachery May	Christopher Latham
2013	Luc Hall	Oliver Wood	Christopher Lawless
2014	Gabriel Cullaigh	Joe Holt	Joel Partington
2015	Reece Wood	Ethan Hayter	Joseph Fry
2016	Matthew Walls	Rhys Britton	Reece Wood
2017	Tom Pidcock	Jake Stewart	Ethan Vernon

Women's Junior Race

10 km scratch race
Year	Gold	Silver	Bronze
2002	Katherine Hill	Samantha Colley	Kimberley Walsh
2003	Jenny Middlehurst	Samantha Colley	Nikki Harris
2004	Kimberley Blythe	Amy Hunt	Katie Curtis
2005	Katie Curtis	Rachel Ball	Jo Tindley
2006	Anna Blyth	Katie Curtis	Lizzie Armitstead
2007	Alex Greenfield	Hannah Mayho	Lucy Martin
2008	Helen Clayton	Danielle King	Jessica Booth
2009	Ruby Miller	Laura Trott	Lucy Garner
2010	Hannah Barnes	Harriet Owen	Amy Roberts
2011	Hannah Barnes	Elinor Barker	Harriet Owen
2012	Emily Kay	Lucy Garner	Dannielle Khan
2013	Melissa Lowther	Bethany Hayward	Keira McVitty
2014	Grace Garner	Ellie Coster	Lucy Shaw
2015	Lucy Shaw	Ellie Dickinson	Rebecca Raybould
2016	Jessica Roberts	Sophie Williams	Rachel Jary
2017	Anna Docherty	Ellie Russell	Pfeiffer Georgi
2025	Seren Thomas	Abigail Miller	Ayesha Vose

== Youth ==
Extended content

Male Youth

10 km scratch race
Year	Gold	Silver	Bronze
1999	Richard Sutcliffe	Henry Cole	I Ashworth
2000	Matthew Haynes	Tom White	Russell Holland
2001	Geraint Thomas	Jason Cattermole	Bruce Edgar
2003	Steven Burke	Ben Swift	Lewis Atkins
2004	Steven Burke	Andrew Fenn	Joshua Hargreaves
2005	Adam Blythe	Simon Lewis	Jason Crombie
2006	Tom Buck	Andrew Fenn	Tomas Skubala
2007	Daniel McLay	Christopher Whorrall	Felix English
2008	Samuel Harrison	Kian Emadi	Christopher Nicholson
2009	Robert Lambton	Declan Bryne	Owain Doull
2010	Jon Dibben	Mathew Cross	Sam Lowe
2011	Oliver Wood	Chris Lawless	Jack Hoyle
2012	Levi Moody	Fabio Close	Joe Evans
2013	Joel Partington	Joe Holt	Jack Carlin
2014	Fred Wright	Rhys Britton	Reece Wood
2015	Rhys Britton	Fred Wright	Jake Stewart
2016	Charley Calvert	Ethan Vernon	Alistair Fielding
2017	James Bunting	Leo Hayter	Lewis Askey

Female Youth

10 km scratch race
Year	Gold	Silver	Bronze
1999	Nicole Cooke	Claire Dixon	Laura Bissell
2000	Kimberley Walsh	Nicki Lloyd	Kirsteen Lawrie
2001	Katherine Hill	Rachel Ball	Kimberley Blythe
2003	Rachel Ball	Kimberley Blythe	Katie Curtis
2004	Katie Curtis	Lucy Richards	Alex Greenfield
2005	Lucy Richards	Jess Varnish	Greta Junker
2006	Alex Greenfield	Jess Varnish	Danielle King
2007	Becky James	Laura Trott	Joanne Wilman
2008	Laura Trott	Ruby Miller	Hannah Manley
2009	Hannah Barnes	Harriet Owen	Lucy Garner
2010	Emily Kay	Lucy Garner	Elinor Barker
2011	Emily Kay	Emily Nelson	Dannielle Khan
2012	Charlotte Broughton	Grace Garner	Emily Nelson
2013	Lucy Shaw	Megan Barker	Abigail Dentus
2014	Eleanor Dickinson	Jessica Roberts	Rebecca Raybould
2015	Jenny Holl	Sophie Williams	Rachel Jary
2016	Eve Martin	Anna Docherty	Ellie Russell
2017	Sophie Lewis	Elena Smith	Amy Cole
