= British National Points Championships =

British cycling national competition

The British National Points Championships are held annually as part of the British National Track Championships organised by British Cycling. A women's championship was held for the first time in 1985.

== Men's Senior Race ==
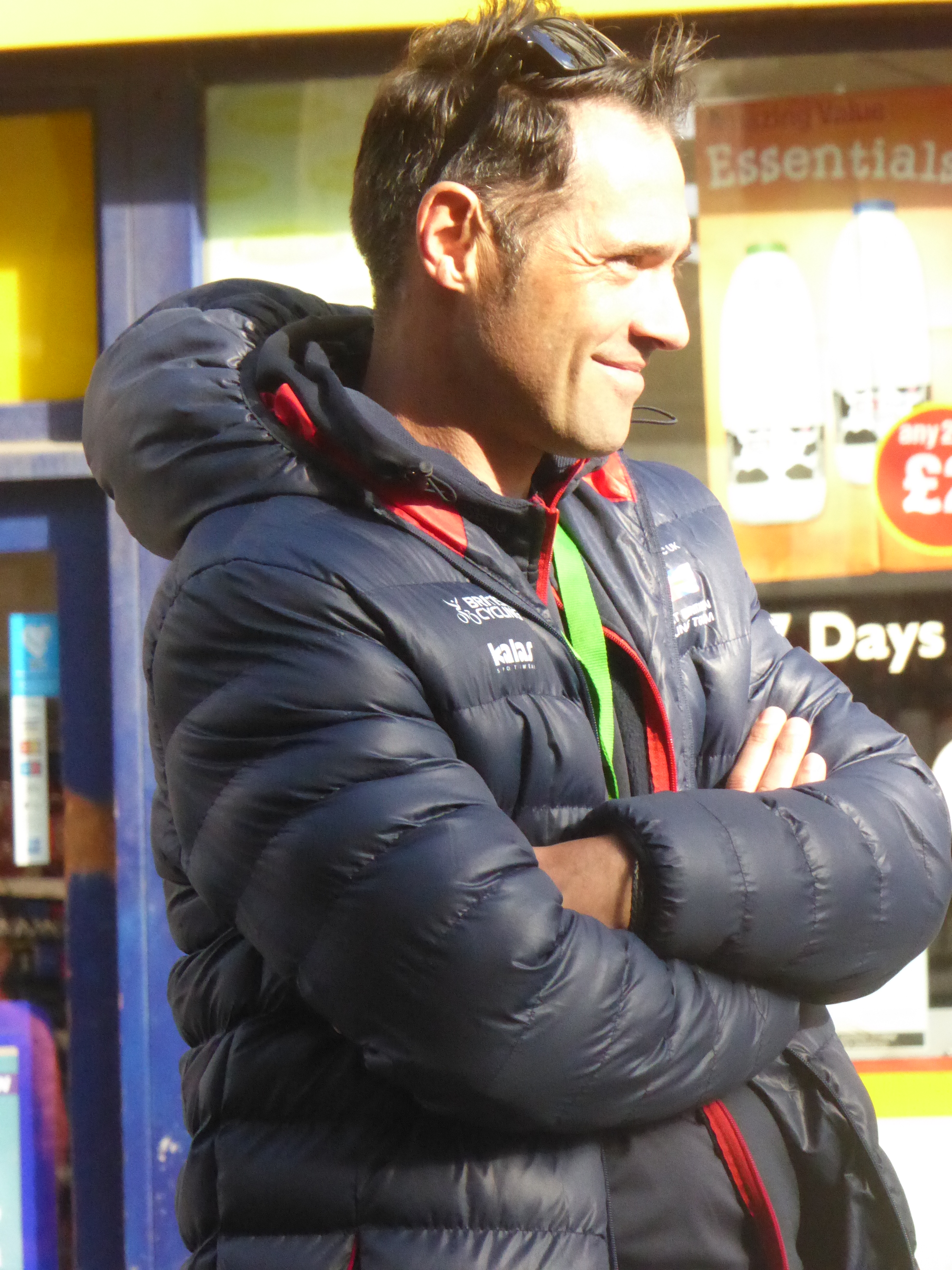
Chris Newton, five times champion

Year	Gold	Silver	Bronze	Ref
1977	Roy Crombie	Geoff Creswell	Glen Mitchell	
1978	Steve Mann	Mick Davies	Tony James	
1979	Tony Doyle	Tony James	Glen Mitchell	
1980	Glen Mitchell	Tony James	Kenny Gray	
1981	Glen Mitchell	Steve Joughin	Darryl Webster	
1982	Paul Curran	Darryl Webster	Des Fretwell	
1983	Glen Mitchell	Paul Curran		
1984	Paul Curran	Kevin Byers	Martin Webster	
1985	Paul Curran	Kevin Byers	Phil Wilkins	
1986				
1987	Alastair Wood	Paul Curran		
1988	Colin Sturgess	Simon Lillistone	Paul Curran	
1989	Simon Lillistone	Scott O'Brien	Spencer Wingrave	
1990	Simon Lillistone	Spencer Wingrave	Jeff Snodin	
1991	Simon Lillistone	Ray Hughes	Darryl Webster	
1992	Simon Lillistone	Bryan Steel	Adrian Allen	
1993	Simon Lillistone	Spencer Wingrave	Richard Craven	
1994	Simon Lillistone	Tony Doyle	Anthony Stirrat	
1995	Jon Clay	Bryan Steel	Anthony Stirrat	
1996	Rob Hayles	Russell Williams	Phil West	
1997	Rob Hayles	Jon Clay	Phil West	
1998	Rob Hayles	Jon Clay	James Notley	
1999	Rob Hayles	Huw Pritchard	Christopher Ball	
2000	Tony Gibb	Kieran Page	Ross Muir	
2001	Rob Hayles	James Taylor	Tony Gibb	
2002	Chris Newton	Bryan Steel	Russell Downing	
2003	Russell Downing	Ben Hallam	Dominic Hill	
2004	Chris Newton	Keiran Page	Dean Downing	
2005	Paul Manning	Dean Downing	Kieran Page	
2006	Ross Sander	Evan Oliphant	Peter Kennaugh	
2007	Chris Newton	Ben Swift	Jonathan Bellis	
2008	Chris Newton	Mark McNally	Jonathan Mould	
2009	Chris Newton	Andy Tennant	Jonathan Mould	
2010	George Atkins	Simon Yates	Mark Christian	
2011	Peter Kennaugh	Jon Mould	Mark Christian	
2012	George Atkins	Owain Doull	Zachery May	
2013	Ed Clancy	Sam Harrison	Jacob Ragan	
2014	Mark Stewart	Mark Christian	Jonathan Mould	
2015	Oliver Wood	Mark Stewart	Christopher Latham	
2017	Joseph Nally	Ethan Hayter	Zachery May	
2018	John Archibald	Ethan Hayter	Fred Wright	
2019	Rhys Britton	Matthew Walls	Kyle Gordon	
2020	Rhys Britton	William Roberts	William Perrett	
2021 not held due to COVID-19
2022	Joshua Tarling	Oscar Nilsson-Julien	John Archibald	
2023	William Perrett	William Tidball	Josh Charlton	
2024	William Perrett	Will Roberts	Noah Hobbs	
2025	William Perrett	Henry Hobbs	Ben Wiggins	
2026	Ben Marsh	Charlie Tanfield	Ben Wiggins	

== Women's Senior Race ==
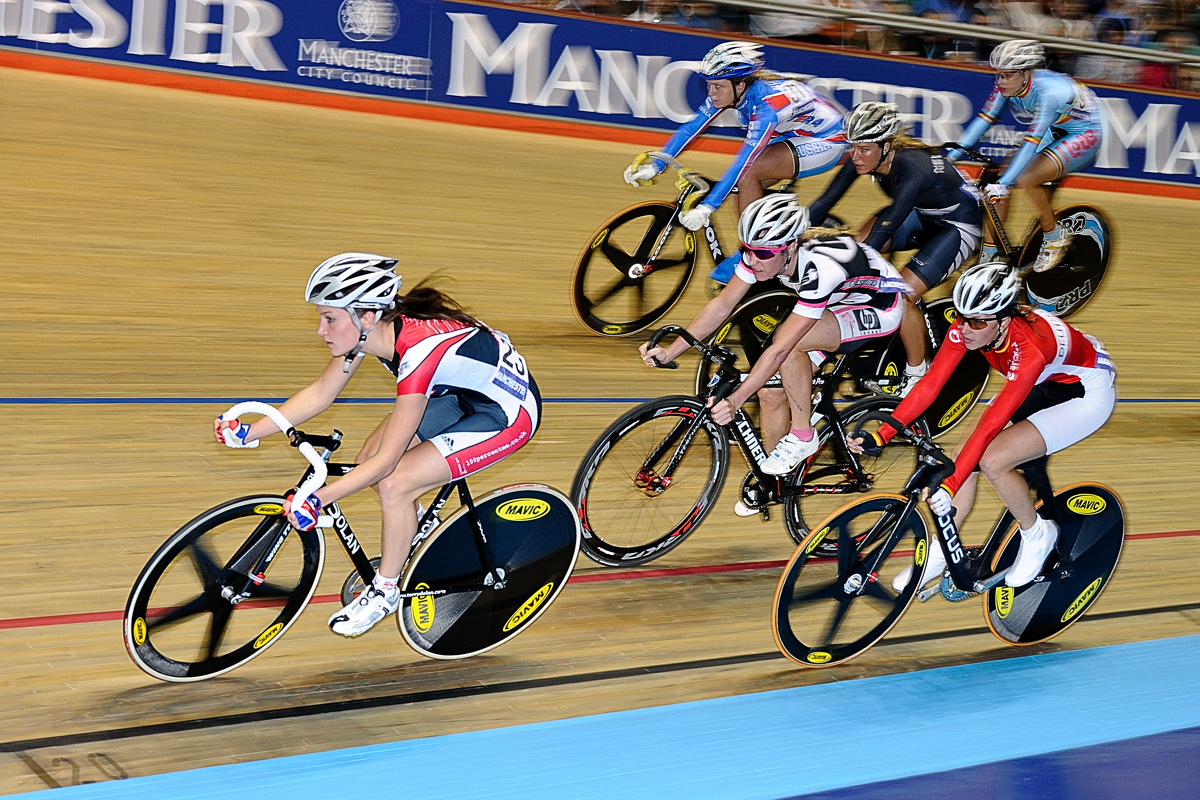
Lizzie Armitstead in action during the 2008 points race

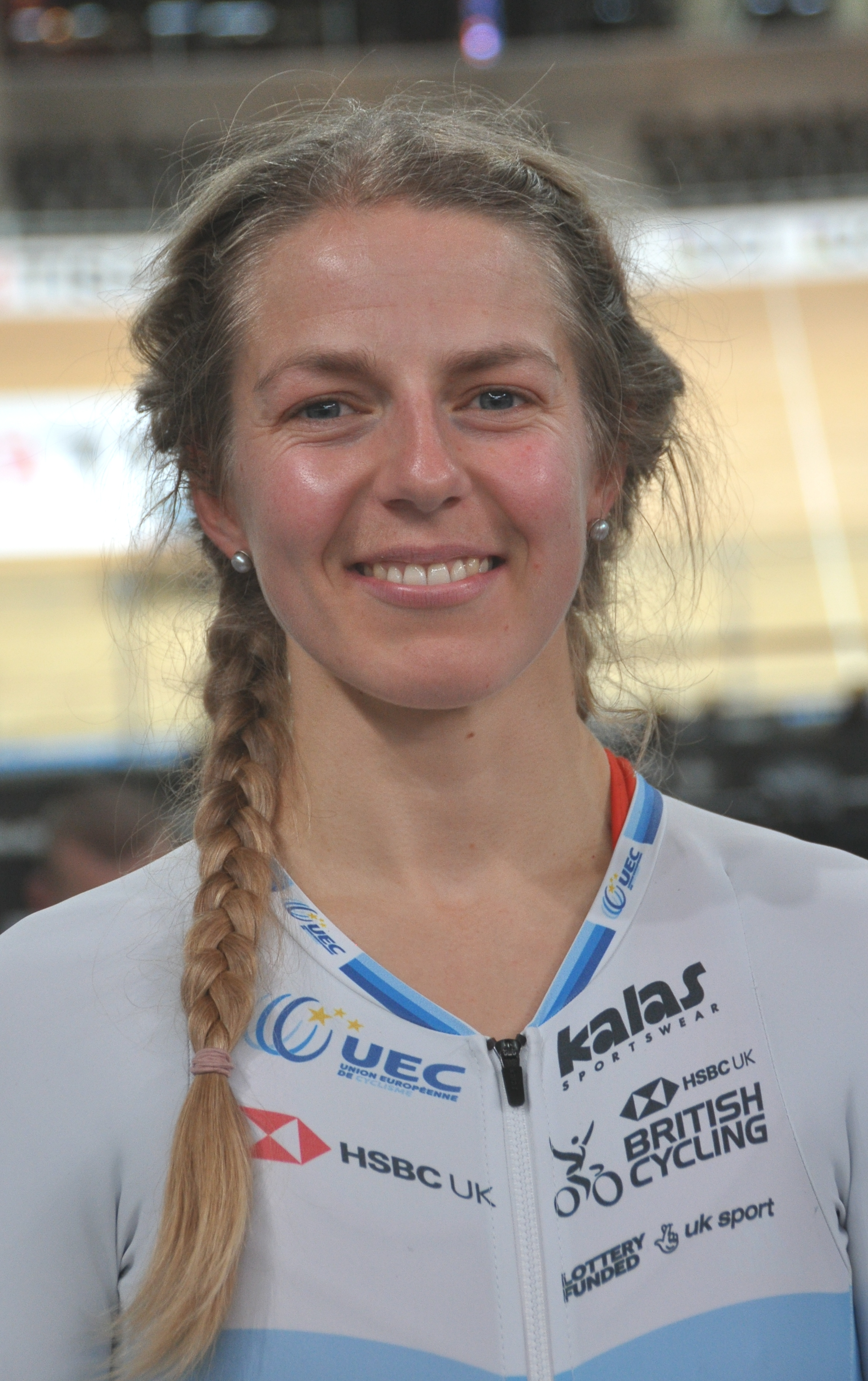
Neah Evans

Year	Gold	Silver	Bronze	Ref
1984		Jackie Harris		
1985	Theresa Dark	Jackie Harris	Caroline Schouten	
1986	Louise Jones			
1987	Sally Hodge	Louise Jones	Jackie Harris	
1988	Sally Hodge	Carole Langley	Jackie Harris	
1989	Louise Jones	Maxine Johnson	Sally McKenzie-Hodge	
1990	Sally Dawes	Sharon Beech	Maxine Johnson	
1991	Sally Hodge	Louise Jones	Sally Dawes	
1992	Sally Hodge	Sally Dawes	Rachelle Jones	
1993	Sally Hodge	Maxine Johnson	Sally Timmis	
1994	Sally Hodge	Sally Dawes	Maria Lawrence	
1995	Sally Boyden	Maria Lawrence	Vikki Filsell	
1996	Sally Boyden	Wendy Everson	Angela Hunter	
1997	Sally Boyden	Michelle Ward	Maxine Johnson	
1998	Sally Boyden	Melanie Szubrycht	Michelle Ward	
1999	Sally Boyden	Michelle Ward	Emma Davies	
2000	Frances Newstead	Angela Hunter	Sally Boyden	
2001	Angela Hunter	Rachel Heal	Victoria Pendleton	
2002	Angela Hunter	Sally Boyden	Laura Bissell	
2003	Emma Davies	Rachel Heal	Victoria Pendleton	
2004	Emma Davies	Katie Cullen	Rachel Heal	
2005	Nicole Cooke	Katie Cullen	Nikki Harris	
2006	Katie Cullen	Alex Greenfield	Katie Curtis	
2007	Katie Cullen	Katie Curtis	Joanna Rowsell	
2008	Alex Greenfield	Katie Colclough	Ella Sadler-Andrews	
2009	Lizzie Armitstead	Hannah Mayho	Dani King	
2010	Corrine Hall	Dani King	Anna Blyth	
2011	Lizzie Armitstead	Laura Trott	Joanna Rowsell	
2012	Corrine Hall	Charline Joiner	Hannah Barnes	
2013	Laura Trott	Dani King	Elinor Barker	
2014	Sarah Storey	Elinor Barker	Laura Trott	
2015	Laura Trott	Katie Archibald	Emily Kay	
2017	Katie Archibald	Emily Nelson	Neah Evans	
2018	Katie Archibald	Emily Kay	Jessica Roberts	
2019	Neah Evans	Emily Nelson	Katie Archibald	
2020	Anna Shackley	Jenny Holl	Sophie Lewis	
2021 not held due to COVID-19
2022	Neah Evans	Jenny Holl	Anna Morris	
2023	Neah Evans	Madelaine Leech	Sophie Lewis	
2024	Jenny Holl	Kate Richardson	Frankie Hall	
2025	Katie Archibald	Dannielle Watkinson	Cat Ferguson	
2026	Anna Morris	Josie Knight	Katie Archibald	

== Junior ==
Extended content

Men's Junior Race

Year	Gold	Silver	Bronze
30 km Points Race
1977	Saun Fenwick	Ian Fagan	Russell Williams
1980			Richard Stevely
1987	Simon Lillistone		
1992	Richard Bruce	Andrew Mummery	Steve Kennedy
1993	Andrew Mummery		
1994	James Taylor	Andrew Mummery	
1995	Phil West		
1997	Bradley Wiggins	Steve Cummings	Oliver Sutcliffe
1998	Bradley Wiggins	Mark Kelly	Ben Hallam
1999	Richard Teare	Craig Sellen	David Heaven
2000	Richard Teare	Kristian Story	Henry Cole
2001	Tom White	Mark Cavendish	Adam Duggleby
2003	Ed Clancy	Geraint Thomas	Andrew Hill
2004	Ben Swift	Ross Sander	Andrew Hill
2005	Ian Stannard	Russell Hampton	Steven Burke
2006	Peter Kennaugh	Adam Blythe	Russell Hampton
2007	Peter Kennaugh	Michael Webb	Adam Blythe
2008	Mark Christian	Jonathan Mould	Erick Rowsell
2009	Daniel McLay	George Atkins	Jonathan Mould
2010	Owain Doull	Simon Yates	Declan Byrne
2011	Owain Doull	Tao Geoghegan Hart	Jon Dibben
2012	Christopher Latham	Samuel Lowe	Tristan Robbins
2013	Christopher Lawless	Gabriel Cullaigh	Joe Evans
2014	Tristan Robbins	Matthew Gibson	Joe Evans
2015	Matthew Walls	Tom England	Andy Brown
2016	Matthew Walls	Jake Stewart	Rhys Britton
2017	Ethan Vernon	Fred Wright	Matthew Shaw

Women's Junior Race

Year	Gold	Silver	Bronze
15 km points race
2002	Jacqui Marshall	Kimberley Walsh	Kathryn McClelland
2003	Nikki Harris	Jenny Middlehurst	Kathryn McClelland
2004	Amy Hunt	Jo Tindley	Kimberley Blythe
2005	Lizzie Armitstead	Katie Curtis	Jo Tindley
2006	Katie Curtis	Lizzie Armitstead	Lara Wann
2007	Jessica Allen	Corrine Hall	Lucy Martin
2008	Katie Colclough	Lucy Martin	Corrine Hall
2009	Hannah Rich	Laura Trott	Ruby Miller
2010	Laura Trott	Emily Kay	Elinor Barker
2011	Hannah Barnes	Lucy Garner	Elinor Barker
2012	Lucy Garner	Katie Archibald	Amy Hill
2013	Amy Hill	Emily Kay	Hayley Jones
2014	Grace Garner	Emily Nelson	Bethany Hayward
2015	Rebecca Raybould	Lucy Shaw	Abbie Dentus
2016	Charlotte Cole-Hossain	Jessica Roberts	Eleanor Dickinson
2017	Lauren Dolan	Rachel Jary	Ellie Russell

== Youth ==
Extended content

Male Youth Race

Year	Gold	Silver	Bronze
15 km Points Race
1995	Bradley Wiggins	Stephen MacMillan	
1996	Mark Kelly	Oliver Sutcliffe	David Earth
1997	David Heaven	Iain Redpath	Scott Burns
1998	Nathan Harman	Iain Redpath	Richard Sutcliffe
1999	Steve Harrison	Henry Cole	Richard Sutcliffe
2000	Matthew Haynes	Tom White	Paul Riley
2001	Jason Cattermole	Geraint Thomas	Bruce Edgar
2003	Tom Smith	Kevin Barclay	Lewis Atkins
2004	Steven Burke	Simon Lewis	Kevin Barclay
2005	Simon Lewis	Adam Blythe	Peter Kennaugh
2006	Andrew Fenn	Michael Webb	Alex Aldham-Breary
2007	Samuel Harrison	Daniel McLay	Christopher Whorrall
2008	Samuel Harrison	Felix English	Simon Yates
2009	Owain Doull	Saml Lowe	Alister Slater
2010	Jon Dibben	Christopher Latham	Christopher Lawless
2011	Chris Lawless	Tao Geoghegan-Hart	Oliver Wood
2012	Tristan Robbins	Charlie Tanfield	Leon Gledhill
2013	Joe Holt	Matthew Bostock	Joel Partington
2014	Matthew Walls	Reece Wood	Fred Wright
2015	Jake Stewart	Rhys Britton	Joe Nally
2016	William Tidball	Theo Modell	Oscar Mingay
2017	Oscar Nilsson-Julien	Leo Hayter	James Codd
2018	Oscar Nilsson-Julien	Max Poole	Robert Donaldson

Female Youth Race

Year	Gold	Silver	Bronze
15 km points race
1998	Nicole Cooke	Claire Dixon	Danielle Andrew
1999	Nicole Cooke	Claire Dixon	Laura Bissell
2000	Kimberley Walsh	Samantha Ashford	Nicki Lloyd
2001	Katherine Hill	Rachel Ball	Nicki Lloyd
2003	Kimberley Blythe	Rachel Ball	Abby Jackson
2004	Katie Curtis	Lucy Richards	Alex Greenfield
2005	Lucy Richards	Greta Junker	Tegan Millington
2006	Alex Greenfield	Hannah Rich	Greta Junker
2007	Corrine Hall	Laura Trott	Katie Fearnehough
2008	Hannah Barnes	Ruby Miller	Harriet Owen
2009	Hannah Barnes	Lucy Garner	Harriet Owen
2010	Amy Roberts	Emily Kay	Elinor Barker
2011	Emily Kay	Alice Barnes	Emily Nelson
2012	Charlotte Broughton	Bethany Hayward	Melissa Lowther
2013	Abigail Dentus	Abby-Mae Parkinson	Lucy Shaw
2014	Henrietta Colborne	Eleanor Dickinson	Jessica Roberts
2015	Jessica Roberts	Lauren Dolan	Anna Docherty
2016	Ellie Russell	Elynor Bäckstedt	Pfeiffer Georgi
2017	Zoë Bäckstedt	Elynor Bäckstedt	Amelia Sharp
