= 2002 British National Track Championships =

- Venue: Manchester, England
- Date(s): 28–31 August 2002
- Velodrome: Manchester Velodrome

The 2002 British National Track Championships were a series of track cycling competitions held from 28–31 August 2002 at the Manchester Velodrome.

== Medal summary ==
=== Men's Events ===
Event	Gold	Silver	Bronze
1 Km Time Trial	Jonathan Norfolk	Anton Quist	Barney Storey
Sprint	Andy Slater	Anton Quist	Adam Welch
Keirin	Jonathan Norfolk	James Taylor	Ben Elliott
Team sprint	Craig MacLean; Chris Hoy; Jason Queally	Anton Quist; Andy Slater; Barney Storey	Matthew Haynes; Marco Librizzi; James Taylor
Individual Pursuit	Michael Hutchinson	Kristian House	Ben Hallam
Team pursuit	Benedict Elliott; Phil West; James Notley; Jason Streather	Neil Rothwell; Stuart Wearmouth; Keith Murray; Timothy Lawson	Richard Teare; Mike Cubison; Daniel Smith; Marcus Smith
Points	Chris Newton	Bryan Steel	Russell Downing
Scratch	Russell Downing	Mark Kelly	James Taylor

=== Women's Events ===
Event	Gold	Silver	Bronze
500m time trial	Victoria Pendleton	Denise Hampson	Emily Forde
Sprint	Victoria Pendleton	Denise Hampson	Kate Cullen
Individual Pursuit	Emma Davies	Angela Hunter	Emily Forde
Points	Angela Hunter	Sally Boyden	Laura Bissell
Scratch	Angela Hunter	Sally Boyden	Lorna Webb
