= 2006 British National Track Championships =

- Venue: Manchester, England
- Date: 3–7 October 2006
- Velodrome: Manchester Velodrome

The 2006 British National Track Championships were a series of track cycling competitions held from 3–7 October 2006 at the Manchester Velodrome. They are organised and sanctioned by British Cycling, and were open to British cyclists.

== Medal summary ==
=== Men's Events ===
Event	Gold	Silver	Bronze
1 Km Time Trial	Chris Hoy	Rob Hayles	Jason Kenny
Sprint	Craig MacLean	Ross Edgar	Chris Hoy
Keirin	Ross Edgar	Matthew Crampton	Chris Hoy
Team sprint	Chris Hoy; Craig MacLean; Jason Queally	Matthew Crampton; Jamie Staff; Ross Edgar	Jason Kenny; David Daniell; Dave Le Grys
Individual Pursuit	David Millar	Paul Manning	Chris Newton
Team pursuit	Ed Clancy; Steve Cummings; Paul Manning; Chris Newton	Ross Sander; Ian Stannard; Ben Swift; Geraint Thomas	Jonathan Bellis; Peter Kennaugh; Luke Rowe; Alex Dowsett
Points	Ross Sander	Evan Oliphant	Peter Kennaugh
Scratch	Chris Newton	Kieran Page	Ian Stannard

=== Women's Events ===
Event	Gold	Silver	Bronze
500m time trial	Victoria Pendleton	Anna Blyth	Janet Birkmyre
Sprint	Victoria Pendleton	Anna Blyth	Lucy Ayres
Keirin	Victoria Pendleton	Anna Blyth	Lucy Ayres
Individual Pursuit	Rebecca Romero	Nikki Harris	Sarah Bailey
Points	Katie Cullen	Alex Greenfield	Katie Curtis
Scratch	Victoria Pendleton	Lizzie Armitstead	Laura Bissell
