= 1998 British National Track Championships =

- Venue: Manchester, England
- Date(s): 24 July – 1 August 1998
- Velodrome: Manchester Velodrome

The 1998 British National Track Championships were a series of track cycling competitions held from 24 July – 1 August 1998 at the Manchester Velodrome. The Championships were organised by the British Cycling Federation.

== Medal summary ==
=== Men's Events ===
Event	Gold	Silver	Bronze
1 Km Time Trial	Craig MacLean	Jason Queally	Chris Hoy
Sprint	Craig MacLean	Neil Campbell	Chris Hoy
Keirin	Craig Percival	Robert Darley	Richard Kennedy
Team sprint	Chris Hoy; Peter Jacques; Craig MacLean	Alan Crossland; Alwyn McMath; Matthew Fairclough	John Taylor; Alexander Sims; Peter Green
Individual Pursuit	Rob Hayles	Matt Illingworth	Jon Clay
Team pursuit	Jon Clay; Rob Hayles; Matt Illingworth; Bryan Steel	Justin Clarke; Jonathan Hargreaves; Sion Jones; Robert Wood	Richard Chapman; Neil Walker; Stephen Whitcombe; Nicholas Hall
Points	Rob Hayles	Jon Clay	James Notley
Scratch	Rob Wood	Peter Jacques	Tony Gibb
Madison	Rob Hayles; Jon Clay	Phil West; James Notley	James Taylor; Rob Wood
Derny (held at Herne Hill Velodrome)	Bryan Steel; Paul Wingrave	Russell Williams; Colin Denman	Clive Burr; Derek Marloe

=== Women's Events ===
Event	Gold	Silver	Bronze
500m time trial	Wendy Everson	Julie Forrester	Melanie Szubrycht
Sprint	Wendy Everson	Julie Forrester	Melanie Szubrycht
Individual Pursuit	Yvonne McGregor	Michelle Ward	Emma Davies
Points	Sally Boyden	Melanie Szubrycht	Michelle Ward
Scratch	Melanie Szubrycht	Sally Boyden	Angela Hunter
