= 1999 British National Track Championships =

- Venue: Manchester, England
- Date(s): 23–31 July 1999
- Velodrome: Manchester Velodrome

The 1999 British National Track Championships were a series of track cycling competitions held from 23–31 July 1999 at the Manchester Velodrome. The Championships were organised by the British Cycling Federation.

== Medal summary ==
=== Men's Events ===
| Event | Gold | Silver | Bronze |
|---|---|---|---|
| 1 Km Time Trial | Craig MacLean | Chris Hoy | Neil Campbell |
| Sprint | Craig MacLean | Craig Percival | Neil Campbell |
| Keirin | Craig Percival | Neil Campbell | Mark Whittaker |
| Team sprint | Peter Jacques; Craig MacLean; James Taylor | Andrew Slater; Mark Whittaker; David Heald | Brian Fudge; Mark Pearce; Robin Thompson |
| Individual Pursuit | Rob Hayles | Matt Illingworth | Bradley Wiggins |
| Team pursuit | Russell Downing; Matt Illingworth; Chris Newton; Julian Winn | Neil Campbell; Dean Downing; Andrew Russell; Jon Cannings | Nicky Hall; Craig MacLean; Derek Smith; James Taylor |
| Points | Rob Hayles | Huw Pritchard | Christopher Ball |
| Scratch | Huw Pritchard | Tony Gibb | James Taylor |
| Madison | Rob Hayles; Bradley Wiggins | Jon Clay; Russell Downing | Chris Bush; Dan Ellmore |
| Derny (held at Herne Hill Velodrome) | Simon Cope; Paul Wingrave | Russell Williams; Colin Denman | Rob Jefferies unknown |

=== Women's Events ===
| Event | Gold | Silver | Bronze |
|---|---|---|---|
| 500m time trial | Julie Forrester | Wendy Everson | Denise Hampson |
| Sprint | Wendy Everson | Denise Hampson | Victoria Pendleton |
| Individual Pursuit | Yvonne McGregor | Emma Davies | Sally Boyden |
| Points | Sally Boyden | Michelle Ward | Emma Davies |
| Scratch | Wendy Everson | Sally Boyden | Louise Jones |
