= 2005 British National Track Championships =

- Venue: Manchester, England
- Date: 6–9 October 2005
- Velodrome: Manchester Velodrome

The 2005 British National Track Championships were a series of track cycling competitions held from 6–9 October 2005 at the Manchester Velodrome. They are organised and sanctioned by British Cycling, and were open to British cyclists.

== Medal summary ==
=== Men's Events ===
| Event | Gold | Silver | Bronze |
|---|---|---|---|
| 1 Km Time Trial | Chris Hoy | Jonathan Norfolk | Matthew Crampton |
| Sprint | Craig MacLean | Matthew Crampton | Marco Librizzi |
| Keirin | Matthew Crampton | Dave Heald | Richard Kennedy |
| Team sprint | Joshua Hargreaves; Matthew Crampton; Jason Kenny | Benedict Elliott; David Heald; Richard Storey | Marco Librizzi; Shane Charlton; Graeme Steen |
| Individual Pursuit | Paul Manning | Rob Hayles | Michael Hutchinson |
| Team pursuit | Ed Clancy; Mark Cavendish; Steve Cummings; Geraint Thomas | Jonathan Bellis; Alex Dowsett; Russell Hampton; Matthew Rowe | Andrew Russell; Jason Streather; Benedict Elliott; Tom Walters |
| Points | Paul Manning | Dean Downing | Kieran Page |
| Scratch | Geraint Thomas | Mark Cavendish | Ben Swift |

=== Women's Events ===
| Event | Gold | Silver | Bronze |
|---|---|---|---|
| 500m time trial | Victoria Pendleton | Lorna Webb | Janet Birkmyre |
| Sprint | Victoria Pendleton | Lorna Webb | Janet Birkmyre |
| Keirin | Victoria Pendleton | Lucy Richards | Katie Curtis |
| Individual Pursuit | Wendy Houvenaghel | Rachel Heal | Katrina Hair |
| Points | Nicole Cooke | Katie Cullen | Nikki Harris |
| Scratch | Victoria Pendleton | Rachel Heal | Nicole Cooke |
