= 1997 British National Track Championships =

Series of track cycling competitions

- Venue: Manchester, England
- Date(s): 18–26 July 1997
- Velodrome: Manchester Velodrome

The 1997 British National Track Championships were a series of track cycling competitions held from 18 to 26 July 1997 at the Manchester Velodrome. The Championships were organised by the British Cycling Federation.

== Medal summary ==
=== Men's Events ===
Event	Gold	Silver	Bronze
1 km Time Trial	Craig MacLean	Jason Queally	Chris Hoy
Sprint	Craig MacLean	Neil Campbell	Peter Jacques
Keirin	Peter Jacques	Rob Jefferies	Alwyn McMath
Team sprint	City of Edinburgh RC; Chris Hoy; Peter Jacques; Craig MacLean	Glendene CC; Neil Campbell	CC Lancashire
Individual Pursuit	Rob Hayles	Bryan Steel	Jon Clay
Team pursuit	Harlow CC; Chris Ball; Adam Dallison; Matt Illingworth; Sion Jones	City of Edinburgh; Craig MacLean; Chris Hoy; Scott McWilliam; Steve Whitcome; Richard Chapman; Neil Walker	Cwmcarn Paragon
Points	Rob Hayles	Jon Clay	Phil West
Scratch	Craig MacLean	Jon Clay	James Notley
Madison	Rob Hayles; Russell Williams	Jon Clay; Bryan Steel	Jonathan Hargreaves; James Notley
Derny (held at Herne Hill Velodrome)	Bryan Steel; Paul Wingrave	Russell Williams; Colin Denman	Keith Reid; Derek Marloe

=== Women's Events ===
Event	Gold	Silver	Bronze
500m time trial	Wendy Everson	Sally Boyden	Michelle Ward
Sprint	Wendy Everson	Michelle Ward	Megan Hughes
Individual Pursuit	Yvonne McGregor	Sally Boyden	Michelle Ward
Points	Sally Boyden	Michelle Ward	Maxine Johnson
Scratch	Michelle Ward	Sally Boyden	Wendy Everson
