= Abbie Dentus =

British cyclist

- Dentus in 2018

Personal information
- Full name: Abigail Louise Dentus
- Born: 3 May 1997 (age 29)
- Height: 5 ft 6 in (168 cm)

Cycling career
- Sport: Cycling
- Disciplines: Track; Road
- Role: Rider
- Rider type: Endurance (track)

Amateur teams
- 2013-2015: De Ver Cycles and Team Velosport–Pasta Montegrappa
- 2016–2018: Team Breeze
- 2019: Brother UK–Tifosi

Professional teams
- 2015-2018: Team GB
- 2019: Brother UK–Tifosi

Abigail Louise Dentus (born 3 May 1997) is a British track and road cyclist. Abbie represented Team GB on the road and track. Who then retired in 2020 after a series of concussions and injuries.

== Major results ==
2013
National Youth Track Championships

1st Points race
3rd Individual pursuit
3rd Madison (with Lucy Shaw)
3rd Scratch
1st Crystal Palace
1st Preston Park Omnium
1st Welwyn Wheelers Youth Omnium
1st Bordeaux Paris Track Meeting (Women's 10 lap Scratch)
1st Bordeaux Paris Track Meeting (Women's Keirin Final)
8th Hillingdon GP

 Tour Of Britain

2014
10th RideLondon Grand Prix

1st Dave Creasy Memorial Six (Women's Omnium)
5th The Ryedale Women's Grand Prix Women's Junior Road Race Championship
1st Crystal Palace Crits 9 (E/1/2/3/4)
1st Crystal Palace Crits 5 (E/1/2/3/4)
3rd Hillingdon GP (E/1/2/3)

2015

8th Junior European Championships Individual Pursuit

Le Saymn Des Dames 1.2

14th Trofee Maarten Wynants (1.2)
8th New Zealand, Cambridge World Cup Team pursuit
10th Tour De Yorkshire

::19 Energiewachttour Junior Women 3 day stage race

14 Energiewachttour Junior Women 3 day stage race
11Energiewachttour Junior Women 3 day stage race
9th Wielerweekend Munstergeleen (NAT) 4 day stage race
14th Wielerweekend Munstergeleen (NAT)4 day stage race
13th Wielerweekend Munstergeleen (NAT)4 day stage race
13th Wielerweekend Munstergeleen (NAT)4 day stage race

2016

1st Dublin Track International Omnium 1st Dublin Track International Scratch Tour De Yorkshire - DNF crashed last 27km on Final stage

1st Revolutions Cycling Series Scratch race

Lotto Belgium Tour (2.1) Prudential Ride London Grand Prix WE (1.WWT) Internationale Thüringen Rundfahrt der Frauen (2.1)

8th Energiewacht Tour (2.2) Individual TT

Pajot Hills Classic (1.2) Dwars Door Vlaanderen / A travers la Flandre WE (NAT) Le Samyn des Dames (1.2) Omloop van het Hageland - Tielt-Winge (1.1) Omloop Het Nieuwsblad WE (1.1)

2nd Individual pursuit
3rd Points race

10th Women's Tour de Yorkshire

4th Alexandra Women's Tour of the Reservoir 2-Day (Stage 1 - Kermesse)

2017

1st British National Derny Championships

2nd Madison, National Track Championships (with Rebecca Raybould)

Manchester World Cup Team Pursuit

5th Oostduinkerke Belgium

Trofee Maarten Wynants (1.1)

29th EPZ Omloop van Borsele (1.1)

Healthy Ageing Tour (2.2) 5 day stage race Pajot Hills Classic (1.2) Dwars Door Vlaanderen / A travers la Flandre WE (1.1)

2018
1st Team pursuit, National Track Championships
2nd Team pursuit, UEC European Under-23 Track Championships

SPAR Flanders Diamond Tour (1.1)

27th Dwars door de Westhoek (1.1)
5th Oostduinkerke (W) - 1.15A Dames (Elite Women)

Tour de Yorkshire Womens Race (2.1) 3 day stage race Festival Elsy Jacobs (2.1) Six Day Series - London

2nd British National Derby Championships
1st Lovelo Cinelli 115km Road race
10th Lincoln GP
3rd Tour series Motherwell
1st Tour Series Overall team winner
1st Oakley Women's Team Series
1st Farnham Town Center Crit
5th Bitish National Crit race championships
1st Dave Creasy6

2019

Six Day Series -Melbourne Six Day Series -Hong Kong Six Day Series -Manchester

1st Thundercrit Fixie race
1st Tour Series overal winners
7th British National ITT Championships
1st ISHQ Fixie Crit and overal team winner

De Brabantse Pijl - La Flèche Brabançonne WE (1.1)

3rd Thundercrit fixie crit
10th Guildford Town Centre Races 2019 (Womens Criterium)
2nd Condor Good Friday Racing 2019 (Womens Omnium Overall)
