= 2007 British National Track Championships =

- Venue: Manchester, England
- Date: 2–6 October 2007
- Velodrome: Manchester Velodrome

The 2007 British National Track Championships were a series of track cycling competitions held from 2–6 October 2007 at the Manchester Velodrome. They are organised and sanctioned by British Cycling, and were open to British cyclists.

== Medal summary ==
=== Men's Events ===
Event	Gold	Silver	Bronze
1 km Time Trial	Jamie Staff	Ed Clancy	Jason Kenny
Sprint	Ross Edgar	Chris Hoy	Matthew Crampton
Keirin	Matthew Crampton	Ross Edgar	Chris Hoy
Team sprint	Chris Hoy; Marco Librizzi; Ross Edgar	Jason Kenny; Christian Lyte; David Daniell	Jonathan Norfolk; Gwyn Carless; Anthony Gill
Individual Pursuit	Paul Manning	Ed Clancy	Jonathan Bellis
Team pursuit	Russell Hampton; Jonathan Bellis; Andy Tennant; Steven Burke	Christopher Richardson; Joel Stewart; Adam Duggleby; John McClelland	Alan Peet; Richard Prince; Jason Streather; Ian Cooper; Benedict Elliott
Points	Chris Newton	Ben Swift	Jonathan Bellis
Scratch	Steven Burke	Chris Newton	Peter Kennaugh

=== Women's Events ===
Event	Gold	Silver	Bronze
500m time trial	Victoria Pendleton	Anna Blyth	Jessica Varnish
Sprint	Victoria Pendleton	Anna Blyth	Jess Varnish
Keirin	Victoria Pendleton	Anna Blyth	Helen Scott
Individual Pursuit	Wendy Houvenaghel	Rebecca Romero	Joanna Rowsell
Points	Katie Cullen	Katie Curtis	Joanna Rowsell
Scratch	Katie Cullen	Janet Birkmyre	Katie Curtis
