= Angela Hunter =

Angela Hunter may refer to:

- Angela Hunter (cyclist) (born 1972), British cyclist
- Angela Hunter (Green Wing)
