= 2008 British National Track Championships =

- Venue: Manchester, England
- Date(s): 16–20 September 2008
- Velodrome: Manchester Velodrome

The 2008 British National Track Championships were a series of track cycling competitions held from 16–20 September 2008 at the Manchester Velodrome. They are organised and sanctioned by British Cycling, and were open to British cyclists.

== Medal summary ==
=== Men's Events ===
| Event | Gold | Silver | Bronze |
|---|---|---|---|
| 1 Km Time Trial | Matthew Crampton | Steven Burke | David Daniell |
| Sprint | David Daniell | Christian Lyte | Matthew Crampton |
| Keirin | Matthew Crampton | Craig MacLean | Christian Lyte |
| Team sprint | Chris Hoy; Craig MacLean; Jason Queally | Matthew Crampton; Jamie Staff; Ross Edgar | Jason Kenny; David Daniell; Dave Le Grys |
| Individual Pursuit | Steven Burke | Rob Hayles | Michael Hutchinson |
| Team pursuit | Christopher Richardson; Joel Stewart; Jonathan Mould; John McClelland; James Boyman | Alan Peet; Thomas Price; Jason Streather; Ian Cooper; Benedict Elliott | Martin Osman; George Bate; Jack Hibberd; Ben Stockdale |
| Points | Chris Newton | Mark McNally | Jonathan Mould |
| Scratch | Chris Newton | Andrew Magnier | Jonathan Mould |

=== Women's Events ===
| Event | Gold | Silver | Bronze |
|---|---|---|---|
| 500m time trial | Anna Blyth | Helen Scott | Alison Chisholm |
| Sprint | Victoria Pendleton | Anna Blyth | Helen Scott |
| Keirin | Victoria Pendleton | Anna Blyth | Jess Varnish |
| Team sprint | Anna Blyth; Victoria Pendleton | Helen Scott; Jess Varnish | Charline Joiner; Jenny Davis |
| Individual Pursuit | Sarah Storey | Emma Trott | Lynn Hamel |
| Points | Alexandra Greenfield | Katie Colclough | Ella Sadler-Andrews |
| Scratch | Hannah Rich | Alexandra Greenfield | Lucy Martin |
