= Glen Mitchell (British cyclist) =

British cyclist

Personal information
- Born: 11 May 1958 (age 68) Lambeth, London, England

Cycling career
- Sport: Cycling

Amateur team
- 1977-83: 34 Nomads

Professional teams
- 1984: Ever Ready Marlboro
- 1985-87: Percy Bilton Condor
Medal record
Cycling
Representing England
Commonwealth Games
Bronze medal – third place	1978 Edmonton	team pursuit

Glen Ronald Mitchell (born 11 May 1958) is a retired British cyclist. He competed in the team pursuit event at the 1980 Summer Olympics.

== Cycling career ==
In addition to his Olympic Games representation he also represented England and won a bronze medal in the 4,000 metres team pursuit, at the 1978 Commonwealth Games in Edmonton, Alberta, Canada.

Mitchell is a 10 times British track champion, winning the British National Omnium Championships in 1986, the British National Team Pursuit Championships in 1977 & 1979, the British National Madison Championships in 1977 & 1979, the British National Points Championships in 1980, 1981 & 1983 and the British National Scratch Championships in 1977 & 1981.
