= Lucy Martin (cyclist) =

British cyclist

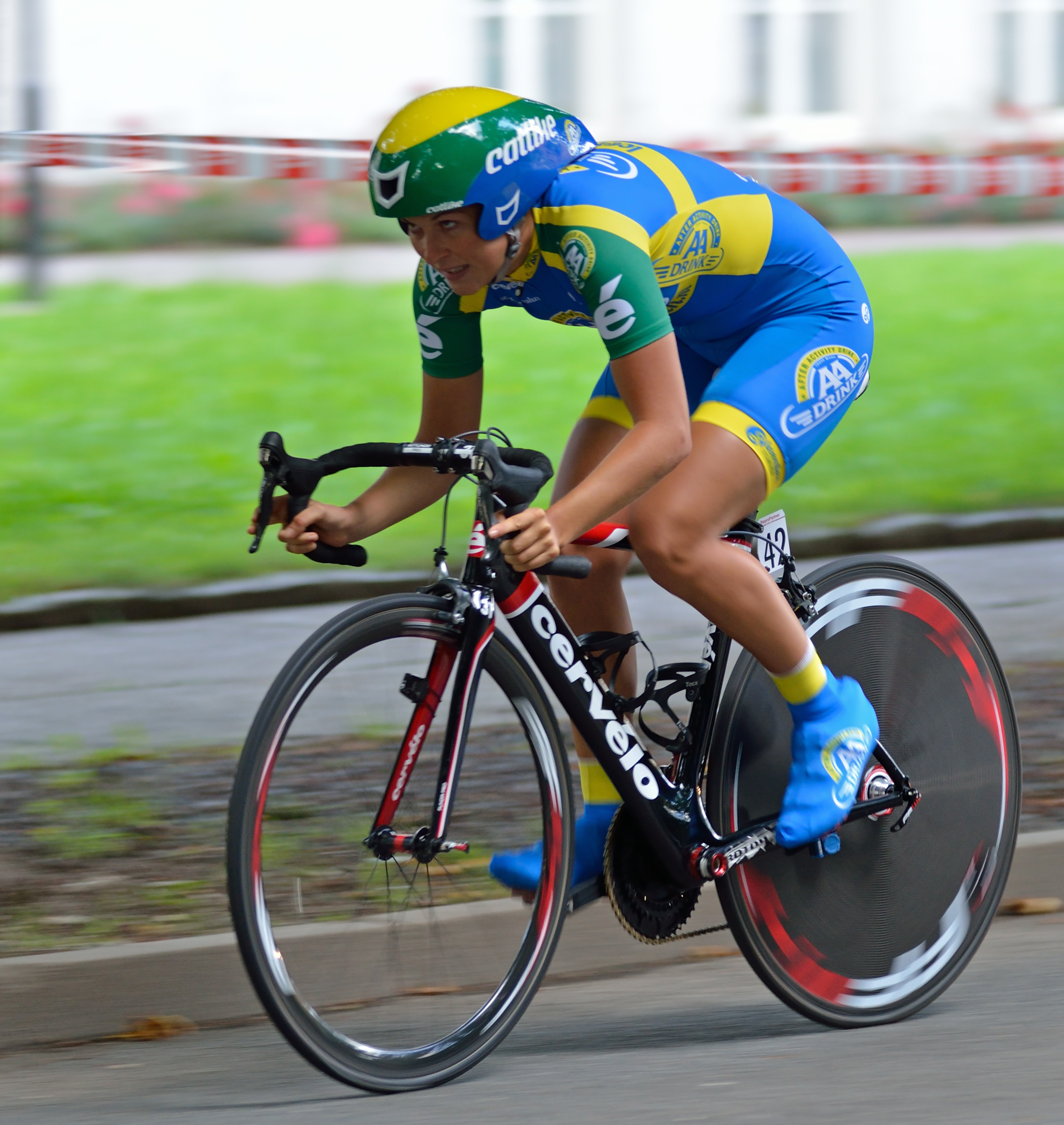
- Martin in the time trial stage of the 2012 Thüringen Rundfahrt der Frauen

Personal information
- Born: 5 May 1990 (age 36) Whiston, Merseyside, England, United Kingdom

Cycling career
- Sport: Cycling
- Current team: Retired
- Disciplines: Road; Track
- Role: Rider

Amateur team
- 2008–2010: Team 100% ME

Professional teams
- 2011: Garmin–Cervélo
- 2012: AA Drink–leontien.nl
- 2013: Boels–Dolmans
- 2014: Estado de México–Faren Kuota
- 2015: Matrix Fitness Pro Cycling

Lucy Martin (born 5 May 1990) is a British retired professional road and track cyclist.

== Career ==
Martin was born in Whiston, Merseyside and grew up in Widnes, Cheshire where she attended Riverside College. She was spotted by British Cycling's Olympic Talent Team at the age of 15, and later moved on to their under-23 Olympic Academy Programme, which rode as Team 100% ME.

In 2011, Martin was signed by the Garmin–Cervélo women's team as one of four British riders. Following the disbandment of that team, she was one of six of their riders, including all four British riders, picked up by AA Drink–leontien.nl for the 2012 season. She competed at the 2012 Summer Olympics in the Women's road race.

In August 2015 Martin announced her immediate retirement from competition. She subsequently joined Orica–GreenEDGE from 2016, working on the team's digital content and PR, and she also works as a commentator on professional cycling.

== Major results ==
2007
National Junior Track Championships

2nd Individual pursuit
3rd Points race
3rd Scratch

2008
1st Road race, National Junior Road Championships
2nd Points race, 2008–09 UCI Track Cycling World Cup Classics, Manchester
2nd Points race, National Junior Track Championships
3rd Scratch, National Track Championships
2009
6th Sparkassen Giro Bochum
2010
8th Drentse 8 van Dwingeloo
9th Overall Trophée d'Or Féminin
2011
2nd Road race, National Under-23 Road Championships
10th Overall Tour of Chongming Island Stage race
2012
8th Tour of Chongming Island World Cup
9th Omloop van het Hageland
2013
7th Knokke-Heist – Bredene
2015
5th Trofee Maarten Wynants
