= Michelle Ward =

British cyclist (born 1976)

Personal information
- Born: 2 August 1976 (age 50) Aldershot, Hampshire, England, UK

Cycling career
- Sport: Cycling
- Disciplines: Road and track
- Role: Rider

Major wins
- British Champion

Michelle Ward (born 1976) is a female former British international track and road racing cyclist.

== Cycling career ==
Ward became British champion in 1997 after winning the British National Scratch Championships at the 1997 British National Track Championships.

She represented England in the points race on the track, at the 1998 Commonwealth Games in Kuala Lumpur, Malaysia.

== Palmarès ==
1997

- 1st Scratch, 1997 British National Track Championships
- 2nd Sprint, 1997 British National Track Championships
- 2nd Points, 1997 British National Track Championships
- 3rd Time Trial, 1997 British National Track Championships

1998

- 2nd Pursuit, 1998 British National Track Championships
- 3rd Points, 1998 British National Track Championships

1999

- 2nd Points, 1999 British National Track Championships
