= Ben Swift =

British racing cyclist

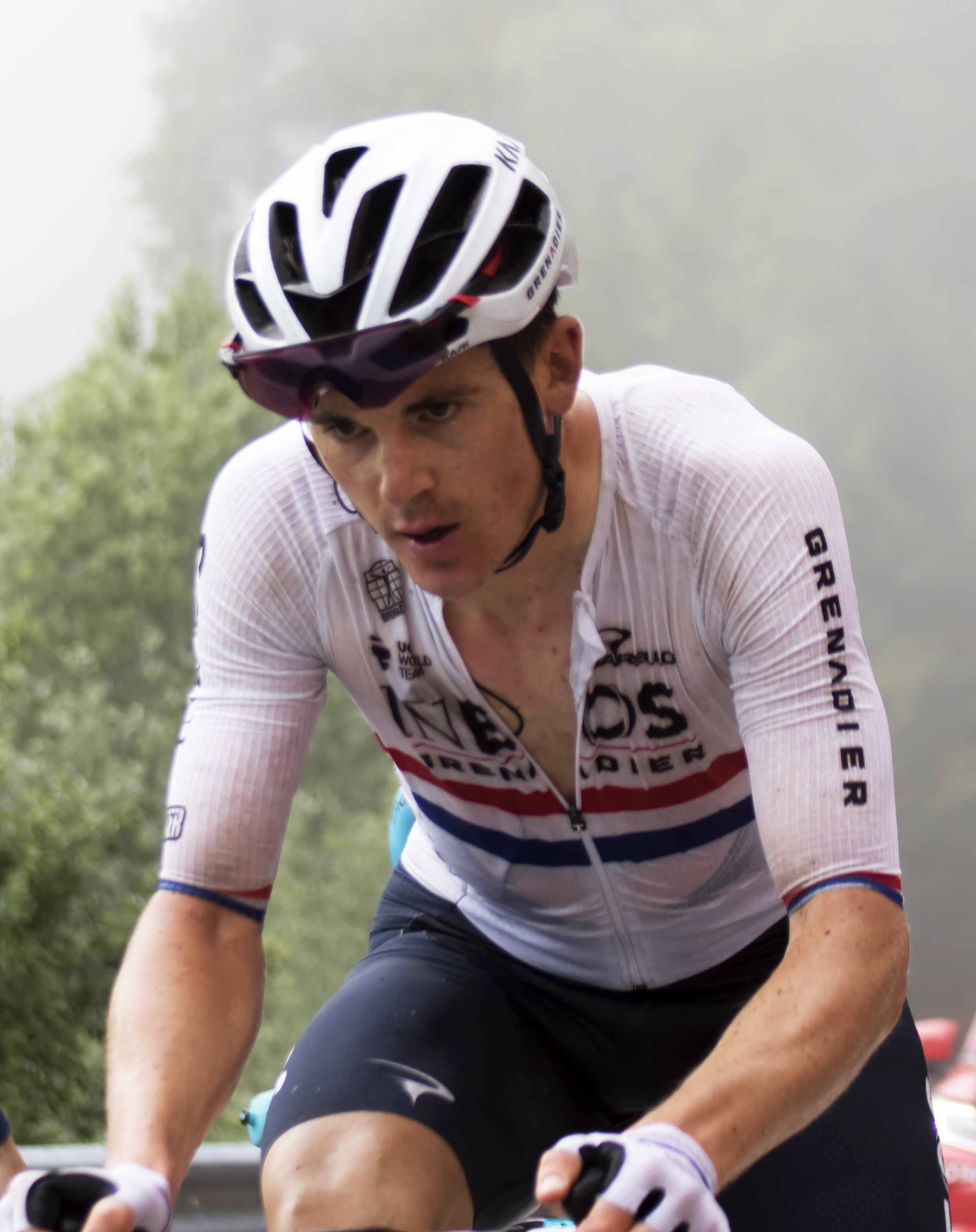
- Swift at the 2022 Giro d'Italia

Personal information
- Full name: Benjamin John Swift
- Nickname: Swifty
- Born: 5 November 1987 (age 38) Rotherham, England, United Kingdom
- Height: 1.79 m (5 ft 10 in)
- Weight: 69 kg (152 lb)

Cycling career
- Sport: Cycling
- Current team: Netcompany–Ineos
- Disciplines: Road; Track
- Role: Rider
- Rider type: Sprinter, Domestique

Amateur teams
- 1999–?: Ashfield RC
- ?: Mossley CRT
- ?: Scunthorpe Poly CC
- ?–2000: Kinesis
- 2007–2008: Recycling.co.uk
- Autumn 2007: 100% Me
- 2007: Barloworld (stagiaire)

Professional teams
- 2009: Team Katusha
- 2010–2016: Team Sky
- 2017–2018: UAE Abu Dhabi
- 2019–: Team Sky

Major wins
- Road One-day races and Classics National Road Race Championships (2019, 2021) Track World Championships Scratch (2012)
Medal record
Men's track cycling
Representing Great Britain
World Championships
Gold medal – first place	2012 Melbourne	Scratch
Silver medal – second place	2010 Ballerup	Team pursuit
Silver medal – second place	2012 Melbourne	Points race
Silver medal – second place	2012 Melbourne	Madison

Benjamin John Swift (born 5 November 1987) was a British professional track and road racing cyclist, who last rode for UCI WorldTeam Netcompany–Ineos. Swift won the scratch race at the 2012 UCI Track Cycling World Championships and the men's elite road race at the 2019 and 2021 British National Road Race Championships. He represented Isle of Man internationally since 2022.

== Biography ==
Swift was born in Rotherham, South Yorkshire, he began cycling with Mossley Cycle Racing Team aged 12. In 2003, he came second to fellow Olympian Steven Burke in the under 16 national scratch race championship. As a junior rider, Swift competed at the Junior Commonwealth Games, taking bronze in the points race, he won two national titles, the junior points race championship in 2004 followed by the junior scratch race in 2005. He also competed in the senior scratch race in 2005, demonstrating his ability by finishing third to take the bronze medal. Swift began competing internationally, winning several madison events. In 2012 he won the World Championship Men's Scratch Race, becoming Great Britain's first ever World Scratch Champion.

== Professional career ==
He made his professional road debut in August 2007 joining Barloworld as a trainee during which time he won the King of the Mountains title in the Tour of Britain.

During 2008 he raced for the British Cycling development team and won his first UCI ranked race. He represented Great Britain in the 2008 Olympic Games road race and at the UCI Road World Championships where he finished fourth in the under 23 race.

=== Katusha ===
After the championships he signed a two-year professional contract with the new Russian Team Katusha.

In 2009 he was selected to ride the Giro d'Italia, taking a third-place finish in stage 2. He took his first professional win on the seventh stage of the Tour of Britain, leading Katusha teammate Filippo Pozzato in a one-two finish. Swift spoke with Cyclingnews.com in 2009, describing himself as "an allrounder, who can do well in the Classics and win stages. 'My weakness is in the time trial. I don't like doing them and I'm not really that good at them.'"

=== Team Sky ===
Swift joined the newly formed British-based Team Sky in January 2010. His transfer to Sky from Team Katusha part way through his contract was instrumental in the Union Cycliste Internationale considering new regulations for the transfer of riders between teams. During his first season with Sky Swift's most significant result came at the Tour de Picardie, at which he won one stage, the general classification, the points classification and best young rider.

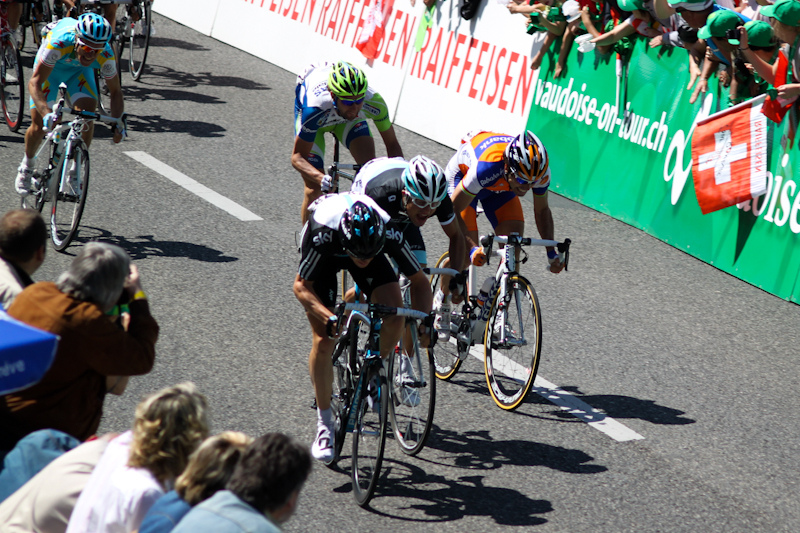
Swift (leading) at the 2011 Tour de Romandie, where he won the fifth stage.

2011 saw Swift win his first stage of a UCI World Tour race, winning stage two of the Tour Down Under in Adelaide. Four days later he also won stage six. Swift won Stage 2 of the Tour of California, and took the lead of the race, after Stage 1 was cancelled due to adverse weather. Swift was selected for the Tour de France ahead of Greg Henderson, and finished 6th on Stage 15.

In 2012 Swift focused on track cycling with a view to representing Great Britain in the 2012 Olympic Games. On 4 April, Swift won the Scratch Race at the World Championships to take the rainbow jersey. He finished second in the points race, and joined forces with Geraint Thomas to take silver in the madison.

Swift was scheduled to ride the Giro d'Italia, but was forced to withdraw after suffering a broken shoulder in a crash during a training ride the week before. Although he failed to gain selection from the long list for the British Olympic team, he was picked for the Team Sky squad for the Tour de Pologne, winning the second and fifth stages, as well as wearing that Tour's red-and-white points classification jersey Swift was selected as Sky's sprinter at the 2012 Vuelta a España, and finished second on Stage 18.

In March 2014, Swift achieved one of his biggest results to date by finishing third in Milan–San Remo. In April 2015, Swift crashed out of the newly created Tour de Yorkshire, injuring his shoulder.

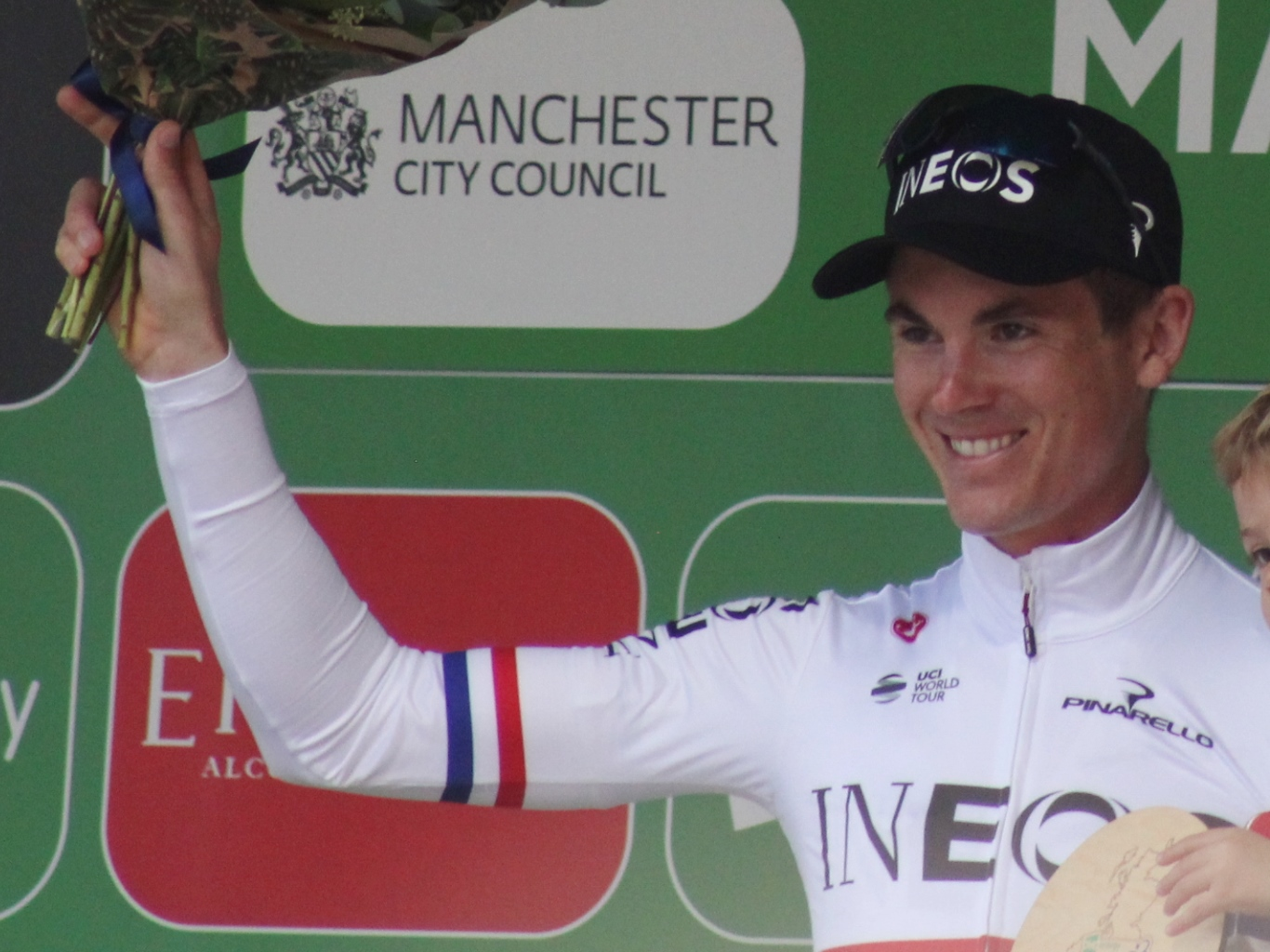
Wearing the national champion's jersey in 2019

On 19 March 2016, Swift finished second in Milan–San Remo, being narrowly outsprinted by Arnaud Démare (FDJ).

=== UAE Abu Dhabi ===
After seven seasons with Sky, in September 2016 Swift announced that he would join UAE Abu Dhabi on a two-year deal from 2017 in order to seek more opportunities to ride for himself.

=== Return to Team Sky ===
In October 2018, Swift rejoined Team Sky for the 2019 season. In June 2019, Swift won the British National Road Race Championships in Norwich, beating team leader Ian Stannard. In September 2019, Swift signed a new contract to remain with Team Ineos until the end of the 2021 season. Swift said he had 'found a renewed enthusiasm and motivation for the sport'. As of July 2023 he was still part of the Ineos Grenadiers’ squad.

== Personal life ==
His cousin, Connor Swift, is also an English professional road racing cyclist, and the 2018 British champion. He resides in England.

== Major results ==
=== Road ===
2007
Giro delle Regioni

1st Mountains classification
1st Stage 4

1st Mountains classification, Tour of Britain
3rd Milan–Busseto
4th Gran Premio della Liberazione
5th Road race, UEC European Under-23 Championships
7th La Côte Picarde
2008
1st Coppa della Pace
1st GP Coppa Romita
1st Stage 5 Giro della Valle d'Aosta Mont Blanc
4th Road race, UCI World Under-23 Championships
4th Road race, UEC European Under-23 Championships
6th Gran Premio Industrie del Marmo
10th Gran Premio della Liberazione
2009 (1 pro win)
1st Stage 7 Tour of Britain
2nd Nokere Koerse
8th Gran Premio di Lugano
10th Gran Premio dell'Insubria-Lugano
2010 (2)
1st Overall Tour de Picardie

1st Points classification
1st Young rider classification
1st Stage 2

2011 (5)
1st Stage 5 Tour de Romandie
1st Stage 2 Tour of California
1st Stage 5 Vuelta a Castilla y León
3rd Overall Tour Down Under

1st Stages 2 & 6

2012 (2)
Tour de Pologne

1st Points classification
1st Stages 2 & 5

4th Road race, National Championships
2013
3rd Time trial, National Championships
3rd Trofeo Palma de Mallorca
5th Trofeo Serra de Tramuntana
10th RideLondon–Surrey Classic
10th Trofeo Campos–Santanyí–Ses Salines
2014 (2)
Settimana Internazionale di Coppi e Bartali

1st Points classification
1st Stages 1a & 1b (TTT)

1st Stage 5 Tour of the Basque Country
2nd Road race, National Championships
2nd RideLondon–Surrey Classic
2nd Trofeo Ses Salines
3rd Milan–San Remo
3rd Trofeo Muro–Port d'Alcúdia
8th Nokere Koerse
2015 (1)
2nd Overall Settimana Internazionale di Coppi e Bartali

1st Points classification
1st Stage 2

3rd RideLondon–Surrey Classic
3rd Trofeo Playa de Palma
7th Trofeo Santanyi–Ses Salines–Campos
9th Japan Cup
9th International Road Cycling Challenge
2016
1st Points classification, Vuelta a Andalucía
2nd Milan–San Remo
7th Overall Tour du Poitou-Charentes
7th Gran Piemonte
8th Overall Tour of Britain
8th Cadel Evans Great Ocean Road Race
2017
5th Road race, UCI World Championships
5th Road race, National Championships
10th Eschborn–Frankfurt
2019 (1)
1st Road race, National Championships
2020
8th Kuurne–Brussels–Kuurne
10th Milano–Torino
2021 (1)
1st Road race, National Championships (Lincoln GP)
3rd Grand Prix de Denain
2022
8th Milano–Torino
2025
4th Super 8 Classic
7th Surf Coast Classic

==== Grand Tour general classification results timeline ====
Grand Tour	2009	2010	2011	2012	2013	2014	2015	2016	2017	2018	2019	2020	2021	2022	2023	2024
Giro d'Italia	127	—	—	—	—	113	—	—	—	—	—	18	—	66	61	58
Tour de France	—	—	135	—	—	—	—	—	83	—	—	—	—	—	—	—
/ Vuelta a España	—	DNF	—	121	—	—	—	—	—	—	—	—	—	—	—	—

==== Monument results timeline ====
Monument	2011	2012	2013	2014	2015	2016	2017	2018	2019	2020	2021	2022	2023	2024	2025
Milan–San Remo	—	—	—	3	13	2	17	44	—	31	76	108	73	113	130
Tour of Flanders	111	—	—	—	—	—	—	DNF	—	—	—	74	—	DNF	108
Paris–Roubaix	—	—	—	—	—	—	—	—	—	—	—	—	—	58	81
Liège–Bastogne–Liège	—	—	—	—	—	44	—	—	—	—	—	—	—	—	—
Giro di Lombardia	—	—	—	DNF	—	DNF	—	—	—	DNF	98	—	103	33	—

Legend
—	Did not compete
DNF	Did not finish
IP	Race in Progress

=== Track ===
2004
1st Points race, National Junior Championships
2005
National Junior Championships

1st Scratch
3rd Individual pursuit

1st Dortmund, UIV Talent Cup (with Geraint Thomas)
National Championships

2nd Madison (with Matt Rowe)
3rd Scratch

2006
2nd Team pursuit, National Championships
2007
1st Team pursuit, UEC European Under-23 Championships
2nd Points race, National Championships
3rd Team pursuit, UCI World Cup Classics, Manchester
2009
3rd Individual pursuit, National Championships
2010
2nd Team pursuit, UCI World Championships
2012
UCI World Championships

1st Scratch
2nd Points race
2nd Madison (with Geraint Thomas)
