= Tristan Robbins =

British cyclist

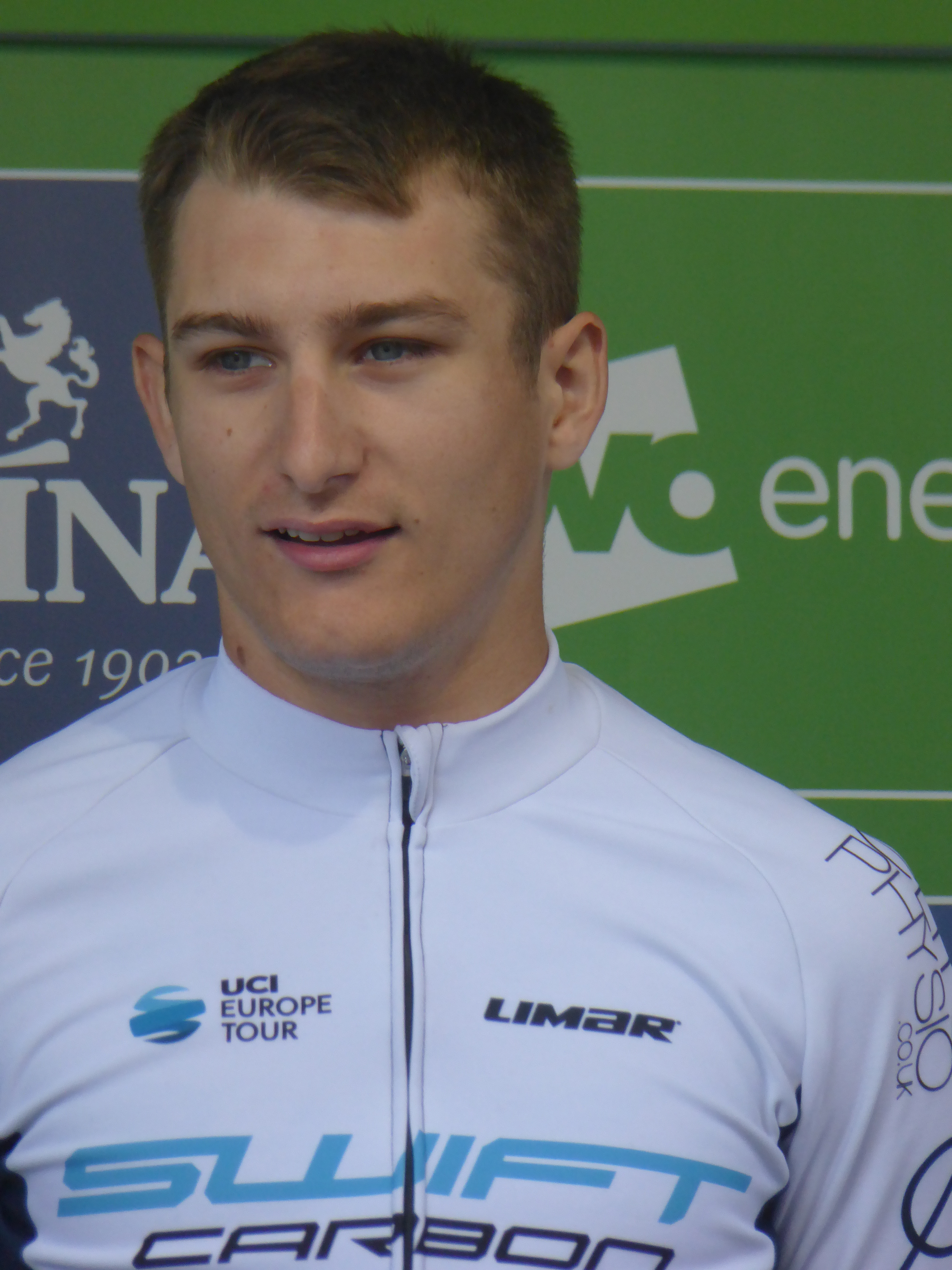
- Robbins at the 2019 Tour of Britain

Personal information
- Full name: Tristan Alexander Robbins
- Born: 26 May 1996 (age 30) Bristol, United Kingdom
- Height: 5 ft 10 in (178 cm)
- Weight: 66 kg (146 lb)

Cycling career
- Sport: Cycling
- Current team: Retired
- Disciplines: Road; Track
- Role: Rider
- Rider type: Endurance

Amateur teams
- 2010–2013: Cardiff JIF
- 2014: BH–Solidor–WAMyouth
- 2018: Team PB Performance

Professional teams
- 2015–2016: Madison Genesis
- 2017: Team Raleigh–GAC
- 2019–2021: SwiftCarbon Pro Cycling

Tristan Alexander Robbins (born 26 May 1996) is a British former road racing cyclist, who rode between 2015 and 2021 for UCI Continental teams Madison Genesis, Team Raleigh–GAC and SwiftCarbon Pro Cycling.

== Major results ==
2012
National Track Championships

1st Youth points race
3rd Junior points race

2013
1st Junior Tour of the Mendips
2014
1st Road race, National Junior Road Championships
National Track Championships

1st Junior points race
4th Points race

2015
1st John Walker Memorial Road Race
1st Under-23 Talent Cup, Six Days of London
1st Kalas Cup
2nd South Region Road Race
2016
1st Betty Pharoah Memorial Legstretchers Road Race
1st Kalas Cup
2017
1st Scorpion CS Road Race
1st Noel Jones Memorial Road Race
2nd Team pursuit, BUCS National Track Championships
2018
1st Club team rider, Grande prémio de ciclismo Mortágua
2nd Road race, BUCS National Road Championships
2nd Kalas Cup
2019
5th Ryedale Grand Prix
