= Melanie Szubrycht =

British cyclist

Personal information
- Born: 12 September 1969 (age 57) Rother Valley, West Riding of Yorkshire

Cycling career
- Sport: Cycling
- Disciplines: Road and track
- Role: Rider

Major wins
- British Champion

Melanie Dawn Szubrycht is a female former British international track and road racing cyclist.

== Cycling career ==
Szubrycht became British champion in 1998 after winning the British National Scratch Championships at the 1998 British National Track Championships.

She represented England in the road race and the points and sprint races on the track, at the 1998 Commonwealth Games in Kuala Lumpur, Malaysia. Four years later she represented England again on the track, at the 2002 Commonwealth Games.

== Palmarès ==
1998

- 1st Scratch, 1998 British National Track Championships
- 2nd Points, 1998 British National Track Championships
- 3rd time trial, 1998 British National Track Championships
- 3rd Sprint, 1998 British National Track Championships
