= Rebecca Raybould =

British cyclist

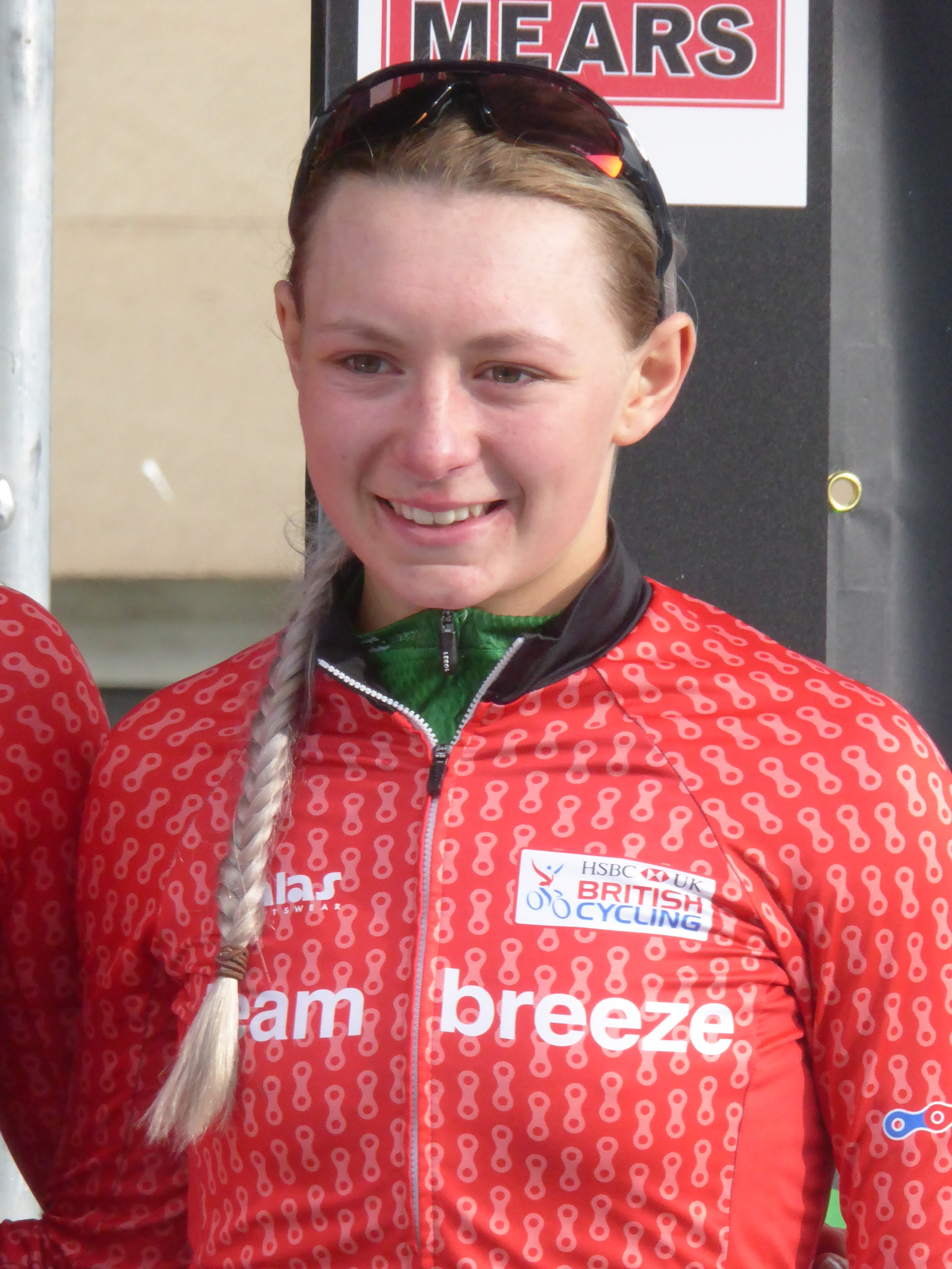
- Raybould in 2018

Personal information
- Born: 14 April 1998 (age 28) Nuneaton, Warwickshire

Cycling career
- Sport: Cycling
- Current team: Retired
- Disciplines: Road; Track
- Role: Rider
- Rider type: Endurance (track)

Amateur teams
- 2012–2016: Poole Wheelers CC
- 2018: Team Breeze

Professional teams
- 2016–2017: Team Breeze
- 2019: Team Breeze

Rebecca Raybould (born 14 April 1998) is a British former road and track cyclist. As part of Team Breeze, Raybould won the British National Team Pursuit Championships at the 2018 British National Track Championships and the 2019 British National Track Championships. She also represented England at the 2018 Commonwealth Games in the time trial and pursuit events and was World Junior champion in the scratch race in 2016.

== Major results ==
2015
National Junior Track Championships

1st Points race
3rd Scratch

4th London Nocturne
2016
1st Scratch, UCI Junior Track Cycling World Championships
2nd Individual pursuit, National Junior Track Championships
UEC European Junior Track Championships

3rd Points race
3rd Team pursuit

3rd National Madison Championships (with Megan Barker)
2017
3rd Madison, National Track Championships (with Abbie Dentus)
2018
1st Team pursuit, National Track Championships
UEC European Under-23 Track Championships

2nd Scratch
2nd Team pursuit

2019
1st Team pursuit, National Track Championships
