= Angela Hunter (cyclist) =

British cyclist

Personal information
- Born: 22 September 1972 (age 54) Manchester, England, UK

Cycling career
- Sport: Cycling
- Disciplines: Road and track
- Role: Rider

Major wins
- 6 x British Champion

Angela Hunter (born 1972) is a female former British international track and road racing cyclist.

== Cycling career ==
Hunter became a double British champion in 2001 after winning the British National Points Championships and British National Scratch Championships titles at the 2001 British National Track Championships. She repeated this feat the following year winning her third and fourth British titles respectively. In 2003, Angela won Gold in both the British 10 mile and 50 mile time trial Championships.

She represented England in the road race, at the 1998 Commonwealth Games in Kuala Lumpur, Malaysia.

== Palmarès ==
1996

- 3rd Points, 1996 British National Track Championships

1998

- 3rd Scratch, 1998 British National Track Championships

2000

- 2nd Points, 2000 British National Track Championships

2001

- 1st Scratch, 2001 British National Track Championships
- 1st Points, 2001 British National Track Championships

2002

- 1st Scratch, 2002 British National Track Championships
- 1st Points, 2002 British National Track Championships
- 2nd Pursuit, 2002 British National Track Championships

2003

- 1st British National 10 mile Championships
- 1st British National 50 mile Championships
