= Katie Prankerd =

Welsh cyclist (born 1988)

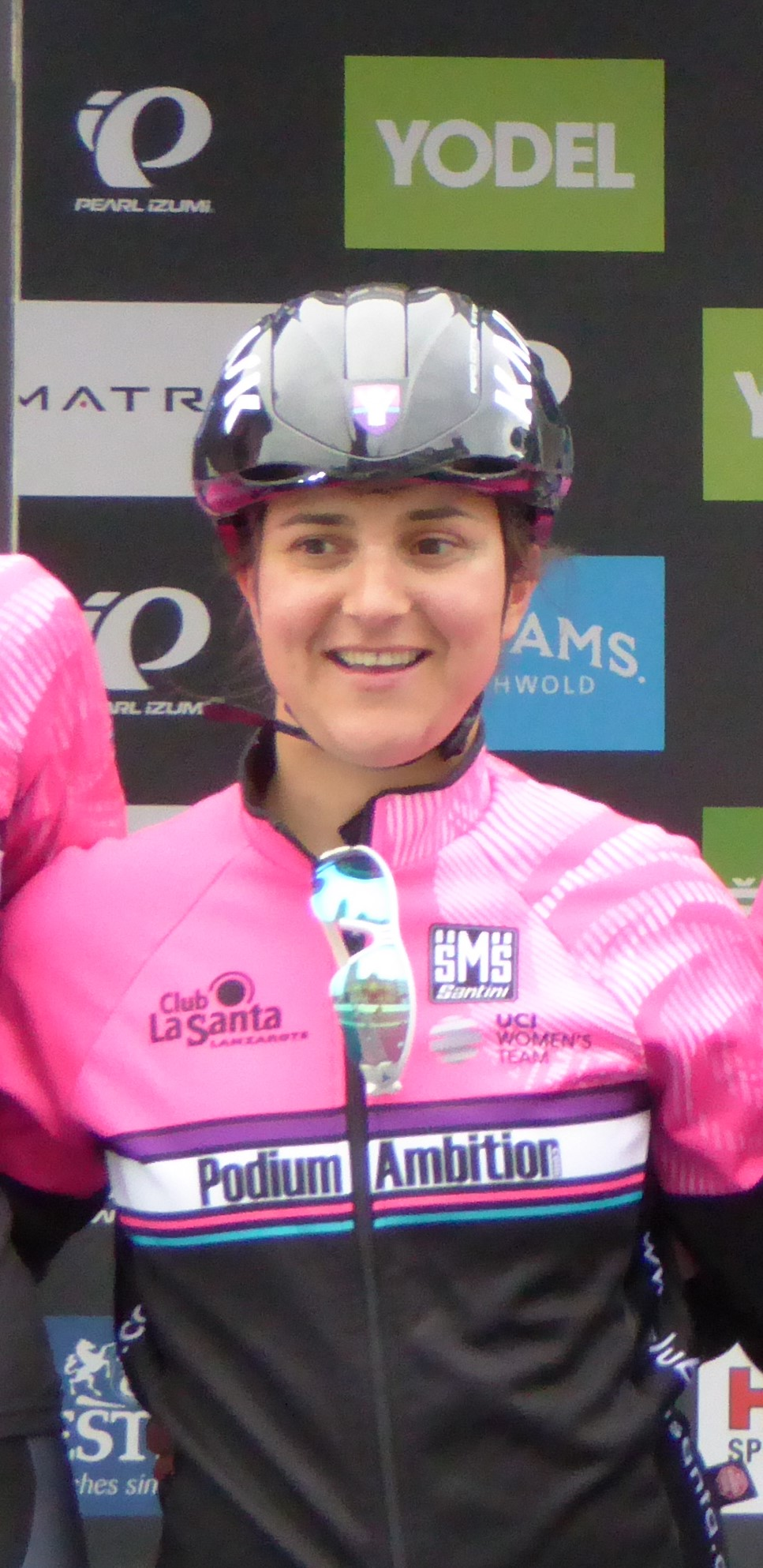

Personal information
- Full name: Catherine Rachel Prankerd
- Born: Catherine Rachel Curtis; 1 November 1988 (age 37) Cardiff, Wales
- Height: 1.64 m (5 ft 5 in)
- Weight: 64 kg (141 lb; 10.1 st)

Cycling career
- Sport: Cycling
- Current team: Retired
- Disciplines: Road; Track
- Role: Rider
- Rider type: Endurance

Amateur teams
- Maindy Flyers
- Cardiff Ajax
- 2007: Team Global Racing
- 2008: Team Halfords Bikehut
- 2009: Vision1 Racing
- 2010–2013: Cardiff Jif
- 2017: Storey Racing

Professional teams
- 2014: Starley Primal
- 2016: Podium Ambition Pro Cycling

Major wins
- (United Kingdom) British Champion Junior x2 (Wales) Welsh Champion

Catherine Rachel "Katie" Prankerd (née Curtis; born 1 November 1988) is a Welsh former professional road and track cyclist.

== Career ==
Born in Cardiff, Prankerd began competing at a young age with the Maindy Flyers children's cycle club before joining Cardiff Ajax. Prankerd set the record for the 5-kilometre (3.1-mile) Tandem Standing Start event on the track along with Alex Greenfield, with a time of 7 minutes 4.424 seconds. The record was set at the Newport Velodrome on 10 June 2004. They also held the 10-kilometre (6.2-mile) Tandem Standing Start event on the track, with a time of 13 minutes 10.421 seconds. The record was also set at the Newport Velodrome, on 16 May 2006. In 2008 Prankerd rode with Team Halfords Bikehut before moving to Vision1 Racing in 2009.

Prankerd suffered a setback to her cycling career when she was diagnosed with Crohn's disease. Subsequently, she took up a coaching role at the Wales National Velodrome in Newport and teamed up with partially sighted cyclist Nia Knight with a view to competing in the tandem event at the 2014 Commonwealth Games. Prankerd subsequently rode solo, representing Wales in the scratch race, where she finished 7th.

== Major results ==
=== Track ===
2003
3rd Scratch, National Youth Championships
2004
National Youth Championships

1st Points race
1st Scratch
2nd Sprint

3rd Scratch, National Junior Championships
Commonwealth Youth Games

4th 500m time trial
7th Points race

2005
National Junior Championships

1st Scratch
2nd Points race
3rd Sprint

3rd Keirin, National Championships
2006
National Junior Championships

1st Points race
2nd Scratch

National Championships

2nd Scratch
3rd Points race

2007
1st WCRA 'Derny Paced' Championships
National Championships

2nd Points race
3rd Derny
3rd Scratch

8th Scratch, UCI Track World Championships
2013
Newport International Cup

3rd Female B 3km Individual pursuit (with Nia Knight)
7th Female B 1km Time trial (with Nia Knight)

9th Tandem B road race, UCI Paracycling World Cup round 5, Matane (with Nia Knight)
2014
7th Scratch, Commonwealth Games
2015
Revolution Round 6, Manchester

2nd Points race
2nd Scratch

2017
3rd Team pursuit, National Championships

=== Road ===
2003
2nd Criterium, National Junior Road Championships
2004
1st Criterium, National Junior Road Championships
2007
1st Road race, Welsh Road Championships
3rd Criterium, National Road Championships
2013
2nd Tandem, National Paracycling Road Circuit Championships (with Nia Knight)
2014
1st Newport Nocturne
5th Milk Race
8th Cheshire Classic
2015
3rd Women's Tour de Yorkshire
3rd Milk Race
5th Cheshire Classic
9th London Nocturne
