= Jeff Snodin =

British cyclist (born 1965)

Personal information
- Nationality: English
- Born: 1965; Melton Mowbray, Leicestershire

Sport
- Sport: Cycling
- Club: Witham Wheelers

Jeffrey 'Jeff' A Snodin (born 1965), is a male former cyclist who competed for England.

== Athletics career ==
Snodin was a seven times National Champion at various levels.

He represented England in the 10 mile scratch race event, at the 1994 Commonwealth Games in Victoria, British Columbia, Canada.
