= Ross Reid (cyclist) =

Welsh racing cyclist

Personal information
- Full name: Ross Reid
- Born: 21 August 1987 (age 39) Llanharry, Wales

Cycling career
- Sport: Cycling
- Disciplines: Track & Road
- Role: Rider
- Rider type: Pursuit

Amateur teams
- 1998?-: Maindy Flyers CRT
- 2002-2004: VC St Raphael
- 2005: Port Talbot Wheelers
- 2007: Tîm V.C. Seano One
- 2007: 100% ME

Professional team
- 2008: Rapha Condor recycling.co.uk

Ross Reid, previously known as Ross Sander (born 21 August 1987) is a Welsh former professional racing cyclist from Llanharry, Vale of Glamorgan, Wales. He represented Wales at the Youth Commonwealth Games in 2004. He was part of the British quartet that took the gold medal in the junior men's team pursuit at the 2005 UEC European Track Championships, alongside Steven Burke, Ian Stannard and Andy Tennant. Shortly afterwards, he broke his wrist whilst competing in the team pursuit, representing Great Britain in the junior UCI Track Cycling World Championships in 2005: after setting a new British record in the qualifying round, Reid and Burke touched wheels and crashed in the final - the team won silver, losing the gold to New Zealand because of the accident. He represented Wales once again in the 2006 Commonwealth Games, in the scratch and points races, and became British champion in the points race the same year. Reid is also a citizen of the United States. According to Rod Ellingworth, who coached Reid when he was part of the British Cycling set-up, he subsequently left the sport and joined the United States Army.
