= Hannah Mayho =

English cyclist

Personal information
- Full name: Hannah Mayho
- Born: 10 December 1990 (age 35) England; United Kingdom

Cycling career
- Sport: Cycling
- Disciplines: Road and track
- Role: Rider
- Rider type: Endurance

Amateur team
- 2006: Raleigh ERV

Major wins
- (Europe) European Champion Junior (United Kingdom) British Champion U16 & Junior

Hannah Mayho (born 10 December 1990) is an English road and track cyclist from Cullingworth, West Yorkshire, and a member of British Cycling's Olympic Academy Squad. A former county netball player and cross-country runner, Mayho began cycling in 2006 having been spotted at her school by British Cycling's Talent Team, she was then coached by their coaches Phil West and Frances Newstead. At first she concentrated on athletics, but, seeing the pathway to success more clearly defined in cycling, she chose to concentrate on that sport.

A car collided with her on a training ride in May 2010, breaking her left leg and her right arm and wrist. A year after her accident Mayho returned to racing at the British National Time Trial Championships where she finished third in the Junior Women's event.

Mayho went on to study for a BSc in Nutrition and Dietetics at the University of Chester.

== Palmarès ==
2006
1st (United Kingdom) British National Circuit Race Championships (U16)
1st (United Kingdom) Pursuit, British National Track Championships (U16)
3rd Pursuit, British National Track Championships (Junior)

2007
2nd Pursuit, 2007 European Track Championships (Junior)
1st (United Kingdom) Pursuit, British National Track Championships (Junior)
1st (United Kingdom) British National Road Race Championships (Junior)
2nd Scratch race, British National Track Championships (Junior)
3rd 500m TT, British National Track Championships (Junior)

2008
1st (Europe) Pursuit, 2008 European Track Championships (Junior)
1st (Europe) Team pursuit, 2008 European Track Championships (Junior)
3rd (United Kingdom) British National Road Race Championships (Junior)
1st (United Kingdom) Pursuit, British National Track Championships (Junior)
3rd 500m TT, British National Track Championships (Junior)

2009

2nd (Europe) Pursuit, 2009 UEC European Cup, Barcelona (Senior)
2nd (United Kingdom) Pursuit, British National Track Championships (Senior)
2nd (United Kingdom) Scratch Race, British National Track Championships (Senior)
2nd (United Kingdom) Points Race, British National Track Championships (Senior)

2011
3rd (United Kingdom) 10-mile Time Trial, British National Time Trial Championships (Junior)
