= Bethany Hayward =

British cyclist

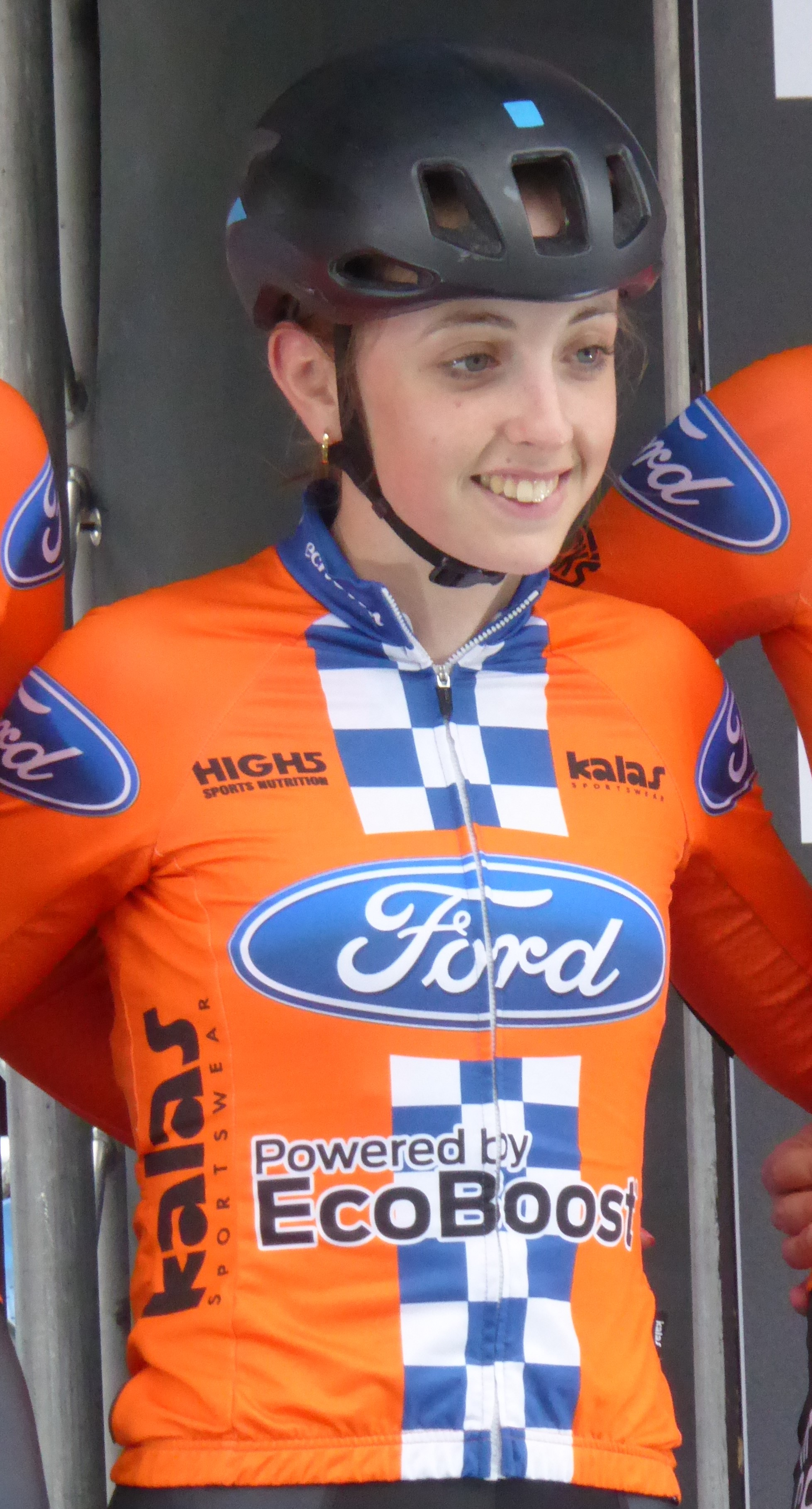
- Hayward in 2017

Personal information
- Full name: Bethany Hayward
- Born: 20 November 1996 (age 29)

Cycling career
- Sport: Cycling
- Current team: Team Ford EcoBoost
- Discipline: Road
- Role: Rider

Amateur teams
- 2005–2012: Welwyn Wheelers
- 2013: Ikon–Mazda
- 2013: Scott Contessa Epic
- 2014: Matrix Fitness–Vulpine
- 2017–: Team Ford EcoBoost

Professional team
- 2015–2016: Pearl Izumi–Boot Out Breast Cancer

Bethany Hayward (born 20 November 1996) is a British professional racing cyclist who rides for Team Ford EcoBoost as of 2016/17.

== See also ==
- List of 2016 UCI Women's Teams and riders
