= Rachel Heal =

English racing cyclist

Personal information
- Full name: Rachel Elisabeth Heal
- Born: 1 April 1973 (age 53) Bebington, Wirral, Cheshire

Cycling career
- Sport: Cycling
- Current team: EF Education–Tibco–SVB
- Disciplines: Road; Track; Cyclo-cross
- Role: Rider (former); Directeur sportif

Amateur teams
- 1997–1999: Birkenhead Northend Cycling Club
- 2000: Letchworth Velo
- 2007: Rapha Condor

Professional teams
- 2004: Farm Frites
- 2005: Team Cambridge
- 2006: Team Victory Brewing
- 2007: Team Webcor
- 2008: Team Tibco
- 2009: Colavita–Sutter Home

Managerial teams
- 2010–2011: Colavita/Baci
- 2012–2013: Optum Pro Cycling
- 2014–2018: UnitedHealthcare (women)
- 2014–2018: UnitedHealthcare (men)
- 2019–: Tibco–Silicon Valley Bank

Rachel Elisabeth Heal (born 1 April 1973) is an English former racing cyclist, who currently works a directeur sportif for UCI Women's Continental Team EF Education–Tibco–SVB.

== Career ==
=== Professional career ===
Heal originally took up cycling when she was at Birmingham University as a means of transportation. She joined British Cycling's World Class Performance Plan in 2001 to become a full-time cyclist. She turned professional and rode for the Farm Frites team after obtaining a degree in chemical engineering. She has competed in world championships, Commonwealth Games and the Olympic Games. Heal is also a British Cycling level 2 coach, and a qualified personal trainer.

=== Management career ===
Heal switched to management when she became co-director of the Colavita/Baci team in 2010 alongside team-mate Tina Pic, replacing Iona Wynter. After the Colavita team disbanded at the end of 2011, Heal became director of the new Optum Pro Cycling team for 2012. Heal left the team at the end of 2013 to join UnitedHealthcare, where she made history in 2014 as the first British woman to direct a men's team at a world tour event.

== Major results ==
2001
2nd Points race, British National Track Championships
4th Road race, National Road Championships

2002
1st Stage 5 Gracia–Orlová
National Road Championships

2nd Road race
3rd Time trial

2nd WCRA 2 day, Leicestershire
3rd Road race, Commonwealth Games

2003
2nd Road race, National Road Championships
National Track Championships

2nd Points race
3rd Individual pursuit

3rd Ronde van Drenthe

2004
1st Stage 7 Tour de l'Aude Féminin
1st Stage 1b (TTT) Holland Ladies Tour
2nd Road race, National Road Championships
3rd National Cyclo-cross Championships
3rd Points race, National Track Championships
7th Australia World Cup

2005
1st Omnium, Aztec Track Meet
National Road Championships

2nd Road race
2nd Time trial

National Track Championships

2nd Scratch
2nd Individual pursuit

2006
1st Tri Peaks Stage Race
1st Tour of Elk Grove Crit
4th Overall Tour of the Gila
Commonwealth Games

5th Road race
5th Time trial

2007
1st Stage 1 (TTT) Tour de Toona
2nd Road race, National Road Championships
2nd Overall Tour of the Gila

1st Stage 1 (ITT)

7th Women's Cycling Criteriums

2008
1st Stage 4 Tour of the Gila
3rd Sea Otter Classic

2009
7th Sea Otter Circuit Race
