= Jon Norfolk =

British cyclist

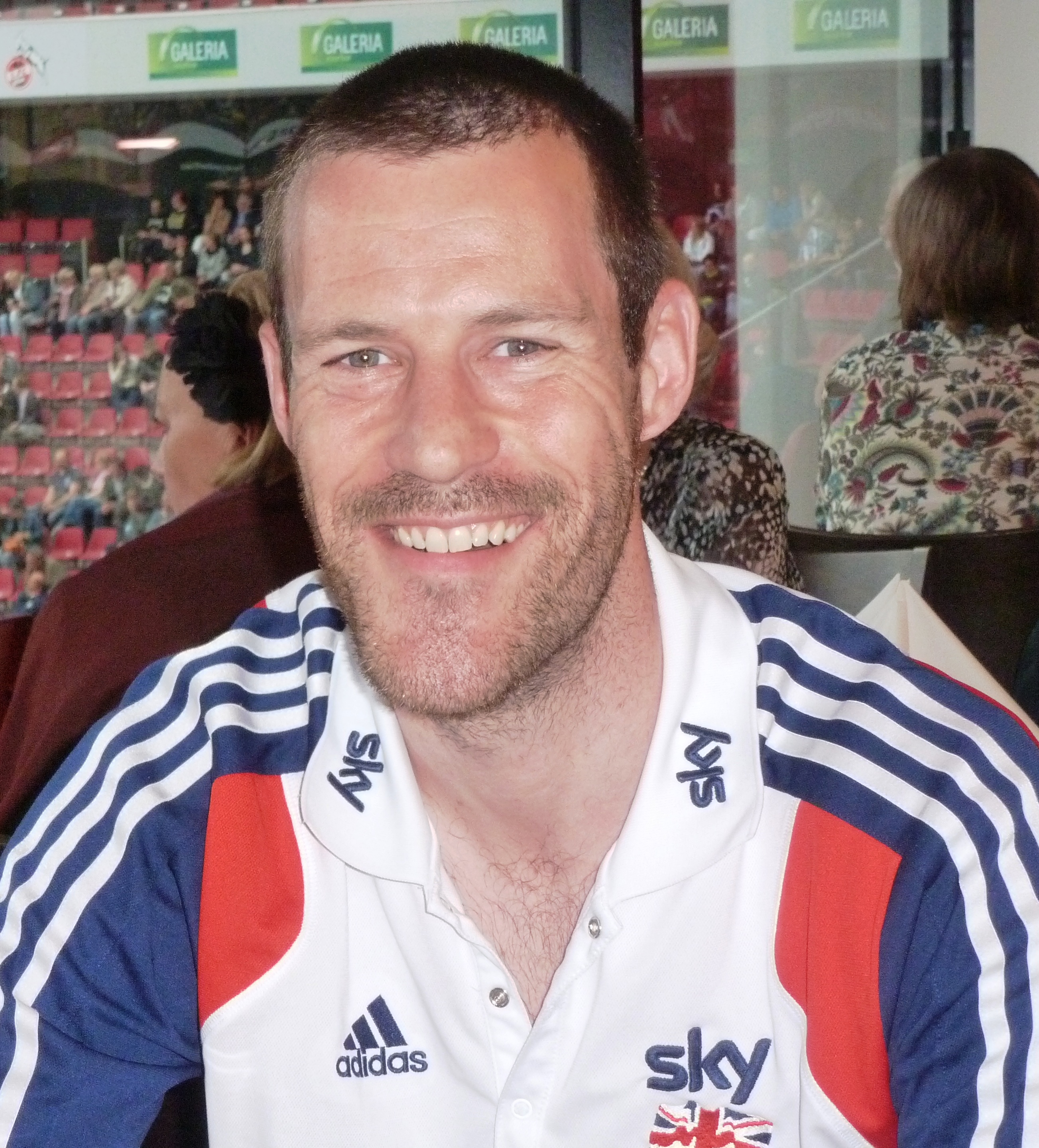

Personal information
- Full name: Jonathan Philip Norfolk
- Born: 29 March 1975 (age 51) Keighley, West Yorkshire, England

Cycling career
- Sport: Cycling
- Discipline: Track Cycling
- Role: Sprint Coach

Professional team
- Great Britain Cycling Team

Jonathan Philip Norfolk MBE (born 29 March 1975) is a Great Britain track cycling national sprint coach, and an ex international cyclist.

== Biography ==
Born in Keighley, West Yorkshire, Jon Norfolk now lives in Cheshire and is the Great Britain Paracycling Head Coach, formally Assistant National Sprint Coach to the Great Britain Cycling Team.

He gained selection onto the Great Britain Cycling Team himself in November 2003 following a number of successful years of track sprint competition and many national titles. He went on to represent Great Britain in a numerous of international competitions including World Cup events in Sydney (Aus) and Mexico. Following this, he began working as a tandem pilot with the paralympic athlete Anthony Kappes and took a three-year break from competition in order to qualify for the Beijing Paralympics.

Following 2 years of training and unofficially breaking world records in the kilo (1.02.0) and sprint 200m TT (10.20) Kappes and Norfolk broke the world record in the kilo (B/VI class) with a time of 1:02.008 and beat Simon Jackson and Storey to win the sprint event at the 2008 VISA Paralympic World Cup.

Since switching to a coaching role, Jon has coached sprint athletes through the Great Britain Olympic Development and Academy Programmes and works with the GB podium athletes in training and competitions including Worlds Cups, Beijing Paralympics and the Delhi Commonwealth Games.

In addition to his coaching role, Jon has presented in schools, community projects and has worked with corporate clients & media groups including the BBC (Blue Peter), BBC Radio commentary and Lloyds Banking Group.

Norfolk was appointed Member of the Order of the British Empire (MBE) in the 2017 New Year Honours for services to cycling.

== Palmarès ==
=== Able-bodied competition ===
2001
1st (United Kingdom) Keirin, British National Track Championships
3rd Kilo, British National Track Championships

2002
1st (United Kingdom) Keirin, British National Track Championships
2nd Tandem Sprint, British National Track Championships (with Ian George)

2005
2nd Kilo, British National Track Championships

2007
3rd Team Sprint, British National Track Championships
3rd Tandem Sprint, British National Track Championships (with Anthony Kappes)

=== As a tandem pilot ===
2008
1st Kilo, VISA Paralympic World Cup (with Anthony Kappes)
1st Sprint, VISA Paralympic World Cup (with Anthony Kappes)
