= Lucy Shaw =

British cyclist

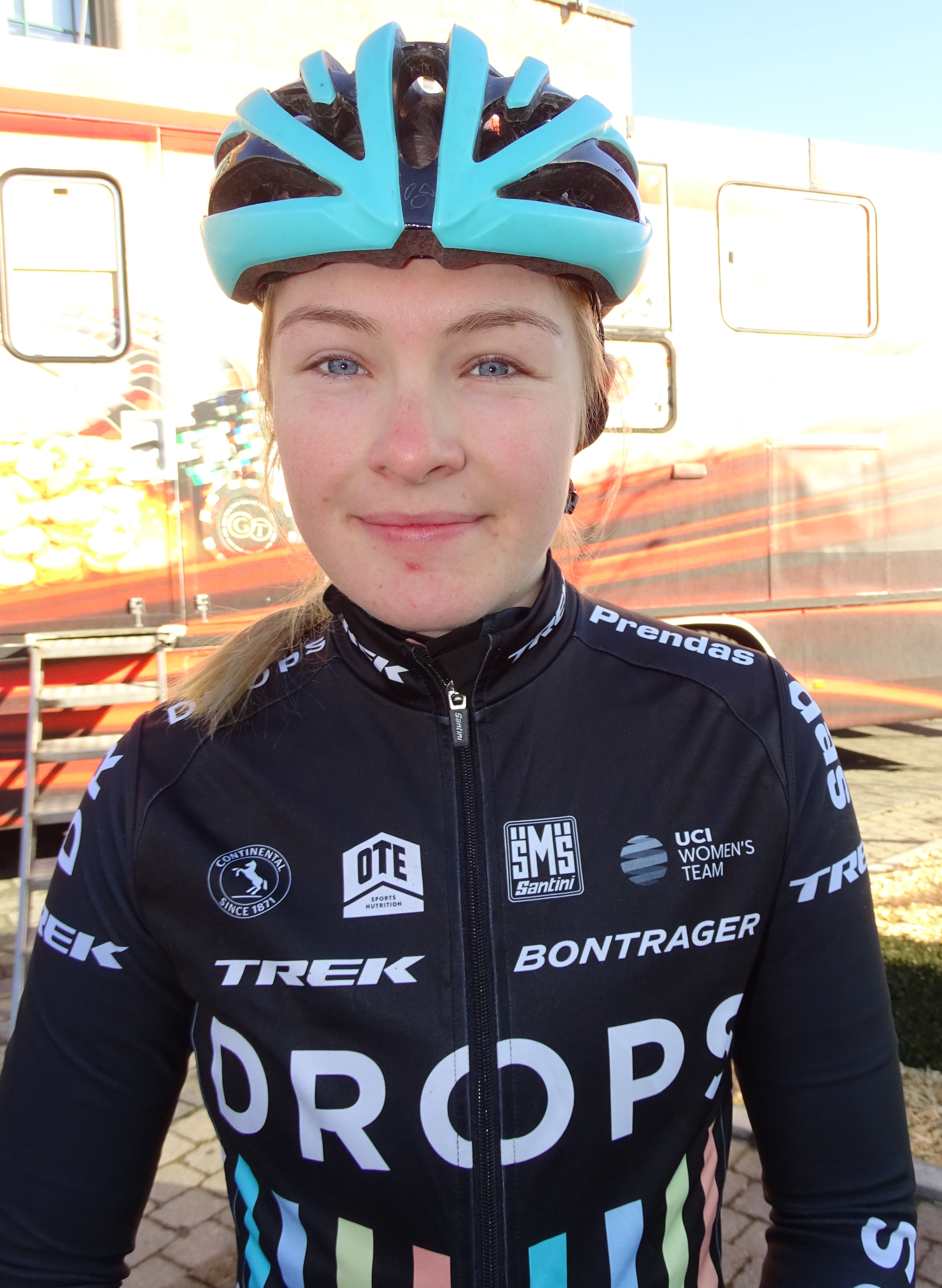
- Shaw in 2016.

Personal information
- Full name: Lucy Shaw
- Born: 17 July 1997 (age 29)

Cycling career
- Sport: Cycling
- Discipline: Road
- Role: Rider

Amateur team
- 2015: Matrix Fitness Pro Cycling

Professional team
- 2016–2019: Drops

Lucy Shaw (born 17 July 1997) is a British professional racing cyclist, who last rode for UCI Women's Team Drops.

== See also ==
- List of 2016 UCI Women's Teams and riders
