= Kieran Page =

English racing cyclist (born 1983)

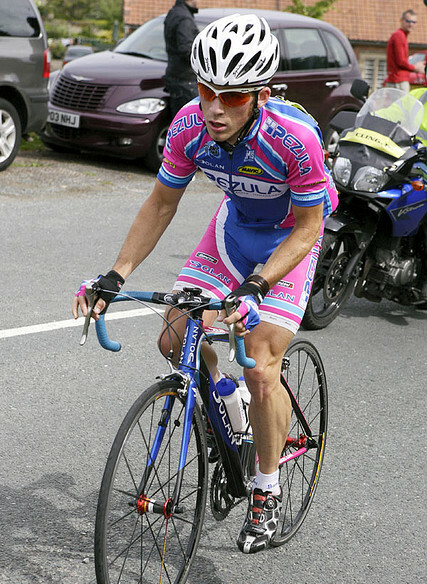
- Page at the UK 2008 national road cycling championships, Helmsley, North Yorkshire

Personal information
- Full name: Kieran Hersey Page
- Born: 2 May 1983 (age 43) United Kingdom

Cycling career
- Sport: Cycling
- Disciplines: Mountain Bike, Road & Track
- Role: Rider

Amateur teams
- 2001: SP Systems/Wightlink RT
- 2004: UVCA Troyes
- Aug 2006-Dec 2006: Team L.P.R. (stagiaire)
- 2007: AVC Aix-en-Provence
- 2012-2013: Sprinter Club de Nice

Professional team
- 2008: Pezula Racing

Kieran Page (born 2 May 1983) is a British professional racing cyclist. He represented Britain at the junior road world championship in 2001, and competed in the Under-23 road race at the UCI Road World Championships in 2004 and 2005.

Page set a new Commonwealth record at the 2002 Commonwealth Games with 4:29:662 in the 4 km pursuit. The previous record was held by Brad McGee in 4:30:594, set in 1998.

Born in Newport on the Isle of Wight, Page now lives in Nice, France. He moved there in 2004, racing for the UVCA Troyes team. Page was a member of British Cycling's World Class Performance Plan until 2006.

== Palmarès ==
1999
1st Individual Time Trial, European Youth Summer Olympic Days
1st (United Kingdom) Scratch race, British National Track Championships - Junior

2000
1st (United Kingdom) British National Road Race Championships - Junior
1st (United Kingdom) Pursuit, British National Track Championships - Junior
2nd Points race, British National Track Championships - Senior
2nd Kilo, British National Track Championships - Junior

2001
1st (United Kingdom) Pursuit, British National Track Championships - Junior
2nd British National Road Race Championships - Junior
3rd Kilo, British National Track Championships - Junior

2002
2nd Madison, British National Track Championships (with Kieran Page, SP Systems)

2003
2nd Team Pursuit, 2003 UCI Track Cycling World Cup Classics, Round 3, Cape Town

2005
3rd Points race, British National Track Championships

2006
2nd Scratch race, British National Track Championships

2008
5th, Race 2 World View Challenge
8th, Overall FBD Insurance Ras
