= Sally Boyden (cyclist) =

British cyclist

Personal information
- Full name: Sally Boyden
- Born: 7 April 1967 (age 59) North Ferriby, England

Cycling career
- Sport: Cycling
- Disciplines: Road and track
- Role: Rider

Amateur teams
- 1994: Swaledale CC
- 1999: Velo Club Lannion
- 2000: Clarkes Contracts
- 2002: Classic Walls CRT

Major wins
- World Masters Champion (United Kingdom) British Champion x10

Sally Boyden (born 7 April 1967 in North Ferriby, East Riding of Yorkshire) is a female former British track and road racing cyclist.

== Cycling career ==
She was British National Champion of the points race five times in a row from 1995 to 1999 and a British champion on road and track 10 times. She competed and was a medalist at the World Masters Championships on several occasions and held the British record for the flying kilometre and standing kilometre time trial on the track. The kilometre record of 1:14.18 was set in 1995 and broken in 2005 by Victoria Pendleton with 1:10.854. Boyden was also the European Masters Track Champion in the individual pursuit event for riders aged 35–39, in 2002.

She represented England in the road race and track points race, at the 1998 Commonwealth Games in Kuala Lumpur, Malaysia.

== Palmarès ==
1993
1st British National Individual Sprint Championships
2nd British National Individual Time Trial Championships

1994
2nd British National Individual Sprint Championships
3rd British National Road Race Championships

1995
1st British National Points Championships
2nd British National Individual Sprint Championships
3rd British National Individual Time Trial Championships

1996
1st British National Points Championships
1st British National Scratch Championships

1997
3rd Elite European Track Championships
1st British National Points Championships
3rd British National Individual Sprint Championships
3rd British National Individual Time Trial Championships
3rd British National Scratch Championships

1998
1st British National Points Championships
3rd British National Road Race Championships
3rd British National Circuit Race Championships
4th Points Race, Track World Cup

1999
1st British National Points Championships
1st British National Circuit Race Championships
2nd British National Scratch Championships
3rd British National Individual Pursuit Championships

2000
2nd British National Scratch Championships
3rd British National Points Championships

2001
3rd pursuit, World Masters Track Championships (30-34)

2002
1st Pursuit, World Masters Track Championships (35-39)
1st Pursuit, European Masters Track Championships (35-39)
2nd British National Points Championships
2nd British National Scratch Championships
3rd British National Circuit Race Championships
3rd sprint, World Masters Track Championship (35-39)
