= Laura Bissell =

English racing cyclist

Personal information
- Full name: Laura Elizabeth Bissell
- Nickname: Lulu
- Born: 19 June 1983 (age 43) England; Great Britain
- Height: 1.57 m (5 ft 2 in)

Cycling career
- Sport: Cycling
- Current team: scientific-coaching.com
- Disciplines: Road, time trail and track
- Role: Rider

Amateur team
- 1997–2004: Team Welwyn/Welwyn Wheelers

Professional teams
- 2005: Fat Birds UK (FBUK)
- 2006–2007: GS Strada
- 2008: scientific-coaching.com

Laura Elizabeth Bissell (born 19 June 1983) is an English road and track racing cyclist.

Bissell was born in Hitchin, England. She has represented her country at international events on several occasions. She was a member of the British Cycling Development Plan squad alongside Nicole Cooke, competing at the 2000 and 2001 junior road world championship and the 2001 junior track world championships in Trexlertown, Pennsylvania, United States.

Bissell lives in Stevenage, Hertfordshire. Her brother, Peter Bissell, was also a successful cyclist.

== Palmarès ==
1999
3rd Points race, British National Track Championships - U16
3rd Scratch race, British National Track Championships - U16
3rd Sprint, British National Track Championships - U16
3rd Pursuit, British National Track Championships - U16

2000
1st British National 25mile Time Trial Championships

2001
4th Pursuit, British National Track Championships

2002
3rd Points race, British National Track Championships

2003
4th Scratch race, British National Track Championships
4th Points race, British National Track Championships
6th Pursuit, British National Track Championships
1st Pursuit, Women’s Cycle Racing Association Track Championships

2004
3rd 800m, National Grass Track Championships
1st Pursuit, Women’s Cycle Racing Association Track Championships
3rd Scratch race, Women’s Cycle Racing Association Track Championships
5th National Women’s Team Series - Round 1, Astwood
5th National Women’s Team Series - Round 7, Towcester
8th British National Circuit Race Championships
11th British National Time Trial Championships

2005
3rd Scratch race, Women’s Cycle Racing Association Track Championships
1st British National Derny Championships
2nd Pursuit, British National Track Championships

2006
1st National Women’s Team Series Race - Sid Standard RR
2nd British National Derny Championships
2nd WCRA Circuit Race Championships
8th British National 10 mile Time Trial Championships

1st Part of winning team at British National 10 mile Time Trial Championships

10th British National 10 mile Time Trial Championships
3rd Scratch race, British National Track Championships
5th Pursuit, British National Track Championships (In personal best time: 3.52.075)

2007
3rd Overall Rudy Project National TT series

2nd Rudy Project National TT series - Event 1 of 8, 13 miles - 34.08
3rd Rudy Project National TT series - Event 3 of 8, 26 miles - 1.10.18
2nd Rudy Project National TT series - Event 6 of 8, 26 miles - 50.19
4th Rudy Project National TT series - Event 7 of 8, 20 miles
2nd Rudy Project National TT series - Event 8 of 8, 21 miles - 56.46

15th (out of 52) British National 25 mile Time Trial Championships

=== Personal Bests ===
To Date

- 10 miles (16 km): 23.21 in 2002 - 24.36 in 2008 - 24.24 in 2009
- 25 miles (40 km): 57.46 in 2004
- 50 miles (80 km): 2.7.02 in 2006
- 3000 metres: 3.52.075 in 2006
