= Jon Clay =

English cyclist

Jonny Clay
Personal information
- Full name: Jonathan Clay
- Born: 26 June 1963 (age 63) Leeds, West Yorkshire; England

Cycling career
- Sport: Cycling
- Disciplines: Track, Road & Cross-country
- Role: Rider

Professional teams
- 1986: Raleigh - Weinmann
- 1987: Raleigh - Banana
- 1988: P.M.S. - Dawes
- 1989: Raleigh - Banana
- 1990–1991: Banana Falcon
- 1992: Banana Met Helmets
- 1993–1995: Orange
- 1998: Brite Voice
- 1999: Linda McCartney Racing Team
Medal record
Representing Great Britain
Men's track cycling
Olympic Games
Bronze medal – third place	2000 Sydney	Team Pursuit

Jonathan Clay, better known as Jonny Clay (born 26 June 1963) is a British former professional cross-country, track and road racing cyclist. A silver medalist in the individual pursuit at the 1998 Commonwealth Games, Clay was also part of the team pursuit line up which took the bronze medal at the 2000 Summer Olympics in Sydney.

After retiring from competitive cycling in 2000, he was appointed British Cycling’s Regional Talent Manager for the North East. In 2004 he took over management of the membership department before being appointed Cycle Sport and Membership Director of British Cycling in 2009.

A winner of several Premier Calendar events, he now helps to organise some of the races. Clay is also a committee member for the Dave Rayner fund, which assists young cyclists to race on the continent, and hopefully, turn professional.

== Palmarès ==
1986
2nd Amateur British National Road Race Championships
2nd Overall, Premier Calendar series
1st Tour of the Peaks
21st World Amateur Road Race Championships (Colorado Springs USA)

1988

7th overall 'Milk Race' Tour of Britain

1995
1st Professional British National Circuit Race Championships

1996
3rd British National Circuit Race Championships

1997
3rd Overall, Premier Calendar series
3rd British National Time Trial Championships
4th Lincoln International Grand Prix

1998
2nd Individual pursuit, 1998 Commonwealth Games
1st (United Kingdom) British National Madison Championships (with Rob Hayles)
2nd Overall, Premier Calendar series
3rd Pursuit, British National Track Championships

1999
2nd British National Madison Championships (with Russell Downing)

2000
2nd Team Pursuit, UCI Track Cycling World Championships
3rd Team pursuit, 2000 Summer Olympics
2nd British National Road Race Championships
