= Emma Davies (cyclist) =

English cyclist

Emma Davies Jones
Personal information
- Born: Emma Davies; 4 October 1978 (age 48) Knutsford, Cheshire, England
- Height: 1.78 m (5 ft 10 in)
- Weight: 64 kg (141 lb)

Cycling career
- Sport: Cycling
- Disciplines: Track & Road
- Role: Rider
- Rider type: Pursuit

Amateur team
- 1990–2005: Manchester Wheelers' Club

Professional teams
- 2005–2007: Dames Vlaanderen
- 2008: Team Swift

Emma Davies Jones (born 4 October 1978) is a British Olympic cyclist. She competed in the 2000 and 2004 Summer Olympics.

== Biography ==
Born in Knutsford, Cheshire. Davies began cycling with the Manchester Wheelers' Club in 1990, aged 12, the first time she went out on a ride she fell, but made Harry Hall promise not to tell her parents in case the prevented her from participating in future. She enjoyed the experience so much she went on to compete, representing Britain at the UCI Junior World Championships in 1995 and 1996. She changed disciplines in 1997, from being a sprinter to an endurance track rider. Her riding developed which reflected in her results and maturity. She was then selected to compete at the 2000 Summer Olympics.

Davies became the pursuit national champion in 2001 and successfully defended her title in 2002. Davies began competing in the pursuit at the UCI Track Cycling World Cup Classics, taking her first gold medal in the event in round 1 of the 2002 Track World Cup in Mexico, many more medals followed but was to be her only gold.

In 2003, she held on to her title as pursuit national champion, and also won the national points race championship. She won both championships again in 2004, making her pursuit champion for four consecutive years.

Davies married Jason Jones in September 2005, and one month later in October 2005 she had her back broken in a hit and run incident near the velodrome in Manchester. Davies was worried she would never be able to cycle again, but resumed training on 10 January 2006. On 20 March that year, she competed in the pursuit at the 2006 Commonwealth Games in Melbourne, Australia, winning the bronze medal.

Davies rode for the Belgian team, and lived in Belgium in 2006 and 2007. In 2008, she signed a contract with Team Swift. She lived in Alsager, Staffordshire for a while but now lives in Llanychan near Ruthin.

Following her back injury, Davies established a charity, Emma's Spinal Hope, in order to raise money for research into spinal injuries. In 2010, Davies began working for the low cost airline easyJet as cabin crew. Currently, Davies lives in Paris, France and still works for easyJet but now holds the rank of Cabin Manager.

== Palmarès ==
=== Track ===
1998
3rd Pursuit, British National Track Championships
1999
2nd Pursuit, British National Track Championships
5th Pursuit, European Track Championships, Under 23
2000
2nd Pursuit, British National Track Championships
2001
1st (United Kingdom) Pursuit, British National Track Championships
2nd Pursuit, Round 1, Cali, 2001 Track World Cup
5th Pursuit, 2001 UCI Track Cycling World Championships
2002
1st (United Kingdom) Pursuit, British National Track Championships
1st Pursuit, Round 1, Mexico, 2002 Track World Cup
2nd British National Time Trial Championships
4th Pursuit, 2002 UCI Track Cycling World Championships
4th Pursuit, Commonwealth Games
2003
1st (United Kingdom) Pursuit, British National Track Championships
1st (United Kingdom) Points race, British National Track Championships
3th Scratch race, British National Track Championships
2004
1af (United Kingdom) Pursuit, British National Track Championships
1af (United Kingdom) Points race, British National Track Championships
4th Scratch race, British National Track Championships
3rd Pursuit, Round 2, Mexico, 2004 Track World Cup
2nd Pursuit, Round 3, Manchester, 2004 Track World Cup
4th Pursuit, Round 4 Sydney, 2004 Track World Cup
2nd Pursuit, Round 2, Los Angeles, 2004–2005 Track World Cup
3rd Scratch race, Round 2, Los Angeles, 2004–2005 Track World Cup
2005
2nd Pursuit, Round 3, Manchester, 2004–2005 Track World Cup
2006
3rd Pursuit, Commonwealth Games

== Road ==
1998
1st Manx International Women's race
2004
4th British National Road Race Championships
2005
1st Wortel-Horzvagel GP
2nd Stage 4, Tour De L'Aude
3rd British National Road Race Championships
