= Timeline of sport in Manchester =

This is a timeline of sport in Greater Manchester, a ceremonial county in northwestern England.

== 19th Century ==
=== 1810s ===
- 1816
  - Manchester Cricket Club is founded

=== 1840s ===
- 1842
  - First use of referee in football. For a match in Rochdale, between the Bodyguards club and the Fearnaught club

=== 1850s ===
- 1857
  - Old Trafford Cricket Ground is opened in Old Trafford, Manchester as the home of Manchester Cricket Club

=== 1860s ===
- 1864
  - Lancashire County Cricket Club is formally constituted at a meeting of thirteen Lancashire cricket clubs in Manchester, with Old Trafford Cricket Ground as its home base
- 1865
  - Lancashire County Cricket Club joins the County Championship and plays its initial important match against Middlesex at Old Trafford

=== 1870s ===
- 1874
  - Bolton Wanderers F.C. is formed
- 1878
  - Newton Heath LYR Football Club is formed by the Carriage and Wagon department of the Lancashire and Yorkshire Railway depot at Newton Heath, Manchester (later known as Manchester United F.C.)

=== 1880s ===
- 1880
  - St Mark's (West Gorton) football club is formed in Manchester
- 1883
  - Heaton Norris Rovers is formed (later to become Stockport County F.C.)
- 1884
  - 10–12 July – Old Trafford Cricket Ground hosts the first Ashes Test in England, which ends in a draw
- 1885
  - Bury F.C. is established

=== 1890s ===
- 1890
  - Heaton Norris Rovers are renamed Stockport County F.C.
- 1893
  - Manchester Football League is founded
- 1894
  - 31 March – Notts County F.C. defeat Bolton Wanderers 4–1 in the 1894 FA Cup Final
  - St Mark's (West Gorton) football club and Aldwick Association FC are renamed Manchester City F.C.
- 1895
  - Bury F.C. win the Second Division
  - Pine Villa F.C. is founded (later to become Oldham Athletic A.F.C.)
- 1899
  - Pine Villa F.C are renamed Oldham Athletic A.F.C.

== 20th Century ==
=== 1900s ===
- 1900
  - 21 April – Bury F.C. defeat Southampton F.C. 4–0 in the 1900 FA Cup Final
- 1902
  - J.H. Davies takes over near bankrupt Newton Heath (L&YR) F.C. and changes its name to Manchester United F.C.
- 1903
  - 18 April – Bury F.C. defeat Derby County F.C. 6–0 in the 1903 FA Cup Final
- 1904
  - 23 April – Manchester City F.C. defeat Bolton Wanderers F.C. 1–0 in the 1904 FA Cup Final, to win their first FA Cup
- 1907
  - Rochdale A.F.C is founded
- 1908
  - Manchester United F.C. win their first league (First Division) title
- 1909
  - 24 April – Manchester United defeat Bristol City F.C. 1–0 in the 1909 FA Cup Final, to win their first FA Cup
  - Manchester United win the inaugural Charity Shield

=== 1920s ===
- 1923
  - 28 April Bolton Wanderers defeat West Ham United F.C. 2–0 in the 1923 FA Cup Final, the first final to be held at Wembley, known as the White Horse Final
  - Manchester City move to Maine Road
- 1926
  - 24 April – Bolton Wanderers defeat Manchester City 1–0 in the 1926 FA Cup Final
  - Belle Vue Stadium is opened as a greyhound racing track in Belle Vue, Manchester. It has also been used for motorcycle speedway, as the home ground of Elite League team Belle Vue Aces from 1988 until 2015, and from 1999 until 2019 for stock car racing and banger racing
- 1928
  - White City Speedway (Manchester) is opened for dirt track racing
- 1929
  - 27 April – Bolton Wanderers defeat Portsmouth F.C. 2–0 in the 1929 FA Cup Final, to win the FA Cup for the third time

=== 1930s ===
- 1930
  - White City Speedway (Manchester) is closed
- 1932
  - Wigan Athletic F.C. is formed
- 1933
  - 29 April – Everton F.C. defeat Manchester City 3–0 in the 1933 FA Cup Final
- 1934
  - 28 April – Manchester City defeat Portsmouth F.C. 2–1 in the 1934 FA Cup Final
  - 84,569 watch Manchester City defeat Stoke City at Maine Road in the FA Cup 6th Round, the biggest crowd ever recorded for an English game outside of Wembley Stadium
- 1937
  - Manchester City win their first-ever league title
- 1938
  - Manchester City become the first and only defending Champions to be relegated

=== 1940s ===
- 1948
  - 17 January – 83,260 watch Manchester United vs Arsenal at Maine Road, to become the highest attendance at an English league game
  - 24 April – Manchester United defeat Blackpool F.C. 4–2 in the 1948 FA Cup Final, to end a 37-year trophy drought
- 1949
  - 24 May – Radcliffe F.C. is founded

=== 1950s ===
- 1952
  - Manchester United win their first top-flight title in 41 years under the guidance of Matt Busby
- 1953
  - 2 May – Blackpool F.C. defeat Bolton Wanderers 4–3 in the 1953 FA Cup Final, which is still known as the 'Matthews Final'
- 1955
  - 7 May – Newcastle United F.C. defeat Manchester City 3–1 in the 1955 FA Cup Final
  - Duncan Edwards, 18-year-old Manchester United wing-half, becomes England's youngest international when he plays in a side containing 40-year-old Stanley Matthews, who had played for England before Edwards was born
- 1956
  - 5 May – Manchester City defeat Birmingham City F.C. 3–1 in the 1956 FA Cup Final. German goalkeeper Bert Trautmann plays through the match despite suffering what an X-ray later confirms as a broken neck, and was able to continue his career
  - Manchester United win the league championship, becoming England's first representatives in the European Cup, in the competition's second season, as the previous league champions Chelsea were blocked from entering the inaugural tournament by the Football Association
- 1957
  - 4 May – Aston Villa F.C. defeat Manchester United 2–1 in the 1957 FA Cup Final
  - Manchester United win the league title for the second year running
- 1958
  - 6 February – In an incident known as the Munich air disaster, eight Manchester United players die and two more have their careers ended by injury after a plane crash at Munich-Riem Airport. Manager Matt Busby is badly injured and spends two months in hospital recovering from multiple injuries
  - 3 May – Bolton Wanderers defeat Manchester United 2–0 in the 1958 FA Cup Final
  - Former Manchester United and Manchester City winger Billy Meredith dies aged 83

=== 1960s ===
- 1960
  - Oldham Athletic, league runners-up 45 years earlier, finish second from bottom in the Fourth Division but retain their league status after the Football League's members vote for Gateshead to go down and Midland League champions Peterborough United to go up for the 1960–61 season
- 1961
  - Manchester City sell 21-year-old Scottish striker Denis Law to Torino of Italy in the first £100,000 deal involving a British club
- 1962
  - 26 April – Norwich City F.C. defeat Rochdale A.F.C 3–0 in the 1962 Football League Cup Final (first leg)
  - 1 May – Norwich City F.C. defeat Rochdale A.F.C 1–0 in the 1962 Football League Cup Final (second leg)
- 1963
  - 25 May – Manchester United defeat Leicester City F.C. 3–1 in the 1963 FA Cup Final, winning the FA Cup for the first time in 15 years and their first major trophy since the Munich air disaster five years earlier
  - Curzon Ashton F.C. is founded in Ashton-under-Lyne, Greater Manchester
- 1965
  - Manchester United win their first league title since the Munich air disaster
  - Eric Brook, all-time record goalscorer for Manchester City, dies at the age of 57
- 1966
  - Manchester United's Bobby Charlton is voted European Footballer of the Year
  - Ramsbottom United F.C. is founded
- 1967
  - Manchester United win the league championship – their fifth under Matt Busby and their seventh of all time, and last for the next 26 years, until the formation of the Premier League
  - Goalkeeper Harry Gregg leaves Manchester United after 10 years during which he established himself as one of the best goalkeepers in the English game, but with no medals to show for it: he had missed the 1963 FA Cup final due to injury and had not played enough games to qualify for a medal when United won the league in 1965 and 1967
- 1968
  - 29 May – Manchester United defeat S.L. Benfica 4–1 in 1968 European Cup Final
  - Manchester City wins the league championship for only the second time in their history
  - George Best, 22, is voted European Footballer of the Year after a brilliant season which was rounded off by scoring a goal in the European Cup final
  - Matt Busby is knighted after guiding Manchester United to the European Cup title
- 1969
  - 26 April – Manchester City defeat Leicester City F.C. 1–0 in the 1969 FA Cup Final
  - Sir Matt Busby retires after 24 years as manager of Manchester United and is replaced by 32-year-old reserve team coach Wilf McGuinness

=== 1970s ===
- 1970
  - 7 March – Manchester City defeat West Bromwich Albion F.C. 2–1 in the 1970 Football League Cup Final
  - 29 April – Manchester City defeat Górnik Zabrze 2-1 in the 1970 European Cup Winners' Cup Final
  - Wilf McGuinness is sacked after 18 months in charge of Manchester United. Sir Matt Busby takes control of first-team affairs until the end of the season
- 1971
  - 1 July – Manchester United appoint Leicester City F.C.'s Frank O'Farrell as their permanent successor to Wilf McGuinness
- 1972
  - December – Manchester United sack manager Frank O'Farrell and replace him with Scottish national coach Tommy Docherty
- 1973
  - 28 April – Scarborough F.C. defeat Wigan Athletic 2-1 in the 1973 FA Trophy Final
  - Bobby Charlton and Denis Law both leave Manchester United after long and illustrious careers
- 1974
  - 2 March – Wolverhampton Wanderers F.C. defeat Manchester City 2–1 in the 1974 Football League Cup Final
  - George Best finally leaves Manchester United after three years of uncertainty fuelled by off-the-field problems. He joins Stockport County
  - Manchester United are relegated to the Second Division for the first time since the 1930s. Their fate is ironically sealed when former player Denis Law scores the winning goal for Manchester City at Old Trafford with his final touch in league football, but Birmingham City's victory would have condemned them to relegation regardless of the outcome of United's game
- 1975
  - Manchester United are promoted back to the First Division one season after losing their top-flight status
- 1976
  - 28 February – Manchester City defeat Newcastle United F.C. 2–1 in the 1976 Football League Cup Final
  - 1 May – Southampton F.C. defeat Manchester United 1–0 in the 1976 FA Cup Final
- 1977
  - 21 May – Manchester United defeat Liverpool F.C. 2–1 in the 1977 FA Cup Final
  - 7–12 July – In the Second Test of the 1977 Ashes series at Old Trafford Cricket Ground England defeat Australia by 9 wickets
  - July – Tommy Docherty is sacked as manager of Manchester United just weeks after guiding them to FA Cup victory. He is replaced by Dave Sexton
- 1978
  - Wigan Athletic are elected to the Football League in place of Southport
- 1979
  - 12 May – Arsenal F.C. defeat Manchester United 3–2 in the 1979 FA Cup Final

=== 1980s ===
- 1980
  - Manchester United chairman Louis Edwards, 65, dies of a heart attack weeks after being accused of financial irregularities by ITV. Control of the club passes to his son Martin
- 1981
  - 9 May – Manchester City draw 1–1 with Tottenham Hotspur F.C. in the 1981 FA Cup Final
  - 14 May – Tottenham Hotspur defeat Manchester City 3–2 in the 1981 FA Cup Final replay
  - 13–17 August – In the Fifth Test of the 1981 Ashes series at Old Trafford Cricket Ground England defeat Australia by 103 runs
  - Ron Atkinson replaces Dave Sexton as manager of Manchester United. Three months after his appointment, West Bromwich Albion midfielder, Bryan Robson, follows his old manager to Old Trafford for an English record fee of £1.75 million
- 1983
  - 26 March – Liverpool F.C. defeat Manchester United 2–1 in the 1983 Football League Cup Final
  - 21 May – Manchester United draw 2–2 with Brighton & Hove Albion F.C. in the 1983 FA Cup Final
  - 26 May – Manchester United defeat Brighton and Hove Albion 4–0 in the 1983 FA Cup Final replay, to win their first major trophy under the management of Ron Atkinson
  - Sharp Electronics become the first official sponsors of Manchester United
  - Manchester United and England winger Steve Coppell retires from playing at the age of 28 due to a knee injury
- 1984
  - Manchester United sell England midfielder Ray Wilkins to A.C. Milan for £1.5 million and replace him with Scotland and Aberdeen's Gordon Strachan for £500,000
- 1985
  - 18 May – Manchester United defeat Everton F.C. 1–0 in the 1985 FA Cup Final
  - 1 June – Wigan Athletic defeat Brentford F.C. 3–1 in the 1985 Associate Members' Cup Final
  - 1–6 August – In the Fourth Test of the 1985 Ashes series at Old Trafford Cricket Ground Australia drew with England
- 1986
  - 24 May – Bristol City F.C. defeat Bolton Wanderers 3-0 in the 1986 Associate Members' Cup Final
  - November – Manchester United manager Ron Atkinson is sacked after a poor start to the season, and is replaced by the successful Aberdeen manager Alex Ferguson
- 1987
  - Alex Ferguson begins to rebuild Manchester United by signing Arsenal defender Viv Anderson, Celtic striker Brian McClair and Norwich City defender Steve Bruce
- 1988
  - Mark Hughes returns to Manchester United after two years away for a fee of £1.8 million
- 1989
  - 28 May – Bolton Wanderers defeat Torquay United F.C. 4-1 in the 1989 Associate Members' Cup Final
  - 27 July-1 August – In the Fourth Test of the 1989 Ashes series at Old Trafford Cricket Ground Australia defeat England by 9 wickets
  - Alex Ferguson makes a host of big-money signings for Manchester United in his latest attempt to win them their first league title since 1967, paying a total of more than £7 million for Mike Phelan, Neil Webb, Paul Ince, Gary Pallister and Danny Wallace

=== 1990s ===
- 1990
  - 29 April – Nottingham Forest F.C. defeat Oldham Athletic A.F.C. 1–0 in the 1990 Football League Cup Final
  - 12 May – Manchester United draw 3–3 with Crystal Palace F.C. in the 1990 FA Cup Final
  - 17 May – Manchester United defeat Crystal Palace 1–0 in the 1990 FA Cup Final replay, winning their first major trophy under the management of Alex Ferguson
  - Manchester United and Arsenal were respectively deducted 1 and 2 points, for a 21-man brawl involving their players on the pitch. The first and, so far, the only instances in English league history where a team were docked points for player misconduct
- 1991
  - 21 April – Sheffield Wednesday F.C. defeat Manchester United 1–0 in the 1991 Football League Cup Final
  - 15 May – Manchester United defeat FC Barcelona 2–1 in the 1991 European Cup Winners' Cup Final
  - 19 November – Manchester United defeat Red Star Belgrade 1-0 in the 1991 European Super Cup
- 1992
  - 12 April – Manchester United defeat Nottingham Forest F.C. 1–0 in the 1992 Football League Cup Final, winning the Football League Cup for the first time in their history
  - 16 May – Stoke City F.C. defeat Stockport County F.C. 1-0 in the 1992 Associate Members' Cup Final
  - After a slow start to the new Premier League campaign puts their league title hopes under serious doubt, Manchester United pay Leeds United £1.2million for French striker Eric Cantona in hope of winning a title race
- 1993
  - 22 May – Port Vale F.C. defeat Stockport County F.C. 2-1 in the 1993 Football League Trophy Final
  - 3–7 June – In the First Test of the 1993 Ashes series at Old Trafford Cricket Ground Australia defeat England by 179 runs
  - Manchester United win the inaugural Premiership title to end their 26-year wait for the league championship. They then paid a British record fee of £3.75 million for Nottingham Forest's Irish midfielder Roy Keane
- 1994
  - 27 March – Aston Villa F.C. defeat Manchester United 3–1 in the 1994 Football League Cup Final
  - 14 May – Manchester United defeat Chelsea F.C. 4–0 in the 1994 FA Cup Final to become only the fourth club in the 20th century to win the league championship and FA Cup double. They achieve this just four months after the death of former manager Sir Matt Busby at the age of 84. They are denied an unprecedented 'treble' by Aston Villa, who defeat them in the final of the League Cup
  - 14 September – Manchester Velodrome is opened
  - Club and former England captain Bryan Robson leaves Manchester United after 13 years to become player-manager of Middlesbrough
- 1995
  - January – Manchester United break the English transfer fee record by paying Newcastle United F.C. £7 million for striker Andy Cole
  - 2 April – Liverpool F.C. defeat Bolton Wanderers 2–1 in the 1995 Football League Cup Final
  - 20 May – Everton defeat Manchester United 1–0 in the 1995 FA Cup Final, to leave Manchester United without a major trophy for the first time since 1989
  - Manchester Storm ice hockey team is formed
  - Manchester United's French striker Eric Cantona is banned from football for 8 months and sentenced to 120 hours community service for kicking a Crystal Palace spectator at Selhurst Park
- 1996
  - 11 May – Manchester United defeat Liverpool F.C. 1–0 in the 1996 FA Cup Final, to win a unique second league championship and FA Cup double
  - 28 August-1 September – 1996 UCI Track Cycling World Championships held at Manchester Velodrome
- 1997
  - 3–7 July – In the Third Test of the 1997 Ashes series at Old Trafford Cricket Ground Australia defeat England by 268 runs
  - After captaining Manchester United to their fourth Premiership title in five seasons and 11th English League Championship overall, Eric Cantona announces his retirement as a player
  - Bolton Wanderers move into the Reebok Stadium, leaving Burnden Park, their home for 102 years
- 1998
  - Manchester City are relegated to the third tier of the English league for the first time in their history
- 1999
  - 18 April – Wigan Athletic F.C. defeat Millwall F.C. 1-0 in the 1999 Football League Trophy Final
  - 22 May – Manchester United defeat Newcastle United F.C. 2–0 in the 1999 FA Cup Final
  - 26 May – Manchester United defeat FC Bayern Munich 2-1 in the 1999 UEFA Champions League Final, to complete a unique treble of the Premier League title, FA Cup and UEFA Champions League, and manager Alex Ferguson is honoured with a knighthood
  - 27 August – S.S. Lazio defeat Manchester United 1-0 in the 1999 UEFA Super Cup
  - Wigan Athletic, who had played at Springfield Park since their formation in 1932, relocate to the new 25,000-seat JJB Stadium

== 21st Century ==
=== 2000s ===
- 2000
  - 26–30 August – 2000 UCI Track Cycling World Championships held at Manchester Velodrome
  - FA Cup holders Manchester United decline to defend their trophy, instead electing to take part in the inaugural FIFA Club World Championship
- 2001
  - Manchester United become only the fourth English club to win three successive league championships
  - Les Sealey, who kept goal for Manchester United in their FA Cup triumph of 1990 and the European Cup Winners' Cup triumph of 1991, dies of a heart attack aged 43
  - Manchester United break the national transfer fee record twice – first by paying PSV Eindhoven £19million for Dutch striker Ruud van Nistelrooy, and then by paying Lazio of Italy £28.1million for Argentine midfielder Juan Sebastián Verón
- 2002
  - Commonwealth Games held in Manchester
  - Manchester United break the British transfer record again by paying Leeds United £29million for central defender Rio Ferdinand
- 2003
  - 2 March – Liverpool F.C. defeat Manchester United 2–0 in the 2003 Football League Cup Final
  - Manchester United overhaul Arsenal during the final weeks of the season to claim their eighth Premiership title in eleven seasons
  - Manchester City leave Maine Road after 80 years and move into the 48,000-seat City of Manchester Stadium which had been constructed for the previous year's Commonwealth Games
- 2004
  - 29 February – Middlesbrough F.C. defeat Bolton Wanderers 2–1 in the 2004 Football League Cup Final
  - 22 May – Manchester United defeat Millwall F.C. 3–0 in the 2004 FA Cup Final, winning the FA Cup for an eleventh time
  - Everton striker Wayne Rooney, still only 18, becomes the world's most expensive teenager when he signs for Manchester United in a transfer deal which could eventually rise to £25million from an initial £20million
  - Middlesbrough beat Bolton Wanderers 2–1 in the League Cup final
- 2005
  - 21 May – After a 0–0 draw in the 2005 FA Cup Final Arsenal F.C. defeat Manchester United 5–4 on penalties
  - 11–15 August – In the Third Test of the 2005 Ashes series at Old Trafford Cricket Ground Australia drew with England
  - George Best, widely regarded one of the greatest footballers in the history of Manchester United and the footballing world, dies aged 59 after a short illness
  - Wigan Athletic reach the top division for the first time in their history after finishing runners-up in the Football League Championship
  - The Glazer takeover of Manchester United leads to disgruntled fans creating F.C. United of Manchester
- 2006
  - 26 February – Manchester United defeat Wigan Athletic F.C. 4–0 in the 2006 Football League Cup Final
  - March – Manchester Futsal Club is founded
  - In their first season as a top division club and only their 28th in the professional leagues, Wigan Athletic finish tenth and are League Cup runners-up to Manchester United
- 2007
  - 19 May – Chelsea F.C. defeat Manchester United 1–0 in the 2007 FA Cup Final to secure a cup double, in the first final at the new Wembley Stadium. Ryan Giggs set a new record for the player to appear in the most finals.
  - Manchester United win the Premiership for the ninth time under Alex Ferguson.
- 2008
  - 26–30 March – 2008 UCI Track Cycling World Championships held at Manchester Velodrome
  - 21 May – Manchester United draw 1-1 with Chelsea F.C., but win 6-5 on penalties, in the 2008 UEFA Champions League Final
  - 29 August – FC Zenit Saint Petersburg defeat Manchester United 2-1 in the 2008 UEFA Super Cup
  - Dimitar Berbatov completes a move to Manchester United from Tottenham Hotspur for £30.75 million
  - Manchester City are purchased by the Abu Dhabi United Group and on the same day broke the transfer record by purchasing Robinho of Brazil for £32million
  - Manchester United win the Premier League for the 10th time and overall 17th English League Championship. It is also the tenth title for manager Alex Ferguson (now the longest serving manager in English football with 22 years of unbroken service at the club) and Ryan Giggs, the only player to have collected title medals with all 10 of their championship winning sides since 1993
- 2009
  - 1 March – Manchester United draw 0–0 with Tottenham Hotspur F.C., but win 4–1 on penalties, in the 2009 Football League Cup Final, winning their third Football League Cup
  - 27 May – FC Barcelona defeat Manchester United 2-0 in the 2009 UEFA Champions League Final
  - Manchester United become the first team to win three consecutive top division titles on more than one occasion
  - Cristiano Ronaldo becomes the most expensive footballer in the world when Manchester United sell him to Real Madrid for £80million

=== 2010s ===
- 2010
  - 28 February – Manchester United defeat Aston Villa F.C. 2–1 in the 2010 Football League Cup Final
- 2011
  - 14 May – Manchester City defeat Stoke City 1–0 in the 2011 FA Cup Final, claiming a major trophy after 36 years
  - 28 May – FC Barcelona defeat Manchester United 3-1 in the 2011 UEFA Champions League Final
  - August – National Indoor BMX Arena is opened at Sportcity, Manchester
  - Manchester United win a record-setting 19th top-flight title
- 2012
  - Manchester City wins the Premier League title ahead of rivals Manchester United on goal difference, their 3rd overall English league win, and becomes the first team relegated from the Premier League to win the title. This was also their first English league title success since 1968
- 2013
  - 11 May – Wigan Athletic F.C. defeat Manchester City 1–0 in the 2013 FA Cup Final, to win the FA Cup for the first time, but are relegated from the Premier League, becoming the first FA Cup winners to be relegated in the same season as their Cup win
  - 1–5 August – In the Third Test of the 2013 Ashes series at Old Trafford Cricket Ground Australia drew with England. England retained The Ashes as a result
  - Alex Ferguson retires after winning Manchester United's 20th league title
- 2014
  - 2 March – Manchester City defeat Sunderland A.F.C. 3–1 in the 2014 Football League Cup Final
  - Louis van Gaal is confirmed as manager of Manchester United. Former interim manager Ryan Giggs is named as his assistant, and confirms his retirement as a player at the age of 40 after nearly a quarter of a century during which he played 963 games and won an English record of 22 major trophies.
  - Manchester City win their 2nd Premier League title
- 2016
  - 28 February – Manchester City draw 1–1 with Liverpool F.C., but win 3–1 on penalties, in the 2016 Football League Cup Final
  - 21 May – Manchester United defeat Crystal Palace F.C. 2–1 in the 2016 FA Cup Final, to equal Arsenal F.C.'s record 12 FA Cups
  - Manchester United sack manager Louis van Gaal despite winning the FA Cup, after a poor league season. Former Chelsea manager Jose Mourinho is appointed in his place
- 2017
  - 26 February – Manchester United defeat Southampton F.C. 3–2 in the 2017 EFL Cup Final
  - 24 May – Manchester United defeat AFC Ajax 2-0 in the 2017 UEFA Europa League Final. Jose Mourinho becomes the only Manchester United manager to win a major trophy in his first season, with a League Cup and Europa League double
  - 8 August – Real Madrid CF defeat Manchester United 2-1 in the 2017 UEFA Super Cup
- 2018
  - 25 February – Manchester City defeat Arsenal F.C. 3–0 in the 2018 EFL Cup Final
  - 14 March – Arsenal W.F.C. defeat Manchester City W.F.C. 1-0 in the 2018 FA WSL Cup Final
  - 19 May – Chelsea F.C. defeat Manchester United 1–0 in the 2018 FA Cup Final
  - Manchester City win the Premier League title and become the first club to win the Premier League with 100 points
  - Salford City Lionesses is founded
- 2019
  - 23 February – Manchester City W.F.C. draw 0-0 with Arsenal W.F.C., but win 4-2 on penalties, in the 2019 FA WSL Cup Final
  - 24 February – Manchester City draw 0–0 with Chelsea F.C., but win 4–3 on penalties, in the 2019 EFL Cup Final
  - 18 May – Manchester City defeat Watford 6–0 in the 2019 FA Cup Final, becoming the first English team to win a domestic treble (FA Cup, EFL Cup and Premier League)
  - 27 August – Bury F.C. is expelled from the English Football League due to inability to furnish proof of its financial viability.
  - 4–8 September – In the Fourth Test of the 2019 Ashes series at Old Trafford Cricket Ground Australia defeat England by 185 runs to retain The Ashes
  - December – Bury A.F.C. is founded
  - Manchester City become the first team to win back-to-back Premier League titles since Manchester United in 2009

=== 2020s ===
- 2020
  - 1 March – Manchester City defeat Aston Villa F.C. 2–1 in the 2020 EFL Cup Final
  - 27 November – Bury F.C. enter administration
- 2021
  - 13 March – Salford City F.C. draw 0-0 with Portsmouth F.C., but win 4-2 on penalties, in the 2020 EFL Trophy Final
  - 25 April – Manchester City defeat Tottenham Hotspur F.C. 1–0 in the 2021 EFL Cup Final, winning the EFL Cup for the fourth consecutive season and eighth in total
  - 26 May – Villarreal CF draw 1-1 with Manchester United, but win 11-10 on penalties, in the 2021 UEFA Europa League Final
  - 29 May – Chelsea F.C. defeat Manchester City 1–0 in 2021 UEFA Champions League Final
  - Manchester City win their seventh Premier League title
  - Jack Grealish becomes the most expensive English footballer of all time after a transfer to Manchester City for £100 million
- 2022
  - 5 March – Manchester City W.F.C. defeat Chelsea F.C. Women 3-1 in the 2022 FA Women's League Cup Final
  - Manchester City F.C. win the Premier League for the 8th time
