= Sport in Manchester =

Manchester City and Manchester United are popular Premier League football clubs in Greater Manchester. United's ground is in Old Trafford; Manchester City's home ground is the City of Manchester Stadium in east Manchester. Fixtures between the clubs are referred to as the Manchester Derby.

Manchester United are historically the second most successful football club in England with 67 elite honours won (including three European Cups) and was the first team in England to achieve the Continental treble. Manchester United's revenue was the fifth highest of a football club in the world in the 2022–23 season at €745.8 million. In 2023, Forbes estimated the club was the second most valuable in the world at $6 billion.

Manchester City have won ten domestic league titles, most recently in 2024. Under the management of Pep Guardiola in winning the Premier League in 2018, they became the only Premier League team to attain 100 points in a single season. In 2019, they won four trophies, completing an unprecedented sweep of all domestic trophies in England and is the first English men's team to win the Domestic treble. In 2023, they became the second English team to win the Continental treble. This makes Manchester the only city in Europe to have two continental treble winning teams. Manchester City's revenue was the second highest of a football club in the world in the 2022–23 season at €825.9 million. In 2023, Forbes estimated the club was the fifth most valuable in the world at $4.99 billion.

Manchester has hosted every major domestic, continental and international football competition, including the World Cup in 1966, the European Championship in 1996, Olympic Football in 2012, the 2003 UEFA Champions League Final, the 2008 UEFA Cup Final, 1893, 1911, 1915 and 1970 FA Cup Finals and 1977, 1978 and 1984 Football League Cup Final.

Lancashire County Cricket Club, formed in 1865 to replace Manchester Cricket Club, play at Old Trafford cricket ground.

Manchester has competed twice to host the Olympic Games, being beaten into fourth place by Atlanta in 1996 and coming third to Sydney in 2000. Manchester hosted the 2002 Commonwealth Games with many sporting facilities being built for them, including the City of Manchester Stadium, the Manchester Velodrome, the National Squash Centre and the Manchester Aquatics Centre.

== Football ==
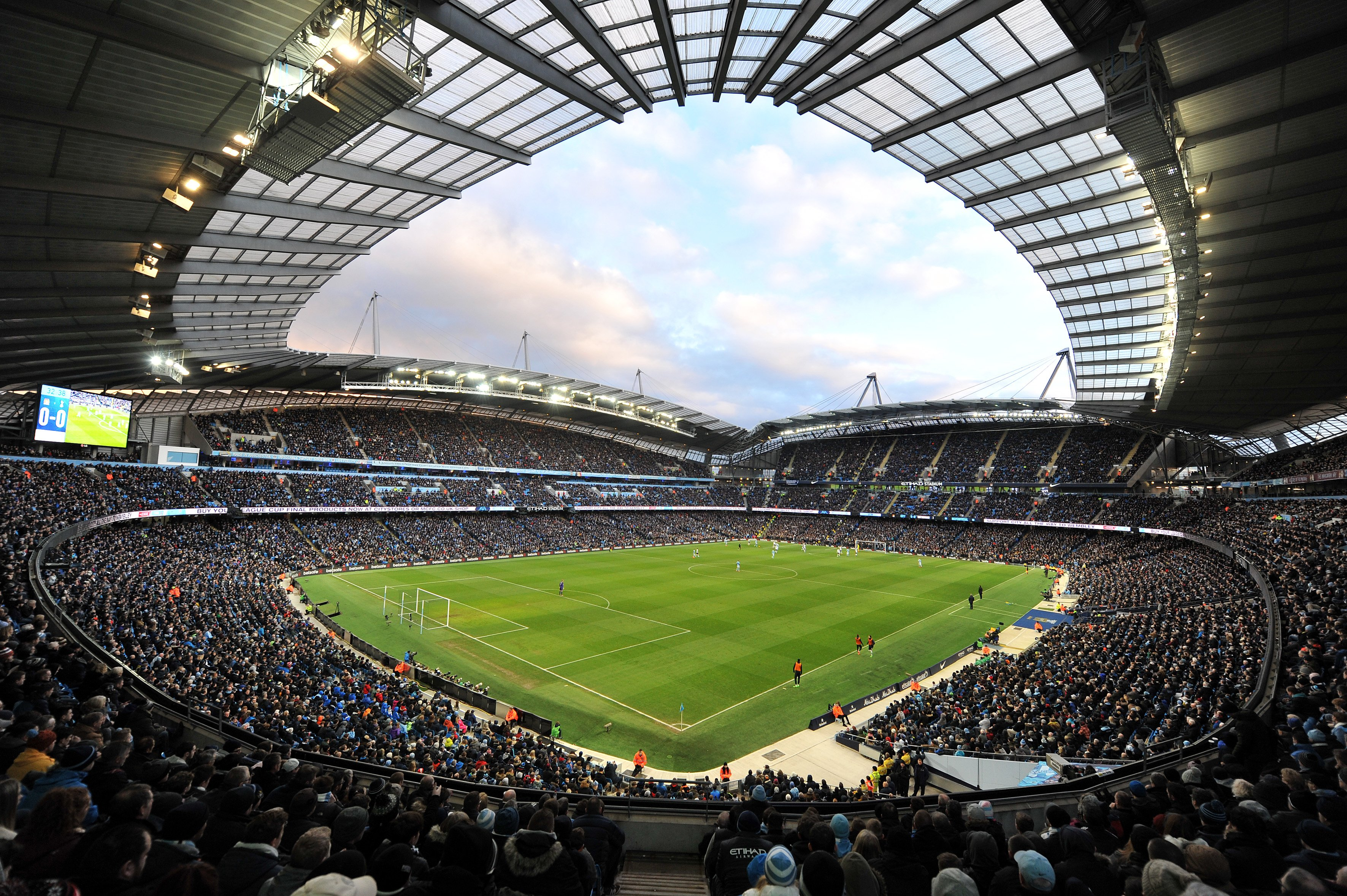
City of Manchester Stadium, home to Manchester City F.C.

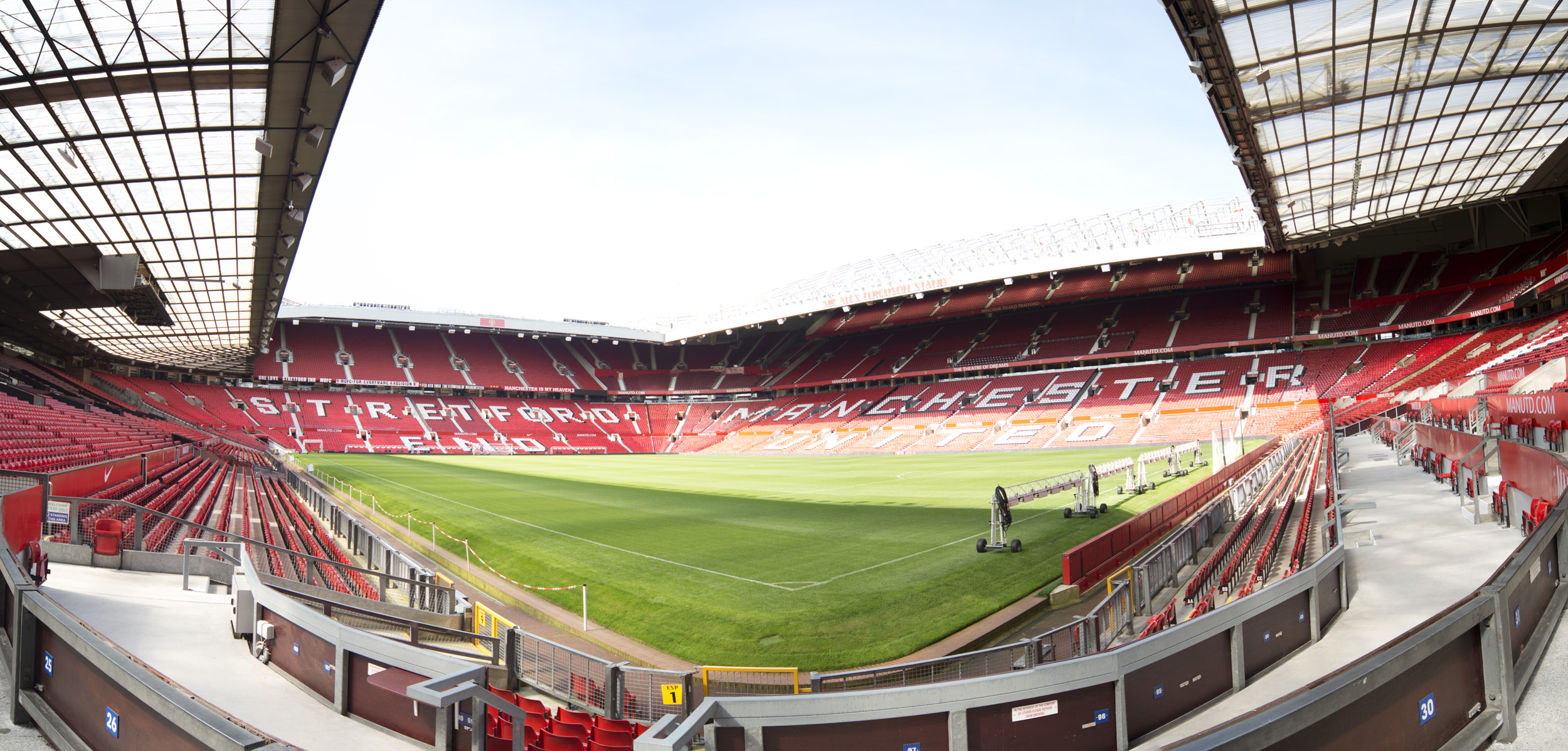
Old Trafford, home to Manchester United F.C. who are situated in Trafford.

Two Premier League football clubs, Manchester United and Manchester City, bear the city's name. Manchester City's home ground, the City of Manchester Stadium, is two miles outside Manchester city centre in east Manchester and Manchester United's, Old Trafford, the largest club football ground in the United Kingdom, on the west side two miles from the city centre.

Both City and United, as of 2001, had a highly localised fanbase with the majority of season ticket holding fans in the outer postal areas (BL, OL, SK, and WA) of Greater Manchester and within other counties of the North-west Only a fraction of both clubs' respective season ticket subscribers came from within the central areas of the City of Manchester. The Manchester postal area includes the (strongly United supporting) City of Salford but also Prestwich and Whitefield in Bury (with one of the largest City supporters clubs). This research was conducted before City moved to the larger (48,000 capacity) City of Manchester Stadium, and before the expansion of United's Old Trafford stadium which now accommodates 76,000 meaning that the situation will have changed in the period since it was written.

Further research, published in 2008, has identified that the Manchester region is split with City's support predominantly coming in the south and east of Greater Manchester and the surrounding area and United's in the west. United's nationwide and international support far exceeds that of City. Polls done in the local media suggest that the support of both clubs is split nearly 50/50 within the city and United edging out City with a small majority in all of Greater Manchester.

Aside from their two Premier League clubs, Manchester's earliest known association football club was Hulme Athenaeum, established in November 1863 with its first secretary being Jonathan Nall. Manchester hosted the first meeting of representatives from the home nations football associations in 1886, and the International Football Association Board, which makes the rules for the game, was formed following this meeting. FIFA adopted the rules and regulations of football laid out by the IFAB when the organisation formed in 1904. Manchester has remained a regular summit location for IFAB meetings since their formation.

Manchester also hosts several other smaller semi-pro and amateur football clubs, the most notable of which is F.C. United of Manchester, who are based at Broadhurst Park in Moston, an area less than three miles north of the city centre. They play in the 6th tier of English football in the National League North after being promoted from NPL Premier Division.

The Manchester Football League is the official amateur football league of Manchester.

== Athletics ==
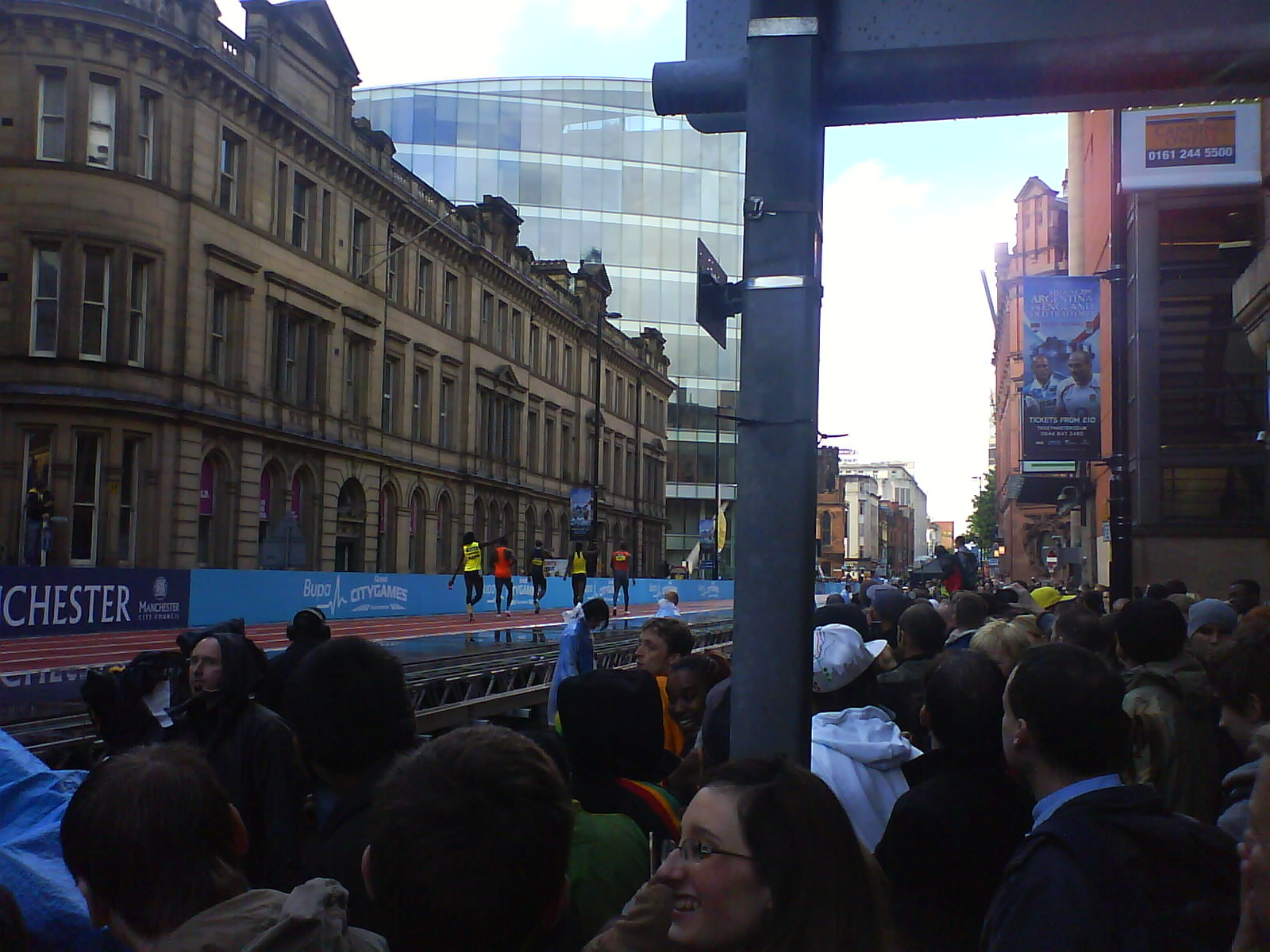
The Great Manchester Run was established in 2003 and the Great City Games was established in 2009

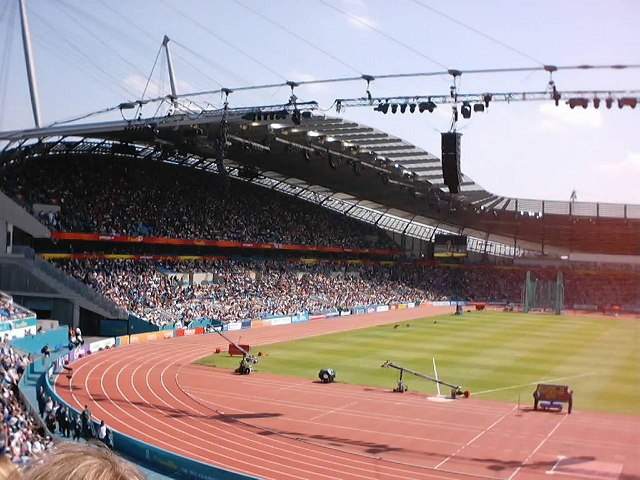
Manchester City's City of Manchester Stadium during the Commonwealth Games

The city hosted the 2002 Commonwealth Games, and athletics events took place at the City of Manchester Stadium, which is now home to Manchester City and sometimes referred to as Eastlands. Next to Eastlands lies the Manchester Regional Arena, which has been used for British athletics trials and the annual Paralympic World Cup which has been held in Manchester since 2005.

The city also hosts the annual Great Manchester Run which has been hosted since 2003 and has become one of the most popular 10 km runs in the UK. In addition, the city also hosts the annual Great City Games, featuring a 110m sprint track on Deansgate in Manchester city centre. The world's top athletes are invited and in 2009 Usain Bolt took part.

The Manchester Area Cross Country League, taking place every winter, hosts adult and child runners in multiple parks around Greater Manchester and Merseyside.

== Rugby League ==
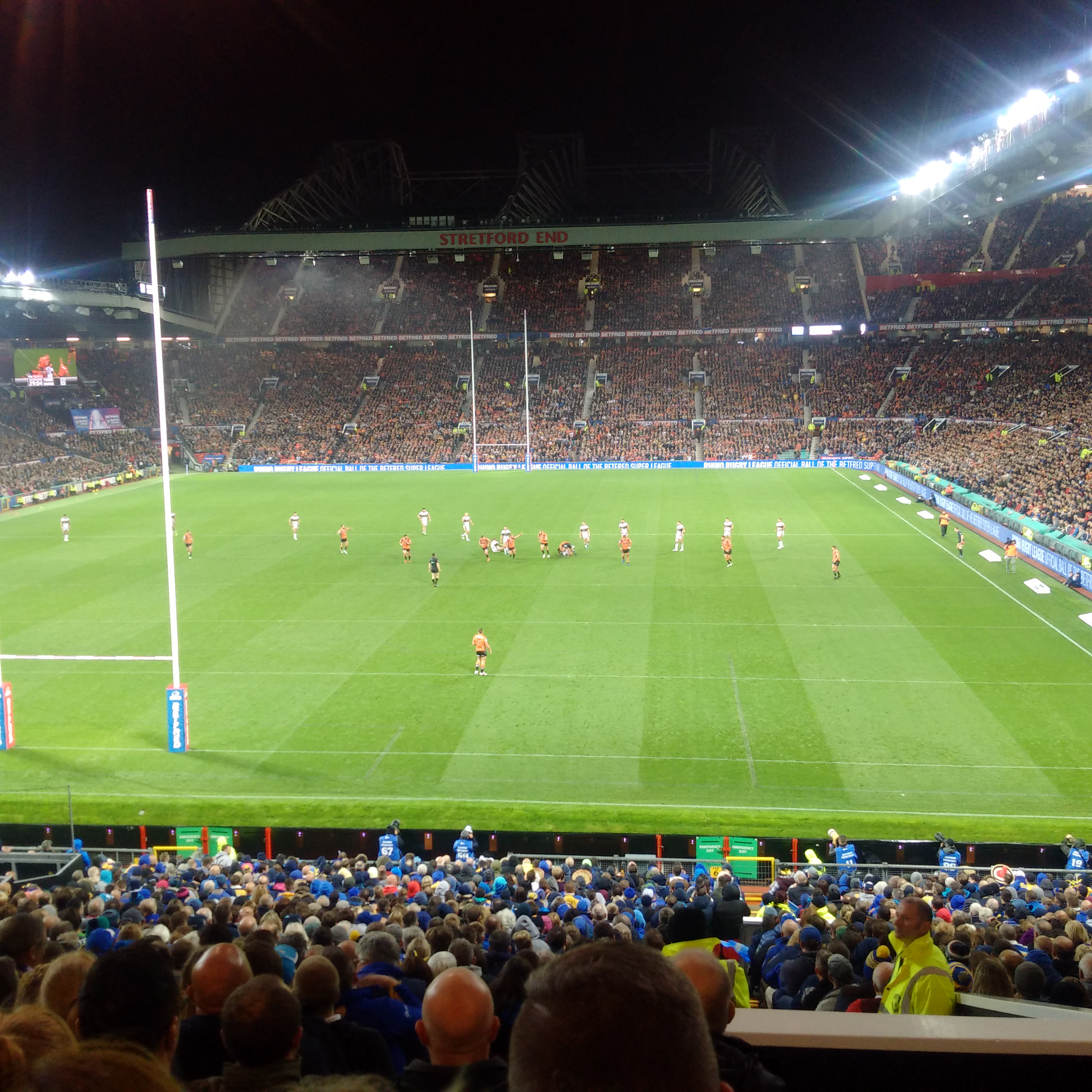
Manchester United's Old Trafford, the home of the Super League Grand Final

Manchester is a city that is steeped in Rugby League tradition, although the borough hadn't been home a professional Rugby League club based since the Belle Vue Rangers disbanded as a club after the 1954–55 season. The club started out as Broughton Rangers in 1877.

With in the county of Greater Manchester, there are six professional clubs: Wigan Warriors, Salford Red Devils, Leigh Leopards (all of the Super League), Oldham Roughyeds (of the RFL Championship), and Swinton Lions and Rochdale Hornets (both of the RFL League 1). The first of these, Wigan Warriors, is the United Kingdom's most successful rugby league side having won 22 league championships, 19 cup titles, and 4 world championships.

Old Trafford is home to the Super League Grand Final and has hosted it every year since its inception (except for 2020 due to COVID-19), and also hosted its predecessor tournament, the Rugby League Premiership final, every year since 1987. The stadium had hosted three world cup finals in 2000, 2013, and 2021, with other stadiums in the county also hosting several world cup matches throughout history.

Canadian side Toronto Wolfpack used to complete in the British rugby league system. Their United Kingdom base was the Manchester Metropolitan University. In 2018 the Wolfpack and MMU jointly established a player development pathway in which the Wolfpack coach the MMU's university team, operate youth programs in both Manchester and Toronto, and encourage top young rugby talent from Toronto to pursue the sport in Manchester.

The city also has several amateur clubs including Manchester Rangers and Mancunians RL.

== Rugby Union ==
Sale Sharks are the professional rugby union club which represents Manchester and the North West in England's top flight rugby union competition, Premiership Rugby. They play at the Salford Community Stadium in Greater Manchester having previously played at Edgeley Park in Stockport and at Heywood Road. Heywood Road is still used by the National League 1 side Sale FC.

Manchester Rugby Club was founded as Manchester Football Club in 1860, eleven years before the formation of the Rugby Football Union. The club is one of the oldest rugby union clubs in the world, along with Blackheath Rugby Club and Liverpool St Helens F.C. The club's ground is at Grove Park in Cheadle Hulme. See main article: Manchester Rugby Club

Broughton Park Rugby Union F.C. is one of the oldest rugby union clubs in England and was established in 1882, just one year after the Lancashire County Rugby Union was founded and eleven years after the formation of the national Rugby Football Union. The club has had a number of different grounds in its time, mainly in the Salford/Prestwich area, but also in the south of Manchester. Since 2004, it has played at Hough End in Chorlton-cum-Hardy.

Old Bedians Rugby (Union) Club was founded in 1954 as an Old Boys club for St Bedes College. Originally based in Chorlton, Old Bedians became one of two Didsbury rugby clubs in 1965. The club is on Millgate Lane in Didsbury Village.

Didsbury Toc-H Rugby (Union) Club was founded in 1924 as "Toc H Manchester" in Victoria Park. After moving to various sites, the club arrived in Didsbury and in 1986 the name was changed to "Didsbury Toc-H" to identify with the clubhouse at Ford Lane in the Didsbury Village. "Toc-H" comes from a soldiers' club at Poperinghe in Flanders in the First World War. Soldiers and officers could get a respite from the battlefields. This place was named Talbot House in honour of a young lieutenant who was killed in action the year before. Signallers pronounced the letters 'T' as 'Toc' and 'H' as 'House'. When the rugby club was founded, Manchester soldiers called the new club as "Toc-H Manchester".

Burnage Rugby Club play in National 3 and are based near Parrs Wood Entertainment Complex.

Manchester also has other rugby union teams: the University of Manchester Rugby Club, and Manchester Village Spartans RUFC

New to the Manchester rugby scene is East Manchester RUFC. Also known as the Rhinos. Created in 2024. East Manchester RUFC is already a fan favourite match up with most of the amateur teams in and surrounding Manchester, with games being watched with huge crowds and high scores. Their two highest wins are currently a 129-5 home win over Old Bedians Rugby Club and a 0-100 away win over Sale FC.

== Swimming ==
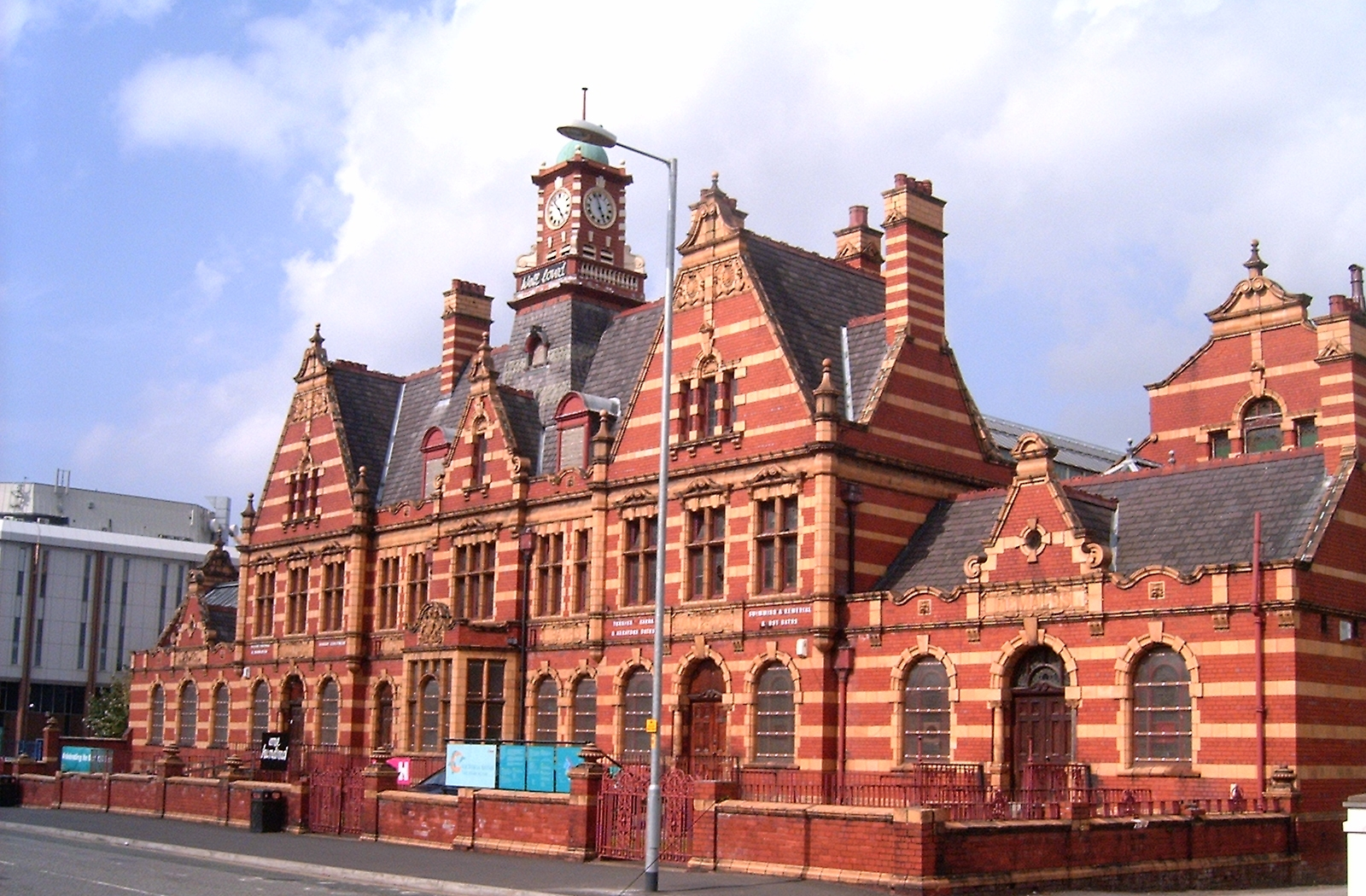
Victoria Baths

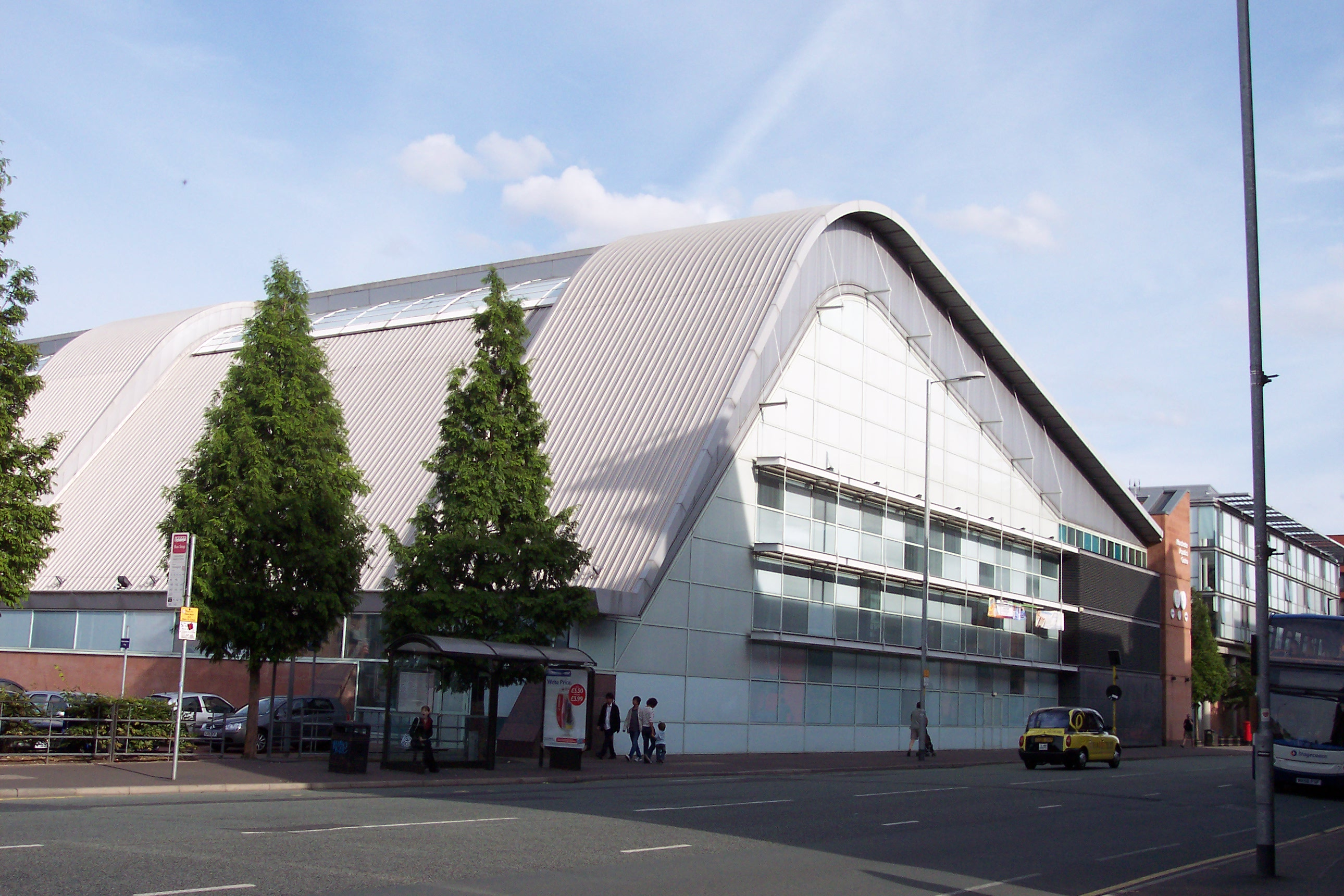
The Manchester Aquatics Centre

Victoria Baths are in Chorlton-on-Medlock.

Manchester has an Olympic-standard swimming pool in the Manchester Aquatics Centre, built for the 2002 Commonwealth Games, which is now part of the University of Manchester. The university runs the University of Manchester Swimming Club at the aquatics centre which was formed in 1885.

Manchester has a number of swimming clubs. The City of Manchester Aquatic Swim Team based at the Aquatic Centre and they run academy sessions throughout Manchester.

== Cricket ==
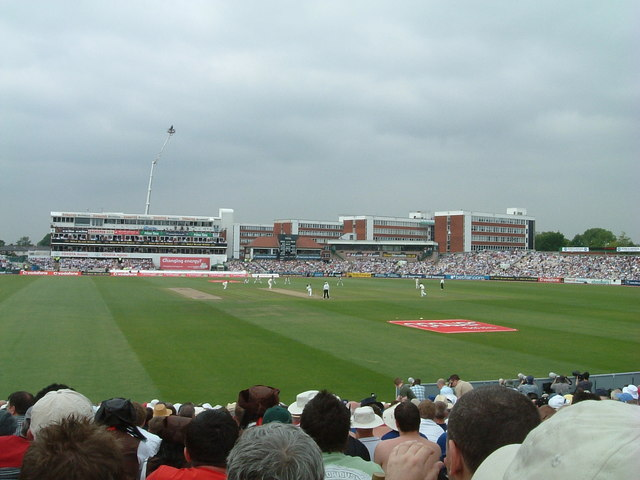
Old Trafford Cricket Ground, formerly home to Manchester Cricket Club which later became Lancashire County Cricket Club

Old Trafford cricket ground, in the Metropolitan Borough of Trafford, was originally the home of Manchester Cricket Club, but became the home of Lancashire County Cricket Club in 1864 upon the club's formation. Built in 1856, the ground is on Talbot Road, Stretford.

A test match venue since 1884, the 155-year-old ground is one of the most famous in world cricket, only The Oval in London can claim to have hosted an England test match earlier and the ground has hosted three World Cup semi-finals. The ground has seen many Ashes moments, including the 1902 Ashes test where Australia won by 3 runs (the closest test match winning margin and one which stood for nearly a century until 1993), "Jim Laker Test" in July 1956 where the England spinner took 19 wickets, Shane Warne's "Ball of the Century" against Mike Gatting and more recently the tense 2005 Ashes Test at Old Trafford when more than 20,000 fans had to be turned away due to tickets being sold out.

Redevelopment plans have existed since the early 2000s (decade) as the cricket ground was in need of renovation, and even a move away to Sportcity nearby Manchester City F.C.'s City of Manchester Stadium was touted as a serious possibility. Nearly £25m is expected to be invested in the redevelopments at Old Trafford. Similar to its counterpart, one end of the Old Trafford cricket ground is called the Stretford End, the other end of the ground is called the Brian Statham end.

Lancashire hold the record for the most tournament wins in the Pro40 tournament (5 times) which ran from 1969 to 2009 and the Friends Provident Trophy (7 times) which ran from 1963 to 2009. Despite this strong one-day success, Lancashire have not won the top tier of the County Championship since 1934. In total they have won the County Championship on eight occasions in 1881, 1897, 1904, 1926, 1927, 1928, 1930 and 1934. However, they still remain one of the top county cricket clubs in the country and Lancashire maintains a healthy rivalry with Yorkshire, which is sometimes referred to as the Battle of the Roses (a pun on the actual War of the Roses which involved Lancashire and Yorkshire on opposing sides).

== Cycling ==
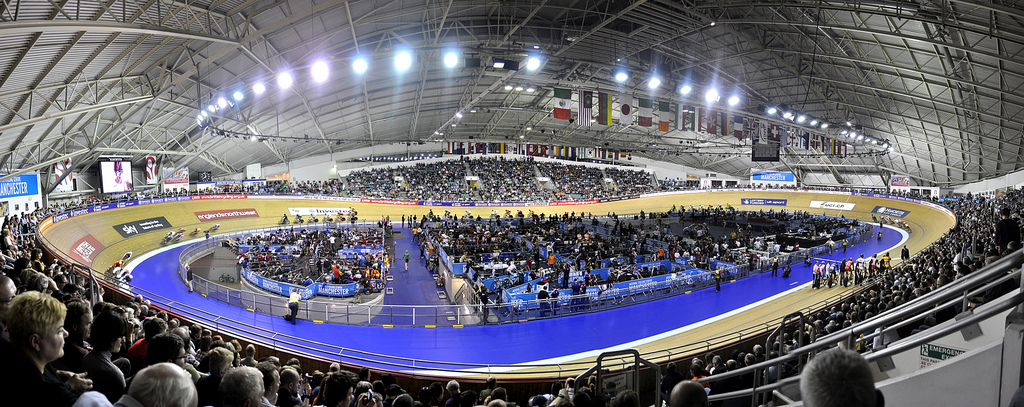
A panorama of the Manchester Velodrome

The National Cycling Centre includes a velodrome, BMX Arena and Mountainbike trials and is the home of British Cycling, UCI ProTeam Team Sky and Sky Track Cycling. The Manchester Velodrome is the UK's first purpose-built indoor Cycling Velodrome, which was primarily built for the 2002 Commonwealth Games. It is near the City of Manchester Stadium. British Cycling have stated their wish to remain based in Manchester, instead of moving to The London Velopark for the 2012 Summer Olympics, as development continues with the construction of a National BMX Arena next to British Cycling's base at the Manchester Velodrome.

The Velodrome has become one of the fastest velodrome tracks in the world and its board tracks consist of 80 kilometres of 40mm Siberian pine on 380 trusses around the velodrome track. The Velodrome is covered by a 122-metre arched roof enabling unrestricted viewing for the spectators. The Velodrome has hosted the UCI World Championships which is the set of world championship events for the various disciplines and distances in track cycling and are regulated by the Union Cycliste Internationale 3 times in 1996, 2000 and 2008 - no other venue has hosted more.

Fallowfield Stadium was an athletics stadium and velodrome in Fallowfield which opened in May 1892 as the home of Manchester Athletic Club after it was forced to move from its home next to Old Trafford Cricket Ground. Fallowfield was most regularly used for cycling by the Manchester Wheelers' Club, who held their annual competition there until 1976.

== Speedway racing ==
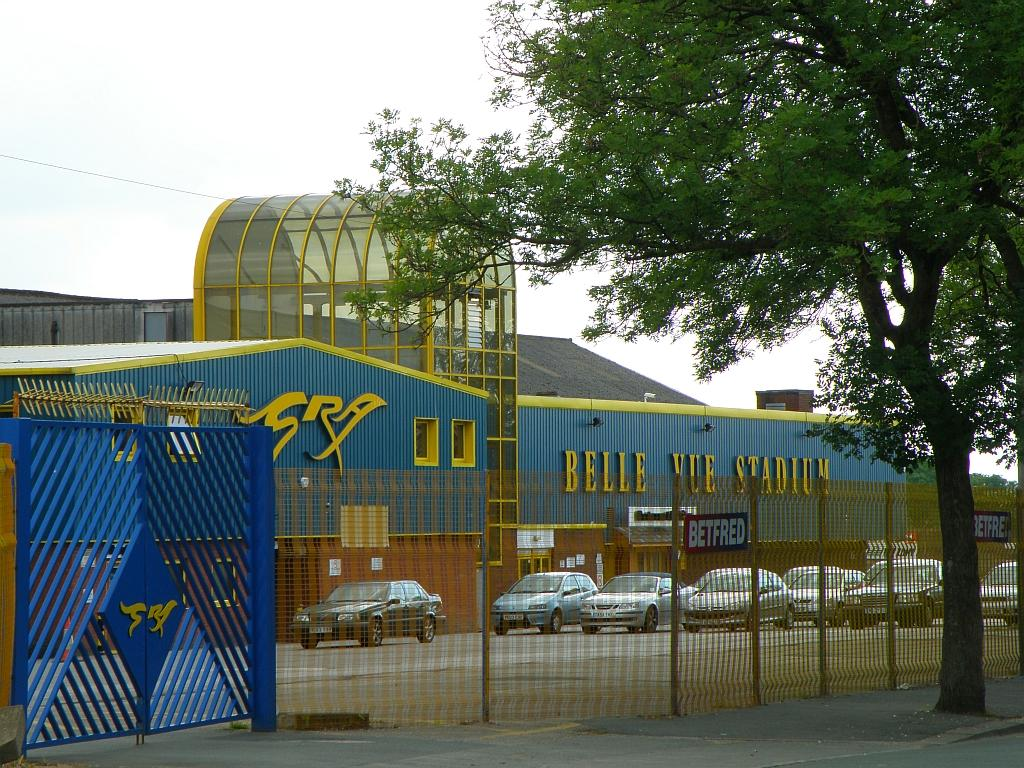
Belle Vue Stadium where Belle Vue Aces speedway racing and greyhound racing takes place

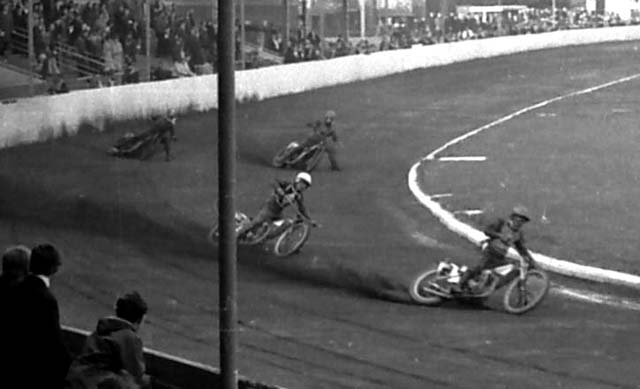
Speedway racing at Belle Vue in 1963

Motorcycle speedway racing has been staged at five venues in Manchester. The first events were staged at the greyhound stadium in Kirkmanshume Lane in 1928 and was known as Belle Vue Speedway. Speedway activities continued under the Belle Vue name at the purpose-built stadium in Hyde Road from 1929 to 1987, without any breaks even during the war years of 1939 - 1945, when the stadium was sold and redeveloped. Speedway racing returned to the greyhound stadium in Kirkmanshume Lane in 1988 and continued there until 2015. In 2016 the new £10m National Speedway Stadium with a 6,000 capacity was opened next door to the old greyhound stadium on Kirkmanshulme Lane. The speedway team are known as the Belle Vue Aces. Peter Craven, Ove Fundin, Ivan Mauger, Peter Collins and Jason Crump are amongst the riders who have won World Championships when riding for the Aces. The White City stadium was used in the pioneer days from 1928 to 1930 and a training track at Newton Heath operated in the early post war period.

== Basketball ==
Manchester has a strong history and modern day presence with basketball. The Manchester Giants compete in the nationwide, franchise based British Basketball League, and have done so since their rebirth in 2012. They play their home games at the Trafford Powerleague Arena and are coached by Manchester basketball legend Yorick Williams, who is in his second year in charge of the club.

The Manchester Magic were originally formed as the reserve side of the former Manchester Giants. Since the formal separation soon after, the Magic have flourished, and are current champions of the second tier English Basketball League Division 1, and play their home games at the Amaechi Basketball Centre, built with the support of former NBA player John Amaechi. Both clubs have strong youth development programs across Greater Manchester.

In 2016, Basketball England opened their new National Basketball Performance Centre in Belle Vue, Manchester, comprising the best practice facilities available for the national teams, and retractable seating for 2000. The centre hosted the GB Women's Eurobasket qualifiers against Albania and Montenegro.

== Other sports ==
=== Team games ===
The Manchester Titans are an American football club whose first team played in the BAFA National Leagues. They are the largest American football club in Great Britain, having Adult Contact, Adult Flag, Women's Contact, Women's Flag, U19 Contact, two U17 contact, U17 flag and U12 flag teams. All teams compete in the highest available divisions, in 2017 the Adult Contact team won the Division 1 National Title, the Adult Flag team winning the MEC North Division, the U19 team finishing runners-up in the Britbowl Trophy and the U17 South team finishing as undefeated North Division Champions. The Titans play at the National Speedway Stadium at Belle Vue.

In 2010, Manchester Metropolitan University introduced an American football team known as the MMU Eagles.

Manchester also has two ice hockey teams - Manchester Storm and Altrincham Aces both playing out of the Altrincham Ice Dome in Altrincham. In addition, Manchester previously hosted the Manchester Phoenix based in Deeside, North Wales. The city was also home to a previous incarnation of the Manchester Storm ice hockey club who, in 1997, played in front of the largest audience ever to watch an ice hockey game in UK when 17,245 people saw the Storm defeat the Sheffield Steelers 6–2 at the MEN Arena. In 2015 Manchester Storm returned to represent the City of Manchester in the 10-team Elite Ice Hockey League.

Manchester plays host to the Netball Superleague team Manchester Thunder. Founded in 2001 as Northern Thunder they have won 4 Netball Superleague titles including an invincible season in the 2022 Netball Superleague.

Manchester also has two roller hockey teams, which have combined and reached the cup final against Bury St. Edmunds (at U13 level only).

The Manchester Bees Dodgeball Club, a dodgeball team, was formed in 2013. In the club's first season, it won the Division 1 North UK Dodgeball League.

=== Rowing ===
Manchester is home to four British Rowing affiliated clubs. Manchester University Boat Club and Trafford Rowing Club are located on the Bridgewater Canal in Sale, Greater Manchester, whilst the Salford Quays plays host to Agecroft Rowing Club along with Salford University Boat Club.

=== Miscellany ===
Belle Vue National Speedway Stadium in Gorton is home to the Belle Vue Aces speedway team.

Manchester is also home to two women's roller derby teams, the Rainy City Roller Derby and Manchester Roller Derby, the latter also has a men's and junior roller derby team. The sport continues to grow in the UK and Manchester and roller derby bouts held in Manchester regularly sell out as of 2011.

In 1998, Joanna Thomas she moved to Manchester to being train at Betta Bodies, one of England's top hardcore gyms. She got help from Kerry Kayes, a bodybuilder, owner of Betta Bodies and one of the United Kingdom's top bodybuilding gurus, and Diane Royle, a former Olympic javelin thrower and bodybuilder. At 1998 EFBB Northeast Qualifier, she would again win the middleweight category and quality for the British Championships. Within 6 months of her leaving her education pursuit, at the 1998 EFBB British Championships, Joanna won the lightweight category and overall title and became the youngest British female bodybuilder to ever to win an IFBB pro card at the age of 21 years old. Her record remains unbroken to this day. She spent the next 2 years in Manchester honing her physique, packing on more size, improving her shape and increasing her muscle maturity. In the spring of 2001 she began preparing for her professional debut at the 2001 Jan Tana Classic. In 2001, she left Manchester for Lynchburg, Virginia in order to compete at the 2001 Jan Tana Classic.

=== Combat sports ===
Boxing is popular in Manchester. World champion boxers who come from Greater Manchester include WBA lightweight champion Anthony Crolla; IBF, WBA and WBO heavyweight champion Tyson Fury; and IBF and WBA super lightweight, and WBA welterweight champion Ricky Hatton.

Manchester has also hosted several events for World Wrestling Entertainment, as professional wrestling is not only popular in Manchester, but in the United Kingdom as a whole. Manchester is also the home of The British Bulldogs Davey Boy Smith and The Dynamite Kid.

==== Ludosport (International Light Saber Combat Academy) ====
Ludosport, is an International Lightsaber Combat Academy, teaching light saber combat (inspired by the iconic weapon from the Star Wars movies) as an international competitive sport.

Classes started in Manchester in January 2018 and pupils train on a weekly basis, with local instructors who have trained with the parent organisation in Italy "Ludosport International".

They regularly hold introductory "Discovery" Sessions where people can come along to try the sport.

The local classes are part of the UK network of Ludosport UK.

During the COVID-19 lockdown, all classes and competitions were suspended, but it is expected that lessons with good social distancing practices will be resumed (local conditions permitting) during the Autumn of 2021.

== Major sporting events hosted in Manchester ==
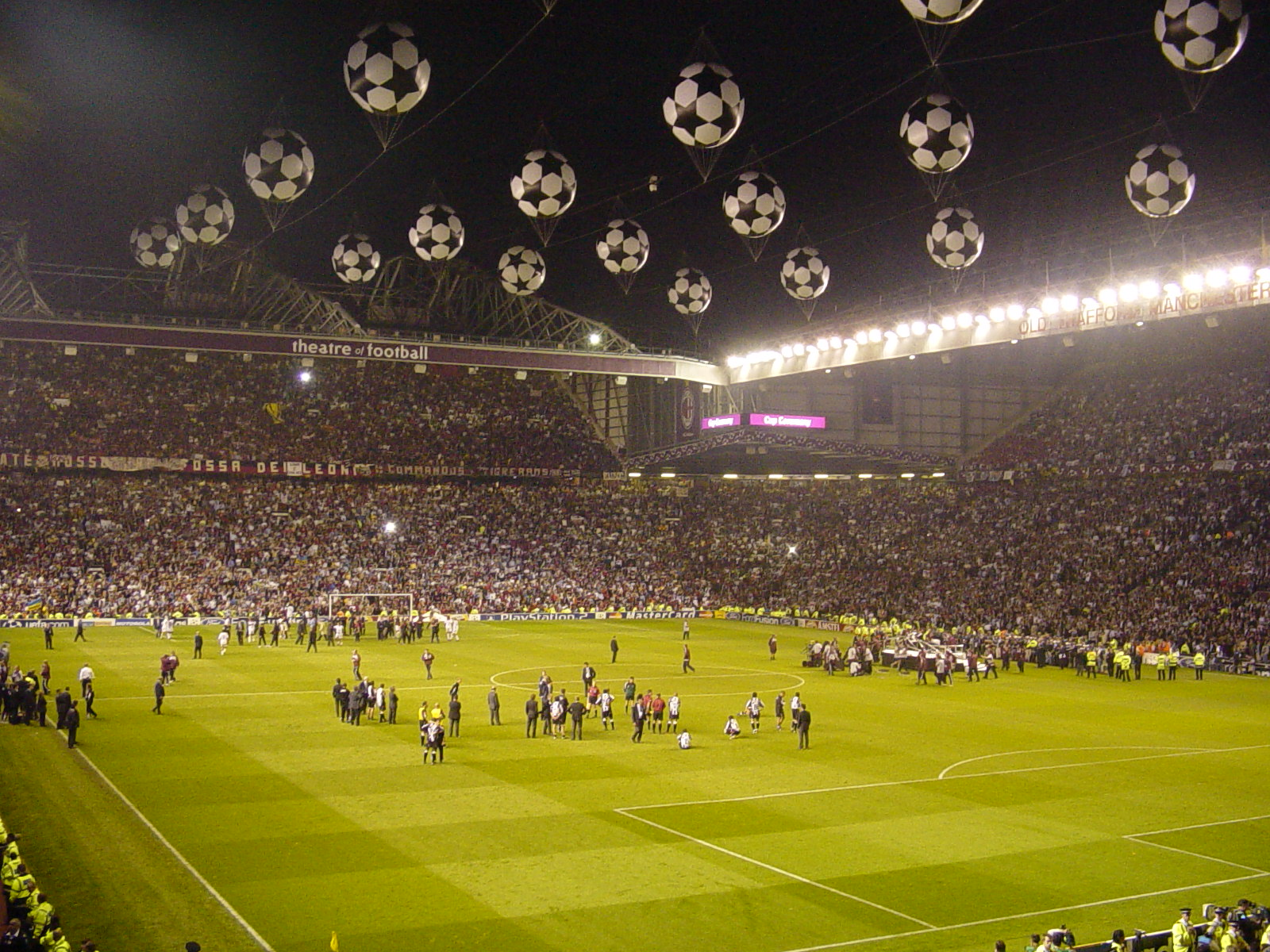
Old Trafford after the conclusion of the 2003 UEFA Champions League Final

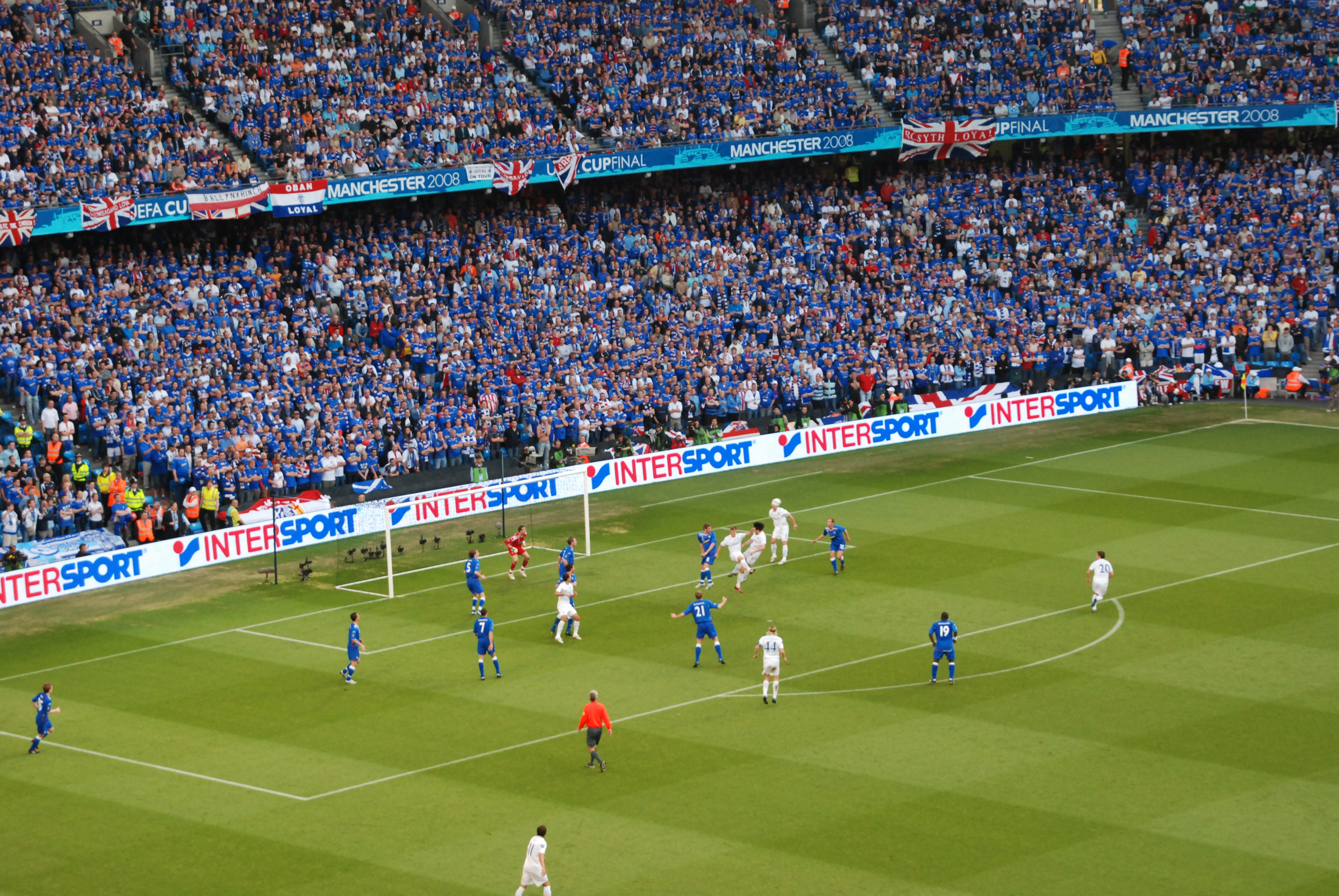
City of Manchester Stadium hosting the 2008 UEFA Cup Final

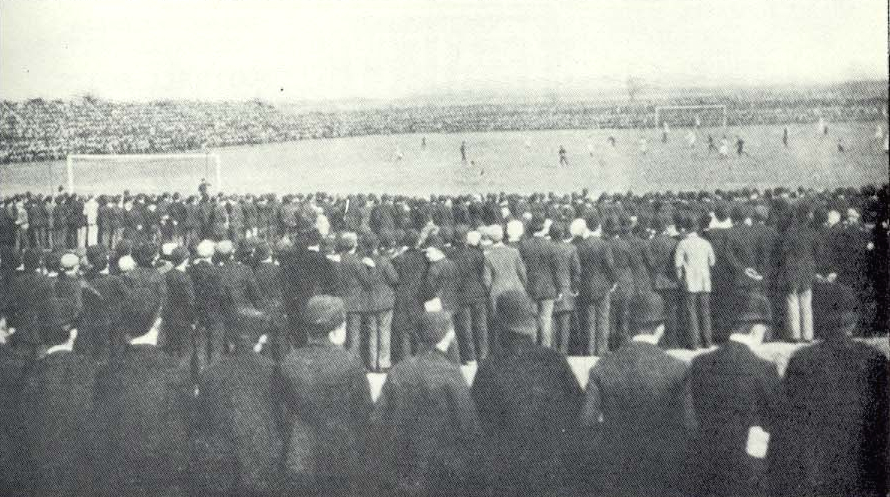
The 1893 FA Cup Final at Fallowfield Stadium, Manchester

Below is a list of international sporting events that have been held in Manchester at various venues

=== Football ===
International

- England national football team home stadium – 24 matches
  - Old Trafford – 18 (1926–2023)
  - Maine Road – 2 (1946–1949)
  - City of Manchester Stadium – 3 (2004–2016)
  - Manchester Football Ground, Whalley Range – 1 (1885)
- 1966 FIFA World Cup – Old Trafford
- UEFA Euro 1996 – Old Trafford
- UEFA Women's Euro 2005 – City of Manchester Stadium
- 2012 Olympic football – Old Trafford

UEFA Club Finals

- 2003 UEFA Champions League Final – Old Trafford
- 2008 UEFA Cup Final – City of Manchester Stadium

Domestic Club Finals

- FA Cup Finals – 4 matches
  - 1893 – Fallowfield Stadium
  - 1911 replay – Old Trafford
  - 1915 – Old Trafford
  - 1970 replay – Old Trafford
- Football League Cup finals – 3 matches
  - 1977 second replay – Old Trafford
  - 1978 replay – Old Trafford
  - 1984 replay – Maine Road
- FA Cup semi-final venue – 46 semi-final matches
  - Old Trafford – 23
  - Maine Road – 18
  - Fallowfield Stadium – 2
  - Whalley Range - 2
  - Hyde Road – 1
- FA Charity/Community Shield – 11
  - Old Trafford – 6
  - Maine Road – 5

=== Cricket ===
International

- Cricket World Cup host city - 3
  - Old Trafford Cricket Ground - 1975, 1979, 1983
    (including two semi-finals in 1979 and 1983)
- The Ashes host venue
  - Old Trafford Cricket Ground: since 1882 (with the exception of the 2009 which was played in Cardiff, however Ashes cricket returned to Old Trafford in 2013)

=== Roller Derby ===
- 2018 Roller Derby World Cup - Event City

=== Rugby League ===
International

- Rugby League World Cup
  - 1960 - Central Park
  - 1970 - Central Park
  - 1995 - Old Trafford, Central Park
  - 2000 - Old Trafford, University of Bolton Stadium
  - 2013 - Old Trafford, DW Stadium, AJ Bell Stadium, Leigh Sports Village
  - 2021 - Old Trafford, DW Stadium, University of Bolton Stadium, Leigh Sports Village
- Women's Rugby League World Cup
  - 2000 - Rugby Ground
  - 2021 - Old Trafford, DW Stadium
- Wheelchair Rugby League World Cup
  - 2021 - Manchester Central

Domestic

- Super League Grand Final venue - Old Trafford

=== Rugby Union ===
International

- Rugby World Cup host city
  - 2015: City of Manchester Stadium
- Women's Rugby World Cup host city
  - 2025: Salford Community Stadium

=== Snooker ===
- Snooker World Championship - 5
  - Houldsworth Hall - 2 (1952, 1954)
  - City Exhibition Hall - 1 (1973)
  - Belle Vue - 1 (1974)
  - Wythenshawe Forum - 1 (1976)

== See also ==
- Sport in England
- Sport in the United Kingdom
