= Regional casino =

In the United Kingdom, a regional casino (super casino or mega casino) was the largest category of casino permitted under law – equivalent in size to the larger casinos in Las Vegas. The first regional casino was proposed in 2007 for Manchester, but the scheme was scrapped by the government in 2008.

== History ==
The Gambling Act 2005 revised many regulations relating to gambling in Great Britain. Among the more controversial provisions was the establishment of a number of 'destination casinos' in the style of Las Vegas, referred to in the media as 'super casinos'.

Initial drafts of the act proposed eight regional casinos, but concerns expressed in the national media and by a range of addiction-related social and religious groups meant that the final revision of the act permitted only one casino of the largest size, referred to as a 'regional casino', with a further eight 'large' and eight 'small' casinos of a smaller sizes and with reduced jackpot limits.

Prior to the act, there were 140 casinos in the UK, the largest of which in Star City, Birmingham had a floor area of around 950 square metres (10,200 sq ft). Customers were required to register twenty-four hours prior to gaming.

== Definition of casino types ==
Under the terms of the Gambling Act, the Secretary of State is able to define each type of casino, with reference to any matter he or she chooses; although the act specifically mentions as facts to consider the number, location and concentration of gaming tables, and the floor area designated for a specific purpose.

Definitions were determined such that the 'super casino' would have a minimum customer area of 5000 square metres and at most 1250 unlimited-jackpot slot machines.

'Large casinos' would have a minimum area of 1000 square metres and up to 150 slot machines with a maximum jackpot of £4000.

The 'small casinos' would have a minimum customer area of 750 sq metres, up to 80 slot machines and a jackpot of £4000.

== Shortlist and selection ==
In May 2006, a short-list of eight sites, selected from submissions by local councils, was announced for the regional casino. These were:

- Wembley Stadium, Brent, London (which removed itself from consideration prior to the decision being made)
- The O_{2}, Greenwich, London
- Cardiff
- Blackpool
- Sportcity, Manchester
- Newcastle
- Bramall Lane, East End (Don Valley Stadium) or Meadowhall Centre, Sheffield
- Glasgow: many sites were put forward, including Ibrox Park

Wembley was later ruled out: "The decision came after the local council withdrew its support for the proposed £335m ($632m) gambling venue".This brought the number of potential venues down to seven. The O_{2}'s proposal was involved in controversy after it was revealed that Deputy Prime Minister John Prescott had stayed at the ranch of Philip Anschutz, whose Anschutz Entertainment Group was involved in the reopening of the Millennium Dome site as a sporting and entertainment venue. In August 2006 it was reported that construction of the shell of The O_{2}'s super casino site had already started.

Sites rejected at this shortlisting phase included:

- Chesterfield
- Coventry
- Dartford
- Dudley
- Great Yarmouth
- Havering
- Kingston-upon-Hull
- Ipswich
- Leeds
- Middlesbrough
- Midlothian
- Newport
- Solihull (National Exhibition Centre)
- Southampton
- Southend-on-Sea
- Sunderland
- Thurrock
- Wakefield
- West Dunbartonshire

On 30 January 2007, it was announced that the first regional casino would be built in east Manchester near the City of Manchester Stadium. This was regarded as a shock to the Blackpool and The O_{2} (formerly the Millennium Dome) bids, both of whom were regarded as the favourites. However, the Blackpool bid organisers pledged to continue the work in getting government approval for a 'supercasino'.

The Casino Advisory Panel also recommend the areas in which large casinos should be licensed: Great Yarmouth; Kingston-upon-Hull; Leeds; Middlesbrough; Milton Keynes; Newham; Solihull and Southampton.

== Outcome ==
In March 2007, the House of Lords rejected the Gambling Order relating to the Manchester casino. In January 2008, under new Prime Minister Gordon Brown, the government confirmed that plans for super casinos would be scrapped.

By November 2015, casinos in the 'large' category had opened in Milton Keynes, Newham and Solihull, with a fourth due to open in Leeds in 2016.

== See also ==
- Gambling in the UK
