= Sportcity =

Sports and leisure facility in Manchester, England

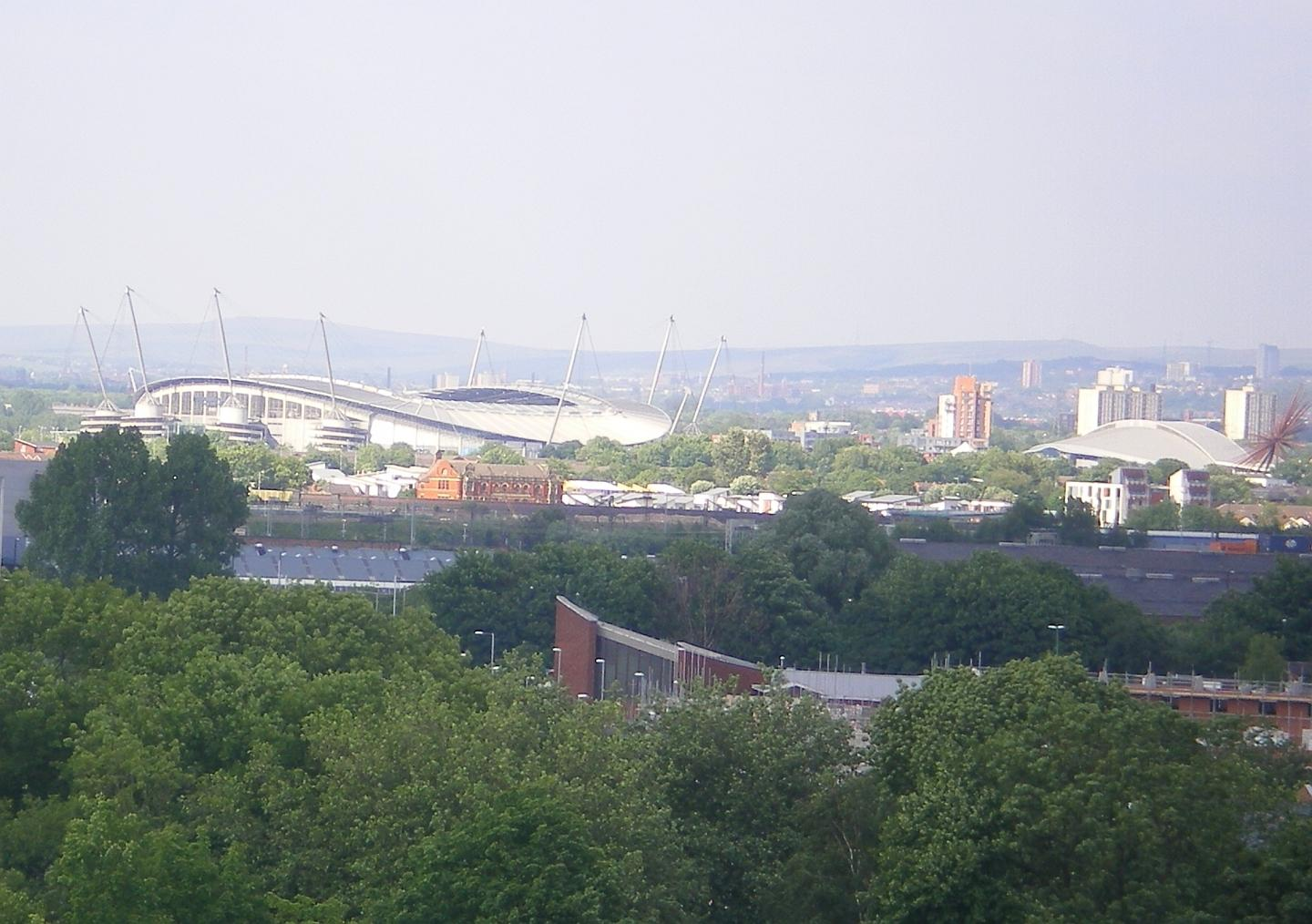
- Interactive map of Sportcity
- Location: Beswick and Clayton, Greater Manchester
- Coordinates: 53°28′48″N 02°11′21″W
- Owner: Manchester Council; Manchester City F.C.
- Type: Sports, community, leisure

Construction
- Built: 1999-2002
- Opened: 2002

Sportcity is a multipurpose sports and leisure facility located in Beswick and Clayton in Greater Manchester, England, two miles east from Manchester city centre. Originally built to host the 2002 Commonwealth Games, it was developed on former industrial land including the site of Bradford Colliery.

Sportcity's largest structure, the City of Manchester Stadium, is home to Manchester City F.C. and is one of the largest football stadiums in England. Sportcity is also home to the National Squash Centre, Rugby Football League headquarters, Manchester Regional Arena for athletics and British Cycling, who operate from Manchester Velodrome and the National Indoor BMX Arena.

== Location and venues ==
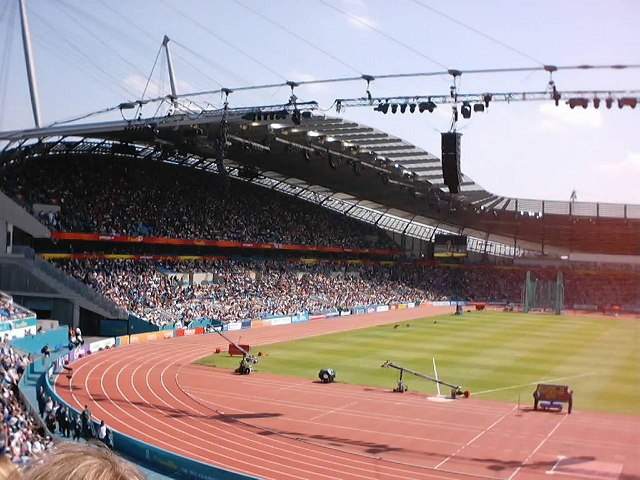
City of Manchester Stadium in its athletics configuration for the 2002 Commonwealth Games

The Sportcity complex is in Beswick and Bradford in east Manchester. A visitor centre provides information on the site's history from a heavily industrialised area to its ongoing regeneration. The Etihad Campus tram stop on the Manchester Metrolink close to Joe Mercer Way became operational on 11 February 2013.

Sportcity was the proposed location for the U.K.'s first SuperCasino, but the plan was rejected by the House of Lords. It was also the proposed site of an 85-metre (279 ft) wind turbine in 2006. Designed by Norman Foster, the turbine was intended to provide power for the stadium and nearby homes, but safety concerns about ice on the blades led to the proposal being abandoned.

=== City of Manchester Stadium ===
The City of Manchester Stadium was used for the 2002 Commonwealth Games and is the home of Manchester City Football Club. The stadium with twelve 70-metre high masts and a capacity of just over 55,000 has become a landmark on the Manchester skyline. The stadium is leased to the football club. The stadium lease was renegotiated in October 2010 and Manchester City will pay Manchester City Council £3 million a year rather than paying half the revenue over 35,000 ticket sales which amounted to approximately £2 million. The club plans to increase the stadium's capacity to 60,000 by adding a third tier to the north and south stands.

=== Etihad Campus ===
The Etihad Campus is located south east of the main stadium and is the main training base for Manchester City. It is made up of the Academy Stadium which plays host to Manchester City W.F.C. and Manchester City F.C. EDS and Academy as well as community spaces such as a leisure centre and Sixth Form college.

=== National Cycling Centre ===
The National Cycling Centre is a multipurpose cycling venue including the Manchester Velodrome, National Indoor BMX Arena, and mountain bike trials.

==== Manchester Velodrome ====
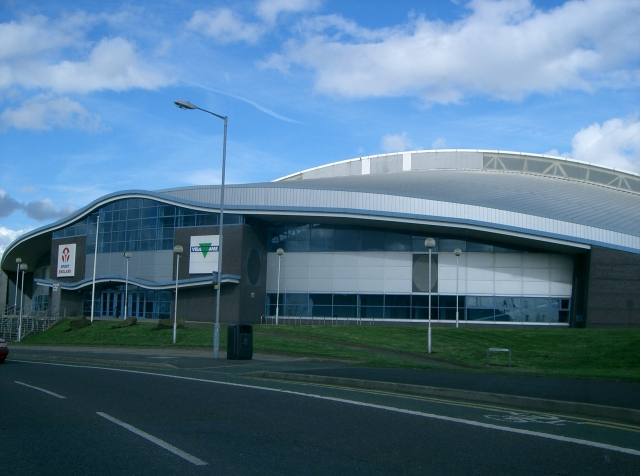
Manchester Velodrome

Manchester Velodrome was built for Manchester Olympic bids in the 1990s and used for the 2002 Commonwealth Games. The velodrome had a lasting legacy and in the Beijing Olympics in 2008, the British cycling team—based at the velodrome—dominated the cycling events. The track has garnered a reputation for speed and by 30 March 2008, more than 15 world records had been set there, including Chris Boardman's 1996 and 2000 hour records and the 4000 metre team pursuit record set by the Great Britain men's team at the 2008 World Championships.

==== National BMX Arena ====
British Cycling and Manchester City Council, in partnership with New East Manchester worked together to deliver the 110,000-square-foot (10,000 m^{2}) National Indoor BMX Centre which opened in 2011. It was designed by Ellis Williams Architects, and built by contractors Sir Robert McAlpine. Alongside the velodrome, the £24 million complex will form the National Cycling Centre. It has 2,000 seats, a BMX area and offices for the headquarters of the British Cycling Federation.

=== Manchester Regional Arena ===
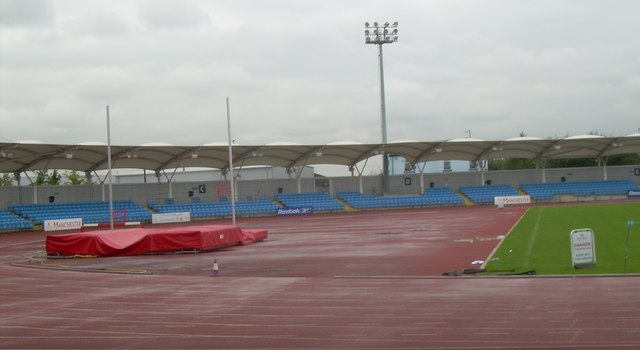
Manchester Regional Arena

Manchester Regional Arena is a multipurpose stadium at SportCity primarily used for athletics and football. It was developed as the warm-up track for the 2002 Commonwealth Games held in the adjacent City of Manchester Stadium. It has hosted the AAA Championships and Paralympic World Cup, and was the reserve home ground of Manchester City reserves before the team moved to Ewen Fields in June 2010.

=== The National Squash Centre ===
The National Squash Centre is another part of the Sportcity complex which was constructed for the 2002 Commonwealth Games. Costing approximately £3.5m, the facilities include six courts and a glass-walled show court which cost £110,000. The show court is moveable: it floats in the air like a hovercraft and can be positioned in the athletics hall for major tournaments. All the courts can be converted into singles or doubles courts at the touch of a button.

=== Rugby Football League ===
In August 2022, the Rugby Football League completed its move to Sportcity having previously based at Red Hall in North Leeds.

=== Co-op Live ===
Construction on a 23,500-capacity multi-purpose indoor arena began in 2021, in a joint venture between City Football Group and Oak View Group. The venue, named Co-op Live to reflect significant investment in it by the Co-operative Group, opened on 14 May 2024 with a concert by Manchester indie rock band Elbow, after a series of delays. It is the biggest indoor arena in Europe by capacity, surpassing the nearby AO Arena.

== Future development ==
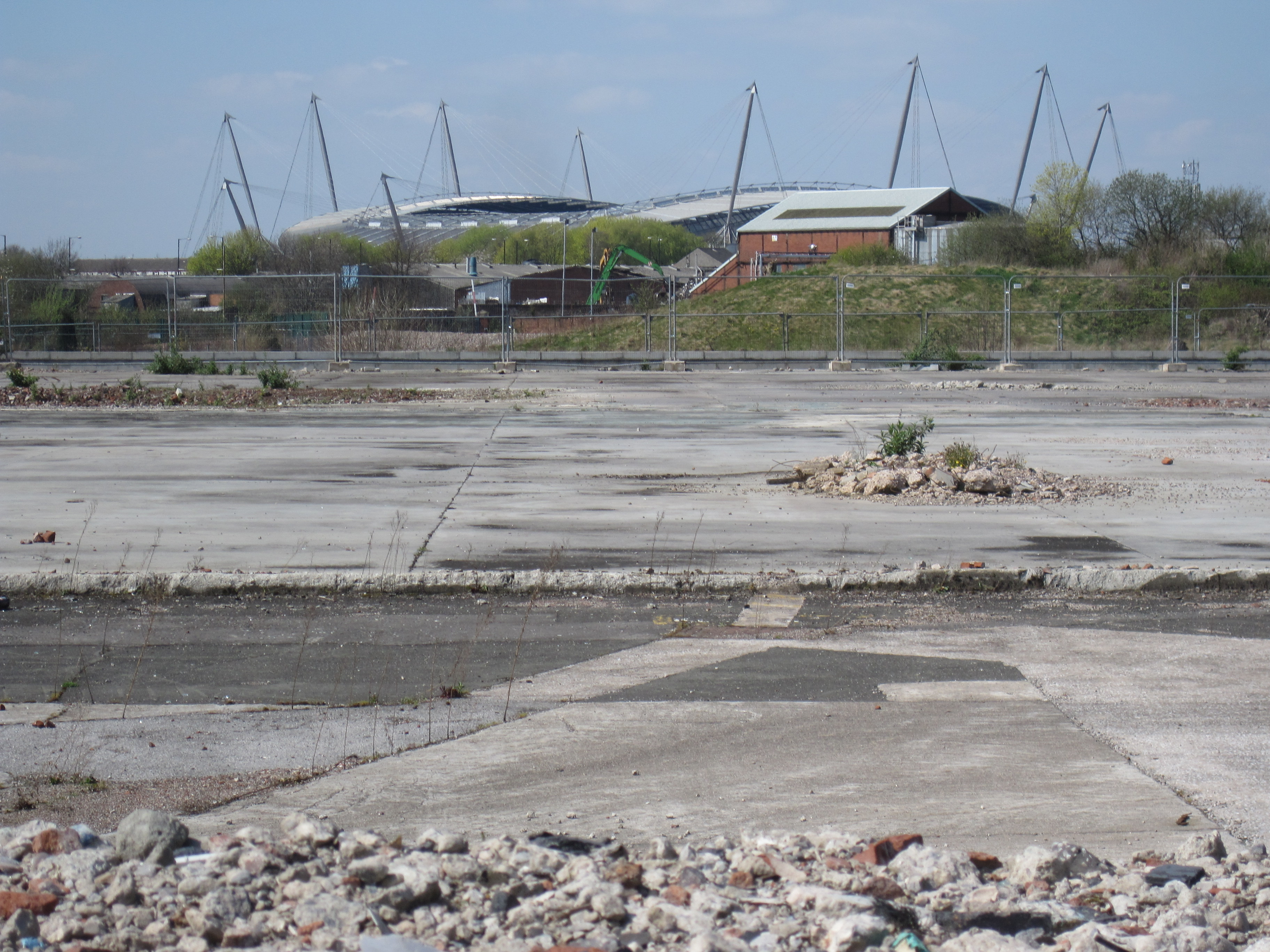
Derelict land in Openshaw West, Manchester City F.C. and Manchester City Council own 200 acres of land around East Manchester

In March 2010, Manchester City signed an agreement with Manchester City Council and the New East Manchester Agency to explore alternative leisure proposals to replace the regional casino giving the club permission to expand its facilities.

Jack Rouse Associates, the company that owns Ferrari World in Abu Dhabi emerged as a possible developer. A mixed-use development was listed on its website in October 2010.

== See also ==
- Sport in Manchester
