= 2013 UCI BMX Supercross World Cup =

The 2013 UCI BMX Supercross World Cup is a multi–race tournament over a season of BMX racing organised by the Union Cycliste Internationale. The season runs from 19 April to 28 September 2013. In this edition the World Cup consists of four rounds in Manchester, Santiago del Estero, Papendal and Chula Vista.

== Manchester, England ==
The first round took place in Manchester at the National Indoor BMX Arena. As usual the competition consisted of a time-trail on the first day followed by heats and finals on the second day. Shanaze Reade and Liam Phillips of Great Britain won the time-trial prizes and went on to win the finals.

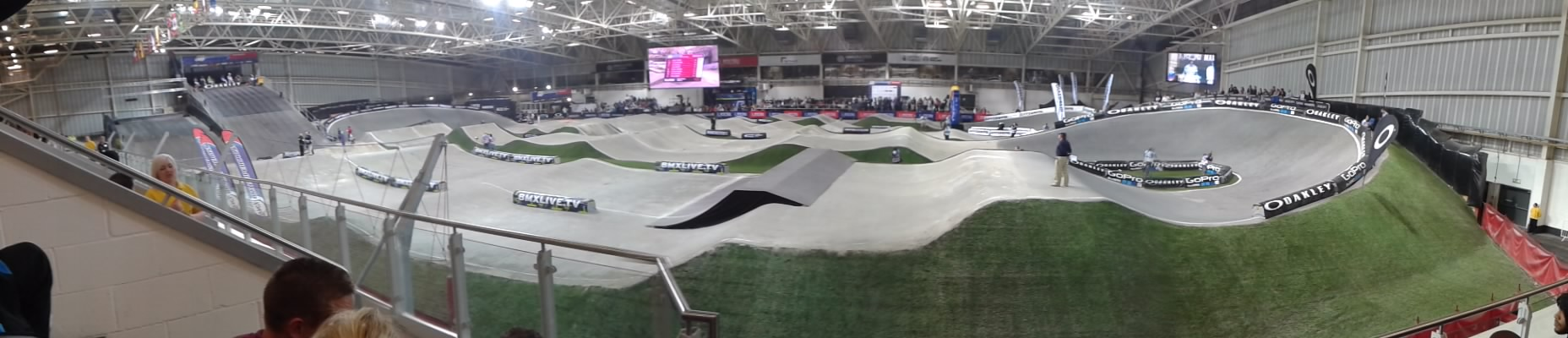
National Indoor BMX Arena at the 2013 UCI BMX Supercross World Cup

== See also ==
- 2011 UCI BMX Supercross World Cup
