= National Cycling Centre =

Cycling venue and offices in Manchester, United Kingdom

- Logo of the Cycling Centre
- Full name: National Cycling Centre
- Former names: HSBC UK National Cycling Centre; Manchester Velodrome
- Address: Manchester; United Kingdom
- Location: Stuart Street; Manchester; England; M11 4DQ
- Coordinates: 53°29′07″N 2°11′27″W
- Owner: City of Manchester
- Operator: Greenwich Leisure Limited (GLL)
- Capacity: 3500
- Surface: Siberian Pine
- Field size: 250 metres

Construction
- Opened: September 1994 (velodrome)
- Expanded: 2011 (BMX complex); 2013 (Mountain bike trails)
- Architect: Faulkner Brown Architects
- Services engineer: R.V. Webb

Tenant
- British Cycling

Website
- http://www.nationalcyclingcentre.com

The National Cycling Centre is a multipurpose cycling venue in Sportcity, Manchester, United Kingdom. It includes an indoor Velodrome and a BMX arena and outdoor mountain bike trials. It also has offices for British Cycling, the governing body for cycling in Britain.

== Venues ==
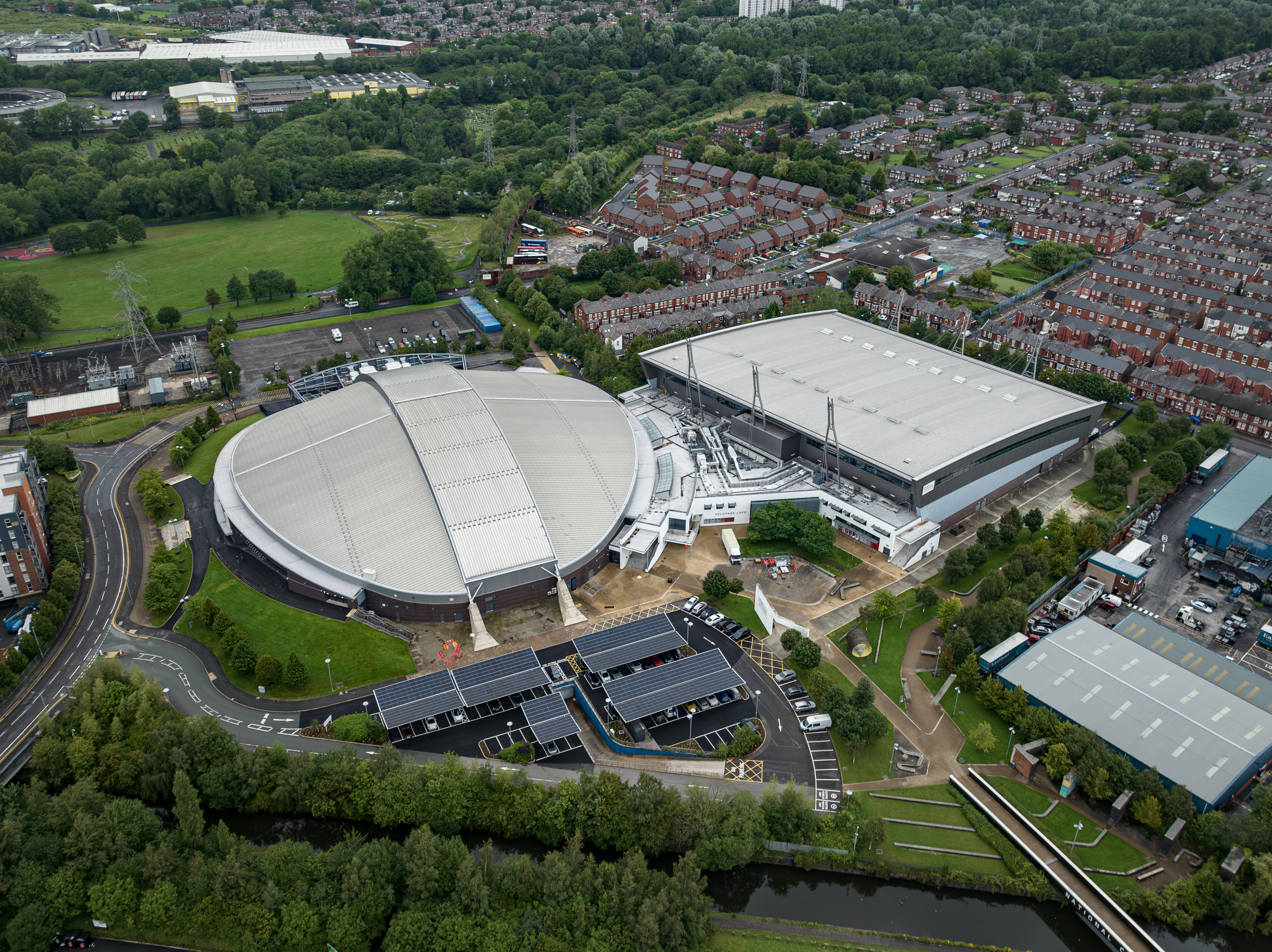
Aerial view of the National Cycling Centre

=== Velodrome ===
The velodrome of the National Cycling Centre was built in 1994 for Manchester Olympic bids. It was Britain's first indoor cycling track. It hosted track cycling events in the 2002 Commonwealth Games, the Revolution series and the UCI Track Cycling World Championships a record three times (1996, 2000 and 2008). More than 15 track cycling world records have been set on the track. The velodrome has been cited as a catalyst for Britain's successes in track cycling since 2002 and nowadays claims to be one of the busiest in the world.

==== Sports Court ====
The centre of the velodrome has a 40m x 38m sprung wooden floor with courts marked out for 10 x Badminton, 2 x Basketball, 2 x Futsal, and 2 x Korfball.

=== BMX complex ===
British Cycling and Manchester City Council, in partnership with New East Manchester worked together to deliver the 110,000-square-foot (10,000 m^{2}) National Indoor BMX Centre which opened in 2011. It was designed by Ellis Williams Architects, and built by contractors Sir Robert McAlpine. The £24 million complex is the only permanent indoor BMX track in the United Kingdom. It has 2,000 seats, a BMX area and offices for the headquarters of British Cycling.

=== Mountain bike trials ===
There are mountain bike trails through Clayton Vale, a green space through the Medlock River Valley Corridor, since 2013. The trails are 12 km in length including four skill levels from easy to expert. The National Cycling Centre is the Trail head for this route.

There is also a Mountain Bike and BMX Skills Zone, featuring a pump track and technical trail features.
