= National Indoor BMX Arena =

BMX racing facility in Manchester, England

National Cycling Centre
- National Indoor BMX Arena
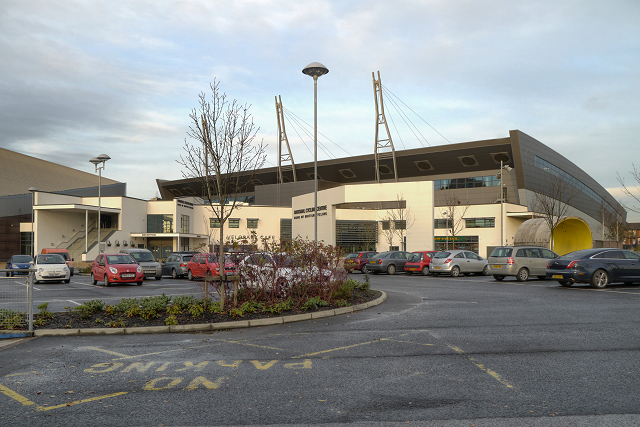
- Location: Bank Street; Manchester; England; M11 4BT
- Coordinates: 53°29′07″N 2°11′25″W
- Owner: City of Manchester
- Capacity: 2,000

Construction
- Built: 2010–2011
- Opened: 2011
- Cost: £24 million
- Architect: Ellis Williams Architects
- General contractor: Sir Robert McAlpine

Tenant
- Eastlands BMX Club

The National Indoor BMX Arena is an indoor BMX racing facility, located in Sportcity, Manchester, United Kingdom. The arena was designed by Ellis Williams Architects and built by contractors Sir Robert McAlpine. It is situated next to the Manchester Velodrome and the buildings share a common entrance as part of the National Cycling Centre. The arena cost £24 million to construct, seats 2,000 spectators and was opened in 2011. It is home to British Cycling’s BMX programme, which has produced world champions Shanaze Reade and Liam Phillips and Olympic champions Beth Shriever and Charlotte Worthington.

== Events ==
The arena hosted the first round of the 2013 UCI BMX Supercross World Cup.

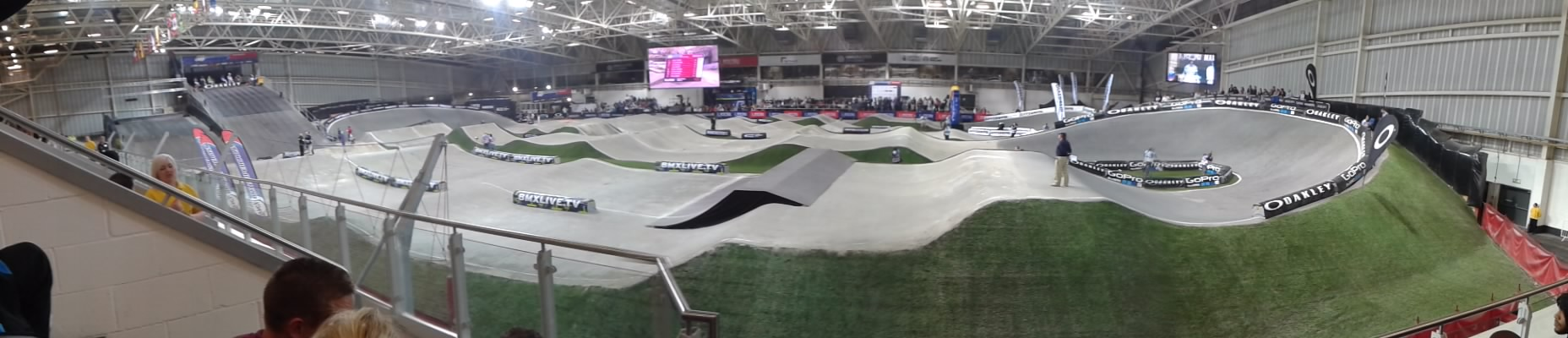
National Indoor BMX Arena during the 2013 UCI BMX Supercross World Cup
