= Manchester Velodrome =

Cycle-racing track in Manchester, England

National Cycling Centre
- Manchester Velodrome
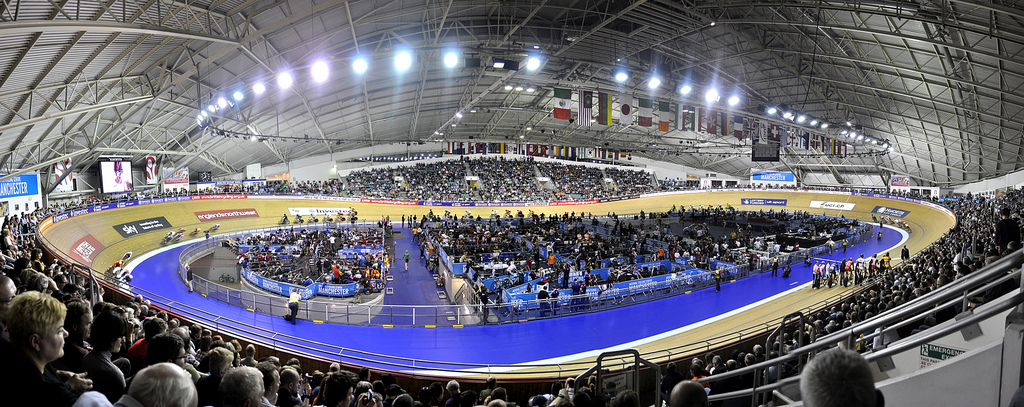
- Panorama image of the Manchester Velodrome
- Location: Stuart Street; Manchester; England; M11 4DQ
- Coordinates: 53.486°N 2.192°W
- Owner: City of Manchester
- Operator: Greenwich Leisure Limited (GLL)
- Capacity: 3,500
- Surface: Siberian Pine
- Field size: 250 metre track

Construction
- Opened: 14 September 1994
- Architect: FaulknerBrowns Architects
- Services engineer: R.V. Webb (Velodrome track)

Tenants
- British Cycling; Manchester Wheelers' Club; Major events hosted 2002 Commonwealth Games; UCI Track Cycling World Championships (1996, 2000, 2008); British National Track Championships; Revolution Cycling series

Website
- nationalcyclingcentre.com

Manchester Velodrome is an indoor Olympic-standard cycle-racing track in Manchester, England, which opened in 1994. Part of the National Cycling Centre, the facility has been home to British Cycling since 1994, coinciding with the nation's rise to track cycling dominance at World and Olympic level. The velodrome was also home to UCI WorldTeam Ineos Grenadiers, formerly known as Team Sky between 2010 and 2019, a period when the team won 6 Tour de France, 2 Vuelta a España and 1 Giro d'Italia with Great Britain riders.

The Manchester Velodrome has been cited as the major catalyst for Britain's successes in track and road cycling and has been described by Cycling Weekly as the "beating heart of British Cycling’s ascension to the top of world cycling".

For 18 years from opening, it was the only indoor Olympic-standard track in the United Kingdom before the completion of the Lee Valley VeloPark for the 2012 Summer Olympics. It is one of the busiest velodromes in the world used by both professional cyclists and members of the public from 8 am to 10 pm.

The venue hosted track cycling for the 2002 Commonwealth Games and forms part of the Sportcity complex, located adjacent to the City of Manchester Stadium, host stadium for the 2002 Games and home of Manchester City F.C. It has also hosted the UCI Track Cycling World Championships in 1996, 2000 and 2008, hosts regular meets of the Revolution track cycling series and now hosts Six-day racing. The National Indoor BMX Arena adjacent opened in 2011 and the Velodrome can be accessed from the Metrolink Velopark tram stop on the East Manchester Line.

== Velodrome ==
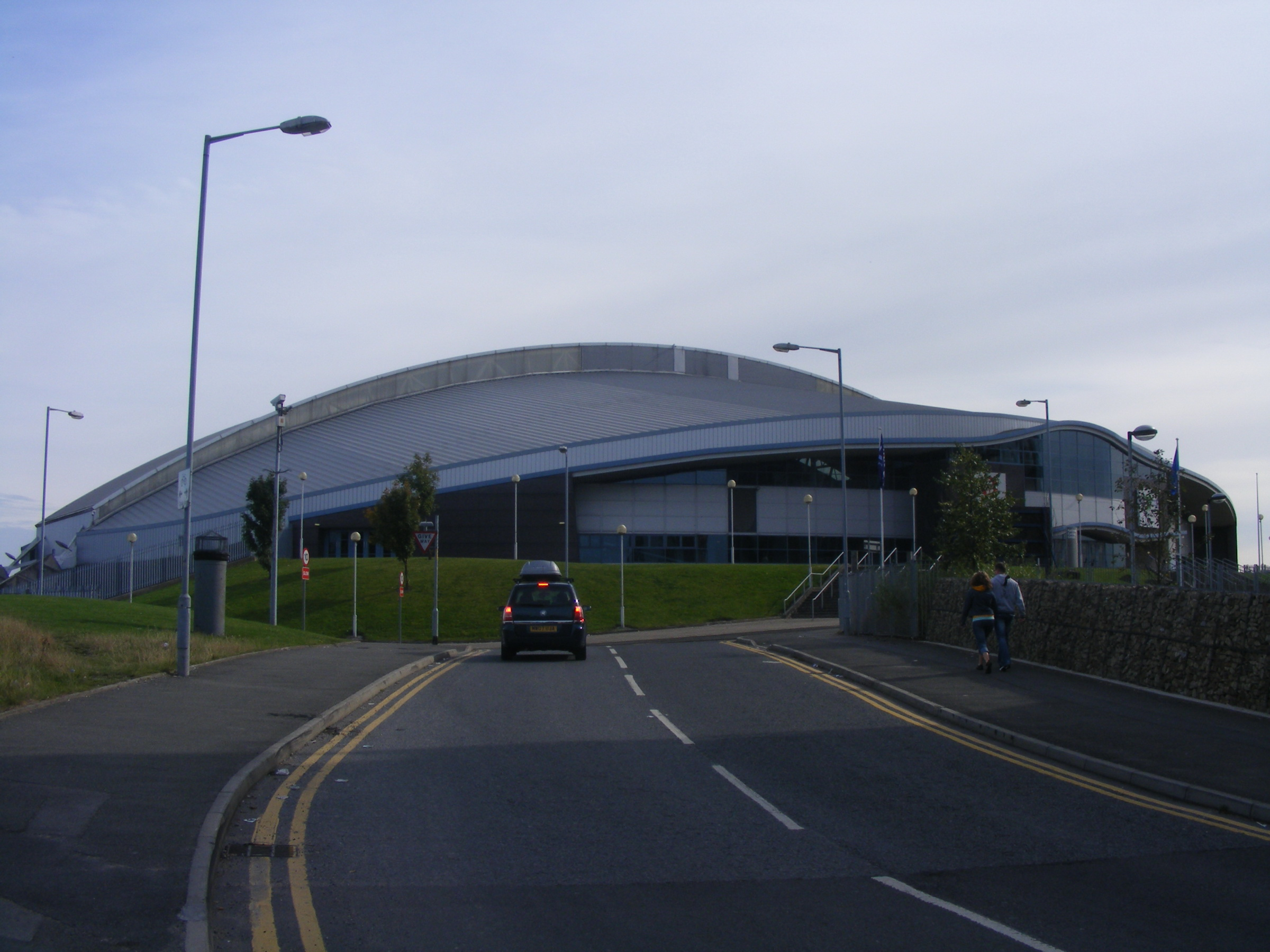
The exterior of the Manchester Velodrome from Stuart Street.

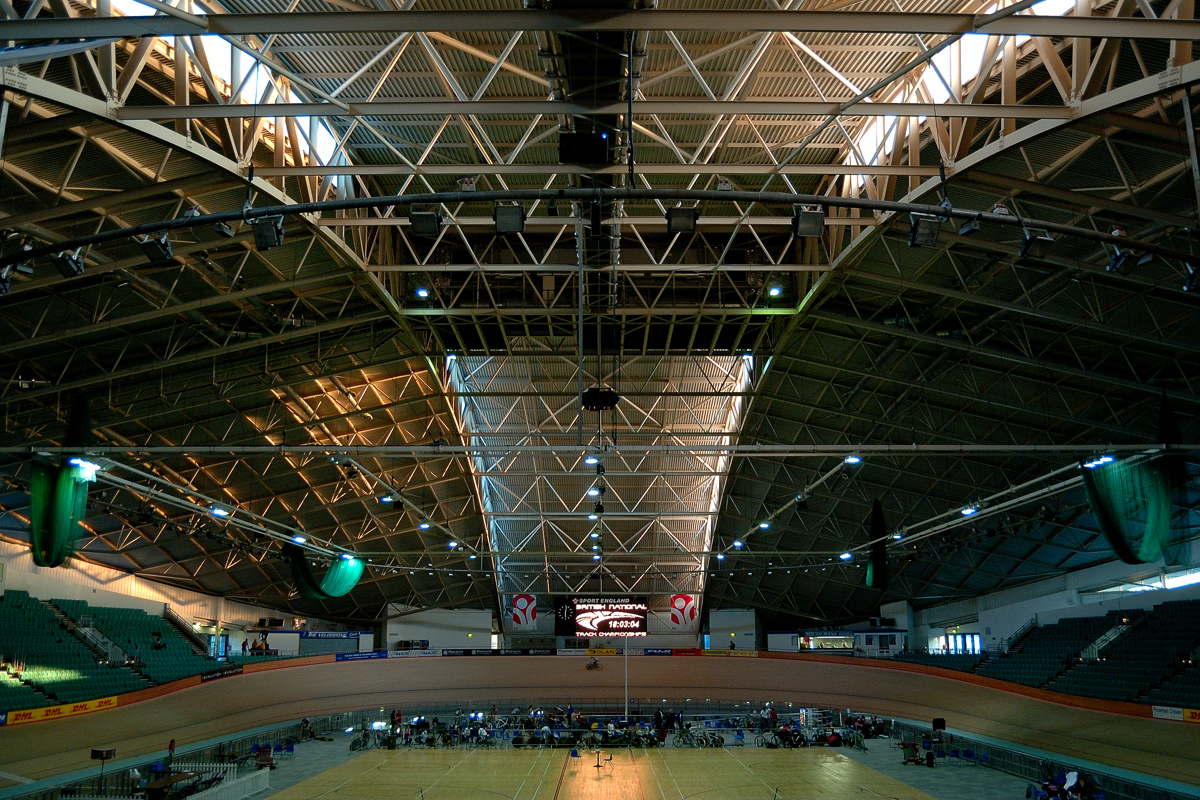
Internal view of the Velodrome.

The Manchester Velodrome was developed as a joint venture between Sport England, Manchester City Council and British Cycling, who recognised the need for an Olympic-standard facility in the United Kingdom to improve British track cycling. Funding was provided by the government, through the Department of the Environment (£6.5m), the Sports Council (£2m) and the Foundation for Sport and the Arts (£1m). Manchester City Council is the freehold owner and the centre is managed by the Eastlands Trust (formerly named the Velodrome Trust). The Velodrome was dismissed by some as a potential white elephant prior to opening – concerns that were later unfounded with the facility well used by the public and a key part of Britain's ascension to the top of track cycling.

The velodrome was designed by FaulknerBrowns Architects and has garnered a reputation for speed since its opening. The centre's roof structure is based around a 122-metre, 200 tonne arch allowing for an unrestricted viewing area for spectators. Covered by an aluminium roof, the total structure weighs around 600 tonnes. The track is 250 metres long and its bankings reach 42 degrees in the middle. The track is as steep at the top as it is on the black (racing) line. On 21 May 2007 the velodrome closed for resurfacing in Siberian pine at a cost of £400,000. It reopened on 16 July 2007, and is considered a smoother ride.

By 30 March 2008, more than 15 world records had been set, including Chris Boardman's 1996 and 2000 hour records and the 4000 metre team pursuit record set by the Great Britain men's team at the 2008 World Championships.

The UCI hour record set by Boardman in the Best Human Effort category in 1996, was rescinded by UCI in 2000 and subsequent attempts at breaking Eddy Merckx's 1972 record stopped as UCI believed advanced bicycle technology gave cyclists too much help. Boardman set out to break the record on a bike comparable to Eddy Merckx's 1972 machine. He surpassed the record at the velodrome in 2000, achieving a distance of 49.444km as against the 1972 record of 49.431 km, and then retired.

The velodrome has become a popular venue for cyclists with taster and practice sessions frequently booked up several weeks in advance. In 2011, the National Indoor BMX Arena was opened next to the velodrome. Plans proposed in 2012 included a mountain bike trail on Clayton Vale, which would be the first facility of its kind in the United Kingdom and would aim to replicate Britain's performance on the track in mountain biking.

== Events ==
=== Revolution ===
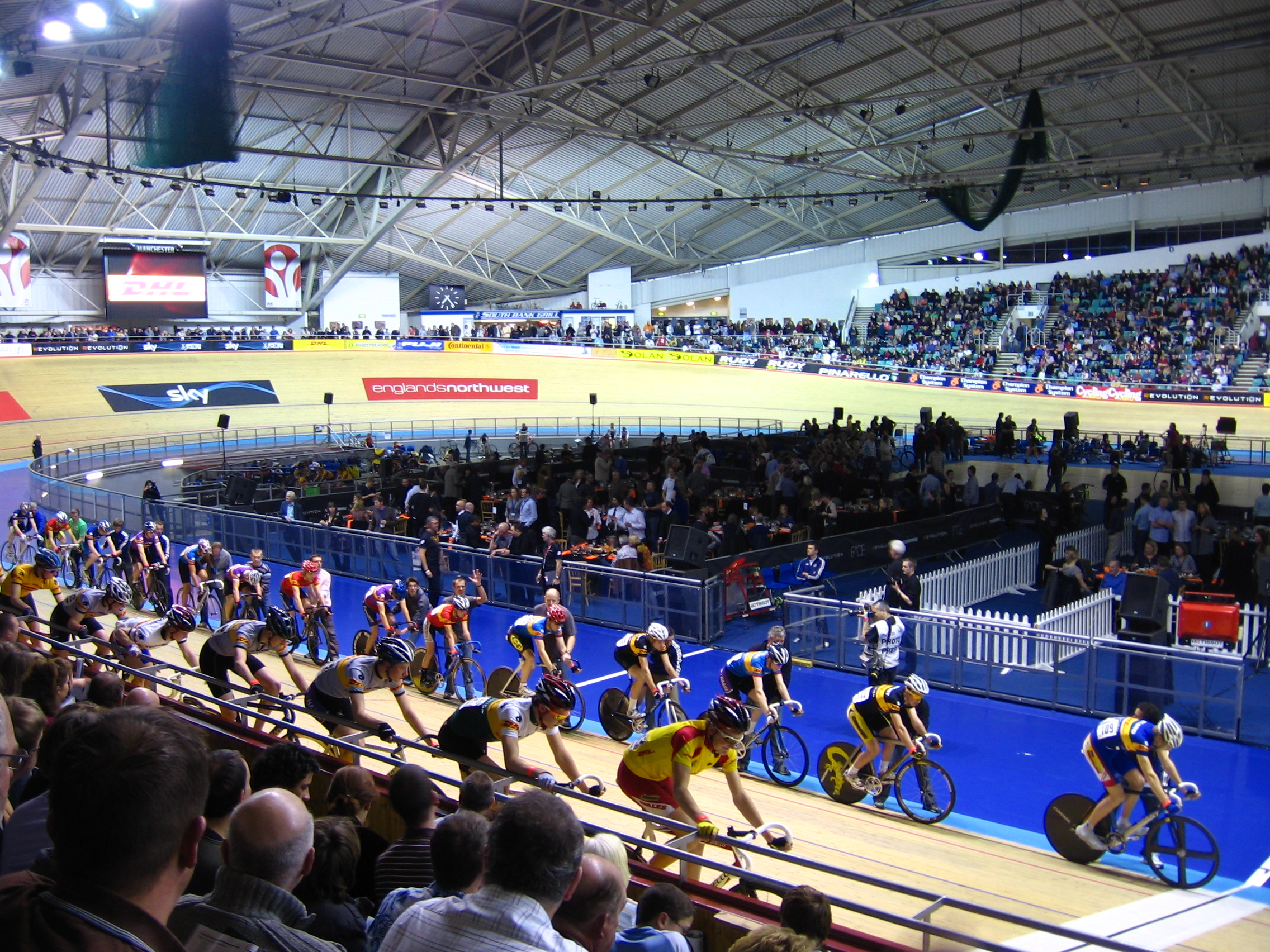
Revolution 22 at the Manchester Velodrome

The Revolution Series opened in 2003 to build on events such as the world championships and World Cup meetings and provide more regular events. There were four Revolution events over the winter of 2003–04. They built good crowds. The seventh, in 2005, sold all the seats with further fans standing. The first official sell-out was Revolution 14. The series of sprint and endurance events runs on Saturday nights. Internationals compete with British stars and up-and-coming talent. Some riders have retired at Revolution events, rewarded with a retirement presentation. A Future Stars competition has races for young riders aged 15 or 16 to test their sprint and endurance. Olympic riders Jason Kenny and Steven Burke came up through this series. In 2012 it was announced that Revolution events would take place at the recently opened London Velodrome and Glasgow Velodrome from 2013.

=== Other events ===
On 2 July 2009 Kraftwerk performed at the velodrome as part of the 2009 Manchester International Festival. As they performed Tour de France, four members of the British Olympic cycling team entered and rode laps of the track.

=== Notable events ===
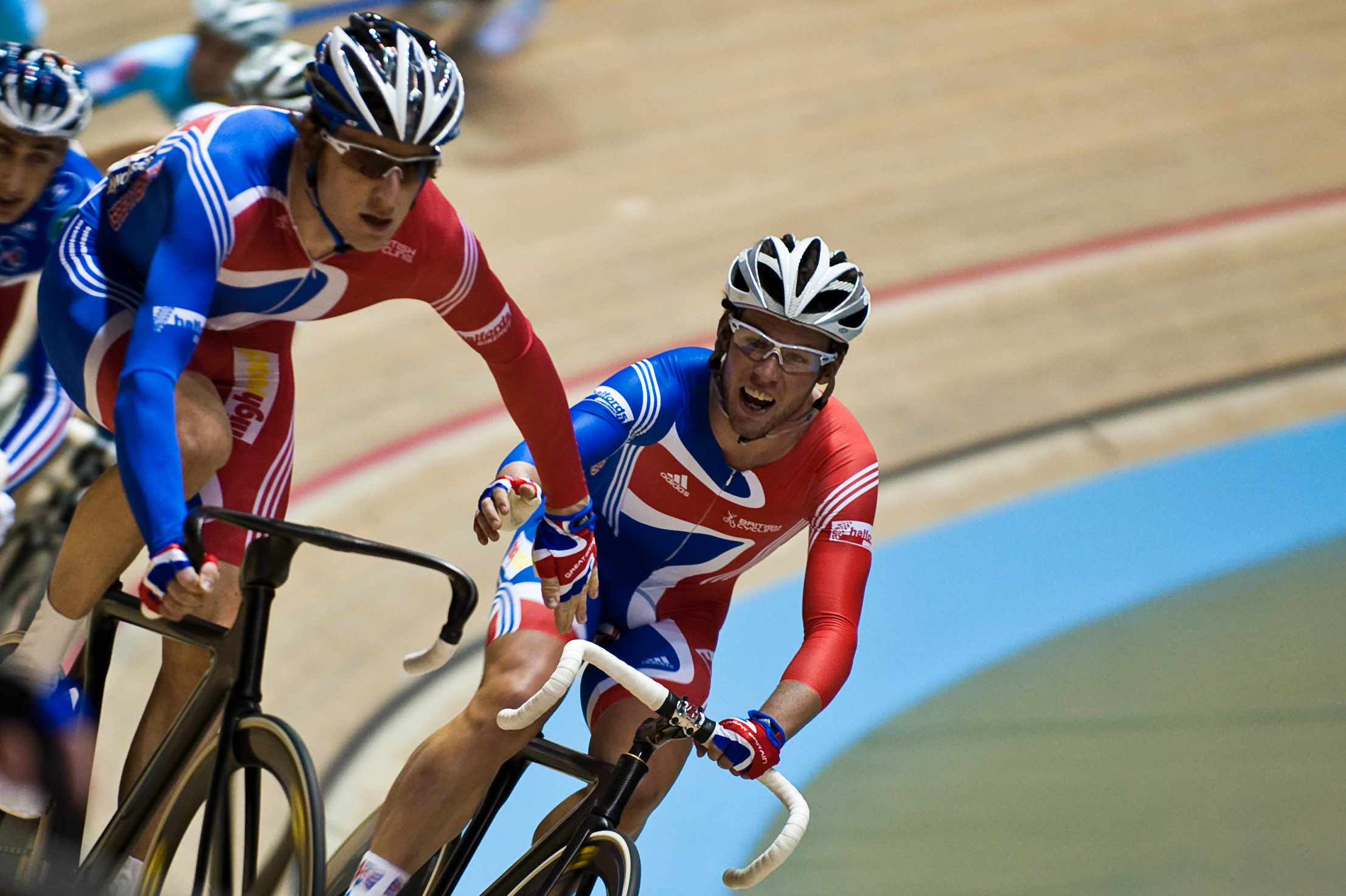
Bradley Wiggins and Mark Cavendish on their way to becoming the 2008 world Madison champions

A list of notable events which Manchester Velodrome has hosted:

- 1994 UCI Track Cycling Masters World Championships
- 1995 UCI Track Cycling Masters World Championships
- 1996 UCI Track Cycling Masters World Championships
- 1996 UCI Track Cycling World Championships
- 1997 UCI Track Cycling Masters World Championships
- 1998 UCI Track Cycling Masters World Championships
- 1999 UCI Track Cycling Masters World Championships
- 2000 UCI Track Cycling World Championships
- 2001 UCI Track Cycling Masters World Championships
- 2002 UCI Track Cycling Masters World Championships
- 2002 Commonwealth Games
- 2003 UCI Track Cycling Masters World Championships
- 2003–04 Revolution – Season 1
- 2004 UCI Track Cycling Masters World Championships
- 2004 UCI Track Cycling World Cup Classics (Round 3)
- 2004–05 UCI Track Cycling World Cup Classics (Round 3)
- 2004–05 Revolution – Season 2
- 2005–06 UCI Track Cycling World Cup Classics (Round 2)
- 2005 UCI Track Cycling Masters World Championships
- 2005–06 Revolution – Season 3
- 2006 UCI Track Cycling Masters World Championships
- 2006–07 Revolution – Season 4
- 2006–07 UCI Track Cycling World Cup Classics (Round 4)
- 2007 UCI Track Cycling Masters World Championships
- 2007–08 Revolution – Season 5
- 2008–09 Revolution – Season 6
- 2008–09 UCI Track Cycling World Cup Classics (Round 1)
- 2008 UCI Track Cycling World Championships
- 2009–10 Revolution – Season 7
- 2009–10 UCI Track Cycling World Cup Classics (Round 1)
- 2010–11 Revolution – Season 8
- 2010–11 UCI Track Cycling World Cup Classics (Round 4)
- 2011 UCI Track Cycling Masters World Championships
- 2011–12 Revolution – Season 9
- 2012 UCI Track Cycling Masters World Championships
- 2012–13 Revolution – Season 10 (Rounds 1, 2, and 3)
- 2013 UCI Track Cycling Masters World Championships
- 2013–14 Revolution – Season 11 (Rounds 1, 3, and 4)
- 2013–14 UCI Track Cycling World Cup (Round 1)
- 2014 UCI Track Cycling Masters World Championships
- 2015 UCI Track Cycling Masters World Championships
- 2019 British National Track Championships
- 2023 UCI Track Cycling Masters World Championships
- 2024 British Cycling National Track Championships

== See also ==
- List of Commonwealth Games venues
- List of cycling tracks and velodromes
- National Indoor BMX Arena

Preceded by Cheras Veledrome; Kuala Lumpur	2002 Commonwealth Games; Venue; 2002	Succeeded by Hisense Arena; Melbourne
Preceded by Velódromo Luis Carlos Galán; Bogotá	UCI Track Cycling World Championships; Venue; 1996	Succeeded by Perth SpeedDome; Perth
Preceded by Velodrom; Berlin	UCI Track Cycling World Championships; Venue; 2000	Succeeded by Sportpaleis; Antwerp
Preceded by Palma Arena; Palma de Mallorca	UCI Track Cycling World Championships; Venue; 2008	Succeeded by BGŻ Arena; Pruszków
