= British National Individual Time Trial Championships =

British cycling national competition

The British National Individual Time Trial Championships also known as the Kilo (for men) are held annually as part of the British National Track Championships organised by British Cycling. A women's championship was held for the first time in 1989.

== Men's 1 Km Senior Race ==
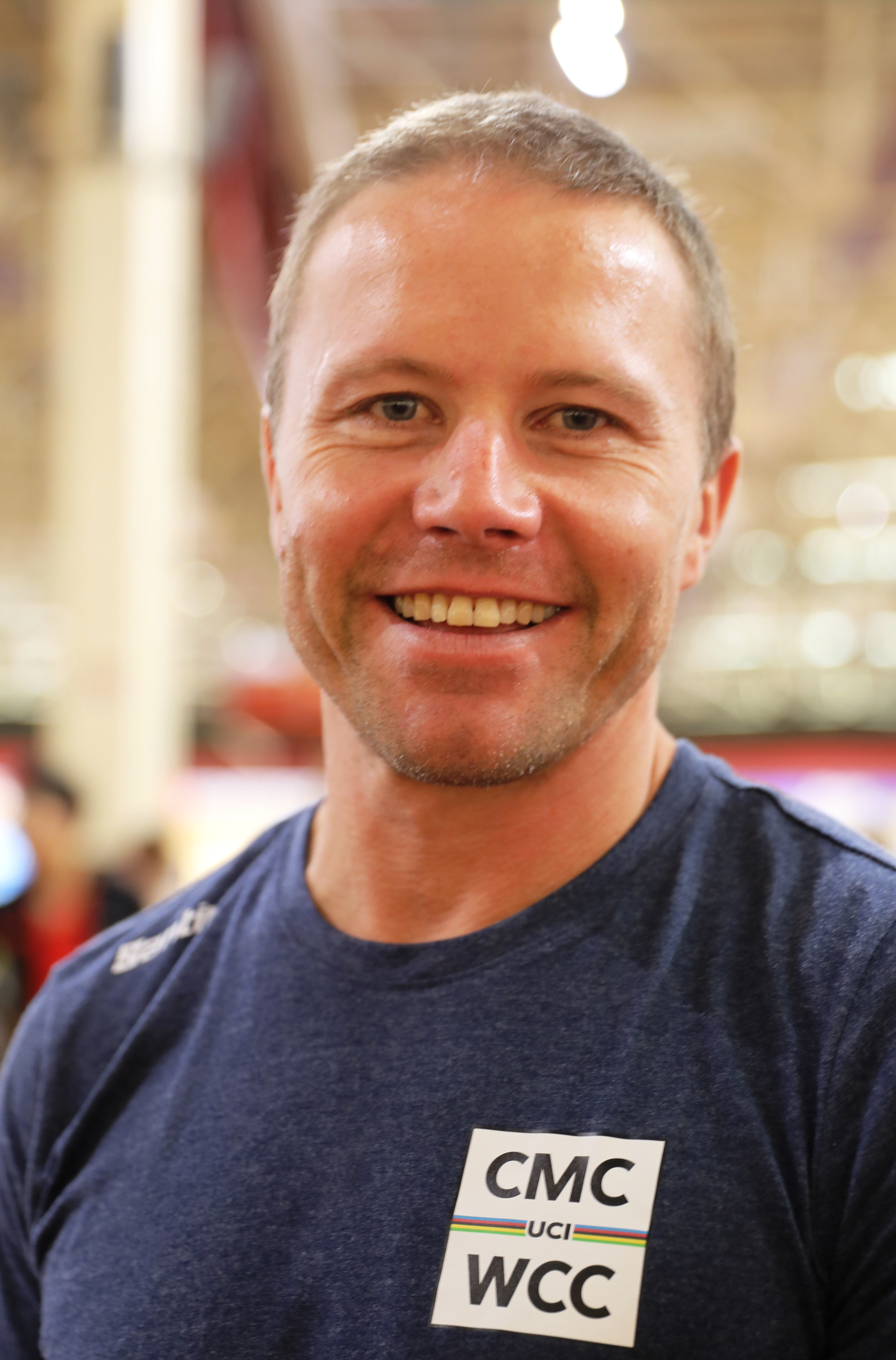
Craig McLean, five time winner

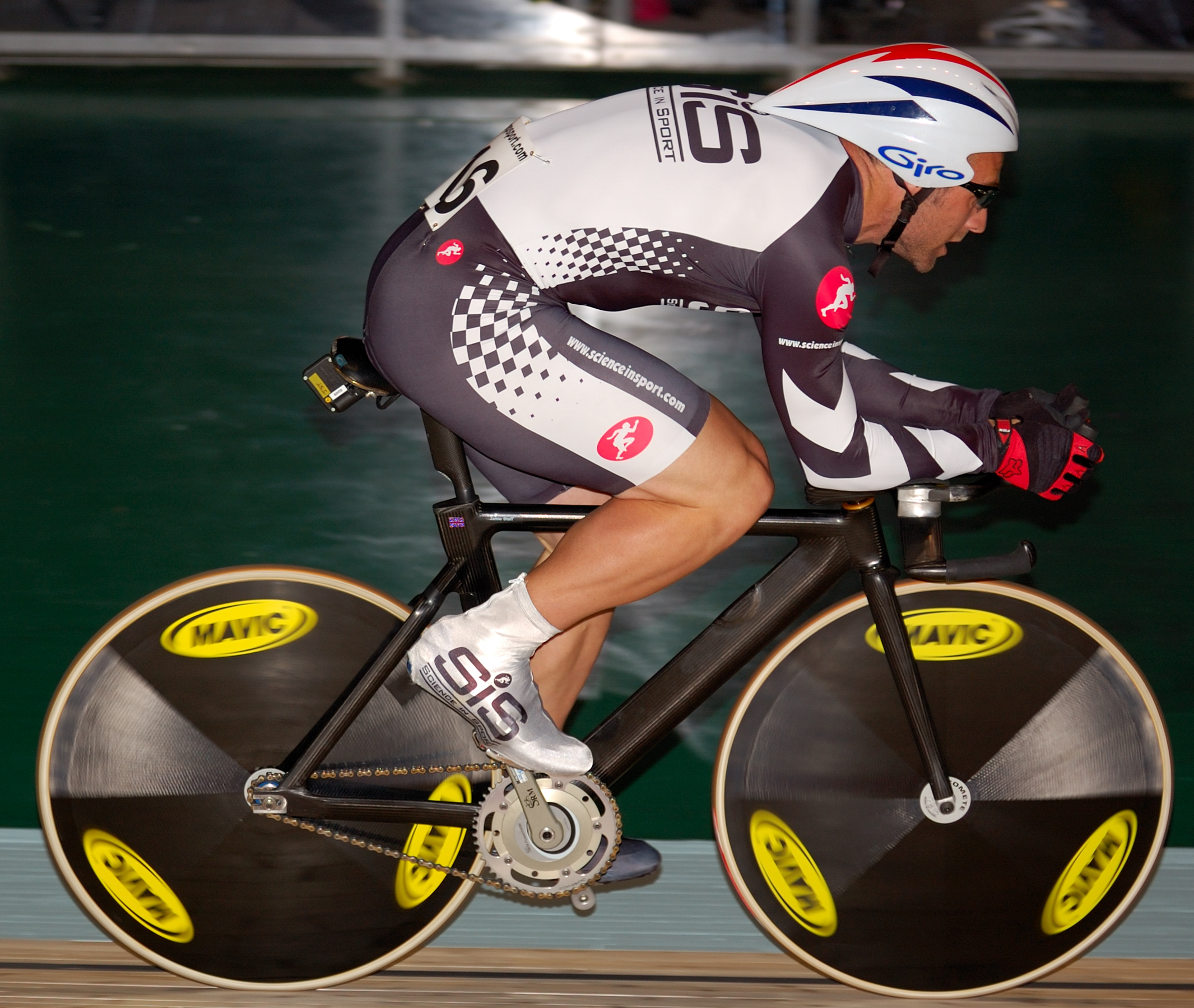
Jamie Staff winning in 2007

Year	Gold	Silver	Bronze	Ref
1966		Ian Alsop		
1967				
1968			=Ian Alsop = ?	
1969	Alf Engers			
1970	Ian Hallam			
1971	Mick Bennett & Tony Brockhurst			
1972	Mick Bennett	Dave Rowe	Steve Heffernan	
1973	Ian Hallam	Mick Bennett	Rik Evans	
1974	Ian Hallam	Mick Bennett	Willi Moore	
1975	Ian Hallam	Paul Medhurst	Trevor Gadd	
1976	Ian Hallam	Trevor Gadd	Andy Coady	
1977	Trevor Gadd	Paul Fennell	Andy Coady	
1978	Trevor Gadd	Steve Cronshaw	Paul Fennell	
1979	Paul Swinnerton	Terry Tinsley	Paul McGowan	
1980	Gary Sadler	Terry Tinsley	Russell Oliver	
1981	Terry Tinsley	Shaun Wallace	Brad Thurrell	
1982	Gary Sadler	Terry Tinsley	Mark Barry	
1983	Shaun Wallace	Mark Barry	Gary Sadler	
1984	Shaun Wallace	Mark Barry	Eddie Alexander	
1985	Eddie Alexander			
1986	Gary Coltman	Guy Rowland	R Bryant	
1987	Eddie Alexander	Colin Sturgess	Steve Paulding	
1988	Gary Neiwand (Aus)	Eddie Alexander	Paul McHugh	
1989 A	Steve Paulding	Stewart Brydon	Adrian Hawkins	
1989 P	Paul McHugh	Gary Coltman	Russell Williams	
1990	Steve Paulding	Adrian Hawkins	Eddie Alexander	
1991	Glen Sword	Anthony Stirrat	Steve Paulding	
1992	Anthony Stirrat	Steve Paulding	Stephen Whitcombe	
1993	Rob Hayles	Anthony Stirrat	Steve Paulding	
1994	Rob Hayles	Glen Sword	Richard Prince	
1995	Shaun Wallace	Rob Hayles	Anthony Stirrat	
1996	Shaun Wallace	Jason Queally	Craig MacLean	
1997	Craig MacLean	Jason Queally	Chris Hoy	
1998	Craig MacLean	Jason Queally	Chris Hoy	
1999	Craig MacLean	Chris Hoy	Neil Campbell	
2000	Jason Queally	Craig MacLean	Neil Campbell	
2001	Craig MacLean	Andy Slater	Jonathan Norfolk	
2002	Jonathan Norfolk	Anton Quist	Barney Storey	
2003	Craig MacLean	Jason Queally	Chris Hoy	
2004	Matthew Haynes	Barney Storey	Neil Potter	
2005	Chris Hoy	Jonathan Norfolk	Matthew Crampton	
2006	Chris Hoy	Rob Hayles	Jason Kenny	
2007	Jamie Staff	Ed Clancy	Jason Kenny	
2008	Matthew Crampton	Steven Burke	David Daniell	
2009	Steven Burke	Ed Clancy	David Daniell	
2010	Bruce Croall	Andrew Kelly	Ieuan Williams	
2011	Matt Rotherham	Steven Burke	Sam Harrison	
2012	Kian Emadi	Bruce Croall	Matt Rotherham	
2013	Kian Emadi	Ed Clancy	Matthew Crampton	
2014	Callum Skinner	Matthew Crampton	Matt Rotherham	
2015	Jason Kenny	Matthew Crampton	Steven Burke	
2017	Daniel Bigham	Thomas Rotherham	Jonathan Mitchell	
2018	Joseph Truman	Callum Skinner	Kian Emadi	
2019	Matt Rotherham	Bede Constantinides	Jonathan Wale	
2020	Jonathan Wale	Daniel Bigham	Kyle Gordon	
2021 not held due to COVID-19
2022	Matt Rotherham	Jonathan Wale	Harvey McNaughton	
2023	Joe Holt	Calum Moir	Tom Ward	
2024	Aaron Pope	Niall Monks	Henry Hobbs	
2025	not held			
2026	to be held in Glasgow, 25 Jan 2026			

== Women's 500 metres Senior Race ==
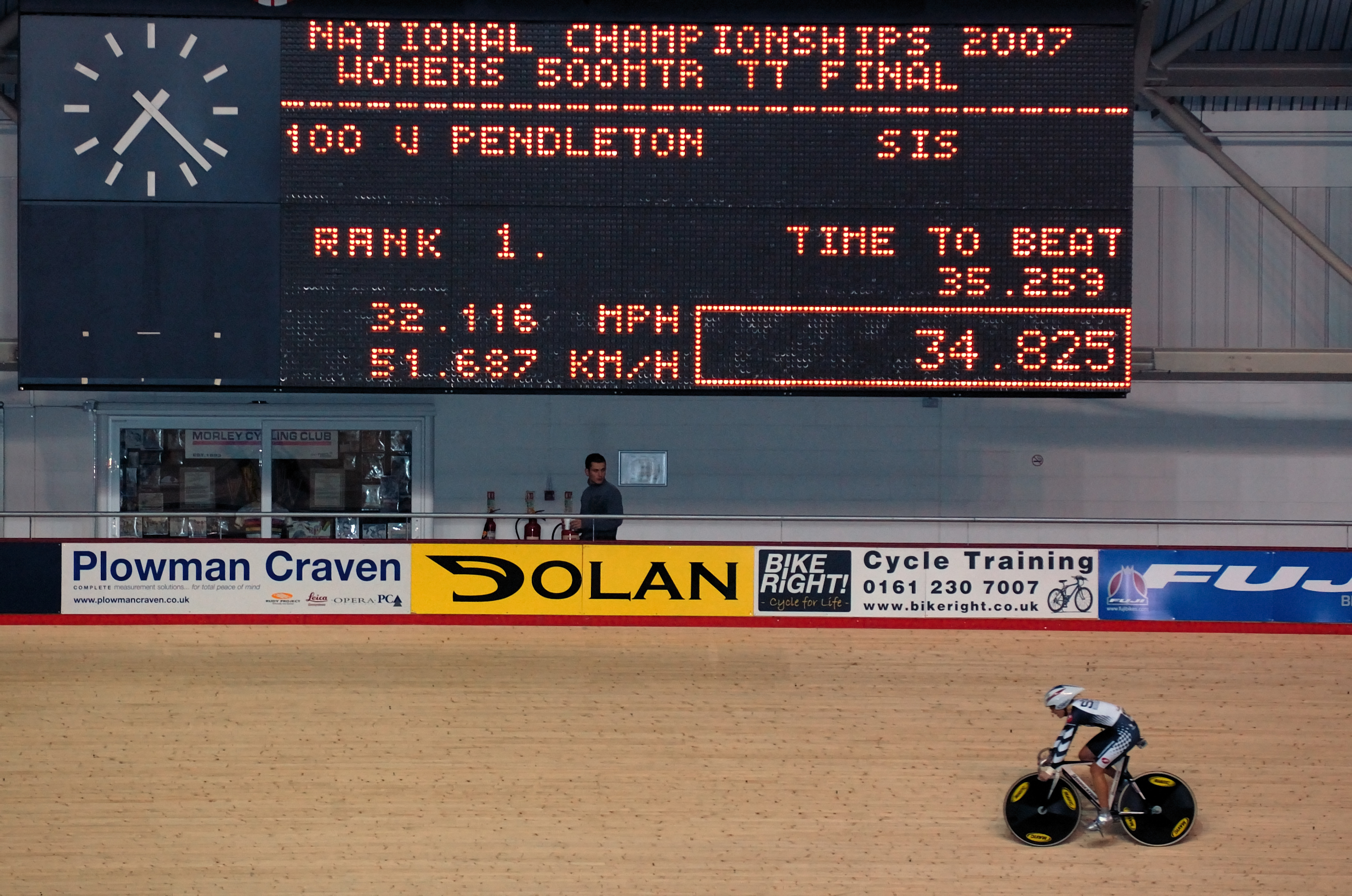
Victoria Pendleton in 2007

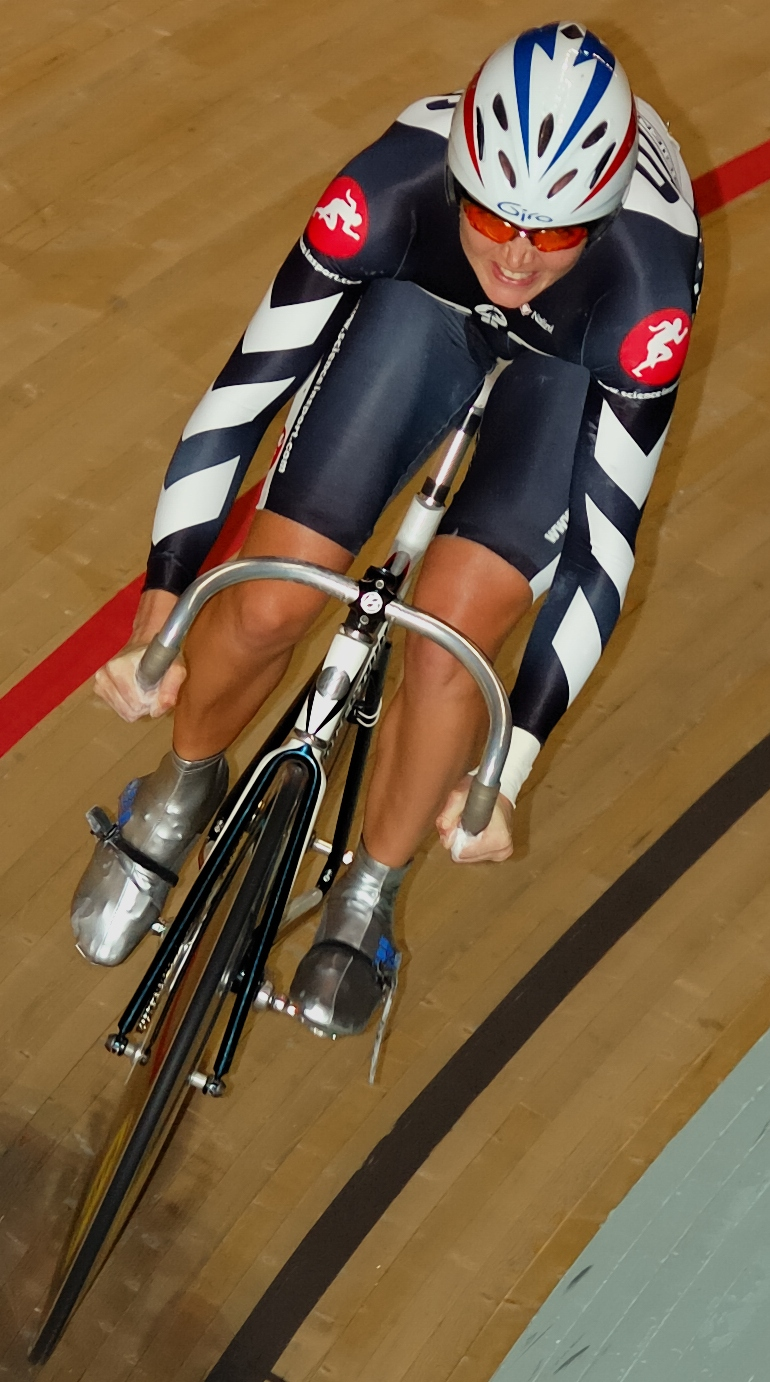
Pendleton in 2007

Year	Gold	Silver	Bronze	Ref
1985	Sally Hodge	Barbara Tate	Alison Pockett	
1986				
1987	Sally Hodge	Louise Jones	Carole Langley	
1988	Sally Hodge			
1989			Sally Dawes	
1990	Louise Jones	Maxine Johnson	Sally Dawes	
1991	Louise Jones	Maxine Johnson		
1992	Sally Dawes	Louise Jones	Sally Hodge	
1993	Sally Timmis	Sally Boyden	Maxine Johnson	
1994	Maxine Johnson	Rachelle Jones	Sally Dawes	
1995	Wendy Everson	Megan Hughes	Sally Boyden	
1996	Wendy Everson	Megan Hughes	Emma Davies	
1997	Wendy Everson	Sally Boyden	Michelle Ward	
1998	Wendy Everson	Julie Forrester	Melanie Szubrycht	
1999	Julie Forrester	Wendy Everson	Denise Hampson	
2000	Julie Forrester	Denise Hampson	Wendy Everson	
2001	Julie Forrester	Victoria Pendleton	Denise Hampson	
2002	Victoria Pendleton	Denise Hampson	Emily Forde	
2003	Victoria Pendleton	Denise Hampson	Kate Cullen	
2004	Victoria Pendleton	Kate Cullen	Katrina Hair	
2005	Victoria Pendleton	Lorna Webb	Janet Birkmyre	
2006	Victoria Pendleton	Anna Blyth	Janet Birkmyre	
2007	Victoria Pendleton	Anna Blyth	Jessica Varnish	
2008	Anna Blyth	Helen Scott	Alison Chisholm	
2009	Victoria Pendleton	Jessica Varnish	Becky James	
2010	Victoria Pendleton	Becky James	Jessica Varnish	
2011	Jessica Varnish	Becky James	Laura Trott	
2012	Becky James	Victoria Williamson	Dannielle Khan	
2013	Jessica Varnish	Victoria Williamson	Dannielle Khan	
2014	Jessica Varnish	Victoria Williamson	Katy Marchant	
2015	Katy Marchant	Victoria Williamson	Eleanor Richardson	
2017	Dannielle Khan	Rachel James	Jessica Crampton	
2018	Katy Marchant	Lauren Bate	Jessica Crampton	
2019	Ellie Coster	Jessica Crampton	Lucy Grant	
2020	Lauren Bell	Emma Finucane	Ellie Stone	
2021 not held due to COVID-19
2022	Ellie Stone	Lauren Bell	Emma Finucane	
2023	Emma Finucane	Sophie Capewell	Lauren Bell	
2024	Rhianna Parris-Smith	Milly Tanner	Lowri Thomas	
2025	not held			
2026	to be held in Glasgow, 25 Jan 2026			

== Junior ==
Extended content

Men's Junior Race

Year	Gold	Silver	Bronze
Kilo
1977	Brad Thurrell	Russell Williams	Kevin Reilly
1978	Brad Thurrell	Gary Sadler	Paul Curran
1979	Shaun Wallace	Gary Sadler	
1987	Simon Duckitt	Roger Ward	Jon Munns
1989	Paul J Barber		
1993	Richard Prince	Andrew Mummery	James Taylor
1994	Andrew Mummery	James Taylor	David George
1998	Bradley Wiggins	Ben Hallam	G. Wiseman
1999	D Heald	David Heaven	Ben Hallam
2000	Ross Edgar	Kieran Page	David Heaven
2001	Ross Edgar	Matthew Haynes	Kieran Page
2003	Mark Cavendish	Matthew Crampton	Geraint Thomas
2004	Matthew Crampton	Ross Sander	Tom Smith
2005	Steven Burke	Shane Charlton	Jason Kenny
2006	Peter Kennaugh	Christian Lyte	David Daniell
2007	David Daniell	Christian Lyte	Steven Hill
2008	Steven Hill	Peter Mitchel	Andrew Fenn
2009	Kian Emadi	Daniel McLay	George Atkins
2010	Kian Emadi	Callum Skinner	Lewis Oliva
2011	Matt Rotherham	Christopher Latham	Jack Cracknell
2012	Tom Arnstein	Sassan Emadi	Andrew Leveton
2013	Matthew Gibson	Leon Gledhill	Tom Arnstein
2014	Joe Holt	Matthew Gibson	Joseph Truman
2015	Joseph Truman	Thomas Rotherham	Joe Holt
2016	Rhys Britton	Jake Stewart	Hamish Turnbull
2017	Ethan Vernon	Rhys Britton	Harvey McNaughton

Women's Junior Race

Year	Gold	Silver	Bronze
500m TT
2002	Jacqui Marshall	Katherine Hill	Samantha Colley
2003	Nikki Harris	Jo Tindley	Jenny Middlehurst
2004	Amy Hunt	Jo Tindley	Jenny Middlehurst
2005	Anna Blyth	Elizabeth Armitstead	Lucy Ayres
2006	Anna Blyth	Lucy Ayres	Elizabeth Armitstead
2007	Becky James	Jess Varnish	Hannah Mayho
2008	Jess Varnish	Helen Scott	Hannah Mayho
2009	Becky James	Laura Trott	Jessica Booth
2010	Laura Trott	Victoria Williamson	Jessica Crampton
2011	Victoria Williamson	Lucy Garner	Rosie Blount
2012	Rosie Blount	Dannielle Khan	Jessica Crampton
2013	Dannielle Khan	Sophie Capewell	Ellie Coster
2014	Ellie Coster	Grace Garner	Sophie Capewell
2015	Sophie Capewell	Grace Garner	Ellie Dickinson
2016	Sophie Capewell	Lauren Bate	Ellie Dickinson
2017	Lauren Bate	Georgia Hilleard	Luisa Steele

== Youth ==
Extended content

Male Youth Race

Year	Gold	Silver	Bronze
500m TT
1991	Andrew Mummery	Steve Kennedy	
1995	Stephen MacMillan		
1998	George Holland	Kristian Story	Richard Sutcliffe
1999	Ross Edgar	J Wood	Steve Harrison
2000	Matthew Haynes	Tom White	Geraint Thomas
2001	Geraint Thomas	Jason Cattermole	Arron Briggs
2003	Tom Smith	Jason Kenny	Shane Charlton
2004	Andrew Fenn	Steven Burke	Jason Kenny
2005	David Daniell	Christian Lyte	Adam Blythe
2006	Andrew Fenn	Tom Buck	Steven Hill
2007	Luc Jones	Kevin Stewart	Kian Emadi
2008	Kian Emadi	Jordan Howell-Christie	John Paul
2009	John Paul	Robert Lambton	Alex Minting
2010	James Berryman	Alex Minting	Matthew Rotherham
2011	Ryan Whatmough	Ryan Owens	Rob Westwood
2012	Jack Hoyle	Leon Gledhill	Thomas Scammell
2013	Joseph Truman	Jack Carlin	Thomas Rotherham
2014	Alex Joliffe	Jack Plumley	Frank Longstaff
2015	Hamish Turnbull	Rhys Britton	Jake Stewart
2016	Alistair Fielding	Caleb Hill	Ethan Vernon
2017	Alfred George	Daniel Cooper	James Bunting

Female Youth Race

Year	Gold	Silver	Bronze
500m TT
1998	Nicole Cooke	Laura Hewitt	Femke van Schelven
1999	Nicole Cooke	Claire Dixon	J Webb
2000	Samantha Ashford	Nicki Lloyd	Kimberley Walsh
2001	Katherine Hill	Samantha Ashford	Abby Jackson
2003	Jenny Middlehurst	Kimberley Blythe	Becky Figgitt
2004	Anna Blyth	Becky Figgitt	Jenny Middlehurst
2005	Joanne Wilman	Jess Varnish	Lara Wann
2006	Becky James	Jess Varnish	Laura Trott
2007	Becky James	Laura Trott	Joanne Wilman
2008	Laura Trott	Hannah Barnes	Ruby Miller
2009	Hannah Barnes	Lucy Garner	Sarah Crowley
2010	Sarah Crowley	Jessica Crampton	Amy Roberts
2011	Dannielle Khan	Emily Nelson	Ellie Coster
2012	Hannah Blount	Ellie Coster	Grace Garner
2013	Sophie Capewell	Charlotte Broughton	Grace Garner
2014	Sophie Capewell	Eleanor Dickinson	Lauren Bate-Lowe
2015	Lauren Bate-Lowe	Jessica Roberts	Georgia Hilleard
2016	Ellie Russell	Ella Barnwell	Esme Niblett
2017	Ella Barnwell	Aleshia Mellor	Emma Finucane
