= 2018 British National Track Championships =

- Venue: Manchester, England
- Date: 26–28 January 2018
- Velodrome: Manchester Velodrome

The 2018 British National Track Championships were a series of track cycling competitions held from 26–28 January 2018 at the Manchester Velodrome. They are organised and sanctioned by British Cycling, and were open to British cyclists. The championships were sponsored by HSBC.

== Medal summary ==
=== Men's Events ===
Event	Gold	Silver	Bronze
1 Km Time Trial	Joseph Truman	Callum Skinner	Kian Emadi
Sprint	Jack Carlin	Lewis Oliva	Matt Rotherham
Keirin	Lewis Oliva	Joseph Truman	Alex Jolliffe
Team sprint	North West Region A & SES Racing; Jack Carlin; Jason Kenny; Ryan Owens	Sportcity Velo; Joel Partington; Thomas Rotherham; Matt Rotherham	Team Terminator, Glasgow & Speedflex; Alex Jolliffe; Lewis Stewart; Hamish Turnbull
Individual Pursuit	Charlie Tanfield	Daniel Bigham	John Archibald
Team pursuit	100% ME; Rhys Britton; Ethan Hayter; Matthew Walls; Fred Wright	Team KGF; Daniel Bigham; Charlie Tanfield; Jacob Tipper; Jonathan Wale	Team KGF; John Archibald; Harry Tanfield; Ethan Vernon; Simon Wilson
Points race	John Archibald	Ethan Hayter	Fred Wright
Scratch race	Oliver Wood	Rhys Britton	Matthew Walls

=== Women's Events ===
Event	Gold	Silver	Bronze
500m time trial	Katy Marchant	Lauren Bate	Jessica Crampton
Sprint	Katy Marchant	Sophie Capewell	Katie Archibald
Keirin	Jessica Crampton	Lauren Bate	Sophie Capewell
Team sprint	Wolverhampton Wheelers & Team Terminator; Lauren Bate; Georgia Hilleard	Peebles CC & Glasgow Wheelers; Lusia Steele; Lucy Grant	Peckham Challengers & Team Terminator; Sophie Capewell; Blaine Ridge-Davis
Individual Pursuit	Katie Archibald	Emily Nelson	Emily Kay
Team pursuit	Team Breeze; Abigail Dentus; Jenny Holl; Rebecca Raybould; Jessica Roberts	Backstedt Cycling; Elynor Bäckstedt; Isabel Ellis; Lucy Nelson; Ellie Russell	Liv Cycling Club; Ella Barnwell; Anna Docherty; Pfeiffer Georgi; Amelia Sharpe
Points race	Katie Archibald	Emily Kay	Jessica Roberts
Scratch race	Katie Archibald	Ellie Dickinson	Emily Nelson
