= Katy Marchant =

English former track cyclist (born 1993)

Katy Marchant MBE
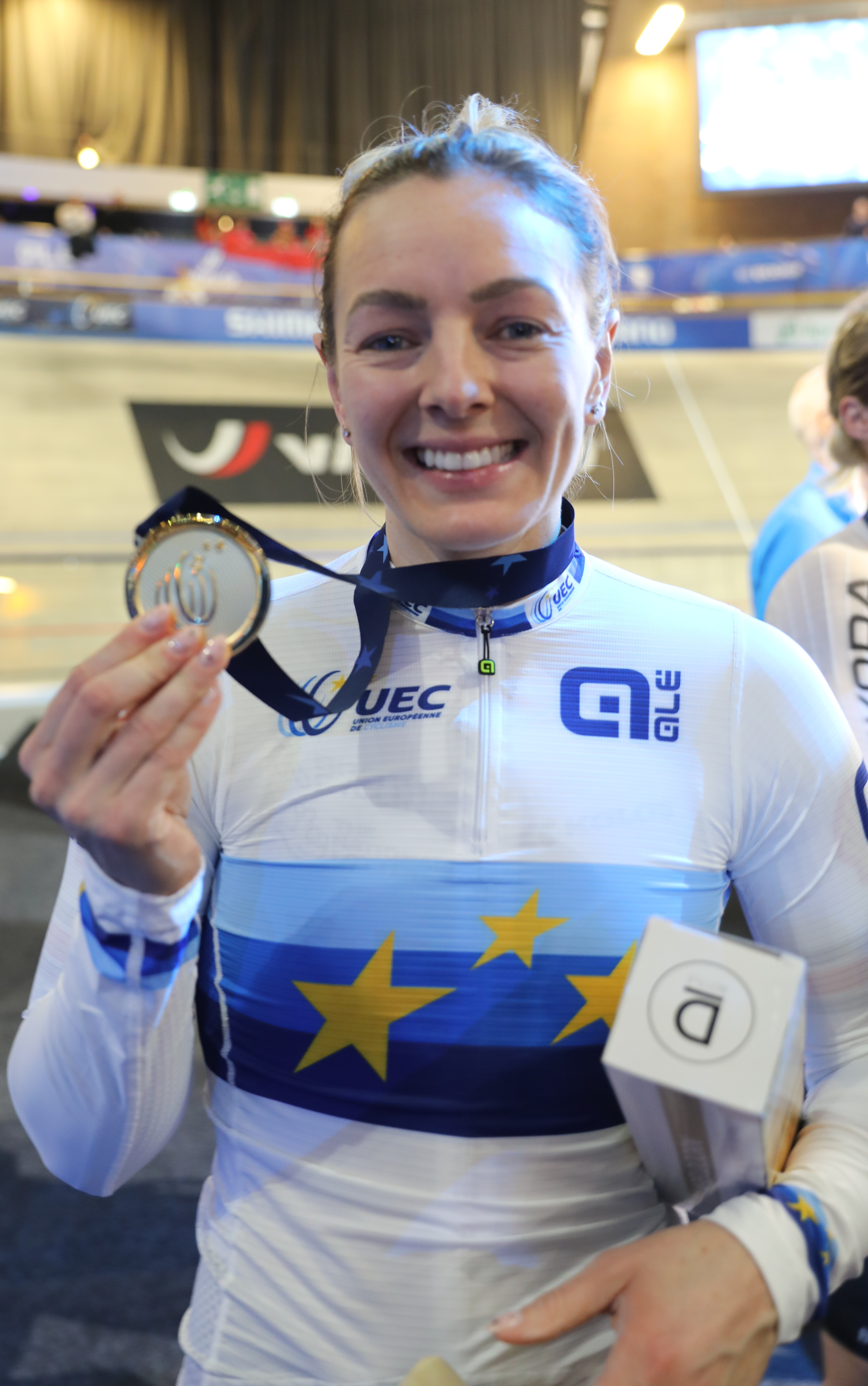
- Marchant in 2024

Personal information
- Full name: Katy Louise Nicholls
- Born: Katy Louise Marchant; 30 January 1993 (age 33) Leeds, England, United Kingdom
- Height: 170 cm (5 ft 7 in)
- Weight: 72 kg (159 lb)

Cycling career
- Sport: Cycling
- Discipline: Track cycling
- Role: Rider
Medal record
Women's track cycling
Representing Great Britain
Olympic Games
Gold medal – first place	2024 Paris	Team sprint
Bronze medal – third place	2016 Rio de Janeiro	Sprint
World Championships
Gold medal – first place	2024 Ballerup	Team sprint
Bronze medal – third place	2024 Ballerup	500 m time trial
Bronze medal – third place	2024 Ballerup	Keirin
European Championships
Gold medal – first place	2024 Apeldoorn	500 m time trial
Silver medal – second place	2023 Grenchen	Team sprint
Silver medal – second place	2024 Apeldoorn	Team sprint
Representing England
Commonwealth Games
Silver medal – second place	2026 Glasgow	Team sprint
Bronze medal – third place	2018 Gold Coast	Team sprint

Katy Louise Nicholls (née Marchant, born 30 January 1993) is a British former track cyclist who specialised in the keirin, sprint, team sprint and track time trial disciplines. She is an Olympic and world champion in the team sprint, and a European champion in the 500 m time trial.

Marchant began her sporting career as a heptathlete and represented Great Britain at the 2012 World Junior Championships. She switched to track cycling in 2013, and became the European under-23 champion in the keirin in 2015. She also won four national titles that year, and the following year, at the 2016 Summer Olympics, she won a bronze medal in the sprint. In 2018, she won a bronze medal in the team sprint at the Commonwealth Games and won her first World Cup gold medal the following year in the keirin. In 2024, she became the European champion in the 500 m time trial, and an Olympic and world champion in the team sprint. She won a silver medal in the team sprint at the 2026 Commonwealth Games, before announcing her retirement from cycling on 29 September that same year.

== Early life, heptathlon and switch to cycling ==
Katy Louise Marchant was born on 30 January 1993 in Leeds, England. She was educated at Brigshaw High School, and has a sister. Marchant began her sporting career as a heptathlete, and trained alongside Jessica Ennis at the English Institute of Sport in Sheffield. Coached by Toni Minichiello, she represented Great Britain in the heptathlon at the 2012 World Junior Championships. Her switchover to cycling was instigated by Minichiello, who noticed that she was producing an unusually high power output while training on an exercise bike. He spoke to a former coach at British Cycling who suggested that they contact the organisation. Marchant had previously only cycled as a leisure activity and had no experience of track cycling.

Following a test session with British Cycling in January 2013, she subsequently undertook a six-week trial and faced a decision whether to change sports. She chose to switch to track cycling full-time, and in April 2013 was given a place in the Olympic Academy Programme as a sprint cyclist. Explaining the switch, Marchant said: "the British Cycling coaches were really encouraged by what they had seen from me and they were quite excited, so I thought, 'Why not give it a shot?'"

== Cycling career ==
=== 2013–20: National champion and Olympic bronze medallist ===
Marchant won three medals at the 2013 British National Track Championships. In July 2014, she won a bronze medal in the team sprint with Rosie Blount at the under-23 European Championships, and also secured a further bronze medal in the keirin. In September, at the 2014 National Championships, Marchant won four medals: two silver and two bronze. In the sprint, she was defeated by Jessica Varnish in the final, and she finished runner-up again in the team sprint alongside Victoria Williamson. She also finished third in both the 500 m time trial and the keirin.

In July 2015, Marchant became the under-23 European keirin champion. Earlier in the competition, she and teammate Williamson claimed the silver medal in the team sprint. In September, she won four titles at the 2015 National Championships: the sprint, 500m time trial, keirin and the team sprint. In the sprint, she overcame Becky James in the final to win her first senior national title. In January 2016, Marchant and Varnish won a silver medal in the team sprint at the 2015–16 World Cup event in Hong Kong.

Marchant and Varnish then finished fifth at the 2016 World Championships, missing out on a place for the team sprint at the 2016 Summer Olympics. Only five European nations could qualify for the event and Great Britain finished sixth in the overall standings for qualification. The pair were both angry with British Cycling and blamed them for the situation. They felt that British Cycling had got their selection policy wrong by fielding 'less proven' team members into races during the qualifying period, with Marchant saying they had missed out through no fault of their own. British Cycling's lead coach, Iain Dyer, dismissed this, saying they had "no reason to feel let down". He also said that with hindsight, British Cycling wouldn't have changed much. Shane Sutton, the technical director of British Cycling, said that Marchant and Varnish needed to accept responsibility and that their emotional response to the matter had affected their relationships with the coaching staff.

Competing in the Rio Olympic Velodrome at the 2016 Summer Olympics, Marchant won a bronze medal in the sprint event. She was defeated by German rider Kristina Vogel in the semi-finals but then overcame Dutch cyclist Elis Ligtlee in the bronze-medal match. One month after the conclusion of the Olympic Games, she travelled to Izu to attend the Japan Keirin School to try and improve her skills in the discipline. Marchant was the only British female sprinter to appear at the 2017 World Championships, and she was eliminated in the first round of the sprint. Afterwards, she said she had been lacking "a little bit of zing" since the conclusion of the previous Olympic Games.

In the 2017–18 World Cup, Marchant secured a silver medal in the keirin at the event in Milton, Canada. This marked her first ever individual medal in a World Cup competition. In January 2018, at the National Championships, she won the 500 m time trial and sprint titles. In April, she teamed-up with Lauren Bate to win a bronze medal in the team sprint at the 2018 Commonwealth Games in Gold Coast, Australia. She also finished sixth in the 500 m time trial. The following January, during the 2018–19 World Cup, Marchant won a silver medal in the keirin at the meeting in Cambridge, New Zealand. Later in the year, she finished first in the keirin at the 2019–20 World Cup event in Glasgow after beating Emma Hinze of Germany in a photo finish.

=== 2021–2026: Olympic and world champion ===
Marchant was named to Great Britain's cycling squad for the 2020 Summer Olympics in Tokyo. In the quarter-finals of the keirin, she was involved in a crash that ended her participation in the event. Marchant stated: "I think that's just bike racing - wrong place, wrong time." In the sprint, she was eliminated in the quarter-finals by Lee Wai Sze of Hong Kong. In April 2022, she revealed that she was expecting her first child. She stated that she would return to racing, explaining: "On the plane back [from Tokyo] I felt I was not quite finished, I still had things I wanted to do, and once I found out I was pregnant, something else came over me and I thought, 'I'm definitely not done'. I love a challenge and I'd really like to give this a go."

In January 2023, at the National Championships, Marchant was a member of the trio that won the team sprint title. She also finished runner-up in the keirin to Emma Finucane. The following month, she won a silver medal alongside Finucane and Lauren Bell in the team sprint at the 2023 European Track Championships in Grenchen, Switzerland. The trio lost to Germany in the final. At the 2023 Track Nations Cup in Milton, Marchant won a bronze medal in the keirin. She was promoted to third, after Canadian cyclist Lauriane Genest, who originally crossed the line in second place, was relegated due to a rules infraction.

At the 2024 European Track Championships in Apeldoorn, Netherlands, Marchant became the first British woman to be the European champion in the 500 m time trial. She finished 0.037 seconds clear of French rider Taky Marie-Divine Kouamé. She also won a silver medal in the team sprint alongside Finucane, Sophie Capewell and Lowri Thomas. In the 2024 Track Nations Cup event in Adelaide, she won a gold medal in the team sprint (with Finucane and Capewell) and a silver medal in the keirin. At the next leg of the series in Hong Kong, Marchant, Finucane and Capewell again finished first in the team sprint to secure back-to-back wins. Prior to these victories, no British women's sprint team had won an international gold medal since 2012.

At the 2024 Summer Olympics in Paris, Marchant, again riding with Capewell and Finucane, won the gold medal in the women's team sprint. The trio broke the world record three times during the event, ultimately setting the new record at 45.186 seconds in the final against New Zealand. It was Great Britain's first ever medal in the event. In the keirin, she finished just outside of the medal positions in fourth place.

At the 2024 UCI Track Cycling World Championships in Ballerup, Denmark, Marchant, Finucane and Capewell became the world champions in the team sprint after defeating the Netherlands in the final. Their success marked Great Britain's first world title in the women's team sprint since 2008. She additionally won bronze medals in the 500 m time trial and the keirin. In December that year, she was involved in a crash during a UCI Track Champions League meeting in London. She collided with German rider Alessa-Catriona Pröpster and the pair went over barriers and ended up in the crowd; the meeting was subsequently abandoned and Marchant was taken to hospital. It was later revealed that she had broken her arm and dislocated two fingers.

Following a 15 month hiatus, which included giving birth to her second child, Marchant returned to racing at the 2026 British National Track Championships where she exited the sprint at the quarter-final stage. At the 2026 Commonwealth Games in Glasgow, Marchant won silver in the team sprint alongside Capewell and Rhianna Parris-Smith. The trio from England were defeated by the Welsh team in the gold medal race. She also finished fifth in the keirin.

Marchant announced her retirement from professional cycling in September 2026.

== Personal life ==
Marchant married Rob Nicholls in September 2021, after the Tokyo Olympics. Their first child was born in June 2022, and their second child was born in 2025.

In 2024, it was reported that Marchant, along with other members of Team GB's cycling team, had linked up with Manchester Bike Kitchen, a local community programme that helps to promote cycling as a health initiative.

Marchant was appointed Member of the Order of the British Empire (MBE) in the 2025 New Year Honours for services to cycling.

== Major results ==
2013
British National Track Championships

2nd Team sprint (with Victoria Williamson)
2nd Keirin
3rd Sprint

2014
European Track Championships (U23)

3rd Team sprint (with Rosie Blount)
3rd Keirin

British National Track Championships

2nd Team sprint (with Victoria Williamson)
2nd Sprint
3rd Keirin
3rd 500m time trial

2015
European Track Championships (U23)

1st Keirin
2nd Team sprint (with Victoria Williamson)

British National Track Championships

1st Sprint
1st Keirin
1st Team sprint (with Jessica Varnish)
1st 500m time trial

2016
2015–16 World Cup

2nd Team sprint, Hong Kong (with Jessica Varnish)

Olympic Games

3rd Sprint

2017
2017-18 World Cup

2nd Keirin, Milton

2018
British National Track Championships

1st Sprint
1st 500m time trial

Commonwealth Games

3rd Team sprint (with Lauren Bate)

2019
2018-19 World Cup

2nd Keirin, Cambridge

2019-20 World Cup

1st Keirin, Glasgow

2023
British National Track Championships

1st Team sprint (with Emma Finucane and Milly Tanner)
2nd Keirin

European Championships

2nd Team sprint (with Emma Finucane, Lauren Bell and Sophie Capewell)

UCI Track Cycling Nations Cup

3rd Keirin, Milton

2024
European Championships

1st 500m time trial
2nd Team sprint (with Emma Finucane, Sophie Capewell and Lowri Thomas)

UCI Track Cycling Nations Cup

1st Team sprint, Adelaide (with Emma Finucane and Sophie Capewell)
2nd Keirin
1st Team sprint, Hong Kong (with Emma Finucane and Sophie Capewell)

Olympic Games

1st Team sprint (with Emma Finucane and Sophie Capewell)

UCI World Championships

1st Team sprint (with Emma Finucane and Sophie Capewell)
3rd 500 m time trial
3rd Keirin

2026
Commonwealth Games

2nd Team sprint (with Sophie Capewell and Rhianna Parris-Smith)
