= Fred Wright (cyclist) =

British cyclist (born 1999)

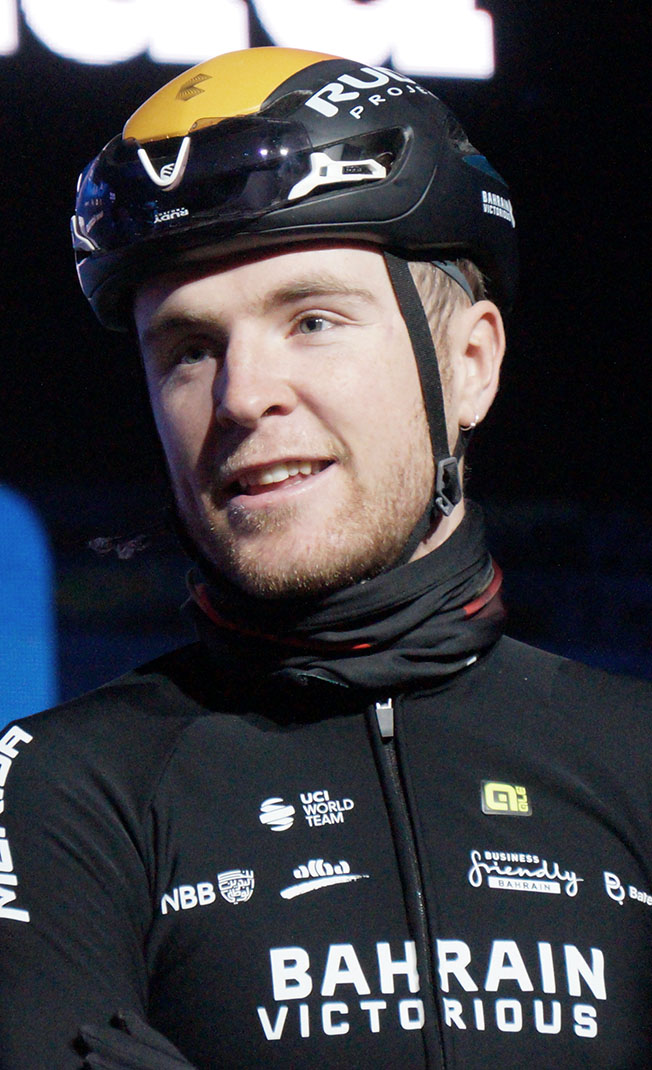
- Wright, Gent. Omloop Het Nieuwsblad 2023.

Personal information
- Full name: Alfred Brockwell Wright
- Born: 13 June 1999 (age 27) London, England
- Height: 1.84 m (6 ft 0 in)
- Weight: 75 kg (165 lb)

Cycling career
- Sport: Cycling
- Current team: Pinarello–Q36.5 Pro Cycling Team
- Disciplines: Road; Track
- Role: Rider
- Rider type: Classics specialist, Rouleur, breakaway specialist, domestique

Amateur teams
- 2018–2019: 100% Me
- 2019: CCC Team (stagiaire)

Professional team
- 2020–2025: Bahrain–McLaren
- 2026–: Pinarello–Q36.5 Pro Cycling Team

Major wins
- One-day races and Classics National Road Race Championships (2023, 2026)
Medal record
Men's road bicycle racing
Representing England
Commonwealth Games
Silver medal – second place	2022 Birmingham	Time trial

Alfred Brockwell Wright (born 13 June 1999) is a British racing cyclist, who currently rides for UCI ProTeam Pinarello–Q36.5 Pro Cycling Team.

== Career ==
Originally from south east London, Wright moved to Manchester at the age of 18 to join the British Cycling Senior Academy, with a focus on the track. In August 2019, Wright joined UCI WorldTeam CCC Team as a stagiaire for the second half of the season.

In November 2019 it was announced that Wright was joining the Bahrain–Merida team, later renamed as Bahrain–McLaren for the 2020 season. He was recruited to the team by Rod Ellingworth, the outfit's general manager, who had previously worked for the British Cycling Senior Academy. In April 2020 Wright won stage four of the Giro d'Italia Virtual, held during the Covid-19 crisis that stopped outdoor cycling races. In October 2020, he was named in the startlist for the 2020 Vuelta a España. At the Vuelta he placed fourth on the fifteenth stage of the race.

=== 2022 ===
2022 was a breakthrough season for Wright as he took a top-10 at the Tour of Flanders from the breakaway. At the Tour de France Wright was again an active breakaway rider, recording two top-10s from the break including a 2nd place, and then in the penultimate stage's 40.7 km individual time trial, Wright managed 8th place. At the Commonwealth Games a few weeks after the end of the Tour de France, Wright won a silver medal in the individual time trial event, behind Rohan Dennis, but beating a pre-race favourite, Geraint Thomas. Cyclingnews.com commented on Wright's 2022 season that "[t]he Vuelta a España was confirmation that Wright seems to be getting better and better this summer, bothering the top reaches of the results sheets in breakaways and bunch sprints", and tipped him as a contender for the World Championships road race for 2022.

==== 2022 Vuelta and controversy ====
At the 2022 Vuelta a España, Wright scored, via sprint finishes and breakaways, seven top-10 stage results, including three top-3 results, but did not manage to win a stage. During the race he was the subject of controversy: during the closing kilometres of Stage 16, a small group of four, including Wright, followed Primož Roglič, then placed second in the General Classification, as he attacked out of the peloton. As the lead quintet sprinted for the win, Roglič collided with Wright, causing the former to crash heavily while the latter was able to stay upright. Roglič crossed the line with several cuts on his right side. Two days later, Roglič issued a statement via his team: “My conclusion is that the way this crash happened is unacceptable. Not everyone saw it correctly. The crash was not caused by a bad road or a lack of safety but by a rider's behaviour. I don't have eyes on my back. Otherwise, I would have run wide. Wright came from behind and rode the handlebars out of my hands before I knew it." This statement was criticised by other riders and teams. Roglič's fellow Slovene Matej Mohorič defended Wright, saying "It's not appropriate and it's not fair to make a statement like that toward Fred [...] I think if you ask the peloton, everyone will tell you that Primož is more eager to push for position than Fred. We know that Primož crashes a lot and this is not the first time this happened."

=== 2023 ===
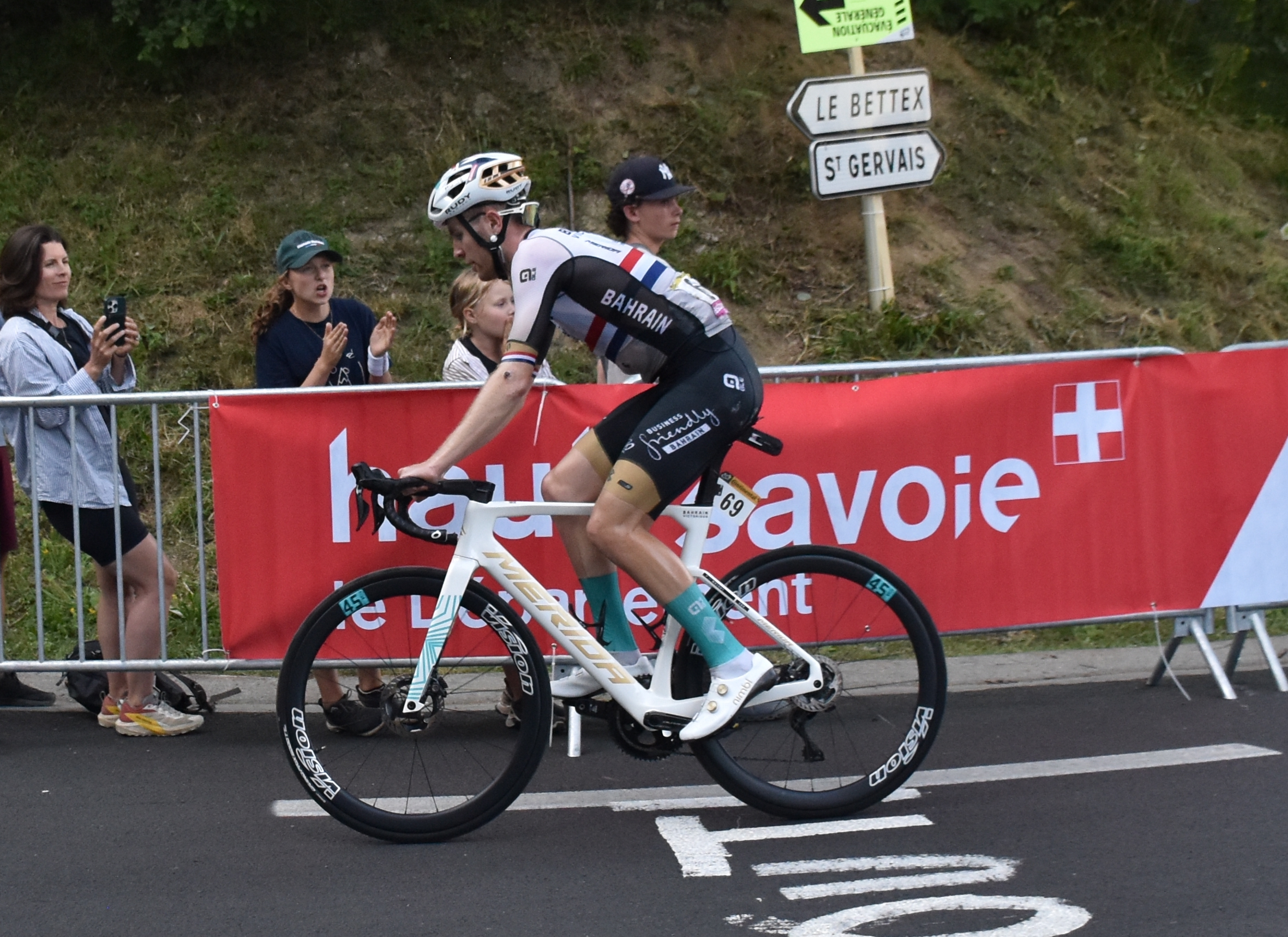
Wright at the 2023 Tour de France

On 25 June 2023, Wright earned his first professional victory, winning the elite men's race at the British National Road Race Championships, three days after a silver medal in the elite men's time trial.

=== 2024 ===
Wright made his Olympic debut on 3 August 2024, selected by British Cycling to represent Great Britain at the Paris Olympics in the men's road race, finishing 43rd.

== Personal life ==
His father is actor Philip Wright. As of 2021, Wright lived in Manchester, sharing a house with fellow racing cyclist Ethan Hayter.

== Major results ==
=== Road ===
2016
1st Overall Junior Tour of Wales
5th Overall Trofeo Karlsberg

1st Young rider classification

2017
3rd Overall Junior Tour of Wales

1st Mountains classification

2018
2nd Road race, National Under-23 Championships
2nd Overall Ronde de l'Oise

1st Young rider classification
1st Stage 3

5th Road race, National Championships
7th Overall Paris–Arras Tour
2019
1st Stage 4 Tour de l'Avenir
1st Stage 7 Giro Ciclistico d'Italia
3rd Overall Paris–Arras Tour
5th Time trial, National Under-23 Championships
2021
1st Road race, National Under-23 Championships
National Championships

2nd Road race
4th Time trial

10th Eschborn–Frankfurt
2022
Commonwealth Games

2nd Time trial
5th Road race

7th Tour of Flanders
Vuelta a España

Held after Stage 5

2023 (1 pro win)
National Championships

1st Road race
2nd Time trial

8th Tour of Flanders
2024
3rd Overall CRO Race
2025
4th Overall Renewi Tour
4th Overall Tour de la Provence
6th Hamburg Cyclassics
7th Coppa Bernocchi
7th Tour du Finistère
8th Tro-Bro Léon
9th Paris–Roubaix
10th Milan–San Remo
2026 (1)
1st Road race, National Championships
2nd Rund um Köln
2nd Grand Prix Criquielion
6th Gran Piemonte
9th Tro-Bro Léon

==== Grand Tour general classification results timeline ====
Grand Tour	2020	2021	2022	2023	2024	2025
Giro d'Italia	—	—	—	—	—	—
Tour de France	—	96	55	92	DNF	104
Vuelta a España	91	—	67	—	—	—

==== Monuments results timeline ====
Monument	2020	2021	2022	2023	2024	2025	2026
Milan–San Remo	—	148	—	79	30	10	52
Tour of Flanders	DNF	112	7	8	50	23	74
Paris–Roubaix	NH	51	99	DNF	12	9	131
Liège–Bastogne–Liège	—	—	—	—	—	—	—
Giro di Lombardia	—	—	—	—	—	—	—

Legend
—	Did not compete
DNF	Did not finish

=== Track ===
2015
1st Madison, National Junior Championships (with Ethan Hayter)
2016
1st Team pursuit, UEC European Junior Championships
3rd Madison, National Championships (with Jake Stewart)
3rd Madison, National Junior Championships (with Ethan Hayter)
2017
UEC European Junior Championships

1st Omnium
2nd Team pursuit

1st Junior Six Days of Berlin (with Jake Stewart)
National Junior Championships

2nd Individual pursuit
2nd Madison (with Jacob Vaughan)
2nd Points race

2018
1st Team pursuit, UEC European Under-23 Championships
National Championships

1st Madison (with Matt Walls)
1st Team pursuit
3rd Points race

UCI World Cup

2nd Madison, London (with Matt Walls)
3rd Team pursuit, London

2019
1st Madison, UEC European Under-23 Championships (with Matt Walls)
National Championships

1st Madison (with Rhys Britton)
2nd Omnium
2nd Team pursuit

3rd Madison, UCI World Cup, Hong Kong (with Mark Stewart)
2020
2nd Omnium, National Championships
