= 2019 British National Track Championships =

Cycling competition in Britain

- Venue: Manchester, England
- Date(s): 25–27 January 2019
- Velodrome: Manchester Velodrome

The 2019 British National Track Championships were a series of track cycling competitions held from 25–27 January 2019 at the Manchester Velodrome. They are organised and sanctioned by British Cycling, and were open to British cyclists. The championships were sponsored by HSBC.

== Medal summary ==
=== Men's Events ===
Event	Gold	Silver	Bronze
1 km Time trial	Matt Rotherham	Bede Constantinides	Jonathan Wale
Sprint	Joseph Truman	Jason Kenny	Hamish Turnbull
Keirin	Jason Kenny	Jack Carlin	Joseph Truman
Team sprint	Team Inspired & SES Racing; Jack Carlin; Jason Kenny; Philip Hindes; Ryan Owens	Slingshot; Ali Fielding; Lewis Stewart; Hamish Turnbull	Black Line; Peter Mitchell; Niall Monks; Matthew Roper; Alex Spratt
Individual Pursuit	John Archibald	Daniel Bigham	Kyle Gordon
Team pursuit	HUUB-Wattbike; John Archibald; Daniel Bigham; Charlie Tanfield; Jonathan Wale	Team Inspired; Rhys Britton; William Tidball; Ethan Vernon; Fred Wright	Wales Racing Academy; Matthew Burke; Daniel Coombe; Oscar Mingay; William Roberts; Samuel Tillett
Points	Rhys Britton	Matthew Walls	Kyle Gordon
Scratch	Ethan Hayter	Mark Stewart	William Tidball

=== Women's Events ===
Event	Gold	Silver	Bronze
500m time trial	Ellie Coster	Jessica Crampton	Lucy Grant
Sprint	Sophie Capewell	Jessica Crampton	Katie Archibald
Keirin	Jessica Crampton	Ellie Coster	Joanna Smith
Team sprint	North West Region; Shanaze Reade; Blaine Ridge-Davis	Team Terminator; Sophie Capewell; Milly Tanner	Black Line; Lusia Steele; Victoria Williamson
Individual Pursuit	Katie Archibald	Neah Evans	Eleanor Dickinson
Team pursuit	Team Breeze; Anna Docherty; Jenny Holl; Rebecca Raybould; Jessica Roberts	Team Velotec; Jennifer Holden; Sophie Lankford; Anna Morris; Molly Patch; April Tacey	Liv Cycling Club; Ella Barnwell; Eluned King; Amelia Sharpe; Elena Smith
Points	Neah Evans	Emily Nelson	Katie Archibald
Scratch	Laura Trott	Elinor Barker	Katie Archibald
