= 2017 UCI Junior Track Cycling World Championships =

- Venue: Montichiari, Italy
- Date: 23–27 August 2017

The 2017 UCI Junior Track Cycling World Championships were the 43rd annual Junior World Championships for track cycling, held at Montichiari, Italy from 23 to 27 August.

The Championships had ten events each for men and women (sprint, points race, individual pursuit, team pursuit, time trial, team sprint, keirin, madison, scratch race, omnium).

== Medal summary ==
Event	Gold	Silver	Bronze
Men's Events
Sprint	Rayan Helal; France	Dmitry Nesterov; Russia	James Brister; Australia
Points race	Oleg Kanaka; Ukraine	Ivan Gerasimov; Russia	JB Murphy; Ireland
Individual pursuit	Johan Price-Pejtersen; Denmark	Xeno Young; Ireland	Lev Gonov; Russia
Team pursuit	Lev Gonov; Gleb Syritsa; Ivan Smirnov; Dmitry Mukhomediarov; Russia	Johan Price-Pejtersen; Kristian Eriksen; Julius Johansen; Oliver Wulff Frederiksen; Matias Gunnar Malmberg; Mathias Alexander Larsen; Denmark	Joshua Scott; Corbin Strong; Aaron Wyllie; Harry Waine; New Zealand
Time trial	Pavel Perchuk; Russia	Carl Hinze; Germany	Jackson Ogle; New Zealand
Team sprint	Daniil Komkov; Dmitrii Nesterov; Pavel Rostov; Russia	Timo Bichler; Elias Edbauer; Carl Hinze; Germany	Cezary Laczkowski; Łukasz Kowal; Daniel Rochna; Poland
Keirin	Pavel Perchuk; Russia	Daniel Rochna; Poland	James Brister; Australia
Madison	Mathias Alexander Larsen; Julius Johansen; Denmark	Lev Gonov; Gleb Syritsa; Russia	Isaac Buckell; Godfrey Slattery; Australia
Scratch race	Daniel Babor; Czech Republic	Filip Prokopyszyn; Poland	Ivan Gabriel Ruiz; Argentina
Omnium	Julius Johansen; Denmark	Stephen Cuff; Australia	Uladzislau Tsimoshyk; Belarus

Event	Gold	Silver	Bronze
Women's Events
Sprint	Mathilde Gros; France	Lauren Bate-Lowe; Great Britain	Lea Friedrich; Germany
Individual pursuit	Ellesse Andrews; New Zealand	Letizia Paternoster; Italy	Elena Pirrone; Italy
Time trial	Mathilde Gros; France	Lea Friedrich; Germany	Yana Tyshenko; Russia
Points race	Maggie Coles-Lyster; Canada	Maria Novolodskaya; Russia	Chiara Consonni; Italy
Keirin	Mathilde Gros; France	Steffie van der Peet; Netherlands	Kim Hye-su; South Korea
Scratch race	Martina Fidanza; Italy	Mylène de Zoete; Netherlands	Alexandra Martin-Wallace; Australia
Team sprint	Yana Tyshenko; Polina Vashenko; Ksenia Andreeva; Russia	Emma Götz; Lea Friedrich; Germany	Lauren Bate-Lowe; Georgia Hilleard; Great Britain
Team pursuit	Martina Fidanza; Letizia Paternoster; Chiara Consonni; Vittoria Guazzini; Italy	Ellesse Andrews; Nicole Shields; Kate Smith; Emily Shearman; New Zealand	Laura Da Cruz; Clara Copponi; Marie Le Net; Valentine Fortin; France
Omnium	Letizia Paternoster; Italy	Maggie Coles-Lyster; Canada	Mylène de Zoete; Netherlands
Madison	Letizia Paternoster; Chiara Consonni; Italy	Maria Novolodskaya; Daria Malkova; Russia	Marie Le Net; Valentine Fortin; France

== Medal table ==
* Host nation (Italy)

Rank	Nation	Gold	Silver	Bronze	Total
1	Russia (RUS)	5	5	2	12
2	Italy (ITA)*	4	1	2	7
3	France (FRA)	4	0	2	6
4	Denmark (DEN)	3	1	0	4
5	New Zealand (NZL)	1	1	2	4
6	Canada (CAN)	1	1	0	2
7	Czech Republic (CZE)	1	0	0	1
7	Ukraine (UKR)	1	0	0	1
9	Germany (GER)	0	4	1	5
10	Netherlands (NED)	0	2	1	3
10	Poland (POL)	0	2	1	3
12	Australia (AUS)	0	1	4	5
13	Great Britain (GBR)	0	1	1	2
13	Ireland (IRL)	0	1	1	2
15	Argentina (ARG)	0	0	1	1
15	Belarus (BLR)	0	0	1	1
15	South Korea (KOR)	0	0	1	1
Totals (17 entries)		20	20	20	60
