= 2017 UEC European Track Championships (under-23 & junior) =

Coordinates: 40.479386°N 8.476038°W

- Venue: Sangalhos, Portugal
- Date(s): 19–23 July 2017
- Velodrome: Sangalhos Velodrome
- Nations participating: 25
- Cyclists participating: 383
- Events: 44

The 2017 UEC European Track Championships (under-23 & junior) was the 17th continental championships for European under-23 and junior track cyclists, and the 8th since the event was renamed following the reorganisation of European track cycling in 2010. The event took place at the Sangalhos Velodrome in Sangalhos, Portugal from 19 to 23 July 2017.

== Medal summary ==
=== Under 23 ===
Event	Gold		Silver		Bronze	
Men's events
Sprint	Sébastien Vigier; France		Harrie Lavreysen; Netherlands		Joseph Truman; Great Britain	
1 km time trial	Alexandr Vasyukhno; Russia	1:01.345	Joseph Truman; Great Britain	1:01.830	Sam Ligtlee; Netherlands	1:02.045
Individual pursuit	Mark Stewart; Great Britain	4:18.843	Ivo Oliveira; Portugal	4:23.221	Daniel Staniszewski; Poland	caught opponent
Team pursuit	Matthew Bostock; Ethan Hayter; Joe Holt; Matthew Walls; Great Britain		Lindsay De Vylder; Robbe Ghys; Gerben Thijssen; Sasha Weemaes; Belgium	OVL	Dawid Czubak; Szymon Krawczyk; Bartosz Rudyk; Daniel Staniszewski; Poland	4:03.441
Team sprint	Jack Carlin; Ryan Owens; Joseph Truman; Great Britain	44.167	Mikhail Dmitriyev; Alexander Dubchenko; Alexey Nosov; Russia	44.529	Michał Lewandowski; Mateusz Miłek; Patryk Rajkowski; Marcin Czyszczewski^{[Q]} Poland	44.312
Keirin	Harrie Lavreysen; Netherlands		Jiri Fanta; Czech Republic		Jack Carlin; United Kingdom	
Scratch race	Yauheni Karaliok; Belarus		Niklas Larsen; Denmark		Maxim Piskunov| Russia	
Points race	Niklas Larsen; Denmark	103 pts	Ethan Hayter; Great Britain	76 pts	Mark Downey; Ireland	72 pts
Elimination race	Rui Oliveira; Portugal		Damian Sławek; Poland		Maxim Piskunov; Russia	
Madison	Lindsay De Vylder; Robbe Ghys; Belgium	51 pts	Maxim Piskunov; Sergey Rostovtsev; Russia	31 pts	Roman Gladysh; Vitaliy Hryniv; Ukraine	31 pts
Omnium	Mark Stewart; Great Britain	121 pts	Niklas Larsen; Denmark	113 pts	Adrien Garel; France	108 pts
Women's events
Sprint	Olena Starikova; Ukraine		Pauline Grabosch; Germany		Hetty van de Wouw; Netherlands	
500 m time trial	Pauline Grabosch; Germany	33.703	Olena Starikova; Ukraine	34.423	Kyra Lamberink; Netherlands	34.562
Individual pursuit	Justyna Kaczkowska; Poland	3:32.684	Ellie Dickinson; Great Britain	3:34.948	Francesca Pattaro; Italy	3:35.417
Team pursuit	Martina Alzini; Elisa Balsamo; Marta Cavalli; Francesca Pattaro; Italy		Justyna Kaczkowska; Weronika Humelt; Nikol Płosaj; Wiktoria Pikulik; Daria Pikulik; Alicja Ratajczak^{[Q]} Poland	OVL	Franziska Brauße; Tatjana Paller; Gudrun Stock; Laura Süßemilch; Germany	4:39.028
Team sprint	Kyra Lamberink; Hetty van de Wouw; Netherlands	33.739	Mathilde Gros; Mélissandre Pain; France	35.205	Natalia Antonova; Tatiana Kiseleva; Russia	34.218
Keirin	Hetty van de Wouw; Netherlands		Tatiana Kiseleva; Russia		Mélissandre Pain; France	
Scratch race	Rachele Barbieri; Italy		Ellie Dickinson; United Kingdom		Amalie Dideriksen; Denmark	
Points race	Tatjana Paller; Germany	55 pts	Amalie Dideriksen; Denmark	43 pts	Manon Lloyd; Great Britain	42 pts
Elimination race	Emily Nelson; United Kingdom		Olivija Baleišytė; Lithuania		Ziortza Isasi; Spain	
Madison	Ellie Dickinson; Manon Lloyd; Great Britain	46 pts	Diana Klimova; Maria Petukhova; Russia	44 pts	Elisa Balsamo; Rachele Barbieri; Italy	27 pts
Omnium	Elisa Balsamo; Italy	140 pts	Ellie Dickinson; Great Britain	136 pts	Amalie Dideriksen; Denmark	134 pts

=== Junior ===
Event	Gold		Silver		Bronze	
Men's events
Sprint	Rayan Helal; France		Dmitry Nesterov; Russia		Pavel Perchuk; Russia	
1 km time trial	Pavel Perchuk; Russia	1:02.134	Carl Hinze; Germany	1:03.746	Jakub Šťastný; Czech Republic	1:03.976
Individual pursuit^{[J]}	Ivan Smirnov; Russia	3:19.050	Xeno Young; Ireland	3:22.268	Rhys Britton; Great Britain	3:20.125
Team pursuit	Lev Gonov; Dmitry Mukhomediarov; Ivan Smirnov; Gleb Syritsa; Russia	4:04.023	Rhys Britton; Joe Nally; Jake Stewart; Fred Wright; Great Britain	4:08.652	Scott Quincey; Mauro Schmid; Valère Thiébaud; Alex Vogel; Switzerland	4:08.360
Team sprint	Daniil Komkov; Dmitrii Nesterov; Pavek Rostov; Russia	44.460 WJR	Łukasz Kowal; Daniel Rochna; Krystian Ruta; Poland	46.070	Timo Bichler; Elias Edbauer; Carl Hinze; Germany	45.406
Keirin	Pavel Perchuk; Russia		Daniel Rochna; Poland		Cezary Łączkowski; Poland	
Scratch race	Daniel Babor; Czech Republic		Filip Prokopyszyn; Poland		Michele Gazzoli; Italy	
Points race	Oleg Kanaka; Ukraine	58 pts	Fabio Van den Bossche; Belgium	50 pts	Mauro Schmid; Switzerland	34 pts
Elimination race	Michele Gazzoli; Italy		JB Murphy; Ireland		Unai Iribar; Spain	
Madison	Fabio Van den Bossche; Nicolas Wernimont; Belgium	37 pts	Daniel Babor; Daniel Rybin; Czech Republic	27 pts	Rhys Britton; Jake Stewart; Great Britain	26 pts
Omnium	Fred Wright; Great Britain	134 pts	Alex Vogel; Switzerland	123 pts	Valentin Tabellion; France	111 pts
Women's events
Sprint	Mathilde Gros; France		Lea Friedrich; Germany		Steffie van der Peet; Netherlands	
500 m time trial	Mathilde Gros; France	34.672	Lea Friedrich; Germany	34.735	Lauren Bate; Great Britain	35.407
Individual pursuit ^{[J]}	Letizia Paternoster; Italy	2:22.140^{[R]}	Maria Novolodskaya; Russia	2:25.499	Mylene De Zoete; Netherlands	2:25.166
Team pursuit	Chiara Consonni; Letizia Paternoster; Martina Fidanza; Vittoria Guazzini; Italy	4:30.725	Amber van der Hulst; Kirstie van Haaften; Marit Raaijmakers; Mylene De Zoete; Phaedra Krol^{[Q]} Netherlands	4:35.429	Anastasia Lukashenko; Daria Malkova; Karine Minasyan; Maria Novolodskaya; Russia	4:38.775
Team sprint	Polina Vashenko; Yana Tyshenko; Ksenia Andreeva^{[Q]} Russia	35.107	Emma Götz; Lea Friedrich; Germany	35.361	Georgia Hilleard; Lauren Bate; Great Britain	35.387
Keirin	Mathilde Gros; France		Martina Fidanza; Italy		Lauren Bate; United Kingdom	
Scratch race	Martina Fidanza; Italy		Petra Ševčíková; Czech Republic		Jenny Holl; United Kingdom	
Points race	Olha Kulynych; Ukraine	45 pts	Aksana Salauyeva; Belarus	35 pts	Valentine Fortin; France	31 pts
Elimination race	Letizia Paternoster; Italy		Maria Martins; Portugal		Pfeiffer Georgi; United Kingdom	
Madison	Italy	32 pts	Russia	25 pts	Great Britain	21 pts
Omnium	Letizia Paternoster; Italy	137 pts	Olha Kulynych; Ukraine	115 pts	Maria Novolodskaya; Russia	115 pts

=== Notes ===
- ^{^{J}} In junior competitions, individual pursuits are contested over 3km/2km for men/women respectively.
- ^{^{Q}} Competitors named in italics contested the qualifying rounds only.
- ^{^{R}} In the qualifying round, Letizia Paternoster clocked a 2:20.927 WJR.

== Medal table ==
Rank	Nation	Gold	Silver	Bronze	Total
1	Italy (ITA)	10	1	3	14
2	Russia (RUS)	7	7	6	20
3	Great Britain (GBR)	7	6	11	24
4	France (FRA)	5	1	4	10
5	Netherlands (NED)	3	2	5	10
6	Ukraine (UKR)	3	2	1	6
7	Germany (GER)	2	5	2	9
8	Belgium (BEL)	2	2	0	4
9	Poland (POL)	1	5	4	10
10	Denmark (DEN)	1	3	2	6
11	Czech Republic (CZE)	1	3	1	5
12	Portugal (POR)	1	2	0	3
13	Belarus (BLR)	1	1	0	2
14	Ireland (IRL)	0	2	1	3
15	Switzerland (SUI)	0	1	2	3
16	Lithuania (LTU)	0	1	0	1
17	Spain (ESP)	0	0	2	2
Totals (17 entries)		44	44	44	132
