= Cycling at the 2018 Commonwealth Games – Men's individual pursuit =

Cycling Track – Men's individual pursuit at the 2018 Commonwealth Games
- Venue: Anna Meares Velodrome
- Dates: 6 April
- Competitors: 27 from 11 nations
- Winning time: 4:15.952

Medalists
gold medal	Charlie Tanfield	England
silver medal	John Archibald	Scotland
bronze medal	Dylan Kennett	New Zealand

The men's individual pursuit at the 2018 Commonwealth Games was part of the cycling programme, which took place on 6 April 2018.

== Records ==
Prior to this competition, the existing world and Games records were as follows:

World record	Jack Bobridge (AUS)	4:10.534	Sydney, Australia	2 February 2011
Games record	Jack Bobridge (AUS)	4:14.845	New Delhi, India	5 October 2010

== Schedule ==
The schedule is as follows:

All times are Australian Eastern Standard Time (UTC+10)

Date	Time	Round
Friday 6 April 2018	15:17	Qualifying
Friday 6 April 2018	20:24 / 20:31	Finals

== Results ==
=== Qualifying ===
The two fastest riders advance to the gold medal final. The next two fastest riders advance to the bronze medal final.

Rank	Riders	Time	Behind	Notes
1	Charlie Tanfield (ENG)	4:11.455	—	QG, GR
2	John Archibald (SCO)	4:13.068	+1.613	QG
3	Dylan Kennett (NZL)	4:13.414	+1.959	QB
4	Jordan Kerby (AUS)	4:13.531	+2.076	QB
5	Sam Welsford (AUS)	4:13.595	+2.140	
6	Daniel Bigham (ENG)	4:17.174	+5.719	
7	Kelland O'Brien (AUS)	4:17.401	+5.946	
8	Ethan Hayter (ENG)	4:17.477	+6.022	
9	Kyle Gordon (SCO)	4:18.494	+7.039	
10	Samuel Harrison (WAL)	4:19.429	+7.974	
11	Mark Stewart (SCO)	4:20.256	+8.801	
12	Jared Gray (NZL)	4:22.752	+11.297	
13	Nicholas Kergozou (NZL)	4:23.429	+11.974	
14	Xeno Young (NIR)	4:24.568	+13.113	
15	Adam Jamieson (CAN)	4:24.915	+13.460	
16	Derek Gee (CAN)	4:25.919	+14.464	
17	Ethan Vernon (WAL)	4:27.548	+16.093	
18	Jay Lamoureux (CAN)	4:30.200	+18.745	
19	Steven van Heerden (RSA)	4:32.921	+21.466	
20	Marcus Christie (NIR)	4:35.402	+23.947	
21	Gert Fouche (RSA)	4:35.783	+24.328	
22	Matthew Draper (IOM)	4:38.602	+27.147	
23	Muhammad Danie Al Edy Suhaidee (MAS)	4:39.502	+28.047	
24	Manjeet Singh (IND)	4:39.744	+28.289	
25	Eiman Firdaus Mohd Zamri (MAS)	4:43.211	+31.756	
26	Joshua van Wyk (RSA)	4:43.335	+31.880	
27	Muhammad Nur Aiman Rosli (MAS)	4:45.314	+33.859	

=== Finals ===
The final classification is determined in the medal finals.

Rank	Riders	Time	Gap	Notes
Bronze medal final
3rd place, bronze medalist(s)	Dylan Kennett (NZL)	4:18.373	—	
4	Jordan Kerby (AUS)	4:22.462	+4.089	
Gold medal final
1st place, gold medalist(s)	Charlie Tanfield (ENG)	4:15.952	—	
2nd place, silver medalist(s)	John Archibald (SCO)	4:16.656	+0.704	
