= 2020 British National Track Championships =

- Venue: Manchester, England
- Date(s): 24–26 January 2020
- Velodrome: Manchester Velodrome

The 2020 British National Track Championships are a series of track cycling competitions. The National Track Championships (excluding certain events) were held from 24 to 26 January 2020 at the Manchester Velodrome. They are organised and sanctioned by British Cycling, and are open to British cyclists. The championships are sponsored by HSBC.

The Derny, Omnium, Madison and Tandem events will take place at various venues throughout the year.

== Medal summary ==
=== Men's Events ===
Event	Gold	Silver	Bronze
1 km Time trial	Jonathan Wale	Daniel Bigham	Kyle Gordon
Sprint	Hamish Turnbull	Ali Fielding	Alex Spratt
Keirin	Joseph Truman	Matthew Roper	Niall Monks
Team sprint	Team Inspired; Joseph Truman; Jack Carlin; Ryan Owens	Slingshot; Hamish Turnbull; Ali Fielding; James Bunting	Black Line; Harry Ledingham-Horn; Hayden Norris; Ed Lowe
Individual Pursuit	John Archibald	Jonathan Wale	Daniel Bigham
Team pursuit	HUUB-Wattbike Test Team; John Archibald; Jonathan Wale; Daniel Bigham; William Perrett	Team Inspired; Rhys Britton; Alfred George; Ethan Vernon; Samuel Watson	AeroLab Ward WheelZ A Sebastian Garry; Michael Gill; Tom Ward; Oliver Hucks
Points	Rhys Britton	William Roberts	William Perrett
Scratch	Rhys Britton	Max Rushby	Ethan Vernon
Derny (Derby Arena)	19 September	cancelled due to the COVID-19 pandemic.	
Madison (Derby Arena)	14 November	cancelled due to the COVID-19 pandemic.	
Omnium (Lee Valley VeloPark)	10 October	cancelled due to the COVID-19 pandemic.	
Tandem (Wales National Velodrome)	5 September	cancelled due to the COVID-19 pandemic.	

=== Women's Events ===
Event	Gold	Silver	Bronze
500m time trial	Lauren Bell	Emma Finucane	Ellie Stone
Sprint	Lauren Bate	Milly Tanner	Lauren Bell
Keirin	Lauren Bell	Emma Finucane	Ellie Coster
Team sprint	Slingshot; Blaine Ridge-Davis; Milly Tanner	Scotland B Lucy Grant; Lusia Steele	Scotland A Lauren Bell; Ellie Stone
Individual Pursuit	Josie Knight	Anna Morris	Megan Barker
Team pursuit	Team Breeze; Anna Docherty; Josie Knight; Ella Barnwell; Anna Shackley	University of Nottingham; Isabel Ellis; Sophie Lankford; Matilda Gurney; Charlotte Mitchell	Central Region; Millie Couzens; Anna Wadsworth; Eva Callinan; Libby Smithson
Points	Anna Shackley	Jenny Holl	Sophie Lewis
Scratch	Ella Barnwell	Josie Knight	Jenny Holl
Derny (Derby Arena)	19 September	cancelled due to the COVID-19 pandemic.	
Madison (Derby Arena)	14 November	cancelled due to the COVID-19 pandemic.	
Omnium (Lee Valley VeloPark)	10 October	cancelled due to the COVID-19 pandemic.	
