= 2024 UCI Track Cycling World Championships – Women's 500 m time trial =

Women's 500 m time trial at the 2024 UCI Track Cycling World Championships
- Venue: Ballerup Super Arena
- Location: Ballerup, Denmark
- Dates: 19 October
- Competitors: 23 from 14 nations
- Winning time: 32.863

Medalists
gold medal	Yana Burlakova	Individual Neutral Athletes
silver medal	Sophie Capewell	Great Britain
bronze medal	Katy Marchant	Great Britain

The Women's 500 m time trial competition at the 2024 UCI Track Cycling World Championships was held on 19 October 2024.

== Results ==
=== Qualifying ===
The qualifying was started at 12:30. The top eight riders qualified for the final.

Rank	Name	Nation	Time	Behind	Notes
1	Yana Burlakova	Individual Neutral Athletes	33.002		Q
2	Sophie Capewell	Great Britain	33.013	+0.011	Q
3	Katy Marchant	Great Britain	33.157	+0.155	Q
4	Emma Finucane	Great Britain	33.189	+0.187	Q
5	Martha Bayona	Colombia	33.210	+0.208	Q
6	Miriam Vece	Italy	33.355	+0.353	Q
7	Kristina Clonan	Australia	33.362	+0.360	Q
8	Jiang Yulu	China	33.368	+0.366	Q
9	Alessia McCaig	Australia	33.709	+0.707	
10	Kimberly Kalee	Netherlands	33.776	+0.774	
11	Mathilde Gros	France	33.835	+0.833	
12	Clara Schneider	Germany	34.035	+1.033	
13	Yuan Liying	China	34.271	+1.269	
14	Molly McGill	Australia	34.390	+1.388	
15	Kyra Lamberink	Netherlands	34.398	+1.396	
16	Paulina Petri	Poland	34.458	+1.456	
17	Nurul Izzah Izzati Mohd Asri	Malaysia	34.548	+1.546	
18	Alessa-Catriona Pröpster	Germany	34.779	+1.777	
19	Nikola Seremak	Poland	34.806	+1.804	
20	Jessica Salazar	Mexico	34.851	+1.849	
21	Marith Vanhove	Belgium	35.050	+2.048	
22	Yeung Cho Yi	Hong Kong	35.335	+2.333	
23	Anis Amira Rosidi	Malaysia	36.044	+3.042	

=== Final ===
The final was held at 18:32.

Rank	Name	Nation	Time	Behind	Notes
1st place, gold medalist(s)	Yana Burlakova	Individual Neutral Athletes	32.863		
2nd place, silver medalist(s)	Sophie Capewell	Great Britain	33.010	+0.147	
3rd place, bronze medalist(s)	Katy Marchant	Great Britain	33.119	+0.256	
4	Emma Finucane	Great Britain	33.178	+0.315	
5	Martha Bayona	Colombia	33.211	+0.348	
6	Kristina Clonan	Australia	33.247	+0.384	
7	Miriam Vece	Italy	33.419	+0.556	
8	Jiang Yulu	China	33.779	+0.916	
