= 2021 UCI Road World Championships – Men's under-23 time trial =

Men's under-23 time trial
2021 UCI Road World Championships

Race details
- Dates: 20 September 2021
- Stages: 1
- Distance: 30.3 km (18.83 mi)
- Winning time: 34' 29"

Medalists
	Gold	(Denmark) Johan Price-Pejtersen (DEN)
	Silver	(Australia) Luke Plapp (AUS)
	Bronze	(Belgium) Florian Vermeersch (BEL)

The Men's under-23 time trial of the 2021 UCI Road World Championships was a cycling event that took place on 20 September 2021 from Knokke-Heist to Bruges, Belgium. It was the 25th edition of the event. The race was won by Danish rider Johan Price-Pejtersen, finishing ten seconds ahead of Luke Plapp of Australia.

== Final classification ==
68 riders from 43 nations entered the competition, of which one did not finish and oone did not start.

Rank	Rider	Country	Time
1	Johan Price-Pejtersen	Denmark	34' 29"
2	Luke Plapp	Australia	+ 10"
3	Florian Vermeersch	Belgium	+ 11"
4	Søren Wærenskjold	Norway	+ 13"
5	Mick van Dijke	Netherlands	+ 24"
6	Daan Hoole	Netherlands	+ 39"
7	Ethan Vernon	Great Britain	+ 43"
8	Michel Hessmann	Germany	+ 48"
9	Filippo Baroncini	Italy	+ 57"
10	Magnus Sheffield	United States	+ 58"
11	Logan Currie	New Zealand	+ 1' 00"
12	Fran Miholjević	Croatia	+ 1' 04"
13	Finn Fisher-Black	New Zealand	+ 1' 05"
14	Erik Fetter	Hungary	+ 1' 06"
15	Carter Turnbull	Australia	+ 1' 15"
16	Raúl García Pierna	Spain	+ 1' 17"
17	Tobias Bayer	Austria	+ 1' 19"
18	Adam Holm Jørgensen	Denmark	+ 1' 22"
19	Alexandre Balmer	Switzerland	+ 1' 24"
20	Yevgeniy Fedorov	Kazakhstan	+ 1' 25"
21	Xabier Azparren	Spain	+ 1' 25"
22	Jenno Berckmoes	Belgium	+ 1' 27"
23	Marcus Sander Hansen	Denmark	+ 1' 30"
24	Valère Thiébaud	Switzerland	+ 1' 31"
25	Kevin Vauquelin	France	+ 1' 36"
26	Rait Ärm	Estonia	+ 1' 41"
27	Filip Maciejuk	Poland	+ 1' 42"
28	Maurice Ballerstedt	Germany	+ 1' 50"
29	Joonas Kurits	Estonia	+ 1' 54"
30	Matthew Riccitello	United States	+ 1' 56"
31	Ben Healy	Ireland	+ 1' 59"
32	Raphael Parisella	Canada	+ 2' 00"
33	Marco Frigo	Italy	+ 2' 01"
34	Tomáš Kopecký	Czech Republic	+ 2' 02"
35	Nik Čemažar	Slovenia	+ 2' 02"
36	Daniel Årnes	Norway	+ 2' 04"
37	Igor Chzhan	Kazakhstan	+ 2' 11"
38	Santiago Buitrago	Colombia	+ 2' 12"
39	Kevin Mccambridge	Ireland	+ 2' 13"
40	Jason Oosthuizen	South Africa	+ 2' 13"
41	Arthur Kluckers	Luxembourg	+ 2' 17"
42	Andrei Stepanov	Russia	+ 2' 21"
43	Thomas Delphis	France	+ 2' 27"
44	Aivaras Mikutis	Lithuania	+ 2' 37"
45	Anže Skok	Slovenia	+ 2' 41"
46	Francis Juneau	Canada	+ 2' 45"
47	Victor Ocampo	Colombia	+ 2' 50"
48	Kaden Hopkins	Bermuda	+ 2' 51"
49	Paul Daumont	Burkina Faso	+ 3' 02"
50	Conor White	Bermuda	+ 3' 07"
51	Renus Byiza Uhiriwe	Rwanda	+ 3' 38"
52	Loïc Bettendorff	Luxembourg	+ 3' 32"
53	Daniil Nikulin	Ukraine	+ 3' 36"
54	Rokas Kmieliauskas	Lithuania	+ 3' 41"
55	José Eduardo Autran	Chile	+ 3' 50"
56	Hamza Mansouri	Algeria	+ 3' 52"
57	Jean Eric Habimana	Rwanda	+ 4' 07"
58	Aleksey Fomovskiy	Uzbekistan	+ 4' 22"
59	Jorge Peyrot Balvanera	Mexico	+ 4' 40"
60	Francisco Chipolini	Argentina	+ 5' 03"
61	Thanakhan Chaiyasombat	Thailand	+ 5' 06"
62	Roberto José Herrera	Panama	+ 5' 34"
63	Danil Evdokimov	Uzbekistan	+ 5' 37"
64	Negasi Haylu Abreha	Ethiopia	+ 6' 04"
65	Joel Morales	Argentina	+ 6' 45"
66	Mohamed Rayes	Syria	+ 9' 07"
	Alexandros Matsangos	Cyprus	DNF
	Henok Mulubrhan	Eritrea	DNS
