= 2024 UCI Track Cycling World Championships – Women's keirin =

Women's keirin at the 2024 UCI Track Cycling World Championships
- Venue: Ballerup Super Arena
- Location: Ballerup, Denmark
- Dates: 20 October
- Competitors: 24 from 18 nations

Medalists
gold medal	Mina Sato	Japan
silver medal	Hetty van de Wouw	Netherlands
bronze medal	Katy Marchant	Great Britain

The Women's keirin competition at the 2024 UCI Track Cycling World Championships was held on 20 October 2024.

== Results ==
=== First round ===
The first round was started at 11:08. The first two riders from each heat qualified for the quarterfinals, all other riders moved to the repechages.

Heat 1

Rank	Name	Nation	Gap	Notes
1	Martha Bayona	Colombia		Q
2	Fuko Umekawa	Japan	+0.033	Q
3	Nurul Izzah Izzati Mohd Asri	Malaysia	+0.094	
4	Kristina Clonan	Australia	+0.201	
5	Marlena Karwacka	Poland	+1.564	

Heat 3

Rank	Name	Nation	Gap	Notes
1	Hetty van de Wouw	Netherlands		Q
2	Veronika Jaborníková	Czech Republic	+0.298	Q
3	Wang Lijuan	China	+0.462	
4	Anis Amira Rosidi	Malaysia	+0.890	
–	Alessa-Catriona Pröpster	Germany	Did not finish	

Heat 5

Rank	Name	Nation	Gap	Notes
1	Katy Marchant	Great Britain		Q
2	Daniela Gaxiola	Mexico	+0.112	Q
3	Alla Biletska	Ukraine	+0.208	
4	Ng Sze Wing	Hong Kong	+1.008	
–	Molly McGill	Australia	Did not start	

Heat 2

Rank	Name	Nation	Gap	Notes
1	Emma Finucane	Great Britain		Q
2	Alessia McCaig	Australia	+0.235	Q
3	Steffie van der Peet	Netherlands	+0.444	
4	Clara Schneider	Germany	+0.520	
5	Miriam Vece	Italy	+1.725	

Heat 4

Rank	Name	Nation	Gap	Notes
1	Mathilde Gros	France		Q
2	Mina Sato	Japan	+0.019	Q
3	Helena Casas	Spain	+0.317	
4	Yeung Cho Yiu	Hong Kong	+0.332	
5	Urszula Łoś	Poland	+0.612	

=== First round repechage ===
The first round repechage was started at 11:49. The first two riders from each heat qualified for the quarterfinals.

Heat 1

Rank	Name	Nation	Gap	Notes
1	Nurul Izzah Izzati Mohd Asri	Malaysia		Q
2	Yeung Cho Yiu	Hong Kong	+0.126	Q
3	Urszula Łoś	Poland	+0.232	

Heat 3

Rank	Name	Nation	Gap	Notes
1	Clara Schneider	Germany		Q
2	Wang Lijuan	China	+0.046	Q
3	Marlena Karwacka	Poland	+0.154	
4	Ng Sze Wing	Hong Kong	+0.30	

Heat 2

Rank	Name	Nation	Gap	Notes
1	Kristina Clonan	Australia		Q
2	Steffie van der Peet	Netherlands	+0.018	Q
3	Anis Amira Rosidi	Malaysia	1.560	

Heat 4

Rank	Name	Nation	Gap	Notes
1	Alessa-Catriona Pröpster	Germany		Q
2	Miriam Vece	Italy	+0.014	Q
3	Alla Biletska	Ukraine	+0.150	
4	Helena Casas	Spain	+0.182	

=== Quarterfinals ===
The quarterfinals were started at 13:32. The first four riders from each heat qualified for the semifinals.

Heat 1

Rank	Name	Nation	Gap	Notes
1	Martha Bayona	Colombia		Q
2	Miriam Vece	Italy	+0.502	Q
3	Steffie van der Peet	Netherlands	+0.613	Q
4	Alessia McCaig	Australia	+0.676	Q
5	Mathilde Gros	France	+0.700	
6	Clara Schneider	Germany	+0.951	

Heat 3

Rank	Name	Nation	Gap	Notes
1	Katy Marchant	Great Britain		Q
2	Hetty van de Wouw	Netherlands	+0.175	Q
3	Mina Sato	Japan	+0.245	Q
4	Yeung Cho Yiu	Hong Kong	+0.396	Q
5	Kristina Clonan	Australia	+0.408	
6	Daniela Gaxiola	Mexico	+0.747	

Heat 2

Rank	Name	Nation	Gap	Notes
1	Emma Finucane	Great Britain		Q
2	Wang Lijuan	China	+0.073	Q
3	Nurul Izzah Izzati Mohd Asri	Malaysia	+0.076	Q
4	Fuko Umekawa	Japan	+0.156	Q
5	Veronika Jaborníková	Czech Republic	+0.356	
6	Alessa-Catriona Pröpster	Germany	+1.487	

=== Semifinals ===
The semifinals were started at 14:33. The first three riders in each heat qualified for the final, all other riders raced for places 7 to 12.

Heat 1

Rank	Name	Nation	Gap	Notes
1	Katy Marchant	Great Britain		Q
2	Steffie van der Peet	Netherlands	+0.039	Q
3	Mina Sato	Japan	+0.144	Q
4	Martha Bayona	Colombia	+0.144	
5	Wang Lijuan	China	+0.157	
6	Yeung Cho Yiu	Hong Kong	+2.226	

Heat 2

Rank	Name	Nation	Gap	Notes
1	Hetty van de Wouw	Netherlands		Q
2	Emma Finucane	Great Britain	+0.080	Q
3	Fuko Umekawa	Japan	+0.099	Q
4	Miriam Vece	Italy	+0.336	
5	Nurul Izzah Izzati Mohd Asri	Malaysia	+0.463	
6	Alessia McCaig	Australia	+0.612	

=== Finals ===
The finals were started at 14:33.

==== 7/12 final ====
Rank	Name	Nation	Gap	Notes
7	Nurul Izzah Izzati Mohd Asri	Malaysia		
8	Wang Lijuan	China		
9	Martha Bayona	Colombia	+0.201	
10	Miriam Vece	Italy	+0.093	
11	Alessia McCaig	Australia	+0.369	
12	Yeung Cho Yiu	Hong Kong	+0.455	

==== Final ====
Rank	Name	Nation	Gap	Notes
1st place, gold medalist(s)	Mina Sato	Japan		
2nd place, silver medalist(s)	Hetty van de Wouw	Netherlands	+0.102	
3rd place, bronze medalist(s)	Katy Marchant	Great Britain	+0.106	
4	Emma Finucane	Great Britain	+0.118	
5	Fuko Umekawa	Japan	+0.191	
6	Steffie van der Peet	Netherlands	+0.455	
