= Gary Sadler =

English cyclist

Personal information
- Nationality: England
- Born: 28 May 1962 (age 64) Kingswinford, Staffordshire
Medal record
Cycling
Representing England
Commonwealth Games
Bronze medal – third place	1982 Brisbane	team pursuit

Gary Sadler (born 1962), is a male retired cyclist who competed for England.

== Cycling career ==
He represented England in the 1 km time trial and won a bronze medal in the 4,000 metres team pursuit with Darryl Webster, Shaun Wallace, Tony Mayer and Paul Curran, at the 1982 Commonwealth Games in Brisbane, Queensland, Australia.

Sadler was a six times British track champion, winning the British National Individual Sprint Championships in 1988, the British National Individual Time Trial Championships in 1980 & 1982, the British National Team Pursuit Championships in 1980, the in British National Scratch Championships in 1982 and the British National Keirin Championships in 1988.
