= Johan Price-Pejtersen =

Danish cyclist

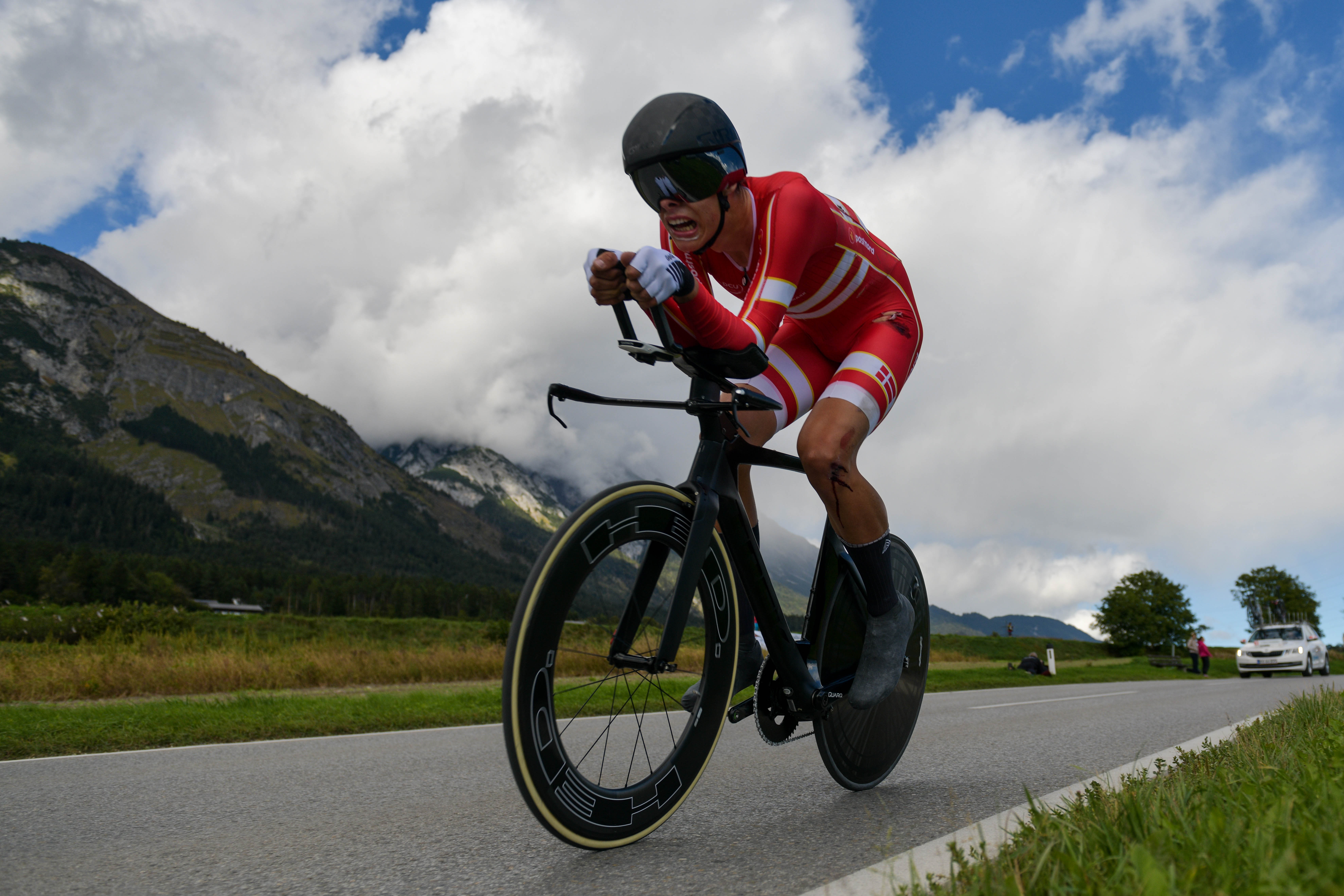
- Price-Pejtersen at the 2018 UCI Road World Championships

Personal information
- Full name: Johan Price-Pejtersen
- Born: 26 May 1999 (age 27) Frederiksberg, Denmark
- Height: 1.91 m (6 ft 3 in)
- Weight: 83 kg (183 lb)

Cycling career
- Sport: Cycling
- Current team: Alpecin–Premier Tech
- Discipline: Road
- Role: Rider
- Rider type: Time trialist

Professional teams
- 2018–2020: Team ColoQuick
- 2020–2021: Uno-X Pro Cycling Team
- 2022–2024: Team Bahrain Victorious
- 2025–: Alpecin–Deceuninck
Medal record
Representing Denmark
Men's track cycling
UCI Junior Track World Championships
Gold medal – first place	2017 Montichiari	Individual pursuit
Silver medal – second place	2017 Montichiari	Team pursuit
Men's road bicycle racing
World Championships
Gold medal – first place	2021 Brugge	Under-23 time trial
European Championships
Gold medal – first place	2019 Alkmaar	Under-23 time trial
Gold medal – first place	2021 Trentino	Under-23 time trial

Johan Price-Pejtersen (born 26 May 1999) is a Danish cyclist, who currently rides for UCI WorldTeam Alpecin–Premier Tech. He is a time trial specialist and won the Danish time trial championship in 2024.

== Major results ==
=== Road ===
2018
1st Stage 5b (ITT) Olympia's Tour
3rd Hafjell GP
2019
1st Time trial, UEC European Under-23 Championships
1st Time trial, National Under-23 Championships
2nd Hafjell GP
3rd Time trial, National Championships
2020
2nd Time trial, National Under-23 Championships
2021
1st Time trial, UCI World Under-23 Championships
1st Time trial, UEC European Under-23 Championships
1st Time trial, National Under-23 Championships
8th Overall L'Étoile d'Or
2024
1st Time trial, National Championships
3rd Chrono des Nations
2025
5th Time trial, National Championships

=== Track ===
2016
1st Team pursuit, National Championships
2017
UCI World Junior Championships

1st Individual pursuit
2nd Team pursuit

=== Grand Tour general classification results timeline ===
Grand Tour	2026
Giro d'Italia	140
Tour de France	
Vuelta a España	

Legend
—	Did not compete
DNF	Did not finish
IP	Race in Progress
