= 2024 UEC European Track Championships – Women's 500 m time trial =

Women's 500 m time trial at the 2024 UEC European Track Championships
- Venue: Omnisport Apeldoorn, Apeldoorn
- Date: 13 January
- Competitors: 18 from 9 nations
- Winning time: 33.319

Medalists
| gold medal | Katy Marchant | Great Britain |
| silver medal | Taky Marie-Divine Kouamé | France |
| bronze medal | Pauline Grabosch | Germany |

The women's 500 m time trial competition at the 2024 UEC European Track Championships was held on 13 January 2024.

== Results ==
=== Qualifying ===
The top 8 riders qualified for the final.

| Rank | Name | Nation | Time | Behind | Notes |
|---|---|---|---|---|---|
| 1 | Katy Marchant | Great Britain | 33.252 | | Q |
| 2 | Pauline Grabosch | Germany | 33.373 | +0.121 | Q |
| 3 | Miriam Vece | Italy | 33.411 | +0.159 | Q |
| 4 | Taky Marie-Divine Kouamé | France | 33.554 | +0.302 | Q |
| 5 | Marlena Karwacka | Poland | 33.592 | +0.340 | Q |
| 6 | Lowri Thomas | Great Britain | 33.939 | +0.687 | Q |
| 7 | Clara Schneider | Germany | 34.466 | +1.214 | Q |
| 8 | Paulina Petri | Poland | 34.513 | +1.261 | Q |
| 9 | Kyra Lamberink | Netherlands | 34.545 | +1.293 | |
| 10 | Julie Nicolaes | Belgium | 34.757 | +1.505 | |
| 11 | Kimberly Kalee | Netherlands | 34.843 | +1.591 | |
| 12 | Valerie Jenaer | Belgium | 34.871 | +1.619 | |
| 13 | Oleksandra Lohviniuk | Ukraine | 34.910 | +1.658 | |
| 14 | Natálie Mikšaníková | Czech Republic | 34.928 | +1.676 | |
| 15 | Alla Biletska | Ukraine | 34.960 | +1.708 | |
| 16 | Julie Michaux | France | 35.086 | +1.834 | |
| 17 | Anna Jaborníková | Czech Republic | 35.539 | +2.287 | |
| 18 | Martina Fidanza | Italy | 35.661 | +2.409 | |

=== Final ===
| Rank | Name | Nation | Time | Behind | Notes |
|---|---|---|---|---|---|
| 1st place, gold medalist(s) | Katy Marchant | Great Britain | 33.319 | | |
| 2nd place, silver medalist(s) | Taky Marie-Divine Kouamé | France | 33.356 | +0.037 | |
| 3rd place, bronze medalist(s) | Pauline Grabosch | Germany | 33.444 | +0.125 | |
| 4 | Miriam Vece | Italy | 33.513 | +0.194 | |
| 5 | Marlena Karwacka | Poland | 33.678 | +0.359 | |
| 6 | Lowri Thomas | Great Britain | 34.026 | +0.707 | |
| 7 | Paulina Petri | Poland | 34.396 | +1.077 | |
| 8 | Clara Schneider | Germany | 34.682 | +1.363 | |
