= Nicole Shields =

New Zealand cyclist (born 1999)

Personal information
- Born: 9 September 1999 (age 27) Invercargill, New Zealand
- Height: 175 cm (5 ft 9 in)

Cycling career
- Sport: Cycling
- Disciplines: Road, Track
- Role: Rider

Professional team
- 2020–2022: DNA Pro Cycling
Medal record
Women's track cycling
Representing New Zealand
Olympic Games
Silver medal – second place	2024 Paris	Team pursuit
Junior World Championships
Silver medal – second place	2017 Montichiari	Team pursuit
Silver medal – second place	2016 Aigle	Team pursuit

Nicole Shields (born 9 September 1999) is a New Zealand road and track cyclist. She competed at the 2024 Paris Olympics, winning silver in the team pursuit (alongside Ally Wollaston, Bryony Botha, and Emily Shearman).

== Early life ==
She grew up in Clyde, New Zealand and attended Dunstan High School in Central Otago. Shields was a member of the under-17 New Zealand development squad. In April 2015, she became the first female cyclist in 20 years to win two consecutive time trials and road races at the New Zealand club national championships.

== Career ==
She was a member of the New Zealand 4000m pursuit teams that won silvers at the 2016 UCI Junior Track Cycling World Championships in Switzerland and the 2017 UCI Junior Track Cycling World Championships in Italy.

Shields won both the New Zealand's Individual Pursuit Track Nationals and the Team Pursuit at the Oceania Championships at U19 level. She signed for the cycling team DNA Pro Cycling in October 2019. That year, she was part of the New Zealand team which won the 4000m women's team pursuit at the third round of the UCI Cycling Track World Cup in Hong Kong in 2019. At the World Cup she also partnered with Jessie Hodges to be runners-up in the madison event.

She rode with the New Zealand team pursuit that set a New Zealand all-comers record at the UCI Oceania Track Cycling Championships in Cambridge, New Zealand in February 2024. She was part of the New Zealand team pursuit that won the UCI Nations Cup event in Hong Kong in March 2024.

She was selected to represent New Zealand at the 2024 Summer Olympics in Paris.
