= Steve Cronshaw =

English track cyclist

Personal information
- Born: 1956 (age 69–70) Lancashire

Cycling career
- Sport: Cycling
- Discipline: Track cycling
- Role: Rider

Amateur team
- 1977–79: VC Europa

Steve Cronshaw (born 1956) is an English male former track cyclist and current coach.

== Cycling career ==
Cronshaw was a four times British track champion after winning the British National Individual Sprint Championships in 1979 and three Tandem titles from 1977 to 1979.
