= Ellie Coster =

Welsh cyclist

Personal information
- Full name: Eleanor Victoria Coster
- Born: 31 January 1996 (age 30) Newport, Wales
- Height: 166 cm (5 ft 5 in)
- Weight: 65 kg (143 lb)

Cycling career
- Sport: Cycling
- Current team: Team Wales
- Disciplines: Sprint, Keirin
- Role: Rider
- Rider type: Sprinter

Eleanor Victoria Coster (born 31 January 1996) is a Welsh female track cyclist.

== Cycling career ==
Coster became a British champion after winning the time trial Championship at the 2019 British National Track Championships

She also represented Wales at the 2018 Commonwealth Games and the 2022 Commonwealth Games.
