= John Archibald (cyclist) =

Scottish cyclist

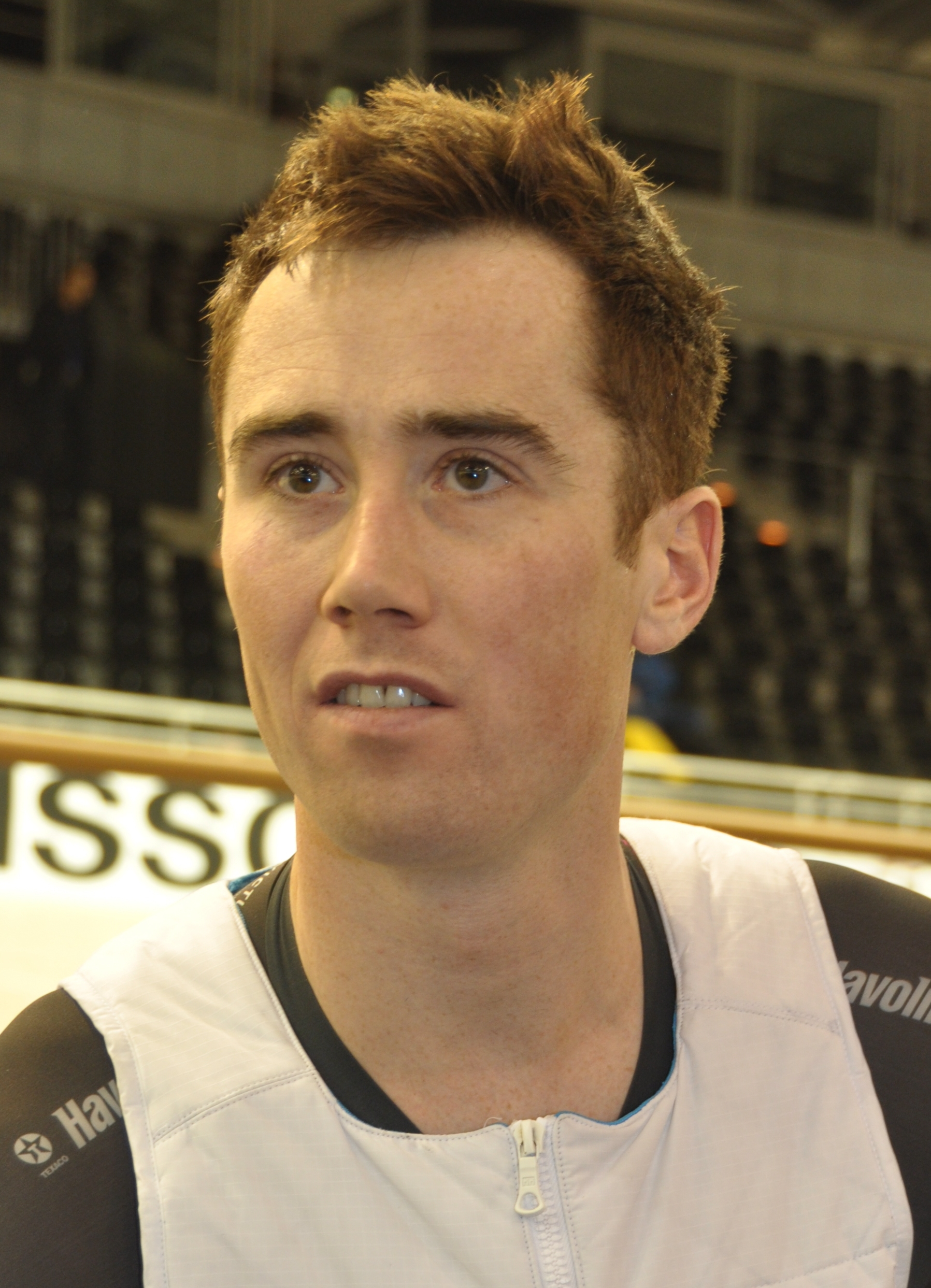
- Archibald in 2018

Personal information
- Full name: John Archibald
- Born: 14 November 1990 (age 35) Edinburgh, Scotland

Cycling career
- Sport: Cycling
- Disciplines: Road; Track
- Role: Rider

Amateur teams
- 2016–2017: Pro Vision Scotland
- 2018: Ribble Pro Cycling

Professional teams
- 2019–2020: Ribble Pro Cycling
- 2021: Eolo–Kometa
Medal record
Representing Great Britain
Men's road bicycle racing
World Championships
Bronze medal – third place	2019 Yorkshire	Team time trial mixed relay
Representing Scotland
Men's track cycling
Commonwealth Games
Silver medal – second place	2018 Gold Coast	Individual pursuit
Silver medal – second place	2022 Birmingham	Scratch race

John Archibald (born 14 November 1990) is a Scottish racing cyclist, Commonwealth Games medallist, former professional and time-trial record holder.

== Career ==
He competed in the men's individual pursuit event at the 2018 Commonwealth Games. He reached the final, winning the silver medal. Archibald became a double British champion after winning the British National Individual Pursuit Championships at the British National Track Championships in 2019 and 2020.

He rode professionally for UCI ProTeam Ribble Weldtite and Team Polti VisitMalta.

In 2023, he joined a digital marketing and web design agency as a Digital Marketing Account Manager.

He broke the 100 mile time-trial record in 2024 and the 50 mile time-trial record in 2025.

In 2025 he paired with Chris McDonald, a visually impaired cyclist, as a tandem pilot.

== Personal life ==
He is the brother of Scottish cyclist Katie Archibald, and cousin of Leyton Orient player Theo Archibald.

== Major results ==
=== Road ===
2018
4th Time trial, National Championships
2019
National Championships

2nd Time trial
3rd Road race

3rd Team relay, UCI World Championships
2021
5th Time trial, National Championships
2022
4th Time trial, National Championships
6th Time trial, Commonwealth Games

=== Track ===
2018
UCI World Cup

1st Team pursuit, London
2nd Team pursuit, Milton

National Championships

1st Points race
3rd Individual pursuit
3rd Team pursuit

2nd Individual pursuit, Commonwealth Games
2019
National Championships

1st Individual pursuit
1st Team pursuit

2020
National Championships

1st Individual pursuit
1st Team pursuit

2022
2nd Scratch, Commonwealth Games
3rd Points race, National Championships
