= Rhys Britton =

British road and track cyclist

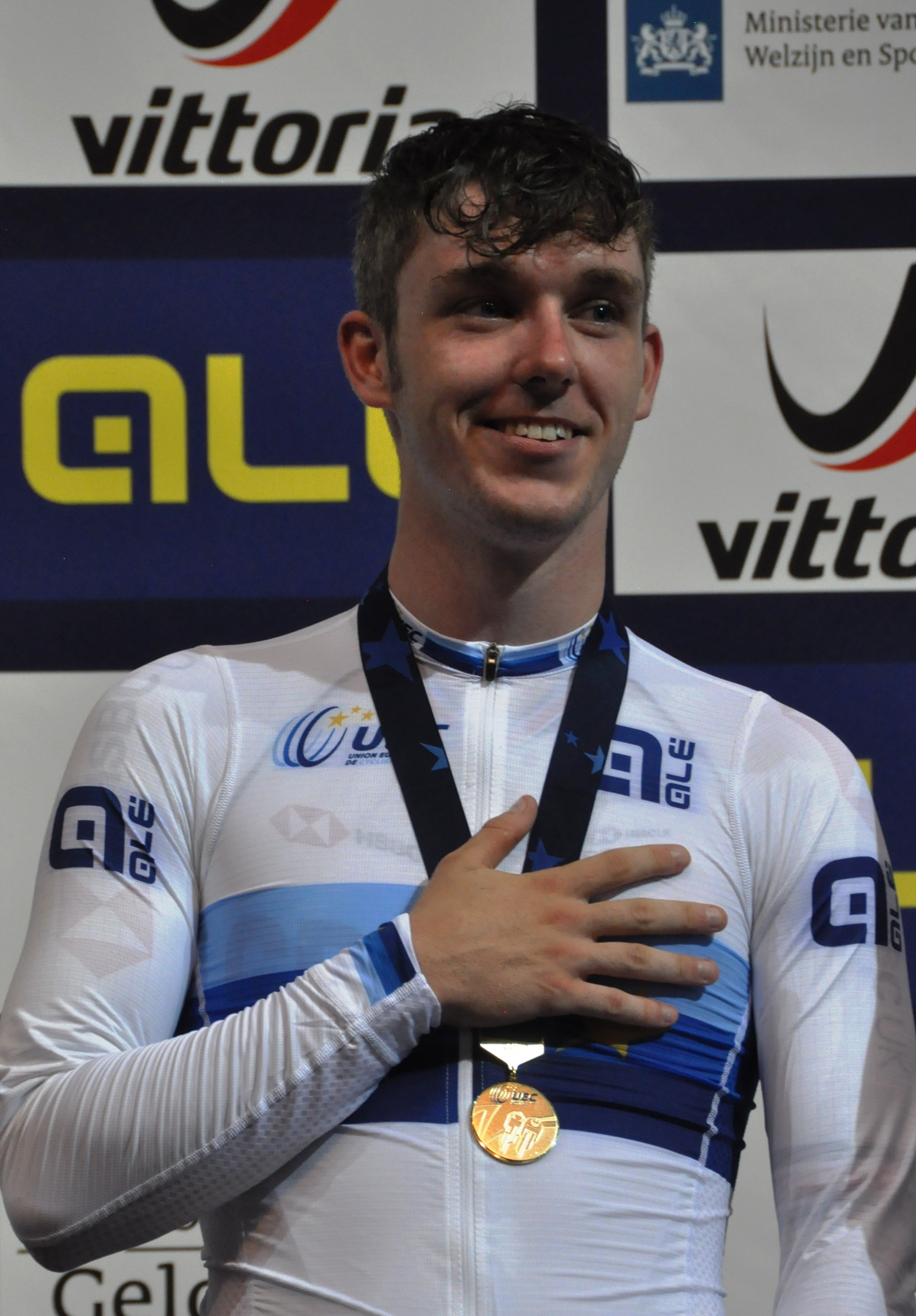
- Britton at the 2021 UEC European Under-23 Track Championships

Personal information
- Born: 13 May 1999 (age 27) Pontypridd, Wales
- Height: 1.72 m (5 ft 8 in)
- Weight: 69 kg (152 lb)

Cycling career
- Sport: Cycling
- Current team: Dolan Factory Racing
- Disciplines: Track; Road
- Role: Rider

Amateur teams
- 2018: 100% Me
- 2019: Wales Racing Academy
- 2019–2020: Team Inspired
- 2021: GB Cycling Senior Academy
- 2024: Uskis Saint Piran Development Team
- 2025–: Dolan Factory Racing

Professional teams
- 2022: EvoPro Racing
- 2023: Saint Piran
- 2024: Saint Piran
Medal record
Men's track cycling
Representing Great Britain
World Championships
Silver medal – second place	2024 Ballerup	Team pursuit
Bronze medal – third place	2021 Roubaix	Scratch
European Championships
Silver medal – second place	2025 Heusden-Zolder	Team pursuit
Bronze medal – third place	2021 Grenchen	Team pursuit
Bronze medal – third place	2022 Munich	Team pursuit

Rhys Britton (born 13 May 1999) is a British road and track cyclist, who rides for British amateur team Dolan Factory Racing.

On the track, Britton has won two medals at the UCI Track Cycling World Championships in 2021 and 2024, three team pursuit medals at the UEC European Track Championships between 2021 and 2025, and has won seven national titles at the British Cycling National Track Championships between 2018 and 2023. He has also represented Wales at the Commonwealth Games on two occasions, in 2018 and 2022.

== Major results ==
=== Road ===
2017
1st Points classification, Junior Tour of Wales
7th Overall Driedaagse van Axel

1st Stage 3

9th Kuurne–Brussels–Kuurne Juniores

=== Track ===
2016
1st Madison, UEC European Junior Championships (with Matt Walls)
2017
1st Madison, National Junior Championships (with Jake Stewart)
UEC European Junior Championships

2nd Team pursuit
3rd Individual pursuit
3rd Madison (with Jake Stewart)

3rd Team pursuit, UCI World Junior Championships
2018
National Championships

1st Team pursuit
2nd Madison (with Ethan Vernon)
2nd Points race
2nd Scratch

2019
National Championships

1st Madison (with Fred Wright)
1st Points race
2nd Team pursuit
3rd Omnium

2020
National Championships

1st Points race
1st Scratch
2nd Team pursuit

2021
UEC European Under-23 Championships

1st Madison (with William Tidball)
2nd Team pursuit

UCI Champions League

2nd Scratch, Panevėžys
3rd Scratch, Mallorca

3rd Scratch, UCI World Championships
3rd Team pursuit, UEC European Championships
2022
1st Team pursuit, National Championships
UCI Nations Cup

1st Scratch, Milton
2nd Madison, Milton (with Ethan Hayter)
2nd Team pursuit, Glasgow

3rd Team pursuit, UEC European Championships
2023
1st Omnium, National Championships
3rd Team pursuit, UCI Nations Cup, Jakarta
2024
1st Team pursuit, UCI Nations Cup, Adelaide
2nd Team pursuit, UCI World Championships
2025
2nd Team pursuit, UEC European Championships
