= Jessica Crampton =

British cyclist

Personal information
- Born: 18 April 1994 (age 32) Manchester, England

Cycling career
- Sport: Cycling
- Current team: Sportcity Velo
- Discipline: Track Sprint
- Role: Rider
- Rider type: Sprinter

Jessica Crampton (born 1994) is a British female track cyclist.

== Cycling career ==
Crampton became a three times British champion after successfully defending her Kerin Championship at the 2019 British National Track Championships. She had previously won a sprint title in 2017.

== Family ==
She is the younger sister of Matthew Crampton.
