= Georgia Hilleard =

British cyclist

Personal information
- Born: 25 August 1999 (age 27) Wolverhampton, West Midlands

Cycling career
- Sport: Cycling
- Current team: Wolverhampton Wheelers
- Discipline: Track cycling
- Role: Rider
- Rider type: Keirin, sprint, time trial

Georgia Hilleard (born 1999) is a female British international track cyclist.

== Cycling career ==
Hilleard became a British team champion after winning the team sprint Championship at the 2018 British National Track Championships with Lauren Bate.
