= Jonathan Wale =

Scottish track cyclist (born 1991)

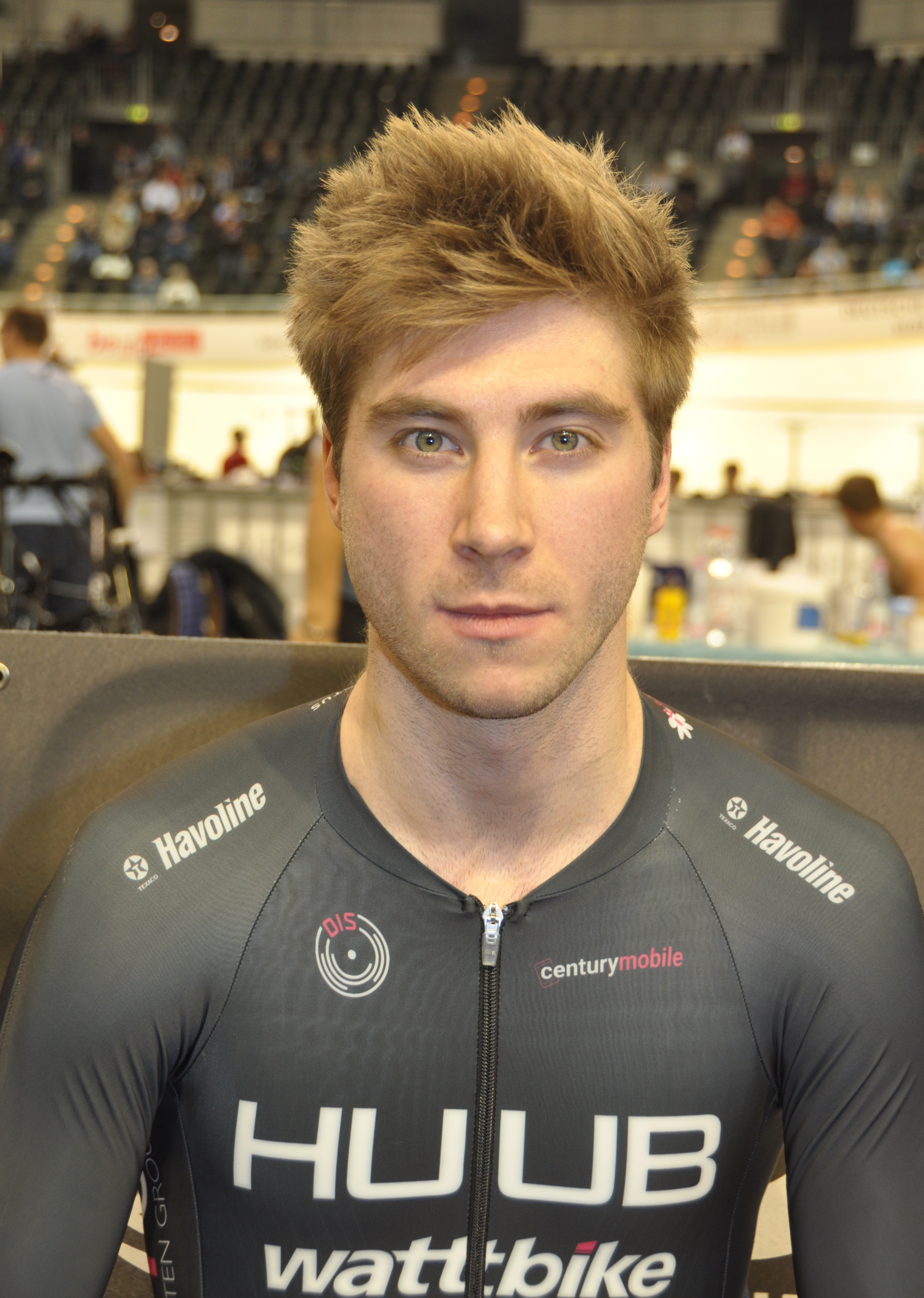
- Wale in 2018

Personal information
- Born: 15 June 1991 (age 35) Edinburgh, Scotland
- Height: 184 cm (6 ft 0 in)
- Weight: 82 kg (181 lb)

Cycling career
- Sport: Cycling
- Current team: HUUB-Wattbike Test Team
- Discipline: Track Sprint
- Role: Rider
- Rider type: Sprinter

Jonathan Wale (born 1991) is a Scottish track cyclist.

== Cycling career ==
Wale represented Scotland at the 2018 Commonwealth Games.

He became British champion when winning the time trial Championship at the 2020 British National Track Championships. He had finished third in 2019. At the 2022 British National Track Championships in Newport, Wales he won the silver medal in the time trial.
