= Lauren Bate =

English cyclist

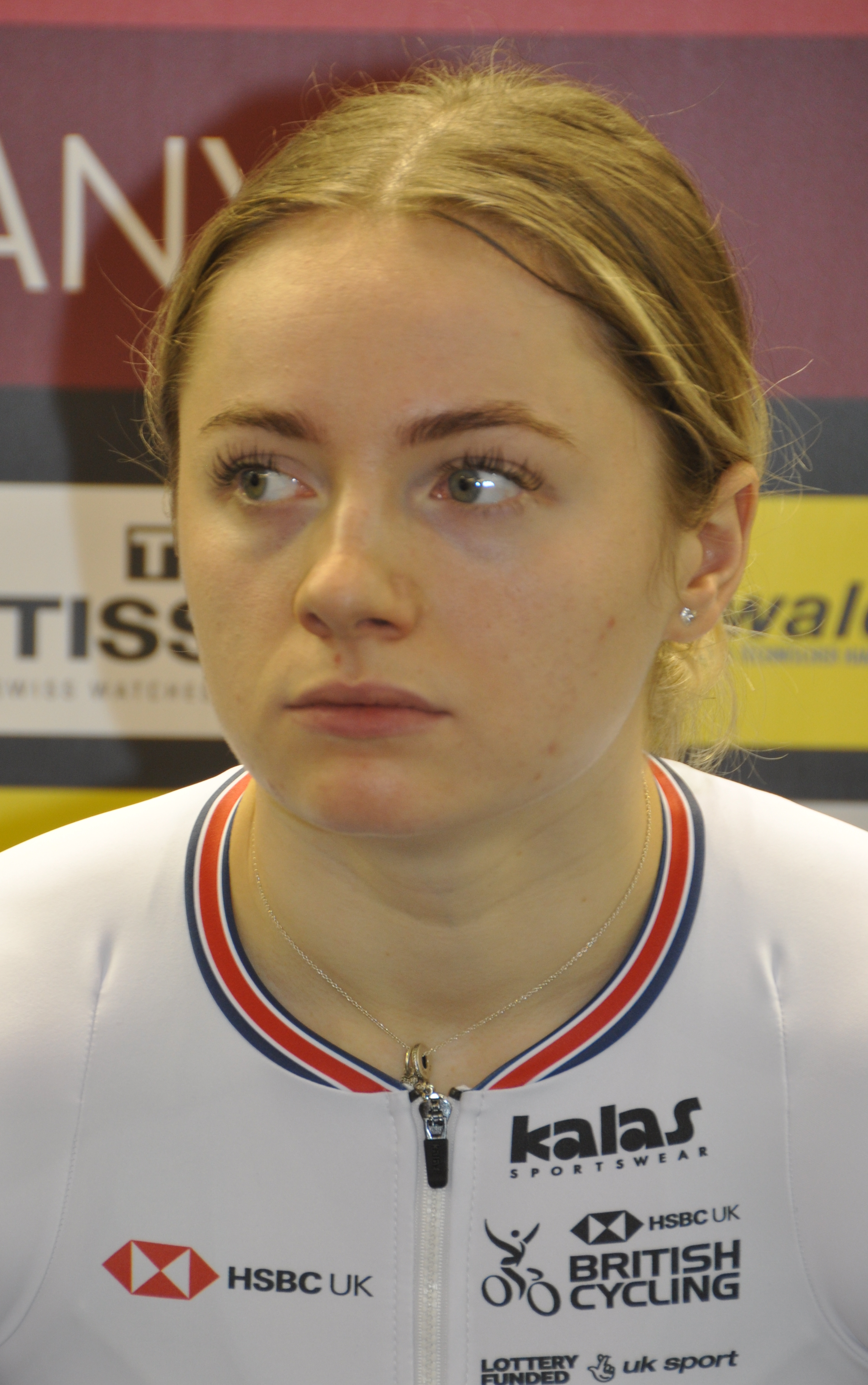
- Bate in 2018

Personal information
- Born: 24 October 1999 (age 26) Billinge, England
- Height: 1.56 m (5 ft 1 in)
- Weight: 63 kg (139 lb)

Cycling career
- Sport: Cycling
- Discipline: Track
- Role: Rider
Medal record
Women's track cycling
Representing Great Britain
World Championships
Bronze medal – third place	2021 Roubaix	Team sprint
European Championships
Silver medal – second place	2020 Plovdiv	Team sprint
Junior World Championships
Silver medal – second place	2017 Montichiari	Sprint
Bronze medal – third place	2017 Montichiari	Team sprint
U23 & Junior European Championships
Bronze medal – third place	2017 Sangalhos	Junior 500m time trial
Bronze medal – third place	2017 Sangalhos	Junior Keirin
Bronze medal – third place	2017 Sangalhos	Junior Team sprint
Representing England
Commonwealth Games
Bronze medal – third place	2018 Gold Coast	Team sprint

Lauren Bate (born 24 October 1999) is a former racing cyclist.

She rode in the women's team sprint event at the 2018 UCI Track Cycling World Championships and went on to win bronze in the event in 2021. At the 2018 Commonwealth Games, she won bronze in the team sprint event.

Bate became British champion when winning the Sprint Championship at the 2020 British National Track Championships. It was her first individual title having won the team sprint in 2017 and 2018.

She announced her retirement on 18 August 2023, aged 23.
