= Luca Giaimi =

Italian cyclist

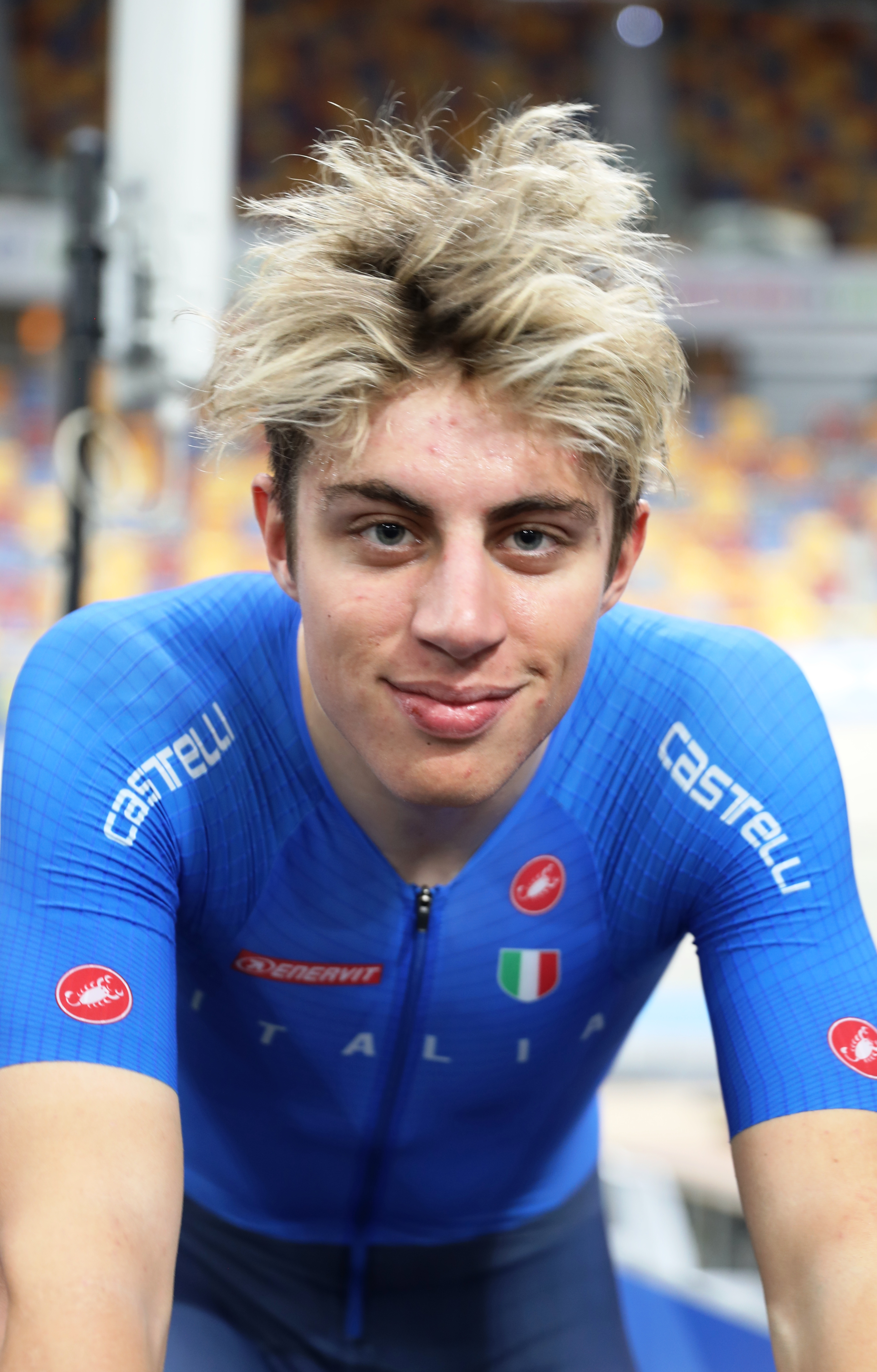
- Giaimi in 2024

Personal information
- Born: 12 January 2005 (age 21) Pietra Ligure, Italy
- Height: 1.83 m (6 ft 0 in)

Cycling career
- Sport: Cycling
- Current team: UAE Team Emirates XRG
- Disciplines: Road; Track
- Role: Rider

Amateur team
- 2022–2023: Team F.lli Giorgi ASD

Professional teams
- 2024–2026: UAE Team Emirates Gen Z
- 2026–: UAE Team Emirates XRG
Medal record
Representing Italy
Men's road bicycle racing
European Championships
Gold medal – first place	2023 Drenthe	Junior team relay
Men's track cycling
European Under-23 Championships
Gold medal – first place	2024 Cottbus	Team pursuit
Bronze medal – third place	2025 Anadia	Individual pursuit
Bronze medal – third place	2025 Anadia	Team pursuit
World Junior Championships
Gold medal – first place	2022 Tel Aviv	Team pursuit
Gold medal – first place	2023 Cali	Team pursuit
Silver medal – second place	2023 Cali	Individual pursuit
European Junior Championships
Gold medal – first place	2022 Anadia	Individual pursuit
Gold medal – first place	2023 Anadia	Individual pursuit
Gold medal – first place	2022 Anadia	Team pursuit
Gold medal – first place	2023 Anadia	Team pursuit

Luca Giaimi (born 12 January 2005) is an Italian professional cyclist who rides for UCI WorldTeam UAE Team Emirates XRG.

== Career ==
After joining UAE Team Emirates Gen Z in 2024, Giami was promoted to the World Tour in February 2026.

== Major results ==
=== Road ===
2022
1st Piccola Tre Valli Varesine
2023
1st Time trial, National Junior Championships
UEC European Junior Championships

1st Team relay
5th Time trial

1st Stage 3 Watersley Junior Challenge
1st Stage 1a (TTT) Eroica Juniores – Nations' Cup
6th Time trial, UCI Junior Road World Championships
7th Overall Trophée Centre Morbihan
2024
2nd Chrono des Nations Under-23
4th GP Kranj
6th Gran Premio Industrie del Marmo
2025
1st Classica da Arrábida
1st Stage 5 Volta ao Alentejo
3rd Time trial, National Under-23 Championships
2026
2nd Time trial, National Championships
