= William Salter (cyclist) =

British cyclist (born 2006)

Personal information
- Born: 13 August 2006 (age 20) Yeovil, England

Cycling career
- Sport: Cycling
- Current team: Alpecin–Deceuninck Development Team
- Disciplines: Track; Road
- Role: Rider

Amateur team
- 2026-: Alpecin–Deceuninck Development Team
Medal record
Men's track cycling
Representing Great Britain
European Under-23 Championships
Gold medal – first place	2025 Anadia	Team pursuit
European Junior Championships
Gold medal – first place	2024 Cottbus	Omnium

William Salter (born 13 August 2006) is a British track and road cyclist. He rides for the Alpecin–Premier Tech Development Team.

== Career ==
From Yeovil, Salter won the gold medal in the omnium at the 2024 European Junior Championships.

Qualifying for Wales through his father, he was part is the Welsh quartet alongside Sam Fisher, Finlay Tarling, and Will Roberts that won the team pursuit title at the 2024 British Cycling National Track Championships. He was selected to represent Great Britain at the 2024 UCI Junior Track Cycling World Championships in China.

Salter was a gold medalist in the team pursuit in the 2025 European U23 Championships. Salter joined the Alpecin–Premier Tech Development Team following advice from British cycling coach Bryan Steel, and competed on the roads in Europe for the first time in 2026. Salter was selected to ride for Wales at the 2026 Commonwealth Games. Competing at the Games he was part of the Wales team that qualified for the bronze race against New Zealand in the team pursuit, placing fourth overall.

== Personal life ==
Born in England, Salter is of Welsh descent through his paternal grandparents.
