= Finlay Tarling =

Welsh cyclist (2006–2026)

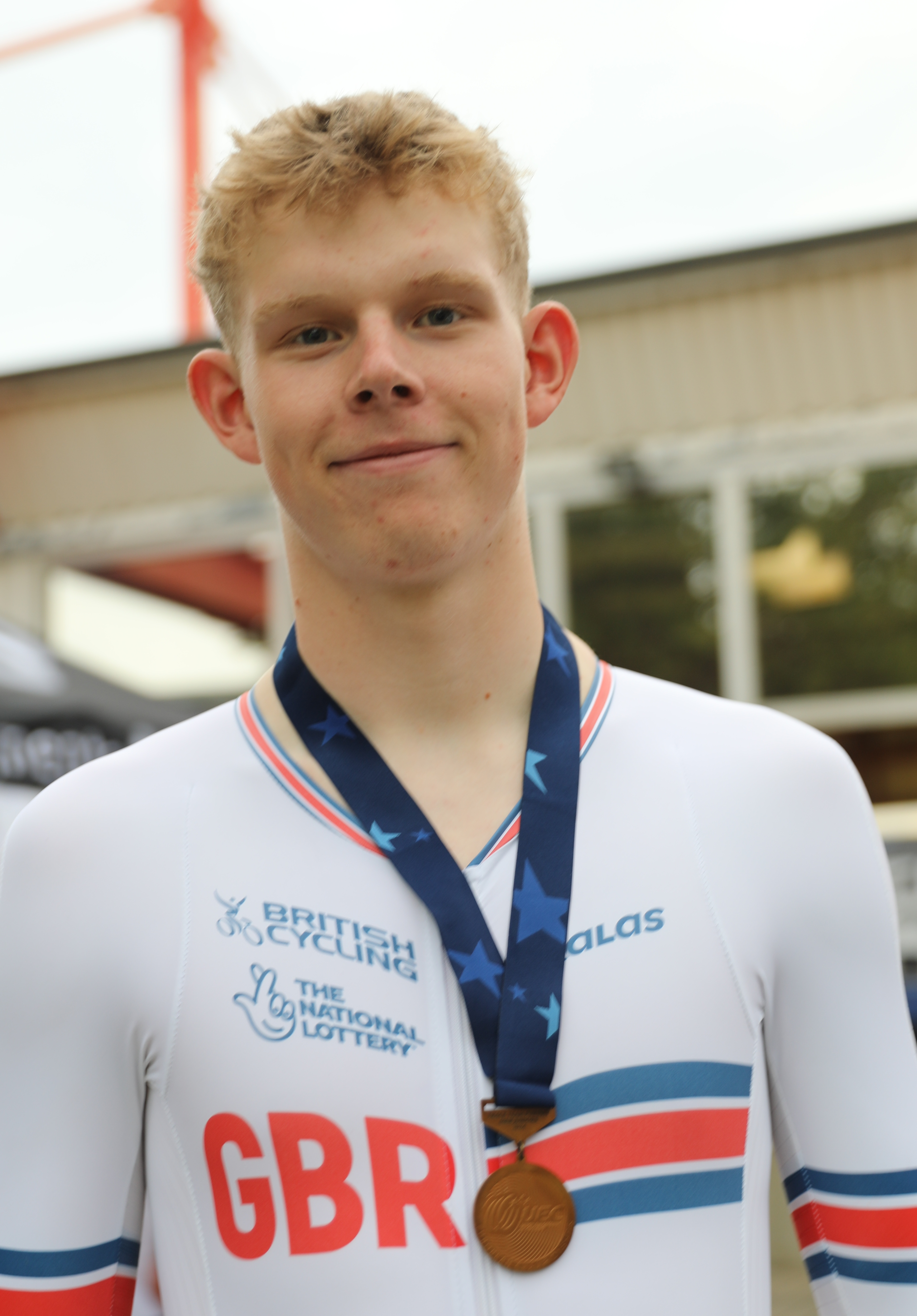
- Tarling in 2024

Personal information
- Full name: Finlay Luke Tarling
- Nickname: Fin
- Born: 2 October 2006 Gloucestershire, England
- Died: 14 August 2026 (aged 19) Ponte de Lima, Portugal
- Height: 1.86 m (6 ft 1 in)

Cycling career
- Sport: Cycling
- Current team: NSN Development Team
- Disciplines: Track; Road
- Role: Rider

Amateur team
- 2023–2024: Willebrord Wil Vooruit

Professional team
- 2025–2026: NSN Development Team

Finlay Luke Tarling (2 October 2006 – 14 August 2026) was a Welsh track and road cyclist who rode for the UCI Continental team NSN Development Team. He was the younger brother of Welsh track and road cyclist Josh Tarling.

In 2023, Tarling won silver medals in the team pursuit at the Junior European Track Championships, and in the Junior Chrono des Nations. In 2024, he won a gold medal with Team Wales in the team pursuit at the 2024 British Cycling National Track Championships, a silver medal in the British national junior time trial championship, and bronze medals in the junior team pursuit at the 2024 UEC European Track Championships (under-23 & junior) and in each of the men's points race, the men's Madison relay race, and the team pursuit (with a new national record) at the 2024 UCI Junior Track Cycling World Championships.

Tarling died, aged 19, following a collision with a motor vehicle during the eighth stage of the 2026 Volta a Portugal.

== Cycling career ==
=== Beginnings ===
In June 2019, at 12 years of age, Tarling (riding for West Wales Cycle Racing Team) won the Hammer Series event in Sittard, in the Netherlands, at the Tom Dumoulin Bike Park against 80 riders, all 12 or 13 years of age. At the 2019 Welsh Cyclo-cross Championships at the Gilwern Outdoor Education Centre in December, Tarling (riding for WORX Factory Racing) won the under-14 boys.

In September 2020, he won the RTTC 13-year-old 25-mile time trial national championship, riding for WORX Factory Racing Powered by Silverstone. In July 2021, Tarling won the silver medal in the British National Circuit Time Trial Championships held in Naseby, Northamptonshire.

In 2022, Tarling joined elder brother Joshua on the Belgian FlandersColor cycling team. He won his first five races in a row, including the Welsh Cyclocross Championships at Pembrey, Carmarthenshire, Wales, where he won the U16 race to become Welsh Champion.

=== Junior career ===
In July 2023, he won a silver medal in the team pursuit at the Junior European Track Championships in Anadia, Portugal. He rode that year for Dutch team Willebrord Wil Vooruit (WWV). In October 2023 he finished runner-up in the 27.23-kilometer Junior Chrono des Nations in Les Herbiers, Vendée, France, finishing one second behind the champion. He said: "Time trials have to be my favorite discipline, but I also like to attack."

With Team Wales he won a gold medal in the team pursuit at the 2024 British Cycling National Track Championships at the Manchester Velodrome in Manchester in February 2024. In June 2024, he was runner-up in the 30-kilometer British national junior time trial championship, and won a bronze medal in the 121-kilometer British national junior time road race.

Tarling won a bronze medal in the junior team pursuit at the 2024 UEC European Track Championships (under-23 & junior) at the Lausitz Velodrome in Cottbus, Germany, in July 2024. He set a record (46.14) in the Ross-On-Wye & Dist CC 25-mile time trial at Monmouth, Wales, in July 2024, against 77 competitors.

He won bronze medals in each of the men's points race, the men's Madison relay race, and the team pursuit (with a new national record) at the 2024 UCI Junior Track Cycling World Championships in Luoyang, China, in August 2024. He was sick with an upset stomach for the Road World Junior Championship time trial in Zurich, Switzerland, in September 2024, and placed 24th overall out of 66 riders.

=== NSN Development Team ===
Tarling signed a two-year contract to ride for Sylvan Adams's Israel-Premier Tech Academy team from the 2025 season. Academy Manager Tim Elverson said: “Time trialling is his passion; it’s also an area in which the team is really keen to improve. He’s also got an eye on Classics racing, and that’s a big area in which we can work together.” Tarling said: "I think as it’s my first year the races that I could best fit into would be the classic-type races .... I also think with TT background that I have that it could be used for shorter stage races with TTs to carry a possible GC contention." His first race was the Tour of Britain. In 2026, the team was renamed NSN Development.

== Personal life ==
Finlay Luke Tarling was born Gloucestershire, England on 2 October 2006, but was brought up in Ffos-y-ffin, Ceredigion, west Wales. He was the younger brother of Olympic track and road cyclist Josh Tarling, and his father is Michael Tarling, a keen cyclist who used to race at Newport Velodrome. In 2012, Tarling's parents started the West Wales Cycle Racing Team, in part to address the lack of cycling clubs in the area.

== Death ==
On 14 August 2026, while competing in the 2026 Volta a Portugal, Tarling, aged 19, was killed in a collision in Arcozelo, Ponte de Lima during the eighth stage of the race. The incident, which involved a light goods vehicle outside the race convoy that entered via a secondary road which was not blocked by warning tape or GNR officers, occurred on the route from Melgaço to Fafe. Following his death, the NSN Development team left the tour. The mens' cyclist union, Cyclistes Professionnels Associés, criticised the road safety measures in the race; unlike other races, the Volta a Portugal attempts to secure the road only in the vicinity of the moving convoy rather than over the entire route.

== Major results ==
2023
1st Stage 1 Isle of Man Youth & Junior Tour
2nd Chrono des Nations Juniors
7th Cadence Junior Road Race
2024
National Junior Road Championships

2nd Time trial
3rd Road race

2nd Overall 360cycling Junior Tour of North West

1st Stage 3 (ITT)

3rd Overall Fenwick's Tour of the Mendips
5th CAMS Yorkshire Classic
8th Overall Trophée Centre Morbihan
2026
3rd Time trial, National Under-23 Road Championships
