= Wil Holmes =

Australian cyclist (born 2006)

William Holmes
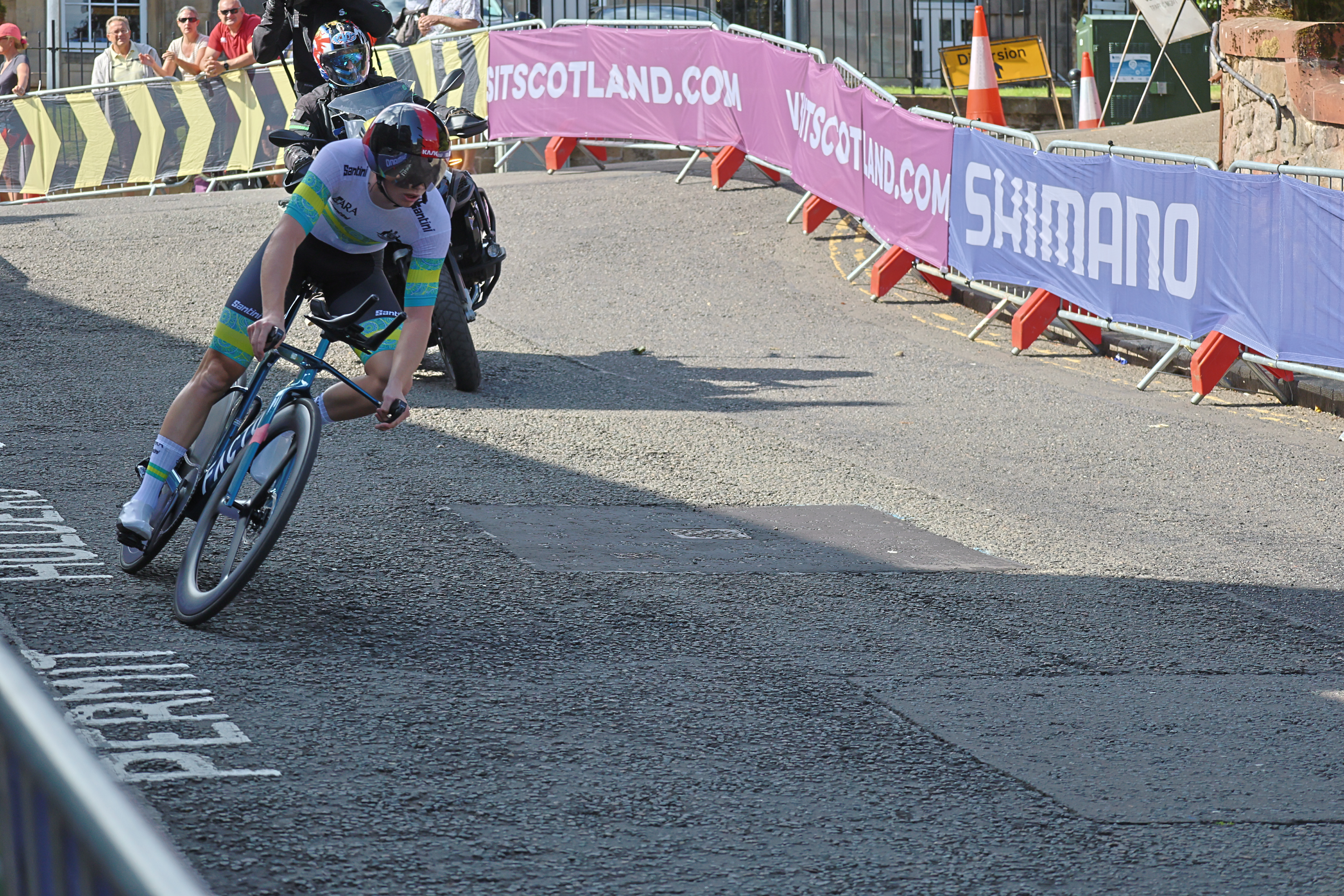
- Holmes at the 2023 UCI Road World Championships

Personal information
- Born: 20 February 2006 (age 20) Adelaide, Australia
- Height: 1.81 m (5 ft 11 in)
- Weight: 64 kg (141 lb)

Cycling career
- Sport: Cycling
- Current team: Hagens Berman Jayco
- Disciplines: Road; Track
- Role: Rider
- Rider type: Time trialist

Amateur team
- 2023–2024: ARA-Skip Capital

Professional teams
- 2025–2026: Hagens Berman Jayco
- 2027–: Team Jayco–AlUla
Medal record
Men's track cycling
Representing Australia
World Junior Championships
Silver medal – second place	2024 Luoyang	Individual Pursuit

William Holmes (born 20 February 2006) is an Australian cyclist who rides for UCI Continental team Hagens Berman Jayco. In 2024, he became the junior World Record holder in the 3 km Individual Pursuit. In 2027, he will join UCI WorldTeam Team Jayco–AlUla.

== Career ==
From Adelaide, he competed on the road for ARA-Skip Capital and U19 Academy Région Sud pb Giant for two seasons. He became the Australian men's junior time trial champion in January 2024.

He won the individual time trial stage at Vuelta a Cantabria (UCI 2.1) He broke the junior men's Individual Pursuit national record at the 2024 Australian Track Nationals, finishing in 3:08.181, five seconds faster than the previous record. Then in August 2024, he won silver in the individual pursuit at the 2024 UCI Junior Track Cycling World Championships and recorded a time of 3:04.161 in qualifying to set a world junior record in Luoyang, China.

He finished fourth in the Junior men’s time trial at the 2024 UCI Road World Championships in Zurich in September 2024. Later that year he signed for UCI Continental team Hagens Berman Jayco.

In January 2026, he won the U23 title at the Australian National Time Trial Championships. Ahead of the 2027 season, Holmes signed for UCI WorldTeam Team Jayco-AlUla.

== Major results ==
2023
1st Time trial, Oceania Junior Road Championships
National Junior Road Championships

1st Criterium
2nd Time trial
3rd Road race

5th Liège–Bastogne–Liège Juniors
9th Overall Sint-Martinusprijs Kontich
9th Overall Gipuzkoa Klasikoa
2024
National Junior Road Championships

1st Time trial
2nd Road race

1st Stage 1 (ITT) Vuelta a Cantabria
2nd Gran Premio Sportivi di Loria
4th Time trial, UCI Junior Road World Championships
4th Overall Gipuzkoa Klasikoa
5th Liège–Bastogne–Liège Juniors
6th Giro di Primavera
9th Overall Côte d'Or Classic Juniors
10th Overall Trophée Centre Morbihan
2025
4th Time trial, National Under-23 Road Championships
2026
National Under-23 Road Championships

1st Time trial
5th Road race
