= Ceredigion (disambiguation) =

Ceredigion is a county in Mid Wales.

Ceredigion may also refer to:

- Kingdom of Ceredigion, a medieval kingdom in this area
- Ceredigion, former UK Parliament constituency
- Ceredigion Preseli, current UK Parliament constituency
- Ceredigion (Senedd constituency), current Senedd constituency
- Ceredigion Penfro, proposed Senedd constituency
- Ceredigion (journal), an annual local history journal in Ceredigion
