= Carys Lloyd =

British cyclist (born 2006)

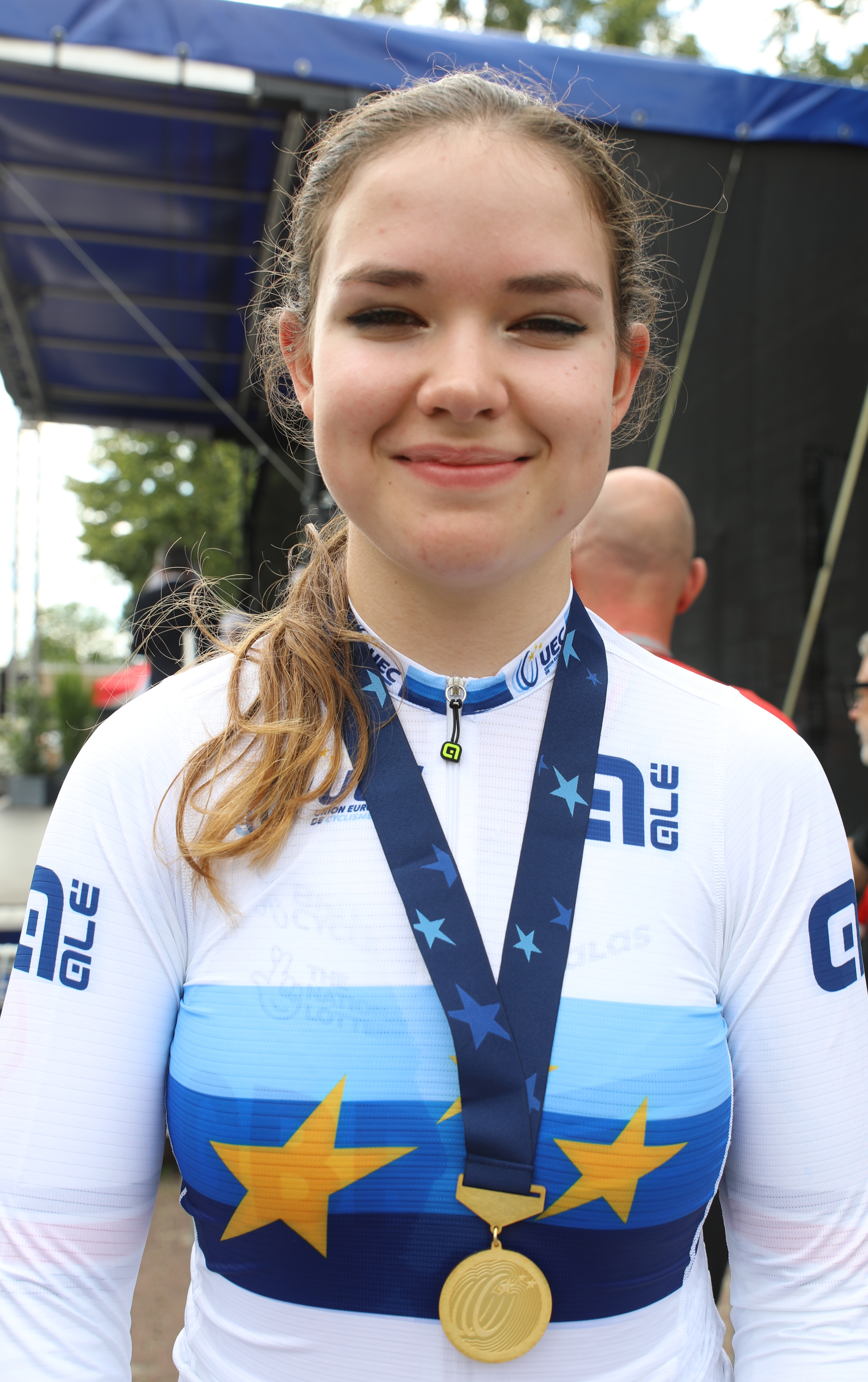
- Lloyd in 2024

Personal information
- Full name: Carys Isobel Lloyd
- Born: 31 December 2006 (age 19)

Cycling career
- Sport: Cycling
- Current team: Movistar Team
- Disciplines: Track; Road
- Role: Rider
- Rider type: All-rounder

Amateur team
- 2023–2024: Tofauti Everyone Active

Professional team
- 2025–: Movistar Team

Major wins
- One-day races and Classics Tour of Bruges (2026)
Medal record
Representing United Kingdom
Women's track cycling
European Under-23 Championships
| Gold medal – first place | 2025 Anadia | Team pursuit |
World Junior Championships
| Gold medal – first place | 2024 Luoyang | Madison |
| Gold medal – first place | 2024 Luoyang | Individual pursuit |
| Gold medal – first place | 2024 Luoyang | Team pursuit |
European Junior Championships
| Gold medal – first place | 2023 Anadia | Madison |
| Gold medal – first place | 2024 Cottbus | Omnium |
| Gold medal – first place | 2024 Cottbus | Madison |
| Silver medal – second place | 2024 Cottbus | Team pursuit |
| Bronze medal – third place | 2023 Anadia | Team pursuit |

Carys Isobel Lloyd (born 31 December 2006) is a British professional cyclist who rides for UCI Women's World Team Movistar Team. She won three gold medals at the 2024 UCI Junior Track Cycling World Championships.

== Career ==
From Maidstone, Kent, she raced as a junior for Tofauti Everyone Active. In 2023, she won the Madison at the 2023 UEC European Track Championships in Anadia, Portugal. She also won GP Plouay in 2023 and won two stages of the premier UCI Nations Cup event, the Dutch Omloop van Borsele in 2024. She also won a bronze medal at the 2024 British Time Trial Championships.

She won a gold medal and two silver medals at the 2024 UEC European Track Championships in Cottbus in July 2024. Alongside Cat Ferguson, Imogen Wolff and Erin Boothman she won silver in the junior team pursuit. She won gold in the Madison event alongside Ferguson, and gold in the Omnium at the Championships.

She won three gold medals at the 2024 UCI Junior Track Cycling World Championships in Luoyang, China. As part of the British women's team pursuit team alongside Cat Ferguson, Imogen Wolff and Erin Boothman she set a new world record time of 4:20.811 to beat France in the final. She also won the women's individual pursuit race at the Championships in August 2024, as well as the Madison alongside Boothman.

She signed for Movistar Team ahead of the 2025 season, agreeing a three-year contract. She became the youngest rider on the men or women's WorldTours for the 2025 season.

In March 2026, she won her first UCI Women's World Tour race at Tour of Bruges, winning in a sprint finish. Lloyd was named in the Wales team for the 2026 Commonwealth Games in Glasgow.

== Personal life ==
She has Welsh heritage. She was a student at Maidstone Grammar School (2024-2025) in year 13 Corpus Christi House.

== Major results ==
=== Road ===
2023
1st Grand Prix Ceratizit Juniors
3rd Overall Watersley Challenge

1st Youth classification

2024
5th Overall EPZ Omloop van Borsele Juniors

1st Stages 2 & 3

10th Lincoln Grand Prix
2025
2nd À travers les Hauts-de-France
10th Trofeo Marratxi-Felanitx
2026 (1 pro win)
1st Tour of Bruges

=== Track ===
2023
UEC European Junior Championships

1st Madison (with Isabel Sharp)
3rd Team pursuit

2024
UCI World Junior Championships

1st Individual pursuit
1st Madison (with Erin Boothman)
1st Team pursuit

UEC European Junior Championships

1st Madison (with Cat Ferguson)
1st Omnium
2nd Team pursuit
