= Imogen Wolff =

British cyclist (born 2006)

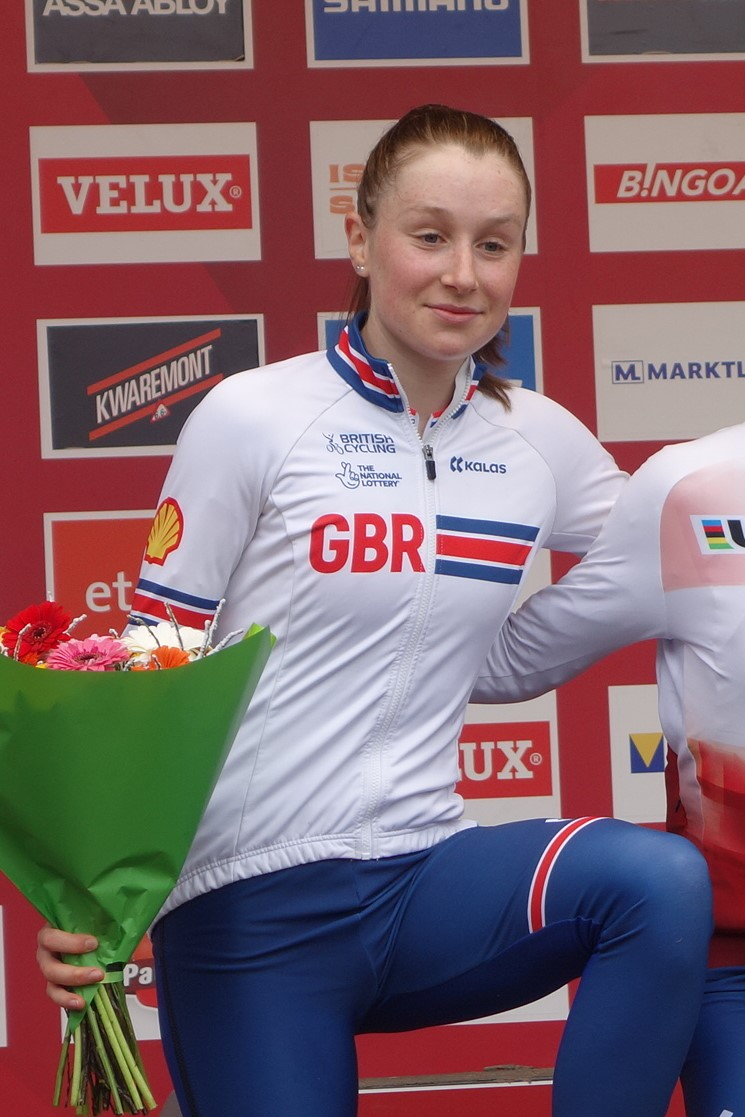
- Wolff in 2023

Personal information
- Born: 26 March 2006 (age 20)

Cycling career
- Sport: Cycling
- Current team: Visma–Lease a Bike
- Disciplines: Track; Road; Cyclo-cross
- Role: Rider
- Rider type: All-rounder

Amateur team
- 2023–2024: Shibden Hope Tech Apex

Professional teams
- 2024: Visma–Lease a Bike (stagiaire)
- 2025–: Visma–Lease a Bike
Medal record
Representing Great Britain
Women's track cycling
World Junior Championships
Gold medal – first place	2024 Luoyang	Points race
Gold medal – first place	2024 Luoyang	Team pursuit
European Junior Championships
Silver medal – second place	2024 Cottbus	Team pursuit
Women's road bicycle racing
World Championships
Bronze medal – third place	2024 Zurich	Junior time trial
Women's cyclo-cross
European Championships
Silver medal – second place	2023 Pontchâteau	Team relay

Imogen Wolff (born 26 March 2006) is a British cyclist who rides as a stagiaire for UCI Women's WorldTeam Visma–Lease a Bike. She won two gold medals at the 2024 UCI Junior Track Cycling World Championships and won bronze in the junior time trial at the 2024 UCI Road World Championships.

== Career ==
In March 2024 she won The Piccolo Trofeo Binda, the opening race of the junior women's Nation's Cup, with a solo attack. She won the British national junior time trial in June 2024.

She won two gold medals at the 2024 UCI Junior Track Cycling World Championships in Luoyang, China. As part of the British women's team pursuit team alongside Cat Ferguson, Carys Lloyd and Erin Boothman she set a new world record time of 4:20.811 to beat France in the final. She also won the women's points race at the Championships in August 2024.

In September 2024, she came third in the junior time trial at the 2024 UCI Road World Championships in Zurich. That month, she signed for UCI Women's World Tour Team Visma–Lease a Bike, signing a contract until 2027. She was named in the team at the 2025 Tour de France Femmes, at the age of 19 she was the youngest rider in the race.

In February 2026, she rode as part of the senior British team at the 2026 UEC European Track Championships in Konya, Turkey.

== Personal life ==
She is from Silkstone Common in South Yorkshire. Her mother represented GB in triathlon, while her father was a keen club cyclist.

== Major results ==
=== Cyclo-cross ===
2022–2023
1st National Junior Championships
2023–2024
National Junior Trophy Series

1st South Shields
2nd Thornton in Craven

UEC European Championships

2nd Team relay
5th Junior race

Hope Supercross Junior

2nd Herrington Country Park
2nd Bradford

2nd Junior Hulst
4th Overall UCI Junior World Cup

2nd Antwerp
3rd Dublin
4th Benidorm
5th Troyes

2024–2025
3rd National Championships
Exact Cross

3rd Loenhout

=== Road ===
2023
5th Road race, UCI World Junior Championships
7th Tour of Flanders Juniors
10th Overall Watersley Ladies Challenge
2024
1st Piccolo Trofeo Alfredo Binda
2nd Road race, National Junior Championships
UCI World Junior Championships

3rd Time trial
6th Road race

3rd Lincoln GP
4th Overall Tour du Gévaudan Occitanie
4th Gent–Wevelgem Juniors
4th Tour of Flanders Juniors
2025
5th Overall Vuelta a Extremadura

1st Young rider classification
1st Stage 3

=== Track ===
2024
UCI World Junior Championships

1st Points race
1st Team pursuit

2nd Team pursuit, UEC European Junior Championships
2026
UEC European Under-23 Championships

1st Scratch
2nd Madison (with Isabel Sharp)
