= Matthias Schwarzbacher =

Slovak cyclist (born 2005)

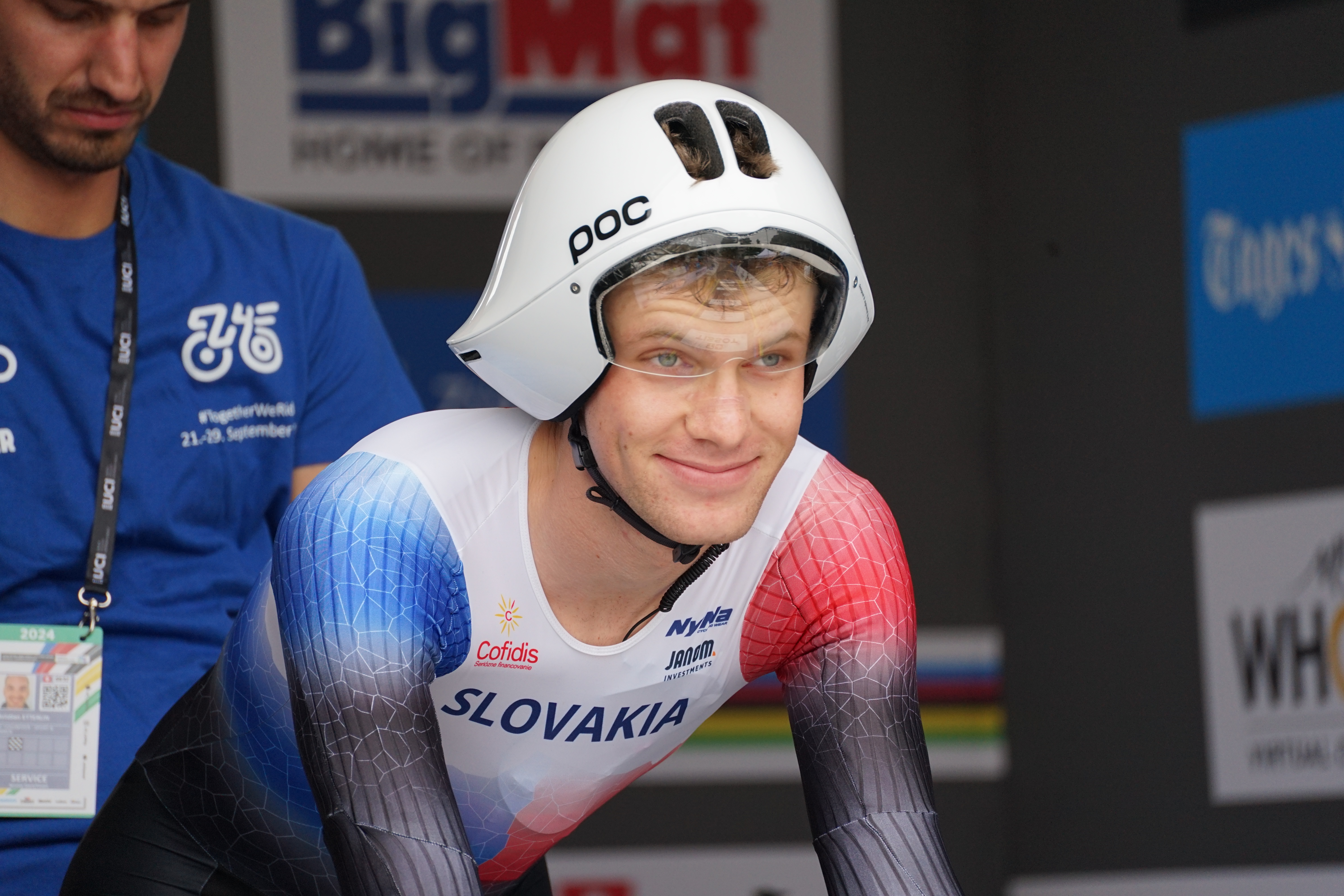
- Schwarzbacher during the 2024 UCI Road World Championships in Zurich

Personal information
- Nickname: Arnold
- Born: 22 December 2005 (age 20) Brezno, Slovakia

Cycling career
- Sport: Cycling
- Current team: EF Education–EasyPost
- Discipline: Road
- Role: Rider
- Rider type: Classics Specialist

Amateur team
- 2023: CPS Professional Team

Professional teams
- 2024: ATT Investments
- 2025: UAE Team Emirates Gen Z
- 2025–: EF Education–EasyPost

Major wins
- One-day races and Classics National Time Trial Championships (2025)

Matthias Schwarzbacher (born 22 December 2005) is a Slovak cyclist, who currently rides for UCI WorldTeam EF Education–EasyPost.

== Major results ==
2023
1st Overall Medzinárodné dni cyklistiky Dubnica nad Váhom

1st Points classification
1st Stage 2

National Junior Road Championships

2nd Road race
6th Time trial

4th Overall Nation's Cup Hungary
10th Gran Premio Eccellenze Valli del Soligo (TTT)
2024
National U23 Road Championships

1st Time trial
4th Road race

National Road Championships

2nd Time trial
4th Road race

3rd Overall Tour of Szeklerland

1st Young rider classification

8th Overall West Bohemia Tour

1st Prologue

2025 (1 pro win)
National Road Championships

1st Time trial
3rd Road race

1st Trofej Umag
1st Stage 1 Giro Next Gen (ITT)
4th Giro del Belvedere
6th Overall Volta ao Alentejo
6th Paris–Roubaix Espoirs
8th Trofeo Ses Salines
10th Classica da Arrábida
