= 2026 UCI Track Cycling World Championships – Men's 1 km time trial =

Men's 1 km time trial at the 2026 UCI Track Cycling World Championships
- Venue: Shanghai Velodrome
- Location: Shanghai, China
- Dates: 16 October
- Competitors: 28 from 22 nations
- Winning time: 58.713

Medalists
gold medal	Jeffrey Hoogland	Netherlands
silver medal	Étienne Oliviero	France
bronze medal	Joseph Truman	Great Britain

The Men's 1 km time trial competition at the 2026 UCI Track Cycling World Championships was held on 16 October 2026.

== Results ==
=== Qualifying ===
The qualifying was started at 12:00. The top eight riders qualified for the final.

Rank	Name	Nation	Time	Behind	Notes
1	Jeffrey Hoogland	Netherlands	58.680		Q
2	Étienne Oliviero	France	58.884	+0.204	Q
3	Joseph Truman	Great Britain	59.232	+0.552	Q
4	Kirill Kurdidi	Kazakhstan	59.915	+1.235	Q
5	Maximilian Dörnbach	Germany	1:00.016	+1.336	Q
6	James Hedgcock	Canada	1:00.033	+1.353	Q
7	Benjamin Boos	Germany	1:00.103	+1.423	Q
8	Matteo Bianchi	Italy	1:00.217	+1.537	Q
9	Thomas Cornish	Australia	1:00.534	+1.854	
10	Tijmen van Loon	Netherlands	1:00.688	+2.008	
11	Igor Girilovich	Individual Neutral Athletes	1:00.776	+2.096	
12	Sun Wentao	China	1:01.243	+2.563	
13	Jan Pořízek	Czechia	1:01.346	+2.666	
14	Daniyar Shayakhmetov	Kazakhstan	1:01.602	+2.922	
15	Cristian Ortega	Colombia	1:01.661	+2.981	
16	Anders Johnson	United States	1:01.700	+3.020	
17	Shoi Matsuda	Japan	1:01.812	+3.132	
18	Fabio Del Medico	Italy	1:01.848	+3.168	
19	Edward Lowe	Great Britain	1:02.152	+3.472	
20	Yung Tsun Ho	Hong Kong	1:02.183	+3.503	
21	Alejandro Martínez	Spain	1:02.275	+3.595	
22	Gianluca Pollefliet	Belgium	1:02.390	+3.710	
23	Jung Ho-jin	South Korea	1:02.604	+3.924	
24	Norasetthada Bunma	Thailand	1:02.987	+4.307	
25	Patrik Rómeó Lovassy	Hungary	1:03.104	+4.424	
26	Campbell Parrish	Canada	1:03.502	+4.822	
27	Terry Yudha Kusuma	Indonesia	1:05.227	+6.547	
28	Sebastián Ruiz	Mexico	1:07.262	+8.582	
	Adam Rauschgold	Czechia	Did not start		

=== Final ===
The final was held at 18:37.

Rank	Name	Nation	Time	Behind	Notes
1st place, gold medalist(s)	Jeffrey Hoogland	Netherlands	58.713		
2nd place, silver medalist(s)	Étienne Oliviero	France	59.365	+0.652	
3rd place, bronze medalist(s)	Joseph Truman	Great Britain	59.414	+0.701	
4	James Hedgcock	Canada	1:00.299	+1.586	
5	Kirill Kurdidi	Kazakhstan	1:00.454	+1.741	
6	Maximilian Dörnbach	Germany	1:00.552	+1.839	
7	Benjamin Boos	Germany	1:00.662	+1.949	
8	Matteo Bianchi	Italy	1:00.805	+2.092	
