= Joseba López =

Spanish cyclist

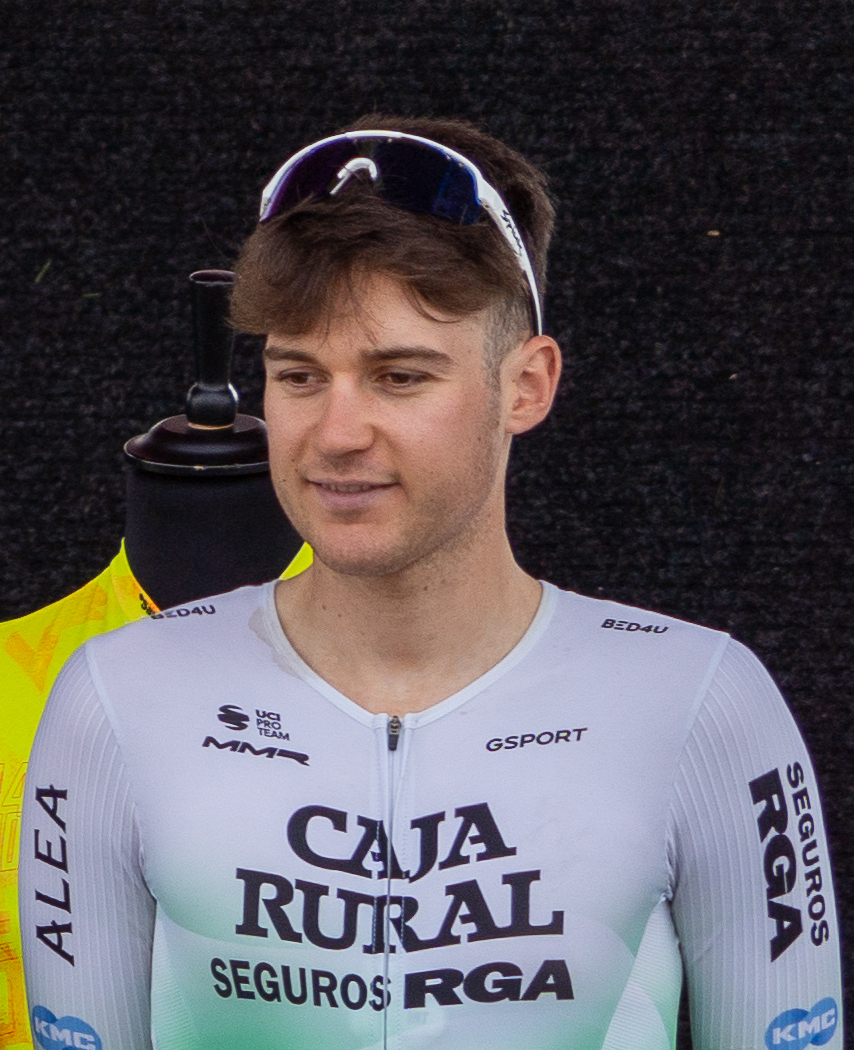
- López in 2024

Personal information
- Full name: Joseba López Cuesta
- Born: 5 March 2000 (age 26) Mondragón, Spain
- Height: 1.81 m (5 ft 11 in)
- Weight: 66 kg (146 lb)

Cycling career
- Sport: Cycling
- Current team: Caja Rural–Seguros RGA
- Discipline: Road
- Role: Rider

Amateur teams
- 2018–2021: Grupo Eulen
- 2022: Caja Rural–Alea

Professional teams
- 2022: Caja Rural–Seguros RGA (stagiaire)
- 2023–: Caja Rural–Seguros RGA

Joseba López Cuesta (born 5 March 2000) is a Spanish cyclist, who currently rides for UCI ProTeam Caja Rural–Seguros RGA.

== Major results ==
2020
1st Ereñoko Udala Sari Nagusia
2022
1st Road race, National Under-23 Road Championships
1st Memorial José María Anza
1st San Bartolomé Saria
2024
1st Classica da Arrábida
