= Étienne Oliviero =

French cyclist (born 2006)

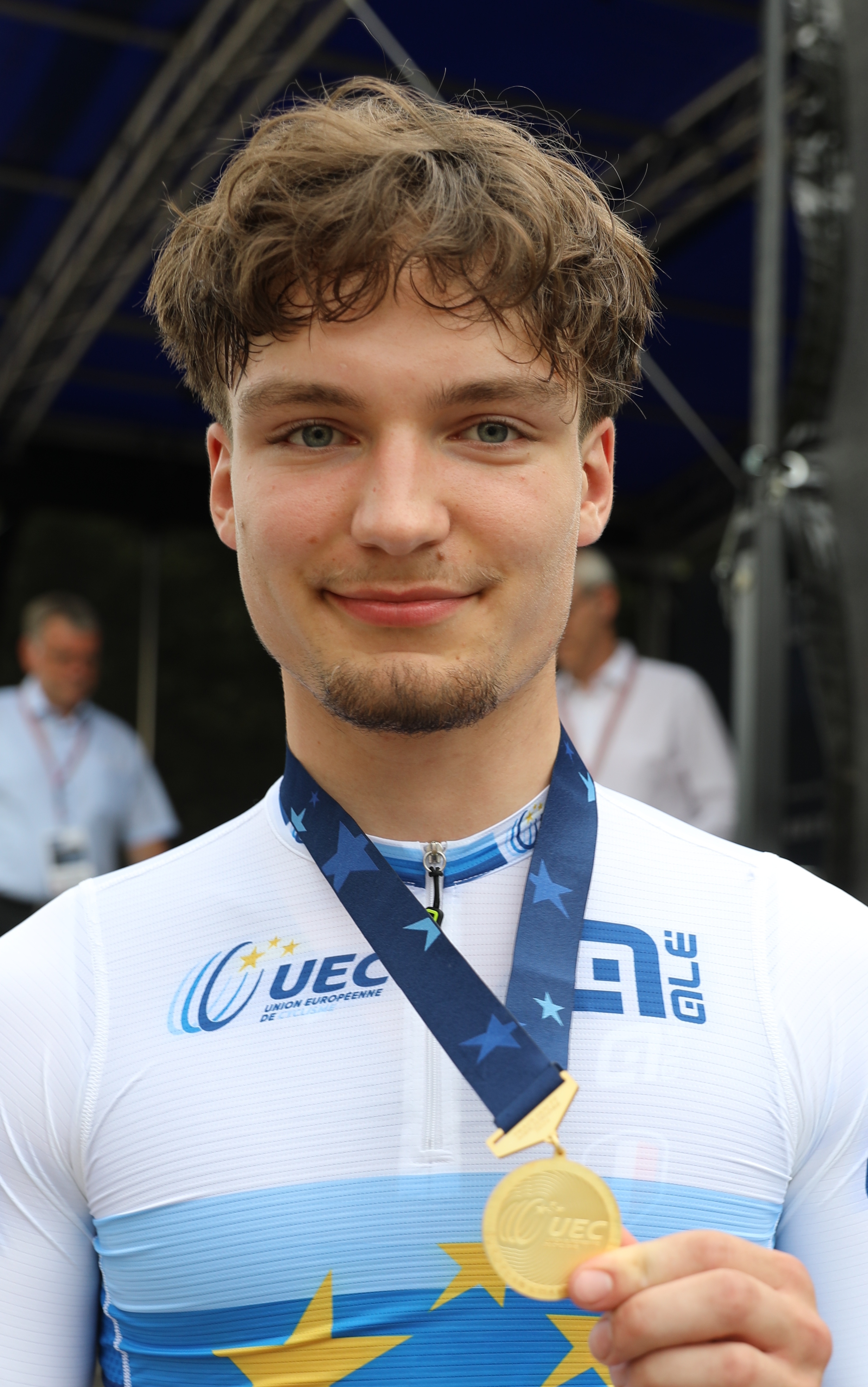
- Oliviero in 2024

Personal information
- Born: 9 May 2006 (age 20) Vannes, France

Cycling career
- Sport: Cycling
- Discipline: Track
- Role: Rider
- Rider type: Sprinter
Medal record
Men's track cycling
Representing France
World Championships
Silver medal – second place	2026 Shanghai	1 km time trial
European Championshipss
Gold medal – first place	2026 Konya	Team sprint
Silver medal – second place	2026 Konya	1 km time trial
European Under-23 Championships
Silver medal – second place	2025 Anadia	1 km time trial
Bronze medal – third place	2025 Anadia	Team sprint
European Junior Championships
Gold medal – first place	2024 Cottbus	Team sprint
Gold medal – first place	2024 Cottbus	1 km time trial
Silver medal – second place	2023 Anadia	Team sprint
Bronze medal – third place	2023 Anadia	Kierin
Bronze medal – third place	2023 Anadia	Sprint
Bronze medal – third place	2024 Cottbus	Sprint

Étienne Oliviero (born 9 May 2006) is a French track cyclist. He was a gold medalist representing France in the team sprint, and a silver medalist in the men's 1 km time trial, at the 2026 UEC European Track Championships.

== Career ==
From Vannes, Oliviero's first cycling club was OC Locminé. He won the silver medal in the team sprint, as well as two individual bronze medals in the sprint and kierin, at the 2023 UEC Junior European Championships in Anadia, Portugal. He trained in Bourges at the CREPS Centre Val de Loire sports centre. He won gold medals in the team sprint and the 1 km time trial at the 2024 UEC Junior European Championships in Cottbus, Germany.

In 2025, Olivero became the French senior 1 km time trial champion at the age of 18 years-old, and was selected as part of the senior French team for the 2025 UEC European Track Championships in Heusden-Zolder, Belgium. From September, he trained as a member of the French Olympic training centre in Saint-Quentin-en-Yvelines.

In January 2026, he retained his French kilometre title. In February 2026, Olivero won a gold medal as a member of the French team in the men's team sprint at the 2026 UEC European Track Championships in Konya, Turkey, alongside Timmy Gillion and Rayan Helal, with Olivero riding the final lap and holding off Olympic medalist Matt Richardson of Great Britain. Later at the championships, he also won a silver medal in the men's 1 km time trial. He had set the fastest time in qualifying, before in the final round placing behind Joseph Truman of Great Britain, but ahead of Czech rider David Peterka.
