= UCI Junior Nations' Cup =

- Sport: Road bicycle racing
- Founded: 2008
- Country: Worldwide

The UCI Junior Nations' Cup is an annual, season-long competition for junior (age 17/18) road cyclists. It was created by the Union Cycliste Internationale in 2008 to aid in the development of young riders.

== Races ==
Races highlighted in yellow are no longer part of the nations cup.

| Event | Year |
|---|---|
| (Canada) Tour de l'Abitibi | 2008–2011, 2014–2019, 2022– |
| (France) Paris–Roubaix Juniors | 2008-2019, 2022– |
| (Czech Republic) Course de la Paix Juniors | 2008–2019, 2021– |
| (Germany) Saarland Trofeo | 2008–2019, 2021– |
| Junior World Time Trial Championships | 2008–2019, 2021– |
| Junior World Road Race Championships | 2008–2019, 2021– |
| African Junior Championships | 2012–2019, 2021– |
| European Junior Championships | 2012– |
| (France) Trophée Centre Morbihan | 2013–2019, 2022– |
| (Switzerland) Tour du Pays de Vaud | 2015–2019, 2022– |
| (Belgium) Gent–Wevelgem Juniors | 2016–2019, 2022– |
| (South Korea) Tour de DMZ | 2017–2019, 2022– |
| One Belt One Road Nation's Cup Hungary | 2021– |
| (Netherlands) Watersley Junior Challenge | 2022– |
| (Croatia) Kroz Istru | 2008–2009, 2011–2014 |
| (Luxembourg) Grand Prix Général Patton | 2008–2019 |
| GP Denmark | 2011 |
| Pan American Junior Championships | 2012–2016 |
| Asian Junior Championships | 2012–2019 |
| Oceania Junior Championships | 2017–2019 |
| (Hungary) Visegrad 4 Juniors | 2020 |
