= Maria Okrucińska =

Polish cyclist (born 2008)

Personal information
- Born: 5 March 2008 (age 18)

Cycling career
- Sport: Cycling
- Current team: Grouwels-Watersley R&D Road Team
- Discipline: Road
- Role: Rider
- Rider type: Time trialist; All-rounder

Amateur team
- 2025–2026: Grouwels-Watersley R&D Road Team
Medal record
Representing Poland
Women's road bicycle racing
World Championships
| Gold medal – first place | 2026 Montreal | Junior time trial |

Maria Okrucińska (born 5 March 2008) is a Polish road cyclist who rides for Grouwels-Watersley R&D Road Team. She won the Junior World Championships time trial in 2026.

== Career ==
She is a Toruń-based graduate of Michał Kwiatkowski's cycling academy. Her father, Daniel, is a former cyclist who founded the UKS Copernicus Toruń CCC club. As a 16 year-old in 2024, she won nine Polish Championship age-group titles across cycling disciplines. Following that season she started to ride abroad, choosing to represent the Dutch Grouwels-Watersley R&D Road Team. In 2025, she placed fourth in the road race at the European Junior Championships, and finished seventh in the individual time trial.

In September 2026, while competing at the UCI Road World Championships in Montreal, Canada, she won the Junior World Championships time trial and placed fourth in the Junior World Championships road race, having been part of a 5-woman breakaway. She won the time trial by twelve seconds ahead of the second place rider, Yana Decruyenaere of Belgium, and 24 seconds ahead of the third place rider, Aalia Clay of Great Britain, having completed the 10.7 km course with an average speed of 42 km/h.

== Major results ==
2025
National Junior Road Championships

1st Road race
1st Time trial

2nd Overall Watersley Ladies Challenge

1st Young rider classification
1st Stage 2

2nd Grand Prix Valromey Tour Féminin II
European Junior Road Championships

4th Road race
7th Time trial

5th Ronde van Vlaanderen Juniors
5th Druivenkoers Overijse Juniors
7th Grand Prix Valromey Tour Féminin
8th Piccolo Trofeo Alfredo Binda
UCI Road World Junior Championships

7th Time trial
9th Road race

2026
UCI Road World Junior Championships

1st Time trial
4th Road race

National Junior Road Championships

1st Time trial
3rd Road race

1st Overall Watersley Ladies Challenge

1st Points classification
1st Stage 2

1st Overall Omloop van Borsele Juniors

1st Points classification
1st Stage 1 (ITT)

3rd Piccolo Trofeo Alfredo Binda
4th Clásica de Jaén Nation's Cup Women
