= 2024 UEC European Track Championships (under-23 & junior) =

Track cycling championship

- Venue: (Germany) Cottbus
- Date: 9–14 July
- Velodrome: Lausitz Velodrome

The 2024 UEC European Track Championships (under-23 & junior) were the 24th continental championships for European under-23 and junior track cyclists, and the 15th since the event was renamed following the reorganisation of European track cycling in 2010. The event took place at the Lausitz Velodrome in Cottbus, Germany from 9 to 14 July 2024.

== Medal summary ==
=== Under-23 ===
Event	Gold		Silver		Bronze	
Men's events
Sprint	Luca Spiegel; Germany		Hayden Norris; Great Britain		Runar De Schrijver; Belgium	
Team sprint	Italy; Daniele Napolitano; Mattia Predomo; Stefano Minuta	58.546	Great Britain; Harry Ledingham-Horn; Marcus Hiley; Hayden Norris	59.114	Poland; Szymon Wiśniewski; Konrad Burawski; Eliasz Bednarek	1:00.225
1 km time trial	Hayden Norris; Great Britain	1:01.663	Henric Hackmann; Germany	1:02.083	Harry Ledingham-Horn; Great Britain	1:02.434
Keirin	Mattia Predomo; Italy		Henric Hackmann; Germany		Oscar Caron; France	
Individual pursuit	Noah Vandenbranden; Belgium	4:17.038	Manlio Moro; Italy	4:20.845	Thibaut Bernard; Belgium	4:22.471
Team pursuit	Italy; Renato Favero; Luca Giaimi; Manlio Moro; Niccolò Galli; Samuel Quaranta		Belgium; Renzo Raes; Noah Vandenbranden; Thibaut Bernard; Milan Van den Haute; Stan Dens	OVL	Germany; Leon Arenz; Bruno Kessler; Ben Felix Jochum; Benjamin Boos	
Points race	Conrad Haugsted; Denmark	104 pts	Ben Wiggins; Great Britain	86 pts	Thibaut Bernard; Belgium	47 pts
Scratch	Noah Hobbs; Great Britain		Tim Wafler; Austria		Elmar Abma; Netherlands	
Madison	Austria; Tim Wafler; Raphael Kokas	58 pts	Great Britain; Ben Wiggins; Noah Hobbs	49 pts	Belgium; Noah Vandenbranden; Tom Crabbe	42 pts
Omnium	Noah Vandenbranden; Belgium	116 pts	Noah Hobbs; Great Britain	104 pts	Matteo Constant; Switzerland	98 pts
Elimination race	Noah Wulff; Denmark		Emmanuel Houcou; France		Mario Anguela; Spain	
Women's events
Sprint	Taky Marie-Divine Kouamé; France		Clara Schneider; Germany		Rhian Edmunds; Great Britain	
Team sprint	Great Britain; Rhianna Parris-Smith; Rhian Edmunds; Iona Moir	1:05.323	Germany; Stella Müller; Lara-Sophie Jäger; Clara Schneider	1:05.826	Czech Republic; Sára Kateřina Peterková; Anna Jaborníková; Michaela Poulová	1:09.186
500 m time trial	Taky Marie-Divine Kouamé; France	34.714	Clara Schneider; Germany	34.875	Kimberly Kalee; Netherlands	34.980
Keirin	Clara Schneider; Germany		Iona Moir; Great Britain		Alla Biletska; Ukraine	
Individual pursuit	Federica Venturelli; Italy		Leila Gschwentner; Austria	OVL	Martyna Szczęsna; Poland	3:38.574
Team pursuit	Great Britain; Sophie Lewis; Maddie Leech; Elizabeth Grace Lister; Isabel Sharp	4:36.650	Switzerland; Jasmin Liechti; Annika Liehner; Janice Stettler; Lorena Leu	4:38.640	Italy; Sara Fiorin; Francesca Pellegrini; Federica Venturelli; Vittoria Grassi	4:33.068
Points race	Ainara Albert Bosch; Spain	166 pts	Zuzanna Chylińska; Poland	43 pts	Maddie Leech; Great Britain	31 pts
Scratch	Marina Garau; Spain		Nienke Veenhoven; Netherlands		Nora Tveit; Norway	
Madison	Belgium; Katrijn De Clercq; Hélène Hesters	30 pts	Great Britain; Maddie Leech; Elizabeth Grace Lister	26 pts	Germany; Justyna Czapla; Seana Littbarski-Gray	25 pts
Omnium	Olga Wankiewicz; Poland	126 pts	Marith Vanhove; Belgium	118 pts	Federica Venturelli; Italy	107 pts
Elimination race	Sophie Lewis; Great Britain		Eva Anguela; Spain		Gabriela Bártová; Czech Republic	

=== Junior ===
Event	Gold		Silver		Bronze	
Men's events
Sprint	Colin Rudolph; Germany		Tomasz Łamaszewski; Poland		Etienne Oliviero; France	
Team sprint	France; Etienne Oliviero; Matthias Sylvanise; Tristan Favennec	1:00.263	Germany; Colin Rudolph; Tim-Louis Werner; Theo Fischer; Benjamin Bock	1:01.289	Czech Republic; Jan Pořízek; David Peterka; Kryštof Friedl; Adam Rauschgold	1:00.953
1 km time trial	Etienne Oliviero; France	1:03.076	Luca Nissel; Germany	1:04.592	David Peterka; Czech Republic	1:04.731
Keirin	Oliver Pettifer; Great Britain		Benjamin Bock; Germany		Yeno Vingerhoets; Belgium	
Individual pursuit	Paul-Felix Petry; Germany	3:17.485	Jacopo Sasso; Italy	3:20.643	Oscar Vosgerau; Denmark	3:20.516
Team pursuit	Italy; Davide Stella; Christian Fantini; Ares Costa; Alessio Magagnotti; Eros Sporzon		Germany; Hugo Esch; Louis Gentzik; Paul-Felix Petry; Attila Höfig; Ian Kings	OVL	Great Britain; William Salter; Finlay Tarling; Sam Fisher; Henry Hobbs	4:07.515
Points race	Heimo Fugger; Austria	26 pts	Julian Bortolami; Italy	21 pts	Sam Fisher; Great Britain	20 pts
Scratch	Heorhii Chyzhykov; Ukraine		Davide Stella; Italy		Nolan Huysmans; Belgium	
Madison	Italy; Davide Stella; Eros Sporzon	40 pts	Denmark; Albert Hansgaard Jensen; Aksel Storm	32 pts	Belgium; Nolan Huysmans; Matijs Van Strijthem	27 pts
Omnium	William Salter; Great Britain	116 pts	Matijs Van Strijthem; Belgium	111 pts	Marceli Pera; Poland	106 pts
Elimination race	Ruben Sanchez Cordoba; Spain		Heimo Fugger; Austria		Hansgaard Albert Jensen; Denmark	
Women's events
Sprint	Georgette Rand; Great Britain		Anastasia Kuniß; Germany		Natalia Walecka; Poland	
Team sprint	Germany; Anastasia Kuniß; Amy Weber; Emilia Waterstradt	1:07.242	Poland; Natalia Walecka; Paulina Hojka; Weronika Skrzyńska; Matylda Głowacka	1:09.251	Italy; Erja Giulia Bianchi; Siria Trevisan; Matilde Cenci	1:10.821
500 m time trial	Georgette Rand; Great Britain	35.701	Anastasia Kuniß; Germany	36.060	Siria Trevisan; Italy	36.917
Keirin	Georgette Rand; Great Britain		Anastasia Kuniß; Germany		Lauryna Valiukevičiūtė; Lithuania	
Individual pursuit	Joelle Amelie Messemer; Germany	2:28.273	Luca Vierstraete; Belgium	2:30.331	Milana Ushakova; Ukraine	2:30.240
Team pursuit	Germany; Messane Bräutigam; Joelle Amelie Messemer; Julia Servay; Magdalena Leis; Judith Friederike Rottmann	4:36.285	Great Britain; Imogen Wolff; Cat Ferguson; Erin Boothman; Carys Lloyd	4:37.092	Italy; Asia Sgaravato; Virginia Iaccarino; Linda Sanarini; Silvia Milesi	4:43.233
Points race	Lucy Bénézet Minns; Ireland	89 pts	Jenna van Tongeren; Netherlands	65 pts	Chantal Pegolo; Italy	43 pts
Scratch	Auke De Buysser; Belgium		Chantal Pegolo; Italy		Valentina Ferreyra Beltramo; Spain	
Madison	Great Britain; Cat Ferguson; Isobel Lloyd	37 pts	Italy; Anita Baima; Linda Sanarini	37 pts	Germany; Messane Bräutigam; Judith Friederike Rottmann	33 pts
Omnium	Isobel Lloyd; Great Britain	126 pts	Linda Sanarini; Italy	123 pts	Weronika Wąsaty; Poland	108 pts
Elimination race	Anita Baima; Italy		Laerke Expeels; Belgium		Erin Boothman; Great Britain	

== Medal table ==
* Host nation (Germany)

Rank	Nation	Gold	Silver	Bronze	Total
1	Great Britain	12	8	6	26
2	Germany*	7	12	3	22
3	Italy	7	7	6	20
4	Belgium	4	5	7	16
5	France	4	1	2	7
6	Spain	3	1	2	6
7	Austria	2	3	0	5
8	Denmark	2	1	2	5
9	Poland	1	3	5	9
10	Ukraine	1	0	2	3
11	Ireland	1	0	0	1
12	Netherlands	0	2	2	4
13	Switzerland	0	1	1	2
14	Czech Republic	0	0	4	4
15	Lithuania	0	0	1	1
15	Norway	0	0	1	1
Totals (16 entries)		44	44	44	132
