= Mateo Ramírez (cyclist) =

Ecuadorian cyclist (born 2006)

Personal information
- Full name: Mateo Pablo Ramírez Torres
- Born: 9 March 2006 (age 20) Quito, Ecuador

Cycling career
- Sport: Cycling
- Current team: UAE Team Emirates Gen Z
- Discipline: Road
- Role: Rider

Amateur teams
- 2023–2024: Cycling Team Junior Ciudad de Talavera
- 2025: High Level–GSport

Professional team
- 2025–: UAE Team Emirates Gen Z

Mateo Pablo Ramírez Torres (born 9 March 2006) is an Ecuadorian cyclist, who currently rides for UCI Continental team UAE Team Emirates Gen Z.

== Major results ==
2023
National Junior Road Championships

1st Road race
1st Time trial

1st Overall Vuelta de la Juventud

1st Stages 1 (ITT) & 2

2nd Gran Premio Ayuntamiento de Valdefresno
5th Road race, Pan American Junior Road Championships
5th Overall Vuelta a Talavera
6th Overall Trofeo Ayuntamiento Valdáliga Challenge
2024
Bolivarian Youth Games

1st Time trial
10th Road Race

National Junior Road Championships

1st Road race
5th Time trial

1st Overall Vuelta de la Juventud

1st Sprints classification
1st Mountains classification
1st Stages 1, 2, 3 & 4

1st Memorial José Luis Junco
1st Memorial Ángel Cabrero
1st Mountains classification, Circuito Cantabro Junior
2nd Road race, Pan American Junior Road Championships
2nd Cursa Ciclista del Llobregat
2nd Gran Premio Villa de Cervera
2nd Gran Premio El Ramo Petrogold
3rd Overall Vuelta a la Subbética

1st Mountains classification

4th Overall Vuelta a Pamplona
6th Vuelta Ciclista Camporrobles
2025
National Road Championships

2nd Under-23 time tial
3rd Road race

2nd Overall Giro della Valle d'Aosta

1st Young rider classification

4th Giro del Medio Brenta
4th Gran Premio Muelas del Pan
6th Overall Tour de l'Avenir
10th Road race, UCI Under-23 Road World Championships
2026
2nd Overall Giro della Valle d'Aosta

1st Points classification
1st Stage 3

2nd Overall Giro Next Gen
4th Overall Tour de l'Avenir
