= 2024 UCI Junior Track Cycling World Championships =

- Venue: Luoyang, China
- Date: 21–25 August
- Velodrome: Luoyang City Sports Center Velodrome

The 2024 UCI Junior Track Cycling World Championships were the 49th annual Junior World Championships for track cycling, held in Luoyang, China from 21 to 25 August.

The Championships had eleven events each for men and women (sprint, points race, individual pursuit, team pursuit, time trial, team sprint, keirin, madison, scratch race, omnium, elimination race).

== Medal summary ==
Event	Gold	Silver	Bronze
Men's events
Sprint	Tayte Ryan; Australia	Norasetthada Bunma; Thailand	Choi Tae-ho; South Korea
Points race	Nicolas Aernouts; Belgium	Lucca Silva; Brazil	Finlay Tarling; United Kingdom
Individual pursuit	Henry Hobbs; United Kingdom	Wil Holmes; Australia	Alessio Magagnotti; Italy
Team pursuit	Ares Costa; Christian Fantini; Alessio Magagnotti; Davide Stella; Eros Sporzon; Italy	Léo Busson; Camille Charret; Ellande Larronde; Lucas Menanteau; France	Sam Fisher; Henry Hobbs; William Salter; Finlay Tarling; Great Britain
Time trial	Tayte Ryan; Australia	Henry Hobbs; United Kingdom	Tomasz Łamaszewski; Poland
Team sprint	Kryštof Friedl; David Peterka; Jan Pořízek; Czech Republic	Feng Yusheng; Li Ruyi; Sun Haoran; Jing Zhen; China	Choi Tae-ho; Jeong Suck-woo; Jung Jae-ho; Jeon Woo-ju; South Korea
Keirin	Fabio Del Medico; Italy	Kanata TakahashiJapan; Daniyar ShayakhmetovKazakhstan	
Madison	Nolan Huysmans; Matijs Van Strijthem; Belgium	Davide Stella; Eros Sporzon; Italy	William Salter; Finlay Tarling; Great Britain
Scratch race	Lucas Menanteau; France	Heimo Fugger; Austria	Nejc Peterlin; Slovenia
Omnium	Matijs Van Strijthem; Belgium	Ashlin Barry; United States	Alexander Hewes; Australia
Elimination race	Davide Stella; Italy	Rubén Sánchez; Spain	Lucas Menanteau; France

Event	Gold	Silver	Bronze
Women's events
Sprint	Stefany Cuadrado; Colombia	Georgette Rand; United Kingdom	Luo Shuyan; China
Individual pursuit	Carys Lloyd; United Kingdom	Lilyth Jones; Australia	Mélanie Dupin; France
Time trial	Stefany Cuadrado; Colombia	Makaira Wallace; Trinidad and Tobago	Luo Shuyan; China
Points race	Imogen Wolff; United Kingdom	Izaro Etxarri; Spain	Judith Rottmann; Germany
Keirin	Stefany Cuadrado; Colombia	Makaira Wallace; Trinidad and Tobago	Matilde Cenci; Italy
Scratch race	Nicole Duncan; Australia	Valentina Ferreyra; Spain	Chantal Pegolo; Italy
Team sprint	Lu Minying; Luo Shuyan; Shi Yi; Wang Rongrong; China	Jodie Blackwood; Riley Faulkner; Caitlin Kelly; New Zealand	Matilde Cenci; Chantal Pegolo; Siria Trevisan; Italy
Team pursuit	Erin Boothman; Cat Ferguson; Carys Lloyd; Imogen Wolff; Great Britain	Elina Cabot; Violette Demay; Mélanie Dupin; Léane Tabu; France	Arianna Giordani; Linda Sanarini; Irma Siri; Asia Sgaravato; Virginia Iaccarino; Italy
Omnium	Cat Ferguson; United Kingdom	Nicole Duncan; Australia	Adelina Sakun; Individual Neutral Athletes
Madison	Erin Boothman; Carys Lloyd; Great Britain	Messane Bräutigam; Judith Rottmann; Germany	Anita Baima; Linda Sanarini; Italy
Elimination race	Messane Bräutigam; Germany	Gabriela Kaczmarczyk; Poland	Anita Baima; Italy

== Medal table ==
* Host nation (China)

Rank	Nation	Gold	Silver	Bronze	Total
1	Great Britain	6	2	3	11
2	Australia	3	3	1	7
3	Italy	3	1	7	11
4	Belgium	3	0	0	3
4	Colombia	3	0	0	3
6	France	1	2	2	5
7	China*	1	1	2	4
8	Germany	1	1	1	3
9	Czech Republic	1	0	0	1
10	Spain	0	3	0	3
11	Trinidad and Tobago	0	2	0	2
12	Poland	0	1	1	2
13	Austria	0	1	0	1
13	Brazil	0	1	0	1
13	Japan	0	1	0	1
13	Kazakhstan	0	1	0	1
13	New Zealand	0	1	0	1
13	Thailand	0	1	0	1
13	United States	0	1	0	1
20	South Korea	0	0	2	2
21	Slovenia	0	0	1	1
–	Individual Neutral Athletes	0	0	1	1
Totals (21 entries)		22	23	21	66
