= Marith Vanhove =

Belgian cyclist (born 2003)

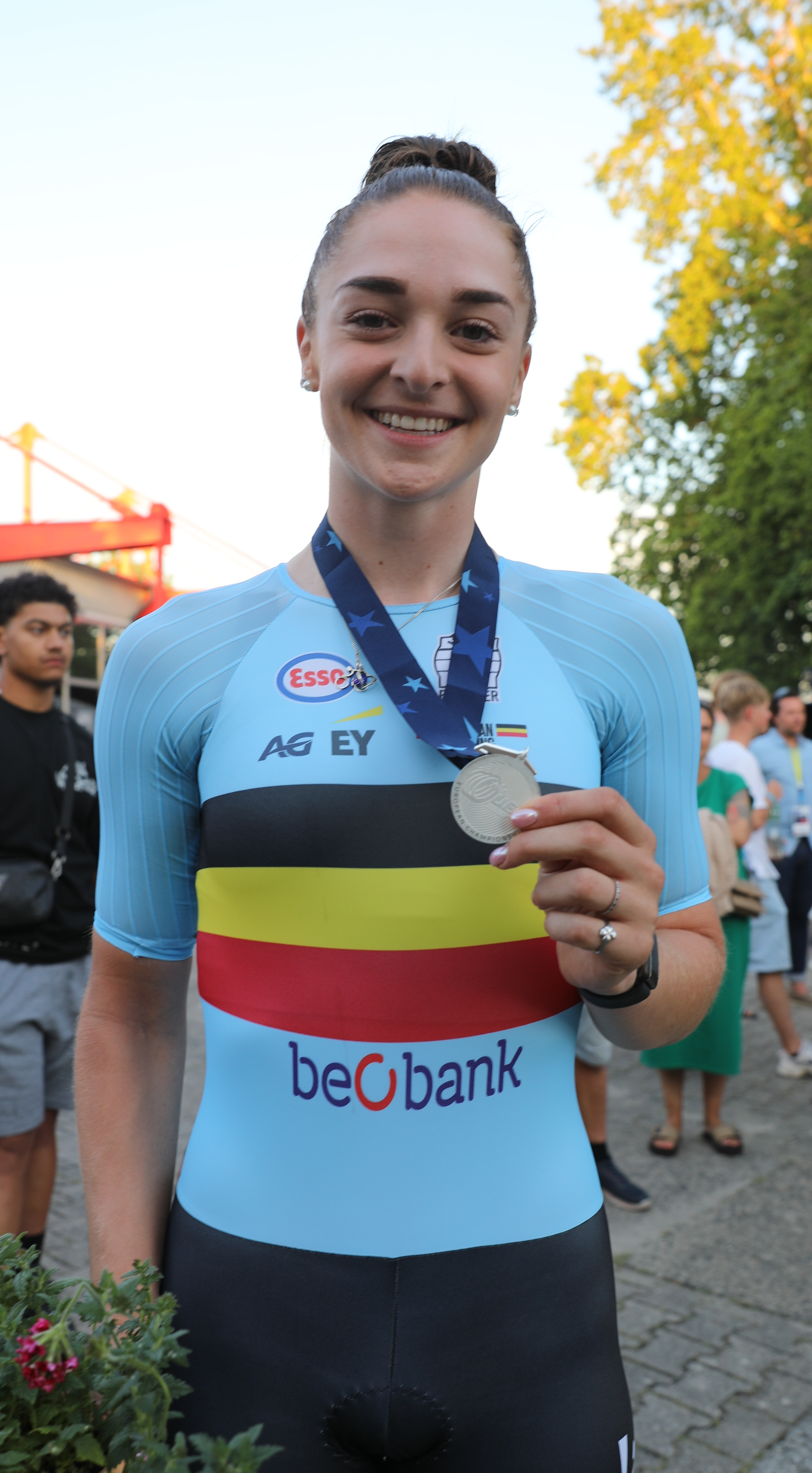
- Vanhove at the 2024 UEC European Track Championships (under-23 & junior)

Personal information
- Born: 7 March 2003 (age 23)

Cycling career
- Sport: Cycling
- Current team: AG Insurance Soudal Devo Team
- Disciplines: Road; Track
- Role: Rider

Professional teams
- 2022–2024: Parkhotel Valkenburg
- 2025–2026: AG Insurance Soudal Devo Team
- 2027-2028: Ma Petite Entreprise
Medal record
Representing Belgium
Women's track cycling
World Junior Championships
Silver medal – second place	2021 Cairo	Scratch race
European Junior Championships
Gold medal – first place	2020 Fiorenzuola d'Arda	500m time trial
Gold medal – first place	2020 Fiorenzuola d'Arda	Madison
Silver medal – second place	2021 Apeldoorn	Scratch race
Bronze medal – third place	2021 Apeldoorn	Individual pursuit
European Under-23 Championships
Silver medal – second place	2023 Anadia	Madison
Silver medal – second place	2024 Cottbus	Omnium
Bronze medal – third place	2025 Anadia	Team pursuit
Bronze medal – third place	2025 Anadia	Madison
Women's road cycling
European Junior Championships
Silver medal – second place	2020 Plouay	Road race

Marith Vanhove (born 7 March 2003) is a Belgian professional cyclist who rides for AG Insurance–Soudal's development team. Vanhove competes in track and road cycling.

== Career ==
In 2020, Vanhove won the prestigious Watersley Challenge junior stage race, winning the second stage and finishing top-3 in the other two.

In January 2025, Vanhove briefly held the world record for the women's 1 kilometer time trial on the track, with a time of 1:07.287, after the standard distance was extended from 500 meters. With her time, she also became Belgian champion at the event.

At the 2026 Trofee Maarten Wynants, Vanhove's team dominated the race, with her teammate Gladys Verhulst-Wild and Vanhove finishing first and second respectively.

On October 1, 2026 it was announced that Vanhove would join the UCI ProTeam, Ma Petite Enterprise, in 2027 on a two year contract.

== Major results ==
=== Road ===
2020
2nd Road race, European Junior Championships
2nd Road race, National Junior Championships
2021
National Junior Championships

1st Road race
2nd Time trial

7th Road race, UCI World Junior Championships
2024
5th Drentse Acht van Westerveld
10th Ronde de Mouscron
2025
8th Scheldeprijs
10th Argenta Classic - Deurne
2026
1st Grote Prijs CHW Beveren
2nd Trofee Maarten Wynants
