= Ffos-y-ffin =

Village in Ceredigion, Wales

Coordinates: 52.2206°N 4.2746°W

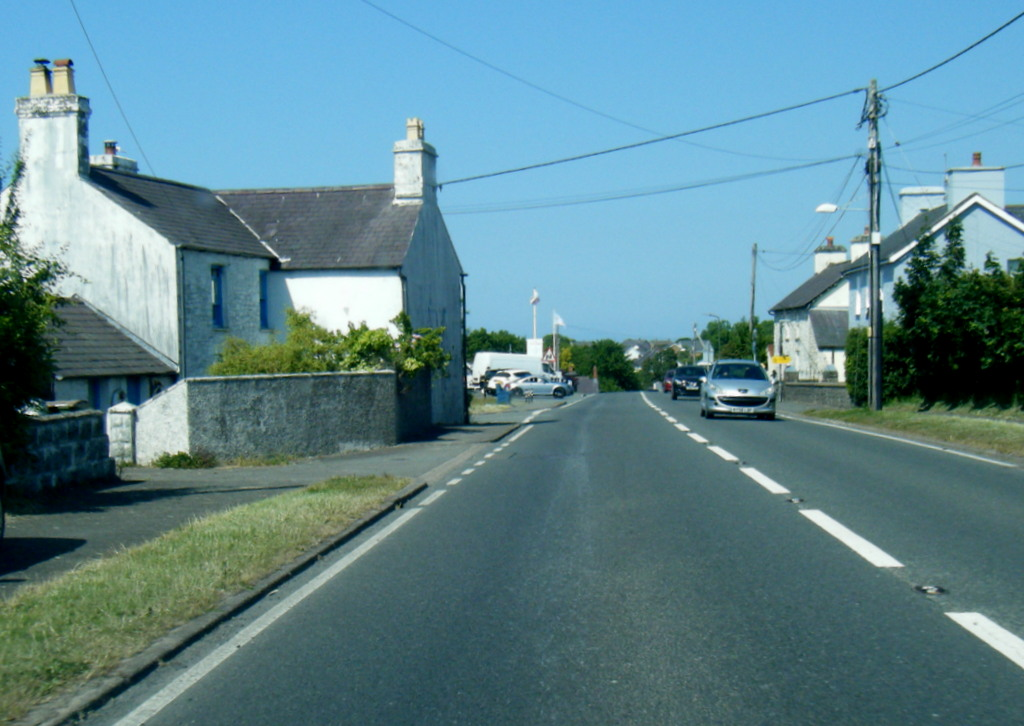
Ffos-y-ffin in 2023

Ffos-y-ffin is a village near Aberaeron, Wales. The village is situated in Ceredigion, west Wales, and the historic county of Cardiganshire. With a population of approximately 200 residents, it serves as a small rural community offering scenic views across Cardigan Bay and access to the Ceredigion Coast Path.

== Description ==
Ffos-y-ffin is a linear roadside village in the county of Ceredigion, west Wales, straddling the A487 3 km south-west of Aberaeron at National Grid reference SN 446,600. The Welsh Language Commissioner records the standard form as Ffos-y-ffin—literally 'boundary ditch'—a topographical allusion to an early field dyke still visible from the bridge at the village centre. Historical notes compiled by the Ceredigion Historical Society place the settlement on the former Cardiganshire turnpike between Aberaeron and Llwyncelyn, with scattered nineteenth-century cottages later consolidated by ribbon housing in the 1960s and 1980s.

Sheltered by low coastal hills, the village looks across grazed salt meadows to Cardigan Bay. The roadside lay-by above the marsh is promoted in local tourism guides as a reliable vantage point for watching wild red kites that patrol the Aeron valley; dolphin and seal sightings are frequent off the nearby shore. The birdlife, coupled with the sweeping sea views, makes this short stretch of the A487 a favourite stopping-place on the scenic route between Aberystwyth and Cardigan.

Amenities are modest but communal. A convenience store and petrol filling station stand at the north end, while the two-hundred-year-old Red Lion Inn occupies the former coaching site beside the ditch. Reopened after renovation in 2023, the inn offers Welsh real ales and step-free access, earning a full entry in CAMRA's regional pub guide. Frequent T5 TrawsCymru buses stop at 'Ffos-y-ffin Cross', linking the village with Aberystwyth to the north, New Quay and Cardigan to the south-west, and providing onward connections to Haverfordwest. Footpaths from the A487 descend through grazed pasture to the Aeron estuary and the Ceredigion Coast Path, integrating Ffos-y-ffin into the county's wider network of walking and cycling routes.
