= Davide Stella =

Italian cyclist

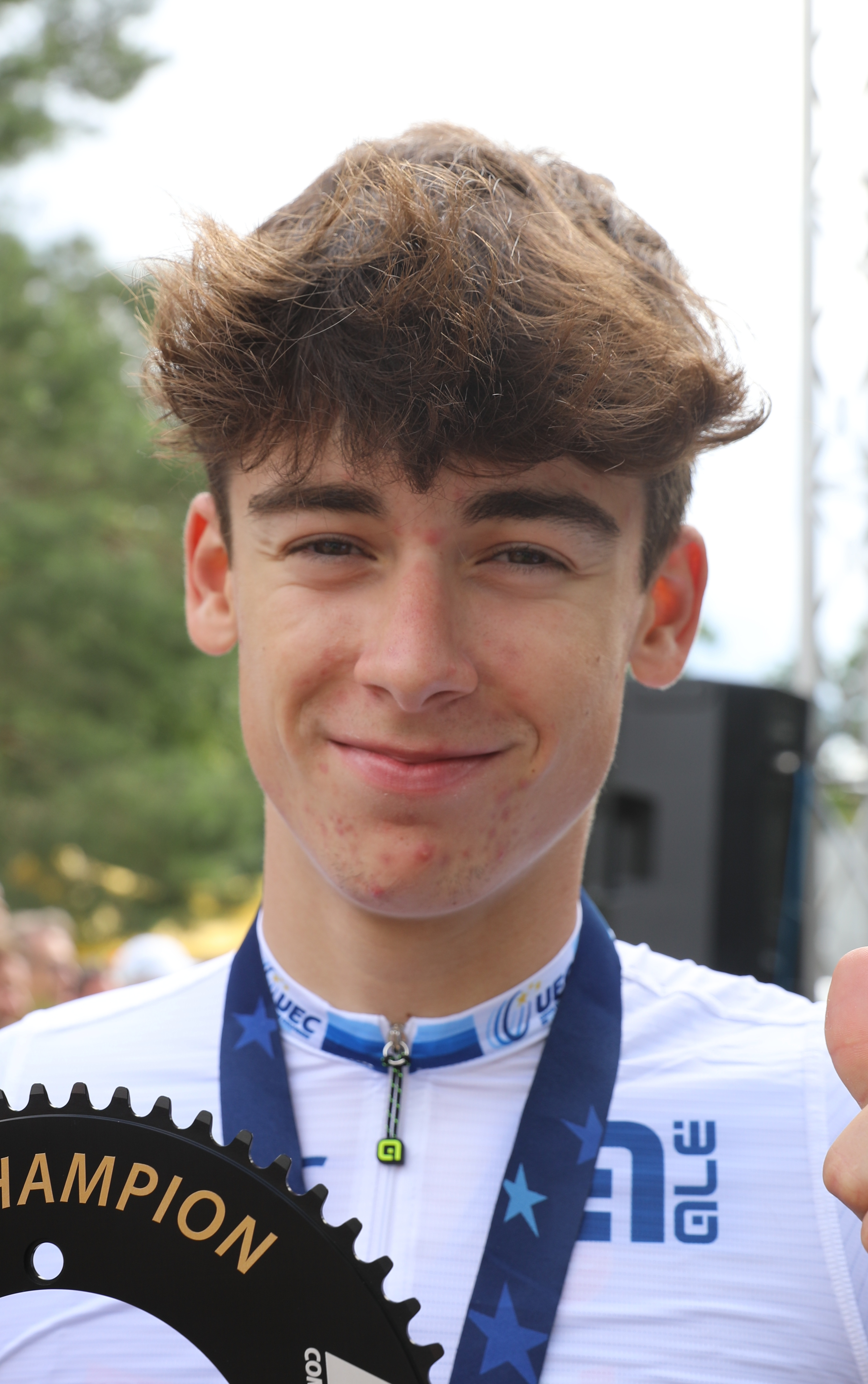
- Stella in 2024

Personal information
- Born: 14 April 2006 (age 20) Monfalcone, Italy

Cycling career
- Sport: Cycling
- Current team: UAE Team Emirates Gen Z
- Disciplines: Road; Track
- Role: Rider
- Rider type: Sprinter (road)

Amateur team
- 2023–2024: Gottardo Giochi Caneva

Professional teams
- 2025–2026: UAE Team Emirates Gen Z
- 2027–: UAE Team Emirates XRG
Medal record
Representing Italy
Men's track cycling
World Junior Championships
Gold medal – first place	2024 Luoyang	Elimination
Gold medal – first place	2024 Luoyang	Team pursuit
Silver medal – second place	2024 Luoyang	Madison
Bronze medal – third place	2023 Cali	Elimination
European Under-23 Championships
Gold medal – first place	2025 Anadia	Scratch
Silver medal – second place	2026 Cottbus	Omnium
European Junior Championships
Gold medal – first place	2023 Anadia	Scratch
Gold medal – first place	2023 Anadia	Elimination
Gold medal – first place	2023 Anadia	Kilometer
Gold medal – first place	2024 Cottbus	Team pursuit
Gold medal – first place	2024 Cottbus	Madison
Silver medal – second place	2024 Cottbus	Scratch

Davide Stella (born 14 April 2006) is an Italian professional cyclist who rides for UCI Continental team UAE Team Emirates Gen Z. In 2027, he will join UCI WorldTeam UAE Team Emirates XRG.

== Major results ==
=== Road ===
2024
1st Coppa San Vito
6th Liberazione Juniores
2025
1st Stage 5 Sharjah Tour
1st Stage 2 Volta ao Alentejo
2026
1st Stage 3 Tour de l'Avenir
1st Stage 4 Volta a Portugal do Futuro
