= 2026 Tour of Bruges Women =

Cycling race

2026 Tour of Bruges
2026 UCI Women's World Tour, race 8 of 26

Race details
- Dates: 26 March 2026
- Stages: 1
- Distance: 143.7 km (89.3 mi)
- Winning time: 3h 31' 23"

Results
	Winner	Carys Lloyd (GBR)	(Movistar Team)
	Second	Elisa Balsamo (ITA)	(Lidl–Trek)
	Third	Nienke Veenhoven (NED)	(Lidl–Trek)

The 2026 Tour of Bruges was a Belgian road cycling one-day race that took place on 26 March. It was the 9th edition of the Tour of Bruges and the 8th event of the 2026 UCI Women's World Tour. The race was won by British rider Carys Lloyd of Movistar Team, winning in a sprint finish. It was Lloyd's first professional victory, and her first win in the UCI Women's World Tour.

== Teams ==
Nineteen teams took part in the event, including fourteen UCI Women's WorldTeams, four UCI Women's ProTeams and one Women's continental team.

UCI Women's WorldTeams

- Team SD Worx–Protime
- Lidl–Trek
- Canyon//SRAM Zondacrypto
- AG Insurance–Soudal
- EF Education–Oatly
- FDJ United–Suez
- Fenix–Premier Tech
- Human Powered Health
- Liv AlUla Jayco
- Movistar Team
- Team Picnic–PostNL
- Visma–Lease a Bike
- UAE Team ADQ
- Uno-X Mobility

UCI Women's ProTeams

- Laboral Kutxa–Fundación Euskadi
- Lotto–Intermarché Ladies
- St. Michel–Preference Home–Auber93
- VolkerWessels Women Cyclingteam

UCI Women's Continental Teams

- Citymesh–Customm Pro Cycling Team

== Result ==
Result
Rank	Rider	Team	Time
1	Carys Lloyd (GBR)	Movistar Team	3h 31' 23"
2	Elisa Balsamo (ITA)	Lidl–Trek	+ 0"
3	Nienke Veenhoven (NED)	Visma–Lease a Bike	+ 0"
4	Chiara Consonni (ITA)	Canyon//SRAM Zondacrypto	+ 0"
5	Shari Bossuyt (BEL)	AG Insurance–Soudal	+ 0"
6	Lara Gillespie (IRL)	UAE Team ADQ	+ 0"
7	Katrijn De Clercq (BEL)	Lotto–Intermarché Ladies	+ 0"
8	Marjolein van 't Geloof (NED)	Laboral Kutxa–Fundación Euskadi	+ 0"
9	Lorena Wiebes (NED)	Team SD Worx–Protime	+ 0"
10	Alexandra Volstad (CAN)	EF Education–Oatly	+ 0"
