= Rubén Sánchez (cyclist) =

Spanish cyclist (born 2006)

Ruben Sanchez
Personal information
- Born: 3 January 2006 (age 20)

Cycling career
- Sport: Cycling
- Current team: Hagens Berman Jayco
- Disciplines: Road; Track
- Role: Rider

Amateur team
- 2023–2024: BathCo

Professional team
- 2025–: Hagens Berman Jayco
Medal record
Men's track cycling
Representing Spain
World Junior Championships
Gold medal – first place	2023 Cali	Elimination race
Silver medal – second place	2024 Luoyang	Elimination race

Rubén Sánchez Cordoba (born 3 January 2006) is a Spanish cyclist who rides for UCI Continental team Hagens Berman Jayco.

== Career ==
He won the men's junior road race at the Spanish national championships in 2022. He won gold at the 2023 UCI Junior Track Cycling World Championships in the Elimination race, In doing so, he became the first Spanish cyclist to win a junior world championship in a track event. He won the silver medal in the same race in 2024. He won gold in the elimination race at the 2024 UEC European Junior Track Championships in Cottbus. In November 2024, he signed for UCI Continental team Hagens Berman Jayco.
