= Georgette Rand =

British track cyclist

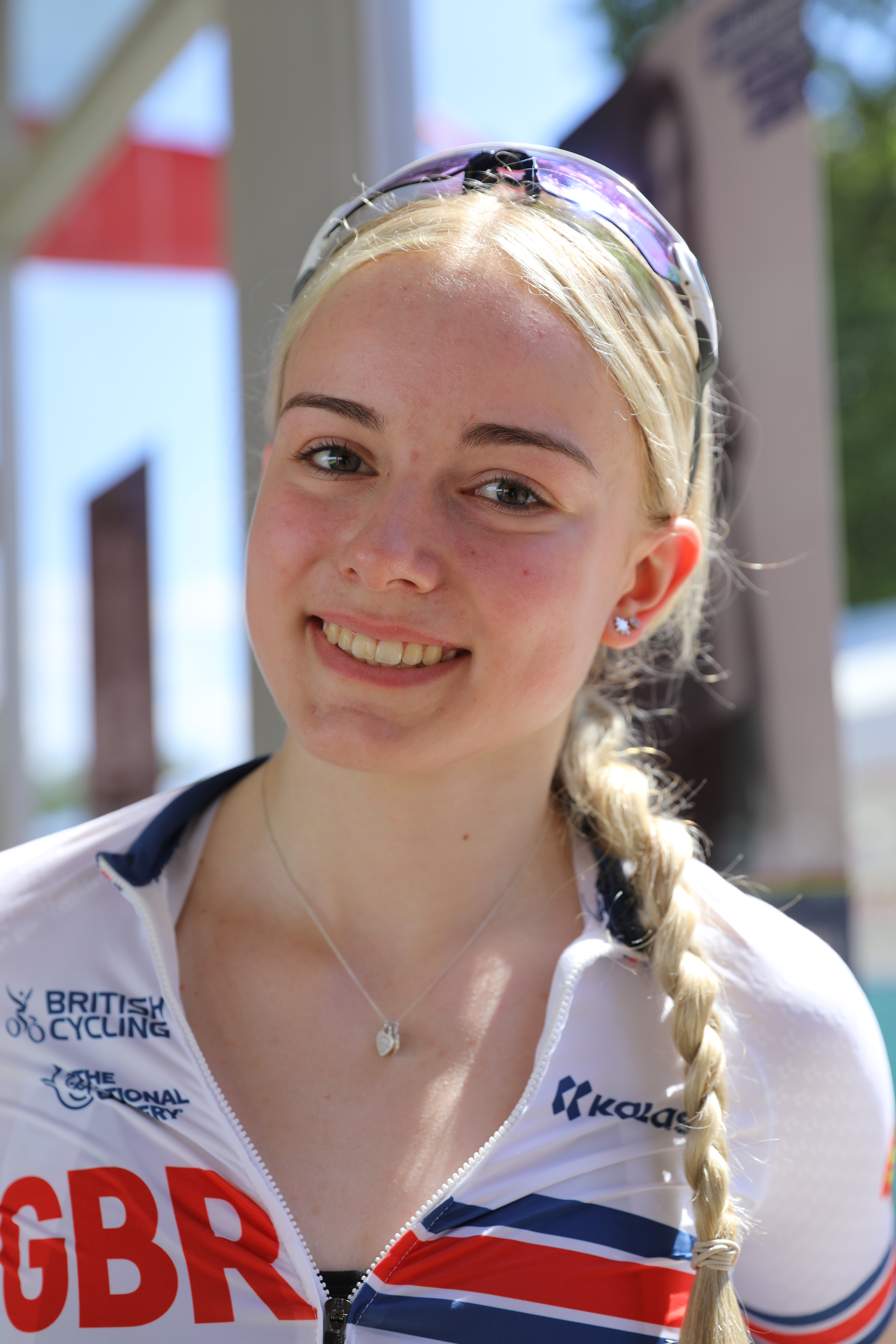
- Rand in 2024

Personal information
- Born: 1 January 2006 (age 20)

Cycling career
- Sport: Cycling
- Discipline: Track
- Role: Rider
- Rider type: Sprinter
Medal record
Women's track cycling
Representing Great Britain
European U23 Track Championships
Silver medal – second place	2025 Anadia	Team sprint
World Junior Championships
Silver medal – second place	2024 Luoyang	Sprint
European Junior Championships
Gold medal – first place	2023 Anadia	Team sprint
Gold medal – first place	2023 Anadia	500m TT
Gold medal – first place	2024 Cottbus	Team sprint
Gold medal – first place	2024 Cottbus	Sprint
Gold medal – first place	2024 Cottbus	500m TT
Bronze medal – third place	2023 Anadia	Sprint

Georgette Rand (born 1 January 2006) is a British track cyclist who competes in sprint events. A multiple-time gold medalist at the European Junior Track Championships, she was a silver medalist at the 2024 UCI Junior Track Cycling World Championships in the women's individual sprint.

== Career ==
A member of Velo Club, Lincoln, Rand won gold medals in the team sprint and 500 metres time trial, and won a bronze medal in the individual sprint, at the 2023 UEC European Junior Track Championship in Anadia, Portugal. That year, Rand won three sprint titles at the British Junior Track Championships in Newport, Wales, winning the women's 500 metres time-trial, the sprint, and the keirin.

As an 18-year-old in February 2024, she was part of the winning women's team sprint at the 2024 British Cycling National Track Championships, riding alongside Emma Finucane, Sophie Capewell and Milly Tanner, with Finucane sitting out the final. In July 2024, Rand won three gold medals at the 2024 UEC European Junior Track Championships in Cottbus, Germany, winning the sprint, keirin, and 500 metres time trial disciples. Rand won the silver medal in the women's sprint at the 2024 UCI Junior Track Cycling World Championships in China, finishing behind Stefany Cuadrado of Colombia.

In February 2025, she was runner-up in the team sprint at the 2025 British Track Championships, riding alongside Iona Moir and Rhianna Parris-Smith. At the 2025 U23 UEC European Track Championships she won a silver medal in the women's team sprint alongside teammates Iona Moir and Rhian Edmunds.
