= Ugo Fabries =

French cyclist (born 2005)

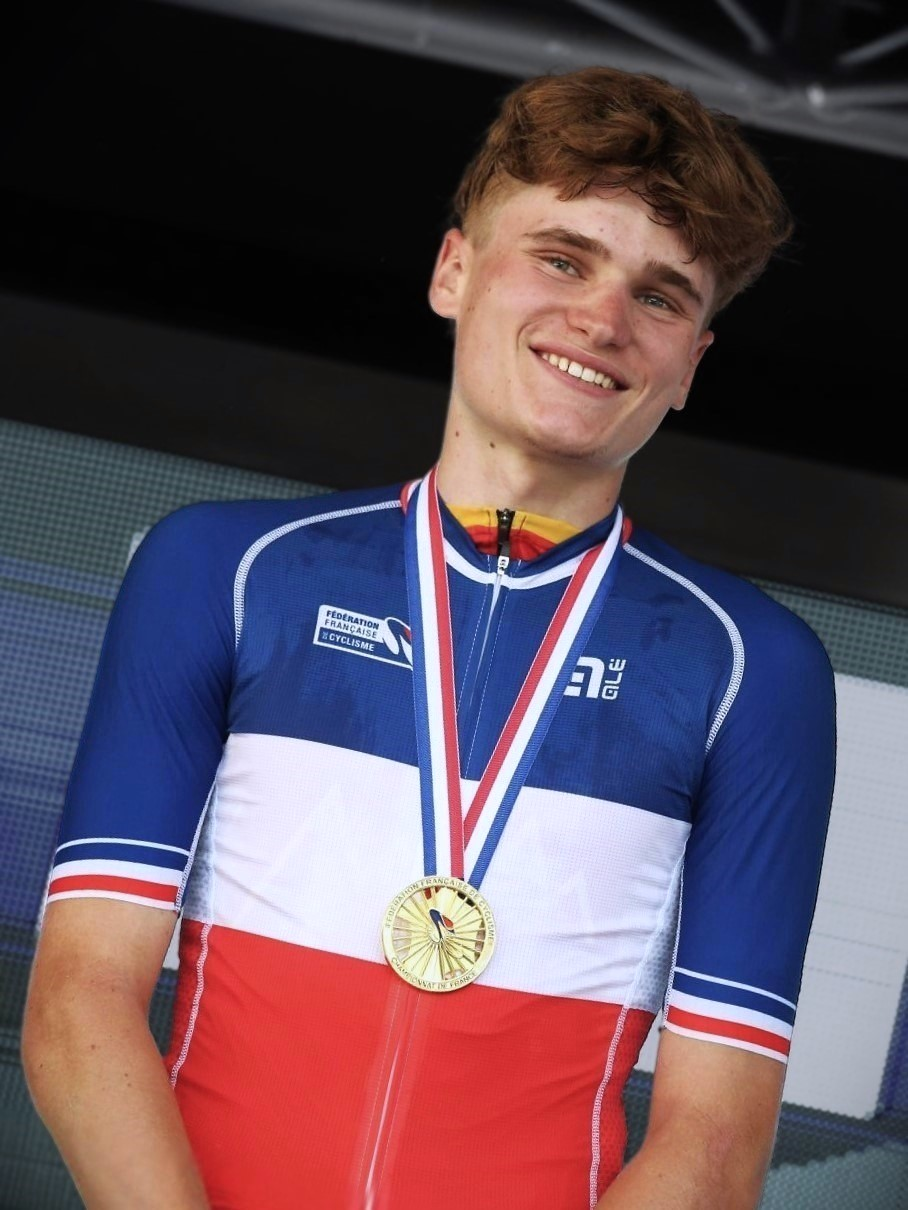

Personal information
- Nicknames: Fabrice, Fabrizio
- Born: 3 August 2005 (age 21) Toulouse, France

Cycling career
- Sport: Cycling
- Current team: UAE Team Emirates Gen Z
- Discipline: Road
- Role: Rider

Amateur team
- 2022–2023: Team 31 Jolly Cycles

Professional teams
- 2024: Trinity Racing
- 2025–2026: UAE Team Emirates Gen Z
- 2027-: Team Jayco–AlUla

Ugo Fabries (born 3 August 2005) is a French cyclist, who currently rides for UCI Continental team UAE Team Emirates Gen Z.

== Early life ==
Fabries was raised in Frouzins. Early on he tried his hand at both road cycling and cyclo-cross.

In 2022 for the junior ranks, just like many promising riders around Toulouse, he joined the local Team 31 Jolly Cycles run by Michel Puntous.

In May of that same year, Fabries was called up to race with the national squad.

In June 2023, he became the junior Occitanie Champion, winning solo.

== Career ==
After two years of big opportunities and illness, Ugo Fabries signed with Trinity Sports Management as well as his first Under-23 contract with the British UCI Continental Team Trinity Racing.

In March 2024, after a team training camp, Fabries was thrown into his first U23 race at Youngster Coast Challenge.

Two days later, Fabries would line up across the border at Dorpenomloop Rucphen. He punctured out of the leadout.

In the middle of 2024, Trinity Racing told the press they would close down their road team at the end of the season. In the meantime Fabries crashed out of Tour Alsace with a broken collarbone.

In late 2024, UAE Team Emirates announced the signing of Ugo Fabries as part of their development program.

In August 2025, he became the French under-23 road race champion, winning solo.

In August 2026, Fabries was a major figure of the Tour de l'Avenir, with a notable second place in the uphill time trial behind the overall winner Lorenzo Finn.

Embracing being a french rider through the international scene, this helped land him his first World Tour deal with the australian outfit Jayco-AlUla in 2027. This signing effectively makes Ugo Fabries the first ever french rider of the team.

== Major results ==
2022
4th La Classique des Alpes Juniors
4th GP Plouay Juniors
2023
2nd Grand Prix de la Tomate
2025
1st Road race, National Under-23 Road Championships
7th Overall Orlen Nations Grand Prix
9th Overall Istrian Spring Tour
2026
3rd Overall Volta ao Alentejo

1st Young rider classification

6th Overall Tour de l'Avenir
