= Marcos Freire =

Spanish cyclist (born 2006)

Personal information
- Born: 16 July 2006 (age 20) Sorengo, Switzerland

Cycling career
- Sport: Cycling
- Current team: UAE Team Emirates Gen Z
- Discipline: Road
- Role: Rider

Amateur team
- 2023–2024: Bathco Cycling Team

Professional teams
- 2025: UAE Team Emirates Gen Z
- 2025: UAE Team Emirates XRG

Marcos Freire Cobo (born 16 July 2006) is a Spanish cyclist, who currently rides for UCI Continental team UAE Team Emirates Gen Z. He is the son of Óscar Freire.

== Career ==
He rode in 2023 and 2024 with the BathCo Cycling team, winning eight races in 2024 in his age category: the Tabira Saria, the Gran Premio El Baruco - Ayuntamiento de Camargo, the Memorial Chele Campos, the Cantabria Time Trial Championship, the Vicente López Carril Trophy, two stages in the Vuelta Ciclista a Valladolid Junior and the Escalante Circuit.

He joined UCI Continental team UAE Team Emirates Gen Z for the 2025 season. However, he also made his debut for the UCI WorldTeam UAE Team Emirates XRG at the Vuelta a Mallorca in 2025. In 2026, his performances included two top-ten finishes at stages of the Volta a Portugal do Futuro, including a second place finish on stage three. Freire signed for Caja Rural-Alea, the development team of Caja Rural–Seguros RGA, prior to the start of the 2027 season.

== Personal life ==
Born in Switzerland, he is the son of Spanish former world champion cyclist Óscar Freire.
