= UAE Team Emirates Gen Z =

Emirati cycling team

Team information
- UCI code: UAZ
- Registered: United Arab Emirates
- Founded: 2024
- Discipline: Road
- Status: UCI Continental

Key personnel
- General manager: Joxean Fernández
- Team manager: Jan Polanc

Team name history
- 2024–: UAE Team Emirates Gen Z

UAE Team Emirates Gen Z is an Emirati UCI Continental cycling team that was founded in 2024. It acts as the development program for UCI WorldTeam UAE Team Emirates XRG.

== Team roster ==
As of 1 September 2025.

Rider	Date of birth
Mohammad Almutaiwei (UAE)	20 November 2003 (age 22)
Ugo Fabries (FRA)	3 August 2005 (age 21)
Marcos Freire (ESP)	16 July 2006 (age 20)
Luca Giaimi (ITA)	12 January 2005 (age 21)
Abdulla Jasim Al-Ali (UAE)	17 January 2003 (age 23)
Duarte Marivoet (BEL)	2 February 2005 (age 21)
Adrià Pericas (ESP)	26 May 2006 (age 20)

Rider	Date of birth
Mateo Ramírez (Note: Joined on 1 June.) (ECU)	9 March 2006 (age 20)
Anže Ravbar (SLO)	11 May 2005 (age 21)
Enea Sambinello (ITA)	9 February 2006 (age 20)
Matthias Schwarzbacher (SVK)	22 December 2005 (age 20)
Gibbe Staes (BEL)	9 October 2005 (age 20)
Davide Stella (ITA)	14 April 2006 (age 20)

== Major wins ==
2024
Overall Tour of Sharjah, Gal Glivar

Stage 3 (ITT), Gal Glivar

Giro del Belvedere, Gal Glivar
United Arab Emirates National Under-23 Road Race, Mohammad Almutaiwei
United Arab Emirates National Time Trial, Abdulla Sultan Alhammadi
United Arab Emirates National Under-23 Time Trial, Abdulla Jasim Al-Ali
Slovenia National Under-23 Time Trial, Gal Glivar
Stage 5 Giro della Valle d'Aosta, Pablo Torres
2025
Stage 5 Tour of Sharjah, Davide Stella
Stage 5 Tour du Rwanda, Duarte Marivoet
Trofej Umag, Matthias Schwarzbacher
Stage 2 Istrian Spring Trophy, Adrià Pericas
Clássica da Arrábida, Luca Giaimi
Stage 2 Volta ao Alentejo, Davide Stella
Stage 5 Volta ao Alentejo, Luca Giaimi
United Arab Emirates National Time Trial, Abdulla Jasim Al-Ali
United Arab Emirates National Under-23 Time Trial, Mohammad Almutaiwei
United Arab Emirates National Under-23 Road Race, Mohammad Almutaiwei
Stage 1 (ITT) Giro Next Gen, Matthias Schwarzbacher
Slovakia National Time Trial, Matthias Schwarzbacher
2026
Clássica da Arrábida, Enea Sambinello

== National & continental champions ==
2024
Emirati Under-23 Road Race, Mohammad Almutaiwei
Emirati Time Trial, Abdulla Sultan Alhammadi
Emirati Under-23 Time Trial, Abdulla Jasim Al-Ali
Asian Under-23 Road Race, Abdulla Jasim Al-Ali
Slovenian Under-23 Time Trial, Gal Glivar
2025
Asian Under-23 Time Trial, Mohammad Almutaiwei
Emirati Time Trial, Abdulla Jasim Al-Ali
Emirati Under-23 Time Trial, Mohammad Almutaiwei
Emirati Under-23 Road Race, Mohammad Almutaiwei
Slovakian Time Trial, Matthias Schwarzbacher
