= Ceredigion (journal) =

Welsh local history journal

Ceredigion is an annual local history journal about the history of the county of Ceredigion, Wales, published by Ceredigion Historical Society.

The society was founded, as Cardiganshire Antiquarian Association, 1911 to promote the understanding of the history and archaeology of the county. In 2002 it became Ceredigion Historical Society. The Society started to publish Transactions and Archaeological Record of the Cardiganshire Antiquarian Society in 1913; it ceased in 1938.

In 1951 Ceredigion: Journal of the Cardiganshire Antiquarian Society started. In 2002 it was renamed Ceredigion: Journal of Ceredigion Historical Society. It contains historical articles and book reviews. It is mostly in English but there is some Welsh-language content.

It has been digitised by the Welsh Journals Online project at the National Library of Wales.
