= 2023 UEC European Track Championships (under-23 & junior) =

Track cycling championship

- Venue: Anadia
- Date: 11–16 July
- Velodrome: Velódromo Nacional Sangalhos

The 2023 UEC European Track Championships (under-23 & junior) were the 23nd continental championships for European under-23 and junior track cyclists, and the 14th since the event was renamed following the reorganisation of European track cycling in 2010. As in 2022, the event took place at the Velódromo Nacional Sangalhos in Anadia, Portugal from 11 to 16 July 2023.

== Medal summary ==
=== Under-23 ===
Event	Gold		Silver		Bronze	
Men's events
Sprint	Mattia Predomo; Italy		Tijmen van Loon; Netherlands		Hayden Norris; Great Britain	
Team sprint	Italy; Matteo Bianchi; Mattia Predomo; Matteo Tugnolo; Stefano Minuta	43.990	Netherlands; Loris Leneman; Daan Kool; Tijmen van Loon; Lars Romijn	44.391	Germany; Willy Weinrich; Henrik Hackmann; Luca Spiegel; Paul Groß	44.300
1 km time trial	Matteo Bianchi; Italy	1:00.283	Willy Weinrich; Germany	1:00.824	Daan Kool; Netherlands	1:01.023
Keirin	Matteo Bianchi; Italy		Konstantinos Livanos; Greece		Tijmen van Loon; Netherlands	
Individual pursuit	Noah Vandenbranden; Belgium	4:10.537	Josh Charlton; Great Britain	4:11.732	Joshua Tarling; Great Britain	4:09.527
Team pursuit	Great Britain; Josh Charlton; Joshua Giddings; Noah Hobbs; Joshua Tarling; Jack Brough	3:51.217	Italy; Samuel Quaranta; Niccolò Galli; Bryan Olivo; Mattia Pinazzi; Alessio Delle Vedove	3:54.222	Belgium; Thibaut Bernard; Brem Deman; Gianluca Pollefliet; Noah Vandenbranden	3:54.739
Points race	Noah Vandenbranden; Belgium	49 pts	Niccolò Galli; Italy	41 pts ^{FO:2}	Maximilian Schmidbauer; Austria	41 pts ^{FO:3}
Scratch	Phillip Mathiesen; Denmark		Diogo Narciso; Portugal		Elmar Abma; Netherlands	
Madison	Austria; Maximilian Schmidbauer; Raphael Kokas	68 pts	Belgium; Gianluca Pollefliet; Noah Vandenbranden	61 pts	Germany; Benjamin Boos; Tim Torn Teutenberg	51 pts
Omnium	Tim Torn Teutenberg; Germany	142 pts	Tim Wafler; Austria	118 pts	Elmar Abma; Netherlands	113 pts
Elimination race	Tim Torn Teutenberg; Germany		Gianluca Pollefliet; Belgium		Elmar Abma; Netherlands	
Women's events
Sprint	Alessa-Catriona Propster; Germany		Emma Finucane; Great Britain		Clara Schneider; Germany	
Team sprint	Great Britain; Rhian Edmunds; Iona Moir; Rhianna Parris-Smith	49.028	Czechia; Anna Jaborníková; Veronika Jaborníková; Natálie Mikšaníková; Sára Peterková	49.559	Poland; Nikola Seremak; Natalia Wężyk; Nikola Wielowska	49.359
500 m time trial	Rhianna Parris-Smith; Great Britain	34.129	Julie Nicolaes; Belgium	34.335	Clara Schneider; Germany	34.392
Keirin	Clara Schneider; Germany		Veronika Jaborníková; Czech Republic		Alla Biletska; Ukraine	
Individual pursuit	Kate Richardson; Great Britain	3:31.962	Olga Wankiewicz; Poland	3:33.576	Leila Gschwentner; Austria	3:33.825
Team pursuit	Great Britain; Madelaine Leech; Sophie Lewis; Grace Lister; Kate Richardson	4:22.087	France; Heïdi Gaugain; Constance Marchand; Aurore Pernollet; Clémence Chéreau; Lara Lallemant	4:28.833	Italy; Valentina Basilico; Sofia Collinelli; Sara Fiorin; Matilde Vitillo; Lara Crestanello	4:25.912
Points race	Lara Gillespie; Ireland	49 pts	Maike van der Duin; Netherlands	42 pts	Tetiana Yashchenko; Ukraine	31 pts
Scratch	Maja Tracka; Poland		Flora Perkins; Great Britain		Constance Marchand; France	
Madison	Great Britain; Madelaine Leech; Sophie Lewis	48 pts	Belgium; Marith Vanhove; Katrijn De Clercq	19 pts	Spain; Eva Anguela; Isabella Escalera	12 pts
Omnium	Lara Gillespie; Ireland	126 pts	Katrijn De Clercq; Belgium	118 pts	Maike van der Duin; Netherlands	117 pts
Elimination race	Maike van der Duin; Netherlands		Katrijn De Clercq; Belgium		Nora Tveit; Norway	

=== Junior ===
Event	Gold		Silver		Bronze	
Men's events
Sprint	Pete-Collin Flemming; Germany		Oliver Pettifer; Great Britain		Etienne Oliviero; France	
Team sprint	Germany; Pete-Collin Flemming; Colin Rudolph; Jakob Vogt	44.966	France; Antoine Capelle; Etienne Oliviero; Matthias Sylvanise	46.139	Belgium; Nicolas Aernouts; Tjorven Mertens; Yeno Vingerhoets	47.314
1 km time trial	Davide Stella; Italy	1:02.448	Nolan Huysmans; Belgium	1:02.449	Jakob Vogt; Germany	1:02.461
Keirin	Pete-Collin Flemming; Germany		Tjorven Mertens; Belgium		Etienne Oliviero; France	
Individual pursuit	Luca Giaimi; Italy	3:07.596; JWR	Matthew Brennan; Great Britain	3:09.161	Ben Wiggins; Great Britain	3:12.965
Team pursuit	Italy; Renato Favero; Matteo Fiorin; Luca Giaimi; Juan David Sierra	3:53.980; JWR	Great Britain; Matthew Brennan; Jed Smithson; Luke Tarling; Ben Wiggins	4:00.540	Denmark; Jonathan Hansen; Conrad Haugsted; August Hundt; Noah Andersen	4:00.656
Points race	Juan David Sierra; Italy	70 pts	Patryk Goszczurny; Poland	39 pts	Ramazan Yılmaz; Turkey	30 pts
Scratch	Davide Stella; Italy		Ramazan Yılmaz; Turkey		Pablo Laruelle; France	
Madison	Italy; Matteo Fiorin; Juan David Sierra	43 pts	Great Britain; Ben Wiggins; Matthew Brennan	34 pts	Belgium; Tom Crabbe; Milan Van den Haute	27 pts
Omnium	Héctor Álvarez; Spain	147 pts	Matteo Fiorin; Italy	143 pts	Dawid Łątkowski; Poland	142 pts
Elimination race	Davide Stella; Italy		Žak Eržen; Slovenia		Collin Westbroek; Netherlands	
Women's events
Sprint	Karolina Keliukh; Ukraine		Marie-Louisa Drouode; France		Georgette Rand; Great Britain	
Team sprint	Great Britain; Sarah Johnson; Georgette Rand; Anna Whitworth Hay	50.534	Germany; Anastasia Kuniß; Bente Lürmann; Anne Slosharek	51.373	Italy; Beatrice Bertolini; Vittoria Grassi; Carola Ratti	52.186
500 m time trial	Georgette Rand; Great Britain	35.520	Marie-Louisa Drouode; France	35.687	Bente Lürmann; Germany	35.895
Keirin	Beatrice Bertolini; Italy		Marie-Louisa Drouode; France		Anna Whitworth Hay; Great Britain	
Individual pursuit	Federica Venturelli; Italy	2:18.432	Hélène Hesters; Belgium	2:20.981	Alice Toniolli; Italy	2:21.409
Team pursuit	Italy; Irma Siri; Alice Toniolli; Silvia Milesi; Federica Venturelli; Elisa Tottolo	4:26.834	France; Violette Demay; Mélanie Dupin; Léonie Mahieu; Léane Tabu	4:27.136	Great Britain; Cat Ferguson; Ella Jamieson; Isobel Lloyd; Isabel Sharp; Holly Ramsey	4:27.267
Points race	Seana Littbarski-Gray; Germany	38 pts	Léane Tabu; France	31 pts	Patrícia Duarte; Portugal	22 pts
Scratch	Magdalena Fuchs; Germany		Vittoria Grassi; Italy		Laerke Expeels; Belgium	
Madison	Great Britain; Isobel Lloyd; Isabel Sharp	29 pts	Belgium; Laerke Expeels; Hélène Hesters	25 pts	Germany; Messane Bräutigam; Seana Littbarski-Gray	23 pts
Omnium	Hélène Hesters; Belgium	139 pts	Cat Ferguson; Great Britain	131 pts	Clémence Chéreau; France	130 pts
Elimination race	Hélène Hesters; Belgium		Anita Baima; Italy		Sina Temmen; Germany	

== Medal table ==
* Host nation (Portugal)

Rank	Nation	Gold	Silver	Bronze	Total
1	Italy	14	5	3	22
2	Great Britain	9	8	6	23
3	Germany	9	2	8	19
4	Belgium	4	10	4	18
5	Ireland	2	0	0	2
6	Netherlands	1	3	7	11
7	Poland	1	2	2	5
8	Austria	1	1	2	4
9	Ukraine	1	0	2	3
10	Denmark	1	0	1	2
10	Spain	1	0	1	2
12	France	0	7	5	12
13	Czech Republic	0	2	0	2
14	Portugal*	0	1	1	2
14	Turkey	0	1	1	2
16	Greece	0	1	0	1
16	Slovenia	0	1	0	1
18	Norway	0	0	1	1
Totals (18 entries)		44	44	44	132
