= Ceredigion Historical Society =

Welsh historical organisation

Ceredigion Historical Society (formerly the Cardiganshire Antiquarian Society) was founded in 1909.

== History ==
Founding members included: Revd George Eyre Evans, Llewellyn John Montford Bebb, Revd Professor E. Tyrrell-Green (Chairman), Revd J Francis Lloyd and Sir Edward Webley-Parry-Pryse (President)

The Society name changed to the Ceredigion Historical Society in 2002 from the Cardiganshire Antiquarian Society.

The Society produces regular Journals by the name of Ceredigion.
