= Sam Fisher (cyclist) =

British track cyclist (born 2006)

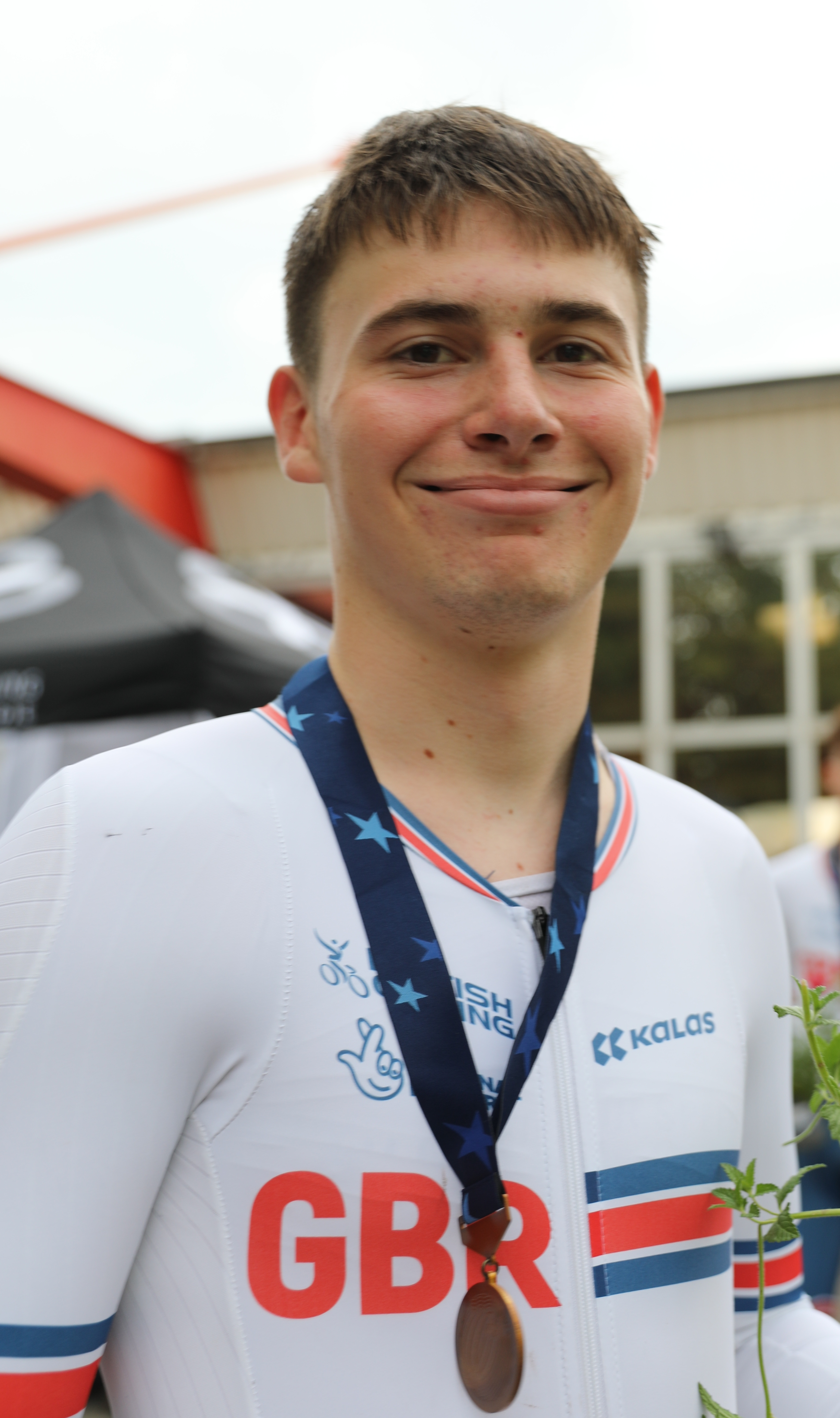
- Fisher in 2024

Personal information
- Born: 12 November 2006 (age 19) Llantrisant, Wales
- Height: 178 cm (5 ft 10 in)
- Weight: 87 kg (192 lb)

Cycling career
- Sport: Cycling
- Current team: Team Wales (track); Anexo Group Race Team (road)
- Discipline: Track / Road
- Role: Rider
- Rider type: Scratch, Pursuit
Medal record
Men's track cycling
Representing Great Britain
World Junior Championships
Bronze medal – third place	2024 Luoyang	Team pursuit
European Junior Championships
Bronze medal – third place	2024 Cottbus	Team pursuit
Bronze medal – third place	2024 Cottbus	Points race

Sam Fisher (born 12 November 2006) is a Welsh and British road and track cyclist.

== Career ==
In 2022, Fisher won four junior national titles on the track and three stage wins in road cycling for the Anexo Racing team. The following year in 2023, he joined the GB junior Academy.

At the 2024 British Cycling National Track Championships he won his first two national titles, after winning the Scratch race and the Team Pursuit titles.

== Major wins ==
2024
National Track Championships

1st Scratch
1st Team pursuit
