= Gianluca Pollefliet =

Belgian cyclist

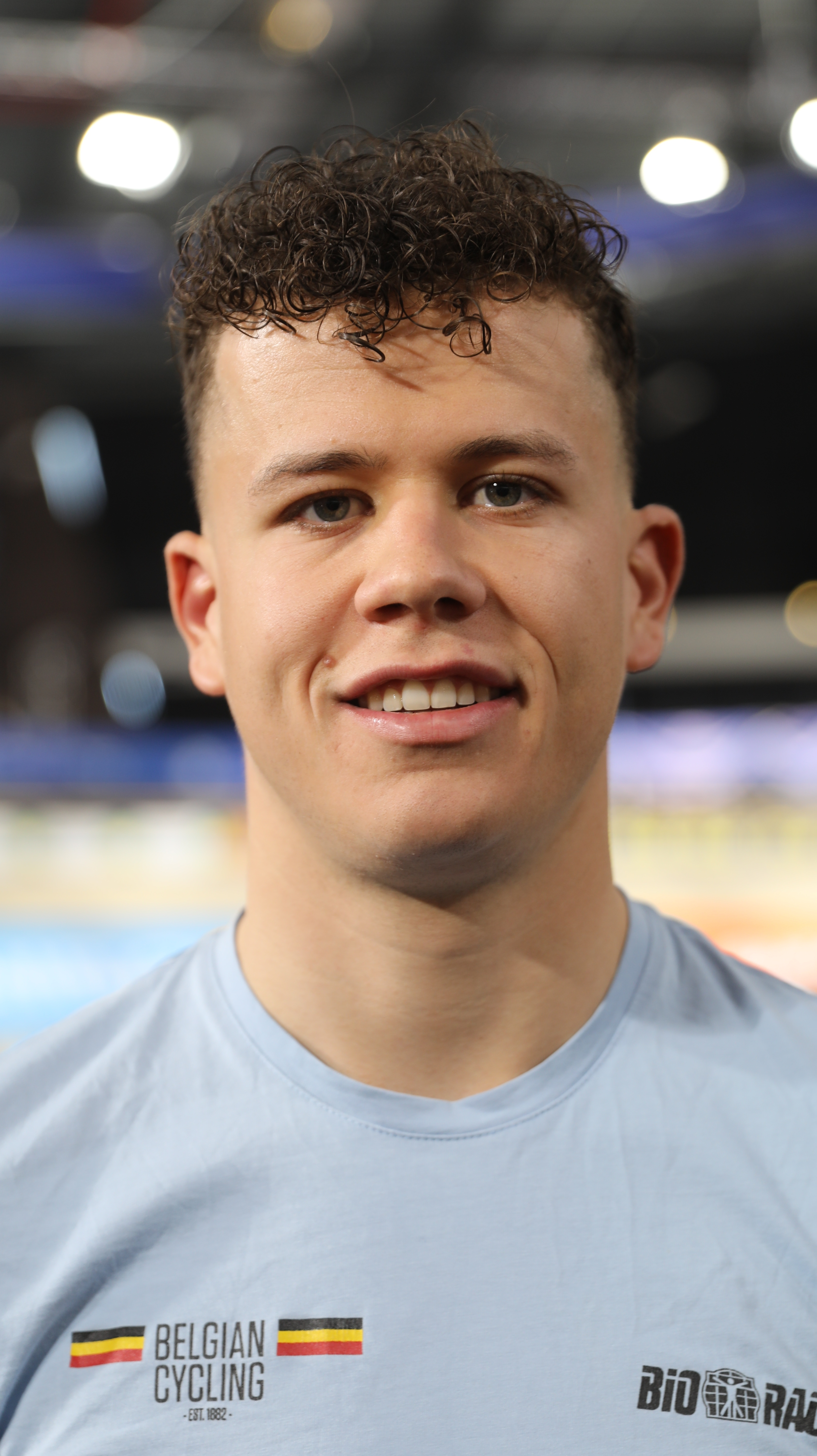
- Pollefliet in 2024

Personal information
- Born: 28 January 2002 (age 24) Bornem, Belgium
- Height: 1.80 m (5 ft 11 in)
- Weight: 74 kg (163 lb)

Cycling career
- Sport: Cycling
- Current team: Decathlon CMA CGM Team
- Disciplines: Road; Track
- Role: Rider
- Rider type: Classics specialist

Amateur teams
- 2019: Shifting Gears
- 2020: Avia–Rudyco–Janatrans
- 2021: Acrog-Tormans
- 2022: Lotto–Soudal U23

Professional teams
- 2023: Lotto–Dstny Development Team
- 2024–: Decathlon–AG2R La Mondiale
Medal record
Track cycling
European U23 & Junior Championships
| Silver medal – second place | 2022 Anadia | U23 team pursuit |
| Silver medal – second place | 2023 Anadia | Madison |
| Silver medal – second place | 2023 Anadia | Elimination |
| Bronze medal – third place | 2023 Anadia | U23 team pursuit |

Gianluca Pollefliet (born 28 January 2002) is a Belgian professional racing cyclist, who currently rides for UCI WorldTeam Decathlon CMA CGM Team.

== Major results ==
=== Road ===
2019
7th Omloop der Vlaamse Gewesten
2022
1st Stage 1 (TTT) Tour Alsace
2nd Grand Prix de la Ville de Lillers
7th Youngster Coast Challenge
2023
1st Memorial Philippe Van Coningsloo
1st Omloop Het Nieuwsblad U23
2nd Dorpenomloop Rucphen
2nd Grote Prijs Rik Van Looy
3rd Road race, National Under-23 Championships
3rd Youngster Coast Challenge
8th Paris–Roubaix Espoirs
2024
9th Grand Prix de Fourmies
2026
10th Grand Prix de Denain

=== Track ===
2022
2nd Team pursuit, UEC European Under-23 Championships
2023
UEC European Under-23 Championships

2nd Madison (with Noah Vandenbranden)
2nd Elimination
3rd Team pursuit

National Championships

2nd Madison
2nd Kilometer
3rd Elimination
