= Flora Perkins =

British cyclist (born 2003)

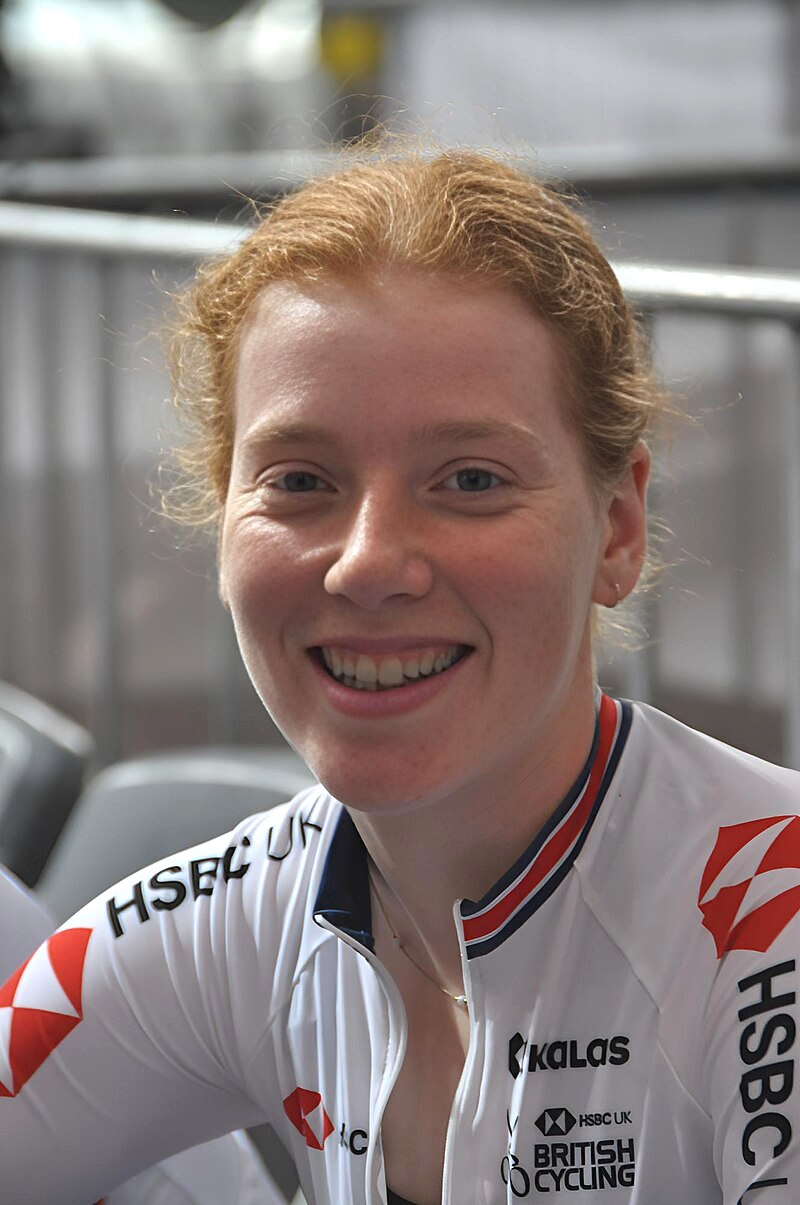
- Perkins at the 2021 UEC European Track Championships

Personal information
- Born: 16 September 2003 (age 23) London, England
- Height: 1.61 m (5 ft 3 in)

Cycling career
- Sport: Cycling
- Current team: Fenix–Premier Tech
- Discipline: Road
- Role: Rider

Professional teams
- 2022: Le Col–Wahoo
- 2023–: Fenix–Premier Tech

Flora Perkins is a British professional cyclist, who currently rides for UCI Women's WorldTeam Fenix–Premier Tech.

Perkins grew up in South London, where she raced with the VC Londres club at the Herne Hill Velodrome. In 2021, she won the amateur Banbury Star road race and junior Watersley Challenge. In 2022, she rode with Le Col–Wahoo, and received media attention for competing in major UCI World Tour races at 18 years old; Perkins rode in Paris-Roubaix Femmes and Liège–Bastogne–Liège Femmes before taking her A-level exams.

== Major results ==
2021
1st Overall Watersley Ladies Challenge
2024
3rd Argenta Classic-2 Districtenpijl
4th Road race, National Championships
