= Clássica da Arrábida =

Cycling race held in Portugal

Race details
- Date: March
- Region: Portugal
- Discipline: Road
- Competition: UCI Europe Tour
- Type: One-day race

History
- First edition: 2017
- Editions: 9 (as of 2026)
- First winner: Amaro Antunes (POR)
- Most wins: Orluis Aular (VEN) (2 wins)
- Most recent: Enea Sambinello (ITA)

Clássica da Arrábida is a one-day road cycling race held in Portugal annually since 2017. It is part of UCI Europe Tour in category 1.2.

== Winners ==
Year	Country	Rider	Team
2017	Portugal	Amaro Antunes	W52 / FC Porto / Mestre da Cor
2018	Russia	Dmitry Strakhov	Lokosphinx
2019	Spain	Jonathan Lastra	Caja Rural–Seguros RGA
2020	No race due to COVID-19 pandemic		
2021	United States	Sean Quinn	Hagens Berman Axeon
2022	Venezuela	Orluis Aular	Caja Rural–Seguros RGA
2023	Venezuela	Orluis Aular	Caja Rural–Seguros RGA
2024	Spain	Joseba López	Caja Rural–Seguros RGA
2025	Italy	Luca Giaimi	UAE Team Emirates Gen Z
2026	Italy	Enea Sambinello	UAE Team Emirates Gen Z
