= Watersley Challenge =

Dutch junior cycling race

Watersley Ladies Challenge
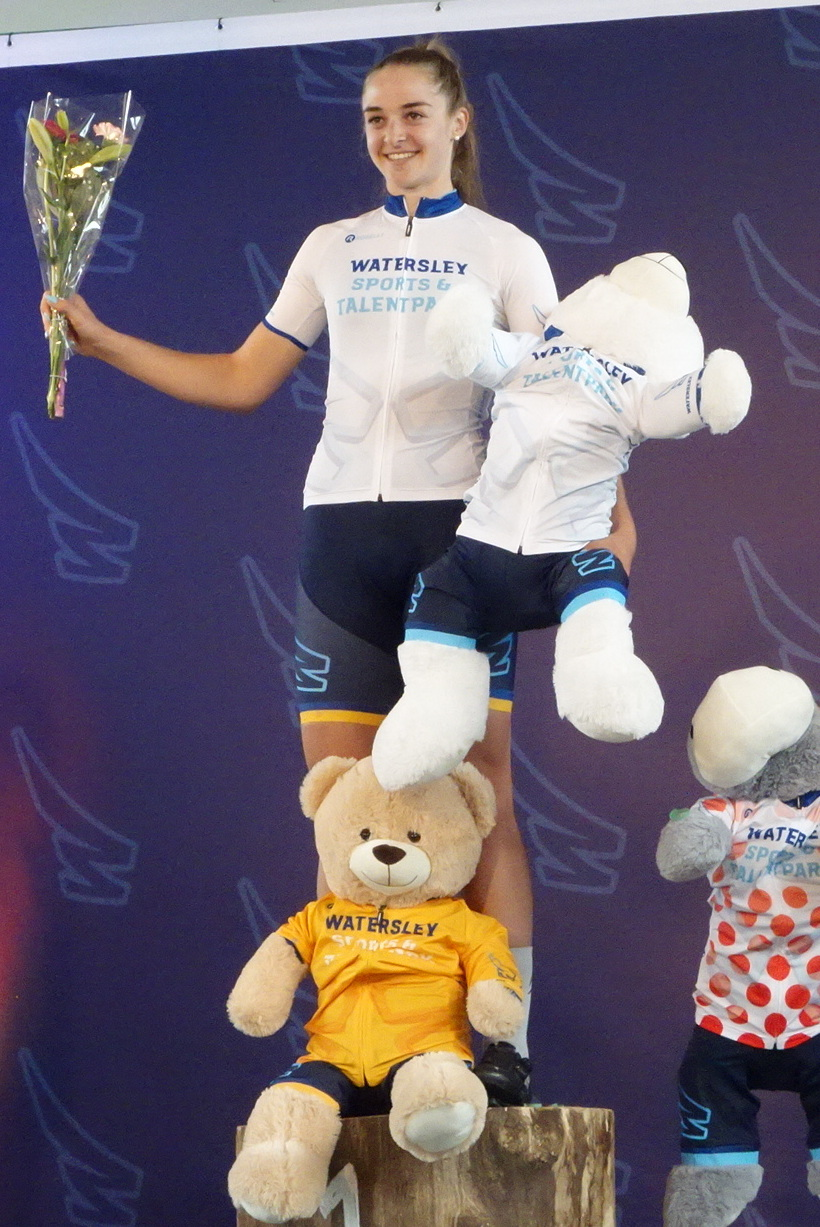
- Marith Vanhove, winner of the 2020 edition

Race details
- Date: August / September
- Region: Sittard, Limburg, Netherlands
- Discipline: Road
- Competition: UCI Junior Nations' Cup
- Type: Stage race

History
- First edition: 2018
- Editions: 8 (as of 2026)
- First winner: Pfeiffer Georgi (GBR)
- Most wins: Paula Ostiz (SPA) (2 wins)
- Most recent: Maria Okrucinska (POL)

The Watersley Ladies Challenge is a women's junior road cycling stage race held around the estate of Huis Watersley in the Dutch province of Limburg. First held in 2018, the race is part of the UCI Junior Nations' Cup, meaning the competitors ride as part of national teams.

The race is typically organized as three stages: a criterium stage, an individual time trial, and a "queen stage" with difficult climbing. The race is considered one of the most prestigious on the junior calendar, noted for its challenging course and high level of competition.

In 2021, the Watersley Women's Challenge was created by the same organizers for female riders under 23. At the time, it was the only U23 women's race on the UCI calendar. Following the 2023 edition, the race was cancelled, citing financial difficulties and "a struggle to attract entries".

In 2022, the Watersley Junior Challenge was created for male junior riders, following a similar three-stage format. It was classified as part of the UCI Junior Nations' Cup. In 2024, the race was cancelled due to lack of participation.

== Winners ==
=== Watersley Ladies Challenge ===
Top three per edition
Year	Winner	Second	Third
2018	Pfeiffer Georgi (GBR)	Rozemarijn Ammerlaan (NED)	Anna Docherty (GBR)
2019	Wilma Olausson (SWE)	Shirin van Anrooij (NED)	Anna Shackley (GBR)
2020	Marith Vanhove (BEL)	Julie De Wilde (BEL)	Anniina Ahtosalo (FIN)
2021	Flora Perkins (GBR)	Makayla MacPherson (USA)	Linda Riedmann (GER)
2022	Zoe Bäckstedt (GBR)	Julia Kopecký (CZE)	Justyna Czapla (GER)
2023	Federica Venturelli (ITA)	Fleur Moors (BEL)	Carys Lloyd (GBR)
2024	Paula Ostiz (ESP)	Puck Langenbarg (NED)	Esther Wong (GBR)
2025	Paula Ostiz (ESP)	Maria Okrucińska (POL)	Abigail Miller (GBR)
2026	Maria Okrucińska (POL)	Alejandra Neira (SPA)	Maria Acuti (ITA)

=== Watersley Womens Challenge ===
Top three per edition
Year	Winner	Second	Third
2021	Marit Raaijmakers (NED)	Shari Bossuyt (BEL)	Pien Limpens (NED)
2022	Dominika Włodarczyk (POL)	Ella Wyllie (NZL)	Lieke Nooijen (NED)
2023	Dominika Włodarczyk (POL)	Valentina Basilico (ITA)	Eline Jansen (NED)

=== Watersley Junior Challenge ===
Top three per edition
Year	Winner	Second	Third
2022	Max van der Meulen (NED)	Menno Huising (NED)	Roman Ermakov (RUS)
2023	Oscar Chamberlain (AUS)	Paul Seixas (FRA)	Kasper Haugland (NOR)
2024	Race cancelled		
2025	Samuel Gunnink (NED)	Monty Rigby (CAN)	Ben Morin (CAN)
2026	Rowan Nistal (USA)	Mark Ketteringham (GBR)	William Coles (GBR)
