= Trophée Centre Morbihan =

Race details
- Date: May
- Region: Morbihan
- Discipline: Road race
- Competition: UCI Junior Nations' Cup
- Type: Stage race
- Web site: www.tropheecentremorbihan.fr

History
- First edition: 1993
- Editions: 30 (as of 2025)
- First winner: Rodrigue Le Lamer (FRA)
- Most wins: Florentin Lecamus-Lambert (FRA) (2 wins)
- Most recent: Max Hinds (GBR)

The Trophée Centre Morbihan is a junior (ages 17–18) multi-day cycling race held annually in Morbihan, France. It has been part of the UCI Junior Nations' Cup since 2013.

== Winners ==
| Year | Winner | Second | Third |
|---|---|---|---|
| 1993 | (France) Rodrigue Le Lamer | Wartel | (France) Cigana |
| 1994 | (France) Florent Brard | (France) Willy Gasnier | (France) Laurent Lefèvre |
| 1995 | (France) René Gaudin | (France) Marc Picquendar | |
| 1996 | (France) Benoît Le Borgne | (France) Lemoing | (France) Thomas Lécuyer |
| 1997 | (Spain) Andoni Aranaga | (France) Sébastien Joly | (France) Verger |
| 1998 | (France) Pierre Le Nahénec | (France) Raphaël Lamy | (France) Thébault |
| 1999 | Cancelled | | |
| 2000 | (France) Lloyd Mondory | (France) Anthony Boyer | (France) Nicolas Moncomble |
| 2001 | (France) Anthony Boyer | (France) David Jehanno | (France) Samuel Boudard |
| 2002 | (Finland) Jukka Vastaranta | (France) Tom Thiblier | (France) Arnaud Gérard |
| 2003 | (France) Guillaume Blot | (United States) Jesse Anthony | (France) Jérémy Beyaert |
| 2004 | (France) Mikaël Cherel | (France) Vivien Séguinot | (France) Damien Branaa |
| 2005 | (France) Ludovic Bret | (Netherlands) Robin Chaigneau | (France) Kévin Cherruault |
| 2006 | (France) Sylvain Greiner | (Netherlands) Lars Vierbergen | (France) Étienne Pieret |
| 2007 | (France) Loïc Desriac | (France) Romain Cherruault | (France) Dimitri Le Boulch |
| 2008 | (United States) Nathan Brown | (France) Nicolas Sailleau | (France) Clément Bouton |
| 2009 | (Netherlands) Moreno Hofland | (France) Erwan Téguel | (Belgium) Niels Van Laer |
| 2010 | (France) Vincent Colas | (United States) Lawson Craddock | (France) Olivier Le Gac |
| 2011 | (Belgium) Thomas Vanbesien | (France) Olivier Le Gac | (France) Florian Sénéchal |
| 2012 | (New Zealand) Hayden McCormick | (Netherlands) Piotr Havik | (Belgium) Tiesj Benoot |
| 2013 | (Netherlands) Mathieu van der Poel | (Belarus) Aleksandr Riabushenko | (France) Rémi Cavagna |
| 2014 | (Norway) Erlend Blikra | (Russia) Nikolay Cherkasov | (Denmark) Niklas Larsen |
| 2015 | (Denmark) Anthon Charmig | (Republic of Ireland) Michael O'Loughlin | (Denmark) Mikkel Honoré |
| 2016 | (France) Florentin Lecamus-Lambert | (Denmark) Jakob Egholm | (France) Clément Davy |
| 2017 | (France) Florentin Lecamus-Lambert | (Norway) Andreas Leknessund | (Slovenia) Nik Čemažar |
| 2018 | (Belgium) Remco Evenepoel | (Italy) Andrea Piccolo | (Norway) Søren Wærenskjold |
| 2019 | (Germany) Michel Hessmann | (United Kingdom) Samuel Watson | (Norway) Oskar Johansson |
| 2020 | Cancelled | | |
| 2021 | Cancelled | | |
| 2022 | (Belgium) Jens Verbrugghe | (Portugal) António Morgado | (Norway) Johannes Kulset |
| 2023 | (United Kingdom) Ben Wiggins | (France) Titouan Fontaine | (France) Clément Sanchez |
| 2024 | (France) Axel Bouquet | (France) Eliott Boulet | (France) Paul Seixas |
| 2025 | (United Kingdom) Max Hinds | (Italy) Mattia Agostinacchio | (Belgium) Édouard Claisse |
