= 2026 UEC European Track Championships (under-23 & junior) =

Track cycling championship

- Venue: Cottbus, Germany
- Date: 7–12 July
- Velodrome: Lausitz Velodrome
- Events: 44

The 2026 UEC European Track Championships (under-23 & junior) were the 26th continental championships for European under-23 and junior track cyclists, and the 17th since the event was renamed following the reorganisation of European track cycling in 2010. The event took place at the Lausitz Velodrome in Cottbus from 7 to 12 July 2026.

== Medal summary ==
=== Under-23 ===
Event	Gold		Silver		Bronze	
Men's events
Sprint	Mattia Predomo; Italy		Nikita Kiriltsev; Individual Neutral Athletes		David Peterka; Czech Republic	
Team sprint	Italy; Fabio Del Medico; Stefano Minuta; Mattia Predomo; Thomas Melotto	58.917^{G}	Czech Republic; David Peterka; Jan Pořízek; Adam Rauschgold	59.463^{G}	Belgium; Runar De Schrijver; Lowie Nulens; Thibault Van Laere	1:00.735^{B}
1 km time trial	Étienne Oliviero; France	1:02.174	Matthias Sylvanise; France	1:02.622	Fabio Del Medico; Italy	1:02.867
Keirin	Nikita Kiriltsev; Individual Neutral Athletes		Jan Pořízek; Czech Republic		David Peterka; Czech Republic	
Individual pursuit	Renato Favero; Italy	4:15.914^{G}	Witse Bertels; Belgium	4:16.660^{G}	Etienne Grimod; Italy	4:17.962^{B}
Team pursuit	Italy; Christian Fantini; Renato Favero; Matteo Fiorin; Etienne Grimod; Ares Costa	4:02.184^{G}	Germany; Moritz Binder; Attila Höfig; Bruno Keßler; Paul-Felix Petry; Ben Jochum	4:05.693^{G}	France; Camille Charret; Mathieu Dupé; Nathan Marcoux; Luc Royer	4:03.955^{B}
Points race	Seth Dunwoody; Ireland	23 pts	Ilya Savekin; Individual Neutral Athletes	20 pts	Tobias Müller; Germany	19 pts
Scratch	Raphael Kokas; Austria		Ilya Savekin; Individual Neutral Athletes		Witse Bertels; Belgium	
Madison	Austria; Heimo Fugger; Raphael Kokas	43 pts	Belgium; Milan Van den Haute; Matijs Van Strijthem	41 pts	Germany; Bruno Keßler; Tobias Müller	34 pts
Omnium	Álvaro Navas; Spain	120 pts	Davide Stella; Italy	112 pts	Ramazan Yılmaz; Turkey	106 pts
Elimination race	Matteo Fiorin; Italy		Heimo Fugger; Austria		Stan Dens; Belgium	
Women's events
Sprint	Clara Schneider; Germany		Ekaterina Evlanova; Individual Neutral Athletes		Elizaveta Solozobova; Individual Neutral Athletes	
Team sprint	Individual Neutral Athletes; Iuliia Chertikhina; Ekaterina Evlanova; Sofia Novikova; Elizaveta Solozobova	1:06.720^{G}	Germany; Lara-Sophie Jäger; Anastasia Kuniß; Clara Schneider	1:06.740^{G}	Italy; Anita Baima; Matilde Cenci; Siria Trevisan	1:08.797^{B}
1 km time trial	Anastasia Kuniß; Germany	1:07.879	Marie-Louisa Drouode; France	1:09.249	Urszula Sipko; Poland	1:09.717
Keirin	Clara Schneider; Germany		Anna Jaborníková; Czech Republic		Zita Gheysens; Belgium	
Individual pursuit	Federica Venturelli; Italy	4:43.174^{G}	Luca Vierstraete; Belgium	4:48.766^{G}	Isabel Sharp; Great Britain	4:51.785^{B}
Team pursuit	Germany; Messane Bräutigam; Pia Grünewald; Magdalena Leis; Seána Littbarski-Gray; Hannah Kunz	4:33.122^{G}	Belarus; Alina Karotkina; Polina Konrad; Adelina Sakun; Kseniya Shynkarenka	4:35.266^{G}	Poland; Eliza Rabażyńska; Urszula Sipko; Martyna Szczęsna; Maja Tracka	4:32.412^{B}
Points race	Federica Venturelli; Italy	34 pts	Nienke Veenhoven; Netherlands	23 pts	Polina Danshina; Individual Neutral Athletes	14 pts
Scratch	Imogen Wolff; Great Britain		Nienke Veenhoven; Netherlands		Lani Wittevrongel; Belgium	
Madison	Netherlands; Lisa van Belle; Nienke Veenhoven	35 pts	United Kingdom; Isabel Sharp; Imogen Wolff	22 pts	Individual Neutral Athletes; Polina Danshina; Aglaya Kokareva	21 pts
Omnium	Polina Konrad; Belarus	135 pts	Messane Bräutigam; Germany	109 pts	Ida Fialla; Denmark	107 pts
Elimination race	Polina Konrad; Belarus		Anita Baima; Italy		Lorena Leu; Switzerland	

=== Junior ===
Event	Gold		Silver		Bronze	
Men's events
Sprint	Mikhail Demish; Individual Neutral Athletes		Matteo Ghirelli; Italy		Filippo Cusumano; Italy	
Team sprint	Germany; Til Krüger; Matyáš Malina; Leonidas Rekowski	1:01.921^{G}	Great Britain; Dylan Bowen; Charlie Holt; Kristian Larigo; George Harold	1:02.178^{G}	Italy; Cesare Castellani; Filippo Cusumano; Matteo Ghirelli; Ivan Borghi Pelizzoni	1:01.843^{B}
1 km time trial	Leonidas Rekowski; Germany	1:03.439	Matteo Ghirelli; Italy	1:03.490	Mikhail Demish; Individual Neutral Athletes	1:04.098
Keirin	Til Krüger; Germany		Matyáš Malina; Germany		Mikhail Demish; Individual Neutral Athletes	
Individual pursuit	Ruben Ferrari; Italy	3:21.067^{G}	Daniel Thompson; Great Britain	3:22.684^{G}	Antoine Salamin; Switzerland	3:20.930^{B}
Team pursuit	Italy; Ruben Ferrari; Paolo Marangon; Nicola Padovan; Alberto Veglia; Lorenzo Caccarello	4:05.808^{G}	Switzerland; Yanis Berthoud; Antoine Salamin; Jann Salm; Noah Schnyder	4:07.168^{G}	Individual Neutral Athletes; Matvei Iakovlev; Artem Iatsina; Rostislav Novolodskii; Daniil Veshnyakov	4:11.251^{B}
Points race	Ido Dagan; Israel	29 pts	Leon Resag; Germany	25 pts	Daniel Kartevoll; Norway	23 pts
Scratch	Jann Salm; Switzerland		Ido Dagan; Israel		Raul Esch; Germany	
Madison	Germany; Raul Esch; Leon Resag	33 pts	Italy; Nicola Padovan; Jacopo Vendramin	25 pts	Belgium; Sune De Valck; Cedric Van Gijsel	20 pts
Omnium	Nicola Padovan; Italy	132 pts	Rostislav Novolodskii; Individual Neutral Athletes	124 pts	Asier Fortea; Spain	109 pts
Elimination race	Jacopo Vendramin; Italy		Sune De Valck; Belgium		Vicent Andrés; Spain	
Women's events
Sprint	Emílie Jarošová; Czech Republic		Veronika Solozobova; Individual Neutral Athletes		Angelina Shastak; Belarus	
Team sprint	Germany; Lara Colberg; Celine Prochnau; Marie Louise Raake; Mira Rosinski	1:08.745^{G}	Individual Neutral Athletes; Mariya Belyaeva; Viktoriia Luchina; Veronika Solozobova	1:09.115^{G}	Great Britain; Eve James; Amelia Kuffour; Lottie Wardrop; Bronwen Howard-Rees	1:09.685^{B}
1 km time trial	Angelina Shastak; Belarus	1:09.502	Maya Ferrante; Italy	1:09.793	Jana Gevers; Belgium	1:10.263
Keirin	Emílie Jarošová; Czech Republic		Lara Colberg; Germany		Veronika Solozobova; Individual Neutral Athletes	
Individual pursuit	Angelina Novolodskaya; Individual Neutral Athletes	3:40.493^{G}	Phoebe Taylor; Great Britain	3:44.822^{G}	Yana Decruyenaere; Belgium	3:42.102^{B}
Team pursuit	Italy; Maria Acuti; Elisa Bianchi; Linda Rapporti; Matilde Rossignoli; Azzurra Ballan	4:40.432^{G}	Belgium; Yana Decruyenaere; Jana Gevers; Faye Lagaeysse; Anna Meeusen; Lise Reyniers	4:42.598^{G}	Germany; Edda Bieberle; Amandine Jakob; Eufemia Schmieder; Sophie Schuster; Charlotte Späth	4:50.338^{B}
Points race	Emer Heverin; Ireland	20 pts	Olga Kostina; Individual Neutral Athletes	11 pts	Imke Menting; Netherlands	10 pts
Scratch	Agata Campana; Italy		Phoebe Taylor; Great Britain		Jana Gevers; Belgium	
Madison	Individual Neutral Athletes; Olga Kostina; Angelina Novolodskaya	30 pts	Italy; Agata Campana; Matilde Rossignoli	21 pts	Great Britain; Melanie Rowe; Phoebe Taylor	21 pts
Omnium	Angelina Novolodskaya; Individual Neutral Athletes	122 pts	Emer Heverin; Ireland	104 pts	Matilde Rossignoli; Italy	103 pts
Elimination race	Agata Campana; Italy		Olga Kostina; Individual Neutral Athletes		Anna Lloyd; Great Britain	

== Medal table ==
* Host nation (Germany)

Rank	Nation	Gold	Silver	Bronze	Total
1	Italy	14	7	6	27
2	Germany*	9	6	4	19
–	Individual Neutral Athletes	6	9	7	22
3	Belarus	3	1	1	5
4	Czech Republic	2	3	2	7
5	Austria	2	1	0	3
5	Ireland	2	1	0	3
7	Great Britain	1	5	4	10
8	France	1	2	1	4
8	Netherlands	1	2	1	4
10	Switzerland	1	1	2	4
11	Israel	1	1	0	2
12	Spain	1	0	2	3
13	Belgium	0	5	9	14
14	Poland	0	0	2	2
15	Denmark	0	0	1	1
15	Norway	0	0	1	1
15	Turkey	0	0	1	1
Totals (17 entries)		44	44	44	132
