= List of world junior records in track cycling =

The World junior records in track cycling are ratified by the Union Cycliste Internationale (UCI).

== Men ==
Key to tables: Awaiting ratification Record not kept by UCI Not ratified or later rescinded by UCI

Event	Record	Athlete	Nationality	Date	Meet	Place	Ref
Flying 200 m time trial	9.738	Stefan Ritter	Canada	7 October 2016	Pan American Championships	Aguascalientes, Mexico	
Flying 500 m time trial	26.969	Alexander Khromykh	Soviet Union	9 August 1990		Moscow, Soviet Union	
1 km time trial	59.875	Tayte Ryan	Australia	25 August 2024	World Junior Championships	Luoyang, China	
Team sprint^{[L]}	43.789	Colin Rudolph; Pete-Collin Flemming; Jakob Vogt	Germany	23 August 2023	World Junior Championships	Cali, Colombia	
3000 m individual pursuit	3:03.246	Henry Hobbs	Great Britain	17 July 2025	European Junior Championships	Anadia, Portugal	
4000 m team pursuit	3:51.199	Davide Stella; Ares Costa; Christian Fantini; Alessio Magagnotti	Italy	22 August 2024	World Junior Championships	Luoyang, China	
Hour record	50.792 km	Jonas Walton	United States	17 October 2022		Aguascalientes, Mexico	

== Women ==
Event	Record	Athlete	Nationality	Date	Meet	Place	Ref
Flying 200 m time trial	10.508	Stefany Cuadrado	Colombia	9 August 2024	Olympic Games	Saint-Quentin-en-Yvelines, France	
Flying 500 m time trial	30.230	Svetlana Potemkina	Soviet Union	27 October 1991		Moscow, Soviet Union	
500 m time trial	33.812	Luo Xuehuang	China	26 August 2023	World Junior Championships	Cali, Colombia	
1 km time trial	1:06.893	Angelina Shastak	Belarus	22 August 2026	World Junior Championships	Heusden-Zolder, Belgium	
Team sprint (500 m)^{[L]}	33.899	Pauline Grabosch; Emma Hinze	Germany	19 August 2015	World Junior Championships	Astana, Kazakhstan	
Team sprint (750 m)^{[L]}	48.759	Anastasiya Pershina; Veronika Solozobova; Viktoriia Luchina	AIN	19 August 2026	World Junior Championships	Heusden-Zolder, Belgium	
2000 m individual pursuit	2:15.678	Federica Venturelli	Italy	26 August 2023	World Junior Championships	Cali, Colombia	
3000 m individual pursuit	3:28.218	Zoé Bihan	France	22 August 2026	World Junior Championships	Heusden-Zolder, Belgium	
3000 m team pursuit^{[F]}	3:24.372	Georgia Baker; Taylah Jennings; Kelsey Robson	Australia	22 August 2012	World Junior Championships	Invercargill, New Zealand	
4000 m team pursuit	4:20.263	Erin Boothman; Abigail Miller; Evie Smith; Phoebe Taylor	Great Britain	21 August 2025	World Junior Championships	Apeldoorn, Netherlands	

== Notes ==
- ^{^{F}} After the 2013 World Championships (elite), the 3000m / 3 rider format was replaced by a 4000m / 4 rider format.
- ^{^{L}} Recognised on 250m tracks only.
