= Polina Konrad =

Belarusian cyclist (born 2005)

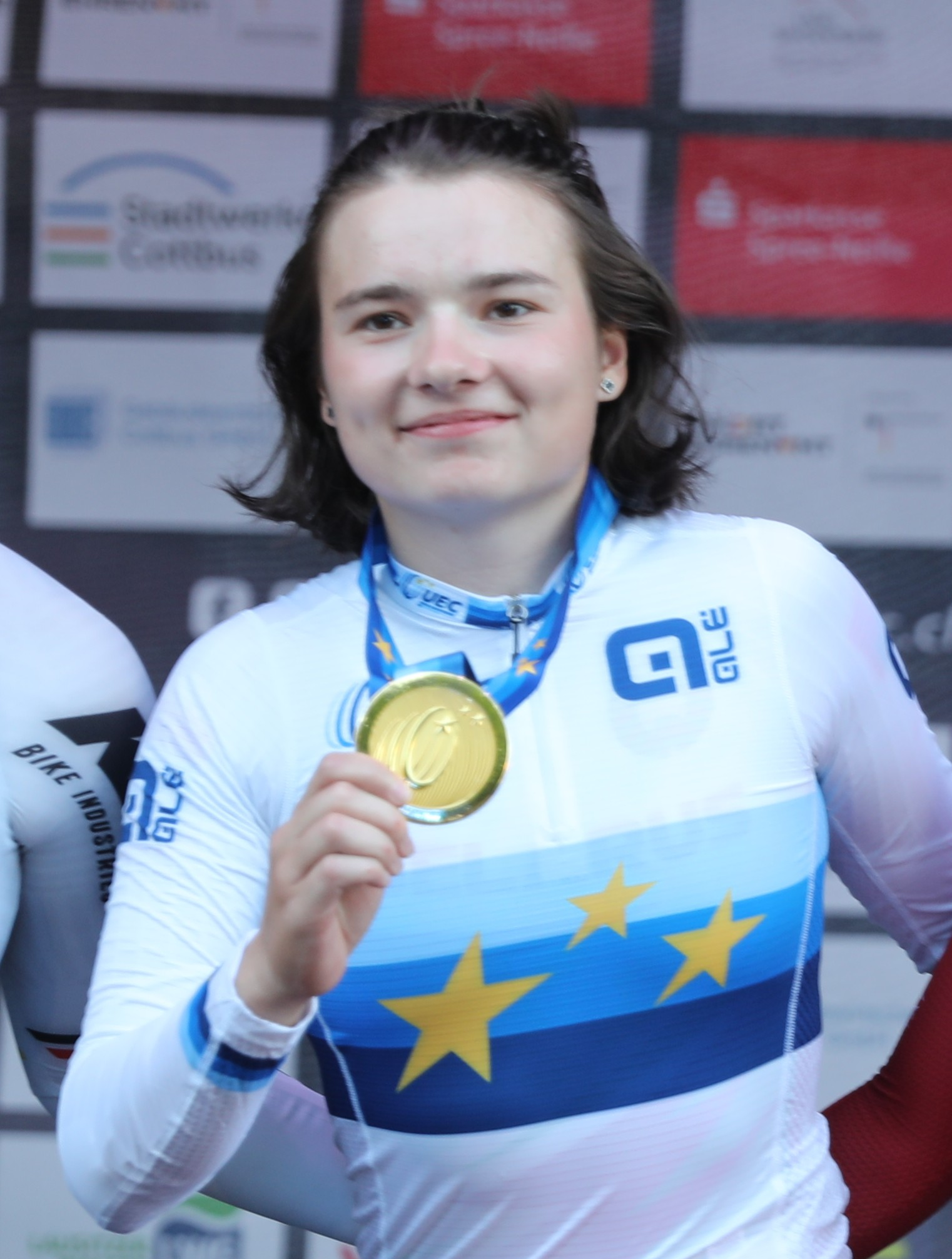
- Konrad at the 2026 UEC European Track Championships (under-23 & junior)

Personal information
- Born: 1 November 2005 (age 20)

Cycling career
- Sport: Cycling
- Disciplines: Track; Road

Professional teams
- 2024: Astana Dewi Women Team
- 2025: Minsk Cycling Club
Medal record
Representing Belarus
Women's track cycling
European Under-23 Championships
Gold medal – first place	2026 Cottbus	Elimination race
Gold medal – first place	2026 Cottbus	Omnium
Silver medal – second place	2026 Cottbus	Team Pursuit

Polina Konrad (born 1 November 2005) is a Belarusian track and road cyclist. She is the 2026 Belarus time trial champion.

She won two gold medals at the 2026 UEC European Under-23 Track Championships, in the omnium and elimination race.

== Major results ==
=== Road ===
2023
National Junior Championships

1st Time trial
1st Road race

2025
National Under-23 Championships

1st Time trial
5th Road race

2026
National Championships

1st Time trial
2nd Road race

=== Track ===
2026
European Under-23 Championships

1st Elimination race
1st Omnium
2nd Team pursuit
