= 2025 UEC European Track Championships (under-23 & junior) =

Track cycling championship

- Venue: Anadia
- Date: 15–20 July
- Velodrome: Velódromo Nacional de Sangalhos

The 2025 UEC European Track Championships (under-23 & junior) were the 25th continental championships for European under-23 and junior track cyclists, and the 16th since the event was renamed following the reorganisation of European track cycling in 2010. The event took place at the Velódromo Nacional de Sangalhos in Anadia, Portugal from 15 to 20 July 2025.

== Medal summary ==
=== Under-23 ===
Event	Gold		Silver		Bronze	
Men's events
Sprint	Nikita Kiriltsev; Individual Neutral Athletes-2		Lowie Nulens; Belgium		Marcus Hiley; Great Britain	
Team sprint	Italy; Stefano Minuta; Daniele Napolitano; Mattia Predomo	43.648^{G}	Czech Republic; David Peterka; Jan Pořízek; Adam Rauschgold	43.854^{G}	France; Oscar Caron; Étienne Oliviero; Matthias Sylvanise	43.956^{B}
1 km time trial	Henric Hackmann; Germany	1:00.497	Étienne Oliviero; France	1:00.616	Esteban Sánchez; Spain	1:01.449
Keirin	Nikita Kiriltsev; Individual Neutral Athletes-2		Nikita Kalachnik; Individual Neutral Athletes-2		Lowie Nulens; Belgium	
Individual pursuit	Josh Charlton; Great Britain	caught opponent^{G}	Renato Favero; Italy	OVL^{G}	Luca Giaimi; Italy	4:10.634^{B}
Team pursuit	Great Britain; Josh Charlton; Noah Hobbs; Elliot Rowe; Ben Wiggins; William Salter	3:50.272^{G}	Germany; Moritz Binder; Benjamin Boos; Max-David Briese; Bruno Keßler; Ben Jochum	3:54.010^{G}	Italy; Christian Fantini; Renato Favero; Matteo Fiorin; Luca Giaimi; Julian Bortolami'	3:51.349^{B}
Points race	Juan David Sierra; Italy	91 pts	Daniil Kazakov; Individual Neutral Athletes-2	80 pts	Elliot Rowe; Great Britain	74 pts
Scratch	Davide Stella; Italy		Lucas Menanteau; France		Karsten Larsen Feldmann; Norway	
Madison	Belgium; Thibaut Bernard; Milan Van den Haute	65 pts	Germany; Benjamin Boos; Bruno Keßler	53 pts	Great Britain; Ben Wiggins; Noah Hobbs	49 pts
Omnium	Héctor Álvarez; Spain	137 pts	Rik van der Wal; Netherlands	131 pts	Ilya Savekin; Individual Neutral Athletes-2	128 pts
Elimination race	Tom Crabbe; Belgium		Emmanuel Houcou; France		William Lowth; Denmark	
Women's events
Sprint	Iona Moir; Great Britain		Alina Lysenko; Individual Neutral Athletes-2		Rhian Edmunds; Great Britain	
Team sprint	Poland; Oliwia Gerc; Nikola Jankowska; Natalia Walecka	51.484	Great Britain; Rhian Edmunds; Iona Moir; Georgette Rand	52.845	Only two teams	
1 km time trial	Alina Lysenko; Individual Neutral Athletes-2	1:06.567	Rhian Edmunds; Great Britain	1:07.364	Clara Schneider; Germany	1:07.394
Keirin	Alina Lysenko; Individual Neutral Athletes-2		Rhian Edmunds; Great Britain		Iona Moir; Great Britain	
Individual pursuit	Federica Venturelli; Italy	caught opponent^{G}	Grace Lister; Great Britain	OVL^{G}	Lisa van Belle; Netherlands	4:40.472^{B}
Team pursuit	Great Britain; Maddie Leech; Grace Lister; Carys Lloyd; Izzy Sharp	4:16.270^{G}	Germany; Messane Bräutigam; Pia Grünewald; Hannah Kunz; Seána Littbarski-Gray; Selma Lantzsch	4:19.104^{G}	Belgium; Hélène Hesters; Marith Vanhove; Luca Vierstraete; Lani Wittevrongel	4:21.805^{B}
Points race	Alena Ivanchenko; Individual Neutral Athletes-2	54 pts	Ainara Albert; Spain	53 pts	Luca Vierstraete; Belgium	41 pts
Scratch	Messane Bräutigam; Germany		Sara Fiorin; Italy		Laura Auerbach-Lind; Denmark	
Madison	Germany; Messane Bräutigam; Fabienne Jährig	32 pts	Netherlands; Lisa van Belle; Yuli van der Molen	26 pts	Belgium; Hélène Hesters; Marith Vanhove	19 pts
Omnium	Lisa van Belle; Netherlands	133 pts	Maddie Leech; Great Britain	128 pts	Clémence Chéreau; France	118 pts
Elimination race	Valeriya Valgonen; Individual Neutral Athletes-2		Isabella Escalera; Spain		Anita Baima; Italy	

=== Junior ===
Event	Gold		Silver		Bronze	
Men's events
Sprint	Archie Gill; Great Britain		Benjamin Bock; Germany		Thomas Molatto; Italy	
Team sprint	Great Britain; Archie Gill; Ioan Hepburn; Kristian Larigo; Charlie Holt	44.586^{G}	Germany; Benjamin Bock; Leonidas Rekowski; Maurice Steckel; Finn-Liam Petterson	44.923^{G}	France; Tristan Favennec; Nicolas Laugier; Cameron Rabourdin	46.234^{B}
1 km time trial	Leonidas Rekowski; Germany	1:02.118	Dmitrii Pavlovskii; Individual Neutral Athletes-2	1:02.498	Julius Porthun; Germany	1:03.099
Keirin	Benjamin Bock; Germany		Archie Gill; Great Britain		Dovydas Činga; Lithuania	
Individual pursuit	Henry Hobbs; Great Britain	3:03.246^{G} JWR	Luc Royer; France	3:10.597^{G}	Ruben Ferrari; Italy	3:11.152^{B}
Team pursuit	Italy; Riccardo Colombo; Francesco Cornacchini; Alessio Magagnotti; Francesco Matteoli; Ruben Ferrari	3:55.635^{G}	Great Britain; Rory Gravelle; Max Hinds; Henry Hobbs; James Daniel Thompson; Albie Jones	3:56.843^{G}	Germany; Hugo Esch; Raul Esch; Lenny Karstedt; Attila Höfig	3:59.630^{B}
Points race	Mark Popov; Individual Neutral Athletes-2	74 pts	Heimo Fugger; Austria	56 pts	Julian Bortolami; Italy	53 pts
Scratch	Jacopo Vendramin; Italy		Maximilian Fitzgerald; Ireland		Matvei Iakovlev; Individual Neutral Athletes-2	
Madison	Belgium; Witse Bertels; Thor Michielsen	32 pts	Italy; Julian Bortolami; Riccardo Colombo	27 pts	Germany; Hugo Esch; Attila Höfig	27 pts
Omnium	Mark Popov; Individual Neutral Athletes-2	118 pts	Nathan Marcoux; France	105 pts	Witse Bertels; Belgium	104 pts
Elimination race	Heimo Fugger; Austria		Matvei Iakovlev; Individual Neutral Athletes-2		Ilya Slesarenko; Individual Neutral Athletes-1	
Women's events
Sprint	Emilia Waterstradt; Germany		Zita Gheysens; Belgium		Iuliia Chertikhina; Individual Neutral Athletes-2	
Team sprint	Italy; Matilde Cenci; Rebecca Fiscarelli; Siria Trevisan; Agata Campana	49.747^{G}	Germany; Lara Colberg; Emilia Waterstradt; Amy Weber	49.858^{G}	Belgium; Julie Geers; Zita Gheysens; Lore Wolfs	50.643^{B}
1 km time trial	Erin Boothman; Great Britain	1:08.092; JWR	Iuliia Chertikhina; Individual Neutral Athletes-2	1:08.875	Zita Gheysens; Belgium	1:09.203
Keirin	Siria Trevisan; Italy		Emilia Waterstradt; Germany		Zita Gheysens; Belgium	
Individual pursuit	Ida Fialla; Denmark	3:31.442^{G} JWR	Linda Rapporti; Italy	3:35.568^{G}	Arabella Blackburn; Great Britain	3:34.411^{B}
Team pursuit	Great Britain; Erin Boothman; Abigail Miller; Evie Smith; Phoebe Taylor; Arabella Blackburn	4:20.376^{G} JWR	Italy; Elisa Bianchi; Chantal Pegolo; Matilde Rossignoli; Linda Sanarini; Erja Bianchi	4:28.149^{G}	Germany; Paula Gloning; Magdalena Leis; Sophia Schrödel; Julia Servay	caught opponent^{B}
Points race	Chantal Pegolo; Italy	40 pts	Polina Danshina; Individual Neutral Athletes-2	39 pts	Ida Fialla; Denmark	28 pts
Scratch	Ida Fialla; Denmark		Agata Campana; Italy		Britt Jeucken; Netherlands	
Madison	Great Britain; Erin Boothman; Grace Miller	50 pts	Italy; Chantal Pegolo; Linda Sanarini	46 pts	France; Lilous Jauvin; Jessica Rouat	13 pts
Omnium	Polina Danshina; Individual Neutral Athletes-2	151 pts	Ida Fialla; Denmark	125 pts	Leyre Almena; Spain	108 pts
Elimination race	Ida Fialla; Denmark		Gabriela Kaczmarczyk; Poland		Aglaya Kokareva; Individual Neutral Athletes-2	

== Medal table ==
* Host nation (Portugal)

Rank	Nation	Gold	Silver	Bronze	Total
1	Great Britain	10	7	6	23
2	Italy	9	7	6	22
–	Individual Neutral Athletes-2	9	7	4	20
3	Germany	6	7	5	18
4	Belgium	3	2	8	13
5	Denmark	3	1	3	7
6	Netherlands	1	2	2	5
6	Spain	1	2	2	5
8	Austria	1	1	0	2
8	Poland	1	1	0	2
10	France	0	5	4	9
11	Czech Republic	0	1	0	1
11	Ireland	0	1	0	1
13	Lithuania	0	0	1	1
13	Norway	0	0	1	1
–	Individual Neutral Athletes-1	0	0	1	1
Totals (14 entries)		44	44	43	131
