= Ida Fialla =

Danish cyclist (born 2008)

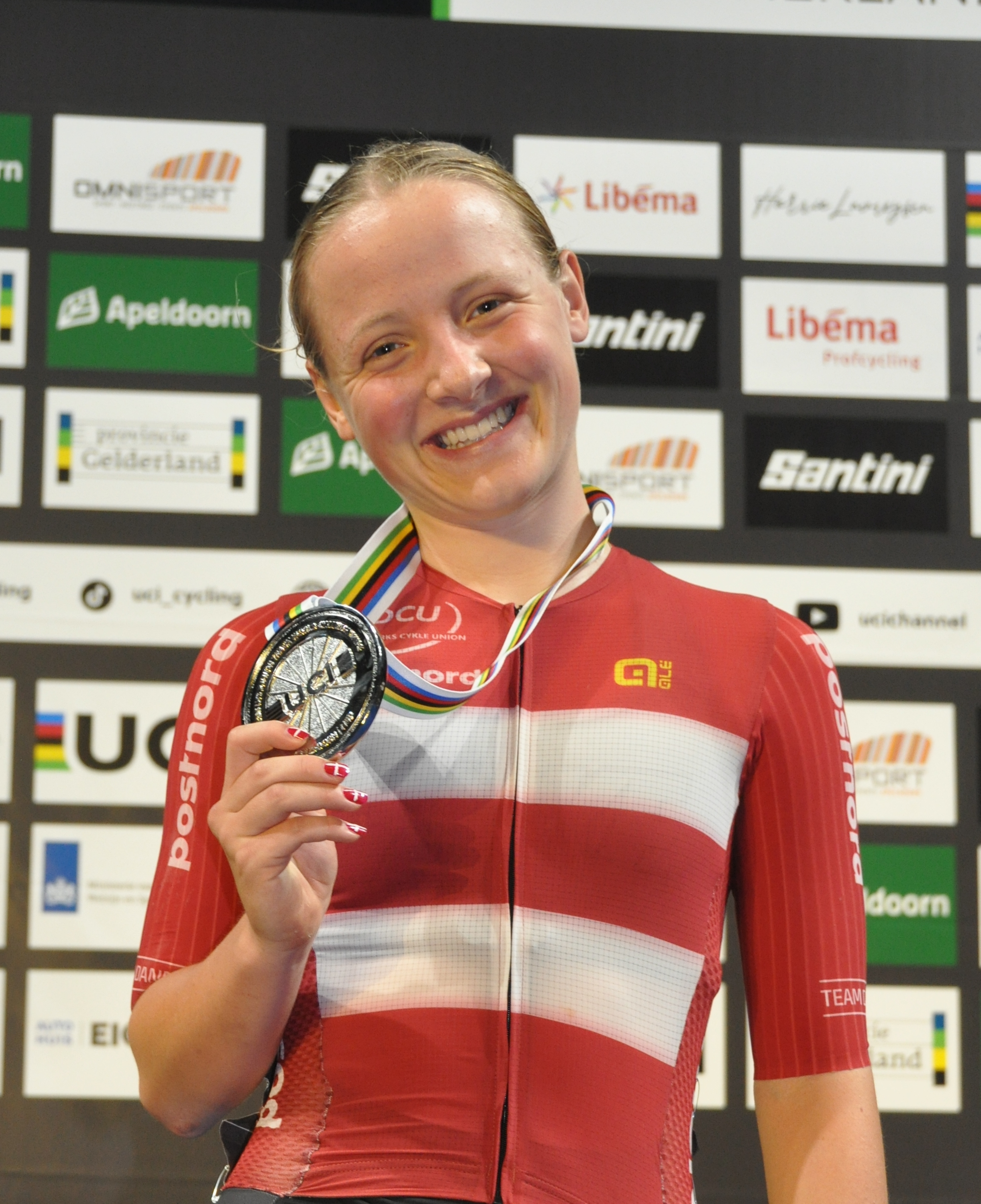
- Ida Fialla, Silver in Omnium at the 2025 UCI Junior Track Cycling World Championships

Personal information
- Full name: Ida Dam Fialla
- Born: 13 August 2008 (age 18) Odense, Denmark

Cycling career
- Sport: Cycling
- Disciplines: Track; Road
- Role: Rider

Amateur teams
- 2020–2024: Cykling Odense
- 2025: Team Nyt Syn by Fialla
Medal record
Representing Denmark
Women's track cycling
World Junior Championships
Gold medal – first place	2025 Apeldoorn	Individual pursuit
Silver medal – second place	2025 Apeldoorn	Omnium
Silver medal – second place	2025 Apeldoorn	Madison
Silver medal – second place	2026 Heusden-Zolder	Madison
European U23 Championships
Bronze medal – third place	2026 Cottbus	Omnium
European Junior Championships
Gold medal – first place	2025 Anadia	Individual pursuit
Gold medal – first place	2025 Anadia	Scratch race
Gold medal – first place	2025 Anadia	Elimination race
Silver medal – second place	2025 Anadia	Omnium
Bronze medal – third place	2025 Anadia	Points race

Ida Dam Fialla (born 13 August 2008) is a Danish junior road and track cyclist.

In June 2023, at the age of 14, Fialla participated in the senior elite Danish track cycling championships, winning the points, elimination, and scratch races.

In 2025, at the UEC European Track Championships, Fialla won gold in the scratch race, elimination race, and individual pursuit, where she set a world junior record time of 3:31.442.

== Major results ==
=== Road ===
2024
National Junior Championships

1st Time trial
5th Road race

2025
National Junior Championships

1st Time trial
1st Road race

9th Piccolo Trofeo Alfredo Binda

=== Track ===
2023
National Championships

1st Scratch race
1st Points race
1st Elimination race

2024
National Championships

3rd Scratch race
3rd Points race
3rd Elimination race

2025
World Junior Championships

1st Individual pursuit
2nd Omnium
2nd Madison

European Junior Championships

1st Individual pursuit
1st Scratch race
1st Elimination race
2nd Omnium
3rd Points race
