= 2026 UCI Track Cycling World Championships – Women's madison =

Women's madison at the 2026 UCI Track Cycling World Championships
- Venue: Shanghai Velodrome
- Location: Shanghai, China
- Dates: 17 October
- Competitors: 36 from 18 nations
- Teams: 18

Medalists
gold medal	Erin Boothman; Anna Morris	Great Britain
silver medal	Marion Borras; Clara Copponi	France
bronze medal	Maho Kakita; Tsuyaka Uchino	Japan

The Women's madison competition at the 2026 UCI Track Cycling World Championships was held on 17 October 2026.

== Results ==
The race was started at 18:17.

Rank	Name	Nation	Lap points	Sprint points	Finish order	Total points
1st place, gold medalist(s)	Erin Boothman; Anna Morris	Great Britain	20	20	12	40
2nd place, silver medalist(s)	Marion Borras; Clara Copponi	France	20	13	14	33
3rd place, bronze medalist(s)	Maho Kakita; Tsuyaka Uchino	Japan	0	18	2	18
4	Bryony Botha; Prudence Fowler	New Zealand	0	18	9	18
5	Amalie Dideriksen; Ida Fialla	Denmark	0	17	1	17
6	Chiara Consonni; Vittoria Guazzini	Italy	0	15	10	15
7	Shari Bossuyt; Lotte Kopecky	Belgium	0	14	3	14
8	Lisa van Belle; Lorena Wiebes	Netherlands	0	14	4	14
9	Michelle Andres; Aline Seitz	Switzerland	0	12	6	12
10	Maeve Plouffe; Alyssa Polites	Australia	−20	2	8	−18
11	Chen Ning; Gong Xianbing	China	−20	0	5	−20
12	Bethany Ingram; Megan Jastrab	United States	−20	0	7	−20
13	Eva Anguela; Isabella Escalera	Spain	−20	0	11	−20
14	Vendula Strakatá; Petra Ševčíková	Czech Republic	−20	0	13	−20
15	Wiktoria Pikulik; Olga Wankiewicz	Poland	−20	0	15	−20
16	Lee Sze Wing; Leung Wing Yee	Hong Kong	−20	0	17	−20
17	Messane Bräutigam; Lea Lin Teutenberg	Germany	−20	0	18	−20
18	Scarlet Cortés; Aranza Villalón	Chile	−40	0	16	−40
