= 2025 UCI Junior Track Cycling World Championships =

- Venue: Apeldoorn, Netherlands
- Date: 20–24 August
- Velodrome: Omnisport Apeldoorn

The 2025 UCI Junior Track Cycling World Championships were the 50th annual Junior World Championships for track cycling, held in Apeldoorn, Netherlands from 20 to 24 August.

The Championships had eleven events each for men and women (sprint, points race, individual pursuit, team pursuit, time trial, team sprint, keirin, madison, scratch race, omnium, elimination race).

== Medal summary ==
Event	Gold	Silver	Bronze
Men's events
Sprint	Choi Tae-ho; South Korea	Archie Gill; United Kingdom	Tomasz Łamaszewski; Poland
Points race	Eric Igual; Spain	Moritz Mauss; Germany	Ilya Slesarenko; Individual Neutral Athletes-2
Individual pursuit	Alessio Magagnotti; Italy	Eñaut Urcaregui; Spain	Daniel Thompson; United Kingdom
Team pursuit	Riccardo Colombo; Francesco Cornacchini; Alessio Magagnotti; Francesco Matteoli; Federico Saccani; Italy	Rory Gravelle; Max Hinds; Henry Hobbs; Daniel Thompson; Albie Jones; Great Britain	Lenny Karstedt; Hugo Esch; Attila Höfig; Victor Wedekind; Raul Esch; Germany
Time trial	Henry Hobbs; United Kingdom	Benjamin Bock; Germany	Alessio Magagnotti; Italy
Team sprint	Kristian Larigo; Archie Gill; Ioan Hepburn; Charlie Holt; Great Britain	Jaeho Jung; Taeho Choi; Minseong Kim; Wooju Jeon; South Korea	Maurice Steckel; Benjamin Bock; Leonidas Rekowski; Finn-Liam Petterson; Germany
Keirin	Choi Tae-ho; South Korea	Dmitrii Pavlovskii; Individual Neutral Athletes-1	Tomasz Łamaszewski; Poland
Madison	Eric Igual; Eñaut Urcaregui; Spain	Julian Bortolami; Riccardo Colombo; Italy	Max Hinds; Daniel Thompson; Great Britain
Scratch race	Nathan Marcoux; France	Moritz Mauss; Germany	Jacopo Vendramin; Italy
Omnium	Henry Hobbs; United Kingdom	Witse Bertels; Belgium	Jacopo Vendramin; Italy
Elimination race	Heimo Fugger; Austria	Jacopo Vendramin; Italy	Matvei Iakovlev; Individual Neutral Athletes-1

Event	Gold	Silver	Bronze
Women's events
Sprint	Veronika Solozobova; Individual Neutral Athletes-1	Zita Gheysens; Belgium	Matilde Cenci; Italy
Individual pursuit	Ida Fialla; Denmark	Emma Jimenez Palos; United States	Magdalena Leis; Germany
Time trial	Matilde Cenci; Italy	Emilia Waterstradt; Germany	Zita Gheysens; Belgium
Points race	Anna Dubier; Australia	Polina Danshina; Individual Neutral Athletes-1	Alexandra Fangeat; Canada
Keirin	Matilde Cenci; Italy	Valeria Hernández; Colombia	Emilia Waterstradt; Germany
Scratch race	Emma Jimenez Palos; United States	Auke De Buysser; Belgium	Yana Daniluk; Individual Neutral Athletes-2
Team sprint	Matilde Cenci; Rebecca Fiscarelli; Siria Trevisan; Agata Campana; Italy	Lara Colberg; Emilia Waterstradt; Amy Weber; Germany	Ella Liang; Ebony Robinson; Olivia Wright; Leani Van Der Berg; Australia
Team pursuit	Erin Boothman; Abigail Miller; Evie Smith; Phoebe Taylor; Arabella Blackburn; Great Britain	Elisa Bianchi; Alessia Orsi; Matilde Rossignoli; Linda Sanarini; Erja Giulia Bianchi; Italy	Magdalena Leis; Caoilinn Littbarski-Gray; Sophia Schrödel; Julia Servay; Sophie Schuster; Germany
Omnium	Polina Danshina; Individual Neutral Athletes-1	Ida Fialla; Denmark	Amelie Sanders; Australia
Madison	Erin Boothman; Phoebe Taylor; Great Britain	Mathilde Cramer; Ida Fialla; Denmark	Anna Dubier; Amelie Sanders; Australia
Elimination race	Chantal Pegolo; Italy	Mathilde Cramer; Denmark	Milana Ushakova; Ukraine

== Medal table ==
* Host nation (Netherlands)

Rank	Nation	Gold	Silver	Bronze	Total
1	Italy	6	3	4	13
2	Great Britain	5	2	2	9
–	Individual Neutral Athletes-1	2	2	1	5
3	South Korea	2	1	0	3
3	Spain	2	1	0	3
5	Denmark	1	3	0	4
6	United States	1	1	0	2
7	Australia	1	0	3	4
8	Austria	1	0	0	1
8	France	1	0	0	1
10	Germany	0	5	5	10
11	Belgium	0	3	1	4
12	Colombia	0	1	0	1
13	Poland	0	0	2	2
–	Individual Neutral Athletes-2	0	0	2	2
14	Canada	0	0	1	1
14	Ukraine	0	0	1	1
Totals (15 entries)		22	22	22	66
