= 2026 UCI Junior Track Cycling World Championships =

- Venue: Heusden-Zolder, Belgium
- Date: 19–23 August
- Velodrome: Sport Vlaanderen Heusden-Zolder Velodrome

The 2026 UCI Junior Track Cycling World Championships were the 51st annual Junior World Championships for track cycling, held in Heusden-Zolder, Belgium from 19 to 23 August. The city had previously hosted world championships for road cycling (1969, 2002), cyclo-cross (1970, 2002, 2016), and BMX (2015, 2019).

The Championships had eleven events each for men and women (sprint, points race, individual pursuit, team pursuit, time trial, team sprint, keirin, madison, scratch race, omnium, elimination race).

== Medal summary ==
=== Medal table ===
* Host nation (Belgium)

Rank	Nation	Gold	Silver	Bronze	Total
1	Italy	8	6	2	16
2	Individual Neutral Athletes	5	3	6	14
3	Great Britain	4	2	2	8
4	Germany	1	2	2	5
5	France	1	2	1	4
6	United States	1	2	0	3
7	Belarus	1	0	1	2
8	Canada	1	0	0	1
9	Belgium*	0	2	2	4
10	Switzerland	0	1	1	2
11	Denmark	0	1	0	1
11	New Zealand	0	1	0	1
13	Australia	0	0	1	1
13	Colombia	0	0	1	1
13	Czech Republic	0	0	1	1
13	South Korea	0	0	1	1
13	Spain	0	0	1	1
Totals (17 entries)		22	22	22	66

=== Men's ===
Event	Gold	Silver	Bronze
Men's events
Sprint	Ioan Hepburn; Great Britain	Matteo Ghirelli; Italy	Jeon Ha-jin; South Korea
Team sprint	Individual Neutral Athletes; Zakhar Mokeev; Artem Zybin; Mikhail Demish; Nikita Butenko	Great Britain; Kristian Larigo; Charlie Holt; Ioan Hepburn	Italy; Filippo Cusumano; Matteo Ghirelli; Alberto Veglia; Cesare Castellani
1 km time trial	Matteo Ghirelli; Italy	Leonidas Rekowski; Germany	Mikhail Demish; Individual Neutral Athletes
Keirin	Ioan Hepburn; Great Britain	Matteo Ghirelli; Italy	Mikhail Demish; Individual Neutral Athletes
Individual pursuit	Daniel Thompson; Great Britain	Zéphirin Le Normand-Lucas; France	Antoine Salamin; Switzerland
Team pursuit	Italy; Nicola Padovan; Ruben Ferrari; Paolo Marangon; Alberto Veglia; Lorenzo Ceccarello	Switzerland; Timothy Andreoli-Calcagni; Jann Salm; Noah Schnyder; Antoine Salamin	Great Britain; Toby Tombs; Albie Jones; Sam Martin; Daniel Thompson
Madison	Italy; Nicola Padovan; Jacopo Vendramin	Belgium; Sune De Valck; Cedric Van Gijsel	Belarus; Dzianis Baranouski; Ilya Yankouski
Omnium	Rostislav Novolodskii; Individual Neutral Athletes	Zéphirin Le Normand-Lucas; France	Sune De Valck; Belgium
Scratch race	Raul Esch; Germany	Jacopo Vendramin; Italy	James Canham; Great Britain
Points race	Matteo Maggioni; Italy	Riley Crampton; New Zealand	Tom Podevin; France
Elimination race	Jacopo Vendramin; Italy	James Canham; Great Britain	Matvei Iakovlev; Individual Neutral Athletes

=== Women's ===
Event	Gold	Silver	Bronze
Women's events
Sprint	Veronika Solozobova; Individual Neutral Athletes	Maya Ferrante; Italy	Manuela Loaiza; Colombia
Team sprint	Individual Neutral Athletes; Anastasiya Pershina; Veronika Solozobova; Viktoriia Luchina; Mariia Ermolova	Germany; Marie Louise Raake; Lara Colberg; Celine Prochnau; Mira Rosinski	Czech Republic; Ema Benešová; Kristýna Křupalová; Emílie Jarošová
1 km time trial	Angelina Shastak; Belarus	Maya Ferrante; Italy	Veronika Solozobova; Individual Neutral Athletes
Keirin	Maya Ferrante; Italy	Viktoriia Luchina; Individual Neutral Athletes	Celine Prochnau; Germany
Individual pursuit	Zoé Bihan; France	Emma Jimenez Palos; United States	Megan Moore; Australia
Team pursuit	Great Britain; Anna Lloyd; Phoebe Taylor; Gabriella McHugh; Mabli Phillips; Aelwen Davies	Belgium; Jana Gevers; Faye Lagaeysse; Yana Decruyenaere; Laura Five; Anna Meeusen	Italy; Elisa Bianchi; Maria Acuti; Azzurra Ballan; Linda Rapporti; Matilde Rossignoli
Madison	Italy; Agata Campana; Matilde Rossignoli	Denmark; Ida Fialla; Aia Marie Rasmussen	Individual Neutral Athletes; Olga Kostina; Angelina Novolodskaya
Omnium	Angelina Novolodskaya; Individual Neutral Athletes	Emma Jimenez Palos; United States	Anna Meeusen; Belgium
Scratch race	Emma Jimenez Palos; United States	Agata Campana; Italy	Angelina Novolodskaya; Individual Neutral Athletes
Points race	Eve Buczkowski; Canada	Olga Kostina; Individual Neutral Athletes	Charlotte Spath; Germany
Elimination race	Agata Campana; Italy	Olga Kostina; Individual Neutral Athletes	Adriana Vargas; Spain
