= Arabella Blackburn =

Scottish cyclist (born 2007)

Personal information
- Born: 25 December 2007 (age 18)

Cycling career
- Sport: Cycling
- Disciplines: Track; Road
- Role: Rider
- Rider type: Time Trial / All Rounder

Amateur team
- 2024-: Shibden Apex RT
Medal record
Women's track cycling
Representing Great Britain
World Junior Championships
Gold medal – first place	2025 Apeldoorn	Team pursuit
European Junior Championships
Gold medal – first place	2025 Anadia	Team pursuit

Arabella Blackburn (born 25 December 2007) is a Scottish road and track cyclist. She rides for Shibden Apex RT. She was a gold medalist in the team pursuit for Great Britain at the 2025 UCI Junior Track Cycling World Championships and the European Junior Track Cycling Championships in 2025.

== Career ==
From Stonehaven, Aberdeenshire in Scotland, Blackburn was educated at Lathallan School. A keen cyclist and triathlete from an early age, she won the U14 British Cycling National Youth Circuit Race Championships in 2021 and further titles at the Scottish Criterium and Scottish Cyclocross Championships as an U16 cyclist in 2022.

In 2024, she rode for Shibden Apex RT where her teammates included fellow British riders Cat Ferguson and Imogen Wolff.

Blackburn set a world junior record and won the gold medal at the 2025 European Junior Championships in Portugal in the Team Pursuit alongside Abi Miller, Evie Smith, Phoebe Taylor, and Erin Boothman, beating Italy in the final, and in doing so setting a junior world record with a time of 4:20:376. Blackburn won the gold medal in the team pursuit with Miller, Smith, Boothman and Taylor at the 2025 UCI Junior Track Cycling World Championships in Apeldoorn, Netherlands in August 2025.

She competed for Great Britain at the 2025 UCI Road World Championships junior women’s road race in Kigali, Rwanda in September 2025.
