= Angelina Novolodskaya =

Russian cyclist (born 2009)

Personal information
- Native name: Ангелина Новолодская
- Born: 23 July 2009 (age 17)

Cycling career
- Sport: Cycling
- Disciplines: Road; Track
- Role: Rider
Medal record
Women's track cycling
Representing Individual Neutral Athletes
World Junior Championships
Gold medal – first place	2026 Heusden-Zolder	Omnium
Bronze medal – third place	2026 Heusden-Zolder	Madison
Bronze medal – third place	2026 Heusden-Zolder	Scratch
European Junior Championships
Gold medal – first place	2026 Cottbus	Individual pursuit
Gold medal – first place	2026 Cottbus	Madison
Gold medal – first place	2026 Cottbus	Omnium
Women's road cycling
Representing Russia
Youth Olympic Games
Gold medal – first place	2026 Dakar	Road race
Bronze medal – third place	2026 Dakar	Time trial

Angelina Yuryevna Novolodskaya (Russian: Ангелина Юрьевна Новолодская; born 23 July 2009) is a Russian road and track cyclist. She is a World Junior Track Cycling Championships, European Junior Track Cycling Championships and Youth Olympic Games gold medalist.

== Career ==
In July 2026, she competed at the 2026 European Junior Track Championships and won gold medals in the individual pursuit, madison and omnium. The next month she competed competed at the 2026 UCI Junior Track Cycling World Championships and won a gold medal in the omnium.

In November 2026, she represented Russia at the 2026 Summer Youth Olympics and won a gold medal in the road race event with a time of 1:31:19. She also won a bronze medal in the time trial with a time of 11:43.65.

== Personal life ==
Novolodskaya has 11 siblings, including eight brothers and three sisters. All of her siblings are cyclists, including her older sister, Maria Novolodskaya, who won a bronze medal at the 2020 Summer Olympics.
