= Abi Miller =

British cyclist (born 2007)

- Miller in 2025

Personal information
- Full name: Abigail Miller
- Born: 25 November 2007 (age 18)

Cycling career
- Sport: Cycling
- Disciplines: Track; Road
- Role: Rider
- Rider type: Time Trial / All Rounder

Amateur team
- 2024-2025: Tofauti Everyone Active

Professional team
- 2026: UAE Development Team
Medal record
Women's track cycling
Representing Great Britain
World Junior Championships
| Gold medal – first place | 2025 Apeldoorn | Team pursuit |
European Junior Championships
| Gold medal – first place | 2025 Anadia | Team pursuit |
| Gold medal – first place | 2025 Anadia | Madison |

Abigail Miller (born 25 November 2007) is a British track and road cyclist who rides for the UAE Development Team. She was a gold medalist at the 2025 UCI Junior Track Cycling World Championships and won two gold medals at the European Junior Track Cycling Championships in 2025.

== Early life ==
Miller was born on 25 November 2007. She grew up in York and was educated at Fulford School. She began cycling at the age of seven with Clifton Cycling Club.

== Career ==
Miller raced on the road with the Tofauti Everyone Active Majaco Team in 2024 and 2025.

Miller set a world junior track record and won the gold medal at the 2025 European Junior Championships in Portugal in the Team Pursuit alongside Erin Boothman, Evie Smith, Phoebe Taylor, and Arabella Blackburn, beating Italy in the final, and in doing so setting a junior world record with a time of 4:20:376. Also at the championships, she won a gold medal in the Madison track cycling event alongside Boothman.

Miller won the gold medal in the team pursuit with Boothman, Arabella Blackburn, Evie Smith and Phoebe Taylor at the 2025 UCI Junior Track Cycling World Championships in Apeldoorn, Netherlands in August 2025. She competed for Great Britain at the 2025 UCI Road World Championships junior women’s road race in Kigali, Rwanda in September 2025.

Miller (middle) having won La Classique Morbihan in 2026

Miller rode for UAE Development Team in 2026 and had her first victory at the elite level on 8 May 2026 competing in France at La Classique Morbihan. At the age of 18 years-old she had been the youngest rider in the race. In June, competing in the 2026 U23 time trial at the British national championships, Miller placed third overall. In July, she competed for England at the 2026 Commonwealth Games in Glasgow. She competed for Great Britain at the 2026 UCI Track Cycling World Championships in China in October.
