= Evie Smith =

British cyclist (born 2007)

Personal information
- Born: 3 November 2007 (age 18)

Cycling career
- Sport: Cycling
- Disciplines: Track; Road
- Role: Rider
- Rider type: Time Trial / All Rounder

Amateur team
- 2024-: Shibden Apex RT
Medal record
Women's track cycling
Representing Great Britain
World Junior Championships
Gold medal – first place	2025 Apeldoorn	Team pursuit
European Junior Championships
Gold medal – first place	2025 Anadia	Team pursuit

Evie Smith (born 3 November 2007) is a British cyclist. She was a gold medalist at the 2025 UCI Junior Track Cycling World Championships and the European Junior Track Cycling Championships in 2025.

== Early life ==
From Birchencliffe, Huddersfield, she studied at Greenhead College having previously been educated at Lindley Junior School and Rastrick High School in West Yorkshire. She took up cycling before the age of 10 years-old when her parents took her to join Huddersfield Star Wheelers cycling club. She later went on to join Eastlands Sports Velo in Manchester.

== Career ==
In 2024, she rode for Shibden Apex RT where her teammates included fellow British riders Cat Ferguson and Imogen Wolff.

She set a world junior track record and won the gold medal at the 2025 European Junior Championships in Portugal in the Team Pursuit alongside Erin Boothman, Abi Miller, Pheobe Taylor, and Arabella Blackburn, beating Italy in the final, and in doing so setting a junior world record with a time of 4:20:376.

She won the gold medal in the team pursuit with Boothman, Arabella Blackburn, Miller and Phoebe Taylor at the 2025 UCI Junior Track Cycling World Championships in Apeldoorn, Netherlands in August 2025.
