= 2026 UEC European Track Championships – Women's team pursuit =

Women's team pursuit at the 2026 UEC Track Elite European Championships
- Venue: Konya Velodrome, Konya
- Date: 1–2 February
- Competitors: 45 from 10 nations
- Teams: 10
- Winning time: 4:02.808

Medalists
gold medal	Katie Archibald; Josie Knight; Anna Morris; Millie Couzens; Kate Richardson	Great Britain
silver medal	Mieke Kröger; Lisa Klein; Laura Süßemilch; Franziska Brauße	Germany
bronze medal	Elisa Balsamo; Letizia Paternoster; Federica Venturelli; Linda Sanarini	Italy

The women's team pursuit competition at the 2026 UEC European Track Championships was held on 1 and 2 February 2026.

== Results ==
=== Qualifying ===
The eight fastest teams advanced to the first round.

Rank	Nation	Time	Behind	Notes
1	Germany; Mieke Kröger; Lisa Klein; Laura Süßemilch; Franziska Brauße	4:06.509		Q
2	Italy; Elisa Balsamo; Letizia Paternoster; Federica Venturelli; Linda Sanarini	4:07.365	+0.856	Q
3	Great Britain; Josie Knight; Anna Morris; Kate Richardson; Millie Couzens	4:07.447	+0.938	Q
4	France; Clara Copponi; Victoire Berteau; Mélanie Dupin; Ilona Rouat	4:13.800	+7.291	Q
5	Belgium; Lotte Kopecky; Katrijn De Clercq; Luca Vierstraete; Hélène Hesters	4:14.648	+8.139	q
6	Switzerland; Michelle Andres; Lorena Leu; Annika Liehner; Jasmin Liechti	4:15.003	+8.494	q
7	Ireland; Aoife O'Brien; Fiona Mangan; Erin Creighton; Esther Wong	4:21.973	+15.464	q
8	Netherlands; Steffie van der Peet; Mischa Bredewold; Sofie van Rooijen; Yuli van der Molen	4:25.505	+18.996	q
9	Poland; Patrycja Lorkowska; Tamara Szalińska; Eliza Rabażyńska; Martyna Szczęsna	4:26.054	+19.545	
10	Serbia; Marija Pavlović; Nikolija Kulinčević; Irina Stevanović; Natalija Vasiljević	6:02.798	+1:56.289	

=== First round ===
First round heats were held as follows:
Heat 1: 7th v 8th fastest
Heat 2: 5th v 6th fastest
Heat 3: 2nd v 3rd fastest
Heat 4: 1st v 4th fastest

The winners of heats 3 and 4 proceeded to the gold medal race. The remaining six teams were ranked on time, from which the top two proceeded to the bronze medal race.

Heat	Rank	Nation	Time	Notes
1	1	Ireland; Emma Jeffers; Fiona Mangan; Erin Creighton; Esther Wong	4:20.538	
1	2	Netherlands; Steffie van der Peet; Mischa Bredewold; Sofie van Rooijen; Yuli van der Molen	4:24.010	
2	1	Switzerland; Michelle Andres; Aline Seitz; Lorena Leu; Jasmin Liechti	4:12.094	
2	2	Belgium; Shari Bossuyt; Katrijn De Clercq; Luca Vierstraete; Hélène Hesters	4:12.150	
3	1	Great Britain; Katie Archibald; Josie Knight; Anna Morris; Millie Couzens	4:03.634	QG, WR
3	2	Italy; Elisa Balsamo; Letizia Paternoster; Federica Venturelli; Linda Sanarini	4:06.796	QB
4	1	Germany; Mieke Kröger; Lisa Klein; Laura Süßemilch; Franziska Brauße	4:06.109	QG
4	2	France; Clara Copponi; Victoire Berteau; Valentine Fortin; Mélanie Dupin	4:09.498	QB

=== Finals ===
Rank	Nation	Time	Behind	Notes
Gold medal final
1st place, gold medalist(s)	Great Britain; Katie Archibald; Josie Knight; Anna Morris; Millie Couzens	4:02.808		WR
2nd place, silver medalist(s)	Germany; Mieke Kröger; Lisa Klein; Laura Süßemilch; Franziska Brauße	4:05.448	+2.640	
Bronze medal final
3rd place, bronze medalist(s)	Italy; Elisa Balsamo; Letizia Paternoster; Federica Venturelli; Linda Sanarini	4:09.961		
4	France; Victoire Berteau; Valentine Fortin; Mélanie Dupin; Ilona Rouat	4:12.619	+2.658	
