= Ioan Hepburn =

British cyclist (born 2008)

Personal information
- Born: 31 March 2008 (age 18)

Cycling career
- Sport: Cycling
- Discipline: Track
- Role: Rider
Medal record
Men's track cycling
Representing Great Britain
World Junior Championships
Gold medal – first place	2025 Apeldoorn	Team sprint
Gold medal – first place	2026 Heusden-Zolder	Sprint
Gold medal – first place	2026 Heusden-Zolder	Keirin
Silver medal – second place	2026 Heusden-Zolder	Team sprint
European Junior Championships
Gold medal – first place	2025 Anadia	Team sprint

Ioan Hepburn (born 31 March 2008) is a British cyclist from Wales. He won gold medals in the team sprint competition at both the 2025 Junior World Championships and 2025 European Junior Championships.

== Career ==
From Cross Ash, Monmouthshire, he was educated at Monmouth Comprehensive School. Hepburn started racing downhill mountain bikes at the age eight years-old. However, following a crash, he lost a kidney at the age of 13 years-old in 2021. His talent for riding was first spotted while he was using a watts bike at the Usk Agricultural Show. He then became part of the Wales Racing Academy.

Hepburn won the gold medal in the team sprint making his debut for Great Britain at the 2025 UEC European Junior Track Championships in Anadia, Portugal in July 2025. The following month, Hepburn won the gold medal in the team sprint competition at the 2025 UCI Junior Track Cycling World Championships in Apeldoorn, Netherlands.

Hepburn was named in the Wales team for the 2026 Commonwealth Games in Glasgow. Competing at the Games he was part of the Wales team that qualified for the bronze race against Trinidad and Tobago in the team sprint, however he was forced to pull out prior to the start of the race due to ill health.
