= Phoebe Taylor =

Phoebe Taylor may refer to:

- Phoebe Atwood Taylor, American writer of mystery novels
- Phoebe Taylor (cyclist), British track cyclist
