= Fencing at the 2026 Summer Youth Olympics – Women's foil =

Women's foil at the IV Summer Youth Olympic Games
- Venue: Dakar Expo Center
- Dates: 8 November
- Competitors: 12 from 12 nations

Medalists
1st place, gold medalist(s)		Uliana Belykh	Russia
2nd place, silver medalist(s)		Sara Amr Hossny	Egypt
3rd place, bronze medalist(s)		Lena Mayerl	Austria

The women's foil competition at the 2026 Summer Youth Olympics was held on 8 November at the Dakar Expo Center.

== Results ==
=== Pool round ===
==== Pool 1 ====
Seed	Athlete	(Senegal)	(Austria)	(Morocco)	(Jordan)	(Egypt)	(Australia)	V	B	V/B	HS	HR	Diff.	RP	RT
9	Marieme Sow (SEN)		2	1	2	1	0	0	5	0.000	6	25	−19	6	12
5	Lena Mayerl (AUT)	V		V	V	3	V	4	5	0.800	23	14	9	2	4
12	Hiba Zaimi (MAR)	V	0		0	0	1	1	5	0.200	6	21	−15	5	10
8	Celine Abu Obeid (JOR)	V	3	V		0	V	3	5	0.600	18	15	3	3	5
4	Sara Amr Hossny (EGY)	V	V	V	V		V	5	5	1.000	25	6	19	1	1
1	Rianne Leung (AUS)	V	4	V	3	2		2	5	0.400	19	16	3	4	7

==== Pool 2 ====
Seed	Athlete	(Russia)	(Malaysia)	(Poland)	(Bahrain)	(New Zealand)	(Moldova)	V	B	V/B	HS	HR	Diff.	RP	RT
2	Uliana Belykh (RUS)		V	3	V	V	V	4	5	0.800	23	9	14	1	2
11	Nur Qalesha Mohd Radzuan (MAS)	3		0	V	V	3	2	5	0.400	16	19	−3	4	8
3	Danuta Tym (POL)	V4	V		V	V	2	4	5	0.800	21	9	12	2	3
7	Ritej Araoud (BHR)	2	3	1		V	V	2	5	0.400	16	21	−5	5	9
10	Bowie Wang (NZL)	0	1	2	3		1	0	5	0.000	7	25	−18	6	11
6	Sanda Dubolari (MDA)	0	V	V3	3	V		3	5	0.600	16	16	0	3	6

=== Elimination round ===
Round of 16
9 Ritej Araoud (BHR)	9
8 Nur Qalesha Mohd Radzuan (MAS)	15
5 Celine Abu Obeid (JOR)	15
12 Marieme Sow (SEN)	3
11 Bowie Wang (NZL)	13
6 Sanda Dubolari (MDA)	15
7 Rianne Leung (AUS)	15
10 Hiba Zaimi (MAR)	3

Quarterfinals
1 Sara Amr Hossny (EGY)	15
8 Nur Qalesha Mohd Radzuan (MAS)	6
5 Celine Abu Obeid (JOR)	5
4 Lena Mayerl (AUT)	15
3 Danuta Tym (POL)	15
6 Sanda Dubolari (MDA)	5
7 Rianne Leung (AUS)	6
2 Uliana Belykh (RUS)	15

Semifinals
1 Sara Amr Hossny (EGY)	15
4 Lena Mayerl (AUT)	11
3 Danuta Tym (POL)	3
2 Uliana Belykh (RUS)	15

Final
1 Sara Amr Hossny (EGY)	8
2 Uliana Belykh (RUS)	15
Third place
4 Lena Mayerl (AUT)	15
3 Danuta Tym (POL)	11
