= Luca Vierstraete =

Belgian cyclist

- Vierstraete in 2025

Personal information
- Born: 22 May 2006 (age 20) Kortrijk, Belgium

Cycling career
- Sport: Cycling
- Current team: AG Insurance Soudal Devo Team
- Disciplines: Road; Track
- Role: Rider
- Rider type: Time trialist

Amateur team
- 2023–2024: AG Insurance–Soudal Quick-Step U19 Team

Professional team
- 2025–: AG Insurance–Soudal U23
Medal record
Representing Belgium
Women's road cycling
World Championships
Bronze medal – third place	2026 Montreal	Under-23 time trial
European Road Championships
Bronze medal – third place	2025 Guilherand-Granges	Under-23 time trial
Women's track cycling
European Under-23 Championships
Silver medal – second place	2026 Cottus	Individual pursuit
Bronze medal – third place	2025 Anadia	Points race
Bronze medal – third place	2025 Anadia	Team pursuit
European Junior Championships
Silver medal – second place	2024 Cottus	Individual pursuit

Luca Vierstraete (born 22 May 2006) is a Belgian racing cyclist, who currently rides for UCI Continental team AG Insurance Soudal Devo Team. She won a bronze medal in the under-23 time trial at the 2026 UCI Road World Championships.

== Major results ==
=== Road ===
2023
1st Time trial, National Junior Championships
2024
1st Chrono des Nations Junior
4th Time trial, National Junior Championships
8th Time trial, UEC European Junior Championships
2025
1st Time trial, National Under-23 Championships
3rd Time trial, UEC European Under-23 Championships
8th Overall Tour de Feminin

1st Stage 1 (TTT)

2026
1st Time trial, National Under-23 Championships
1st Stage 1 (TTT) Tour de Feminin
3rd Time trial, UCI Under-23 Road World Championships
