= Cycling at the 2023 European Youth Summer Olympic Festival =

- Road cycling logo
- Dates: 25–27 July 2023

Cycling at the 2023 European Youth Summer Olympic Festival held in Maribor, Slovenia, from 25 to 27 July 2023.

== Cycling Road ==
=== Medal table ===
* Host nation (Slovenia)

Rank	Nation	Gold	Silver	Bronze	Total
1	Netherlands	2	0	1	3
2	Great Britain	1	1	0	2
2	Italy	1	1	0	2
4	Ireland	0	1	0	1
4	Spain	0	1	0	1
6	Austria	0	0	1	1
6	Germany	0	0	1	1
6	Poland	0	0	1	1
Totals (8 entries)		4	4	4	12

=== Medalists ===
Event	Gold	Silver	Bronze
Boys' Road Race	Max Hinds; Great Britain	Alessio Magagnotti; Italy	Heimo Fugger; Austria
Girls' Road Race	Linda Sanarini; Italy	Paula Jessica Ostiz; Spain	Maria Okrucińska; Poland
Boys' Time Trial	Gijs Schoonvelde; Netherlands	Conor Murphy; Ireland	Benedikt Benz; Germany
Girls' Time Trial	Megan Arens; Netherlands	Erin Boothman; Great Britain	Jente Koops; Netherlands

== Mountain biking ==
Mountain biking at the 2023 European Youth Summer Olympic Festival
- Venue: Maribor Skatepark, Maribor
- Dates: 26 July 2023
- Competitors: 57

=== Medal table ===
* Host nation (Slovenia)

Rank	Nation	Gold	Silver	Bronze	Total
1	Czech Republic	1	0	0	1
1	Switzerland	1	0	0	1
3	France	0	1	0	1
3	Germany	0	1	0	1
5	Austria	0	0	1	1
5	Slovenia*	0	0	1	1
Totals (6 entries)		2	2	2	6

=== Medalists ===
Event	Gold	Silver	Bronze
Boys' Cross Country	Kryštof Bažant; Czech Republic	Elias Hückmann; Germany	Valentin Hofer; Austria
Girls' Cross Country	Anja Grossmann; Switzerland	Lise Revol; France	Maruša Tereza Šerkezi; Slovenia
