= Linda Sanarini =

Italian cyclist (born 2007)

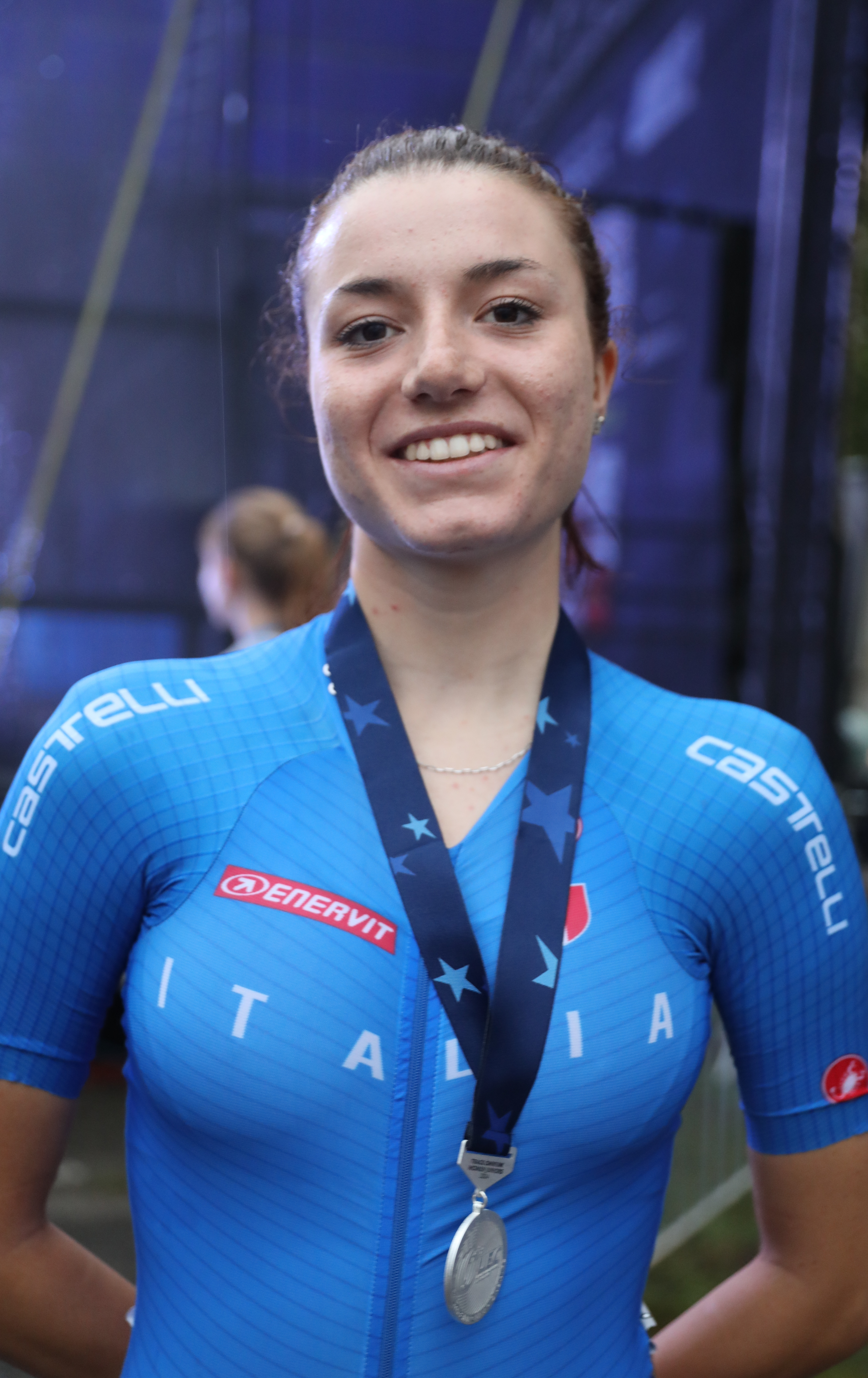
- Sanarini in 2024

Personal information
- Born: 12 January 2005 (age 21) Abano Terme, Italy

Cycling career
- Sport: Cycling
- Current team: Tirol Women Cycling
- Disciplines: Track; Road

Amateur team
- 2024–2025: Bft Burzoni VO2 Team Pink

Professional team
- 2026–: Tirol Women Cycling
Medal record
Representing Italy
Women's track cycling
European Championships
Bronze medal – third place	2026 Konya	Team pursuit

Linda Sanarini (born 18 January 2007) is an Italian track and road cyclist. She was a bronze medalist in the Team Pursuit at the 2026 UEC European Track Championships. Prior to that, she won multiple medals at Junior World and European Track Championships, and won the road race at the 2023 European Youth Olympic Festival.

== Biography ==
Sanarini was born 18 January 2007, in Abano Terme and later lived in Saccolongo, Padua. In 2021, she became Italian age-group road champion. On the track, she won the Italian age-group title in the Omnium at the Italian Youth Championships in San Giovanni al Natisone. In 2022, she won the Italian age-group time trial title in Friuli, and three titles on the track: in the Team Pursuit, Omnium, and Madison, in Dalmine.

She competed for Italy at the 2023 European Youth Olympic Festival in Maribor, Slovenia, winning the girls' road race. That year, she signed for Bft Burzoni VO2 Team Pink Junior Women's team.

At the 2024 UCI Junior Track Cycling World Championships in Luoyang, China, she won bronze medals in the Team Pursuit and Madison (alongside Anita Baima), also placing fifth in the Omnium. At the 2024 UEC European Track Junior Championships in Cottbus, she won the silver medal in the Omnium and a bronze medal in the Team Pursuit.

She was a medalist in the Team Pursuit at the 2025 UCI Junior Track Cycling World Championships in Apeldoorn, Netherlands, and the 2025 UEC European Junior Track Championships in Anadia, Portugal.

In February 2026, Sanarini won a bronze medal with the Italian team at the 2026 UEC European Track Championships in Konya, Turkey, in the women's team pursuit.
