= Henry Hobbs (cyclist) =

British cyclist (born 2007)

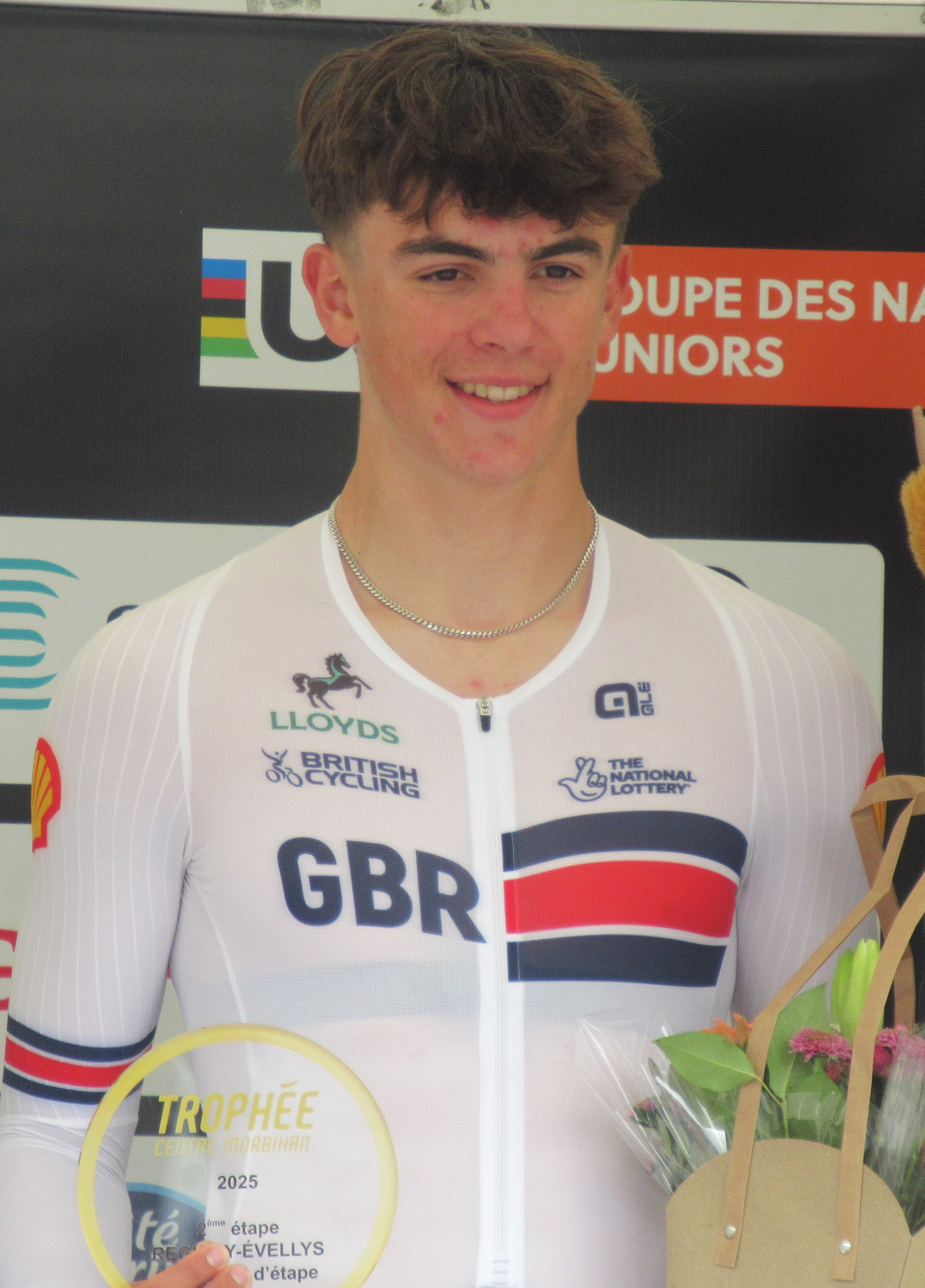
- Hobbs in 2025

Personal information
- Born: 20 May 2007 (age 19)

Cycling career
- Sport: Cycling
- Discipline: Track
- Role: Rider
Medal record
Men's track cycling
Representing Great Britain
World Championships
Bronze medal – third place	2026 Shanghai	Team pursuit
European Championships
Bronze medal – third place	2026 Konya	Team pursuit
World Junior Championships
Gold medal – first place	2024 Luoyang	Individual pursuit
Gold medal – first place	2025 Apeldoorn	1 km time trial
Gold medal – first place	2025 Apeldoorn	Omnium
Silver medal – second place	2024 Luoyang	1 km time trial
Silver medal – second place	2025 Apeldoorn	Team pursuit
Bronze medal – third place	2024 Luoyang	Team pursuit
European Junior Championships
Gold medal – first place	2025 Anadia	Individual pursuit
Silver medal – second place	2025 Anadia	Team pursuit
Bronze medal – third place	2024 Cottbus	Team pursuit
Representing England
Commonwealth Games
Gold medal – first place	2026 Glasgow	Team pursuit
Gold medal – first place	2026 Glasgow	Scratch race
Bronze medal – third place	2026 Glasgow	Elimination race

Henry Hobbs (born 20 May 2007) is a British cyclist. He is a three-time junior world champion in track cycling disciplines. He won the individual pursuit at the 2024 UCI Junior Track Cycling World Championships, before winning both the kilometre time trial and the omnium at the 2025 edition in Apeldoorn. He is the 2025 junior European champion in the individual pursuit.

== Early and personal life ==
The brother of cyclist Noah Hobbs, he attended Woodbridge High School in Woodford Green, London, and raced for Barking & Dagenham Cycling Club.

== Career ==
Hobbs competed at the British Cycling National Track Championships as a 16 year-old in February 2024, and won bronze in the men’s kilometre time trial, clocking a personal best time of 1:02.574, and finishing just four tenths of a second from the gold medal. That week, he was selected to join the British Cycling junior academy.

In August 2024, Hobbs won the individual pursuit at the 2024 UCI Junior Track Cycling World Championships. He also win silver in the 1 km time trial and bronze in the team pursuit at the Championships held in Luoyang, China.

Hobbs won the gold medals in the omnium and in the 1 km time trial at the 2025 UCI Junior Track Cycling World Championships in Apeldoorn, Netherlands in August 2025. At the championships he also won the silver medal in the team pursuit alongside Rory Gravelle, Max Hinds, Dan Thompson and Albie Jones.

At the 2026 Commonwealth Games in Glasgow, Hobbs alongside Will Tidball, Charlie Tanfield and Ethan Vernon won the men's team pursuit, beating Australia in the final on 30 July. One day later, he won a bronze medal in the elimination race and on 1 August won the gold medal in the 10 km scratch race. In September 2026, Hobbs secured a pro win on roads on stage five of the ZLM Tour in the Netherlands, part of the UCI ProSeries, in his debut race representing the Visma–Lease a Bike elite team. He finished 17th overall in the stage race despite being the fourth youngest rider on the start list. In October, he won the bronze medal representing Great Britain in the team pursuit at the 2026 UCI Track Cycling World Championships in Shanghai, riding alongside his brother Noah, as well as Ethan Vernon and Ollie Wood.

== Major results ==
=== Road ===
2024
7th Guido Reybrouck Classic

1st Youth classification

2025
1st Stage 2a (ITT) Trophée Centre Morbihan
2nd Nokere Koerse Juniors
6th Kuurne–Brussels–Kuurne Juniors
8th Paris–Roubaix Juniors
8th Guido Reybrouck Classic
2026 (1 pro win)
1st Stage 5 ZLM Tour
1st Stage 2 Oberösterreich Rundfahrt
2nd Time trial, National Under-23 Championships

=== Track ===
2024
UCI World Junior Championships

1st Individual pursuit
2nd Kilo
3rd Team pursuit

2025
UCI World Junior Championships

1st Kilo
1st Omnium
2nd Team pursuit

2026
Commonwealth Games

1st Team pursuit
1st Scratch
3rd Elimination

3rd Team pursuit, UCI World Championships
