= 2026 UCI Track Cycling World Championships – Men's team pursuit =

Men's team pursuit at the 2026 UCI Track Cycling World Championships
- Venue: Shanghai Velodrome
- Location: Shanghai, China
- Dates: 14–15 October
- Competitors: 75 from 18 nations
- Teams: 18
- Winning time: 3:40.865

Medalists
gold medal	Carl-Frederik Bévort; Lasse Norman Leth; Frederik Rodenberg Madsen; Rasmus Pedersen; Tobias Hansen	Denmark
silver medal	Filippo Ganna; Francesco Lamon; Alessio Magagnotti; Jonathan Milan	Italy
bronze medal	Noah Hobbs; Henry Hobbs; Ethan Vernon; Oliver Wood; Matthew Bostock	Great Britain

The men's team pursuit competition at the 2026 UCI Track Cycling World Championships was held on 14 and 15 October 2026.

== Results ==
=== Qualifying ===
The qualifying was started on 14 October at 12:29. The eight fastest teams advanced to the first round.

Rank	Nation	Time	Behind	Notes
1	Denmark; Tobias Hansen; Carl-Frederik Bévort; Frederik Rodenberg Madsen; Rasmus Pedersen	3:44.991		Q
2	Great Britain; Noah Hobbs; Henry Hobbs; Matthew Bostock; Ethan Vernon	3:47.154	+2.163	Q
3	Italy; Filippo Ganna; Francesco Lamon; Alessio Magagnotti; Jonathan Milan	3:47.272	+2.281	Q
4	Australia; Blake Agnoletto; Thomas Cornish; Conor Leahy; James Moriarty	3:48.797	+3.806	Q
5	New Zealand; George Jackson; Keegan Hornblow; Marshall Erwood; Daniel Morton	3:50.218	+5.227	Q
6	Germany; Max-David Briese; Tim Torn Teutenberg; Moritz Binder; Benjamin Boos	3:50.995	+6.004	Q
7	United States; Ashlin Barry; Grant Koontz; Anders Johnson; Taylor Phinney	3:51.029	+6.038	Q
8	France; Valentin Tabellion; Erwan Besnier; Mathieu Dupé; Benjamin Thomas	3:51.617	+6.626	Q
9	China; Sun Haijiao; Pei Zhengyu; Sun Wentao; Yang Yang	3:52.171	+7.180	
10	Canada; Chris Ernst; Mathias Guillemette; Carson Mattern; Campbell Parrish	3:52.642	+7.651	
11	Japan; Kanta Umezawa; Naoki Kojima; Kazushige Kuboki; Shoi Matsuda	3:53.453	+8.462	
12	Switzerland; Pascal Tappeiner; Alex Vogel; Mats Poot; Noah Bögli	3:53.815	+8.824	
13	Belgium; Witse Bertels; Tuur Dens; Gianluca Pollefliet; Noah Vandenbranden	3:54.376	+9.385	
14	Kazakhstan; Ilya Karabutov; Alisher Zhumakan; Ramis Dinmukhametov; Dmitriy Noskov	3:56.510	+11.519	
15	Individual Neutral Athletes; Ilya Savekin; Lev Gonov; Grigorii Skorniakov; Daniil Zarakovskiy	3:57.583	+12.592	
16	Spain; Xavier Cañellas; Joan Martí Bennassar; Francesc Bennassar; Beñat Garaiar	3:58.930	+13.939	
17	Hong Kong; Chu Tsun Wai; Mow Ching Yin; Ng Pak Hang; Tso Kai Kwong	4:03.442	+18.451	
18	Indonesia; Julian Abi Manyu; Yosandy Darmawan Oetomo; Muhammad Andy Royan; Terry Yudha Kusuma	4:14.852	+29.861	

=== First round ===
The first round was started on 14 October at 19:17.

First round heats were held as follows:
Heat 1: 7th v 8th fastest
Heat 2: 5th v 6th fastest
Heat 3: 2nd v 3rd fastest
Heat 4: 1st v 4th fastest

The winners of heats three and four advanced to the gold medal race. The remaining six teams were ranked on time, from which the top two proceeded to the bronze medal race.

Rank	Heat	Nation	Time	Notes
1	1	France; Valentin Tabellion; Oscar Nilsson-Julien; Mathieu Dupé; Benjamin Thomas	3:49.619	QB
2	1	United States; Ashlin Barry; Grant Koontz; Anders Johnson; Taylor Phinney	3:50.916	
1	2	New Zealand; George Jackson; Keegan Hornblow; Marshall Erwood; Daniel Morton	3:50.590	
2	2	Germany; Max-David Briese; Tim Torn Teutenberg; Moritz Binder; Benjamin Boos	3:51.449	
1	3	Italy; Filippo Ganna; Francesco Lamon; Alessio Magagnotti; Jonathan Milan	3:45.332	QG
2	3	Great Britain; Noah Hobbs; Henry Hobbs; Matthew Bostock; Ethan Vernon	3:46.967	QB
1	4	Denmark; Carl-Frederik Bévort; Lasse Norman Leth; Frederik Rodenberg Madsen; Rasmus Pedersen	3:44.043	QG
2	4	Australia; Blake Agnoletto; Thomas Cornish; Conor Leahy; James Moriarty	3:49.634	

=== Finals ===
The finals were started on 15 October at 18:00.

Rank	Nation	Time	Behind	Notes
Gold medal race
1st place, gold medalist(s)	Denmark; Carl-Frederik Bévort; Lasse Norman Leth; Frederik Rodenberg Madsen; Rasmus Pedersen	3:40.865		
2nd place, silver medalist(s)	Italy; Filippo Ganna; Francesco Lamon; Alessio Magagnotti; Jonathan Milan	3:45.596	+4.732	
Bronze medal race
3rd place, bronze medalist(s)	Great Britain; Noah Hobbs; Henry Hobbs; Ethan Vernon; Oliver Wood	3:47.245		
4	France; Valentin Tabellion; Oscar Nilsson-Julien; Mathieu Dupé; Benjamin Thomas	3:50.351	+3.106	
