= Erin Boothman =

British cyclist (born 2007)

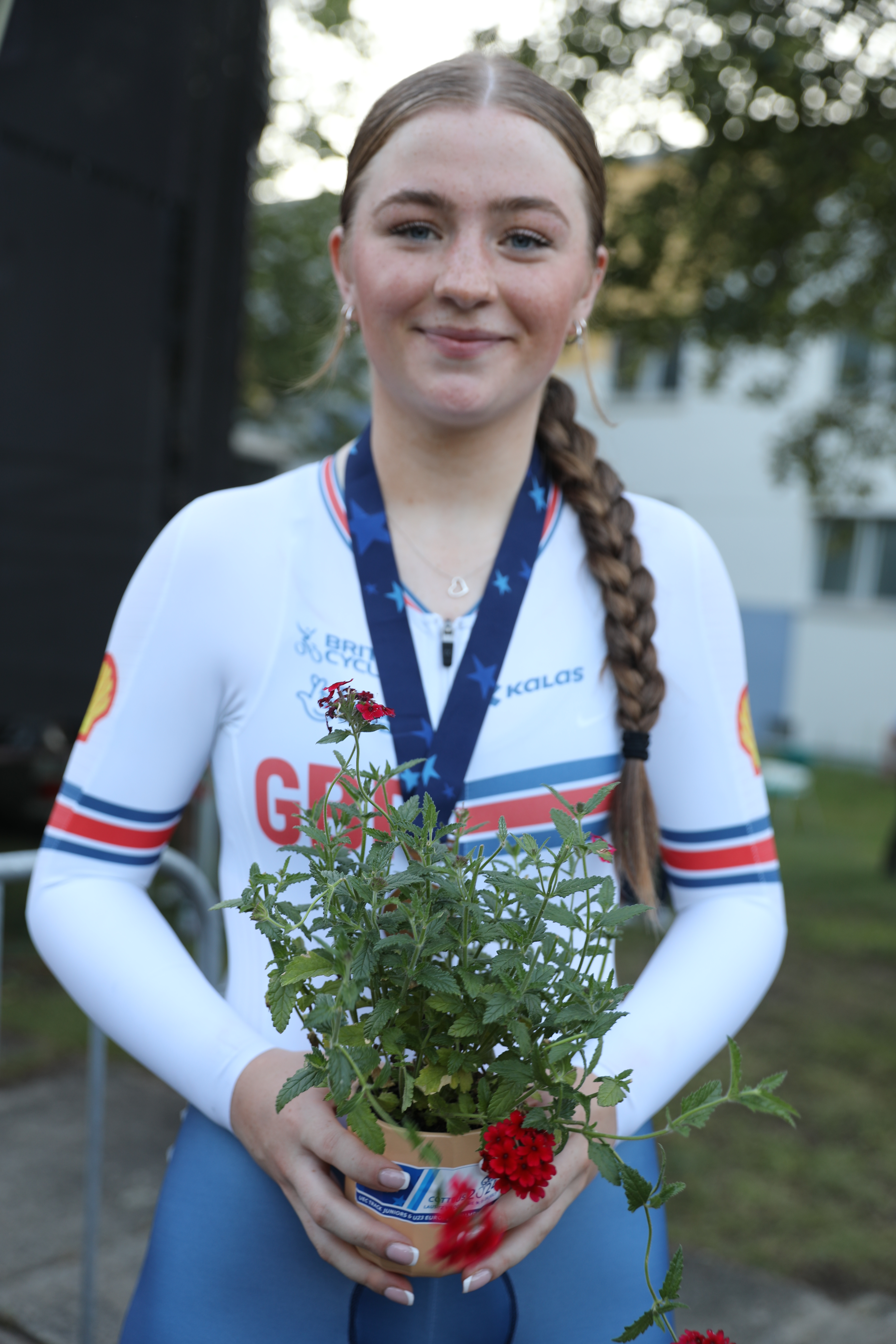
- Boothman in 2024

Personal information
- Born: 24 April 2007 (age 19)

Cycling career
- Sport: Cycling
- Disciplines: Track; Road
- Role: Rider
- Rider type: Time Trial / All Rounder

Amateur team
- 2024-: Tofauti Everyone Active

Major wins
- Track World Championships Madison (2026) Team pursuit (2026)
Medal record
Women's track cycling
Representing Great Britain
World Championships
Gold medal – first place	2026 Shanghai	Team pursuit
Gold medal – first place	2026 Shanghai	Madison
World Junior Championships
Gold medal – first place	2024 Luoyang	Team pursuit
Gold medal – first place	2024 Luoyang	Madison
Gold medal – first place	2025 Apeldoorn	Team pursuit
Gold medal – first place	2025 Apeldoorn	Madison
European Junior Championships
Gold medal – first place	2025 Anadia	1 km time trial
Gold medal – first place	2025 Anadia	Team pursuit
Gold medal – first place	2025 Anadia	Madison
Silver medal – second place	2024 Cottbus	Team pursuit
Bronze medal – third place	2024 Cottbus	Elimination
Representing Scotland
Commonwealth Games
Bronze medal – third place	2026 Glasgow	Individual pursuit
Bronze medal – third place	2026 Glasgow	Scratch race

Erin Boothman (born 24 April 2007) is a Scottish cyclist. She won two gold medals at the 2026 UCI Track Cycling World Championships at the age of 19. Previously, she had won two gold medals at the 2024 UCI Junior Track Cycling World Championships and two more at the 2025 edition. Boothman also won three European Junior Track Cycling Championships gold medals in 2025.

== Early life ==
From Netherlee in East Renfrewshire, Scotland, she attended Williamwood High School in Clarkston, East Renfrewshire. Both her parents are engineers. She joined her first cycling club around the age of nine. When she was 12 she won a three-stage race in Donegal, Ireland. Also a keen netball player, she joined British Cycling's development pathway as an under-16 rider. She received an unconditional offer to study pharmacy at the University of Strathclyde, but deferred the offer to pursue cycling. She also rode as a member of East Kilbride RC.

== Career ==
She placed second in the under-16 women's category at the British Youth Track Cycling Championships in 2022. The following year she won the National Youth Omnium Championship. She won silver in the time trial at the 2023 European Youth Summer Olympic Festival in Maribor.

Alongside Cat Ferguson, Imogen Wolff and Carys Lloyd she won silver in the junior team pursuit at the 2024 UEC European Track Championships in Cottbus in July 2024. 24 hours later she won bronze in the elimination race at the Championships.

She won two gold medals at the 2024 UCI Junior Track Cycling World Championships in Luoyang, China. As part of the British women's team pursuit team alongside Cat Ferguson, Carys Lloyd and Imogen Wolff she set a new world record time of 4:20.811 to beat France in the final. She also won the Madison alongside Lloyd at the Championships in August 2024.

She set a world junior record and won the gold medal at the 2025 European Junior Championships in Portugal in the Team Pursuit alongside Abi Miller, Evie Smith, Phoebe Taylor, and Arabella Blackburn, beating Italy in the final, and in doing so setting a junior world record with a time of 4:20:376. Also at the championships, she won a gold medal in the Madison track cycling event alongside Miller.

Riding for Tofauti Everyone Active, she won the Gent–Wevelgem junior race and Clásica de Jaén in 2025. On the road she also won the junior British time trial title. On the track, she set a world junior record in the 3 km individual pursuit at the British Junior Track Championships.

Boothman won the gold medals in the Madison, alongside Phoebe Taylor, and in the team pursuit with Abi Miller, Arabella Blackburn, Evie Smith and Taylor at the 2025 UCI Junior Track Cycling World Championships in Apeldoorn, Netherlands in August 2025. She competed for Great Britain at the 2025 UCI Road World Championships junior women's road race in Kigali, Rwanda in September 2025. In December 2025, she won the Scottish national 4 km individual pursuit title ahead of Arabella Blackburn, her time of 4:34.848 breaking the Scottish record by 18 seconds.

In 2025, she signed a pro contract with Liv AlUla Jayco to join their development team in 2026 ahead of a move to the elite squad in 2027. In February 2026, Boothman placed third overall in the individual pursuit at the British Track Cycling Championships. Later at the championships, she won the elimination race, finishing ahead of Anna Morris and Katie Archibald. At the 2026 Track Cycling World Cup in Hong Kong, Boothman won a silver medal in the team pursuit, before winning another silver in the madison with Maddie Leech. Later that month, she won her first professional road race at the Grand Prix Elsy Jacobs in Luxembourg. In June, Boothman won the 2026 U23 time trial at the British national championships, with a time that would have placed her third in the senior event.

On 31 July 2026, Boothman won two bronze medals in a single day at the 2026 Commonwealth Games in Glasgow, defeating defending champion Bryony Botha of New Zealand in the bronze medal race in the 4000 m individual pursuit, and in the 10 km scratch race final. In October, she won the gold medal representing Great Britain in the team pursuit at the 2026 UCI Track Cycling World Championships in Shanghai, later winning a second gold medal in the women's madison alongside Anna Morris. The gold medal winning team pursuit of Boothman, Morris, Millie Couzens and Josie Knight were subsequently nominated for Team of the Year by The Sunday Times at the Sportswoman of the Year Awards.

== Major results ==
=== Road ===
2025
1st Time trial, National Junior Championships
1st Gent-Wevelgem Juniors
1st Clásica de Jaén Juniors
1st Stage 1 (TTT) Giro della Toscana
5th Time trial, UCI World Junior Championships
5th Piccolo Trofeo Alfredo Binda
2026
1st Time trial, National Under-23 Championships

=== Track ===
2024
UCI World Junior Championships

1st Madison (with Carys Lloyd)
1st Team pursuit

UEC European Junior Championships

2nd Team pursuit
3rd Elimination

2025
UCI World Junior Championships

1st Madison (with Phoebe Taylor)
1st Team pursuit

3rd Scratch, National Championships
2026
UCI World Championships

1st Madison (with Anna Morris)
1st Team pursuit

National Championships

1st Elimination
3rd Individual pursuit

UCI World Cup

2nd Team pursuit, Hong Kong
2nd Madison, Hong Kong (with Maddie Leech)

Commonwealth Games

3rd Individual pursuit
3rd Scratch
