= Phoebe Taylor (cyclist) =

British cyclist (born 2008)

Personal information
- Born: 22 July 2008 (age 18)

Cycling career
- Sport: Cycling
- Disciplines: Track; Road
- Role: Rider
- Rider type: Time Trial / All Rounder

Amateur team
- 2025-: Shibden Apex RT
Medal record
Women's track cycling
Representing Great Britain
World Junior Championships
Gold medal – first place	2025 Apeldoorn	Team pursuit
Gold medal – first place	2025 Apeldoorn	Madison
Gold medal – first place	2026 Heusden-Zolder	Team pursuit
European Junior Championships
Gold medal – first place	2025 Anadia	Team pursuit
Silver medal – second place	2026 Cottbus	Individual pursuit
Silver medal – second place	2026 Cottbus	Scratch
Bronze medal – third place	2026 Cottbus	Madison

Phoebe Taylor (born 22 July 2008) is a British track cyclist. She was a double gold medalist at the 2025 UCI Junior Track Cycling World Championships and also was a gold medalist at the European Junior Track Cycling Championships in 2025.

== Career ==
From Inskip, Lancashire, Taylor began cycling in Preston with Red Rose Olympic CC. She joined Eastlands Velo CC in 2019.

She set a junior track world record and won the gold medal at the 2025 European Junior Championships in Portugal in the Team Pursuit alongside Abi Miller, Evie Smith, Erin Boothman, and Arabella Blackburn, beating Italy in the final, and in doing so setting a junior world record with a time of 4:20:376.

Taylor won the gold medals in the Madison, alongside Boothman, and in the team pursuit with Abi Miller, Arabella Blackburn, Evie Smith and Boothman at the 2025 UCI Junior Track Cycling World Championships in Apeldoorn, Netherlands in August 2025.
