= Velódromo Alcides Nieto Patiño =

Velodrome in Cali, Colombia

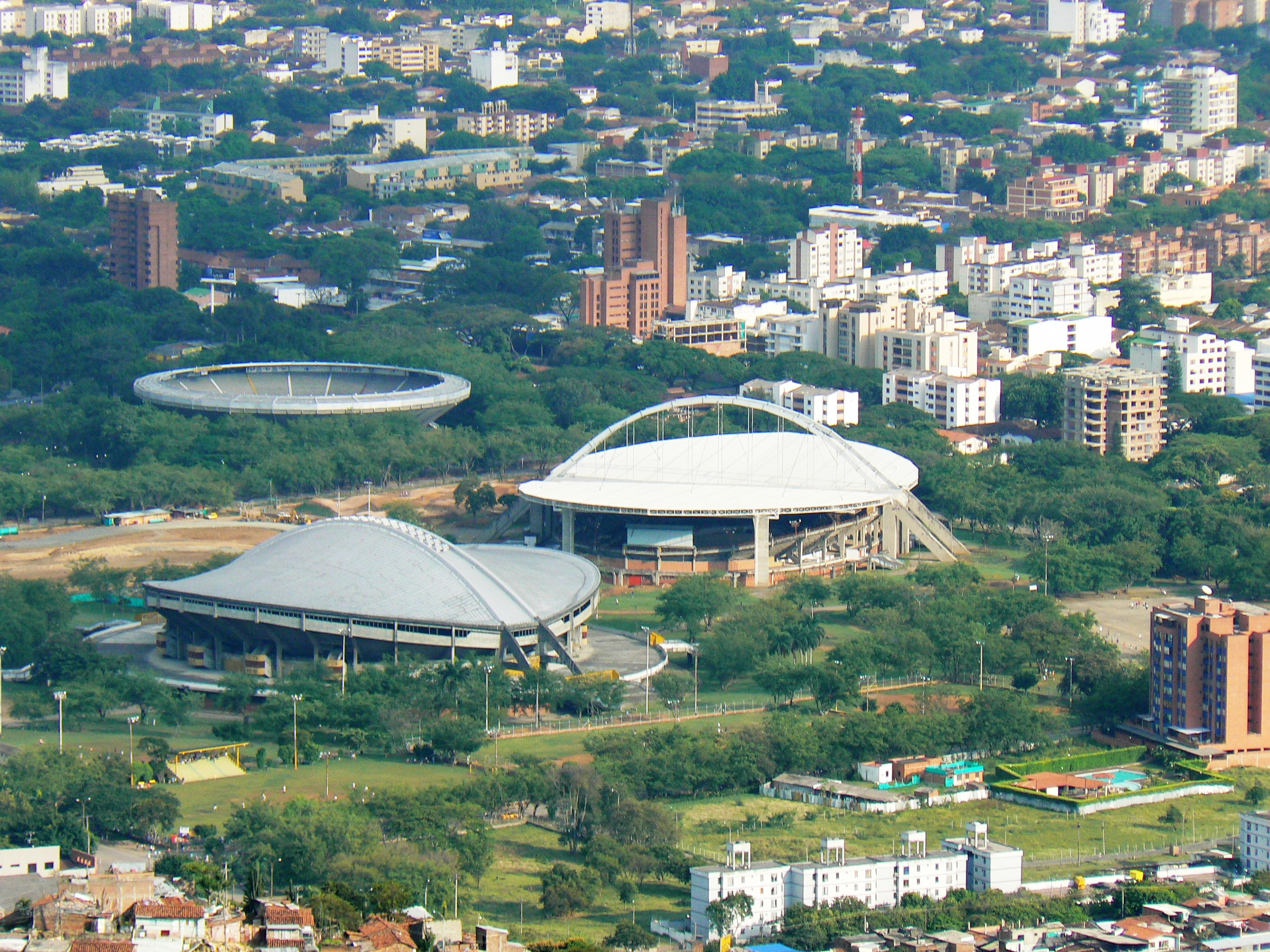

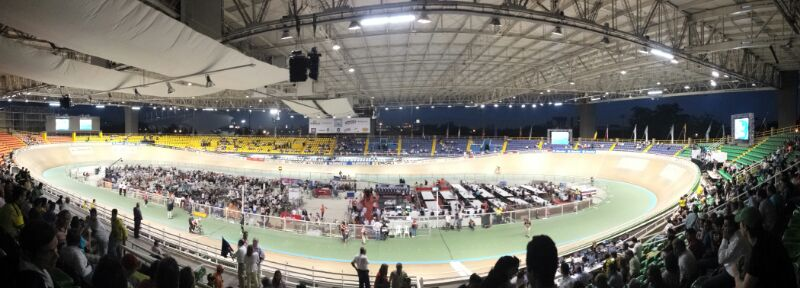
- Interactive map of Velódromo Alcides Nieto Patiño
- Location: Cali, Colombia
- Coordinates: 3°24′41″N 76°33′3″W
- Capacity: 7,650
- Surface: Wood
- Field size: 250 m (270 yd) track

Construction
- Built: 1970–1971
- Opened: 1971
- Renovated: 2007

The Velódromo Alcides Nieto Patiño is a velodrome in Cali, Colombia. It was opened in 1971 and renovated in 2007. It is a regular location for the UCI Track Cycling World Cup and hosted the 2014 UCI Track Cycling World Championships. The venue hosted the 2023 UCI Junior Track Cycling World Championships on 23–27 August.

== See also ==
- List of cycling tracks and velodromes

Preceded by Minsk-Arena; Minsk	UCI Track Cycling World Championships; Venue; 2014	Succeeded by Vélodrome de Saint-Quentin-en-Yvelines; Montigny-le-Bretonneux, Paris
