= Azzurra Ballan =

Italian cyclist (born 2008)

Personal information
- Born: 11 August 2008 (age 18)

Cycling career
- Sport: Cycling
- Discipline: road
- Role: Rider

Amateur teams
- 2024: UC Giorgione
- 2025-: Breganze Millenium
Medal record
Representing Italy
Women's road bicycle racing
European Championships
Gold medal – first place	2026 Ljubljana	Junior road race
Gold medal – first place	2026 Ljubljana	Junior mixed relay
World Junior Championships
Bronze medal – third place	2026 Heusden-Zolder	Team pursuit

Azzurra Ballan (born 11 August 2008) is an Italian road and track cyclist. She won the women’s junior race at the 2026 European Road Championships. She is the daughter of Alessandro Ballan.

== Career ==
Ballan participated in gymnastics and horse riding before focusing on cycling. Ballan had a third place finish in her age-group at the Italian time trial championship in 2024. She rode that year for UC Giorgione, claiming the first victory for the newly formed team that year.

In 2025 and 2026, she stepped up from the youth ranks into the juniors and rode for Breganze Millenium. Ballan was a bronze medalist in the team pursuit competing for Italy at the 2026 UCI Junior Track Cycling World Championships in Heusden-Zolder, Belgium. She won the women’s junior race at the 2026 European Road Championships in Ljubljana, Slovenia, winning in a sprint finish from a four-woman breakaway. Later that week, she was also part of the Italian Junior Mixed Team Relay that won the gold medal at the Championships.

== Personal life ==
From the Veneto region, she was named after the Italian national jersey. Born in August 2008, she is the daughter of Alessandro Ballan, who dedicated a stage victory to her shortly after her birth, at the 2008 Vuelta a España.
