= Messane Bräutigam =

German track cyclist

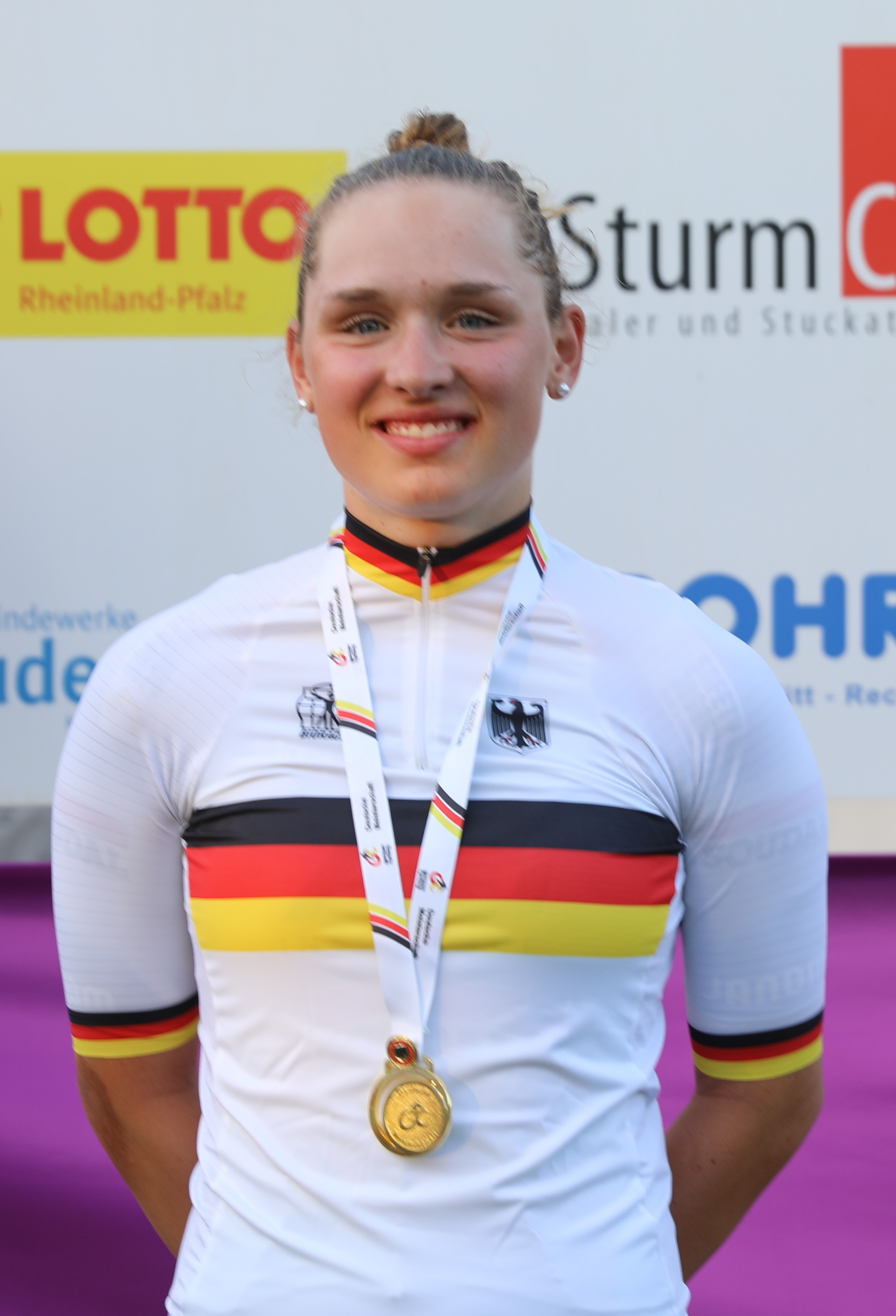
- Bräutigam in 2025

Personal information
- Born: 11 April 2006 (age 20)

Cycling career
- Sport: Cycling
- Discipline: Track
- Role: Rider
Medal record
Women's track cycling
Representing Germany
World Championships
| Silver medal – second place | 2025 Santiago | Team pursuit |
| Bronze medal – third place | 2026 Shanghai | Team pursuit |
European Under-23 Championships
| Gold medal – first place | 2025 Anadia | Madison |
| Gold medal – first place | 2025 Anadia | Scratch race |
World Junior Championships
| Gold medal – first place | 2024 Luoyang | Elimination race |
| Silver medal – second place | 2024 Luoyang | Madison |
European Junior Championships
| Gold medal – first place | 2024 Cottbus | Team pursuit |

Messane Bräutigam (born 11 April 2006) is a German track cyclist. She was a silver medalist at the 2025 UCI Track Cycling World Championships in the women's team pursuit.

== Career ==
At the 2024 European Junior Track Cycling Championships in Cottbus, she won the gold medal in the women's team pursuit. At the 2024 UCI Junior Track Cycling World Championships in Luoyang, China, she became junior world champion in the elimination race. She also won a silver medal in the madison at the championships, alongside Judith Rottmann. Competing at the European Road Championships in Belgium in September 2024, she finished second in the junior women's road race behind Dutchwoman Puck Langenbarg.

From January 2025, she rode for the development team of the UCI Women's WorldTeam AG Insurance–Soudal. In March 2025, Bräutigam and Lea Lin Teutenberg had a second-place finish in the women's madison competition at the UCI Track Nations Cup in Konya, Turkey. She won five medals at the 2025 German Track Cycling Championships in Dudenhofen, winning the madison and the points race as well as the scratch and elimination races, with a second place finish in the team pursuit.

In October 2025, she won a silver medal at the 2025 UCI Track Cycling World Championships in the women's team pursuit in Santiago, Chile. Riding alongside Lisa Klein, Franziska Brausse, and Laura Sussemilch they qualified for the final and finished as runner-up to the Italy team.

== Personal life ==
She is born in Jena and grew up in Berg (Pfalz). Now, she lives in Bad Bergzabern in the Südliche Weinstraße region of Rhineland-Palatinate.
