= Alessio Magagnotti =

Italian cyclist (born 2007)

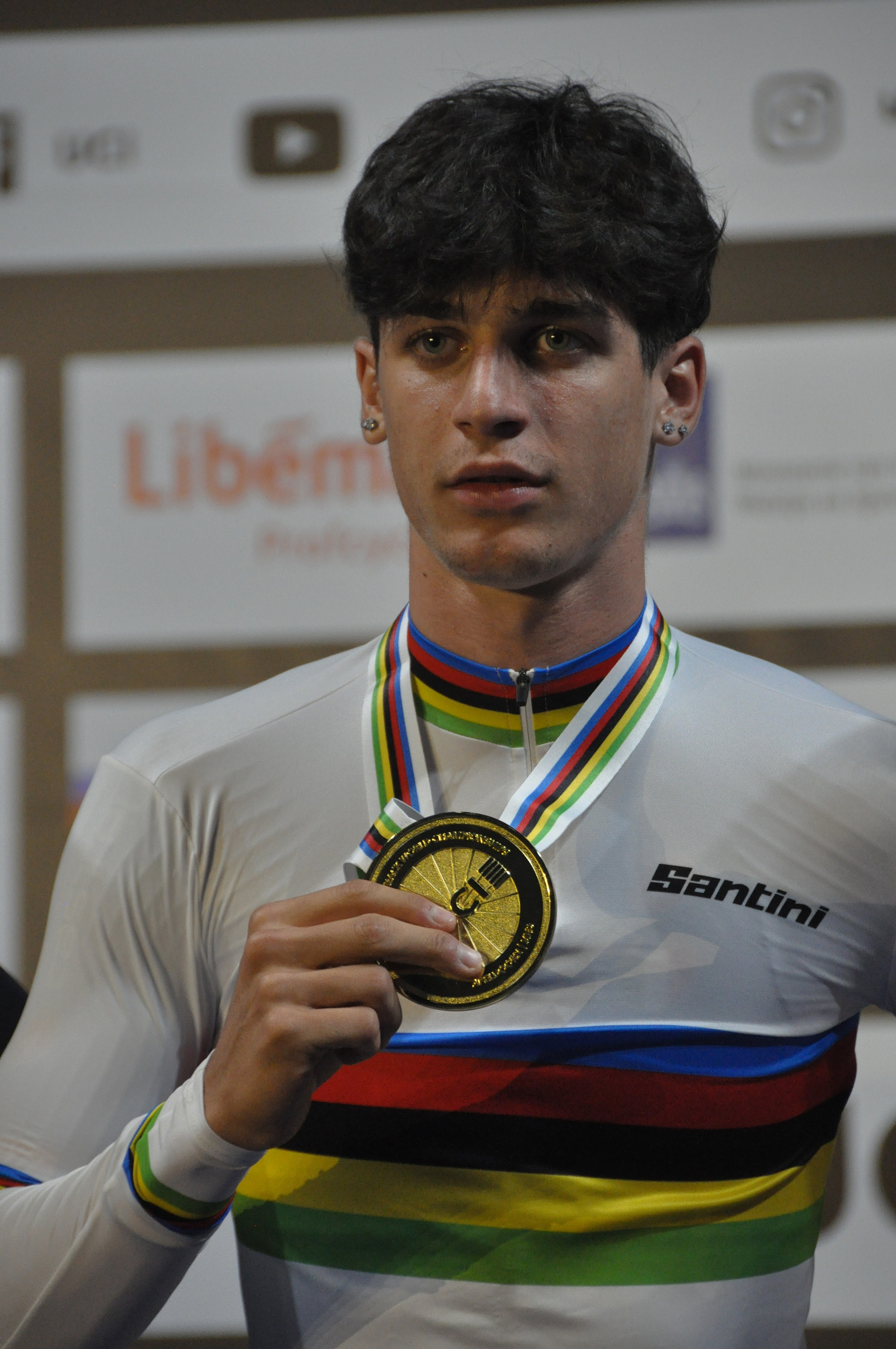
- Magagnotti at the 2025 UCI Junior Track Cycling World Championships

Personal information
- Born: 27 January 2007 (age 19)
- Height: 1.81 m (5 ft 11 in)
- Weight: 73 kg (161 lb)

Cycling career
- Sport: Cycling
- Current team: Red Bull–Bora–Hansgrohe Rookies
- Disciplines: Road; Track
- Rider type: Sprinter

Amateur team
- 2024–2025: Autozai–Contri

Professional team
- 2026–: Red Bull–Bora–Hansgrohe Rookies
Medal record
Representing Italy
Men's track cycling
World Championships
Silver medal – second place	2026 Shanghai	Team pursuit
World Junior Championships
Gold medal – first place	2024 Luoyang	Team pursuit
Gold medal – first place	2025 Apeldoorn	Individual pursuit
Gold medal – first place	2025 Apeldoorn	Team pursuit

Alessio Magagnotti (born 27 January 2007) is an Italian track and road cyclist. He is a three time gold medalist at the UCI Junior Track Cycling World Championships.

== Career ==
Magagnotti started cycling at age 8, after initially playing football. As a junior, he won silver in the road race at the 2023 European Youth Summer Olympic Festival. After winning stages in junior races Course de la Paix and Giro della Lunigiana, Magagnotti signed with Red Bull–Bora–Hansgrohe joining their development team.

In 2026, Magagnotti debuted as a professional. At his first elite race, the Trofeo Palma, he finished third in a sprint finish behind teammate Arne Marit, who won the race. At the Deutschland Tour, Magagnotti took his first professional victory on stage 2, beating stage favorite Paul Magnier.

== Major results ==
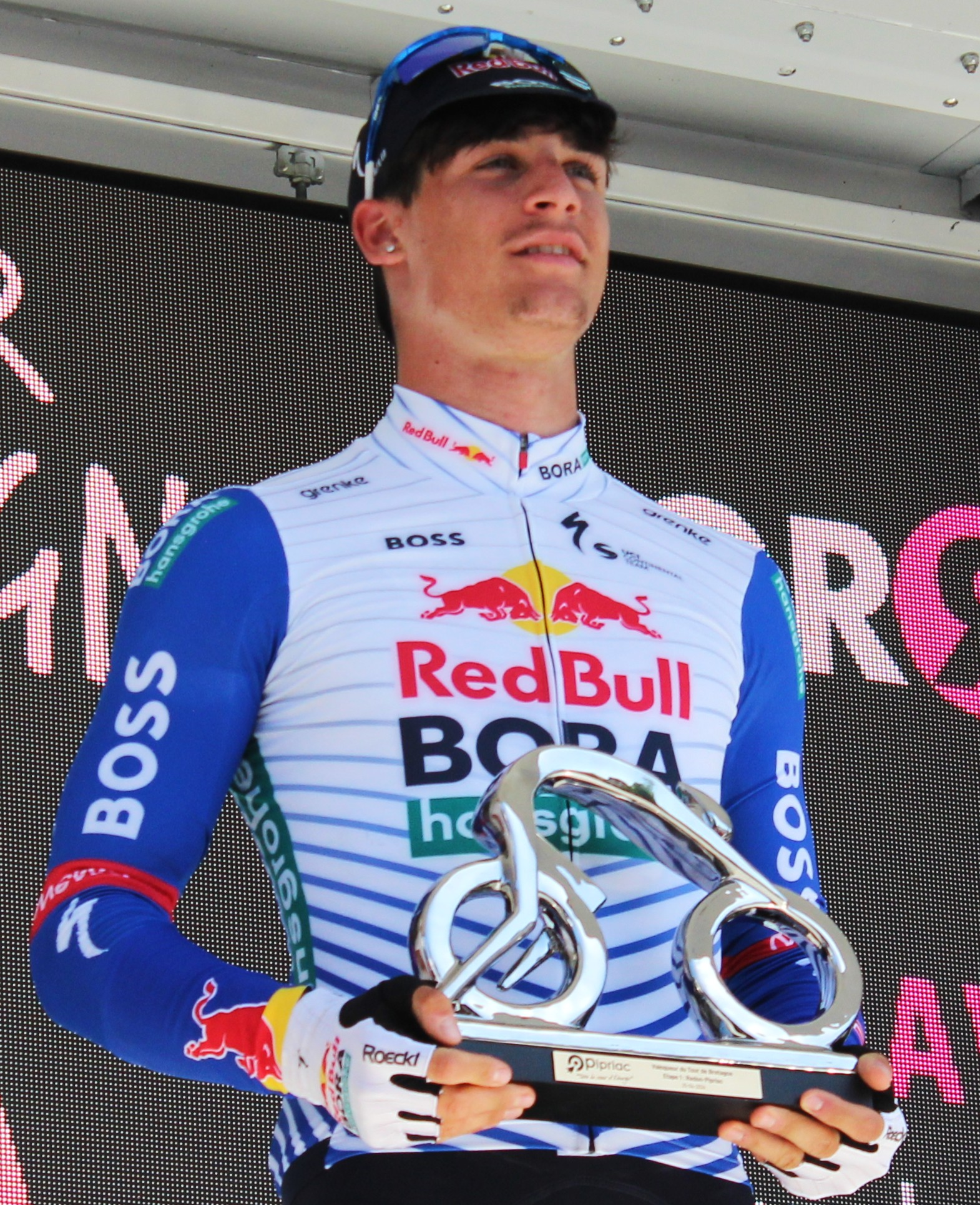
Magagnotti after winning stage 1 of the 2026 Tour de Bretagne

=== Road ===
2023
2nd Road race, European Youth Summer Olympic Festival
2024
5th Overall Saarland Trofeo

1st Points classification
1st Stages 2 & 3b

2nd Gran Premio del Perdono
5th Liberazione Juniores
2025
1st Trofeo Emozione
Course de la Paix Juniors

1st Points classification
1st Stage 2b

1st Stage 3a Giro della Lunigiana
1st Stage 1b Gran Premio FWR Baron
5th Trofeo Comune di Vertova
10th Trofeo Emilio Paganessi
2026 (1 pro win)
Tour de Bretagne

1st Stages 1 & 3

Istrian Spring Tour

1st Points classification
1st Stage 3

1st Stage 2 Deutschland Tour
3rd Trofeo Palma
4th Classique Dunkerque
9th Rund um Köln

=== Track ===
2024
UCI World Junior Championships

1st Team pursuit
3rd Individual pursuit

1st Team pursuit, UEC European Junior Championships
2025
UCI World Junior Championships

1st Team pursuit
1st Individual pursuit

1st Team pursuit, UEC European Junior Championships
2026
2nd Team pursuit, UCI World Championships
