= Bahrain at the 2026 Summer Youth Olympics =

- Flag of Bahrain
- IOC code: BRN
- NOC: Bahrain Olympic Committee
- Website: www.boc.bh

in Dakar, Senegal October 31, 2026 – November 13, 2026
- Competitors: 4 in 3 sports
- Flag bearers: Sara Alqarooni & Ali Ali
- Medals: Gold 0 Silver 0 Bronze 0 Total 0

Summer Youth Olympics appearances
- 2010; 2014; 2018; 2026

Bahrain is scheduled to compete at the 2026 Summer Youth Olympics in Dakar, Senegal from October 31 to November 13, 2026. This will mark Bahrain's fourth appearance at the Youth Olympics, after making its debut in 2010.

Swimmers Sara Alqarooni and Ali Ali served as the flag bearers for the opening ceremony.

== Competitors ==
The following is the list of number of competitors participating at the Games per sport/discipline.

Sport	Men	Women	Total
Beach wrestling	1	0	1
Fencing	0	1	1
Swimming	1	1	2
Total	2	2	4

== Beach wrestling ==
Bahrain entered one male athlete.

Men

Athlete	Weight	Round of 16	Quarterfinals	Semifinals	Final / BM	
Athlete	Weight	Opposition Result	Opposition Result	Opposition Result	Opposition Result	Rank
Ali Zaman	–90 kg					

== Fencing ==
Bahrain entered one female athlete.

Athlete	Event	Round of 64	Round of 32	Round of 16	Quarterfinal	Semifinal	Final / BM	
Athlete	Event	Opposition Score	Opposition Score	Opposition Score	Opposition Score	Opposition Score	Opposition Score	Rank
Ritej Araoud	Women's foil							

== Swimming ==
Bahrain entered two swimmers, one male and one female.

Athlete	Event	Heat		Semifinal		Final	
Athlete	Event	Time	Rank	Time	Rank	Time	Rank
Ali Ali	50 m freestyle						
Ali Ali	100 m freestyle						
Ali Ali	50 m butterfly						
Sara Alqarooni	50 m freestyle						
Sara Alqarooni	50 m butterfly						
Sara Alqarooni	100 m butterfly						
