= Omnium =

Track cycling competition

An omnium (from Latin omnium: of all, belonging to all) is a multiple race event in track cycling. Historically, the omnium has had a variety of formats. Starting in 2017, the omnium has consisted of four events: scratch race, tempo race, elimination race and points race. In the case of the para omnium in para-track cycling, introduced in 2020, the four events are Flying 200m, Time trial (1 km or 500 m), Individual pursuit and Scratch race. In recent years, road racing has also adopted the term to describe multi-day races that feature the three primary road race events (time trial, mass start and criterium).

== History ==
The omnium was re-introduced into the World Championships as a five-race track cycling format for men in 2007 and for women in 2009. The omnium was changed in 2010 by the UCI to include the elimination race and the distances of the events were lengthened to favour endurance cyclists.

The omnium replaced the individual pursuit and the points race at the Summer Olympic Games beginning in 2012. The change received some criticism from cyclist Rebecca Romero, who was left unable to defend her Olympic title.

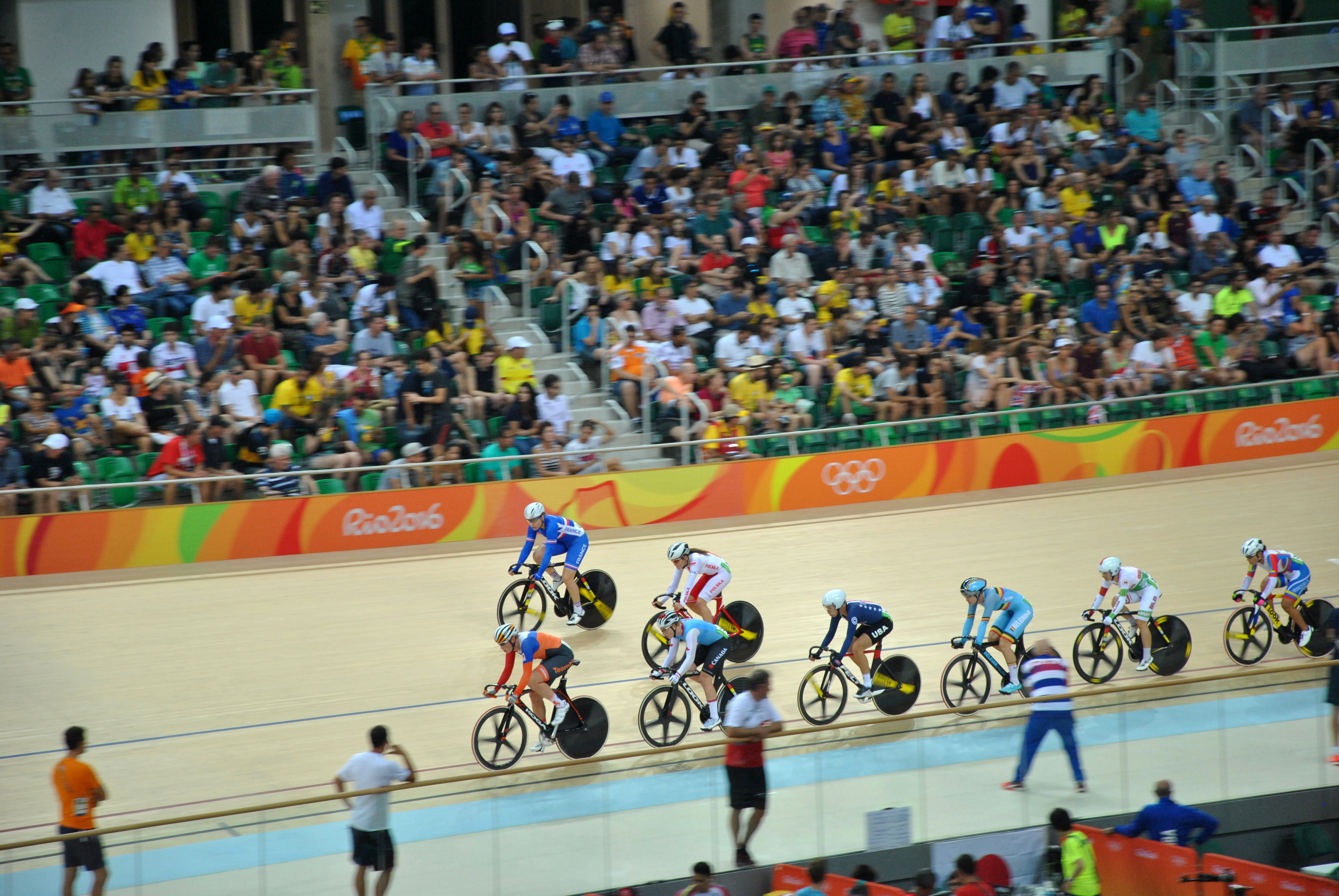
Omnium scratch race at the Rio Olympics

From June 2014 until the end of 2016, the omnium as defined by the Union Cycliste Internationale (UCI) consisted of the following six events held over 2 days:

1. Scratch race
2. Individual pursuit
  4,000 metres for elite men, 3,000 metres for junior men and elite women, and 2,000 metres for junior women
3. Elimination race
4. Time trial
  1 km men, 500 metres women
5. Flying lap (against the clock)
6. Points race
  40 km for elite men, 25 km for elite women, 25 km for junior men, 20 km for junior women

For the first five events, each winner was awarded 40 points, each second place 38 points, each third place 36, etc. Riders ranked 21st and below will each be awarded 1 point. In the Points Race, riders add to and lose points from their totals based on laps gained and lost, and points won in sprints.

=== Current omnium ===
After the 2016 season, the three timed events – the sprint time trial, flying lap and individual pursuit were all removed from the event, a tempo race added, and the event shortened to a single day. The points race as final race format remains with minor modifications.

1. Scratch race
  10 km for elite men, 7.5 km for elite women and junior men, 5 km for junior women
2. Tempo race
  10 km for elite men, 7.5 km for elite women and junior men, 5 km for junior women
3. Elimination race
  2 laps per sprint on 250 m tracks
4. Points race
  25 km for elite men, 20 km for elite women and junior men, 15 km for junior women

The winner of the Omnium is the rider who has obtained the highest total of points. In the event of a tie in the final ranking, the places in the final sprint of the last event, the Points Race breaks the tie.

A rider must have completed every event in the omnium, otherwise they are ranked last.

=== Para omnium ===
A para omnium in para-track cycling was introduced in 2020, featuring four events:

1. Flying 200 m
2. Time trial – 1 km or 500 m
3. Individual pursuit
4. Scratch race

Individual events except the flying 200 m may be held as part of the stand-alone events, with only the omnium participants eligible for omnium points.

Points are awarded in a similar manner to the first five events in the regular omnium.

== Road racing omnium ==
A road race omnium consists of a time trial, a criterium, and a mass-start road race – typically held across a weekend or other 2-3 day period. Points are awarded to the top finishers at each event and totalled at the end of the event. The overall winner for the event is chosen based on the number of accumulated points. Often, organisers will stipulate that riders must complete each event in order to qualify for the overall prize.
