= Elimination race =

Type of bicycle race

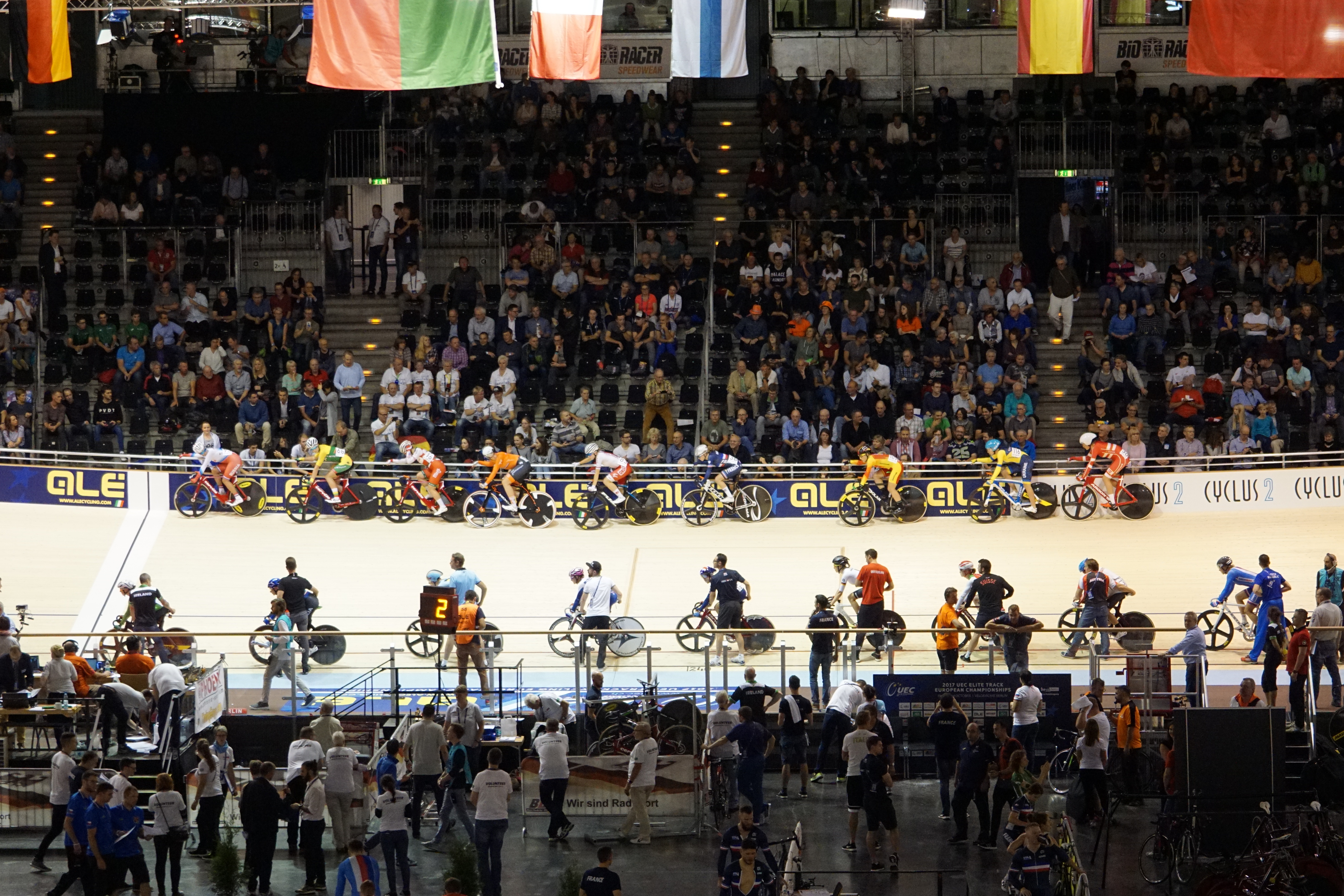
The Women's Elimination race at the 2017 UEC Track Elite European Championships

Elimination races or "snap-dragon" races in bicycle racing are a form of race wherein during the course of the race, certain participants are eliminated through various criteria. The most common types of elimination races are the miss and out and the win and out.

The omnium event has an elimination race. In 2015 at the 2015 UEC European Track Championships, an elimination race was contested for the first time as a full standalone event at an international championship. It has been a separate event at the World Championships since 2021.

== Miss and out ==
The miss and out, or devil take the hindmost, is a race run for individual competitors or, more rarely, for teams of two relaying each other as in the madison. At the end of every lap or every set number of laps the last rider to cross the line is eliminated from the race. When just a handful of riders remain, they sprint for the finish.

Tactically, the real racing in these sorts of races happens at the back of the field. With riders at the front riding steadily and those behind moving up on the elimination laps to find a safe spot, the race favours riders with nerve and track-craft. Crashes are more common than in other races, especially among inexperienced riders.

== Win and out ==
The win and out is similar to the "miss and out", however, rather than the last rider being eliminated the first rider to cross the line is removed from the race. The first rider removed wins first place, the second rider removed wins second place, and so on.
