= Scratch race =

Track cycling race

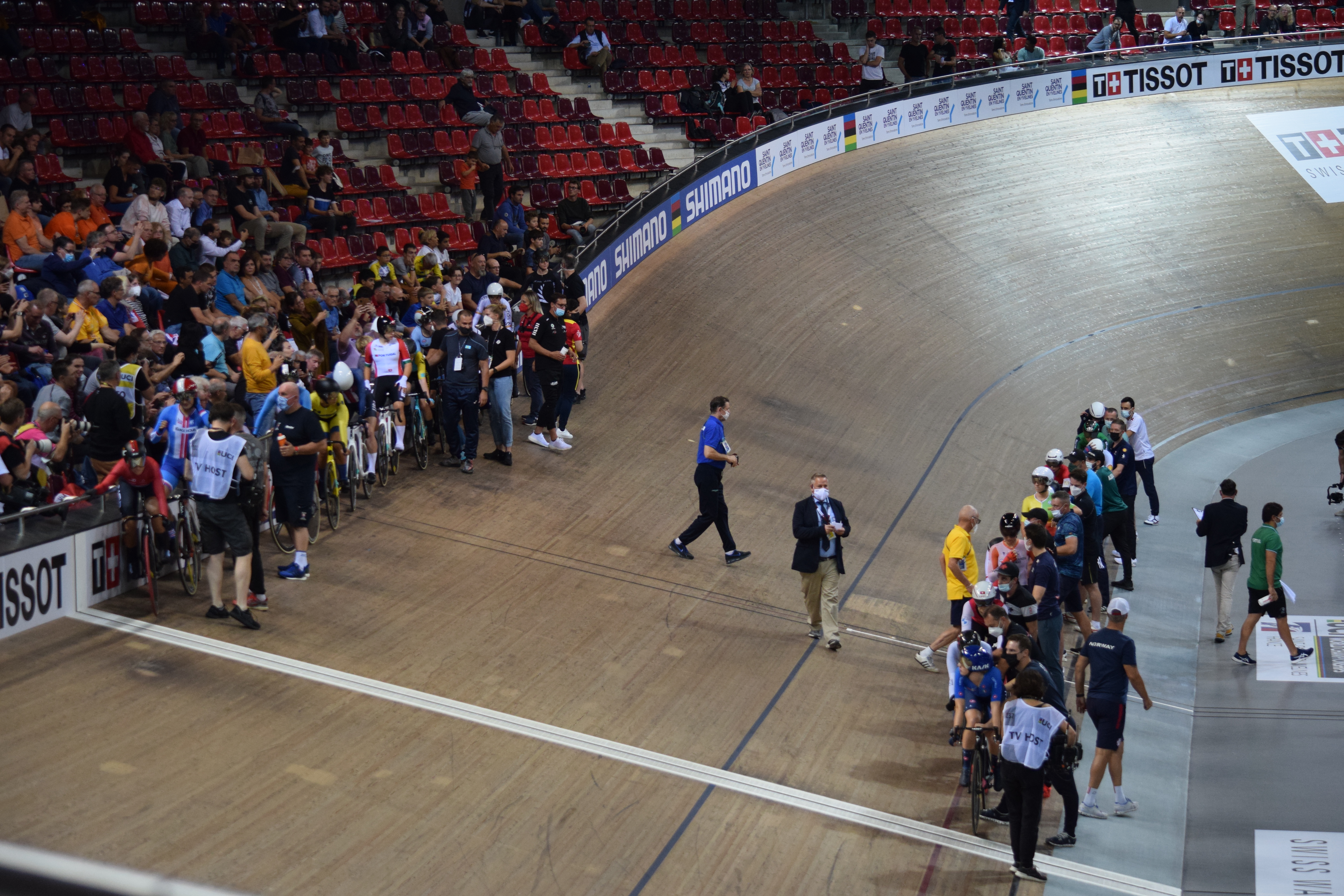

A scratch race is a track cycling race in which all riders start together and the objective is simply to be first over the finish line after a certain number of laps.

UCI regulations specify that a scratch race should be held over 15 km for Elite Men and 10 km for Elite Women. Shorter distances of 10 km for men and 7.5 km for women may be used for qualifying rounds. Racers line up along the inner sprinter's rail and along the outer railing. The riders take a neutralised lap before the starting pistol is fired for the official start. A lapped rider must leave the race once they are overtaken by the peloton. There are no intermediate points or sprints. One tactic is for a rider, or more often a group of riders, to break away and attempt to gain a lap on the rest of the field. The peloton cannot be lapped; but that rider or those riders cannot be beaten by anyone in the peloton.

The format favors endurance sprinters.

== World championships ==
The scratch race has been a UCI World Championship event for men and women since 2002. Franco Marvulli of Switzerland and Alex Rasmussen of Denmark have both won the men's scratch event twice, while Wim Stroetinga of the Netherlands has the most medals with three between 2007 and 2012. In the women's scratch race, Yoanka González of Cuba is the most decorated rider, with five gold or silver medals won between 2004 and 2010.
