= UEC European Track Championships (under-23 & junior) =

Annual international cycling event

The European Champions Jersey

The European Track Cycling Championships (under-23 & junior) are a set of competition events held annually for the various disciplines and distances in track cycling, exclusively for European cyclists under the ages of 23 and 18, and regulated by the European Cycling Union (UEC). They were first held in their current format in 2010, when a competition for elite level cyclists was devised and held for the first time following an overhaul of European track cycling.

Prior to 2010, similar age group championships were held for many years under the title of European Track Championships, a title now used solely for the elite championships. The Under 23 and Junior championships thereafter were run as an annual separate event under their current name.

In line with cycling tradition, winners of an event at the championships are presented with, in addition to the gold medal, a special, identifiable jersey. This UEC European Champion jersey is a blue jersey with gold European stars.

== History ==
=== Age group championships ===
Prior to 2010, championship events were run under the title of UEC European Track Championships, but consisted of events solely for junior and under-23 cyclists. The 2010 UEC European Track Championships event is recognised as the first elite level senior championships. Since 2010, the separate annual European championships for under-23 and junior riders have continued, but is now renamed explicitly as an under-23 and junior grade event. Despite the name change, the events prior to 2010 are considered part of the same lineage as the renamed age-grade event, not the elite championships whose name they share.

European Track Cycling Championships have, however, been held for junior and under-23 athletes in other formats for a long time, though records in earlier editions are incomplete. They provided useful experience for young riders with winners automatically qualifying to compete at the UCI Track Cycling World Championships in which no age limit applied, and the world's best track cyclists competed.

== Events included ==
The junior and u-23 events consist of eleven disciplines for both men and women: time trial, keirin, individual pursuit, team pursuit, points race, scratch race, sprint, team sprint, the madison, the omnium and the 'Devil' or Elimination race. Women's events historically were shorter than men's. Since then, the women's Team Pursuit has been increased in length and number of riders to improve parity, with team sprint following suit some years later.

Championships are open to riders selected by their national cycling governing body. They compete in the colours of their country, but not the national champions jerseys of that country.

== Competitions ==
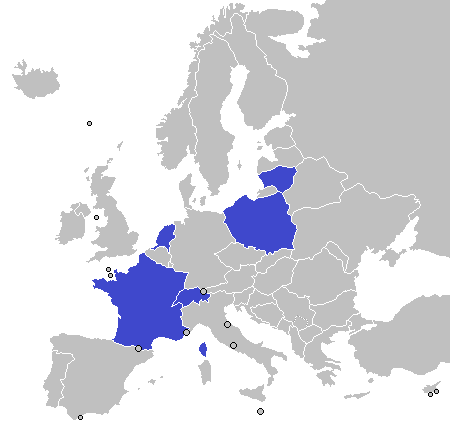
Hosts of European Track Championships

Number	Year	Location	Events
as UEC European Track Championships
1	2001	Brno, Czech Republic (Under 23); Fiorenzuola d'Arda, Italy (Junior)	24
2	2002	Buttgen, Germany	27
3	2003	Moscow, Russia	32
4	2004	Valencia, Spain	32
5	2005	Fiorenzuola d'Arda, Italy	32
6	2006	Athens, Greece	29
7	2007	Cottbus, Germany	30
8	2008	Pruszków, Poland	34
9	2009	Minsk, Belarus	33
as European Track Championships (under-23 & junior)
10	2010	Saint Petersburg, Russia	38
11	2011	Anadia, Portugal	38
12	2012	Anadia, Portugal	38
13	2013	Anadia, Portugal	38
14	2014	Anadia, Portugal	38
15	2015	Athens, Greece	38
16	2016	Montichiari, Italy	38
17	2017	Sangalhos, Portugal	44
18	2018	Aigle, Switzerland	44
19	2019	Ghent, Belgium	44
20	2020	Fiorenzuola d'Arda, Italy	44
21	2021	Apeldoorn, Netherlands	44
22	2022	Anadia, Portugal	44
23	2023	Anadia, Portugal	44
24	2024	Cottbus, Germany	44
25	2025	Anadia, Portugal	44
26	2026	Cottbus, Germany	44

=== All-time medal table (2001-2024) ===
Excludes Men's Open Madison events from 2001-2009 and include Open Omnium events from 2001–2009.

Rank	Nation	Gold	Silver	Bronze	Total
1	Russia	162	135	123	420
2	Italy	134	70	79	283
3	Great Britain	119	106	95	320
4	Germany	112	118	103	333
5	France	90	112	96	298
6	Netherlands	54	61	72	187
7	Poland	41	76	84	201
8	Belgium	41	54	48	143
9	Ukraine	39	25	23	87
10	Czech Republic	31	31	46	108
11	Switzerland	16	22	22	60
12	Denmark	15	13	11	39
13	Spain	12	13	29	54
14	Belarus	8	9	18	35
15	Lithuania	6	15	18	39
16	Portugal	5	17	8	30
17	Ireland	5	10	6	21
18	Greece	4	7	8	19
19	Austria	4	6	4	14
20	Latvia	2	1	2	5
21	Armenia	2	0	0	2
22	Moldova	1	2	1	4
23	Slovenia	1	1	1	3
23	Turkey	1	1	1	3
25	Slovakia	1	1	0	2
26	Norway	0	0	2	2
27	Israel	0	0	1	1
Totals (27 entries)		906	906	901	2,713

== See also ==
- UEC European Track Championships
