= 2025 UCI Road World Championships – Men's junior road race =

Cycling event

Men's junior road race
2025 UCI Road World Championships

Race details
- Dates: 26 September 2025
- Distance: 119.3 km (74.1 mi)
- Winning time: 2:55:19

Medalists
	Gold	(United Kingdom) Harry Hudson (GBR)
	Silver	(France) Johan Blanc (FRA)
	Bronze	(Poland) Jan Jackowiak (POL)

The men's junior road race of the 2025 UCI Road World Championships was a cycling event that took place on 26 September 2025 in Kigali, Rwanda. It was the 50th edition of the championship. The race was won by Harry Hudson, who became the first British winner of the men's junior road race.

The course consisted of eight laps of a 15.1 km (9.4 mi) circuit in Kigali, for a total distance of 119.3 km (74.1 mi) with 2,435 m (7,989 ft) of elevation gain. Of the 141 riders entered, representing 71 nations, 66 finished the race.

== Race summary ==
An early breakaway of four riders formed on the first lap, with the United States' Beckham Drake the last to get caught by the peloton with 36 kilometres (22 mi) to the finish. Great Britain's Harry Hudson attacked, quickly gaining a 40-second lead. A chase group of Benjamín Noval Suárez, Johan Blanc, and Javier Cubillas started to close the gap before Suárez crashed. Hudson had a 10-second lead over Blanc on the final climb, which he was able to maintain and take the win. Behind, Blanc out-sprinted Poland's Jan Jackowiak for silver.

== Final classification ==
Rank	Position in the road race
Time	Time taken to complete the road race
s.t.	Denotes a rider given the same time as the rider above
DNF	Denotes a rider who did not finish

Rank	Rider	Country	Time	Gap
1st place, gold medalist(s)	Harry Hudson	Great Britain	2:55:19	+0
2nd place, silver medalist(s)	Johan Blanc	France	2:55:35	+16
3rd place, bronze medalist(s)	Jan Jackowiak	Poland	s.t.	s.t.
4	Max Hinds	Great Britain	2:55:41	+22
5	Matthew Peace	Great Britain	2:55:43	+24
6	Edouard Claisse	Belgium	s.t.	s.t.
7	Elias Wandel	Sweden	s.t.	s.t.
8	Daan Dijkman	Netherlands	s.t.	s.t.
9	Moritz Mauss	Germany	s.t.	s.t.
10	Benedikt Benz	Germany	s.t.	s.t.
11	Nahom Efriem	Eritrea	s.t.	s.t.
12	Seff van Kerckhove	Belgium	2:55:46	+27
13	Michael Hettegger	Austria	s.t.	s.t.
14	Mats Vanden Eynde	Belgium	2:55:48	+29
15	Javier Cubillas Salvador	Spain	2:55:49	+30
16	Karl Herzog	Germany	2:56:13	+54
17	Jose Said Cisneros Diaz de Leon	Mexico	s.t.	s.t.
18	Roberto Capello	Italy	s.t.	s.t.
19	Jeronimo Calderon Palacio	Colombia	2:56:21	+1:02
20	Soan Ruesche	France	2:56:32	+1:13
21	Tom Stirnimann	Switzerland	2:56:41	+1:22
22	Valentin Hofer	Austria	2:56:47	+1:28
23	Max Goold	Australia	2:56:53	+1:34
24	Sebastian Castro Castro	Costa Rica	2:57:04	+1:45
25	Gijs Schoonvelde	Netherlands	2:57:25	+2:06
26	Ashlin Barry	United States	2:57:28	+2:09
27	Dylan Sage	Great Britain	2:57:35	+2:16
28	Michiel Mouris	Netherlands	2:58:11	+2:52
29	Lucas Stevenson	Australia	2:58:15	+2:56
30	Beckam Drake	United States	2:58:39	+3:20
31	Braden Reitz	United States	s.t.	s.t.
32	Giacomo Rosato	Italy	2:58:46	+3:27
33	Mattia Agostinacchio	Italy	2:59:43	+4:24
34	Ben Morin	Canada	2:59:54	+4:35
35	Josh Johnson	South Africa	3:00:17	+4:58
36	Benjamín Noval Suárez	Spain	3:01:11	+5:52
37	Filip Novák	Czech Republic	3:01:50	+6:31
38	Zeno Levi Winter	Germany	3:03:58	+8:39
39	Mario Sanchez Navia	Bolivia	3:04:16	+8:57
40	Adam Revesz	Hungary	3:05:14	+9:55
41	Gian Muller	Switzerland	s.t.	s.t.
42	Nicholas van der Merwe	Bulgaria	3:05:34	+10:15
43	Matvei Yakovlev	Individual Neutral Athletes	3:05:48	+10:29
44	Roger Suren	Namibia	s.t.	s.t.
45	Jakub Zaňka	Czech Republic	3:05:56	+10:37
46	Jan Mroz	Poland	3:06:20	+11:01
47	Keven Teklemariam	Eritrea	3:06:22	+11:03
48	Vanja Kuntarič Žibert	Slovenia	3:06:25	+11:06
49	Paul Miro	Uganda	3:06:27	+11:08
50	Bartosz Lyzwa	Poland	s.t.	s.t.
51	Marks Jakobsons	Latvia	s.t.	s.t.
52	Enzo Hincapie	United States	s.t.	s.t.
53	Jiři Rejzek	Czech Republic	s.t.	s.t.
54	Alexander Erasmus	South Africa	3:06:39	+11:20
55	Rikeyberth Josue Alvarado Parra	Venezuela	3:06:45	+11:26
56	Kevin Andres Estupinan Vargas	Colombia	3:06:58	+11:39
57	Dimas Felipe Mota	Brazil	s.t.	s.t.
58	Matthew Horter	South Africa	3:07:08	+11:49
59	Seyyed Mohammad Nabi Mirbagheri	Iran	3:07:12	+11:53
60	Yousuf Amiri	United Arab Emirates	3:07:21	+12:02
61	Raditia Etto Wijaya	Indonesia	s.t.	s.t.
62	Thor Michielsen	Belgium	3:07:36	+12:17
63	Enaut Urcaregui Sanz	Spain	s.t.	s.t.
64	Hubert Lamothe	Canada	3:07:53	+12:34
65	Vinsya Aditya Putra Ramadhana	Indonesia	3:07:56	+12:37
66	Ntirenganya Moise	Rwanda	3:09:32	+14:13

Rank	Rider	Country	Time
	Marouane Kharbouchi	Morocco	DNF
	Monty Rigby	Canada	DNF
	Murat Kuitenov	Kazakhstan	DNF
	Fletcher Medway	Australia	DNF
	Theophile Vassal	France	DNF
	Yassine M'Hah	Morocco	DNF
	Loic Schertenleib	Switzerland	DNF
	Daniel Santiago Moreno Garcia	Mexico	DNF
	Heimo Fugger	Austria	DNF
	Omer Ramon	Israel	DNF
	Antoine Bergeron	Canada	DNF
	Bastian Petrič	Slovenia	DNF
	Mario Cordero Santos	Spain	DNF
	Jakub Pastva	Slovakia	DNF
	Tristan Hardy	Mauritius	DNF
	Ksawery Gancarz	Poland	DNF
	Alexander Hewes	Australia	DNF
	Ibai Villate Momene	Spain	DNF
	Juliano Ndrianamanampy	Mauritius	DNF
	Jackson Nkurikiyinka	Rwanda	DNF
	Salah Hamzioui	Algeria	DNF
	Gal Stare	Slovenia	DNF
	Semen Makarov	Individual Neutral Athletes	DNF
	Muhammet Umut Demircan	Turkey	DNF
	Oleh Smolynets	Ukraine	DNF
	Thanapat Sakuntae	Thailand	DNF
	Santiago Aguero	Argentina	DNF
	Tuur Verbeeck	Belgium	DNF
	Justiniano de Araujo	Angola	DNF
	Rastko Nikačević	Serbia	DNF
	Kirill Chzhan	Kazakhstan	DNF
	Hon Man Yip	Hong Kong	DNF
	Saifallah Ali Alsayed	Egypt	DNF
	Or Goldstein	Israel	DNF
	Georgs Tjumins	Latvia	DNF
	Gokturk Yuzerler	Turkey	DNF
	Jose Leonardo Leon Parra	Mexico	DNF
	Med Amine Laouni	Tunisia	DNF
	Ian Kipchirchir	Kenya	DNF
	Keith Enwright Jr.	Belize	DNF
	Kashus Adamski	United States	DNF
	Sergio de Araujo	Angola	DNF
	Henri Rouillard	Mauritius	DNF
	Wan Chun Lee	Hong Kong	DNF
	Exodus Saizonou	Benin	DNF
	Denver Alphonse	Saint Lucia	DNF
	Muhriddin Saparov	Uzbekistan	DNF
	Saif Thani al Ali	United Arab Emirates	DNF
	Joseph Hatali	Tanzania	DNF
	Prateek Ravla	Zimbabwe	DNF
	Saibou Kone	Mali	DNF
	Bakary Bagayogo	Mali	DNF
	Waziri Masoli	Tanzania	DNF
	Leonardo Andres Mendez Benitez	Bolivia	DNF
	Sivuyile Gulwako	Eswatini	DNF
	Osama Asha'Ar	Jordan	DNF
	Koshi Narita	Japan	DNF
	Vilgot Reinhold	Sweden	DNF
	Sorydjan Keita	Guinea	DNF
	Artyom Proskuryakov	Azerbaijan	DNF
	Cylian-Odilon Godonou	Benin	DNF
	Oddi Adel Salim Alsaeh	Libya	DNF
	Ioussuf Soidiki Irhamdine	Comoros	DNF
	Micheal Lobo	Uganda	DNF
	Babacar Atta Fall	Senegal	DNF
	Farrakhan Shaaban Mohammed	Ghana	DNF
	Marco Thiel	Namibia	DNF
	Mohammad Hajeer	Jordan	DNF
	Mahamadi Ouangraoua	Burkina Faso	DNF
	Sofiane Soumana	Niger	DNF
	Mounkalia Yacouba Tinni	Niger	DNF
	Trevor Malvina	Seychelles	DNF
	Semere Fsehaye	Ethiopia	DNF
	Caizer Wilson Ie	Guinea-Bissau	DNF
	Abubaker Abdallah Abu Abd Allah	Libya	DNF
