= 2026 UCI Road World Championships – Men's under-23 road race =

Cycling event

Men's under-23 road race
2026 UCI Road World Championships

Race details
- Dates: 25 September 2026
- Distance: 134 km (83 mi)
- Winning time: 3:49.10

Medalists
	Gold	(United States) Ashlin Barry (USA)
	Silver	(Spain) Héctor Álvarez (ESP)
	Bronze	(Norway) Jesper Stiansen (NOR)

The Men's under-23 road race of the 2026 UCI Road World Championships was a cycling event that took place on 25 September 2026 in Montreal, Canada. It was the 5th edition of the championship, for which Lorenzo Finn of Italy was the defending champion, having won in 2025.

== Final classification ==
Rank	Athlete	Nation	Time
1st place, gold medalist(s)	Ashlin Barry	United States	4h 17' 35"
2nd place, silver medalist(s)	Héctor Álvarez	Spain	+ 53"
3rd place, bronze medalist(s)	Jesper Stiansen	Norway	s.t.
4	Aubin Sparfel	France	s.t.
5	Niels Driesen	Belgium	+ 55"
6	Matteo Scalco	Italy	s.t.
7	Mattia Negrente	Italy	+ 1' 19"
8	Richard Riška	Slovakia	s.t.
9	Erazem Valjavec	Slovenia	s.t.
10	Jack Ward	Australia	s.t.
11	Daan Dijkman	Netherlands	s.t.
12	Marcis Shelton	United States	s.t.
13	Bogdan Zabelinskiy	Cyprus	s.t.
14	Daniel Moreira	Portugal	s.t.
15	Jurgen Zomermaand	Netherlands	s.t.
16	Matisse van Kerckhove	Belgium	s.t.
17	Matteo Vanhuffel	Belgium	s.t.
18	Mateo Ramírez	Ecuador	s.t.
19	Henrique Ribeiro	Brazil	s.t.
20	Melk Zumstein	Switzerland	s.t.
21	Moritz Mauss	Germany	+ 1' 30"
22	Patrick Frydkjaer	Denmark	+ 1' 31"
23	Viktor Soenens	Belgium	+ 1' 33"
24	Elliot Rowe	United Kingdom	+ 2' 29"
25	David Haverdings	Netherlands	s.t.
26	Luke Valenti	Canada	s.t.
27	Kasper Borremans	Finland	s.t.
28	Remi Arsac	France	s.t.
29	Balint Feldhoffer	Hungary	s.t.
30	Cameron Rogers	Australia	s.t.
31	Guus van den Eijnden	Netherlands	s.t.
32	Bert Bolle	Belgium	s.t.
33	Neriah Meunier Sow	Senegal	s.t.
34	Nicolas Halter	Switzerland	s.t.
35	Jose Cisneros	Mexico	s.t.
36	Jan Jackowiak	Poland	s.t.
37	Sven Aleksander Mernik	Slovenia	s.t.
38	Alessandro Cattani	Italy	s.t.
39	Ugo Fabries	France	s.t.
40	Max Bock	Germany	s.t.
41	Rafael Barbas	Portugal	s.t.
42	Paul Fietzke	Germany	+ 2' 48"
43	Juan Diego Quintero	Colombia	+ 3' 44"
44	Daniel Lima	Portugal	+ 3' 45"
45	Kevin Biehl	Denmark	+ 3' 52"
46	Kasper Haugland	Norway	+ 4' 56"
47	Riccardo Lorello	Italy	+ 5' 12"
48	Enea Sambinello	Italy	s.t.
49	Nicolas Ginter	Switzerland	s.t.
50	Mil Morang	Luxembourg	s.t.
51	Timothée Coudière-Cantin	France	s.t.
52	Victor Loulergue	France	s.t.
53	Jasper Schoofs	Belgium	s.t.
54	Kristian Egholm	Denmark	+ 5' 59"
55	Jermaine Zemke	Germany	+ 7' 27"
56	Eñaut Urkaregi	Spain	+ 8' 33"
57	Jacob Bush	Great Britain	s.t.
58	Alberto Monti	Czech Republic	s.t.
59	Mattie Dodd	Great Britain	s.t.
60	Adam Rafferty	Ireland	s.t.
61	Wil Holmes	Australia	s.t.
62	Mads Landbo	Denmark	s.t.
63	Patryk Goszczurny	Canada	s.t.
64	Halvor Dolven	Norway	s.t.
65	Louis Leidert	Germany	s.t.
66	William Heffernan	Australia	s.t.
67	William Smith	Great Britain	s.t.
68	Anatol Friedl	Austria	s.t.
69	Tomaš Pridal	Czech Republic	+ 9' 20"
70	Gavin Sherry	United States	+ 9' 57"
71	Adam Smith	Canada	+ 10' 24"
72	Emil Nielsen	Denmark	+ 10' 44"
73	Dawid Lewandowski	Poland	s.t.
74	Kevin Messel	Norway	s.t.
75	Cesar Cisneros	Mexico	+ 10' 48"
76	Jonas Walton	Canada	s.t.
77	Ciro Pérez	Uruguay	s.t.
78	Sebastian Castro	Costa Rica	s.t.
79	Vladislav Bashlykov	Kazakhstan	+ 11' 54"
80	Diego Casagrandre	Switzerland	s.t.
81	Michael Zarate	Mexico	s.t.
82	Samuel Novak	Slovakia	+ 12' 41"
83	Václav Ježek	Czech Republic	s.t.
84	Liam O'Brien	Ireland	+ 13' 30"
85	Ben Wiggins	Great Britain	+ 14' 18"
86	Jan Huber	Switzerland	s.t.
87	Noah Andersen	Denmark	s.t.
88	Jerome Gauthier	Canada	+ 15' 30"
89	Oliver Matik	Estonia	+ 16' 00"
90	David Gaffney	Ireland	s.t.
91	Miguel Ángel Marín	Colombia	s.t.
92	Robert Andrés Plazas	Colombia	s.t.
93	Jaka Marolt	Slovenia	+ 17' 10"
94	Adrià Regada	Andorra	+ 17' 11"
95	Anže Ravbar	Slovenia	+ 17' 35"
96	Mattia Proietti Gagliardoni	Italy	+ 20' 15"

Rank	Athlete	Nation	Time
	Flavio Astolfi	Luxembourg	DNF
	Mario Sánchez	Bolivia	DNF
	Filip Surdyk	Poland	DNF
	Francisco Fernández	Spain	DNF
	Jonas Kind Høydahl	Norway	DNF
	Jaider Muñoz	Colombia	DNF
	Gabriel Baptista	Portugal	DNF
	Pierre Henry Basset	France	DNF
	Thomas Waites	Australia	DNF
	Yevhen Testsov	Ukraine	DNF
	Nicholas van der Merwe	Bulgaria	DNF
	William Colorado	Colombia	DNF
	Lachlan McNabb	New Zealand	DNF
	José Antonio Prieto	Mexico	DNF
	Teodor de Luca	Sweden	DNF
	José Juan Prieto	Mexico	DNF
	Nahom Efriem	Eritrea	DNF
	Ferhat Emisci	Turkey	DNF
	Chen Yusheng	China	DNF
	Alejandro Granados	Costa Rica	DNF
	Daniel Cepa	Spain	DNF
	Markel Aranaz	Spain	DNF
	Davio Jonsson	Iceland	DNF
	Melvin Torres	Guatemala	DNF
	Jadian Neaves	Trinidad and Tobago	DNF
	Valentin Hofer	Austria	DNF
	Taito Shindo	Japan	DNF
	Kade Kreikemeier	United States	DNF
	Manuel Sanroma	Spain	DNF
	Blaine Kieck	South Africa	DNF
	Seth Dunwoody	Ireland	DNF
	Rastko Nikacevic	Serbia	DNF
	Isshin Yamasato	Japan	DNF
	Romet Pajur	Estonia	DNF
	Mohamed Amine Hamzaoui	Algeria	DNF
	Judah Thompson	Thailand	DNF
	Michiel Mouris	Netherlands	DNF
	Frank Aron Ragilo	Estonia	DNF
	Nathan Cusack	United States	DNF
	Joshua Dike	South Africa	DNF
	Liu Zhicheng	China	DNF
	Amaniel Desta	Ethiopia	DNF
	Ruben Rodrigues	Portugal	DNF
	Rizky Ridho Riyadiyanto	Indonesia	DNF
	Pablo Escajadillo	Peru	DNF
	Cheung Shi Ho	Hong Kong	DNF
	Kevin Nshutiraguma	Rwanda	DNF
	Alexander Erasmus	South Africa	DNF
	Jaylen Briceno	Belize	DNF
	Jeremy Raboude	Mauritius	DNF
	Zhang Rongqi	China	DNF
	Samuel Quevauvilliers	Mauritius	DNF
	Wilson Sanon	Haiti	DNF
	Ramiro Videla	Argentina	DNF
	Temuulen Khadbaatar	Mongolia	DNF
	Danylo Kozoriz	Ukraine	DNF
	Mohammed Alaleeli	United Arab Emirates	DNF
	Mohamed Aziz Dellai	Tunisia	DNF
	Marouane Kharbouchi	Morocco	DNF
	Deska Raya Adya	Indonesia	DNF
	Aditya Suryadi Putra	Indonesia	DNF
	Mousa Al Naghaf	Saudi Arabia	DNF
	Hareb Almarzooqi	United Arab Emirates	DNF
	Daniel Orellana	El Salvador	DNF
	Goran Gabourel	Belize	DNF
	Khalil Francis	Jamaica	DNF
	Anthony Coque	Ecuador	DNF
	John Muchiri	Kenya	DNF
	Kaden Sutherland	Belize	DNF
	Prateek Ravla	Zimbabwe	DNF
	Denver Alphonse	Saint Lucia	DNF
	Mustafa Tarakci	Turkey	DNF
	Arda Tekirdag	Turkey	DNF
	Tekle Alemayo	Ethiopia	DNF
	Aron Tekle	Ethiopia	DNF
	Oliver Sims	Australia	DNF
	Milkiyas Maekele	Eritrea	DNF
	Jexon Ledezma	Costa Rica	DNF
	Bernardo Cambareri	Argentina	DNF
	Mateo Kalejman	Argentina	DNF
