= 2026 UCI Road World Championships – Men's under-23 time trial =

Cycling event

Men's under-23 time trial
2026 UCI Road World Championships

Race details
- Dates: 21 September 2026
- Distance: 31.3 km (19.4 mi)
- Winning time: 37:26.16

Medalists
	Gold	(Netherlands) Ryan Gal (NED)
	Silver	(Italy) Nicolas Milesi (ITA)
	Bronze	(Spain) Héctor Álvarez (ESP)

The Men's under-23 time trial of the 2026 UCI Road World Championships was a cycling event that took place on 21 September 2026 in Montreal, Canada. It was the 30th edition of the championship, for which Jakob Söderqvist of Sweden was the defending champion, having won in 2026.

== Final classification ==
Rank	Athlete	Nation	Time	Time Gap
1st place, gold medalist(s)	Ryan Gal	Netherlands	37:26.16	–
2nd place, silver medalist(s)	Nicolas Milesi	Italy	37:33.17	+ 7.01
3rd place, bronze medalist(s)	Héctor Álvarez	Spain	37:38.04	+ 11.88
4	Ashlin Barry	United States	37:59.94	+ 33.78
5	Mads Landbo	Denmark	38:01.89	+ 35.73
6	Kristian Egholm	Denmark	38:06.55	+ 40.39
7	Kasper Haugland	Norway	38:12.74	+ 46.58
8	Bogdan Zabelinskiy	Cyprus	38:18.14	+ 51.98
9	Michiel Mouris	Netherlands	38:22.36	+ 56.20
10	Adam Rafferty	Ireland	38:23.05	+ 56.89
11	Ben Wiggins	Great Britain	38:33.53	+ 1:07.37
12	Matisse van Kerckhove	Belgium	38:49.51	+ 1:23.35
13	Bruno Kessler	Germany	38:51.66	+ 1:25.50
14	Arthur Blaise	France	38:51.94	+ 1:25.78
15	Louis Leidert	Germany	38:56.37	+ 1:30.21
16	Jonas Walton	Canada	39:01.98	+ 1:35.82
17	Jasper Schoofs	Belgium	39:05.18	+ 1:39.02
18	Jonas Kind Høydahl	Norway	39:15.56	+ 1:49.40
19	Eñaut Urcaregui	Spain	39:21.10	+ 1:54.94
20	Wil Holmes	Australia	39:23.48	+ 1:57.32
21	Alessandro Cattani	Italy	39:25.72	+ 1:59.96
22	Carson Mattern	Canada	39:25.73	+ 1:59.57
23	Sebastián Ruiz	Mexico	39:28.10	+ 2:01.94
24	Romet Pajur	Estonia	39:28.74	+ 2:02.58
25	Nicholas Van der Merwe	Bulgaria	39:30.28	+ 2:04.12
26	Mateo Kalejman	Argentina	39:35.36	+ 2:09.20
27	Kade Kreikemeier	United States	39:44.05	+ 2:17.89
28	Frank Aron Ragilo	Estonia	39:51.61	+ 2:45.45
29	Robert Andrés Plazas	Colombia	39:58.93	+ 2:32.77
30	Patryk Goszczurny	Poland	40:01.33	+ 2:35.17
31	Juan Diego Quintero	Colombia	40:03.04	+ 2:36.88
32	Davio Jonsson	Iceland	40:11.67	+ 2:45.51
33	Alberto Monti	Czech Republic	40:14.90	+ 2:48.74
34	Thomas Waites	Australia	40:15.47	+ 2:49.31
35	Jaka Marolt	Slovenia	40:21.91	+ 2:55.75
36	Mikhail Podluzhnyy	Kazakhstan	40:26.11	+ 2:59.95
37	Jan Jackowiak	Poland	40:35.1	+ 3:08.96
38	Vladislav Bashlykov	Kazakhstan	40:38.80	+ 3:12.64
39	Cameron Rogers	Australia	40:50.39	+ 3:24.23
40	Jan Huber	Switzerland	40:52.52	+ 3:26.36
41	Danylo Kozoriz	Ukraine	40:52.73	+ 3:26.57
42	Taito Shindo	Japan	41:03.64	+ 3:37.48
43	Joshua Dike	South Africa	41:15.41	+ 3:49.25
44	Mansur Beisembay	Kazakhstan	41:16.22	+ 3:50.06
45	Zhano Chenli	China	41:24.39	+ 3:58.23
46	Mario Sánchez	Bolivia	41:26.97	+ 4:00.81
47	Ferhat Emisci	Turkey	41:30.43	+ 4:04.27
48	Jadian Neaves	Trinidad and Tobago	41:42.01	+ 4:15.85
49	Chen Yusheng	China	41:44.37	+ 4:18.21
50	Rastko Nikacevic	Serbia	41:48.86	+ 4:22.70
51	Mohamed Aziz Dellai	Tunisia	42:17.23	+ 4:51.07
52	Isshin Yamasato	Japan	42:23.10	+ 4:56.94
53	Kevin Nshutiraguma	Rwanda	42:41.90	+ 5:15.74
54	Hareb Almarzooqi	United Arab Emirates	42:47.05	+ 5:20.89
55	Alexander Erasmus	South Africa	42:47.37	+ 5:21.21
56	Seth Dunwoody	Ireland	43:20.08	+ 5:53.92
57	Jeremy Raboude	Mauritius	43:24.64	+ 5:58.48
58	Samuel Quevauvilliers	Mauritius	43:36.53	+ 6:10.37
59	Rizky Ridho Riyadiyanto	Indonesia	43:45.23	+ 6:19.07
60	Jaylen Briceno	Belize	43:53.91	+ 6:27.75
61	Pablo Escajadillo	Peru	43:58.57	+ 6:32.41
62	Temuulen Khadbaatar	Mongolia	44:07.88	+ 6:41.72
63	Deska Raya Adya	Indonesia	44:37.71	+ 7:11.55
64	Arda Tekirdag	Turkey	44:56.88	+ 7:30.72
65	Prateek Ravla	Zimbabwe	47:41.39	+ 10:15.23
66	Denver Alphonse	Saint Lucia	49:32.94	+ 12:06.78
67	John Muchiri	Kenya	50:50.34	+ 13:24.18
	Reef Roberts	New Zealand	Did not start	
	Amaniel Desta	Ethiopia	Did not start	
	Goran Gabourel	Belize	Did not start	
	Khotsofalang Rakaota	Lesotho	Did not start	
	Tekle Alemayo	Ethiopia	Did not start	
