= Hess Cycling Team =

International women's cycling team

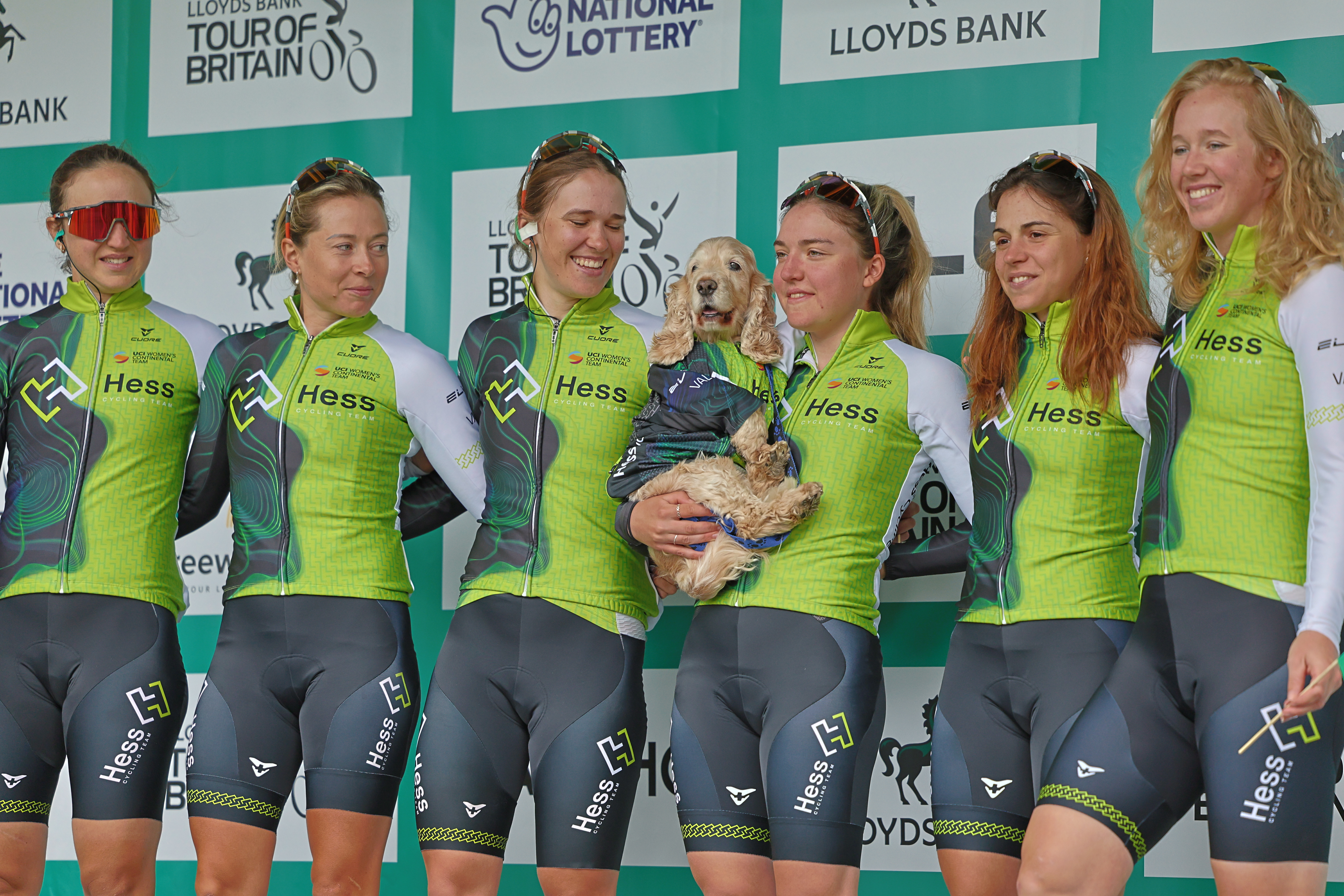
- At the Tour of Britain in 2025

Team information
- Registered: Luxembourg (2023); Great Britain (2024–)
- Founded: 2023; 3 years ago
- Discipline: Road Cycling
- Status: UCI Women's Continental Team (2023–2024); Club Team (2025–)

Key personnel
- General manager: Pirmin Lang
- Team managers: Pirmin Lang; Norbert Stocker

Team name history
- 2023–: Hess Cycling Team

Hess Cycling Team was a professional women's cycling team that competed at the UCI Women's Continental level. The team was active from 2023 to 2025 and was owned by Swiss businessman Rolf Hess. Originally licensed in Luxembourg, the team later moved to a British license.

== History ==
Hess Cycling Team was established in 2023 as a professional women's road cycling team. In 2025 the team secured a three-year sponsorship agreement with OFX. Initially, the team raced under a Luxembourg license before transitioning to a British racing license in 2024. Owned by Rolf Hess, under Hess Sports Group, the team aspires to become the first British Women's WorldTour team. The organisation is focused on expanding its presence in both domestic and international races, aiming to build on its initial successes and attract additional talent.

On January 30, 2025 the cycling press in the UK reported that the team’s owner, Swiss businessman Rolf Hess, was under investigation for fraud in Spain. It then quickly came to light that the team did not, in fact, have the requisite UCI licence to race in 2025. It was further reported that the reason the UCI was withholding the team’s licence was because Hess had not paid riders, staff and creditors for the 2024 season.

On March 14, 2025, the UK cycling press again reported that the team were still without a licence, that current staff and riders had not been paid at the start of the 2025 season and that the team had withdrawn from their first block of races.

Hess Cycling Team, having been adamant in statements to journalists in articles printed on March 14, 2025 that the team would have the required UCI licence by no later than March 17 and would commence its 2025 race program at the Midwest Cycling Classic in Belgium on 23 March, subsequently withdrew from the event further fuelling concerns of pending collapse. As of 19 March 2025, Hess Cycling Team were still without a UCI licence.

In early April 2025 it emerged that 5 riders; Laura Lizette Sander, Esther Wong, Natalie Quinn, Kate Richardson and Elisabeth Ebras had terminated their contracts with Hess Cycling during March, due to contractual breaches by the team. These included continual late payment of rider salaries and the fact that the team was not registered with the UCI. On 21 March 2025, amid ongoing controversy, Hess Cycling Team announced that it had been granted a UCI licence, over 3 months after the official deadline for registration.

== Roster ==
Rider	Date of birth
Danique Braam (NED)	9 September 1995 (age 31)
Elisabeth Ebras (EST)	22 July 2004 (age 22)
Betty Hasse (USA)	26 September 2002 (age 24)
Grace Lister (GBR)	27 May 2004 (age 22)
Alice McWilliam (GBR)	23 July 1995 (age 31)
Maeve Plouffe (AUS)	8 July 1999 (age 27)
Natalie Quinn (USA)	23 December 2001 (age 24)

Rider	Date of birth
Holly Ramsey (GBR)	4 December 2005 (age 20)
Kate Richardson (GBR)	12 September 2002 (age 24)
Laura Lizette Sander (EST)	15 May 2004 (age 22)
Laura Süßemilch (GER)	23 February 1997 (age 29)
Liv Wenzel (LUX)	8 January 2004 (age 22)
Esther Wong (IRL)	18 February 2006 (age 20)
Elena Wu-Yan (USA)	7 October 1996 (age 30)

== Major wins ==
2023
Israel National Time Trial Championships, Rotem Gafinovitz
2024
Israel National Time Trial Championships, Rotem Gafinovitz
Israel National Road Race Championships, Rotem Gafinovitz
Luxembourg National Under23 Road Race Championships, Liv Wenzel

== Partnerships ==
2025

In October 2024, Hess Cycling Team announced a three-year sponsorship agreement with OFX, starting in 2025. Under this agreement, it was confirmed that OFX will become the main sponsor of Hess Cycling Team.
