= Frederik Wandahl =

Danish racing cyclist

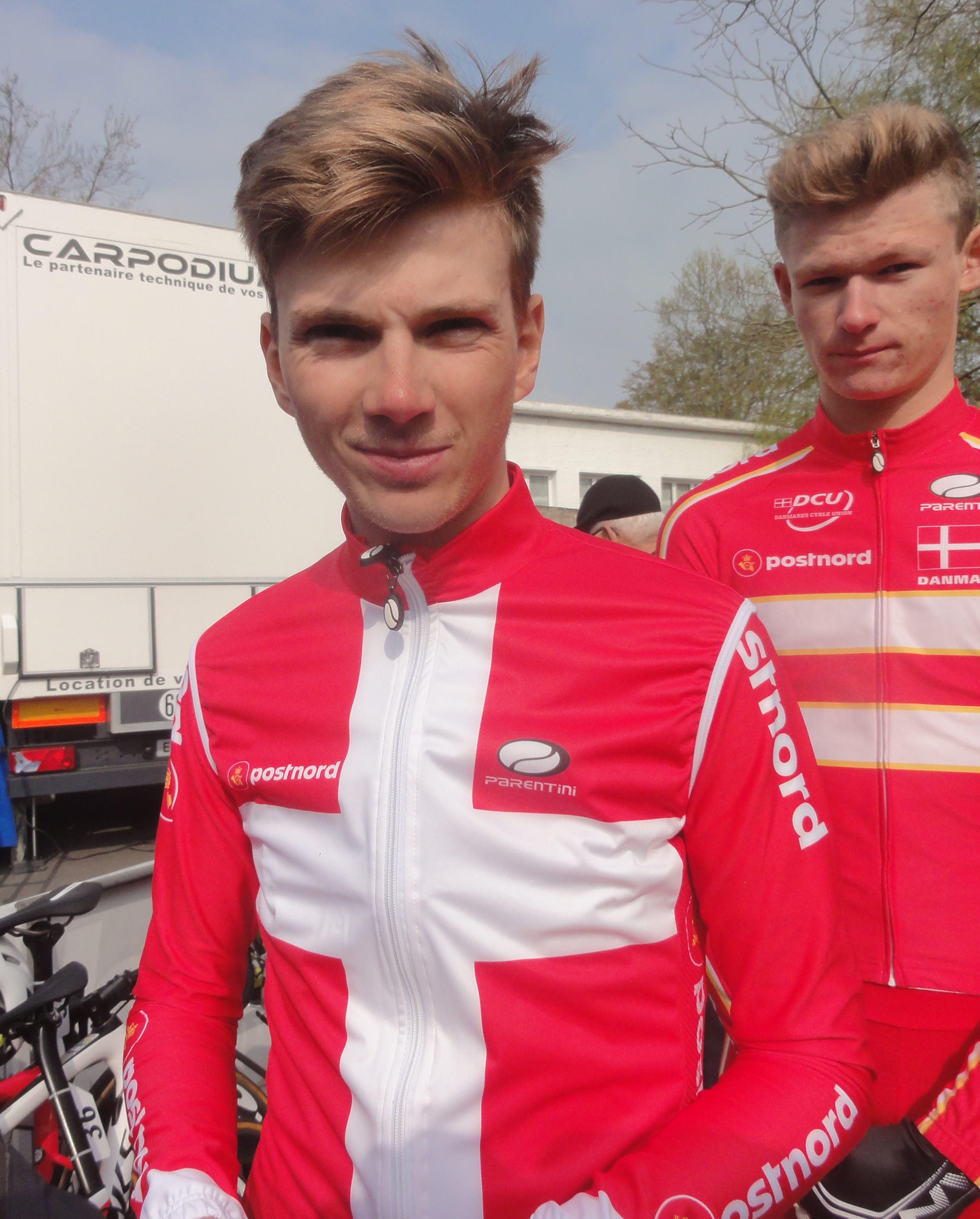
- Wandahl in 2019

Personal information
- Born: 9 May 2001 (age 25) Höllviken, Sweden

Cycling career
- Sport: Cycling
- Current team: Red Bull–Bora–Hansgrohe
- Discipline: Road
- Role: Rider

Professional teams
- 2020: Team ColoQuick
- 2021–: Bora–Hansgrohe

Frederik Michal Anker Wandahl (born 9 May 2001) is a Danish cyclist, who currently rides for UCI WorldTeam Red Bull–Bora–Hansgrohe.

== Major results ==
2018
1st Road race, National Junior Road Championships
2nd Johan Museeuw Classic
4th Overall Saarland Trofeo

1st Young rider classification
1st Stage 1

5th Road race, UCI Junior Road World Championships
5th Trofeo Emilio Paganessi
2019
2nd Road race, National Junior Road Championships
2nd Trofeo Emilio Paganessi
6th Trofeo Comune di Vertova
8th Road race, UCI Junior Road World Championships
2021
2nd Road race, National Road Championships
2022
8th Overall Tour de Wallonie
10th Gran Piemonte
2023
1st Mountains classification, Tour of Guangxi
8th Bretagne Classic
2024
3rd Road race, National Road Championships
5th Overall Tour de Wallonie

1st Young rider classification

9th Overall CRO Race
10th Milano–Torino
2025
4th Trofeo Calvià
5th Eschborn–Frankfurt
