= Harry Hudson (cyclist) =

British cyclist (born 2007)

Personal information
- Born: 29 August 2007 (age 19)

Cycling career
- Sport: Cycling
- Discipline: Road
- Role: Rider

Amateur teams
- 2024–2025: Harrogate Nova Race Team
- 2025: Fensham Howes-MAS Design-CAMS

Professional team
- 2026: Lidl–Trek Future Racing
Medal record
Representing United Kingdom
Men's road bicycle racing
World Championships
Gold medal – first place	2025 Kigali	Junior road race

Harry Hudson (born 29 August 2007) is a British junior road cyclist. At the 2025 UCI Road World Championships in Kigali, Hudson became the first male British rider to win the junior road race. He is scheduled to join Lidl-Trek Future Racing for the 2026 season.

Hudson is a 3-time British Hill Climb Champion in the junior category. In 2024, at 17 years old, Hudson's winning time would have placed third in the elite category.

In 2025, Hudson won the junior edition of Liège-Bastogne-Liège in a controversial finish. On the final climb of Côte de La Redoute, Hudson and Belgian Leander De Gendt were sprinting to the finish line before a police motorbike moved in front of De Gendt, causing him to change his line and lose the sprint. De Gendt's team contested the result, with the jury determining that the Belgian's sprint was disrupted, but the outcome would not change as Hudson was not at fault.

== Major results ==
2023
1st National Junior Hill Climb Championships
2024
1st National Junior Hill Climb Championships
2025
1st Road race, UCI Road World Junior Championships
1st Liège–Bastogne–Liège Juniors
1st Junior CiCLE Classic
1st Classic Région Sud U19
1st Stage 1 Vuelta a Cantabria
2026
10th À travers les Hautes Fagnes
