= 2026 European Road Championships =

32nd European Road Cycling Championships

- Location within Slovenia
- Venue: Ljubljana, Slovenia
- Date: 2–7 October 2026
- Coordinates: 46°3′17″N 14°30′20″E
- Events: 14

The 2026 European Road Championships (officially the 2026 UEC Road European Championships) was the 32nd edition of the European Road Cycling Championships, the annual continental championships for road bicycle racing organized by the European Cycling Union (UEC). It was held from 2 to 7 October 2026 in Ljubljana, Slovenia.

It was the first time that Slovenia hosts a major international road cycling championship. The agreement to organize the event was signed on 17 November 2025 in Ljubljana by the Slovenian Minister of Economy, Tourism and Sport, Matjaž Han, UEC President Enrico Della Casa, and the President of the Slovenian Cycling Federation, Pavel Marđonović.

== Background ==
Slovenia has become a prominent cycling nation in recent years, with riders such as Tadej Pogačar, Primož Roglič, and Matej Mohorič achieving success at the highest level of the sport. At the 2025 edition in Drôme-Ardèche, France, Pogačar won Slovenia's first elite men's road race gold at the European Championships with a 75 km solo attack, finishing ahead of Remco Evenepoel and Paul Seixas. Demi Vollering of the Netherlands won the elite women's road race with a 37 km solo ride, while Evenepoel claimed the men's elite time trial by 43 seconds, adding the European title to his existing world and Olympic time trial crowns.

The 2026 edition featured a new schedule format, with the road races taking place before the time trials. The event took place one week after the 2026 UCI Road World Championships in Montréal, Canada, requiring riders competing in both events to manage transatlantic travel and potential jet lag.

== Race schedule ==
All times are in CEST (UTC+2).

Date	Timings	Event	Distance
Road race events
2 October	9:00	Under-23 Women	88.4 km (54.9 mi)
2 October	13:30	Under-23 Men	141.8 km (88.1 mi)
3 October	9:00	Junior Men	110.5 km (68.7 mi)
3 October	13:30	Elite Women	129.9 km (80.7 mi)
4 October	9:00	Junior Women	66.3 km (41.2 mi)
4 October	12:30	Elite Men	196.2 km (121.9 mi)
Time trial events
6 October	11:00	Mixed team relay junior	44 km (27 mi)
6 October	15:30	Mixed team relay elite	44 km (27 mi)
7 October	9:15	Junior Women	22 km (14 mi)
7 October	10:10	Junior Men	22 km (14 mi)
7 October	11:30	Under-23 Women	22 km (14 mi)
7 October	12:20	Under-23 Men	22 km (14 mi)
7 October	14:30	Elite Women	22 km (14 mi)
7 October	16:15	Elite Men	22 km (14 mi)

== Medal summary ==
=== Elite ===
Event	Gold		Silver		Bronze	
Men's Elite Events
Road race	Remco Evenepoel; Belgium	4h 16'37"	Giulio Ciccone; Italy	s.t.	Christian Scaroni; Italy	+59"
Time trial	Primož Roglič; Slovenia	28:16.61	Bruno Armirail; France	+ 6.58"	Maxime Decomble; France	+ 28.42"
Women's Elite Events
Road race	Demi Vollering; Netherlands	3h 10' 33"	Puck Pieterse; Netherlands	+5"	Marlen Reusser; Switzerland	s.t.
Time trial	Marlen Reusser; Switzerland	31:30.84	Demi Vollering; Netherlands	+ 23.33"	Juliette Berthet; France	+ 1:10.13"

=== Under-23 ===
Event	Gold		Silver		Bronze	
Men's Under-23 Events
Road race	Héctor Álvarez; Spain	3h 02' 22"	Jan Jackowiak; Poland	+20"	Niels Driesen; Belgium	+32"
Time trial	Héctor Álvarez; Spain	28:44.70	Matisse Van Kerckhove; Belgium	+ 3.07"	Kasper Haugland; Norway	+ 19.10"
Women's Under-23 Events
Road race	Mara Winter; Switzerland	2h 26' 48"	Nienke Vinke; Netherlands	s.t.	Viktória Chladoňová; Slovakia	s.t.
Time trial	Nienke Vinke; Netherlands	32:36.93	Megan Arens; Netherlands	+ 36.78"	Viktória Chladoňová; Slovakia	+ 41.11"

=== Junior ===
Event	Gold		Silver		Bronze	
Men's Junior Events
Road race	Elias Dybing; Norway	2h 42' 40"	Aitor Martínez Groset; Spain	+ 10"	Jop van den Biggelaar; Netherlands	s.t.
Time trial	Benjamín Noval; Spain	29:46.98	Malthe Risbjerg; Denmark	+ 0.03"	Vic De Smet; Belgium	+ 7.66"
Women's Junior Events
Road race	Azzurra Ballan; Italy	1h 52' 38"	Morgane Lestrade; France	s.t.	Klara Dworatzek; Germany	s.t.
Time trial	Alejandra Neira; Spain	35:45.65	Laura Five; Belgium	+ 3.18"	Augustė Mikutytė; Lithuania	+ 10.49"

=== Mixed relay ===
Event	Gold		Silver		Bronze	
Elite team time trial	France; Bruno Armirail; Rémi Cavagna; Thibault Guernalec; Juliette Berthet; Cédrine Kerbaol; Maëva Squiban	1h 00' 19.05"	Italy; Mattia Cattaneo; Marco Frigo; Matteo Sobrero; Elisa Longo Borghini; Monica Trinca Colonel; Alessia Vigilia	+ 1:12.36"	Luxembourg; Alex Kirsch; Mathieu Kockelmann; Mats Wenzel; Nina Berton; Marie Schreiber; Liv Wenzel	+ 3:34.52"
Junior team time trial	Italy; Enrico Andrea Balliana; Brandon Fedrizzi; Patrik Pezzo Rosola; Azzurra Ballan; Elisa Bianchi; Matilde Rossignoli	1h 07' 22.19"	Poland; Mateusz Błaszak; Mikołaj Legieć; Igor Mitoraj; Agata Sekta; Amelia Szymańska; Kinga Słomka	+ 23.01"	Switzerland; Laurin Lingenhag; Gian Müller; Antoine Salamin; Joline Hunziker; Elia Marthe; Valentine Rousseaux	+30.08"

== Medal table ==
* Host nation (Slovenia)

Rank	Nation	Gold	Silver	Bronze	Total
1	Spain	4	1	0	5
2	Netherlands	2	4	1	7
3	Italy	2	2	1	5
4	Switzerland	2	0	2	4
5	Belgium	1	2	2	5
5	France	1	2	2	5
7	Norway	1	0	1	2
8	Slovenia*	1	0	0	1
9	Poland	0	2	0	2
10	Denmark	0	1	0	1
11	Slovakia	0	0	2	2
12	Germany	0	0	1	1
12	Lithuania	0	0	1	1
12	Luxembourg	0	0	1	1
Totals (14 entries)		14	14	14	42
