= Ashlin Barry =

American cyclist (born 2007)

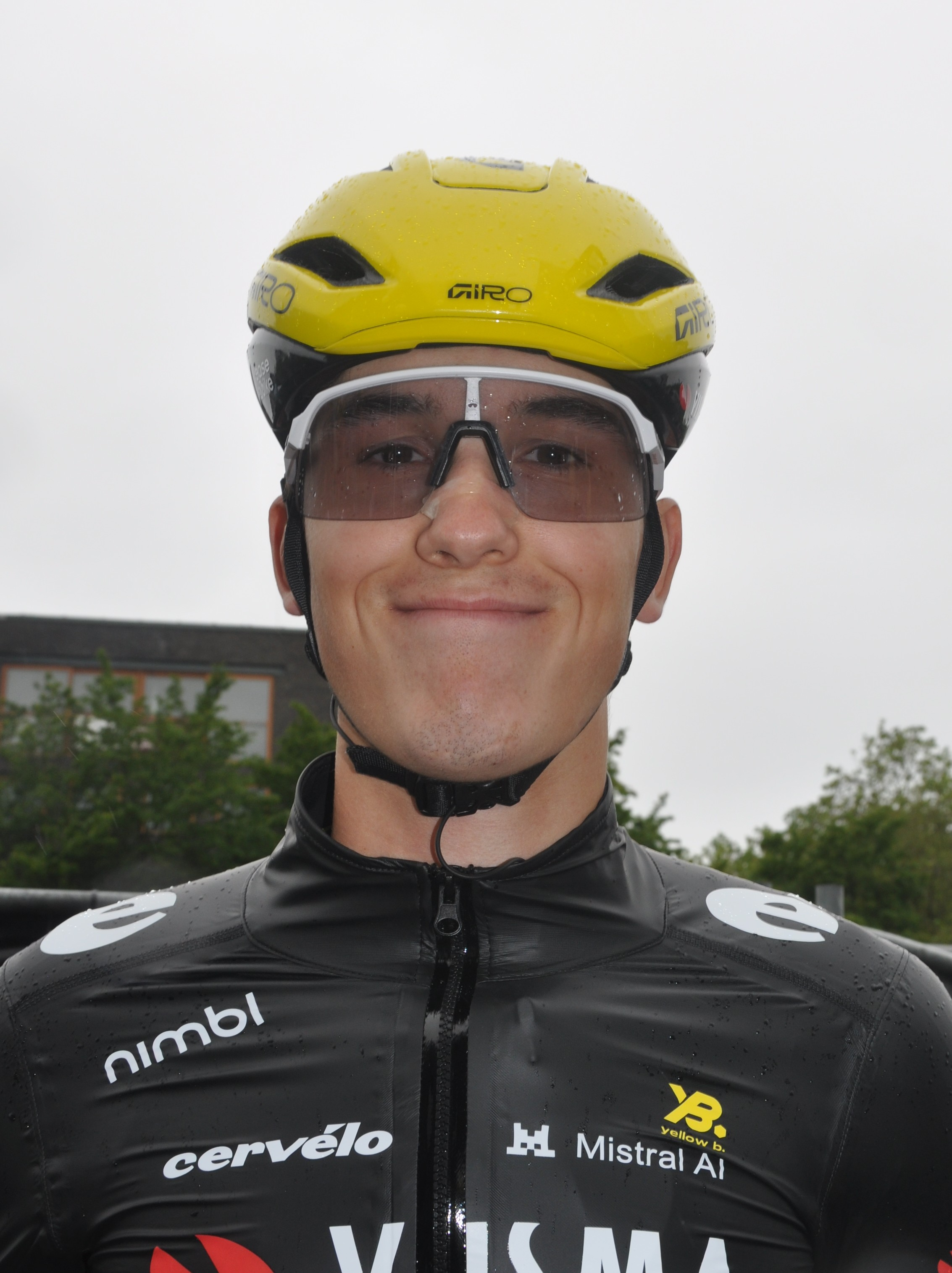
- Barry at the 2026 Rund um Köln

Personal information
- Born: 25 September 2007 (age 19) Girona, Spain
- Height: 1.92 m (6 ft 4 in)
- Weight: 77 kg (170 lb)

Cycling career
- Sport: Cycling
- Current team: Visma–Lease a Bike Development
- Disciplines: Road; Track; Gravel
- Role: Rider

Amateur teams
- 2024: EF Education–ONTO Development Team
- 2025: JEGG–SKIL–DJR

Professional team
- 2026–: Visma–Lease a Bike Development
Medal record
Representing United States
Men's track cycling
Junior World Championships
Silver medal – second place	2024 Luoyang	Omnium
Men's road cycling
World Championships
Gold medal – first place	2026 Montreal	Under-23 road race
Silver medal – second place	2025 Kigali	Junior time trial

Ashlin Barry (born 25 September 2007) is a Canadian-American professional racing cyclist, who rides for UCI Continental team Visma–Lease a Bike Development. He is the 2026 UCI Under-23 Road Race World Champion.

== Early life ==
He was born in Girona, Spain, and shared his time between Girona and Boulder, Colorado when he was young. In 2013, his family moved to Toronto, Canada. He attended Upper Canada College in Toronto. He trained in track cycling at the Mattamy National Cycling Centre and despite being an under-17 rider received had special permission in 2023 to race with the under-19 category at the Canadian track nationals where he won gold in the elimination race, the madison, the team pursuit, as well as winning a silver medal in the individual pursuit, keirin, and points race. That year, he raced the Next Generation Track Meet in Apeldoorn, The Netherlands, where he was second in the individual pursuit and points race, and first in the scratch race, tempo race and elimination race.

== Career ==
From 2024, he began racing with the U.S. National Cycling Team. He won a silver medal in the Omnium at the 2024 UCI Junior Track Cycling World Championships. He also became Junior U.S. road race, time trial, and Madison national champion, as well as Elite Madison National Champion (with partner Enzo Edmonds) and won a round of the UCI Gravel World Series. In 2024, he rode for EF Education-ONTO development team and raced for Team USA Juniors and won the general classification at the Tour du Bocage. He had a top-ten finish at Paris-Roubaix Juniors in 2024. He finished 2nd in the general classification at the Saarland Trofeo Nations Cup in 2024. He was fifth in the junior men’s road race at the 2024 World Championships.

In December 2024, he signed for Visma-Lease a Bike to ride for their development team JEGG-SKIL-DJR Academy before transitioning to join UCI WorldTeam Visma–Lease a Bike for the 2026 season.

In March 2025 at the UCI Nations Cup, Barry, alongside Graeme Frislie, Anders Johnson and David Domonoske, set the American record in the team pursuit in a time of 3:47.503, beating the previous record by five seconds. The team finished second in the process. Barry also won a silver medal in the omnium. After racing in Turkey, he traveled to Northern Europe to race on the road with the Junior National Road team and won the general classification and two stages of the UCI Cottbus International Junior Race and finished second in the junior editions of Paris–Roubaix and the E3 Saxo Bank Classic.

He won the silver medal in the junior time trial at the 2025 World Championships in Kigali, Rwanda.

In 2026, he rode for UCI WorldTeam Visma–Lease a Bike at the Grand Prix de Denain, where he was involved in the breakaway. He also rode for the elite team as a domestique for Wout van Aert during the 2026 Tour of Denmark, where van Aert won three stages and the general classification. He won the U23 race at the 2026 United States National Road Race Championships in June. He placed fourth as an 18 year-old at the under-23 time trial on 21 September at the 2026 UCI Road World Championships in Montreal. Later that week, on his nineteenth birthday, Barry won the World Championship title in the under-23 road race following a lone breakaway from a small group of riders that had formed with 100 km to ride, riding solo for the final 30 km. In doing so, he became the first ever winner of the race to represent the United States.

== Personal life ==
He is the son of former professional cyclists Michael Barry and Dede Demet. He has dual Canadian and American citizenship.

== Major results ==
=== Gravel ===
2024
UCI Gravel World Series

1st Ontario

=== Road ===
2024
National Junior Championships

1st Road race
1st Time trial

UCI World Junior Championships

5th Road race
9th Time trial

2025
1st Time trial, National Junior Championships
1st Overall Cottbus Juniors International

1st Stages 1 & 2

2nd Time trial, UCI World Junior Championships
2nd Paris–Roubaix Juniors
2nd E3 Saxo Classic Juniors
2026
UCI World Under-23 Championships

1st Road race
4th Time trial

1st Road race, National Under-23 Championships
1st Stage 4 Olympia's Tour
4th Road race, National Championships
5th Gent–Wevelgem U23
9th Poreč Classic
10th Rund um Köln

=== Track ===
2024
1st Madison, National Championships
2nd Omnium, UCI World Junior Championships
2025
UCI Nations Cup, Konya

2nd Team pursuit
2nd Omnium
