= Niels Driesen =

Belgian cyclist

- Driesen in 2026

Personal information
- Born: 25 August 2005 (age 21) Nieuwerkerken, Belgium

Cycling career
- Sport: Cycling
- Current team: Lotto–Groupe Wanty
- Discipline: Road
- Role: Rider

Amateur team
- 2022–2023: Acrog–Balen BC Junior

Professional teams
- 2024: Soudal–Quick-Step Devo Team
- 2025–2026: Lotto Development Team
Medal record
Representing Belgium
Men's road bicycle racing
European Championships
Bronze medal – third place	2026 Ljubljana	Under-23 road race

Niels Driesen (born 25 August 2005) is a Belgian cyclist, who currently rides for UCI Continental team Lotto–Groupe Wanty.

In 2026, he won the Ronde de l'Isard as well as the opening stage of the Tour de l'Avenir.

== Major results ==
2023
2nd Road race, National Junior Road Championships
2nd Overall Aubel–Thimister–Stavelot

1st Stage 2a (TTT)

4th Ronde van Vlaanderen Juniores
5th Paris–Roubaix Juniors
6th Overall Eroica Juniores–Nations' Cup
2024
5th Grand Prix de la ville de Pérenchies
2025
10th Overall Okolo Jižních Čech
2026
1st Overall Ronde de l'Isard

1st Points classification
1st Stage 2

1st Stage 1 Tour de l'Avenir
2nd Flèche Ardennaise
3rd Road race, UEC European Under-23 Road Championships
3rd Mur de Huy Classic
3rd Brussel-Opwijk
4th Overall Giro della Valle d'Aosta

1st Stage 2

5th Road race, UCI Road World Under-23 Championships
5th Road race, National Under-23 Road Championships
