= Lidl–Trek =

Lidl-Trek is a professional cycling team. It could refer to:

- Lidl–Trek (men's team), a UCI World Tour team
- Lidl–Trek (women's team), a UCI Women's World Tour team
- Lidl–Trek Future Racing, men's Lidl-Trek development team
