= 2025 UCI Road World Championships – Men's junior time trial =

Cycling event

Men's junior time trial
2025 UCI Road World Championships

Race details
- Dates: 23 September 2025
- Distance: 22.6 km (14.04 mi)
- Winning time: 29:07.61

Medalists
| | Gold | (Netherlands) Michiel Mouris (NED) |
| | Silver | (United States) Ashlin Barry (USA) |
| | Bronze | (Belgium) Seff Van Kerckhove (BEL) |

The Men's junior time trial of the 2025 UCI Road World Championships was a cycling event that took place on 23 September 2025 in Kigali, Rwanda.

== Final classification ==
| Pos. | Position in the time trial |
| Time | Time taken to complete the time trial |
| Diff | Deficit to the winner of the time trial |
| DNS | Denotes a rider who did not start |
| DNF | Denotes a rider who did not finish |
| DSQ | Denotes a rider who was disqualified from the race |
| OTL | Denotes a rider who finished outside the time limit |

| Rank | Rider | Country | Time | Diff. |
|---|---|---|---|---|
| 1st place, gold medalist(s) | Michiel Mouris | Netherlands | 29:07.61 | |
| 2nd place, silver medalist(s) | Ashlin Barry | United States | 29:14.45 | +6.84 |
| 3rd place, bronze medalist(s) | Seff Van Kerckhove | Belgium | 29:16.19 | +8.58 |
| 4 | Beckam Drake | United States | 29:21.16 | +13.55 |
| 5 | Max Hinds | Great Britain | 29:26.52 | +18.91 |
| 6 | Roberto Capello | Italy | 29:36.55 | +28.94 |
| 7 | Jan Jackowiak | Poland | 29:37.41 | +29.80 |
| 8 | Vilgot Reinhold | Sweden | 29:55.82 | +48.21 |
| 9 | Mattia Agostinacchio | Italy | 29:58.57 | +50.96 |
| 10 | Max Goold | Australia | 30:02.15 | +54.54 |
| 11 | Benjamín Noval | Spain | 30:04.66 | +57.05 |
| 12 | Theophile Vassal | France | 30:11.49 | +1:03.88 |
| 13 | Nicholas Van der Merwe | Bulgaria | 30:14.93 | +1:07.32 |
| 14 | Jerónimo Calderón | Colombia | 30:16.76 | +1:09.15 |
| 15 | Monty Rigby | Canada | 30:20.13 | +1:12.52 |
| 16 | Jakub Zaňka | Czech Republic | 30:23.62 | +1:16.01 |
| 17 | Heimo Fugger | Austria | 30:26.28 | +1:18.67 |
| 18 | Dylan Sage | Great Britain | 30:28.51 | +1:20.90 |
| 19 | Mats Vanden Eynde | Belgium | 30:30.58 | +1:22.97 |
| 20 | Johan Blanc | France | 30:38.37 | +1:30.76 |
| 21 | Kevin Estupiñán | Colombia | 30:44.62 | +1:37.01 |
| 22 | Benedikt Benz | Germany | 30:46.81 | +1:39.20 |
| 23 | Zeno Levi Winter | Germany | 30:48.95 | +1:41.34 |
| 24 | Georgs Tjumins | Latvia | 30:50.20 | +1:42.59 |
| 25 | Josh Johnson | South Africa | 30:55.38 | +1:47.77 |
| 26 | Vanja Kuntarič | Slovenia | 31:20.01 | +2:12.40 |
| 27 | Yaroslav Prosandeev | Individual Neutral Athletes | 31:29.40 | +2:21.79 |
| 28 | Eñaut Urkaregi | Spain | 31:30.01 | +2:22.40 |
| 29 | Kirill Chzhan | Kazakhstan | 31:48.46 | +2:40.85 |
| 30 | Tristan Hardy | Mauritius | 31:48.55 | +2:40.94 |
| 31 | Marouane Kharbouchi | Morocco | 31:56.08 | +2:48.47 |
| 32 | Gian Müller | Switzerland | 31:56.71 | +2:49.10 |
| 33 | Tom Stirnimann | Switzerland | 32:04.75 | +2:57.14 |
| 34 | Arash Mirbagheri | Iran | 32:05.91 | +2:58.30 |
| 35 | Murat Kuitenov | Kazakhstan | 32:09.36 | +3:01.75 |
| 36 | Roger Surén | Namibia | 32:10.81 | +3:03.20 |
| 37 | Ksawery Gancarz | Poland | 32:13.24 | +3:05.63 |
| 38 | Matvei Yakovlev | Individual Neutral Athletes | 32:13.89 | +3:06.28 |
| 39 | Lucas Stevenson | Australia | 32:16.67 | +3:09.06 |
| 40 | Bastian Petrič | Slovenia | 32:32.09 | +3:24.48 |
| 41 | Artyom Proskuryakov | Azerbaijan | 32:47.12 | +3:39.51 |
| 42 | Jakub Pastva | Slovakia | 32:48.23 | +3:40.62 |
| 43 | Yousuf Amiri | United Arab Emirates | 32:57.86 | +3:50.25 |
| 44 | Semere Fsehaye | Ethiopia | 33:02.61 | +3:55.00 |
| 45 | Omar Andrade Fernandez | Mexico | 33:11.90 | +4:04.29 |
| 46 | Oleh Smolynets | Ukraine | 33:28.28 | +4:20.67 |
| 47 | Paul Miro | Uganda | 33:32.33 | +4:24.72 |
| 48 | Gijs Schoonvelde | Netherlands | 33:42.27 | +4:34.66 |
| 49 | Antoine Bergeron | Canada | 33:46.20 | +4:38.59 |
| 50 | Hon Man Yip | Hong Kong | 33:51.74 | +4:44.13 |
| 51 | Salah Hamzioui | Algeria | 33:51.91 | +4:44.30 |
| 52 | Gokturk Yuzerler | Turkey | 34:30.69 | +5:23.08 |
| 53 | Pacifique Byusa | Rwanda | 34:34.97 | +5:27.36 |
| 54 | Raditia Etto Wijaya | Indonesia | 34:49.50 | +5:41.89 |
| 55 | Brian Ishimwe | Rwanda | 34:59.77 | +5:52.16 |
| 56 | Saifallah Ali Alsayed | Egypt | 35:00.07 | +5:52.46 |
| 57 | Muhammet Umut Demircan | Turkey | 35:06.15 | +5:58.54 |
| 58 | Kagaba Hatim | Uganda | 35:08.29 | +6:00.68 |
| 59 | Vinsya Ramadhana | Indonesia | 35:23.12 | +6:15.51 |
| 60 | Henri Rouillard | Mauritius | 35:40.24 | +6:32.63 |
| 61 | Younes Abdelghani | Qatar | 35:56.32 | +6:48.71 |
| 62 | Marco Thiel | Namibia | 36:10.91 | +7:03.30 |
| 63 | Exodus Saïzonou | Benin | 36:42.32 | +7:34.71 |
| 64 | Mohamed Amine Laouini | Tunisia | 36:51.50 | +7:43.89 |
| 65 | Denver Alphonse | Saint Lucia | 37:01.55 | +7:53.94 |
| 66 | Ian Kipchirchir | Kenya | 37:19.88 | +8:12.27 |
| 67 | Hafiz Sali | Qatar | 37:25.98 | +8:18.37 |
| 68 | Justiniano de Araújo | Angola | 37:33.36 | +8:25.75 |
| 69 | Prateek Ravla | Zimbabwe | 37:34.15 | +8:26.54 |
| 70 | Joseph Hatali | Tanzania | 37:46.06 | +8:38.45 |
| 71 | Osama Asha'ar | Jordan | 37:58.82 | +8:51.21 |
| 72 | Mahamadi Ouangraoua | Burkina Faso | 38:44.11 | +9:36.50 |
| 73 | Trevor Malvina | Seychelles | 38:44.31 | +9:36.70 |
| 74 | Saibou Kone | Mali | 38:44.77 | +9:37.16 |
| 75 | Sergio de Araújo | Angola | 38:46.59 | +9:38.98 |
| 76 | Waziri Masoli | Tanzania | 38:51.60 | +9:43.99 |
| 77 | Mohammad Hajeer | Jordan | 39:25.10 | +10:17.49 |
| 78 | Bakary Bagayogo | Mali | 40:22.02 | +11:14.41 |
| 79 | Sorydjan Keita | Guinea | 40:33.85 | +11:26.24 |
| 80 | Sivuyile Gulwako | Eswatini | 40:34.11 | +11:26.50 |
| 81 | Issouf Soidiki Irhamdine | Comoros | 42:53.58 | +13:45.97 |
| 82 | Mounkalia Yacouba Tinni | Niger | 43:40.67 | +14:33.06 |
| 83 | Babacar Atta Fall | Senegal | 44:41.09 | +15:33.48 |
| 84 | Frarrakhan Mohammed | Ghana | 44:48.29 | +15:40.68 |
| 85 | Sofiane Soumana | Niger | 47:58.32 | +18:50.71 |
