= Héctor Álvarez (cyclist) =

Spanish cyclist

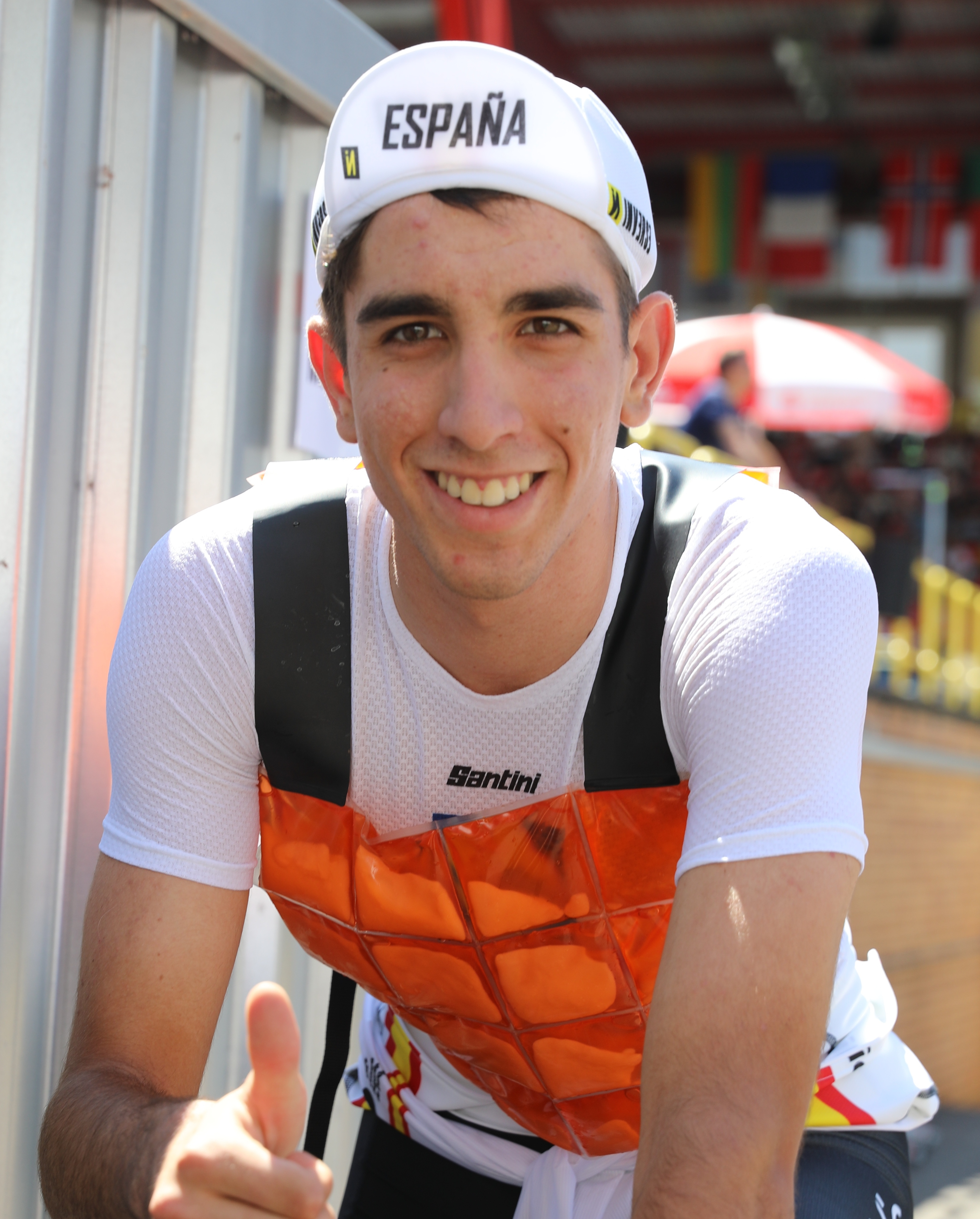
- Álvarez in 2024

Personal information
- Full name: Héctor Álvarez Martínez
- Born: 12 December 2006 (age 19) Benidorm, Spain
- Height: 1.90 m (6 ft 3 in)
- Weight: 74 kg (163 lb)

Cycling career
- Sport: Cycling
- Current team: Lidl–Trek Future Racing
- Discipline: Road
- Role: Rider

Amateur team
- 2023–2024: Lucta–Granja Rinya–InfinObras

Professional team
- 2025–: Lidl–Trek Future Racing
Medal record
Representing Spain
Men's road bicycle racing
World Championships
Silver medal – second place	2026 Montreal	Under-23 road race
Bronze medal – third place	2026 Montreal	Under-23 time trial
European Championships
Gold medal – first place	2026 Ljubljana	Under-23 road race
Gold medal – first place	2026 Ljubljana	Under-23 time trial
Silver medal – second place	2024 Limburg	Junior road race
Bronze medal – third place	2025 Guilherand-Granges	Under-23 road race
Men's track cycling
European Under-23 Championships
Gold medal – first place	2025 Anadia	Omnium
European Junior Championships
Gold medal – first place	2023 Anadia	Omnium

Héctor Álvarez Martínez (born 12 December 2006) is a Spanish cyclist, who currently rides for UCI Continental team Lidl–Trek Future Racing.

== Major results ==
=== Road ===
2023
1st Overall Vuelta a Talavera

1st Mountains classification
1st Points classification
1st Young rider classification
1st Stage 1

1st Trofeo Castillo de Ondo
2nd Overall Vuelta a Pamplona

1st Young rider classification

3rd Coppa Andrea Meneghelli
2024
1st Overall Vuelta a Cantabria

1st Mountains classification
1st Points classification
1st Stages 1 & 2

1st Overall La Philippe Gilbert Juniors

1st Mountains classification
1st Stage 2

1st Overall Eroica Juniores

1st Points classification

1st Overall Vuelta a Pamplona

1st Points classification

1st Overall Gipuzkoako Itzulia Junior

1st Points classification
1st Prologue & Stage 1

1st Gran Premio Ayuntamiento de Villamanín
1st Gran Premi Juniors La Pobla Llarga
1st Trofeo Castillo de Onda
1st Stage 2 Guido Reybrouck Classic
UEC European Junior Championships

2nd Road race
8th Time trial

2nd Time trial, National Junior Championships
2nd Overall Vuelta Junior a la Ribera del Duero

1st Mountains classification

2nd Overall Vuelta Ciclista a la Montaña Central de Asturias

1st Stage 2

3rd Overall Nation's Cup Hungary

1st Stage 1

6th Road race, UCI World Junior Championships
9th Paris–Roubaix Juniors
2025
UEC European Under-23 Championships

3rd Road race
7th Time trial

UCI World Under-23 Championships

4th Road race
9th Time trial

6th Overall Giro della Regione Friuli Venezia Giulia

1st Mountains classification
1st Young rider classification

2026
UEC European Under-23 Championships

1st Road race
1st Time trial

1st Paris–Tours Espoirs
1st Young rider classification, Tour of Belgium
UCI World Under-23 Championships

2nd Road race
3rd Time trial

2nd Trofeo Calvià
5th Paris–Roubaix Espoirs
6th Overall ZLM Tour

1st Young rider classification

=== Track ===
2023
1st Omnium, UEC European Junior Championships
2025
1st Omnium, UEC European Under-23 Championships
