= Alejandra Neira =

Spanish cyclist (born 2008)

Personal information
- Full name: Alejandra Neira Dominguez
- Born: 10 June 2008 (age 18) Santiago de Compostela, Spain
- Height: 1.67 m (5 ft 6 in)

Cycling career
- Sport: Cycling
- Current team: Movistar Team
- Discipline: Road
- Role: Rider
- Rider type: Time trialist; All-rounder

Amateur team
- 2025–2026: Baqué Movistar Team

Professional teams
- 2026: Movistar Team (stagiaire)
- 2027–: Movistar Team
Medal record
Representing Spain
Women's road bicycle racing
World Championships
Gold medal – first place	2026 Montreal	Junior road race
European Championships
Gold medal – first place	2026 Ljubljana	Junior time trial

Alejandra Neira Dominguez (born 10 June 2008) is a Spanish road cyclist who rides for Movistar Team. She won the Junior World Championships road race in 2026.

== Career ==
Neira finished 12th in the junior road race at the 2025 UCI Road World Championships, helping her teammate Paula Ostiz to victory. That year, she became the became the Spanish junior time trial champion and was the best young rider at the Tour du Gévaudan Occitanie Femmes.

Neira signed for Movistar Team in 2026, on a three year contract. That year, she won the Liège-Bastogne-Liège Women Juniors and a stage at the Tour du Gévaudan Occitanie femmes. In September, Neira won the junior title at the 2026 UCI Road World Championships in Montreal, Canada, winning the sprint from a small breakaway group. The following month, she won the junior time trial at the 2026 European Road Championships in Ljubljana, Slovenia.

== Major results ==
2025
1st Time trial, National Junior Road Championships
3rd Overall Tour du Gévaudan Occitanie Juniors

1st Young rider classification

5th Overall Watersley Ladies Challenge

1st Stage 3

6th Road race, European Junior Road Championships
8th Clásica de Jaén Nation's Cup Women
2026
UCI Road World Junior Championships

1st Road race
9th Time trial

National Junior Road Championships

1st Road race
1st Time trial

1st Liège–Bastogne–Liège Juniors
2nd Overall Watersley Ladies Challenge

1st Stage 3

2nd Overall Omloop van Borsele Juniors
2nd Overall Tour du Gévaudan Occitanie Juniors

1st Stage 2

2nd Clásica de Jaén Nation's Cup Women
2nd Valromey Tour Féminin II
3rd Valromey Tour Féminin III
5th Valromey Tour Féminin I
5th In Flanders Fields - In Ieper Juniors
8th Piccolo Trofeo Alfredo Binda
