= Nicolas Milesi (cyclist) =

Italian racing cyclist

Personal information
- Born: 22 July 2004 (age 22) Clusone, Italy
- Height: 1.85 m (6 ft 1 in)

Cycling career
- Sport: Cycling
- Current team: Netcompany Ineos Racing Academy
- Discipline: Road
- Role: Rider
- Rider type: Time trialist

Amateur team
- 2021–2022: Ciclistica Trevigliese

Professional teams
- 2023: Team Colpack–Ballan–CSB
- 2024–2025: Arkéa–B&B Hôtels Continentale
- 2026–: Ineos Grenadiers Racing Academy
Medal record
Men's road cycling
Representing Italy
World Championships
Silver medal – second place	2026 Montreal	Under-23 time trial
European Championships
Gold medal – first place	2022 Anadia	Junior team relay

Nicolas Milesi (born 22 July 2004) is an Italian cyclist, who rides for UCI Continental team Netcompany Ineos Racing Academy. He won a silver medal in the under-23 time trial at the 2026 UCI Road World Championships.

== Major results ==
2022
UEC European Junior Road Championships

1st Team relay
6th Time trial

National Junior Road Championships

3rd Road race
3rd Time trial

3rd Trofeo Buffoni
2023
2nd Time trial, National Under-23 Road Championships
4th Gran Premio Industrie del Marmo
2024
2nd Time trial, National Under-23 Road Championships
7th Eschborn–Frankfurt Under-23
9th Time trial, UEC European Under-23 Road Championships
2025
1st Stage 2 Giro della Regione Friuli Venezia Giulia
2nd Time trial, National Under-23 Road Championships
3rd Overall Tour Poitou-Charentes en Nouvelle-Aquitaine

1st Young rider classification

6th Time trial, UEC European Under-23 Road Championships
2026
1st Gran Premio Sportivi di Poggiana
1st Stage 2 (ITT) Olympia's Tour
2nd Time trial, UCI Under-23 Road World Championships
