= Ryan Gal =

Dutch cyclist

- Gal in 2025

Personal information
- Born: 7 March 2005 (age 21) Zevenaar, Netherlands
- Height: 1.85 m (6 ft 1 in)

Cycling career
- Sport: Cycling
- Current team: Metec–Solarwatt p/b Mantel
- Discipline: Road
- Role: Rider
- Rider type: Time trialist

Amateur team
- 2022–2023: Gepla-Watersley R&D Road Team

Professional teams
- 2024–2025: Development Team DSM–Firmenich PostNL
- 2026–: Metec–Solarwatt p/b Mantel
Medal record
Men's road cycling
Representing Netherlands
World Championships
Gold medal – first place	2026 Montreal	Under-23 time trial

Ryan Gal (born 7 March 2005) is a Dutch professional racing cyclist, who currently rides for UCI Continental team Metec–Solarwatt p/b Mantel. He won the under-23 time trial at the 2026 UCI Road World Championships.

== Major results ==
2023
1st Time trial, National Junior Road Championships
2025
7th Dorpenomloop Rucphen
2026
1st Time trial, UCI World Under-23 Road Championships
1st Time trial, National Under-23 Road Championships
1st Mountains classification, Alpes Isère Tour
1st Stage 4 Giro della Valle d'Aosta
8th Mur de Huy Classic
9th Overall Flèche du Sud
