= Liv Wenzel =

Luxembourgish cyclist (born 2004)

- Wenzel in 2025

Personal information
- Born: 8 January 2004 (age 22) Luxembourg

Cycling career
- Sport: Cycling
- Current team: Tirol
- Disciplines: Road; Cyclo-cross
- Role: Rider

Professional teams
- 2023–2025: Hess Cycling Team
- 2026–: Tirol Women Cycling
Medal record
Representing Luxembourg
Women's road cycling
European Championships
Bronze medal – third place	2026 Ljubljana	Mixed team relay

Liv Wenzel (born 8 January 2004) is a Luxembourgish road and cyclo-cross cyclist. She was a bronze medalist at the 2026 European Road Championships in the elite mixed relay.

== Career ==
Having started cycling at a young age, Wenzel represented Luxembourg at the 2019 European Youth Summer Olympic Festival in Baku. She rode for the Hess Cycling Team on the road as well as being the leader of the SebMotoBikes CX Team in cyclo-cross. Competing in cyclo-cross, Wenzel won the 2023 and 2024 Luxembourg U23 national championship title, and had a top 20 finish at the 2024 World Championships in the U23 category at the age of 20 years-old.

In 2026, Wenzel began to ride for Tirol Women Cycling. In July 2026, Wenzel won her second Luxembourg U23 women's title at the Four-Nation Cycling Championship, finishing third overall. She had first won the title in 2024. In October, she was a bronze medalist with the Luxembourg team at the 2026 European Road Championships in Ljubljana, Slovenia, in the elite team time trial.

== Personal life ==
She was educated at Sportlycée. Her brother Mats Wenzel is also a professional cyclist.
