= Jesper Stiansen =

Norwegian cyclist

- Stiansen in 2026

Personal information
- Born: 22 April 2005 (age 21) Kristiansand, Norway
- Height: 1.75 m (5 ft 9 in)
- Weight: 67 kg (148 lb)

Cycling career
- Sport: Cycling
- Current team: Tudor Pro Cycling Team U23
- Discipline: Road
- Role: Rider

Amateur team
- 2021–2024: Kristiansands CK

Professional teams
- 2025–2026: Tudor Pro Cycling Team U23
- 2027–: Tudor Pro Cycling Team
Medal record
Representing Norway
Men's road bicycle racing
World Championships
| Bronze medal – third place | 2026 Montreal | Under-23 road race |

Jesper Stiansen (born 22 April 2005) is a Norwegian cyclist, who currently rides for UCI Continental team Tudor Pro Cycling Team U23. He finished third in the under-23 road race at the 2026 UCI Road World Championships.

He will step up to UCI ProTeam Tudor Pro Cycling Team in 2027.

== Major results ==
2022
3rd Road race, National Junior Road Championships
2023
6th Overall Nation's Cup Hungary
2026
1st À travers les Hautes Fagnes
1st Stage 1 Ronde de l'Oise
3rd Road race, UCI Road World Under-23 Championships
3rd Liège–Bastogne–Liège U23
5th Overall Tour de Bretagne
7th Overall Istrian Spring Tour
7th Gran Premio Sportivi di Poggiana
