= OFX (company) =

Australian foreign exchange and payments company

OFX Limited
- Formerly: OzForex (1998–2015)
- Type: Public
- Traded as: ASX: OFX
- Industry: Financial technology Foreign exchange
- Founded: 1998; 28 years ago in Sydney, Australia
- Founder: Matthew Gilmour
- Headquarters: Sydney, Australia
- Areas served: Worldwide
- Key people: John "Skander" Malcolm (CEO); Patricia Cross (chair)
- Products: OFX platform
- Services: International money transfers Foreign exchange Corporate treasury Card issuing and spend management
- Website: ofx.com

OFX Group Limited is an Australian financial technology company that provides international payments, foreign exchange and spend management services. It is headquartered in Sydney and listed on the Australian Securities Exchange.

== History ==
=== 1998–2015: OzForex ===
OFX Group was founded as OzForex in 1998 by Matthew Gilmour, then head of foreign exchange at Bankers Trust. He initially operated the business part-time from his home on Sydney's Northern Beaches before committing to it full-time in 2000.

In 2001, OzForex launched its first online money transfer service and obtained an Australian Financial Services Licence in 2003.

By 2005, OzForex had opened an office in London and Gilmour's former Bankers Trust colleague Gary Lord became a joint shareholder and managing director. In June 2007, Macquarie Bank acquired a 51 percent controlling interest in OzForex, and former Macquarie executive Neil Helm was appointed chief executive officer.

In 2009, OFX began providing international money transfer services through ING Direct. In November 2010, Accel Partners and The Carlyle Group made minority investments in the company and became members of its board.

In 2013, OzForex was listed on the Australian Securities Exchange. The initial public offering valued the company at A$480 million. The offering was jointly managed by Macquarie and Goldman Sachs. In the same year, OFX also entered a white label partnership with MoneyGram in the United Kingdom.

In February 2015, Helm left his role as CEO and was succeeded by former ANZ Bank executive Richard Kimber in May 2015. In the same year, the company consolidated its regional brands, including UKForex, CanadianForex, USForex, NZForex, ClearFX, and Tranzfers, under the OFX name. The rebranding began in Australia in December 2015..

=== 2015–present: OFX ===
In November 2015, Western Union made a non-binding proposal to acquire OFX for between A$3.50 and A$3.70 per share, valuing the company at up to A$888 million. The discussions ended in February 2016 after Western Union did not submit a binding offer.

In February 2017, John Alexander "Skander" Malcolm, a former president of GE Capital in Australia and New Zealand, was appointed CEO and managing director, replacing Kimber.

In May 2021, OFX invested US$6.1 million in TreasurUp, a Netherlands-based treasury management software company spun off from Rabobank, as part of a Series A funding round.

In May 2022, OFX acquired Edmonton-based Firma Foreign Exchange Corporation for C$90 million, equivalent to approximately A$98 million. OFX completed the acquisition of Firma's UK business in September 2022 after receiving approval from the Financial Conduct Authority.

In May 2023, OFX acquired Sydney-based business-to-business payments company Paytron, which was later merged into the new OFX 2.0 platform.

In February 2026, OFX appointed Goldman Sachs as its financial advisor and began a review to sell the business. In July 2026, OFX announced a non-binding A$1.00-per-share takeover proposal from Equals, at a valuation of A$247 million.

== Products and services ==
OFX divides its services into three segments: consumer, corporate, and enterprise. Its OFX 2.0 platform supports international payments, multi-currency business accounts, corporate cards, expense management, accounts payable automation, foreign exchange services, and accounting integrations across more than 30 currencies and 180 countries.

== Operations ==
OFX is headquartered in Sydney with additional offices in London, Dublin, Auckland, Hong Kong, Singapore, Toronto, and San Francisco.

OFX holds an Australian Financial Services Licence and is registered with AUSTRAC as a remittance provider. Its UK and Irish subsidiaries are authorised as electronic money institutions, while its US and Canadian entities are registered and licensed as money services or remittance businesses. The group also holds regulatory authorisations in New Zealand, Singapore, and Hong Kong.
