= Cole Kessler =

American cyclist (born 2003)

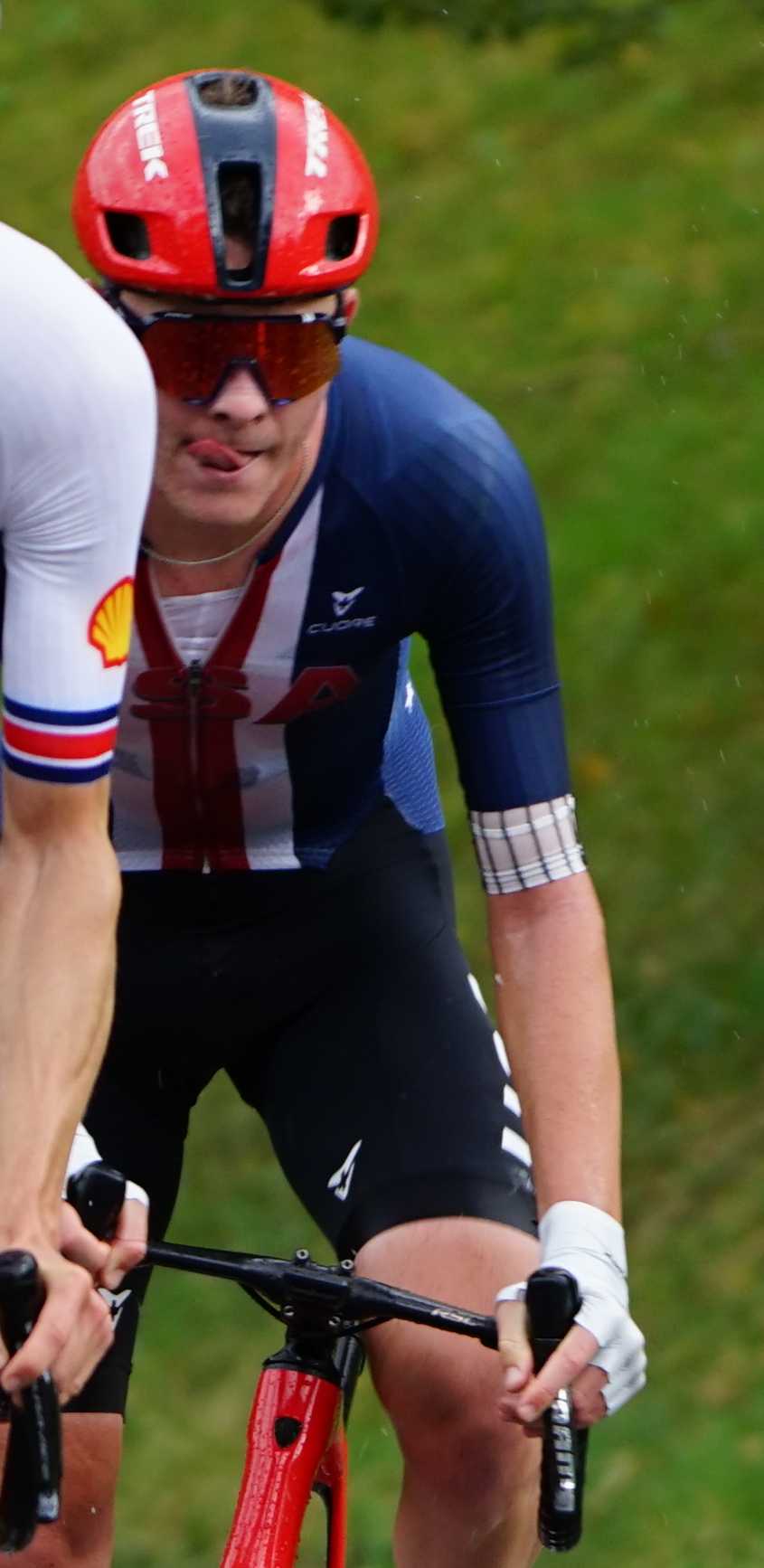
- Kessler at the 2024 UCI Road World Championships

Personal information
- Born: 20 May 2003 (age 23) Los Angeles
- Height: 1.98 m (6 ft 6 in)
- Weight: 75 kg (165 lb)

Cycling career
- Sport: Cycling
- Current team: Modern Adventure Pro Cycling
- Discipline: Road
- Role: Rider

Amateur team
- 2021: LUX Cycling

Professional teams
- 2022–2023: Israel–Premier Tech Israel Cycling Academy
- 2024–2025: EF Education–EasyPost
- 2026–: Modern Adventure Pro Cycling

Cole Kessler (born 20 May 2003) is American racing cyclist, who currently rides for UCI ProTeam Modern Adventure Pro Cycling.

== Biography ==
From Newbury Park, California, Kessler attended Newbury Park High School. He began riding mountain bikes when he was in middle school. After transitioning to road cycling he joined Boost CycleSport in 2019 and then the LUX U19 Development cycling team. He became American junior national time trial champion in 2021, and won the time trial at French race Ronde Des Valles. He signed with Israel Cycling Academy ahead of the 2022 season, on a two-year contract.

Kessler rode for UCI Continental team Lidl–Trek Future Racing in 2024 and 2025. In May 2025, Kessler won the under-23 individual time trial in Charleston, West Virginia at the 2025 United States National Time Trial Championships. Kessler placed eleventh and was the top American finisher in the men's under-23 time trial at the 2025 UCI Road World Championships in Rwanda.

Ahead of the 2026 season, Kessler joined American team Modern Adventure Pro Cycling, a professional team having their debut season launched and managed by George Hincapie.

== Major results ==
2021
1st Time trial, National Junior Road Championships
2nd Overall Ronde des Vallées

1st Stage 2 (ITT)

2023
8th GP Capodarco
8th Gran Premio Sportivi di Poggiana
2025
1st Time trial, National Under-23 Road Championships
6th Il Lombardia U23
