= Coen Boerman =

Dutch cyclist

Personal information
- Born: 11 November 1976 (age 49) Almelo, Netherlands

Cycling career
- Sport: Cycling
- Current team: Retired
- Discipline: Road
- Role: Rider

Amateur team
- 1998–1999: Rabobank Beloften

Professional team
- 2000–2002: Rabobank

Coen Boerman (born 11 November 1976) is a Dutch former cyclist, who competed as a professional from 2000 to 2002 with Rabobank. He rode in the 2000 Giro d'Italia and the 2001 and 2002 Paris–Roubaix.

== Major results ==
1996
1st Rund um Köln Amateurs
1997
1st Stage 9 Olympia's Tour
3rd Road race, National Under-23 Road Championships
1998
1st Kattekoers
1st Internatie Reningelst
2nd Overall Tour du Loir-et-Cher
2nd ZLM Tour
3rd Time trial, National Under-23 Road Championships
6th Overall Olympia's Tour
1999
1st Stage 1 Circuit des Mines
1st Stage 4 Volta a Lleida
3rd Overall Olympia's Tour
3rd Internationale Wielertrofee Jong Maar Moedig
2001
3rd Ronde van Noord-Holland
2002
1st Stage 1 (ITT) Guldensporentweedaagse
5th Nokere Koerse
