= Matteo Milan =

Italian cyclist

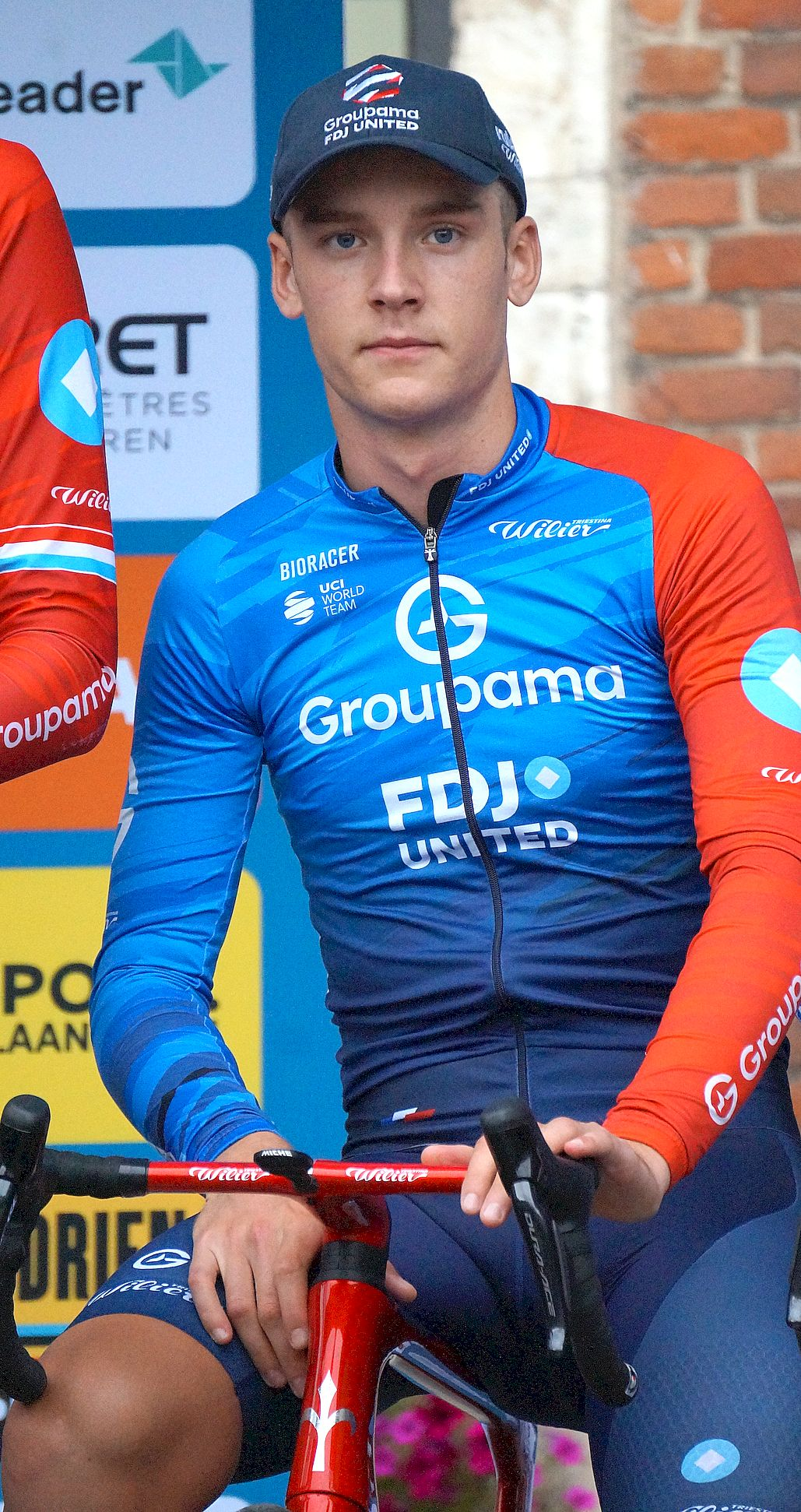
- Milan in 2026

Personal information
- Born: 22 January 2003 (age 23) Tolmezzo, Italy

Cycling career
- Sport: Cycling
- Current team: Groupama–FDJ United
- Discipline: Road
- Role: Rider

Amateur team
- 2020–2021: Danieli 1914 Cycling Team

Professional teams
- 2022–2023: Cycling Team Friuli ASD
- 2024–2025: Lidl–Trek Future Racing
- 2026–: Groupama–FDJ United

Matteo Milan (born 22 January 2003) is an Italian racing cyclist, who currently rides for UCI WorldTeam Groupama–FDJ United.

His father Flavio and older brother Jonathan are also cyclists.

After leaving the junior ranks, Milan joined Cycling Team Friuli ASD in 2022, before moving to Lidl–Trek Future Racing in 2024. In March 2025, Milan took his first elite win at the Poreč Classic, followed by a stage win at the Alpes Isère Tour in May.

== Major results ==
2022
1st Trofeo Festa Patronale
1st Stage 1 (TTT) Giro della Regione Friuli Venezia Giulia
2023
2nd Gran Premio La Torre
2024
4th Time trial, National Under-23 Road Championships
2025
1st Poreč Classic
1st Stage 3 Alpes Isère Tour
8th Umag Classic
