= Danique Braam =

Dutch cyclist (born 1995)

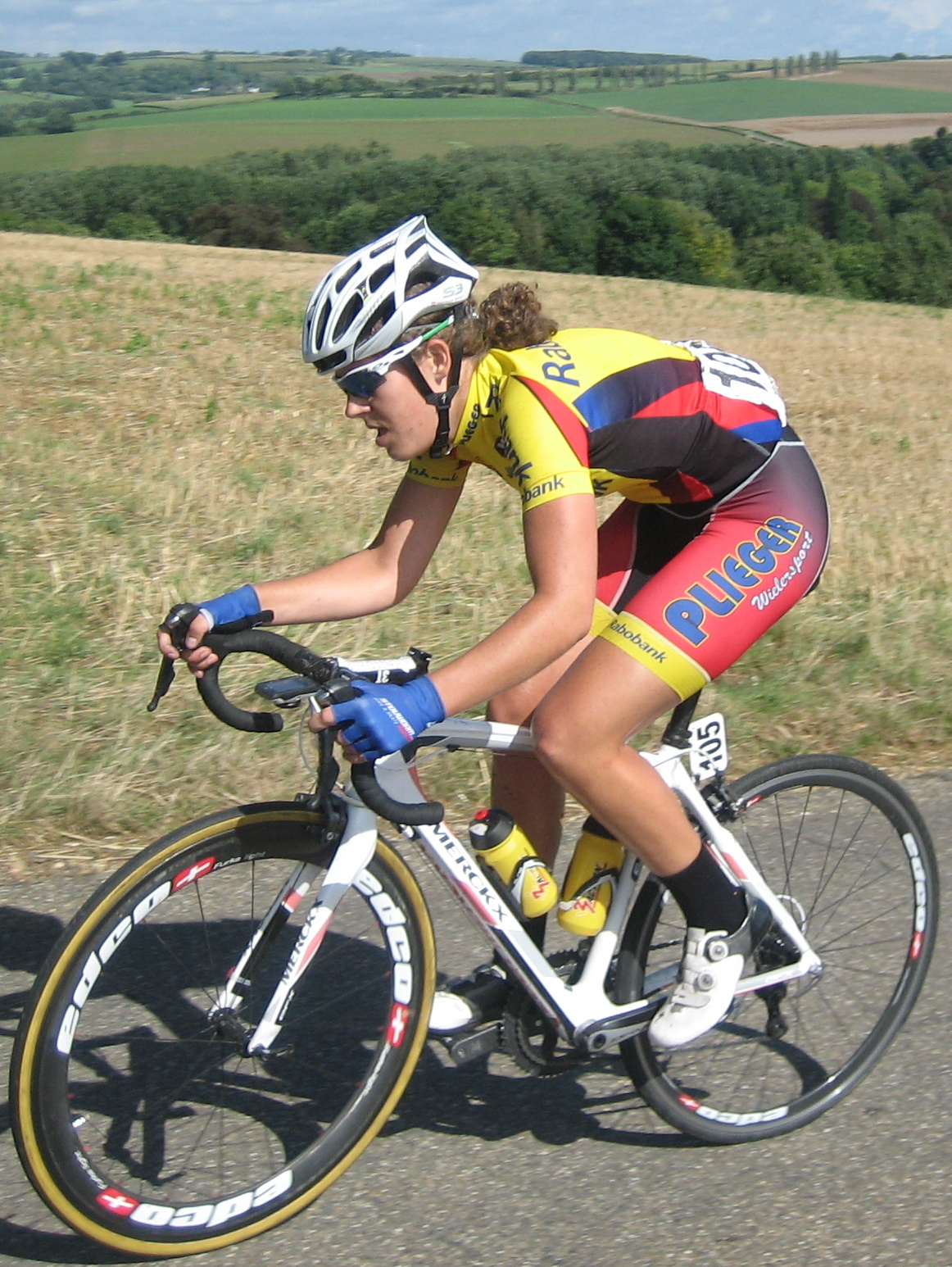
- Braam in 2016

Personal information
- Full name: Danique Braam
- Born: 5 September 1995 (age 31)

Cycling career
- Sport: Cycling
- Current team: Hess Cycling Team
- Discipline: Road
- Role: Rider

Amateur teams
- 2016–2018: RC Jan van Arckel
- 2025–: Hess Cycling Team

Professional teams
- 2019–2021: Lotto–Soudal Ladies
- 2022–2024: Bingoal Casino–Chevalmeire–Van Eyck Sport

Danique Braam (born 5 September 1995) is a Dutch professional racing cyclist, who currently rides for UCI Women's Continental Team Hess Cycling Team. She 'is known for her tactical acumen and teamwork, making her a key asset, especially in sprint finishes.'

Braam joined Hess Cycling Team for the 2025 season.

== Major results ==
2022
1st GP Mazda Schelkens
4th Veenendaal–Veenendaal Classic
5th Flanders Diamond Tour
5th Grote Prijs Beerens
