= Michiel Mouris =

Dutch cyclist

Personal information
- Born: 7 February 2007 (age 19) Amstelveen, Netherlands

Cycling career
- Sport: Cycling
- Current team: Team Grenke–Auto Eder
- Disciplines: Road; Cyclo-cross
- Role: Rider

Amateur teams
- 2024: Wielerploeg Groot Amsterdam
- 2025: Team Grenke–Auto Eder
Medal record
Representing Netherlands
Men's road cycling
World Championships
Gold medal – first place	2025 Kigali	Junior time trial
European Championships
Gold medal – first place	2024 Limburg	Junior time trial
Gold medal – first place	2024 Limburg	Junior team relay
Gold medal – first place	2025 Guilherand-Granges	Junior time trial

Michiel Mouris (born 7 February 2007) is a Dutch cyclist. He won the junior time trial at the 2025 World Championships.

== Career ==
His brother Wessel is also a cyclist. In 2022, at the age of 15 years-old, he created headlines when he won the Amsterdam cyclo-cross, beating Dylan Groenewegen in second, with his brother third.

In 2024, he won the junior time trial at the 2024 European Road Championships. In 2025, Mouris became the Dutch junior national time trial champion and won the Paris–Roubaix Juniors riding for Grenke–Auto Eder.

He won the junior time trial at the 2025 World Championships in Kigali, Rwanda, in September 2025. The following week, he retained his junior time trial title at the 2025 European Road Championships.

== Major results ==
=== Road ===
2024
UEC European Junior Championships

1st Time trial
1st Team relay

1st Time trial, National Junior Championships
1st Young rider classification, Penn Ar Bed-Pays d’Iroise
1st Bergomloop Berg en Terblijt
1st Wielerdag Roden
3rd Overall Acht van Bladel

1st Points classification
1st Young rider classification
1st Stage 4 (TTT)

2025
1st Time trial, UCI World Junior Championships
1st Time trial, UEC European Junior Championships
1st Time trial, National Junior Championships
1st Overall Acht van Bladel

1st Stage 3b

1st Overall Grand Prix West Bohemia

1st Points classification
1st Stages 1 & 2

1st Paris–Roubaix Juniors
1st Stage 2a (TTT) Aubel–Thimister–Stavelot
2nd Overall Guido Reybrouck Classic

1st Stage 2

2026
9th Time trial, UCI World Under-23 Championships

=== Cyclo-cross ===
2022–2023
1st Amsterdam
2023–2024
1st Essen Juniors
1st Heerderstrand Juniors
1st Rucphen Juniors
2nd Nacht van Woerden Juniors
Junior Superprestige

3rd Niel

2024–2025
1st National Junior Championships
Junior Superprestige

1st Gullegem

UCI Junior World Cup

3rd Zonhoven
