= Gent–Wevelgem U23 =

Belgian one-day road cycling race

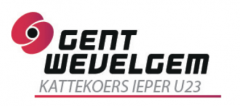

Race details
- Date: April
- Region: Flanders, Belgium
- Local name: Kattekoers (in Dutch)
- Discipline: Road
- Competition: UCI Europe Tour
- Type: One-day race
- Web site: www.inflandersfieldsmiddelkerkewevelgem.be/nl/wedstrijd/jeugd/wedstrijdinfo

History
- First edition: 1934
- Editions: 84 (as of 2026)
- First winner: Alfons Ghesquière (BEL)
- Most wins: Stefaan Vermeersch (BEL) (3 wins)
- Most recent: Cameron Rogers (AUS)

The Gent–Wevelgem U23 / Kattekoers-Ieper is a European single day cycle race held in the Belgian region of Flanders. As of 2011, the race is organized as a 1.2 event on the UCI Europe Tour. The race is considered to be the under-23 version of the Gent–Wevelgem classic.

The Kattekoers was created in 1934, initially as The three belfry cities. The race started in Ghent, passed Bruges and ended in Ypres, three cities which have a belfry, hence the name. More recently, the starting location has been changed to Deinze instead of Ghent.

== Winners ==
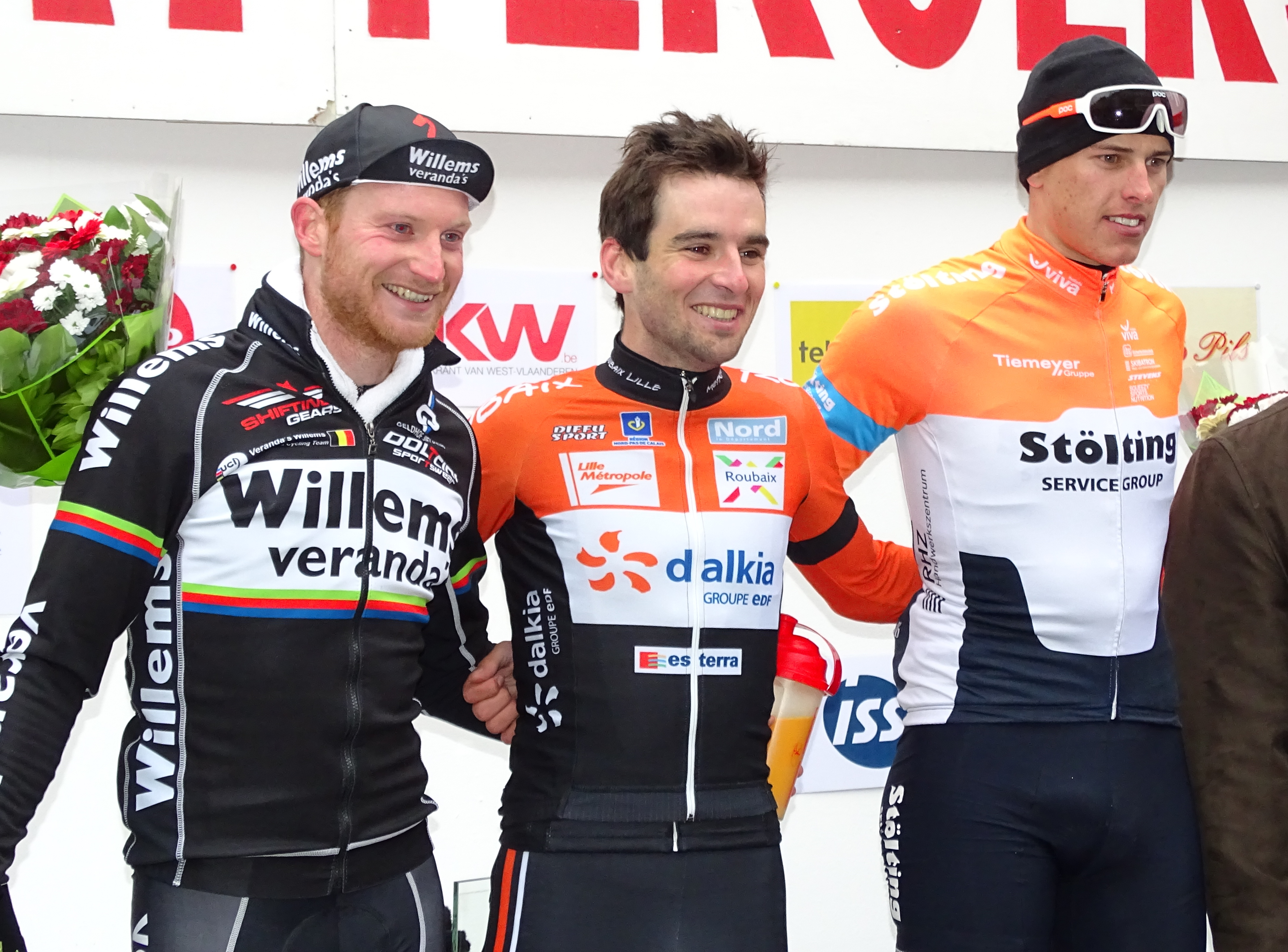
Kattekoers 2015 : Joeri Calleeuw (2), Baptiste Planckaert (1) & Nils Politt (3).

Year	Country	Rider	Team
1934	Belgium	Alfons Ghesquière	
1935	Belgium	Filemond Demeersseman	
1936	Belgium	Marcel Meerenhout	
1937	Belgium	Marcel Kint	
1938	Belgium	Aloïs Delchambre	
1939	Belgium	Leon Kint	
1940– 1945	No race		
1946	Belgium	Pol Verhaeghe	
1947	Belgium	Omer Porte	
1948	Belgium	Gerard Deschacht	
1949	Belgium	Maurits Joye	
1950	Belgium	Gentil Vermeersch	
1951	Belgium	André Noyelle	
1952	Belgium	Jos Parmentier	
1953	Belgium	Albert Eloot	
1954	Belgium	Emiel Van Cauter	
1955	Belgium	Jos Verhelst	
1956	Belgium	Piet Dejongh	
1957	Belgium	René Muylle	
1958	No race		
1959	Belgium	Wim Vandenbroeck	
1960	Belgium	Robert Lelangue	
1961	Belgium	Gilbert Lingier	
1962	Belgium	Willy Stevens	
1963	Belgium	Jos Spruyt	
1964	Belgium	Herman Vanloo	
1965	Belgium	Noël Van Clooster	
1966	Belgium	Leo Vandam	
1967	Belgium	Jos Vanmechele	
1969	Belgium	Emile Cambre	
1970	Belgium	Ludo Vander Linden	
1971	Belgium	Theo Dockx	
1972	Belgium	José Vanacker	
1973	Belgium	René Dillen	
1975	Belgium	Franky Degendt	
1976	Belgium	Pol Clinckaert	
1977	Belgium	Fons Dewolf	
1978	Belgium	Walter Schoonjans	
1979	Belgium	Eddy Planckaert	
1980	Belgium	Eddy Planckaert	
1981	Belgium	Jos Liekens	
1982	Belgium	Rudy Delehouzee	
1983	Belgium	Frank Verleyen	
1984	Belgium	Patrick Verplancke	
1985	Belgium	Patrick Verplancke	
1986	Belgium	Walter Vandenbrande	
1987	Belgium	Johny Dauwe	
1988	Belgium	Patrick Hendrickx	
1989	Belgium	Chris Lefever	
1990	Belgium	Claude de Bodt	
1991	Belgium	Daniël Verelst	
1992	Belgium	Niko Eeckhout	
1993	Belgium	Stefaan Vermeersch	
1994	Belgium	Robby Vandaele	
1995	Belgium	Yves Seghers	
1996	Belgium	Jürgen Vermeersch	
1997	Belgium	Karl Vereecke	
1998	Netherlands	Coen Boerman	
1999	Belgium	Kevin Hulsmans	
2000	Belgium	Bert Dewaele	
2001	Belgium	Stefaan Vermeersch	
2002	Australia	Sean Sullivan	
2003	Belgium	Kenny Lisabeth	
2004	Belgium	Stefaan Vermeersch	
2005	Belgium	Frank Van Kuik	
2006	Belgium	Greg Van Avermaet	
2007	Belgium	Sébastien Delfosse	
2008	Belgium	Ken Vanmarcke	
2009	Belgium	Sander Armée	Beveren 2000
2010	Belgium	Fréderique Robert	PWS Eijssen
2011	Belgium	Jonas van Genechten	Wallonie Bruxelles–Crédit Agricole
2012	Belgium	Roy Jans	An Post–Sean Kelly
2013	Belgium	Jérôme Baugnies	ToWin-Josan Cycling Team
2014	Poland	Łukasz Wiśniowski	Etixx
2015	Belgium	Baptiste Planckaert	Roubaix–Lille Métropole
2016	Denmark	Mads Pedersen	Denmark (national team)
2017	Great Britain	Jacob Hennessy	Great Britain (national team)
2018	Slovenia	Žiga Jerman	Slovenia (national team)
2019	Germany	Jonas Rutsch	Germany (national team)
2020– 2021	No race		
2022	Great Britain	Samuel Watson	Great Britain (national team)
2023	Belgium	Gil Gelders	Soudal–Quick-Step Devo Team
2024	Netherlands	Huub Artz	Wanty–ReUz–Technord
2025	Italy	Alessandro Borgo	Bahrain Victorious Development Team
2026	Australia	Cameron Rogers	INEOS Grenadiers Racing Academy

== See also ==
- Belfry of Bruges
- Belfry of Ghent
