= Money transfer =

Money transfer generally refers to one of the following cashless modes of payment or payment systems:

- Electronic funds transfer, an umbrella term mostly used for bank card-based payments
- Giro (banking), also known as direct deposit
- Money order, transfer by postal cheque, money gram or others
- Postal order, purchased at a post office and is payable at another post office to the named recipient
- Wire transfer, an expedited bank-to-bank funds transfer

== Cash-based wire transfer systems ==
- al-Barakat, an informal money transfer system originating in the Arab world
- Currency exchange, transfer for of one currency to another
- Hawala (also known as hundi), an informal system primarily used to send money
- Remittance, a transfer of money by a foreign worker to his or her home country

== See also ==
- Cash carrier
- Foreign exchange company
- Money transmitter
- Transfer payment
