= UCI Road World Championships – Junior men's road race =

UCI Road World Championships – Men's junior road race is the annual world championship race for road bicycle racing for men in the Junior category. It is organised by the world governing body, the Union Cycliste Internationale. In the period 2005–2009 this event was part of the UCI Juniors World Championships, then the UCI Juniors Road World Championships in 2010. In 2020 no junior race was held due to the COVID-19 pandemic.

The winner of the event is entitled to wear the rainbow jersey in Junior competitions for one year.

== Palmares ==
Games	Gold	Silver	Bronze
1975	Roberto Visentini (ITA)	Ad Verstijlen (NED)	Alberto Massuco (ITA)
1976	Ronald Bessems (NED)	Corrado Donadio (ITA)	Jiri Korous (TCH)
1977	Ronny Van Holen (BEL)	Per-Ove Carlsson (SWE)	Edwin Menzi (SUI)
1978	Vladimir Makarkin (URS)	Hubert Denstedt (GDR)	Thomas Landis (SUI); Alguis Waitkus (URS)
1979	Greg LeMond (USA)	Kenny De Maerteleire (BEL)	J. Fr. Dury (FRA)
1980	Roberto Ciampi (ITA)	Eric Vanderaerden (BEL)	Sergei Navolokin (URS)
1981	Beat Schumacher (SUI)	Oleg Chushda (URS)	Philippe Bouvatier (FRA)
1982	Roger Six (BEL)	Andreas Lux (GDR)	Yury Abramov (URS)
1983	Søren Lilholt (DEN)	Oleg Emelianov (URS)	Michael Gozzi (SWE)
1984	Tom Cordes (NED)	Franco Cavallini (ITA)	Alex Pedersen (DEN)
1985	Raymond Meijs (NED)	Evgueni Zagrebelni (URS)	Jean-Jacques Henry (FRA)
1986	Michel Zanoli (NED)	Richard Luppes (NED)	Bart Leysen (BEL)
1987	Pavel Tonkov (URS)	Erik Dekker (NED)	Josef Lontscharitsch (AUT)
1988	Gianluca Tarocco (ITA)	Vassili Davidenko (URS)	Alessandro Bertolini (ITA)
1989	Patrick Vetsch (SUI)	Danny Sleeckx (BEL)	Steffen Wesemann (GDR)
1990	Marco Serpellini (ITA)	Igor Dziouba (URS)	Bogdan Fink (YUG)
1991	Jeff Evanshine (USA)	Tony Morphett (AUS)	Eddy Mazzoleni (ITA)
1992	Giuseppe Palumbo (ITA)	Pasquale Santoro (ITA)	Frank Vandenbroucke (BEL)
1993	Giuseppe Palumbo (ITA)	Mariano Friedick (USA)	Michele Rezzani (ITA)
1994	Miguel Morrás Mangado (ESP)	Laurent Lefèvre (FRA)	Eladio Jimenez Sanchez (ESP)
1995	Valentino China (ITA)	Ivan Basso (ITA)	Rinaldo Nocentini (ITA)
1996	Holger Loew (GER)	Jacob Nielsen (DEN)	Claudio Astolfi (ITA)
1997	Crescenzo D'Amore (ITA)	Martin Bolt (SUI)	Margus Salumets (EST)
1998	Mark Scanlon (IRL)	Filippo Pozzato (ITA)	Eduard Kivitchev (RUS)
1999	Damiano Cunego (ITA)	Ruslan Kayumov (RUS)	Christophe Kern (FRA)
2000	Jeremy Yates (NZL)	Antonio Bucciero (ITA)	Alexandr Arekeev (RUS)
2001	Oleksandr Kvachouk (UKR)	Niels Scheuneman (NED)	Mathieu Perget (FRA)
2002	Arnaud Gérard (FRA)	Jukka Vastaranta (FIN)	Nicolas Sanderson (AUS)
2003	Kai Reus (NED)	Anders Lund (DEN)	Lukas Fus (CZE)
2004	Roman Kreuziger (CZE)	Rafaâ Chtioui (TUN)	Simon Špilak (SLO)
2005	Ivan Rovny (RUS)	Timofey Kritskiy (RUS)	Sebastian Hans (GER)
2006	Diego Ulissi (ITA)	Niki Østergaard (DEN)	Tony Gallopin (FRA)
2007	Diego Ulissi (ITA)	Daniele Ratto (ITA)	Elia Favilli (ITA)
2008	Johan Le Bon (FRA)	Mattia Cattaneo (ITA)	Sebastian Lander (DEN)
2009	Jasper Stuyven (BEL)	Arnaud Démare (FRA)	Marco Haller (AUT)
2010	Olivier Le Gac (FRA)	Jay McCarthy (AUS)	Jasper Stuyven (BEL)
2011 (details)	Pierre-Henri Lecuisinier (FRA)	Martijn Degreve (BEL)	Steven Lammertink (NED)
2012 (details)	Matej Mohorič (SLO)	Caleb Ewan (AUS)	Josip Rumac (CRO)
2013 (details)	Mathieu van der Poel (NED)	Mads Pedersen (DEN)	Nikaj Iltjan (ALB)
2014 (details)	Jonas Bokeloh (GER)	Alexandr Kulikovskiy (RUS)	Peter Lenderink (NED)
2015 (details)	Felix Gall (AUT)	Clément Bétouigt-Suire (FRA)	Rasmus Pedersen (DEN)
2016 (details)	Jakob Egholm (DEN)	Niklas Markl (GER)	Reto Müller (SUI)
2017 (details)	Julius Johansen (DEN)	Luca Rastelli (ITA)	Michele Gazzoli (ITA)
2018 (details)	Remco Evenepoel (BEL)	Marius Mayrhofer (GER)	Alessandro Fancellu (ITA)
2019 (details)	Quinn Simmons (USA)	Alessio Martinelli (ITA)	Magnus Sheffield (USA)
2021 (details)	Per Strand Hagenes (NOR)	Romain Grégoire (FRA)	Madis Mihkels (EST)
2022 (details)	Emil Herzog (GER)	António Morgado (POR)	Vlad Van Mechelen (BEL)
2023 (details)	Albert Philipsen (DEN)	Paul Fietzke (GER)	Felix Ørn-Kristoff (NOR)
2024 (details)	Lorenzo Finn (ITA)	Sebastian Grindley (GBR)	Senna Remijn (NED)
2025 (details)	Harry Hudson (GBR)	Johan Blanc (FRA)	Jan Jackowiak (POL)

=== Medallists by nation ===
Rank	Nation	Gold	Silver	Bronze	Total
1	Italy	12	10	9	31
2	Netherlands	6	4	3	13
3	France	4	5	6	15
4	Belgium	4	4	4	12
5	Denmark	4	4	3	11
6	Germany	3	3	1	7
7	United States	3	1	1	5
8	Soviet Union	2	5	3	10
9	Switzerland	2	1	3	6
10	Russia	1	3	2	6
11	Great Britain	1	1	0	2
12	Austria	1	0	2	3
13	Czech Republic	1	0	1	2
13	Norway	1	0	1	2
13	Slovenia	1	0	1	2
13	Spain	1	0	1	2
17	Ireland	1	0	0	1
17	New Zealand	1	0	0	1
17	Ukraine	1	0	0	1
20	Australia	0	3	1	4
21	East Germany	0	2	1	3
22	Sweden	0	1	1	2
23	Finland	0	1	0	1
23	Portugal	0	1	0	1
23	Tunisia	0	1	0	1
26	Estonia	0	0	2	2
27	Albania	0	0	1	1
27	Croatia	0	0	1	1
27	Czechoslovakia	0	0	1	1
27	Poland	0	0	1	1
27	Yugoslavia	0	0	1	1
Totals (31 entries)		50	50	51	151
