= 2026 UCI Road World Championships =

Cycling world championships

- Location within Canada
- Venue: Montreal, Quebec, Canada
- Date: 20–27 September 2026
- Coordinates: 45°30′32″N 73°33′15″W
- Events: 13

The 2026 UCI Road World Championships was the 99th edition of the UCI Road World Championships, the annual world championships for road bicycle racing. It was held from 20 to 27 September 2026 in Montreal, Quebec, Canada.

The championships marked the return of the UCI Road World Championships to Montreal 52 years after the city hosted the 1974 edition, which was the first time the event was held outside Europe. It was the third time Canada hosted the event, after Montreal in 1974 and Hamilton in 2003.

A total of thirteen events were held, consisting of six road races, six individual time trials and a team time trial mixed relay. Approximately 1,000 athletes from around 75 countries were expected to compete.

== Background ==
The event was awarded to Montreal at the UCI Congress held during the 2022 UCI Road World Championships in Wollongong, Australia. The event was organized by the promoter of the Grand Prix Cycliste de Québec et de Montréal, with support from Cycling Canada.

The Canadian federal government announced a CA$13-million investment to support the hosting of the championships, with CA$9.8 million from Sport Canada through the Hosting Program and CA$3.2 million from Canada Economic Development for Quebec Regions.

The event was expected to be the largest sporting event in Montreal since the 1976 Summer Olympics. Admission to all events was free of charge.

== Course ==
The routes were unveiled during the 2025 UCI Road World Championships in Kigali, Rwanda.

=== Road races ===
The road races featured a final circuit of 13.4 kilometres (8.3 mi) around Mount Royal in downtown Montreal, with 269 metres (883 ft) of elevation gain per lap. The circuit included the Voie Camillien-Houde climb (2.3 kilometres (1.4 mi) at 6.2% average gradient), the Chemin de la Polytechnique with sections exceeding 11% gradient, and a false flat rising along Avenue du Parc, which served as the finish line for all thirteen events. The circuit was similar to that used by the Grand Prix Cycliste de Montréal, as well as previous cycling events in Montréal such as the 1974 UCI Road World Championships and 1976 Summer Olympics.

The elite men's road race covered 273.4 kilometres (169.9 mi) with 3,803 metres (12,477 ft) of total elevation gain, while the elite women's road race spanned 180.1 kilometres (111.9 mi) with 2,570 metres (8,430 ft) of elevation gain. Both elite road races started in Brossard, in the Montérégie region, before passing through several municipalities and crossing the Samuel De Champlain Bridge to reach the Mount Royal circuit in downtown Montréal.

=== Time trials ===
Amateur bikers ride the time trial course in Old Montreal on 19 September.

For the first time since 2022, the time trial courses for elite men and women was identical in length – a 39.2-kilometre (24.4-mile) route through Montreal, racing along the Saint Lawrence River, crossing the St. Lawrence River, passing through the Circuit Gilles Villeneuve, and returning via the Concorde Bridge.

=== Virtual route ===
Online indoor exercise platform and host of the 2026 UCI Cycling Esports World Championships, MyWhoosh, had a virtual route replicating the Mont Royal final circuit of the road races.

== Schedule ==
All events started and finished in Montreal, with the exception of the elite road races, which started at Quartier DIX30 in Brossard. Avenue du Parc served as the finish line for all events.

All times listed below were for the local time – Eastern Daylight Time or UTC−04:00.

=== Individual time trials ===
Date	Timings		Event	Location (start)	Location (finish)	Distance
20 September	09:00	11:20	Elite women	Montreal		39.2 km (24.4 mi)
20 September	12:45	15:15	Elite men	Montreal		39.2 km (24.4 mi)
21 September	09:00	10:40	Under-23 women	Montreal		20.3 km (12.6 mi)
21 September	12:00	14:25	Under-23 men	Montreal		31.3 km (19.4 mi)
22 September	12:15	14:25	Junior men	Montreal		20.3 km (12.6 mi)
22 September	15:15	16:45	Junior women	Montreal		10.7 km (6.6 mi)

=== Mixed event ===
Date	Timings		Event	Location (start)	Location (finish)	Distance	Laps (Note: This denotes the number of laps of the 20.3-kilometre (12.6-mile) circuit; the first lap is completed by three male riders, with the second lap completed by three female riders.)
22 September	08:30	11:15	Mixed team relay	Montreal		40.6 km (25.2 mi)	2

=== Road races ===
Date	Timings		Event	Location (start)	Location (finish)	Distance	Laps (Note: This denotes the number of full laps completed of the 13.4-kilometre (8.3-mile) Mount Royal circuit.)
24 September	09:00	12:45	Under-23 women	Montreal	Montreal	134 km (83 mi)	10
24 September	13:30	17:00	Junior men	Montreal	Montreal	134 km (83 mi)	10
25 September	09:00	13:20	Under-23 men	Montreal	Montreal	174.2 km (108.2 mi)	13
25 September	14:15	16:35	Junior women	Montreal	Montreal	80.4 km (50.0 mi)	6
26 September	09:00	14:10	Elite women	Brossard	Montreal	180.1 km (111.9 mi)	8
27 September	09:00	15:40	Elite men	Brossard	Montreal	273.4 km (169.9 mi)	12

== Medal summary ==
=== Elite events ===
Event	Gold		Silver		Bronze	
Men's Events
Men's road race	Brandon McNulty; United States	6h 17'04"	Michael Matthews; Australia	+13"	Mathieu van der Poel; Netherlands	+13"
Men's time trial	Remco Evenepoel; Belgium	44'53.13"	Filippo Ganna; Italy	+57.31"	Paul Seixas; France	+1'13.04"
Women's Events
Women's road race	Demi Vollering; Netherlands	4h 45'09"	Katarzyna Niewiadoma; Poland	+ 0"	Elisa Longo Borghini; Italy	+ 4"
Women's time trial	Marlen Reusser; Switzerland	50'24.44"	Zoe Bäckstedt; Great Britain	+40.11"	Franziska Koch; Germany	+45.54"
Mixed Event
Mixed relay	Italy; Mattia Cattaneo; Filippo Ganna; Matteo Sobrero; Vittoria Guazzini; Elisa Longo Borghini; Monica Trinca Colonel	51' 32.28"	France; Bruno Armirail; Rémi Cavagna; Jordan Labrosse; Juliette Berthet; Cédrine Kerbaol; Marion Borras	+ 8.63"	Switzerland; Stefan Bissegger; Stefan Küng; Jasmin Liechti; Marlen Reusser; Noemi Rüegg; Mauro Schmid	+ 19.90"

=== Under-23 events ===
Event	Gold		Silver		Bronze	
Men's Under-23 Events
Men's under-23 road race	Ashlin Barry; United States	4h 17'35"	Héctor Álvarez; Spain	+53"	Jesper Stiansen; Norway	+53"
Men's under-23 time trial	Ryan Gal; Netherlands	37'26.16"	Nicolas Milesi; Italy	+07.01"	Héctor Álvarez; Spain	+11.88"
Women's Under-23 Events
Women's under-23 road race	Viktória Chladoňová; Slovakia	3h 49'10"	Isabella Holmgren; Canada	+0"	Fleur Moors; Belgium	+33"
Women's under-23 time trial	Felicity Wilson-Haffenden; Australia	27'40.72"	Nienke Vinke; Netherlands	+28.47"	Luca Vierstraete; Belgium	+45.07"

=== Junior events ===
Event	Gold		Silver		Bronze	
Men's Juniors Events
Men's junior road race	Benjamín Noval; Spain	3h 23'35"	Simon Defrance; France	+42"	Elias Wändel; Sweden	+2'12"
Men's junior time trial	Benjamín Noval; Spain	25'17.35"	Vic De Smet; Belgium	+6.35"	Malthe Risbjerg; Denmark	+16.97"
Women's Juniors Events
Women's junior road race	Alejandra Neira; Spain	2h 21'00"	Matilde Rossignoli; Italy	+0"	Anja Grossman; Switzerland	+0"
Women's junior time trial	Maria Okrucińska; Poland	15'17.51"	Yana Decruyenaere; Belgium	+12.25"	Aalia Clay; Great Britain	+24.51"

== Medal table ==
* Host nation (Canada)

Rank	Nation	Gold	Silver	Bronze	Total
1	Spain	3	1	1	5
2	Netherlands	2	1	1	4
3	United States	2	0	0	2
4	Italy	1	3	1	5
5	Belgium	1	2	2	5
6	Australia	1	1	0	2
6	Poland	1	1	0	2
8	Switzerland	1	0	2	3
9	Slovakia	1	0	0	1
10	France	0	2	1	3
11	Great Britain	0	1	1	2
12	Canada*	0	1	0	1
13	Denmark	0	0	1	1
13	Germany	0	0	1	1
13	Norway	0	0	1	1
13	Sweden	0	0	1	1
Totals (16 entries)		13	13	13	39
