= Cameron Rogers (cyclist) =

Australian cyclist

Personal information
- Born: 16 December 2004 (age 21) Canberra
- Height: 188 cm (6 ft 2 in)

Cycling career
- Sport: Cycling
- Current team: Lidl–Trek Future Racing
- Discipline: Road
- Role: Rider

Professional teams
- 2023: Lotto–Dstny Development Team
- 2024–: Lidl–Trek Future Racing

Cameron Rogers (born 16 December 2004) is an Australian cyclist who rides for UCI Continental team Lidl–Trek Future Racing.

== Early and personal life ==
Born in Canberra, he is the son of cyclist Peter and Raeleigh (née Tennant) Rogers, a triathlete. He has a younger brother Luke who also competes as a cyclist. He is the nephew former professional cyclists Deane Rogers and Michael Rogers.

== Career ==
In 2021, at the age of 16 years-old, he won three Australian under-19 national championships. He first won the Australian criterium championships and then won the points race and omnium titles racing on the track.

In 2022, he won the Australian junior road race title and a set a junior national record of 3:13.271 in the 3,000m individual pursuit at the Oceania championships in Brisbane on 3 April 2002. Later that year he was awarded a scholarship from Sport Australia Hall of Fame. In September 2022, Rogers finished 22nd in the junior men's road race at the world championships. In October 2022, he signed for Lotto–Dstny Development Team.

Ahead of the 2024 season he signed for UCI Continental team Lidl–Trek Future Racing. He won the prologue at the Tour of Austria on 2 July 2024, finishing a second ahead of two-time time trial world champion Filippo Ganna.

== Major results ==
2022
National Junior Road Championships

1st Road race
2nd Time trial

Oceania Junior Road Championships

2nd Road race
6th Time trial

2024 (1 pro win)
1st Prologue Tour of Austria
2025
7th Grote Prijs Rik Van Looy
2026
1st Gent–Wevelgem Beloften
5th Overall International Tour of Rhodes

1st Prologue
