= Lidl–Trek Future Racing =

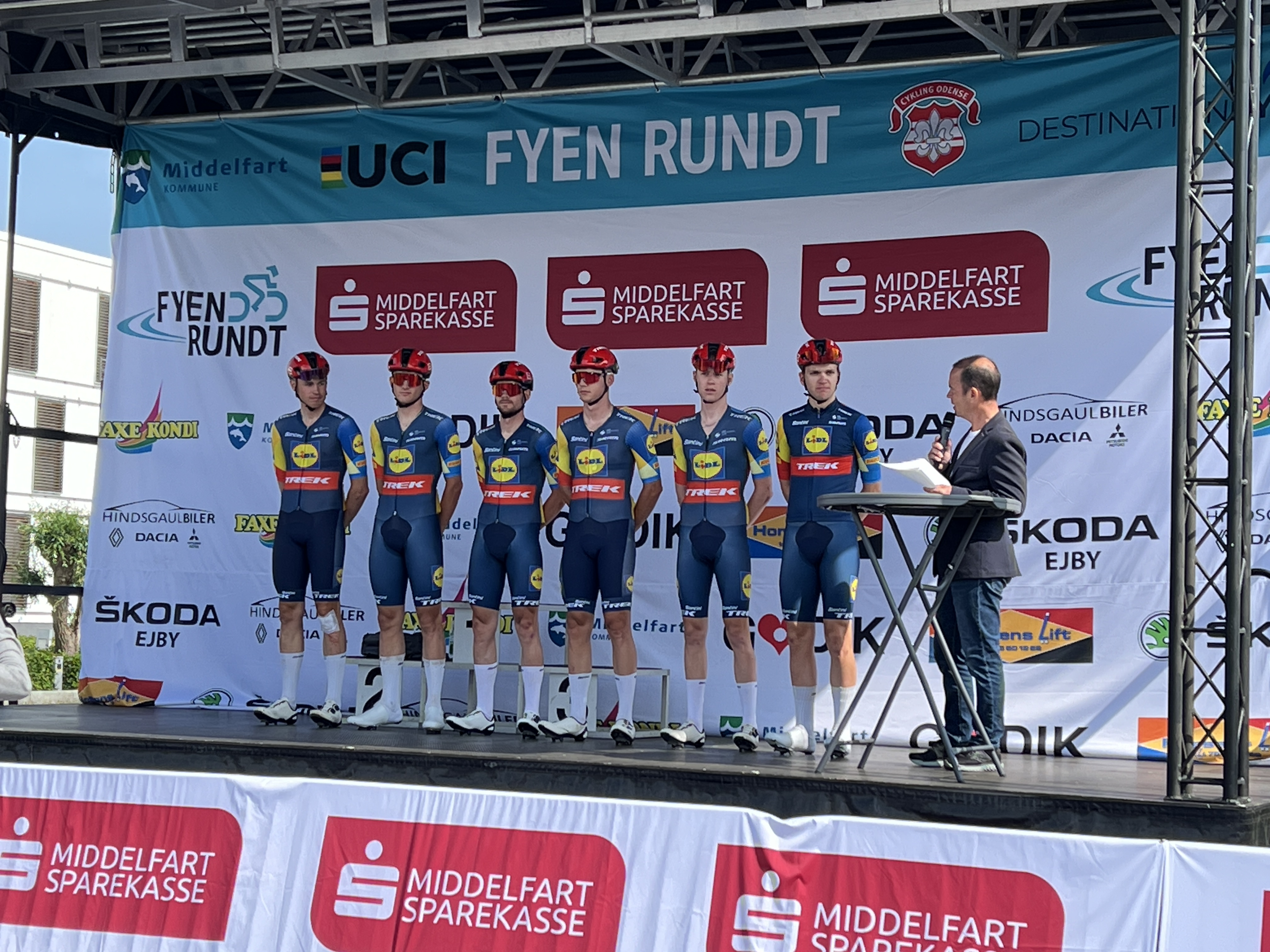

Team information
- UCI code: LTF
- Registered: United States
- Founded: 2024
- Discipline: Road
- Status: UCI Continental

Key personnel
- Team manager: Markel Irizar

Team name history
- 2024–: Lidl–Trek Future Racing

Lidl–Trek Future Racing is an American UCI Continental cycling team that was founded in 2024. It acts as the development program for UCI WorldTeam Lidl–Trek.

== Team roster ==
As of 2 July 2025.

Rider	Date of birth
Nils Aebersold (SUI)	15 February 2003 (age 23)
Héctor Álvarez (ESP)	12 December 2006 (age 19)
Andrea Bessega (ITA)	30 March 2006 (age 20)
Kristian Egholm (DEN)	16 March 2004 (age 22)
Aleix Espargaró (ESP)	30 July 1989 (age 37)
Sebastian Grindley (GBR)	24 April 2006 (age 20)
Patrick Frydkjær (DEN)	19 March 2005 (age 21)
Cole Kessler (USA)	20 May 2003 (age 23)

Rider	Date of birth
Louis Leidert (GER)	16 May 2005 (age 21)
Matteo Milan (ITA)	22 January 2003 (age 23)
Liam O'Brien (IRL)	16 May 2005 (age 21)
Martin Pedersen (DEN)	28 January 1998 (age 28)
Cameron Rogers (AUS)	16 December 2004 (age 21)
Jakob Söderqvist (SWE)	31 May 2003 (age 23)
Paul Verbnjak (AUT)	18 December 2001 (age 24)
Jack Ward (AUS)	2 May 2005 (age 21)

== Major wins ==
2024
Youngster Coast Challenge, Niklas Behrens
Overall Olympia's Tour, Tim Torn Teutenberg
Paris–Roubaix Espoirs, Tim Torn Teutenberg
Overall Tour de Bretagne, Jakob Söderqvist

Stage 1, Tim Torn Teutenberg
Stage 3, Jakob Söderqvist

Stage 1 Flèche du Sud, Tim Torn Teutenberg
Stages 4 (ITT) & 5 Flèche du Sud, Jakob Söderqvist
Stage 1 (ITT) Giro Next Gen, Jakob Söderqvist
Sweden National Time Trial, Jakob Söderqvist
Germany National Under-23 Time Trial, Tim Torn Teutenberg
Luxembourg National Under-23 Time Trial, Mats Wenzel
Germany National Under-23 Road Race, Tim Torn Teutenberg
Luxembourg National Under-23 Road Race, Mats Wenzel
Prologue Tour of Austria, Cameron Rogers
Chrono des Nations U23, Jakob Söderqvist
2025
Poreč Trophy, Matteo Milan
Stage 1 Circuit des Ardennes, Patrick Frydkjær
Paris–Roubaix Espoirs, Albert Philipsen
United States National Under-23 Time Trial, Cole Kessler
Stage 3 Alpes Isère Tour, Matteo Milan
Sweden National Time Trial, Jakob Söderqvist

== National champions ==
2024
Swedish Time Trial, Jakob Söderqvist
German Under-23 Time Trial, Tim Torn Teutenberg
Luxembourg Under-23 Time Trial, Mats Wenzel
German Under-23 Road Race, Tim Torn Teutenberg
Luxembourg Under-23 Road Race, Mats Wenzel
2025
United States Under-23 Time Trial, Cole Kessler
Swedish Time Trial, Jakob Söderqvist
