= Benjamín Noval (cyclist, born 2008) =

Spanish cyclist (born 2008)

Personal information
- Full name: Benjamín Noval Suárez
- Born: 7 October 2008 (age 18) Pola de Laviana, Spain
- Height: 1.78 m (5 ft 10 in)

Cycling career
- Sport: Cycling
- Current team: MMR Academy
- Disciplines: Road; Cyclo-cross
- Role: Rider

Amateur team
- 2025–2026: MMR Academy

Professional team
- 2027–: Netcompany–Ineos
Medal record
Men's road cycling
Representing Spain
World Championships
Gold medal – first place	2026 Montreal	Junior time trial

Benjamín Noval Suárez (born 7 October 2008) is a Spanish junior road bicycle racer. He is the son of former professional cyclist Benjamín Noval.

In 2025, at age 16, Noval signed a contract with UCI WorldTeam INEOS Grenadiers, one of the youngest signings in the team's history, and is scheduled to ride with the team starting in 2027. Noval also rides cyclo-cross, winning the Spanish junior championship in 2025.

== Major results ==
=== Cyclo-cross ===
2024–2025
1st National Junior Championships
1st Overall Junior Copa de España

1st Gijón
1st Marin-Pontevedra
1st Karrantza
1st Tarancón
1st Alcobendas

UCI Junior World Cup

2nd Zonhoven
4th Dublin
4th Benidorm

4th UCI World Junior Championships
4th UEC European Junior Championships
2025–2026
1st National Junior Championships
Junior Copa de España

1st Alcobendas
1st Xàtiva
1st Cocentaina

Junior X²O Trophy

2nd Hofstade

UCI Junior World Cup

3rd Hoogerheide
4th Koksijde
4th Benidorm

Junior Superprestige

3rd Heusden-Zolder

4th UCI World Junior Championships

=== Mountain bike ===
2025
1st Cross-country, National Junior Championships
2026
1st Cross-country, National Junior Championships

=== Road ===
2025
National Junior Championships

1st Road race
1st Time trial

1st Overall GP F.W.R. Baron

1st Points classification
1st Youth classification
1st Stage 3

1st Overall Vuelta Ciclista al Besaya

1st Points classification
1st Mountains classification
1st Youth classification
1st Stages 1 & 4

1st Overall Vuelta Ciclista a la Montaña Central

1st Points classification
1st Mountains classification
1st Youth classification

1st Overall Vuelta Challenge Junior Carballo

1st Prologue & Stage 1

1st Overall Vuelta a la Subbética

1st Points classification
1st Youth classification
1st Stages 1 & 3

1st Ciudad de Baneza
1st Memorial Chely Alvarez
1st Trofeo Santiago Santana
1st Trofeo Vicente Lopez Carril
1st Memorial José Luis Junco
2026
UCI World Junior Championships

1st Road race
1st Time trial

1st Time trial, UEC European Junior Championships
National Junior Championships

1st Road race
1st Time trial

1st Overall Ain Bugey Valromey Tour

1st Mountains classification
1st Stage 1

1st Overall Vuelta Ciclista Valles Cántabros

1st Mountains classification
1st Stage 3

1st Overall Vuelta Ciclista a la Montaña Central

1st Points classification
1st Mountains classification
1st Stages 2, 3 & 4

1st Overall Vuelta al Besaya Juniors

1st Points classification
1st Mountains classification
1st Stage 4

1st Urduña Hiria Junior Klasika Jr
1st Gran Premio El Baruco
1st Oñati Proba
1st San Bartolomé Saria-Zegama
