= Jan Jackowiak =

Polish cyclist

- Jackowiak in 2025

Personal information
- Born: 23 December 2007 (age 18) Toruń, Poland
- Height: 1.85 m (6 ft 1 in)
- Weight: 65 kg (143 lb)

Cycling career
- Sport: Cycling
- Current team: Bahrain Victorious Development Team
- Discipline: Road
- Role: Rider

Amateur team
- 2024–2025: Cannibal–Victorious U19 Development Team

Professional team
- 2026–: Bahrain Victorious Development Team
Medal record
Representing Poland
Men's road bicycle racing
World Championships
Bronze medal – third place	2025 Kigali	Junior road race
European Championships
Silver medal – second place	2026 Ljubljana	Under-23 road race

Jan Michał Jackowiak (born 23 December 2007) is a Polish professional racing cyclist, who rides for UCI Continental team Bahrain Victorious Development Team.

== Major results ==
2025
National Junior Road Championships

1st Road race
1st Time trial

1st Overall Course de la Paix Juniors
1st Mountains classification, Grand Prix West Bohemia
2nd Overall Gran Premio FWR BARON
UCI Junior Road World Championships

3rd Road race
7th Time trial

3rd Ronde van Vlaanderen Juniors
3rd Gran Premio San Vicente-Costa Blanca
UEC European Junior Road Championships

4th Time trial
7th Road race

5th Overall Giro della Lunigiana
5th Paris–Roubaix Juniors
10th Overall Aubel–Thimister–Stavelot
2026
1st Trofeo Città di San Vendemiano
1st GP Capodarco
2nd Road race, UEC European Under-23 Road Championships
5th Overall Oberösterreich Rundfahrt
6th Overall Giro di Sardegna

1st Young rider classification

8th Overall Tour de l'Avenir
