= 2024 British Cycling National Track Championships =

British cycling event

- Venue: Manchester
- Date(s): 23–25 February 2024
- Velodrome: Manchester Velodrome

The 2024 British Cycling National Track Championships were a series of track cycling competitions. The National Track Championships (excluding certain events) were held from 23 to 25 February 2024 at the Manchester Velodrome in Manchester. They are organised and sanctioned by British Cycling, and are open to British cyclists.

The Derny, Omnium, Madison, Tandem and Elimination events take place at various other dates throughout the year.

== Medal summary ==
=== Men ===
Event	Gold	Silver	Bronze	Ref
1 km Time trial	Aaron Pope	Niall Monks	Henry Hobbs	
Sprint	Pete Mitchell	Marcus Hiley	Harry Ledingham-Horn	
Keirin	Hayden Norris	Niall Monks	Harvey McNaughton	
Team sprint	Team Inspired A Ed Lowe; Hayden Norris; Harry Ledingham-Horn	Team Inspired B Marcus Hiley; Harry Radford; Joe Truman	ESV Manchester; Oliver Aloul; Tom Morrissey; Matt Rotherham	
Individual pursuit	Michael Gill	Will Roberts	Matthew Brennan	
Team pursuit	Team Wales; Sam Fisher; Will Roberts; Will Salter; Finlay Tarling	WKG – WardPerformanceUK; Sebastian Garry; Michael Gill; Will Perrett; Tom Ward	Not awarded	
Points	William Perrett	Will Roberts	Noah Hobbs	
Scratch	Sam Fisher	Archie Fletcher	Will Roberts	

=== Women ===
Event	Gold	Silver	Bronze	Ref
500m time trial	Rhianna Parris-Smith	Milly Tanner	Lowri Thomas	
Sprint	Lauren Bell	Rhian Edmunds	Georgette Rand	
Keirin	Lauren Bell	Rhian Edmunds	Amy Cole	
Team sprint	Team Inspired A Georgette Rand; Milly Tanner; Sophie Capewell	Team Inspired B Rhian Edmunds; Iona Moir; Rhianna Parris-Smith	PD Scotland; Lucy Grant; Kirsty Johnson; Christina Smith	
Individual pursuit	Kate Richardson	Frankie Hall	Izzy Sharp	
Team pursuit	Team Inspired; Maddie Leech; Grace Lister; Kate Richardson; Izzy Sharp	Tofauti Everyone Active; Mari Porton; Erin Boothman; Carys Lloyd; Abigail Miller	Solas Cycling; Molly Evans; Millie Thomson; Isla McCutcheon; Kayla Dinnin	
Points	Jenny Holl	Kate Richardson	Frankie Hall	
Scratch	Jenny Holl	Maddie Leech	Cat Ferguson	

== National Paracycling Track Championships ==
The National Paracycling Track Championships took place concurrently with the National Track Championships from 23–25 February 2024 at the Manchester Velodrome.

=== Men ===
Event	Class	Gold	Silver	Bronze
Sprint	B	James Ball; Pilot: Steffan Lloyd	Neil Fachie; Pilot: Matthew Rotherham	Thomas Wing; Pilot: Joshua Dunham
1km time trial	C2	Matthew Robertson	Ryan Taylor	Callum Deboys
1km time trial	C3	Jaco van Gass	Finlay Graham	Jacob Smith
1km time trial	C4	Jody Cundy	Archie Atkinson	Wayne Harrod
1km time trial	C5	Blaine Hunt	Alex Jones	Samuel Davies
1km time trial	B	Neil Fachie; Pilot: Matthew Rotherham	James Ball; Pilot: Steffan Lloyd	Thomas Wing; Pilot: Joshua Dunham
Individual pursuit	C2	Matthew Robertson	Ryan Taylor	Callum Deboys
Individual pursuit	C3	Finlay Graham	Jaco van Gass	Jacob Smith
Individual pursuit	C4	Archie Atkinson	Nicholas Fairfield	Wayne Harrod
Individual pursuit	C5	Blaine Hunt	William Bjergfelt	Alex Jones
Individual pursuit	B	Steve Bate; Pilot: Mitchell Powell	Chris McDonald; Pilot: Adam Duggleby	Christopher Wilkins; Pilot: Henry Latimer

=== Women ===
Event	Class	Gold	Silver	Bronze
500m time trial	C1	Katie Toft		
500m time trial	C2	Daphne Schrager	Elisabeth Simpson	Leah O'Connell
500m time trial	C5	Rebecca Newark		
1km time trial	B	Lora Fachie; Pilot: Corrine Hall	Natalie Jamieson; Pilot: Emily Chilton	Sophie Unwin; Pilot: Jenny Holl
Individual pursuit	C1	Katie Toft		
Individual pursuit	C2	Amelia Cass	Leah O'Connell	Daphne Schrager
Individual pursuit	C5	Morgan Newberry	Rebecca Newark	
Individual pursuit	B	Lora Fachie; Pilot: Corrine Hall	Sophie Unwin; Pilot: Jenny Holl	Natalie Jamieson; Pilot: Emily Chilton

== Other events ==
=== Men ===
Event	Venue & date	Gold	Silver	Bronze	Ref
Derny	Herne Hill, 18 May	Alec Briggs	Tom Ward	James Ambrose-Parish	
Madison	Lee Valley, 15 Jun	Frank Longstaff; Tom Ward	Alec Briggs; Joe Holt	James Ambrose-Parish; William Gilbank	
Omnium	Lee Valley, 17 Aug	William Roberts	Michael Gill	Frank Longstaff	

=== Women ===
Event	Venue & date	Gold	Silver	Bronze	Ref
Derny	Herne Hill, 31 Aug	Miriam Jessett	Charlotte Parnham	Hannah Williams	
Madison	Lee Valley, 27 Jul	not held			
Omnium	Lee Valley, 7 Sep	not held			

=== Open ===
Event	Venue & date	Gold	Silver	Bronze	Ref
Tandem	Newcastle-under-Lyme, 25 Aug	David Heald; Peter Boyd	Sean Sleigh; Andrew Mason	Thomas Boyd	
