= British National Individual Pursuit Championships =

British cycling national competition

The British National Individual Pursuit Championships are held annually as part of the British National Track Championships organised by British Cycling. A women's championship was held for the first time in 1960.

The race is contested over 4,000 metres but the former Professional version was contested over 5,000 metres.

== Past Winners ==
=== Men's 4,000 metres Senior Race ===
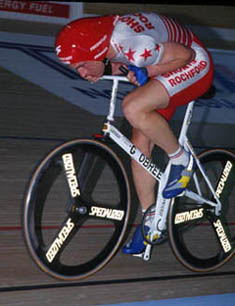
Graeme Obree, four times champion

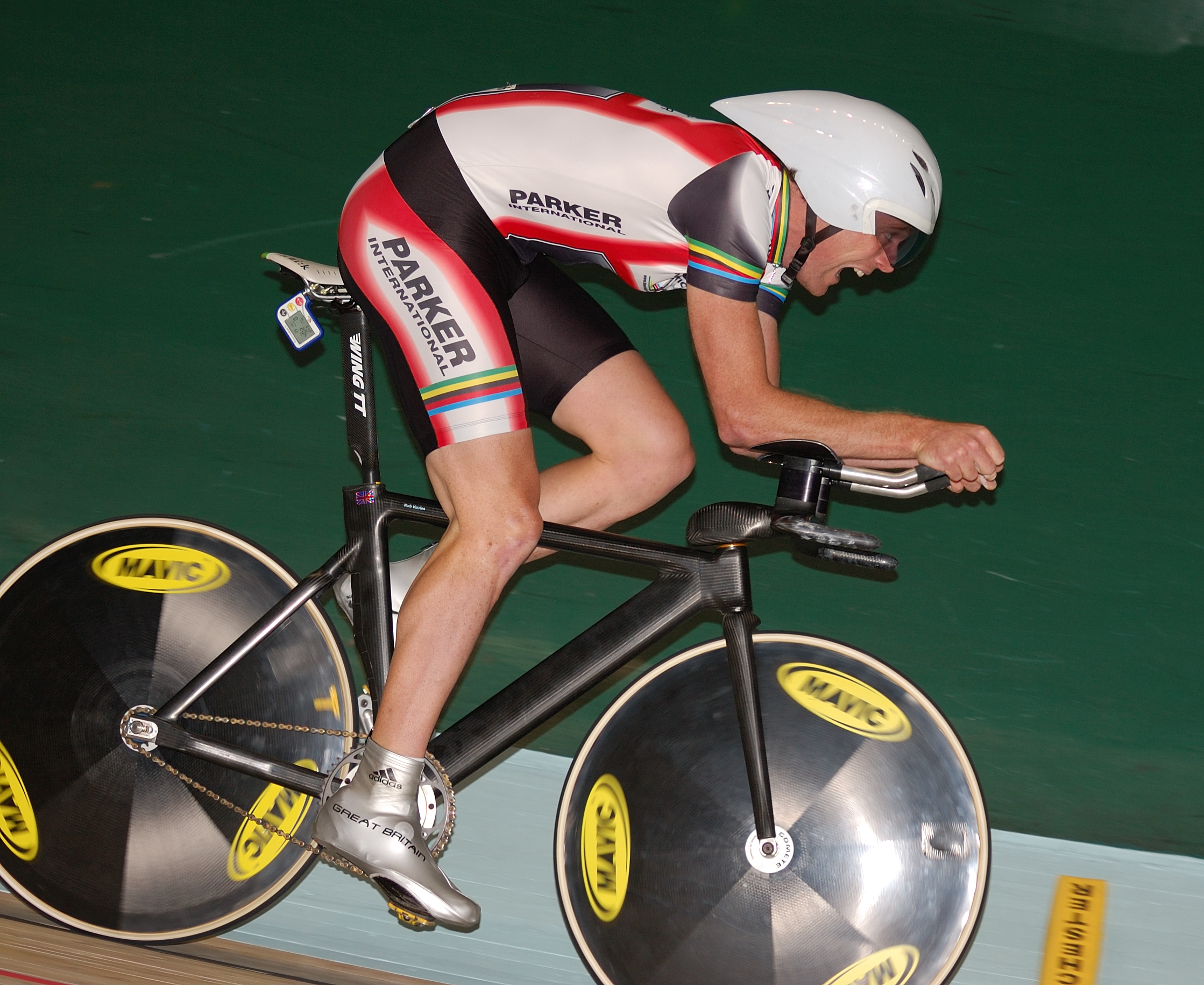
Rob Hayles, four times champion

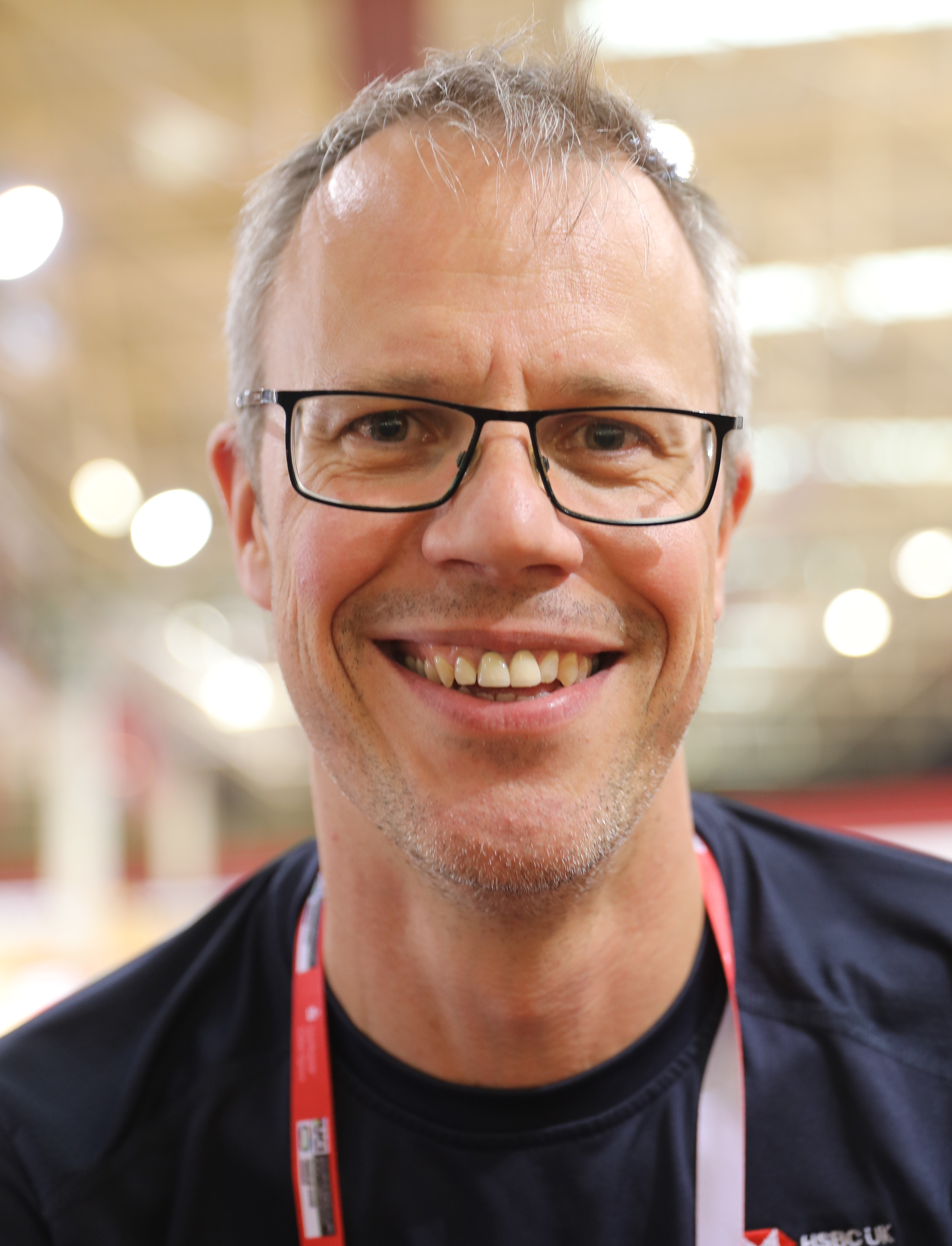
Paul Manning, five times champion

Year	Gold	Silver	Bronze	Ref
1947	Charlie Marriner	George Fleming	Tommy Godwin	
1948	Charlie Marriner & Cyril Cartwright	no second place		
1949	Tommy Godwin	Charlie Marriner	SF- George Fell & Jack Simpson	
1950	Cyril Cartwright	Ken Mitchell	Jack Simpson	
1951	Dave Keeler	Donald Burgess	SF- Don J Smith, Jack Simpson	
1952	Keith Bentley			
1953	Ken Mitchell	Peter Brotherton	SF-Keith Bentley & Ronald Stretton	
1954	Norman Sheil	Peter Brotherton		
1955	Norman Sheil	Dave Bartram	Colin Whittingham	
1956	Mike Gambrill	Tom Simpson	John Geddes	
1957	Mike Gambrill	Norman Sheil	John Geddes	
1958	Tom Simpson	Mike Gambrill	Norman Sheil	
1959	Norman Sheil	Gordon Ian	Barry Hoban	
1960	Barry Hoban	Alf Engers		
1961	Barry Hoban	Harry Jackson	Charlie McCoy	
1962	Harry Jackson	Charlie McCoy	Dave Bonner	
1963	Hugh Porter	Harry Jackson		
1964	Hugh Porter	Derek Harrison		
1965	Hugh Porter			
1966 P	Dave Bonner	Hugh Porter		
1966 A	Graham Webb			
1967 P	Hugh Porter	Dave Bonner		
1967 A	Brendan McKeown			
1968 P	Hugh Porter	Dave Bonner	William Holmes	
1968 A	Brendan McKeown	Ian Hallam	Billy Whiteside	
1969 P	Hugh Porter	Dave Bonner	William Holmes	
1969 A	Ian Hallam	Billy Whiteside		
1970 A	Ian Hallam			
1971 P	Reg Smith	Nigel Dean	Bob Addy	
1971 A	Ian Hallam	Ray Ward	Alan Lloyd	
1972	Ian Hallam	Willi Moore	Mick Bennett	
1973	Ian Hallam	Willi Moore	Mick Bennett	
1974	Ian Hallam	Steve Heffernan	Willi Moore	
1975 P	Phil Bayton			
1976 P	Phil Bayton			
1977 P	Steve Heffernan	Robin Crocker	Mick Bennett	
1977 A	Tony Doyle	Derek Hunt	Ian Banbury	
1978 P	Steve Heffernan	Ian Banbury	Ian Hallam	
1978 A	Tony Doyle	John Patston	Willi Moore	
1979 P	Ian Hallam	Ian Banbury	Steve Heffernan	
1979 A				
1980 P	Tony Doyle	Ian Hallam	Ian Banbury	
1980 A	Sean Yates	Dave Akam	Shaun Wallace	
1981 P	Tony Doyle	Ian Hallam	Ian Banbury	
1981 A	Dave Akam	Shaun Wallace	Steve Denton	
1982 P	Sean Yates	Tony Doyle	Ian Banbury	
1982 A	Shaun Wallace	Tony Mayer	Steve Denton	
1983 P	Sean Yates			
1983 A	Shaun Wallace	Paul Curran		
1984 P				
1984 A	Darryl Webster		Paul Curran	
1985 P	Malcolm Elliott	Ian Banbury	Nigel Dean	
1985 A	Darryl Webster	Adrian Timmis	Rob Muzio	
1986 P	Tony Doyle	Peter Sanders	Ian Fagan	
1986 A	Rob Muzio	Darryl Webster	Glen Sword	
1987 P	Tony Doyle	Sean Yates	Adrian Timmis	
1987 A	Colin Sturgess	Jon Walshaw	Chris Boardman	
1988 P	Tony Doyle	Jon Walshaw	Darryl Webster	
1988 A	Colin Sturgess	Chris Boardman		
1989 P	Colin Sturgess	Paul Curran	Jon Walshaw	
1989 A	Chris Boardman	Bryan Steel	Glen Sword	
1990 P	Colin Sturgess	Gary Coltman	Jon Walshaw	
1990 A	Simon Lillistone	Chris Boardman	Bryan Steel or Matt Illingworth	
1991 P	Colin Sturgess	Jon Walshaw	Gary Coltman	
1991 A	Chris Boardman	Simon Lillistone	Bryan Steel	
1992	Chris Boardman	Bryan Steel	Stuart Shand	
1993	Graeme Obree	Bryan Steel	Stuart Dangerfield	
1994	Graeme Obree	Bryan Steel	Stuart Dangerfield	
1995	Graeme Obree	Bryan Steel	Rob Hayles	
1996	Graeme Obree	Rob Hayles	Shaun Wallace	
1997	Rob Hayles	Bryan Steel	Jon Clay	
1998	Rob Hayles	Matt Illingworth	Jon Clay	
1999	Rob Hayles	Matt Illingworth	Bradley Wiggins	
2000	Rob Hayles	Paul Manning	Bradley Wiggins	
2001	Paul Manning	Rob Hayles	Chris Newton	
2002	Michael Hutchinson	Kristian House	Ben Hallam	
2003	Paul Manning	Bryan Steel	Rob Hayles	
2004	Paul Manning	Rob Hayles	Kristian House	
2005	Paul Manning	Rob Hayles	Michael Hutchinson	
2006	David Millar	Paul Manning	Chris Newton	
2007	Paul Manning	Ed Clancy	Jonathan Bellis	
2008	Steven Burke	Rob Hayles	Michael Hutchinson	
2009	Geraint Thomas	Andy Tennant	Ben Swift	
2010	Peter Kennaugh	George Atkins	Sam Harrison	
2011	Steven Burke	Sam Harrison	Jon Dibben	
2012	Owain Doull	Jon Dibben	Douglas Dewey	
2013	Edward Clancy	Steven Burke	Joe Kelly	
2014	Andrew Tennant	Steven Burke	Jon Dibben	
2015	Andrew Tennant	Germain Burton	Jon Dibben	
2017	Daniel Bigham	Charlie Tanfield	Ethan Hayter	
2018	Charlie Tanfield	Daniel Bigham	John Archibald	
2019	John Archibald	Daniel Bigham	Kyle Gordon	
2020	John Archibald	Jonathan Wale	Daniel Bigham	
2021 not held due to COVID-19
2022	Daniel Bigham	Charlie Tanfield	Kyle Gordon	
2023	Charlie Tanfield	Michael Gill	William Roberts	
2024	Michael Gill	William Roberts	Matthew Brennan	
2025	Josh Charlton	Michael Gill	William Perrett	
2026	Charlie Tanfield	Josh Charlton	Leon Atkins	

A = Amateur / P = Professional

=== Women's 3,000 metres Senior Race (1960–2024) ===
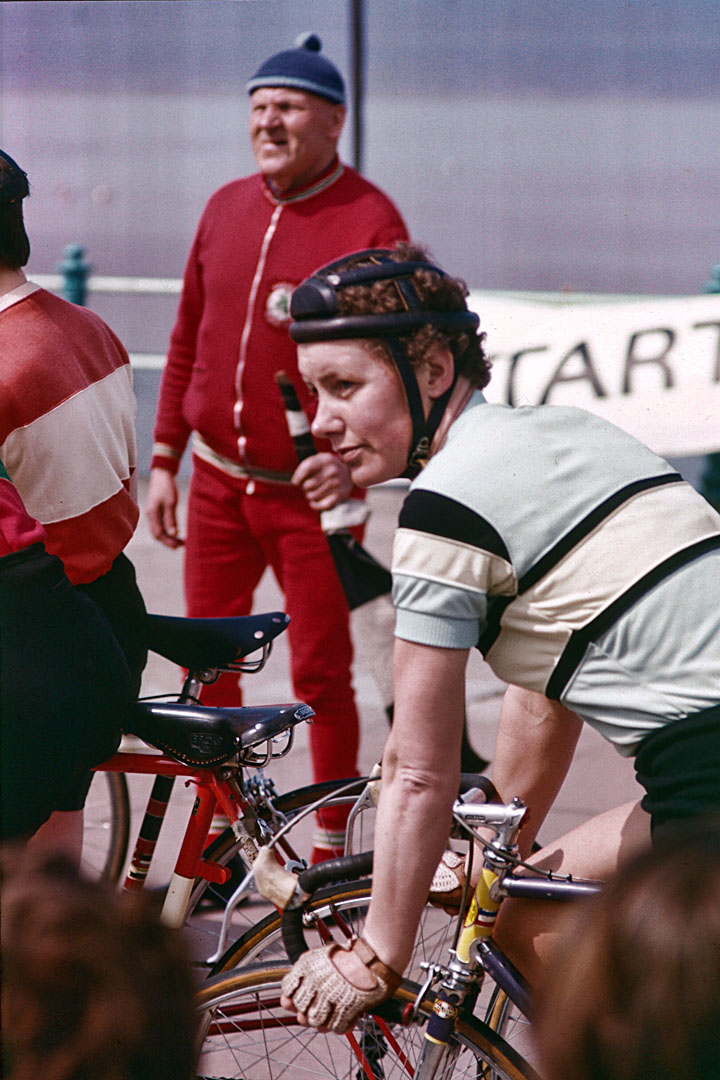
Beryl Burton

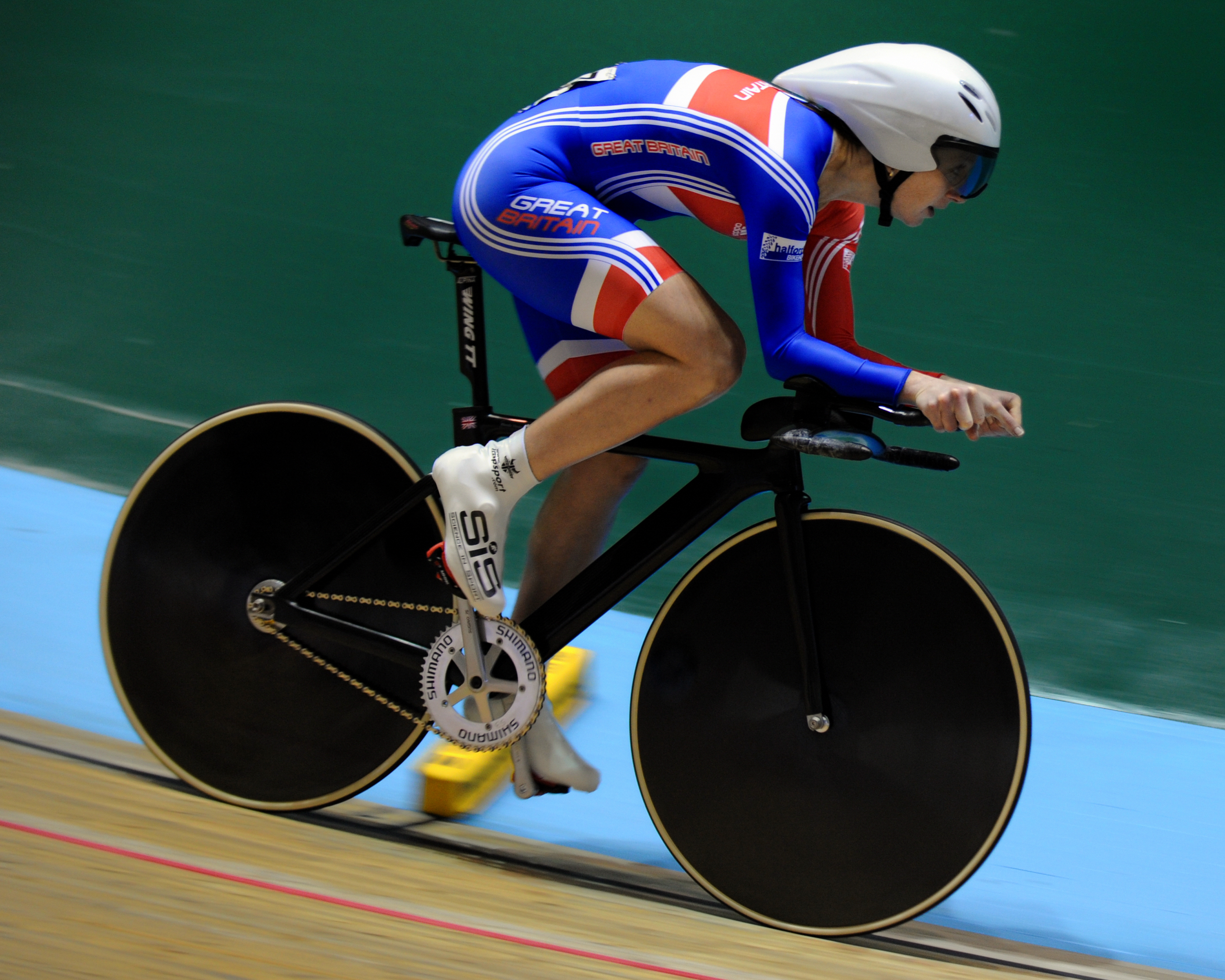
Wendy Houvenaghel

Year	Gold	Silver	Bronze	Ref
1960	Beryl Burton			
1961	Beryl Burton			
1962				
1963	Beryl Burton			
1964	Beryl Burton	Shirley Killingbeck		
1965	Beryl Burton			
1966	Beryl Burton			
1967	Beryl Burton			
1968	Beryl Burton			
1969	Carol Barton			
1970	Beryl Burton			
1971	Beryl Burton	Bernadette Swinnerton	Maggie Gordon-Smith	
1972	Beryl Burton	Carol Barton	Maggie Gordon-Smith	
1973	Beryl Burton	Carol Barton	Maggie Gordon-Smith	
1974	Beryl Burton	Carol Barton	Maggie Gordon-Smith	
1975	Denise Burton	Maggie Gordon-Smith	Carol Barton	
1976				
1977	Maggie Thompson	Denise Burton	Beryl Burton	
1978	Maggie Thompson	Brenda Atkinson	Denise Burton	
1979	Brenda Atkinson	Anne Collingwood	Catherine Swinnerton	
1980	Mandy Jones	Pauline Cave	Catherine Swinnerton	
1981	Mandy Jones	Catherine Swinnerton	Pauline Strong	
1982	Mandy Jones	Catherine Swinnerton	Barbara Collins or Pauline Strong	
1983				
1984				
1985	Theresa Dark	Maria Blower	Judith Painter	
1986	Theresa Dark	Lisa Brambani		
1987	Sally Hodge	Lisa Brambani	Barbara Collins	
1988	Sally Hodge	Carole Langley	Elaine Ward or Sarah Springman	
1989	Sally McKenzie-Hodge	Maxine Johnson	Sally Dawes	
1990	Sally Dawes	Maxine Johnson	Sue Wright	
1991	Sally Dawes	Louise Jones	Mandy Jones	
1992	Sally Dawes	Louise Jones	Rachelle Jones	
1993	Sally Timmis	Sarah Phillips	Maxine Johnson	
1994	Yvonne McGregor	Sally Dawes	Maxine Johnson	
1995	Yvonne McGregor	Maxine Johnson	Vikki Filsell	
1996	Yvonne McGregor	Maxine Johnson	Vikki Filsell	
1997	Yvonne McGregor	Sally Boyden	Vikki Filsell or Michelle Ward	
1998	Yvonne McGregor	Michelle Ward	Emma Davies	
1999	Yvonne McGregor	Emma Davies	Sally Boyden	
2000	Yvonne McGregor	Emma Davies	Frances Newstead	
2001	Emma Davies	Yvonne McGregor	Sara Symington	
2002	Emma Davies	Angela Hunter	Emily Forde	
2003	Emma Davies	Frances Newstead	Rachel Heal	
2004	Emma Davies	Katrina Hair	Lorna Webb	
2005	Wendy Houvenaghel	Rachel Heal	Katrina Hair	
2006	Rebecca Romero	Nikki Harris	Sarah Bailey	
2007	Wendy Houvenaghel	Rebecca Romero	Joanna Rowsell	
2008	Sarah Storey	Emma Trott	Lynn Hamel	
2009	Sarah Storey	Hannah Mayho	Dani King	
2010	Wendy Houvenaghel	Sarah Storey	Laura Trott	
2011	Joanna Rowsell	Laura Trott	Wendy Houvenaghel	
2012	Lucy Garner	Charline Joiner	Hannah Barnes	
2013	Laura Trott	Dani King	Katie Archibald	
2014	Katie Archibald	Laura Trott	Joanna Rowsell	
2015	Laura Trott	Katie Archibald	Joanna Rowsell Shand	
2017	Katie Archibald	Emily Nelson	Neah Evans	
2018	Katie Archibald	Emily Nelson	Emily Kay	
2019	Katie Archibald	Neah Evans	Eleanor Dickinson	
2020	Josie Knight	Anna Morris	Megan Barker	
2021 not held due to COVID-19
2022	Neah Evans	Anna Morris	Kate Richardson	
2023	Neah Evans	Ella Barnwell	Francesca Hall	
2024	Kate Richardson	Frankie Hall	Izzy Sharp	

=== Women's 4,000 metres Senior Race (2025–) ===
Year	Gold	Silver	Bronze	Ref
2025	Anna Morris	Izzy Sharp	Grace Lister	
2026	Josie Knight	Anna Morris	Erin Boothman	

== Junior ==
Extended content

Men's Junior Race

Year	Gold	Silver	Bronze
3 km Pursuit
1972	Stuart Morris		
1977	Dave Akam	Shaun Fenwick	Ian Fagan
1978	Tony Mayer	Paul Curran	Gordon Wooldridge
1987	Christopher Roberts	Ian Donohue	Roger Ward
1989	Simon Lillistone	Bryan Steel	Mark Dawes
1993	Richard Prince	Andrew Russell	Andrew Mummery
1994	David George	Andrew Mummery	Lee Garner
1998	Bradley Wiggins	Mark Kelly	S. Collins
1999	Ben Hallam	Rhys Gruffydd	C Sellen
2000	Kieran Page	Ben Hallam	C Sellen
2001	Kieran Page	Russell Anderson	Adam Duggleby
2003	Ed Clancy	Geraint Thomas	Matt Brammier
2004	Ross Sander	Ian Stannard	Tom Smith
2005	Andy Tennant	Ian Stannard	Ben Swift
2006	Peter Kennaugh	David Daniell	Christian Lyte
2007	Steven Burke	Jonathan Bellis	Peter Kennaugh
2008	Mark Christian	Andrew Fenn	Erick Rowsell
2009	George Atkins	Tim Kennaugh	Daniel McLay
2010	Sam Harrison	Dan Mclay	Owain Doull
2011	Jon Dibben	Owain Doull	Robert Lambton
2012	Christopher Latham	Jacob Ragan	Kristian Woolf
2013	Matthew Gibson	Tao Geoghegan Hart	Jacob Ragan
2014	Matthew Gibson	Joe Holt	Matthew Bostock
2015	Ethan Hayter	Reece Wood	Angus Claxton
2016	Ethan Hayter	Reece Wood	Rhys Britton
2017	Ethan Vernon	Fred Wright	Rhys Britton

Women's Junior Race

Year	Gold	Silver	Bronze
Pursuit
2002	Kimberley Walsh	Jane Leask	Amy Hunt
2003	Nikki Harris	Amy Hunt	Cayley Ennett
2004	Amy Hunt	Jo Tindley	Kimberley Blythe
2005	Joanna Rowsell	Jo Tindley	Lara Wann
2006	Joanna Rowsell	Elizabeth Armitstead	Hannah Mayho
2007	Hannah Mayho	Lucy Martin	Emma Trott
2008	Hannah Mayho	Katie Colclough	Alex Greenfield
2009	Laura Trott	Ella Sadler-Andrews	Jessica Booth
2010	Laura Trott	Hannah Barnes	Hannah Walker
2011	Elinor Barker	Lucy Garner	Hannah Barnes
2012	Katie Archibald	Lucy Garner	Emily Kay
2013	Emily Kay	Hayley Jones	Emily Nelson
2014	Grace Garner	Manon Lloyd	Melissa Lowther
2015	Grace Garner	Abbie Dentus	Ellie Dickinson
2016	Ellie Dickinson	Becky Raybould	Jessica Roberts
2017	Emily Tillett	Ellie Russell	Lauren Dolan

== Youth ==
Extended content

Male Youth Race

Year	Gold	Silver	Bronze
2 km pursuit
1977	Paul Wright		
1991	Andrew Mummery	Geraint Day	
1993	Paul Sheppard		
1995	Sion Jones	Stephen MacMillan	
1997	David Heaven	Scott Burns	Rhys Gruffydd
1998	Kris Story	Richard Sutcliffe	George Holland
1999	Richard Sutcliffe	Steve Harrison	James Cartwright
2000	Matthew Haynes	Adam Duggleby	Tom White
2001	Geraint Thomas	Bruce Edgar	Jonathon Fletcher
2003	Tom Smith	Shane Charlton	Richard Hepworth
2004	Steven Burke	Shane Charlton	Andrew Fenn
2005	Adam Blythe	Peter Kennaugh	Mark McNally
2006	Andrew Fenn	Benjamin Plain	Mark Christian
2007	Samuel Harrison	Daniel McLay	George Atkins
2008	Samuel Harrison	Jamie Rogers	Felix English
2009	Jon Dibben	Robert Lambton	Owain Doull
2010	Jon Dibben	Sam Lowe	Jacob Ragan
2011	Chris Lawless	Oliver Wood	Tao Geoghegan Hart
2012	Charlie Tanfield	Joe Evans	Matthew Gibson
2013	Joe Holt	Matthew Bostock	Joseph Fry
2014	Fred Wright	Ethan Hayter	Rhys Britton
2015	Rhys Britton	Fred Wright	Jake Stewart
2016	Matthew Burke	Charlie Calvert	Ethan Vernon
2017	Lewis Askey	Zach Bridges	Samuel Watson

Female Youth Race

Year	Gold	Silver	Bronze
2 km pursuit
1998	Nicole Cooke	Claire Dixon	Danielle Andrew
1999	Nicole Cooke	Claire Dixon	Laura Bissell
2000	Kimberley Walsh	Nicki Lloyd	Kirsteen Lawrie
2001	Katherine Hill	Rachel Ball	Nicki Lloyd
2002	Susy Massey	Rachel Ball	Kim Blythe
2003	Jo Tindley	Kimberley Blythe	Jenny Middlehurst
2004	Anna Blyth	Lucy Richards	Jenny Middlehurst
2005	Lara Wann	Greta Junker	Lucy Richards
2006	Hannah Mayho	Danielle King	Greta Junker
2007	Jessica Booth	Corrine Hall	Ella Sadler-Andrews
2008	Lucy Garner	Ruby Miller	Hannah Barnes
2009	Emily Kay	Hannah Barnes	Lucy Garner
2010	Emily Kay	Elinor Barker	Amy Roberts
2011	Emily Kay	Amy Hill	Emily Nelson
2012	Grace Garner	Emily Nelson	Melissa Lowther
2013	Charlotte Broughton	Lucy Shaw	Abigail Dentus
2014	Charlotte Broughton	Jessica Roberts	Eleanor Dickinson
2015	Jessica Roberts	Emily Tillett	Rachel Jary
2016	Elynor Bäckstedt	Ellie Russell	Pfeiffer Georgi
2017	Elynor Bäckstedt	Ella Barnwell	Zoë Bäckstedt
