= 2026 British Cycling National Track Championships =

British cycling event

- Venue: Manchester
- Date: 20–22 February 2026
- Velodrome: Manchester Velodrome

The 2026 British Cycling National Track Championships sponsored by Lloyds Bank as naming partner, are the 2026 edition of the British Cycling National Track Championships, the annual national championships in track cycling for Great Britain.

They are organised and sanctioned by the national governing body, British Cycling, and were open to British cyclists. Although Cycling in Northern Ireland is administered by the all-island body Cycling Ireland, Northern Irish cyclists are also eligible to compete in the British championships.

The National Track Championships (excluding certain events) were held from 20 to 22 February 2026 at the Manchester Velodrome (part of the National Cycling Centre) in Manchester and included a full integrated program of para-cycing events, including visually impaired tandem. As in previous years, the Derny, Omnium, Madison, and able-bodied Tandem events take place at various other venues and dates throughout the year, while the Elimination race previously held separately now forms part of the main championships.

Winners of each event are awarded the national champions jersey - a white jersey featuring a blue, white and red band across the midriff - which may be worn throughout the following year when competing in the same discipline.

== Medal summary ==
=== Elite events ===
==== Men ====
Event	Gold	Silver	Bronze	Ref
Sprint	Matt Richardson	Harry Ledingham-Horn	Oliver Pettifer	
Keirin	Matt Richardson	Hamish Turnball	William Munday	
Team sprint	Team Inspired A Marcus Hiley; Harry Radford; Matt Richardson	Team Inspired B Ed Lowe; Hayden Norris; Hamish Turnball	Team Inspired C Lyall Craig; Archie Gill; Joseph Truman; Oliver Pettifer	
Individual pursuit	Charlie Tanfield	Josh Charlton	Leon Atkins	
Points	Ben Marsh	Charlie Tanfield	Ben Wiggins	
Scratch	Matthew Bostock	William Roberts	Oliver Wood	
Elimination	Matthew Bostock	William Tidball	Charlie Tanfield	

Event	Venue & date	Gold	Silver	Bronze	Ref
Derny	Welwyn Garden City – 21 Jun 2026	Frank Longstaff	Matthew Gittings	James Ambrose-Parish	
Madison					
Omnium					
Team pursuit					

==== Women ====
Event	Gold	Silver	Bronze	Ref
Sprint	Emma Finucane	Iona Moir	Rhian Edmunds	
Keirin	Emma Finucane	Lowri Thomas	Lauren Bell	
Team sprint	Team Inspired A Lowri Thomas; Rhianna Parris-Smith; Emma Finucane; Lauren Bell	Team Inspired B Rhian Edmunds; Iona Moir; Georgette Rand	Glasgow Track Racing; Madeleine Silcock; Ellie Stone; Sylvia Mizstal; Sarah Johnson	
Individual pursuit	Josie Knight	Anna Morris	Erin Boothman	
Points	Anna Morris	Josie Knight	Katie Archibald	
Scratch	Anna Morris	Jenny Holl	Phoebe Taylor	
Elimination	Erin Boothman	Anna Morris	Katie Archibald	

Event	Venue & date	Gold	Silver	Bronze	Ref
Derny	Welwyn Garden City – 21 Jun 2026	Jessica Disley	Danielle Watkinson	Miriam Jessett	
Madison					
Omnium					
Team pursuit					

==== Open ====
Event	Venue & date	Gold	Silver	Bronze	Ref
Tandem					

=== Para-cycling events ===
==== Men ====
Event	Class	Gold	Silver	Bronze
1km time trial	C1-3	Finlay Graham (C3)	Matthew Robertson	Callum Deboys
Individual pursuit	B	Morgan Fice-Noyes; Chris Latham (p)	Chris McDonald; John Archibald (p)	Christopher Wilkins; Adam Duggleby (p)
Sprint	B	Frederick Ireland; Aaron Pope	Tim Caldwell; Benedict Elliot	Josh Matten; Snowden Brierley
Scratch	C	Archie Atkinson (C4)	William Bjergfelt (C5)	Finlay Graham (C3)
Elimination	C4-5	Archie Atkinson (C4)	Finlay Graham (C3)	William Bjergfelt (C5)

==== Women ====
Event	Class	Gold	Silver	Bronze
1km time trial	C1–3	Elisabeth Simpson (C2)	Amelia Cass (C2)	Emma Warner (C2)
1km time trial	C4–5	Kadeena Cox	Crystal Lane-Wright (C5)	Rebecca Newark (C5)
Individual pursuit	B	Sophie Unwin; Jenny Holl (p)	Georgina Bullen; Miriam Jessett (p)	Amelia Robertson Rebecca Richards (p)
Sprint	B	Sophie Unwin; Jenny Holl (p)	Georgina Bullen; Miriam Jessett (p)	Selvi Krishna; Eva Hauge (p)
Scratch race	C	Crystal Lane-Wright (C5)	Rebecca Newark (C5)	Morgan Newberry (C5)
Elimination race	C	Crystal Lane-Wright (C5)	Morgan Newberry (C5)	Elsie Hughes (C5)

==== Mixed ====
Event	Class	Gold	Silver	Bronze
Mixed Team Sprint	B	Jean-Claude Tan Damme - JTC; James Ball; Matt Rotherham (p); Sophie Unwin; Jenny Holl (p)	Fred Said Go - FSG; Georgina Bullen; Miriam Jessett (p); Frederik Ireland; Jack Pearson (p)	—
Mixed Team Sprint	C	Jody Cundy; Rebecca Newark; Jacob Smith	Archie Atkinson; Crystal Lane-Wright; Matthew Robertson	Callum Deboys; Elisabeth Simpson; Christopher Scott
