= 2025 British Cycling National Track Championships =

British cycling event

- Venue: Manchester
- Date: 21–23 February 2025
- Velodrome: Manchester Velodrome

The 2025 British Cycling National Track Championships sponsored by Lloyds Bank as naming partner, were the 2025 edition of the British Cycling National Track Championships, the annual national championships in track cycling for Great Britain and Northern Ireland. They are organised and sanctioned by the national governing body, British Cycling, and were open to British cyclists.

The National Track Championships (excluding certain events) were held from 21 to 23 February 2025 at the Manchester Velodrome (part of the National Cycling Centre) in Manchester and included a full integrated program of para-cycing events. A new British Cycling schedule resulted in the Time Trial being deferred until January 2026 in Glasgow and the Team Purusit being switched to the Geraint Thomas National Velodrome on 16 November. As in previous years, the Derny, Omnium, Madison, Tandem and Elimination events take place at various other venues and dates throughout the year.

Winners of each event are awarded the national champions jersey - a white jersey featuring a blue, white and red band across the midriff - which may be worn throughout the following year when competing in the same discipline.

The event was notable for the debut at the British National championships of Olympic medalist and World champion Matthew Richardson, racing for medals for the first time since his controversial transfer of allegiance from Australia to Great Britain, leaving the event with all three sprint race gold medals.

== Medal summary ==
=== Elite events ===
==== Men ====
Event	Gold	Silver	Bronze	Ref
Sprint	Matthew Richardson	Peter Mitchell	Marcus Hiley	
Keirin	Matthew Richardson	Peter Mitchell	Hamish Turnbull	
Team sprint	Team Inspired/GTRC; Lyall Craig; Harry Ledingham-Horn; Niall Monks; Matthew Richardson	Team Inspired B Marcus Hiley; Ed Lowe; Oliver Pettifer	Team Inspired A Alistair Fielding; Hayden Norris; Harry Radford; Hamish Turnbull	
Individual pursuit	Josh Charlton	Michael Gill	William Perrett	
Points	William Perrett	Henry Hobbs	Ben Wiggins	
Scratch	Noah Hobbs	Sam Fisher	William Gilbank	

Event	Venue & date	Gold	Silver	Bronze	Ref
Derny	Lee Valley, 1 Nov	William Perrett	Dylan Belton Owen	Luke Meyer-Eland	
Elimination Race	Derby, 19 Oct	James Ambrose-Parish	Ryan Oldfield	Frank Longstaff	
Madison	Manchester, 20 Dec	Logan Maclean; William Perrett	Elliott Rowe; Oliver Wood	Henry Hobbs; Ben Wiggins	
Omnium	Manchester, 21 Dec	Ben Swift	Mark Stewart	Lewis Askey	
Team pursuit	Newport, 16 Nov	Team Wales; Rory Gravelle; William Roberts; Rhys Britton; Will Salter; Sam Fisher	University of Derby Cycling Club; Philip Campbell; Peter Ferguson; Ben Marsh; Rhys Thomas	Not awarded	

==== Women ====
Event	Gold	Silver	Bronze	Ref
Sprint	Lauren Bell	Rhian Edmunds	Georgette Rand	
Keirin	Lauren Bell	Emma Finucane	Rhian Edmunds	
Team sprint	Team Inspired A Lauren Bell; Rhian Edmunds; Lowri Thomas	Team Inspired B Iona Moir; Rhianna Parris-Smith; Georgette Rand	Team Wales; Amy Cole; Bronwen Howard-Rees; Eve James; Evelyn Tedaldi	
Individual pursuit	Anna Morris	Izzy Sharp	Grace Lister	
Points	Katie Archibald	Dannielle Watkinson	Cat Ferguson	
Scratch	Anna Morris	Katie Archibald	Erin Boothman	

Event	Venue & date	Gold	Silver	Bronze	Ref
Derny	Lee Valley, 1 Nov	Danielle Watkinson	Miriam Jessett	Mathilde Pauls	
Elimination Race	Derby, 19 Oct	Phoebe Taylor	Lucy Nelson	Mari Porton	
Madison	Manchester, 21 Dec	Erin Boothman; Anna Morris	Katie Archibald; Maddie Leech	Millie Couzens; Sophie Lewis	
Omnium	Manchester, 20 Dec	Anna Morris	Katie Archibald	Jessica Roberts	
Team pursuit	Newport, 16 Nov	Team Wales; Aelwen Davies; Anna Lloyd; Ciara Oliva; Mabli Phillips; Seren Thomas	Team Jadan; Katie-Anne Calton; Charlotte Hodgkins-Byrne; Mathilde Pauls; Dannielle Watkinson	The Muppet Show; Melanie Dobbins; Alison Fovargue; Madeline Moore; Melanie Sneddon	

==== Open ====
Event	Venue & date	Gold	Silver	Bronze	Ref
Tandem	Newcastle-under-Lyme, 15 Jun	Josh Dunham; Callum Deboys	Peter Boyd; Thomas Boyd	Benedict Elliott; Tim Caldwell	

=== Para-cycling events ===
==== Men ====
Event	Class	Gold	Silver	Bronze	Ref
1km time trial	C2	Matthew Robertson	Callum Deboys	Ben Wood	
1km time trial	C3	Jacob Smith	Ben Hetherington	Charlie Stanton-Stock	
1km time trial	C4	Archie Atkinson	Jody Cundy	Josh Betteley	
1km time trial	C5	Alex Jones	Xavier Disley	Samuel Davies	
1km time trial	B	James Ball; Pilot: Steffan Lloyd	Mason Bradley; Pilot: Jack Pearson	Frederick Ireland; Pilot: Tom Cullen	
Individual pursuit	C2	Matthew Robertson	Callum Deboys	Ben Wood	
Individual pursuit	C3	Finlay Graham	Jacob Smith	Charlie Stanton-Stock	
Individual pursuit	C4	Archie Atkinson	Nicholas Fairfield	Josh Betteley	
Individual pursuit	C5	Xavier Disley	William Bjergfelt	Samuel Davies	
Individual pursuit	B	Steve Bate; Pilot: Christopher Latham	Chris Wilkins; Pilot: Henry Latimer	Frederick Ireland; Pilot: Tom Cullen	

==== Women ====
Event	Class	Gold	Silver	Bronze	Ref
1km time trial	C1–5	Elisabeth Simpson (C2)	Elsie Hughes (C5)	Katie Toft (C1)	
1km time trial	B	Sophie Unwin; Pilot: Jenny Holl	Amelia Robertson; Pilot: Corrine Hall	Lora Fachie; Pilot: Charlotte Deykin	
Individual pursuit	C1–3	Amelia Cass (C2)	Katie Toft (C1)	Elisabeth Simpson (C2)	
Individual pursuit	C5	Morgan Newberry	Rebecca Newark	Elsie Hughes	
Individual pursuit	B	Sophie Unwin; Pilot: Jenny Holl	Lora Fachie; Pilot: Charlotte Deykin	Selvi Krishna; Pilot: Eva Hauge	

==== Mixed ====
The mixed team sprint C is a National Championship event, and its winners are therefore National Champions. However, the mixed team sprint B was a test event and a non-Championship event.

Event	Class	Gold	Silver	Bronze	Ref
Mixed team sprint	C	Samuel Davies (C5); Rebecca Newark (C5); Jacob Smith (C3)	Archie Atkinson (C4); Morgan Newberry (C5); Matthew Robertson (C2)	William Bjergfelt (C5); Callum Deboys (C2); Elisabeth Simpson (C2)	
Mixed team sprint	B	James Ball (pilot: Steffan Lloyd) & Sophie Unwin (pilot: Jenny Holl)	Lora Fachie (pilot: Charlotte Deykin) & Neil Fachie (pilot: Matt Rotherham)	Georgina Bullen (pilot: Eva Taylor) & Mason Bradley (pilot: Jack Pearson)	
