= British National Elimination Championships =

British cycling national competition

The British National Elimination Championships are held annually as part of the British National Track Championships organised by British Cycling.

== Past winners ==
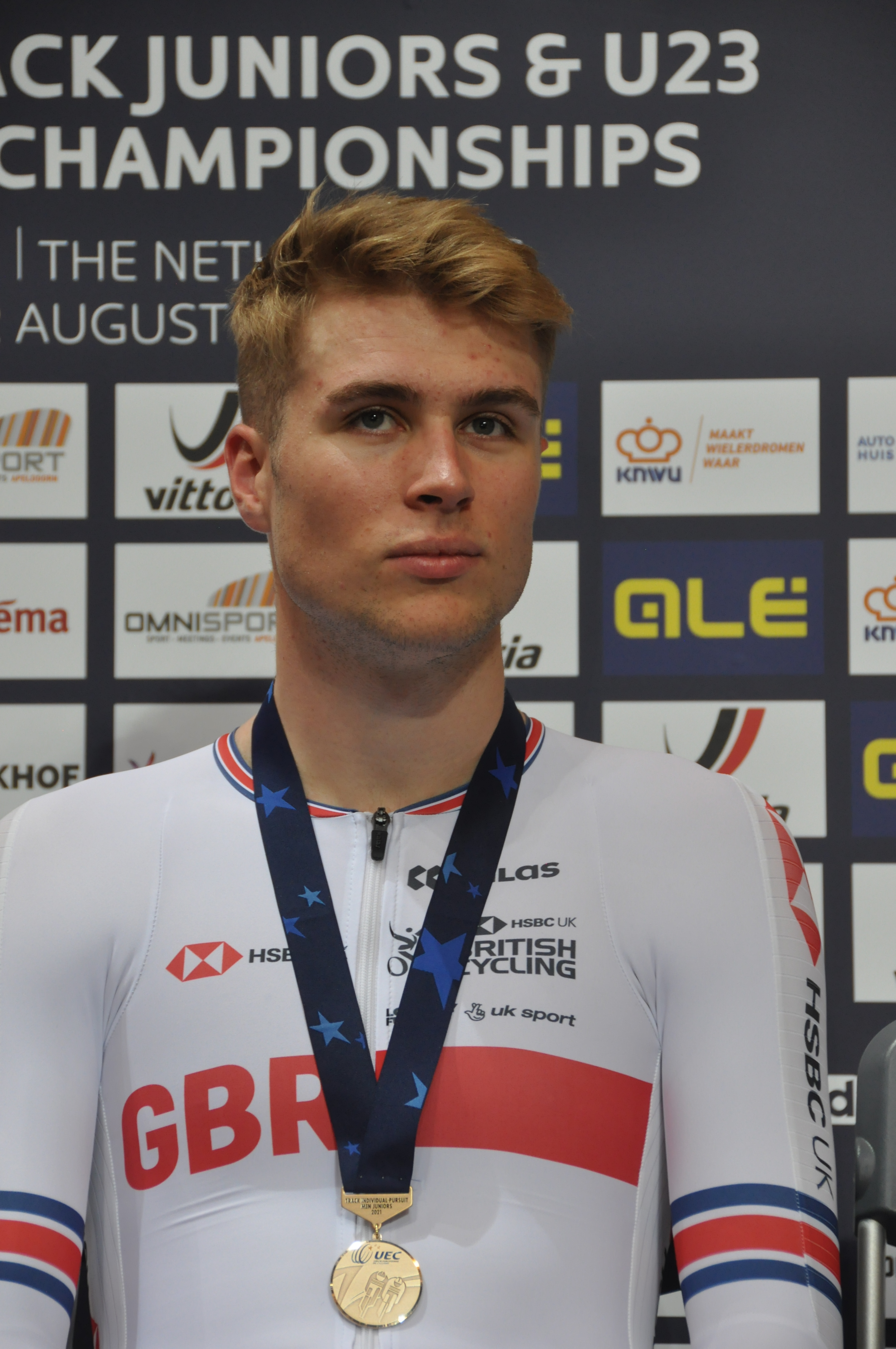
Josh Charlton

=== Men ===
Year	Gold	Silver	Bronze	Ref
2022	Josh Charlton	William Roberts	Andrew Brinkley	
2023	Matt Rotherham	Tom Ward	David Brearley	
2024				
2025	James Ambrose-Parish	Ryan Oldfield	Frank Longstaff	
2026	Matthew Bostock	William Tidball	Charlie Tanfield	

=== Women ===
Year	Gold	Silver	Bronze	Ref
2025	Phoebe Taylor	Lucy Nelson	Mari Porton	
2026	Erin Boothman	Anna Morris	Katie Archibald	
