= Kate Richardson (cyclist) =

British cyclist (born 2002)

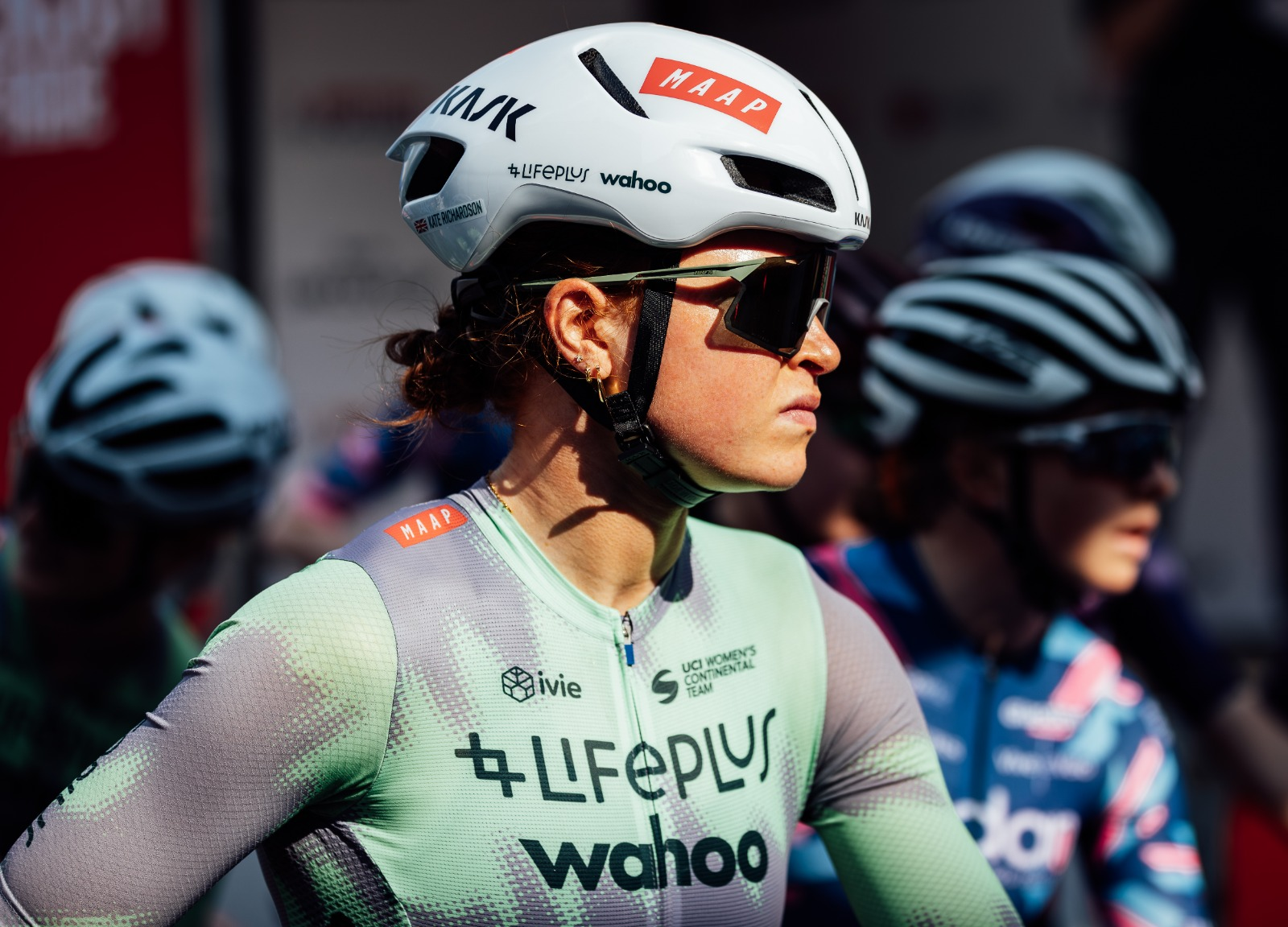
- Richardson in 2024

Personal information
- Born: 12 September 2002 (age 24) Glasgow, Scotland

Cycling career
- Sport: Cycling
- Current team: Team Inspired/Handsling Alba DRT (track); Handsling Alba DRT (road)
- Disciplines: Track; Road
- Role: Rider
- Rider type: Endurance (track)

Amateur team
- 2022: Alba Development RT

Professional teams
- 2023–2024: Lifeplus Wahoo
- 2025–: Handsling Alba DRT
Medal record
Women's track cycling
Representing Great Britain
European Championships
Gold medal – first place	2026 Konya	Team pursuit
European Under-23 Championships
Gold medal – first place	2023 Anadia	Individual pursuit
Gold medal – first place	2023 Anadia	Team pursuit
Silver medal – second place	2022 Anadia	Team pursuit
British Cycling National Track Championships
Gold medal – first place	2024 Manchester	Individual pursuit
Gold medal – first place	2024 Manchester	Team pursuit
Silver medal – second place	2024 Manchester	Points race
Bronze medal – third place	2022 Newport	Individual pursuit

Kate Richardson (born 12 September 2002) is a Scottish and British road and track cyclist.

== Career ==
A talented youth and junior athlete, Richardson won multiple national titles in her native Scotland in triathlon, athletics and cycling.

She switched from triathlon in 2021 joining cycling road racing team Alba DRT. She won the 2022 Ras na mBan road stage race in Ireland, and double gold at the 2023 U23 & Junior European Championships (individual pursuit and team pursuit) in Anadia, Portugal.

At the 2024 British Cycling National Track Championships she won her first two national titles, winning the Individual Pursuit and the Team Pursuit.

On 12 May 2024, eight weeks after breaking a collarbone and fracturing her scapula in a crash at Drenthe, The Netherlands, Richardson returned to racing, winning the Rapha Lincoln Grand Prix by attacking on the penultimate climb of Michaelgate to break clear of the leading group and ride solo to the line.

On 5 June 2024, she was forced to pull out of the Tour of Britain Women after fracturing her scapula for a second time and sustaining a concussion when she was hit by the driver of a 4x4 during a training ride.

In December 2024, it was announced that Richardson had signed a road contract with the Swiss owned, British registered UCI Continental Hess Cycling Team. The same month, following a 6 month injury induced lay off, she returned to competition in the Scottish National Track Championships at The Sir Chris Hoy Velodrome in Glasgow, winning three Gold Medals in the Individual Pursuit, The Scratch Race and The Points Race.

In late March 2025, UK cycling media announced that Richardson had terminated her contract with Hess Cycling Team due to continual contractual breaches by the team and had resigned with Handsling Alba DRT, where she started her career in 2022. She returned to road racing in April 2025 and following a number of strong performances domestically and in Belgium took her maiden UCI General Classification win at the Tour de Feminin in Czechia on 18 May 2025.

On 27 June 2025, at the British National Road Race Championships, held in Ceredigion, Wales, Richardson won the Circuit Race to take her first national title on the road.

== Major results ==
2026
UEC European Track Championships

1st : Team pursuit

2025
British National Circuit Race Championships

1st

Tour de Feminin

1st General Classification

Scottish National Track Championships

1st Individual Pursuit

2024
National Track Championships

1st Individual pursuit
1st Team pursuit
2nd Points Race

1st Rapha Lincoln Grand Prix

Scottish National Track Championships

1st Individual Pursuit
1st Scratch Race
1st Points Race

2023
U23 & Junior European Championships

1st : Individual pursuit
1st : Team pursuit

2022

1st Scottish National Criterium Championship
1st :Rás na mBan

1st GC I 1st Points I 1st QoM I 1st Young Rider

Scottish National Track Championships

1st Women's 10km Scratch Race
1st Women's 25km Points Race

U23 & Junior European Championships

2nd Team pursuit

National Track Championships

3rd Individual pursuit
