= List of Portuguese records in track cycling =

The following are the national records in track cycling in Portugal maintained by the Federação Portuguesa de Ciclismo.

== Men ==
Event	Record	Athlete	Date	Meet	Place	Ref
Flying 200 m time trial						
250 m time trial (standing start)	19.415	Ivo Oliveira	19 October 2016	European Championships	Saint-Quentin-en-Yvelines, France	
Team sprint						
1 km time trial						
1 km time trial (sea level)	1:02.720	Ivo Oliveira	19 October 2016	European Championships	Saint-Quentin-en-Yvelines, France	
4000m individual pursuit	4:03.631	Ivo Oliveira	15 February 2025	European Championships	Heusden-Zolder, Belgium	
4000m team pursuit						

== Women ==
Event	Record	Athlete	Date	Meet	Place	Ref
Flying 200 m time trial						
500 m time trial						
3000m individual pursuit						
3000m team pursuit						
