= Billy Whiteside =

British cyclist

Personal information
- Nationality: British (English)
- Born: 1944 Bootle, England

Sport
- Sport: Cycling
- Event(s): time trial, pursuit
- Club: Kirkby CC

William "Billy" Whiteside (born 1944), is a former cyclist who competed for England.

== Biography ==
Whiteside rode for the Kirkby Cycling Club and was the Merseyside 10 miles champion.

Whiteside represented the England team at the 1966 British Empire and Commonwealth Games in Kingston, Jamaica, in the time trial event.

At the 1968 British National Individual Pursuit Championships, he finished third behind Brendan McKeown and the following year at the 1969 Championships, he finished runner-up behind Ian Hallam.
