= Richard Freeman (physician) =

British sports physician and doctor

Richard Freeman (born 1959 or 1960) is a former sports physician known for his work with British Cycling and Team Sky.

In a medical tribunal in Manchester, Freeman was accused of aiding cyclists with doping and related misconduct. He admitted to 18 of 22 charges against him. In March 2021, the tribunal additionally found Freeman guilty of ordering testosterone, a performance-enhancing drug restricted by World Anti-Doping Agency and UK Anti-Doping rules, for a Team Sky cyclist in 2011, "knowing or believing" it was to help dope a cyclist. After the decision, Freeman was permanently struck off the medical register by the General Medical Council.

Following a UK Anti-Doping (UKAD) investigation, he was banned from all sport for a period of four years for "possession of a prohibited substance" and "tampering or attempted tampering with any part of doping control".

== Career ==
Freeman worked as the head of medicine and head of sports science at Bolton Wanderers F.C. from 2001 to 2009. He began working for British Cycling and Team Sky in 2009.

The General Medical Council (GMC) alleged that, in May 2011, Freeman ordered 30 Testogel (testosterone) sachets from Fit4Sports Limited to the National Cycling Centre, Manchester. It is also alleged that Freeman claimed that the delivery was a mistake and later asked for confirmation to be sent from Fit4Sports asking for the return of the delivery. On 12 June 2011, Freeman received a jiffy bag from British Cycling coach Simon Cope. An investigation into the jiffy bag, conducted by UK Anti-Doping, revealed that the bag had been moved by Cope in an airplane to Geneva, Switzerland where it was driven to La Toissure, France. The contents of the package is disputed. Later in June, Freeman arranged a therapeutic use exemption (TUE) for Bradley Wiggins to take triamcinolone. Freeman denies any wrongdoing surrounding the powerful drug, stating that he was "abiding by the TUE system". Freeman has said that his laptop, where medical records of the cyclists were kept, was stolen from a Greek hotel in 2014. Thus, the contents of the jiffy bag is not certain. Freeman claims that it contained Fluimucil, but the medication is common throughout Europe; this questions the need to have the package sent by air.

He resigned from British Cycling in October 2017, citing "stress related issues".

== Medical tribunal ==
Freeman faced a tribunal before the Medical Practitioners Tribunal Service (MPTS), with proceedings stretching over two years. The tribunal began in early November 2019, and the allegations related to the incidents in May 2011. He admitted to 18 of the 22 allegations against him, including the claim "that he asked supplier Fit4Sport to falsely claim the Testogel has been sent in error". The employee who sent the false email claims that "she trusted Dr Freeman because he is a doctor" and also that the 30 Testogel sachets were never returned to the company.

Although Freeman admitted to the allegations, he claimed that the testosterone was intended for former British Cycling technical director Shane Sutton to treat his alleged erectile dysfunction, which Sutton strongly denied. Freeman's lawyer, Mary O'Rourke, had "confrontational exchanges" with Sutton, resulting in him calling Freeman "spineless" before leaving the tribunal. Tensions between Sutton and Freeman were high throughout the tribunal and the latter did not return to the tribunal after the premature leave.

The tribunal denied Freeman's request to drop the remaining four charges. Freeman maintained that he did not order the drug "knowing or believing that it was intended for an athlete". The tribunal was adjourned due to Freeman's health, after his absence at many hearings.

The tribunal resumed in October 2020. Freeman said he used "a screwdriver or blunt instrument" to destroy a laptop that may have contained information important to the investigation. Freeman said he did so out of fear that information could be hacked, and stated the incident had occurred during a period of ill-health. Freeman also said that he secretly took the 30 sachets of Testogel home on the day it was delivered to the National Cycling Centre and washed them down the sink and claimed that he complained to senior management about alleged misuse of resources by Sutton, including an allegation he spent £6,000 of British Cycling money on personal cosmetic dentistry. He also alleged that ex-medical director Steve Peters had asked him to treat senior management and staff as well as riders free of charge. Peters denied Freeman's claim that he "gave the green light to unregulated medicine, out of British Cycling supplies, to be given to senior management and selected staff".

On 14 October, Freeman admitted to losing medical information from a third computer after the Union Cycliste Internationale (UCI) requested blood data from riders after the 2011 Giro d'Italia and the 2011 Tour de France. On the final day of Freeman's cross examination which stretched into its seventh week, Freeman claimed he was unaware that testosterone could be used to enhance sports performance in 2011 at the time of his alleged misconduct. He stated he "came into cycling quite fresh" and that he never discussed the topic of drug doping with Peters at the time.

The tribunal was adjourned again on 26 November to resume once more on 22 January 2021. Freeman's lawyers had asked MPTS for a further adjournment of proceedings to allow him to help administer COVID-19 vaccines, but MPTS denied this request, saying that an adjournment was neither "proportionate or in the interests of justice". During its summation on 22 January, the GMC contended that Freeman had worked with athletes who had previously doped when buying testosterone to boost the performance of an unnamed rider. Just five days later, the MPTS confirmed the tribunal would be delayed once again until 6 February, due to "unforeseen circumstances".

On 12 March, the tribunal found Freeman guilty of ordering banned testosterone "knowing or believing" it was to help dope a rider. The tribunal ruled that Freeman ordered Testogel with the knowledge "it was to be administered to an athlete to improve their athletic performance". The tribunal found that Freeman's actions were "incapable of innocent explanation". Freeman said that he was made a scapegoat, but there is no evidence of any wrongdoing by Freeman's colleagues, British Cycling, or Team Sky.

On 17 March, the tribunal moved into its second phase which considered Freeman's fitness to practise medicine in light of its verdict. The GMC argued that Freeman was unfit to practise due to "the seriousness of misconduct, repetition of misconduct and lack of insight into his misconduct." The next day, the tribunal ruled that Freeman's fitness to practise was impaired. Freeman said he was "shocked" by the verdict and that he "was not a doper". On 19 March, Freeman was permanently struck off the medical register. Medical Practitioners Tribunal Service chair Neil Dalton said that the tribunal's determination was "that erasure is the only sufficient sanction which would protect patients, maintain public confidence in the profession and send a clear message to Dr Freeman, the profession and the public that his misconduct constituted behaviour unbefitting and incompatible with that of a registered doctor." Freeman lost his job as a general practitioner at the Great Harwood Medical Centre in Lancashire.

In April 2021, Richard Freeman lodged an appeal at the High Court in Manchester to contest the verdict of the tribunal. The appeal hearing was expected to begin in November 2021 but was adjourned in early November by the judge. In January 2023, the High Court rejected Freeman's appeal - stating there was "nothing wrong" with the tribunal's process or conclusion.

== UK Anti-Doping Investigation ==
In February 2021, UK Anti-Doping (UKAD) charged Freeman with two anti-doping rule violations: "possession of a prohibited substance" and "tampering or attempted tampering with any part of doping control". Freeman stated his intention to contest part of the charges, and requested a hearing.

Following Freeman's decision to appeal the findings of the Medical Practitioners Tribunal to the High Court, UKAD announced on 1 June 2021 it was pausing its investigation until the conclusion of his appeal. His appeal was rejected by the High Court on 16 January 2023 allowing the UK Anti-Doping Investigation to resume.

The National Anti-Doping Panel (NADP) considered UKAD's case in July 2023 and found both charges proven - "possession of a prohibited substance" and "tampering or attempted tampering with any part of doping control". Freeman was handed a four year ban from all sport, backdated to 22 December 2020, the date on which he was suspended.
