= Gibraltar Cycling Association =

Sports governing body

- Sport: Cycle racing
- Abbreviation: GCA
- Affiliation: British Cycling
- Regional affiliation: UEC
- President: Chris Nuñez
- (Gibraltar)

The Gibraltar Cycling Association (GCA) is the governing body for bicycle racing in the British overseas territory of Gibraltar.

The national governing body for the territory is British Cycling in the United Kingdom. The current head of the GCA is Chris Nuñez.

== See also ==
- Sport in Gibraltar
