= Maggie Gordon-Smith =

British cyclist

Maggie Gordon-Smith (married name Maggie Thompson)
Personal information
- Born: Hereford, Herefordshire

Cycling career
- Sport: Cycling
- Disciplines: Road, Track cycling
- Role: Rider
- Rider type: Pursuit

Amateur teams
- 1968-72: Evesham Wheelers
- 1972-73: Beacon RCC
- 1978: Gannet CC

Margaret (Maggie) Gordon-Smith (married name Maggie Thompson) is a retired British female track cyclist.

== Biography ==
Gordon-Smith is a two times British champion, after winning the 3,000 metres Pursuit Championship at the 1977 British National Track Championships and 1978 British National Track Championships.

Gordon-Smith started cycling with the Evesham & District Wheelers Cycling Club in 1968 before moving to Beacon RCC. She had competed in her maiden name of Gordon-Smith until marrying Andrew Thompson in 1976 and then competed in her married name. The pair had a business making bike frames. She retired in 1978.
