= Isle of Man Cycling Association =

The Isle of Man Cycling Association is the local governing body for bicycle racing on the Isle of Man.

The national governing body for the island is British Cycling. The Isle of Man, being outside the jurisdiction of Great Britain, where the National Cyclists' Union had a self-imposed ban on massed racing on the roads, provided massed races for riders from the UK. Some of these events grew into the Manx Cycling Week, which followed and was based on the TT motorcycle races. The biggest races were the Manx International, over three laps of the Snaefell TT course, and the Manx Premier for professional riders using a shorter circuit through Clypse.

The Isle of Man Cycling Association administers racing on the island and selects teams to represent it but the island is otherwise represented by British Cycling.

== Campaigns ==
In 2015, the IOM Cycling Association supported a campaign lobbying for a safe passing distance to protect cyclists from vehicles. In 2020, it campaigned for reduced speed limits.

== Notable cyclists ==
Notable Manx cyclists have included the world championship rider, Millie Robinson; the 1970s professionals Nigel Dean and Steve Joughin; and Mark Cavendish, a Commonwealth Games medallist who rode in the 2007 and 2008 Tour de France - winning 4 stages in the '08 edition, and a British record of 6 stages in '09.
