= Josh Charlton =

British cyclist

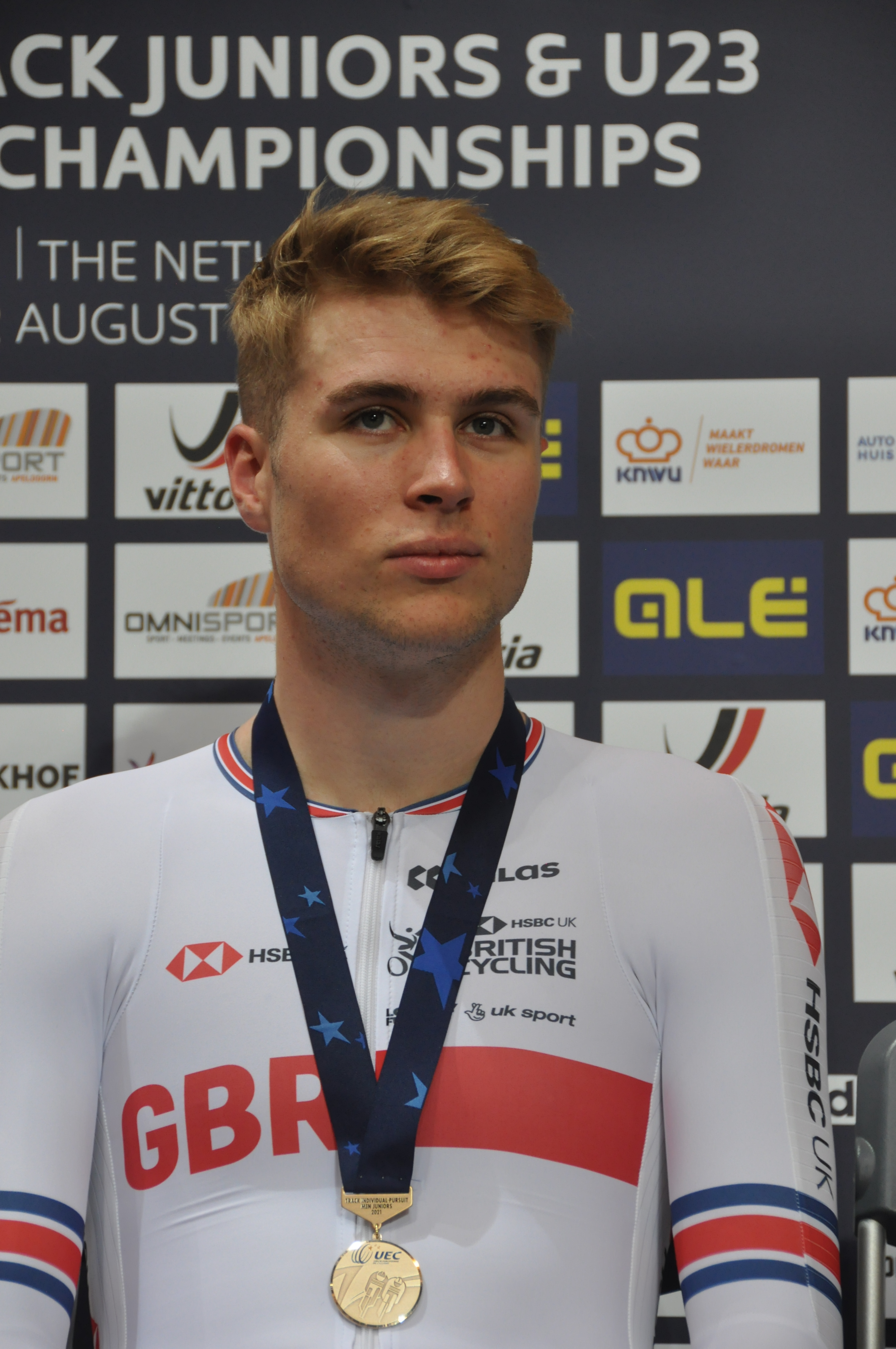
- Charlton, Apeldoorn, European Junior Track Championships, 2021.

Personal information
- Born: 10 February 2003 (age 23) Sherburn, County Durham, England
- Height: 1.91 m (6 ft 3 in)

Cycling career
- Sport: Cycling
- Disciplines: Track; Road
- Role: Rider

Amateur teams
- 2021: Fensham Howes-Mas Design
- 2022: Team Inspired

Professional team
- 2023–2024: Saint Piran

Major wins
- Track World Championships Individual pursuit (2025)
Medal record
Representing Great Britain
Men's track cycling
World Championships
Gold medal – first place	2025 Santiago	Individual pursuit
Silver medal – second place	2024 Ballerup	Individual pursuit
Silver medal – second place	2024 Ballerup	Team pursuit
European Championships
Gold medal – first place	2025 Heusden-Zolder	Individual pursuit
Silver medal – second place	2025 Heusden-Zolder	Team pursuit
European Under-23 Championships
Gold medal – first place	2023 Anadia	Team pursuit
Gold medal – first place	2025 Anadia	Team pursuit
Gold medal – first place	2025 Anadia	Individual pursuit
Silver medal – second place	2023 Anadia	Individual pursuit
European Junior Championships
Gold medal – first place	2021 Apeldoorn	Madison
Gold medal – first place	2021 Apeldoorn	Team pursuit
Bronze medal – third place	2021 Apeldoorn	Individual pursuit

Josh Charlton (born 20 February 2003) is a British track and road cyclist who is the 2025 Track Cycling Individual Pursuit World Champion.

== Career ==
At his debut elite Track World Championships in October 2024 Charlton rode to a remarkable sub-4 minutes time in the 4 km Individual Pursuit heat to become the world record holder, going on to win a silver medal in the final. He was only the third man ever to drop below the 4 minute mark, and the second at sea level.

In 2025 at the 2025 British Cycling National Track Championships, Charlton won his second national title. He competed for Great Britain at the 2025 UEC European Track Championships in Belgium, winning the men's individual pursuit. On 24 October 2025, at the 2025 UCI Track Cycling World Championships in Santiago, Chile, Charlton won the men’s individual pursuit to take the world title.

On the road, Charlton most recently rode for UCI Continental team Saint Piran.

== Major results ==
=== Road ===
2021
2nd Road race, National Junior Championships
2023
1st Time trial, National Under-23 Championships
6th Time trial, UCI World Under-23 Championships
2025
1st Stage 5 Rás Tailteann
2026
3rd Time trial, National Championships

=== Track ===
2021
UEC European Junior Championships

1st Team pursuit
1st Madison (with Joshua Giddings)
3rd Individual pursuit

National Junior Championships

1st Individual pursuit
1st Scratch
2nd Madison (with Josh Tarling)

2022
1st Elimination, National Championships
2023
UEC European Under-23 Championships

1st Team pursuit
2nd Individual pursuit

1st Team pursuit, UCI Nations Cup, Milton
2024
1st Team pursuit, UCI Nations Cup, Adelaide
UCI World Championships

2nd Team pursuit
2nd Individual pursuit

2025
1st Individual pursuit, UCI World Championships
UEC European Championships

1st Individual pursuit
2nd Team pursuit

UEC European Under-23 Championships

1st Individual pursuit
1st Team pursuit

1st Individual pursuit, National Championships
2026
2nd Individual pursuit, National Championships

==== World Records ====
Date	Time	Meet	Event	Location
18 October 2024	3:59.304	UCI Track Cycling World Championships	Individual Pursuit	Ballerup, Denmark

== See also ==
- List of world records in track cycling
