= Sally Dawes =

English cyclist

Personal information
- Full name: Sally Dawes
- Born: 27 June 1973 (age 53) England

Cycling career
- Sport: Cycling
- Disciplines: Road & Track
- Role: Rider

Amateur team
- Leicestershire RC

Professional team
- 1994: Raleigh

Sally Dawes (born 27 June 1973) is an English former racing cyclist.

== Cycling career ==
Dawes was a silver medalist at the Junior Points Race World Championships in Moscow in 1989, and again at the Junior Road World Championships in Colorado Springs in 1991.

She represented England in the 3,000 metres individual pursuit, at the 1990 Commonwealth Games in Auckland, New Zealand.

== Personal life ==
She was for a period known as Sally Timmis, following a brief marriage to Adrian Timmis.

== Major results ==
1989
2nd Points race, UCI Track World Junior Championships
1990
3rd Road race, National Road Championships
1991
2nd Road race, UCI Road World Junior Championships
1993
2nd Overall National Road Race Series
1994
2nd Individual pursuit, National Track Championships
