= 2025 UCI Track Cycling World Championships – Men's individual pursuit =

Men's individual pursuit at the 2025 UCI Track Cycling World Championships
- Venue: Peñalolén Velodrome
- Location: Santiago, Chile
- Dates: 24 October
- Competitors: 27 from 19 nations
- Winning time: 4:04.122

Medalists
gold medal	Josh Charlton	Great Britain
silver medal	Rasmus Pedersen	Denmark
bronze medal	Anders Johnson	United States

The Men's individual pursuit competition at the 2025 UCI Track Cycling World Championships was held on 24 October 2025.

== Results ==
=== Qualifying ===
The qualifying was started at 11:00. The two fastest riders raced for gold, third-and fourth fastest riders raced for bronze.

Rank	Name	Nation	Time	Behind	Notes
1	Josh Charlton	Great Britain	4:02.844		Q
2	Rasmus Pedersen	Denmark	4:05.092	+2.248	Q
3	James Moriarty	Australia	4:05.944	+3.100	q
4	Anders Johnson	United States	4:06.793	+3.949	q
5	Etienne Grimod	Italy	4:07.086	+4.242	
6	Charlie Tanfield	Great Britain	4:07.285	+4.441	
7	Felix Groß	Germany	4:08.250	+5.406	
8	Robin Juel Skivild	Denmark	4:08.707	+5.863	
9	Ben Oliver	New Zealand	4:10.004	+7.160	
10	Moritz Binder	Germany	4:11.865	+9.021	
11	Michael Gill	Great Britain	4:12.057	+9.213	
12	Renato Favero	Italy	4:12.394	+9.550	
13	Erwan Besnier	France	4:12.783	+9.939	
14	Luca Bühlmann	Switzerland	4:12.867	+10.023	
15	Chris Ernst	Canada	4:13.197	+10.353	
16	Sean Richardson	Canada	4:18.081	+15.237	
17	Joan Martí Bennassar	Spain	4:18.284	+15.440	
18	Diego Rojas	Chile	4:19.364	+16.520	
19	Bartosz Rudyk	Poland	4:19.612	+16.768	
20	Shoki Kawano	Japan	4:20.138	+17.294	
21	Diogo Narciso	Portugal	4:21.511	+18.667	
22	Milan Van den Haute	Belgium	4:21.515	+18.671	
23	Ramis Dinmukhametov	Kazakhstan	4:23.722	+20.878	
24	Tetsuo Yamamoto	Japan	4:23.795	+20.951	
25	Kacper Majewski	Poland	4:24.548	+21.704	
26	Diego Jamen	Uruguay	4:27.779	+24.935	
—	Anderson Arboleda	Colombia	Disqualified		

=== Finals ===
The finals were started at 11:00.

Rank	Name	Nation	Time	Behind
Gold medal race
1st place, gold medalist(s)	Josh Charlton	Great Britain	4:04.122	
2nd place, silver medalist(s)	Rasmus Pedersen	Denmark	4:07.496	+3.374
Bronze medal race
3rd place, bronze medalist(s)	Anders Johnson	United States	4:08.699	
4	James Moriarty	Australia	4:11.113	+2.414
