= Tony Mayer =

Personal information
- Nationality: British
- Born: 1962 (age 63–64) Portsmouth

Sport
- Club: Portsmouth Cycling Club / G S Strada
Medal record
Representing Great Britain and England
Cycling Team pursuit
Bronze medal – third place	Junior world championship Mexico	1980
Gold medal – first place	Oceanic games New Zealand	1981
Bronze medal – third place	Commonwealth Games Brisbane	1982

Anthony Richard 'Tony' Mayer' (born 1962), is a male retired cyclist who competed for Great Britain and England and was selected for the 1980 Moscow Summer Olympics but glandular fever prevented him competing.

== Cycling career ==
He represented England in the 4,000 metres individual pursuit and won a bronze medal in the 4,000 metres team pursuit with Darryl Webster, Shaun Wallace, Gary Sadler and Paul Curran, at the 1982 Commonwealth Games in Brisbane, Queensland, Australia.

He won the 1978 and 1979 Junior Pursuit National Championship before finishing runner-up to Shaun Wallace in the 1982 senior pursuit at the 1982 British National Track Championships. 2nd National 25 mile Championship 1982 to Dave Lloyd winner.
