= Jacob Smith (cyclist) =

British para-cyclist (born 2000)

- Jacob Smith (2026)

Personal information
- Nickname: Jake
- Nationality: British
- Born: 13 February 2000 (age 26)

Sport
- Sport: Para-cycling
- Disability class: C3
Medal record
Men's para-cycling
Representing Great Britain
Track World Championships
Bronze medal – third place	2026 Apeldoorn	Scratch race C3

Jacob Smith (born 13 February 2000) is a British para-cyclist.

== Career ==
In February 2025, Smith competed at the 2025 British Cycling National Track Championships and won a gold medal in the 1km time trial C3 event, and a silver medal in the medal in the individual pursuit C3 event. He also won a gold medal in the mixed team sprint C event, along with Rebecca Newark, and Samuel Davies, with a time of 52.989 seconds.

In October 2026, he was selected to compete at the 2026 UCI Para-cycling Track World Championships. He won a bronze medal in the scratch race C3 event.

== Personal life ==
At 19 years old Smith was playing rugby at county level when a spinal cord injury left him paralysed down his left side.
