= UK Anti-Doping =

- Website: www.ukad.org.uk

UK Anti-Doping (UKAD) is the organisation responsible for protecting sport in the United Kingdom from doping. It is a non-departmental public body of the Department for Culture, Media and Sport and is structured as a company limited by guarantee.

UKAD was formed as an independent body in November 2009, having previously been part of UK Sport. It is responsible for both the planning and implementation of anti-doping programmes. It also ensures all sports bodies in the UK comply with the World Anti-Doping Code as set out by the World Anti-Doping Agency (WADA).
