= 2025 UEC European Track Championships – Men's individual pursuit =

Men's individual pursuit at the 2025 UEC European Track Championships
- Venue: Velodroom Limburg, Heusden-Zolder
- Date: 14 February
- Competitors: 20 from 11 nations
- Winning time: 4:02.882

Medalists
gold medal	Josh Charlton	Great Britain
silver medal	Ivo Oliveira	Portugal
bronze medal	Michael Gill	Great Britain

The men's individual pursuit competition at the 2025 UEC European Track Championships was held on 14 February 2025.

== Results ==
=== Qualifying ===
The first two racers raced for gold, the third and fourth fastest rider raced for the bronze medal.

Rank	Name	Nation	Time	Behind	Notes
1	Josh Charlton	Great Britain	3:59.997		QG
2	Ivo Oliveira	Portugal	4:04.475	+4.478	QG
3	Michael Gill	Great Britain	4:06.915	+6.918	QB
4	Renato Favero	Italy	4:08.862	+8.865	QB
5	Lasse Norman Leth	Denmark	4:09.800	+9.803	
6	Etienne Grimod	Italy	4:09.838	+9.841	
7	Robin Juel Skivild	Denmark	4:09.840	+9.843	
8	Bruno Keßler	Germany	4:11.144	+11.147	
9	Noah Vandenbranden	Belgium	4:12.230	+12.233	
10	Erwan Besnier	France	4:13.458	+13.461	
11	Thibaut Bernard	Belgium	4:16.236	+16.239	
12	Adam Woźniak	Poland	4:17.299	+17.302	
13	Erik Martorell	Spain	4:17.380	+17.383	
14	Noah Bögli	Switzerland	4:17.415	+17.418	
15	Kacper Majewski	Poland	4:17.498	+17.501	
16	Camille Charret	France	4:17.950	+17.953	
17	Luca Bühlmann	Switzerland	4:19.437	+19.440	
18	Leon Arenz	Germany	4:20.919	+20.922	
19	Joan Martí Bennassar	Spain	4:22.470	+22.473	
20	Vitālijs Korņilovs	Latvia	4:31.427	+31.430	

=== Finals ===
Rank	Name	Nation	Time	Behind	Notes
Gold medal final
1st place, gold medalist(s)	Josh Charlton	Great Britain	4:02.882		
2nd place, silver medalist(s)	Ivo Oliveira	Portugal	4:03.631	+0.749	
Bronze medal final
3rd place, bronze medalist(s)	Michael Gill	Great Britain	4:09.859		
4	Renato Favero	Italy	4:12.169	+2.310	
