= Scottish Cycling =

Governing body for cycle sport in Scotland

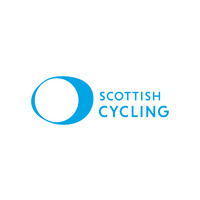
- Sport: Cycle racing
- Abbreviation: SC
- Founded: 1952
- Affiliation: British Cycling
- Headquarters: Sir Chris Hoy Velodrome Emirates Arena 1000 London Road Glasgow G40 3HY
- President: Kathy Gilchrist
- CEO: Nick Rennie
- Operating income: £3m

Official website
- www.scottishcycling.org.uk
- (Scotland)

Scottish Cycling, legally the Scottish Cyclists' Union (SCU), is the governing body for cycle sport in Scotland and is part of British Cycling, the national governing body in Britain.

Scottish Cycling is currently located in the Sir Chris Hoy Velodrome, Glasgow. It covers road bicycle racing, track cycling, mountain bike racing, cyclo-cross, BMX racing, cycle speedway and time trialing.

Scottish Cycling introduced the MBLA award scheme (previously Scottish Mountain Bike Leader Award), qualification in the UK for leading organised groups on mountain biking rides. This award is now simply called the Mountain Bike Leader Award.

Scottish Cycling has a performance department to help train and develop Scottish athletes. It also enters Scottish teams for events such as the Commonwealth Games, UCI Europe Tour events and UCI Mountain Bike events.

== History ==
In 1931, Scottish cycling clubs formed a loose association named the Scottish Amateur Racing Association (SARA), which concerned itself with organisation of amateur road time trials. In 1936, a meeting of all Scottish clubs resolved to form a new body to represent all road time-trialling. This body, the Scottish Amateur Cycling Association (SACA), took over from the SARA in 1937.

In the same year, the National Cyclists' Union (NCU) formed a Scottish section to regulate mass-start road and track cycling. Racing on the open road had been discouraged by the NCU since the 19th century for fear that it would jeopardise the place of all cyclists on the road. Mass races were held on private circuits and consequently there were few races.

A desire to race on the open road led some clubs to affiliate to the rival British League of Racing Cyclists (BLRC) in 1945. The following year, the Scottish section of the NCU reformed itself into an autonomous body affiliated to the NCU, the Scottish National Cyclists' Union (SNCU). In response, in 1947, the Scottish BLRC reconstituted itself into the Scottish Cyclists' Union (SCU), an autonomous body affiliated to the BLRC. The inaugural meeting at the Clarion Rooms in Queen's Crescent, Glasgow, on 8 December 1946, resolved to ask the Union Cycliste Internationale, the world governing body, for recognition as the governing organisation in Scotland. The first president was Tom Cook, Member of Parliament for Dundee.

In 1952 the SCU, SNCU and SACA amalgamated into a single body, which kept the Scottish Cyclists' Union name. That has since been shortened to Scottish Cycling (SC).

As of 2015, the organisation has an annual budget of around £1.7 million, around half of which is provided by sportscotland.

== Responsibilities ==
=== Board and governance responsibilities ===
The board's primary responsibility is to lead the strategic direction and policy of the organisation. It is also responsible for reviewing the progress being made towards the strategic aims. The organisation operates on a day-to-day basis through employed staff and a number of sub-committees or individual appointments. Matters of policy and strategic direction, together with matters specifically referred to within the rules, are reserved for the board; other matters are delegated to operational levels. On a day-to-day basis, the chief executive is responsible for all aspects of the organisation and for ensuring the effective delivery of the organisation’s corporate strategy. The current chief executive is Nick Rennie.

== Membership ==
Scottish Cycling is a membership organisation and has seen a steady growth in membership over the last few years as cycling continues to grow in popularity. It measures its membership numbers by those who take out a British Cycling membership & live in Scotland. Scottish Cycling campaigns on behalf of all cyclists and has a comprehensive benefits package, local clubs (172) provide additional support for members, organising many activities and promoting many of the 600 plus events.

Membership
Area	Category	2010	2015	(%) Change ‘10 - ’15
Membership	TOTAL	3873	9098	134
	Gold	854	1013	18
	Silver	2161	3795	75
	Bronze	566	1039	84
	Ride	292	3194	994
Age Category	Senior	3113	7996	14.2
	Junior	131	203	55
	Youth	249	384	54
	Under 12	180	505	180
Gender	Male	3358	7669	116
	Female	513	1428	178

== See also ==
- Sport in Scotland
- Scottish Female Cyclists
- Scottish Male Cyclists
