= Elisabeth Simpson =

British para-cyclist (born 1995)

Personal information
- Nickname: Lissie
- Nationality: British
- Born: 29 September 1995 (age 31)

Sport
- Sport: Para-cycling
- Disability class: C2
Medal record
Women's para-cycling
Representing Great Britain
Track World Championships
Silver medal – second place	2026 Apeldoorn	Sprint C2

Elisabeth Simpson (born 29 September 1995) is a British para-cyclist.

== Career ==
Simpson grew up playing hockey and football at the regional level, and was a member of Great Britain's under-19 handball team, before transitioning to para-cycling. In February 2025, she competed at the 2025 British Cycling National Track Championships and won a gold medal in the 1 km time trial C1–5 event, with a world record time.

In October 2026, she was selected to compete at the 2026 UCI Para-cycling Track World Championships. She won a silver medal in the sprint C2 event.

== Personal life ==
In 2015, while having surgery on a brain tumour, Simpson suffered a stroke that left her paralyzed on the left side. She is a physiotherapist at University Hospitals Coventry and Warwickshire NHS Trust.
