= Rebecca Newark =

British para-cyclist (born 1999)

- Neward (c.), World Champion Time Trial 2026

Personal information
- Nationality: British
- Born: 29 May 1999 (age 27)

Sport
- Sport: Para-cycling
- Disability: Clubfoot
- Disability class: C5
Medal record
Women's para-cycling
Representing Great Britain
Track World Championships
Gold medal – first place	2026 Apeldoorn	1 km time trial C5

Rebecca Newark (born 29 May 1999) is a British para-cyclist.

== Career ==
In February 2025, Newark competed at the 2025 British Cycling National Track Championships and won a gold medal in the mixed team sprint C event, along with Jacob Smith, and Samuel Davies, with a time of 52.989 seconds. She also won a silver medal in the individual pursuit C5 event. In August 2025, she competed at the 2025 UCI Para-cycling Road World Championships in the time trial C5 event and finished in fourth place with a time of 35:20.67, just three seconds behind a podium finish.

In October 2026, she was selected to compete at the 2026 UCI Para-cycling Track World Championships. She won a gold medal in the 1 km time trial C5 event with a time of 1:13.091 in her Track World Championships debut.

== Personal life ==
Newark was born with clubfoot. While her left foot responded well to early casting, her right foot required surgery at six months old, leaving her with a smaller calf muscle and reduced ankle mobility. As her ankle weakened, she eventually needed an Ankle Foot Orthosis (AFO) for daily walking.
