= Phil Bayton =

British cyclist (born 1950)

Personal information
- Full name: Philip Bayton
- Nickname: The Staffordshire Engine
- Born: 18 September 1950 (age 76) Kingswinford, Staffordshire, England

Cycling career
- Sport: Cycling
- Discipline: Road
- Role: Rider

Professional teams
- 1973–74: Raleigh
- 1974: Bantel
- 1975–77: Dawes
- 1978: Holdsworth
- 1979–81: KP Crisps
- 1982–83: Coventry Eagle
- 1984: TI – Tower Housewares – Royale
- 1985: Raleigh – Weinmann
- 1986: Moducel
- 1987–89: Ever Ready

Major wins
- 1982 National Criterium Championships; 1972 Star Trophy Series; 1972 GP de France; 1983 Milk Race Stage 3; 1983 Milk Race Stage 4; 1984 Yorkshire Classic General Classification

Philip Bayton (born 18 September 1950) is a former road cyclist from Great Britain, who was a professional from 1973 to 1989.

== Amateur ==
Bayton joined the Stourbridge Cycling Club as a boy where, after a year of club rides, he started racing. Joining the Thornhill Cycling Club in Birmingham he won a handicap race at Hirwaun in South Wales as a 16-year-old junior and a year later was part of the GB Olympic squad under Norman Sheil.

After finishing third in third in the Star Trophy Series on 1970 and 1971, he finally won the Star Trophy in 1972 which led to him being selected for the 1972 Summer Olympics in Munich, West Germany. After being part of an 80-mile breakaway, he initially finished 5th in the road race, ahead of teammate Phil Edwards won the bunch sprint to finish 6th. However, after Spanish rider Jaime Huelamo failed a drug test, he was later moved up to 4th.

== Professional ==
Struggling to fund his racing career at a time when strict amateur rules prevented any kind of cash prize however small, Bayton found himself having to turn professional, joining Raleigh for the 1973 season with his friend Dave Lloyd. The pair came to the notice of the Italian media with an epic 100 mile breakaway lasting five hours at the Milan–San Remo race which led to an invitation to the Baracchi Trophy two-up time trial. Together they finished third behind Felice Gimondi and Martin Rodriguez in front of 50,000 fans in the Brescia football stadium.

Bayton turned down a move to the Belgian-based Watney's squad in 1974, regretting it by the end of season when he left Raleigh to work at the Russell Hobbs factory in the West Midlands with the intention to retire from pro-racing. However his career was saved by Hugh Porter who convinced him to join him at Bantel with whom he finished 3rd in the national road race.

In 1982, Bayton finally won the national criterium title at Newport in South Wales, beating Moducel rider Phil Corley in a sprint after the pair had lapped the rest of the field.

== Team management ==
After Bayton retired from racing, he managed the Everready-Halfords team that on the British professional circuit in the late 1980s.
