= Ken Mitchell (cyclist) =

British cyclist

Personal information
- Born: 15 September 1930 (age 96)

Cycling career
- Sport: Cycling
- Role: Rider

Ken Mitchell (born 15 September 1930) is a British racing cyclist. He rode in the 1955 Tour de France.
