= Gordon Ian =

English racing cyclist (1930–2006)

Personal information
- Born: 29 December 1930
- Died: 29 June 2006 (aged 75)

Cycling career
- Sport: Cycling

Gordon Ian (29 December 1930 – 29 June 2006) was an English racing cyclist who won the British 25-mile (40 km) time trial championships three times, 1955, 1959 and 1960.

== Early life ==
Ian was born Gordon Ian Daft, dropping his surname on conscription into the R.A.F. in 1952. He came from a sporting family; his uncle, Harry Daft (5 April 1866 - 12 January 1945) was an English footballer who played for Notts County, winning the FA cup with that team in 1894 and making five appearances for the England national football team. Harry Daft was also a first class cricketer, playing 200 matches for Nottinghamshire County Cricket Club. Another uncle, Richard Daft (25 October 1863 – 27 March 1934) was an English first-class cricketer who played for Nottinghamshire. Their father, Richard Daft (2 November 1835 – 18 July 1900) captained the Nottinghamshire County Cricket Club from 1871 to 1880.

== Cycling career ==
Ian’s sport in the R.A.F. was cross-country running. His first experience of cycling came when he was stationed at RAF Swinderby in Lincolnshire, which was 30 miles from his home in Hucknall, so he bought a bike to cover the distance between the two. Once out of the services Ian began a career as a sheet metal worker, a trade learned in the R.A.F., and joined the Mansfield Victoria Cycling Club.

In 1954, he began competing in cycle races, his most notable early victory being the 1954 Cliff Camm Memorial 25-mile (40 km) time trial, a race he won for the following three years as well. His first national title came in 1955, when he won the British 25-mile (40 km) time trial championships in Bedfordshire with a time of 57 minutes 51 seconds.

Third in the 1957 British 25-mile (40 km) time trial championships and second the following year, during which time Ian switched clubs to Nottingham Wheelers, was followed by his second British 25-mile (40 km) time trial title in 1959. Ian’s winning time was 56 minutes 03 seconds, Ken Craven was second in 56 minutes 12 seconds and Alf Engers third in 56 minutes 22 seconds.

Ian, who was an accomplished track rider, also finished second in the 1959 British 4000-metre individual pursuit championships, held at the Fallowfield Stadium in Manchester. He was beaten in the final by the reigning Amateur Pursuit World Champion, Norman Sheil of Liverpool. This was also the year when Ian broke the British record for a 50-mile time trial twice.

Ian’s third and final British 25-mile (40 km) time trial title came in 1960, when on a Lincolnshire course he recorded 56 minutes 35 seconds to second placed Geoff Saunders’s 57 minutes 9 seconds. He was at that time the third rider, after George Fell (1949 and 1950) and Stanley Higginson (1952 and 1953), to win two British 25-mile (40 km) time trial titles in succession. Gordon Ian ended his cycle racing career the following year.
