= Brendan McKeown =

British cyclist

Personal information
- Born: 18 March 1944 (age 82) Welwyn Garden City, England
- Height: 186 cm (6 ft 1 in)
- Weight: 80 kg (176 lb)

Cycling career
- Sport: Cycling

Amateur team
- Welwyn Wheelers

Brendan Patrick McKeown (born 18 March 1944) is a former British cyclist who competed at the 1968 Summer Olympics.

== Biography ==
McKeown represented the England team in the 4,000 metres individual pursuit, at the 1966 British Empire and Commonwealth Games in Kingston, Jamaica.

At the 1968 Olympic Games in Mexico City, he competed in the 1000m time trial.

Mckeown won the British National Individual Pursuit Championships in 1967 and 1968.

National record holder for the 1 kilometre time trial time:- 1 min 11 seconds. Set a new British Kilometre record at the 1968 Mexico Olympics with a 1 min 6 seconds ride.
