= Adrian Timmis =

English cyclist

Personal information
- Born: 20 June 1964 (age 62) Stoke-on-Trent, Staffordshire, England

Cycling career
- Sport: Cycling
- Role: Rider

Adrian Timmis (born 20 June 1964) is an English former professional racing cyclist.

In 1981 he rode in the British National Track Championships. He then represented Britain in the team pursuit event at the 1984 Olympic Games in Los Angeles. Between 1986 and 1995, he was a professional cyclist. He rode the Tour de France in 1987, and competed in the international Paris-Nice race, Criterium International, Tour de Romandie, Liège–Bastogne–Liège, La Flèche Wallonne, Amstel Gold and the Het Volk.

Towards the end of its professional career, he began mountain biking in 1989, while going forward to ride for Raleigh Cycles.

He worked for the Linda McCartney Foods team and the British National team in the World Championships, Olympic Games and Commonwealth Games.

== Major results ==
=== Road ===
1985
1st Final Leg Milk Race
1st Tour of Lancashire
1st Tour of Merseyside

1986
2nd National Championships Professional Race Road Britain
4th Nissan Classic, Ireland
7th GP Isbergues, France

1987
70th Tour de France
8th Midi Libre

1st Leg 4, Midi Libre
2nd Leg 6a, Midi Libre

1988
1st Tour of Delyn

1995
1st Sky TV Crit Rochester

=== Track ===
1981
1st Pursuit Britain Track National Championships (Junior)
2nd Races Track National Championships Points Britain (Junior)
3rd Pursuit Track National Championships Team Britain (Junior)

1985
2nd Pursuit Britain Track National Championships (Amateur)
3rd Pursuit Track National Championships Team Britain (Amateur)

1987
3rd Pursuit Britain Track National Championships (Professional)

=== Mountain biking ===
1992
3rd Series Britain National Points

1994
3rd British Hill Climb Championships

1995
2nd Series Britain National Points

1st leg Nannerch, Britain National Points Series
1st leg Castle Combe, Britain National Points Series

=== Cyclo-cross ===
2004
1st National Championships Cyclo Cross Britain (Veteran)

2004/2005
4th Series Britain National Points
