= Ed Lowe (cyclist) =

English cyclist (born 2003)

Ed Lowe OLY
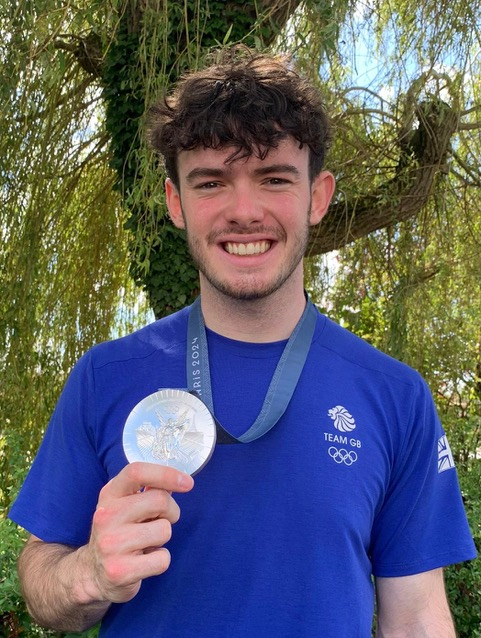
- Lowe in 2024

Personal information
- Full name: Edward Owen Lowe
- Born: 24 August 2003 (age 23) Stamford, Lincolnshire, England

Cycling career
- Sport: Cycling
- Current team: Team Inspired / GBCT
- Discipline: Track
- Role: "Man 1" Team Sprint
- Rider type: Track Sprinter
Medal record
Men's track cycling
Representing Great Britain
Olympic Games
Silver medal – second place	2024 Paris	Team sprint
UEC European U23 and Junior Championships
Gold medal – first place	2021 Apeldoorn	Junior men's team sprint

Edward Owen Lowe OLY (born 24 August 2003) is an English track cyclist who competes in sprint events. Representing Great Britain, he won a silver medal in the team sprint at the 2024 Summer Olympics.

== Career ==
Growing up in Stamford, Lincolnshire, Lowe's first experience of cycling came through the Fenland Clarion Cycling Club. Later he rode in endurance races regionally and nationally for Bourne Wheelers before switching to track cycling in 2018.

He was selected for the Great Britain Cycling Team (GBCT) apprenticeship scheme at 15 and, two years later, he was enrolled into the Junior GBCT programme, going on to become a team sprint European Junior Champion.

As part of Team Inspired he won a gold medal at the 2023 British Cycling National Track Championships in the team sprint. Lowe took part in his first elite level Nations Cup in Canada in April 2023, helping the team win a bronze medal.

He moved up to the GBCT podium squad in October 2023. In February 2024, he was a member of the British team that pipped China by 0.3 seconds, in the minor final, to secure bronze at the Nations Cup event in Australia. He followed that performance up later in the month by winning a second successive national team sprint title with Team Inspired at the 2024 British Cycling National Track Championships. Returning to Canada in April 2024, Lowe and his teammates secured Nations Cup silver medals, losing out in the final to the Netherlands.

On 24 June 2024, Lowe was named in the Great Britain team sprint line-up for the 2024 Summer Olympics. At the Games in Paris, he led out the team, also including Hamish Turnbull and Jack Carlin, to the second fastest qualifying time of 41.862 seconds. They defeated Germany in the semi-finals but lost out in the final to the Netherlands, who set a new world record, leaving Lowe and his teammates to settle for silver.

== Personal life ==
Lowe attended St Gilbert's Primary School, Stamford and The King's School, Peterborough.
