= British Cycling =

Governing body for cycling sport in Great Britain

- Sport: Cycle racing
- Abbreviation: BC
- Founded: 1959
- Affiliation: UCI
- Regional affiliation: UEC
- Headquarters: National Cycling Centre, Manchester
- President: Bob Howden
- CEO: Lee Gibbons (interim)

Official website
- britishcycling.org.uk

British Cycling (formerly the British Cycling Federation) is the main national governing body for cycle sport in Great Britain. It administers most competitive cycling in Great Britain, the Channel Islands and the Isle of Man. It represents Britain at the world body, the Union Cycliste Internationale (UCI) and selects national teams, including the Great Britain (GB) Cycling Team for races in Britain and abroad. As of 2020, it has a total membership of 165,000.

It is based at the National Cycling Centre on the site of the 2002 Commonwealth Games in Manchester.

== History ==
The British Cycling Federation (BCF) was formed in 1959 at the end of an administrative dispute within the sport. The governing body since 1878 had been the National Cyclists Union (NCU). (Note: The NCU took over control of cycling from the Amateur Athletics Association. It was originally called the Bicycle Union. It became the NCU in 1883.) The legality of cyclists on the road had not been established and the NCU worried that all cycling could be affected by police concerns about racing. The cycling historian Bernard Thompson said: "Events organised by clubs in the 1880s, although taking place on quiet country roads, were constantly interrupted by the police. Often horse-mounted policemen charged at racers and threw sticks into their wheels." The race organiser and writer, Chas Messenger, said: "Thousands of cyclists were convicted or fined for dangerous riding, many on mere suspicion and unsupported evidence."

The NCU banned all racing on the road and insisted clubs use velodromes. A rebel organisation, eventually known as the Road Time Trials Council (RTTC), began running races of individuals competing against the clock at dawn and in secrecy, to avoid police attention. The NCU eventually accepted the RTTC and the two organisations ran the sport between them, the RTTC interested only in time-trialling and the NCU administering track races and representing Britain at meetings of the UCI.

Infighting was sparked by the UCI's decision that world road championships from 1933 would be not individual contests but competitions in which riders started together. The NCU had never been against such races but insisted that in Britain they were on roads closed to traffic, such as airfields and motor-racing courses. It now had to select riders not on their talent against the clock but in a bunch. Selection races were held at Donington Park and Brooklands. Among the riders were some, like Percy Stallard, who believed races ought to be run on the open road. He organised a race from Llangollen to Wolverhampton, in 1942. The NCU suspended Stallard and others and they formed the British League of Racing Cyclists (BLRC). It and the NCU fought each other until they merged in 1959.

=== The British Cycling Federation ===
The merged organisation became the British Cycling Federation. It accepted racing on the open road and controlled all competitive cycling other than time-trialling, which remained with the RTTC. Cyclo-cross was administered by the British Cyclo-Cross Association, which was linked to the BCF. The BCF was recognised by the UCI. The first officials were perceived to be drawn largely from the NCU and there was bitterness among supporters of the former BLRC that they had been betrayed.

The BCF had offices in central London. The first were in the headquarters of the Sports Council in Park Crescent, near Hyde Park. They subsequently moved to other London premises on Brompton Road and Upper Woburn Place, before moving out of the capital to Rockingham Road, Kettering, Northamptonshire in 1988, and finally to the velodrome in Manchester.

The British Cycling Federation was renamed simply British Cycling after it merged with the British Cyclo-Cross Association, the British Mountain Bike Federation, the English BMX Association and the British Cycle Speedway Council. Each is now a commission within the BCF.

In 1996, the BCF incurred large debts as a result of a legal dispute with Tony Doyle, who resigned from his position as President of the Federation shortly after its Board attempted to remove him. Doyle had been elected to the Presidency in late 1995 on a platform of increasing transparency and accountability in the Federation: the campaign to remove him was based on claims that he had failed to declare his role as a consultant to a company that wanted to act as the promoter for the 1996 UCI Track Cycling World Championships in Manchester. In December 1996, the report of auditors from the UK Sports Council into the Federation's finances and management found that there were serious shortcomings in its procedures for accounting and control of finances and potential conflicts of interests between board members and leading companies in the cycling sector. The board were then removed by the membership and replaced with an emergency management committee. As a result of the report, Minister for Sport Iain Sproat warned that the BCF's Sports Council grants could be withdrawn and that it could be banned from applying for Lottery money. Brian Cookson was elected as president soon afterwards: he described the organisation's situation at the time as "close to bankruptcy, 14,000 members and falling, one Olympic gold in 76 years and not much else to show. It was pretty dire".

=== International dominance ===
In December 1997, British Cycling appointed Peter Keen as its Performance Director, with initial responsibility for £900,000 of funding granted by the UK Sports Council on the basis of a one-year interim World Class Performance Plan. He was chosen ahead of Steve Paulding and Paul Sherwen. Keen immediately outlined the focus of the Plan, emphasising that it would mainly be aimed at targeting track cycling due to the large number of Olympic medals on offer. He spent much of the next year developing an eight-year plan to secure longer-term funding: in January 1999 it was announced that British Cycling had secured lottery funding for six years, with an award of £2.5 million for the first year. Later that year, the GB team sprint squad took the first British sprint medal at a World Championship for 40 years at the Berlin Track Worlds.

The first fruits of the programme were harvested at the 2000 Summer Olympics: on the track, Team GB took two bronzes, a silver and a gold medal, the latter of which was taken by Jason Queally in the 1 km time trial. Following the Games, Keen started speaking publicly about what Britain needed to do to become the world number one nation in track cycling. The team backed up their Olympic success at the subsequent 2000 UCI Track Cycling World Championships on home ground in Manchester by winning five medals, including a first world title for Yvonne McGregor in the individual pursuit.

From 2001 to the present day, British cycling has greatly improved its standing in world track cycling and is now considered a dominant force in cycling. In 2001, two key members of staff were appointed, with Dave Brailsford becoming Performance Director for the World Class Performance Programme and Heiko Salzwedel joining as National Track Manager. In July 2002 the Talent Team programme was launched, which aimed to discover new riders through working with schools: riders identified through the initiative who have enjoyed success at the highest level include Dani Rowe, Laura Kenny, Peter Kennaugh, Elinor Barker and Lizzie Deignan. After a disappointing performance at the 2002 Commonwealth Games in Manchester, the squad bounced back at the Track World Championships, where they finished second in the medal table with three gold medals. That year also saw the appointment of Shane Sutton in Manchester, having previously been Welsh national coach.

In 2003, the first six riders joined British Cycling's new Olympic Academy for junior riders, under the leadership of Rod Ellingworth, with a budget of £100,000 for the first year. Among the first cohort were Ed Clancy and Mark Cavendish, although the latter was almost passed over due to his relatively poor performance in lab tests, with coaches Ellingworth, John Herety and Simon Lillistone lobbying Keen to include him due to his potential. The academy used a training base in Tuscany from 2006 to 2010, and has since returned to Italy, basing itself in Montichiari since 2016. Other notable riders who participated in the academy programme include Kennaugh, Geraint Thomas, Ian Stannard, Ben Swift and Simon Yates. That year Keen left his role, whilst continuing to work with British Cycling in a consultancy capacity until the 2004 Summer Olympics: Brailsford was appointed as his replacement.

At the 2004 Athens Olympics cycling events, Great Britain came third in the medal table: they took two golds, a silver and a bronze, with Bradley Wiggins taking one medal of each colour - the first British Olympian to do this in 40 years. Brailsford gave much of the credit for the team's results to the psychiatrist Steve Peters, who had started working with the squad. From 2004 to 2009, it came top of the medals tally for three out of six UCI Track Cycling World Championships.

The team is noted for its distinctive high performance equipment. From the early days of Keen's tenure, they worked with outside firms to produce more aerodynamic bicycles and bicycle parts. They started using their own Sport Institute bicycles in 2002, and subsequently Chris Boardman played a key role in redesigning equipment and clothing to maximise efficiency. British Cycling continues to work with NASA, McLaren Group and many other organisations to improve track speeds. In the late 2000s, the team consisted of riders as Sir Chris Hoy, Victoria Pendleton, Bradley Wiggins, and Rebecca Romero.

This success has continued in road racing with riders such as Nicole Cooke and Mark Cavendish. British cycling also formed a professional cycling team with BSkyB as the main sponsor and Bradley Wiggins as the team leader and David Brailsford as the manager. In 2012, Bradley Wiggins became the first British cyclist to win the Tour de France. This was followed the next year when Chris Froome won the 2013 Tour de France. Team Sky, later Netcompany-Ineos Cycling Team, is registered as a UCI ProTeam. Recent years have also seen British dominance in downhill mountain biking, in both the Downhill World Cup and Downhill World Championships. In 2014, all three female podium positions, and the top two male positions, in the Downhill World Championships were taken by British athletes.

=== End of Olympic dominance and aftermath ===
At 2024 Olympics Great Britain were knocked off the top of the Cycling Olympic Medal table for the time since the Athens 2004 games having finished with eleven medals total but only two golds as the British team were overhauled by other teams including old rivals Australia and Netherlands. Following the 2024 Olympics it was announced that British-born track cyclist Matthew Richardson, who won three medals whilst representing Australia during the 2024 Olympics would be switching allegiance to the country of his birth and would represent Great Britain in international competition from September 2024 onwards. Richardson won 10 medals in international competition whilst representing his previous country including 3 Olympic medals, 5 World Championship medals (including one gold) and two Commonwealth medals (both of which were gold medals). This announcement drew a frosty response from AusCycling (the cycling governing body of Australia) to the point they confirmed to Australian media that they were actively considering enforcing for a two-year 'non-competition order' on Richardson which would stop Richardson from competing in international competitions for Great Britain until 2026.

== Organisation ==
British Cycling administers road racing, track cycling, cyclo-cross, BMX, mountain biking (including trials riding), cycle speedway, and in Scotland, road time trials. The main exception is road time trials in England and Wales, which are administered by Cycling Time Trials, the current name of the Road Time Trials Council. Only road time-trials in England and Wales remain outside British Cycling, but Cycling Time Trials works with British Cycling to organise the time-trial national championships.

Cycling clubs or teams affiliate to British Cycling to race in British Cycling events. Adult road racing licences are graded by excellence, from fourth and lowest to first and élite. There are licences for under-18s and for women.

British Cycling is a member of the European Cycling Union, the UCI and the British Olympic Association.

=== Sponsorship ===
BSkyB sponsored British Cycling from 2008 to 2016.

HSBC is British Cycling's Lead Partner for the period 2017 to 2024.

== Criticism ==
In 2017, British Cycling faced criticism from UK Sport over alleged bullying, unlawful discrimination and "dysfunctional leadership".

Also in 2017, the Guardian describes how Mark Cavendish and Bradley Wiggins feel as though they have been overlooked by British cycling when they were not selected to compete in the Tokyo Olympics. Wiggins went as far as to say that he felt that British cycling were lacking in 'someone who actually knows what they're talking about'.

The organisation has also been criticised during the "Combatting Doping in Sport inquiry" of the House of Commons, particularly in relation to the supply of fluimucil to Bradley Wiggins in 2011.

In 2019, 22 charges were brought against former British Cycling doctor Richard Freeman by a medical tribunal which include lying to colleagues and the UK Anti-Doping Agency.

In 2022, British Cycling suspended its 'Transgender and Non-Binary Participation policy' to conform with the requirements of the UCI, resulting in transgender cyclist Emily Bridges being ineligible for the British National Madison Championships. The suspension of the policy led to a sponsor of the Women's CiCLE Classic to withdraw in protest.

In September 2022, British Cycling faced widespread ridicule after issuing guidance that following the death of Queen Elizabeth II that cyclists should avoid cycling during the funeral "out of respect"; British Cycling subsequently amended its position after a widespread backlash.

In October 2022, British Cycling faced a barrage of criticism on the announcement that it would be entering into a major partnership with the oil company Shell, with Greenpeace calling it "brazen sportswashing".

== Regional bodies ==
Nation or territory	Regional body
England	no regional governing body
Scotland	Scottish Cycling
Wales	Welsh Cycling
Isle of Man	Isle of Man Cycling Association
Gibraltar	Gibraltar Cycling Association
Jersey	Jersey Cycling Association

In Scotland and Wales, British Cycling operates with regional bodies: Scottish Cycling (Scottish Cyclists' Union) and Welsh Cycling (Welsh Cycling Union). Scotland and Wales run national teams.

There is no regional body for England. England is not recognised as a region by the UCI, and there is no English cycling team outside the Commonwealth Games. For those occasions, British Cycling selects and supports the England team. Cycling is represented on the Isle of Man by the Isle of Man Cycling Association.

Cycling in Northern Ireland is organised under Cycling Ulster, part of the all-Ireland governing body Cycling Ireland. Until 2006, a rival governing body existed, the Northern Ireland Cycling Federation. It was affiliated to British Cycling, causing friction between the British body and the international federation, the UCI.

=== British overseas territories ===
British Cycling represents the cycling associations of British overseas territories in the UCI, if they are not themselves UCI members.

The Gibraltar Cycling Association is the regional governing body for Gibraltar.

== Great Britain Cycling Team Olympic Programmes ==
International performances have improved since British Cycling began receiving National Lottery funding in the late 1990s. It won three golds in the 2002 world track championships and four in 2005. Britain won nine of 18 gold medals at the 2008 world track championships. In September 2004, British Cycling helped organise the Tour of Britain, a five-day race finishing in London.

=== Olympic Podium Programme ===
Riders in this programme are expected to be seasoned world-class performers with a track record of success at the highest level. Athletes are full-time on the programme and generally based near the team's Manchester HQ. Athletes may also be members of professional (trade) teams, receiving additional support from the programme. Athletes on this programme include Olympic champions Jason Kenny, Laura Trott and Philip Hindes as well as Tour de France winner Sir Bradley Wiggins.

=== Olympic Senior Academy ===
Riders aged typically 18 to 23 and exceptional athletes with the clear potential to become world-class performers. The programme aims to add the final technical polish, whilst building up training loads to those likely to be experienced by the senior elite athletes.

=== Olympic Junior Academy ===
Riders aged typically 16 to 18, who are already experienced and focused on a career in professional cycling. The programme aims to add technical experience, including experience of preparing for major (junior) championships, plus conditioning. Athletes are typically still in education and focus on intense training camps, whilst still living at home.

=== Olympic Development Apprentices ===
A regionally based programme aimed at finding talented young riders, typically aged 14–16 and preparing them for transition to the higher programmes.

=== Paralympic Team ===
Athletes competing in four disability categories, primarily in track, road-race and time-trial disciplines.

== Tour de France ==
Britain has hosted stages of the Tour de France on four occasions. The 1974 Tour de France, was not particularly well received. The 1994 Tour de France also visited the UK. Due to the improved popularity of cycling, and the international achievements of British cyclists, the 2007 Tour de France and 2014 Tour de France were deemed to be a tremendous success, the latter being described by race director Christian Prudhomme, as 'the best ever!', over 4.8 million people lined the route, over a three-day period.

== British Cycling Hall of Fame ==
On 17 December 2009, the names of fifty one people to be inducted into the British Cycling Hall of Fame were announced. The newly established hall of fame was created as part of British Cycling's 50th anniversary celebrations. Further names were added in 2014 and 2016

== Research and Development ==
British Cycling has an active Research and Development department for developing track bikes for upcoming Olympic games. Tony Purnell is the current Head of Technology. British Cycling released a radically original design for the 2020 Summer Olympics in Tokyo. The bike itself included a new wheel research by Hope Technology and a collaboration with Lotus Cars permitted British Cycling to adopt an original wide-stay design for the bike's frame and front forks.

British Cycling has also enjoyed notable successes at previous Olympic Games, with some successes attributed to their superior bike designs. This was most notable in the 1992 Summer Olympics, where British Cycling unveiled a design later known as Lotus 108.

== See also ==
- Cycling UK
- Sustrans
