= William Bjergfelt =

British cyclist (born 1978)

Personal information
- Born: 4 December 1978 (age 47) Portishead, Somerset, England

Cycling career
- Sport: Cycling
- Disciplines: Road; Track
- Role: Rider

Professional team
- 2019–2021: SwiftCarbon Pro Cycling
Medal record
Representing United Kingdom
Men's para-cycling
Track World Championships
Silver medal – second place	2019 Apeldoorn	Scratch race C5
Road World Championships
Gold medal – first place	2023 Glasgow	Road race C5

William Bjergfelt (born 4 December 1978) is a British cyclist who competes in road and track events. In para-cycling, he has won a medal in the Track and UCI Para-cycling Road World Championships. He rode for the UCI Continental team SwiftCarbon Pro Cycling.

== Early and personal life ==
William Bjergfelt was born in Portishead, Somerset, England on 4 December 1978. Parallel to his cycling career, he works as an engineer.

== Career ==
Prior to turning to para-cycling, Bjergfelt was active in able-bodied cycling, first in elite mountain bike racing, before switching to road racing. This ended in 2015 when he was injured in a head-on collision that shattered his right leg in to 25 pieces. The bones of this leg were reconstructed using three titanium plates.

At the 2019 UCI Para-cycling Track World Championships in Apeldoorn, Netherlands, Bjergfelt won the silver medal in Men's Scratch Race C5, finishing behind Alistair Donohoe. In 2021, he became the first para-cyclist to compete in the Tour of Britain. After a two-year hiatus, Bjergfelt returned to para-cycling and won his first road race in the World Cup, which took place in the Ostend round. At the 2023 UCI Para-cycling Road World Championships, he won the gold medal in the road race.

In August 2025, Bjergfelt broke the hour record in the C5 classification at Konya Velodrome, becoming the first Para-cyclist in history to pass the 50 km threshold, eventually riding 51.471 km in 60:00:00.
