= Morgan Newberry =

British para-cyclist (born 1999)

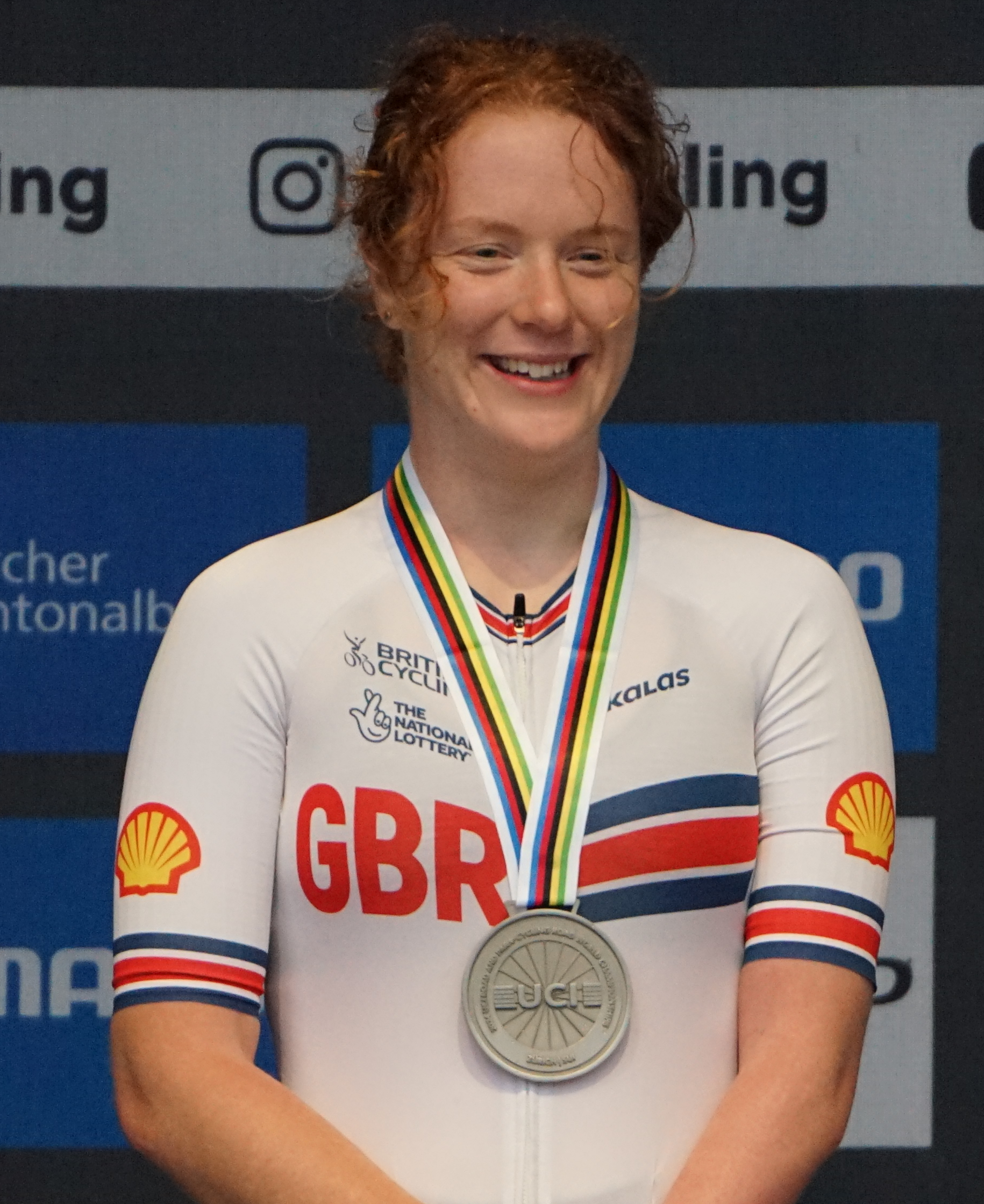
- Newberry at the 2024 World Championships

Personal information
- Nationality: British
- Born: 28 May 1999 (age 27) Leicester

Sport
- Sport: Para-cycling
- Disability: Limb difference
- Disability class: C5
Medal record
Women's para-cycling
Representing Great Britain
Road World Championships
Silver medal – second place	2024 Zurich	Road race C5
Silver medal – second place	2025 Ronse	Time trial C5
Bronze medal – third place	2025 Ronse	Road race C5
Track World Championships
Silver medal – second place	2026 Apeldoorn	Scratch race C5
Representing England
Commonwealth Games
Silver medal – second place	2026 Glasgow	Individual pursuit C4-5

Morgan Newberry (born 28 May 1999) is a British para-cyclist who competes in road and track events.

== Career ==
In 2019, Newberry joined Sarah Storeys' ŠKODA DSI Cycling Academy.

In February 2024, Newberry competed at the 2024 British National Track Championships and won a bronze medal in the individual pursuit C1–5 event.

She helped design a prosthetic arm to aid in balance and stability for riders with below elbow limb differences. She debuted the prosthetic arm at the 2024 UCI Para-cycling Road World Championships in September 2024. During the Road World Championships she won a silver medal in the road race C5 event.

== Personal life ==
Newberry was born with a congenital limb difference in her left arm.
