= Hero Honda Karizma ZMR =

- Manufacturer: Hero Honda (2009–2010); Hero MotoCorp (2011–2020)
- Production: 2009 - 2020
- Predecessor: Hero Honda Karizma; Hero Honda Karizma R
- Successor: Hero Xtreme; Hero Karizma XMR
- Class: Sport-touring motorcycle
- Engine: 223 cc Air-cooled engine, Oil Cooled, four-stroke cycle, single piston, electric start
- Transmission: 5-speed Manual
- Suspension: Front: Telescopic fork, 135 mm travel Rear: Swing arm
- Brakes: Front: 276 mm (Disc brake); Rear:240 mm (Disc brake)
- Tires: Front:2.75*18; Rear:100/90*18
- Wheelbase: 1,350 mm
- Dimensions: L: 2,110 mm W: 805 mm H: 1,175 mm
- Fuel capacity: 15.3 L
- Turning radius: 2,500 mm
- Related: Honda CRF230

The Hero Honda Karizma ZMR is a mid-range semi-faired sports motorcycle manufactured in India, first by a partnership of Hero Honda and later by Hero MotoCorp. The motorcycle was in the market for a long time; beginning with its first launch in 2003 under the Karizma brand, its rebranding in 2007 under the Karizma R brand. Further, the Karizma R brand was a given a cosmetic upgrade in September 2009 resulting in its change in the name to Karizma ZMR. There was minor difference between its engine and that of its predecessor Karizma R. The minor differences lied in the design of fairing, headlights, addition of digital speedometer, rear disc brake, gas charged rear swing-arm suspension and the fuel-injection system instead of the carburettor. In 2014, the ZMR was relaunched with EBR inspired design and the same, but improved engine tuned to deliver more power and torque. In addition, the tail-light design was changed as well as widening of the rear tyre to improve handling following previous critical reviews. It was discontinued in February 2020 due to low sales and being unable to meet BS6 compliance.

== Related bikes ==
- Hero Honda Ambition 135
- Hero Honda Karizma R
- Hero Honda Splendor
- Hero Honda Hunk
- Hero Passion
- Hero Pleasure
- Hero Honda Achiever
- Honda Shine
- Honda Unicorn
- Hero Honda CBZ
- Hero Honda Karizma
- Hero Honda Super Splendor
- Honda Activa
