= Hero Honda Hunk =

- Manufacturer: Hero Honda Motors India Ltd.
- Also called: Hero Hunk
- Parent company: Hero MotoCorp
- Production: 2007-2017 (India) 2011-present (Outside India)
- Class: Standard, Streetfighter
- Engine: 149.2 cc (9.10 cu in), air-cooled single
- Transmission: 5-speed manual constant mesh
- Suspension: Front: telescopic hydraulic shock absorbers Rear: swingarm with nitrox GRS (Gas reservoir suspension)
- Brakes: Front: 240 mm (9.4 in) diameter disc Rear: 220 mm (8.7 in) diameter disc or drum
- Tires: Front 80 / 100 x 18 – 47 P, Tubeless tyres, and rear 100 / 90 X 18 - 56 P, Tubeless tyres
- Wheelbase: 1,325 mm (52.2 in)
- Dimensions: L: 2,080 mm (82 in); W: 765 mm (30.1 in); H: 795 mm (31.3 in)
- Seat height: 795 mm (31.3 in)
- Fuel capacity: 12.4 L (2.7 imp gal; 3.3 US gal)
- Oil capacity: 1.2 L (0.26 imp gal; 0.32 US gal)
- Turning radius: 2.2 m (7.2 ft)

The Hero Honda Hunk is a 150cc motorcycle launched by Hero Honda in October 2007. It is offered in two variants, kick start and self-start. The new 2011 model is offered with either rear disc brake, or rear drum brake.

== Comfort and handling ==
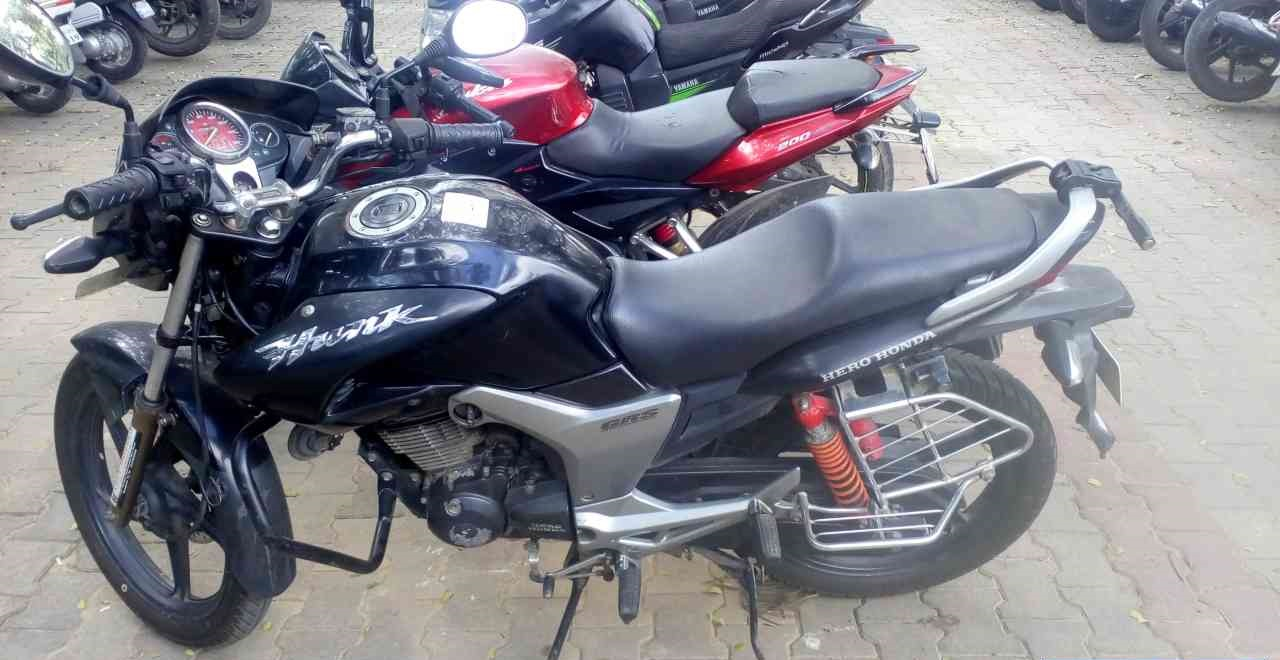
Hero Honda Hunk 2007 model

The Hunk has a stepped seat and rear-set foot pegs that give the rider a sporty stance without sacrificing rider comfort. The vibrations are well controlled. The bike also features gas-charged adjustable rear shock absorbers and rear tire with a tuff-up tube with 100/90-18".

== Performance and fuel economy ==
The Hunk has the 149.2 cc (9.10 cu in) engine used in the Honda Unicorn and the Hero Honda CBZ X-treme, with Advanced Tumble-Flow induction Technology (ATFT) which the company claims will reduce emissions and fuel consumption. The new upgraded Hunk comes with a semi-digital dashboard, ridged exhaust cover with front and rear disc brakes, tubeless tires and contoured visor. After recent cosmetic changes, the bike still retains its single-cylinder, air-cooled 149.2cc engine. Hero Honda Hunk is expected to attain 118kmph at 9500rpm.

== Awards ==
The Hunk has won the NDTV Profit Car India & Bike India Awards Viewers’ Choice Award in the bike category.

== Gallery ==
Racing bull insignia

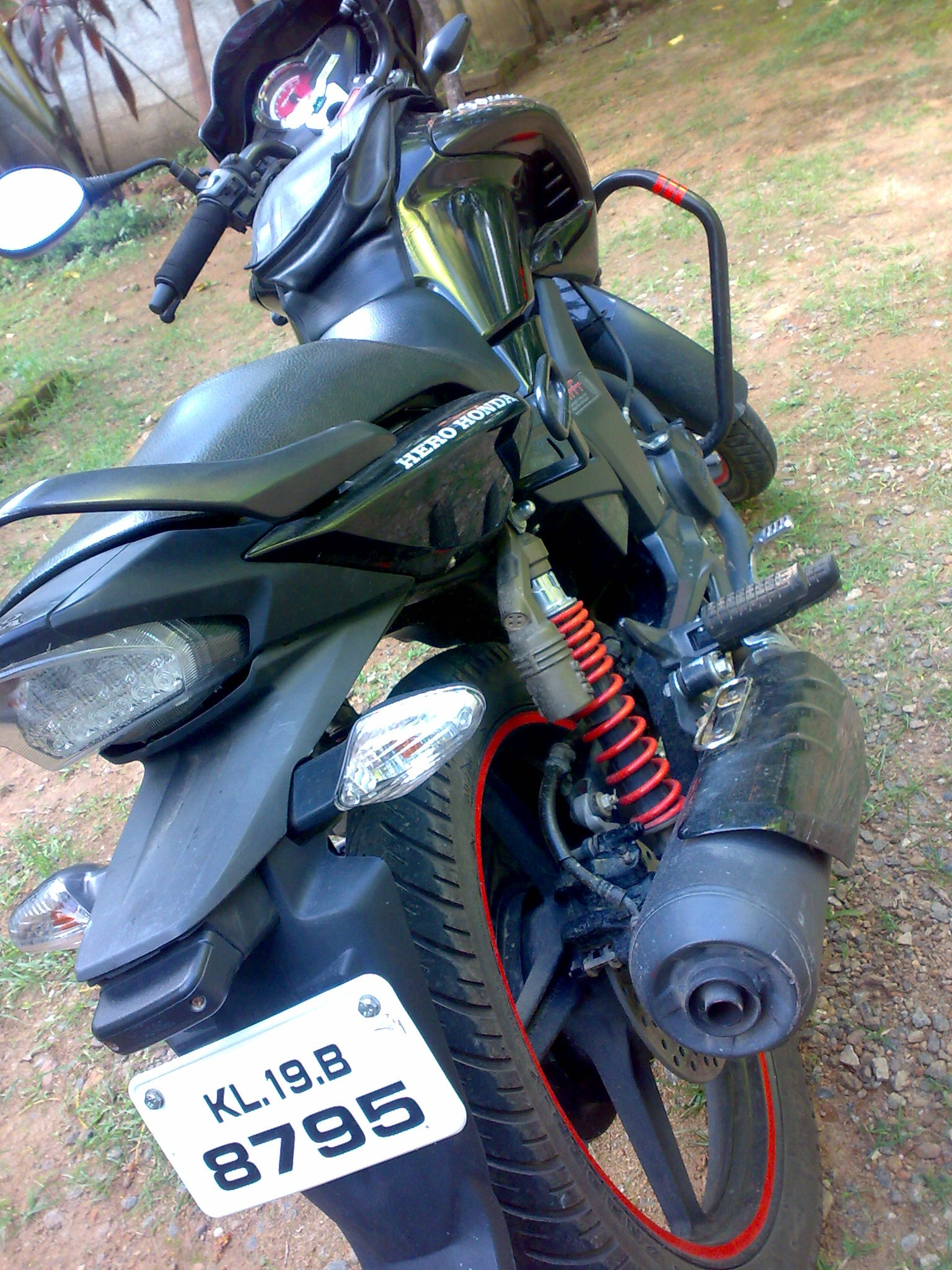
Hero Honda Hunk rear view

== Related bikes ==
- Hero Honda Ambition
- Hero Honda Karizma R
- Hero Splendor
- Hero Honda Super Splendor
- Hero Passion
- Hero Honda Pleasure
- Hero Honda Achiever
- Honda Shine
- Honda Unicorn
- Hero Honda CBZ
- Hero Honda Karizma
- Hero Honda Karizma ZMR
- Honda Activa
