= Hero Honda CBZ Series =

Motorcycle manufactured by Hero Honda

Hero Honda CBZ
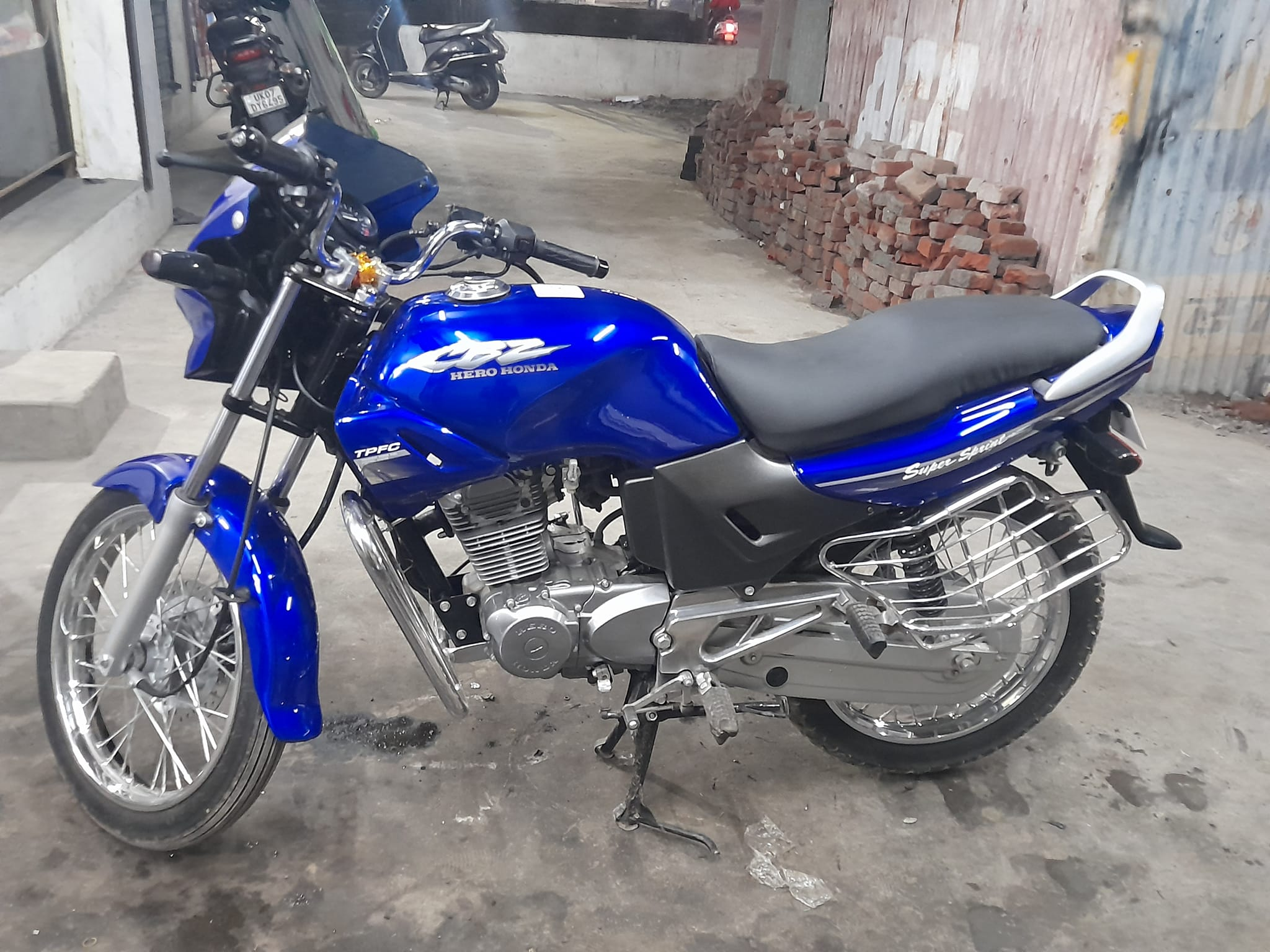
- Manufacturer: Hero Honda
- Parent company: Honda, Japan
- Production: 1999–2004 (Original); 2004-2005 (CBZ Star)
- Successor: Hero Honda CBZ Star
- Class: Commuter Sports, 2-Valve
- Engine: 156.8 cc (9.57 cu in) 4-Stroke OHC Single-cylinder engine
- Bore / stroke: 63.5 mm × 49.5 mm (2.50 in × 1.95 in)
- Compression ratio: 8.5:1
- Top speed: 125Kmph
- Power: 12.8 HP@8000rpm
- Torque: 12.5 Nm@4500rpm
- Ignition type: CDI Ignition System
- Transmission: 5 speed constant mesh, chain
- Frame type: Tubular, Single Cradle Frame
- Suspension: Front: telescopic fork; Rear: swingarm
- Brakes: Front: 240 mm disc; Rear: 130 mm drum
- Tires: Front : 2.75 x 18 – 42 P and Rear : 100 / 90 x 18 – 56 P
- Wheelbase: 1,335 mm (52.6 in)
- Dimensions: L: 2,100 mm (83 in); W: 755 mm (29.7 in); H: 1,130 mm (44 in)
- Seat height: 805 mm (31.7 in)
- Weight: 138 kg (dry)
- Fuel capacity: 12.5 L (2.7 imp gal; 3.3 US gal), 2.5 L (0.55 imp gal; 0.66 US gal) Reserve
- Fuel consumption: 40 Kmpl
- Turning radius: 2.10 m (6 ft 11 in)
- Ground clearance: 160mm

The Hero Honda CBZ is a motorcycle launched in early 1999 by Hero Honda, with an original Honda 156.8cc single-cylinder engine. The styling of the bike was a scaled version of the Honda CB series.

== CBZ ==
The bike was launched as Hero Honda CBZ in India. It was Powered by an Original Honda's 156.8cc.The engine was based on Honda CRF 150F.

== Hero Honda CBZ Star ==
Hero Honda CBZ Star
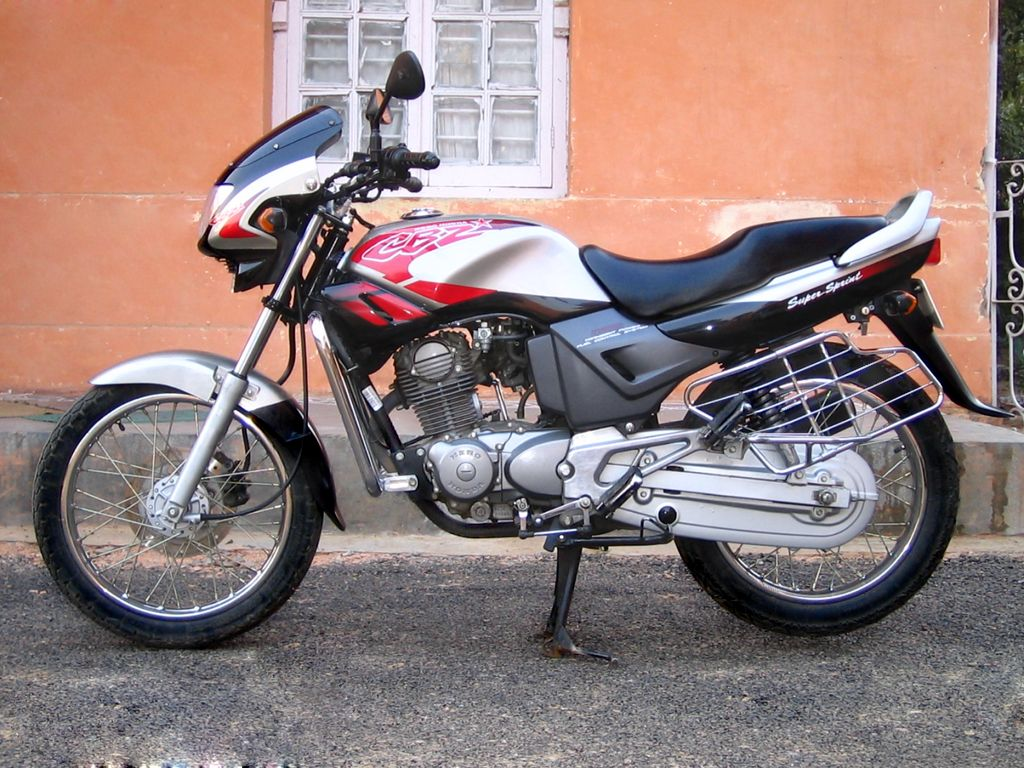
- Manufacturer: Hero Honda
- Parent company: Honda, Japan
- Production: 2004–2005
- Predecessor: Hero Honda CBZ
- Successor: Hero Honda CBZ Xtreme
- Class: Commuter Sports, 2-Valve
- Engine: 156.8 cc (9.57 cu in) 4-Stroke OHC Single-cylinder engine
- Bore / stroke: 63.5 mm × 49.5 mm (2.50 in × 1.95 in)
- Compression ratio: 8.5:1
- Top speed: 113Kmph
- Power: 12.8 HP@8000rpm
- Torque: 12.4 Nm@4500rpm
- Ignition type: CDI Ignition System
- Transmission: 5 speed constant mesh, chain
- Frame type: Tubular, Single Cradle Frame
- Suspension: Front: telescopic fork; Rear: swingarm
- Brakes: Front: 240 mm disc; Rear: 130 mm drum
- Tires: Front : 2.75 x 18 – 42 P and Rear : 100 / 90 x 18 – 56 P
- Wheelbase: 1,335 mm (52.6 in)
- Dimensions: L: 2,100 mm (83 in); W: 755 mm (29.7 in); H: 1,130 mm (44 in)
- Seat height: 805 mm (31.7 in)
- Weight: 142 kg (dry)
- Fuel capacity: 12.5 L (2.7 imp gal; 3.3 US gal), 2.5 L (0.55 imp gal; 0.66 US gal) Reserve
- Fuel consumption: 55Kmpl
- Turning radius: 2.10 m (6 ft 11 in)
- Ground clearance: 160mm

== Hero Honda CBZ Xtreme ==
Hero Honda CBZ Xtreme
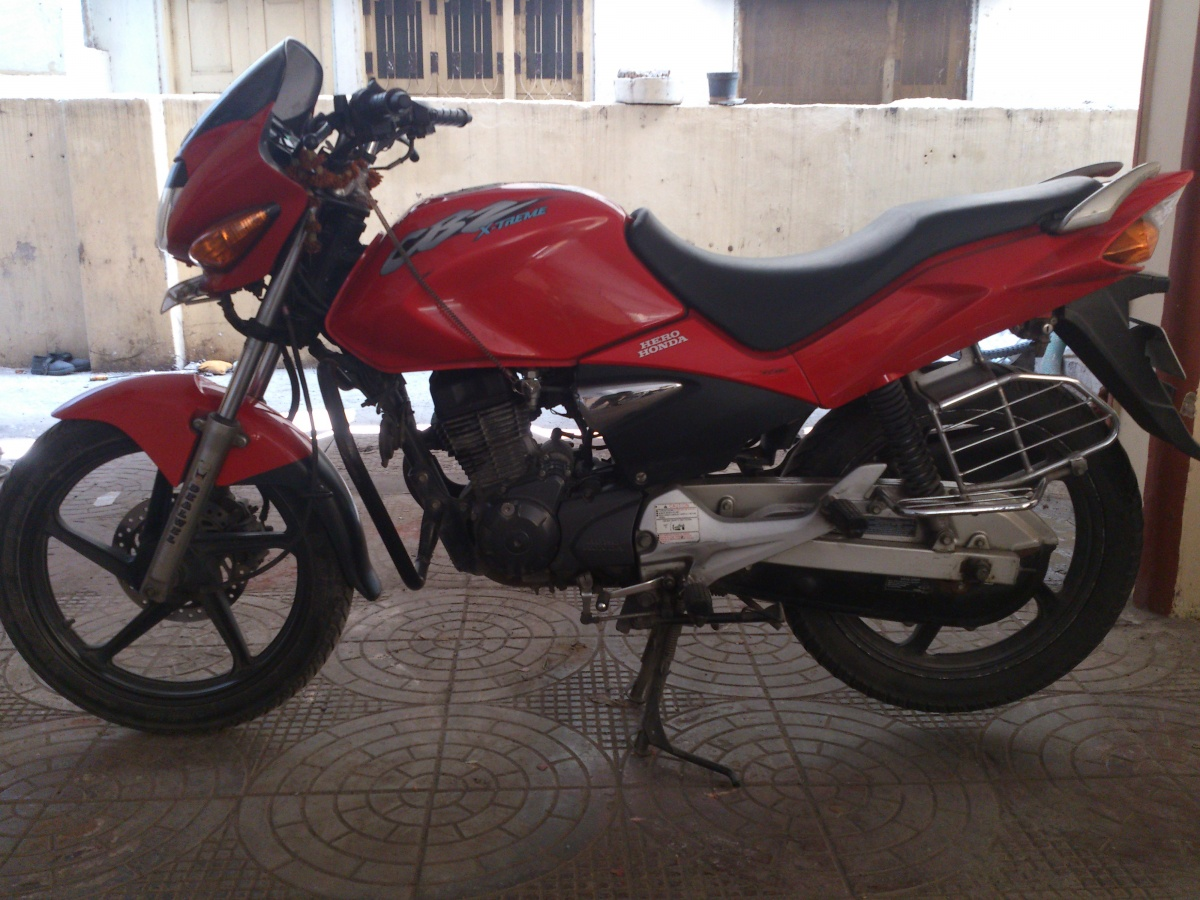
- Manufacturer: Hero Honda
- Parent company: Honda, Japan
- Production: 2006–2011
- Predecessor: Hero Honda CBZ Star
- Successor: Hero Xtreme
- Class: Commuter Sports
- Engine: 149.2 cc (9.10 cu in) 4-Stroke OHC Single-cylinder engine, 2-Valve
- Bore / stroke: 57.3 mm × 57.8 mm (2.26 in × 2.28 in)
- Compression ratio: 9.1:1
- Top speed: 110Kmph
- Power: 14.9 HP@8500rpm
- Torque: 12.8 Nm@6500rpm
- Ignition type: Digital-DC CDI Ignition (AMI) Advanced Microprocessor Ignition
- Transmission: 5 speed constant mesh, chain
- Frame type: Tubular, Single Cradle Frame
- Suspension: Front: telescopic fork; Rear: swingarm
- Brakes: Front: 240 mm disc; Rear: 130 mm drum
- Tires: Front : 2.75 x 18 – 42 P and Rear : 100 / 90 x 18 – 56 P
- Wheelbase: 1,325 mm (52.2 in)
- Dimensions: L: 2,080 mm (82 in); W: 765 mm (30.1 in); H: 1,145 mm (45.1 in)
- Seat height: 795 mm (31.3 in)
- Weight: 141 kg (dry)
- Fuel capacity: 12.3 L (2.7 imp gal; 3.2 US gal), 1.5 L (0.33 imp gal; 0.40 US gal) Reserve
- Fuel consumption: 55 Kmpl
- Turning radius: 2.08 m (6 ft 10 in)

== Transient Power Fuel Control ==
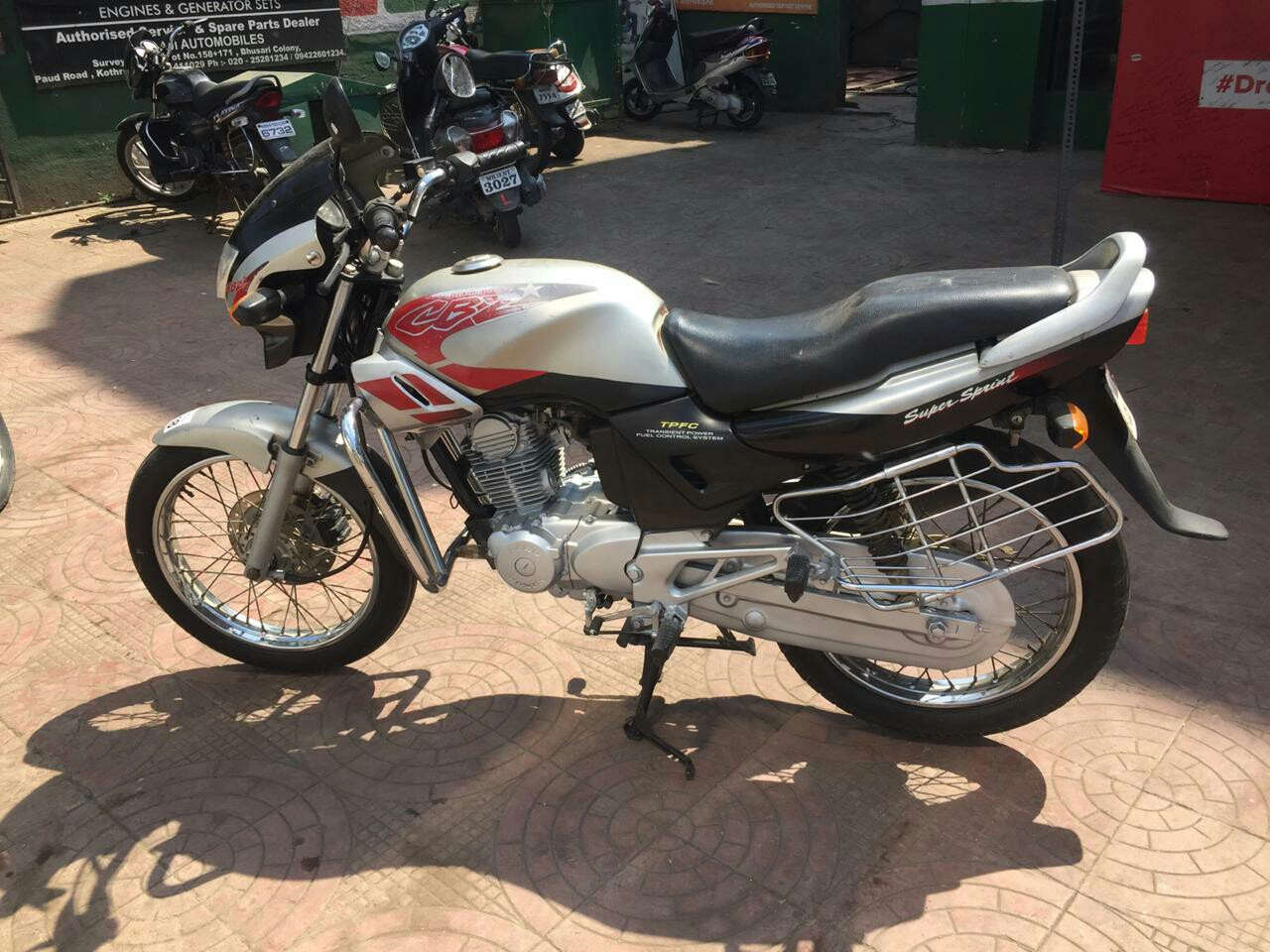
Hero Honda CBZ Star launched in 2004 which replace its previous CBZ Classic model with new graphics and CV Carburetor

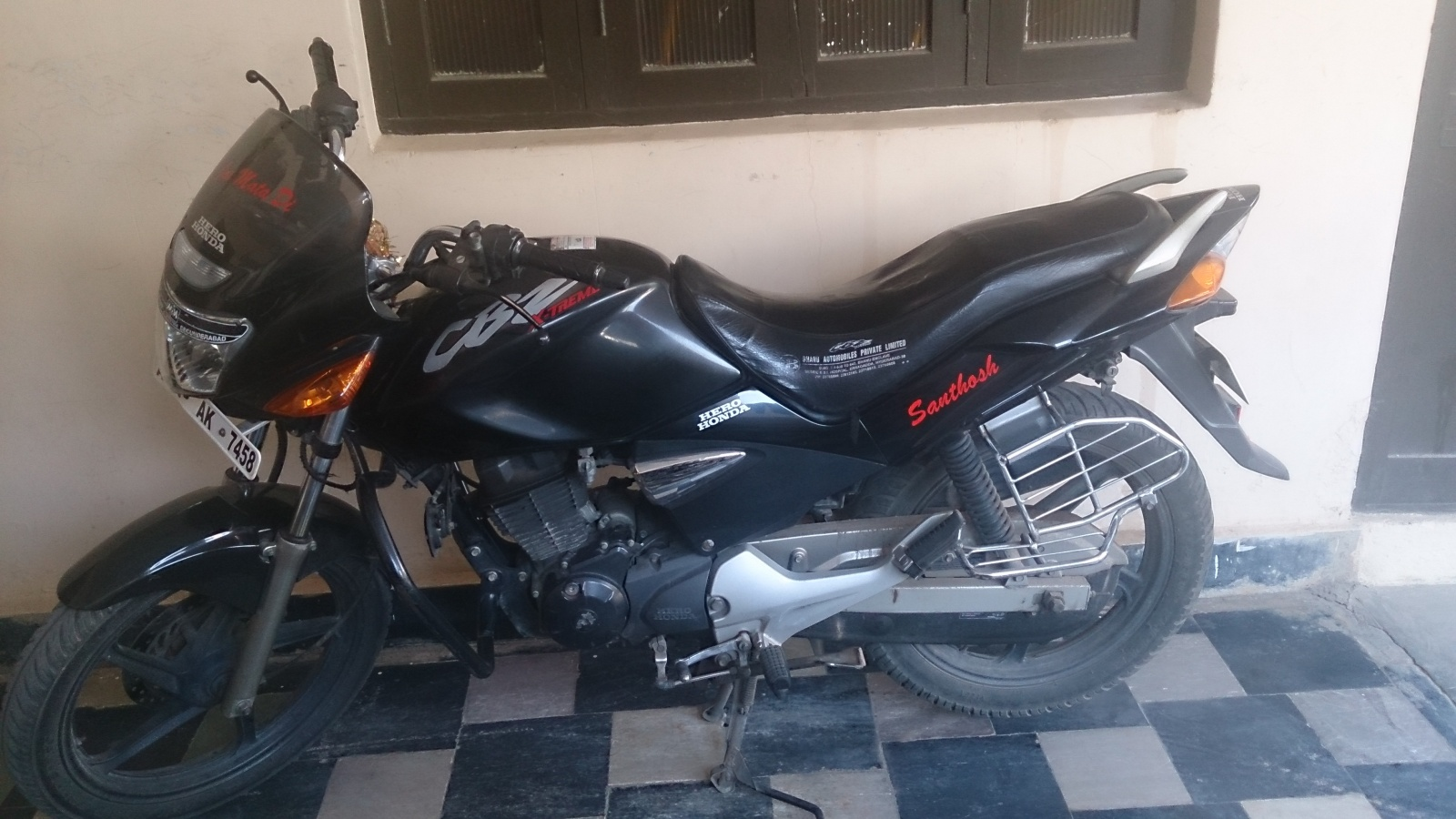
Hero Honda CBZ Xtreme 2006 Model black

== Related bikes ==
- Hero Honda Ambition 135
- Hero Honda Karizma R
- Hero Honda Splendor
- Hero Honda Hunk
- Hero Passion
- Hero Pleasure
- Hero Honda Achiever
- Honda Shine
- Honda Unicorn
- Hero Honda Super Splendor
- Hero Honda Karizma
- Hero Honda Karizma ZMR
- Honda Activa

== Related bikes ==
- Hero Honda Ambition 135
- Hero Honda Karizma R
- Hero Splendor
- Hero Honda Hunk
- Hero Passion
- Hero Pleasure
- Hero Honda Achiever
- Honda Shine
- Honda Unicorn
- Hero Honda Super Splendor
- Hero Honda Karizma
- Hero Honda Karizma ZMR
- Honda Activa
