= Hero Passion =

Hero Honda Passion
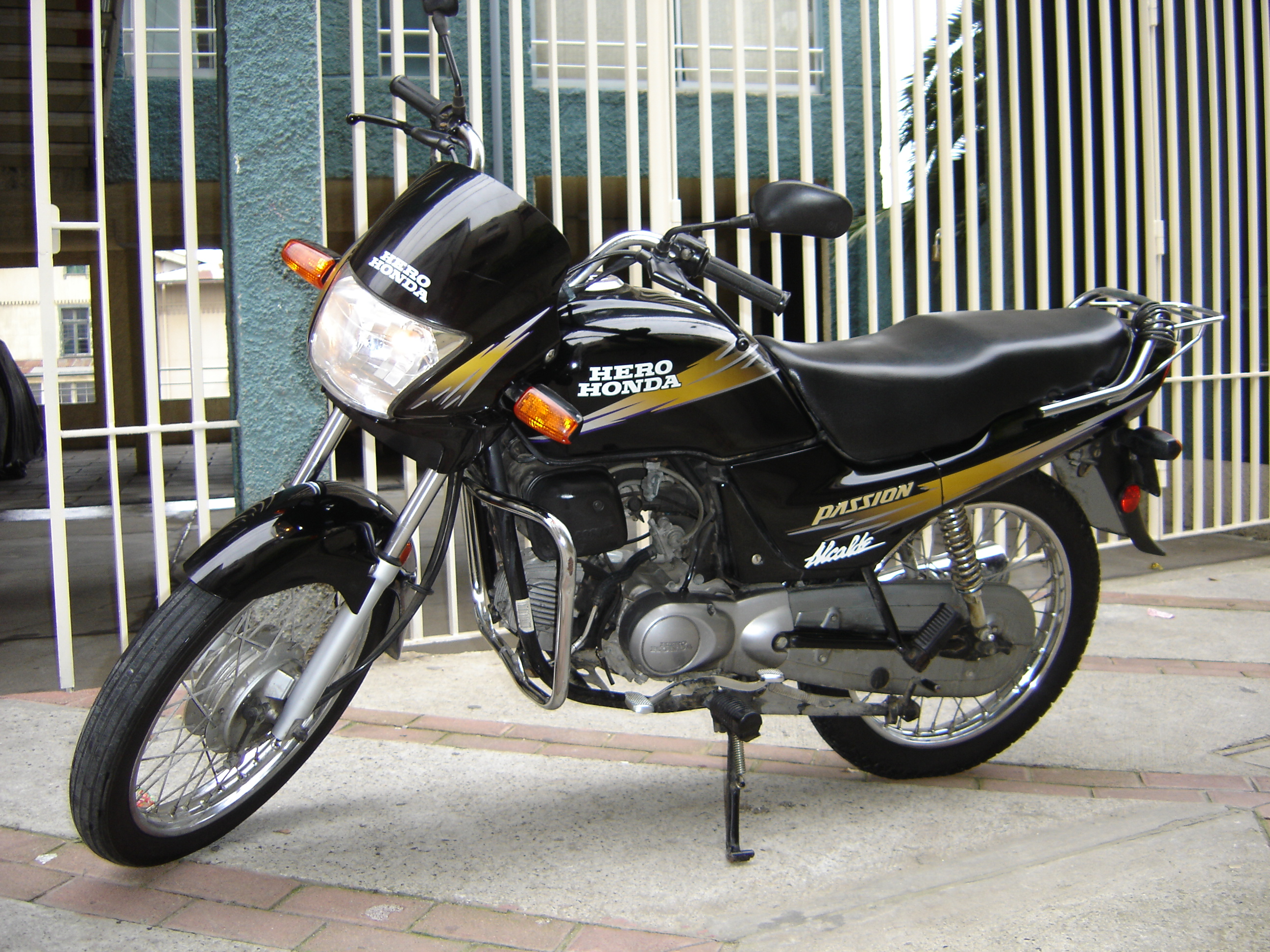
- Manufacturer: Hero Honda (2001–2011); Hero MotoCorp 2011–Present
- Production: 2001–present
- Assembly: India
- Predecessor: Hero Honda Sleek
- Class: Standard
- Engine: 100 cc (6.1 cu in) OHC, air-cooled, 4-stroke, single
- Power: 5.9 Kw or 7.9 ps
- Torque: 8.05 Nm
- Transmission: 4-speed constant mesh manual
- Suspension: Front: telescopic fork Rear: swingarm
- Brakes: Front: drum Rear: drum
- Tires: Front: 2.75 × 18-42P/4PR; Rear: 3.00 × 18-48P/6PR
- Wheelbase: 1,235 mm (48.6 in)
- Dimensions: L: 1,980 mm (78 in); W: 720 mm (28 in); H: 1,060 mm (42 in)
- Fuel capacity: 12.8 L (2.8 imp gal; 3.4 US gal)
- Related: Hero Splendor
- Ground clearance: 159 mm (6.3 in)

The Hero Passion is a motorcycle made in India by Hero Motocorp.

Its graphics and colors were first refreshed in 2003, and it was rechristened as Passion Plus. The graphics were updated again in 2007, featuring black alloy wheels and an all-black engine. In 2008, Hero Honda Passion Plus was renamed Passion Pro, introducing new graphics, new colors, and self-start features. In 2010, the Passion underwent changes to the taillight and instrument console. In 2012, the Passion X Pro was launched, equipped with new alloy wheels and front disc brakes. In 2023, Hero Motocorp relaunched the Passion Plus with the Hero logo, resembling the rear design from 2015. It retains the 97.2cc L1 engine.

It has a 97.2 cc (5.93 cu in) air-cooled, four-stroke single-cylinder engine. The chassis is a tubular double cradle type. Although it is under 100 cc (6.1 cu in), it is marketed as an executive class bike due to its styling and price. A Passion Pro and X Pro 110 were launched in 2018 with 110 cc (6.7 cu in) engine.

== Related bikes ==
- Hero Honda Ambition
- Hero Honda Karizma R
- Hero Splendor
- Hero Honda Hunk
- Hero Honda Super Splendor
- Hero Pleasure
- Hero Honda Achiever
- Hero Honda CBZ
- Hero Honda Karizma
- Hero Honda Karizma ZMR
