= Hero Honda Ambition =

Motorcycle manufactured by Hero Honda

Hero Honda Ambition 135
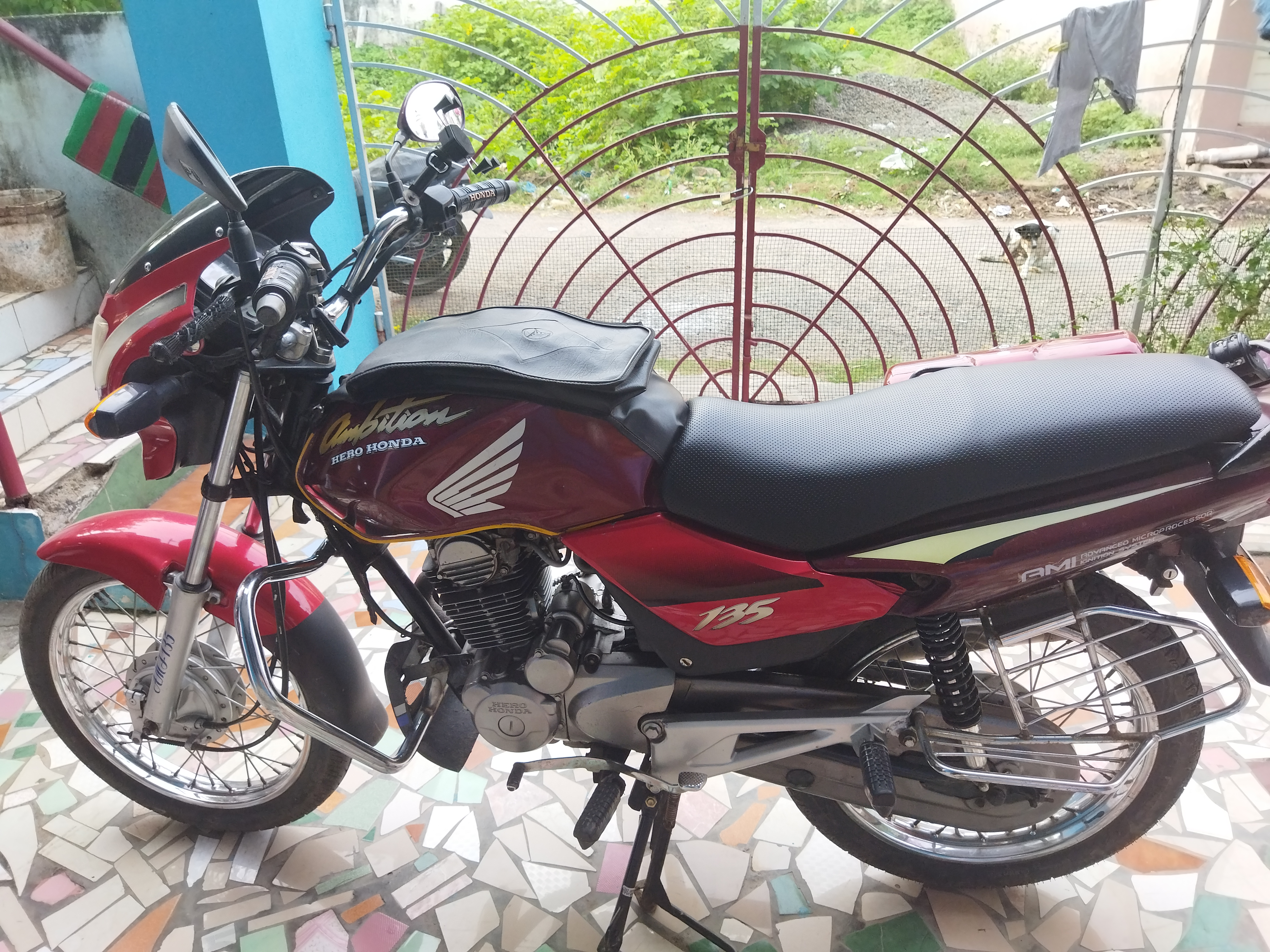
- Manufacturer: Hero Honda
- Production: 2002–2005
- Predecessor: Hero Honda CBZ
- Successor: Hero Honda Achiever
- Class: Commuter
- Engine: 133.3 cc (8.13 cu in) 4-Stroke OHC Single-cylinder engine 2-Valve
- Bore / stroke: 58.5 mm × 49.5 mm (2.30 in × 1.95 in)
- Compression ratio: 9.5:1 Source
- Top speed: 120 KMPH Source
- Power: 11.2 PS @8000 rpmSource
- Torque: 10.5 Nm @6500 rpm Source
- Ignition type: Digital-DC CDI Ignition (AMI) Advanced Microprocessor Ignition System
- Transmission: 5-speed constant mesh, chain
- Frame type: Single cradle, tubular, Diamond type
- Suspension: Front: telescopic fork Rear: swingarm
- Brakes: Front: 240 mm disc Rear: 130 mm drum
- Tires: Front: 2.75 X18 42p - 4PR; Rear: 3.00 X 18 52p - 6PR
- Wheelbase: 1,285 mm (50.6 in)
- Dimensions: L: 2,030 mm (80 in); W: 760 mm (30 in); H: 1,100 mm (43 in)
- Seat height: 798 mm (31.4 in)
- Weight: 136 kg (dry)
- Fuel capacity: 12.5 L (2.7 imp gal; 3.3 US gal), 2.0 L (0.44 imp gal; 0.53 US gal) Reserve
- Fuel consumption: 60 Kmpl Source
- Turning radius: 2.05 m (6 ft 9 in)
- Ground clearance: 150mm

The Hero Honda Ambition is a commuter motorcycle launched by Hero Honda in 2002 with similar engine architecture as the Hero Honda CBZ, with a reduced bore diameter but same stroke. This gave the Ambition a 133.3 cc (8.13 cu in) swept volume single-cylinder engine.

== Description ==
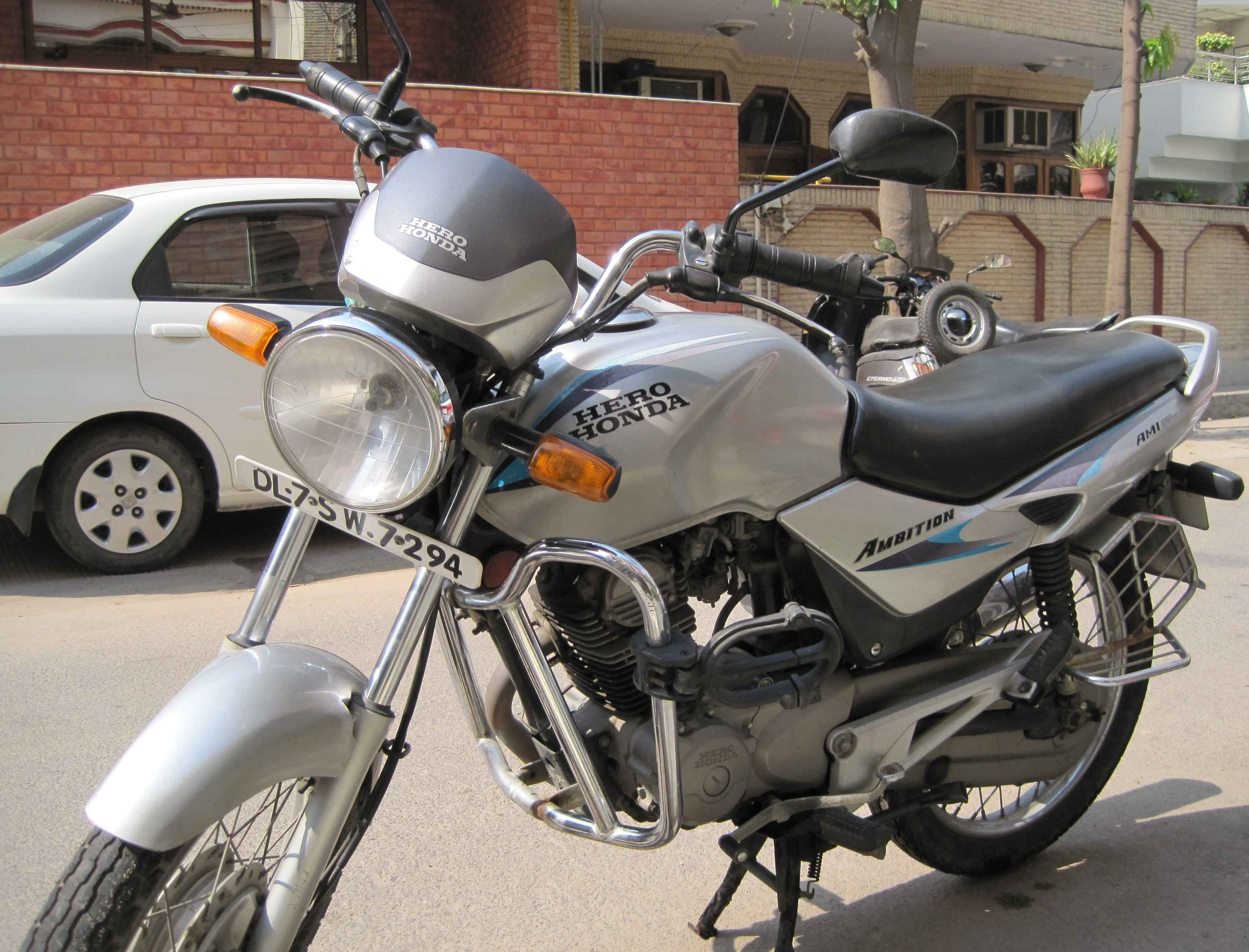
Ambition 2002 Conventional Round Headlamp shape (1st Generation Model)

The Hero Honda Ambition is a first 4-Stroke 135cc bike launched in India by Hero Honda with an Original Honda's 133.3cc over square and overhead camshaft engine with Keihin conventional CV carburetor. The Bike was unveiled in 2002 with a 5-speed constant mesh transmission and comes with self-start as optional. This motor generated 11.2ps of max power and 10.5Nm of peak torque making the bike suitable for city commuting and allowing it to cruise out on the highway at good speeds. Hero Honda marketed the Ambition model as a commuter bike with Hero Honda CBZ original Honda platform engine in 133.3cc capacity. This bike came with CDI Advanced Micro processor ignition technology and was launched to compete with Bajaj Pulsar.

== Hero Honda Ambition 135 ==
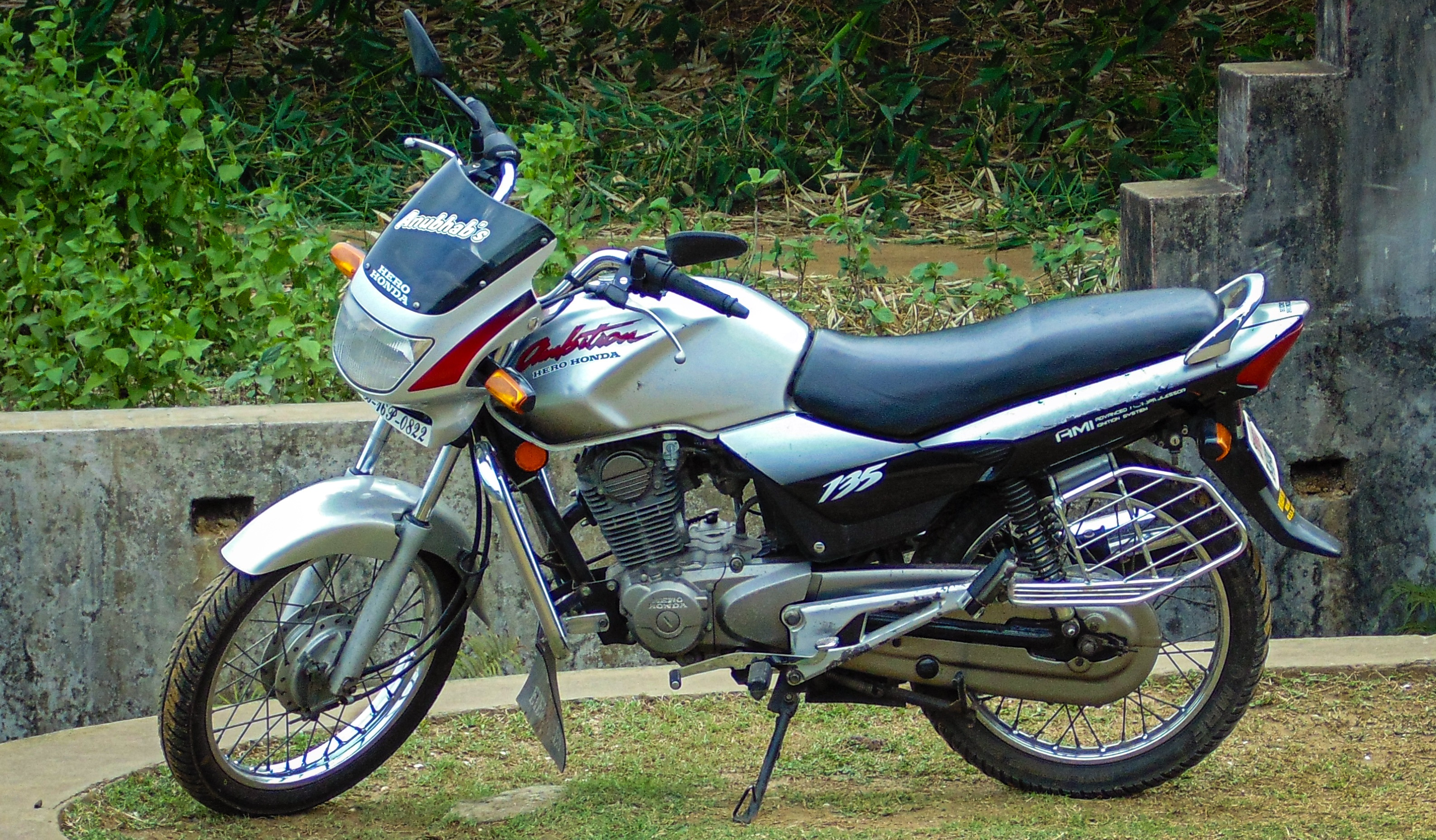
Ambition 135 2004 Facelifted Model (CBZ inspired Front Fairing Model)

The bike was launched to fill the gap between 100cc and 150cc. Instead of launching a 125cc motorcycle, Hero Honda launched something powerful yet fuel efficient. T This Bike equipped with Keihin Conventional CV Carburetor and Complies (Euro 1 or BS1) Bharat stage 1 (Phase 2) emission norms Bharat stage emission standards. The concept of Hero Honda in this motorcycle is it should be more powerful than 125cc motorcycles and more Fuel efficient than 150cc Motorcycles. The fairing of the bike was also scaled from the Hero Honda CBZ, However, the manufacturer failed to sell the expected number of units so the company revised and updated a facelift model in 2004 by changing conventional round headlamp design to the CBZ fairing. Despite this, it failed to sell the expected number of units and the bike was discontinued in 2005. It failed due to its price, which was costlier than its competitors bikes at that time. After this failure, Hero Honda updated the Ambition as an all new Hero Honda Achiever which shared only part of the side and tail panels set with same CBZ Xtreme Engine and Honda Unicorn engine.

== Models list ==
- Hero Honda Ambition (2002–2004) (BS1 Phase 2), This model came with a round headlamp and instrument cluster with 133.3 cc power plant. It comes with two variants: Kick-start model and Self-start model with a front disc of 240mm integrated with Nissin Calipers as optional.
- Hero Honda Ambition 135 (2004–2005) (BS1 Phase 2), This is a facelifted model which came with upgraded front visor and instrument cluster inspired by Hero Honda CBZ.

== Advanced Micro Processor Ignition System ==
The Advanced Micro Processor Ignition System works in tandem with sensors connected to the throttle cable, controlling the fuel flow and throttle response of the motorcycle. This system electronically enhances the bike's spark. The Ambition was the first motorcycle from Hero Honda to feature the Advanced Micro Processor Ignition System (AMI). This system plays a significant role in delivering improved power and acceleration while also enhancing fuel efficiency. Following the Ambition model, Hero Honda equipped all its 150cc to 200cc motorcycles with this technology to provide better efficiency and pickup with reduced fuel consumption, as claimed by the company.

== See also ==
- Hero Honda CBZ
- Hero Honda Karizma
- Hero Honda Karizma R
- Hero Honda Karizma ZMR
- Hero Honda Achiever
- Hero Honda Splendor
- Hero Honda Passion
- Hero Honda Super Splendor
- Hero Honda Hunk
- Honda Unicorn
- Honda Shine
- Hero Pleasure
- Honda Activa
