= Hero Ignitor =

Ignitor
- maxresdefault.jpg Ignitor bike
- Manufacturer: Hero MotoCorp
- Class: Standard
- Engine: Type Air Cooled, 4 - Stroke Single Cylinder OHC Displacement 124.7 cc Max. Power 8.2 KW (11.1 Ps) @ 8000 rpm Max. Torque 11 Nm @ 5000 rpm Max. Speed 95 Kmph Bore x Stroke 52.4 x 57.8 mm Carburettor CV Type Compression Ratio 9.2:1 Starting Self Start / Kick Start Ignition Digital CDI Oil Grade SAE 10W30 SJ, JASO MA Grade Air Filtration Viscous, Paper Pleated Type Fuel System Carburetor Fuel Metering Carburetion
- Transmission: Clutch Multiplate Wet Gear box 5 Speed Constant Mesh Chassis Type Tubular, Diamond Type
- Suspension: Front Telescopic Hydraulic Shock absorbers Rear Swing Arm with Adjustable Hydraulic Shock Absorbers
- Brakes: Front Brake Disc Dia 240 mm Disc - Non Asbestos Type Front Brake Drum Internal expanding shoe type ( 130 mm ) - Non Asbestos type Rear Brake Drum Internal expanding shoe type ( 130 mm ) - Non Asbestos type
- Tires: Tyre Size Front 80/100 x 17 - M/C 46 P (Tubeless tyres) Tyre Size Rear 100/90 x 17 - M/C (Tubeless tyres)
- Wheelbase: 1270 mm
- Dimensions: L: 2010 mm W: 710mm H: 1095mm
- Fuel capacity: 9.9L

Hero Ignitor is a 125cc Naked motorcycle from Hero MotoCorp of India. It is a half fairing motorcycle.
