= Hero Honda Split =

A joint venture between the Hero Group and Honda Motor Company was established in 1984 as the Hero Honda Motors Limited At Dharuhera India. Hero is the brand name used by the Munjal brothers for their flagship company Hero Cycles Ltd. Munjal family and Honda group both own 26% stake in the Company. However the Hero Honda group split in the end of 2010. After the split the Munjal family bought Honda Motor’s 26% stake for around $1 billion.

The Japanese auto major will exit the JV through a series of offmarket transactions by giving the Munjal family—that currently holds 26% stake in the company—an additional 26%. Honda, which also has an independent fully owned twowheeler subsidiary—Honda Motorcycle and Scooter India (HMSI)—will exit Hero Honda at a discount and get over $1 billion for its stake. The discount will be between 30% and 50% to the current value of Honda's stake as per the price of the stock after the market closed on Wednesday.

The Munjal family plans to compensate Honda through high royalty payouts, which could double to nearly 6% of net sales. However, key financial institutions have objected to this move, saying that the deal could favour the Munjals but be detrimental to other shareholders.

== Difference ==
The rising differences between the two partners gradually emerged as an irritant. Differences had been brewing for a few years before the split over a variety of issues, ranging from Honda's reluctance to fully and freely share technology with Hero (despite a 10-year technology tie-up that expires in 2014) as well as Indian partner's uneasiness over high royalty payouts to the Japanese company. Another major irritant for Honda was the refusal of Hero Honda (mainly managed by the Munjal family) to merge the company's spare parts business with Honda's new fully owned subsidiary Honda Motorcycle and Scooter India (HMSI).

== Arrangement ==
As per the arrangement, it will be a two-leg deal. In the first part, the Munjal family, led by Brijmohan Lal Munjal group, will form an overseas-incorporated special purpose vehicle (SPV) to buy out Honda's entire stake, which will be backed by bridge loans. This SPV would eventually be thrown open for private equity participation and those in the fray include Warburg Pincus, Kohlberg Kravis Roberts (KKR), TPG, Bain Capital, and Carlyle Group.

== Future of the Joint ==
Honda will continue to provide technology to Hero Honda motorbikes until 2014 for existing as well as future models.
