= Hero Maestro =

Scooter by Hero Motocorp

- Manufacturer: Hero MotoCorp
- Production: 2012–2017
- Successor: Maestro Edge
- Class: Scooter
- Engine: 109 cc (6.7 cu in), 125 cc (7.6 cu in), air-cooled, 4-stroke OHC, single
- Suspension: Front: bottom link with spring-loaded hydraulic dampers Rear: swingarm with spring-loaded hydraulic dampers
- Brakes: Drum; internal expanding shoe type (130mm) (combined braking system)
- Tires: 90 / 100 x 10 - 53 J (tube with puncture endurance)
- Fuel capacity: 5.3 L (1.2 imp gal; 1.4 US gal)
- Related: Hero Pleasure

The Hero Maestro is a scooter from Hero MotoCorp. It comes as the second scooter from what was traditionally a motorcycle company. The scooter was unveiled at The O2 Arena in London along with Hero's new corporate identity in 2011, and was launched in the market in 2012. Later, Hero Motocorp started to upgrade the vehicle and started releasing it as Hero Maestro Edge and Hero Maestro Edge 125.

== Engine ==
The Maestro is powered by a 109 cc (6.7 cu in) engine, and has a dry clutch with variomatic drive.
