= Rockman Industries =

Indian auto components manufacturer

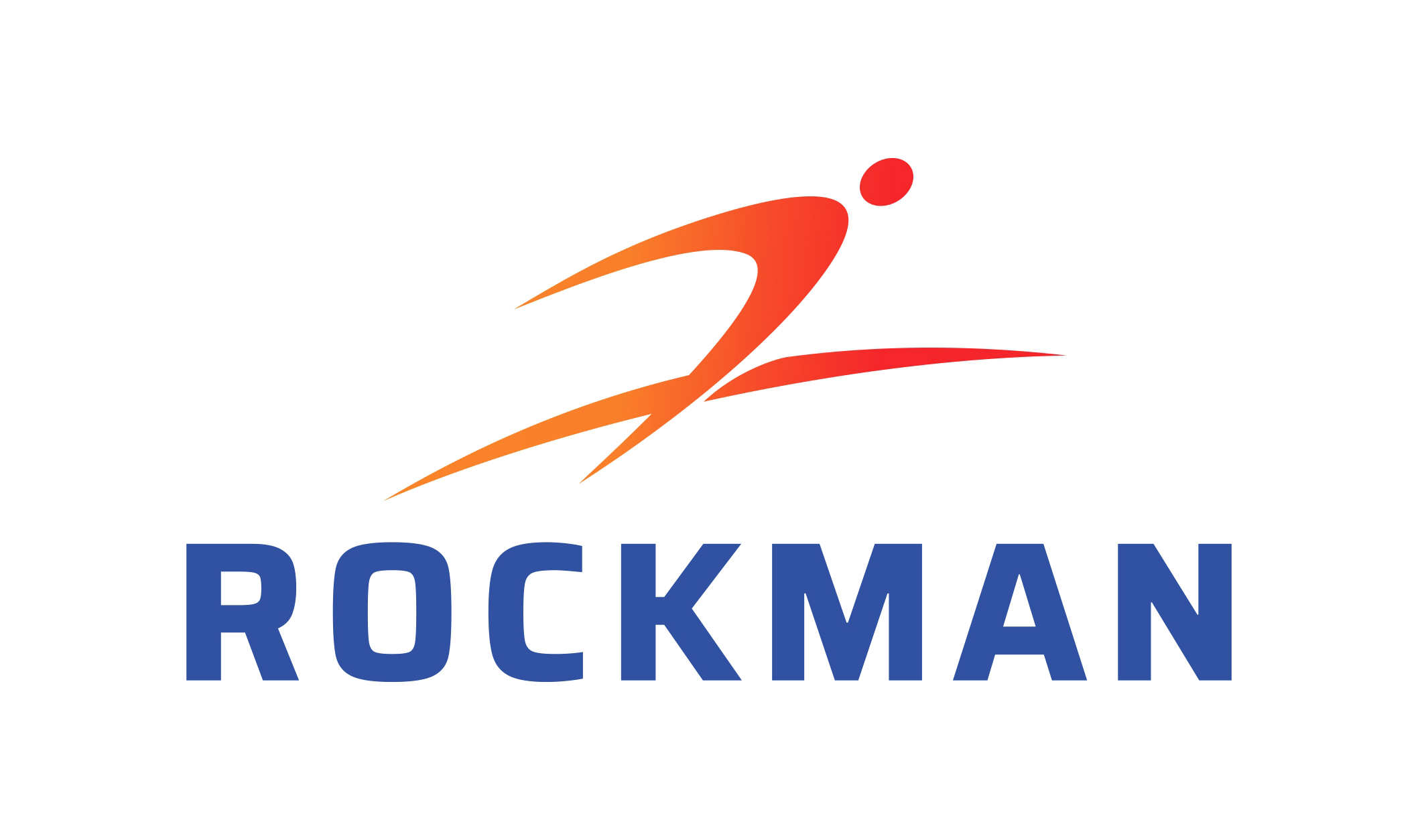
- Formerly: Rockman Cycles Limited
- Industry: auto components manufacturing
- Founded: 1960
- Headquarters: New Delhi, India
- Key people: Suman Kant Munjal (Chairman); Ujjwal Munjal (Managing Director)
- Products: Aluminum die casting components; Machined and painted assemblies; Auto chains and parts; Carbon composites
- Website: www.rockman.in

Rockman Industries, formerly Rockman Cycles limited, is an Indian auto components manufacturer, based in New Delhi, India. The company is one of India's largest auto component manufacturers. Rockman Industries is primarily engaged in the manufacturing of aluminum die casting components, machined and painted assemblies, auto chains and parts. In January 2017, Rockman Industries entered the carbon composites sector with the acquisition of Moldex Composites, a UK-India carbon composite design and manufacturing company. Rockman was founded in 1960 and is led by Suman Kant Munjal, Chairman and Ujjwal Munjal, Managing Director.

== History ==
A part of the Hero Group, Rockman Industries (formerly Rockman Cycles limited.) was set up in 1960 and started to manufacture bicycle chains and hubs for Hero Cycles. In 1999, it diversified into high pressure aluminium die cast components and automotive chains for Hero MotoCorp (Erstwhile Hero Honda). In 2005 it closed the bicycle chains and hubs business and from November 2005, is only manufacturing die casting components and auto parts. In 2008, Rockman Industries set up a new auto components plant in Uttaranchal. In February 2014, Rockman Industries acquired Sargam Die Casting company and started its new facility at Bawal (Haryana). In January 2017, Rockman Industries acquired a majority stake in Moldex Composites to enter the aerospace, motorsport and high-end auto component manufacturing space. In 2019, company inaugurated two new plants at Vadodara and Tirupati. In Tirupati plant company is manufacturing four wheeler alloy wheels.

== Manufacturing units ==
Rockman Industries has eight manufacturing plants at Ludhiana, Haridwar, Chennai, Bawal, Surat, Vadodara and Tirupati. In Ludhiana they have two plants, one for chains and the other for aluminium die casting products. All other locations manufacture die casting components. Surat's unit is manufacturing advanced composites parts.

== Customers ==
Rockman Industries supplies its products to Hero MotoCorp and various global automotive companies including: TVS, Honda, Royal Enfield, Revolt, Ather, Hyundai, Kia, Ford Motor, Mahindra, Tata, Bosch, Stanadyne, Dana, Denso, Nemak, PSA AVTEC, KSP Automotive, Continental, Magna, Hanon System, Wabco, Mando, Getrag, BorgWarner, iwis and others.
