= Hero MotoCorp =

Indian two-wheeler manufacturing company pvt ltd

Hero MotoCorp Limited
- Formerly: Hero Honda (1984–2010)
- Type: Public
- Traded as: BSE: 500182; NSE: HEROMOTOCO
- ISIN: INE158A01026
- Industry: Automotive
- Founded: 19 January 1984; 42 years ago
- Founder: Brijmohan Lall Munjal
- Headquarters: New Delhi, India
- Key people: Pawan Munjal (executive chairman)
- Products: Motorcycles; Scooters
- Production output: ▲7,587,130 units (2018)
- Revenue: ▲₹41,967 crore (US$4.5 billion) (FY2025)
- Operating income: ▲₹6,095 crore (US$650 million) (FY2025)
- Net income: ▲₹4,375 crore (US$470 million) (FY2025)
- Total assets: ▲₹28,390 crore (US$3.0 billion) (FY2025)
- Total equity: ▲₹19,404 crore (US$2.1 billion) (FY2025)
- Number of employees: 8,599 (2020)
- Subsidiaries: Vida
- Website: www.heromotocorp.com
- Footnotes; Financials as of 31 March 2025.

Hero MotoCorp Limited is an Indian multinational motorcycle and scooter manufacturer headquartered in Delhi. As of March 2024, it has a market share of about 30% in the Indian two-wheeler industry. The Munjal family, with its 34.75% stake, is the biggest shareholder in the company as of 2024.

== History ==
Hero Honda started its operations in 1984 as a joint venture between Hero Cycles of India and Honda of Japan. "Hero" is the brand name used by the Munjal brothers for their flagship company, Hero Cycles Ltd. A joint venture between the Hero Group and Honda Motor Company was established in 1984 as the Hero Honda Motors Limited at Dharuhera, India. Munjal family and the Honda group both owned a 26% stake in the company.

During the 1980s, the company introduced low cost motorcycles in India. It was noted for its advertising campaign based on the slogan 'Fill it – Shut it – Forget it', emphasising fuel efficiency. In 2001, the company became the largest two-wheeler manufacturing company in India.

=== Termination of Honda joint venture and the renaming ===
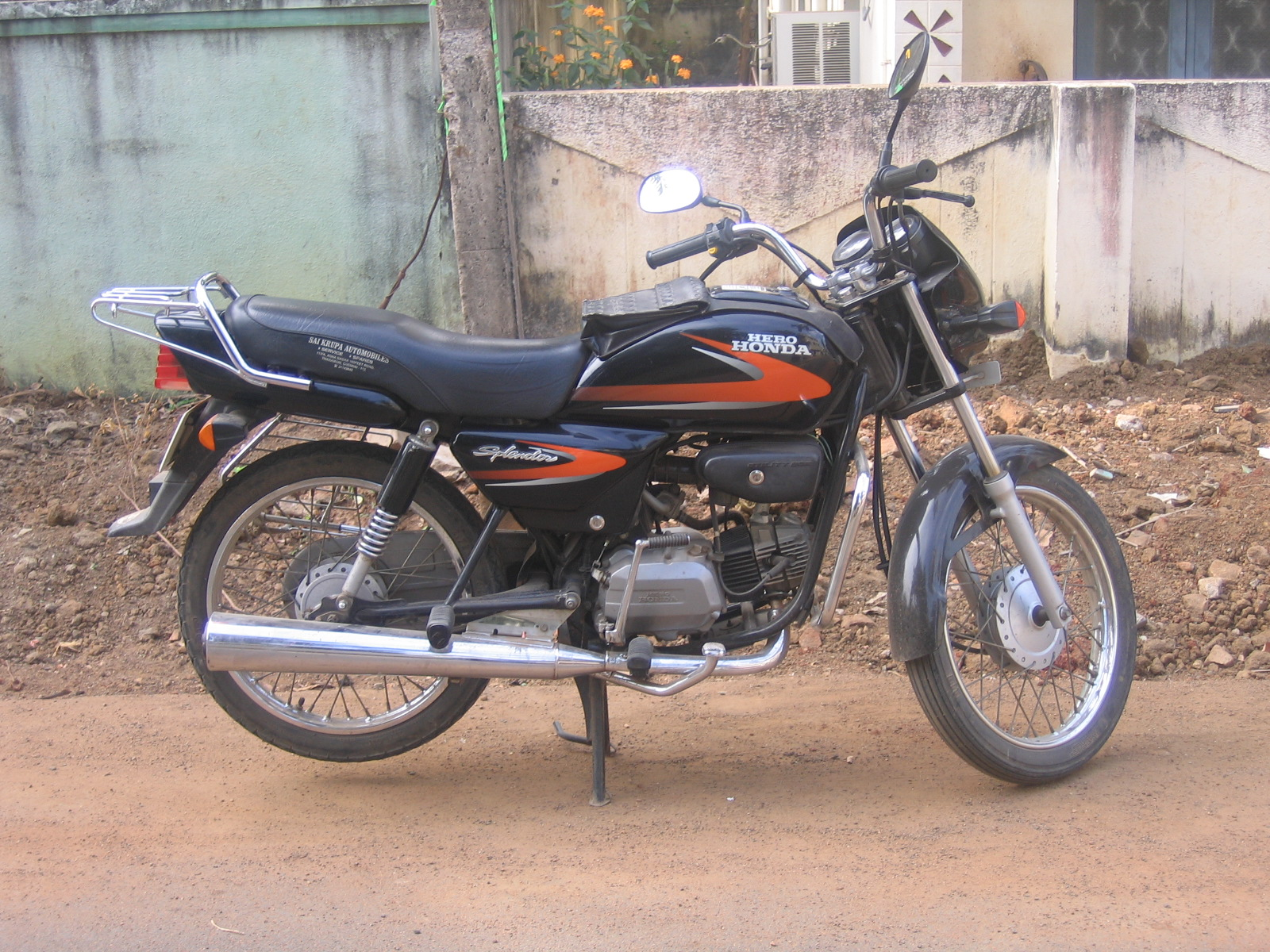
Hero Honda Splendor, first model

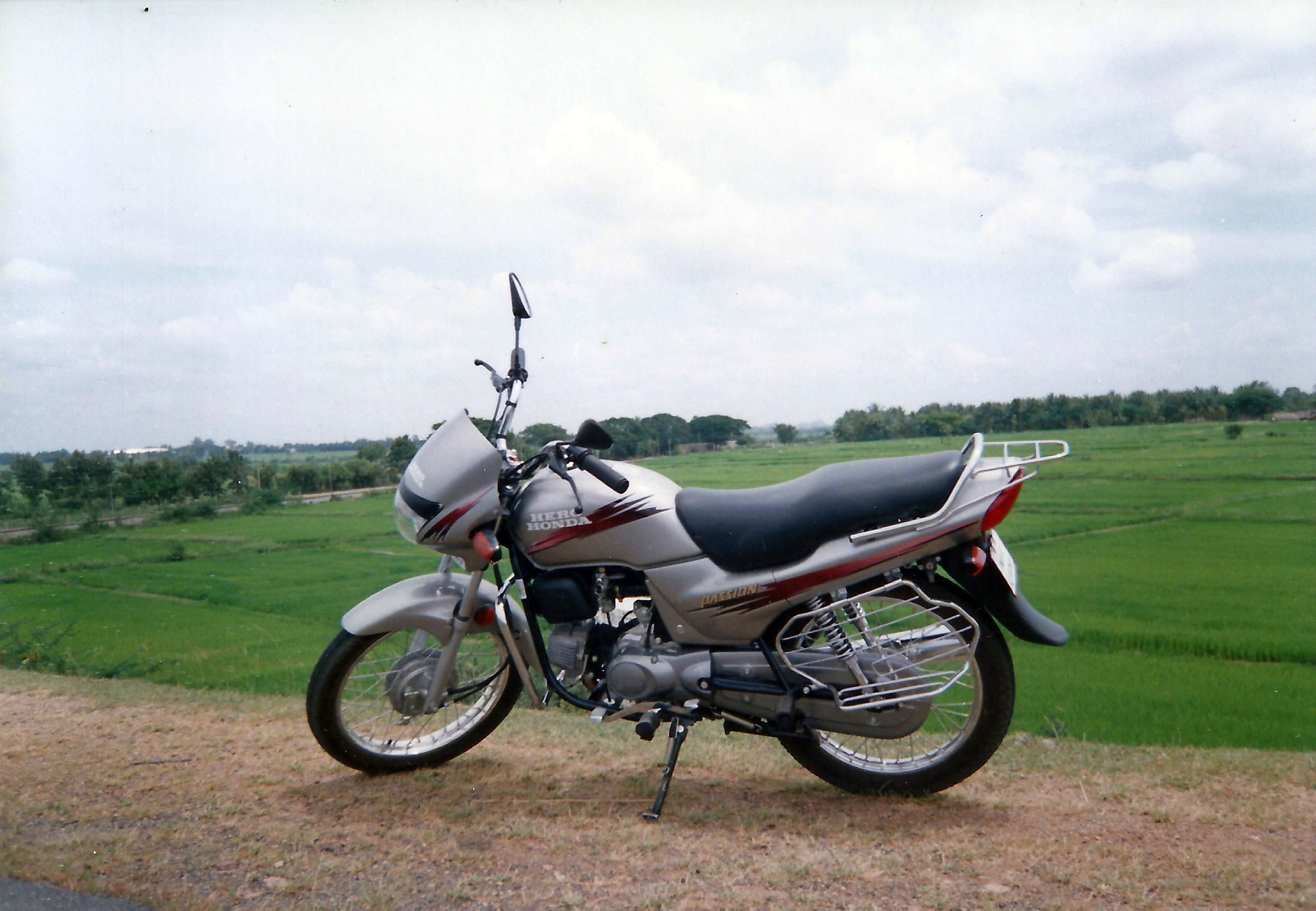
Hero Honda Passion

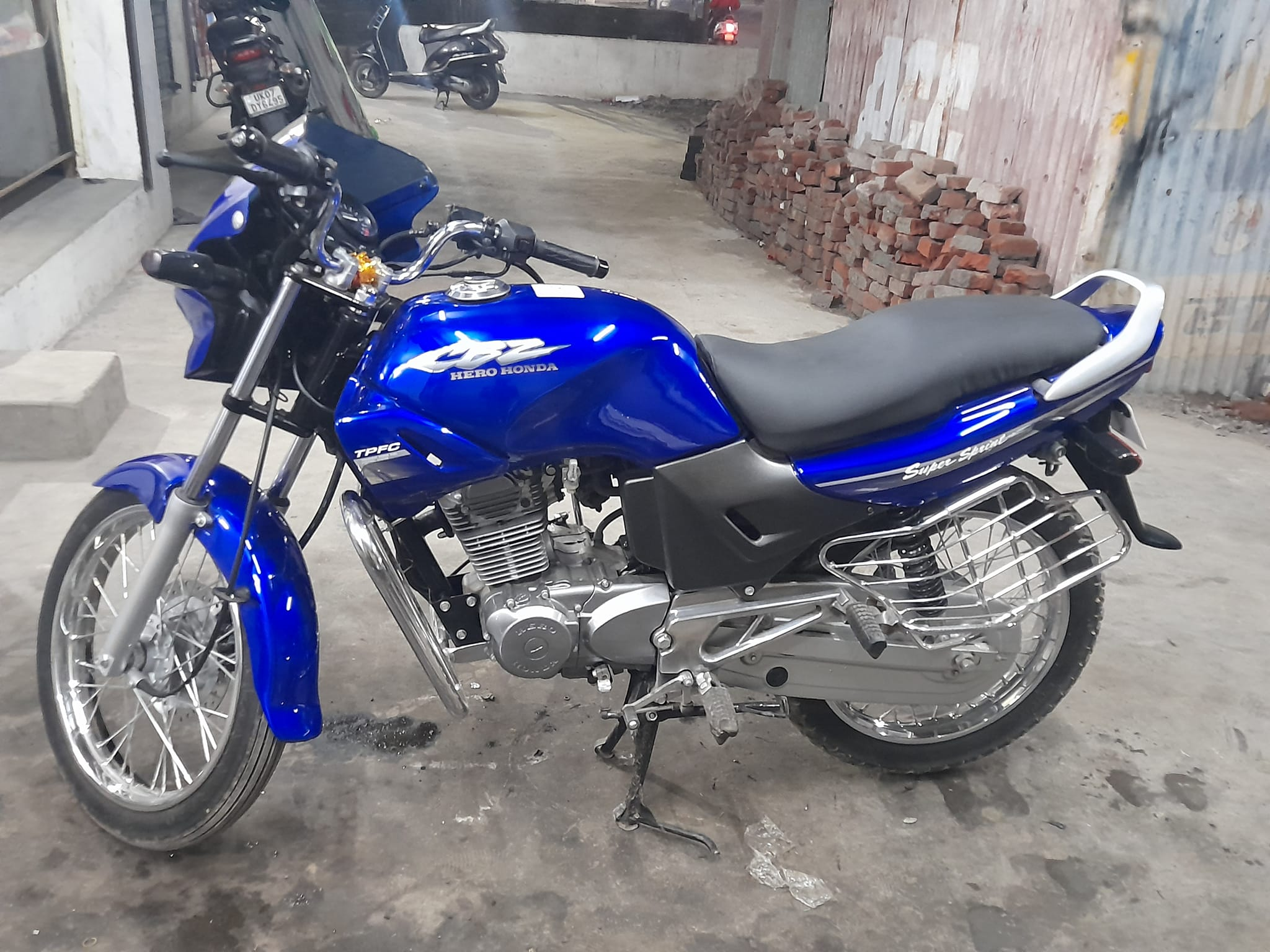
Hero Honda CBZ

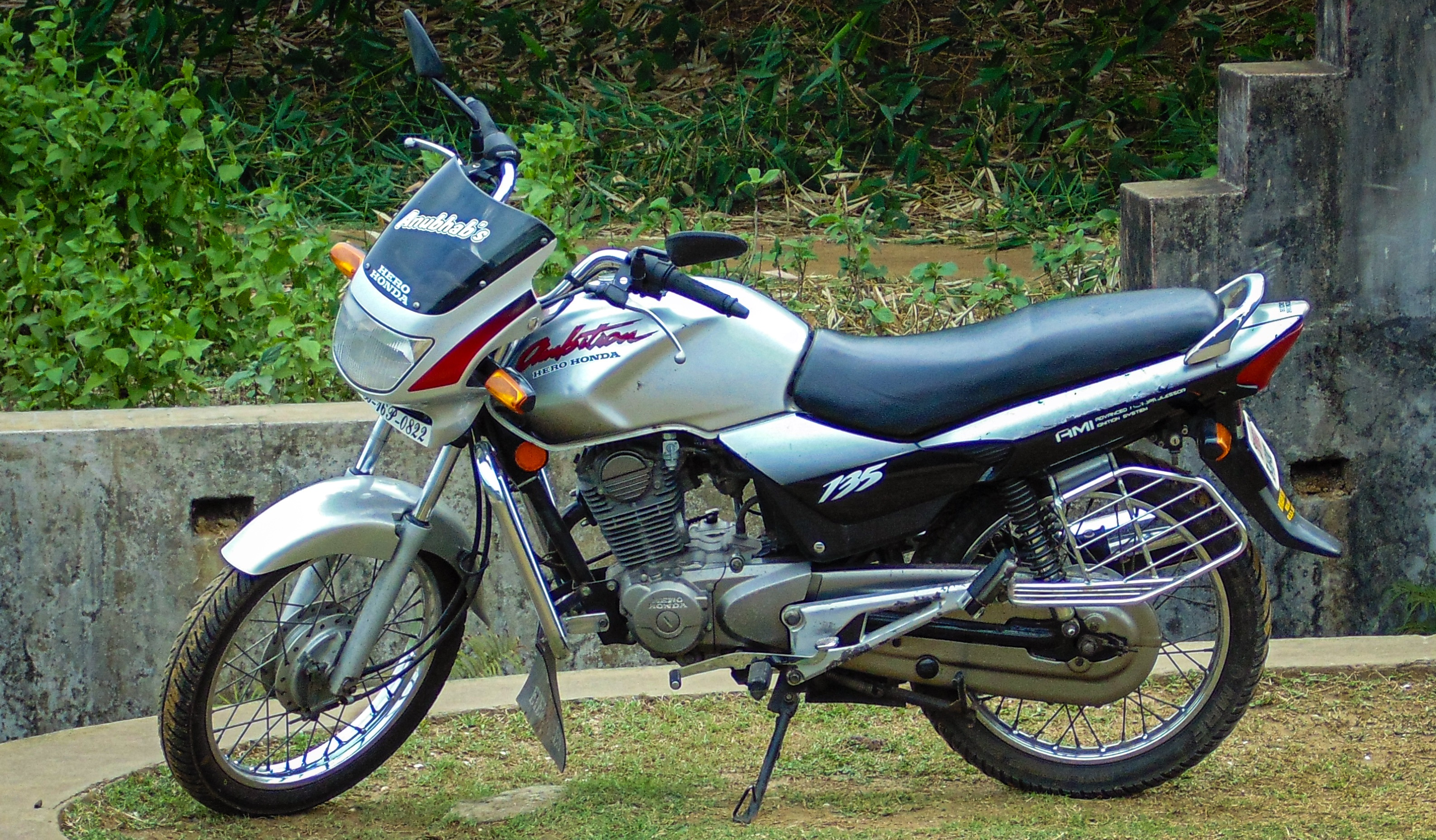
Hero Honda Ambition 135 2004

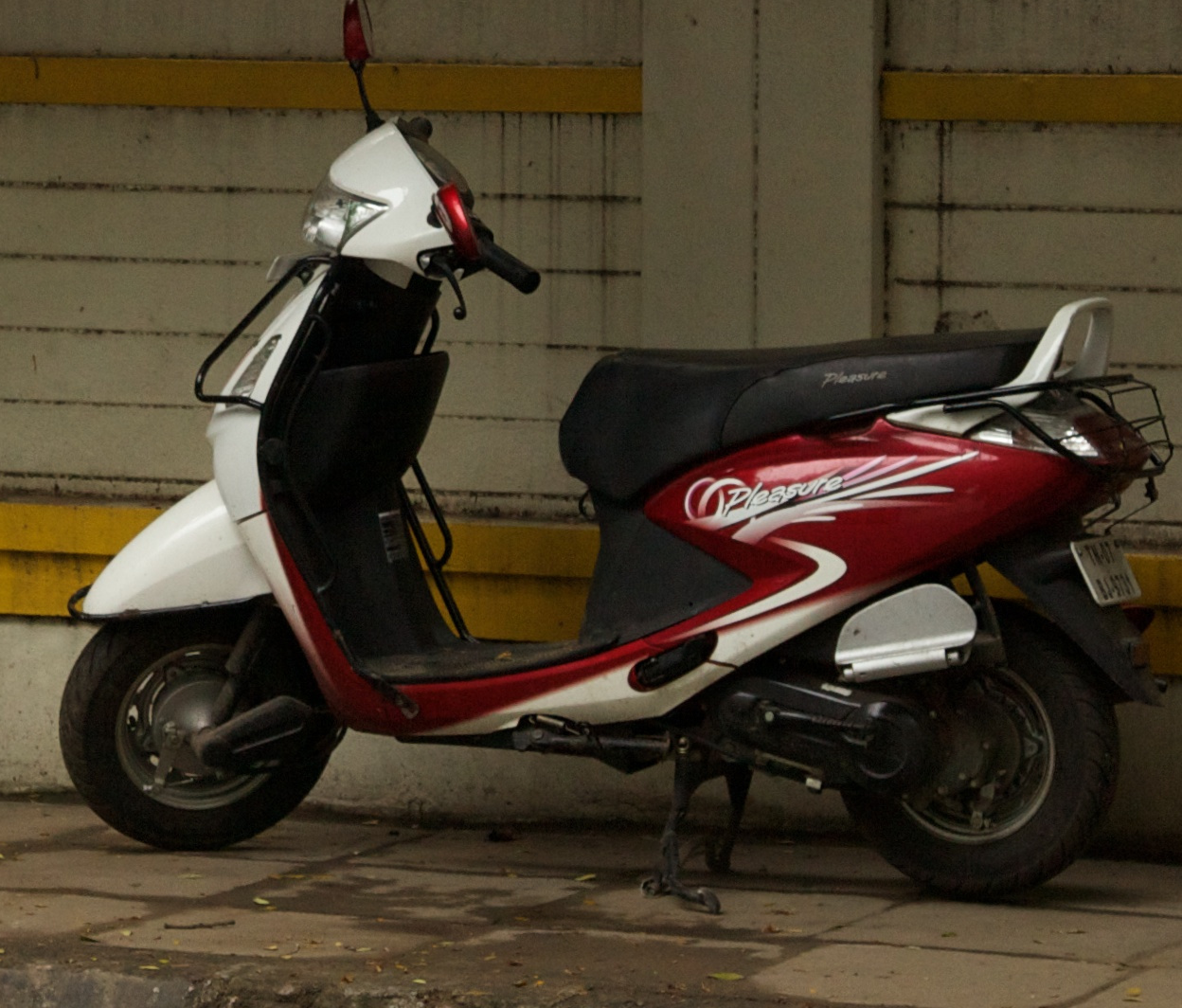
Hero Honda Pleasure First scooter launched under partnership by Hero Honda

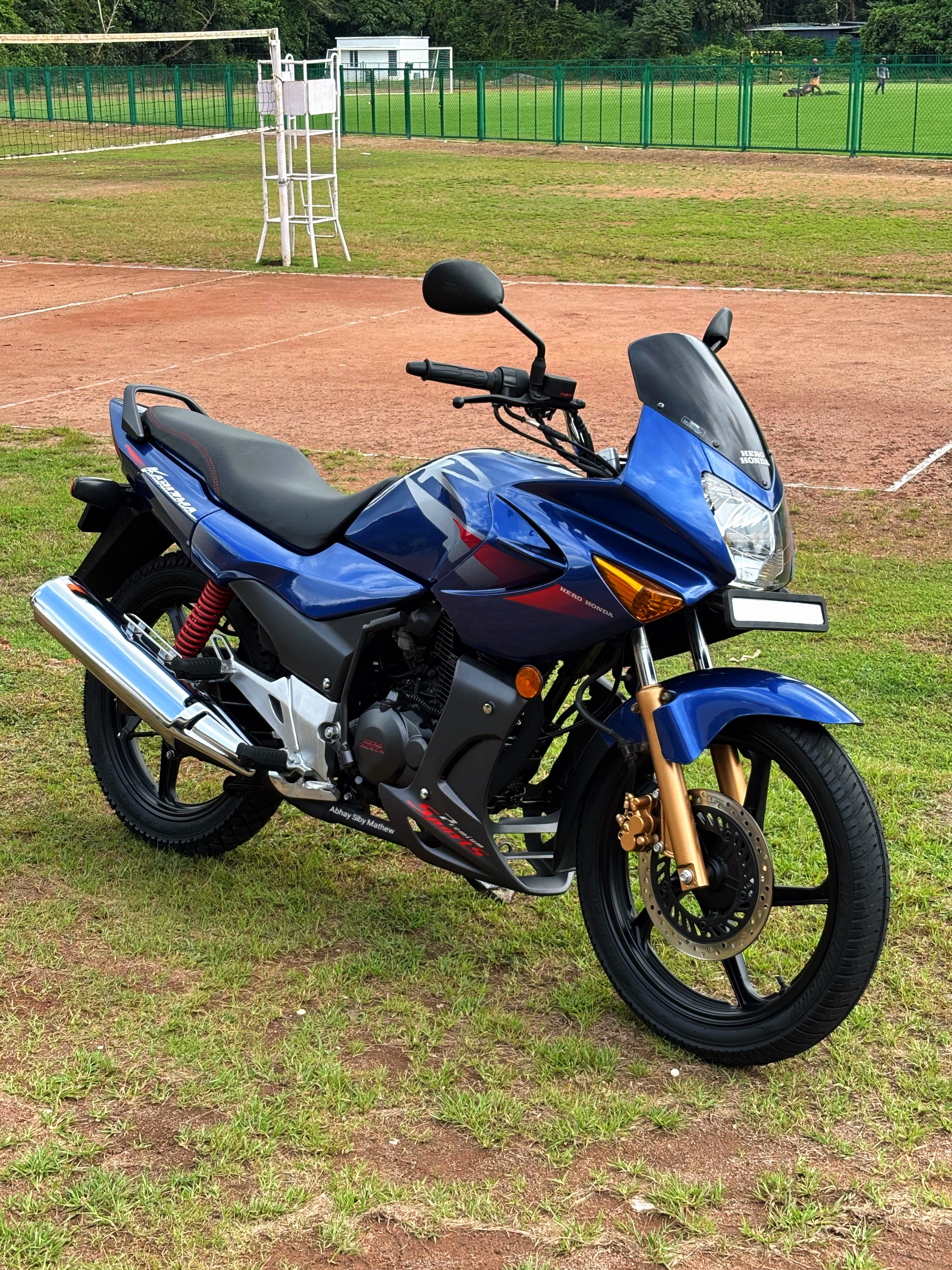
Hero Honda Karizma R

By December 2010, the board of directors of the Hero Honda Group had decided to terminate the joint venture between Hero Group of India and Honda of Japan in a phased manner. The Hero Group would buy out the 26% stake of the Honda in JV Hero Honda. Under the joint venture, Hero Group could not export to international markets (except Bangladesh, Nepal and Sri Lanka) and the termination would mean that Hero Group could now export.

Honda exited the joint venture through a series of off-market transactions by giving the Munjal family, which held a 26% stake in the company. Honda, wanting to focus only on its independent fully owned two-wheeler subsidiary, Honda Motorcycle and Scooter India (HMSI), exited Hero Honda at a discount and got over ₹6,400 crore (equivalent to ₹160 billion or US$1.7 billion in 2026) for its stake. The discount was between 30% and 50% to the current value of Honda's stake as per the price of the stock after the market closed on 16 December 2010.

The differences between the two partners had become apparent for a few years before the split over a variety of issues, ranging from Honda's reluctance to fully and freely share technology with Hero (despite a 10-year technology tie-up that expired in 2014) as well as Indian partner's uneasiness over high royalty payouts to the Japanese company. Another major irritant for Honda was the refusal of Munjal family to merge the Hero Honda's spare parts business with Honda's new fully owned subsidiary, HMSI.

As per the arrangement, it was a two-leg deal: In the first part, the Munjal family, led by Brijmohan Lal Munjal group, formed an overseas-incorporated special purpose vehicle (SPV) to buy out Honda's entire stake, which was backed by bridge loans. This SPV was eventually opened for private equity participation, and those included Warburg Pincus, KKR, TPG, Bain Capital and The Carlyle Group. In June 2012, Hero MotoCorp approved a proposal to merge the investment arm of its parent Hero Investment Pvt. Ltd. with the automaker. This decision came 18 months after its split from Hero Honda.

=== Formation of the new company ===
The name of the company was changed from Hero Honda Motors Limited to Hero MotoCorp Limited on 29 July 2011. The new brand identity and logo of Hero MotoCorp were developed by the global design firm Wolff Olins. The logo was revealed on 9 August 2011 in London, to coincide with a cricket match between England and India.

Hero MotoCorp can now export to Latin America, Africa, and West Asia. Hero is free to use any vendor for its components instead of just Honda-approved vendors.

On 21 April 2014, Hero MotoCorp announced its plan on a ₹254 crore (equivalent to ₹443 crore or US$47 million in 2026) joint venture with Bangladesh's Nitol-Niloy Group in the next five years to set up a manufacturing plant in Bangladesh. The plant started production in 2017 under the name "HMCL Niloy Bangladesh Limited". Hero MotoCorp owns 55% of the manufacturing company and the rest 45% is owned by Niloy Motors (a subsidiary of Nitol Niloy Group). Hero also updated its 100cc engine range in 2014 for 110cc bikes except for Hero Dawn.

== Equity investments ==
In July 2016, HMC acquired 49.2% shareholding in Erik Buell Racing, a motorcycle sport company which produced street and racing motorcycles based in East Troy, Wisconsin, United States. EBR filed for bankruptcy in 2015 and Hero MotoCorp proceed to acquire certain assets for ₹18.2 crore (equivalent to ₹34 crore or US$3.6 million in 2026).,

HMC invested ₹205 crores (US$30.5 million) as a Series B round of funding in October 2016 and gained a 32.31% stake in Ather Energy, a start-up company manufacturing electric scooters. It invested a further ₹130 crores (US$19 million) in 2018. HMC's share in Ather Energy has grown up to 34.58% since 2016.

== Operations ==
Hero MotoCorp has five manufacturing facilities based at Dharuhera, Gurgaon, Neemrana, Haridwar and Halol. A new manufacturing facility is in the process of being set up in Tirupati in Andhra Pradesh. Spread over 600 acres, the company has invested 1600 crores in setting up this greenfield facility. These plants together have a production capacity of over 7.6 million two-wheelers per year. Hero MotoCorp has a sales and service network with over 6,000 dealerships and service points across India. It has had a customer loyalty program since 2000, called the Hero Honda Passport Program which is now known as Hero GoodLife Program. As of 31 March 2020, the company has an annual capacity of 9.1 million units in its eight manufacturing facilities. Apart from these manufacturing facilities the company also has two R&D facilities, in Germany and Jaipur.

It is reported that Hero MotoCorp has five joint ventures or associate companies, Munjal Showa, AG Industries, Sunbeam Auto, Rockman Industries, and Satyam Auto Components, that supply a majority of its components.

Its most popular bike, the Hero Splendor sold more than one million units per year.

Hero MotoCorp launched XPulse 200 adventure motorcycle in India on 1 May 2019, along with the XPulse 200T touring motorcycle.

In January 2021, Hero MotoCorp's production exceeded 100 million. As of 2021, Hero is the only Indian vehicle brand to exceed 100 million in production.

Hero MotoCorp launched an online virtual showroom in 2021.

== Products ==
=== Motorcycle ===
1. Hero Splendor Series:
  - Hero Splendor Plus (100cc)
  - Hero Splendor Plus Xtec (100cc)
  - Hero Splendor Plus Xtec 2.0 (100cc)
  - Hero Super Splendor Xtec (125cc)
2. Hero HF Series:
  - Hero HF 100 (100cc)
  - Hero HF Deluxe (100cc)
  - Hero HF Deluxe Pro (100cc)
3. Hero Passion Series:
  - Hero Passion Plus (100cc)
4. Hero Glamour Series:
  - Hero Glamour (125cc)
  - Hero Glamour Xtec (125cc)
  - Hero Glamour X 125 (125cc)
5. Hero Xpulse Series:
  - Hero XPulse 200 4v (200cc)
  - Hero XPulse 210 (210cc)
6. Hero Xtreme Series:
  - Hero Xtreme 160R (160cc)
  - Hero Xtreme 160R 4V (160cc)
  - Hero Xtreme 125R (125cc)
  - Hero Xtreme 250R (250cc)
7. Hero Karizma Series:
  - Hero Karizma XMR (210cc)

=== Scooter ===
1. Hero Destini Series:
  - Hero Destini 125 (125cc)
  - Hero Destini Prime (125cc)
  - Hero Destini 110 (110cc)
  - Hero Destini 125 Xtec (125cc)
2. Hero Xoom Series:
  - Hero Xoom 110 (110cc)
  - Hero Xoom 125 (125cc)
  - Hero Xoom 160 (160cc)
3. Hero Pleasure Series:
  - Hero Pleasure Plus 110 (110cc)
  - Hero Pleasure Plus Xtec (110cc)

=== Discontinued ===
- Hero Passion Xpro
- Hero Passion Pro 110 (BS6)
- Hero Passion Xtec
- Hero HF Dawn
- Hero HF Deluxe Eco
- Hero Duet
- Hero Maestro
- Hero Maestro Edge 110
- Hero Maestro Edge 125
- Hero Ignitor
- Hero Xtreme 150
- Hero Xtreme Sports
- Hero Xtreme 200R
- Hero Xtreme 200S
- Hero Impulse
- Hero Xpulse 200T
- Hero Super Splendor
- Hero Honda Achiever Series and Achiever 150
- Hero Honda Passion and Passion Pro (100cc)
- Hero Honda Hunk
- Hero Honda Ambition
- Hero Honda CBZ
- Hero Honda CBZ Xtreme
- Hero Honda Sleek
- Hero Honda Street
- Hero Honda CD100
- Hero Honda CD100SS
- Hero Honda CD Dawn
- Hero Honda Joy
- Hero Honda CD Deluxe
- Hero Honda Splendor (100cc)
- Hero Splendor NXG (100cc)
- Hero Splendor Pro (100cc)
- Hero Splendor Pro Classic
- Hero Splendor iSmart (100cc and 110cc)
- Hero Honda Karizma (223cc)
- Hero Honda Karizma R (223cc)
- Hero Honda Karizma ZMR (223cc)
- Hero Mavrick 440 (440cc)

=== Electric vehicles ===
Hero MotoCorp's electric mobility brand, Vida (marketed as VIDA), sells the V1, V2 and VX2 electric scooters and the DIRT.E K3 electric off-roader. In the January-August 2026 period, Vida was India's fourth-largest electric two-wheeler brand by retail sales, with an 11 percent market share.

== Listings and shareholding ==
The equity shares of Hero MotoCorp are listed on the Bombay Stock Exchange, and the National Stock Exchange of India, where it is a constituent of the NIFTY 50.

As on 31 December 2013, the promoters Munjal Family held around 40% equity shares in Hero MotoCorp. Over 601,000 individual shareholders hold approx. 7.44% of its shares. Foreign Institutional Investors hold approx. 30% shares in the company.

Shareholders of Hero MotorCorp, as of 31 March 2020
Shareholder	Percent ownership
Promoter Group	34.6%
Foreign institutional investors (FII)	34.3%
Non-resident Indians (NRIs)	0.4%
Indian public	8.3%
Insurance companies	8.3%
Mutual funds / UTI	8.2%
Bodies corporate	1.40%
Financial institutions / banks	2.0%
Others	2.5%
Total	100%

== Employees ==
As of May 2017, the company had 8,069 employees, of whom 185 were women (2.3%). It also had 16,114 temporary employees.

== Awards and recognition ==
- The 2006 Forbes list of the 200 World's Most Respected Companies ranked Hero Honda Motors at No. 108.
- The Brand Trust Report published by Trust Research Advisory has ranked Hero Honda in the 7th position among the most trusted brands in India.

== Other initiatives ==
In 1992, the company started Raman Kant Munjal Foundation (RKMF), which oversees the Raman Munjal Vidya Mandir and BML Munjal University.

== Sponsorship ==
Hero has been the sponsor of the Caribbean Premier League, a twenty-20 cricket franchise, since 2018. Since 2014, Hero has sponsored the Hero World Challenge golf tournament. Hero also sponsors two British events on the Golf European Tour: English Open (known as the Hero Open) and the Betfred British Masters. Hero is also a partner of Spanish club Atlético Madrid.

Hero were also the title sponsors of the first ever senior FIH World Hockey5s in 2022.

=== Football ===
Hero sponsored India's football leagues, the Indian Super League, I-League, I-League Qualifiers, Futsal Club Championship, Indian Women's League, Senior NFC for Santosh Trophy, AIFF Super Cup, Youth League and previously Federation Cup. They were also the principal sponsors of all India national and developmental football team kits. They pulled out from all the sponsorships in 2023 due to internal issues.

== Allegations of tax evasion ==
In March 2022, the Income tax department conducted raids on offices and several other locations of Hero MotoCorp. Following this, the department stated in a report that the two-wheeler giant had made bogus claims of expenses to the tune of Rs 1000 crore.

== See also ==
- Ather Energy
- Bajaj Auto
- Okinawa Autotech
- Ola Electric
- TVS Motor Company
- List of companies of India
