= Hero Xtreme =

- Manufacturer: Hero MotoCorp (Formerly Hero Honda Motors)
- Production: 2013-present
- Class: Standard(125R), Naked(160R) and (250R), Sport bike(200S)
- Engine: 163 cc, 125cc, 200cc, 250cc
- Transmission: 5-speed constant mesh
- Suspension: Front Telescopic hydraulic type, and rear Rectangular swing arm with 5 step adjustable gas reservoir suspension
- Brakes: Front Disc Dia 240 mm, and rear Disc Dia 220 mm(160R,200S) rear Drum (125R)
- Tires: Front 80 / 100 x 18 – 47 P, and rear 120/ 90 x 17 - 37P
- Wheelbase: 1325 mm
- Dimensions: L: 2080 mm W: 765 mm H: 1145 mm
- Fuel capacity: 12.1 litre (Min)

The Hero Xtreme is a 125/160/200/250 cc motorcycle from Hero MotorCorp. It was Hero's 150 cc contender in place of Hero Honda CBZ Xtreme launched after moving out of the Hero Honda JV. In June 2019, Hero MotoCorp launched a sportier version of its popular 150cc motorcycle in the form of the Xtreme Sports. Although the engine of Xtreme Sports was alike the traditional Hero Xtreme, the former had more power than the standard version. In 2020 hero launched 160 CV Hero Xtreme bike. In January 2024 hero launched a 125 cc version of Xtreme series motorcycle.
