= Hero Honda Pleasure =

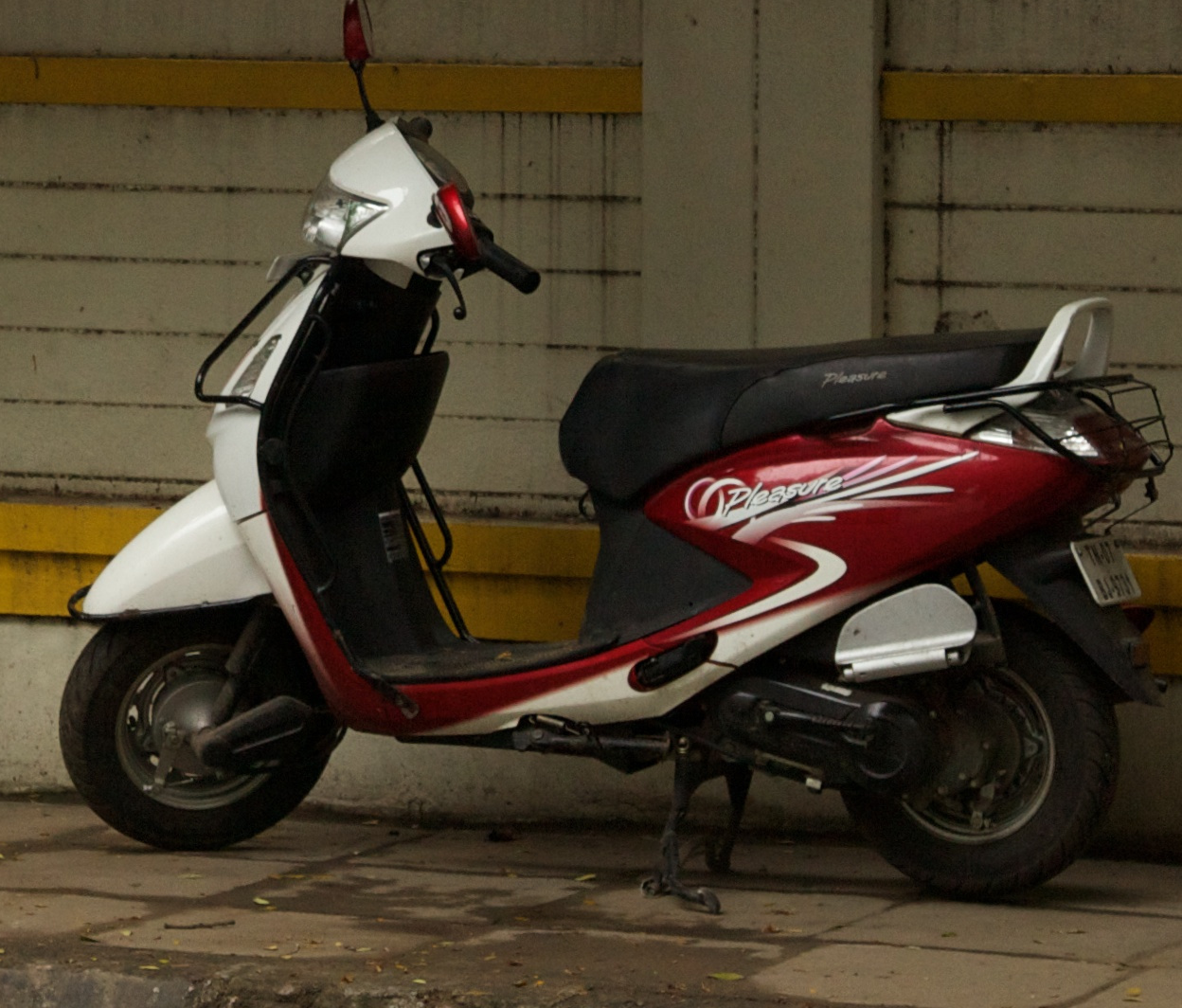
- Manufacturer: Hero Honda (2005–2010); Hero Motocorp (2011–2020)
- Production: 2005-2020
- Successor: Hero Pleasure Plus
- Engine: 102 cc (6.2 cu in), air-cooled, four-stroke, OHC, single
- Power: 5.15 KW @ 7000 RPM
- Torque: 8.10 Nm @ 5000 RPM
- Transmission: Variomatic
- Suspension: Front: bottom link with spring-loaded hydraulic dampers Rear: swingarm with spring-loaded hydraulic dampers
- Brakes: Drum; internal expanding-shoe type (130 mm (5.1 in)) (combined braking system)
- Tires: 3.50 x 10 – 4 PR / 51 J (tube LESS)
- Weight: 101 kg (223 lb) (dry)
- Fuel capacity: 5 L (1.1 imp gal; 1.3 US gal)
- Related: Hero Maestro

The Hero Pleasure was an automatic scooter manufactured in India by Hero Honda. It was launched in 2005.

== History ==
It was the first scooter manufactured by Hero Honda, traditionally a motorcycle company, and was received very positively. As of 2013, it sold in the range of 40,000 units per month, and is second only to the Honda Activa in a rapidly growing scooter segment.

The Pleasure was unique at a marketing level more than at a product level. It was positioned sharply as a women's scooter with the brand tagline "Why should boys have all the fun?" conceived by team FCB-Ulka. It thus polarized the entire scooter market, with offerings being positioned either specifically male or female. The Pleasure thus carved a niche for itself, and quickly went on to capture almost 17% of the market in a short space of time. In 2020, the Hero Pleasure was discontinued and was replaced by the Hero Pleasure Plus.

== Features ==
The Pleasure features a 102 cc (6.2 cu in) engine with variomatic drive transmission system and an engine swingarm suspension system.

2013 saw a number of improvements in the Pleasure, and included a Pleasure limited edition and the All New Pleasure.
