= Splendor (motorcycle) =

Motorcycle Manufactured by Hero Honda

Hero Splendor
- Manufacturer: Hero Honda (1994 - 2012); Hero (2012 - Present)
- Also called: Splendor+, Splendor Pro
- Parent company: Honda, Japan 1994 - 2011 and Hero 2012 - Present
- Production: 1994 – present
- Predecessor: Hero Honda CD100
- Class: Commuter
- Engine: 97.2 cc (5.93 cu in), air-cooled, OHC, 4-stroke, single
- Power: 8.02Ps
- Torque: 8.05Nm
- Transmission: 4-speed, manual
- Suspension: Telescopic Fork on front and Dual Shock absorbers on rear
- Brakes: Front: 130mm drum Rear: 130mm drum
- Tires: Front: 2.75 × 18-4PR, Rear: 2.75 × 18-4/6PR
- Wheelbase: 1,230 mm (48 in)
- Dimensions: L: 1,970 mm (78 in); W: 720 mm (28 in); H: 1,080 mm (43 in)
- Seat height: 785 mm (30.9 in)
- Weight: 110 kg (wet)
- Fuel capacity: 11 L (2.4 imp gal; 2.9 US gal); Reserve: 1.4 L (0.31 imp gal; 0.37 US gal)

The Hero Splendor is an entry-level motorcycle manufactured in India by Hero MotoCorp (formerly Hero Honda). It has an electronic ignition and a tubular double cradle type frame with a 97.2 cc (5.93 cu in) engine. The engine is based on the Honda Cub C100EX with a similar bore and stroke of 50 mm × 49.5 mm (1.97 in × 1.95 in). As of 2009, Splendor models were selling at a rate of one million units per year.

== History ==
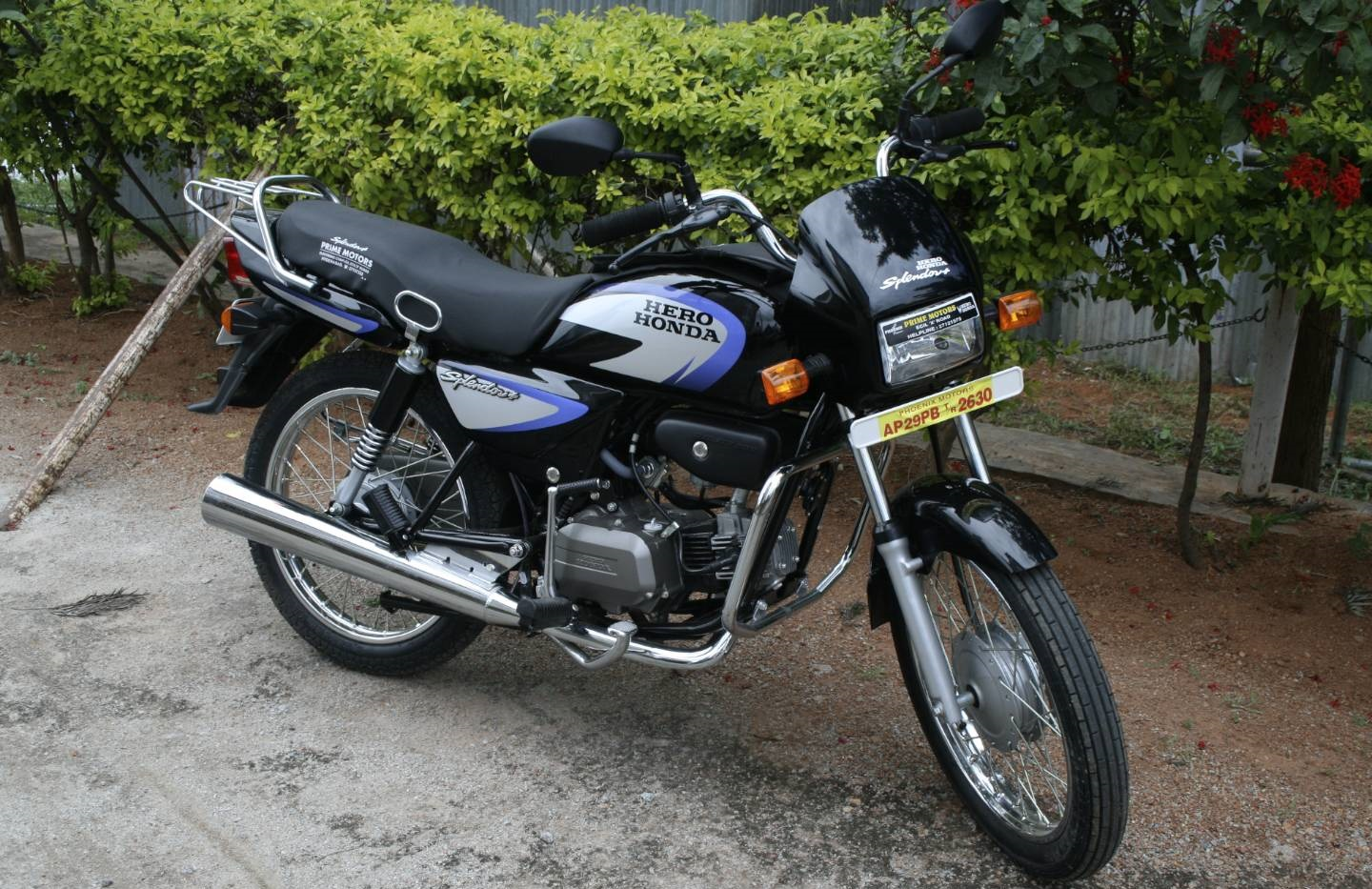
Hero Honda Splendor Plus 2004 Model with Updated Graphics, Multi-reflector Head light and Tail Light

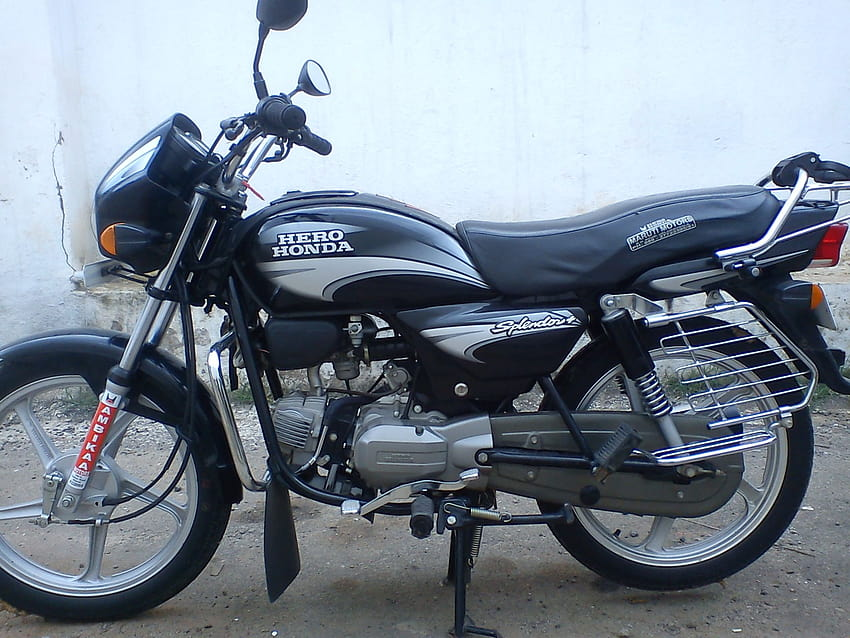
Hero Honda Splendor Plus 2007 with changes in body fairings and including alloy wheels and other improvements

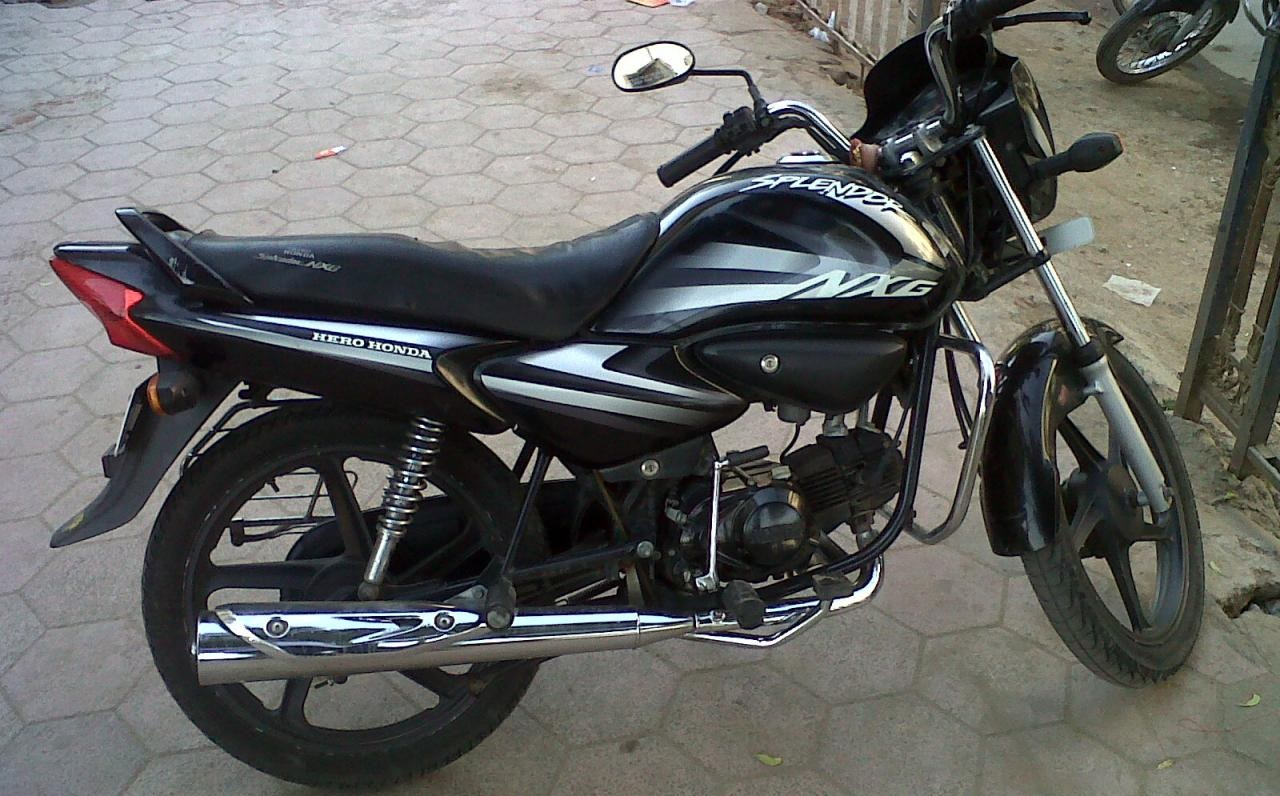
Hero Honda Splendor NXG (Next Generation Model) with change in headlight design and added trip meter in instrument cluster etc.

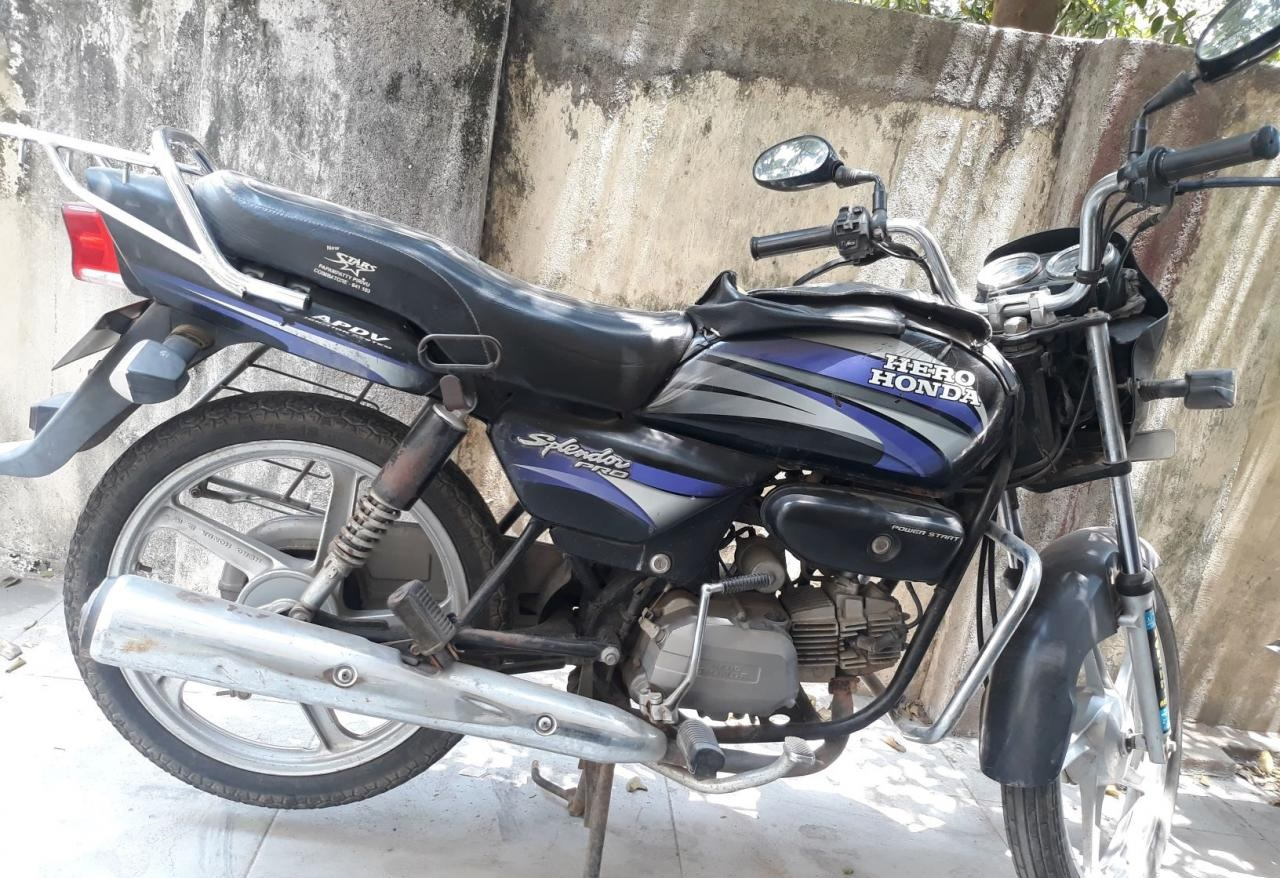
Hero Honda Splendor Pro 2011 with updated Graphics, Self Start, Alloy wheels and APDV.

After the separation of Hero group and Honda motor company, the Splendor is now manufactured by Hero Motocorp

== Models List from 1994 - Present ==
All Splendor Models equipped with same Engine and other Specification except Splendor NXG, Splendor i3s and Splendor iSmart 110 and updated Splendor plus i3s, Splendor classic, Xtec models updated with more power from 7.7 Horsepower to 8.02 Horsepower with same engine configuration.

- Hero Honda Splendor 1994 (1st Generation) (BS1) Bharat stage emission standards. (1994 - 2004).
- Hero Honda Splendor Plus 2004 (BS2) and (BS3) Bharat stage emission standards (2nd Generation) and updated with Alloy Wheels instead of Spoke wheel in 2007.(2004 - 2011).
- Hero Honda Splendor 1 Crore Special edition (BS3) Bharat stage emission standards with new updated all black paint in body, engine and alloy wheel(2009 - 2010).
- Hero Honda Splendor NXG (Next Generation) (BS3) Bharat stage emission standards, This model came with Self Start, Alloy Wheels, New Premium Analogue Instrument Cluster with Trip meter and Completely new body design with same 97.2cc engine. (2007 - 2015).
- Hero Honda Splendor Pro (3rd Generation) (BS3) Bharat stage emission standards, This model came with Self Start, Alloy Wheels and New Premium Analogue Instrument Cluster. (2011 - 2012)

After 2011, The separation of joint venture Hero Honda, Hero Motocorp replaced the Hero Honda logo with Hero Motocorp logo in their future models at that time.

- Hero Splendor Pro (3rd Generation) (BS3) Bharat stage emission standards, Same Hero Honda Splendor Pro Model, name is rebadged (2011 - 2015).
- Hero Splendor Plus (3rd Generation)(BS3) Bharat stage emission standards, Same Hero Honda Splendor Plus Model, name is rebadged (2011 - 2017).
- Hero Splendor Classic (1st Generation) (BS3) Bharat stage emission standards, this motorcycle is styled as a cafe racer. The Splendor Pro Classic features several classic design elements, including a new handlebar designed to resemble clip-ons, as well as a round headlamp and tail lamp. The fuel tank, rear cowl, and single seat have also been molded to give the Splendor Pro Classic the appearance of a traditional cafe racer. The rear-view mirrors, headlamp ring, instrument cluster rings, front and rear fenders, suspension, and silencer are finished in chrome to enhance its retro appeal. However, it was discontinued in 2018 due to low sales (2014 - 2018).
- Hero Splendor ISmart (1st Generation) (BS3) Bharat stage emission standards, it is just an updated model of Hero Honda Splendor NXG with same engine, Features, design, chassis and added i3s(Idle Start Stop System) etc. with rebadging of Hero Motocorp (2014 - 2016).
- Hero Splendor Pro (4th Generation) (BS3) Bharat stage emission standards, New edition of Splendor Pro with New design Instrument cluster, Tank, and body design, self start with same 97.2cc power plant (2015–2018).
- Hero Splendor Plus i3s (4th Generation) (BS4) Bharat stage emission standards, This model gets Idle start stop system, new color schemes and graphics with same old school Splendor Plus design and engine. Later, it get updated with IBS (Integrated Braking system), catalytic converter, Oxygen sensor on exhaust with Programmed fuel injection system to comply with (BS6) emission NormsBharat stage emission standards in 2020. (2018–Present)
- Hero Splendor ISMART 110 (2nd Generation) (BS6) Bharat stage emission standards Successor of Splendor ISmart(1st Generation), This Model also get Idle start stop system, with completely new design and brand new 110cc Power plant, and also it is the first bike in India to get BS6 emission NormsBharat stage emission standards Complaint in 2019 with added catalytic converter, Oxygen sensor on exhaust with Programmed fuel injection, but it eventually discontinued in 2021 due to low sales (2017–2021).
- Hero Splendor Plus XTEC (5th Generation) (BS6) Bharat stage emission standards Launched in 2022, with updated all black graphics, with front disc brake, all-digital instrument cluster with Bluetooth connectivity and it offers a host of information, including SMS & call alerts, twin trip meters, Led DRL in Front Visor and a real-time mileage indicator. (2022–Present).

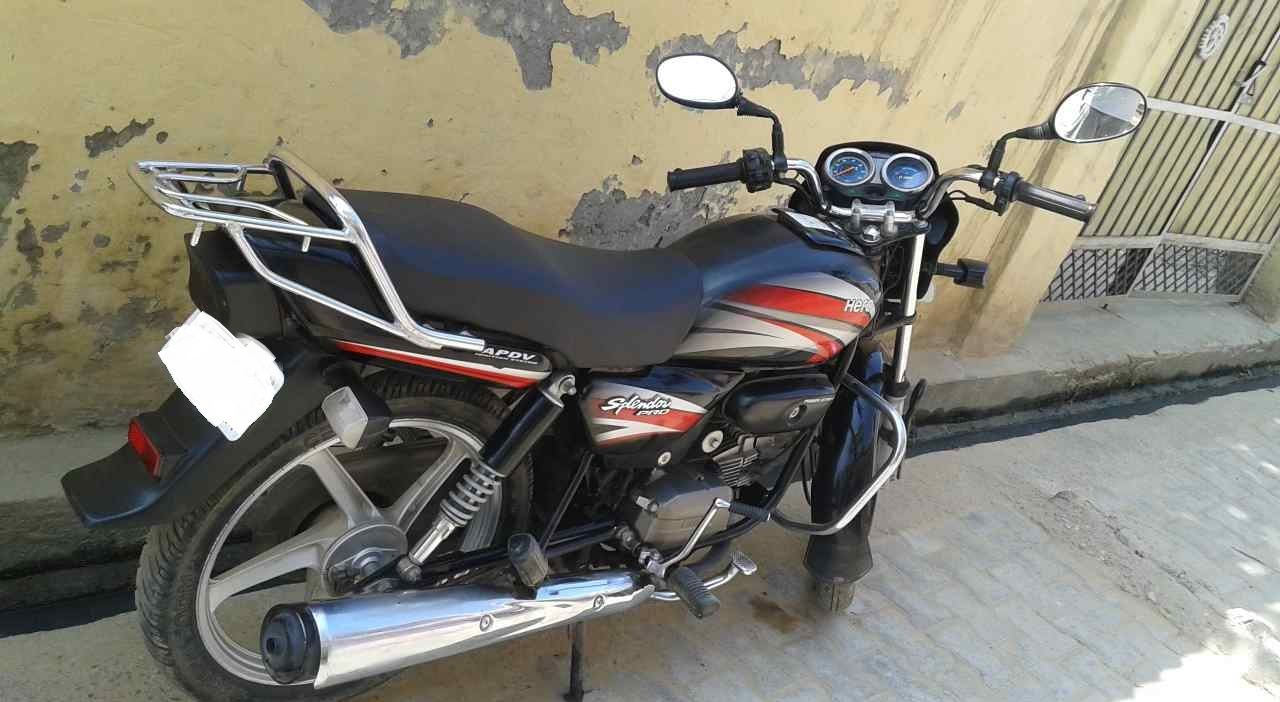
Hero Splendor Pro 2011 (3rd Generation) Same Hero Honda Splendor Pro Model, name is rebadged

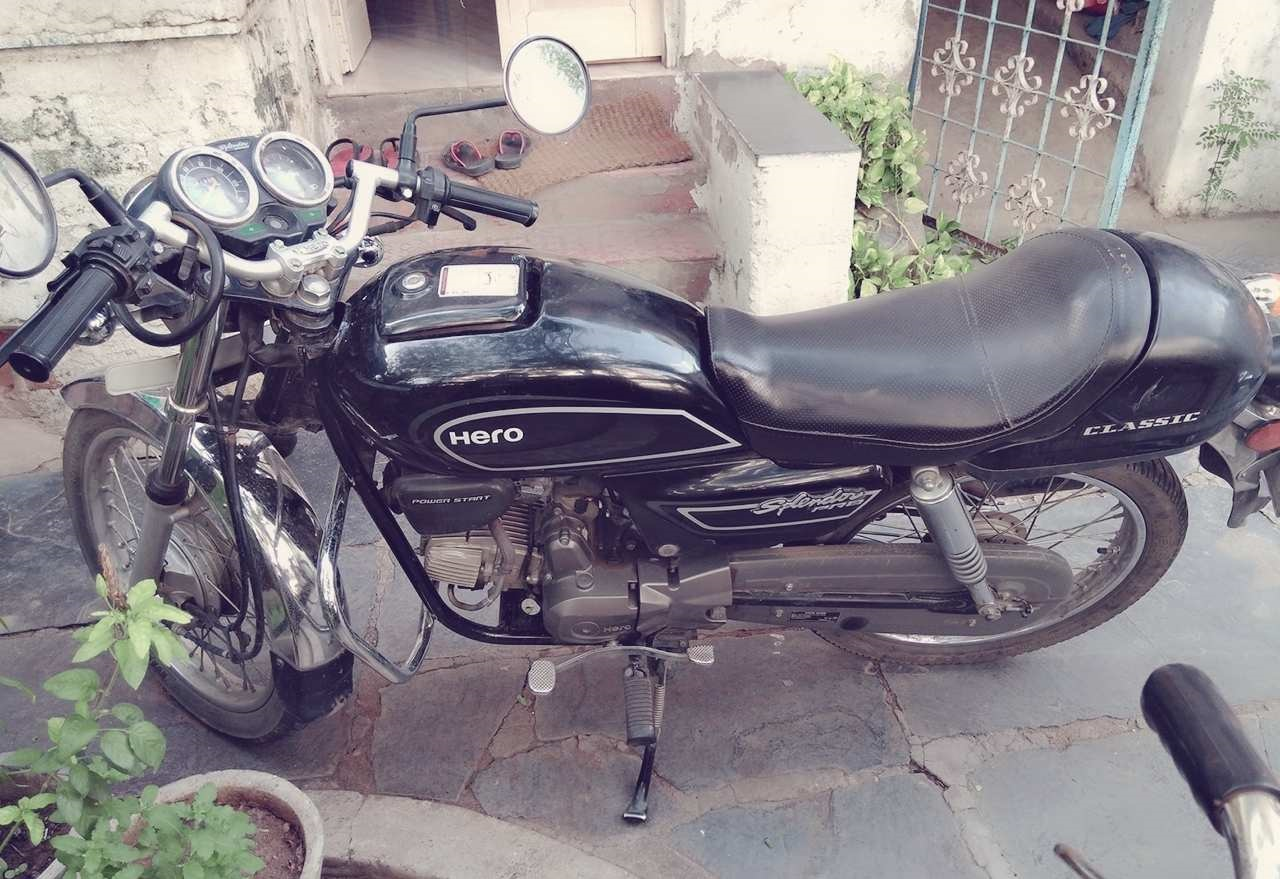
Hero Splendor Classic 2014 (1st Generation), cafe-racer design inspired model

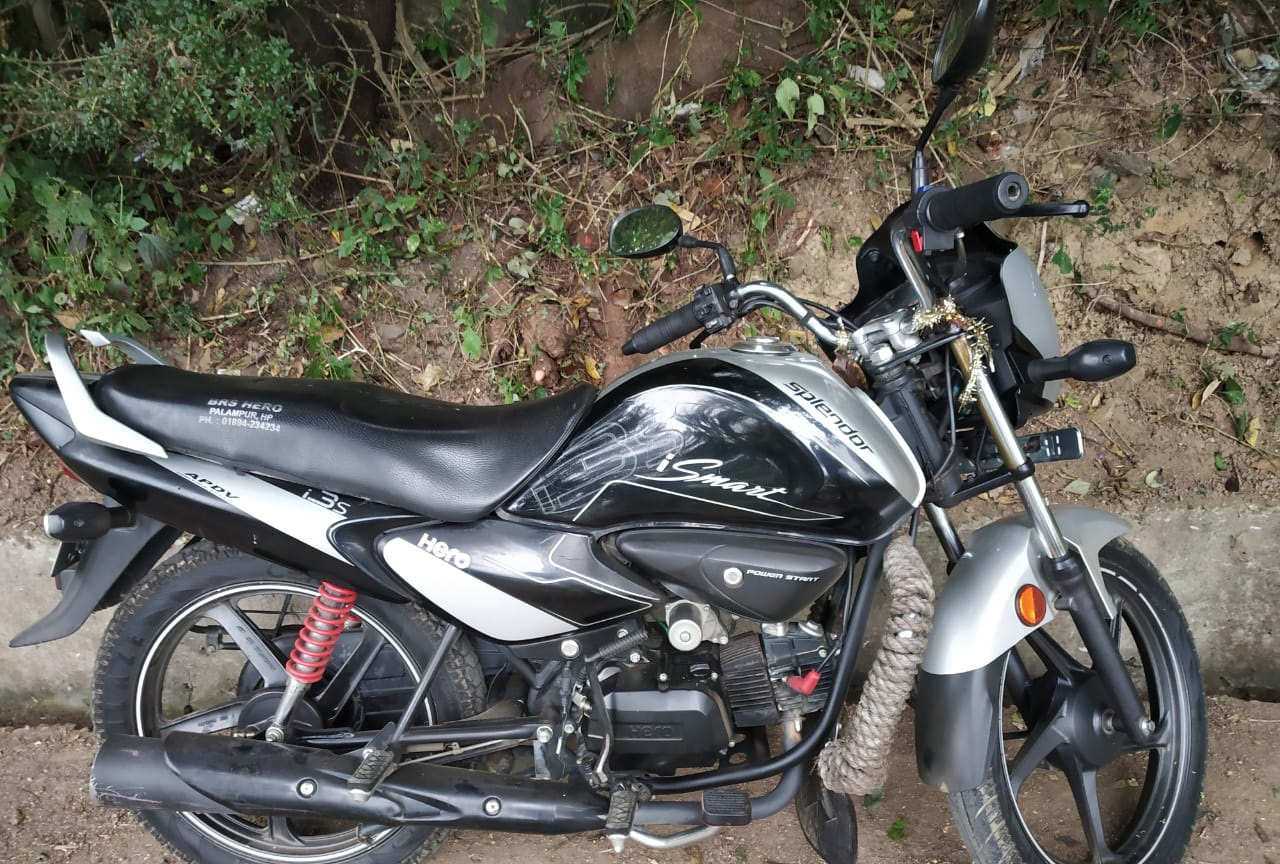
Hero Splendor ISMART 100cc 2014 Model (1st Generation)

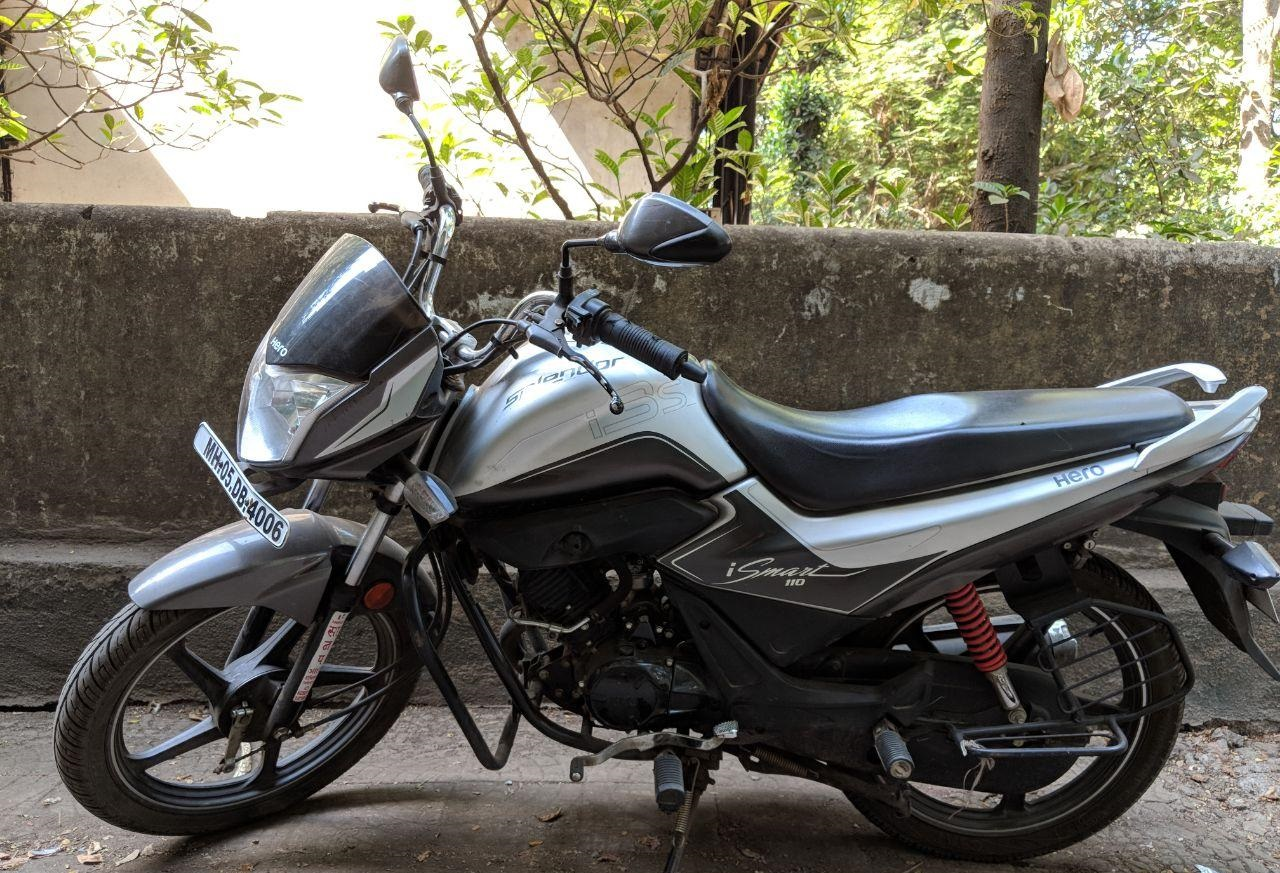
Hero Splendor ISMART 110 2017 Model 1st Generation

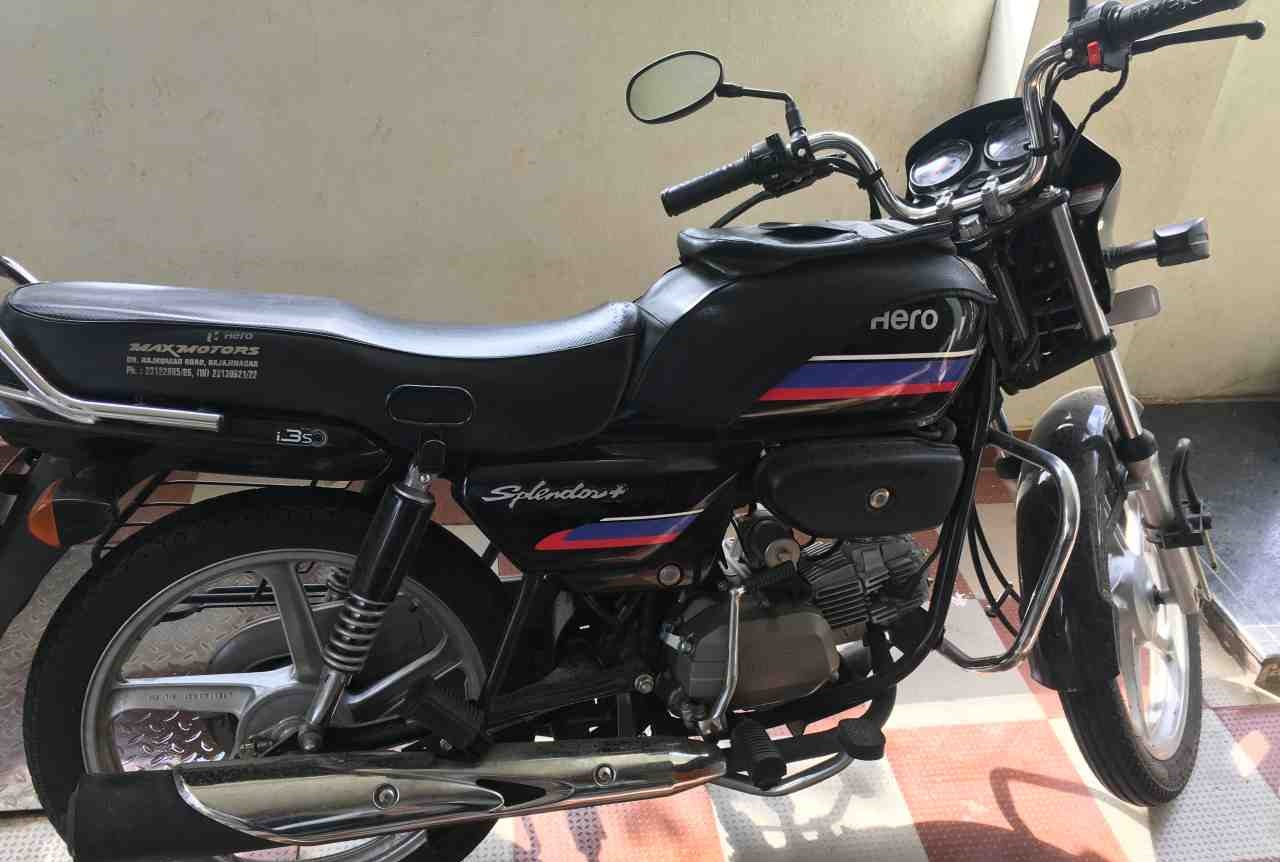
Hero Splendor Plus i3s and IBS 2018 (4th Generation)

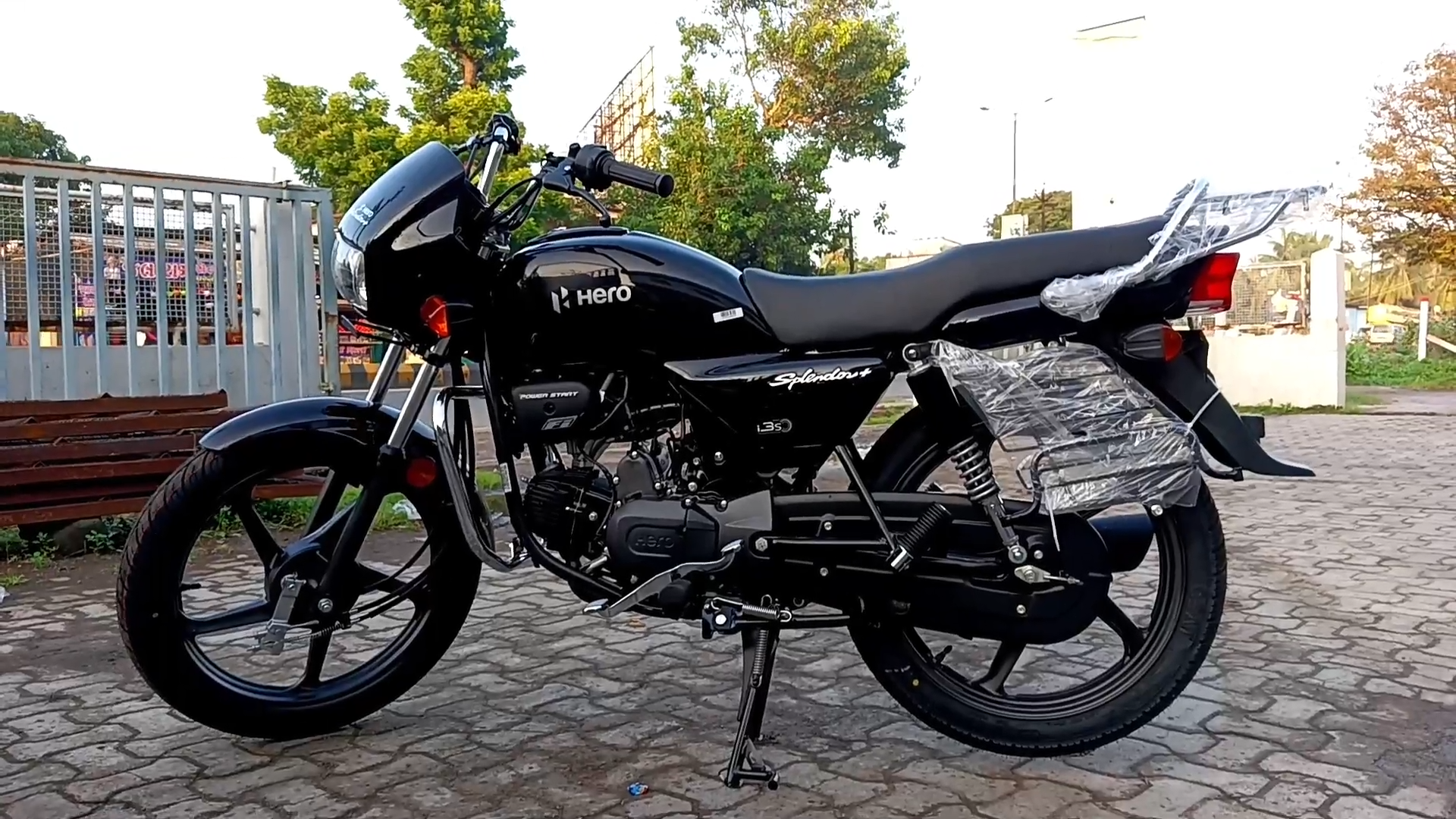
Hero Splendor Plus i3s All Black Edition and IBS 2023 model Non- Xtec PGM FI Model.

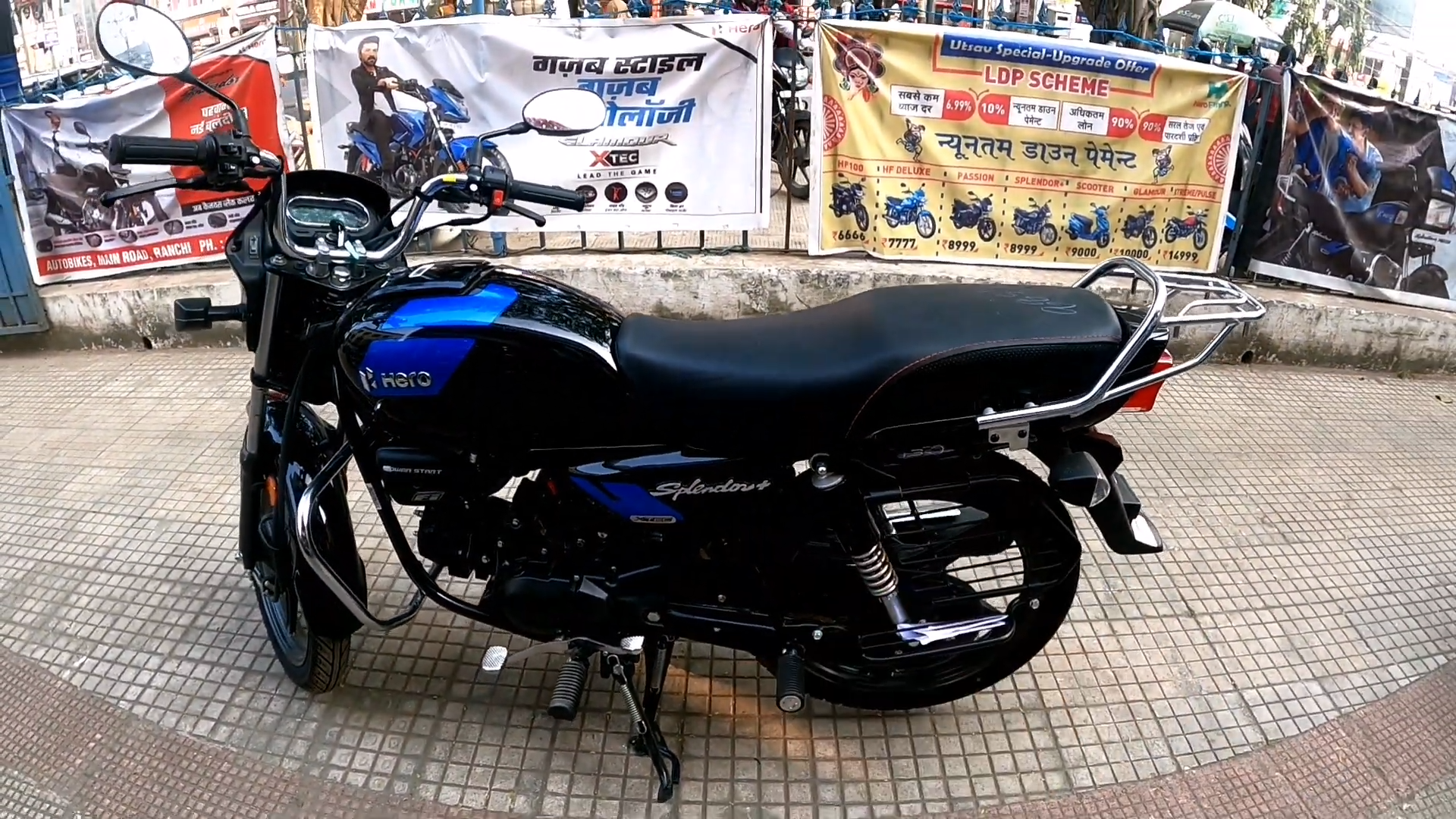
Hero Splendor XTEC 2022 (5th Generation) BS6 - updated all black graphics, all-digital instrument cluster with Bluetooth connectivity .
