= Hero Honda Karizma =

Motorcycle manufactured by Hero Honda

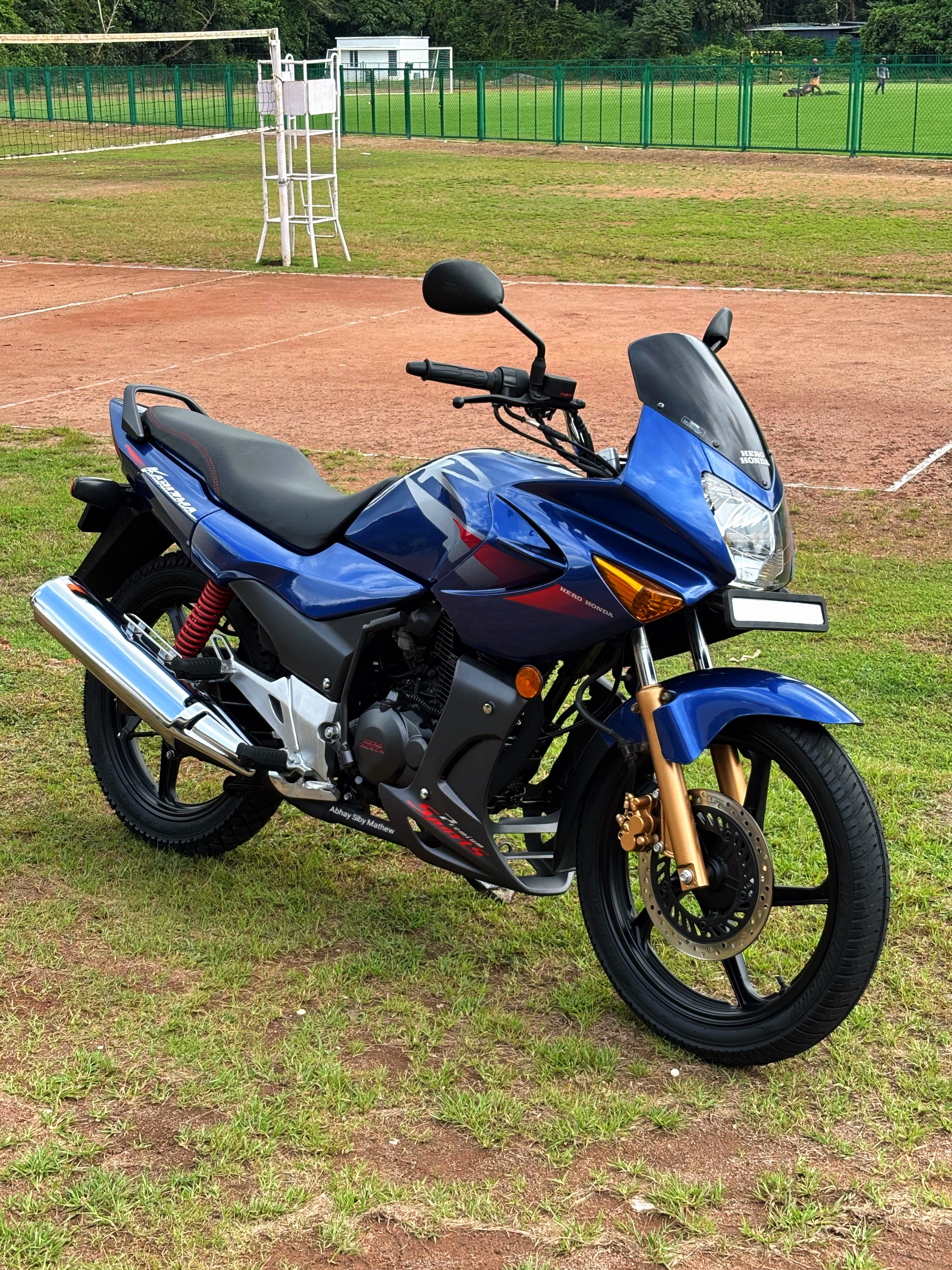
- Manufacturer: Hero Motocorp (2003–2010); Hero MotoCorp (2011–present)
- Production: 2003–present
- Predecessor: Hero Honda CBZ and Hero Honda Ambition 135
- Successor: Hero Honda Karizma R Hero Karizma XMR
- Class: Sport touring motorcycle
- Engine: 223 cc (13.6 cu in) 4-stroke, air cooled single
- Compression ratio: 9:1
- Top speed: 200 Kmph
- Power: 14.9 kW (20.0 hp) @ 10,000 rpm (claimed)
- Torque: 14.5 ft⋅lb (19.7 N⋅m) @ 6,500 rpm (claimed)
- Transmission: 5-speed
- Brakes: Front - Disc, 276 mm Rear ZMR/R – Disc, 240 mm / Internal extending shoe type, 130 mm
- Tires: Front Tyre: 2.75 x 18 -42P and Rear Tyre: 100/90 x 18 - 56P
- Wheelbase: 1355 mm
- Dimensions: L: 2125 mm W: 755 mm H: 1160 mm
- Seat height: 795 mm (31.3 in)
- Weight: 150 kg (330 lb) (claimed) (dry)
- Fuel capacity: 15.0 L (3.3 imp gal; 4.0 US gal), 2.0 L (0.44 imp gal; 0.53 US gal) Reserve
- Fuel consumption: 40 Kmpl

Hero Honda Karizma was a premium semi-faired motorcycle manufactured by Hero Honda. It was first launched in May 2003, given a facelifted update with some change in graphics in 2006. After that the Hero Honda was given a cosmetic upgrade and relaunched as Karizma R in 2007. In September 2009, it was supplemented by another variant Karizma ZMR with programmed fuel injection in 2009. The production of this motorcycle stopped in 2019 due to poor sales and it was relaunched on 29 August 2023 as the Karizma XMR.

Hero Honda Karizma 2003 model

== Design ==
Karizma has been designed specifically as one of the first Semi-Faired bike for the Indian market and design was inspired from LML Adreno.The instrument panel and the tank recesses are also designed keeping their functionality in mind.

== Engine ==
Karizma has Honda's original tried and tested, but slightly detuned version of 223 cc SOHC air-cooled engine from the CRF230 series of enduro/MX/supermoto bikes that are sold in the United States and South American markets. It has a five-speed gearbox in place of the CRF's six-speed. The engine is an all-aluminium, undersquare engine (bore 65.5 mm or 2.58 in and stroke 66.2 mm or 2.61 in) running a compression ratio of 9:1. It features a Kehlin CV carburettor with a CCVI switch.

== Developments ==
The successor of Hero Honda Karizma is Hero Honda Karizma R. The second gen Hero Karizma R came in 2014 .

== Related bikes ==
- Hero Honda Ambition 135
- Hero Honda Karizma R
- Hero Honda Splendor
- Hero Honda Hunk
- Hero Passion
- Hero Pleasure
- Hero Honda Achiever
- Honda Shine
- Honda Unicorn
- Hero Honda CBZ
- Hero Honda Super Splendor
- Hero Honda Karizma ZMR
- Honda Activa
