= Duncan Thornton =

Canadian author (born 1962)

Duncan Thornton (born June 14, 1962) is a Canadian author, speaker, and futurist. He was born in Gods Lake Narrows, Manitoba, where his father served as minister in the United Church of Canada. The family moved to Winnipeg a few years later. At the age of the 13 he dropped out of school, but 20 he enrolled as a mature student at the University of Saskatchewan in Saskatoon. He went on to graduate from the University of Winnipeg (BA, hon.s in English and History). He also did graduate work in English at both Concordia University in Montreal and the University of Manitoba. He currently lives in Winnipeg with his wife, author Brenda Hasiuk, and their two children.

Thornton was diagnosed with multiple sclerosis in 2009. In March 2010, Thornton visited the EuroMedic clinic in Katowice, Poland, to become one of the first Canadians treated for CCSVI, a vascular problem common in MS patients first described by Dr. Paolo Zamboni. He has spoken frequently in the media about CCSVI and his experience with its treatment, and was one of the founders of CCSVI Manitoba, a group that advocates for access to CCSVI testing and treatment for Manitobans with Multiple Sclerosis.

== Bibliography ==
=== Novels ===
His first novel, Kalifax (1999), a young adult fiction fantasy described as a fairy-tale retelling of the search for the Northwest Passage, was nominated for the 2000 Governor General's Award for Children's Literature. The sequel, Captain Jenny and the Sea of Wonders (2001) was a counterpart inspired by classic literature of Old World exploration. The final book in the series, The Star-Glass (2003), won the 2004 McNally Robinson Book Prize for Young People.

Shadow-Town (2008) his first novel in several years, is the first of a new four-book sequence called "The Vastlands."

=== Other works ===
Thornton was the founding editor of the electronic version of Canadian Materials, one of the first regular on-line publications in Canada. He also developed and led Red River College’s innovative New Media Program. These experiences led to a second career as a lecturer and columnist on technology trends.

Thornton was also the 2004-2005 Writer-in-Residence for the Winnipeg Public Library.
