= Hero Karizma ZMR =

Motorcycle manufactured by Hero MotoCorp

- Manufacturer: Hero MotoCorp
- Production: 2009-2020
- Predecessor: Karizma R
- Successor: Karizma XMR
- Class: Sport touring motorcycle
- Engine: 223 cc (13.6 cu in) FI, air-cooled (with oil cooler), four-stroke cycle, single
- Ignition type: Electric start
- Transmission: 5-speed manual
- Suspension: Front: Telescopic fork, 135 mm travel Rear: Swingarm
- Brakes: Front: 276/260 mm (disc); Rear: 130/230 mm disc brake
- Tires: Front:2.75*18; Rear:100*18
- Wheelbase: 1,350 mm (53 in)
- Dimensions: L: 2,110 mm (83 in); W: 805 mm (31.7 in); H: 1,175 mm (46.3 in)
- Fuel capacity: 15.3 L
- Related: Bajaj Pulsar 220

The Hero Karizma ZMR is a motorcycle manufactured by Hero MotoCorp in India. It was launched as a cosmetic upgrade to Karizma R in September 2009. There is no difference between its engine and that of its predecessor Karizma R. The minor differences lie in the design of fairing, headlights, addition of digital speedometer, rear disc brake, rear swingarm suspension, oil cooler and the fuel-injection system instead of the carburettor.

The latest updated model was launched in 2014 which had an upgraded engine had and a totally new design.
