= Hero Honda Achiever Series =

Motorcycle Manufactured by Hero Honda

Hero Honda Achiever
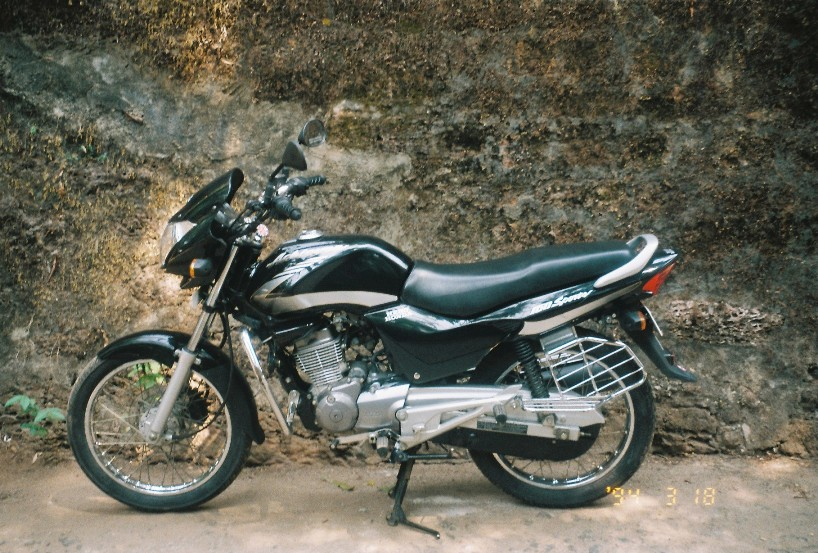
- Manufacturer: Hero Honda (2006–2010); Hero Motocorp (2011–present)
- Also called: Hero Eco 150 Hero Dawn 150 Hero Hunter 150
- Production: 2006–2010 (Original), 2011-present (Facelift)
- Predecessor: Hero Honda Ambition 135
- Successor: Hero Achiever (2011-2015) and Hero Achiever 150 (2017-2019)
- Class: Commuter
- Engine: 149.2 cc (9.10 cu in) 4-Stroke OHC Single-cylinder engine 2-Valve
- Bore / stroke: 57.3 mm × 57.8 mm (2.26 in × 2.28 in)
- Compression ratio: 9.1:1
- Top speed: 110Kmph
- Power: 13.4 HP@8000rpm
- Torque: 12.80 Nm@5000rpm
- Ignition type: Digital-DC CDI Ignition (AMI) Advanced Microprocessor Ignition
- Transmission: 5 speed constant mesh, chain
- Frame type: Tubular Diamond Type, Single Cradle Frame
- Suspension: Front: telescopic fork; Rear: swingarm
- Brakes: Front: 240 mm disc; Rear: 130 mm drum
- Tires: Front: 2.75 X18 42p - 4PR; Rear: 3.00 X 18 52p - 6PR
- Wheelbase: 1,290 mm (51 in)
- Dimensions: L: 2,040 mm (80 in); W: 760 mm (30 in); H: 1,120 mm (44 in)
- Seat height: 805 mm (31.7 in)
- Weight: 138 kg (dry)
- Fuel capacity: 12.5 L (2.7 imp gal; 3.3 US gal), 2.3 L (0.51 imp gal; 0.61 US gal) Reserve
- Fuel consumption: 50Kmpl
- Turning radius: 2.05 m (6 ft 9 in); Source Advice, Bike (15 August 2010). "Hero Honda Achiever Review". BikeAdvice - Latest Bike News, Motorcycle Reviews, Electric Vehicle Updates.

== Brief ==
The Hero Honda Achiever is a 149.1 cc motorcycle manufactured in India by Hero Honda. The Achiever production started in 2006. It is based and shares Chassis and body parts of Hero Honda Ambition 135 platform.

== Hero Honda Achiever (BS3) ==
The Hero Honda Achiever engine is the same 149.1 cc (bore x stroke: 57.3 by 57.8 millimetres (2.26 in × 2.28 in)) Honda Unicorn engine, with a minuscule difference in power and equipped with Advanced Microprocessor Ignition System (AMI), Which was first introduced by Hero Honda in Hero Honda Ambition 135 Motorcycle. This Bike Equipped with Keihin Conventional CV Carburetor and Complies (BS3) emission norms Bharat stage emission standards . Production of this bike started in early 2006 but totally stopped in 2010 due to low sales.

== Hero Achiever (BS3) ==
Hero Honda restarted the production of the model as named Hero Achiever in 2011 due to the separation of Hero Honda joint venture in 2010, with some graphic variations & also sporting a black alloy wheel along with the same 149.1 cc engine and Complies (BS3) emission norms Bharat stage emission standards with new ATFT technology. Still Achiever struggles to compete the sales in market. Finally Hero Achiever discontinued in 2015.

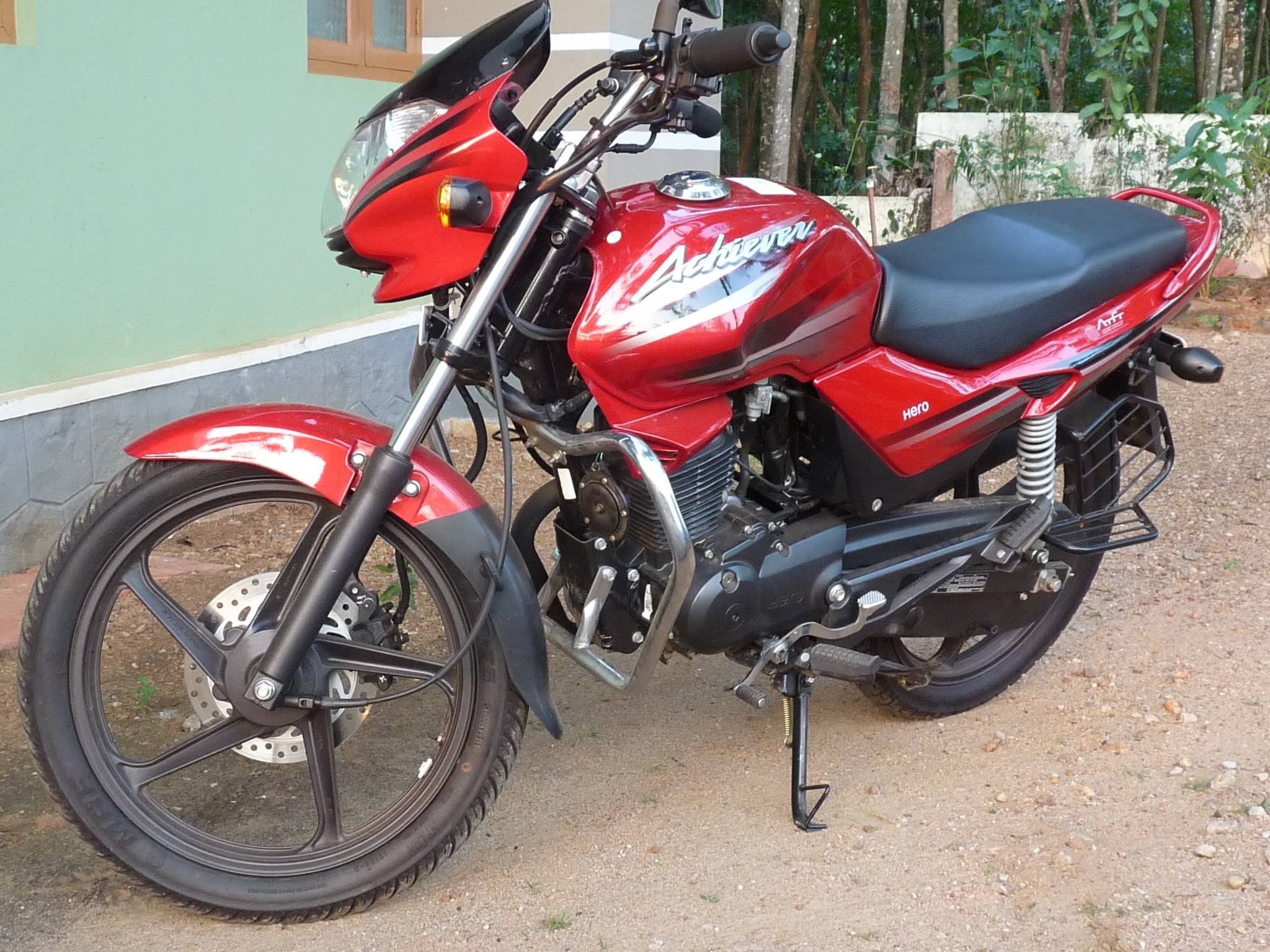
Hero Achiever 2012 Facelift

== Hero Achiever 150 (BS4) ==
Hero Achiever 150
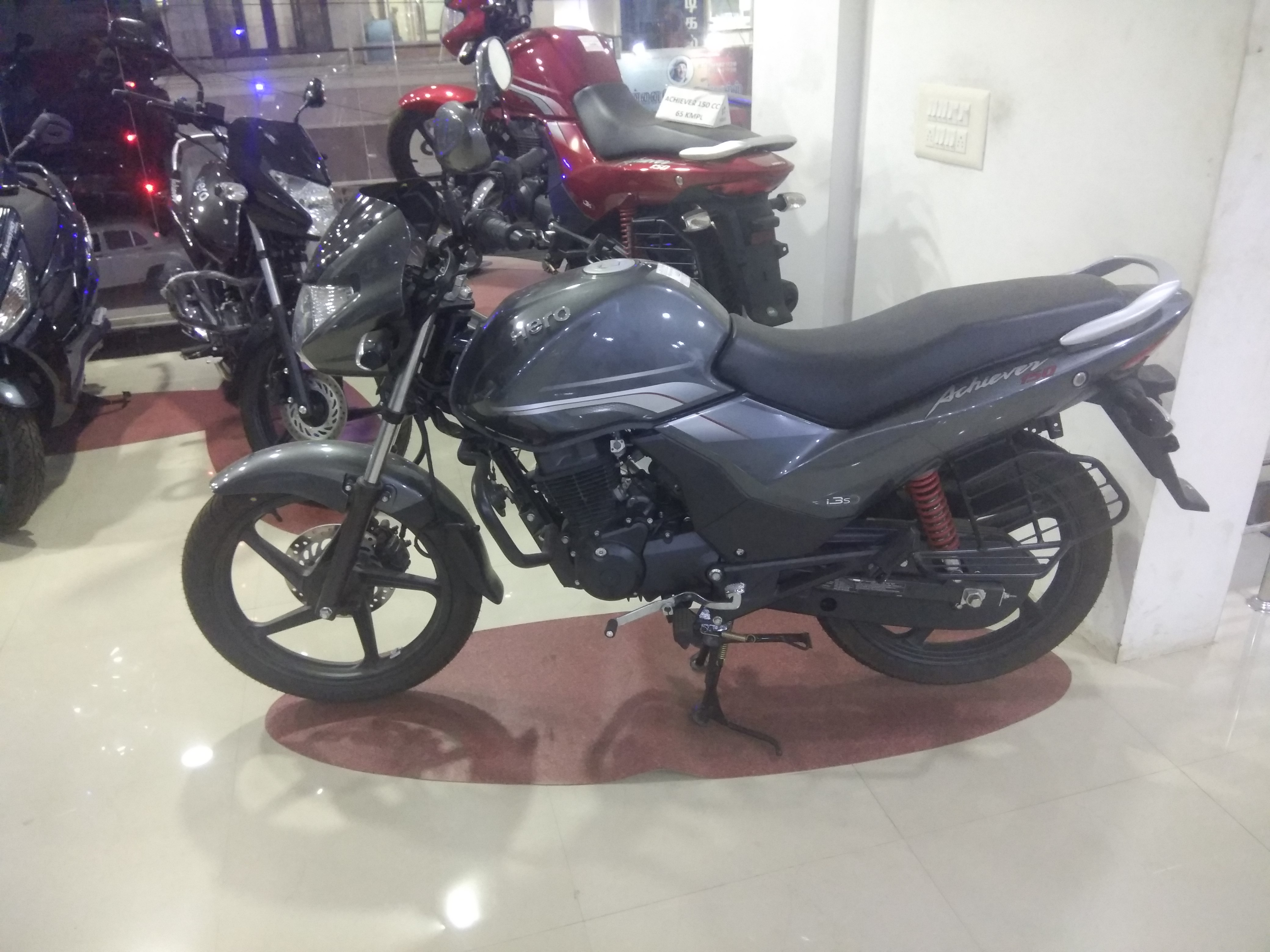
- Manufacturer: Hero Motocorp
- Parent company: Hero Motocorp, India
- Production: 2017-2019
- Predecessor: Hero Honda Achiever (2006-2010) and Hero Achiever (2011-2015)
- Class: Commuter
- Engine: 149.1 cc (9.10 cu in) 4-Stroke OHC Single-cylinder engine 2-Valve
- Bore / stroke: 57.3 mm × 57.8 mm (2.26 in × 2.28 in)
- Compression ratio: 9.1:1
- Top speed: 110Kmph
- Power: 13.4 HP@8000rpm
- Torque: 12.80 Nm@5000rpm
- Ignition type: Digital-DC CDI Ignition (AMI) Advanced Microprocessor Ignition
- Transmission: 5 speed constant mesh, chain
- Frame type: Tubular Diamond Type, Single Cradle Frame
- Suspension: Front: telescopic fork; Rear: swingarm
- Brakes: Front: 240 mm disc; Rear: 130 mm drum
- Tires: Front : 80/100-18 47P (Tubeless) and Rear : 80/100-18 54P (Tubeless)
- Wheelbase: 1,290 mm (51 in)
- Dimensions: L: 2,060 mm (81 in); W: 763 mm (30.0 in); H: 1,086 mm (42.8 in)
- Seat height: 805 mm (31.7 in)
- Weight: 139 kg (dry)
- Fuel capacity: 13 L (2.9 imp gal; 3.4 US gal), 1.8 L (0.40 imp gal; 0.48 US gal) Reserve
- Fuel consumption: 50Kmpl
- Turning radius: 2.05 m (6 ft 9 in); Hero, Motocorp. "Hero Achiever 150 Bike, Specs, Images, Price, Features, Achiever Mileage - Hero MotoCorp Ethiopia". www.heromotocorp.com.

In 2017 Hero again launched Achiever in new name as Hero Achiever 150 in India as a 2nd generation update with new design in headlight, new body panels with same chassis, engine and equipped i3s Idle Start Stop System with (BS4) emission norms Bharat stage emission standards complaint. Despite this, it was never a big hit in the market due to the increasing competition in the Indian market of 150 cc bikes. The Achiever was eventually deemed a failure and production ceased in 2019.

== Related ==
- Hero Honda CBZ
- Hero Honda Karizma
- Hero Honda Karizma R
- Hero Honda Karizma ZMR
- Hero Honda Ambition 135
- Hero Honda Splendor
- Hero Honda Passion
- Hero Honda Super Splendor
- Hero Honda Hunk
- Honda Unicorn
- Honda Shine
- Hero Honda Pleasure
- Honda Activa
