= Hero Honda Karizma R =

Karizma R sports bike manufactured by Hero Honda

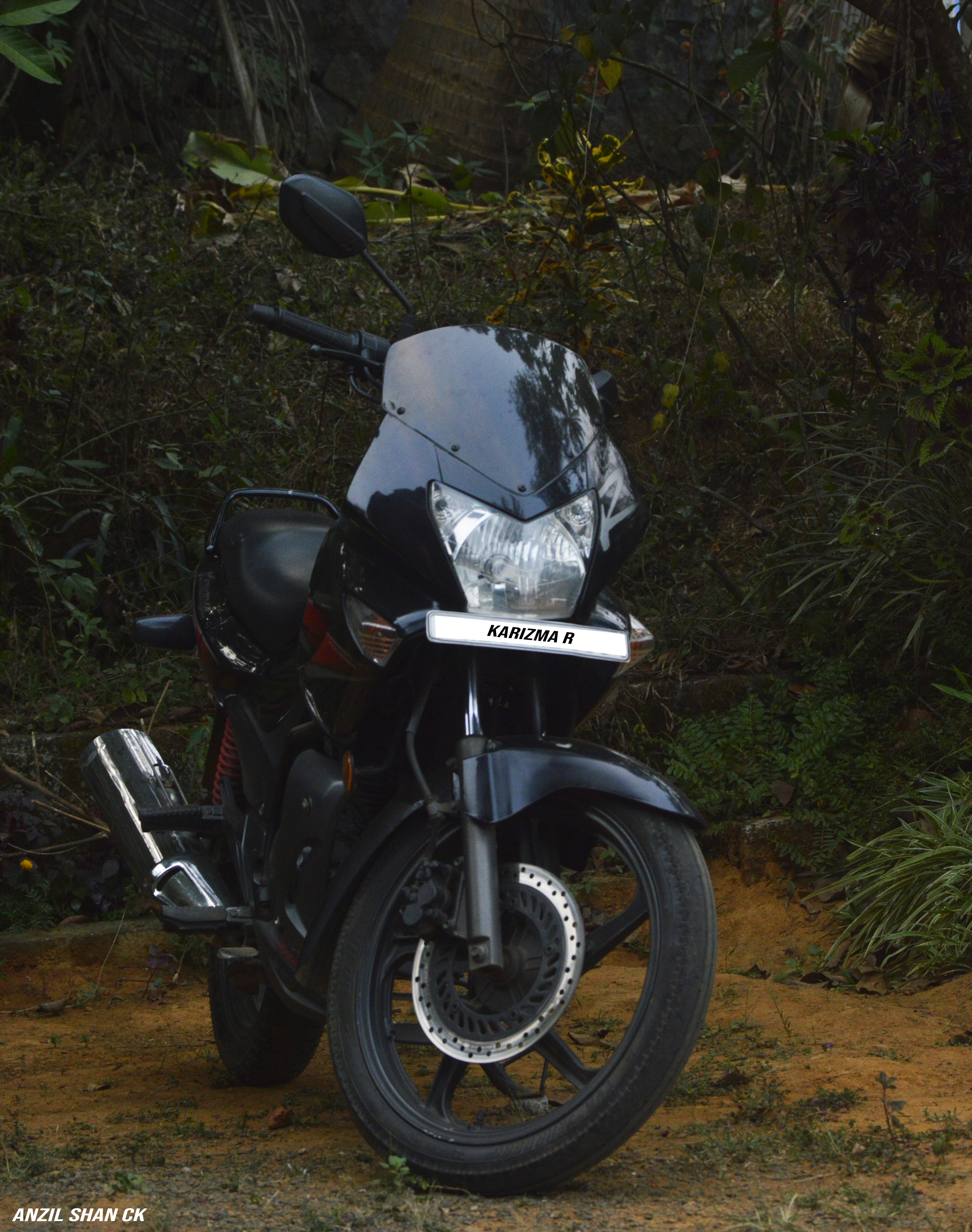
- Hero Honda Karizma R (2012 model)
- Manufacturer: Hero Honda (2007–2010); Hero Motocorp (2011–2017)
- Production: 2007 - 2017
- Predecessor: Hero Honda Karizma
- Successor: Hero Honda Karizma ZMR FI
- Class: Sport touring motorcycle
- Engine: 223 cc (13.6 cu in) air-cooled, four-stroke cycle, single, kick start / electric start
- Compression ratio: 9:1
- Top speed: 200 Kmph
- Power: 14.9 kW (20.0 hp) @ 10,000 rpm (claimed)
- Torque: 14.5 ft⋅lb (19.7 N⋅m) @ 6,500 rpm (claimed)
- Transmission: 5-speed
- Suspension: Front: Telescopic fork, 135 mm travel Rear: Swing arm
- Brakes: Front: 276 mm (disc); Rear: 130 mm (Drum brake)
- Tires: Front Tyre: 2.75 x 18 -42P and Rear Tyre: 100/90 x 18 - 56P
- Wheelbase: 1,355.00 mm
- Dimensions: L: 2,125.00 mm W: 755.00 mm H: 1,160.00 mm
- Fuel capacity: 15 litre (V2)
- Fuel consumption: 40 km/L
- Turning radius: 2.5m
- Related: Honda CRF230

The Hero Honda Karizma R is a semi-faired motorcycle launched as a successor of Hero Honda Karizma. It was launched in 2007 and was given a minor cosmetic update in 2011. In September 2009, it was supplemented by a full faired variant Karizma ZMR with Programmed fuel injection. After the separation of Hero Honda joint venture, They rebranded the same model in 2012 as Hero Karizma R and it got a generation update in 2014 with new styling, clip on handle bar setup and performance changes.

== Design and styling ==
Design elements remained the same as original Karizma

== Comfort and handling ==
Reviews have praised the handling of Karizma as "being easy for novice", "impeccable on straights and cornering" and as an "accomplished bike" in ride and handling. However the rear tyre, the handle bar and the foot pegs have been blamed in affecting the handling in the first models.

== Performance and fuel economy ==
Karizma has the Original Honda's tried and tested, but slightly detuned version of 223 cc SOHC air-cooled engine from the CRF230 series of enduro/MX/supermoto bikes that are sold in the US and South American markets. It has a five-speed gearbox in place of the CRF's six-speed. The engine is an all-aluminium, undersquare engine (bore 65.5 mm or 2.58 in and stroke 66.2 mm or 2.61 in) running a compression ratio of 9:1. It features a Kehlin CV carburettor with a CCVI switch. The top speed is around 130 km/h and the 0–60 km/h is achieved around 3.8 seconds. The Karizma is reported to have an overall fuel economy of 40 km/L (90 mpg or 2.4 L/100 km), with a best of 50 km/L (120 mpg) and a worst of 28 km/L (66 mpg).

== Related bikes ==
- Hero Honda Ambition 135
- Hero Honda Super Splendor
- Hero Honda Splendor
- Hero Honda Hunk
- Hero Passion
- Hero Pleasure
- Hero Honda Achiever
- Honda Shine
- Honda Unicorn
- Hero Honda CBZ
- Hero Honda Karizma
- Hero Honda Karizma ZMR
- Honda Activa
