= Tracy Putnam =

American medical researcher

- Born: April 14, 1894; Boston, Massachusetts, U.S.
- Died: March 29, 1975 (aged 80); New York City, U.S.
- Education: Harvard College; Harvard Medical School
- Known for: Co-discovering Dilantin
- Scientific career
- Fields: Neuroscience
- Workplaces: New York Neurological Institute

Tracy Jackson Putnam (April 14, 1894 – March 29, 1975) was an American neuroscientist and medical researcher. Among other things, he was a co-discoverer of Dilantin for controlling epilepsy.

== Education ==
Putnam graduated from Harvard College in 1915, and then from Harvard Medical School in 1920.

== Career ==
Putnam worked for the Boston City Hospital and in the New York Neurological Institute at Columbia University. He was promoted to director after his work with phenytoin (Dilantin). In 1938, people including himself and H. Houston Merritt discovered phenytoin's usefulness for controlling seizures, without the sedative effects associated with phenobarbital.

According to Goodman and Gilman's Pharmacological Basis of Therapeutics:

In contrast to the earlier accidental discovery of the antiseizure properties of potassium bromide and phenobarbital, phenytoin was the product of a search among nonsedative structural relatives of phenobarbital for agents capable of suppressing electroshock convulsions in laboratory animals.

At his time there were quotas for Jewish physicians. He opposed the existence of the quotas. He was forced to resign from Columbia in 1947, maybe because of this. However, other sources mention a "personal tragedy" Putnam went through at that time (presumably the death of his daughter, Lucy Washburn Putnam, on September 24, 1947), after which he resigned from Columbia and abandoned all scientific activities.

He treated Johnny Gunther for a brain tumor. Gunther’s eventual death from that tumor was written about by his father John Gunther in the 1949 book Death Be Not Proud.

In 1937, Putnam and Alexandra Adler conducted a study about multiple sclerosis. The study was conducted on the brain of a multiple sclerosis victim, and resulted in new information on how the disease affected the human body. Illustrations from the study are frequently used in medical literature.

Putnam was one of the first persons to propose, as early as the 1930s, a vascular cause for multiple sclerosis, resurrecting the previous works of Eduard von Rindfleisch. The idea remained obscure until the syndrome of chronic cerebrospinal venous insufficiency (CCSVI) was associated with multiple sclerosis in 2008.

In 1963 Putnam had a small role in the science-fiction movie The Slime People. He played a scientist and was not listed in the credits.
