= Honda CB Trigger =

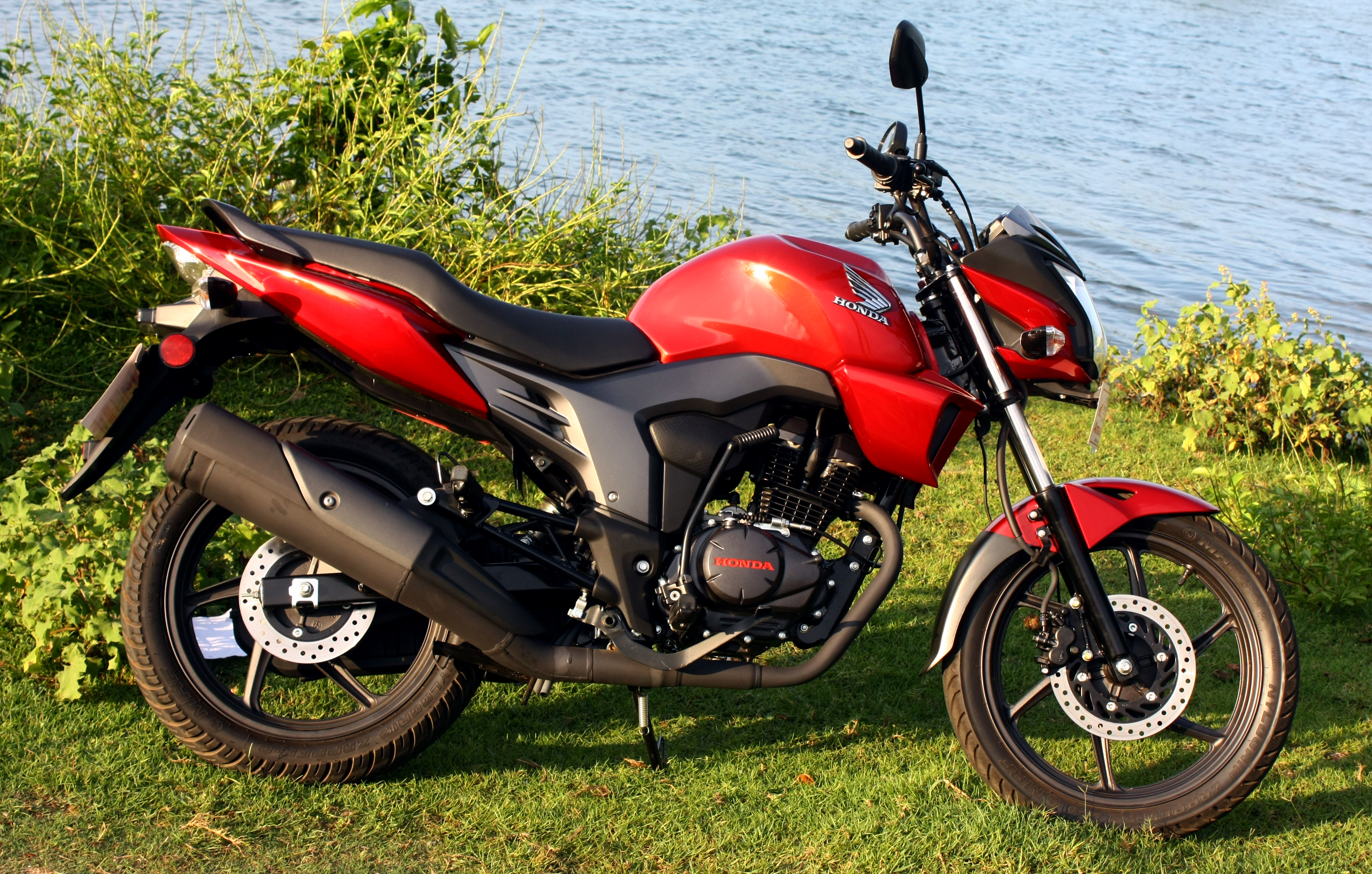
- Manufacturer: Honda Motorcycle and Scooter India
- Also called: Honda CB150
- Parent company: Honda
- Production: 2013–2015 in Indian market 2013– still available in Bangladeshi market.
- Predecessor: Honda CB Dazzler/Unicorn
- Successor: Honda CB Hornet 160R
- Class: Standard
- Engine: 149.1 cc (9.10 cu in) CV carburetor, 4-stroke, air-cooled, OHC, single
- Bore / stroke: 57.3 mm × 57.8 mm (2.26 in × 2.28 in)
- Top speed: 127 km/h (79 mph)
- Power: 14.35 bhp (10.70 kW) @ 8500 rpm
- Torque: 12.5 N⋅m (9.2 lb⋅ft) @ 6500 rpm
- Ignition type: CDI
- Transmission: 5-speed, constant mesh.
- Suspension: Front Telescopic; Rear Monoshock
- Brakes: Front 240 mm disc Rear 220 mm disc
- Tires: Tubeless, Front 80/100-17; Rear 110/80-17
- Wheelbase: 1,325 mm (52.2 in)
- Dimensions: L: 2,045 mm (80.5 in); W: 757 mm (29.8 in); H: 1,060 mm (42 in)
- Weight: n/a (dry); 137 kg (302 lb) (wet)
- Fuel capacity: 12 L (3.2 US gal) (reserve 1.3 L (0.34 US gal))
- Fuel consumption: 42.3 to 61.9 km/L (99 to 146 mpg_{‑US})
- Related: Honda Verza

Honda CB Trigger or CB150 is a 150 cc single cylinder four-stroke engine motorcycle developed by Honda Motorcycle and Scooter India and introduced in 2013. The motorcycle is known as Trigger in the Indian, Sri Lankan and Bangladeshi markets. The bike is featured with advanced Combined braking system (CBS), digital instrumental panel and viscous air filter, LED tail lamps and alloy-wheels. It replaced the Unicorn Dazzler. Trigger is available in black, meteor green metallic, pearl siena red and pearl sunbeam white colors.

In 2015, the bike was replaced by the 160 cc CB Hornet 160R.
