= Inside U.S.A. (book) =

1947 book by John Gunther

- Cover of the first edition (1947)
- Author: John Gunther
- Publisher: Harper & Brothers
- Publication date: May 1947
- Pages: 979
- ISBN: 978-1-56584-358-5

Inside U.S.A. is a nonfiction book by John Gunther, first published in 1947 and one of that year's best-selling nonfiction books in the United States. It describes the author's observations during 13 months of travel through the then-48 U.S. states beginning in November 1944.

== Development of the book ==
Inside U.S.A. was the fourth in a series of highly successful "Inside" books written by Gunther. The series began in 1936 with Inside Europe, based on Gunther's experience as a journalist in Europe and described as "a cross between reportage and armchair travel literature." The book sold over 500,000 copies. It was followed by Inside Asia in 1939 and Inside Latin America in 1941.

Gunther started to plan Inside U.S.A. as early as 1936, when his idea was to create a two-part book, with the first part focused on the power structure of Washington, DC, and the second part a "snapshot" of the entirety of the United States. He did not begin serious work on the project until 1944, by which time his plan was to write about America from the perspective of an outsider. After living outside the country for more than a decade, he considered himself to have become an outsider. He joked that he was "writing for the man from Mars" and that he also was from Mars. In November 1944, after studying U.S. statistics, signing a book contract with a publisher and a second contract under which Reader's Digest would publish excerpts while he was still writing, and sending a list of questions and interview requests to the governor of every state, he set out to tour the country and interview its prominent citizens, including business leaders, politicians, writers, and academics.

Gunther's journey took him to more than 300 communities in all 48 states, including 38 of the 43 U.S. cities that had populations greater than 200,000. By the time of the trip, Gunther was very well known as a journalist and author. His celebrity status not only gave him unusual access to many prominent people, but it also caused his travels to receive a great deal of public attention. Local newspapers often covered his visits in front-page news stories. Some civic leaders and politicians who had not been asked to give interviews sought him out in hopes that their perspectives would not be omitted from his book. Gunther became so engrossed in the project that in April 1945 he declined an opportunity to go to Europe just before V-E Day, even though he had spent a significant part of his journalism career as a foreign correspondent in Europe, covering the situations and events that led up to World War II.

An external event that did slow the process of writing the book was the fatal illness of Gunther's teenage son Johnny. In April 1946, Johnny was found to have a malignant brain tumor. Gunther managed to continue writing through his son's illness, which he was later to chronicle in the book Death Be Not Proud.

Inside U.S.A. grew much longer than originally planned, which presented a problem because paper was in short supply in the postwar period. When published in May 1946, it totaled 979 pages. The first U.S. printing run was more than 500,000 copies, including 35,000 copies for the book's British publishing house, Hamish Hamilton, which was unable to obtain enough paper to print the book in England.

== Content ==
The book is divided into 52 chapters, organized by geography. Its geographical structure begins in California, continues through other western states to the Great Plains and Midwest, then east to the Northeast and Southeast, then west to Texas and Oklahoma, and finally to the "new states" of New Mexico and Arizona. Factual information about topics like geography, population, and history is commingled with highly opinionated statements (Arthur Schlesinger, Jr. called some of these opinions "flip judgments") about United States places and people. According to Gunther, Southern California was "the California of petroleum, crazy religious cults, the citrus industry, ... the weirdest architecture in the United States, ... and devotees of funny money", and a place where "climate is worshipped as a god". Gunther described Phoenix, Arizona as the "cleanest city" he saw and Indianapolis as "the dirtiest." He called Knoxville, Tennessee, "an extremely puritanical town" and the "ugliest city" he saw. (The remarks about Indianapolis' dirtiness and Knoxville's ugliness spurred both of these cities to start beautification efforts and led Knoxville to establish the annual Dogwood Arts Festival.) He said that the "best beef" he ate was in Montana, the "best single meal" in Milwaukee, and the "best ice cream" in Richmond, Virginia.

Regarding government and politics, Gunther described New York as the "best-governed" state and Wisconsin and Vermont as the two states with the "cleanest politics", while he said Pennsylvania had the "dirtiest politics" and any of the southern states "below Mason's and Dixon's line" could qualify as "worst-governed". In a three-page profile of California governor Earl Warren, he described him as "honest, likable and clean" and someone "with the limitations of all Americans of his type with little intellectual background ... or coherent political philosophy" who would "never set the world on fire". (Gunther was later to call his characterization of Warren, who was to become the Chief Justice of the U.S. Supreme Court, "the most serious misjudgment of a personality I have ever made.")

== Reception ==
Inside U.S.A. was the Book-of-the-Month Club main selection for June 1947 and ranked third among the best-selling nonfiction books in the U.S. for the full year.

== Revised Edition (1951) ==
Harper published Gunther’s updated edition in 1951. In its preface, Gunther noted that back in 1947 “There was no Marshall Plan….and few outside their own circles knew the names Alger Hiss or Whittaker Chambers….We did not know in 1947 that Congress would soon vote the unification of the armed services…and that Mr. Truman would soon disclose the possession of the atomic bomb secret by the Soviet Union….and that South Korea would provoke one of the most unpleasant wars on record by invading South Korea on June 25, 1950.” In the intervening four years the author had revisited all 48 U.S. states: “The new writing in this edition…probably runs to 40,000 words, and there are no fewer than 10,000 textual changes.” The book's length had grown from 979 to 1121 pages. The first edition’s geographical routing was retained, now occupying 48 chapters. Many chapter names were carryovers; some were entirely new, with others serving as updates—“Hague Machine and New Jersey” becoming “New Jersey After Hague.”

== Follow-on works ==
The book inspired and gave its name to a 1948 Broadway musical revue, Inside U.S.A., that was very loosely based on the book.

Gunther intended to write a companion book, to be titled Inside Washington, focused on the nation-scale problems, personalities, and institutions of the U.S. He never completed the second book, because of the amount that would be required and because he could not decide how best to coordinate the publication timing with the quadrennial cycle of presidential elections. A revised edition of Inside U.S.A. was released in 1951. He later continued his "Inside" series with three more books: Inside Africa in 1955, Inside Russia Today in 1958, and Inside Europe Today in 1961. A 50th anniversary edition of Inside U.S.A. was published in 1997 (ISBN 978-1-56584-358-5).

In the 1960s, writer Neal R. Peirce decided to undertake a project similar to Gunther's, with the aim of updating the account of America that Gunther had provided in Inside U.S.A. After consulting with Gunther, who agreed on the need for an updated book, in 1969 Peirce began a series of trips to each of the 50 states, interviewing state and local leaders as well as "plain people". The single book that Peirce originally planned grew to become a series of nine "States of America" books published between 1971 and 1980.
