= Honda Verza =

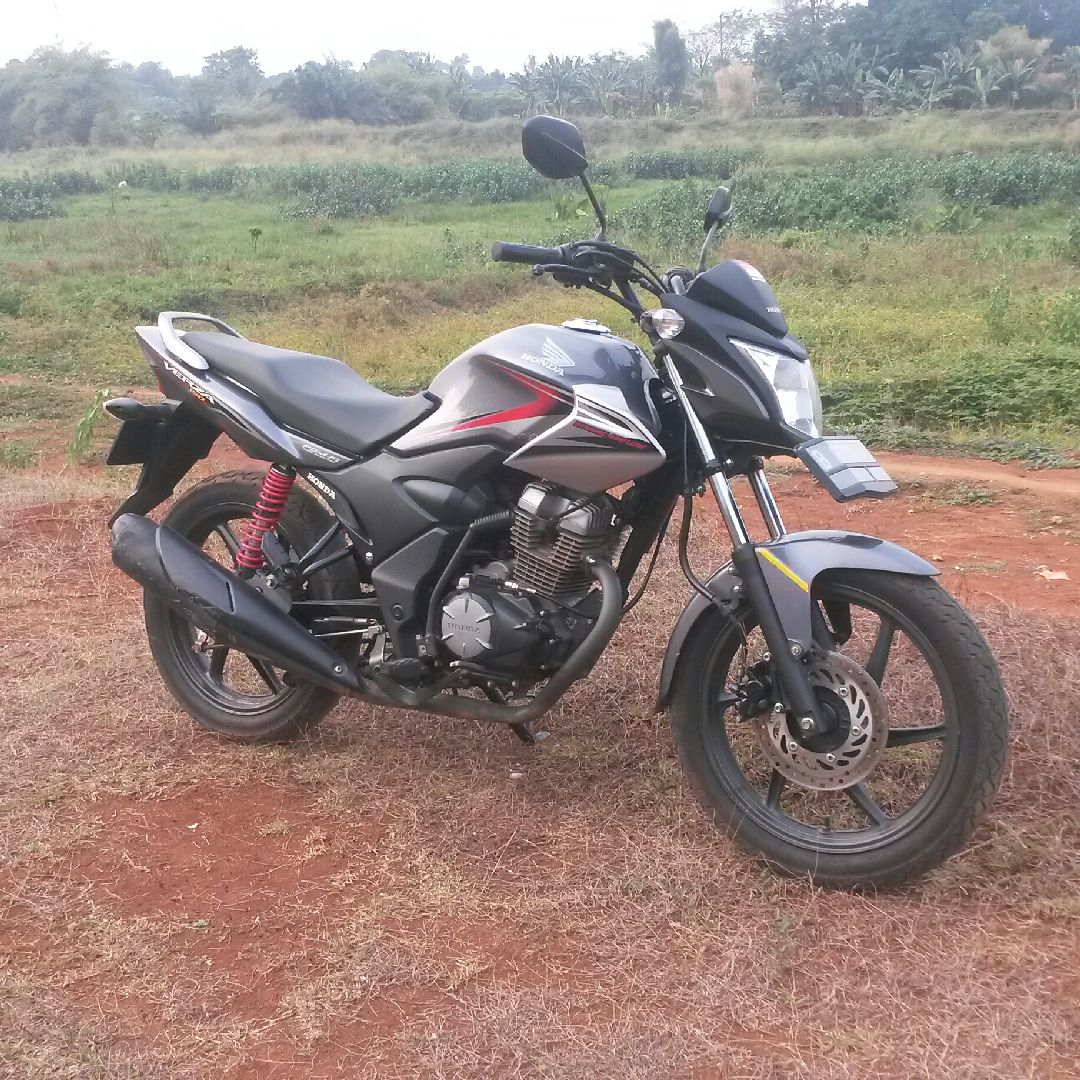
- 2013 Honda Verza 150
- Manufacturer: Astra Honda Motor
- Also called: Honda CB150 Verza (2018–present)
- Parent company: Honda Motor Company
- Production: 2013 – Present
- Assembly: Indonesia: Karawang, West Java (Astra Honda Motor)
- Predecessor: Honda MegaPro 1600 (Indonesia)
- Class: Standard; Naked bike
- Related: Honda Unicorn; Honda CB Trigger

The Honda Verza (known as CB150 Verza since 2018) is a 150 cc (9.2 cu in) single-cylinder standard/naked bike motorcycle made by Astra Honda Motor in Indonesia since 2013. It is the stripped-down counterpart of the CB Trigger and Unicorn, two related motorcycles sold in India, lacking some features of the Trigger and Unicorn.

The Verza is positioned below the more expensive CB150R StreetFire in Astra Honda Motor's sport motorcycles lineup, and intended for more economical purposes rather than performance outlook.

== History ==
The Verza was introduced by Honda in January 2013 as the cheaper alternative to the CB150R StreetFire. The second iteration, called CB150 Verza, was launched in February 2018. This model has a retro-styling approach rather than modern approach from the previous model.

=== 2013–2018 ===
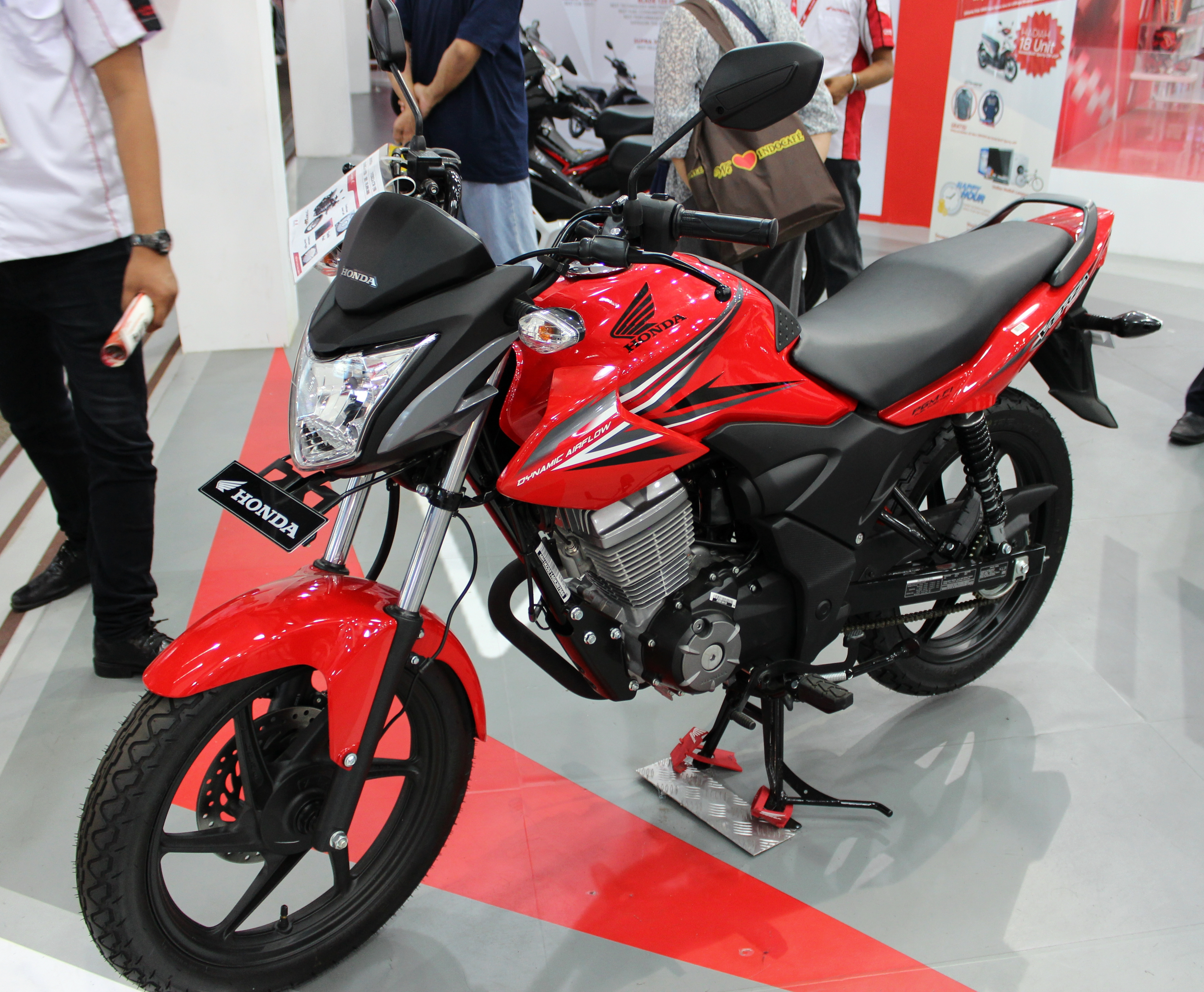
2016 Honda Verza

The Verza was introduced in January 2013. The engine is claimed to have a maximum power output of 9.72 kW (13.0 hp; 13.2 PS) @ 8,500 rpm and maximum torque of 12.7 N⋅m (9.4 lbf⋅ft) @ 6,000 rpm. It is also claimed to have a 0–200 m (656.2 ft) acceleration in 11.5 seconds and a top speed of 110 km/h (68.4 mph).

In August 2015, the Verza received a minor cosmetic update, such as chromed exhaust cover, black (previously red) rear shocks and carbon fiber-look instrument panel background.

==== Performance ====
Parameter	Result
Top speed (on speedometer)	115 km/h (71.5 mph)
Fuel consumption	50.4 km/L (142.4 mpg_{‑imp}; 118.5 mpg_{‑US})

=== 2018–present ===
In February 2018, Astra Honda Motor released an updated version of the Verza, called CB150 Verza. The update consists of circular headlamp, digital instrument panel and reworked side shroud. The engine remains the same as the previous model, though produces less power and more torque instead.

== Specifications ==
Specification	2013–2018 (Verza 150)	2018–present (CB150 Verza)
Engine & transmission
Layout	4-stroke 2-valve SOHC single-cylinder	
Capacity	149.15 cc (9.1 cu in)	
Bore × stroke	57.3 mm × 57.8 mm (2.26 in × 2.28 in)	
Compression ratio	9.5:1	
Cooling system	Air-cooled	
Carburation	PGM-FI fuel injection	
Starter	Electric and kick	
Maximum power	9.72 kW (13.0 hp; 13.2 PS) @ 8,500 rpm (claimed)	9.59 kW (12.9 hp; 13.0 PS) @ 8,500 rpm (claimed)
Maximum torque	12.7 N⋅m (9.4 lbf⋅ft) @ 6,000 rpm (claimed)	12.73 N⋅m (9.4 lbf⋅ft) @ 6,000 rpm (claimed)
Transmission	5-speed constant mesh	
Final drive	Chain	
Cycle parts & suspension
Frame	Steel diamond	
Front suspension	Conventional 31 mm (1.2 in) telescopic fork	
Front tyre	80/100–17	
Front brakes	Single 240 mm (9.4 in) disc with axially-mounted 2-piston caliper	
Rear suspension	Steel swingarm with dual shocks	Steel swingarm with adjustable dual shocks
Rear tyre	100/90–17	
Rear brakes	Drum	
ABS	N/A	
Dimensions
Length	2,056 mm (80.9 in)	
Width	742 mm (29.2 in)	
Height	1,054 mm (41.5 in)	
Seat height	773 mm (30.4 in)	
Wheelbase	1,318 mm (51.9 in)	
Ground clearance	156 mm (6.1 in)	
Dry weight	129 kg (284 lb)	128 kg (282 lb) (spoke wheel); 129 kg (284 lb) (cast wheel)
Fuel capacity	12.2 L (2.7 imp gal; 3.2 US gal)	
