= Haunted Heart (Renée Fleming album) =

Studio album by Renée Fleming
- Released: October 2005
- Genre: Jazz
- Label: Decca Records
- Producer: Elliot Scheiner

Haunted Heart is a jazz album by Renée Fleming with pianist Fred Hersch and guitarist Bill Frisell.

The title track is a 1948 song by Arthur Schwartz (music) and Howard Dietz (lyrics) which was the main hit from the musical revue Inside U.S.A..

== Track listing ==
1. Haunted Heart – Howard Dietz, Arthur Schwartz
2. River – Joni Mitchell
3. When Did You Leave Heaven? – Walter Bullock, Richard A. Whiting
4. You've Changed – Bill Carey, Carl Fischer
5. Answer Me – English lyrics by Carl Sigman, original German song by Gerhard Winkler and Fred Rauch
6. My Cherie Amour – Henry Cosby, Stevie Wonder
7. In My Life – John Lennon, Paul McCartney
8. The Moon's A Harsh Mistress – Jimmy Webb
9. Wozzeck - Alban Berg / Improvisation - Fred Hersch / The Midnight Sun – J. Francis Burke, Lionel Hampton
10. Liebst du um Schonheit (Rückert Lieder No. 5) Mahler
11. My One and Only Love – Mack Gordon Robert Mellin / This Is Always - Harry Warren, Guy Wood
12. Cançao do Amor, for voice & orchestra (arranged from pt:A Floresta do Amazonas), A. 546 Dora Vasconcellos, Heitor Villa-Lobos
13. Psyché – Emile Paladilhe
14. Hard Times Come Again No More – Stephen Foster

== Charts ==
Chart (2005)	Peak position
France	195
