= Inside U.S.A. (musical) =

- Music: Arthur Schwartz
- Lyrics: Howard Dietz
- Book: Arnold M. Auerbach; Moss Hart; Arnold B. Horwitt
- Basis: Book by John Gunther
- Productions: 1948 Broadway

Inside U.S.A. is a musical revue by Arthur Schwartz (music) and Howard Dietz (lyrics). It was loosely based on the book Inside U.S.A. by John Gunther. Sketches were written by Arnold M. Auerbach, Moss Hart, and Arnold B. Horwitt.

After a tryout in Philadelphia at the Shubert Theatre in March 1948, the revue opened on Broadway at the New Century Theatre the following month and transferred to the Majestic Theatre in September. It closed in February 1949 after a total of 399 performances. It returned to Philadelphia in March 1949.

== Production ==
After a three-week tryout in Philadelphia at the Shubert Theatre starting with the world premiere on March 29, 1948, the revue opened on Broadway at the New Century Theatre on April 30, 1948, transferred to the Majestic Theatre on September 23, 1948, and closed on February 19, 1949, after a total of 399 performances. The show then returned to Philadelphia for two weeks at the Shubert Theatre, with Beatrice Lillie and Jack Haley, starting March 14, 1949.

The sketches were directed by Robert H. Gordon, dances and Musical numbers were staged by Helen Tamiris, the production design was by Lemuel Ayers, costume design was by Eleanor Goldsmith, Beatrice Lillie's costumes and gowns were by Castillo and mask design was by John Robert Lloyd. The cast included Jack Haley, Beatrice Lillie, Valerie Bettis, Talley Beatty, Jack Cassidy, John Tyers, Jane Lawrence, Carl Reiner, and Nellie Hill.

The show's production cost of $235,000 was paid off in 29 weeks. From each week's gross receipts, $500 was paid to author John Gunther for the use of his book's title.

== Synopsis ==
The revue consists of a number of sketches related only in that they generally focus on a particular State. The opening is a serenade to the United States by the company ("Inside USA"). Lillie provides a "mocking madrigal" that praises the industry in Pittsburgh ("Come, Oh Come to Pittsburgh"). A woman loses her boyfriend to the horses at Churchill Downs ("Blue Grass"). In one sketch, a superstitious maid unnerves an actress on a Broadway opening night, using a ouija board and numerology (written by Moss Hart). New Orleans is featured in "At The Mardi Gras", with Lillie as the Queen. Wisconsin is featured in "First Prize At The Fair." Lillie and Haley, costumed as New Mexico Indians, declare "We Won't Take It Back." The romantic "Rhode Island Is Famous For You" turns into a ragtime number and names the most famous products of various states. In the Western number "My Gal Is Mine Once More" a cowboy celebrates remarriage to his first wife. Haley teaches apprentice waiters to make dining customers unhappy. Lillie is the "priggish, unimaginative leader of a choral society" and a mermaid with a strange romantic life. Herb Shriner, without harmonica, provides a wry Western themed monologue as "A Feller from Indiana."

== Songs (partial) ==
Sources: Playbill Vault;

- Inside USA - Company
- Leave My Pulse Alone (Any Town, Coast-to-Coast) - Carl Reiner, Jack Haley and company
- Come, Oh Come to Pittsburgh - Beatrice Lillie
- Forty Winks (Miami Beach) - Jack Haley, William LeMassena, Louis Nye, Carl Reiner
- Blue Grass (Churchill Downs, Kentucky) - Thelma Carpenter (singer), Albert Popwell (dancer) and company
- A Song to Forget (Chillicothe, Ohio) - Beatrice Lillie, Carl Reiner and company
- Rhode Island Is Famous For You - Estelle Loring and Jack Haley
- Haunted Heart (San Francisco) - John Tyers (singer), Valerie Bettis and company (dancers)
- Massachusetts Mermaid - Beatrice Lillie
- A Feller From Indiana - Herb Shriner
- First Prize At The Fair (Wisconsin) - Beatrice Lilly and Jack Haley; Jane Lawrence and Ray Stephens; Estelle Loring and Jack Hawthorne; William LeMassena
- At The Mardi Gras
- My Gal Is Mine Once More
- Atlanta
- Protect Me (cut)

The biggest success from the musical was Haunted Heart, with which Perry Como and Jo Stafford had hit recordings. It was also the title track of a 2005 album by Renee Fleming.

Blossom Dearie recorded "Rhode Island is Famous For You" as did Rebecca Kilgore, among others.

== Critical response ==
Reviews were favorable from Brooks Atkinson of The New York Times ("keen and impeccable") and Robert Coleman of the Daily Mirror ("a handsome hit"). However, the only song that became a hit was Haunted Heart. A strike by ASCAP delayed the recording and radio play from the show, which may have been the reason for the lack of more hit songs. The Time Magazine reviewer wrote that the revue was the "least enjoyable Bea Lillie show in a long time. Not that it is really bad or botched: it is all thoroughly professional. It is also thoroughly unoriginal and unexhilarating; it not only fails to shed light of its own, but even dims the cherished Lillie luster."

== Awards and nominations ==
- 1948 Theatre World Award

Valerie Bettis (winner)
Estelle Loring (winner)

== Television ==
A television show titled Inside U.S.A. with Chevrolet, was based on this revue, with music, comedy, and dance that showed different states. The TV show aired on the CBS network from September 29, 1949, through March 16, 1950, with Schwartz and Dietz providing original music and Peter Lind Hayes the Master of Ceremonies, with name guest stars. Margaret O'Brien was the first guest and Joan Blondell the last, with Lucille Ball and Ethel Merman also guesting.

== Recording ==
Inside U.S.A.'s original cast recording was recorded before the production was fully cast in order to beat the 1948 ASCAP strike. The 1948 musical revue 'Inside U.S.A.' was commemorated with a 78 rpm album consisting of four records released by RCA Victor Records featuring the show's principals, Beatrice Lillie and Jack Haley, as well as performances by non-cast member Billy Williams and Perry Como's hit recording of "Haunted Heart." Russ Cass and his Orchestra provided the music.
