= Foix–Alajouanine syndrome =

- Other names: Familial osteosclerosis with abnormalities of the nervous system and meninges
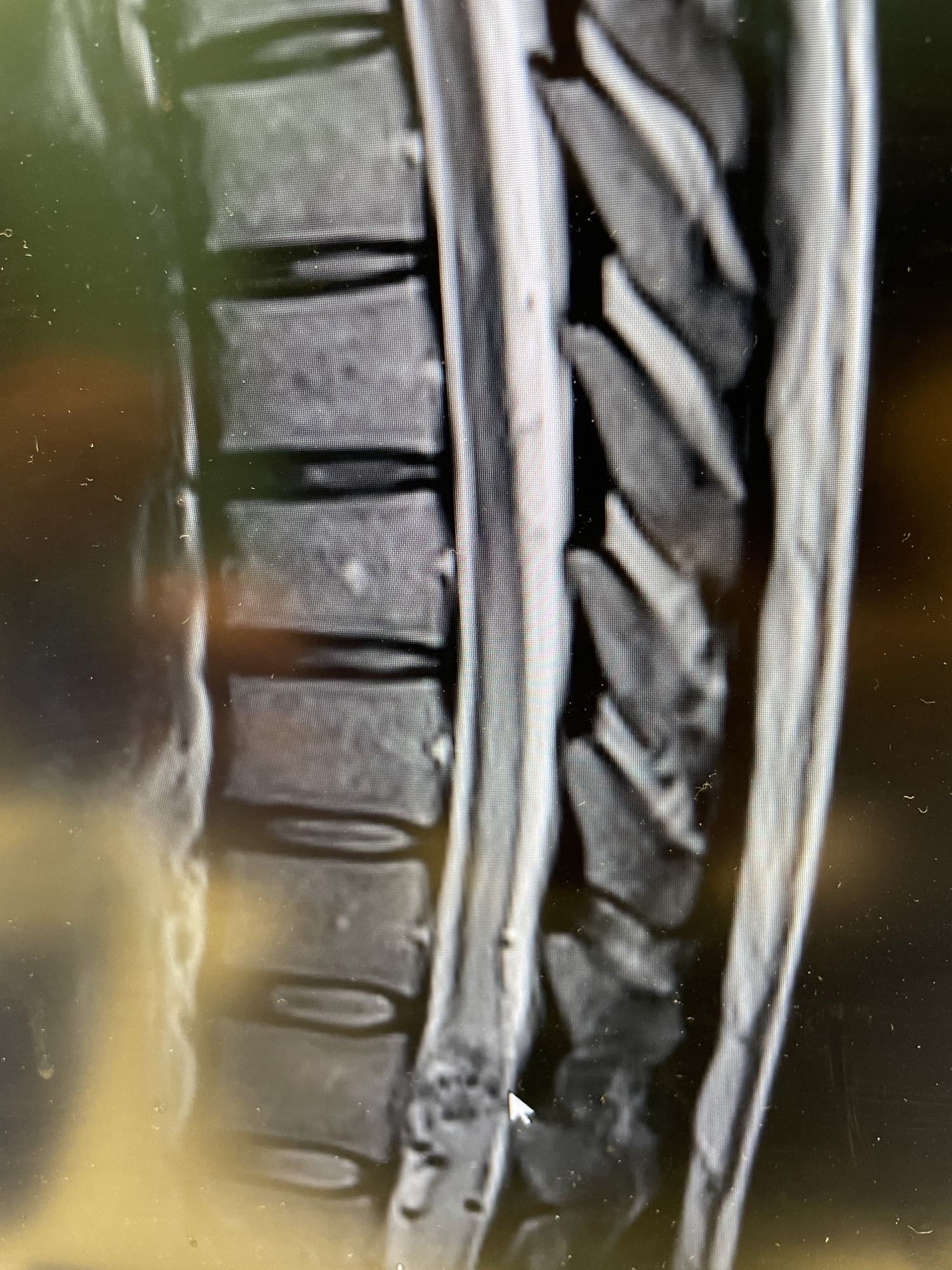
- T2 weighted MRI showing an arteriovenous malformation indicated by the cursor
- Specialty: Neurology

Foix–Alajouanine syndrome, also called subacute ascending necrotizing myelitis, is a disease caused by an arteriovenous malformation of the spinal cord. In particular, most cases involve dural arteriovenous malformations that present in the lower thoracic or lumbar spinal cord. The condition is named after Charles Foix and Théophile Alajouanine who first described the condition in 1926.

== Signs and symptoms ==
The patients can present with symptoms indicating spinal cord involvement such as (paralysis of arms and legs, numbness and loss of sensation and sphincter dysfunction), and pathological examination reveals disseminated nerve cell death in the spinal cord.

== Diagnosis ==
Clinically, the patient may present with neurological symptoms such as numbness, weakness, loss of reflexes, or even sudden or progressive paralysis. The affected portion of the body will correlate to where the lesion lies within the spinal cord. The disease typically has an insidious onset, but symptoms may manifest suddenly. A thorough physical exam may lead a physician toward targeted imaging, with MRI being the most appropriate imaging modality for initial diagnosis. A spinal MRA will serve as a superior imaging technique to visualize the extent of the arteriovenous malformation within the cord and may be especially useful if surgical treatment is attempted.

== Treatment ==
Surgical treatment may be attempted with endovascular embolization or ligation of the arteriovenous malformation within the spinal cord. Corticosteroids may be used acutely to help slow the progression of symptoms or they may be used chronically in a poor surgical candidate. In either case, physical therapy will be an important part of the recovery process in helping the patient regain strength and coordination.

== See also ==
- Vascular myelopathy
