= Vascular myelopathy =

- Specialty: Neurology
- Complications: necrosis

Vascular myelopathy (vascular disease of the spinal cord) refers to an abnormality of the spinal cord in regard to its blood supply. The blood supply is complicated and supplied by two major vessel groups: the posterior spinal arteries and the anterior spinal arteries—of which the Artery of Adamkiewicz is the largest. Both the posterior and anterior spinal arteries run the entire length of the spinal cord and receive anastomotic (conjoined) vessels in many places. The anterior spinal artery has a less efficient supply of blood and is therefore more susceptible to vascular disease. Whilst atherosclerosis of spinal arteries is rare, necrosis (death of tissue) in the anterior artery can be caused by disease in vessels originating from the segmental arteries such as atheroma (arterial wall swelling) or aortic dissection (a tear in the aorta).

== Spinal cord infarction ==
=== Anterior spinal artery syndrome ===
Anterior spinal artery syndrome is necrosis of tissue in the anterior spinal artery or its branches. It is characterised by pain which radiates at onset and sudden quadraplegia (paralysis of all four limbs) or paraplegia (paralysis of the lower body). Within days, flaccid limbs become spastic and hyporeflexia (underactive nerve responses) turns into hyperreflexia (overactive nerve responses) and extensor plantar nerve responses. Sensory loss to pain and temperature also occurs up to the level of damage on the spinal cord, as damage to different areas will affect different parts of the body.

In diagnosis, other causes of abrupt paralysis should be excluded such as cord compression, transverse myelitis (inflammation of the spinal cord) and Guillain–Barré syndrome. A specific cause of the infarction should be looked for, such as diabetes, polyarteritis nodosa (inflammatory damage of vessels) or systemic lupus erythematosus. Neurosyphilis is also a known cause. Other causes include:

Type of disease	Causes
Small blood vessel	Diabetes, polyarteritis nodosa, systemic lupus erythematosus, neurosyphilis
Arterial compression or occlusion	Extradural tumors, aortic dissection, disk fragmentation, aortic surgery
Embolic occlusion	Decompression sickness, aortic arteriography
Hypotensive	Myocardial infarction

Treatment is supportive and aims to relieve symptoms. The prognosis is dependent upon individual circumstances and factors.

=== Posterior spinal artery syndrome ===
Posterior spinal artery syndrome is much rarer than its anterior counterpart as the white matter structures that are present are much less vulnerable to ischemia since they have a better blood supply. When posterior spinal artery syndrome does occur, dorsal columns are damaged and ischemia may spread into the posterior horns. Clinically the syndrome presents as a loss of tendon reflexes and loss of joint position sense

=== Transient ischemic attack ===
Transient ischemic attacks (TIAs) rarely affect the spinal cord and usually affect the brain; however, cases have been documented in these areas. Spinal arteriovenous malformations are the main cause and are represented later in this article. However, TIAs can result from emboli in calcific aortic disease and aortic coarctation.

== Spinal arteriovenous malformations ==
Spinal arteriovenous malformations (AVMs, or angiomatous malformations) are congenital (from birth) abnormalities of blood vessels. Arteries that directly communicate with veins bypass the capillary network (which has not yet developed) and thus creates a shunt. AVMs appear as a mass of convoluted, dilated vessels. In regards to the spinal cord, they are usually located in the thoracolumbar region (between the thoracic and lumbar regions, 60% of the time), as opposed to the upper thoracic (20%) and cervical regions (approximately 15%). Cervical malformations arise from the anterior spinal artery and lie within the cord, whereas thoracolumbar malformations can be internal, external or encompass both areas of the cord.

Malformations can be recognised as part of an acute illness or gradual onset disease. In diseases such as subarachnoid hemorrhage, signs and symptoms include headache, neck stiffness and back and leg pain. Extradural, subdural and intramedullary hematomas are all signs of acute cord compression. Gradual onset diseases are more common (85-90% of all diseases leading to a diagnosis of malformation) and are usually due to an increased venous pressure. Other factors such as thrombosis or arachnoiditis can be involved. A bruit (unusual blood sounds) may be heard overlying the spinal arteriovenous malformation. Very occasionally, nevus (moles) or angiolipomas are found.

Myelography is used to confirm the diagnosis of AVMs and it shows 'snake-like' vessels on the cord's surface. If the myelogram is positive, angiography is required to show the extent of malformation and the exact site of the shunt. Magnetic resonance imaging (MRI) may show the appropriate area. If AVMs are left untreated, 50% of patients with gradual symptoms will be unable to walk within 3 years of onset. Surgical occlusion has been shown to halt the progression and may improve any gait or incontinence.

== See also ==
- Foix–Alajouanine syndrome
- Chronic cerebrospinal venous insufficiency
- Peripheral vascular disease
