= John Gunther =

American journalist (1901–1970)

- Born: John Guenther; August 30, 1901; Lakeview, Chicago, Illinois, United States
- Died: May 29, 1970 (aged 68)
- Education: University of Chicago (BPhil)
- Occupations: Journalist, author
- Notable work: Inside U.S.A (1947); Death Be Not Proud (1949)
- Spouses: Frances Fineman (m. 1927; div. 1944) Jane Perry Vandercook (m. 1948)
- Children: 3

John Gunther (August 30, 1901 – May 29, 1970) was an American journalist and writer.

His success came primarily by a series of popular sociopolitical works, known as the "Inside" books (1936–1972), including the best-selling Inside U.S.A. in 1947. However, he is now best known for his memoir Death Be Not Proud (1949), on the death of his teenage son, Johnny Gunther, from a brain tumor.

== Life ==
Gunther was born in 1901 in the Lakeview district of Chicago and grew up on the North Side of the city. He was the first child of a German-American family: his father was Eugene Guenther, a traveling salesman; his mother Lizette Schoeninger Guenther.

During World War I, the family changed the spelling of its name from Guenther to Gunther to avoid having an obviously-German name.

In 1922, he was awarded a Bachelor of Philosophy from the University of Chicago, where he was literary editor of the student paper.

He worked briefly in the city as a reporter for the Chicago Daily News, but he soon moved to Europe to be a correspondent with the Daily News London bureau, where he covered Europe, the Balkans, and the Middle East.

Gunther met Frances Fineman in London in 1925 and the two were married in 1927. Until 1936, they worked together (Frances as a foreign correspondent for London's News Chronicle) throughout Europe. Gunther wrote, "I was at one time or another in charge of Daily News offices in London, Berlin, Vienna, Moscow, Rome, and Paris, and I also visited Poland, Spain, the Balkans, and Scandinavia. I have worked in every European country except Portugal. I saw at first hand the whole extraordinary panorama of Europe from 1924 to 1936." In Vienna, Gunther worked alongside a group of English-speaking central European correspondents that included Marcel Fodor, Dorothy Thompson, Robert Best, and George Eric Rowe Gedye.

Gunther later described those years as

the bubbling, blazing days of American foreign correspondence in Europe. ... Most of us traveled steadily, met constantly, exchanged information, caroused, took in each other's washing, and, even when most fiercely competitive, were devoted friends. ... We were scavengers, buzzards, out to get the news, no matter whose wings got clipped.

According to Michael Bloch, Gunther enjoyed a same-sex relationship in the 1930s in Vienna with the future Leader of the British Labour Party, Hugh Gaitskell.

Gunther's experiences as a journalist in interwar Vienna formed the basis for his novel The Lost City.

His research and the contacts that Gunther developed as a reporter also led directly to the first of the Inside books, Inside Europe, which was intended by Gunther to summarize the European political situation for the general reader. With the success of the Inside books starting in the late 1930s, Gunther resigned his position to devote his full-time to the books. During World War II, he worked as a war correspondent in Europe.

The Gunthers had two children: Judy, who died in 1929 before the age of 1, and John Jr. (Johnny), who was born in 1929 and died in 1947 of a brain tumor. The Gunthers divorced in 1944.

Gunther married Jane Perry Vandercook in 1948; the two adopted a son. Jane P. Gunther, a devoted student of the arts who accompanied her husband on his voyages and contributed to his books, was born in August 1916. She died in New York City, on May 22, 2020, at the age of 103. She had been widowed for a week shy of half a century.

Gunther died of liver cancer in 1970.

== Writings ==
=== Inside series ===
The books that made Gunther famous in his time were the "Inside" series of continental surveys. For each book, Gunther traveled extensively through the area the book covered, interviewed political, social, and business leaders; talked with average people; reviewed area statistics; and then wrote a lengthy overview of what he had learned and how he interpreted it.

About Inside Europe (published in 1936), Gunther wrote, "This book has had a striking success all over the world. I was fortunate in that it appeared at just the right time, when the three totalitarian dictators took the stage and people began to be vitally interested in them."

In 1947, Gunther tackled Inside U.S.A., visiting all 48 states. On the 50th anniversary of the book's publication, Arthur Schlesinger Jr., appraised the book and its impact:

This book, now half a century old, is an astonishing tour de force. It presents a shrewd, fast-moving, sparkling panorama of the United States at this historic moment of apparent triumph. Sinclair Lewis called it "the richest treasure-house of facts about America that has ever been published, and probably the most spirited and interesting." At the same time, in its preoccupations and insights Inside U.S.A. foresaw dilemmas and paradoxes that were to harass and frustrate Americans for the rest of the century.

The Inside series grew to include volumes covering all populated continents: Inside Europe, Inside U.S.A., Inside Asia, Inside Latin America, Inside Africa, Inside Russia Today, and, finally, Inside Australia and New Zealand (with W. H. Forbis). Several of the volumes were issued multiple times in updated and revised editions over the years, as world events demanded. Inside Africa proved particularly well-timed as a historical record. During 1952–53 Gunther and his wife visited nearly all forty-four African political entities then in existence during what was to prove the final stage of mainly colonial rule.

=== Other nonfiction and fiction works ===
In addition to the "Inside" series and related volumes, Gunther wrote eight novels and three biographies. The most notable of them are Bright Nemesis, The Troubled Midnight, Roosevelt in Retrospect (published in 1950) and Eisenhower, a biography of the famous general released in 1952, the year that Dwight Eisenhower was elected President. In addition, Gunther published several books for young readers, including a biography of Alexander the Great in 1953, and Meet Soviet Russia, a two-volume adaptation of Inside Russia Today in 1962.

=== Death Be Not Proud ===
The book for which Gunther is best remembered today, however, does not deal with politics. Death Be Not Proud is the story of his son, Johnny, who died of a brain tumor at the age of 17. In the book, "a restrained and moving work intended for family and friends," the elder Gunther details the struggles that he and his ex-wife, Frances Fineman, had gone through in attempting to save their son's life, the many treatments pursued (everything from radical surgery to strictly controlled diet), the ups and downs of apparent remission and eventual relapse, and the strain that it placed on all three of them. Gunther portrays his son as a remarkable young man, who had corresponded intelligently with Albert Einstein about physics. The book became a bestseller, and in 1975, it was made into an Emmy-nominated television movie, starring Arthur Hill as John Gunther, Jane Alexander as his wife, and Robby Benson as Johnny. It remains a staple of many high-school curricula.

== Other media ==
=== Broadway: Inside U.S.A. ===
Inside U.S.A. was made into a Broadway revue, also titled Inside U.S.A., in 1948, with songs by Howard Dietz and Arthur Schwartz. The production starred, among others, Beatrice Lillie and Jack Haley and played for 399 performances.

=== Television – High Road ===
From September 7, 1959, until September 17, 1960, Gunther was host and narrator of a television program on the ABC network entitled John Gunther's High Road. It originally aired Monday nights at 8:30, but soon switched to Saturday night at 8 p.m., immediately following the Dick Clark variety show. The High Road program consisted of travelogues of various nations around the world. Some of the films were produced especially for this program and others were obtained from other sources. The common thread of all episodes was Gunther's narration, although he had little or nothing to do with the actual content.

== List of works ==
=== Nonfiction ===
- (1932) Not To Be Repeated: Merry-Go-Round of Europe by Anonymous
- (1934) Habsburgs Again?
- (1936) Inside Europe
- (1938 ed) Inside Europe (includes minor updates)
- (1939 ed) Inside Europe (includes minor updates)
- (1939) The High Cost of Hitler
- (1939) Inside Asia
- (1940 ed) Inside Europe (includes major additions and changes due to the geopolitical impacts of Hitler and Nazi Germany)
- (1941) Inside Latin America
- (1944) D-Day
- (1947) Inside U.S.A.
- (1949) Death Be Not Proud, memoir
- (1949) Behind the Curtain (published in the UK as Behind Europe's Curtain)
- (1950) Roosevelt in Retrospect: A Profile in History, biography
- (1951) The Riddle of MacArthur: Japan, Korea, and the Far East
- (1952) Eisenhower, the Man and the Symbol, biography
- (1953) Alexander the Great, biography
- (1955) Inside Africa
- (1956) Days to Remember: America 1945-1955 (with Bernard Quint)
- (1958) Inside Russia Today
- (1959) Julius Caesar
- (1960) Taken at the Flood: The Story of Albert D. Lasker, biography
- (1961) Inside Europe Today
- (1961) A Fragment of Autobiography: The Fun of Writing the Inside Books
- (1962) Meet Soviet Russia (2 volumes)
- (1965) Procession
- (1967) Inside South America
- (1969) Twelve Cities
- (1972) John Gunther's Inside Australia and New Zealand (with W. H. Forbis) ISBN 0-241-02180-4

=== Novels ===
- (1926) The Red Pavilion
- (1927) Peter Lancelot: An Amusement (published in the U.S. as Eden for One: An Amusement)
- (1929) The Golden Fleece
- (1932) Bright Nemesis
- (1945) The Troubled Midnight
- (1964) The Lost City
- (1970) The Indian Sign (published in the UK as Quatrain)
