= Eduard von Rindfleisch =

German pathologist (1836–1908)

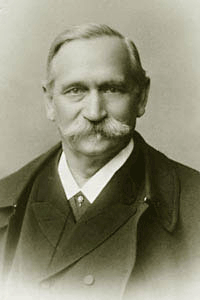
- Von Rindfleisch, c. 1890
- Born: December 15, 1836; Köthen, Principality of Anhalt-Köthen (now Germany)
- Died: 6 December 1908; Würzburg, German Empire
- Occupation(s): Pathologist, histologist

Georg Eduard von Rindfleisch (15 December 1836 – 6 December 1908) was a German pathologist and histologist. He was born in Köthen and died in Würzburg.

== Academic career ==
He studied medicine in Würzburg, Berlin and Heidelberg, earning his doctorate in 1859. After obtaining his degree, he served as an assistant to Rudolf Virchow in Berlin, then in 1862 received his habilitation at the University of Breslau. In 1864 he became an associate professor of pathology at the University of Zurich, and during the following year, attained a full professorship at Bonn. In 1874 he acquired the chair of pathology at the University of Würzburg.

He was one of the first proposers of a vascular theory for multiple sclerosis after noticing in 1863 that the inflammation-associated lesions were distributed around veins. This work was the ground layer for the later Tracy Putnam work in the vascular theory of MS.

Also, he made noteworthy contributions in his pioneer research of tuberculosis. He was one of the leading advocates of scientific "neo-vitalism".

== Associated eponyms ==
- "Rindfleisch's folds": Semilunar folds of the serous surface of the pericardium around the beginning of the aorta. Also known as the ascending aortic fold.
- "Rindfleisch's cells": Historical name for eosinophilic leukocytes.

== Selected writings ==
- Lehrbuch der patologischen Gewebelehre. Engelmann, Leipzig 1867. (Textbook of pathologic histology).
- Die Elemente der Pathologie: ein natürlicher Grundriss der wissenschaftlichen Medicin. Engelmann, Leipzig 1883. (Elements of pathology: an outline of natural scientific medicine).
- Ärztliche Philosophie: Festrede zur Feier des 306. Stiftungstages der Königlichen Julius-Maximilians-Universität. Hertz, Würzburg 1888.
