= Death Be Not Proud (book) =

1949 memoir by John Gunther

- First edition (published by Harper & Brothers]
- Author: John Gunther
- Language: English
- Publisher: Harper & Brothers
- Publication date: 1949

Death Be Not Proud is a 1949 memoir by American journalist John Gunther. The book describes the decline and death of Gunther's son, Johnny, due to a brain tumor. The title comes from Holy Sonnet X by John Donne, also known from its first line as the poem "Death Be Not Proud".

At the time the book was published in the late 1940s, memoirs about illness and grief were uncommon.

== Synopsis ==
The book is an account of Johnny Gunther's experience with a brain tumor, and ends with his death at age 17.

The book consists of two parts. Part 1 contains the primary narrative of the book, while Part 2 contains additional letters written by Johnny, excerpts from his diary, and a short essay by his mother, Frances Gunther.

The primary narrative consists of five chapters, and an Aftermath section.

Chapter 1 begins with Johnny's diagnosis with a brain tumor in the spring of 1946. It describes the first operation that Johnny underwent, at the Neurological Institute of New York. The surgery confirmed the existence of the tumor. One of his doctors, Tracy Putnam, said, "It was about the size of an orange. I got half of it." Johnny recovered from the surgery, while the nature of the tumor was assessed: it was described as an "astroblastoma undergoing transformation".

Chapter 2 begins in June 1946 when Johnny underwent daily X-ray treatment of his tumor until June 20. Johnny's vision was impaired to varying degrees because of papilledema (pressure on the nerves to the eyes) caused by the tumor. Johnny's parents, John and Frances, sought help from many sources. Between August 1 and 5, 1946, Johnny was treated with chlormethine, described by the author as mustard. Dr. Max Gerson was consulted, and Johnny began a special, highly regimented program of diet and enemas on September 7, 1946, visiting Dr. Gerson's nursing home for the first time.

Chapter 3 describes Johnny's initial ill state, and then seeming recovery, within a week of beginning the Gerson diet. His papilledema diminished, and his blood counts improved. Johnny began to be tutored in this period in an attempt to make up for lost classwork, with the hope of graduating with his class at Deerfield Academy the following spring. In December 1946, Johnny's condition worsened, leading to a second operation. Dr. Lester Mount reporting that "he had successfully drained an abscess that went five centimeters into the brain beyond the table of the skull, and had got out a full cup of pus and fluid." Johnny was discharged from the hospital on January 12, 1947, and his parents were hopeful at this time.

Chapter 4 begins with Johnny's apparent recovery, and then, starting in late February, his decline. He began having episodes of amnesia and shivering. Through March and April, he continued studying in an effort to graduate and be admitted to Harvard University for the fall. The bump on Johnny's skull, caused by the tumor, began growing, and Dr. Mount attempted to drain it of fluid. However, the bump was "like stone again, and Mount had scarcely been able to drain a drop."

On May 1, 1947, Johnny underwent another major operation. Dr. Mount reported that "the mass was even invading his scalp and that, despite the depth he had reached, 11 cm., he had never penetrated to the healthy brain tissue at all."

Chapter 5 describes Johnny's graduation from high school and his death, on June 30, 1947.

The Aftermath section describes Johnny's funeral and the reaction of people to Johnny's death.

== Publication ==
Gunther wrote the book in the months after his son's death, originally with the idea of printing some copies to distribute privately, as some parents had done in remembrance of soldiers who were killed in action. After writing it, however, he changed his mind and sought to have it published. Although Gunther was an experienced and extremely popular author, his publisher, Harper & Brothers, was reluctant to take on this book. They were concerned that it was too private a subject for the general public. To forestall criticism for profiting off of his death, both the author and the publisher agreed to donate all profits to children's cancer research.

== Reception ==
Soon after the book's release, Dorothy Thompson wrote

But had [Johnny] lived to be 90 and had his achievements filled encyclopedias, he could have made no greater achievement than this, transmitted by his father: To show us what, on its highest levels of courage, serenity, truth and beauty, a human life can be; to show us that as we live we die, and life and death are one.

Katharine Graham, writing for the Washington Post, wrote "Without doubt, the outstanding work of the week is John Gunther's Death Be Not Proud, in the Ladies Home Journal. But it is only for the strong-minded or the very strong-hearted...Harper's is publishing the book, of which this is a condensed version."

A reviewer in the Washington Post wrote that "It is this memory [of Johnny] which John Gunther has attempted to preserve in a memoir heart-breaking in its quiet simplicity and restraint."

Vogue magazine described Death Be Not Proud as "a poignant, factual account of [Gunther's] son's death."

Albin Krebs, in his obituary for John Gunther, wrote

The vignette, “Death Be Not Proud,” the profits from which went to children's cancer research, was probably Mr. Gunther's most vividly memorable work.

"To read it is to grasp the meaning of man's power to defy Death's hurt, to be filled with confidence and emptied of despair. It will bring fresh spirit to the weary, new confidence and light to those who walk in shadow." — Walter Duranthy, in the New York Herald Tribune.

== Adaptations ==
The story was made into a television movie in 1975, starring Robby Benson as Johnny Gunther, and Arthur Hill as his father.

== Publication data ==
- John Gunther, Death Be Not Proud (1949). Harper Perennial edition 1998: ISBN 0-06-092989-8
