= Paolo Zamboni =

Italian doctor and scientist

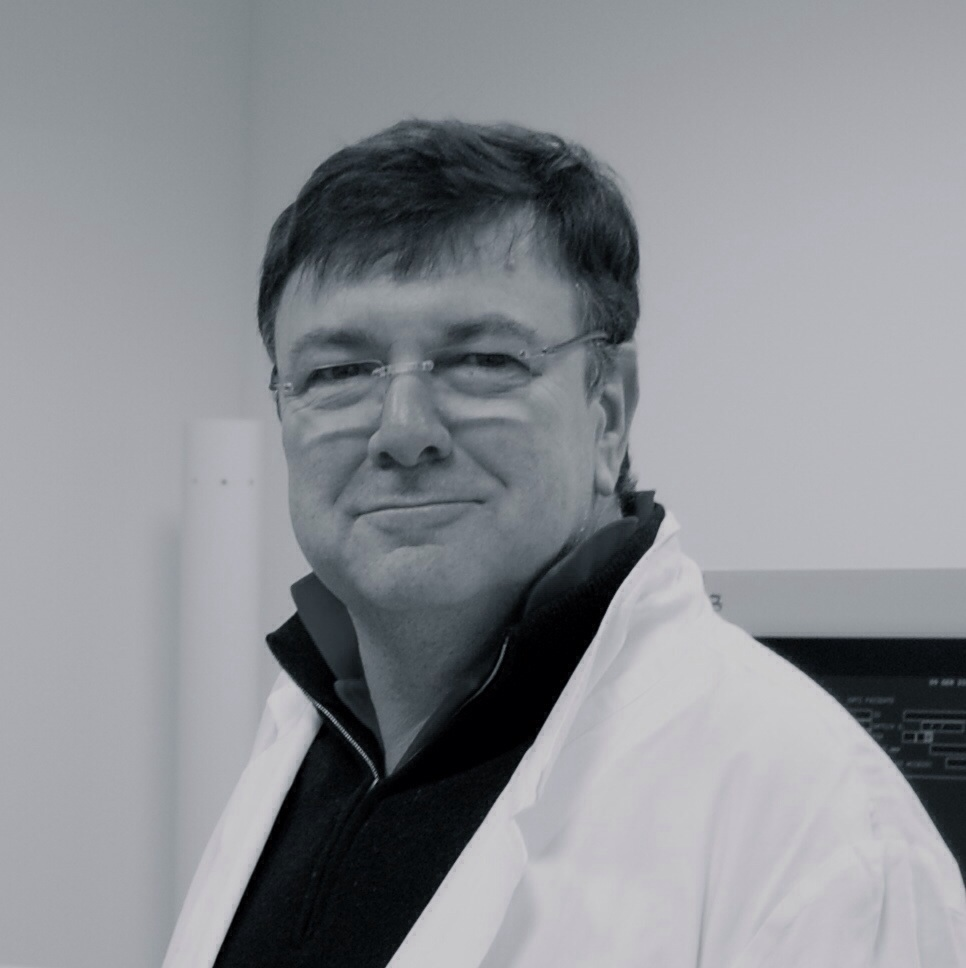
- Paolo Zamboni
- Born: 25 March 1957; Ferrara, Italy
- Citizenship: Italy
- Awards: ISNVD Gold Medal
- Scientific career
- Fields: Vascular Diseases
- Workplaces: Ferrara, Italy

Paolo Zamboni (born 25 March 1957, Ferrara, Italy) is an Italian doctor and scientist. He is full Professor and Director of the School of Vascular Surgery at the University of Ferrara in Italy.

He is known for his description and proposed cure of the vascular disease chronic cerebrospinal venous insufficiency (CCSVI) strongly related with multiple sclerosis and other neurodegenerative diseases such as Ménière and Parkinson's, but the existence of this disease is very controversial, with significantly more detractors than supporters, and there is no good evidence that the surgery helps MS patients.

== Biography ==
Graduated with honors in Medicine and Surgery in 1982, Zamboni specialized in General Surgery in 1987 and in Vascular Surgery 1992. In 1992 he obtained the fellowship at the Department of Vascular Surgery of the University of California in San Francisco. From 1993 to 2000 he was visiting professor at the Department of Surgery of the Uniformed Services University of the Health Sciences of Bethesda, Maryland and from 2008 to 2012 at the Jacobs Institute of Neurology in Buffalo, New York, and at the Neuroscience Department of Harvard University (2010) and Chicago University (2012).

Since 2004 he is director of the Vascular Disease Center of Ferrara University. In 2008 he announced the discovery of a new venous pathology, called chronic cerebrospinal venous insufficiency (CCSVI) and postulates a controversial correlation between this pathology and multiple sclerosis

During 2010-2011 he was the president of the International Society for Neurovascular Diseases (ISNVD).

== Chronic Cerebrospinal Venous Insufficiency – CCSVI ==
In 2008 Zamboni described Chronic cerebrospinal venous insufficiency (CCSVI or CCVI), the compromised flow of blood in the veins draining the central nervous system. He hypothesized that it might play a role in the cause or development of multiple sclerosis (MS) and devised a surgical procedure which the media nicknamed a liberation procedure or liberation therapy, involving venoplasty or stenting of certain veins. Zamboni's ideas about CCSVI are very controversial, with significantly more detractors than supporters, and any treatments based on his ideas are considered experimental.

There is no scientific evidence that CCSVI is related to MS, and there is no good evidence that the surgery helps MS patients. Zamboni's first published research was neither blinded nor did it have a comparison group. Zamboni also did not disclose his financial ties to Esaote, the manufacturer of the ultrasound specifically used in CCSVI diagnosis. The "liberation procedure" has been criticized for possibly resulting in serious complications and deaths, while its purported benefits have not been proven. In 2012, the United States Food and Drug Administration states that it is not clear if CCSVI exists as a clinical entity and that these treatments may cause more harm. In 2017 they emphasized that this use of balloon angioplasty is not an approved use. In a 2017 study Zamboni et al. stated "Venous PTA cannot be recommended for patients with relapsing-remitting multiple sclerosis." In 2018 a study in Neurology concluded "Our data do not support the continued use of venoplasty of extracranial jugular and/or azygous venous narrowing to improve patient-reported outcomes, chronic MS symptoms, or the disease course of MS."

Research on CCSVI was fast-tracked, but researchers have been unable to find a connection between CCSVI and MS. This has raised serious objections to the hypothesis of CCSVI originating multiple sclerosis. Additional research investigating the CCSVI hypothesis is underway. A 2013 study found that CCSVI is equally rare in people with and without MS, while narrowing of the cervical veins is equally common.

== Research on Chronic Venous Insufficiency - CVI ==
Zamboni has conducted research on lower extremity Chronic venous insufficiency, testing a minimally invasive and conservative treatment of the saphenous vein: the CHIVA method. On this topic he conducted several randomized clinical trials and published books.

The CHIVA and the stripping methods are equivalent regarding recurrence of varicose veins, but the CHIVA method may slightly reduce nerve injury and hematoma. The CHIVA method is also equivalent to either radio frequency ablation or endovenous laser therapy regarding recurrence and side effects.

Cell therapies for the treatment of severe vascular ulcerations of the lower limbs are another Zamboni field of study. Randomized studies with autologous stem-cell derived from adipose tissue were conducted by his team.

== Research on physiology of cerebral venous drainage ==
The cerebral venous return was investigated by Professor Zamboni also in the Space, as PI of the study Drain Brain of the International Space Station, promoted by NASA, ESA and ASI. A novel post processing analysis of jugular vein ultrasound and strain gauge plethysmography allowed to monitor the astronaut cerebral venous drainage in microgravity condition. Space trials involved the Italian astronaut Samantha Cristoforetti.

Zamboni also described other anomalies of cerebral venous return which generates neurological symptoms, as well as models in physiology of brain drainage

== Diagnosis on painting ==
Initially started as a hobby, identify disease processes in paintings and canvas is lately one of the Professor Zamboni' research fields. Diagnosis ranges from the Raphael's Michelangelo, Rembrandt's Bathsheba at Her Bath and Caravaggio's Bacchus. In "The medical enigma of Rembrandt's Bathsheba", Zamboni solves the mystery of the controversial detail of the woman's left breast, furrowed by an irregular, slightly swollen mark of a color between bluish and brownish. The model for the Bathsheba, admired by millions of visitors to the Louvre, was suffering from thrombophlebitis of a superficial vein of the breast, a condition described by Mondor in 1939," states the professor. So not mastitis or carcinoma, as believed for centuries. According to Zamboni, the varicose veins on the legs and knees are evident in Michelangelo, in the role of Heraclitus, frescoed by Raphael in The School of Athens. The evident anemia, brown skin, and acanthosis nigricans of Young Sick Bacchus of Caravaggio exhibited at the Galleria Borghese in Rome, according to Zamboni suggest the diagnosis of Addison's disease, a condition described in the 1800s affecting the adrenal glands.

== Works ==
- Alessia Giaquinta; Byung-Boong Lee; Carlo Setacci; Pierfrancesco Veroux; Paolo Zamboni (2018). Latest Frontiers of Hemodynamics, Imaging and Treatment of Obstructive Venous Disease. Minerva Medica. ISBN 978-88-7711-929-2.
- Paolo Zamboni; Erika Mendoza; Sergio Gianesini (2018). Saphenous Vein-Sparing Strategies in Chronic Venous Disease. Cham, Switzerland: Springer. ISBN 978-3-319-70638-2.
- Paolo Zamboni; Claude Franceschi (2009). Principles of Venous Hemodynamics. Nova Science Publishers. ISBN 978-1-60692-485-3.

== Awards and recognition ==
Zamboni was appointed "Commander" of the Order of Merit of the Italian Republic in 2017.

He is listed on topitalianscientists.org.
