= Chronic cerebrospinal venous insufficiency controversy =

Chronic cerebrospinal venous insufficiency
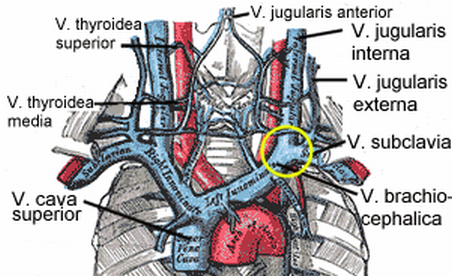
- Veins of the neck. V.jugularis interna is proposed to be stenosed or have a malformed valve in CCSVI cases.
- Specialty: Cardiology

Chronic cerebrospinal venous insufficiency (CCSVI or CCVI) is a term invented by Italian researcher Paolo Zamboni in 2008 to describe compromised flow of blood in the veins draining the central nervous system. Zamboni hypothesized that it might play a role in the cause or development of multiple sclerosis (MS). Zamboni also devised a surgical procedure which the media nicknamed a liberation procedure or liberation therapy, involving venoplasty or stenting of certain veins. Zamboni's ideas about CCSVI are very controversial, with significantly more detractors than supporters, and any treatments based on his ideas are considered experimental.

There is no scientific evidence that CCSVI is related to MS, and there is no good evidence that the surgery helps MS patients. Zamboni's first published research was neither blinded nor did it have a comparison group. Zamboni also did not disclose his financial ties to Esaote, the manufacturer of the ultrasound specifically used in CCSVI diagnosis. The "liberation procedure" has been criticized for possibly resulting in serious complications and deaths, while its purported benefits have not been proven. In 2012, the United States Food and Drug Administration states that it is not clear if CCSVI exists as a clinical entity and that these treatments may cause more harm. In 2017 they emphasized that this use of balloon angioplasty is not an approved use. In a 2017 study Zamboni et al. stated "Venous PTA cannot be recommended for patients with relapsing-remitting multiple sclerosis." In 2018 a study in Neurology concluded "Our data do not support the continued use of venoplasty of extracranial jugular and/or azygous venous narrowing to improve patient-reported outcomes, chronic MS symptoms, or the disease course of MS."

Research on CCSVI was fast-tracked, but researchers have been unable to find a connection between CCSVI and MS. This has raised serious objections to the hypothesis of CCSVI originating multiple sclerosis. Additional research investigating the CCSVI hypothesis is underway. A 2013 study found that CCSVI is equally rare in people with and without MS, while narrowing of the cervical veins is equally common.

== Hypothesis ==
Proposed consequences of CCSVI syndrome include intracranial hypoxia, delayed perfusion, reduced drainage of catabolites, increased transpulmonary pressure, and iron deposits around the cerebral veins. Multiple sclerosis has been proposed as a possible outcome of CCSVI.

== Pathophysiology ==
Zamboni and colleagues claimed that in MS patients diagnosed with CCSVI, the azygos and IJV veins are stenotic (abnormally narrowed) in around 90% of cases. Zamboni theorized that malformed blood vessels cause increased deposition of iron in the brain, which in turn triggers autoimmunity and degeneration of the nerve's myelin sheath. While the initial article on CCSVI claimed that abnormal venous function parameters were not seen in healthy people, others have noted that this is not the case. In the report by Zamboni none of the healthy participants met criteria for a diagnosis of CCSVI while all patients did. Such outstanding results have raised suspicions of a possible spectrum bias, which originates on a diagnostic test not being used under clinically significant conditions.

Further studies of the relationship between CCSVI and MS have had variable results, with many failing to reproduce the association between MS and CCSVI. Moreover, the greatest predictor of positive results is researchers' involvement in the administration of the "liberation procedure". This effect goes to the extent that, when only fully independent studies are considered, no association at all is found. The poor reproducibility across studies and diagnostic modalities has led some authors to conclude that CCVSI might be nothing more than a clinically irrelevant sonographic construct.

Already by 2010, there were "a growing number of papers that raise serious questions about its (CCSVI) validity", although evidence had been "both for and against the controversial hypothesis". It was agreed that it was urgent to perform appropriate epidemiological studies to define the possible relationship between CCSVI and MS, although existing data did not support CCSVI as the cause of MS.

=== Venous malformations ===
Most of the venous problems in MS patients have been reported to be truncular venous malformations, including azygous stenosis, defective jugular valves and jugular vein aneurysms. Problems with the innominate vein and superior vena cava have also been reported to contribute to CCSVI. A vascular component in MS had been cited previously.

Several characteristics of venous diseases make it difficult to include MS in this group. In its current form, CCSVI cannot explain some of the epidemiological findings in MS. These include risk factors such as Epstein-Barr infection, parental ancestry, date of birth and geographic location. MS is also more common in women, while venous diseases are more common in men. Venous pathology is commonly associated with hypertension, infarcts, edema and transient ischemia, and occurs more often with age, however these conditions are hardly ever seen in MS and the disease seldom appears after age 50. Finally, an organ-specific immune response is not seen in any other kind of venous disease.

=== Iron deposits ===
Iron deposition as a cause of MS received support when a relationship between venous pressure and iron depositions in MS patients was found in a neuroimaging study, and criticism as other researchers found normal ferritin levels in the cerebrospinal fluid of MS patients. Additionally iron deposition occurs in different neurological diseases such as Alzheimer's disease or Parkinson's disease that are not associated with CCSVI. Evidence linking CCSVI and iron deposition is lacking, and dysregulation of iron metabolism in MS is more complex than simply iron accumulation in the brain tissue.

=== Genetics ===
A small genetic study looked at fifteen MS patients who also had CCSVI. It found 234 specific copy number variations in the human leukocyte antigen focus. Of these, GRB2, HSPA1L and HSPA1A were found to be specifically connected to both MS and angiogenesis, TAF11 was connected to both MS and artery passage, and HLA-DQA2 was suggestive of having an implication for angiogenesis as it interacts with CD4. A study in 268 MS patients and 155 controls reported more a frequency of CCSVI in the MS group that was more than twice as high as in the controls group and was also higher in the progressive MS group than in the non-progressive MS group. This study found no relationship between CCSVI and HLA DRB1*1501, a genetic variation that has been consistently linked to MS.

== Diagnosis ==
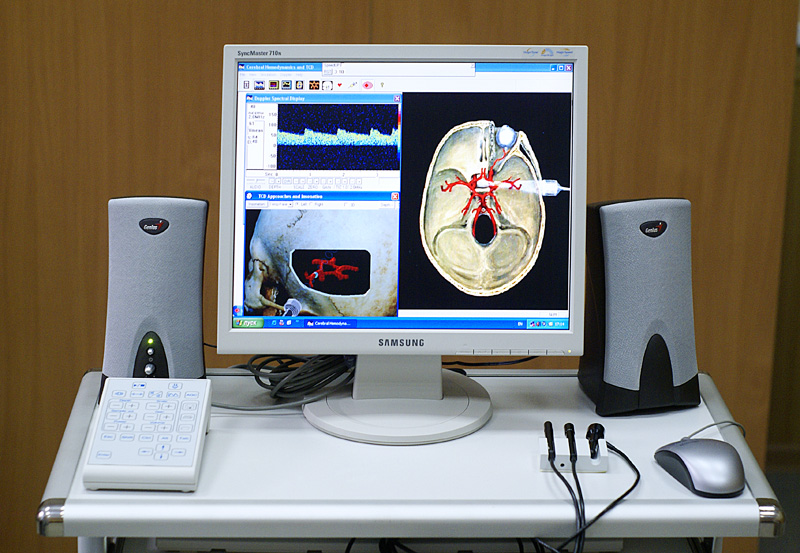
Computer-enhanced transcranial doppler.

CCSVI was first described using specialized extracranial and transcranial doppler sonography. Five ultrasound criteria of venous drainage have been proposed to be characteristic of the syndrome, although two are considered sufficient for diagnosis of CCSVI:

- reflux in the internal jugular and vertebral veins,
- reflux in the deep cerebral veins,
- high-resolution B-mode ultrasound evidence of stenosis of the internal jugular vein,
- absence of flow in the internal jugular or vertebral veins on Doppler ultrasound, and
- reverted postural control of the main cerebral venous outflow pathways.

It is still not clear whether magnetic resonance venography, venous angiography, or Doppler sonography should be considered the gold standard for the diagnosis of CCSVI. Use of magnetic resonance venography for the diagnosis of CCSVI in MS patients has been proposed by some to have limited value, and should be used only in combination with other techniques. Others have stated that magnetic resonance venography is a valid measure which has advantages over Doppler including the fact that results are more operator-independent.

Diagnostic criteria have been criticized. Both the number of criteria and the need of being positive for two of them as enough for diagnosis are arbitrary ideas. Moreover, experienced groups in the use of ultrasound have not been able to show intracranial or extracranial reflux in MS patients or even healthy controls whereas the criterion of absence of flow and the criterion regarding stenosis are considered not valid since they are related to normal physiological processes and not pathology. These problems in the criteria have led some researchers to consider the criteria inadequate and more generally the concept of CCSVI flawed.

== Treatment ==
=== All proposed treatments are experimental ===
Treatment based on the idea of CCSVI is considered experimental.

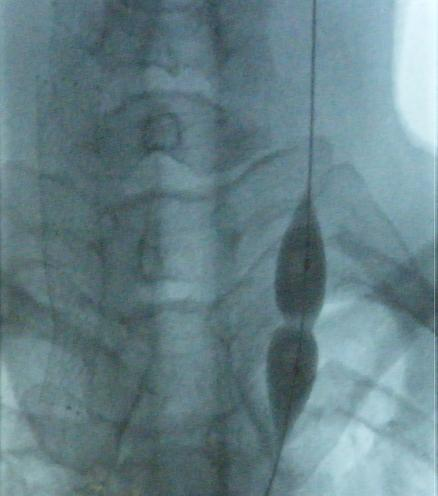
Balloon dilatation of stenosed jugular vein in a MS patient. Stenosis prevents the balloon from inflating (in the middle) while pressure is low.

Further trials are required to determine if the benefits, if any, of the procedure outweigh its risks. Most experts, and medical and patients organizations, including the National Multiple Sclerosis Society of the USA or the Cardiovascular and Interventional Radiological Society of Europe (CIRSE), recommend not using the proposed treatment outside clinical trials until its effectiveness is confirmed by controlled studies. Moreover, the CIRSE has stated that treatment research should begin by a small, placebo-controlled, prospective randomised trial which should be monitored by an independent organization. An exception has been the Society of Interventional Radiology in the US and Canada, which considered research on the effectiveness of CCSVI intervention to be inconclusive as of 2010. In March 2013 a press release indicated that the first prospective, placebo-controlled study of balloon angioplasty for MS had not shown any benefit of the therapy. The study, a phase II clinical trial designed to evaluate safety and efficacy of endovascular treatment, enrolled initially 10 patients that received the treatment and 20 more afterwards that were either allocated to receive angioplasty or a placebo intervention.

Kuwait became the first country in the world where treatment of CCSVI, as of 2010, was explicitly allowed by the medical authorities and paid by the state health system. As of 2010, the procedure was performed privately in 40 countries, and, despite existing recommendations, as of 2013 it is believed that over 30,000 patients have undergone the procedure.

=== Procedures ===
Balloon angioplasty and stenting have been proposed as treatment options for CCSVI in MS. The proposed treatment has been termed "liberation therapy" though the name has been criticized for suggesting unrealistic results.

Balloon angioplasty in a preliminary, uncontrolled, unblinded study by Zamboni improved symptoms in MS in a minority of treated people. Although the procedure pushes the vein open temporarily, the effect does not persist, supporters advise against using stents.

Venous percutaneous transluminal angioplasty (PTA) has proven to be safe but due to its ineffectiveness is not recommended.

=== Adverse effects ===
While the procedure has been reported to be generally safe for MS patients, severe complications related to the angioplasty and stenting that have been reported include intracranial hemorrhage, stent migration into a renal vein, thrombosis and nerve compression syndrome of cranial nerves XI and XII. One death case appeared in the scientific literature, while 3 other deaths have been related to CCSVI treatment in the media. Some United States hospitals have banned the surgical procedure outside clinical trials due to safety concerns until more evidence to support its use is available.

In May 2012 the U.S. Food and Drug Administration issued a safety communication on CCSVI, stating that MS patients undergoing angioplasty and/or stenting to treat CCSVI risk serious injuries or death. Furthermore, it also noted that the benefits of these experimental procedures have not been proven and that studies exploring a link between MS and CCSVI are inconclusive.

== History ==
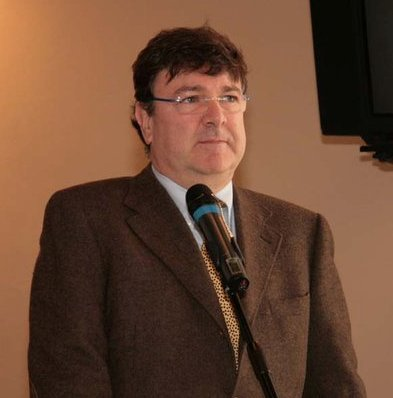
Paolo Zamboni described CCSVI in 2008.

Venous pathology has been associated with MS for more than a century. Pathologist Georg Eduard Rindfleisch noted in 1863 that the inflammation-associated lesions were distributed around veins. Later, in 1935, Tracy Putnam was able to produce similar lesions in dogs blocking their veins

The term "chronic cerebrospinal venous insufficiency" was coined in 2008 by Paolo Zamboni, who described it in patients with multiple sclerosis. According to Zamboni, CCSVI had a high sensitivity and specificity differentiating healthy individuals from those with multiple sclerosis. Zamboni's results were criticized because his study was not blinded and his results needed to be verified by further studies. Zamboni had become interested in CCSVI in 1999 when his wife was diagnosed with MS.

== Society and culture ==
=== Conflict of interest ===
Paolo Zamboni has patents related to the highly sensitive ultrasound diagnostic systems manufactured by Esaote which, he proposes, should be used to diagnose CCSVI. Moreover, Zamboni's research center has also received support in the form of equipment and technical assistance from this manufacturer. These are potential conflicts of interest that he has never disclosed when publishing scientific articles, which would be against ethical practices of some countries such as the United States.

=== Media ===
CCSVI has received much attention in media, scientific literature, and on the Internet. This has been considered an example of how online communication and social media are modifying the general public's relationships with science, politics, and medicine. Social media has played a key role in increasing awareness of the theory for the general public and politicians.

Media coverage has been perceived by some as "hype", with exaggerated claims that have led to excessive expectations. This has been partially attributed to some of the investigators of the theory. Mainstream media initial approximations to Zamboni's theory were enthusiastic and emphasized Zamboni's effort to find a cure for his wife, along with the improvement of some patients after its alleged treatment. Initial difficulty reproducing results connecting MS and CCSVI, combined with reports of secondary effects of the surgical procedure, led to a more cautious discourse proposing that more investigation in the relationship between CCSVI and MS was needed. The first fatality related to CCSVI treatment was a pivotal development in this trend towards a less optimistic media view of the theory.

The Internet has been extensively used by patient groups to obtain and disseminate information on CCSVI. People with MS often read extensively about the CCSVI theory and its development on Internet sites, and a search for "liberation procedure" in Google as of August 2010 yielded more than 2.5 million hits. The Internet has also been used to advertise places where stenting for CCSVI is performed, and to more generally disseminate all the information on CCSVI. Social media have served patient groups in their attempt to pressure official bodies to make decisions favoring funding of clinical trials, or the public coverage of stenting and venoplasty as treatments of MS. Likewise, social media have been accused of creating a division between CCSVI supporters and those who say it does not work. Indeed, they have been repeatedly used by advocates of the CCSVI theory to attack those who were more critical or cautious, most commonly with accusations of being tainted due to commercial relationships with pharmaceutical companies.

Many patients who have had the surgical procedure report their improvements on social media websites such as structured patient databases and YouTube. Such stories are only anecdotal evidence of efficacy, and do not constitute a scientific proof of the efficacy of the treatment since, for example, those who have had a positive result are more prone to post their cases than those who had little or no improvement, and the reported improvements in patients' condition can be attributed to the placebo effect. Patients' reasons for not publishing negative results may include embarrassment about the money spent in the procedure without effect and the negative reaction they expect from other people with MS. Caution has been recommended regarding patients' self-reports found on the web.

Scientists and physicians transmitted their arguments regarding CCSVI inadequately, especially after the initial rising of the hypothesis. Their communication was characterized by an excessive hesitation and a lack of clear statements, as opposed to CCSVI proponents, who "won the communication battle, at least in the early rounds." A positive effect of the important media coverage may be that it forces the world of medical research to be self-critical and give appropriate responses to the questions that globalization of the theory raises, especially among people with MS.

=== Reception in Canada ===
While reasons are not completely clear, the CCSVI theory was received differently in Canada than other places. The public interest and number of media appearances were much greater than elsewhere, including Italy, and debate has been heated regarding funding. As an example, by the end of 2009, a public petition to the country health authorities in support of the "liberation treatment" had received over 17,000 signatures. The debate regarding funding in Canada has been considered to be specially informative as an example of extreme involvement of politics, due to public pressure, in decisions usually governed by scientific evidence.

In 2009, the Multiple Sclerosis Society of Canada committed to funding research on the connection between CCSVI and MS, although later in 2010 it came under criticism for opposing clinical trials of CCSVI therapy. The MS Society of Canada in September 2010 reserved one million dollars toward CCSVI research "when a therapeutic trial is warranted and approved."

At a political level there have been contradictory positions, with some provinces funding trials, others stating that since therapy is unproven they should wait, and others urging for a pan-Canadian trial. British Columbia, Alberta, and Newfoundland and Labrador funded observational studies in which patients who had already received the treatment were included. Over 2 million dollars were allocated to these studies. The province of Saskatchewan was more aggressive and provided 2.2 million dollars for some of its residents to be included in a clinical trial.

The Canadian Institutes of Health Research (CIHR), the federal agency responsible for funding health research, recommended in 2010 against funding a pan-Canadian trial of liberation therapy because there was a lack of evidence on the safety or efficacy of the procedure. It suggested a scientific expert working group made up of the principal investigators for the seven MS Society-sponsored studies. The health minister accepted the CIHR recommendation and said that Canada was not going to fund clinical trials. The expert panel was created by the end of 2010 together between the CIHR and the MS Society of Canada. It has been proposed that the creation of this expert panel was partly directed to cope with the high levels of social pressure the CCSVI theory had raised and at the same time try to maintain a scientific perspective in the funding and investigation of CCSVI. The main task of the panel was to monitor the results of the ongoing studies in the relationship between CCSVI and MS and recommend the funding of a clinical trial in case that there was evidence of a true relationship between the two. In 2011, the Canadian federal government announced that they would fund clinical trials of the procedure to widen the veins since CIHR considered that evidence of venous abnormalities in MS was enough for small treatment trials. It has been proposed that the recommendation to fund phase I and II trials instead of a big study was a compromise between the high levels of social and political pressure and the low level of evidence on the theory.

Two qualitative studies have investigated the motives and experiences of Canadian patients traveling abroad to get the "liberation procedure". One of the studies identified three factors contributing to patients going abroad seeking treatment: a loss of faith in the Canadian health system when it did not provide access to CCSVI treatment in Canada, hope in the new treatment as a solution for their worsening health, and trust in the MS community and the organizations, clinics and doctors facilitating or providing the desired operation. Conversely, the other study concluded that sense of community and cooperation (from family, MS groups and the general population) was a key motivating factor. Other motivating factors included media reports, perception of approval from their health providers, the apparent low risk of the operation, or accessibility of the hospital that offered the procedure directly or through a medical tourism company. On the other hand, hesitating factors included the cost and effort required for the operation, the mistrust of foreign health systems, the underlying rationale for the operation, or advice against the procedure from trusted health providers.

In 2013, a case-control study found evidence against the involvement of chronic cerebrospinal venous abnormalities in MS. Later in 2013 a study found that vein narrowing appears to be present equally in those with and without MS on ultrasound and catheter venography. The results of the study were described as a "death knell" for Zamboni's theory. Another study released by the University of British Columbia in 2017 was described as a "definitive debunking" of liberation therapy.

=== Organizations ===
Several national and international organizations have been created to further the research and dissemination of the CCSVI theory, such as the International Society for Neurovascular Disease and the National CCSVI Society of Canada. They are working together with already existing organizations like the International Union of Phlebology (Union internationale de phlébologie-UIP- in French, its original working language) of which Zamboni is a member. The UIP for example proposed that developmental abnormalities were the primary cause of CCSVI.

== Research ==
There were further studies aimed at clarifying if there is a relationship between MS and CCSVI. In particular, the US and Canadian MS societies launched seven such studies. Recent reviewers have shown "no significant difference in prevalence of CCSVI in people with MS compared to people without MS". In 2014 imaging criteria for venous abnormalities were published to help with research on this topic.

== See also ==
- Chronic venous insufficiency
- Pathophysiology of multiple sclerosis
- Vascular myelopathy
