= Hero Karizma XMR =

- Manufacturer: Hero MotoCorp
- Production: 2023-present
- Predecessor: Karizma ZMR
- Class: Sport touring motorcycle
- Engine: 210 cc (13 cu in) FI, liquid-cooled (with oil cooler), four-stroke cycle, single
- Bore / stroke: 73 mm × 50 mm (2.9 in × 2.0 in)
- Ignition type: Electric start
- Transmission: 6-speed manual
- Suspension: Front: Telescopic fork, 37 mm travel Rear: Gas mono shocks
- Brakes: Front: 300 mm (disc); Rear: 230 mm disc brake
- Tires: Front:2.75*18; Rear:100*18
- Wheelbase: 1,351 mm (53.2 in)
- Dimensions: L: 2,068 mm (81.4 in); W: 760 mm (30 in); H: 1,110 mm (44 in)
- Fuel capacity: 11 L

The Hero Karizma XMR is a sports bike manufactured by Hero MotoCorp in India. It was launched on 29 August 2023 with a new design and new graphics.
