= Honda Shine =

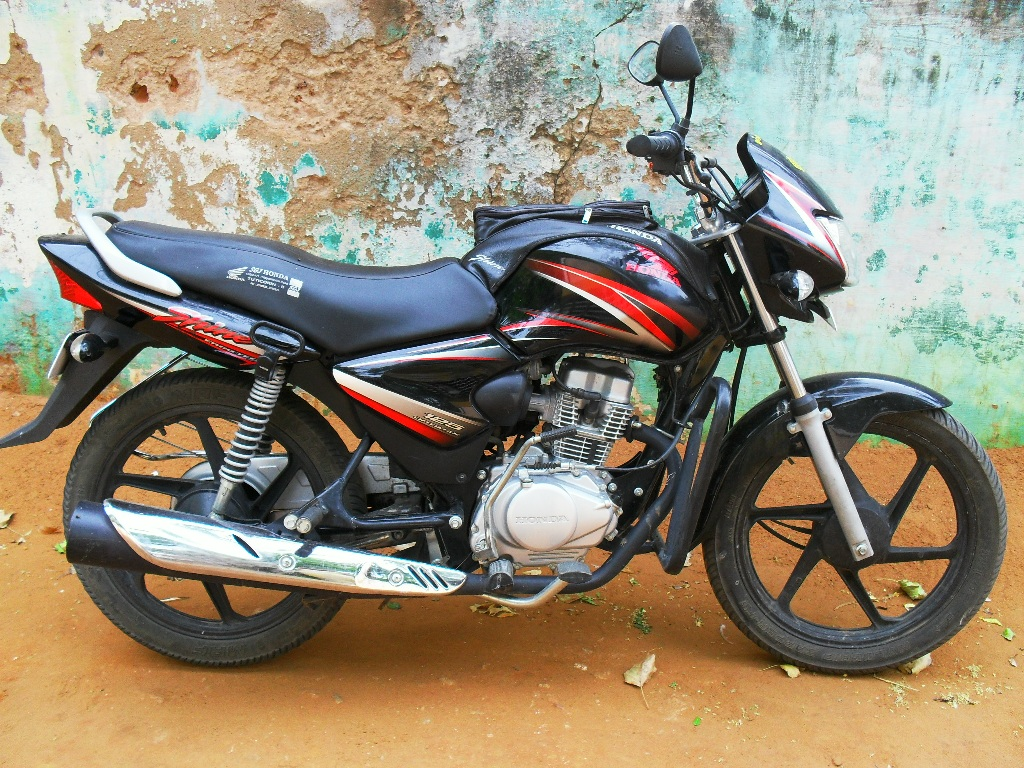
- Manufacturer: HMSI; Bangladesh Honda Private Limited (BHL)
- Also called: Honda CB Shine 2018
- Parent company: Honda
- Production: 2006–present 2019– (Bangladesh)
- Class: Standard
- Engine: 123.94 cc (7.563 cu in) CV fuel injection 4-stroke, air-cooled, single and 98.98 cc (6.040 cu in) CV fuel injection 4-stroke, air-cooled, single
- Power: 7.9 kW (10.6 hp) @ 7500 rpm
- Torque: 11 N⋅m (8.1 lb⋅ft) @ 6000 rpm
- Transmission: 5-speed, constant mesh, manual
- Suspension: Front: Telescopic fork Rear: Three-step spring-loaded hydraulic shock absorber
- Brakes: Front: 130&240 mm disc / drum Rear: 130 drum
- Tires: Tube type, Front: 2.75 in x 18 in Rear: 2.75 in x 18 in
- Wheelbase: 1,266 mm (49.8 in)
- Dimensions: L: 2,014 mm (79.3 in); W: 762 mm (30.0 in); H: 1,071 mm (42.2 in)
- Weight: 121 kg (267 lb) (wet)
- Fuel capacity: 11 L (2.9 US gal) (reserve 1.3 L (0.34 US gal))
- Fuel consumption: 65 km/L (150 mpg_{‑US})

The Honda Shine is a 100cc and 125cc motorcycle developed by Honda Motorcycle & Scooter India (HMSI) and Bangladesh Honda Private Limited (BHL), first introduced in India in 2006. It was a 4-speed motorcycle. It is one of the best-selling motorcycles in India in the 125cc segment. The motorcycle has seen numerous improvements every year as Honda releases new revisions every year that are either cosmetic changes like new colors & graphics, or little features like compliance with Bharat BS-IV emission norms as required in Indian subcontinent. The 2019 Honda CB Shine brings new 5-spoke alloy wheels and chrome featuring headlamps, along with usual graphic changes.

Honda claims that it can accelerate from 0 to 60 km/h (0 to 37 mph) in 5.30 seconds and has a top speed of 95–100 km/h (59–62 mph).

In July, 2019, Bangladesh Honda Private Limited (BHL) launched a Bangladeshi-made version of the CB Shine SP, which is also a 125cc motorcycle – CB Shine SP which comes with a 5-speed gear-box to give smoother ride on high speed. This motorcycle is equipped with Honda Eco Technology (HET) Engine which provides good balance of 10.7 Ps power & 65 kmpl* mileage.

In 2020, HMSI launched a fuel injected version of Honda Shine with a 5 speed gearbox, a higher compression ratio and Enhanced Smart Power (eSP) for "silent" electric start.

In March 2023, HMSI launched a 100cc derivative of Shine with the 100cc single cylinder engine which is priced at 81,242.

Honda Motorcycle and Scooter India revealed that their Shine model two-wheeler has achieved a new milestone - selling one crore bikes since its debut in 2006. Honda claims that Shine is the most desired vehicle in its 125 cc category, with a YTD market share of over 50%, and a remarkable 29% year-on-year growth (data provided by the Society of Indian Automobile Manufacturers). Shine has the distinction of being the first 125cc motorcycle to accumulate one crore(ten million) users.
