= Honda Unicorn =

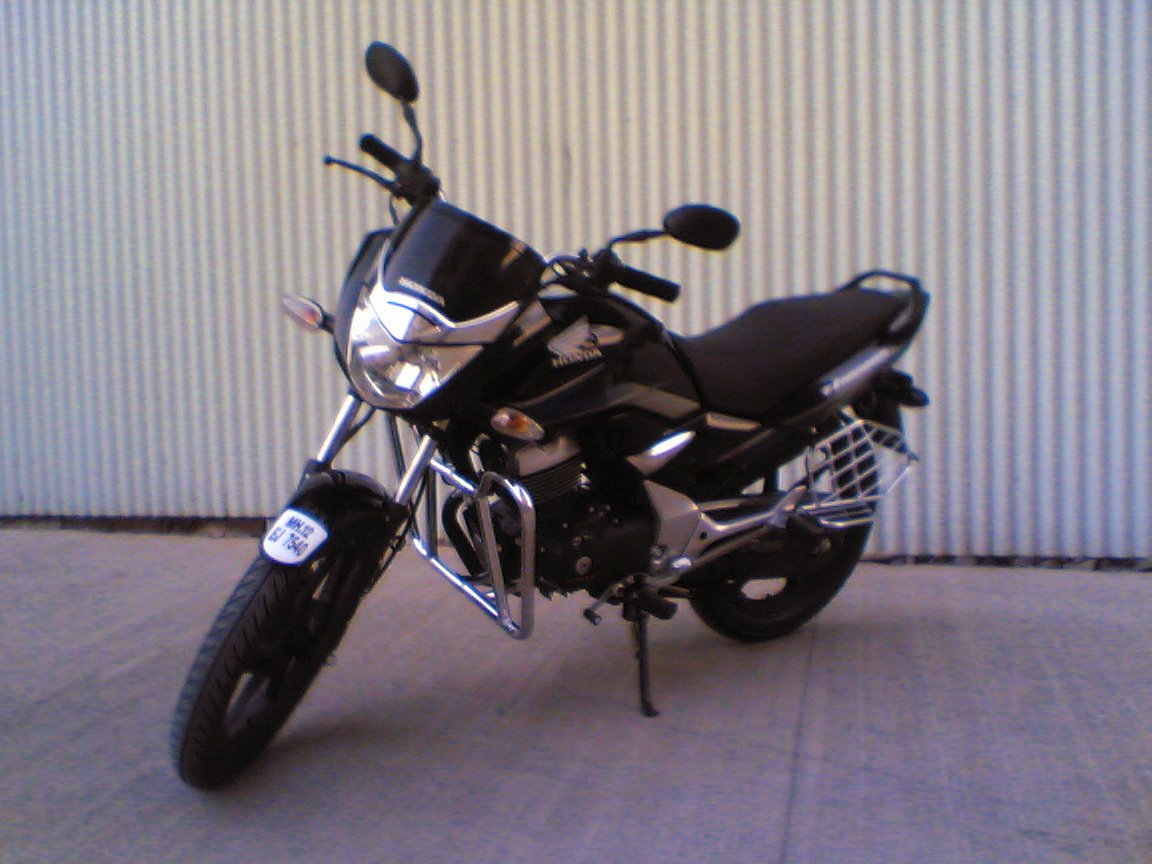
- Manufacturer: Honda Motorcycle and Scooter India
- Also called: Honda MegaPro 150 (for Unicorn imman Indonesia, until 2019); Honda Phantom RR 150 (for Unicorn Dazzler; China, until 2018); Honda CB150 Invicta (for Unicorn Dazzler; Chile)
- Parent company: Honda
- Production: 2004–present
- Class: Standard
- Engine: 162.7 cc (9.93 cu in) CV Fuel injection, 4-stroke, air-cooled, OHC, single
- Bore / stroke: 57.3 mm × 57.8 mm (2.26 in × 2.28 in)
- Top speed: 101 km/h (63 mph) (claimed)
- Power: 9.5 kW (12.7 hp) @ 7500 rpm (claimed)
- Torque: 14 N⋅m (10 lbf⋅ft) @ 5500 rpm (claimed)
- Ignition type: CDI
- Transmission: 5-speed, manual constant mesh
- Suspension: Front telescopic Rear monoshock
- Brakes: Front 240 ABS mm disc Rear 130 mm drum
- Tires: Tube type, Front 2.75 in x 18 in Rear 100/90- 18<
- Wheelbase: 1,336 mm (52.6 in)
- Dimensions: L: 2,092 mm (82.4 in); W: 756 mm (29.8 in); H: 1,100 mm (43 in)
- Weight: 145 kg (320 lb) (claimed) (wet)
- Fuel capacity: 16 L (4.2 US gal)
- Fuel consumption: 60 km/L (170 mpg_{‑imp}; 140 mpg_{‑US}) (claimed)

The Honda Unicorn is a motorcycle developed by Honda Motorcycle and Scooter India and introduced in 2004. It was internally called the CBF150M. The engine was taken from the CRF150F post 2005 engine. The previous version of CRF150F was the old CBZ classic. The design of the bike was done keeping in mind Indian road conditions. Many new features were incorporated, including a two-way air jacket and a diamond frame. The first version of the bike featured spoke wheels and kick start with an optional self-starter.

Honda claimed the Unicorn accelerated from 0 to 60 km/h (0 to 37 mph) in 5 seconds. India Business Insight reported acceleration of 0 to 60 km/h (0 to 37 mph) in 5.28–5.86 seconds, and a top speed of 114 km/h (71 mph).

Honda released this motorcycle to compete with the Bajaj Pulsar and the TVS Apache. Changes included alloy wheels, powder coated engine with a polished head, electric starter, new graphics, clear lens indicator lamps, a trip meter, and a slightly smaller rear grab rail. Performance changes included minor changes in the cylinder head, overhead valve, ignition remapping, and a rear sprocket increase of one tooth, which resulted in increased acceleration at the expense of reduced top speed. The air filter was changed from dry-paper to oil-coated to better suit dusty conditions and a new airflow screw was added to the carburetor. HMSI sold 720,000 Unicorns in 2007. The Unicorn overtook the Bajaj Pulsar to rank highest in its category, the premium segment, in the 2005 Motorcycle Total Customer Satisfaction (MTCS) survey of 7,000 customers conducted by the TNS specialist division, TNS Automotive.

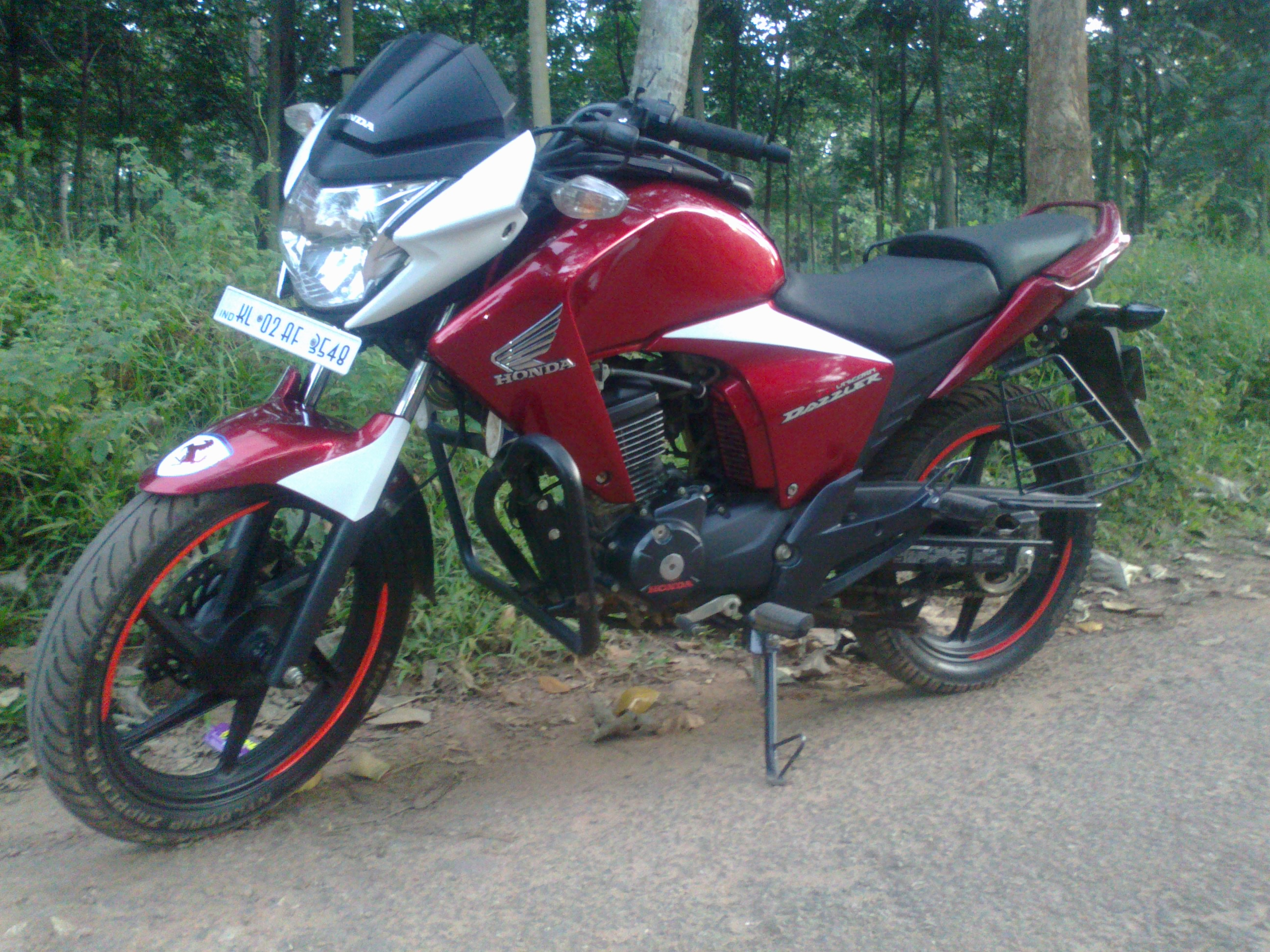
Honda CB Unicorn Dazzler

Honda began selling the Unicorn Dazzler variation in 2010. It has different bodywork and a rear disc brake instead of a drum brake.
