= George Eric Rowe Gedye =

British journalist

George Eric Rowe Gedye (/ˌˈɡɛdiː/; 27 May 1890 – 21 March 1970), often cited as G. E. R. Gedye, was a British journalist and foreign correspondent for eminent British and American newspapers, who rose to prominence for his early warnings about the dangers posed by the rise of fascism in Germany and Austria.

== Life and work ==
Gedye was born in Clevedon, Somerset, the eldest son of George Edward Gedye, a provisions merchant who owned a food canning factory in Bristol, and his wife Lillie (née Rowe). He was educated at Clarence School, Weston-super-Mare, and Queen's College, Taunton.

=== World War I ===
Gedye attended an officer's course at London University, but then fought in the First World War as a simple infantryman on the western front. On the strength of his fluency in German and French, which he had studied at school and night classes, he was promoted to officer and transferred to the British Army Intelligence Corps in 1916. He was first assigned to the staff of the British military governor of Cologne where he was put in charge of interrogating prisoners of war. Later he worked for the Allied High Commissioner for the Rhineland. It was during this earlier period that he became interested in journalism. Presiding over a large source of original information from debriefing prisoners he wrote to The Times offering the occasional article on non-classified information.

=== Documenting the rise of fascism ===
In 1922, Gedye chose a career in journalism. He spent almost two decades working as a reporter for leading British and American newspapers in Central Europe. Based out of Cologne, he was soon known and recognised for his investigative reporting. Gedye's reports for The Times about the 1923 occupation of the Ruhr were an indictment of the imperialist pursuits of Poincaré. Early on he recognised the severe economic restrictions on Germany by the Treaty of Versailles as providing fertile ground for the rise of Nazism. Because of this reporting, he was recalled to London in 1924 to the foreign policy department of The Times. His "daring exploits helped to popularize the romantic image of the foreign correspondent who courted danger in pursuit of the ultimate ‘scoop’."

Believing that Austria would become a crucial listening post for rapidly growing political problems in Central Europe, he asked to be transferred to Vienna. His increasingly alarmist warnings about the dangers of the rise of fascism failed to endear him to his establishment editors and he parted ways with The Times. With a growing reputation for his fearless reportage and extensive contacts, he easily found freelance work, contributing to the Daily Express before settling as The Daily Telegraph Central Europe correspondent and working in the evenings, because of later deadlines, for The New York Times.

Working for both papers from 1929, he was appointed as New York Times bureau chief for Central and South Eastern Europe. He also wrote for other newspapers, including for The Daily Herald and other British newspapers. In Vienna he became known among colleagues as 'The Lone Wolf' for keeping a certain distance from the group of Anglo-Saxon correspondents who often gathered in the city's cafés and bars, including Marcel Fodor, John Gunther and Dorothy Thompson.

Gedye developed leftist politics and helped the young Kim Philby rescue fighters of the Republican Defense Corps. He was forced to leave Vienna in 1938. The Daily Telegraph recalled him to London shortly before the publication of Fallen Bastions (1939). Gedye lost his job with the paper, but the success of Fallen Bastions proved him right — within two months it appeared in five editions. Until 1940, Gedye was the New York Times correspondent in Moscow, having asked to be posted there because of his admiration for communism. Disillusioned, he returned to Europe where he followed up on an earlier offer from the British embassy in Prague to join SOE, the fledgling wartime intelligence service. He and his partner and future wife Litzi spent the war years in Turkey, Cairo, and Istanbul. In 1942, Litzi and Gedye were arrested by the Turkish police. They were soon released and reassigned to the Middle East.

=== After World War II ===
From 1945 Gedye was again a Central Europe correspondent, this time for the socialist London newspaper The Guardian. Among other things, he wrote a series of articles exposing conditions in starving Vienna. A civil assistant with the rank of major in the War Office, Gedye was appointed MBE in 1946. Gedye also wrote against the expulsion of the Sudeten German population from Czechoslovakia after 1945. In 1950, he was appointed bureau chief in Vienna of Radio Free Europe, the American news organisation monitoring and reporting on Communism throughout Europe. Gedye held this post until his retirement in 1967.

== Personal life ==
Gedye was twice married; firstly in 1922, to Liesel Bremer, secondly in 1948, to Alice ('Litzi') Lepper Mehler. Gedye's only son, by his second marriage, Robin Gedye, joined The Daily Telegraph in 1978 where he worked until 1996 as a foreign correspondent. He was expelled from Moscow in 1985 in a tit-for-tat when Margaret Thatcher's government expelled 34 Soviet diplomats. He covered the rise and fall of the Polish free trade union Solidarity and was the newspaper's bureau chief in Germany when the Berlin Wall was breached and for the subsequent years of reunification.

== Works ==
- A Wayfarer in Austria. Methuen & Co Ltd., London 1928.
- The Revolver Republic: France's Bid for the Rhine. Arrowsmith, London 1930.
  Die Revolver-Republik. Frankreichs Werben um den Rhein. Aus dem Englischen von Hans Garduck. Vorwort von Friedrich Grimm. Gilde-Verlag, Köln 1931.
  Excerpts from this work appeared as:
  The French in the Ruhr. From the Revolver Republic. Edited by Maria Alphonsa Beckermann. Schöningh, Paderborn/Würzburg 1935 (Schöninghs englische Lesebogen; Nr. 30)
  The Revolver Republic. Edited by Maria Alphonsa Beckermann. Schöningh, Paderborn/Würzburg 1938 (Schöninghs englische Lesebogen; Nr. 31)
- Heirs To The Habsburgs. With a foreword by G. P. Gooch. J. W. Arrowsmith, Bristol 1932.
- Fallen Bastions. The Central European Tragedy. Victor Gollancz Ltd., London 1939.
  Betrayal in central Europe. Austria and Czechoslovakia, the fallen bastions. New and revised edition. Harper & Brothers, New York 1939.
  Paperback reissue. Faber & Faber 2009. ISBN 978-0571251896.
  Suicide de l'Autriche. La Tragedie de l'Europe Centrale. Texte français de Maximilien Vox. Union latine d' editions, Paris 1940.
  Die Bastionen fielen. Wie der Faschismus Wien und Prag überrannte. Übersetzt von Henriette Werner und Walter Hacker. Danubia, Wien 1947.
  Als die Bastionen fielen. Die Errichtung der Dollfuss-Diktatur und Hitlers Einmarsch in Wien und den Sudeten. Eine Reportage über die Jahre 1927–1938. Nachdruck der deutschen Ausgabe von 1947. Junius, Wien 1981, ISBN 3-900370-01-X.
- Communism in Czechoslovakia. The Contemporary Review Company, London 1952.
- Introducing Austria. Methuen & Co., London 1955.

Collaborations und Contributions:

- La justice militaire. In: Gerhard Wächter: French Troops on the Rhine: A danger to the peace of Europe. G. Heger, Heidelberg 1927. (Nicht im Handel erschienen.)
- We Saw it Happen: The News Behind the News That's Fit to Print. Sammelband, hrsg. von Hanson W. Baldwin and Shepard Stone. Mit Beiträgen von Arthur Krock; F. Raymond Daniell; Frank Nugent; Douglas Churchill; Elliott V. Bell; Ferdinand Kuhn Jr.; Russell Owen; John Kieran; William R. Conklin; Hugh Byas; Brooks Atkinson und Louis Stark. Simon and Schuster, New York 1939.
- Die Wahrheit über den Februar 1934 (The Truth about February 1934). With contributions from: Otto Bauer, Leon Blum, Julius Deutsch, Rosa Jochmann, Theodor Körner, Wilhelmine Moik, Rudolfine Muhr, Adolf Perlmutter, Marianne Pollak, Oscar Pollak, Helene Potetz, Gabriele Prost, Erwin Scharf, Adolf Schärf, Paul Speiser, Emile Vandervelde, Paula Wallisch und P. G. Walker. Sozialistischer Verlag, Wien o. J. (um 1946); (= Sozialistische Hefte, Folge 12).
- Wien. Part of the article: Briefe aus vier Hauptstädten: Krise des Parlamentarismus? (Letters from Four Capitols: Crisis of Parliamentarianism?) In: Der Monat. Eine internationale Zeitschrift für Politik und geistiges Leben. With contributions from: Czesław Miłosz, Oscar Handlin, Arthur Koestler, Gustav Stern, Fritz Brühl, Gustav Mersu und Friedrich Luft. Edited by Melvin J. Lasky. Berlin 1953. 5. Jahrgang, Juni. Heft 57.4.

Translations:

- Ernst Marboe (editor): The Book of Austria. Österreichische Staatsdruckerei, Vienna 1948.

== Literature ==
- Peter Pirker: Subversion deutscher Herrschaft. Der britische Kriegsgeheimdienst SOE und Österreich. Vienna University Press, Göttingen 2012, ISBN 978-3-89971-990-1
- Thomas Wittek: Auf ewig Feind? Das Deutschlandbild in den britischen Massenmedien nach dem Ersten Weltkrieg. Dissertation. Oldenbourg Verlag, München 2005, ISBN 3-486-57846-4 (, p. 110, at Google Books).
- Matthew Frank: Expelling the Germans (, p. 183, at Google Books).
