= Office of Military Government, United States =

Government of Germany following World War II

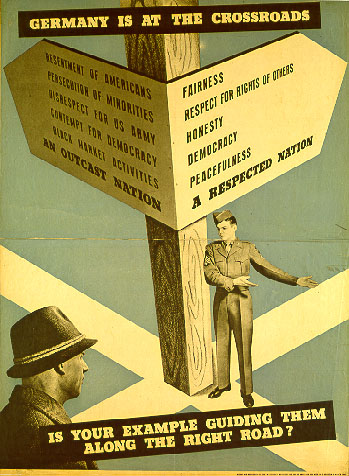
Propaganda poster "Reeducation" (German: Umerziehung), 1947.

The Office of Military Government, United States (OMGUS; German: Amt der Militärregierung für Deutschland (U.S.)) was the United States military-established government created shortly after the end of hostilities in occupied Germany in World War II. Under General Lucius D. Clay, it administered the area of Germany and sector of Berlin controlled by the United States Army. The Allied Control Council comprised military authorities from the United States, the United Kingdom, the Soviet Union and France. Though created on January 1, 1946, OMGUS previously reported to the U.S. Group Control Council, Germany (USGCC), which existed from May 8, 1945, until October 1, 1945. OMGUS was eliminated on December 5, 1949, and the U.S. High Commissioner for Germany assumed control of its functions.

The Restitution and Reparations Branch of OMGUS located and returned material to countries from which claimed property had been looted by the Nazis during World War II.

OMGUS in 1945 began its own newspaper based in Munich, Die Neue Zeitung. It was edited by German and Jewish émigrés who fled to the United States before the war. Its mission was to destroy Nazi cultural remnants, and encourage democracy by exposing Germans to how American culture operated. There was great detail on sports, politics, business, Hollywood, and fashions, as well as international affairs.

== Origins ==
More than 90% of forces in the American occupation zone in Germany after World War 2 were ground units. The United States Army was thus tasked with the occupation, denazification, and democratization of post-war Germany. The occupation was plagued by numerous problems immediately following the capitulation of Germany and the cessation of hostilities. One such problem was confusion emanating from the numerous chain of command and military authorities that succeeded the German occupation from May 1945 onwards. Initially, neither the United States Executive, nor the US Army wanted the responsibility of occupying Germany and seeing it along the path of democratization, though inevitably the US Army was given the task by default, "as the only force that had the logistic and administrative capability to perform the mission." One of the primary reasons for this outcome was the precedent of US military governance well before the initiation of post-war planning and the official formation of OMGUS to administer civil affairs. This precedent was accomplished through the publication of two Army field manuals, FM 27–5, Military Governance, and FM 27–10, The Rules of Land Warfare, as early as 1940, setting the stage for future occupation policy. The invasion and occupation of Sicily in 1943 saw the creation of a Military Government Provisional Section (G-5 Civil-Affairs Staff Office) within the 7th Army on the order of Supreme Allied Commander for the Allied Expeditionary forces (SHAEF) Dwight D. Eisenhower, which would become the basis for military government in occupied Germany. Following suit, the US Third Army created its own G-5 Staff Office to administer the territories it occupied.

Compounding the issue were unstable boundaries of US Army divisions at the time of Germany's capitulation, in which the US Third Army assumed direct command of the administration of the Eastern Military District (Bavaria) under General George S. Patton, and the US Seventh Army commanding the Western Military District (Greater Hesse, and Wurttemberg-Baden), with the civil-affairs staff of each Army reporting to their commanding officer. Following the dissolution of SHAEF on July 17, 1945, both of these districts reported to United States Forces - European Theater (USFET) Command under General Eisenhower, "dual-hatted as both USFET Commander and Military-Governor of Germany," until his appointment to the Joint-Chiefs of Staff. Alongside USFET and the Military Government of Germany was the US Group Control Council, headquartered in Berlin and commanded by General Lucius D. Clay. As Deputy Military Governor of Germany, Clay advocated for the separation of Military Government from Army Command, in which the Deputy Governor would answer directly to the Theater Commander. In the fall of 1945, Clay redesignated the GCC as the Office of Military Government, United States in Berlin, consolidating all military government offices in Germany independent of the Army Command in Frankfurt. Eisenhower's departure saw to the succession of General Lucius Clay as USFET Commander and Military Governor of Germany, who would remain so throughout the duration of OMGUS from 1945 to 1949.

Additionally, OMGUS and indeed the US Army in general experienced severe personnel shortages. Faced with the impending uncertainty of the post-war occupation after four years of war, most soldiers left Germany as soon as their ticket came up. The lack of Army personnel, as well as the depleted number of Germans either not killed, interned after the war, or identified as a Nazi, desperately compounded administrative issues. The Court of Appeals for Germans wanting to appeal their Frageboden status required nearly 22,000 staffers.

After press criticism, President Harry Truman sent Byron Price to, over ten weeks, "survey the general subject of relations between the American Forces of Occupation and the German people". Released on 28 November 1945, the Price report said that "Taken altogether it [military government] seems to me a notable record of progress, whatever may be said by noisy backseat drivers ... In no other zone of Germany has greater progress been made toward the declared objectives of the Allied occupation". However, "The United States must decide whether we mean to finish the job competently, and provide the tools, the determination and the funds requisite to that purpose, or withdraw".

== Structure ==
Structurally, OMGUS was composed of five independent US Military Government Offices (Landkreis), OMG Wurttemberg-Baden, OMG Greater Hesse, OMG Bavaria, OMG Bremen, and OMG Berlin. These five independent offices reported directly to the Office of Military Government – US Zone stationed at Frankfurt-am-Main, Greater Hesse, which served as the headquarters for OMGUS, and the Military Governor. Up until the municipal elections held in February 1946, the job of civil administration and security was conducted by the 3rd and 7th Armies at the tactical level, with detached G-5 liaison offices reporting to the military governors of each independent office, who in turn reported to the Military-Governor.

Additionally, a parallel chain of command existed to that of OMGUS through the Allied Control Council (ACC), which coordinated and conducted the Joint-Allied occupation of Germany amongst the various occupying powers. The Allied Control Council (ACC) assumed the highest Joint-Allied authority in Germany where the OMGUS Military Governor met to coordinate with the other military commanders of the various Allies undertaking the German occupation. Immediately below was the Coordinateing Committee, which served many of the same functions of the ACC amongst the Deputy Military Governors, as well as the Allied Control Staff. While the other Offices of Military Government answered to OMGUS and the Military Governor, OMG Berlin, answered to the Berlin Kommandsatura under the auspices of the ACC, from which the various military administrators coordinated the four Allied sections of occupied Berlin

In the months of October, November, and December, a great deal of civil administration and denazification was carried out by German appointees operating under the penultimate authority of USFET. In this case, a Council-Minister was appointed for each of the administrative occupied zones (Lander), and in October, 1945, General Clay established the Council of Minister-Presidents (Länderrat), which would serve the immediate responsibilities of civil affairs until the formation of the Federation of West Germany in 1949, as well as the basis for a new German-elected parliament.

The longest-serving Military Governor of OMGUS, from 1946 until his resignation on May 15, 1949, was General Lucius Clay. Clay was succeeded by General John J. McCloy. Internally, each of the Office of Military Government Offices in the US Zone was commanded by a brigadier general.

Additionally, a number of offices served directly under the OMGUS chain of command. This included the Information Control Division, tasked with carrying out the ideological censorship and denazification propaganda in US zones of occupation.

== Propaganda under OMGUS ==
Propaganda and information control in Allied occupied Germany was a primary tool utilized by OMGUS and the Allies. This informational control was informed by two concurrent processes occurring in the wake of the Second World War. The first, denazification, was a primary objective of OMGUS and served to root out whatever remained of the Nazi Party, its associations with German society, and its ideology, particularly from 1945 to 1947. This propaganda was disseminated to persuade the German people of the finality of their defeat in World War II, as well as to pave the way for US designs of democratization in Germany. The other, taking much more precedence in the later years of OMGUS from 1947 to 1949, was the increasing competition for political, economic, and cultural influence between the Western Allies and the Soviet Union as Germany became increasingly divided between the two ideologically divided super-powers.

OMGUS’ informational control constituted a vast campaign of mass media dissemination in the form of newspapers, radios, journals, films, conferences, posters, and even musical and artistic exhibitions. Much of this campaign was carried out by the Information Control Division (ICD). Formerly the psychological warfare division of Supreme Headquarters Allied Expeditionary Force (SHAEF) up until the conclusion of hostilities, the ICD was formed as an independent office until being absorbed by OMGUS in February 1946.

The chronology of the US Army's informational control policy and propaganda campaign can be broken-down into three main stages including their assertion of a media monopoly by the US Army during the initial occupation, a combination of active censorship and propaganda, and finally an active propaganda campaign in the midst of the Cold War.

During the initial first months of the US occupation of Germany, the US Army proceeded to create a monopoly over informational and mass media, shutting down newspapers, radios, and journals. As such, US media sources were the only mass media available in occupied Germany, provided primarily by Radio Luxembourg, US Army information fliers (Mitteilungblätter), and Army newspapers.

With the assumption of control by the Office of Military Government, this process of media monopolization gave way to gradual inclusion of German media under the auspices of strict censorship and oversight by the ICD. In 1945, the ICD assessed and vetted an initial 73 German editors to resume operations of paper media, newspapers, and journals. Though the ICD and OMGUS assumed a stance of open and positive inclusion by Germans removed from Nazi affiliation, these editors operated under conditions of post-publication censorship, whereby non-compliance could lead to the revocation of media licenses. OMGUS itself created a number of mass media institutions itself including the newspaper Die Neue Zeitung in 1945 in Munich, Bavaria.

While initial US attitudes towards German press and media focused on denazification and the promotion of diversity, 1947 brought about a decidedly new focus on anti-Communism. Those who did not conform to the anti-Communist directives of OMGUS, "were either terminated or had their editors replaced."
