= General McClure =

General McClure may refer to:

- Nathaniel Fish McClure (1865–1942), U.S. Army brigadier general
- Robert A. McClure (1897–1957), U.S. Army major general
- Robert B. McClure (1896–1973), U.S. Army major general
