= Robert Lembke =

German television presenter (1913–1989)

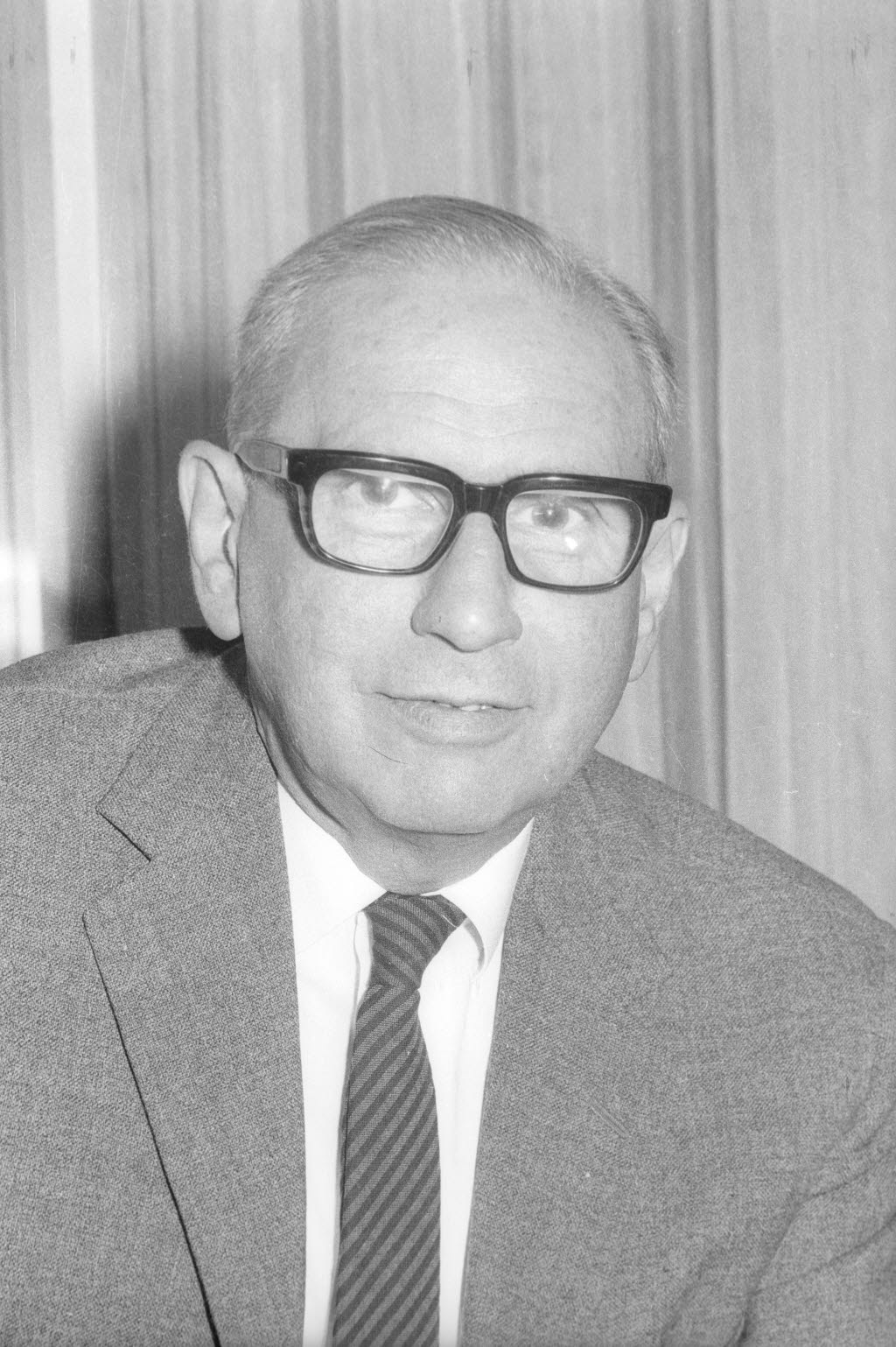
Robert Lembke, 1969.

Robert Lembke (Robert Emil Weichselbaum) (17 September 1913 – 14 January 1989) was a German television presenter and game show host.

== Life ==
Lembke was born in Munich in 1913. He started to study law at the age of 18, but dropped out of college. He then worked as a newspaper journalist (Berliner Tageblatt and Simplicissimus). He refused to sign a loyalty oath to Adolf Hitler and was subsequently barred from working as a journalist in Nazi Germany. He then took a job at IG Farben. His Jewish father had fled to England in 1936. In 1935, Lembke married Mathilde Bertholt and three years later they had a daughter.

After World War II Lembke worked as a journalist. Together with Hans Habe, Erich Kästner and Stefan Heym Lembke started German newspaper Die Neue Zeitung in Munich.
Since 1949 Lembke worked for German broadcaster Bayerischer Rundfunk. Lembke was, from 1961 to his death in 1989, game show host of What's My Line? (German: Was bin ich?) on ARD television.

== Awards ==
- 1968: Goldene Kamera in Category Best Moderation for Was bin ich?
- 1970: Bavarian Order of Merit
- 1983: Goldene Kamera in Category Camera 30 Jahre Fernsehen
- 1985: Bambi Award
