= Die Neue Zeitung =

American newspaper in post-war Germany (1945–1955)

Masthead of a special edition of Die Neue Zeitung, Berlin Edition, 24 June 1948. The headline reads, "How Berlin Got the German Mark". Exchange of the old reichsmark for the new German mark in June 1948 was a vital step in the reform of Germany's postwar economy and set off the Soviet blockade of Berlin and the subsequent Berlin Airlift.

Die Neue Zeitung ("The New Times", abbreviated NZ) was a newspaper published in the American Occupation Zone of Germany after the Second World War. It was comparable to the daily newspaper Die Welt in the British Occupation Zone and was considered the most important newspaper in post-war Germany.

== History ==
Die Neue Zeitung was first published on 17 October 1945 in Munich and continued publication until 30 January 1955. The paper was initially published twice weekly, later increasing to six times a week.

=== American-controlled media outlet ===
The Information Control Division of the American Occupation Authority acted as publisher of the newspaper. Although the Division allowed German editors and journalists to write, it never gave up ultimate editorial control of the publication. This was made clear in the newspaper's title bar: "Die Neue Zeitung – An American newspaper for the German people".

Die Neue Zeitung was considered a means of political re-education for the German population by its American publishers, who hoped that other newspapers would emulate it. MAJ Hans Habe and MAJ Hans Wallenberg, who had edited newspapers in Germany and Austria before the war, supervised the staff which was all-American at first, but later included Germans to train them. From November 1945 American news and opinion was half of the content, a quarter was world news, and a quarter was national German news.

Demand was very strong, circulation rising from 500,000 to 1,500,000 in two months; 3,000,000 copies could have been sold had enough newsprint been available. One survey found that half of readers preferred Die Neue Zeitung to any German newspaper the military government licensed, but after 1949 could not keep up with competition amid the rapid re-growth of the newspaper industry in Germany.

=== Berlin edition ===
Starting in early 1947, the American Sector of Berlin had its own separate edition of the NZ. This Berlin edition made sense because in Berlin, the former German capital, the Allied Control Council had strong influence and the interests of the Soviet Union and United States were increasingly at odds. Publication of the NZ in Berlin was seen as necessary to prevent the Sovietization of the Germans there. The NZ in Berlin operated autonomously under the editorship of Marcel Fodor.

The feature section of the Berlin NZ – the so-called Feuilleton, covering literature, art, and culture – was under the direction of Friedrich Luft, long known for his theater reviews in the RIAS ("Rundfunk im amerikanischen Sektor", the radio and TV broadcasting service in the American Sector of Berlin). Hans Schwab-Felisch was another prominent contributor to the Berlin edition's Feuilleton. Schwab-Felisch later worked at the Frankfurter Allgemeine Zeitung and became editor of Merkur, Germany's leading intellectual review. Other contributors to the Feuilleton included freelancers Will Grohmann (fine arts) and Hans Heinz Stuckenschmidt (music).

=== Later developments and end of publication ===
Starting in June 1949 a Frankfurt edition of Die Neue Zeitung was established. In 1951, the Munich and Frankfurt editions were merged into a single Frankfurt edition. After September 1953, the Neue Zeitung appeared only in Berlin. In March 1955, the paper ceased operations entirely.

== Contributors ==
The following are some of the contributors to Die Neue Zeitung.

The author Erich Kästner was senior editor of the feature section (Feuilleton). Robert Lembke, later a television personality, directed the section on domestic politics.

Other prominent contributors include:

- Theodor W. Adorno
- Alfred Andersch
- Heinrich Böll
- Bertolt Brecht
- Alfred Döblin
- Günter Eich
- Ludwig Erhard
- Max Frisch
- Will Grohmann
- Romano Guardini
- Hildegard Hamm-Brücher
- Hans Habe
- Hermann Hesse
- Stefan Heym
- Wolfgang Hildesheimer
- Karl Jaspers
- Alfred Kerr
- Hermann Kesten
- Elisabeth Langgässer
- Eugen Kogon
- Heinrich and Thomas Mann
- Siegfried Maruhn
- Alexander Mitscherlich
- Martin Niemöller
- Heinz Ohff
- Sigismund von Radecki
- Luise Rinser
- Oda Schaefer
- Franz Joseph Schneider
- Wolf Schneider
- Kurt Schumacher
- Anna Seghers
- Wolf Jobst Siedler
- Hans Wallenberg
- Günther Weisenborn
- Franz Werfel
- Ernst Wiechert
- Carl Zuckmayer

The political cartoonist was Paul Flora.

== Sources ==
- Jessica C. E. Gienow-Hecht: Art is democracy and democracy is art: Culture, propaganda, and the Neue Zeitung in Germany. In: Diplomatic History (1999) 23#1, S. 21–43.
- Jessica C. E. Gienow-Hecht. American Journalism as Cultural Diplomacy in Postwar Germany, 1945–1955. Baton Rouge: Louisiana State University Press, 1999.
- Wilfried F. Schoeller (editor): Diese merkwürdige Zeit. Leben nach der Stunde Null. Ein Textbuch aus der „Neuen Zeitung“. (This remarkable time: Life after the Zero Hour. A textbook from the Neue Zeitung.) Frankfurt am Main: Büchergilde Gutenberg, 2005. ISBN 3-7632-5555-9.
- Irmtraud Ubbens: Amerikanisches Leben als Erfahrung und Erlebnis. Moritz Goldstein schreibt von 1950–1954 für die „Neue Zeitung“. (American Life as Lived Experience: Mortiz Goldstein writes for the Neue Zeitung from 1950–54.) In: Jahrbuch für Kommunikationsgeschichte, Bd. 14. Stuttgart: Franz Steiner 2012, ISSN 1438-4485, S. 152–185.
- Jürgen Wilke (editor): Mediengeschichte der Bundesrepublik Deutschland (History of the Media in the Federal Republic of Germany), Bundeszentrale für politische Bildung Schriftenreihe, Band 361, Bonn 1999.
