= William Eckert =

United States Air Force general and Commissioner of Baseball

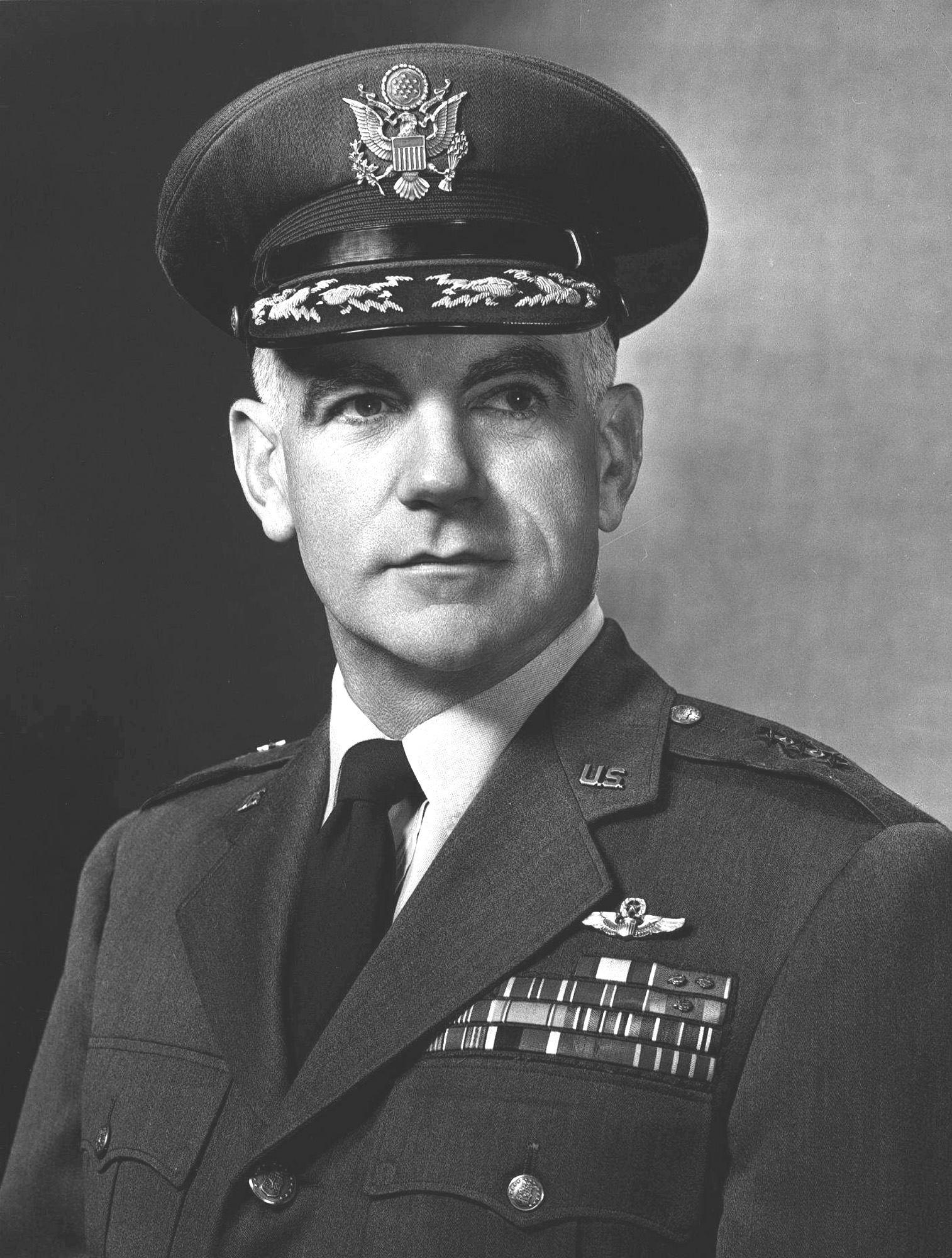

4th Commissioner of Baseball
- In office November 17, 1965 – December 6, 1968
- Preceded by: Ford C. Frick
- Succeeded by: Bowie Kuhn

Personal details
- Born: William Dole Eckert; January 20, 1909 Freeport, Illinois, U.S.
- Died: April 16, 1971 (aged 62) Freeport, Bahamas
- Education: United States Military Academy; Harvard University (MBA)
- Nickname: "Spike"

Military service
- Allegiance: United States
- Branch/service: United States Army; United States Army Air Corps; United States Air Force
- Years of service: 1930–1961
- Rank: Lieutenant General
- Commands: 452nd Bomb Group
- Battles/wars: World War II
- Awards: Distinguished Service Medal; Legion of Merit

William Dole Eckert (January 20, 1909 – April 16, 1971) was a lieutenant general in the United States Air Force, and later the fourth commissioner of Major League Baseball from 1965 to 1968.

== Personal life, career, and death ==
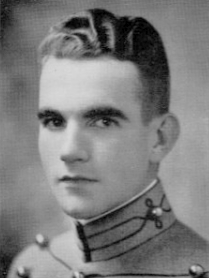
As a West Point cadet

William Eckert was born on January 20, 1909, in Freeport, Illinois, to Frank Lloyd and Harriet Julia (née Rudy) Eckert. His mother had previously been married to George H. McClure, so Eckert had three half-siblings, including Robert A. McClure. The Eckert family moved to Indiana, settling in Madison. In 1924, at age 15, Eckert enlisted in the Indiana National Guard.

Eckert matriculated at the U.S. Military Academy at West Point in July 1926. It was there that he earned the nickname "Spike" while playing intramural football. He also played intramural baseball while at West Point. He graduated in June 1930.

Eckert served in the U.S. military from 1930 to 1961. In 1940, he married Catherine Douglas Givens. They had two children – William Douglas Eckert and Catherine Julia Eckert.

Upon retirement from the U.S. Air Force in 1961, Eckert was a management consultant and served on the board of directors of several companies. He was the Commissioner of Baseball from 1965 to 1968.

Eckert died in 1971 of a heart attack, while playing tennis in the Bahamas. Eckert is buried in Arlington National Cemetery along with his wife, Catharine Givens Eckert (1919–1995).

== Military career ==
=== 1930–1940 ===
In 1930, upon graduation from West Point, Eckert was appointed a second lieutenant of Field Artillery in the Regular Army.

He then attended the Air Corps Flying Schools at Brooks and Kelly Fields in San Antonio, Texas, graduating in October 1931 and was transferred to the Air Corps Advanced Flying School at Kelly Field, Texas. Two months later he transferred to the United States Army Air Corps and was assigned to Selfridge Field, Michigan, for duty with the 36th Pursuit Squadron.

In April 1935, Eckert joined the 29th Pursuit Squadron at Albrook Field, Panama Canal Zone, where he was stationed from 1935 to 1937.

In May 1937, he was named a flying instructor at the Air Corps Primary Flying School at Randolph Field, Texas.

In September 1938, he was selected as one of two officers for advanced education at the Harvard Graduate School of Business Administration and in June 1940 graduated with a master's degree.

=== 1940–1950 ===
After graduating from Harvard, he was assigned to Wright Field, Ohio where he served successively as Production Executive, Comptroller, and as Executive of the Materiel Command.

In January 1944, Eckert entered the Army and Navy Staff College. Upon graduation two months later, Colonel Eckert was assigned to Europe as commander of the 452nd Bomb Group (August 1944 – September 1944) He later served in the European theater as chief of maintenance and chief of supply of the Ninth Air Force Service Command.

In July 1945, Eckert was assigned as executive in the Office of the Assistant Chief of Staff for Materiel at Air Force headquarters, and later was appointed chief of the Readjustment and Procurement Division of that office. In November 1947, he was assigned to the Office of the Secretary of the Air Force and two months later became executive to the Undersecretary of the Air Force .

In April 1949, Eckert became comptroller of Air Materiel Command at Wright-Patterson Air Force Base, Ohio.

=== 1950–retirement (1961) ===
In October 1951, while comptroller of the Air Materiel Command, Ekhert assumed additional duty as deputy commander of the Air Materiel Command.

Eckert was transferred to Air Force headquarters in June 1952 for duty as assistant deputy chief of staff for materiel.

On July 15, 1956, he reported to Tactical Air Command, Langley Air Force Base, Virginia to assume the duties of deputy commander (redesignated vice commander November 5, 1956).

In 1957, at the age of 48, Eckert was promoted to the rank of lieutenant general, making him the youngest three-star officer in the United States Armed Forces.

On February 1, 1960, Eckert was assigned to Headquarters U.S. Air Force for duty as Deputy Chief of Staff, Comptroller of the Air Force. However, after suffering a heart attack in early 1961, he retired from active duty on April 1. On the day of his retirement, was awarded the Distinguished Service Medal for his career achievements in the Air Force.

=== Promotions ===
Eckert's promotions during his military career are as follows:

- 2nd Lieutenant – June 1930
- 1st Lieutenant (temporary) – May 8, 1935
- 1st Lieutenant (permanent) – August 1, 1935
- Captain – June 12, 1940
- Major (temporary) – July 15, 1941
- Lieutenant Colonel (temporary) – January 5, 1942
- Colonel (temporary) – August 1, 1944
- Major (permanent) – June 12, 1947
- Colonel (permanent) – April 2, 1948
- Brigadier General (temporary) – April 14, 1948
- Major General (temporary) – July 28, 1951
- Brigadier General (permanent) – July 21, 1952
- Major General (permanent) – September 4, 1951
- Lieutenant General – August 29, 1957

=== Decorations ===
His military decorations, in addition to the Distinguished Service Medal, also include the Legion of Merit with two oak leaf clusters, Distinguished Flying Cross, Bronze Star Medal, Air Medal, and various foreign medals.

He was rated a bomber, command pilot, and technical observer.

== Commissioner of Major League Baseball ==
Eckert served as the commissioner of Major League Baseball from 1965 to 1968.

More than 150 names appeared on the original list of nominees for the commissionership following Ford Frick's retirement. The club owners initially were unable to decide if the next commissioner should come from the ranks of the game (e.g., the president of the American or National Leagues) or elsewhere. They finally decided that the new commissioner should have a strong business background to deal with the problems that were confronting the game at the time.

Eckert had not appeared on any lists of prospective candidates at first. He only became a serious candidate for the commissionership after fellow officer Curtis LeMay gave Major League Baseball a recommendation for him. On November 17, 1965, by a unanimous vote of the then-20 major league club owners, Eckert became the fourth commissioner of Major League Baseball.

When he became commissioner, Eckert had not seen a baseball game in person in over ten years. He was almost completely unknown to the public, leading sportswriters to nickname him "the Unknown Soldier."

He incurred the public's ire by refusing to cancel games after the assassinations of Sen. Robert F. Kennedy and Martin Luther King Jr., and team owners' disdain because he refused to deal forcefully with substantive business issues. By 1968, the owners anticipated a players' strike, and had long since lost confidence in Eckert's ability to handle the situation. For this reason, Eckert was forced to resign at the end of the season, although he still had three years remaining on his contract. He resigned as commissioner in December 1968. Bowie Kuhn was appointed the interim commissioner.

In spite of his much publicized failures and shortcomings, Eckert also developed more effective committee actions, streamlined business methods and helped stabilize franchises with bigger stadiums and long-term leases. In addition, Eckert worked hard toward promoting the game internationally, including a 1966 tour of Japan by the Los Angeles Dodgers.
