= Wolf Schneider =

German journalist (1925–2022)

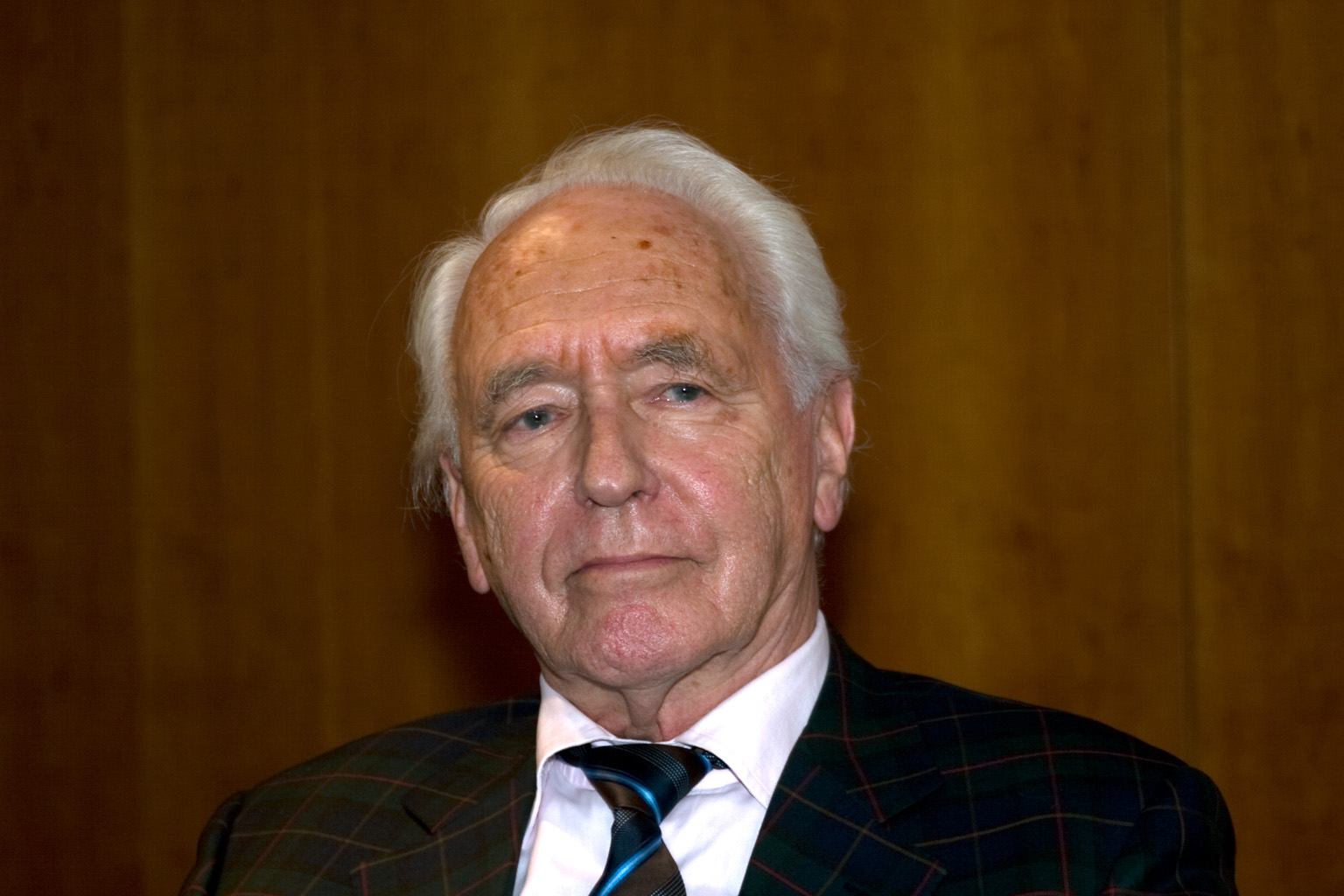
- Schneider in 2010
- Born: 7 May 1925; Erfurt, Province of Saxony, Prussia, Germany
- Died: 11 November 2022 (aged 97); Starnberg, Bavaria, Germany
- Occupations: Journalist; author; language critic
- Spouses: Anna Burgmeier (m. 1949; div. 1965); Elisabeth-Charlotte Riemann (m. 1965)
- Children: 3, including Curt

Wolf Dietrich Schneider (7 May 1925 – 11 November 2022) was a German journalist, author, and language critic. After World War II, he learned journalism on the job with Die Neue Zeitung, a newspaper published by the US military government. He later worked as a correspondent in Washington, D.C., for the Süddeutsche Zeitung, then as editor-in-chief and from 1969 manager of the publishing house of Stern. He moved to the Springer Press in 1971. From 1979 to 1995, he was the first director of a school for journalists in Hamburg, shaping generations of journalists. He wrote many publications about the German language, becoming an authority. He promoted a concise style, and opposed anglicisms and the German orthography reform.

== Life ==
Schneider was born on 7 May 1925 in Erfurt and grew up in Berlin. Having passed his Abitur, he served with the Luftwaffe until the end of the Second World War. His post-war career began as a translator for the US Army, and in 1947 he joined the Munich-based Neue Zeitung, a newspaper run by the US military government. It was here that he received journalistic training and later worked as an editor. In the early 1950s Schneider was a correspondent for the news agency AP; in later years he was in charge of the news team and correspondent in Washington for the Süddeutsche Zeitung.

In 1966, Schneider joined Stern magazine, where he worked as editor-in-chief, and from 1969 as manager of the publishing house. German media tycoon Axel Springer hired Schneider in 1971 to design the news magazine Dialog, aimed at challenging Der Spiegel's dominant position in the German market. The project ended in failure, however, and Schneider was appointed editor-in-chief of Springer's conservative daily Die Welt, based in Hamburg. Springer dismissed Schneider after only one year.

Schneider remained at Springer as editor-in-chief without portfolio. In 1979, he was appointed the inaugural director of the newly founded Hamburger Journalistenschule, which later became known as Henri-Nannen-Schule. He was to hold this position until 1995. He taught hundreds of students, many of whom are now in prominent positions. He also became widely known during this time as the godfather of concise German prose.

In the 1980s and early 1990s, Schneider also presented the NDR Talk Show.

Schneider was married and a father of three children. He lived in Starnberg, where he died on 11 November 2022 at the age of 97.

== Language critic ==
From 1995, Schneider was a lecturer on the German language, and gave seminars for press officers and young journalists. He was a prolific writer and produced 28 best-selling nonfiction books, among them staple works on proper German style (e.g. "German for life. What school forgot to teach"). His last works were "Speak German", a defence of the German language in the face of anglicisms, and Man: a Career, which tells the story of mankind's rise to mastery of the earth, and plots our uncertain future.

Schneider's ideal was a concise written style, avoiding the typically-German pitfalls of rambling sentences, separated verbs, and complex constructions. Schneider was a critic of the German orthography reform and founded with others the pressure group Aktion Lebendiges Deutsch (Living German). Schneider opposed gender neutrality in the German language.

== Awards ==
Schneider received several prizes, including the Henri Nannen Prize for his life's work, and the media prize for language culture (Medienpreis für Sprachkultur) of the Gesellschaft für deutsche Sprache. He held a chair as honorary professor at the University of Salzburg.

== Publications ==
=== On language ===
- Wörter machen Leute : Magie und Macht der Sprache (in German). Munich: Piper Verlag. 1976. ISBN 3-492-02218-9. OCLC 2781113.
- Deutsch für Profis : Wege zu gutem Stil (in German). illustrated by Luis Murschetz. Munich: Goldmann. 2001 [1982]. ISBN 3-442-16175-4. OCLC 248928080.
- Heiner Bremer, ed. (1987). Deutsch für Kenner : Die neue Stilkunde (in German). Hamburg: Gruner + Jahr. ISBN 3-570-07958-9. OCLC 17385563. (21st ed. in 2011)
- Deutsch fürs Leben : Was die Schule zu lehren vergass (in German). Reinbek bei Hamburg: Rowohlt Verlag. 1994. ISBN 978-3-499-19695-9. OCLC 263552413.
- Deutsch für Werber (in German). Bonn: Edition Publikumszeitschriften. 1997.
- Deutsch! das Handbuch für attraktive Texte (in German). Reinbek bei Hamburg: Rowohlt Verlag. 2005. ISBN 978-3-498-06381-8. OCLC 76561621.
- Speak German! : Warum Deutsch manchmal besser ist (in German). Reinbek bei Hamburg: Rowohlt Verlag. 2008. ISBN 978-3-498-06393-1. OCLC 225871884.
- Gewönne doch der Konjunktiv! Sprachwitz in 66 Lektionen (in German). Reinbek bei Hamburg: Rowohlt Verlag. 2009. ISBN 978-3-499-62463-6. OCLC 699916394.
- Deutsch lebt! Ein Appell zum Aufwachen (in German). Walter Krämer et al. (2nd ed.). Paderborn: Institut für Betriebslinguistik IFB, Verlag Deutsche Sprache. 2010. ISBN 978-3-942409-01-8.
- Deutsch für junge Profis : Wie man gut und lebendig schreibt (in German). Reinbek bei Hamburg: Rowohlt Verlag. 2011. ISBN 978-3-499-62629-6. OCLC 724778708.

=== On journalism ===
- Unsere tägliche Desinformation: Wie die Massenmedien uns in die Irre führen (in German). With 5 graduates of the Henri-Nannen-Schule; illustrations by Luis Murschetz (5th ed.). Hamburg: Gruner + Jahr. 1992 [1984]. ISBN 3-570-03915-3.
- Die Gruner + Jahr Story : ein Stück deutsche Pressegeschichte (in German). Munich: Piper Verlag. 2000. ISBN 3-492-04265-1. OCLC 45036247.
- with Paul-Josef Raue (2003). Das neue Handbuch des Journalismus (in German). Reinbek bei Hamburg: Rowohlt Verlag. ISBN 978-3-499-61569-6. OCLC 231977538.
- Wörter waschen : 26 gute Gründe, politischen Begriffen zu misstrauen (in German). Reinbek bei Hamburg: Rowohlt Taschenbuch Verlag. 2006. ISBN 3-499-62106-1. OCLC 69105022.
- with Detlef Esslinger (2007). Die Überschrift – Sachzwänge, Fallstricke, Versuchungen, Rezepte (in German). Econpublication-place=Berlin. ISBN 978-3-430-20021-9. OCLC 180071289.

=== Other topics ===
- Überall ist Babylon. Die Stadt als Schicksal der Menschen von Ur bis Utopia. Econ, Düsseldorf 1960
- Essen – Geschichte des Ruhrgebiets und seiner Metropole (in German) (5th ed.). Econ. 1991 [1963]. ISBN 3-430-18011-2. Also as Essen : Abenteuer einer Stadt (in German) (completely revised ed.). Düsseldorf: Econ-Verlag. 1978. ISBN 3-430-18011-2. OCLC 5311010.
- Das Buch vom Soldaten – Geschichte und Porträt einer umstrittenen Gestalt. Econ, Düsseldorf 1964 GND 560899963
- Glück, was ist das? : Traum u. Wirklichkeit (in German). Munich: Piper Verlag. 1978. ISBN 3-492-02391-6. OCLC 4906282.
- with Guido Mangold (1984). Die Alpen Wildnis – Almrausch – Rummelplatz (in German). Hamburg: Gruner + Jahr. ISBN 978-3-570-02380-8. OCLC 165862170.
- Wir Neandertaler : der abenteuerliche Aufstieg des Menschengeschlechts (in German). Hamburg: Gruner + Jahr. 1988. ISBN 3-570-05998-7. OCLC 180610323.
- Der Kölner Dom : wie die Deutschen zu ihrem Weltwunder kamen (in German). Hamburg: Gruner + Jahr. 1991. ISBN 3-570-09259-3. OCLC 28399918.
- Mythos Titanic : das Protokoll der Katastrophe, drei Stunden, die die Welt erschütterten (in German). Hamburg: Gruner + Jahr. 1986. ISBN 3-570-05991-X. OCLC 15152258.
- Die Sieger: wodurch Genies, Phantasten und Verbrecher berühmt geworden sind. Gruner + Jahr, Hamburg 1992; Taschenbuchauflage: Piper-TB 2217, Munich / Zurich 1996, ISBN 3-492-22217-X.
- with Christoph Fasel (1995). Wie man die Welt rettet und sich dabei amüsiert (in German). Reinbek bei Hamburg: Rowohlt Verlag. ISBN 3-498-06294-8. OCLC 40330508.
- Am Puls des Planeten Expeditionen, Zeitreisen, Kulturgeschichten (in German). Hamburg: Hoffmann und Campe. 1999. ISBN 978-3-455-11280-1. OCLC 612156165.
- Grosse Verlierer : von Goliath bis Gorbatschow (in German). Reinbek bei Hamburg: Rowohlt Verlag. 2004. ISBN 3-498-06365-0. OCLC 55962864.
- Der Mensch eine Karriere (in German). Reinbek bei Hamburg: Rowohlt Verlag. 2008. ISBN 978-3-498-06405-1. OCLC 263414224.
- Die Wahrheit über die Lüge warum wir den Irrtum brauchen und die Lüge lieben (in German). Reinbek bei Hamburg: Rowohlt Verlag. 2012. ISBN 978-3-498-06418-1. OCLC 809980186.
- Der Soldat – Ein Nachruf : eine Weltgeschichte von Helden, Opfern und Bestien (in German). Reinbek bei Hamburg: Rowohlt Verlag. 2014. ISBN 978-3-498-06429-7. OCLC 877888692.
- Denkt endlich an die Enkel. Eine letzte Warnung, bevor alles zu spät ist. Rowohlt Verlag, Hamburg 2019. ISBN 978-3-498-00153-7

=== Autobiography ===
- Hottentottenstottertrottel. Mein langes, wunderliches Leben (in German). Reinbek bei Hamburg: Rowohlt Verlag. 2015. ISBN 978-3-498-06435-8.
