= Information Control Division =

US military office in occupied Germany

The Information Control Division (ICD) was a department of the Office of Military Government, United States (OMGUS) during the early part of the post-war American occupation of Germany beginning in 1945, following World War II.

== Mission ==
The ICD was focused on controlling and altering German media to promote democratic values and to move Germany away from Nazism. Formed on 12 May 1945 from the Psychological Warfare Division of SHAEF (PWD/SHAEF), the ICD was led by U.S. Army General Robert A. McClure, with a mission defined as:

To provide the Germans with information, which will influence them to understand and accept the United States programme of occupation, and to establish for themselves a stable, peaceful, and acceptable government. Such information will impress upon the Germans the totality of their military defeat, the impossibility of rearmament, the responsibility of the individual German for war and atrocities, the disastrous effects of the structure and system of National Socialism on Germany and the world — and the possibility that through work and cooperation Germany may again be accepted into the family of nations.

Its initial task was seizing control of the German media, removing figures with Nazi associations or histories and prohibiting overly nationalist or militarized content. It was charged with licensing the German newspapers, selecting editors who favored creating a democratic society, and pre-approving content before it was published - although from August 1945 the model switched to approval post-publication. Initially entirely independent of the military government of Germany, it was merged into OMGUS in February 1946.

As the Cold War became a priority in United States foreign policy, the ICD focused on using Germany as "the first battlefront of psychological warfare between the U.S. and the USSR", forcing licensed newspapers to publish content compatible with the direction of U.S. foreign policy and revoking the licenses of those that would not. The ICD faced some controversy over this shift in focus, along with its relationship with Hollywood and its handling of its Radio Control branch. The ICD relinquished central control over German mass media to the German people in 1949.

== Origin ==
Many within the Allied Forces of World War II − France, Soviet Union, United States, Britain, etc.− wanted to prevent any future signs of militaristic and cultural aggression from Germany. Britain and the U.S. specifically, with the agreement of Soviet and French Military governors, pursued a coordinated post-war peacetime effort that centered around the control of information and media dissemination in post-war Germany. Two months after the end of the World War II in Europe, the "Anglo American Psychological Warfare Division" and the "British Political Warfare Executive" were re-designated as Information Control Division in the American sector and the Information Services Division in the British zone of control.

The Information Control Division was part of a larger campaign on the part of the United States and Britain to facilitate peaceful post-war time relations and to reeducate the German people to rid them of Nazism under the Office of Military Government, United States. The United States wanted to influence the German psyche and address the issue of "hypernationalism" and Nazism that had developed in Germany. Through the use of propaganda and media control, the ICD was one of the key facets by which the United States pursued this campaign.

The inclination of a significant portion of Germany's population towards nationalism was first identified before Hitler took his reign during World War II. Saul Padover, political scientist and historian, describes the "German problem" as: "hostility to democracy (shared power), reliance on authoritarianism, respect for force and acceptance of military virtues, belief in German superiority, cultural or racial".

Padover was not alone in criticizing the developments of the "German problem", with many government officials sharing the same concern. British propaganda surrounding the image of the German people made its way into American media and influenced many American outlooks on the German people and ultimately helped solidify the United States' decision to deploy psychological warfare divisions within Germany following World War I. Many of these feelings towards Germany by academic and military personnel contributed to the British and American pursuit of psychological control and influence within American and British occupied sectors in post-war Germany.

== Activities ==
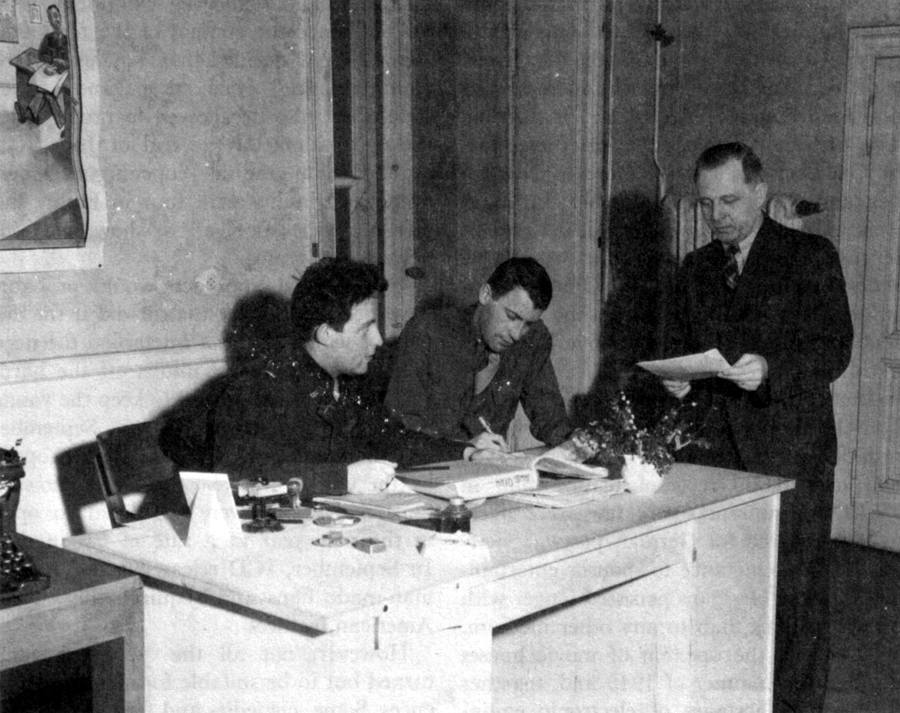
Author submits manuscript for ICD clearance

The main goal of the ICD was to place German media in the American-controlled territory of Germany under the control of the American military in order to influence its production under the American standard of democratic values. The ICD strived to accomplish this in three phases: the first phase was to shut down "all media of public expression in Germany", the second phase was to seize control of their public media operations, and the third phase sought to return the media of public expression to back German officials who, American officials believed, displayed sufficiently anti-Nazi, democratic ideals.

The ICD consisted of two divisions that facilitated: the surveil of staff work and the surveil of the operations of the division. Those within the staff division recruited necessary staff, drafted up ICD policies and strategies, sent out operational instructions and important information for other divisions within ICD, and gathered on the ground information. The operations division carried out the instructions and strategies of the staff work division to influence media within post-war Germany. The four media groups that the ICD controlled in post-war Germany were:

- Press
- Publications
- Radio
- Film, theater, and music

Institutions such as publishers, libraries, radio outlets, etc. within the four categories were privy to ICD regulation based on the U.S. occupied sector in Germany they were in and each of the four media groups had corresponding control branches that oversaw the production of their respective media. The Press Control branch created regulations and policy for the operations within German newspaper organizations and controlled which publishing organizations associated with Germany's newspaper industry. One notable newspaper published by the ICD during the American occupation was Die Neue Zeitung.

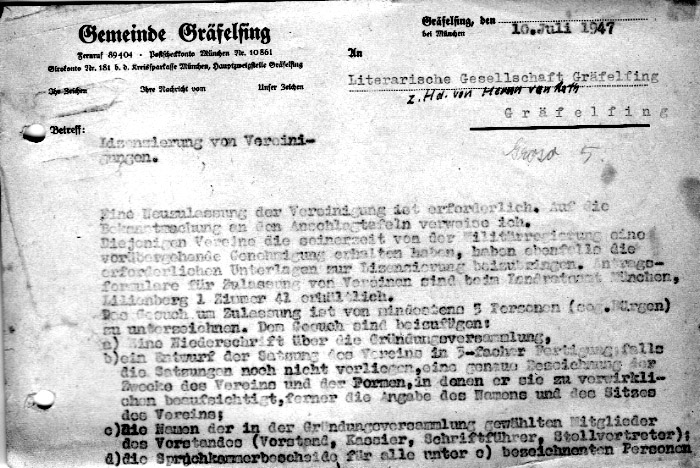
Official request for starting the Allied re-education process of a cultural society.

The Publications Control branch concerned regulation of the production of books and magazines and drafted policy around what kind of literary works were appropriate for publishing. The ICD believed that books were one of the most influential forms of media for the German people and would be emphasized as one of the main ways in which the ICD would reinforce their reeducation ideals. The Publications branch controlled 500 publishers that would produce acceptable reeducation material for the German public. The first literary journals to be published under the monitoring of the ICD was Die Wandlung. Another important journal published under the monitoring of the ICD was Horizont, a literary piece meant to educate German youth and deemphasize German's militaristic past.

The Radio Control branch supervised what kind of media and messaging was broadcast over the radio. The United States controlled five radio outlets in Stuttgart, Frankfurt, Munich, Bremen, and Berlin. The ICD emphasized that there needed to be minimal German governmental influence over what was broadcast over the radio as this was what contributed to Nazi propaganda and influence during the war. Additionally, the ICD Radio Control branch was charged with preventing information monopolies and subsidies from the German government in radio media. The first radio outlet under complete ICD control was Radio Stuttgart.

ICD's radio broadcasting of the Nuremberg trials followed specific requirements – like all content that came out of the radio broadcasting branch – that focused on framing military policies in the way they thought would be best for the demilitarization and reeducation of the German people. The ICD encouraged radio stations to broadcast different perspectives and opinions from German civilians on their station so as to stray further away from the monopoly that the German government had in radio broadcasting during the war. Before the official affordance of mass media control to the German people in 1949, radio stations under ICD control, like Radio Stuttgart, broadcast content that promoted American culture and music.

Lastly, the Film, Theater, and Music control branch determined which films and other media productions were allowed to be played in Germany. Through film licensing hand-outs for German producers, and through the screenings of potential American films to be broadcast, the ICD selectively chose what kind of films, music, and theater productions the German public in the U.S. occupied sector would consume. After the war, all theaters and film-viewing institutions were ordered to be shut down and many of the film studios were converted into storage spaces. The law regarding this shutdown was amended in 1945, but in the absence of the German film content and German dominance within their film industry, American films and media were shipped in and broadcast with content that emphasized democratic values and ideals for the stated purpose of reeducating the German public. Many of the films from American film industries that were banned were ones that touched on specific political topics and representations that reflected the recent events of World War II. The ICD brought in American civilians with experience in the American film industry to help the reeducation process on this front.

In late 1946, there was a considerable uptick in the amount of criticism of American-occupied Germany polices coming from the Soviet-occupied territory of Germany through their Soviet-controlled press. Shortly after, in response to this criticism, the ICD launched a covert campaign to produce anti-communist propaganda in the U.S. zone to fight the charges produced by Soviet propaganda. One of the most important ways they broadcast this propaganda was through the radio control branch.

The ICD and many other military activities in the American-occupied Germany shifted from anti-Nazism and anti-fascism messaging to anti-communist propaganda – to the disapproval of a number of ICD employees. In 1947, the ICD led Radio Stuttgart hosted a talk series called "The America View", wherein the host would explicitly call on listeners to denounce communism, labeling it as a "threat". This new direction, and the beginning of tense relations between the United States and the Soviet Union, also caused many ICD employees to fall under scrutiny of having communist or Marxian ties.

U.S. Occupied Zones in Germany 1948

== Locations ==
After World War II, the post-war Yalta Conference declared that Germany would be split into four occupational zones occupied, respectively, by the United States, Britain, France, and the Soviet Union. The American-occupied sector in Germany "encompassed Bavaria, Hesse, Württemberg-Baden (now Baden-Württemberg), the Bremen enclave, and the U.S Sector of Berlin". Each of these occupied zones held offices wherein the ICD would handle the administrative tasks to help the United States exert influence over German media through the different control branches of the ICD. ICD main headquarters were located in Berlin.

== Personnel ==
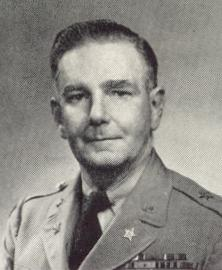
Robert A. McClure 1957

The Information Control Division employed many former Psychological Warfare Division personnel and was under the command of General McClure. General McClure had extensive experience in psychological warfare during World War II, working as Chief of the Information and Censorship section of the Allied Force Headquarters in 1942 and Head of the Psychological Warfare Division in 1944. General McClure assigned William S. Paley to Deputy Chief of the Information Control Division. William S. Paley was popular for his role as president and Chair of Columbia Broadcast System. McClure also assigned Billy Wilder as Officer, a renowned figure in the film industry, who helped outline suggestions for Germany's post-war film industry. Along with these high-profile figures, McClure also hired individuals from academia who occupied important leadership roles in Germany's U.S. occupied territories. One of these academic figures was Douglas Waples, a professor at the University of Chicago who assisted in the activities of the Publications Control Branch in Berlin. Another influential figure was ICD Chief and Director General Gordon Textor. McClure also assigned Alfred Toombs as head of ICD's Intelligence Branch. ICD was a mixture of civilian personnel such as Paley, Wilder, etc. and military personnel that had come from the former Psychological Warfare Division. Additionally, the ICD employed prisoners of war and refugees who had previously worked for the Psychological Warfare Division, to help with ICD operational activities in their occupied zones.

== Critiques ==
The insertion of American films into the German film industry and presence of Hollywood filmmakers within ICD personnel was cited as problematic for some ICD critics. Author Robert R. Shandley states that there is an inherent conflict of interest in Hollywood's input and presence within the handling and control of German media. Shandley argues that Hollywood was gearing up to take over foreign film markets under the guise of assisting in the "reeducation" of post-war Germany. Many have also critiqued the large American replacement of German media, especially in the German film industry, for its erasure of German voices and perspectives for their own reconciliation with their history.

Along with those who critiqued the film industry, there were heated debates about the way in which the ICD would handle radio broadcasting in Germany. Many believed that a pillar of democracy was free speech, and a free radio system, one that was run by the German people for commercial interests, was necessary in the pursuit of that pillar. ICD and OMGUS officials agreed with this reasoning but they also stated that they "would not approve any organizational plan which by reason of either ownership or corporate system contravenes the instructions for establishment of free and independent organization”. Additionally, IDC Chief Gordon Textor stated that there was an “insufficient number of stations to permit free competition among" potential private radio stations in Germany. At the time, these comments were met with criticism in the United States, with many arguing that private stations would contribute to German democratic values and capitalistic interests.

By 1947, there were considerable changes to the ideological direction of the ICD. The ICD still functioned under their original intent to democratize and reeducate the German population under American standards, but they pursued the output of new anti-communist and anti soviet propaganda in an effort to combat the attacks on United States German occupation policies coming from Soviet-controlled German territories. The usage of ICD resources and personnel to facilitate the production of this material was not an approach that all members of the ICD agreed on. For example, Field Hornie, Chief of ICD Radio Control Branch in Munich and two colleagues resigned based on these new policies. Hornie and colleagues did not agree with the argument that the establishment of an anti-communist agenda and the refutation of the charges made my Soviet-occupied Germany was necessary to achieve their original goal of Nazism rejection and reeducation.

== Discontinuation ==
The goal of the third phase of the ICD was to fully return mass media and communications to the German people through a careful licensing process wherein the ICD would grant publishing and media creation licenses, without a pre-publication or post-publication process, to individuals that would produce content that embodied values consistent with anti-Nazism and democratic values. In the beginning of this phase, the content created by those given a license were still subjected to pre-publication screenings to make sure the content followed ICD guidelines. After this stage, those licensed would be subjected to post-publishing scrutiny by the ICD, with publishers still facing the possibility of their licenses being revoked if they deferred from ICD guidelines. The final stage of this process was the removal of all restrictions and scrutiny by American forces and the rendering of complete media control to German civilians. The ICD maintained specific criteria for who they would grant licenses for content creation. The ICD only granted media licenses to German individuals and did not allow licenses to be distributed to corporations. Control of German media was officially handed over to the Germans in 1949 and the need for most of ICD the facilities and its operations lessened.

== See also ==
- Democratization
- Denazification
- Office of Strategic Services
- Psychological warfare
- Reconstruction of Germany
