= Marcel Fodor =

American journalist (1890–1977)

- Marcel Fodor in the late 1930s
- Born: Marcel Vilmos (Mike William) Fodor; 17 January 1890; Budapest, Hungary
- Died: 1 July 1977 (aged 87); Trostberg, West Germany
- Occupations: Writer, editor

Marcel W. "Mike" Fodor (17 January 1890 in Budapest, Hungary - 1 July 1977 in Trostberg, Germany; often cited as M. W. Fodor), was a foreign correspondent for several British and American newspapers in Vienna during the years between the world wars, editor of the Berlin edition of Die Neue Zeitung and correspondent for Voice of America in Europe after World War II, and an author who specialized in the Balkans and Central Europe.

== Early life and education ==
Fodor was born as Marcel Vilmos (Mike William) Fodor in Budapest in 1890. His father, Janos Fodor, was a Danube Swabian whose family name "Fischer" had been translated into the Hungarian language as "Fodor" during the Magyarization movement of the late 1800s. Janos was a wealthy industrialist who owned newspapers in Vienna and Budapest. Fodor's mother, Berta Auspitz, was a member of a wealthy family of bankers and industrialists in Central Europe. His family had Jewish roots and was described as assimilated.

Fodor studied in Budapest and Charlottenburg, receiving a degree in chemical engineering in 1911. At the outbreak of World War I Fodor, a firm pacifist, immigrated to Great Britain, where he worked as a chemical engineer. However, he was soon interned as an enemy alien. At the conclusion of the War, Fodor returned to Budapest. In the revolutions that shook Hungary immediately after World War I, Fodor's parents were named as "class enemies" by the new communist regime and killed. In the turbulent years of war and revolution, their fortune was lost as well.

== Early journalism ==
In Budapest, Fodor met and befriended journalist Dorothy Thompson. Fodor himself soon made the transition from chemical engineer to journalist, becoming the Vienna correspondent for the Manchester Guardian. Time described how and why Fodor's major career transition happened:

An engineer, fluent in five languages, [Fodor] had been grumbling along as manager of a steel mill in the English Midlands. Postwar retrenchment shut the mill, freed Fodor. The Manchester Guardian liked his occasional letters from Middle Europe, asked for cables, soon hired the shy, whip-smart, "relentlessly honest" little man as a fulltime correspondent. Thereby the Guardian conferred a major boon on U.S. foreign correspondence.

== Interwar years in Central Europe ==
In the 1920s and the 1930s, Fodor worked as a journalist in Central Europe, posting stories with the Guardian; several major newspapers in the United States; and magazines such as The Nation, The New Republic and American Mercury.

In 1922, Fodor married Marie Martha Roob, born in Miskolc, Hungary. Their son Denis was born in the mid 1920s.

Covering the interwar turmoil in Central Europe, Fodor was a friend or mentor to several renowned journalists who covered the same beat, including Dorothy Thompson, John Gunther, Frances Gunther, William Shirer, George Eric Rowe Gedye, H. R. Knickerbocker, Edgar Mowrer, Frederick Scheu, Robert Best and others who frequented the Stammtisch at the Café Louvre, the unofficial headquarters of foreign journalism in interwar Vienna. Best and Fodor presided at the Stammtisch, where journalists and regular visitors discussed the days news and exchanged information. J. William Fulbright, who met Fodor and other correspondents at the Café Louvre, described a typical day:

The correspondents would sit around there in the Cafe Louvre, 10 and 11 o'clock at night and old Fodor would tell them what had happened that day. They'd talk to Fodor for over an hour, and they'd all write it down and then send it off to the telegraph office across the street. I remember people would come in there from The New York Times and other papers, big papers in the U.S. and have a long conversation with Fodor. About two weeks later I'd read it all in The New York Times Magazine.

Fulbright, who later served as US senator for Arkansas for 30 years and established the US foreign exchange program that bears his name, first met Fodor in Vienna. In spring 1929, Fulbright, who had just finished his studies at Oxford as a Rhodes Scholar, joined Fodor on a factfinding trip across several Balkan countries and Greece. Fodor arranged press credentials for Fulbright, and both interviewed diplomats and government leaders across the region.

That sort of mentoring relationship was common for Fodor:

Fodor related well to younger people, particularly Americans. When he and John Gunther met in 1930, they developed the same kind of student-teacher relationship the Fodor had engaged in with Thompson and Fulbright. It was said the Fodor taught more young foreign correspondents the business than any man alive.

—

Because of the relationships Fodor developed; his fluency in several languages spoken in Central Europe; and his encyclopedic knowledge of history, politics and personalities of the region, Fodor had a strong reputation among his fellow journalists:

Marcel W. Fodor's journalist colleagues typically used superlatives when describing him. For example, John Gunther, who worked closely with him in Vienna during the early 1930s, wrote that "he has the most acutely comprehensive knowledge of Central Europe of any journalist I know." According to George Seldes, Fodor was "one of the best journalists in the world." Even one of America's most famed journalists, Edward R. Murrow, called Fodor "one of the greatest reporters I have ever known."

—

In 1934, Fodor and Gunther interviewed Adolf Hitler's poor relatives in Hitler's Austrian hometown of Braunau, the first journalists to cover Hitler's birthplace, origin, acquaintances and relatives. Their coverage clearly showed Hitler's humble beginnings and family, in stark contrast to the official Nazi propaganda about his origins. For that reason, Gunther and Fodor were soon placed on a Gestapo "death list" and remained in continual danger as the Nazis moved across Europe.

In the tense months leading up to World War II, Fodor and his family narrowly escaped Vienna in March 1938, Czechoslovakia in September 1938 and finally Belgium and France in May and June 1940 as Axis forces moved forward across Europe.

== World War II and afterward ==
Marcel Fodor in the early 1940s

From 1940 to 1944, Fodor lived in the United States, working as a professor at the Illinois Institute of Technology and as a columnist with the Chicago Sun. Fodor was also active on the lecture circuit, giving speeches across the United States during World War II. In 1943, Fodor became a US citizen.

After the war, Fodor resumed his journalistic career in Central Europe. Soon he was hired as Berlin Editor of Die Neue Zeitung, a newspaper funded by the US military in postwar Germany.

From 1948 to 1957, Fodor regularly corresponded with Fulbright, now US Senator from Arkansas. Fodor sent Fulbright dozens of memos with summaries and his views of the situation in Europe and the Soviet Union.

After Die Neue Zeitung closed in 1955, Fodor worked for Voice of America as policy director and program evaluator. Fodor retired from Voice of America in 1965.

== Death and legacy ==
He died in Trostberg, West Germany, in 1977.

Fodor's obituary in the New York Times, "M. W. Fodor is dead at 87, a famed correspondent", reads in part:

M. W. Fodor, a well-known American foreign correspondent of the 1920s to 1940s who specialized in reporting on the Balkans and Central Europe, died Friday at the age of 87.... Although Mr. Fodor was an authority on the Balkans and Central Europe, his knowledge of all Europe was vast. In his old age he could on request name the deputy police chief in Vienna at the time of the Nazi assassination of Chancellor Engelbert Dollfuss in 1934.... Mr. Fodor, born in Hungary, could speak Hungarian, English, German, French, and Italian fluently....

== Works ==
=== Books ===
- Plot and Counterplot in Central Europe. Houghton Mifflin, 1937. Given an expanded and revised edition in 1939 as South of Hitler.
- The Revolution is On. Houghton Mifflin Co., 1940.
- The Russian Riddle. Chicago Sun Syndicate, 1942. A compilation of Fodor's columns written for the Chicago Sun.
- VOA History: 1942 to 1967. Manuscript, 1967.

A complete list of books and magazine articles along with a selected list of newspaper articles by Fodor is included in Biographical Sketch: Marcel W. Fodor, Foreign Correspondent by Dan Durning.
