= Will Grohmann =

German art critic and art historian

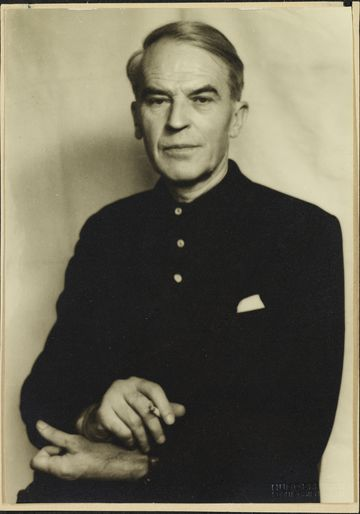
- Born: 4 December 1887; Bautzen, German Empire
- Died: 6 May 1968 (aged 80); West Berlin, West Germany
- Occupations: Art critic and historian

Will Grohmann (born 4 December 1887 in Bautzen; died 6 May 1968 in Berlin) was a German art critic and art historian specialized in German Expressionism and abstract art. He was known as the "godfather of modernism".

== Life and work ==
From 1908 to 1913 Grohmann studied oriental languages with special emphasis on Sanskrit at the universities of Paris and Leipzig. Though he wrote his PhD thesis in Germanic literature, entitled Vers oder Prosa im hohen Drama des achtzehnten Jahrhunderts (1914), and taught languages at school, where Erich Kästner was one of his pupils, he devoted his life to art research and publishing. He was interested in the painters of Die Brücke and supported the Bauhaus. After the First World War, he wrote many entries for the Thieme-Becker and articles for the periodical Der Cicerone. He also published books on his friend, Ernst Ludwig Kirchner. He was also a friend of Karl Schmidt-Rottluff, Otto Dix, Paul Klee, Wassily Kandinsky and Oskar Schlemmer.

From 1926 to 1933 Grohmann worked at the Staatliche Gemäldegalerie, Dresden. In 1933 he was dismissed by the Nazis because he had an all too positive view of modern art. However, he continued publishing articles for newspapers under the pseudonym of Olaf Rydberg. During the Second World War, he researched the safer fields of archaeology and the art of migratory people.

From 1945 to 1947 he was professor and rector at the Hochschule für Werkkunst, Leipzig. In 1947 he moved to West Berlin because of political differences, becoming a professor at the Academy of Arts, Berlin in 1948. Until his death, he continued championing abstract artists, including such post-war artists as Willi Baumeister, Rupprecht Geiger, Theodor Werner and Fritz Winter.

Grohmann published over 500 essays on more than 150 artists, among them Edvard Munch, Ernst Barlach, Henri Matisse, Pablo Picasso and Joan Miró, and about 1,300 newspaper articles, not to mention his many catalogue forewords. In the 1950s and 60s, he was also one of the most influential German art critics to appear on radio and television. Furthermore, he was engaged in curating important exhibitions and "played a significant role in drawing international attention to the avant-garde".

== Select publications ==
- The Drawings of Paul Klee. New York: C. Valentin, 1944
- The Intimate Sketchbooks of Georges Braque. Paris: Verve, A. Zwemmer, 1955
- Karl Schmidt-Rottluff. Stuttgart: W. Kohlhammer, 1956
- Art Since 1945. New York: H. N. Abrams, 1958
- Wassily Kandinsky: Life and Work. New York: H. N. Abrams, 1958
- Ernst Ludwig Kirchner. Stuttgart: W. Kohlhammer 1958
- Braque. Greenwich, CN: New York Graphic Society, 1962
- Oskar Schlemmer: Zeichnungen und Graphik. Oeuvrekatalog. Stuttgart: Hatje, 1965
- Willi Baumeister: Life and Work. New York: H. N. Abrams 1966
- Wassily Kandinsky: Eine Begegnung aus dem Jahre 1924. Berlin: Friedenauer Presse, 1966
- Paul Klee. New York: H.N. Abrams 1967
