= Robert A. McClure =

United States Army general

Robert Alexis McClure
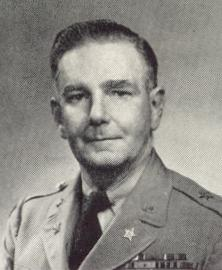
- McClure as a Brigadier General
- Born: March 4, 1897; Mattoon, Illinois, U.S.
- Died: January 1, 1957 (aged 59); Fort Huachuca, Arizona, U.S.
- Burial place: Fairmount Cemetery, Madison, Indiana
- Alma mater: Kentucky Military Institute
- Spouse: Marjory Crandal Leitch (m. 1918)
- Children: 2
- Military career
- Allegiance: United States of America
- Branch: Philippine Constabulary; United States Army
- Service years: 1916-1917 (Philippine Constabulary); 1917-1956 (U.S. Army)
- Rank: Major General
- Commands: Information and Censorship Section, Allied Force Headquarters; Psychological Warfare Division, SHAEF; Information Control Division, U.S. Forces, European Theater; Office of the Chief of Psychological Warfare; Military Assistance Advisory Group, Iran
- Conflicts: World War I World War II; Korean War; Cold War
- Awards: Distinguished Service Medal (2); Legion of Merit (2); Bronze Star Medal

Robert Alexis McClure (March 4, 1897 – January 1, 1957) was a United States Army major general, psychological warfare specialist, and military government officer. He is recognized in U.S. Army and Army Special Operations historical material as the “Father of U.S. Army Special Warfare” for his role in rebuilding Army psychological warfare after World War II, establishing the Psychological Warfare Center at Fort Bragg, North Carolina, and promoting the activation of the 10th Special Forces Group.

During World War II, McClure served as chief of the Information and Censorship Section at Allied Force Headquarters and later as chief of the Psychological Warfare Division at Supreme Headquarters Allied Expeditionary Force. After the war, he led information-control and reorientation work in occupied Germany and continued related work through the Army Civil Affairs Division. During the Korean War, he headed the Office of the Chief of Psychological Warfare, where he helped organize psychological warfare units, training, doctrine, and special operations capabilities that became central to the institutional development of U.S. Army Special Warfare.

== Early life ==
Robert McClure was born on March 4, 1897, in Mattoon, Illinois, to George H. McClure and Hattie J. Rudy. He was the eldest child, with two younger sisters, Persis Elizabeth and Mary Susan. He also had a half-brother William Eckert, who served as a Lieutenant General in the United States Air Force and later became the fourth commissioner of Major League Baseball. After his parents' 1907 divorce, McClure's mother moved the family to Madison, Indiana, where she married Frank Eckert.

McClure at the Kentucky Military Institute, December 1912.

McClure grew up on a farm a short distance from the Kentucky border with Indiana. He attended school in Madison until transferring to the Kentucky Military Institute in Lyndon, Kentucky, from which he graduated in 1915.

== World War I ==
After his graduation, McClure joined the Philippine Constabulary in August 1916 as a 3rd Lieutenant. The Philippine Constabulary was a militarized Filipino police force established by the U.S. Army after the Spanish-American War in 1898. Led by U.S. officers, its mission was to conduct counterinsurgency operations. During his service in the counter-insurgency force, McClure accepted a commission as an Infantry 1st Lieutenant in the United States Army on August 9, 1917, four months after the American entry into World War I. His first assignment was with the 31st Infantry Regiment based out of Fort William McKinley, Philippine Islands. McClure subsequently served in Tianjin, Republic of China, as part of the 15th Infantry Regiment in 1918. The unit was responsible for securing rail access between the port of Qinhuangdao, Tianjin and Tongzhou.

== Interwar years ==
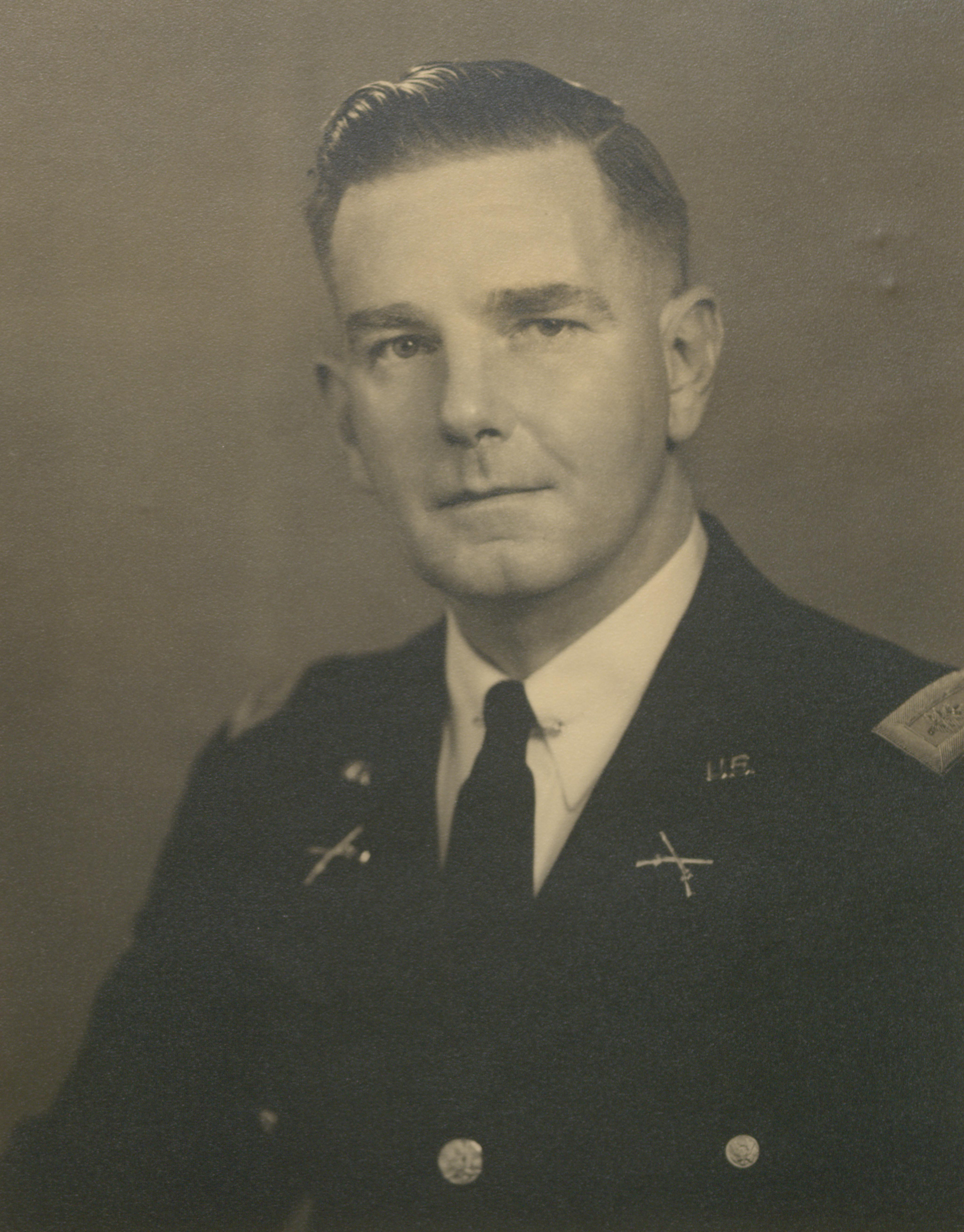
McClure as Executive Officer, The Army War College c. 1940

In 1920 following the WWI draw-down, Captain McClure briefly returned to the Philippine Islands, stationed in Manila with the 27th Infantry Regiment. With the continuing draw-down and realignment of forces, McClure received reassignment.

Upon his return to the United States in 1920, McClure was assigned to the 19th Infantry Regiment located at Camp Sherman, Ohio, where he served as the post exchange officer. Being an Army officer that relished working in an operational context, McClure reportedly despised this assignment.

McClure received orders in 1922 to Fort Benning, GA, where he served as an Infantry instructor assigned to the 29th Infantry Regiment. McClure's capability as an expert horseman proved an asset to the Infantry School, and for a time he was an instructor for horsemanship at Fort Benning, leading the military base in several wins in Georgia horse show competitions.

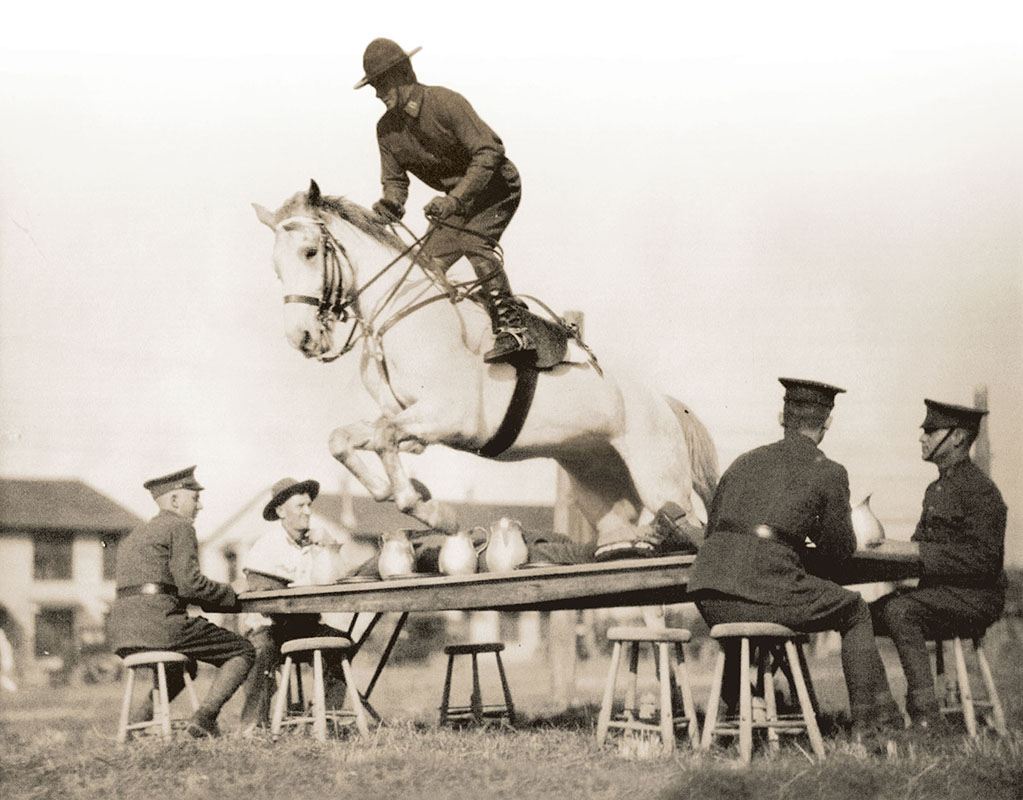
Captain McClure demonstrating his equestrian skills over a table of dining Army officers Fort Benning, GA 1928

While serving in the 29th, Captain McClure became the commander of the regimental headquarters company, which he described to his hometown newspaper as "the most desirable assignment I have had."

In between leadership assignments, McClure graduated from the U.S. Army's Infantry School in 1925 and the Cavalry School's Troop Officers Course in Fort Riley, Kansas, in June 1926. Major General Robert H. Allen, Chief of Infantry recognized Captain McClure's graduation from the Cavalry School as an infantry officer stating, "It is of real importance to the Infantry, and to the service."

McClure graduated the Command and General Staff School at Fort Leavenworth, Kansas, in 1932, and subsequently taught as a professor of Military Science and Tactics at Riverside Military Academy in Gainesville, Georgia. In 1936, Captain McClure was selected to attend the Army War College located in Washington, D.C. Post graduation, Lieutenant Colonel McClure taught at the Infantry School and War College in addition to serving as the executive officer under General John Dewitt and General Phillip Peyton at the War College. In July 1940, he was assigned to G-1 of the Fourth Army, headquartered at the Presidio of San Francisco, California.

== World War II ==
When the United States declared war on the Empire of Japan on December 8, 1941, McClure was serving as military attaché to the American embassy in London. He was later given the additional duty of military attaché liaison to all of the European governments in exile in 1942. With these additional responsibilities, promotions came quickly: he became a brigadier general in March 1942, only nineteen months after his promotion to lieutenant colonel in August 1940.

Later that same year, McClure was appointed by Lieutenant General Dwight D. Eisenhower ("Ike") to chief of intelligence for the European theater of operations. In preparation for Operation TORCH, Eisenhower next tapped McClure to head the creation of a new organization. U.S. psychological warfare capabilities had been mothballed following the closure of WWI. The PSYWAR framework Colonel Heber Blankenhorn and his team built to fight the Central Powers in the Great War, had been nearly forgotten through attrition and atrophy following the post-WWI drawdown. The entity, known as the Allied Forces Information and Censorship Section (INC) was the foundation on which the U.S. psychological warfare capabilities in WWII were built. Writing to his wife Marjory in December 1942 from "somewhere in Africa," McClure stated:

My new job for which I was called by Ike very hurriedly is a continual headache ... I have what I call the INC Section ... I am just creating it.

Brigadier General McClure was given the task of consolidating several military functions into a cohesive unit: public relations, censorship and psychological warfare; with, in McClure's own words "a slop over into civil affairs" included. The INC included an amalgamation of military and civilian personnel from the U.S. Office of War Information (OWI); the Office of Strategic Services (OSS); the British Political Warfare Executive (PWE); and the U.S. Army.

McClure led the Information and Censorship Section until November 1943, when Eisenhower made him chief of the Publicity and Psychological Warfare Division. In February 1944, that organization became the G-6 staff directorate. On April 13, 1944, Eisenhower divided G-6 into separate publicity and psychological warfare divisions; Brigadier General Thomas J. Davis headed publicity, while McClure became chief of the Psychological Warfare Division, SHAEF. In that role, McClure coordinated propaganda with the U.S. Office of War Information, the Office of Strategic Services, the British Ministry of Information, and the Political Warfare Executive.

Under McClure, PWD/SHAEF coordinated large-scale leaflet, radio, and loudspeaker operations in support of Allied operations in Western Europe. ARSOF History states that PWD coordinated the airdrop of more than three billion leaflets from June 1944 to May 1945, while mobile radio broadcasting companies and broadcasting detachments supported advancing Allied units.

After the end of combat in Europe, McClure shifted from psychological warfare to occupation information control. When SHAEF ceased to exist in July 1945, he became chief of the Information Control Division, U.S. Forces, European Theater. The division controlled or supervised German newspapers, radio stations, theaters, films, publishers, libraries, and other public media as part of denazification and reorientation policy.

== Cold War ==
After the outbreak of the Korean War, McClure was recalled to Washington to help rebuild the Army’s psychological warfare capability. On January 15, 1951, the Army formally established the Office of the Chief of Psychological Warfare, with McClure as its head. The office was responsible for developing psychological warfare and special operations plans for the Army and supervising Army programs in those fields. McClure organized the office into Psychological Warfare, Requirements, and Special Operations divisions, the last of which became central to the creation of the Army’s first formal unconventional-warfare capability: Special Forces.

McClure moved quickly to create and field psychological warfare units. By spring 1951, the Army had activated the 1st Loudspeaker and Leaflet Company, 2nd Loudspeaker and Leaflet Company, 5th Loudspeaker and Leaflet Company, and 1st Radio Broadcasting and Leaflet Group, and had federalized the 301st Radio Broadcasting and Leaflet Group, a Reserve unit from New York. He also established psychological warfare instruction at the Army General School at Fort Riley, where the first psychological warfare officers course graduated in June 1951.

McClure’s most durable institutional achievement was the establishment of the Psychological Warfare Center at Fort Bragg in May 1952. The center originally consisted of the Psychological Warfare School, the 6th Radio Broadcasting and Leaflet Group, the Psychological Warfare Board, and the 10th Special Forces Group. Its mission included training, doctrine development, equipment testing, and support to both Psychological Warfare and Special Forces operations.

In March 1953, McClure was appointed Chief of the Military Assistance Advisory Group, Iran. He served there during the 1953 Iranian coup d’état.. Declassified U.S. diplomatic records show that on August 16, 1953, he conferred with Iranian Army Chief of Staff Taqi Riahi over reports of a coup and the Shah’s decree. On September 6, 1953, McClure reported to Army Chief of Staff Matthew Ridgway on discussions with the Shah about Iranian military organization and requirements.

McClure retired from the Army in 1956 and died of a heart attack soon after at Fort Huachuca, Arizona.

== Recognition and legacy ==
McClure is recognized in U.S. Army and Army Special Operations historical material as the “Father of U.S. Army Special Warfare.” Army historical material links that reputation to his Korean War-era role as Chief of Psychological Warfare for the Army, his establishment of the Psychological Warfare Center at Fort Bragg, and his support for the activation of the 10th Special Forces Group, the Army’s first unit organized for unconventional warfare.

On January 19, 2001, the U.S. Army Special Operations Command headquarters building at Fort Bragg, North Carolina, was dedicated in his honor. In 2010, McClure was inducted into the U.S. Special Operations Command Commando Hall of Honor. In 2013, he was inducted into the Psychological Operations Regiment as a Distinguished Member of the Regiment.

The Psychological Operations Regiment also presents the Major General Robert A. McClure Medallion Award in his honor. The award has Bronze, Silver, and Gold tiers and recognizes individuals for significant contributions to the Psychological Operations Regiment.

== Decorations ==
During his 39 years of military service to the United States, Major General McClure received a number of military awards, including some foreign decorations.

Here is his ribbon bar:

1st Row	Army Distinguished Service Medal with Oak Leaf Cluster		Legion of Merit with Oak Leaf Cluster	Bronze Star Medal
2nd Row	World War I Victory Medal	American Defense Service Medal with Foreign Service Clasp	American Campaign Medal	European-African-Middle Eastern Campaign Medal with 3 Service Stars
3rd Row	World War II Victory Medal	Army of Occupation Medal with Germany Clasp	National Defense Service Medal	Order of the British Empire, Commander
4th Row	Legion of Honor, Officer (France)	Croix de guerre 1939–1945, with Palm (France)	Order of the Crown, Officer (Belgium)	Order of Leopold II, Commander (Belgium)
5th Row	Order of the Crown of Italy, Grand Officer	Order of Glory, Knight of First Class (Tunisia)	Order of Ouissam Alaouite, Knight (Morocco)	Order of the Brilliant Star, 2nd Class with Rosette (China)
6th Row	Military Order of Merit, (Iran)	Polonia Restituta, Officer (Poland)	Order of the Lion and the Sun, Grand Officer (Iran)	Order of the Crown, Grand Officer (Iran)
