= Friedrich Luft =

German theatre critic

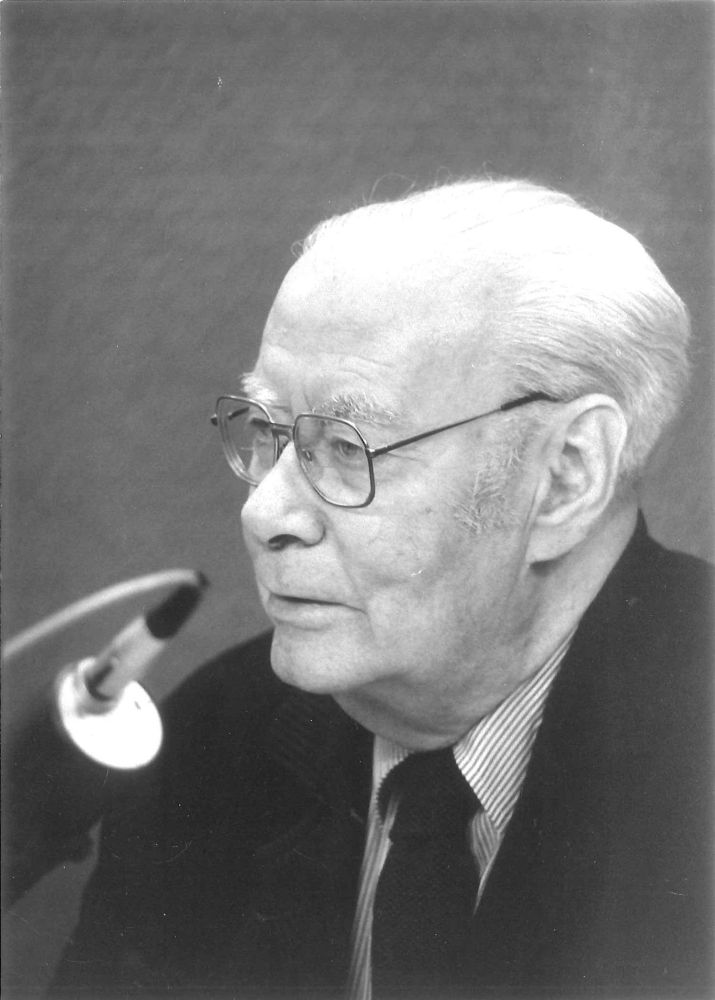
Friedrich Luft, end of the 1980s

Friedrich Luft (German: [lʊft]; 24 August 1911 – 24 December 1990) was a German feuilletonist and theater critic.

== Life ==
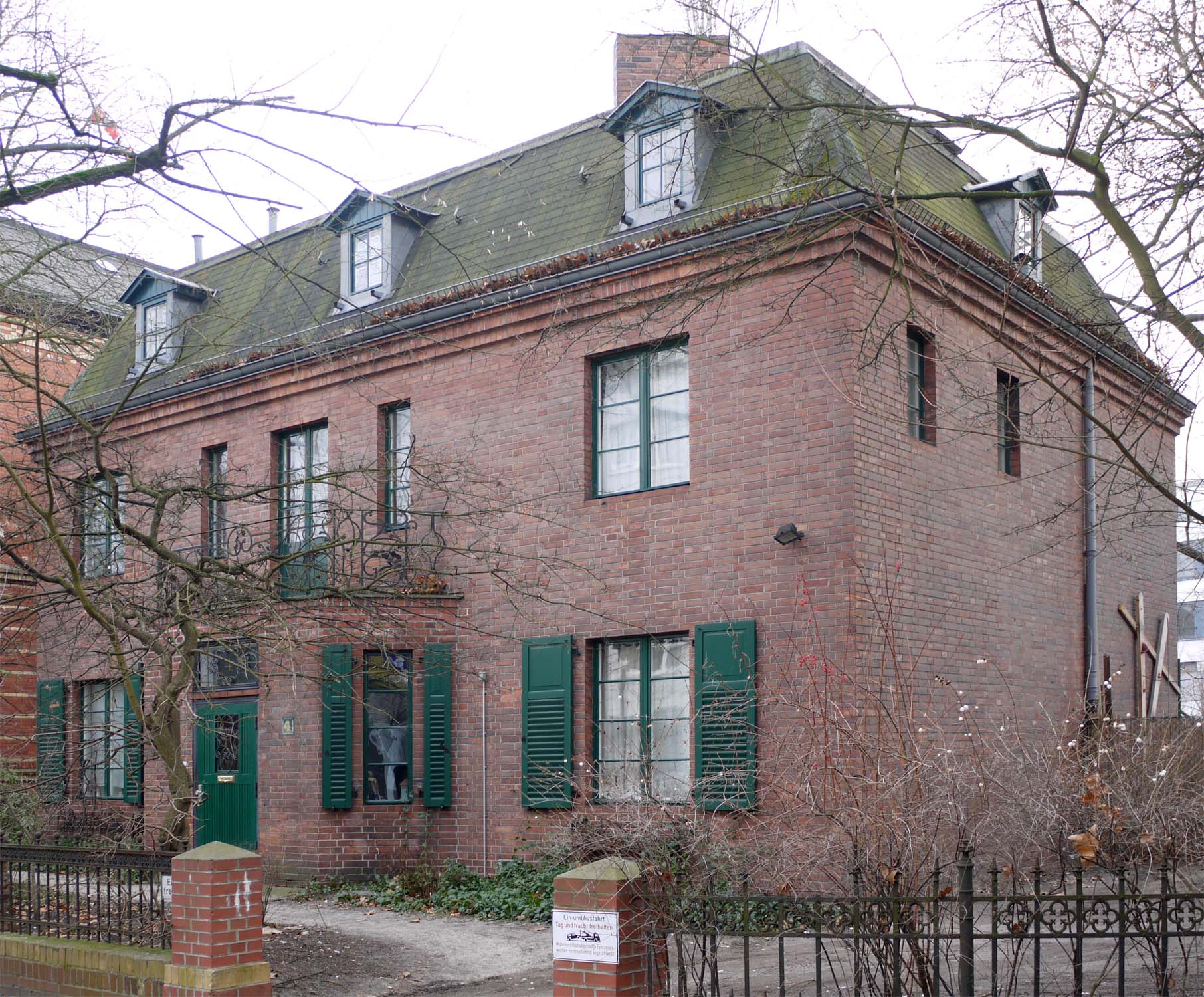
Residence of Friedrich Luft in Maienstraße- 4 in Schöneberg (52.500679°N 13.352016°E)

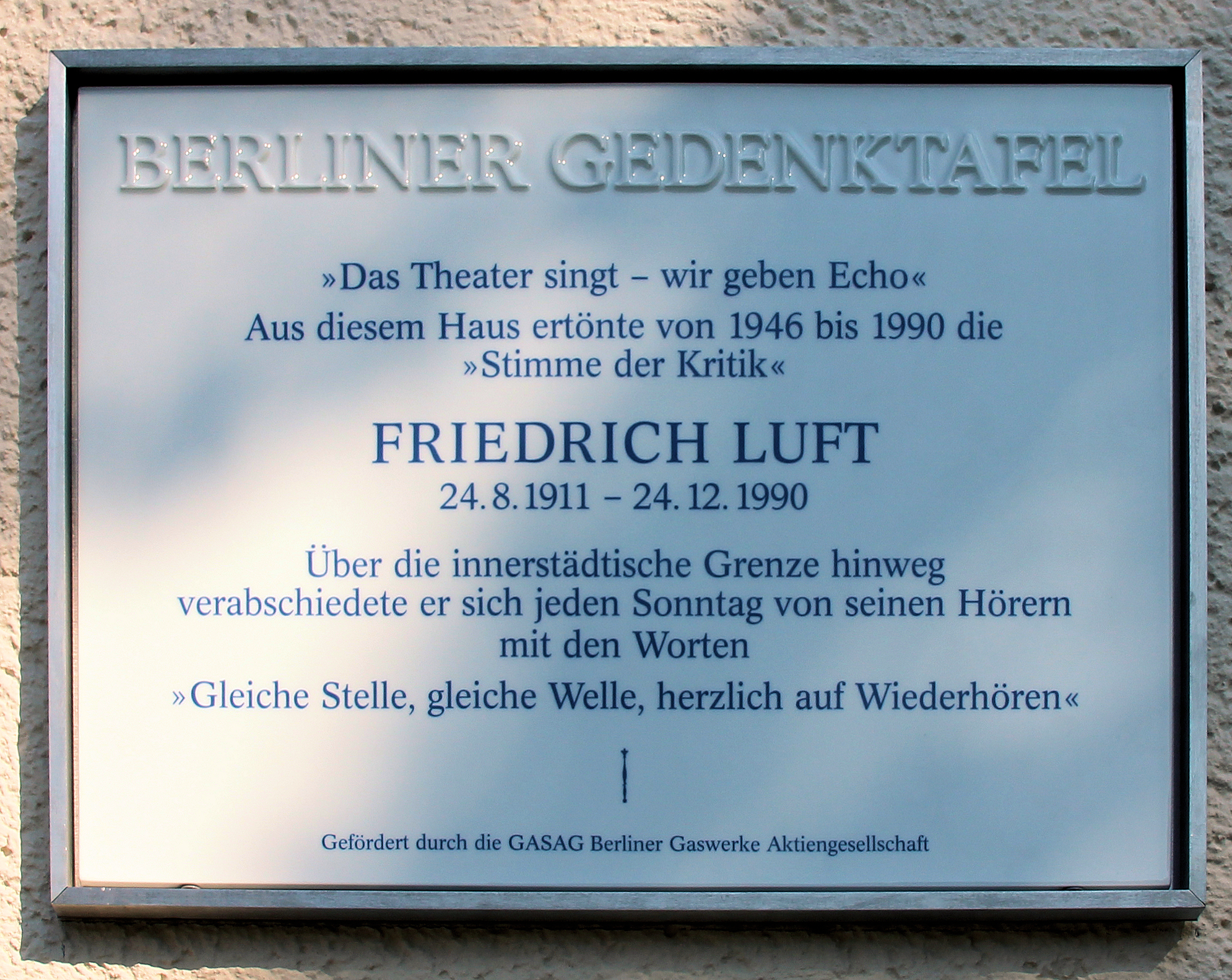
Berlin memorial plaque at the former Funkhaus am Hans-Rosenthal-Platz in Schöneberg

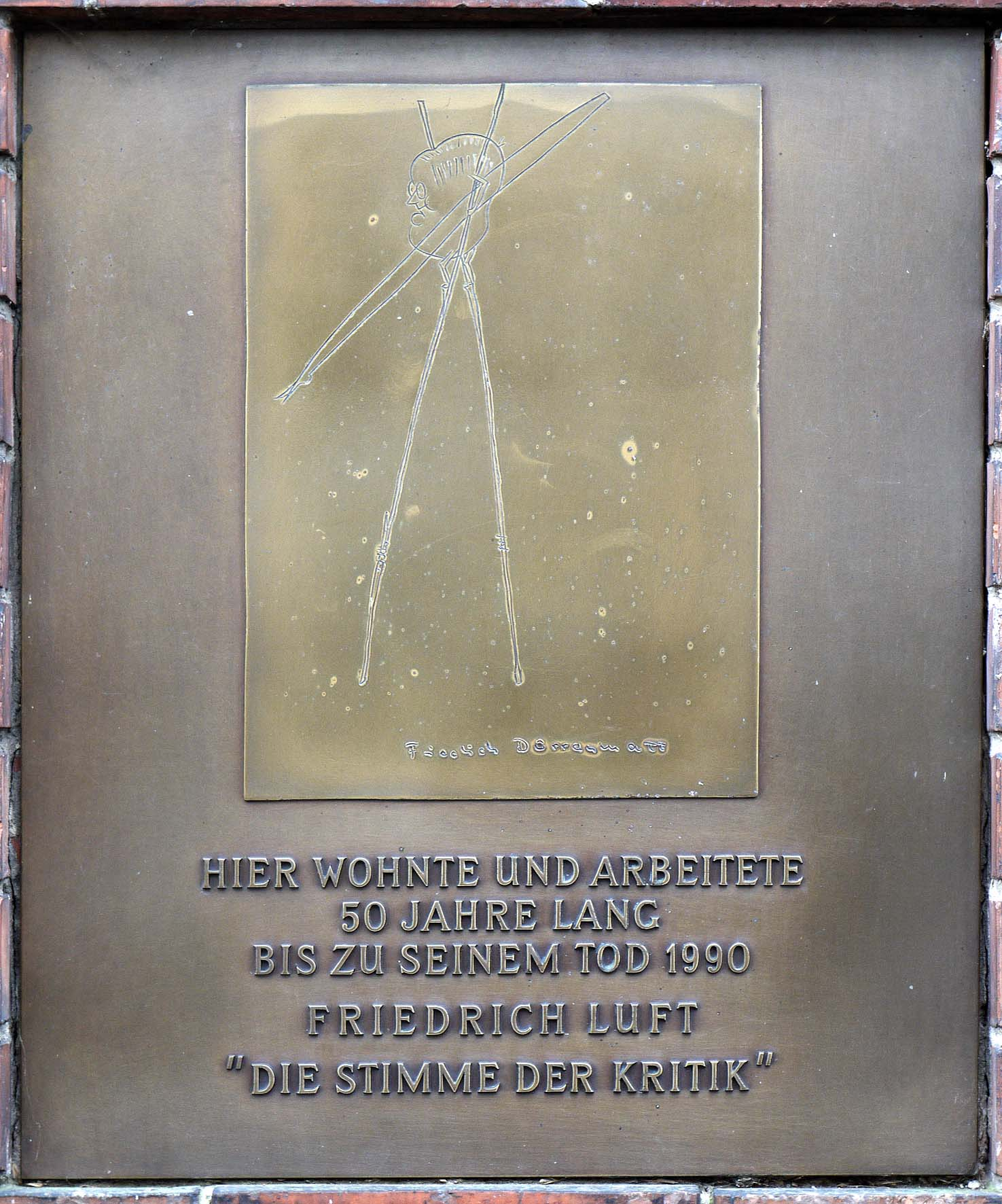
Commemorative plaque at the residence of Friedrich Luft, with signature of Friedrich Dürrenmatt

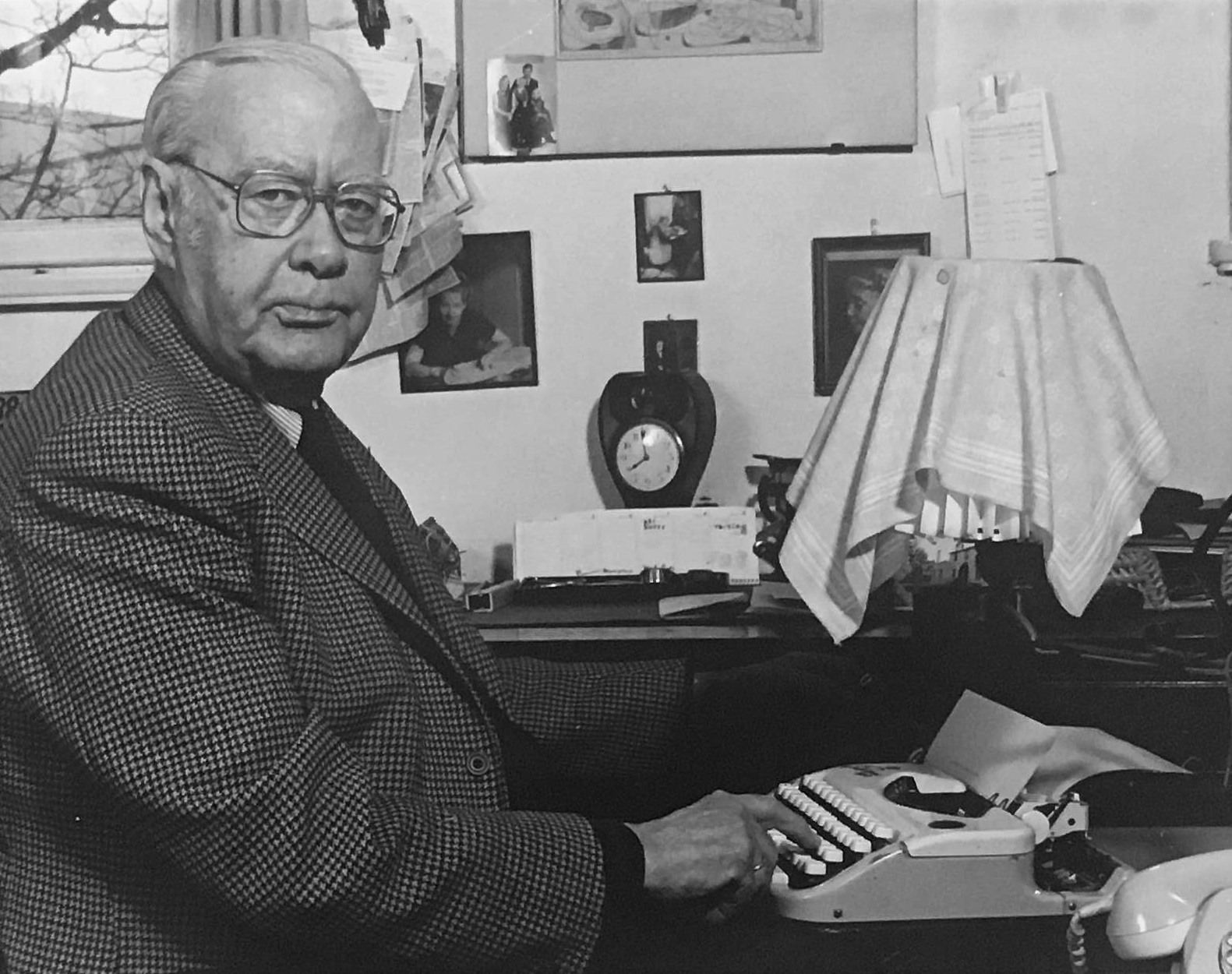
Friedrich Luft in his flat at Nollendorfplatz, 1985

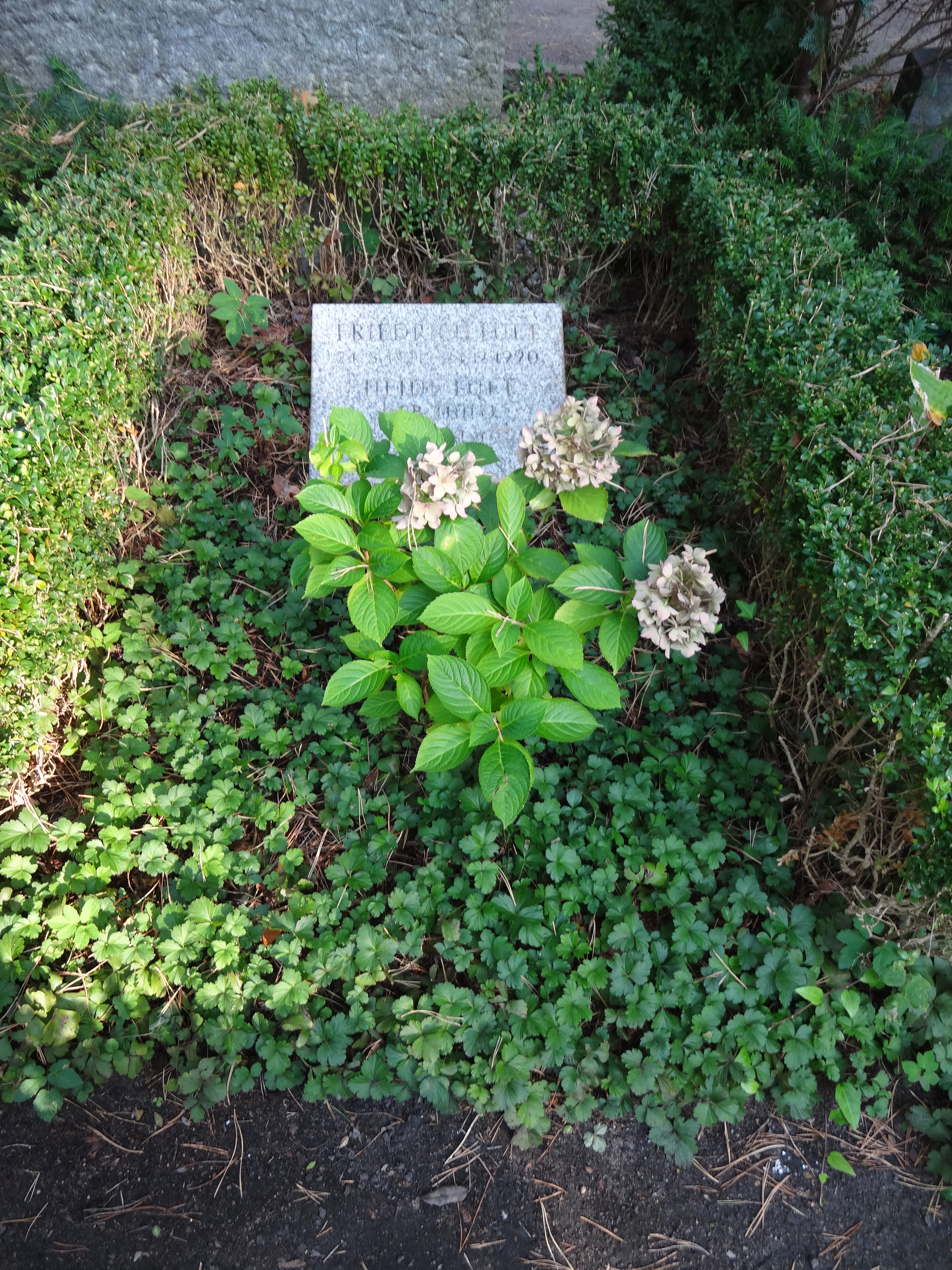
Friedrich Luft's grave

Born in Friedenau, Luft was the son of a German student councilor and a Scottish mother. His older brother was the German-American physiologist and university teacher Ulrich Cameron Luft. Luft grew up in the Friedenauer Kaiserallee 74 and attended the nearby Friedrich-Bergius-Schule at Maybachplatz (today: Perelsplatz). He studied German, English and History in Berlin and at the University of Königsberg. He listened with great interest to Max Herrmann lectures on theatre history. From 1936, he was a freelance writer. He wrote feuilletons for the Berliner Tageblatt and the Deutsche Allgemeine Zeitung. For the Oberkommando des Heeres, he wrote numerous screenplays, for example for the films Die Brieftaube im Einsatz and Das Pferd und die Gasmaske für das Pferd. He also produced texts for the cabaret artist Werner Finck. In 1940, he married the draughtswoman Heide Thilo.

Immediately after the Second World War, he initially worked for Der Tagesspiegel, which was founded in 1945. He had a column entitled Urbanus with everyday sketches from the Berlin post-war period that are still worth reading today. These were published in 1948 by Suhrkamp Verlag under the title Tagesblätter von Urbanus. Die Neue Zeitung, founded in 1947 by the American occupying power, took him into service as head of the feature section of its Berlin edition, as a theatre and film critic, until it ceased publication in 1955.

In 1959, he wrote the subtle 27-page preface to the autobiography Spiel im Dasein by Max Ophüls, the theatre and film director (Lola Montez, Letters from an Unknown) from Saarbrücken.

Above all, however, he was the "voice of criticism" at the radio station RIAS. Every Sunday at noon, from the first broadcast on 9 February 1946 – at that time still on DIAS (wire radio in the American sector) – until 28 October 1990 shortly before his death, he spoke in this capacity about Berlin theatre premieres of the previous week. As rhetoric peculiarities were his quick and sometimes breathlessly choppy speech, a sometimes drastic mode of expression combined with baroque squiggles as well as the same recurring farewell formula from the listeners:

We'll talk again in a week. As always - same time, same place, same wave. Yours, Friedrich Luft.

In addition to this, he later wrote articles for the Süddeutsche Zeitung and Die Welt. Luft also wrote the German dialogue book on the David Lean's classic The Bridge on the River Kwai from 1957.

Luft spoke fluent English. He lived and worked for 50 years until his death near the Nollendorfplatz in the Schöneberg Maienstraße 4, where a plaque commemorates the critic, who was very popular in Berlin at the time. Luft died in Berlin and was buried at the Waldfriedhof Dahlem together with his wife Heide, who worked as a graphic artist and illustrator. His grave is dedicated as a grave of honour to the city of Berlin.

In 1991, the "Friedrich-Luft-Archive" was established in the Academy of Arts, Berlin. It contains manuscripts of the reviews of his radio programme Stimme der Kritik as well as a collection of Lufts newspaper reviews and glosses from 1945 to 1990, his library and a tape archive with recordings of his radio programmes from the RIAS.

== Publications ==
- Luftballons. 1939
- Tagesblätter. by Urbanus. 1948
- Puella auf der Insel (Kinderbuch). 1949
- Quatsch in schöner Gestalt… – Vom Tiefsinn unserer Redner und Schreiber. In Die Welt, 4. Mai 1957
- Gustaf Gründgens. Rembrandt-Verlag, Berlin 1958 (2nd edition 1960)
- Vom großen, schönen Schweigen (Charlie Chaplin Biography). 1958
- Berliner Theater 1945–1961. Erhard Friedrich Verlag Velber bei Hannover 1961 (2nd edition 1962)
- Luftsprünge. 1962
- Stimme der Kritik. Velber bei Hannover 1965 (erste und zweite Auflage 1961 unter dem Titel Berliner Theater 1945–1961)
- Stimme der Kritik. Theaterereignisse seit 1965, Stuttgart 1979.
- Die Stimme der Kritik. Conversation with Hans-Christoph Knebusch. In the series "Zeugen des Jahrhunderts", 1991.

== Radio plays ==
- 1953: Karl Farkas: Bei Kerzenlicht – Editing (text): Curth Flatow, composition: Robert Katscher, Bearbeitung (music): Heinrich Riethmüller, mise en scène: Rolf Kutschera (Theatermitschnitt – RIAS Berlin)
- 1953: Franz von Schönthan and Paul von Schönthan: Der Raub der Sabinerinnen (Moderator) – editing (text): Friedrich Luft, mise en scène: Willi Sämann; Hanns Korngiebel (Theatermitschnitt – RIAS Berlin)

== Trivia ==
The Berliner Morgenpost has been awarding the "Friedrich-Luft-Preis" since 1992. This currently endowed with 7500 Euro- prize annually honours the best theatre performance in Berlin.
