= Wilhelmine Moik =

Austrian politician and trade unionist (1894–1970)

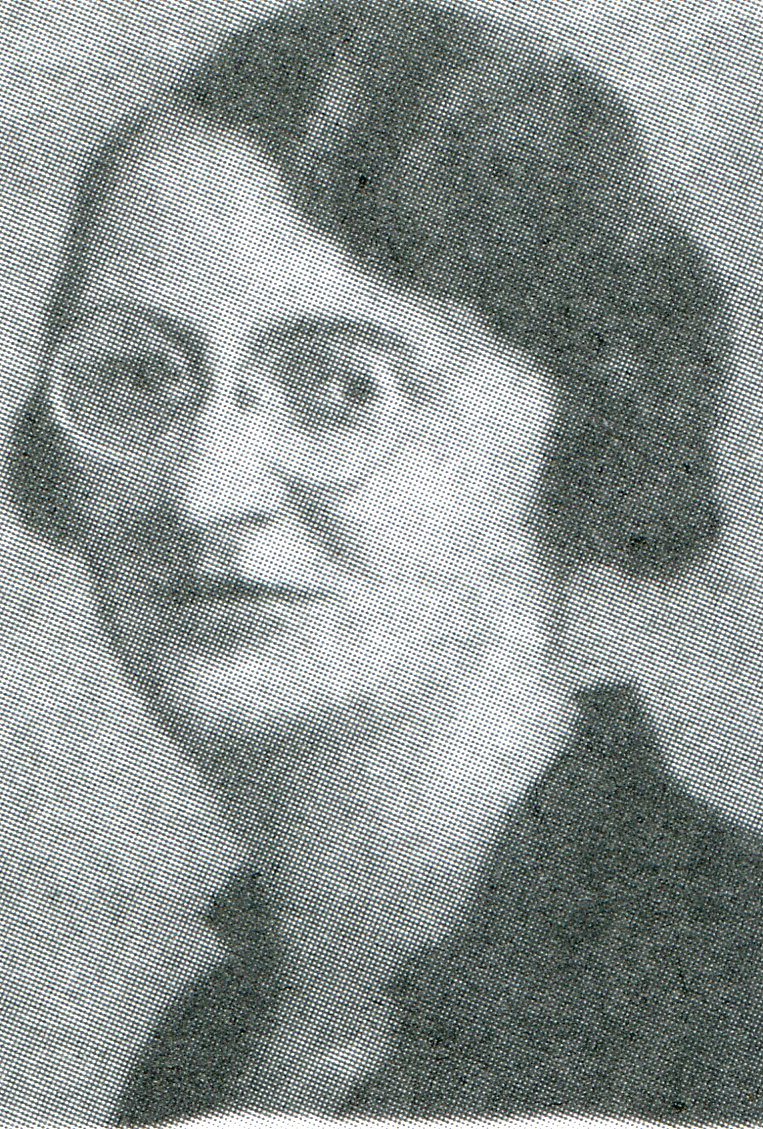
- Born: 26 September 1894; Vienna, Austria
- Died: 12 January 1970 (aged 75); Bad Vöslau, Austria

Wilhelmine Moik (26 September 1894 – 12 January 1970) was an Austrian politician and trade unionist.

== Biography ==
Wilhelmine Moik was born 26 September 1894 in Vienna, Austria, as one of a total of nine children of a toolmaker and a seamstress in the Viennese district Ottakring. She worked with her mother and siblings sewing bed linen in the cramped quarters of their home.

At the age of 17, she was forced to spend several months in hospital as a result of a lung ailment. One day after her 18th birthday, Moik joined the Social Democratic Labour Party (SDAP) and got her first job in the Domestic Workers Association. She had learned of the use and value of trade unions from her father and had attended meetings of the Social Democratic Labour Party and the Free Trade Unions. In 1916, she was employed by the Association of Housemaids and homeworkers and then, when she was working within the trade union commission, she became an employee of Anna Boschek, the first trade unionist in parliament. Moik became engaged in women's issues in the union and society.

In 1927, she was elected women secretary of the Confederation of Free Trade Unions. From 1927 to 1934, she worked closely with Käthe Leichter, who was murdered in 1942 in the Ravensbrück concentration camp. From 1932 to 1934, Moik was deputy of the SDAP in the Vienna City Council.

In February 1934, after the unions were outlawed, Moik became deeply involved in the cause of her party and Socialist Workers' Assistance. She spoke, gave lectures, supplied money, food, and clothing to the unionists. Because of her activities, Moik was arrested repeatedly. She spent time in prison in 1934, 1937, from 1938 to 1941 and 1944. After her release in 1941, she found work as a shorthand typist in a Vienna insurance company.

After the war, in November 1945, Moik was elected as a member of the Social Democratic Party of Austria (SPÖ) in the National Council, to which she belonged from December 1945 to December 1962. Moik rebuilt the unions in Austria and worked for the concerns of women and social issues. She was in part responsible for the General Social Security Act 1955 and in 1957, the Maternity Protection Act. From 1948 to 1963 she was also the chairman of the Vienna SPÖ women.

Moik, who never married and had no children, died in Bad Vöslau in 1970. She is remembered through several structures, the residential complex Wilhelmine-Moik-Hof in Ottakring, the hall in the headquarters of the Austrian Federation of Trade Unions and the square Wilhelmine-Moik-Platz in Vienna-Leopoldstadt.
