= Lincoln Grand Prix =

Annual bicycle road race in England

Coordinates: 53.234389°N 0.538853°W

Rapha Lincoln Grand Prix
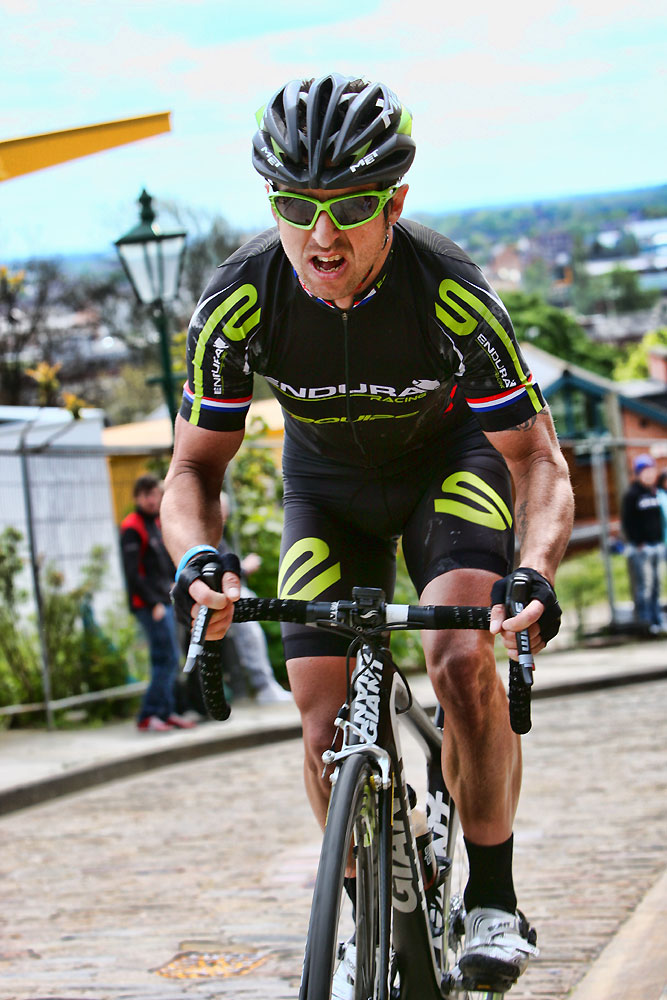
- Russell Downing in 2012 edition of Lincoln GP

Race details
- Date: May
- Region: Lincolnshire
- Nickname: Lincoln GP
- Discipline: Road Race
- Type: One-day
- Organiser: Gary Coltman previously Dan Ellmore and Ian Emmerson
- Web site: www.itpevents.co.uk

History (men)
- First edition: 1956
- First winner: Bob Eastwood (GBR)
- Most wins: Russell Downing (GBR) Paul Curran (GBR) (4 wins)
- Most recent: Oliver Wood (GBR)

History (women)
- First edition: 2015
- First winner: Lizzie Deignan (GBR)
- Most wins: Alice Barnes (GBR) Rebecca Durrell (GBR) (2 wins)
- Most recent: Morven Yeoman (GBR)

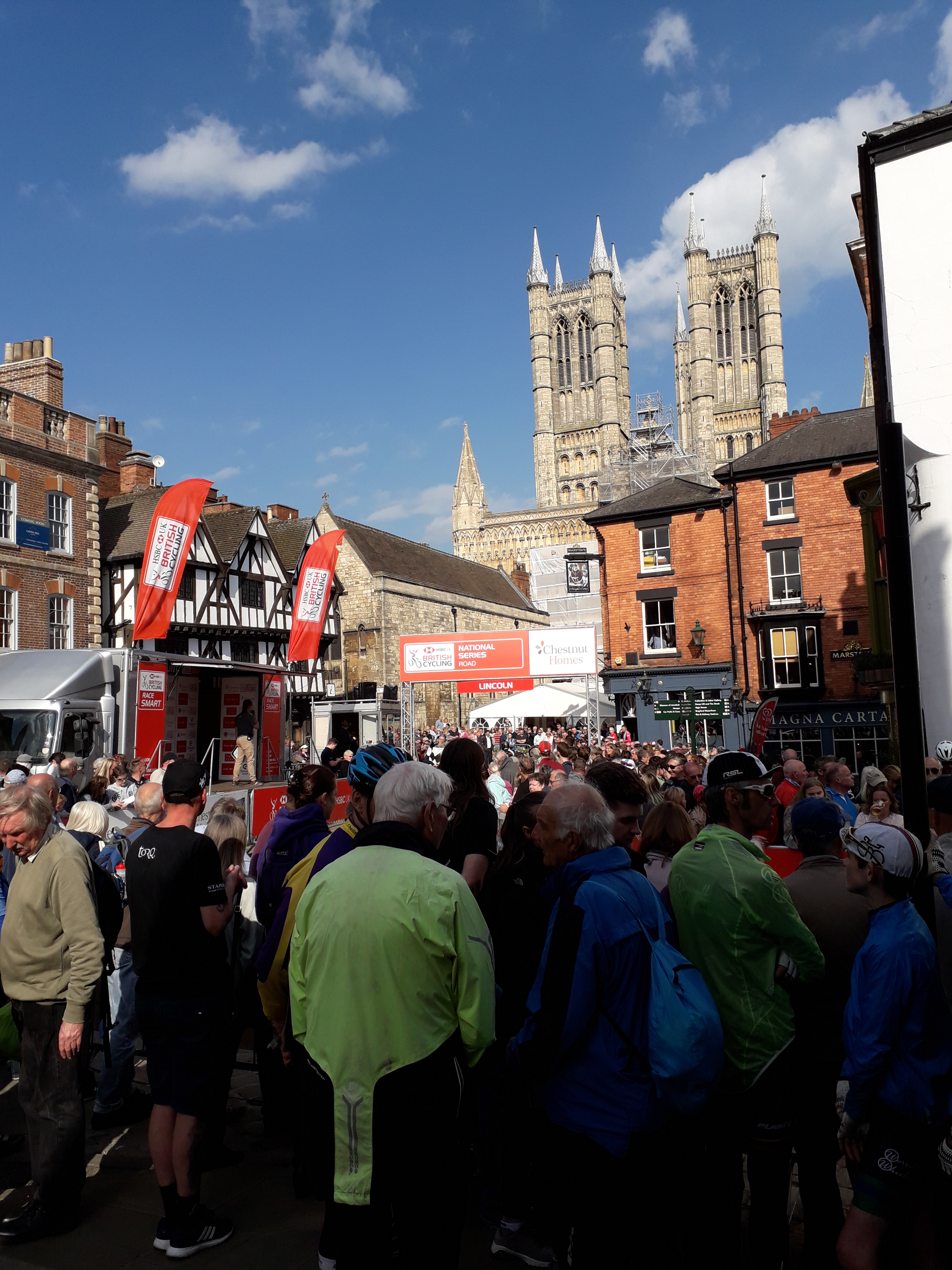
Finishing line of the 2019 edition in front of Lincoln Cathedral

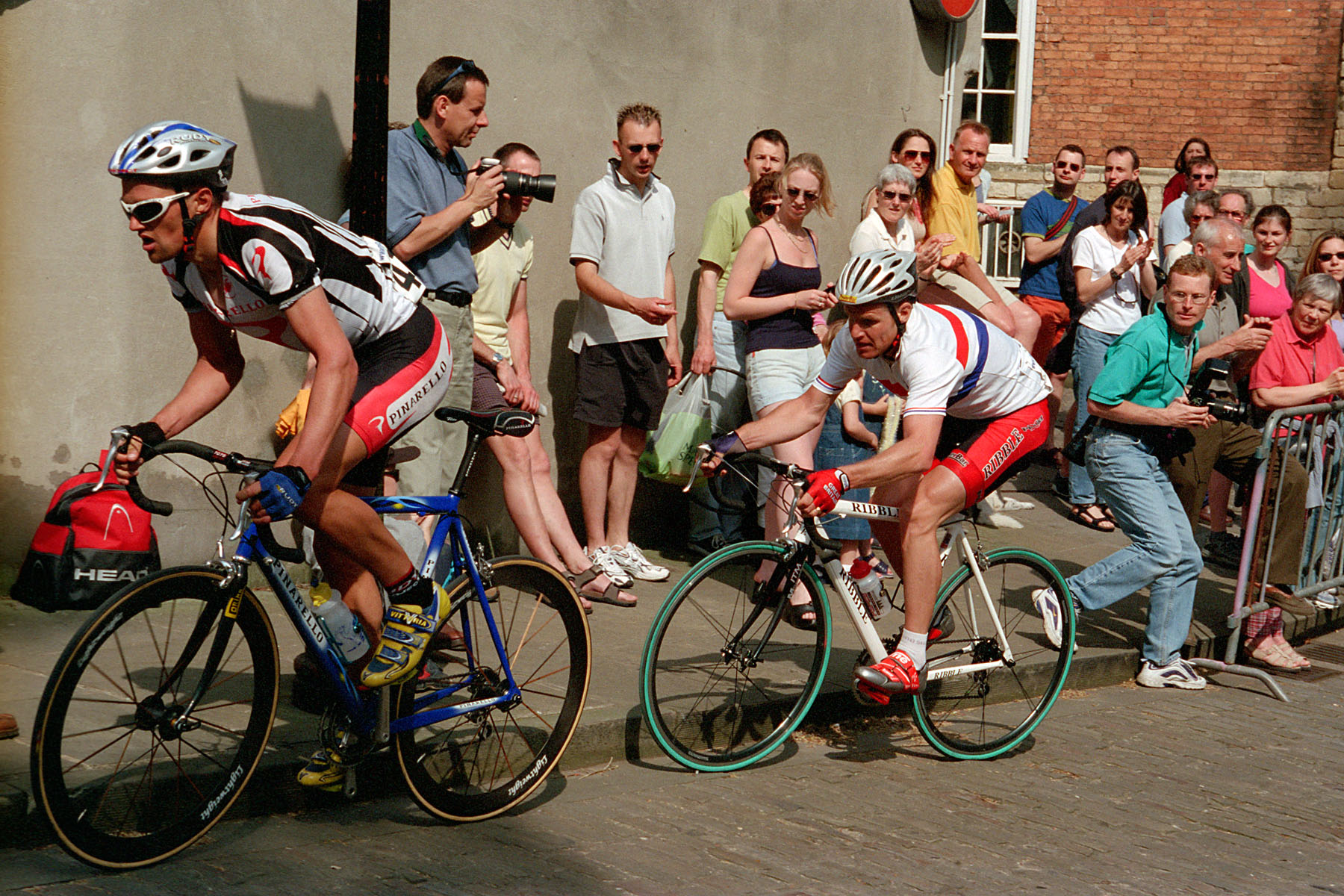
British Road Race Champion John Tanner (cyclist) - in second place behind Julian Winn, climb the cobbled climb Michealgate

The Rapha Lincoln Grand Prix (formerly the Witham-Valley Grand Prix) is a road bicycle race that starts and finishes in Lincoln. The 2021 version was 166 km long. The race is characterised by its ascent of Michaelgate, an iconic cobbled climb in the centre of Lincoln with a maximum gradient of 20%. The Lincoln GP has run since the summer of 1956, making it the oldest annual bike in the UK that still runs today.

== History ==
=== Witham-Valley Grand Prix (1956–1967) ===
In 1955, a group of four youth cyclists from Lincoln, England came together to form a road cycling club known as the Witham-Valley Road Racing Club. At the time a student engineer, Mike Jones was introduced to the newly formed club. He was a road racer from the Midlands who was working in Lincoln. Mike persuaded the committee of Witham-Valley RRC to promote a major road race and volunteered his services and time as an organiser, The first edition of the Witham-Valley Grand Prix took place in the summer of 1956. Huddersfield RC produced the race winner, Bob Eastwood who out-sprinted previous winner of the Tour of Britain, Tony Hewson, after 90 miles (145km) of racing. The following years, Ron Coe of Willson Cycles, would go onto start a dominant streak. Ron Coe started this in 1957, by out-sprinting Dave Bedwell on the line. The two riders would go on to do this a second time the following year. Ron Coe continued his successes in 1959, by completing his trio of wins by beating Harry Reynolds and Bill Bradley. The 1959 edition saw the tragic death of local rider Roy Hart who hit a van, whilst off the back of the peloton, and starting his last lap. The Roy Hart memorial trophy is still presented to the Grand Prix winner.

John Perks of Falcon Cycles would go onto win the following two editions of the race in 1960 and 1961, followed in 1962 by Jim Grieves racing for Helyett Cycles. Albert Hitchin who was very dominant prior to the race took a lone win in 1963 and lead a Viking Cycles 1-2-3 beating both of his teammates, Stan Brittain and Bernard Burns. Hitchin went on to retain the trophy for a second year in 1964 with England international rider Derek Harrison coming second. The 1965 edition was nominated as an official selection event for the road world championships. Arthur Durham won the edition beating Doug Dailey and Roger Claridge.

Velo Club Lincoln took over the Witham-Valley Grand Prix starting in 1966. A break away group of 6 riders would form in the 1966 edition of the race. Sprinter John Clarey lead the group from 60 miles out, holding off a chase group formed of Hugh Porter and Les West. Clarey won the race by 3 bike lengths ahead of Brian Rourke and Owen Davis who was Lincolnshire champion at the time. In 1967, New Zealander Des Thompson became the first foreign winner leaving a small break for a solo win. Third in the 1967 race was the present day commentator for the Lincoln GP, Roger Hobby.

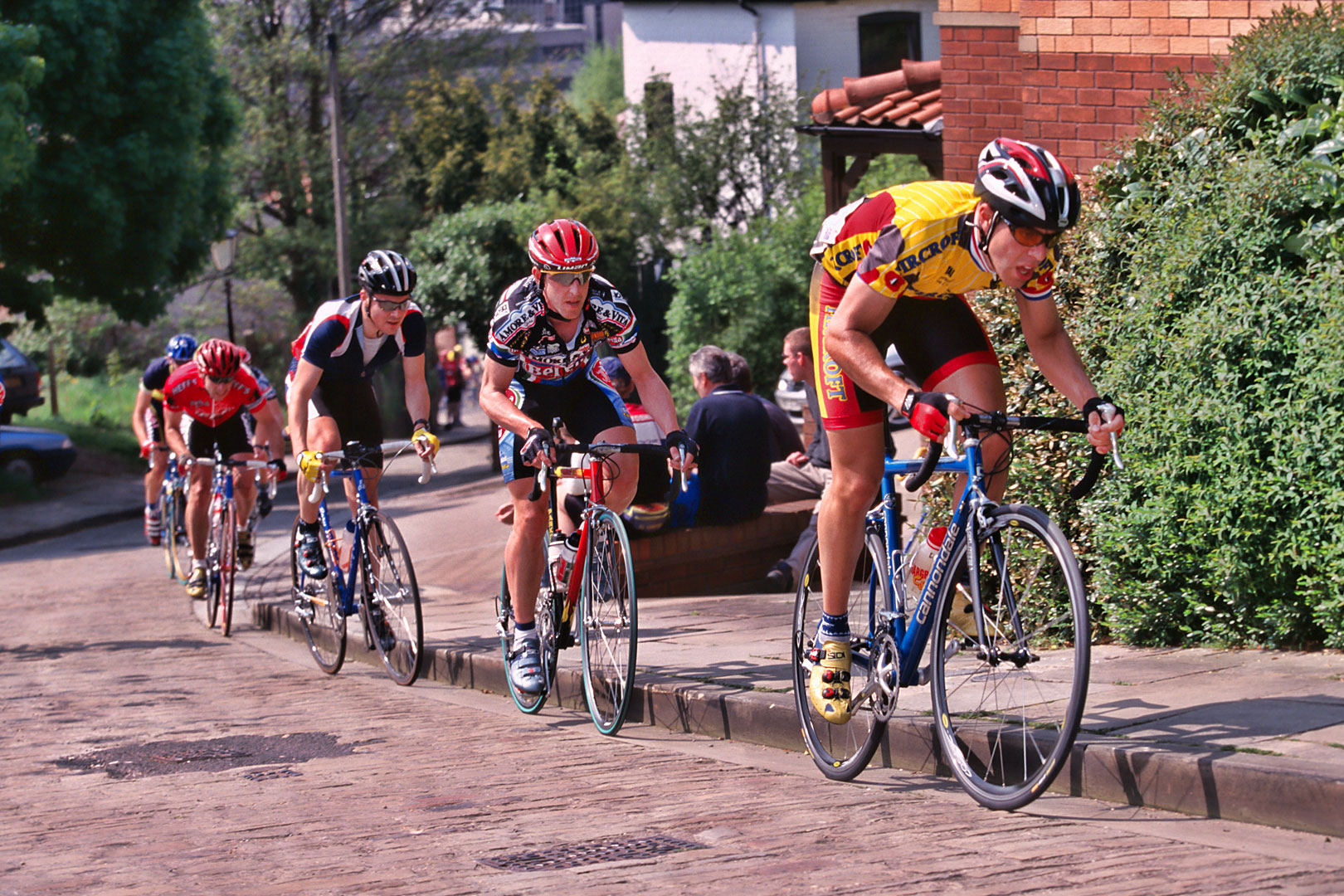
Another Time Up The Hill for Bournemouth Arrow - Fircroft rider who leads in the 2000 Lincoln Grand Prix

=== Lincoln Grand Prix (1968–present) ===
Velo Club Lincoln changed the name of the Witham-Valley Grand Prix to the Lincoln Grand Prix in 1968. Doug Dailey went onto win the first race named Lincoln GP, catching Les West on the run up to the finish, with Graham Owen in 3rd place in a small group ahead of the main pack. Star Trophy ranking had now awarded to the Lincoln GP. For the next 3 years well-known riders dominated the race. In 1969, Clifton CC's all rounder, Pete Smith won by a margin of 1min 51sec. Tom Mullins won the next round of racing in 1970 from a big bunch finish. In both 1969 and 1970, Beeston RC's Ian Hallam finished 3rd on the podium. In 1971, track pursuit rider Dave Allen from Birkenhead North End CC finished first. At the 1972 edition there was a 2-way fight between Britain's leading road racers, Phill Edwards and Phill Bayton. Brayton made a big attack with just 2 miles to go, which Edwards successfully countered and beat his opponent by 3 bike lengths on the finishing line. On a wet day in 1973 Dave Vose beat Peter Watson from Clifton CC and his own team mate John Clewarth to take the win for Kirby CC. Archer RC's, Steve Heffernan went on to win the Grand Prix of 1974 where Beeston RC's Ian Hallam came 3rd again. 1975 marked the 20th edition of the Lincoln GP in which Tony Gornall of Clayton Velo out-sprinted the main bunch leading home a select group of just 17 riders. 1976 produced one of the best races yet. The race finished with a sprint between 2 riders after what had been a very fast race with an average above 26mph. Bill Nixon beat Joe Waugh and was 2min 33sec up of future race winner, Steve Lawrence.

The 1977 edition was just as good a race with a breakaway group formed early in containing all the race favourites; however, it had a slightly chaotic finish. A junior race that was happening at the same time as the main Lincoln GP had just received their bell for the last lap, at which point, the race leaders came through the finish line approximately 30 seconds later. It was apparent to the organisers that the leaders of the men's race and remains of the break away would catch the juniors, so after a re-think the organisers added a 1 mile extension, leaving some of the seniors, including Dave Cumming, confused and temporarily losing contact with the race. Dave Cumming managed to out sprint Steve Lawrence and the remaining group to take the win. Ian Hallam placed 3rd yet again. At this point Steve Lawrence, who was riding for VC Olympia Sport at the time, had finished in both places other than first, on the podium. In 1978 he finally took the win, after working hard to chase down Scottish rider Robert Miller was 30 seconds ahead entering the last lap. Miller dropped to 5th by the time the line came around again, after being caught by Lawrence and a number of other riders.

Lincoln Grand Prix gained International Status for racing in 1999.

The 2015 Edition was held as the British national championships and was also the first year of the women's Lincoln GP.

==== Overcoming financial challenges ====
The Lincoln GP announced in early 2020 that it was facing financial challenges after losing one of its key sponsors, Chestnut Homes, who blamed Brexit for the decrease the housing market. The search for a new title sponsor received a further a blow recently when British Cycling announced they would no longer fund a TV highlights shows for its National Road Series, of which the Lincoln Grand Prix is a part. After a plea by the race organiser, and as social media campaign, it was announced in late February 2020 that the race would take place in 2020 and 2021, thanks to the financial backing of sportswear brand, Rapha. Rapha stated that they aimed to create a more sustainable sponsorship model to support the race in the future by selling Lincoln GP branded Caps and merchandise The 2020 Edition of the race was later cancelled due to the ongoing COVID-19 pandemic.

In 2021, partly thanks to COVID-19, that years race was held as the national championships and with the financial security brought by Rapha, the one-day race was expanded to a series of 4 individual races, that took place between 14 October 2021 - 17 October 2021. Day 1 and 2 saw Ethan Hayter win both the National Time Trial Championship, as well as the National Criterium Championship. Day 3 saw an amateur Hill Climb Competition, and Day 4 was the Lincoln GP that incorporated the National Road race Championship. INEOS Grenadiers team mates, Ethan Hayter and Ben Swift worked together to break up the race, ultimately leading to Swift been crowned National Champion after an attack on the final lap.

The 2022 Lincoln Grand Prix was scheduled for Sunday 8 May and will make up part of the National Road Series.

In 2023 the organisation of the Lincoln Grand Prix was taken over by Gary Coltman.

The first stage of the 2026 edition of the Tour of Britain Men finish on 5 laps of the same course used by the Lincoln Grand Prix.

== Winners ==
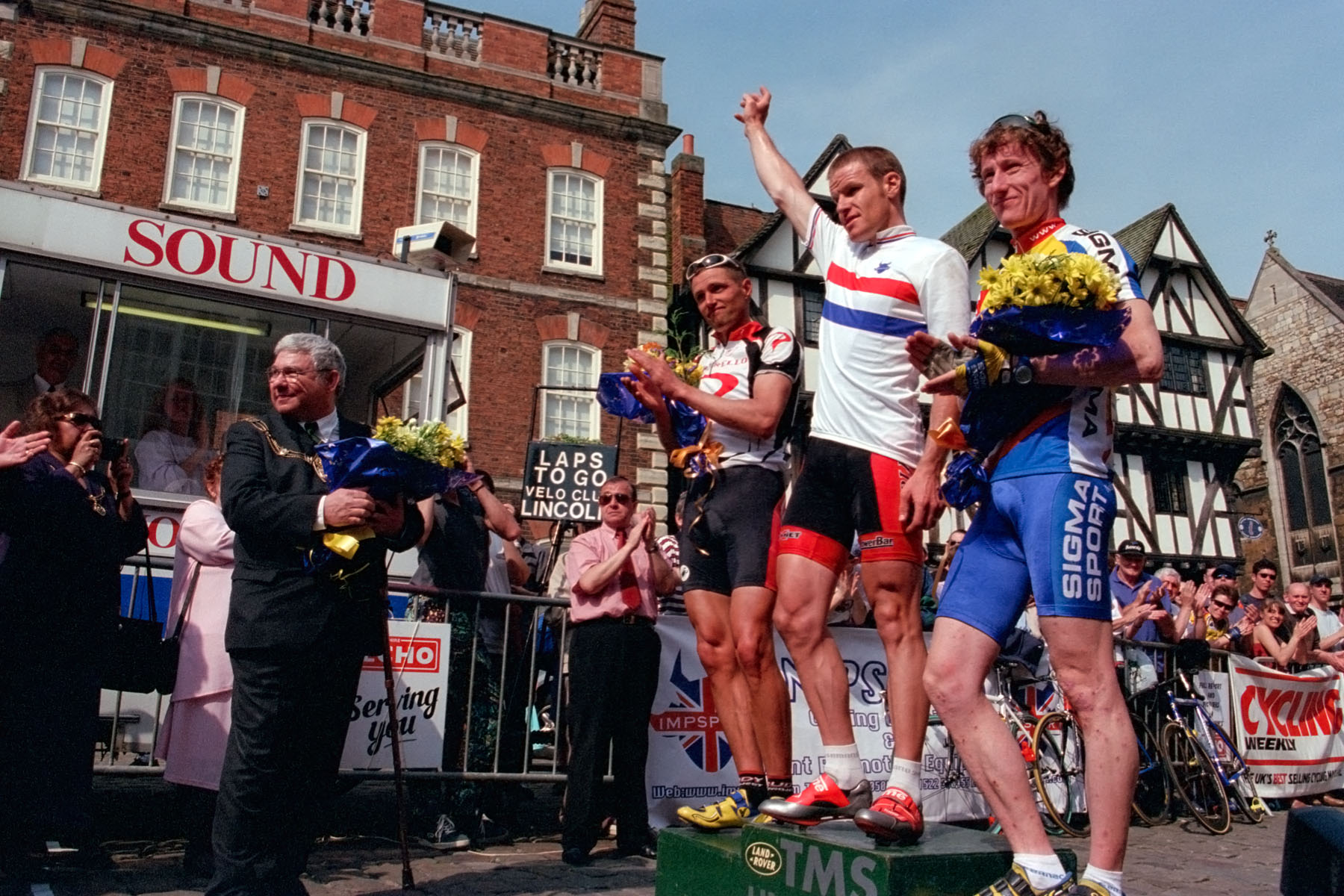
Race winner John Tanner stands on the podium after his 2001 win

=== Men ===
Year	Country	Rider	Team
1956	Great Britain	Bob Eastwood	Huddersfield Road Club
1957	Great Britain	Ron Coe	Wilson Cycles
1958	Great Britain	Ron Coe	Elswick Hopper
1959	Great Britain	Ron Coe	Elswick Hopper
1960	Great Britain	John Perks	Falcon Cycles
1961	Great Britain	John Perks	Falcon Cycles
1962	Great Britain	Jim Grieves	Helyett Cycles
1963	Great Britain	Albert Hitchen	Viking Cycles
1964	Great Britain	Albert Hitchen	Falcon Cycles
1965	Great Britain	Arthur Durham	Falcon Cycles
1966	Great Britain	John Clarey	Woolwich Cycling Club
1967	New Zealand	Des Thomson	New Zealand
1968	Great Britain	Doug Dailey	Kikby Cycling Club
1969	Great Britain	Pete Smith	Clifton Cycling Club
1970	Great Britain	Tom Mullins	Rockingham Cycling Club
1971	Great Britain	Dave Allen (Note: Reputable sources note that Allen's nationality is both Great Britain and New Zealand.)	Birkenhead North End CC
1972	Great Britain	Phil Edwards	Western Road Club
1973	Great Britain	Dave Vose	Kirkby Cycling Club
1974	Great Britain	Steve Heffernan	Archer Road Club
1975	Great Britain	Tony Gornall	Clayton Velo
1976	Great Britain	Bill Nickson	East Liverpool Wheelers
1977	Great Britain	Dave Cuming	Kirkby Cycling Club
1978	Great Britain	Steve Lawrence	VC Olympia Sport
1979	Great Britain	Geoff Taylor	Liverpool Century
1980	Great Britain	Steve Joughin	Manchester Wheelers
1981	Great Britain	Phil Thomas	Liverpool Mercury
1982	Great Britain	Mark Bell	Manchester Wheelers
1983	Great Britain	Malcolm Elliott	Manchester Wheelers
1984	Great Britain	Neil Martin	Angliasport
1985	Great Britain	Darryl Webster	Manchester Wheelers
1986	Great Britain	Paul Curran	Manchester Wheelers
1987	Great Britain	Paul Curran	Manchester Wheelers
1988	Great Britain	Paul Curran	Manchester Wheelers
1989	Great Britain	Mark Gornall	Manchester Wheelers
1990	Great Britain	Brian Smith	Velo Club d'Or
1991	Great Britain	Paul Curran	Ace Racing Team
1992	Great Britain	John Charlesworth	Ace Racing Team
1993	Great Britain	Keith Reynolds	Banana Energy Fruit
1994	Great Britain	Chris Walker	Lex – Townsend
1995	Great Britain	Mark Walsham	Tritech
1996	Great Britain	Kevin Dawson	Optimum Performance
1997	Great Britain	John Tanner	Controlware
1998	Great Britain	Chris Lillywhite	Individuele
1999	Lithuania	Saulius Ruškys	Saint-Quentin–Oktos–MBK
2000	Great Britain	Chris Newton	Middridge CRT
2001	Great Britain	John Tanner	Ribble – Pro Vision
2002	Great Britain	Huw Pritchard	Angliasport
2003	Great Britain	Mark Lovatt	Life Repair Group
2004	Ireland	David O'Loughlin	Total cycling.com
2005	Great Britain	Russell Downing	Recycling.co.uk–MG X-Power
2006	Great Britain	Kristian House	Recycling.co.uk
2007	Great Britain	Dean Downing	Recycling.co.uk
2008	Great Britain	Russell Downing	Pinarello Racing Team
2009	Great Britain	Russell Downing	CandiTV–Marshalls Pasta
2010	Great Britain	Chris Newton	Rapha Condor–Sharp
2011	Great Britain	Scott Thwaites	Endura Racing
2012	Great Britain	Russell Downing	Endura Racing
2013	Great Britain	Peter Kennaugh	Team Sky
2014	Great Britain	Yanto Barker	Team Raleigh
2015 (Note: This year included British National Road Race Championships and entry was only open to British riders.)	Great Britain	Peter Kennaugh	Team Sky
2016	Great Britain	Thomas Stewart	Madison Genesis
2017	Great Britain	Ian Bibby	JLT–Condor
2018	Great Britain	Alexandar Richardson	ONE Pro Cycling
2019	Great Britain	Thomas Stewart	Canyon dhb p/b Bloor Homes
2020	No race due to COVID-19 pandemic		
2021	Great Britain	Ben Swift	INEOS Grenadiers
2022	United States	Luke Lamperti	Trinity Racing
2023	Great Britain	Alexandar Richardson	Saint Piran
2024	Great Britain	Matthew Holmes	
2025	Great Britain	James McKay	Wheelbase CabTech Castelli
2026	Great Britain	Oliver Wood	Rapha Cycling Club

Most Wins
Rider	Times Won	Seasons
Paul Curran	4	1986, 1987, 1988, 1991
Russell Downing	4	2005, 2008, 2009, 2012
Ron Coe	3	1957, 1958, 1959
Paul Curran	3	1987, 1988, 1991
John Perks	2	1960, 1961
Albert Hitchen	2	1963, 1964
John Tanner	2	1997, 2001
Chris Newton	2	2000, 2010
Peter Kennaugh	2	2013, 2015
Tom Stewart	2	2016, 2019
Alexandar Richardson	2	2018, 2023

=== Women ===
Year	Country	Rider	Team
2015	Great Britain	Lizzie Deignan	SD Worx
2016	Great Britain	Alice Barnes	Drops
2017	Great Britain	Alice Barnes	Drops
2018	Great Britain	Rebecca Durrell	Storey Racing
2019	Great Britain	Rebecca Durrell	CAMS–Basso Bikes
2020	No race due to COVID-19 pandemic		
2021	Great Britain	Pfeiffer Georgi	Team DSM
2022	Great Britain	Becky Storrie	CAMS–Basso
2023	Great Britain	Robyn Clay	Pro-Noctis–Heidi Kjeldsen–200 Degrees Coffee
2024	Great Britain	Kate Richardson	Lifeplus Wahoo
2025	Great Britain	Lauren Dickson	Handsling Alba Development Road Team
2026	Great Britain	Morven Yeoman	DAS–Hutchinson

Most Wins
Rider	Times Won	Seasons
Alice Barnes	2	2016, 2017
Rebecca Durrell	2	2018, 2019
