= BML Munjal University =

Private university in Haryana, India

- Motto: "From Here to the World"
- Type: Private
- Established: 2014
- Founders: Brijmohan Lall Munjal
- Chancellor: Sunil Kant Munjal
- Vice-Chancellor: Shyam Menon
- Location: Sidhrawali, Haryana, India; 28.248°N 76.814°E
- Website: www.bmu.edu.in

BML Munjal University is a fully residential and co-educational private university located in Sidhrawali, Gurgaon district, Haryana, India. The university was founded in 2014 by the promoters of the Hero Group, and is named after the group's chairman and founder Brijmohan Lall Munjal. It offers B.Tech., BCom (Honours), BBA, MBA, Law and Ph.D. degrees.

== History ==
The university was launched in two phases. The School of Engineering & Technology, School of Management and School of Commerce will be established in phase I, beginning August 2014. In phase II, four additional schools are proposed: School of Liberal Arts, School of Art, Architecture & Design, School of Natural Sciences and School of Law.

== Founders ==
- Brijmohan Lall Munjal (Padma Bhushan awardee)
- Renu Munjal
- Suman Kant Munjal
- Pawan Munjal
- Sunil Kant Munjal
- Akshay Munjal
