= Raman Munjal Vidya Mandir =

- Sidhrawali, Haryana; India

Information
- Type: Private
- Motto: संस्कृतम्: " " (Meaning:- Hindi:"अज्ञान रूपी अंधकार से ज्ञानरूपी प्रकाश की ओर ले जाएँ"; English:"Light up with Radiance")
- Established: 1992
- Area trustee: Raman Kant Munjal Foundation (RKMF), A Hero Honda Motors Ltd. (now Hero MotoCorp Ltd.) Initiative
- Principal: Ms. Santosh Yadav
- Grades: Nursery School to Twelfth Grade
- Campus: Sidhrawali Village (Rural)
- Nickname: RMVM
- Affiliation: Central Board of Secondary Education (CBSE)
- Website: http://www.rmvmschool.in./

Raman Munjal Vidya Mandir is an education institution located in Sidhrawali Village in the Gurgaon District of Haryana, India. Situated at the 67th milestone on Delhi-Jaipur Highway (NH 8), the foundation was laid in 1992 by the Munjal Family (who owns Hero Group) in the loving memory of the Director of Hero Honda Motors Ltd. (now Hero MotoCorp Ltd.), late Mr. Raman Kant Munjal.

The institution was established in order to provide education to the rural people of nearby areas to help them attain a better lifestyle and to promote knowledge at the most basic level, something that can advance the whole country.

It is maintained by the Raman Kant Munjal Foundation (RKMF), whose chairperson is Mrs. Renu Munjal.

== Campus ==
The campus is situated alongside of Delhi-Jaipur Highway (NH8), in the outskirts of sidhrawali village. There are three buildings on campus: Senior Wing, Junior Wing and College.

== Facilities ==
The institution offers all the three streams Science, Commerce and Humanities to its senior secondary classes (Eleventh & Twelfth) with faculties in nearby areas.

Yearly, the school gives medical check ups (Rs100/- per Student) to all students to ensure general health. There is also a vocational centre on the premises where girls from nearby villages come to learn sewing, stitching and tailoring. A computer learning centre also exists for both boys and girls.

From eighth grade onwards they can also opt. to National Cadet Corps (popularly known as NCC) and could be the Cadets of 8th Haryana Battalion for 2 Years NCC Training and to achieve 'A' Grade Certificate.

The institution runs a program named Asha to benefit the students of local villages by providing them with tutors after their regular classes, accompanied by lectures discussing socioeconomic conditions and Western standards to compete with in the world outside India.

== Legacy ==
As the institution was established by Hero Group, most of the employees of Hero Honda Motors Ltd. (now Hero MotoCorp Ltd.) put their children in Raman Munjal Vidya Mandir, almost two-thirds of its students belongs with families who are engaged Hero MotoCorp Ltd. and other Hero Group Industries.

The institution upon its popularity terms and good faith among the local people considered as "The Best School" in the nearby areas.

=== Celebrities and celebrations ===
It had gained much popularity due to celebrity influence in its annual day programmes and other celebrations, there are various personalities who visited the institution such as

- Kapil Dev,
- Deepender Singh Hooda (Loksabha MP and son of Chief Minister Of Haryana Bhupinder Singh Hooda),
- Ismail Darbar,
- Debojit (Sa Re Ga Ma Pa Challenge 2005 winner),
- Ashutosh Kaushik (MTV Hero Honda Roadies 5.0 Winner in 2007),
- Abhas Joshi (Amul STAR Voice of India contestant)
- Afsha Musani and Dhairya Sorecha (Hosts of Sa Re Ga Ma Pa Li'l Champs 2009)

and many others, which attracts the huge population and a lot of youth towards the institution.

== Faculty ==
- Principal: Ms. Santosh Yadav
