= Tawstock Tower =

Tower in Tawstock, Devon, England

Coordinates: 51°03′30″N 4°03′50″W

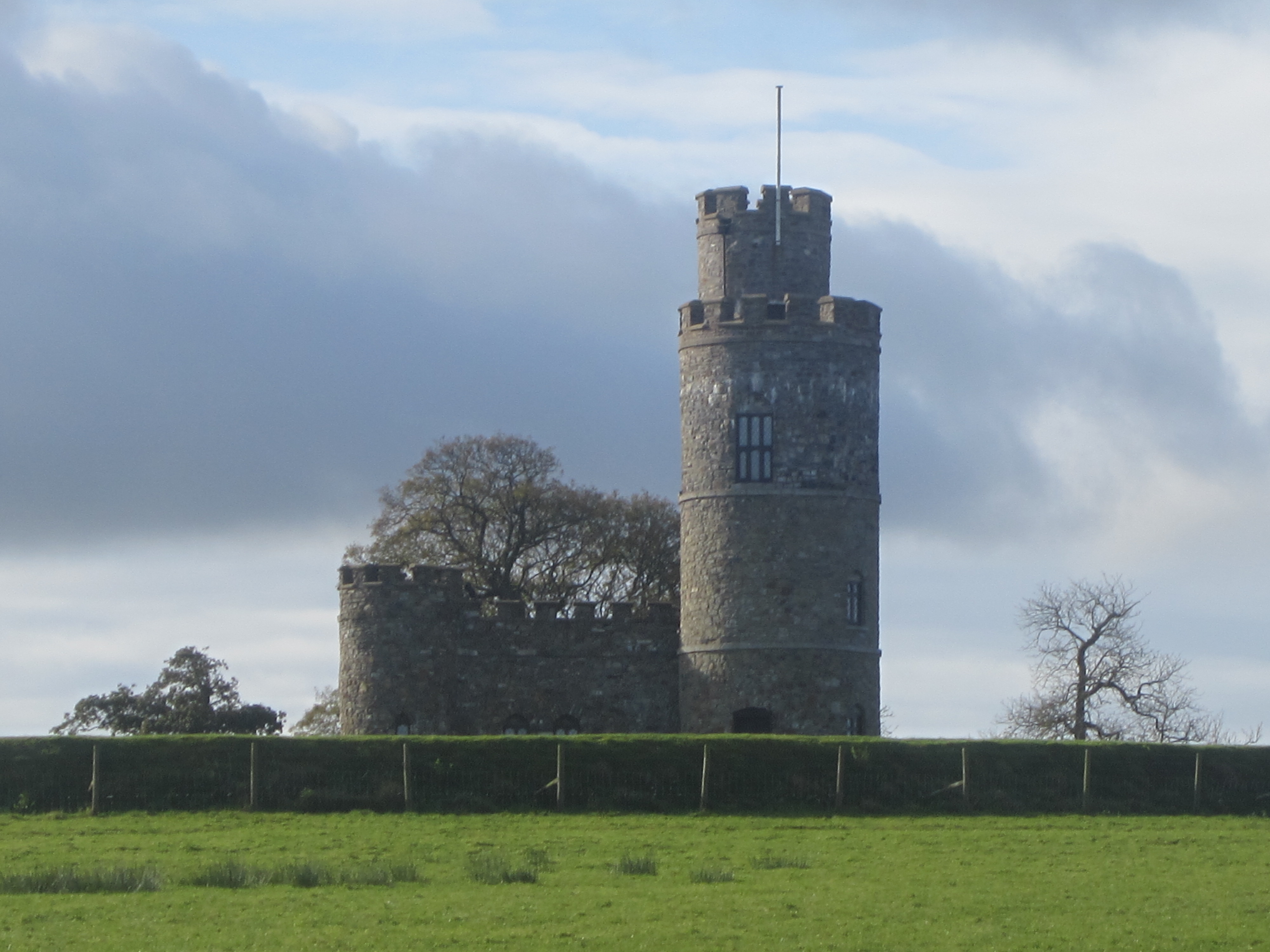
Tawstock Tower in 2016

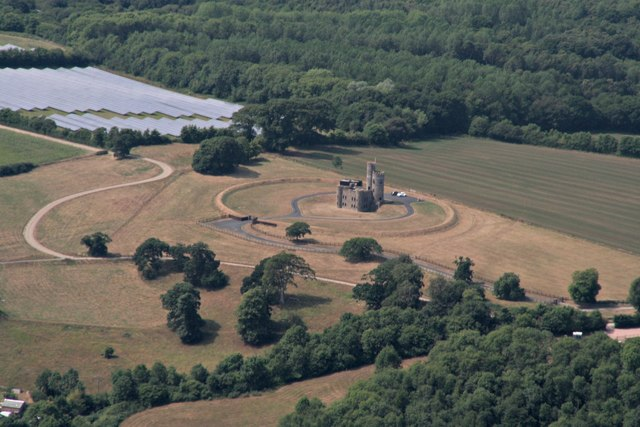
An aerial view of the tower in 2018

Tawstock Tower (also known as Tawstock Castle and The Tower) is a folly building dating from the 18th-century that stands in the village of Tawstock in North Devon.

It has been listed Grade II on the National Heritage List for England (NHLE) since February 1965. The NHLE listing describes the building as a "Folly, built in form of look-out tower". It is constructed from stone rubble and has Gothic style windows openings on each stage of the tower. It was built in the 18th-century The tower has views over nearby Barnstaple and the Taw Valley.

In the 1986 first edition of their book Follies, Grottoes & Garden Buildings, Gwyn Headley and Wim Meulenkamp stated that the tower had been observed in 1954 "but no trace now remains". Headley and Meulenkamp apologised for this earlier error in the 1999 edition of the book, having been contacted in the intervening years by numerous readers who had observed the tower from the nearby railway line to Barnstaple.

It was bought by a property developer in 1988 and was renovated as a private residence over 14 years. Local stone was used from derelict buildings and a Great Hall was created. In September 2002 it was on sale for £625,000. It had been renovated as a private family home over the previous 14 years. It sold for more than £900,000. It was put up for sale with Knight Frank in 2024 for £1.5 million.
