= Viking Cycle Company =

British bicycle manufacturer

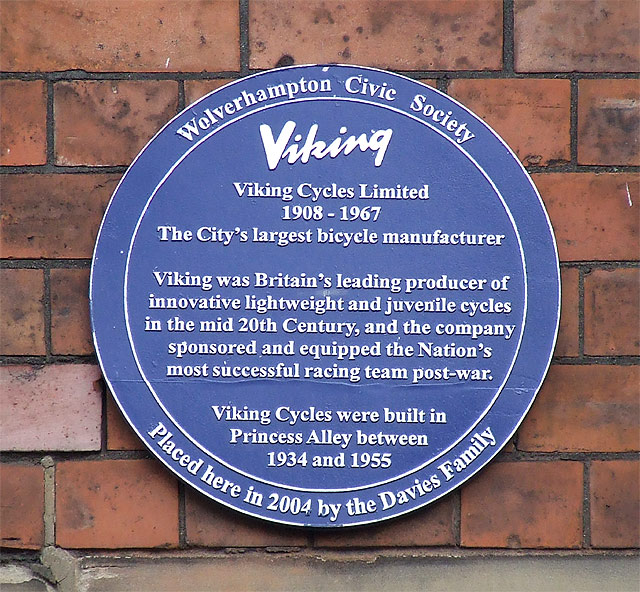
Blue plaque marking the location of the Viking Cycle Company showroom

The Viking Cycle Company was an English bicycle company. Founded in 1908 in Wolverhampton as a bicycle repair shop, it became a manufacturer and sponsored a racing team. The company closed in 1967; the business was purchased and reestablished as Viking Cycles, an assembler in Derry, Northern Ireland. The brand was later sold to Avocet Sports of Manchester, which imported rebadged bicycles into the UK under the Viking name. Following the acquisition of Avocet by the Indian company Hero Cycles, the brand name has been used by its Insync Bikes division.

== History ==
Alfred Victor Davies went into bicycle repair in 1908 to supplement his wages as a railwayman, and continued with it full-time when ordered to stop because rules forbade second jobs. Around 1935, after twice moving and acquiring an additional building for the works, the company started manufacturing frames rather than simply assembling bicycles. Alfred Davies was succeeded by his son, Reg Davies, who registered the company as Viking Cycles Limited in 1939. During the Second World War, the company produced munitions.

After the war production rose from about 800 cycles a year in the late 1940s to more than 20,000 in 1963, making Viking the city's largest-ever bicycle manufacturer. The company diversified into lightweight racing bicycles and they began Viking road racers team in 1948, managed by former Wolverhampton Wheeler Bob Thom, who later also became sales manager. At its production peak in the mid-1960s, the company employed about 70 people.

In the 1960s club cycling declined, but Davies designed a child's bicycle with telescopic rear stays and a telescopic seat tube which could be adjusted as the child grew, rather than buying a series of new cycles. This model eventually accounted for three-quarters of the company's business.

The company closed in 1967. It was bought by two Americans, who established Viking Cycles, a bicycle assembler in Derry. This encountered financial problems and in 1981 Merseyside County Council considered buying the brand and opening a company to be headed by the bicycle racer and designer Frank Clements. In 2001 the Viking Cycles brand was bought by Avocet Sports, of Manchester; the trademark was registered to them in June 2002.

In August 2015, Hero Cycles, an Indian company owned by Pankaj M Munjal, bought a majority stake in Avocet. Hero have relaunched the Viking Cycles brand to be sold under their new British and European master brand Insync Bikes.
