= Om Prakash Munjal =

Indian businessman, philanthropist (1928–2015)

- Born: 26 August 1928; Kamalia, Punjab, British India
- Died: 13 August 2015 (aged 86); Ludhiana, Punjab, India
- Occupations: Co-founder and Chairman of Hero Cycles
- Years active: 1944–2015
- Spouse: Sudarshan Munjal
- Children: 5

Om Prakash Munjal (26 August 1928 – 13 August 2015) was an Indian businessman, poet and philanthropist. He was the founder and chairman of Hero Cycles, the world's largest integrated bicycle manufacturing company by volume and Hero Motors, an Indian two-wheeler components manufacturer, and ventured into newer business fields including luxury hotels and four-wheeler components. He is also known for philanthropic activities of running various schools and hospitals. He died on 13 August 2015 at DMC Hero Heart Centre, Ludhiana.

== Early life ==
Om Prakash Munjal was born in Kamalia, in a Punjabi Hindu Khatri family, to Bahadur Chand Munjal and Thakur Devi.

In 1944, his family moved to Amritsar to start a bicycle spare parts business with his three brothers, Brijmohan Lall Munjal, Dayanand Munjal and Satyanand Munjal. The business flourished, however, within a few years, the Partition of India occurred and severely affected the business environment in Amritsar. The brothers moved the base of their operations to Ludhiana. In 1956, they moved from component manufacturing to complete bicycle manufacturing with the brand name Hero, the first bicycle manufacturing unit in India, producing 639 bicycles in the first year. Mr. Munjal died on 13 August 2015.

== Hero Cycles ==
Om started Hero Cycles with a capital of Rs.50,000 in 1956 raised as a bank loan. The rise of the company attracted indigenous talent in the form of skilled engineers, technocrats, administrators and entrepreneurs who helped in building an ancillary industry around the bicycle industry. The then chief minister of the Punjab state, Pratap Singh Kairon motivated Om and his brothers to set up and run their business. They acknowledge Kairon as being immensely helpful for their beginning.

In the 1980s, Hero Cycles became the largest bicycle manufacturer in the world and was registered with Guinness Book of World Records in 1986 for this feat. Hero Cycles today produces around 19000 bicycles per day.

Om and his brothers expanded the Hero Group in various businesses, diversifying into sectors like bicycle components, automotive, automotive components, IT, services etc. Om, his brother Brijmohan and the next generation of the family were instrumental in establishing Hero Honda, now Hero Motocorp, a joint venture between Hero Cycles and Honda for manufacturing motorcycles that went on to become the world's largest motorcycle producer.

In the late 1990s, Om became one of the first to explore the idea of manufacturing electric bicycles in India.

In 2010, Om assumed responsibility of leading Hero Cycles, Hero Motors, Munjal Kiriu Industries, ZF Hero and Munjal Hospitality.

Om continued to serve as the Chairman of Hero Cycles and group companies. He has also served as the president of the All India Cycle Manufacturers’ Association multiple times.

"I believe life is the biggest teacher and world is the biggest school. I learnt from my mistakes and crisis. There has hardly been a day when I have not learnt something," - Late O.P. Munjal.

== Personal life ==
Om was married to Sudarshan Munjal and had five children - Neeru Khanna, Neeta Seth, Poonam Soni, Priyanka Malhotra and Pankaj Munjal.

Munjal was known for cultural and literary activities and for patronizing upcoming talents in these fields. He was also known as a promoter of Urdu language through his Shers and Mushairas published in journals, magazines and company's annual diaries. Om's biography was written by Indian writer Priya Kumar under the title The Inspiring Journey of A Hero . It was published by Penguin Books in 2014.

== Awards and honors ==
Om has received recognition and honors from the former Presidents of India Sarvepalli Radhakrishnan, V. V. Giri, Zail Singh and A. P. J. Abdul Kalam. He received the Udyog Rattan Award from Amrinder Singh for outstanding contribution towards economic development of the State (Punjab).

Om also received the Samman Patra award for the contribution to exchequer of the state government, the Indira Gandhi National Unity award to recognize his social contribution and the Punjab Rattna award to commemorate his contribution to the state economy.
