= Ron Coe =

English cyclist (1933–1988)

Personal information
- Full name: Ronald Coe
- Born: January 29, 1933 England; United Kingdom
- Died: March 5, 1988 (aged 55)

Cycling career
- Sport: Cycling
- Discipline: Road
- Role: Rider

Professional teams
- 1957: Wilson Cycles (GB)
- 1958: Splendor (BEL)
- 1958–1959: Elswick Hopper (GB)
- 1958: Bertin - The Dura (BEL)
- 1960: Bertin - The Dura - Milremo (FRA)
- 1961: Bertin - l'Avenir - Milremo (FRA)
- 1962: Margnat - Paloma (FRA)
- 1966: Viking - Trumann's Steel

Ron Coe (born 29 January 1933 – 5 March 1988) was an English professional cyclist from Barnsley and a multiple British National Road Race Champion.

== Palmarès ==
1957
1st British National Road Race Championships (BLRC Independent Road Race)
1st Lincoln Grand Prix
1st Tour of the Lakes

1st Stage 3, Tour of the Lakes

1958
1st British National Road Race Championships (BLRC Independent Road Race)
1st Lincoln Grand Prix
3rd Stage 2a, Tour du Var, Frejus (FRA)
1st Stage 3, Milk Race, Scarborough
1st Stage 7, Milk Race, Llandrindod
1st Stage 8, Milk Race, Weston
1st Stage 11, Milk Race, Bournemouth
2nd Stage 12, Milk Race, Thames Ditton

1959
1st British National Road Race Championships (Professional)
1st Lincoln Grand Prix
1st Archer International Grand Prix
1st Stage 2, Milk Race, Scarborough
1st Stage 5, Milk Race, Blackpool
2nd Stage 6, Milk Race, Rhyl
