= Brijmohan Lall Munjal =

Indian businessman

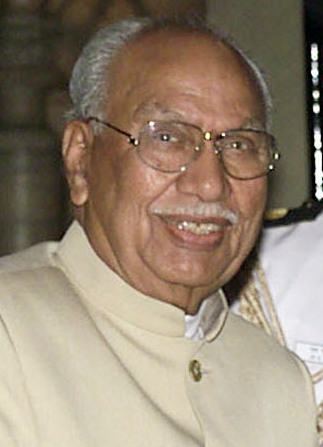
- Munjal in 2005
- Born: 1 July 1923; Kamalia, Punjab, British India
- Died: 1 November 2015 (aged 92); New Delhi, India
- Occupations: Businessman; Investor
- Known for: Founder and Chairman of Hero Motors Company
- Spouse: Santosh Munjal
- Children: Pawan Munjal, Sunil Kant Munjal, Suman Kant Munjal, Raman Kant Munjal, Geeta Anand
- Parent(s): Bahadur Chand Munjal (Father); Thakur Devi Munjal (Mother)
- Awards: Padma Bhushan (2005)

Brijmohan Lall Munjal (1 July 1923 – 1 November 2015) was an Indian entrepreneur and the founder of Hero Group.

== Early life ==
Munjal was born on 1 July 1923 in Kamalia, undivided India, which is located in the Toba Tek Singh District of present-day Punjab, Pakistan. He came to Amritsar from Kamalia in 1944 at the age of 20 with his three brothers, Dayanand, Satyanand and Om Prakash. He started his career working in the Indian Ordnance Factories.

== Merchant and industrialist ==
Once in Amritsar, Munjal and his brothers started a bicycle parts business. They later moved to Ludhiana, where in 1954, he founded Hero Cycles Limited and began making bicycle parts, starting with forks and then adding handles and other parts.

In 1956, the Punjab government issued a license to manufacture bicycles. His company got this license and from here his world changed. With the financial support of Rs 6 lakh from the government and its own capital, Hero Cycles forayed into bicycle manufacturing by getting the status of "Large Scale Unit". The company had an annual production capacity of 7,500 cycles at that time. By 1975 it had become the largest bicycle company in India and in 1986, Hero Cycles was entered in the Guinness Book as the world's largest bicycle company.

=== Hero Honda ===
After the bicycle company, he opened a two-wheeler company named Hero Majestic Company. In this, he started making Majestic scooters and mopeds. In 1984, he signed a deal with Japan's big auto company Honda and from here his world changed again. Together with Honda, he set up a plant in Dharuhera, Haryana. On 13 April 1985, Hero Honda's first bike CD 100 came on the market. The Hero Group made such progress that by 2002, 8.6 million Hero Honda motorcycles had been sold and 16,000 motorcycles were being produced daily.

=== Hero MotoCorp ===
In August 2011, after exiting the joint venture with Honda Motors, the company was renamed Hero MotoCorp, and the Hero Group decided to pay royalties to Honda Company in order to use the Hero Honda brand by 2013. The Hero Group was then able to export to countries where Honda already had business and Hero-Honda joint venture had not been allowed to sell goods.

== Personal life ==
Brijmohan was married to Santosh and they have four sons (including Pawan and Sunil) and a daughter. He died on 1 November 2015.

== Awards ==
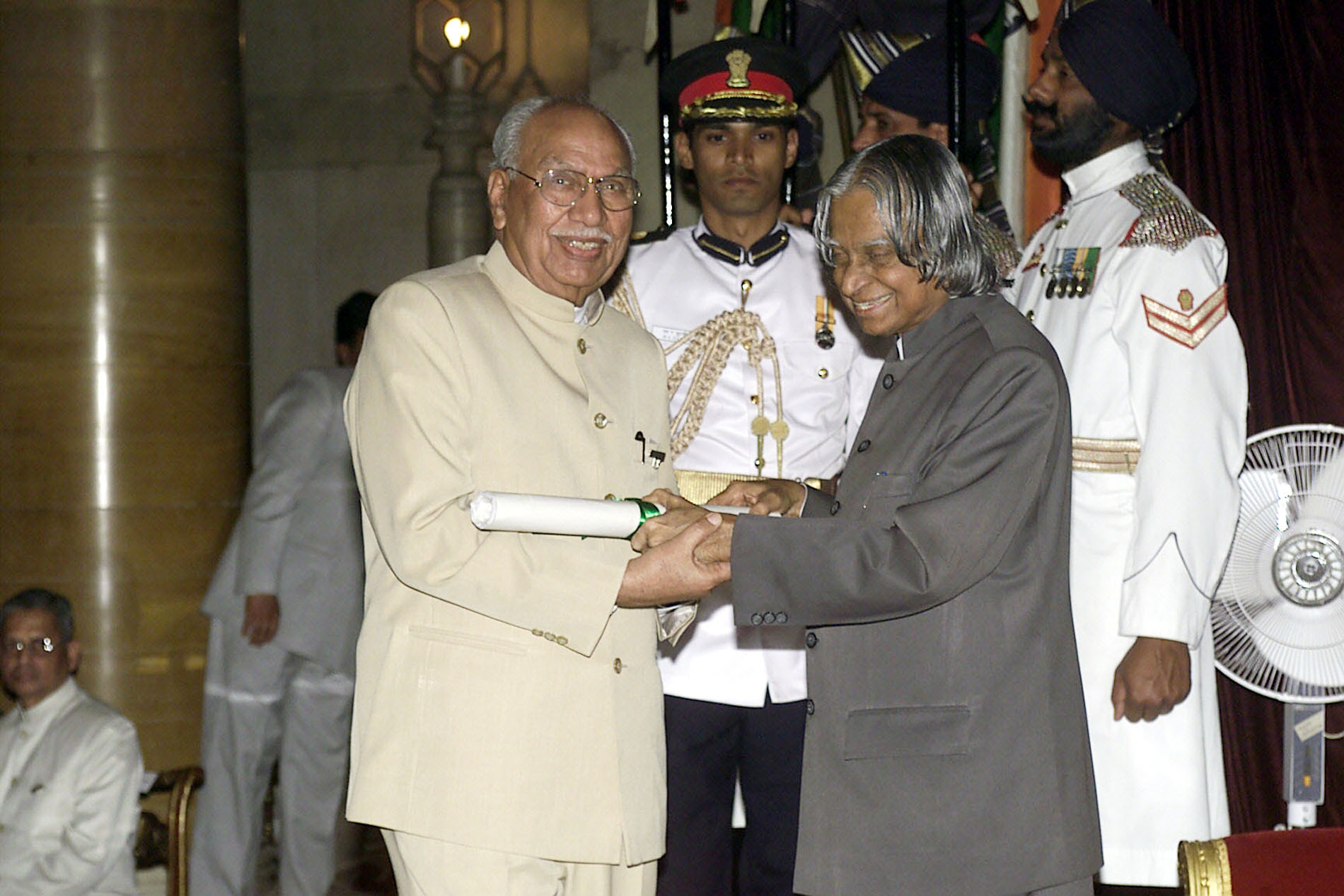
Brijmohan Lall Munjal (left) receiving the Padma Bhushan award from A. P. J. Abdul Kalam in 2005

Brijmohan Lal Munjal was awarded the Padma Bhushan by the Government of India in 2005 in the field of industry and trade. Other major honors he has received include:

- Lifetime Contribution Award by All India Management Association in 2011
- The Forbes India Leadership Award for Lifetime Achievement in 2014
