= Sunil Kant Munjal =

Businessman from India

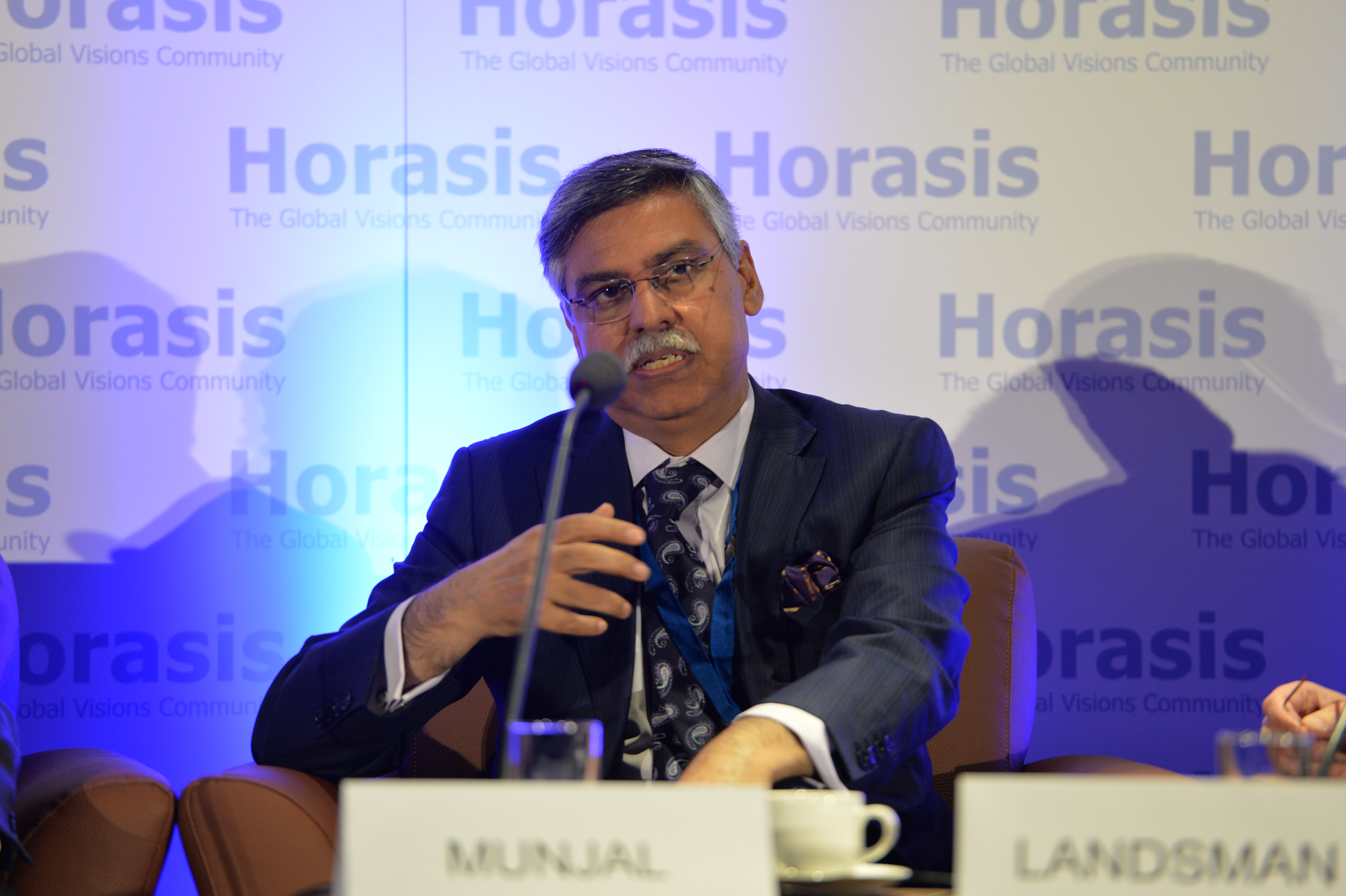
- Born: 14 December 1957 (age 68)
- Education: Doon School
- Occupation: Businessman
- Spouse: Late Mukta Munjal
- Children: Shefali Munjal

Sunil Kant Munjal (born 14 December 1957) is an Indian businessman and the chairman of Hero Enterprise. He is the founder of India's Serendipity Arts Festival, and chairman of the board of governors of The Doon School. He is the youngest son of Brijmohan Lall Munjal. In 2014, Munjal founded the BML Munjal University and is its chancellor.
