= Steve Lawrence (cyclist) =

British cyclist

Personal information
- Nationality: England
- Born: 24 September 1955 (age 70) Lincolnshire
Medal record
Cycling
Representing England
Commonwealth Games
Gold medal – first place	1982 Brisbane	team time trial

Steve Lawrence (born 1955) is a male retired British cyclist.

== Cycling career ==
He represented England in the road race, at the 1978 Commonwealth Games in Edmonton, Alberta, Canada. Four years later he represented England in the road race and team time trial, at the 1982 Commonwealth Games in Brisbane, Queensland, Australia. He finished just outside the medals in fourth place in the road race but won a gold medal in the team time trial with Joseph Waugh, Malcolm Elliott and Bob Downs.

Lawrence was a two times National Champion in 1977 and 1980.
