= Alexandar Richardson =

British cyclist

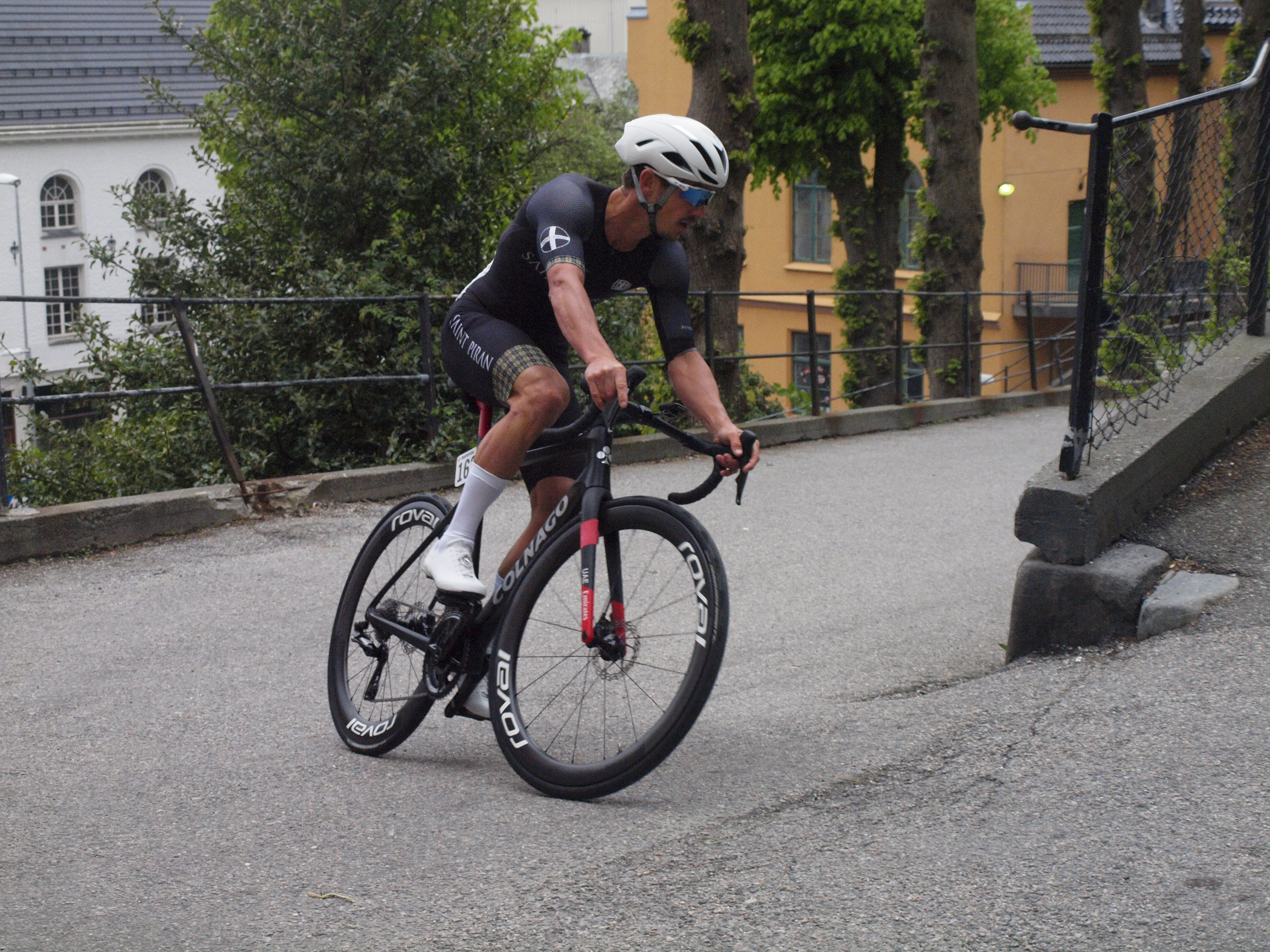
- Richardson at the 2023 Tour of Norway

Personal information
- Full name: Alexandar John Richardson
- Born: 30 April 1990 (age 36)

Cycling career
- Sport: Cycling
- Current team: Retired
- Discipline: Road
- Role: Rider

Amateur teams
- 2016: Pedal Heaven Academy
- 2022: Le Col

Professional teams
- 2017: Bike Channel–Canyon
- 2018: ONE Pro Cycling
- 2019: Canyon dhb p/b Bloor Homes
- 2020–2021: Alpecin–Fenix
- 2022–2024: Saint Piran

Alexandar John Richardson (born 30 April 1990) is a British former cyclist, who competed as a professional from 2017 until June 2024.

A former stockbroker, Richardson began cycling during mid-2015, and took a surprise solo win in the 2018 Lincoln Grand Prix, a couple of weeks after leaving the ONE Pro Cycling team. In 2019, Richardson rejoined the Canyon dhb p/b Bloor Homes team he had competed for in 2017, and won the Arno Wallaard Memorial and a stage of the Tour de la Mirabelle. For 2020, he joined the Alpecin–Fenix team.

In October 2021 Richardson was subjected to an armed robbery. He was training in Richmond Park when he was set upon by motorcyclists with a machete who stole his bike.

== Major results ==
2018
1st Lincoln Grand Prix
2019
1st Arno Wallaard Memorial
1st Omloop van het Waasland
1st Puivelde Koerse
1st Zwevezele Koers
1st Stage 3 Tour de la Mirabelle
6th Ronde van Overijssel
2021
4th Marathon, National Mountain Bike Championships
2022
1st Grand Prix de la ville de Nogent-sur-Oise
1st Ryedale Grasscrete Grand Prix
2nd Beaumont Trophy
3rd Road race, National Road Championships
5th Lincoln Grand Prix
2023
1st Lincoln Grand Prix
1st PNE Road Race
2nd Timmy James Memorial Grand Prix
2024
1st PNE Road Race
1st Timmy James Memorial Grand Prix
