= Hero Motors =

Former Indian moped and scooter manufacturer

- Type: Private
- Industry: Automotive
- Founded: 1960s
- Fate: Transformed into electric two-wheeler and auto parts manufacturer
- Headquarters: Delhi, India
- Area served: India
- Products: Mopeds, scooters, motorcycle parts, electric two-wheelers
- Parent: Hero Motors Company

Hero Motors is a former moped and scooter manufacturer based in Delhi, India. It is a part of multinational company Hero Motors Company, which also currently owns Hero Motocorp (formerly Hero Honda) and Hero Cycles, among others. Hero Motors was started in the 1960s to manufacture 50 cc two-stroke mopeds but gradually diversified into making larger mopeds, mokicks and scooters in the 1980s and the 1990s. Noteworthy collaborators and technical partners were Puch of Austria and Malaguti of Italy manufacturing Puch Maxi Plus and Malaguti Centro respectively in India with updated engines.

Due to tightening emission regulations and poor sales, Hero motors has transferred the manufacture of all gasoline-powered vehicles to Hero Motocorp and transformed itself into an electric two-wheeler and auto parts manufacturer.

== Brands ==
- Hero Motors (also known as Hero Motors’ Gear & Transmissions) – produces gearboxes, ATV-sub transmissions, primary drive assemblies for motorcycles, transmission gear assemblies for motorcycles, balance shaft assemblies for marine and snowmobile engines, and starter gear and oil pump gear assemblies for the automotive industry.
- Hero Motorcorp – New Delhi based motorcycle, ATV, moped and scooter manufacturer.
- Hero Cycles – The Largest manufacturer of bicycles in India. In addition to Hero branded bicycles, Hero also produces the following "premium brands": Hero Sprint (mountain bikes), Octane (mountain bikes), Disney (children's bikes), Miss India (women's bikes), UT and Firefox bikes
