= Serendipity Arts Festival =

Annual arts festival in Panaji, Goa

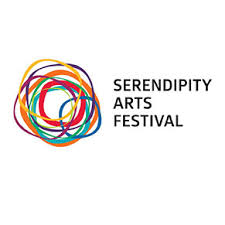
- Genre: Arts Festival
- Dates: December (annually)
- Locations: Goa, India
- Founded: 2016
- Attendance: 450,000
- Patrons: Hero Enterprise, Sunil Kant Munjal
- Website: Serendipity Arts Festival

Serendipity Arts Festival is an annual arts festival held in Panaji, Goa over a week in late December. It was founded in 2016 by Sunil Kant Munjal, chairman of Hero Enterprise. It is the only arts festival in the country whose programming spans multi-disciplinary fields such as art, theatre, music, literature, dance, food and crafts. The festival's inter-disciplinary approach has been reported in Indian media, along with its impact on "India's art scene".

The festival received 450,000 visitors in 2018. For the 2019 edition, the festival took over 12 venues, including some of the heritage structures along the Mandovi river, and featured over 95 projects, including workshops, live performances and art exhibitions.

The festival is organised by the non-profit Serendipity Arts Foundation. Every edition is programmed by a new curatorial team, which includes established figures in particular fields; in 2019, the visual arts programming was curated by artists Jyotindra Jain and Sudarshan Shetty, culinary arts by chef Rahul Akerkar, dance by Mayuri Upadhya, music by Sneha Khanwalkar, among others.
