= Albert Hitchen =

English cyclist

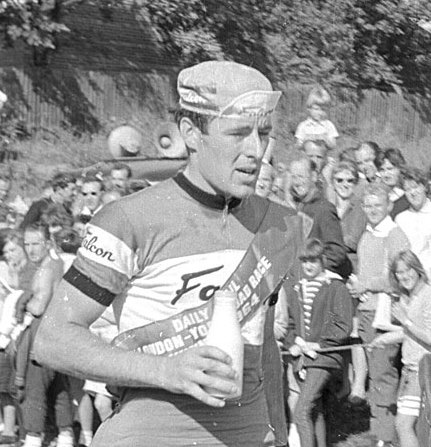
- Albert Hitchen after winning the 1964 Edition of London-York

Personal information
- Full name: Albert Reginald Hitchen
- Nicknames: King Albert and Albert the Dominator
- Born: 4 July 1938 Mirfield, England
- Died: 13 May 2015 (Age 76) Mirfield, England

Cycling career
- Sport: Cycling
- Discipline: Road Track Cyclo-Cross
- Role: Rider
- Rider type: Sprinter

Professional teams
- 1959: Ellis Briggs Cycles
- 1960-1963: Viking Cycles
- 1964: Bertin - Porter 39 - Milremo
- 1965: Falcon
- 1966-1967: Willem II - Gazelle
- 1966: Mottram Cycles - Simplex
- 1966: Broadhurst - Milremo
- 1966: Bertin - Porter 39
- 1968-1970: Falcon
- 1971-1972: Falcon - Tighe

Major wins
- National Championships National Road Race Championships (1963, 1965) One-day races and Classics London - York (1963, 1964)

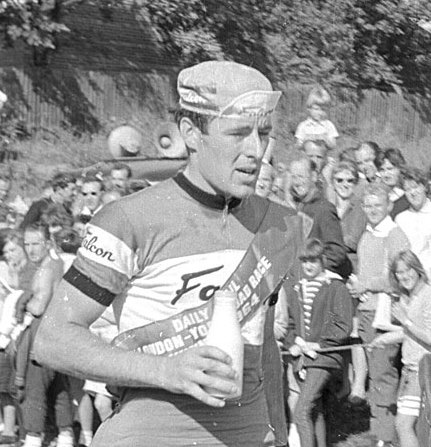
Albert Hitchen - 1964 London-York (11210725135) (cropped)

Albert Reginald Hitchen (1938 – 13 May 2015) was an English professional road racing cyclist, who had also trained as an engineer with British Railways, becoming later known for his work in the preservation of steam locomotives.

== Cycling ==
Raised in Mirfield, West Yorkshire, Hitchen was a keen cyclist from his boyhood, winning the Yorkshire Junior Championship aged 16. He then toured East Germany the following year, sponsored by the Corona (soft drink) brand.

First racing as a semi professional from 1959, he turned professional in 1967, and retired in 1973. During this period he recorded 30 victories, including the UK national title in 1963 and 1965, as well as two Lincoln Grand Prix victories. In 1963 Hitchen made his one and only appearance in the Tour de France, with a best finish of 41st on stage 1a before withdrawing after stage three.

The majority of his cycling career was spent with Viking Cycles, with whom he won two editions of the 275-mile London-Holyhead race, and Falcon Cycles for the final five years. During this time frame he was known as "King Albert" thanks to his cycling success.

After his retirement from professional cycling, he was appointed the racing team manager of the Falcon Sales Team.

== Major results ==
1960
1st Overall Corona - Tour of the South West

1st Stages 1 & 3

1st Sheffield - Newark - Sheffield
1961
1st London - Holyhead
1st Nottingham - Skegness
1st Sheffield - Newark - Sheffield
1962
1st Overall Corona - Tour of the South West

1st Stage 3
2nd Stage 2

1st Bath - London
1963
1st Corona - Tour of the South West

1st Stages 3 & 5

1st Points Classification Huddersfield R.C. - Hammonds Prize Medal Two Day

3rd Stage 3

1st Lincoln Grand Prix
1st London - York
1st Road race
1964
1st Lincoln Grand Prix
1st London - York
1st London - Holyhead
1st Golden Wheel Trophy
1st Merseyside Easter Four Day
1965
1st Golden Wheel Trophy
1st Skelmersdale Reporter Two Day
1st Huntsman Ales - Easter Four Day

1st Stages 1 & 2

1st Tour of East Anglia
1st Road race
1970
1st Mountain Classification Tour of the Isle of Wight

== Railway career ==
Whilst working his way up towards a professional cycling career, from school Hitchen joined British Railways to work on steam locomotives in Mirfield for 18 months, followed by a further 12 months at Wakefield's shed, and then six months at Bradford Hammerton Street. He finished his service with British Railways (BR) in 1952 as a fitter at Mirfield where he worked for the previous 36 months. After leaving BR, and during his semi-professional cycle racing career, Hitchen spent three years looking after Barclay tanks and fireless locomotives at ICI's Dalton works in Huddersfield.

After retiring from professional cycling, Hitchen returned to BR, initially working at Ravensthorpe MPD.

== Railway preservation ==
In 1980, Hitchen bought Bulleid West Country Pacific No.34027 "Taw Valley" for preservation from Woodham Brothers scrapyard. Moved to the North Yorkshire Moors Railway for restoration, but as very little progress was being made on the project the decision was made to move the locomotive to the East Lancashire Railway where it arrived in November 1982. A further move was made to the Severn Valley Railway in November 1985 and restoration was completed in 1987. After mainline certification, she was based at Stewarts Lane alongside SR Merchant Navy No.35028 "Clan Line" and operated the VSOE British Pullman alongside other charter trains.

After selling No.34027 in 2001 to Phil Swallow, Hitchen became a quarter-owner of BR Standard 4 4-6-0 no 75014. Based at Grosmont, the 4-6-0 became a regular on charter train duties, working the first season of the Jacobite along the West Highland Line from Fort William to Mallaig in 1995. Hitchen sold No.75014 to the Dartmouth Steam Railway in 2002.

Hitchen's last locomotive was LMS Black Five 4-6-0 no 45231 The Sherwood Forester. After completion of an overhaul at Loughborough on the Great Central Railway, she moved to the Watercress Line in 2005 for running-in. After a proving run to Fratton that year, she entered mainline service. During Hitchen's ownership, she worked the 40th & 45th anniversary trains of 1T57 (Fifteen Guinea Special), in double headed formation with sister engines 45407 & 44932. Bert could often be seen travelling with 45231 out on-board railtours as part of the support crew travelling behind his black 5 to locations around the north of England including trips down the famous Settle and Carlisle line, the engine was till Bert's death based at Carnforth MPD. After Bert's death she was sold by the Hitchen family in November 2015 to Jeremy Hosking.

== Personal life ==
Hitchen died of heart failure at home in Mirfield on 13 May 2015, aged 76.
