= Hero Motors Company =

Indian bike and bicycle manufacturer

- Type: Private
- Founded: 2007; 19 years ago
- Headquarters: Gurugram, Haryana, India
- Key people: Pankaj M Munjal
- Products: Bicycles, scooters, motorcycles
- Revenue: ₹26 billion (US$270 million) 2017-2018
- Total assets: ₹76.40 billion (US$790 million) (2017-2018)
- Number of employees: 7610
- Website: hmcgroup.co.in

Hero Motors Company (HMC) is an Indian multinational business conglomerate controlled by Pankaj M Munjal. The HMC family is made up of organisations such as Hero Cycles, Avocet Sports (UK), BSH (Sri Lanka), Firefox, Spur, HGD, Hero Motors, Munjal Hospitality, Munjal Kiriu, ZF Hero and OMA.

== Plants ==
- Hero Cycles, Ludhiana, Punjab
- Hero Cycles, Ghaziabad, Uttar Pradesh
- Hero Cycles, Bihta, Bihar
- BSH Ventures Pvt. Ltd., Sri Lanka
- ZF HERO Chassis Systems, Pune, Maharashtra
- ZF HERO Chassis Systems, Chennai, Tamil Nadu
- Munjal Kiriu, Manesar, Haryana
- Munjal Kiriu, Ahmedabad, Gujarat

== See also ==
- Hero MotoCorp
