= SR West Country class 21C127 Taw Valley =

Preserved British 4-6-2 locomotive

SR 21C127 / BR 34027 Taw Valley
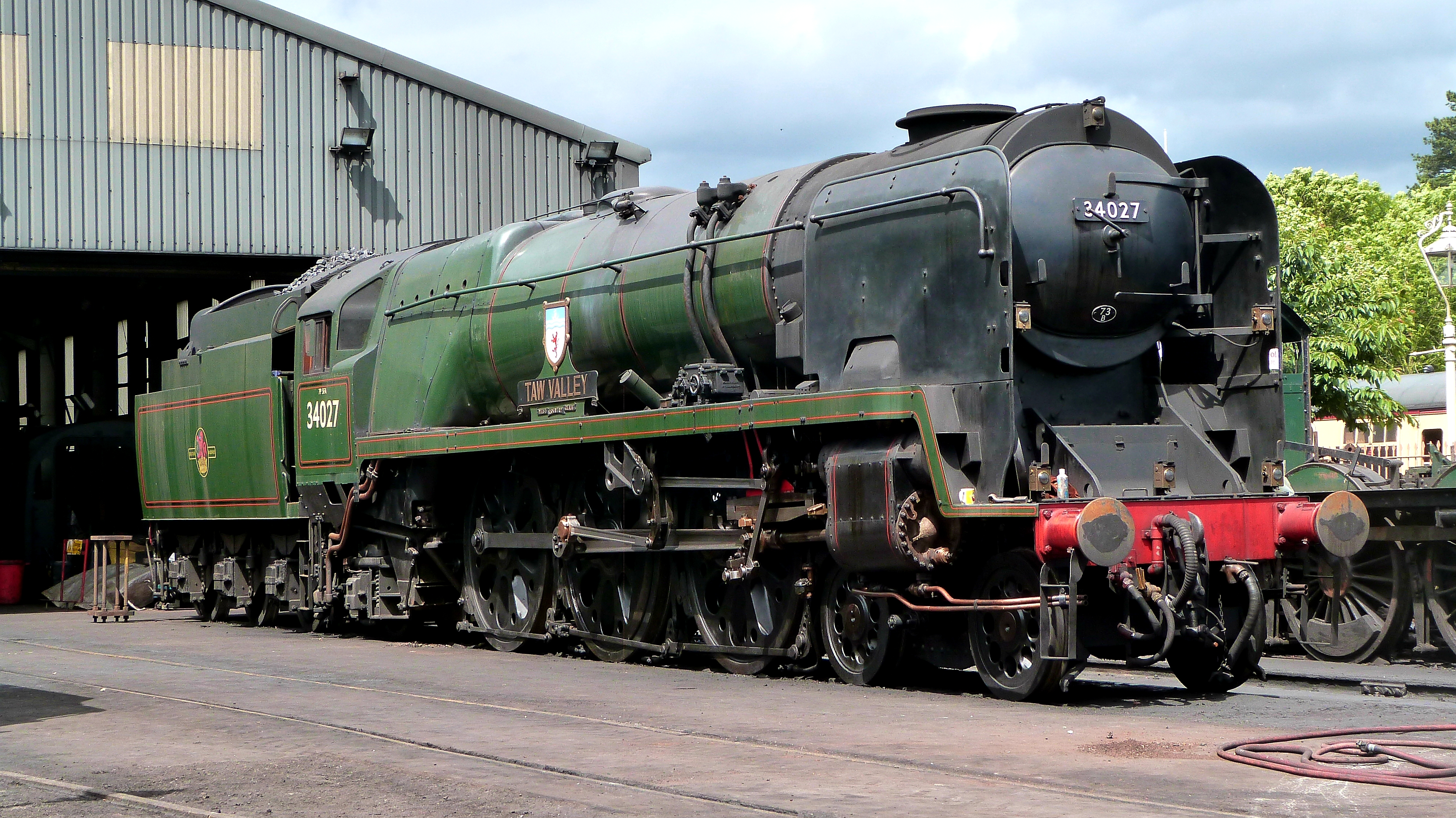
- SR 34027 Taw Valley at Bridgnorth in December 2018
Type and origin
- Power type: Steam
- Designer: Oliver Bulleid
- Builder: Brighton Works
- Build date: April 1946
- Rebuild date: September 1957
Specifications
- Configuration
  - Whyte: 4-6-2
- Leading dia.: 3 ft 1 in (0.940 m)
- Driver dia.: 6 ft 2 in (1.880 m)
- Trailing dia.: 3 ft 7 in (1.092 m)
- Length: 67 ft 4.75 in (20.54 m)
- Loco weight: 91.16 long tons (92.6 t)
- Fuel type: Coal
- Water cap.: 5,500 imp gal (25,000 L; 6,610 US gal)
- Boiler pressure: 250 psi (1.72 MPa)
- Cylinders: Three
- Cylinder size: 16.375 in × 24 in (416 mm × 610 mm)
- Loco brake: Vacuum (Air Brakes fitted for incoming charter trains)
Performance figures
- Maximum speed: 25mph - (heritage railways) 75mph - (mainline, restricted) 90mph - (mainline, unrestricted)
- Tractive effort: 31,046 lbf (138.10 kN), later 27,719 lbf (123.30 kN)
Career
- Operators: Southern Railway; British Railways
- Class: West Country
- Numbers: SR: 21C127; BR: 34027
- Official name: Taw Valley
- Delivered: April 1946
- Withdrawn: August 1964
- Restored: October 1987
- Current owner: Phil Swallow
- Disposition: Operational

21C127 Taw Valley is a Southern Railway West Country class 4-6-2 steam locomotive that has been preserved. It is currently under overhaul on the Severn Valley Railway.

== History ==
No. 21C127 was built in April 1946 at the SR's Brighton Works and was named Taw Valley, its name being taken from the River Taw in Devon. She was originally allocated to Ramsgate, followed by Exmouth Junction in 1947. In 1948, when British Railways was formed, she was renumbered from 21C127 to 34027. Taw Valley was rebuilt in 1957, when its casing was removed, into its current shape. It was, shortly after, re-allocated to Bricklayer's Arms, and then Brighton in 1961 and Salisbury in 1963, where she was to remain working for BR until August 1964 when she was withdrawn from service and towed to Barry Scrapyard.

=== Naming ===
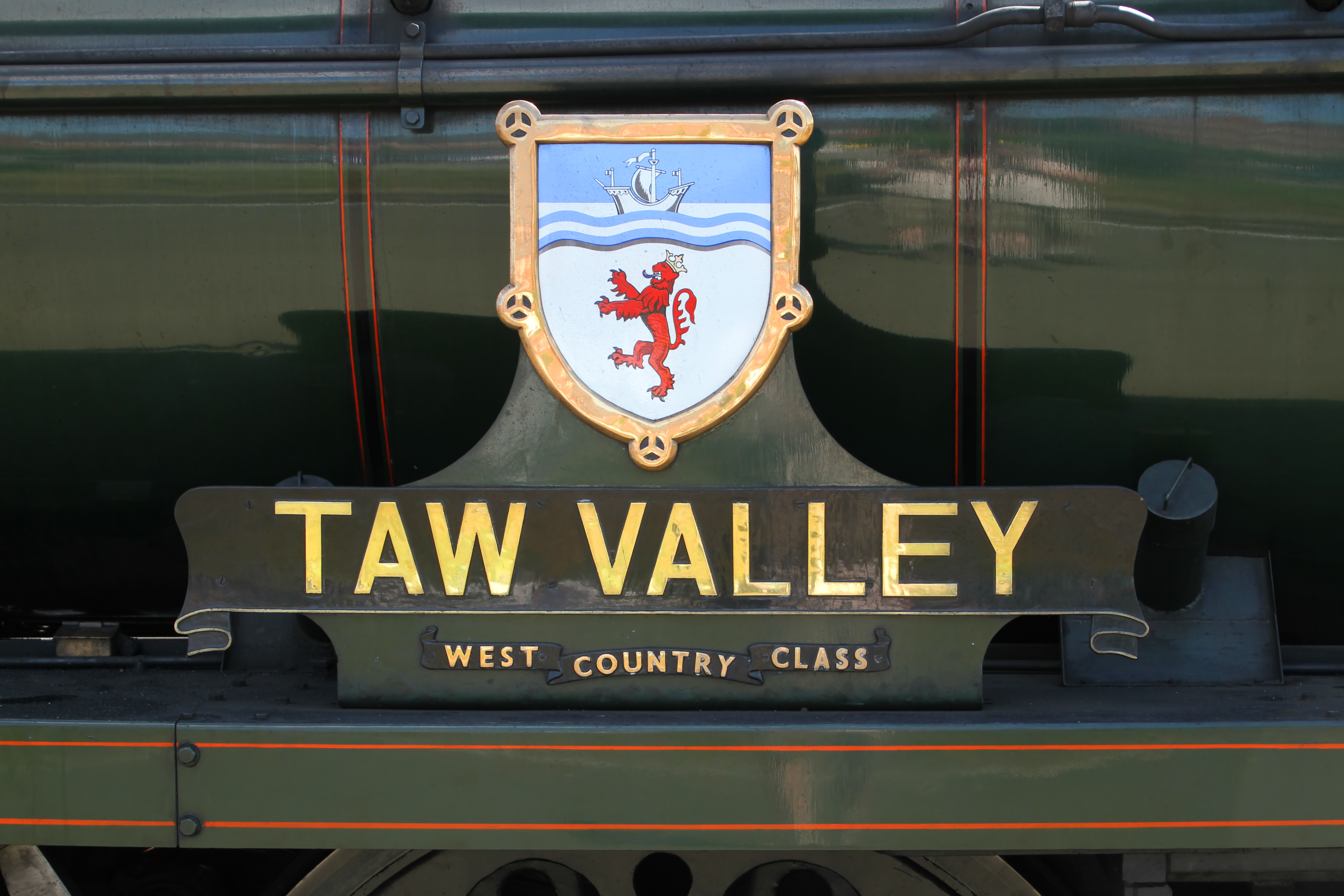
Taw Valley's BR Nameplate, complete with coat of arms.

Taw Valley was named after the valley made by the river that flows through Devon and Dartmoor. It was one of thirty-six "West Country" light pacifics to be named but not have a coat of arms applied during its service days. The coat of arms that she currently wears with her nameplate was added in preservation in 2015, following the completion of an overhaul in the same year.

== Preservation ==
It was rescued for preservation in 1980 by Bert Hitchen and was moved away from Barry Scrapyard on Barry Island to the North Yorkshire Moors Railway, where restoration began. She was later moved to the East Lancashire Railway, and was moved again in August 1985 to the Severn Valley Railway, where restoration continued. After trial runs commencing in October 1987, she entered service on the Severn Valley Railway in June 1988.

=== Return to steam ===
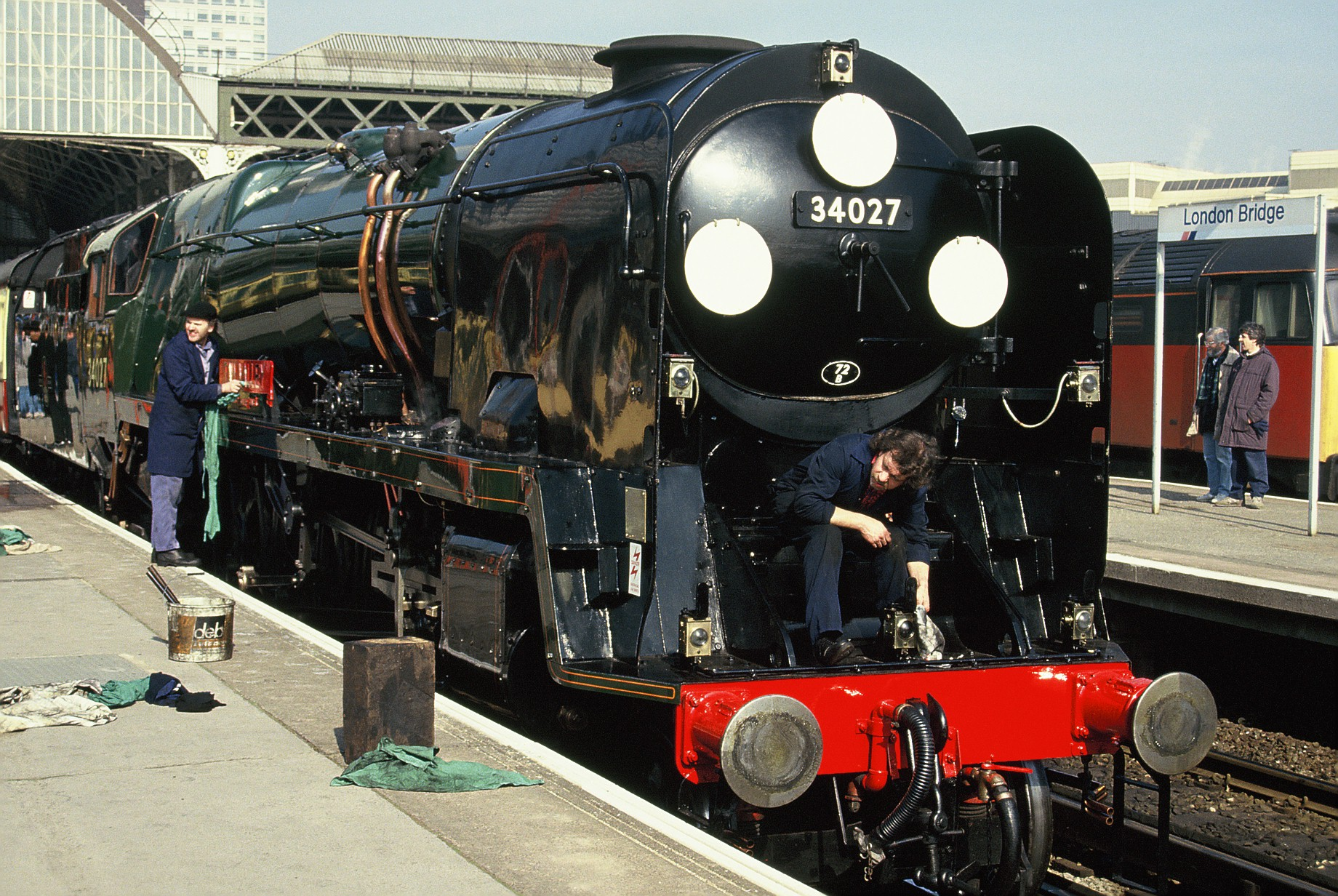
SR 34027 Taw Valley on display at London Bridge in March 1991.

Taw Valley entered service after its restoration with a formal renaming ceremony taking place on 4 June 1988. Alongside its work on the mainline she did put in mileage on the SVR until 1992, when it departed from the Railway. The engine returned to the SVR as a resident in 2001, when its owner Bert Hitchen put her up for sale and she was acquired by SVR member Phil Swallow. Following its withdrawal from the mainline it was disguised as scrapped sister 34036 Westward Ho for an appearance at the SVR's Autumn Steam Gala in 2005. In that same year, the engine was withdrawn from service requiring a complete overhaul.

Taw Valley's first overhaul after restoration began in the spring of 2006. It required a total rebuild of her boiler, and took 9 years. She was completed and run-in in-time to haul an incoming "British Pullman" railtour on 16 May 2015 from Bewdley to Bridgnorth.

=== Queen's Platinum Jubilee ===
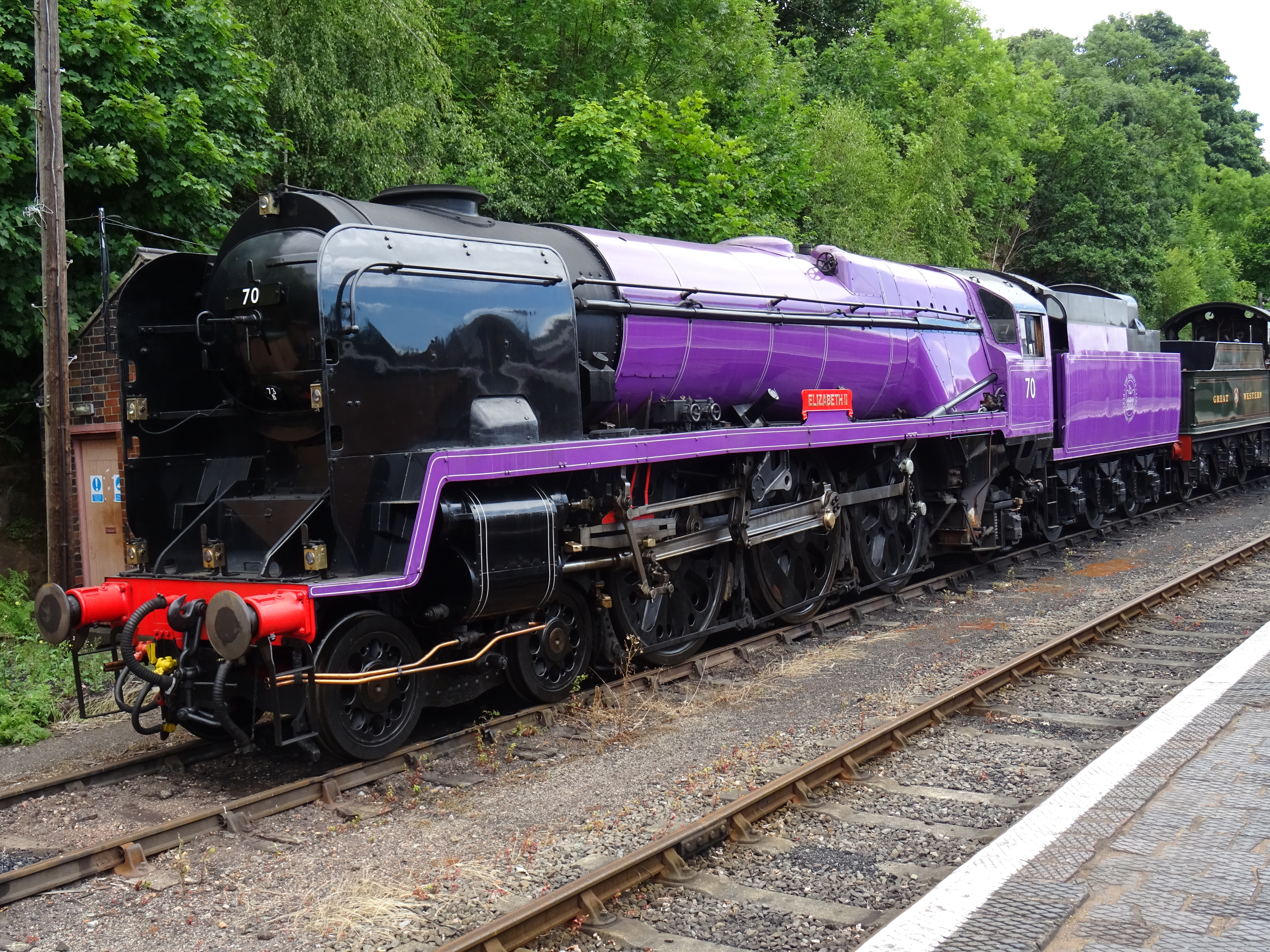
Taw Valley in its Platinum Jubilee Purple livery in July 2022.

In Early 2022, the engine was temporarily repainted from BR Lined Green with late crest into lined purple livery with the number 70 and renamed Elizabeth II for the Queens Platinum Jubilee celebrations in June 2022. Alongside replacing its 34027 number with '70', the engine also had its nameplates changed to Elizabeth II. It had been intended to repaint the engine back into BR lined green by September 2022, but following the death of Elizabeth II on 8 Sept 2022 the repaint was delayed. When outshopped, the engine originally wore red backed nameplates, these were changed to black following Queen Elizabeth's death with the addition of 1926 - 2022 beneath to honour the life of the late queen.

The engine wore this livery until 2023, but reverted to wearing its own Taw Valley nameplates and its 34027 number that year. With the engine planned to be withdrawn in autumn 2023 for an intermediate overhaul, instead of returning to its authentic BR lined green livery, she was repainted into Southern wartime black. The engine wore its original Southern number 21C127 and Taw Valley nameplates with Southern lettering on its tender. This is historically inaccurate, however, as the class was rebuilt between 1955 and 1961 and Taw Valley being rebuilt in 1957, none of the rebuilt engines wore Southern Railway colours.

=== Mainline service in preservation ===
While based on SVR, the owner Bert decided to take the engine back out onto the mainline in 1989, and following a test run from Derby to Sheffield it became a regular mainline runner. The engine worked regular tours including "The North Wales Coast Express", "Welsh Marches Express" and "Cumbrian Mountain Express" from 1989 to 1994. Its most famous mainline duties included pulling the Venice-Simplon Orient Express on day trips from London to locations around the former southern region including Portsmouth. During this time she was housed at Stewarts Lane TMD alongside fellow VSOE engine SR Merchant Navy class 35028 Clan Line.

=== Potential appearance on screen ===
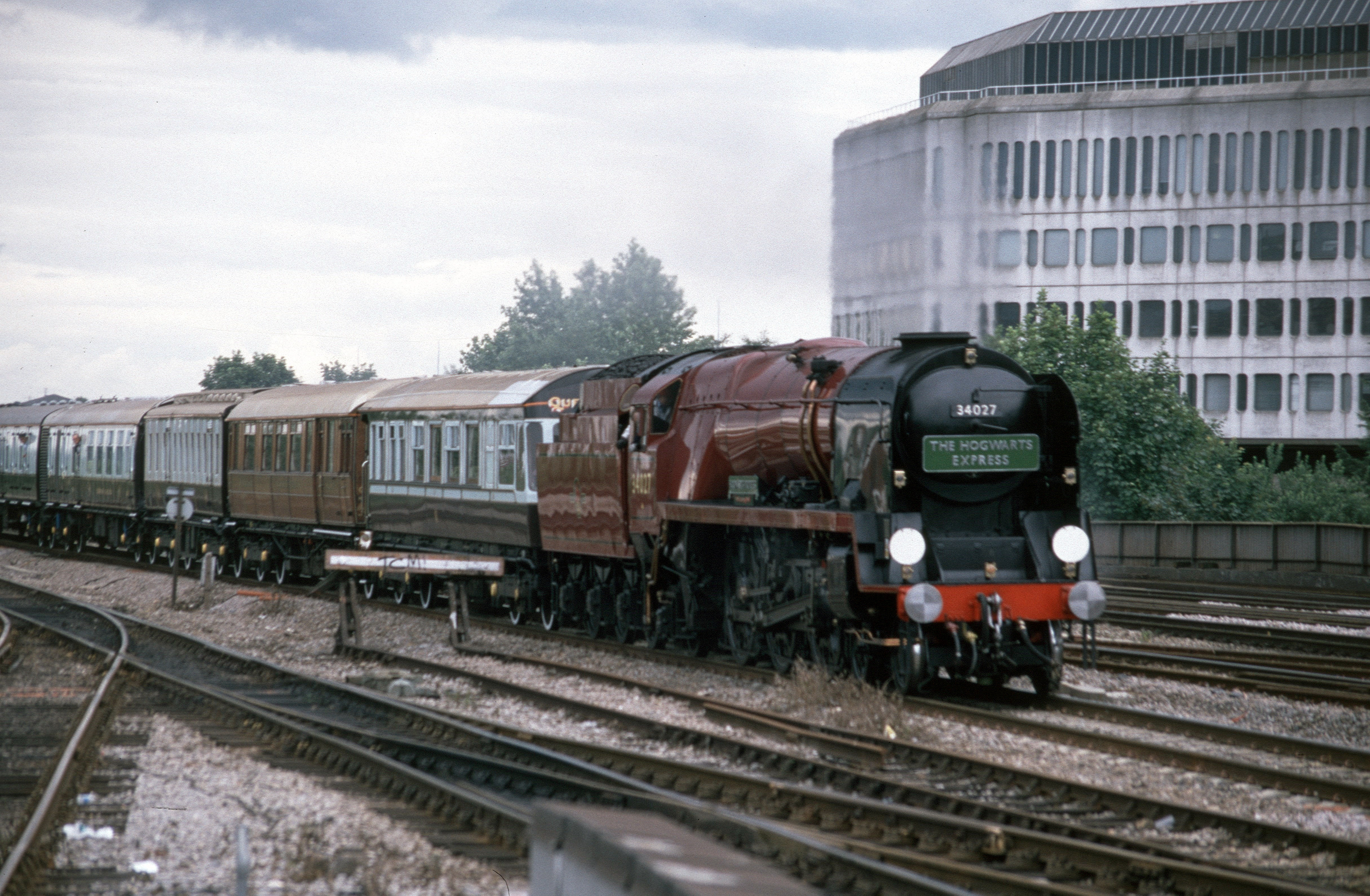
No. 34027 as the Hogwarts Express in July 2000.

Through the 2000s, 34027 was still a regular runner on the mainline and for a brief period was painted maroon with Hogwarts Express nameplates to promote the Harry Potter series. It was suggested that it be used as the locomotive in the first film of the series when it was being worked on, but was rejected by the film's director Chris Columbus as the engine looked too modern. LMS Class 8F No. 48151 was another potential candidate, but eventually, 5972 Olton Hall was chosen instead.

=== 2005 overhaul ===
The engine was then sold by Bert Hitchen to SVR-based member Phil Swallow, and mainline running continued until May 2005, when it was retired from the mainline and shortly afterwards retired for overhaul. During this time it was disguised as scrapped sister engines 34045 Ottery St Mary and 34036 Westward Ho.

=== 2024- Overhaul ===
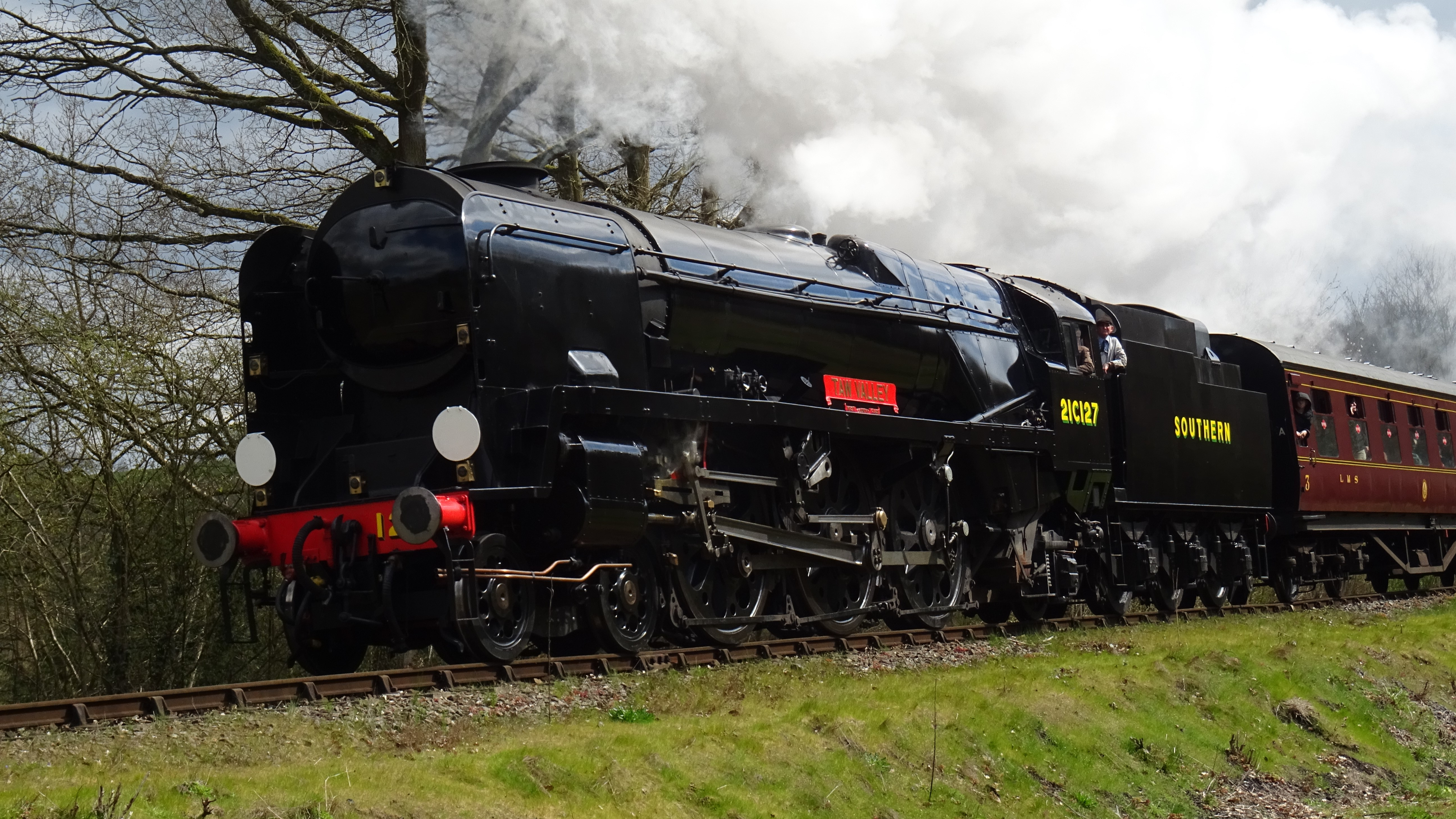
Taw Valley in Southern Wartime Black on the SVR in April 2023.

Taw Valley was withdrawn from the Severn Valley Railway for overhaul in mid-May 2024 after running farewell services between Kidderminster Town and Bridgnorth in Southern Wartime Black. She is currently under intermediate overhaul and was expected to return to steam during 2025.
