= Pawan Munjal =

Indian businessman (born 1956)

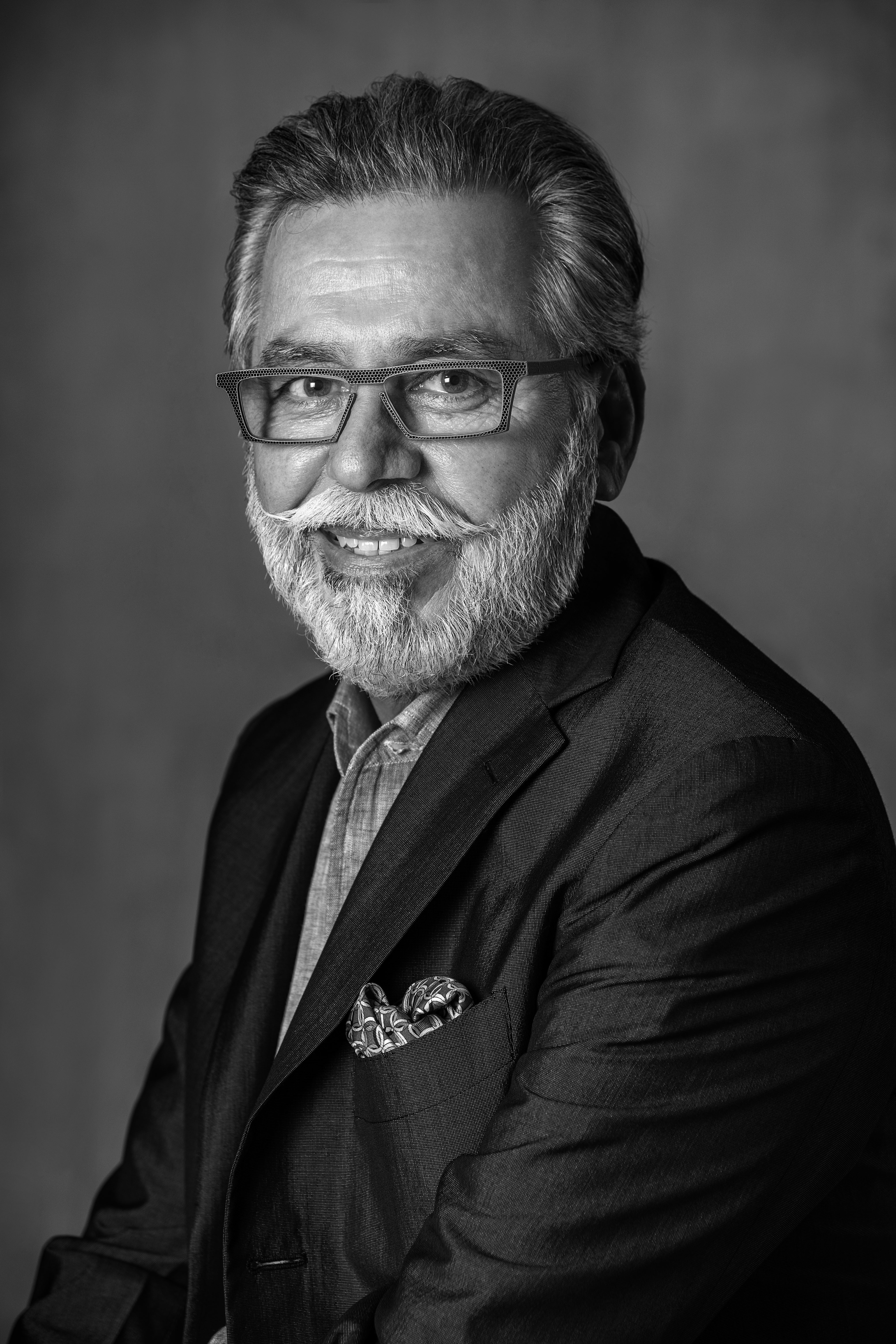
- Born: 1954 (age 71–72)
- Education: National Institute of Technology Kurukshetra
- Occupations: Chairman, MD & CEO, Hero MotoCorp
- Parent: Brijmohan Lall Munjal

Pawan Kant Munjal (born 1954) is an Indian billionaire businessman, and the chairman, managing director and CEO of Hero MotoCorp, the world’s largest manufacturer of motorcycles and scooters. India Today magazine ranked him #49th in its India's 50 Most Powerful People of 2017 list.

He is the third child of Brijmohan Lall Munjal and Santosh Munjal.

As of May 2022, his net worth was estimated at US$3.4 billion.

In August 2023, the Enforcement Directorate (ED) conducted raids at his residence following the Directorate of Revenue Intelligence's (DRI) case.

As per Forbes list of India’s 100 richest tycoons, dated 9 October 2024, Pawan Munjal & family are ranked 47th with a net worth of $6.1 Billion.
