= Pete Smith (cyclist) =

British cyclist (1944–2021)

Personal information
- Born: 1 May 1944 Acomb, North Yorkshire, England
- Died: 26 March 2021 (aged 76) Leeds, West Yorkshire, England

Cycling career
- Sport: Cycling

Pete Smith (1 May 1944 – 26 March 2021) was a British cyclist. He competed in the team time trial at the 1968 Summer Olympics.

Smith was a member of the Clifton Cycling Club in York with whom he won the team title in the British Best All-Rounder competition in 1965, 1966, 1967 and 1969 and broke team competition records at 25, 50 and 100 miles and 12 hours. In individual events, Smith broke the British 50-mile record twice in 1967, the 100-mile record in 1969, and won the mountains classification in the 1968 Tour of Morocco. He rode professionally in the early 1970s for Clive Stuart, TI–Carlton, Falcon–Tighe, Bantel and TI–Raleigh.

Smith died on 26 March 2021, in Leeds General Infirmary following a cycle accident near York.
