= Sidhrawali =

Sidhrawali is a village in pataudi Mandal in Gurgaon District in Haryana State. Sidhrawali is located at a distance of 7.5 km from its Mandal Main Town Pataudi, and 29 km from Gurgaon, its District Main City. It is located 274 km distance from its State Main City Chandigarh . This is a very big village with a population of around 8000 people. It lies near Kundli Manesar expressway and Dharuhera. It has fairly well-developed facilities for education up to the college, M.Ed. and B.Ed. level. Rao Lal Singh College of Education is one of the best colleges in Haryana for scholars pursuing M.Ed. and B.Ed. degrees. Rao Lal Singh Public School and Raman Munjal Public School are also schools in the area for quality education.
