= Hero Cycles =

Indian bicycle company

- Type: Private company
- Industry: Bicycles
- Founded: 1956; 70 years ago
- Founder: Brijmohan Lall Munjal; Om Prakash Munjal; Satyanand Munjal; Dayanand Munjal
- Headquarters: Ludhiana, Punjab, India
- Key people: Pankaj M Munjal
- Products: Bicycles
- Revenue: ₹26 billion (US$270 million) 2017–2018
- Total assets: ₹76.40 billion (US$790 million) (2017–2018)
- Number of employees: 7610
- Parent: Hero Motors Company
- Website: www.herocycles.com

Hero Cycles Limited, based in Ludhiana, Punjab, is an Indian company that manufactures bicycles and bicycle related products. Pankaj M Munjal is the chairman and managing director of Hero Cycles.

== History ==
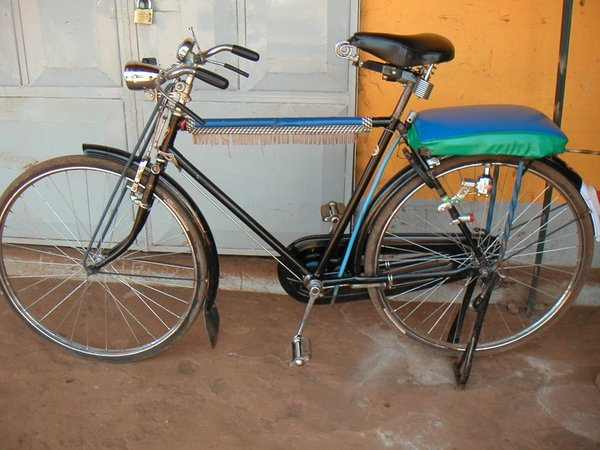
A bike from Hero Cycles, photo taken in Uganda

Hero Cycles was established in 1956 in Ludhiana, Punjab, manufacturing bicycle components. Today, Hero Cycles is one of the world's largest manufacturers of bicycles, producing 18390 cycles per day. Hero Cycles Ltd. is part of Hero Motors Company. In 2016 Hero cycles exported to over 70 countries world-wide. The company is ISO9001 & ISO14001 certified.

The company acts in part as a white label manufacturer to various brands, in addition to selling motorcycles under the Hero and UT (formerly Urbantrail) brands. Hero Cycles bought the Firefox bicycle brand in 2015.

In 2015, Hero Cycles Lt. bought a majority stake in Avocet Sports Ltd., a UK distributor of bicycles, e-bikes, bicycle parts, and accessories. Insync Bikes brand was launched by Avocet in November 2018. In 2019, Hero bought a majority stake in German e-bike manufacturer HNF-Nicolai. In 2016, Hero bought 60% of Sri Lankan bicycle manufacturer BSH Ventures.

In 1986, the Guinness World Records called Hero Cycles the largest bicycle manufacturer in the world. for being the single largest producer of bicycles.

== Group structure ==
Hero Cycles is part of Hero Motors Company (HMC).

The HMC family is made up of organizations such as Hero Cycles Ltd., Avocet Sports (UK), BSH (Sri Lanka), Firefox Bikes (not to be confused with the browser by Mozilla), Spur, HGD, Hero Motors, Munjal Hospitality, Munjal Kiriu, ZF Hero and OMA.

== Plants ==
- Hero Cycles, Ludhiana, Punjab
- Hero Cycles, Ghaziabad, Uttar Pradesh
- Hero Cycles, Bihta, Bihar
- BSH Ventures Pvt. Ltd., Sri Lanka
- ZF HERO Chasis Systems, Pune, Maharashtra
- ZF HERO Chasis Systems, Chennai, Tamil Nadu
- Munjal Kiriu, Manesar, Haryana
- Munjal Kiriu, Ahmedabad, Gujarat

== See also ==
- Hero Motors company
