= Joseph Waugh =

British cyclist (born 1952)

Personal information
- Born: 28 July 1952 (age 74)

Cycling career
- Sport: Cycling
Medal record
Cycling
Representing England
Commonwealth Games
Gold medal – first place	1982 Brisbane	team time trial

Joseph Waugh (born 28 July 1952) is a British former cyclist. He competed at the 1976 Summer Olympics and the 1980 Summer Olympics. He also represented England and won a gold medal in the team time trial, at the 1982 Commonwealth Games in Brisbane, Queensland, Australia.

== Early life ==
He lived on Imeary Street in South Shields. He attended South Shields Grammar-Technical School for Boys. He had a twin brother John. He married Paula in 1979.

He was hit by a Ford Cortina at the junction of Tynemouth Road and Brandling Terrace on Tuesday 3 May 1983 at 10.30pm. On Thursday 14 June 1984, a 39 year old taxi driver from Jesmond was banned from driving for five years, after found with 207 mg of alcohol.
