= Pankaj M Munjal =

Indian businessman

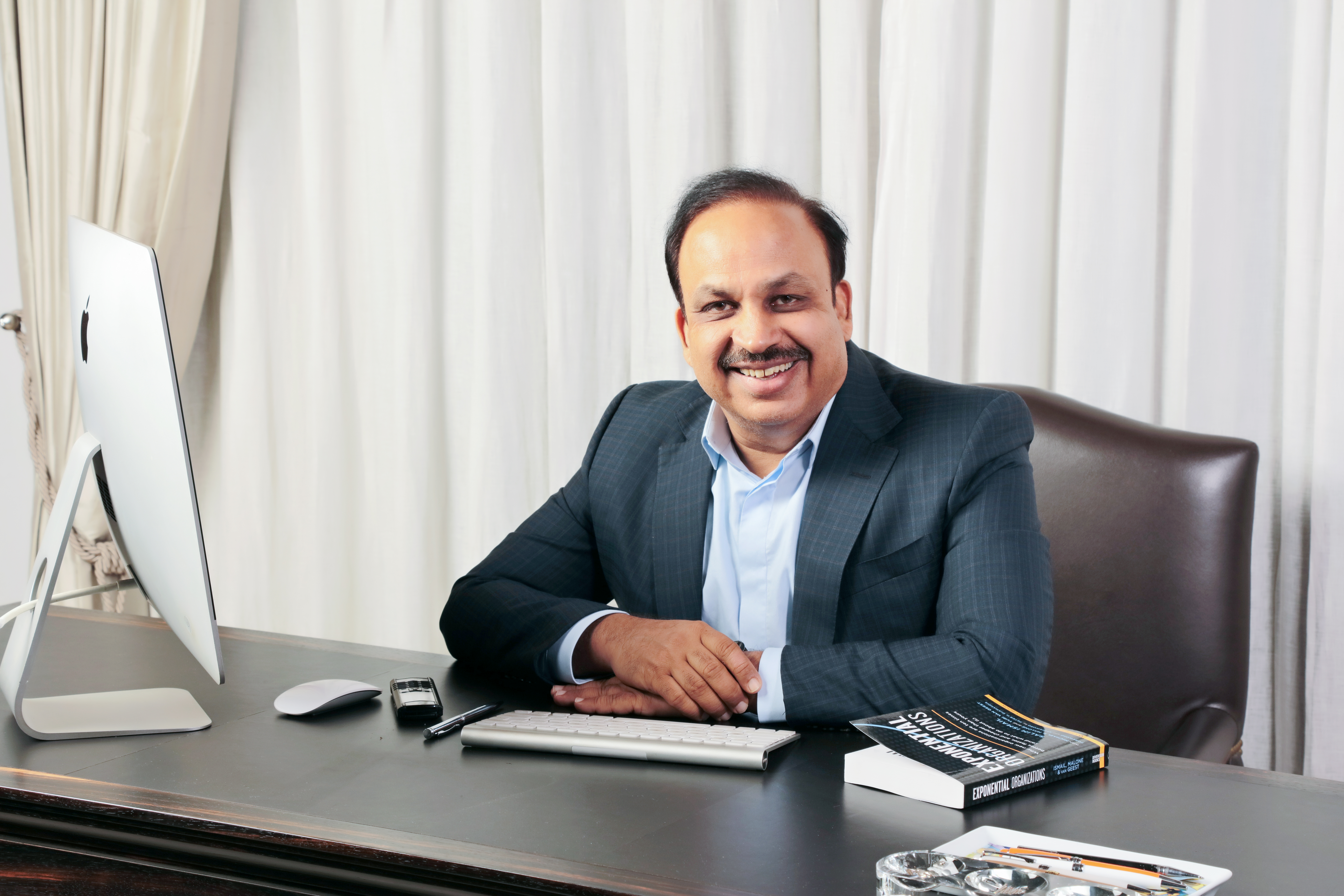
- Born: Pankaj M Munjal; Ludhiana
- Education: The Lawrence School, Sanawar
- Occupations: Chairman and managing director of Hero Cycles Ltd
- Spouse: Charu Munjal
- Parents: Late Sri Om Prakash Munjal (father); Late Smt Sudarshan Munjal (mother)

Pankaj M Munjal (born 15 December 1962) is an Indian businessman, and chairman and managing director of Hero Cycles Limited, based in Punjab, India, taking over the company from his father in 2015.

== Early life and education ==
Born into the family of the Munjals, the founders of the Hero Group, Mr. Pankaj M Munjal has always had a love for automobiles. Pankaj M Munjal is the son of late Om Prakash Munjal, founder of Hero Cycles. He finished his early schooling from The Lawrence School, Sanawar, and graduated in Science and training in Automotive Manufacturing at Kettering University (formerly General Motors Institute), Flint in USA. Thereon, he also attended an executive program in Strategic Marketing Management at London Business School & Harvard University.

== Career ==
Munjal joined his father's company in 1988 and became Co-chairman and managing director in 2011. Munjal took over the executive responsibilities of Hero Cycles Ltd in 2010 after the Munjal family realigned its businesses. He became chairman and managing director at Hero Motors Limited in July 2015.

In addition to directorships at Hero Cycles, Munjal has been a non-executive director at Munjal Showa Limited since May 16, 1985.

Pankaj M Munjal took over the executive responsibilities of Hero Cycles Ltd in 2010 after the Munjal family realignment of group businesses. Prior to this, he headed Hero Motors Ltd. which he established in 1988 and was the leader in the automotive moped segment with its brand Hero Puch.

He has been the chairman of the board at Hero Motors Limited since July 2015.
